= Legal affairs of the first Trump presidency =

The following is a list of notable lawsuits involving United States president Donald Trump during his first presidency. The list excludes cases that only name Trump as a legal formality in his capacity as president, such as habeas corpus requests.

On August 1, 2023, Trump was indicted by a federal grand jury on four criminal conspiracy and obstruction charges related to attempts to overturn the 2020 election.

On August 14, 2023, he was indicted by a state grand jury in Georgia on 13 criminal charges also related to attempts to obstruct the 2020 election.

== Trump as plaintiff ==
=== Lawsuits concerning Trump's financial and tax information ===
- Trump et al. v. Mazars et al. – The U.S. House of Representatives had subpoenaed the Mazars accounting firm to provide Trump's tax returns. Trump appealed to keep his financial information private. In July 2020, the U.S. Supreme Court decided 7–2 to send the case back to evaluate the worthiness of the subpoena request. The case was not resolved before the 2020 elections. The Congressional subpoenas related to these cases expired with the end of the 116th Congress on January 3, 2021 and were reissued in the 117th Congress on February 23, 2021.
- Trump et al. v. Deutsche Bank et al. – Appeal lawsuit against the Deutsche Bank and Capital One Bank, seeking to prevent them from complying with the subpoenas issued to the company for Trump's, his adult children's, and his businesses' financial records. The subpoenas had been issued by the House Financial Services and Intelligence committees. The Supreme Court consolidated the case with Trump v. Mazars.
- Trump v. Vance – In July 2020, the U.S. Supreme Court ruled 7–2 that the State of New York could issue a grand-jury subpoena of the President's financial records. The request was determined not to violate Article II or the Supremacy Clause of the United States Constitution. After the court's ruling, Trump's team filed two legal complaints, both of which were rejected.
- Donald J. Trump v. Committee on Ways and Means, et al. – Case in D.C. court challenging the New York TRUST Act, which gives Congress the right to obtain tax information on New York residents. Case dismissed on November 11, 2019.
- Donald J. Trump v. Mary L. Trump, et al. – On September 22, 2021, Trump commenced a lawsuit in New York state court against The New York Times, several journalists and his niece, Mary L. Trump, for a 2018 article detailing his taxes and finances, which he claimed violated a 2001 settlement agreement signed by Mary. Trump sought at least $100 million in damages. In May 2023, the lawsuit was dismissed. In January 2024, the court ordered Trump to pay the newspaper and three of its reporters over $392,000 for legal fees.
- Donald J. Trump and Trump Organization, LLC v. Letitia James in her official capacity as Attorney General for the State of New York – On December 20, 2021, this complaint for declaratory and injunctive relief was filed in federal court against New York Attorney General Letitia James. It accused James of misconduct, by claiming that her involvement in the investigations into Trump and his corporation was motivated by a desire to target a political adversary and advance her career. The federal court dismissed Trump's lawsuit on 27 May 2022. Trump immediately appealed on 31 May 2022, then dropped his appeal on 20 January 2023.

=== Lawsuits concerning the United States Census ===
- Trump v. New York – On September 22, 2020, Trump sought an emergency action from the Supreme Court to rule on the matter before the results of the Census were due by December 31, 2020. On December 18, 2020, the Supreme Court dismissed the case.
- Trump v. Useche – On November 13, 2020, Trump sought an emergency action from the Supreme Court to rule on the matter before the results of the Census were due by December 31, 2020. On December 28, 2020, the Supreme Court ruled the case should be dismissed for lack of jurisdiction.

=== Lawsuits filed by the Trump campaign ===
- Donald J. Trump for President, Inc. v. Northland Television, LLC – Lawsuit brought by the Trump campaign against a Wisconsin TV station for airing an advertisement criticizing the U.S. federal government response to the COVID-19 pandemic. Dismissed in federal court after the election for lack of standing.
- Donald J. Trump for President, Inc. v. WP Company LLC d/b/a Washington Post – Dismissed in February 2023.
- Donald J. Trump for President, Inc. v. CNN – Case dismissed in November 2020.
- Donald J. Trump for President, Inc. v. New York Times – The suit alleged that an op-ed piece in the Times titled The Real Trump-Russia Quid Pro Quo was defamatory. The case was dismissed in March 2021.
- Donald J. Trump for President, Inc. v. Bucks County Bd. of Elections – Pennsylvania Supreme Court ruled in favor of Defendants.
- Donald J. Trump for President, Inc. v. Toulouse Oliver – Dismissed on February 2, 2021, in the United States District Court for the District of New Mexico.
- Donald J. Trump for President, Inc. v. Bullock – The United States District Court for the District of Montana ruled against the Trump campaign, reasoning that the threat of "widespread voter fraud... is a fiction."

=== Trump's racketeering lawsuit against Hillary Clinton, the DNC, and others ===
On March 24, 2022, Trump sued Hillary Clinton, the Democratic National Committee (DNC) and 26 others, alleging that they "maliciously conspired to weave a false narrative that their Republican opponent, Donald J Trump, was colluding with a hostile foreign sovereignty [Russia]" during the 2016 presidential election, and that Trump had lost at least $24 million as a result. In the RICO lawsuit, he asked for a jury trial and $72 million in damages.

In September, U.S. District Judge Donald M. Middlebrooks dismissed the suit, stating that it "ignored existing laws, U.S. Supreme Court precedent, and basic legal theory". The judge also wrote in a footnote that Trump had the lawsuit filed in the federal courthouse in Fort Pierce, Florida, which has only one federal judge, district judge Aileen Cannon, a Trump appointee. Trump appealed the decision on October 11.

On November 2, Clinton and the other defendants filed a motion in the district court asking for sanctions against Trump's attorneys and to make Trump pay their legal bills of more than $1 million. On January 19, 2023, judge Middlebrooks sanctioned Trump and his attorney, Alina Habba, $938,000 to cover the legal costs for the 31 defendants Trump cited in the suit. Middlebrooks wrote, in part:

Here, we are confronted with a lawsuit that should never have been filed, which was completely frivolous, both factually and legally, and which was brought in bad faith for an improper purpose. Mr. Trump is a prolific and sophisticated litigant who is repeatedly using the courts to seek revenge on political adversaries. He is the mastermind of strategic abuse of the judicial process, and he cannot be seen as a litigant blindly following the advice of a lawyer.

On February 3, 2023, Trump offered to post a $1.03 million bond to appeal the judgment. On February 27, 2024, Trump filed an appeal with the 11th U.S. Circuit Court of Appeals, asking to remove the sanctions and reinstate the original lawsuit. On November 26, 2025, the 11th Circuit denied the appeal.

=== Lawsuits regarding the January 6, 2021, attack ===
- Trump v. Thompson, the United States House Select Committee to Investigate the January 6 Attack on the United States Capitol et al. – On October 18, 2021, Trump sued to block the release of White House records related to the January 6, 2021, riot. The lawsuit claimed that the House committee was illegitimate and that its request for the records was a partisan sham. On January 19, 2022, the Supreme Court denied Trump's request without providing a reason. The next day, the National Archives and Records Administration released the White House documents to the committee.
- Trump v. the United States House Select Committee to Investigate the January 6 Attack on the United States Capitol et al. – On November 11, 2022, Trump sued the January 6 Committee to block a subpoena to testify before the committee. Trump did not testify, and the committee dissolved when the new Congress convened on January 3, 2023.

=== Lawsuits for breach of contract ===
- On April 12, 2023, Trump sued his former attorney, Michael Cohen, for breach of contract. Trump sought $500 million in damages. On July 31, 2023, Cohen's attorneys called Trump to sit for a deposition on September 6. At a hearing on September 5, the deposition was moved to October 3. On October 5, after the deposition was delayed, a Trump attorney filed to dismiss the lawsuit without prejudice (meaning it could later be resumed).

=== Defamation lawsuits ===
- On October 3, 2022, Trump sued CNN in the Southern District of Florida, alleging that "CNN has sought to use its massive influence—purportedly as a 'trusted' news source—to defame the Plaintiff in the minds of its viewers and readers for the purpose of defeating him politically." Trump's lawyers alleged CNN personalities used the term Big Lie to associate him with Adolf Hitler and sought $475 million in punitive damages. On June 16, 2023, attorney Jim Trusty, who formerly represented Trump in the federal prosecution against him for allegedly mishandling confidential documents, also requested permission to withdraw from the CNN case, citing "irreconcilable differences" with his client. Florida federal judge Raag Singhal dismissed the lawsuit in July 2023. On November 18, 2025, a Federal appeals court denied Trump’s appeal, calling his arguments “meritless.”

== Trump as defendant ==
=== Lawsuits concerning the United States Constitution ===
- Lawsuits alleging violations of the First Amendment to the U.S. Constitution
  - Knight First Amendment Institute v. Trump
  - CNN v. Trump
  - U.S. WeChat Users Alliance v. Trump
- Lawsuits alleging violations of the Fifth Amendment to the U.S. Constitution
  - Department of Homeland Security v. Regents of the University of California (the DACA lawsuit)
  - New York v. Trump (another DACA lawsuit)
  - Vidal v. Nielsen (another DACA lawsuit)
- Lawsuit alleging violations of the Fourteenth Amendment to the U.S. Constitution
  - Stone v. Trump
- Lawsuits alleging violations of the Foreign Emoluments Clause of the United States Constitution
  - CREW v. Trump
  - D.C. and Maryland v. Trump
  - Blumenthal v. Trump
- U.S. Constitutional case law lawsuit filed by the United States House Committee on the Judiciary to compel the testimony of former White House Counsel Donald F. McGahn Jr. under subpoena.
  - In re: Don McGahn

=== Lawsuits concerning executive orders and presidential proclamations and memorandums ===
- Legal challenges to Executive Order 13768, regarding sanctuary cities
  - City and County of San Francisco v. Trump
  - City of Chelsea v. Trump
- Legal challenges to Executive Order 13769, regarding temporary immigration restrictions
  - Aziz v. Trump
  - Darweesh v. Trump
  - Doe v. Trump
  - Louhghalam v. Trump
  - Mohammed v. United States
  - Sarsour v. Trump
  - Washington v. Trump
- Legal challenges to Executive Order 13780, a revised order on temporary immigration restrictions
  - Hawaii v. Trump
  - International Refugee Assistance Project v. Trump
  - Washington v. Trump
- Legal challenges to Temporary Protected Status changes
  - Bhattarai v. Nielsen
  - Ramos v. Nielsen
- Legal challenge to Presidential Proclamation "Addressing Mass Migration Through the Southern Border of the United States" ("Proclamation") 83 Fed. Reg. 57,661, which expressly invokes 8 U.S.C. § 1182
  - East Bay Sanctuary Covenant v. Trump
- Lawsuits concerning TikTok
  - TikTok v. Trump
- Lawsuits regarding Presidential Memorandum on Military Service by Transgender Individuals by Donald Trump (August 25, 2017)
  - Jane Doe v. Trump
  - Stone v. Trump
  - Karnoski v. Trump
  - Stockman v. Trump
- Lawsuit challenging Executive Order 14160, regarding birthright citizenship and the 14th Amendment (2025)
  - State of Washington v. Trump (2025)

=== Lawsuits concerning legal violations ===
- Lawsuit alleging violations of compliance with a grand jury empaneled by Robert Mueller in the Special counsel investigation
  - In re Grand Jury Subpoena
- Lawsuit alleging violations of the Presidential Records Act of 1978, 44 U.S.C. §§ 2201–2207
  - CREW and National Security Archive v. Trump and EOP
- Lawsuits challenging Presidential Advisory Commission on Election Integrity alleging violations of the Federal Advisory Committee Act
  - ACLU v. Trump and Pence
  - Joyner v. Presidential Advisory Commission on Election Integrity
  - NAACP v. Trump
- Lawsuit alleging violation of 12 U.S.C. § 5491(b)(5)(B), a component of the Dodd–Frank Act of 2010
  - English v. Trump
- Lawsuit requesting grand jury materials from the Special counsel investigation by Robert Mueller
  - In re Application of the Committee on the Judiciary
- New York state lawsuit against the Trump administration for its policy to exclude New Yorkers from enrolling in federal Trusted Traveler programs.
- Lawsuit alleging Freedom of Information Act violations regarding redaction of The Room Where It Happened by John Bolton
  - Legal Eagle, LLC v. National Security Council Records Access and Information Security Management Directorate
- Lawsuit alleging "retaliatory imprisonment" in reaction to Disloyal by Michael Cohen
  - Cohen v U.S., 21-cv-10774, U.S. District Court, Southern District of New York (Manhattan)
- Lawsuit concerning the FBI investigation into Donald Trump's handling of government documents
  - Donald J. Trump v. United States of America (2022, dismissed)

=== Lawsuits concerning the United States Census ===
- Regarding the 2020 United States Census
  - Department of Commerce v. New York
  - New York Immigration Coalition v. United States Department of Commerce

=== Lawsuits concerning Trump political campaigns ===
- Lawsuit alleging that the Trump Campaign used mass, unsolicited communication of promotional messages that the plaintiffs did not consent to receive
  - Thorne v. Donald J Trump for President Inc.
- Lawsuit alleging Russian interference in the 2016 Federal Elections, the Trump campaign was accused of engaging in a racketeering enterprise in conjunction with Russia and WikiLeaks
  - Democratic National Committee v. Russian Federation (dismissed)
- Lawsuit regarding a pattern of persistent illegal conduct, occurring over more than a decade, that includes extensive unlawful political coordination with the Trump presidential campaign, repeated and willful self-dealing transactions to benefit Mr. Trump's personal and business interests, and violations of basic legal obligations for non-profit foundations
  - State of New York v. The Trump Foundation
- Lawsuit in which plaintiffs alleged Trump's security team assaulted them during a 2015 peaceful protest based on Trump's campaign comments about Black Lives Matter and Mexican immigrants
  - Galicia v. Trump
- Lawsuit alleging Trump encouraged an atmosphere of violence and anti-Trump protesters were subjected to attacks and racial slurs being led out of a campaign rally in 2016. The case was dismissed in 2018.
  - Nwanguma v. Trump
- Lawsuit alleging that Trump and the Republican National Committee colluded to prevent any competition to Trump's re-election campaign.
  - Roque De La Fuente v. Trump & Republican National Committee
- Roger Stone (Roger J. Stone Jr.) found guilty by a jury in November 2019 of on obstruction of a congressional investigation, five counts of making false statements to Congress, and tampering with a witness in the United States District Court for the District of Columbia. He was later sentenced to 40 months in prison, but his sentence was commuted by Trump.
- Lawsuit alleging that Trump infringed copyright by tweeting a campaign video that included musician Eddy Grant's song “Electric Avenue." The parties settled the case after a judge determined that a copyright violation did occur.

=== Lawsuits concerning sexual misconduct and assault ===
- Lawsuit by Katie Johnson which alleges that Trump and Jeffrey Epstein sexually and physically abused her under threats to physically harm her and her family while a 13-year-old minor from June–September 1994
  - Katie Johnson v. Donald J Trump and Jeffrey Epstein (dismissed)
- Lawsuit by Jane Doe which alleges Trump and Epstein engaged in forcible rape, imprisonment and assault while she was a 13-year-old minor and another 12-year-old girl in 1994
  - Jane Doe v. Donald Trump & Jeffrey E Epstein (dismissed by Doe)
- Lawsuit by former campaign staffer, Alva Johnson, who claims that Trump forcibly kissed her at a rally in Florida in August 2016. The lawsuit also alleges unequal pay standards for her, an African-American woman, compared to others on the team
  - Johnson v. Trump (dropped)
- Defamation lawsuit raised by Summer Zervos which arose from Trump's statement that she lied about sexual assault allegations against him
  - Zervos v. Trump (dropped)
- Defamation and battery litigation on behalf of E. Jean Carroll, who alleges that Trump sexually assaulted her and committed rape, sexual abuse, and forcible touching in the mid-1990s and that his denials of her accusation harmed her professionally
  - Carroll v. Trump

=== Lawsuits concerning financial manipulation and employee payment ===
- Lawsuit alleging violations of employee payment regarding not paying him for "thousands of hours of overtime" to which he was legally entitled during his more than two decades of service (moved to arbitration)
  - Cintron v. Trump Organization
- Lawsuit alleging that Trump and his adult children had made a large amount of money by encouraging unsophisticated investors to join fraudulent schemes
  - Doe et al. v. Trump Corp. et al.
- Lawsuit by the New York AG alleging that Trump, the Trump Organization and his three adult children engaged in numerous acts of fraud and misrepresentations to inflate his net worth to lenders
  - People of the State of New York, by Letitia James v. Donald J Trump et al

=== Lawsuits concerning environmental concerns ===
- Lawsuit brought by Our Children's Trust using the public trust doctrine to address the effects of global warming. Settlement is being discussed.
  - Juliana v. United States
- League of Conservation Voters lawsuit challenging Trump's attempt to undo a ban on oil and gas drilling in certain areas of the Atlantic and Arctic Oceans. District court ruled that Trump overstepped his constitutional authority and violated federal law. Ninth Circuit ruled President Biden's revocation of President Trump's executive order rendered the case moot.
  - League of Conservation Voters v. Trump

=== Lawsuits concerning COVID-19 ===
- Lawsuit brought against Trump's alleged denial of stimulus checks to spouses of undocumented immigrants
  - John Doe v. Trump

=== Lawsuits concerning 2020 election fraud claims ===
Trump and his team filed dozens of lawsuits regarding the procedures in the 2020 presidential election and Joe Biden's victory. Georgia Cobb County and DeKalb County filed lawsuits to recover costs associated with what DeKalb County called "unsubstantiated and frivolous claims."

In November 2020, the Michigan Welfare Rights Organization along with three black voters filed a lawsuit against Donald Trump and his presidential campaign for allegedly disenfranchising black voters in Michigan. The following month, the NAACP filed an amendment complaint, this time adding the Republican National Committee as a defendant, in which the civil rights organization accused Trump, his presidential campaign and the RNC of coordinated conspiracy to disenfranchise hundreds of thousands of voters in targeted cities with large black populations, such as Atlanta, Milwaukee and Philadelphia. On October 5, 2023, the trial was reassigned to Judge Tanya S. Chutkan, the judge who is also overseeing Donald Trump's federal election obstruction prosecution.

In February 2021, U.S. Representative Bennie Thompson filed a lawsuit against Donald Trump, Rudy Giuliani, the Proud Boys and the Oath Keepers for conspiring to attack the Capitol. In February 2022, a federal judge ruled that the lawsuit could proceed.

In March 2021, U.S. Representative Eric Swalwell filed a lawsuit against Donald Trump, Donald Trump Jr., Rudy Giuliani and U.S. Representative Mo Brooks (R-AL) for their actions on the day the U.S. Capitol was stormed. In February 2022, a federal judge ruled that the lawsuit could proceed.

In March 2021, two Capitol Police officers filed a lawsuit against Donald Trump. In February 2022, a federal judge ruled that the lawsuit could proceed.

In January 2022, two Metropolitan and one Capitol Police officer filed separate suits against Trump, highlighting alleged wrongful conduct by Trump in inciting a riot during the January 6 riot.

In November 2021, James Savage, a voting machine warehouse custodian in Delaware County, filed a 60-page defamation lawsuit against Donald Trump, Rudy Giuliani, and Jenna Ellis.

Some civil lawsuits have attempted to hold Trump accountable for the attack on the U.S. Capitol. On December 1, 2023, a federal appeals court in Washington, DC ruled that these lawsuits may proceed. Chief Judge Sri Srinivasan wrote the opinion; Greg Katsas concurred; Judge Judith Rogers partly concurred.

The decision specifically referred to three lawsuits by Capitol police officers and members of Congress:

- Blassingame Compl. ¶¶ 150–228, J.A. 55–67
- Swalwell Compl. ¶¶ 224–26, J.A. 127
- Thompson Compl. ¶¶ 151–267, J.A. 178–200

Federal law prohibits conspiracy to prevent someone from holding federal office. The lawsuits are based on this law.

=== Recent civil cases ===
- Doe et al. v. Trump Corp. et al., a lawsuit alleging racketeering by Trump and some of his adult children through various Trump-associated organizations. The trial was scheduled for January 29, 2024, but on January 12, U.S. District Judge Lorna G. Schofield dismissed the case from federal court, recommending plaintiffs file their cases in state courts.
- New York civil investigation of The Trump Organization was a lawsuit brought by the New York AG alleging that Trump, the Trump Organization and his three adult children engaged in numerous acts of fraud and misrepresentations to inflate his net worth to lenders. The judge ruled that Donald Trump and his companies were liable to pay $354.8 million, not including interest that could amount to $100 million. On March 25, 2024, the New York Appeals Court lowered the amount required to be paid in order to be allowed to appeal the full judgement to $175 million, which Trump publicly stated he would pay. Trump would post the $175 million bond on April 1, 2024. On August 21, 2025, the appeals court upheld Trump's liability but voided the penalty as excessive.

== Trump 2020 campaign-related lawsuits by state ==
=== Arizona ===
- Donald J. Trump for President v. Katie Hobbs (dismissed)

=== New Jersey ===
- Donald J. Trump for President v. Way (motion denied by district court)

=== Pennsylvania ===
- Republican Party of Pennsylvania v. Boockvar, 20-542; Scarnati v. Pennsylvania Democratic Party, 20-574
- Donald J. Trump for President, Inc. v. Kathy Boockvar and County Boards of Elections, 602 MD 2020
- Philadelphia County Canvassing Observation Appeal, 1094 CD 20
- Donald J. Trump for President, Inc. v. Philadelphia County Board of Elections, 20-5533
- Hamm, Kelly, Allred, Horner, Connor and Hauser v. Boockvar, 600 MD 2020
- Donald J. Trump for President, Inc., et al. v. Kathy Boockvar, et al., 4:20-cv-02078

=== Michigan ===
- Donald J. Trump and Eric Ostergren v. Jocelyn Benson, 20-000225-MZ

=== Georgia ===
- In Re: Enforcement of Election Laws and Securing Ballots Cast or Received after 7:00pm on November 3, 2020, SPCV20-00982
- Trump v. Kemp, 20-DV-05310

=== Wisconsin ===
- Pierson v. Stepien, 20-CV-9266

== See also ==
- Business projects of Donald Trump in Russia
- Links between Trump associates and Russian officials
- Republican reactions to Donald Trump's claims of 2020 election fraud
- Timeline of investigations into Donald Trump and Russia (2019)
- Timeline of investigations into Donald Trump and Russia (2020–2021)
- Federal prosecution of Donald Trump
- Legal affairs of the second Donald Trump presidency
