= Legal challenges to the Trump travel ban =

Legal disputes

Executive Order 13769
- Protecting the Nation from Foreign Terrorist Entry into the United States
- Executive Order 13769 in the Federal Register
- Type: Executive order
- President: Donald Trump
- Signed: January 27, 2017

Federal Register details
- Federal Register document number: 2017-02281
- Publication date: 1 February 2017
- Document citation: 82 FR 8977

Executive Order 13769 was signed by U.S. president Donald Trump on January 27, 2017, and quickly became the subject of legal challenges in the federal courts of the United States. The order sought to restrict travel from seven Muslim majority countries: Iran, Iraq, Libya, Somalia, Sudan, Syria, and Yemen. The plaintiffs challenging the order argued that it contravened the United States Constitution, federal statutes, or both. On March 16, 2017, Executive Order 13769 was superseded by Executive Order 13780, which took legal objections into account and removed Iraq from affected countries. Then on September 24, 2017, Executive Order 13780 was superseded by Presidential Proclamation 9645 which is aimed at more permanently establishing travel restrictions on those countries except Sudan, while adding North Korea and Venezuela which had not previously been included.

Legal challenges to these orders were brought almost immediately after their issuance. From January 28 to 31 almost 50 cases were filed in federal courts. The courts granted temporary relief including multiple temporary restraining orders (TRO) that barred the enforcement of major parts of the executive order. The chief TRO was issued by a federal court in the State of Washington and was explicitly nationwide in scope. That TRO specifically blocked the executive branch from enforcing provisions of the executive order that (1) suspend entry into the U.S. for people from seven countries for 90 days and (2) place limitations on the acceptance of refugees including "any action that prioritizes the refugee claims of certain religious minorities." The TRO also allowed "people from the seven countries who had been authorized to travel, along with vetted refugees from all nations, to enter the country." The Trump administration appealed the TRO to the U.S. Court of Appeals for the Ninth Circuit, which ruled against the government and allowed the stay to stand.

The second Executive Order,13780, removed Iraq from the list of targeted countries and allowed more exemptions. Portions of that order were blocked by a Hawaii federal judge on March 15. On June 26, the Supreme Court partially stayed some of the injunctions that had been put on the order by federal appeals courts earlier, allowing the executive order to mostly go into effect. Oral argument concerning the legality of the order was to be held in October 2017.

The parties challenging the executive orders included both private individuals (some of whom were blocked from entering the U.S. or detained following the executive order's issuance) and the states of Washington and Minnesota represented by their state attorneys general. Other organizations, such as the American Civil Liberties Union (ACLU), also challenged the order in court. Fifteen Democratic state attorneys general released a joint statement calling the executive order "unconstitutional, un-American and unlawful" and seventeen states filed an amicus brief in support of the challenge to the order.

In response to the issuance of Presidential Proclamation 9645, the Supreme Court canceled its scheduled October hearing on the executive order that the proclamation replaced, declining to rule on its merits as it was about to expire. On October 17, a U.S. district judge in Hawaii issued an opinion saying that much of the proclamation is unconstitutional. On June 26, 2018, the Supreme Court overturned the lower court opinion and upheld Proclamation 9645 in a 5–4 decision.

== Background ==
President Donald Trump signed Executive Order 13769 on January 27, 2017. The order limited the number of refugee arrivals to the U.S. to 50,000 for 2017 and suspended the U.S. Refugee Admissions Program (USRAP) for 120 days, after which the program would be conditionally resumed for individual countries while prioritizing refugee claims from persecuted minority religions. The order also indefinitely suspended the entry of Syrian refugees. Further, the order suspended the entry of alien nationals from seven Muslim-majority countries – Iraq, Iran, Libya, Somalia, Sudan, Syria and Yemen – for 90 days, after which an updated list will be made. The order allows exceptions to these suspensions on a case-by-case basis. The U.S. Department of Homeland Security later exempted U.S. lawful permanent residents (green card holders).

Section 3 of the order applies to over 218 million people, the total combined population of the seven countries named in the executive order. Fewer than 60,000 visas have been revoked under the travel ban. Section 5 applies to all countries. Over a hundred travelers were detained and held for hours without access to family or legal assistance. In addition, up to 60,000 visas were "provisionally revoked", according to the State Department.

=== State Department action ===
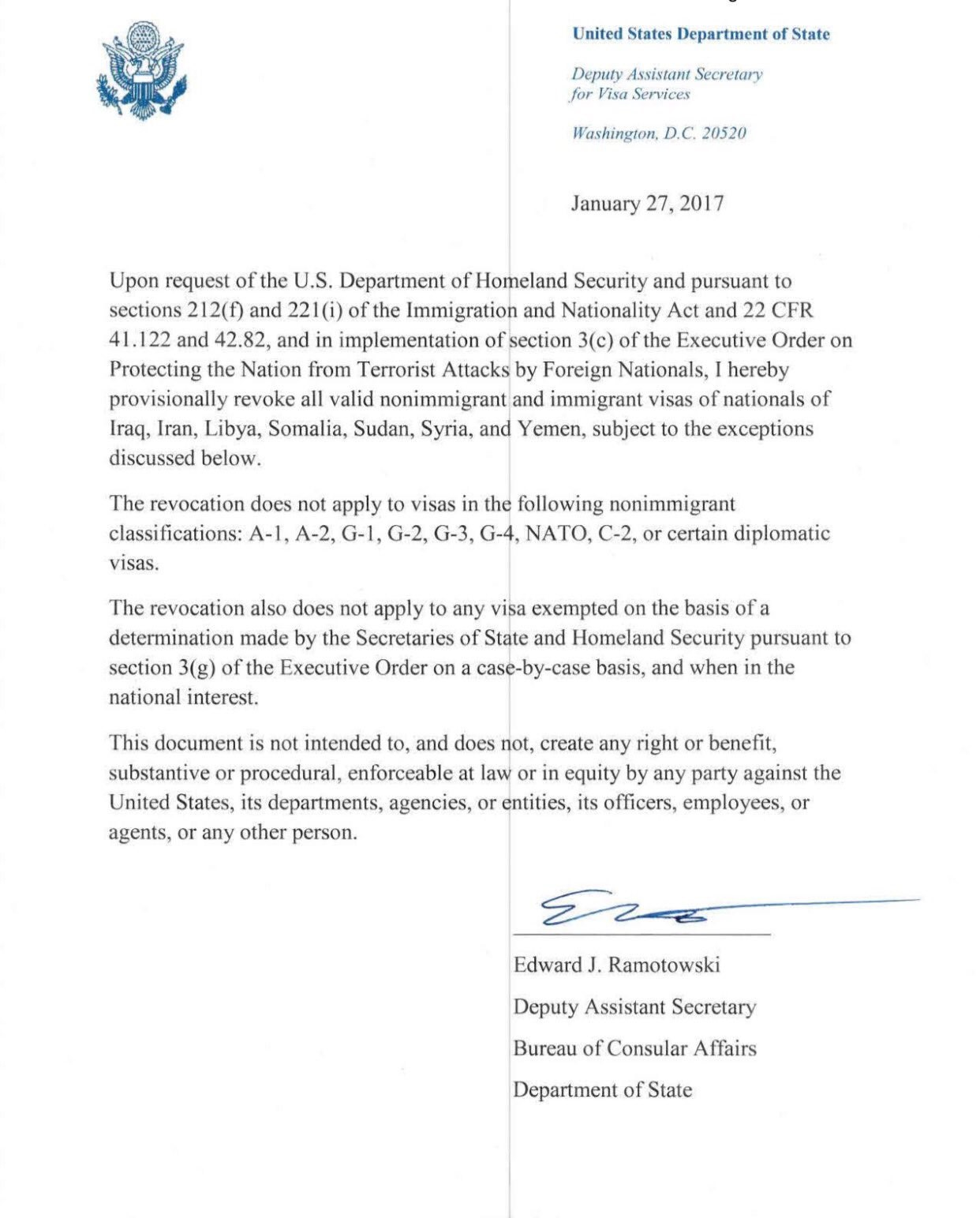
State Department provisional revocation of some visas

On January 27, 2017, Edward J. Ramotowski, deputy assistant secretary of state for visa services, signed a one-page directive "provisionally revoking" all visas, except diplomatic visas, issued to nationals of the seven countries listed in the order, subject to "case-by-case exceptions" that may be made. However, the State Department did not release this directive to the public, and it was unclear whether affected visa holders had been notified that their visas had been revoked. The directive did not come to public attention until late on January 31 (through a filing in the Boston legal action). The ACLU of Massachusetts, in a statement through its executive director, called the memorandum "deeply suspicious" and stated: "We find it deeply troubling that – just a few days from the first hearing in the nation on the executive order – the government is claiming to have revoked the visas of thousands of people without whispering a word about it to them, to the courts evaluating the executive order, or to anyone else." Noah Feldman noted that one effect of the State Department revocation could have been that "the Boston court order was in effect nullified even before it was issued" (since "[i]t was lawful to enter the U.S. in Boston if you had a valid visa, but you couldn't have a valid visa because the memo revoked the visas"), but a federal judge in Los Angeles issued an order prohibiting cancellation of valid visas, appearing to negate the State Department order.

=== Acting Attorney General statement and firing ===
After the executive order was signed, the acting attorney general of the United States, Sally Yates, directed the U.S. Department of Justice not to present arguments in court in defense of the executive order, writing in a memorandum that she was not convinced that the order was lawful. Trump responded by firing Yates and publicly denouncing her in a "scorched-earth" statement. Later that day, the Trump administration replaced her with Dana Boente, the United States Attorney for the Eastern District of Virginia.

== Legal bases of the challenges ==
DHS Intelligence document showing no real threat exists from countries banned.

A variety of legal arguments—both constitutional and statutory—have been raised by the challengers to the executive order, including the states of Washington and Minnesota, the American Civil Liberties Union, and the Council on American-Islamic Relations.

=== Statutory challenges ===
Statutory challenges are based on the Immigration and Nationality Act (INA) and the Administrative Procedure Act (APA). The INA deals with U.S. immigration law, while the APA governs administrative processes and provides, among other things, that actions performed by government agencies cannot be arbitrary, capricious, or unsupported by evidence.

Trump, in his executive order, relied on a provision established in 1952 under Section 212(f) of the INA, which states that, "Whenever the President finds that the entry of any aliens or of any class of aliens into the United States would be detrimental to the interests of the United States, he may by proclamation, and for such period as he shall deem necessary, suspend the entry of all aliens or any class of aliens as immigrants or nonimmigrants, or impose on the entry of aliens any restrictions he may deem to be appropriate." This provision gives broad powers to the President in regards to the entry of aliens. But a different provision enacted under an amendment in 1965 establishes that, "no person shall receive any preference or priority or be discriminated against in the issuance of an immigrant visa because of the person's race, sex, nationality, place of birth, or place of residence" This non-discrimination clause is one basis for the legal challenges under the argument that while the President was given broad powers in 1952, such powers were eventually limited in 1965.

Several experts provided their legal opinions on the INA challenges. David Bier, an immigration policy analyst at the Cato Institute, wrote that depending on its application, "Trump's new policy would run afoul of at least one if not all three of (the) restrictions -- nationality, place of birth, or place of residence." According to The New York Times, the tension between 1952 law and the 1965 law "has not been definitively resolved by the courts." Two legal scholars, Jennifer Chacon from the University of California, Irvine and Steven J. Mulroy from the University of Memphis, believe that a challenge based on the INA's 1965 non-discrimination provision is the strongest legal argument against the executive order. On the other hand, immigration attorney Nolan Rapaport believes that the order is "perfectly legal." Similarly, Andrew C. McCarthy, a senior policy fellow at the National Review Institute, argues in favor of the legality of excluding nationals from specific countries. His first argument is that "the transaction of business with foreign nations is Executive altogether" when considering the 1936 Supreme Court ruling of "the very delicate, plenary and exclusive power of the President as the sole organ of the federal government in the field of international relations – a power which does not require as a basis for its exercise an act of Congress." Second, he argues "because of the national-security distinction between Trump's 2017 order and Congress's 1965 objective, it is not necessary to construe them as contradictory", which is because "Section 1182(f) plainly and sweepingly authorizes the president to issue temporary bans on the entry of classes of aliens for national-security purposes." Third, he argues that in the case of the 1965 anti-discrimination provision applying, by Trump relying on an Obama-era provision where "Congress expressly authorized discrimination on the basis of national origin when concerns over international terrorism are involved...the 1965 statute must be deemed amended by the much more recent statute."

Another statute raised by challengers invokes the Administrative Procedure Act (APA). This act established that an agency action will be set aside if "arbitrary, capricious, an abuse of discretion or otherwise not in accordance with law." A number of executive actions by past presidents of both parties have been invalidated on the basis of the APA. These challenges were included in the Sarsour v. Trump case brought by the Council on American-Islamic Relations.

=== Constitutional challenges ===
Challengers to Executive Order 13769 also argue that it violates the United States Constitution. Their basis is founded on the constitutional right to procedural due process—the principle that the government may not deprive individuals of a liberty interest without some sort of fair procedure, such as the opportunity for a hearing before a neutral decision maker. Challengers also argue that the order violates the Equal Protection Clause by irrationally discriminating on the basis of national origin. In that respect, legal scholar Ruthann Robson noted that the courts have been critical of "governmental distinctions based on ancestry and race." Furthermore, the Supreme Court has held that immigrants—including non-citizens and permanent residents—have rights to due process and equal protection, but only if they are physically present in the United States. This is one reason why several court orders gave relief only to individuals in the U.S. at the time of the court ruling.

Another avenue of constitutional challenge is the Establishment Clause of the First Amendment. This clause bars the government from acting to "disfavor a particular religion." David D. Cole, a professor at the Georgetown University Law Center that serves as national legal director for the ACLU, stated that, "The executive order, of course, does not say in express terms that it is favoring Christians and disfavoring Muslims. But Trump is the signatory, and he has said so explicitly." According to Steven Mulroy, a law professor in constitutional law at the University of Memphis Cecil C. Humphreys School of Law, an Establishment Clause theory "may be the most important of the constitutional theories involved in this case because it may have the broadest scope," applying even to persons not already in the United States and prospectively providing an avenue for a court to invalidate the entirety of the executive order.

== Overview of cases ==
Case	District	Status
State of Washington v. Trump	Western District of Washington	Nationwide temporary restraining order (TRO) entered by district court. An appeal of the TRO to the Court of Appeals for the Ninth Circuit was denied.
Aziz v. Trump	Eastern District of Virginia	A temporary restraining order was issued (and extended to February 10). The Commonwealth of Virginia's motion to intervene on the side of the challengers was granted. The federal government was ordered to provide Virginia a list of Virginia residents who (1) were denied entry or were deported since the executive order was signed and (2) were lawful permanent residents or held a valid immigrant or non-immigrant visa by February 9.
Darweesh v. Trump	Eastern District of New York	A stay order, enjoining (prohibiting) enforcement of the executive order is in effect and set to expire on February 21, 2017.
Louhghalam v. Trump	District of Massachusetts	Judge Gorton issued a memorandum rejecting a request for preliminary injunction.
Mohammed v. United States	Central District of California	A temporary restraining order enjoining the Executive Order was entered January 31, 2017. The Court subsequently set the matter for Preliminary Injunction hearing on February 10, 2017.
Sarsour v. Trump	Eastern District of Virginia	Complaint filed seeking an injunction, case is currently pending.

== State of Washington v. Trump ==
Abandonment of Case by Trump Justice Department

State of Washington and State of Minnesota v. Trump was a suit in the United States District Court for the Western District of Washington challenging the validity of the order. On January 30, 2017, the State of Washington filed the civil action against Trump and the U.S. Department of Homeland Security, asking the court for declaratory relief (a declaration that the executive order violates the Constitution) and injunctive relief (to block enforcement of the executive order). The state also filed a motion for a temporary restraining order, seeking an immediate halt to the executive order's implementation. On February 1, Minnesota was added as a plaintiff alongside Washington. On February 3, Judge James L. Robart issued a nationwide temporary restraining order against certain provisions of the order. The ruling enjoins the government not to enforce sections 3(c), 5(a), and 5(c) of the order, and bars the government from "prioritizing the refugee claims of religious minorities" as described in sections 5(b) and 5(e).

The Department of Justice filed an appeal to the order with the United States Court of Appeals for the Ninth Circuit. On February 9, a three judge panel of the 9th Circuit Court of Appeals denied the federal government's request for a stay upholding the temporary restraining order prohibiting enforcement. The court's decision was based on several factors. One was that the state of Washington did have standing in the case and therefore, the right to sue. The court also denied that the judiciary should not review the executive order, rejecting the idea that the President of the U.S. has unfettered power. They also stated that there was no immediate need for the ban. The court was also skeptical of both the Trump administration's intent for the ban and questioned the due process of the executive order. Trump responded to the court ruling by tweeting in all caps on February 9, "SEE YOU IN COURT, THE SECURITY OF OUR NATION IS AT STAKE!"

On February 16, the Trump administration asked for a delay in further proceedings because they expected to replace the executive order with a new one the following week. On February 16, 2017, the 9th Circuit issued an order staying the en-banc review of its previous ruling based on the United States Supplemental Brief promising a new executive order.

On March 8, 2017, the United States moved to dismiss the appeal of the injunction related to executive order 13769, and the 9th Circuit Court subsequently dismissed appeal of Case 17–35105.

On March 13, 2017, the Washington State Attorney General filed a second amended complaint addressing executive order 13780 and moved the court to enjoin enforcement of the order under the current preliminary injunction previously issued which barred enforcement of executive order 13769 by filing a motion for emergency enforcement of the preliminary injunction. The State of Washington in their second amended complaint asked the Court to Declare that Sections 3(c), 5(a)–(c), and 5(e) of the First Executive Order 13769 are unauthorized by and contrary to the Constitution and laws of the United States, and that the United States should be enjoined from implementing or enforcing Sections 3(c), 5(a)–(c), and 5(e) of the First Executive Order, including at all United States borders, ports of entry, and in the issuance of visas, pending further orders from this Court. The State of Washington also asked the Court to declare that Sections 2(c) and 6(a) of the Second Executive Order 13780 are unauthorized by and contrary to the Constitution and laws of the United States, and that the United States should also be enjoined from implementing or enforcing Sections 2(c) and 6(a) of the Second Executive Order 13780, including at all United States borders, ports of entry, and in the issuance of visas, and enjoin the United States from implementing or enforcing Section 5(d) of the First Executive Order 13769 and enjoin the United States from implementing or enforcing Section 6(b) of the Second Executive Order 13780. The Court subsequently issued an order directing the United States to file a response to the emergency motion to enforce the preliminary injunction by March 14, 2017.

=== The U.S. Supreme Court ===
In a per curiam decision, on June 26, 2017, the United States Supreme Court reinstated key provisions narrowed to apply only to foreign nationals who have no "credible claim of a bona fide relationship with a person or entity in the United States" and set case for final consideration in October. The court also granted certiorari and set oral arguments for the Fall term. In an unsigned statement the Supreme Court stated that denying entry to foreign nationals abroad who have no connection to the United States "does not burden any American party by reason of that party's relationship with the foreign national."

Justices Thomas, Gorsuch, and Alito wrote that the preliminary injunction to the executive order by lower courts was incorrect in its entirety.

== Arab American Civil Rights League (ACRL) v. Trump ==
Arab American Civil Rights League (ACRL) v. Trump
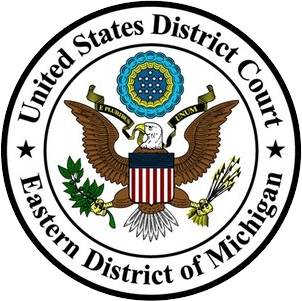
- Court: United States District Court for the Eastern District of Michigan
- Full case name: Arab American Civil Rights League (ACRL) v. Trump, the Department of Homeland Security, and U.S. Customs and Border Protection
- Citation: No. 2:17-cv-10310

Arab American Civil Rights League (ACRL) v. Trump, No. 2:17-cv-10310 (E.D. Mich. 2017), is a case currently pending in the United States District Court for the Eastern District of Michigan. It was filed on January 31, 2017, by the Arab American Civil Rights League and seven of its individual members. Judge Victoria A. Roberts is assigned the case. On May 11, 2017, Roberts ordered the Trump administration to turn over a memo by adviser Rudy Giuliani—allegedly written to make the travel order appear that it was not specifically aimed at Muslims—by May 19, 2017.

== Aziz v. Trump ==
Aziz v. Trump
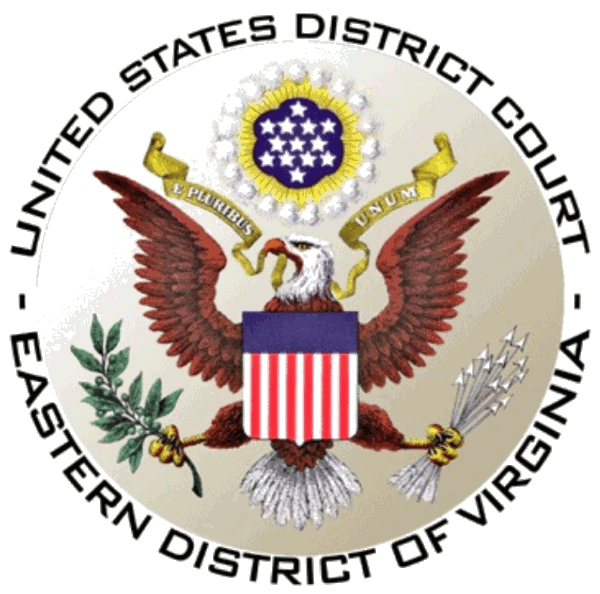
- Court: United States District Court for the Eastern District of Virginia
- Full case name: Tareq Aqel Mohammed Aziz, Ammar Aqel Mohammed Aziz, Aqel Muhammad Aziz, Plaintiffs, v. Donald J. Trump, in his official capacity as President of the United States of America, et al., Defendants
- Citation: No. 1:17-cv-00116

Aziz v. Trump, No. 1:17-cv-00116 (E.D.Va. 2017), was a case in the United States District Court for the Eastern District of Virginia concerning the executive order and the detention of 50–60 individuals at the Washington Dulles International Airport in Virginia from countries listed in the order. On February 13, Judge Leonie Brinkema of the Eastern District of Virginia, presiding in Aziz, et al. v. Trump issued a preliminary injunction because the executive order likely discriminates against Muslims, becoming the first court to explicitly find likelihood of success on the merits to the religious discrimination claim.

=== Background ===
On the day Trump signed the executive order, January 27, 2017, 50–60 individuals at Washington Dulles International Airport in Virginia were detained by U.S. Customs and Border Protection. They were blocked from meeting with their attorneys or from applying for asylum.

On January 28, 2017, Tareq Aqel Mohammed Aziz, Ammar Aqel Mohammed Aziz, Aqel Muhammad Aziz, and John Does 1-60 filed a civil action in the United States District Court for the Eastern District of Virginia, requesting a writ of habeas corpus and declaratory and injunctive relief after being detained at Dulles International Airport by Customs Officers. They alleged six causes of action in their original petition, denial of procedural due process, anti-establishment of religion (claims they are being targeted because they are Muslim), The Immigration and Nationality Act, Equal Protection, Administrative Procedure Act, and Religious Freedom Restoration Act.

=== Temporary restraining order ===
TRO in Aziz v. Trump

On January 28, 2017, U.S. District Judge Leonie Brinkema issued a temporary restraining order enjoining President Donald Trump and the other respondents from enforcing of parts of Trump's executive order. The Court stated in its order that Customs officials "... shall permit lawyers access to all legal permanent residents being detained at Dulles International Airport ..." and that Customs officers "... are forbidden from removing plaintiffs ... lawful permanent residents at Dulles International Airport for a period of 7 days from the issuance of this Order." The court has neither let the affected people into the country nor ruled on the constitutionality of the order itself in its ruling. Subsequently, the restraining order has been extended until February 10, 2017.

=== Non-compliance with court order ===
On January 28, 2017, the United States Customs and Border Protection agency ("CBP") and the Metropolitan Washington Airports Authority ("MWAA") defied a court order issued that evening by the United States District Court for the Eastern District of Virginia requiring that attorneys be granted access to travelers at Dulles Airport detained by CBP agents. By 10:30 pm that night, CBP and MWAA had copies of the order in hand, and repeatedly refused to comply on orders from the CBP. The MWAA Vice President and Airport Manager for Dulles International and the MWAA Deputy Chief of Police both refused to provide the legally required attorney access, despite confirming that they had the codes necessary to open the doors to the location where CBP was detaining individuals based on President Trump's executive order. At approximately midnight, United States Senator Cory Booker, with a copy of the access Order in hand, was rejected access himself and for any of the attorneys present. As of late Sunday morning, a border agent told lawyers that agents have been instructed not to speak with them. Lawyers at Dulles stated they are currently considering motions to hold the government in contempt and to compel disclosure of any individuals who are being detained.

On January 29, 2017, several members of Congress traveled to Dulles Airport and demanded that Dulles MWAA Police officers allow them to at least speak to customs officials - Democratic Reps. Gerry Connolly (Va.), Don Beyer (Va.), Jamie Raskin (Md.), and John Delaney (Md.). Connolly formally requested access to the detainees from MWAA Police, including Chief Deputy Damsky, and CBP and his request was denied. Connolly reportedly demanded, "Your job is to enforce the law, We have a federal judge who has ruled that anybody being detained is entitled to legal representation. Have they been denied that right or are they in fact getting legal representation?" Connolly was handed a phone with the CBP congressional liaison office on the line during his altercation with Airport Police. Connolly later reported that "he tried to get a straight answer from them but got nowhere".

On February 1, 2017, the Commonwealth of Virginia moved to intervene in the lawsuit and filed a motion to show cause as to why the respondents should not be held in contempt of court.

=== Amended complaint and crowdfunding ===
On January 30, 2017, the Legal Aid Justice Center ("LAJC") filed an amended complaint against Donald Trump, the Department of Homeland Security, Customs and Border Protection, John Kelly (Secretary of DHS), Kevin McAleenan (Acting Commissioner of CBP), Wayne Bioni (CBP Port Director of the Area Port of Washington Dulles), and eight unnamed CBP agents at Dulles Airport. The amended complaint further details the circumstances surrounding the Aziz brothers' detainment and treatment and asks for the US Government to allow everyone deported from Dulles as a result of Trump's executive order to return to the US and have their immigration status restored.

In conjunction with the campaign, the LAJC announced the launch of a crowdfunding campaign designed to support the legal expenses related to Aziz v. Trump.

== Darweesh v. Trump ==
Darweesh v. Trump
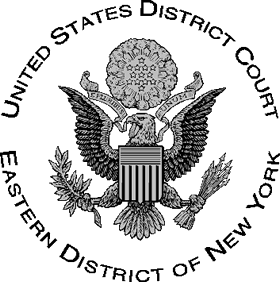
- Court: United States District Court for the Eastern District of New York
- Full case name: Hameed Khalid Darweesh and Haider Sameer Abdulkhaleq Alshawi, Plaintiffs, v. Donald J. Trump, in his official capacity as President of the United States of America, Defendants, et al.
- Citation: No. 1:17-cv-00480

Darweesh v. Trump, No. 1:17-cv-00480 (E.D.N.Y. 2017), currently pending in the United States District Court for the Eastern District of New York, challenges the validity of the executive order. On January 28, 2017, the court granted a temporary emergency stay halting parts of the order. The court has neither let the affected people into the country nor ruled on the constitutionality of the order itself.

=== Background ===
On the day Trump signed the executive order, Hameed Darweesh and Haider Alshawi landed at John F. Kennedy International Airport and were detained by U.S. Customs and Border Protection. They were forbidden from meeting with their attorneys or applying for asylum. Darweesh served in Iraq for over a decade as an interpreter on behalf of the United States Army 101st Airborne Division and as an electrician and contractor.

On January 28, 2017, the American Civil Liberties Union filed a civil action against President Trump, alleging that enforcement officials' actions, pursuant to the executive order barring citizens of specific countries from entry into the United States, are in violation of procedural due process under the Fifth Amendment of the United States Constitution; the Immigration and Nationality Act of 1965; The Convention Against Torture; the Foreign Affairs Reform and Restructuring Act of 1998; and the Administrative Procedure Act by denying foreign nationals who possess validly issued visas the right to enter the United States.

Plaintiffs also allege that the executive order itself "discriminates against Petitioners on the basis of their country of origin and religion, and without sufficient justification, and therefore violates the equal protection component of the Due Process Clause of the Fifth Amendment. Additionally, the EO was substantially motivated by animus toward—and has a disparate effect on—Muslims, which also violates the equal protection component of the Due Process Clause of the Fifth Amendment".

The suit seeks a declaratory judgment and an injunction directed at President Trump, and a writ of habeas corpus ordering the release of any person currently detained as a result of President Trump's executive order barring entry into the United States from predominantly Muslim countries.

=== Class action certification ===
On January 28, 2017, the American Civil Liberties Union filed a motion asking the US District Court to certify the case as a class action lawsuit and asked the Court to certify class status for all persons affected by President Trump's Executive Order. The motion stated "... Petitioners and the proposed class, by and through their attorneys, hereby respectfully move this Court for an order certifying a representative class of Petitioners, pursuant to United States ex rel. Sero v. Preiser, 506 F.2d 1115 (2d Cir. 1974). Petitioners ask this Court to certify a class consisting of all individuals with refugee applications approved by U.S. Citizenship and Immigration Services as part of the U.S. Refugee Admissions Program, holders of valid immigrant and non-immigrant visas, and other individuals from Iraq, Syria, Iran, Sudan, Libya, Somalia, and Yemen legally authorized to enter the United States, but who have been or will be denied entry to the United States on the basis of the January 27, 2017 Executive Order. ...".

=== Partial stay of executive order ===
Stay order

On January 28, 2017, Ann Donnelly, a Brooklyn federal judge, issued an emergency stay that temporarily blocks the U.S. government from sending people out of the country after they have landed at a U.S. airport with valid visas, refugees with approved applications, and people authorized to enter the United States from the seven nations who are subject to the immigration ban. The stay was granted following the filing of an Emergency Motion to Stay President Trump's Executive Order by the ACLU attorneys who are opposing removal of their clients from the United States. The Court ruled that a stay was warranted since the Plaintiff's habeas petitions were pending review before the Court. The stay has subsequently been extended until February 21.

=== Department of Homeland Security official statement ===
The Department of Homeland Security issued the following statement on January 29, 2017:

Upon issuance of the court orders yesterday, U.S. Customs and Border Protection (CBP) immediately began taking steps to comply with the orders. Concurrently, the Department of Homeland Security continues to work with our partners in the Departments of Justice and State to implement President Trump's executive order on protecting the nation from foreign terrorist entry into the United States. We are committed to ensuring that all individuals affected by the executive orders, including those affected by the court orders, are being provided all rights afforded under the law. We are also working closely with airline partners to prevent travelers who would not be granted entry under the executive orders from boarding international flights to the U.S. Therefore, we do not anticipate that further individuals traveling by air to the United States will be affected. As Secretary Kelly previously stated, in applying the provisions of the president's executive order, the entry of lawful permanent residents is in the national interest. Accordingly, absent significant derogatory information indicating a serious threat to public safety and welfare, lawful permanent resident status will be a dispositive factor in our case-by-case determinations. We are and will remain in compliance with judicial orders. We are and will continue to enforce President Trump's executive order humanely and with professionalism. DHS will continue to protect the homeland.

== Louhghalam v. Trump ==
Louhghalam et al. v. Trump
- Court: United States District Court for the District of Massachusetts
- Full case name: Arghavan Louhghalam and Mazdak Pourabdollah Tootkaboni, Plaintiffs, v. Donald J. Trump, in his official capacity as President of the United States of America, et al., Defendants
- Decided: February 3, 2017 (declining preliminary injunction)
- Citation: No. 17-cv-10154

Louhghalam v. Trump, No. 17-cv-10154 (D.Mass. 2017), currently pending in the United States District Court for the District of Massachusetts, challenges the executive order. The suit arose from the detention of individuals at Logan International Airport in Massachusetts from countries listed in the order.

=== Background ===
On the day Trump signed the executive order, Plaintiffs at Logan International Airport in Boston were detained by U.S. Customs and Border Protection.

On January 28, 2017, Mazdak Pourabdollah Tootkaboni and Arghavan Louhghalam were detained at Logan International Airport by Customs Officers. Tootkaboni and Louhghalam, a married couple, are both engineering professors at the University of Massachusetts Dartmouth who hold doctorates from Johns Hopkins University. They are Iranian nationals who are lawful permanent residents of the United States (i.e., Green Card holders). They had flown from Charles de Gaulle Airport in Paris back to Massachusetts after finishing a weeklong conference on sustainable engineering held in Marseille. The professors were released after being detained for about three hours.

After being detained, Tootkaboni and Louhghalam, represented by Susan Church Boston judges temporarily block Trump edict on immigration - The Boston Globe of the American Immigration Lawyers Association and Matt Segal of the ACLU of Massachusetts, filed a civil action in the United States District Court for the District of Massachusetts, filing a petition for a writ of habeas corpus and a complaint seeking declaratory and injunctive relief. They raised five causes of action in their original petition: (1) denial of procedural due process; (2) violation of the freedom of religion protections of the First Amendment (Tootkaboni and Louhghalam allege that they were singled out because they are Muslim); (3) violation of the Equal Protection Clause; (4) violation of the Administrative Procedure Act; and (5) violation of the Religious Freedom Restoration Act (RFRA).

=== Court orders ===
The temporary restraining order in Louhghalam v. Trump was issued on January 29, 2017.

On January 29, 2017, U.S. District Judge Allison D. Burroughs and Magistrate Judge Judith Gail Dein of the U.S. District Court for the District of Massachusetts issued a temporary restraining order (TRO) directed to defendant Trump, which prohibited removal from the United States of any person with a valid visa, someone awarded refugee status, or lawful permanent residents, and mandated that any secondary screening process must comply with 8 U.S.C. § 1101(a)(13)(c).

The order barred the detention of those "who, absent the Executive Order, would be legally authorized to enter the United States." Further, the judges ordered the U.S. Customs and Border Protection to notify airlines with flights arriving at Logan Airport of the court order and "the fact that individuals on these flights will not be detained or returned based solely on the basis of the Executive Order."

On February 3, 2017, United States District Judge Nathaniel M. Gorton declined to impose any injunctive relief and declined to renew the temporary restraining order which expired on February 5, 2017.

== Mohammed v. United States ==
Mohammed v. Trump
- Court: United States District Court for the Central District of California
- Citation: No. 2:17-cv-00786

Mohammed v. United States, No. 2:17-cv-00786 (C.D. Cal. 2017), is currently pending in the United States District Court for the Central District of California. The plaintiffs in the lawsuit are a group of 28 Yemeni-born people, including both U.S. citizens living in the United States and their family members who were in Yemen, but had secured immigrant visas to come to the United States. This case does not deal with refugees or non-immigrant visas (such as business, tourist, or student visas).

=== Temporary restraining order ===
On January 31, 2017, U.S. District Judge Andre Birotte Jr. granted a sweeping temporary restraining order, barring U.S. officials "removing, detaining or blocking the entry of plaintiffs or any other person ... with a valid immigrant visa" from one of the seven nations named in Trump's order. The ruling also barred the official defendants from "cancelling validly obtained and issued immigrant visas of plaintiffs." The ruling required defendants to return plaintiffs passports with valid visas.

== Sarsour v. Trump ==
Sarsour v. Trump
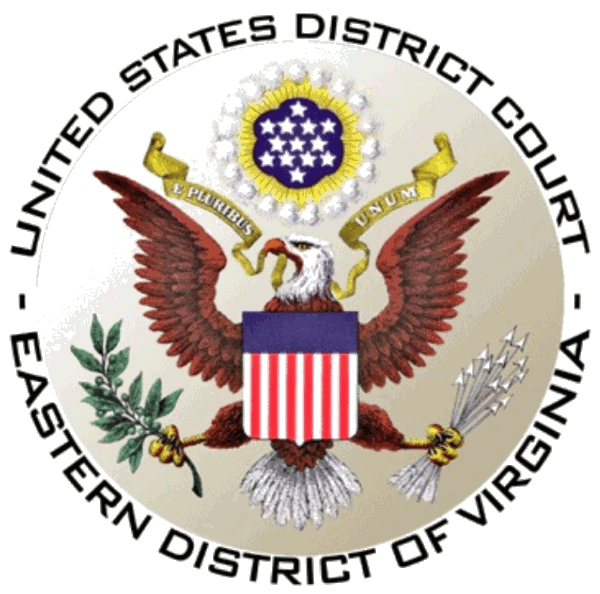
- Court: United States District Court for the Eastern District of Virginia
- Full case name: LINDA SARSOUR, RASHIDA TLAIB, ZAHRA BILLOO, NIHAD AWAD, COREY SAYLOR, DAWUD WALID, BASIM ELKARRA, HUSSAM AYLOUSH, HASSAN SHIBLY, ALIA SALEM, ADAM SOLTANI, IMRAN SIDDIQI, JULIA SHEARSON, NAMIRA ISLAM, KAREN DABDOUB, JOHN DOE NO. 1-10, JANE DOE NO. 1-2, Plaintiffs, v. Donald J. Trump, in his official capacity as President of the United States of America, et al., Defendants
- Citation: No. 1:17-cv-00120

Sarsour v. Trump or CAIR v. Trump, No. 1:17-cv-00120 (E.D.Va. 2017), currently pending in the United States District Court for the Eastern District of Virginia, challenges the validity of the order.

On January 30, 2017, the Council on American-Islamic Relations (CAIR), a Muslim civil rights and advocacy organization, held a news conference in Washington, D.C. and announced the filing of a federal lawsuit in the United States District Court for the Eastern District of Virginia on behalf of individuals challenging the constitutionality of President Trump's recent executive order. The lawsuit alleges, among other things, that the executive order is unconstitutional because it targets and is discriminatory towards Muslims.

Linda Sarsour is one of many plaintiffs. The plaintiffs allege religious discrimination on basis the executive order targets Muslims. They bring four causes of action in their petition: (1) violation of the Establishment Clause; (2) violation of the Free Exercise Clause; (3) violation of due process rights; and (4) violations of the Administrative Procedure Act. The plaintiffs seek a declaratory judgment that the executive order violates the Constitution and an injunction staying its effect.

Judge Trenga refused to use the President's past statements as evidence of the order's discriminatory nature. The case is suspended until resolution of International Refugee Assistance Project v. Trump.

== Hawaii v. Trump ==
State of Hawaii v. Donald J. Trump
- Court: United States District Court for the District of Hawaii
- Full case name: State of Hawaii and Ismail Elshikh, Plaintiffs, v. Donald J. Trump, in his official capacity as President of the United States of America, et al., Defendants
- Citation: No. 1:17-cv-00050

On March 7, 2017, the state of Hawaii brought a civil action challenging the executive order, asking for declaratory judgment and an injunction halting the order. The State of Hawaii moved for leave to file an Amended Complaint pertaining to Executive Order 13780. Doug Chin, Hawaii's attorney general, publicly stated, "This new executive order is nothing more than Muslim Ban 2.0. Under the pretense of national security, it still targets immigrants and refugees. It leaves the door open for even further restrictions." US appeals court previously pointed out that no citizen from the countries on the list ever committed a terrorist attack in the USA. Hawaii's legal challenge to the revised ban cites top White House advisor Stephen Miller as saying the revised travel ban is meant to achieve the same basic policy outcome as the original.

The Amended Complaint lists eight specific causes of action pertaining to Executive Order 13780:

1. Violation of the First Amendment Establishment Clause claiming the travel ban targets Muslims
2. Violation of the Fifth Amendment Equal Protection clause
3. Violation of the Fifth Amendment Substantive Due Process clause
4. Violation of the Fifth Amendment Procedural Due Process
5. Violation of the Immigration and Nationality Act 8 U.S.C. § 1152(a)(1)(A) and 8 U.S.C. § 1182(f) and 8 U.S.C. § 1185(a)
6. Violations of the Religious Freedom Restoration Act 42 U.S.C. § 2000bb-1(a)
7. Substantive Violation of the Administrative Procedure Act through Violations of the Constitution, Immigration and Nationality Act, and Arbitrary and Capricious Action 5 U.S.C. § 706(2)(A)–(C).
8. Procedural Violation of the Administrative Procedure Act 5 U.S.C. § 706(2)(D), 5 U.S.C. § 551(1), and 5 U.S.C. § 553

On March 15, 2017, United States District Judge Derrick Watson issued a temporary restraining order preventing sections 2 and 6 of executive order 13780 from going into effect. In his order, Judge Watson ruled that the State of Hawaii showed a strong likelihood of success on their Establishment Clause claim in asserting that Executive Order 13780 was in fact a "Muslim ban".

On March 29, 2017, Judge Watson extended his order blocking the ban for a longer duration. The DOJ appealed this ruling.

On May 15, 2017, a panel of the Ninth Circuit heard arguments on whether to uphold the nationwide injunction. Acting Solicitor General of the United States Jeffrey Wall and Hawaii's attorney, Neal Katyal, appeared before Circuit Judges Ronald M. Gould, Michael Daly Hawkins, and Richard Paez for an hour of oral arguments in Seattle's William Kenzo Nakamura United States Courthouse. On June 12, 2017, a unanimous panel of the Ninth Circuit partially upheld Judge Watson's injunction. In its anonymous per curiam decision, the court found President Trump's order violated the relevant statute, and so must be enjoined. However, the court found Judge Watson should have avoided the constitutional question, and that he should not have enjoined the purely internal government vetting review. On June 19, 2017, Judge Watson complied with the decision of the Ninth Circuit and curtailed the injunction such that the injunction would exempt, "internal review procedures that do not burden individuals outside of the executive branch of the federal government."

On July 7, 2017, the United States Court of Appeals for the Ninth Circuit rejected Hawaii's request to clarify Supreme Court's ruling and limit the scope of the Trump's ban to include grandparents and stated that the Court of Appeals does not have the authority to interpret Supreme Courts' ruling now but could in the future issue injunctions but only on individual basis if it believed government's interpretation harmed a particular person.

=== Supreme Court decision ===
On June 26, 2018, the Supreme Court upheld Trump's Presidential Proclamation 9645 in a split 5–4 decision largely on ideological lines. Delivering the majority opinion, Chief Justice Roberts concluded the language of §1182(f) of the Immigration and Nationality Act of 1952 was clear in giving the President broad authority to suspend the entry of non-citizens into the country and Trump's Proclamation 9645 did not exceed any textual limit on the President's authority. Similarly, the majority of the court rejected challenges to §1152(a)(1)(A) which bars discrimination on basis of nationality. According to Roberts, §1182(f) defines the universe of non-citizens and within that universe, §1152(a)(1)(A) prohibits discrimination on basis of nationality. Lastly, the Court rejected Hawaii's challenge based on the Constitution's establishment clause which prohibits favoring one religion over another. Roberts pointed out that even though five of the seven nations are Muslim Majority, by that fact alone "does not support an inference of religious hostility, given that the policy covers just 8% of the world's Muslim population and is limited to countries that were previously designated by Congress or prior administrations as posing national security risks." Additionally, three Muslim Majority countries have since been dropped from the original Travel Ban of January 2017. Additionally, there are waiver exemptions such as medical that people from banned nations are eligible for. In conclusion, Roberts says Trump has shown a "sufficient national security justification".

=== Abandonment ===
On August 13, 2018, the plaintiffs, State of Hawaii and the Muslim Association of Hawaii, dropped the lawsuit, effectively ending the litigation.

== International Refugee Assistance Project v. Trump ==
On the same date that Judge Watson in Hawaii blocked parts of the order Judge Theodore D. Chuang of the U.S. District of Maryland, who was formerly Deputy General Counsel for the Department of Homeland Security, issued a temporary restraining order that blocked the revised executive order's section 2(c), which would have banned travel to the U.S. by citizens from six designated countries. The basis of Judge Chuang's order is violation of the Establishment Clause of the United States Constitution. Judge Chuang also noted that the order was in violation of the Immigration and Nationality Act of 1965, which modifies the Immigration and Nationality Act of 1952 to say "No person shall receive any preference or priority or be discriminated against in the issuance of an immigrant visa because of his race, sex, nationality, place of birth, or place of residence," but only in that it placed a ban on immigrant visa issuance based on nationality. Judge Chuang noted that the statute does not prohibit the President from barring entry into the United States or the issuance of non-immigrant visas on the basis of nationality. The Trump Administration appealed the ruling to the United States Court of Appeals for the Fourth Circuit, which scheduled oral argument for May 8; the Justice Department has said it will file a motion to encourage the court to rule sooner. On March 31, approximately 30 top U.S. universities filed an amicus brief with the Fourth Circuit opposing the travel ban.

On May 8, acting Solicitor General of the United States Jeffrey Wall and American Civil Liberties Union attorney Omar Jadwat appeared before the 13-judge en banc Fourth Circuit for two hours of oral arguments in Richmond, Virginia's Lewis F. Powell Jr. United States Courthouse. Judges J. Harvie Wilkinson III, whose daughter is married to Wall, and Allyson Kay Duncan recused themselves.

On May 25, the Fourth Circuit upheld the March ruling of the Maryland district court, continuing the block of the travel ban by a vote of 10-3 because it violated the Establishment Clause of the United States Constitution.

The acting Solicitor General next applied for a stay of execution from the Supreme Court of the United States, which then scheduled all briefing to be concluded by June 21, the day before the Court's last conference of the term. Hawaii's outside counsel in a related case, Neal Katyal, told the Court he was "in Utah with very little internet access" for the rest of the week, so it granted him an extra day to file the state's response brief.

== Other suits ==
A variety of other suits challenging the executive order were brought. The bulk of cases filed were habeas corpus petitions arising from persons detained or deported at U.S. airports; many of these cases were voluntarily dismissed, "presumably because the petitioner has since been released." Among these were Fasihianifard v. Trump, Alqaissi v. Trump, Sabounchi v. Trump, Morshed v. Trump, Alinejad v. Trump, Ahmed v. Trump, and Jalayer v. Trump, and Al Saeedi v. Trump in the U.S. District Court for the Eastern District of New York, Azimi v. Trump in the U.S. District Court for the Western District of New York, Dhaif Allah Ahmed Mohammed v. United States in the U.S. District Court for the Central District of California, Hassanpour v. Trump in the U.S. District Court for the Northern District of Texas, and Doe v. Trump in the U.S. District Court for the Western District of Washington, all of which were all voluntarily dismissed as other cases proceeded. The last case, Doe, is an example; in that case, two "John Doe" plaintiffs filed a petition for a writ of habeas corpus and a complaint for relief after being detained by U.S. Customs and Border Protection officers at the Seattle–Tacoma International Airport in SeaTac, Washington. The district court issued a temporary stay of removal directed to Trump, prohibiting removal from the U.S. of any of the plaintiffs to the action, and the case was voluntarily dismissed.

California v. Trump in the U.S. District Court for the Northern District of California—a private attorney general action, not brought by the State of California—was dismissed for lack of subject-matter jurisdiction.

== International law ==
United Nations High Commissioner for Human Rights Zeid Ra'ad al Hussein has expressed the view that the executive order violates international human rights law. Some legal scholars believe that the executive order breaches the United States' obligations as a party to both the 1951 Convention relating to the Status of Refugees (Geneva Refugee Convention) and the United Nations Convention against Torture. The latter treaty imposes an absolute duty upon state parties "not to return a person to a state where they may face torture or other serious harms." In a telephone call with Trump, German Chancellor Angela Merkel expressed the view of the German government that Trump's executive order ran counter to the duties of all signatory states to the Geneva Refugee Convention "to take in war refugees on humanitarian grounds."

== See also ==
- List of lawsuits involving Donald Trump
- Legal challenges to Executive Order 13768
- Chae Chan Ping v. United States, a court case in 1889 of a similar nature (a United States resident of Chinese origin who was not allowed to return due to a law, the Scott Act, forbidding re-entry, that was passed while he was en route)
