= Post-election lawsuits related to the 2020 U.S. presidential election from Pennsylvania =

In direct response to Pennsylvania Democratic Party v. Boockvar and the 2020 United States presidential election in Pennsylvania, the Donald Trump 2020 presidential campaign launched numerous lawsuits contesting the purview of the Pennsylvania Supreme Court and the election processes of Pennsylvania. All of these were either dismissed or dropped.

The lawsuits filed after Election day were Bognet et al. v. Boockvar et al. and Donald J. Trump for President v. Boockvar et al.. Donald J. Trump for President v. Boockvar et al. was dismissed without comment by the Supreme Court on February 22, 2021. On April 19, 2021, more than five months after the November 3, 2020 election, the Supreme Court declined to hear the outstanding case brought by former Republican congressional candidate Jim Bognet, dismissing it without comment.

== Summary of lawsuits ==
Pennsylvania post-election lawsuits related to the 2020 United States presidential election
First filing date	Case	Court	Docket no(s)	Outcome	Comments	References
November 22, 2020	Bognet v. Boockvar	U.S. District Court for the Western District of Pennsylvania	3:20-cv-215	Dismissed	Dismissed without comment by the Supreme Court on February 22, 2021	Also called Bognet v. Secretary Commonwealth of Pennsylvania Asked a federal court to overturn the Pennsylvania Supreme Court's decision allowing the receipt of ballots after Election Day. Dismissed by the District Court, appealed to 3rd Circuit Court of Appeals; dismissed, and appealed to the Supreme Court which dismissed it without comment on February 22, 2021
November 9, 2020	Donald J. Trump for President v. Boockvar	U.S. District Court for the Middle District of Pennsylvania	No. 20-3371; No. 20-3384 (3rd Cir. ) 4:20-CV-02078	Dismissed	Trump Campaign lawsuit filed against Democratic counties in Pennsylvania. The suit challenged the results of the election and asked the court to prohibit the certification of results. The Trump campaign filed an appeal to the U.S. Court of Appeals for the Third Circuit on November 22, 2020. Judge Stephanos Bibas released a sharply-worded legal opinion on November 27, which stated: "Charges of unfairness are serious. But calling an election unfair does not make it so. Charges require specific allegations and then proof. We have neither here." in regard to the allegation that the "...District Court abused its discretion in not letting the Campaign amend its complaint a second time."	
November 5, 2020	Donald J. Trump for President v. Philadelphia Cty. Bd. of Elections	U.S. District Court for the Eastern District of Pennsylvania	Civ. No. 20-5533	Dropped	Lawsuit about the number of poll watchers. After the parties to the lawsuit agreed to allow 60 observers each from the Democratic and Republican parties, the court dismissed the lawsuit in light of this agreement and denied the emergency injunction motion without prejudice as it was moot.	
November 4, 2020	Donald J. Trump for President v. Boockvar and Cty. Bds. of Elections	Pennsylvania Commonwealth Court	602-MD-2020	Ruled	The court concluded that Kathy Boockvar, Secretary of the Commonwealth of Pennsylvania, lacked statutory authority to prolong the deadline for proof of identification and ordered for such segregated ballots not to be counted. Dispositive Ruling	
November 5, 2020	Donald J. Trump for President v. Montgomery Cty. Bd. of Elections	Pennsylvania Court of Common Pleas, Montgomery County	NO. 2020-18680, C-48-CV-2020-6915	Denied and appeal withdrawn	A petition to compel the Montgomery County Board of Elections to stop counting mail-in-ballots. November 13, 2020, petition was denied and the Montgomery County Board of Elections was ordered to count the 592 ballots. The decision was appealed 3 days later on November 16, but the appeal was withdrawn later that day.	
November 9, 2020	Donald J. Trump for President v. Bucks Cty. Bd. of Elections	Pennsylvania Commonwealth Court	1191 CD 2020	Dismissed		
November 10, 2020	In re: Canvass of Absentee and Mail-In Ballots of November 3, 2020, Gen. Election	Pennsylvania Supreme Court; Pennsylvania Court of Common Pleas, Philadelphia County	31 EAP 2020, 32 EAP 2020, 33 EAP 2020, 34 EAP 2020, 35 EAP 2020; 20110894, 20110895, 20110896, 20110897, 20110898	Dismissed	Transferred to Pennsylvania Supreme Court; appealed	Dismissed without comment by the Supreme Court on February 22, 2021
November 3, 2020	In re: Canvassing Observation	Pennsylvania Supreme Court Pennsylvania Commonwealth Court; Pennsylvania Court of Common Pleas, Philadelphia County	30 EAP 2020 (S.C. of PA) 1094 CD 2020 (PA Commw. Ct); 2020 Pa. LEXIS 5879; 2020 WL 6737895	Ruled	On November 3, 2020, the Trump campaign filed a complaint alleging that their poll watchers could not see or had meaningful access to the ballots. Pennsylvania Court of Common Pleas in Philadelphia County denied the oral petition on grounds that the witness provided could "observe the opening and sorting of ballots". The Trump campaign appealed to the Pennsylvania Commonwealth Court and the decision was reversed on the grounds that all poll watchers "be permitted to observe all aspects of the canvassing process within 6 feet, while adhering to all COVID-19 protocols, including, wearing masks and maintaining social distancing." State officials appealed to the Pennsylvania Supreme Court, which reversed the Commonwealth Court's decision because the statutes did not set minimum distances for observers. The Trump campaign appealed to the United States Supreme Court on December 20, 2020, but this was dismissed without comment.	
November 10, 2020	Pirkle v. Wolf	U.S. District Court for the Middle District of Pennsylvania	4:20-cv-02088-MWB	Dismissed	Attempt to block all votes from Philadelphia, Montgomery, Delaware and Allegheny Counties from being included in the state total. Consolidated with Donald J. Trump for President v. Philadelphia County Board of Elections (4:20-CV-02078).	
November 3, 2020	Hamm v. Boockvar	Pennsylvania Commonwealth Court	600 MD 2020	Ruled	Whether guidance issued by the secretary of state allowing voters who cast defective ballots to re-vote is illegal. The trial court ordered remedied ballots to be segregated pending further proceedings. Dispositive Ruling	
November 4, 2020	Barnette v. Lawrence	U.S. District Court for the Eastern District of Pennsylvania	2:20-cv-05477-PBT	Dismissed		
November 12, 2020	Ziccarelli v. Allegheny County Board of Elections	Pennsylvania Supreme Court; Pennsylvania Commonwealth Court; Pennsylvania Court of Common Pleas, Allegheny County	1162 CD 2020 (Penn. Commonw. Ct.); GD 20-011654	Dismissed after appeal	On November 18, 2020, the state's Court of Common Pleas denied the plaintiffs request, ordering the votes to be counted. On November 19, 2020, after appeal, the Pennsylvania Commonwealth Court reversed the Court of Common Pleas decision and ruled that the 2,349 ballots in question should not be counted. On November 23, 2020, after appeal, Pennsylvania Supreme Court reversed the decision of the Commonwealth Court and affirmed the decision of the state's Court of Common Pleas reinstating the decision of the Allegheny County Board of Elections to count 2,349 ballots.	
November 3, 2020	In re: Motion for Injunctive Relief of Northampton Cty. Republican Committee	Pennsylvania Court of Common Pleas, Northampton County	C-48-CV-2020-6915	Dismissed	Court denied oral motion.	
November 25, 2020	Kelly v. Pennsylvania	Supreme Court of the United States Supreme Court of Pennsylvania Pennsylvania Commonwealth Court	No. 20A98 (US Supreme Ct.) 68 MAP 2020 (PA Supreme Ct.) 620 MD 2020 (PA Commonw. Ct.)	Denied	Plaintiffs asked to stop certification of election results, challenging the legality of no-excuse mail-in ballots. Lower court granted request; Pennsylvania appealed to state's supreme Court. State Supreme Court dismissed the case. Plaintiffs appealed to the Supreme Court of the United States and an application for injunctive relief was filed to Justice Alito. The court "without comment" denied the case on December 8, 2020.	
December 20, 2020	Donald J. Trump for President v. Boockvar	US Supreme Court		Dismissed	Dismissed without comment by the Supreme Court on February 22, 2021	Supreme Court appeal of multiple Pennsylvania lawsuits, dismissed without comment on February 22, 2021

== Barnette v. Lawrence ==
On November 4, 2020, 4th congressional district candidate Kathy Barnette sued Montgomery County officials in federal district court. Barnette claimed the county's board of elections violated the state's election code by inspecting ballot envelopes for missing information, a process known as pre-canvassing, and by giving voters a chance to correct such deficiencies. Barnett also claimed that the federal equal protection clause was violated because only certain voters were allowed the chance to cure. Barnette asked the county to reject any affected ballots. On November 6, Judge Timothy J. Savage denied the plaintiffs' request.

== Donald J. Trump for President v. Boockvar ==
=== U.S. District Court case ===
Donald J. Trump for President v. Boockvar is a lawsuit filed in U.S. District Court on November 9 by the Trump campaign against Democratic counties in Pennsylvania. The campaign challenged the results of the election, alleging and asked the court to prohibit the certification of results. The Ohio-based Porter Wright Morris & Arthur law firm that represented the Trump campaign withdrew from the case on November 13, and Linda A. Kerns, a Republican attorney also representing the Trump campaign, asked the judge for permission to withdraw from the case on November 16. (Note: See also Pirkle v. Wolf.) Overall, the case saw three different sets of lawyers within a week.

When the judge asked Trump's lawyer, Rudy Giuliani, on why the plaintiffs did not advance legal claims based on voter fraud, Giuliani replied that "this is not a fraud case". Giuliani had previously made public and false claims of "fraud", "absolute fraud" in the election. FellowTrump lawyer Linda Kerns also agreed that this lawsuit was not based on "allegations of fraud or misconduct".

Judge Matthew W. Brann dismissed the case with prejudice on November 21, citing "strained legal arguments without merit and speculative accusations", noting that "[i]n the United States of America, this cannot justify the disenfranchisement of a single voter, let alone all the voters of its sixth most populated state ... [o]ur people, laws and institutions demand more". He likened the Trump team argument to "Frankenstein's Monster", and characterized the requested remedy to disqualify nearly seven million votes as "unhinged from the underlying right being asserted".

=== Appeals Court case ===
The Trump campaign and other plaintiffs filed an appeal with the United States Court of Appeals for the Third Circuit on November 22. In their revised brief, the campaign asked that the election be decertified and they be permitted to take a sample consisting of 1.5 million mail ballots to determine how many were defective, and deduct those votes from Biden's total.

On November 27, a three-judge panel for the Third Circuit Court of Appeals rejected the Trump campaign's attempt to undo Pennsylvania's vote certification, with the judges ruling that the Trump campaign's "claims have no merit." The panel stated that the Trump campaign was challenging far fewer ballots than Biden's margin of victory, and "it never claims fraud or that any votes were cast by illegal voters."

The panel praised the District Court for being "fast, fair, patient" in handling this case. It ruled that the District Court was correct in preventing the Trump campaign from conducting a second amendment of its complaint. The proposed amendment had not changed the fact that the Trump campaign had not alleged that it was being treated worse than the Biden campaign, stated the panel. Overall, "calling an election unfair does not make it so. Charges require specific allegations and then proof. We have neither here", stated the panel.

Of the three Appeal Court judges, Stephanos Bibas, who delivered the opinion, was appointed by Trump, while judges D. Brooks Smith and Michael Chagares were appointed by Republican president George W. Bush. Trump campaign attorney Jenna Ellis reacted to the verdict by condemning the "activist judicial machinery in Pennsylvania". It was dismissed without comment by the Supreme Court on February 22, 2021.

== Donald J. Trump for President v. Boockvar and Cty. Bds. of Elections ==
Donald J. Trump for President v. Kathy Boockvar and County Boards of Elections is a lawsuit filed in the Commonwealth Court of Pennsylvania on November 4, by the Trump campaign. The campaign challenged guidance from the Pennsylvania Secretary of State Kathy Boockvar, who told voters they had until November 12 to provide proof of identification in order for their ballots to be counted, three days past the deadline set by state law. The judge ruled that ballots are not to be counted if identification has not been shown by November 9. This ruling affected a small number of ballots that were not included in the vote count.

== Donald J. Trump for President v. Bucks Cty. Bd. of Elections ==
Donald J. Trump for President Inc. v. Bucks County Board of Elections is a lawsuit filed by the Trump campaign and others in the Pennsylvania Court of Common Pleas on November 9, 2020. The plaintiffs appealed the decision of the board to count over 2,200 ballots that lacked a date or voter address, or were not sealed with secrecy sleeves, claiming the votes are invalid. The lawyers for the Trump campaign have signed an agreement that they "do not allege, and there is no evidence of, any fraud in connection with the challenged ballots." They also declared that they were not alleging votes from dead people, "misconduct", or "impropriety" related to those ballots, and had no evidence of such happenings.

Judge Robert O. Baldi denied the plaintiffs petition and ordered all ballots to be counted. The Trump campaign appealed the decision; on November 25, the Commonwealth Court also ruled that all ballots should be counted.

The Trump campaign filed an emergency petition in the Pennsylvania Supreme Court, asking for review of the case, and on December 8, the court denied the petition for appeal.

== Donald J. Trump for President v. Montgomery Cty. Bd. of Elections ==
Donald J. Trump for President v. Montgomery County Board of Elections is a lawsuit filed in the state's trial court on November 5, in which the Trump campaign sought to stop Montgomery County from counting ballots. The county's Board of Elections allowed about 600 voters to fill in missing information on ballot envelopes before Election Day. The campaign argued for the ballots to be disqualified, but the judge ruled the instructions provided to voters were consistent with election law.

During the hearing, the judge asked the lawyer for the Trump campaign, Jonathan Goldstein, if Goldstein was "claiming that there is any fraud" or "any undue or improper influence upon the elector with respect to these 592 ballots". Goldstein replied 'No.'

Goldstein's answer to the court was consistent with the pleadings in the case brought by Goldstein which pleadings did not allege fraud and only made a technical challenge to the counting of certain ballots due to certain facial defects in those ballots. The Bucks County Common Pleas Court ruled the ballots should be counted. Pennsylvania's intermediate appellate court, the Commonwealth Court, later ruled that certain Allegheny County ballots to which a similar challenge was made should not be counted for the reasons Goldstein argued in the Bucks County pleading, namely that the ballots did not comply with Pennsylvania's laws governing the technical requirements of casting a ballot.

== Donald J. Trump for President v. Philadelphia Cty. Bd. of Elections ==
Donald J. Trump for President v. Philadelphia County Board of Elections is a lawsuit filed in federal court on November 5, in which the Trump campaign sought to stop ballot counting in Philadelphia. The campaign argued that poll observers were not allowed in the counting room, but later admitted some observers were present. No ballots were at issue, and the case was settled upon mutual party agreement that Republicans and Democrats could have each have up to 60 poll watchers present to observe vote counting. The admission that Trump's observers were in the counting room contradicted Trump's later claims that his observers were prevented from entering vote counting rooms in Pennsylvania.

One of the Trump campaign's lawyers in the case, Jerome Marcus, filed a motion in federal court on January 7, 2021, arguing that Trump "has used the lawyer’s services to perpetrate a crime" and that Marcus should therefore be allowed to withdraw from the case as a matter of principle.

== Hamm v. Boockvar ==
Hamm v. Boockvar is a lawsuit filed in the Commonwealth Court of Pennsylvania on November 3. Pennsylvania Secretary of State, Kathy Boockvar, issued guidance that local election officials could allow voters who cast defective ballots to re-do their vote by casting a provisional ballot. The plaintiffs, several candidates who ran for office, argued that such guidance is illegal. The court ordered counties to set aside any provisional ballots cast by voters who sought to remedy defective initial ballots, and said it would rule on those ballots' validity at a later date.

== In re: Canvass of Absentee and Mail-In Ballots of November 3, 2020, Gen. Election ==
Each lawsuit in this set of five against Philadelphia County Board of Elections is called In re: Canvass of Absentee and Mail-In Ballots of November 3, 2020, General Election. Each identifies a different issue about how voters completed the declaration on the outer ballot envelope. The five lawsuits were filed in the PA Court of Common Pleas (the state's trial court) on November 10, in which the Trump campaign sought to disqualify over 8,000 absentee ballots counted by state officials. The ballots had outer envelopes which were signed by the voters but lacked various other information filled out on the declaration on the envelope. Judge James Crumlish denied all challenges to the ballots.

On appeal to the PA Commonwealth Court, the five cases were combined into one. Before oral arguments, the case was transferred to the Pennsylvania Supreme Court, where the court rejected the Trump campaign's appeals on November 23.

== In re: Canvassing Observation ==
In re: Canvassing Observation is a lawsuit filed on November 3, in which the Trump campaign sought closer access for poll observers to watch vote counting. The trial court ruled against the campaign, that a 15-foot (4.6 m) distance was adequate. On appeal, the Commonwealth Court of Pennsylvania sided with the campaign and ordered that poll observers be allowed to watch from a distance of 6 feet (1.8 m). On November 9, the state filed an appeal to the Pennsylvania Supreme Court.

The Supreme Court of Pennsylvania ruled 5–2 on November 17 against the Trump campaign, saying Pennsylvania law requires only that observers must be allowed in the room where ballots are counted but does not set a minimum distance between them and the counting tables; local county officials are left to decide. Chief Justice Thomas Saylor dissented, saying he would have declared the issue moot.

== In re: Motion for Injunctive Relief of Northampton Cty. Republican Committee ==
On November 3, 2020, a group including Republican candidates and officials made an oral motion in state court, asking the court to prevent the Northampton Board of Elections from identifying cancelled ballots in order to help voters cure them; the court denied the motion.

== Kelly v. Pennsylvania ==
On November 22, 2020, U.S. Representative Mike Kelly and six other Republican representatives filed a suit in the Commonwealth Court of Pennsylvania that claims that the Pennsylvania General Assembly had no authority under the state constitution to enact no-excuse mail-in voting. They sued to stop the certification of electors until the issue could be resolved. The legislation in question is Act 77 (Act of October 31, 2019, P.L 552, No. 77). It was passed on October 31, 2019, and allowed voting by mail without providing an excuse, which was previously required. The bill was passed in the Republican-majority assembly with near-unanimous support by the Republicans. Pennsylvania joined 31 other states and Washington, D.C., with mail-in voting without excuses.

On November 25, Judge Patricia McCullough ruled to halt further state certifications pending a hearing. The state attorney general responded by filing an immediate appeal to the state Supreme Court, which triggered an automatic stay on Judge McCullough's order. On November 25, the Department of State issued a press release dated November 24, stating: "Following certification of the presidential vote submitted by all 67 counties late Monday, Secretary of State Kathy Boockvar today certified the results of the November 3 election in Pennsylvania for president and vice president of the United States." Having issued the press release (without updating the certified results on the State website), the defendants sought to moot the case. On November 27, Judge McCullough issued an opinion that explained her ruling to block the certification process, arguing that there is a reasonable constitutionality argument, the certification process had not been completed, and that the certification announcement was only for the President / Vice President race and not for the other races on the ballots.

The Pennsylvania Supreme Court ruled on November 28 to unanimously overturn the Commonwealth Court's order to block the certification of election results in Pennsylvania. The Pennsylvania Supreme Court also dismissed with prejudice the requests of the Republicans to either invalidate all 2.5 million mail-in ballots in Pennsylvania, or to invalidate all 6.9 million ballots in the state and have the state's Republican-controlled Legislature choose the presidential electors for the state. The rationale for the decision was that the Republicans were challenging the law too late; they had been able to challenge the law since it came into force in October 2019, but only filed the lawsuit when the results of the November 2020 election were "becoming seemingly apparent". Hence, the Republicans had failed to act with "due diligence" in their handling of the case.

Kelly appealed to the US Supreme Court, and on December 3, 2020, Justice Samuel Alito set a deadline of December 9, one day after the safe-harbor date for Pennsylvania officials to respond to the request to throw out the state's mail-in voting results, or possibly even the entire election. But, the deadline was later changed to 9 am, December 8, so within the safe-harbor deadline. In complying with the change, the Commonwealth's attorneys stated:

"Petitioners [Kelly and others] ask this Court to undertake one of the most dramatic, disruptive invocations of judicial power in the history of the Republic. No court has ever issued an order nullifying a governor's certification of presidential election results. And for good reason: "Once the door is opened to judicial invalidation of presidential election results, it will be awfully hard to close that door again. . . . The loss of public trust in our constitutional order resulting from the exercise of this kind of judicial power would be incalculable."

On December 8, 2020, the Supreme Court rejected the request in a one-sentence, unsigned order; by the time of the high court's decision, the Pennsylvania election results had been certified in Biden's favor.

== Pirkle v. Wolf ==
On November 10, 2020, four voters sued to block votes from being counted in Philadelphia, Montgomery, Delaware and Allegheny counties. The plaintiffs claimed the state violated the Equal Protection Clause by allowing counties to have varying practices for mail-in ballots. Porter Wright, the law firm that represented the Trump campaign, asked to withdraw. On November 16, the plaintiffs voluntarily dismissed the suit. The claims made by plaintiffs in this lawsuit are similar to Brooks v. Mahoney and Bally v. Whitmer; these lawsuits were all filed by conservative lawyer James Bopp. The plaintiffs also cited Trump v. Boockvar.

== Ziccarelli v. Allegheny Cty. Bd. of Elections ==
=== November 12 lawsuit ===
On November 12, 2020, Nicole Ziccarelli, a Republican state Senate candidate, sued the Allegheny County Board of Elections in state court. The plaintiff claimed that the board improperly counted 2,349 mail-in ballots that were not dated by the voter, and sought to exclude these votes from being counted. On November 18, 2020, the state's Court of Common Pleas denied the plaintiffs request, ordering the votes to be counted. Ziccarelli appealed the decision on November 19; the following day, the state's Commonwealth Court ruled that the election code requires the voter to date their ballot, and the 2,349 ballots in question should not be counted.

The Supreme Court of Pennsylvania consolidated this case with In re: Canvass of Absentee and Mail-In Ballots of November 3, 2020, Gen. Election, and on November 23, affirmed the decision of the decision of the Allegheny County Board of Elections to count the 2,349 ballots at issue.

=== November 16 lawsuit ===
On November 16, 2020, Nicole Ziccarelli, a Republican state Senate candidate, filed a second lawsuit in state court against the Allegheny County Board of Elections. Ziccarelli challenged the decision of the board to count 270 provisional ballots that lacked one of two signatures. The Court of Common Pleas ruled that the ballots should be counted. Ziccarelli appealed; the Commonwealth Court reversed the lower court's decision, ruling that the statute at issue requires both signatures and the ballots should not be counted. On November 23, the Pennsylvania Supreme Court denied the board's petition for appeal.
