= Post-election lawsuits related to the 2020 U.S. presidential election =

After the 2020 United States presidential election, the campaign for incumbent President Donald Trump and others filed 62 lawsuits contesting election processes, vote counting, and the vote certification process in 9 states (including Arizona, Georgia, Michigan, Nevada, Pennsylvania, and Wisconsin) and the District of Columbia.

Nearly all the suits were dismissed or dropped for lack of evidence or lack of standing, including 30 lawsuits that were dismissed by the judge after a hearing on the merits. Among the judges who dismissed the lawsuits were some appointed by Trump himself. Judges, lawyers, and other observers described the suits as "frivolous" and "without merit". In one instance, the Trump campaign and other groups seeking his reelection collectively lost multiple cases in six states on a single day. Only one ruling was initially in Trump's favor: the timing within which first-time Pennsylvania voters must provide proper identification if they wanted to "cure" their ballots. This ruling affected very few votes, and it was later overturned by the Pennsylvania Supreme Court.

Trump, his attorneys, and his supporters falsely asserted widespread election fraud in public statements, but made few such assertions in court. Every state except Wisconsin met the December 8 statutory "safe harbor" deadline to resolve disputes and certify voting results. The Trump legal team had said it would not consider this election certification deadline as the expiration date for its litigation of the election results. Three days after it was filed by Texas attorney general Ken Paxton, the U.S. Supreme Court on December 11 declined to hear a case supported by Trump and his Republican allies asking for electoral votes in four states to be rejected.

One suit, Michigan Welfare Rights Org. et al. v. Donald J. Trump et al., was brought by black voter groups in Michigan against Trump and his 2020 presidential campaign. Dominion Voting Systems brought defamation lawsuits against former Trump campaign lawyers Sidney Powell and Rudy Giuliani, each for $1.3 billion. Smartmatic brought a defamation lawsuit against Fox Corporation and its anchors Lou Dobbs, Maria Bartiromo, and Jeanine Pirro as well as Giuliani and Powell for $2.7 billion. In the aftermath of the January 6, 2021, attack on the Capitol, several civil suits were filed against Trump, sometimes in combination with other defendants. The plaintiffs include members of Congress, United States Capitol Police officers, and District of Columbia Metropolitan Police officers.

Two criminal cases were also filed, The State of Georgia v. Donald J. Trump, et al., a racketeering case against Trump and 18 other defendants, and United States v. Donald J. Trump, an election obstruction case in the District of Columbia. Both cases were dropped after Trump's election victory in November 2024, because of the impossibility of charging and trying a sitting president.

== Background ==
Both before and after the election, the campaign for incumbent president Donald Trump filed a number of lawsuits contesting election processes, vote counting, and the vote certification process in multiple states, including Arizona, Georgia, Michigan, Nevada, Pennsylvania, Texas, and Wisconsin. Many cases were quickly dismissed, and lawyers and other observers noted that the lawsuits are not likely to have an effect on the outcome of the election. Trump, his supporters, and his attorneys asserted widespread election fraud in public statements.

The Trump campaign suffered several setbacks on November 13, 2020. The Department of Homeland Security released a statement saying that the election was the "most secure in American history" and that there was no evidence any voting systems malfunctioned. Sixteen federal prosecutors assigned to monitor the election sent a letter to Attorney General William Barr saying there was no evidence of widespread irregularities. A law firm hired by the campaign in Pennsylvania quit amidst concerns they were being used to undermine the electoral process. The campaign dropped its "Sharpiegate" lawsuit in Arizona. A judge in Wayne County, Michigan, refused to halt the vote count or certification of the winner. In Pennsylvania, judges refused to block 8,927 mail-in votes in Montgomery and Philadelphia counties.

Four lawsuits orchestrated by conservative lawyer James Bopp in Georgia, Wisconsin, Michigan, and Pennsylvania were dropped on November 16 after a federal appellate court said voters could not bring some constitutional claims. Sidney Powell was dropped as a lawyer for the Trump campaign on November 22, and was operating independently on November 23.

By November 27, 2020, more than thirty of the legal challenges filed since Election Day had failed; by December 14, 2020, over fifty lawsuits had been dismissed.

Federal judges in Georgia and Michigan rejected last-ditch efforts by pro-Trump lawyer Sidney Powell to overturn the election results on December 7, 2020. United States District Court for the Eastern District of Michigan Judge Linda Parker wrote, "[T]his lawsuit seems to be less about achieving the relief Plaintiffs seek—as much of that relief is beyond the power of this Court—and more about the impact of their allegations on People's faith in the democratic process and their trust in our government." In the United States District Court for the Northern District of Georgia, Judge Timothy Batten wrote, "They want this court to substitute its judgment for two-and-a-half million voters who voted for Joe Biden... And this I am unwilling to do."

Judges who were nominated by Trump also dismissed the claims and reliefs made by the Trump campaign in the courtrooms.

Voting machine companies Dominion Voting Systems and Smartmatic threatened legal action, claiming that they were defamed by lawyers for Trump and right-wing media companies Fox, Newsmax, and OAN, who propounded conspiracy theories about the election technology companies. On December 18, 2020, lawyers for the Trump campaign told employees to preserve all documents related to Sidney Powell and the Dominion Voting Systems in relation to the suits. Dominion sued Fox News for $1.6 billion, and in February 2023 released subpoenaed internal Fox News communications that showed several prominent network hosts and senior executives—including chairman Rupert Murdoch and CEO Suzanne Scott—discussing their knowledge that the election fraud allegations they were reporting were false. The communications showed the network was concerned that not reporting the falsehoods would alienate viewers and cause them to switch to rival conservative networks, impacting corporate profitability. In April 2023, Dominion settled with Fox News for $787.5 million, but a related $2.7 billion lawsuit by Smartmatic, another electronic voting systems, remains unresolved.

== Legal analysis and reactions ==
Loyola Law School professor Justin Levitt said "[t]here's literally nothing that I've seen yet with the meaningful potential to affect the final result". Ohio State University election law professor Ned Foley noted "[y]ou have to have a legal claim, and you have to have evidence to back it up. And that's just not there." University of Kentucky law professor Joshua Douglas said the lawsuits "all seem to have no merit whatsoever". Bradley P. Moss, an attorney specializing in national security, wrote that the suits "continue to defy reason and logic, and are purely theater ... It's all a farce". University of California, Irvine election law professor Rick Hasen said there is "no evidence of fraud so far that could conceivably affect the election results". Barry Richard, who helped to oversee the Republican-led Florida recount effort during the 2000 election, called the lawsuits "entirely without merit" and said they "will not be successful"; Gerry McDonough, an attorney who worked for the Gore campaign, said Trump "has no chance of overturning the result—it's just impossible". The Cybersecurity and Infrastructure Security Agency issued a statement calling the 2020 election "the most secure in American history" and noting "[t]here is no evidence that any voting system deleted or lost votes, changed votes, or was in any way compromised".

Jones Day, one of many law firms working for the Trump campaign and one that specifically handled Pennsylvania Democratic Party v. Boockvar, faced internal criticism for its "shortsighted" efforts on litigation that "erode[s] public confidence in the election results".

== Summary of post-election lawsuits ==
The Trump campaign filed the most post-election lawsuits related to the 2020 United States presidential election in the swing states of Arizona, Georgia, Michigan, Nevada, Pennsylvania, and Wisconsin. It was a strategic decision to file lawsuits in these states that were too close to call during the night of election day and remained uncalled for a few days.

=== Counts ===
Tally showing the number of lawsuits, sorted by state, that were dropped by plaintiff before a ruling, ruled against the plaintiff or dismissed by the court: this applying to all of the lawsuits filed by Trump and his supporters. The cases indicated to be ongoing refer to Michigan Welfare Rights Org. et al. v. Donald J. Trump et al.; several cases filed against Trump and other defendants in the aftermath of the January 6, 2021, attack on the Capitol, variously brought by members of Congress, United States Capitol Police officers, and District of Columbia Metropolitan Police officers; and two criminal cases, The State of Georgia v. Donald J. Trump, et al., a racketeering case against Trump and 18 other defendants, and United States v. Donald J. Trump, an election obstruction case. Of those cases, all but Georgia v. Trump were filed in the U.S. District Court for the District of Columbia. The one verdict in Pennsylvania ruled initially in Trump's favor, was after appeal, reversed by the Pennsylvania Supreme Court against the decision of the Commonwealth Court affirming the decision of the state's Court of Common Pleas reinstating the decision of the Allegheny County Board of Elections to count 2,349 ballots. Thus making the total ruled in favor for the Trump campaign in Pennsylvania 0 and total ruled against 2.

Total count of post-election lawsuits
State	Dropped	Dismissed	Trial ongoing	Ruled (against)	Ruled (for)	Total
Arizona	3	4	0	0	0	7
Georgia	3	4	1	0	0	8
Michigan	2	4	0	1	0	7
Nevada	2	5	0	0	0	7
New Mexico	1	0	0	0	0	1
Pennsylvania	1	9	0	2	0	12
Wisconsin	1	5	0	1	1	8
Others	1	2	6	1	0	10
Totals	14	33	7	5	1	60

=== Case summaries ===
Unresolved post-election lawsuits related to the 2020 United States presidential election
State	First filing date	Case	Court	Docket no(s).	Outcome	Comments	References
District of Columbia	February 16, 2021	Barbara J. Lee v. Donald J. Trump, Rudolph W. Giuliani, Proud Boys International LLC, Oath Keepers	U.S. District Court for the District of Columbia	1:21-cv-00400	Ongoing	Bennie Thompson, Barbara Lee, and others charged the defendants with violating the Ku Klux Klan Act of 1871 by obstructing the work of Congress in certifying the Electoral College vote results	
District of Columbia	March 5, 2021	Eric Swalwell v. Donald J. Trump, Donald J. Trump Jr., Mo Brooks, Rudolph Giuliani	U.S. District Court for the District of Columbia	1:21-cv-00586	Ongoing	Swalwell accused the defendants of violating civil rights laws, negligence, intentional infliction of emotional distress, and aiding and abetting assault	
District of Columbia	March 30, 2021	James Blassingame and Sidney Hemby v. Donald J. Trump	U.S. District Court for the District of Columbia	1:21-cv-00858	Ongoing	Two U.S. Capitol Police officers alleged that Trump was responsible for physical and emotional injuries they suffered during the January 6 attack, later amended to add violation of the Ku Klux Klan Act and conspiracy to interfere with civil rights	
District of Columbia	August 26, 2021	Conrad Smith et al. v. Donald J. Trump et al.	U.S. District Court for the District of Columbia	1:21-cv-02265	Ongoing	Several U.S. Capitol Police officers allege that Trump and his co-defendants conspired to violate the Ku Klux Klan Act and incited violence against the officers	

Resolved post-election lawsuits related to the 2020 United States presidential election outside of the swing states
State	First filing date	Case	Court	Docket no(s).	Outcome	Comments	References
Federal	December 7, 2020	Texas v. Pennsylvania et al.	US Supreme Court (original jurisdiction)	22O155	Denied	Lawsuit filed by Texas attorney general against Georgia, Pennsylvania, Wisconsin, and Michigan. Denied due to lack of standing.	
District of Columbia	November 20, 2020	Wisconsin Voters Alliance et al. v. Pence et al.	U.S. District Court for the District of Columbia	1:20-cv-03791	Appeal Dropped	A lawsuit challenging the election results of Pennsylvania, Michigan, Wisconsin, Georgia and Arizona. Plaintiffs requested a preliminary injunction to keep defendants, including Vice President Pence and the two legislative bodies of Congress, from certifying the presidential and vice presidential electors presented by the aforementioned states. Motion for preliminary injunction denied; court to consider arguments regarding disciplinary actions against plaintiffs. Voluntarily dismissed.	
District of Columbia	November 20, 2020	Michigan Welfare Rights Org. et al. v. Donald J. Trump et al.	U.S. District Court for the District of Columbia	1:20-cv-03388	Voluntarily dismissed	Black voters in the Detroit area have accused the Trump campaign of attempting to disenfranchise them.	
District of Columbia	August 1, 2023	United States v. Donald J. Trump	U.S. District Court for the District of Columbia	1:23-cr-00257	Dismissed	The Department of Justice accused Trump of a conspiracy to defraud the United States, conspiracy against rights, obstructing an official proceeding, and conspiring to do so. Dismissed upon Trump's re-election, citing the DOJ's policy of not prosecuting sitting Presidents.	
Minnesota	November 24, 2020	Tyler Kistner et al. v. Steve Simon, et al.	Minnesota Supreme Court	A20-1486	Ruled	Sought a temporary restraining order to delay the canvassing board's vote, alleging a variety of problems with the election. On December 4, 2020, the Minnesota Supreme Court held that the doctrine of laches applied to petitioners' claims against the secretary of state and that they had adequate time to bring suit prior to the election but failed to do so. In regards to observer access to post-election review, Minnesota law requires charges be served against county election officials which the petitioners did not do. Dispositive Ruling in Favor of the Defense	
Texas	December 27, 2020	Gohmert et al. v. Pence	United States District Court for the Eastern District of Texas	6:20-cv-00660	Dismissal Affirmed	Seeks an expedited declaratory judgment finding that Section 15 of the Electoral Count Act, 3 U.S.C. §§ 5 and 15 are unconstitutional because these provisions violate the Electors Clause and the Twelfth Amendment of the U.S. Constitution. Plaintiffs also request emergency injunctive relief required to effectuate the requested declaratory judgment. Dismissed due to lack of standing and jurisdiction. Plaintiffs appealed to the 5th Circuit, where the dismissal was quickly affirmed.	Works related to Gohmert v. Pence at Wikisource; Works related to Gohmert v. Pence (Fifth Circuit Court of Appeals) at Wikisource
Georgia	August 13, 2023	The State of Georgia v. Donald J. Trump et al.	Fulton County Superior Court	23SC188947 (indictment)	Dismissed	The State of Georgia accused the 19 defendants of violating Georgia's Racketeer Influenced and Corrupt Organizations (RICO) statute, and individual defendants also face varying other charges. Dismissed due to Trump's re-election, and the difficulty of severing the other conspiracy charges from his case.	

== United States Supreme Court ==
=== Texas v. Pennsylvania et al. ===
On December 8, 2020, Texas Attorney General Ken Paxton sued the states of Georgia, Michigan, Pennsylvania, and Wisconsin in order to invalidate the results of the presidential election in those states; the lawsuit was filed with the U.S. Supreme Court as it has original jurisdiction over disputes between states. Texas alleged that the four states used the COVID-19 pandemic as a pretext to unconstitutionally change voting laws and increase the number of mail-in ballots.

The attorneys general of Georgia, Pennsylvania, and Wisconsin responded critically to the lawsuit, while Trump and seventeen Republican state attorneys general filed motions to support the case. After the office of Georgia's Attorney General Chris Carr described the lawsuit as "constitutionally, legally and factually wrong", Trump had a telephone conversation with Carr, in which he warned Carr not to rally other Republican state officials in opposition to the lawsuit.

On December 10, over 100 House Republicans signed an amicus brief in support of Texas, including Minority Whip Steve Scalise and the ranking member on the Judiciary Committee, Jim Jordan. That same day, the attorneys general of Georgia, Michigan, Pennsylvania, and Wisconsin asked the Supreme Court to reject the lawsuit. In their briefs, the states challenged Texas' standing, and argued that the case did not belong in the high court; that Texas has no control over how other states conduct their elections; and that Texas waited too long to bring the suit.

Legal experts criticized the lawsuit and said it was unlikely to succeed. Rick Hasen, an election law expert at the University of California, Irvine, and Paul Smith, a professor at Georgetown University Law Center, questioned whether Texas has standing to bring the lawsuit and said the Supreme Court is unlikely to take up the case. University of Texas law professor Stephen Vladeck remarked, "It looks like we have a new leader in the 'craziest lawsuit filed to purportedly challenge the election' category."

On December 11, 2020, the Supreme Court denied the case:

The State of Texas's motion for leave to file a bill of complaint is denied for lack of standing under Article III of the Constitution. Texas has not demonstrated a judicially cognizable interest in the manner in which another State conducts its elections. All other pending motions are dismissed as moot.

Justice Alito, joined by Justice Thomas, contributed an additional statement, disagreeing with the denial:

In my view, we do not have discretion to deny the filing of a bill of complaint in a case that falls within our original jurisdiction. See Arizona v. California, 589 U. S. ___ (Feb. 24, 2020) (Thomas, J., dissenting). I would therefore grant the motion to file the bill of complaint but would not grant other relief, and I express no view on any other issue.

== Arizona ==
Several lawsuits were filed in the state of Arizona. All of these were either dismissed or dropped.

== District of Columbia ==
=== Michigan Welfare Rights Org. et al. v. Donald J. Trump et al. ===
Black voter groups in Michigan filed suit in the District of Columbia against the Trump campaign on November 20, 2020, alleging the campaign has disenfranchised Black voters through their attempts to challenge election results in Detroit, Philadelphia, Milwaukee, and Atlanta. In December 2022, a federal court ruled in favor of the NAACP and the Michigan Welfare Rights Organization in this case. The Court's ruling allowed the plaintiffs to proceed with filing a second amended complaint. The case was voluntarily dismissed in December 2024.

=== Wisconsin Voters Alliance et al. v. Pence et al. ===
A lawsuit challenging the election results of Pennsylvania, Michigan, Wisconsin, Georgia and Arizona was filed by the Amistad Project of the conservative Thomas More Society. Among the plaintiffs were the Wisconsin Voters Alliance. Shortly after the lawsuit was filed, Michigan lawmakers Matt Maddock and Daire Rendon attempted to withdraw as plaintiffs, because "what was eventually filed is very different than what was initially discussed", said Maddock.

The lawsuit named Vice President Mike Pence, Congress and the Electoral College among the defendants; however the Electoral College is not actually an entity, but a process.

The request for injunction was denied on January 4, 2021, on the basis of lack of jurisdiction, lack of standing, and because Plaintiffs "have established no likelihood of success on the merits" since the request was based on a fundamental misreading of the law. Judge James E. Boasberg also stated that "at the conclusion of this litigation, the Court will determine whether to issue an order to show cause why this matter should not be referred to its Committee on Grievances for potential discipline of Plaintiffs' counsel" due to their failure to duly notify or serve Defendants, despite reminders from the Court. The lawsuit was withdrawn on January 7, 2021.

=== Lee v. Trump et al., Swalwell v. Trump et al., and Blassingame et al. v. Trump ===
Judge Amit Mehta was assigned as the judge for all three suits, and he consolidated the oral arguments for them, holding arguments on January 10, 2022, to consider whether Trump and the other defendants were immune from liability. The defendants had requested immunity on the grounds of the First Amendment, and those who were elected officials also claimed immunity based on that status. On February 18, 2022, Mehta denied the motion to dismiss some of the claims, while granting the motion to dismiss other of the claims. Trump then appealed the cases to the District of Columbia Circuit Court of Appeals on July 27, 2022, claiming absolute immunity. The Court of Appeals ruled against him on December 1, 2023, allowing the civil suits to proceed.

=== United States of America v. Donald J. Trump ===
This was a federal criminal case regarding Donald Trump's alleged participation in attempts to overturn the 2020 U.S. presidential election, including his involvement in the January 6 Capitol attack. The case was dismissed after Trump's election to the presidency, citing the longstanding policy of not charging a sitting president.

== Georgia ==
Several civil lawsuits were filed in Georgia after the election. All of these were either dismissed or dropped.

On August 14, 2023, a Georgia grand jury indicted Trump and 18 other defendants in a criminal election racketeering case. This case is ongoing.

== Michigan ==
Several lawsuits were filed in Michigan after the election. All of these were either dismissed or dropped.

== Minnesota ==
=== Kistner v. Simon ===
On November 24, 2020, a petition was filed in the Minnesota Supreme Court by 25 candidates from numerous races within Minnesota as well as a handful of voters against Minnesota Secretary of State Steve Simon and the state's canvassing board. The suit alleged various election problems and sought a temporary restraining order delaying certification of election results, which had already been certified the previous day.

On December 4, 2020, the Minnesota Supreme Court dismissed all 3 claims filed by the petitioners, and thereby ordered that the whole petitioned filed on November 24, 2020, be dismissed.

The court's decision to dismiss was based partly on the grounds that petitioners should have filed suit earlier. "Given the undisputed public record regarding the suspension of the witness requirement for absentee and mail ballots, petitioners had a duty to act well before November 3, 2020," the ruling states. It goes on to say that "asserting these claims 2 months after voting started, 3 weeks after voting ended, and less than 24 hours before the State Canvassing Board met to certify the election results is unreasonable."

== Nevada ==
Seven lawsuits were filed in Nevada after November 3, 2020. All of these were either dismissed or dropped.

== New Mexico ==
=== Donald J. Trump for President v. Oliver et al. ===
On December 14, 2020, the same day that New Mexico electors cast their electoral college votes, the Trump campaign filed a lawsuit in federal court against New Mexico Secretary of State, Maggie Toulouse Oliver, the electors of New Mexico and the State Canvassing Board. The lawsuit concerns the use of drop boxes in the 2020 elections. The federal lawsuit claims that New Mexico Secretary of State Maggie Toulouse Oliver violated the state election code by permitting voters to deposit completed absentee ballots in drop boxes at voting locations rather than handing them to the location's presiding judge in person. The complaint asks the court to order a delay in certifying New Mexico's electoral vote, which had already occurred, and mandate a statewide canvass of New Mexico's absentee ballots, including investigations into every voting location where a drop box was implemented.

On January 11, 2021, five days after Congress certified the results for Joe Biden, the campaign dropped the lawsuit. Trump attorney Mark Caruso cited "events that have transpired since the inception of this lawsuit" in a three-page motion as the reason for dropping the lawsuit. Although, the motion still allows for revisiting these concerns in the future.

== Pennsylvania ==
Several lawsuits were filed in the Commonwealth of Pennsylvania. Four had still been pending in federal jurisdiction at the United States Supreme Court. Of these, two lawsuits were filed after Election Day, and the other two were filed before the election. The lawsuits filed after Election day were Bognet et al. v. Boockvar et al. and Donald J. Trump for President v. Boockvar et al.. Donald J. Trump for President v. Boockvar et al. was dismissed without comment by the Supreme Court on February 22, 2021. On April 19, 2021, more than five months after the November 3, 2020, election, the Supreme Court declined to hear the outstanding case brought by former Republican congressional candidate Jim Bognet, dismissing it without comment.

In August 2024, a judge ruled that Washington County, Pennsylvania, violated state law by failing to notify voters when their mail-in ballots were rejected during the April primary election. The ruling ordered the county to notify voters of future rejections and allow provisional voting.

=== Bognet et al. v. Boockvar et al. ===
Asked a federal court to overturn the Pennsylvania Supreme Court's decision allowing the receipt of ballots after Election Day. Dismissed by the Pennsylvania district court, appealed to 3rd Circuit Court of Appeals; dismissed, and appealed to the Supreme Court where it was dismissed without comment on February 22, 2021.

=== Donald J. Trump for President v. Boockvar et al. ===
Donald J. Trump for President v. Boockvar et al. is a lawsuit filed in the United States Supreme Court on December 20, 2020. The suit asks the Court to evaluate the constitutionality of three Pennsylvania Supreme Court decisions: In re November 3, 2020, Gen. Election, In re Canvassing Observation, and In re Canvass of Absentee & Mail-In Ballots of November 3, 2020, Gen. Election. The Trump campaign also submitted a request to expedite proceedings, but the Court ignored this and instead set the deadline for reply briefs from the respondents for January 22, 2021, two days after Biden's inauguration. It was dismissed without comment by the Supreme Court on February 22, 2021.

== Texas ==
=== Gohmert et al. v. Pence ===
On December 27, 2020, Texas Congressman Louie Gohmert, Arizona Republican Party Chair Kelli Ward, and other Republican party members filed a complaint in the United States District Court for the Eastern District of Texas. Vice President Mike Pence was named as defendant of the suit. The complaint argued that certain provisions of the Electoral Count Act of 1887 are unconstitutional under the Electors Clause and the Twelfth Amendment of the United States Constitution. The lawsuit's intended outcome was for Pence to be empowered to select self-styled "alternate" slates of electors from specific swing states on January 6, 2021, such that Trump received those states' electoral votes and wins the election; the Electoral Count Act does not give the Vice President any such "sole discretionary" power over electoral votes, and none of the self-styled "alternate" slates of electors from the swing states have been certified by their respective states' legal processes.

Judge Jeremy Kernodle, U.S. District Court of the Eastern District of Texas, called for Vice President Pence to issue a response to the lawsuit by December 31, 2020, at 5 p.m. and for Gohmert to issue a reply to Pence by January 1, 2021, at 9 a.m. Pence replied on December 31 that the suit should be dismissed because he is not the appropriate party to address the matter. The Justice Department also requested the suit be dismissed. On January 1, 2021, Gohmert and other Republicans filed a new brief contending that Pence is the proper defendant in the case, and that the United States or House or Senate parliamentarians could be added as defendants by the congressman for clarification. Gohmert stated that he needs a ruling by January 4, 2021. Nonetheless, the Justice Department supported Pence and noted that Congress, not Pence, is more suitable to be sued. In addition, congressional lawyers supported Pence's position as well.

The case was dismissed without prejudice on January 1, 2021, for lack of both standing and jurisdiction. Judge Kernodle ruled that Gohmert lacked standing due to precedent set by the Supreme Court in 1997: alleging an "institutional injury to the House of Representatives" does not grant Gohmert standing to sue "as an individual". Additionally, Kernodle ruled that the injury Gohmert was alleging "requires a series of hypothetical—but by no means certain—events" that were "far too uncertain to support standing". As for the other plaintiffs, Kernodle ruled that they lacked standing because the injury they alleged was "not fairly traceable" to the Vice President. Gohmert appealed the district court's ruling that day.

On January 2, a three-judge panel speedily and tersely rejected the appeal, "affirm[ing] the judgment" of the district court "essentially for the reasons stated" in Kernodle's order. The unanimous ruling was made by three Republican appointees: Andy Oldham (Trump) and Patrick Higginbotham and Jerry Edwin Smith (Reagan).

Gohmert then appealed to the Supreme Court, which on January 7 also tersely rejected his petition as "denied".

== Wisconsin ==
Several lawsuits were filed in Wisconsin after the election. A three-judge panel of the Seventh Circuit Court of Appeals unanimously rejected Trump's appeal of a lower court's ruling in Trump v. Wisconsin Elections Commission on December 24. The Court considered another case, Feehan et al. v. Wisconsin Elections Commission et al., though in December 2020 Sidney Powell filed an emergency petition with the United States Supreme Court seeking an extraordinary writ of mandamus for intervention in the case. The petition was denied without comment on March 1, 2021, ending the matter.

=== Mark Jefferson v. Dane County, Wisconsin ===
On December 14, 2020, a petition was filed in the Wisconsin Supreme Court by Mark Jefferson and the Republican Party of Wisconsin seeking a declaration that (1) Dane County lacks the authority to issue an interpretation of Wisconsin's election law allowing all electors in Dane County to obtain an absentee ballot without a photo identification and (2) Governor Tony Evers' Emergency Order #12 did not authorize all Wisconsin voters to obtain an absentee ballot without a photo identification. The Wisconsin Supreme Court ruled in favor of Mark Jefferson and the Republican Party of Wisconsin, stating that the Dane County government's interpretation of Wisconsin election laws was erroneous. "A county clerk may not 'declare' that any elector is indefinitely confined due to a pandemic," the court said. The court further stated that "...the presence of a communicable disease such as COVID-19, in and of itself, does not entitle all electors in Wisconsin to obtain an absentee ballot..." This ruling had no effect on the results of either Dane County or Wisconsin.

== Ethics sanctions ==
On June 25, 2021, a New York State appellate court suspended attorney Rudy Giuliani's New York law license. A few weeks later, a Washington D.C. court suspended his Washington D.C. law license. In July 2024, Giuliani was officially disbarred in New York State.

On July 12, 2021, U.S. District Judge Linda Parker of the United States District Court for the Eastern District of Michigan held a Zoom hearing and compelled the testimony of several lawyers that participated in post-election lawsuits, including Sidney Powell, L. Lin Wood, and others. The hearing is the first step in determining if lawyers that participated in post-election lawsuits should receive attorney misconduct sanctions or be referred to a regulatory body for disbarment proceedings, for violating the ethics of their profession. Judge Parker issued sanctions against the attorneys in August 2021, ordering them to pay the legal fees incurred by Michigan authorities and to take legal education classes. Parker also referred the attorneys to the states where they are licensed to practice law for possible disciplinary action. She wrote the attorneys had "scorned their oath, flouted the rules, and attempted to undermine the integrity of the judiciary along the way."

On August 3, 2021, Magistrate Judge for the District of Colorado N. Reid Neureiter sanctioned two lawyers, Gary D. Fielder and Ernest John Walker, for a "frivolous" election lawsuit that was filed "in bad faith", containing "highly disputed and inflammatory" allegations that the lawyers made no efforts to verify. In November 2021, Neureiter ordered the two attorneys to pay the groups they sued $187,000 to defray their legal costs, and to deter similar frivolous suits.

== In popular culture ==
Attorney Sidney Powell used the phrase "release the Kraken" to describe legal efforts to overturn the 2020 United States presidential election. It became a catchphrase for unfounded conspiracy theory.

== See also ==
- Pre-election lawsuits related to the 2020 U.S. presidential election
- Attempts to overturn the 2020 United States presidential election
- Donald Trump's false claims of a stolen election
- Dominion Voting Systems v. Fox News Network
- Trump fake electors plot
