= Procedural due process =

Legal doctrine

Procedural due process is a legal doctrine in the United States that requires government officials to follow fair procedures before depriving a person of life, liberty, or property. When the government seeks to deprive a person of one of those interests, procedural due process requires at least for the government to afford the person notice, an opportunity to be heard, and a decision made by a neutral decisionmaker. Procedural due process is required by the Due Process Clauses of the Fifth Amendment (for federal matters) and Fourteenth Amendment (for matters at the state level) to the United States Constitution.

The article "Some Kind of Hearing" written by Judge Henry Friendly created a list of basic due process rights "that remains highly influential, as to both content and relative priority." The rights, which apply equally to civil due process and criminal due process, are the following:

1. An unbiased tribunal.
2. Notice of the proposed action and the grounds asserted for it.
3. The opportunity to present reasons for the proposed action not to be taken.
4. The right to present evidence, including the right to call witnesses.
5. The right to know the opposing evidence.
6. The right to cross-examine adverse witnesses.
7. A decision based only on the evidence presented.
8. Opportunity to be represented by counsel.
9. A requirement that the tribunal prepare a record of the evidence presented.
10. A requirement that the tribunal prepare written findings of fact and the reasons for its decision.

Not all the above rights are guaranteed in every instance when the government seeks to deprive a person of life, liberty, or property. At minimum, a person is due only notice, an opportunity to be heard, and a decision by a neutral decisionmaker. Courts use various tests to determine whether a person should also be guaranteed any of the other above procedural rights.

== Sources ==
- Glicksman, Robert L.; Levy, Richard E. (2010). Administrative Law: Agency Action in Legal Context. Foundation Press/Thomson Reuters. ISBN 978-1-59941-610-6.
