= Galicia v. Trump =

Lawsuit involving alleged assault on protestors

Galicia v. Trump is a case put before the New York Supreme Court in which plaintiffs alleged that they were assaulted in September 2015 by Donald Trump's security team (which included Keith Schiller) at Trump Tower while peacefully protesting Trump's statements related to Black Lives Matter and Mexican immigrants.

State Supreme Court Justice Doris Gonzalez has been handling the case. In September 2019, she ordered President Trump to "appear for a videotaped deposition" under oath for the civil suit. She again ordered Trump to appear at a video deposition on October 18, 2021. Trump testified that he had been unaware of the incident while it unfolded and did not hear about it until a later date. In April 2022, part of the deposition transcript was released, which included Trump discussing being deathly afraid of protestors throwing fruit at him. In May, former Trump fixer Michael Cohen testified that Trump knew about the protestors at Trump Tower and said, "Get rid of them!" Cohen also testified that Trump had instructed his security detail to look out for pies being lodged at him.

Trump also testified that he personally oversaw the compensation of his chief operating officer, Michael Calamari Sr., which became relevant to a New York criminal investigation of the Trump Organization for possible fraud. Trump's deposition in a related civil investigation by the New York Attorney General was expected to delay the trial for Galicia v. Trump.

In early November 2022, as a jury was being selected for Galicia v. Trump, it was announced that a settlement had been reached.

== See also ==
- List of lawsuits involving Donald Trump
