= Lee v. Trump =

Court case relating to January 6 Capitol attack

- Court: United States District Court for the District of Columbia
- Full case name: Barbara J. Lee, et al v. Donald J. Trump et al
- Citation: No. 1:21-cv-00400

Court membership
- Judge sitting: Amit Mehta

Lee v. Trump is an ongoing federal civil case filed in February 2021 on behalf of U. S. House of Representatives Bennie Thompson against current U.S. president Donald Trump. The lawsuit accused Trump and others conspired to incite the January 6 United States Capitol attack. In February 2022, District of Columbia U.S. District Court Judge Amit Mehta ruled that presidential immunity did not shield Trump from the lawsuit. In March 2022, Trump appealed Mehta's ruling to the U.S. District of Columbia Circuit Court of Appeals. In December 2023, the Court of Appeals upheld Mehta's ruling against Trump. Trump returned to the District Court, which denied key immunity defenses and allowed major claims against Donald Trump to proceed, finding that plaintiffs plausibly alleged he incited the January 6 attack and may have conspired with extremist groups.

== Background ==
On February 16, 2021, the National Association for the Advancement of Colored People (NAACP) filed a lawsuit on behalf of U. S. House of Representatives Bennie Thompson against former President Donald Trump, Rudolph Giuliani, the Proud Boys and the Oath Keepers. The lawsuit centered around the 1871 Ku Klux Klan Act, designed to protect members of Congress from violent conspiracies that interfere with their official Congressional duties. In an interview with The Guardian, NAACP President Derrick Johnson stated that the "former administration and Giuliani sought to disqualify our votes" and accused Trump of "operating under a white supremacist doctrine that was a derived [sic] from days of the Confederacy".

On April 7, 2021, ten more Representatives joined the suit as plaintiffs. They were Steve Cohen, Karen Bass, Bonnie Watson Coleman, Veronica Escobar, Hank Johnson, Marcy Kaptur, Barbara Lee, Jerry Nadler, Pramila Jayapal, and Maxine Waters. In July 2021, Thompson withdrew from the suit to avoid any conflict with chairing the House Select Committee investigating the attack, while the other plaintiffs, who were not on the Committee, decided to moved forward. In February 2024, the remaining plaintiffs asked to change the case name to Barbara J. Lee, et al v. Trump.

== Pre-Trial Rulings ==
Judge Mehta consolidated Lee v. Trump with two other suits before him—Swalwell v. Trump (brought by Representative Eric Swalwell) and Blassingame v. Trump (brought by two U.S. Capitol Police officers)—to consider whether Trump and the other defendants were immune from liability. The defendants had requested immunity on the grounds of the First Amendment, and those who were elected officials also claimed immunity based on that status. Mehta ruled in February 2022 that presidential immunity did not shield Trump from the lawsuits. Trump then appealed the consolidated cases to the District of Columbia Circuit Court of Appeals in March 2022, claiming absolute immunity.

In December 2023, the Court of Appeals (with judges Gregory G. Katsas, Judith W. Rogers, and Sri Srinivasan presiding) upheld Mehta's ruling that presidential immunity did not shield Trump from the lawsuits because the lawsuits alleged that Trump was acting "as an office-seeker not office-holder" due to his speech on January 6 being a campaign event, and as such, did not clearly fall within the "outer perimeter" standard established in Nixon v. Fitzgerald (1982).

On March 30th, 2026, Mehta ruled on a request from Trump for summary judgement and found that his speech on the Ellipse was not covered by the Supreme Court’s immunity ruling and allowed the case to move forward.

== See also ==
- Presidential eligibility of Donald Trump
- Federal prosecution of Donald Trump (election obstruction case)
- Trump v. Anderson (2024)
- Trump v. United States (2024)
- United States free speech exceptions
