= Pre-election lawsuits related to the 2020 U.S. presidential election =

Before Election Day of the 2020 United States presidential election, lawsuits related to the voting process were filed in various states. Many of these lawsuits were related to measures taken by state legislatures and election officials in response to the COVID-19 pandemic.

== Background ==
Prior to the 2020 United States presidential election, the COVID-19 pandemic caused many states to adjust their voting rules and processes. Litigation was initiated by Democrats, seeking measures to ease voting, and Republicans, seeking to block such measures. "[O]ver 230 election-related federal lawsuits were filed from January 1 to October 23, higher than any of the past three presidential election years during the same time period", according to a USA Today analysis. Issues related to mail-in and curbside voting, early voting, voter registration, photo ID and witness signature requirements, and voting rights for convicted felons.

Throughout 2020, the Supreme Court issued at least a dozen orders related to the 2020 primary and general elections. The court's conservative justices have objected to last-minute changes to elections that are ordered by federal judges, saying the power to administer elections lies solely with state legislatures; the court's liberal justices have favored the loosening of election rules. The deciding vote has often fallen to Chief Justice John Roberts, according to Jonathan Adler, a professor at the Case Western Reserve University School of Law. Under Roberts, the court has focused on keeping federal courts out of state elections, and has consistently treated election changes made by state judges or officials more leniently than those made by federal courts.

== Summary of pre-election lawsuits ==
=== Counts ===
	Dismissed	Decision appealed	Ongoing	Ruled
Count	8	3	3	7

=== Case summaries ===
Pre-election lawsuits related to the 2020 United States presidential election
State	First filing date	Case	Court	Docket no(s).	Outcome	Comments	References
Arizona	September 30, 2020	Mi Familia Vota v. Hobbs	U.S. Court of Appeals for the 9th Circuit	2:20-cv-01903-SPL (D. Ariz.); 20-16932; 20-17000 (9th Cir.)	Ruled	Two non-profit voter registration groups, the Arizona Coalition for Change and Mi Familia Vota, filed a motion asking the voter-registration deadline of October 5, 2020, be moved due to the COVID-19 pandemic; after opposing responses from Arizona secretary of state Katie Hobbs and the Republican National Committee, Judge Steven Logan extended the deadline to October 23. The same day, October 5, Hobbs and the RNC appealed to the 9th Circuit, which placed a stay on Logan's extended deadline effective October 15. On October 13, Judge Fletcher and Bybee ordered that those who registered after October 5 were not eligible to vote in the November election.	
Arizona	June 10, 2020	Arizona Democratic Party v. Hobbs	U.S. Court of Appeals for the 9th Circuit	20-16759; 20-16766 (9th Cir.) 2:20-cv-01143-DLR (D. Ariz.)	Dismissal appealed	Whether recent changes to Arizona's election procedures – which provide both absentee voters whose signatures on their mail-in ballots cannot be verified, and in-person voters who cannot provide proper identification at the polls, up to five days after Election Day to remedy their ballot identification issues – must also be extended to absentee voters who submit unsigned ballots.	
California	June 11, 2020	Gallagher v. Newsom	California Superior Court, County of Sutter	CVCS20-0912	Ruled	Challenging Executive Order N-67-20 issued by Governor Gavin Newsom on June 3, 2020. The court found Order N-67-20 to be unconstitutional and enjoining Newsom from "amend[ing], alter[ing], or chang[ing] existing statutory law or mak[ing] new statutory or legislative policy" via the California Emergency Services Act.	
Georgia	May 8, 2020	The New Georgia Project v. Raffensperger	U.S. District Court for the Northern District of Georgia	20-13360-D (11th Cir.) 1:20-CV-01986-ELR (N.D. Ga.)	Appealed by defendants	Whether Georgia's requirement that absentee ballots be received by 7 p.m. on Election Day poses an unconstitutional infringement on the right to vote in light of the coronavirus pandemic. Originally in favor of a 3-day extension to receive ballots, the decision was appealed. Republicans filed motion to stay the injunction that was granted on October 2 in the U.S. 11th Circuit Court of Appeals by Judges Britt Grant and Barbara Lagoa.	.
Michigan	June 2, 2020	Michigan Alliance for Retired Americans v. Benson	Michigan Court of Appeals	20-000108-MM (Mich. Ct. Cl.); 1:20-cv-00948 (W.D. Mich.); 354993 (Mich. App.)	Ruled	Michigan State Appeals court reversed lower state court ruling, finding the 8pm election deadline for receiving absentee ballots does NOT violate Const 1963, art 2, § 4 and that the court is bound by League of Women Voters of Mich v Secretary of State (League II), (issued July 14, 2020, Docket No. 353654). Defendants have requested withdrawal of similar complaint pending in federal court.	
Minnesota	September 22, 2020	Carson v. Simon	U.S. District Court for the District of Minnesota	0:20-cv-02030	Ongoing	Whether a measure by Minnesota elections officials extending the deadline for timely postmarked absentee ballots to be received and still counted until one week after Election Day violates the U.S. Constitution; and whether the challengers, two nominees to serve as Republican Party presidential electors in Minnesota, have legal standing to challenge the measure.	
Nevada	October 23, 2020	Kraus v. Cegavske	Nevada Supreme Court	82018	Rejected	Appealed to Supreme Court of Nevada; settlement filed.	
Nevada	August 7, 2020	Donald J. Trump for President v. Cegavske	Nevada District Court	2:20-cv-01445-JCM-VCF	Dismissed	Whether recent changes by the state legislature to Nevada's voting procedures including, among other things, the expansion of voting-by-mail and a requirement that officials count ballots received up to three days after Election Day, violate federal election law and the Fourteenth Amendment.	
New Jersey	August 18, 2020	Donald J. Trump for President v. Way	U.S. District Court for the District of New Jersey	3:20-cv-10753-MAS-ZNQ	Denied	Whether an executive order by the governor of New Jersey in light of the coronavirus pandemic that requires mail-in ballots to be sent to all registered voters in the state, and extends the deadline for submitting them, violates federal election law and the Constitution.	
North Carolina	August 10, 2020	Moore v. Circosta	U.S. Court of Appeals for the 4th Circuit	1:20-cv-00911-WO-JLW (M.D.N.C.); S:20-CV-507-D (E.D.N.C.); P20-513 (N.C. Ct. App.); 440P20 (N.C.); 20A72 (S. Ct.) 20–2118; 20-2119 (4th Cir.)	Denial appealed	Whether coronavirus-related changes implemented after the start of absentee voting by North Carolina elections officials to a number of absentee ballot procedures – extending the deadline to receive ballots, and modifying requirements for postmarking and third-party collection of them – violate the state legislature's power to regulate elections under the Constitution as well as the equal protection clause. M.D.N.C. stay denial of October 14 combined with Wise v. North Carolina State Board of Elections, 1:20-cv-00912. SCOTUS stay denial on October 28. U.S. Appeals 4th Cir briefing schedule deadlines through January 2021.	
Pennsylvania	July 10, 2020	Pennsylvania Democratic Party v. Boockvar	Supreme Court of Pennsylvania	133 MM 2020; 407-MD-2020	Ruled	Whether injunctive relief and declaratory relief be given to the voters of Pennsylvania in light of the COVID-19 pandemic. Remedies sought were Count 1: Concerning the use of drop boxes, Count 2: Allowing 3 additional days to receive mail in ballots, Count 3: On preemptively contacting voters to cure incomplete or incorrectly filled out ballots, Count 4: On allowing ballots without their secrecy envelope to not be invalidated, and Count 5: Declaring that the residency requirement for poll-watchers is constitutional. Counts 1, 2, and 5 granted; Counts 3 and 4 denied.	
Pennsylvania	September 28, 2020	Republican Party of Pennsylvania v. Boockvar	Supreme Court of the United States	No. 20-542 (SCOTUS )	Ongoing	A Supreme Court case to determine if the Supreme Court of Pennsylvania usurped the authority of the Pennsylvania General Assembly in Pennsylvania Democratic Party v. Boockvar. Not confirmed whether the court will rule on the issue. Justice Samuel Alito has ordered all such ballots to be kept and tabulated separately pending the outcome of this litigation. As of November 30, 2020, the case was vided with Scarnati v. Pennsylvania Democratic Party. See also Scarnati v. Pennsylvania Democratic Party (No. 20-574)	
Pennsylvania	October 27, 2020	Scarnati v. Pennsylvania Democratic Party	Supreme Court of the United States	No. 20-574 (SCOTUS )	Ongoing	Another Supreme Court case to determine if the Supreme Court of Pennsylvania usurped the authority of the Pennsylvania General Assembly in Pennsylvania Democratic Party v. Boockvar. As of November 30, 2020, the case was vided with Republican Party of Pennsylvania v. Boockvar. See also Republican Party of Pennsylvania v. Boockvar (No. 20-542).	
Pennsylvania	July 1, 2020	Donald J. Trump for President v. Boockvar	U.S. District Court for the Western District of Pennsylvania	2:20-cv-00966-NR	Dismissed	Whether a number of Pennsylvania elections accommodations in light of the coronavirus pandemic – providing additional drop-off sites and alleviating signature-matching requirements for absentee ballots, as well as lifting a restriction on employing out-of-county poll workers – violate state election law and the U.S. Constitution. Some of the issues initially raised in this case were determined by Pennsylvania Democratic Party v. Boockvar thus significantly narrowing the focus of this case. Dismissed on a lack of standing and a lack of merit. Lack of standing due to lack of evidence regarding a "certain impending" harm of "vote dilution". Lack of merit due to federal courts "sphere does not extend to second-guessing and interfering with a State’s reasonable, nondiscriminatory election rules."	
Tennessee	May 1, 2020	Memphis A. Philip Randolph Institute v. Hargett	U.S. District Court for the Middle District of Tennessee; U.S. Court of Appeals for the 6th Circuit	3:20-cv-00374 (M.D. Tenn.); 20-6046 (6th Cir.)	Dismissed	Whether Tennessee may enforce a number of vote-by-mail regulations for the November 2020 election, including preventing first-time voters from applying for an absentee ballot, barring third-party distribution of absentee ballot applications, and a process for verifying signatures on mail-in ballots.	
Texas	October 27, 2020	Hotze v. Hollins	U.S. Court of Appeals for the 5th Circuit	4:20-cv-03709	Dismissed	A federal court lawsuit to have approximately 127,000 ballots thrown out due to the fact that they were done at drive-through stations. Republicans needed to prove an "evil motive".	
Texas	October 30, 2020	In re Steven Hotze, M.D., Harris Cnty. Republican Party, Hon. Keith Nielsen, and Sharon Hemphill	Texas Supreme Court	20-0819	Dismissed		
Texas	October 30, 2020	In re Steven Hotze, M.D., Wendell Champion, Hon. Steven Toth, and Sharon Hemphill	Texas Supreme Court	20-0863	Dismissed		
Texas	October 1, 2020	Texas League of United Latin American Citizens v. Abbott	U.S. Court of Appeals for the 5th Circuit	1:20-CV-1006-RP; 1:20-CV-1015-RP	Ruled	Whether Texas' limitation of one absentee ballot drop-off site per county violates the Constitution and the Voting Rights Act. The federal appeals court allowed the limitation to remain in place throughout the remainder of the 2020 election season.	
Texas	April 7, 2020	Texas Democratic Party v. Abbott	U.S. District Court for the Western District of Texas	5:20-cv-00438	Ruled	Whether a Texas law requiring voters under the age of 65 to provide an excuse in order to vote by mail violates the 26th Amendment or the equal protection clause of the 14th Amendment. The U.S. Court of Appeals ruled that the Texas law does not violate the 26th Amendment, and sent case back to lower court for more proceedings. The Texas Supreme Court later upheld the age requirement in a related case, State of Texas v. Hollins.	
Washington	August 18, 2020	Washington v. Trump	U.S. District Court for the Eastern District of Washington	1:20-CV-03127-SAB	Ruled	Whether recent changes announced to the United States Postal Service violate federal administrative rulemaking requirements and infringe upon the rights of states to regulate elections under the Constitution.	

== Arizona ==
=== Arizona Democratic Party v. Hobbs ===
On June 10, 2020, the Arizona Democratic Party and the Democratic National Committee filed a lawsuit against Arizona Secretary of State Katie Hobbs in federal court, challenging a state law that requires those who vote by mail to correct missing signatures by election day. On September 10, U.S. District Judge Douglas Rayes ruled for the Arizona Democratic Party. On October 6, the U.S. Court of Appeals for the 9th Circuit overruled Rayes, finding that the election day deadline to correct a missing signature imposes a minimal burden on voters.

=== Mi Familia Vota v. Hobbs ===
On September 30, two non-profit groups asked U.S. district court judge Steven Logan to extend the voter registration deadline from October 5, the date set by Arizona state law, to October 23. The groups argued that in light of COVID-19 pandemic, the October 5 deadline is a burden on voters. Judge Logan granted the request, finding that "[b]allot access is an extremely important right, and it has been restricted during this unprecedented time." The Republican National Committee joined the suit and appealed Logan's ruling to the U.S. Court of Appeals for the 9th Circuit, which permitted the extension only to October 15, and validated registrations lodged before that date.

== California ==
=== Gallagher v. Newsom ===
Two California State Assembly members, James Gallagher (R-Yuba City) and Kevin Kiley (R-Rocklin), sued Gavin Newsom, the Governor of California, claiming that Newsom did not have the authority to issue an executive order (N-67-20, issued June 3, 2020) to mandate all Californians receive mail-in ballots for the November 3 general election by invoking the California Emergency Services Act (CESA). On November 14, 2020, Sutter County Judge Sarah H. Heckman finalized a ruling saying Governor Newsom overstepped his authority in doing so. The ruling also put a permanent injunction on Newsom, enjoining him from "amend[ing], alter[ing], or chang[ing] existing statutory law or mak[ing] new statutory or legislative policy" via CESA. However, since the legislature had overwhelmingly passed a similar law (AB 860; Sen. 31–7, Ass. 68–5, signed June 18) after the executive order, the ruling had no impact on the outcome of the election. The main focus was to ensure that the Governor of California cannot use executive power under other similar circumstances by invoking the California Emergency Services Act.

== Michigan ==
=== Michigan All. for Retired Americans v. Benson ===
On June 2, 2020, the Michigan Alliance for Retired Americans filed suit in Michigan's court of claims against state officials, including Secretary of State Jocelyn Benson, challenging the requirement for mail-in ballots to be received by election day in order to be counted. Judge Cynthia Stephens granted the request, ordering that county clerks must count ballots postmarked by election day and received up to 14 days after election day. The state appeals court overruled Stephens, writing that the lower court "abused its discretion by ordering the extension."

== Minnesota ==
=== Carson v. Simon ===
On September 22, 2020, two Republican presidential elector nominees, James Carson and Eric Lucero, filed a lawsuit in federal court, arguing that a consent decree entered into by Minnesota Secretary of State Steve Simon and the Alliance for Retired Americans Educational Fund is unconstitutional. While Minnesota state law requires mail-in ballots to be received by Election Day in order to be counted, the consent decree extended the deadline for mail-in ballots by one week. The district court denied Carson and Lucero's request, concluding the plaintiffs lacked standing. On October 24, the U.S. Court of Appeals for the 8th Circuit reversed the district court's ruling, finding that “only the Minnesota Legislature, and not the Secretary" could establish rules for conducting elections in the state. The court ordered ballots arriving after 8p.m. on Election Day to be segregated pending possible further proceedings. Secretary of State Simon said votes received after 8p.m. will still be counted unless a court rules otherwise.

== Nevada ==
One lawsuit was filed in Nevada before and seven were filed after November 3, 2020.

=== Kraus v. Cegavske ===
On October 23, the Nevada Republican Party and the Trump campaign joined a private citizen in filing a lawsuit in the First Judicial District Court of Nevada against Secretary of State Barbara Cegavske and Clark County registrar of voters Joe Gloria, citing alleged problems with the signature verification process. Judge James Wilson rejected the lawsuit, finding the plaintiffs lacked standing. Plaintiffs appealed to the Supreme Court of Nevada. On November 5, a settlement was filed, effectively ending the lawsuit.

== New Jersey ==
=== Donald J. Trump for President v. Way ===
In August 2020, the Trump campaign sued New Jersey state officials in federal court, seeking to overturn an executive order issued by governor Phillip Murphy. In response to the COVID-19 pandemic, Murphy had ordered that mail-in ballots should be sent to all active voters in the state. The Trump campaign argued that the order violates the U.S. Constitution, which gives power to state legislatures to conduct congressional elections and select electors for the U.S. presidency. Thereafter, the New Jersey state legislature enacted legislation to the same effect as the governor's order. In September, the Trump campaign asked U.S. District Judge Michael Shipp to prohibit vote counting before election day, and the counting of mail-in ballots that are not postmarked and received after election day. On October 6, Judge Shipp denied the request.

== Pennsylvania ==
=== Pennsylvania Democratic Party v. Boockvar ===
Pennsylvania Democratic Party v. Boockvar was a case concerning the whether some sort of accommodations should be granted to citizens due to the COVID-19 pandemic. This case was primarily filed in response to the decision of the Commonwealth Court of Pennsylvania in Delisle v. Boockvar from a couple weeks prior in which the court denied statewide injunctive relief for the 2020 Pennsylvania Primaries due to the COVID-19 pandemic. Among the accommodations sought by the Pennsylvania Democratic Party was a request to count ballots received up to 3 days after 8 p.m on Election Day so long as they were not clearly postmarked after Election Day. The case was originally filed by the Pennsylvania Democratic Party against the Secretary of the Commonwealth of Pennsylvania, Kathy Boockvar, in the Commonwealth Court of Pennsylvania on July 10, 2020, but ultimately raised to the Supreme Court of Pennsylvania. The Supreme Court of Pennsylvania on September 8 decided that "Based on our disposition of all of the claims set forth above, we grant relief ... and hold that the Election Code permits county boards of election to collect hand-delivered mail-in ballots at locations other than their office addresses including drop-boxes as indicated herein, a three-day extension of the absentee and mail-in ballot received-by deadline is adopted such that ballots mailed by voters via the United States Postal Service and postmarked by 8:00 p.m. on Election Day, November 3, 2020, shall be counted if they are otherwise valid and received by the county boards of election on or before 5:00 p.m. on November 6, 2020; ballots received within this period that lack a postmark or other proof of mailing, or for which the postmark or other proof of mailing is illegible, will be presumed to have been mailed by Election Day unless a preponderance of the evidence demonstrates that it was mailed after Election Day; the poll watcher residency requirement set forth in ... is constitutional." Starting on September 22, 2020, Pennsylvania State Legislature Republicans led by Joe Scarnati filed applications seeking a stay on the decision of the case. These applications for stay were unsuccessful in both the Pennsylvania Supreme Court and the United States Supreme Court. The denial of the application filled in the United States Supreme Court was denied in a 4-4 decision due to Justice Amy Coney Barrett not being confirmed yet. The denial of these applications led to both United States Supreme Court cases Republican Party of Pennsylvania v. Boockvar (No. 20-542) and Scarnati v. Pennsylvania Democratic Party (No. 20-574).

=== Republican Party of Pennsylvania v. Boockvar and Scarnati v. Pennsylvania Democratic Party ===
Republican Party of Pennsylvania v. Boockvar (No. 20-542) and Scarnati v. Pennsylvania Democratic Party (No. 20-574) are two pending United States Supreme Court cases on whether the Supreme Court of Pennsylvania had the authority to provide the injunctive and declaratory relief in Pennsylvania Democratic Party v. Boockvar. This includes whether they had the authority to provide injunctive relief allowing ballots received in the state after 8 p.m. on Election Day to count. The first of these cases, Republican Party of Pennsylvania v. Boockvar, filed its first petition for writ of certiorari on October 23, 2020. A few days later on October 27, 2020, Scarnati v. Pennsylvania Democratic Party filed its first petition for writ of certiorari. The next day on October 28, 2020, the United States Supreme Court rejected a motion to expedite Republican Party of Pennsylvania v. Boockvar. On November 6, 2020, Justice Samuel Alito ordered all ballots received after 8 p.m on Election Day to be kept and tabulated separately pending the outcome of this litigation. On November 30, 2020, the cases were vided together to allow the two cases to be treated as one and a brief filed in one would apply to the other as well. On December 16, 2020, the case briefs were distributed for the conference occurring on January 8, 2020. Due to Congress counting the electoral votes on January 6, 2020, it seems likely the cases will be dismissed as being moot barring any delay arising from Congress or expediency from the Supreme Court.

== Texas ==
Several lawsuits were filed in Texas prior to the election.

=== Harris County drive-through voting suits ===
A number of lawsuits were brought against Harris County, the state's most populous county, challenging its drive-thru voting system set up as one of an array of measures to mitigate COVID-19 infection risk. Joe Straus, a former Republican Speaker of the Texas House, called the lawsuits "patently wrong".

=== Hotze v. Hollins ===
This action was filed on October 28, 2020, in federal court in Houston by Republican activist Steven Hotze and GOP candidates. U.S. District Judge Andrew Hanen dismissed the complaint on November 2, finding that the plaintiffs lacked standing. It was also reported that he stated during the remotely-conducted motion hearing that the Republicans needed to prove an "evil motive" to have the ballots thrown out and finding that they failed to do so. An emergency motion in the United States Court of Appeals for the Fifth Circuit was unsuccessful.

=== In re Steven Hotze, M.D., Harris County Republican Party, Hon. Keith Nielsen, and Sharon Hemphill ===
The Harris County Republican Party was joined by others in filing a mandamus petition with the Texas Supreme Court asking for a stop to drive-through voting in Harris County. The Texas Supreme Court denied the petition on October 22, 2020.

=== In re Steven Hotze, M.D., Wendell Champion, Hon. Steven Toth, and Sharon Hemphill ===
Nearly identical to the previous petition, this original proceeding was filed in the Texas Supreme Court on October 27, 2020. The plaintiffs asked the court to invalidate almost 127,000 votes already cast via drive-through facilities. This motion was denied by the Texas Supreme Court on November 1, 2020.

=== Texas Democratic Party v. Abbott ===
On April 7, 2020, the Texas Democratic Party and several voters filed a lawsuit against state officials in federal court, seeking to change Texas state law that requires voters under age 65 to provide an excuse in order to vote by mail. In May, U.S. District Judge Fred Biery issued a preliminary injunction to allow all eligible voters to vote by mail, ruling that the state's differing treatment of voters based on age violated the Twenty-sixth Amendment to the United States Constitution.

On June 4, a motions panel of the U.S. Court of Appeals for the 5th Circuit put a hold on Judge Biery's ruling pending appeal. The Texas Democratic Party then filed a petition with the U.S. Supreme Court, asking for Judge Biery's ruling to be reinstated, but the justices denied the petition. On September 10, a different panel of the 5th Circuit issued a lengthy merits opinion that vacated Judge Biery's preliminary injunction, finding that the Texas law limiting no-excuse mail-in voting did not violate the Twenty-sixth Amendment. The court sent the case back to the district court for further proceedings on legal claims that the appeals court had not reached, including an equal protection challenge to the differential treatment of voters based on their age under pandemic conditions.

=== Texas League of United Latin American Citizens v. Abbott ===
On October 1, 2020, the Texas League of United Latin American Citizens and the National League of United Latin American Citizens, plus the League of Women Voters and two Texas voters, filed a lawsuit against Texas Governor Greg Abbott in federal district court. The groups sought to block the Governor's order limiting the number of absentee ballot drop-off sites to one per county, arguing that the order violated the U.S. Constitution and federal Voting Rights Act because it imposed burdens on older, sick, and disabled voters and disproportionately affected more populous counties.

U.S. District Judge Robert Pittman agreed and enjoined enforcement of the limit on drop-off sites. On appeal, a motions panel of the U.S. Court of Appeals for the 5th Circuit sided with the state, finding that the Governor's order "abridges no one's right to vote". The court placed an immediate stay on Judge Pittman's order, allowing the limit on drop-off sites to remain in place through the remainder of the 2020 U.S. presidential election season. The Texas Supreme Court followed the Fifth Circuit in denying a similar challenge by different plaintiffs in a parallel case litigated in state court, although the latter relied on state law, rather than federal law.

== Washington ==
=== Washington v. Trump ===
State of Washington v. Trump (No. 1:20-cv-03127) hinged on whether recent changes announced to the United States Postal Service violate federal administrative rulemaking requirements and infringe upon the rights of states to regulate elections under the Constitution. On October 30, 2020, the court issued an order regarding election mail.

== See also ==
- Post-election lawsuits related to the 2020 U.S. presidential election
