= Transgender military ban in the United States =

The transgender military ban in the United States took several forms. This is a list of articles covering the subject.

First ban

- Executive Order 10450
- Army Regulation 40-501: Standards of Medical Fitness
- Department of Defense (DoD) Directive 1332.14 – Enlisted Administrative Separations
- DoD Directive 1332.30 – Separation of Regular Commissioned Officers
- Department of Defense Instruction (DoDI) 6130.03 – Medical Standards for Appointment, Enlistment, or Induction into the Military Services

Second ban

- Presidential Memorandum on Military Service by Transgender Individuals (2017)
- Presidential Memorandum on Military Service by Transgender Individuals (2018)
  - Department of Defense Instruction 1300.28
  - DoDI 1300.28: Military Service by Transgender Persons and Persons with Gender Dysphoria

Third ban

- Executive Order 14183
