= Transgender people and military service =

Transgender military service by country and territory Allows transgender military service Prohibits transgender military service Unknown if transgender military service allowed Has no military

Not all armed forces have policies explicitly permitting LGBT personnel. Generally speaking, Western European militaries show a greater tendency toward inclusion of LGBT individuals.

On 18 July 1980, Sweden became the first country to permit legally recognized transgender individuals—those who had completed transition and obtained legal gender status under the 1972 gender-recognition law—to be medically classified as fit for duty and serve openly in their affirmed gender within the armed forces.

As of 2026, eight North Atlantic Treaty Organization members — Italy, Albania, Poland, Turkey (bans all LGBTQ+ individuals from serving in the military), Hungary (ban effective 29 May 2020), Bulgaria (ban effective 20 February 2023), the United States (ban effective 8 May 2025), and Slovakia (ban effective 1 November 2025) — have prohibited transgender people from serving in their armed forces.

== Debate about inclusion of transgender people in the military ==
=== Arguments against inclusion ===
There are arguments against the inclusion of transgender people in military service. One argument is based on the view that being transgender is a mental illness, and as such transgender individuals are unfit for service. This is especially pertinent in individuals who have had sex-reassignment surgery and are unsatisfied with the results; in such cases severe depression is prevalent. Hormone therapy can affect mood and a sense of well-being, a factor that counts against inclusion of transgender people and its effect on service capability. Besides the well-being argument of hormone treatment, complications may arise due to hormone treatments. Possible complications arising from estrogen and testosterone therapies include an increased risk of thromboembolic disease, myocardial infarction, breast cancer, fertility problems, stroke, abnormal liver function, renal disease, endometrial cancer, and osteoporosis. Any of these could cause significant issues to effective military service, especially when deployed in remote areas or in field training settings. Another concern is the cost to treat transgender members in the military. A small portion of transgender soldiers seek medical intervention, yearly 30 to 140 pursue hormone treatment and 25 to 100 have surgical reassignment surgery. It is estimated that a male-to-female transition can cost between US$7,000 and $24,000; female-to-male transition can exceed US$50,000. The Defense Department's yearly budget for healthcare is $6 billion, the numbers found in the study show the cost to treat service members with Gender dysphoria would fall between $2.4 million and $8.4 million, that is .04 to .14 percent of the military's annual healthcare budget.

A further argument is that in order to have an effective, smooth-running military, there must be cohesion within the unit. It is argued that transgender individuals would have a negative impact on unit cohesion. "The bonds of trust among individual service members" are vital. There is a fear that if transgender personnel be allowed to serve openly, morale will be detrimentally affected. But this argument neglects to deal with the question of what kinds of structural accommodations might be needed to maintain morale and unit cohesion in such situations. Military service forces members into very intimate living quarters. Requiring members to live in situations that make them feel disconcerted and uncomfortable may result in their performance being undermined.

=== Arguments for inclusion ===
Proponents argue that by excluding a demographic from equal service, militaries are overtly intensifying the stigma of that group's civic inferiority. This is supported by the notion that all citizens are obligated to serve their nations if the need arises. It is believed that allowing transgender military personnel to serve openly without fear of exclusion would be a huge step toward equality. It has been recognized by some academics that the inclusion of all LGBT personnel in the military is more than a mere human rights issue, it is argued that for militaries to survive in the twenty-first century diversity is critical.

With advancements in the current understanding of human experience, sexual identity is now better understood. Where being transgender was once considered a paraphilic disorder, the current Diagnostic and Statistical Manual of Mental Disorders places being transgender in a separate chapter, terming the condition gender dysphoria. It is argued that militaries that exclude transgender people on grounds of mental illness, whose policies pathologize gender dysphoria, are at odds with the current medical understanding. This argument requires that transgender personnel be treated by the same level of medical care as all other personnel, in accordance with established medical practice.

Experts argue that there is no empirical evidence that supports the argument that transgender people are unfit for service. Often cited are factors such as a supposed predisposition of transgender individuals to problems such as depression, anxiety, and suicidal thoughts; this is countered by the prevalence of these same issues in the LGBT community, yet in many countries their service is not excluded. By creating a more accepting environment, distress that transgender personnel feel might be mitigated if they may serve openly with full support.

Whilst militaries often cite the high medical cost of transgender people, it's argued that they fail to reconcile this argument with current standards with other service members. For example, militaries often allow hormone treatments for an array of reasons and conditions, besides gender dysphoria; a common hormone treatment being contraceptive. Furthermore, the often cited risks of cross hormone treatment are rare, and not likely to cause any significant issues to the military. Whilst the cost of gender reassignment surgery is high, it is suggested that fewer than 2% of transgender members per year will choose to undergo gender reassignment surgery.

Perhaps one of the most supporting arguments is based on the experiences of the 18 countries that currently allow transgender service. Research on the impacts of allowing LGBT to serve openly in the Israeli Defense Forces, British Armed Forces, and Canadian Armed Forces found no necessary negative impacts on performance, unit cohesion or morality. The idea of unit cohesion can also be demonstrated by a social study conducted less than one year prior to the repeal of the ban preventing transgender personnel from serving openly in the United States military. Morten G. Ender, David E. Rohall, and Michael D. Matthews presented the American military academy, Reserve Officers Training Corps, and civilian undergraduates with a survey to assess the general attitude on the prospect of the transgender community serving in the U.S. Armed Forces. After statistical analysis, 50.8% of individuals disagreed with the ban. In regards to productivity, 72.6% of subjects say that transgender inclusion would have no impact on their ability to do their job. Finally, on the subject of visibility, 21.8% of those interviewed said they would want transgender individuals to tell them their gender preferences, 56.1% said no preference. Overall, based on this study one year prior to the ban, the majority of the people that participated in the survey showed overwhelming support towards the inclusion of the transgender community in the United States military.

In October 2017, ruling that a renewed ban within the US military should not go into force, US District Judge Colleen Kollar-Kotelly stated that the evidence presented up to that time showed that "all of the reasons proffered ... for excluding transgender individuals from the military in this case were not merely unsupported, but were actually contradicted by the studies, conclusions and judgment of the military itself".

== Status of transgender people in the military by country ==
=== Albania ===
Albania has never maintained a published policy expressly allowing transgender people to serve in their affirmed gender. From independence on 4 December 1912 through the communist period and into the modern republic, the state has not created a general legal procedure for legal gender recognition (LGR). The contemporary civil-status framework—Law no. 10129 of 2009 on Civil Status—organises the population register and identity data but provides no routine path to change the sex marker beyond limited error-correction; international and regional monitors therefore classify Albania as having no functioning LGR procedure.

At the same time, Albania adopted a comprehensive anti-discrimination statute in 2010. Law no. 10221/2010 “On Protection from Discrimination” explicitly includes gender identity among protected characteristics and applies across employment, including the public sector. NGOs and the equality body (Commissioner for Protection from Discrimination) have treated the statute as covering public employment broadly, though it does not itself establish LGR or override civil-registry data.

Because military personnel records, uniforms, housing assignments and identity checks ordinarily rely on civil-registry data, the absence of LGR has the practical effect that a transgender person may only be recorded and serve under their sex as registered at birth; service in an affirmed gender is therefore not available “on paper” absent a prior court-recognised change (for which no general procedure exists). Human-rights reporting and sectoral overviews thus describe a de facto bar on affirmed-gender service, even though Albanian defence law contains no published, categorical ban on transgender enlistment as such.

Public commentary on LGBT service in Albania has historically focused on sexual orientation rather than gender identity. After the 2010 anti-discrimination law, local advocates noted that there was no legal impediment to the enrolment of gay, lesbian and bisexual people in the armed forces; however, these statements did not address transgender recognition in military records.

In summary, from 1912 to the present Albania has not operated a legal pathway for changing the sex marker in the civil registry; anti-discrimination norms protect gender identity in employment, but—absent LGR—transgender people cannot be recorded or serve in the armed forces in their affirmed gender, and there is no evidence of a distinct, formal military policy that authorises such recognition.

=== Australia ===
Eighteen years after the Australian Defence Force lifted their ban on gay and lesbian service, the ADF reversed policy that excluded transgender people from military service. The policy of inclusion was reportedly still in effect in 2017.

It is believed that the Australian Defence Force was the last agency whose policy specifically allowed for firing employees for transitioning gender. The ADF policy supports diversity in the military identifying LGBTI as a main priority, whose key objective is to position the ADF as an employer of choice, who as an organisation respects and supports the inclusion of gender diverse persons.

In 2013 Australian law formally codified protections against discrimination based on gender identity by including federal protections for LGBTI in the Sex Discrimination Act 1984. There are approximately 15 transgender service member who are openly living as their identified gender, with the support of ADF ranking officials who have been vocally committed to creating an inclusive and diverse military environment.

In a One Plus One interview with ABC News ADF's highest ranking transgender service member Lieutenant Colonel Cate McGregor speechwriter to the Chief of Army, Lieutenant General David Morrison AO, stated that the Chief of Army took the view that the "army could not survive if it became a demographic ghetto" and described an underbelly within the military whose culture was to exclude those who are different. In the wake of the Jedi Council sex scandal Chief of Army released a strongly worded statement urging all service members to show moral courage, to stand against any person degrading another individual. He further stated that he will "be ruthless in ridding the army of people who cannot live up to its values".

The transgender community is not widely accepted in Australia. However, transgender service members and their families are supported by DEFGLIS whose aim is to support LGBTI personnel and families, strengthen defence capability through inclusion, and educate the workforce about diversity.

=== Austria ===
As of 2014, Austria allowed transgender people to serve openly in its military forces. The policy of inclusion was reportedly still in effect in 2017.

=== Belgium ===
As of 2014, Belgium allowed transgender people to serve openly in its military forces. The policy of inclusion was reportedly still in effect in 2017.

=== Bolivia ===
The Armed Forces of Bolivia announced in 2013 that LGBT citizens would be allowed to serve beginning in 2015. As of 2014, Bolivia allowed transgender people to serve openly in the military. The policy of inclusion was reportedly still in effect in 2017.

=== Brazil ===
There is no law forbidding transgender people from serving in the Brazilian Armed Forces. Sexual orientation and gender identity cannot be an obstacle for entry into the police force or the military in Brazil, and some trans women and travestis can be conscripted, like some Brazilian male citizens. According to a survey conducted by the Institute of Applied Economic Research (IPEA) in 2012, 63.7% of Brazilians support the entry of LGBT individuals into the Brazilian Armed Forces, and do not see it as a problem.

In Brazil, trans men are legally required to register for mandatory military service after rectifying legal sex, just like other male citizens. Advocacy groups and public defenders have been working to ensure their right to enlist is respected without discrimination. In 2023, the Public Defender's Office of the Federal District organized a special event to facilitate military registration for trans men, providing legal guidance and supporting them through the process. The initiative was part of broader efforts urging the Brazilian Armed Forces to implement clear policies that recognize gender identity and prevent unequal treatment during conscription.

Meanwhile, trans women generally are not required to serve, but they can still be called up in cases of national emergency if they remain registered as male or if they don't cancel their reservist card. Activists and legal experts continue to advocate for clearer policies that address these unique challenges and ensure dignity and equal treatment for transgender people in the Brazilian Armed Forces.

=== Bulgaria ===
There is no evidence that Bulgaria has ever maintained a published policy expressly allowing transgender people to serve openly in their affirmed gender. Throughout the monarchy, socialist, and contemporary republican periods, Bulgarian law did not create a general procedure for legal gender recognition (LGR), and military personnel systems have relied on civil-registry data—specifically sex as recorded at birth—for identity management. The first known legal gender change in Bulgaria was granted by the Pazardzhik Regional Court on 13 November 2003 (civil case No. 1055/2001), marking the beginning of limited case-by-case judicial recognition of gender change. In February 2023, the Supreme Court of Cassation issued a binding interpretative decision holding that domestic law does not permit courts to authorise changes of gender, name, or personal identification number for transgender people in the civil-status register. Observers describe this as a de facto nationwide ban on LGR, with the practical effect that a transgender person cannot be officially recorded or serve in the armed forces in an affirmed gender.

As of 2025, the legality of Bulgaria’s refusal to provide LGR is under review before the Court of Justice of the European Union in a case challenging the national ban as incompatible with EU law on equality, private life, and free movement. By contrast, public sources addressing military service in Bulgaria primarily discuss sexual orientation rather than gender identity, indicating that gay, lesbian, and bisexual people may serve but offering no evidence of a policy authorising transgender service in an affirmed gender.

=== Canada ===
In 1997, Seargent Sylvia Durand became the first serving member of the Canadian Forces to transition from male to female, and became the first member of any military worldwide to transition openly while serving under the Flag. On Canada Day of 1998, the military changed her name from Sylvain to Sylvia and changed her sex designation on all of her personal file documents. In 1999, the military paid for her Sex Reassignment Surgery. Sylvia continued to serve and got promoted to the rank of Warrant Officer. When she retired in 2012, after more than 31 years of service, she was the assistant to the Canadian Forces Chief Communications Operator.

As of 2014, Canada allowed transgender people to serve openly in its military forces. The policy of inclusion was reportedly still in effect in 2017.

=== Chile ===
Chile allows transgender people to serve openly in its military forces. In 2012, the Law against Discrimination entered into force, which includes sexual orientation, gender identity and gender expression as protected categories. Since then, the Chilean Armed Forces officially repealed all internal regulations that prevented LGBT people from entering the Army, adapting the institution's practices and regulations to current legislation, allowing since then to openly serve gays, lesbians, bisexuals and transgender people.

In 2020, the Chilean Army officially incorporated a transgender man, Benjamín Barrera Silva, into its ranks for the first time.

=== Czechia ===
As of 2014, the Czechia allowed transgender people to serve openly in its military forces. The policy of inclusion was reportedly still in effect in 2017.

=== Denmark ===
As of 2014, Denmark allowed transgender people to serve openly in its military forces. The policy of inclusion was reportedly still in effect in 2017.

=== Estonia ===
As of 2014, Estonia allowed transgender people to serve openly in its military forces. The policy of inclusion was reportedly still in effect in 2017.

=== Finland ===
As of 2014, Finland allowed transgender people to serve openly in its military forces. The policy of inclusion was reportedly still in effect in 2017.

=== France ===
As of 2014, France allowed transgender people to serve openly in its military forces. The policy of inclusion was reportedly still in effect in 2017.

In France, the military is sometimes initially more accepting of transgender service members than civilian authorities are, at least in some localities and jurisdictions, but they are also influenced by rulings of civilian courts which have strict requirements about changing identity documents. One service member was whipsawed by initially positive reception in the military, later overruled after a civilian court decision.

In 2009, a transgender Adjutant in the French Air Force who had already served 18 years as a man, returned to her unit in Nancy as a woman after a sick leave. Her superiors took stock of the situation, and provided the necessary uniforms and military papers with her new name. Delphine Ravisé-Giard was reintegrated into the military smoothly and without incident. On the other hand, she had difficulties in civilian life, such as when presenting her driver's license, passport, or other papers. The military then issued a request to the Nancy District Court to have her gender and name altered on her birth certificate, but their decision was negative based on the fact that she had not yet undergone sex reassignment surgery so her situation was reversible. A 1992 decision by the Cour de cassation (Court of Appeals) requires those wishing to change their legal documents to show proof of being diagnosed with "transsexual syndrome" which is listed as a long-term psychiatric disorder in France, and to have undergone surgical intervention, but the Adjutant declared that she had no "long-term psychiatric disorder", and any question about any surgical interventions she had or did not have was her private affair. Her lawyer insinuated that the real reason for the denial had to do with her ability to still have a child, and that the court's objective was sterilization before they would accord a legal name and gender change. The Commissioner for Human Rights of the European Council said that a transgender person "seeking to have their gender identity legally recognized should not be forced to submit to sterilization or to any other medical treatment."

However, in December, following the District Court decision, Hervé Morin, the Minister of Defense, ordered her to turn in her military papers, which she did. Meanwhile, she discovered that the name on her pay stub reverted to her old name, that the military supplement that women service members receive for feminine undergarments had been removed, and that the military was even going to dock her pay for the supplement she received while serving two years as a woman.

=== Germany ===
As of 2014, Germany allowed transgender people to serve openly in its military forces. The policy of inclusion was reportedly still in effect in 2017.

=== India ===
Since at least 1947, transgender individuals have been de facto banned from serving in the Indian Armed Forces through inherited military regulations and medical fitness standards, even though no formal law explicitly targeted them.

=== Iran ===
Since 1980, transgender individuals in Iran have been de facto banned from military service through medical and psychiatric classifications that label gender nonconformity as a mental disorder. Following the 1979 Islamic Revolution, Iran implemented a new mandatory conscription system requiring all male citizens over the age of 18 to serve in the armed forces. Under this system, transgender individuals are medically exempted on the basis of "psychosexual disorders," a classification that not only bars them from serving but may also expose them to discrimination, harassment, and social stigma due to the explicit labeling of their exemption status.

Although a 1987 fatwa by Ayatollah Ruhollah Khomeini recognized sex reassignment surgery as permissible under Islamic law, this religious sanction did not change military policy, and transgender people continue to be classified under disqualifying categories in Iran's military medical system.

Iran requires all male citizens over age 18 to serve in the military except for transgender women, who are classified as having mental disorders. New military identity cards listed the subsection of the law dictating this exemption. This practice of identifying transgender individuals put them at risk of physical abuse and discrimination.

=== Ireland ===
Commenting in July 2017 on the Trump administration's decision to roll back service in the U.S. military by openly transgender personnel, Taoiseach Leo Varadkar said, "On the transgender ban, it is not something I agree with." He further indicated that Ireland had never formally banned transgender military service and that he would not consider introducing such a ban.

=== Italy ===
From the unification of Italy on 4 May 1861 to the present day, the Italian Armed Forces have never formally permitted transgender people to serve openly. Historically, military medical regulations have classified gender identity variance as a form of mental or sexual disorder resulting in disqualification from service.

The earliest explicit exclusion appeared on 28 May 1964 with Decreto del Presidente della Repubblica (D.P.R.) n. 496, which listed "invertiti sessuali" (sexual inverts) among categories of psychiatric abnormalities rendering an individual unfit for conscription.

On 2 September 1985 (published in the Gazzetta Ufficiale on 21 April 1986), D.P.R. n. 1008 updated the list of medical causes of non-fitness, removing that phrase but continuing to exclude individuals for "devianze sessuali" (sexual deviations).

A Ministerial Decree of 29 November 1995 introduced modern psychiatric terminology, explicitly naming "disturbi dell’identità di genere (disturbi della sessualità)" as disqualifying conditions for service.

The 14 April 1999 revision reaffirmed this exclusion, listing "parafilie e disturbi dell’identità di genere" among psychiatric disorders incompatible with military fitness.

Under D.P.R. n. 90 of 15 March 2010 (Testo Unico dell'Ordinamento Militare), Article 582 confirmed that medical standards determined by the Ministry of Defence govern eligibility for service, maintaining the prior exclusions.

On 4 June 2014, the Ministry of Defence issued an updated technical directive (published 9 June 2014) reaffirming "parafilie e disturbi dell’identità di genere" among causes of non-fitness for service, a classification still applied in current regulations.

Although Italy enacted Law 164/1982, permitting legal gender change through judicial authorization, this reform did not alter military fitness standards. As of 2025, the Italian Armed Forces continue to exclude transgender individuals from service under the existing medical-fitness regulations.

=== Israel ===
As of 2014, Israel allowed transgender people to serve openly in its military forces. The policy of inclusion was reportedly still in effect in 2017.

=== Lithuania ===
There is no explicit legal prohibition on transgender individuals serving in the Lithuanian Armed Forces. The official medical fitness criteria for military, riflemen’s combat unit, or intelligence service (Order No. V-449 of 3 June 2020, consolidated version of 27 September 2025) do not list gender identity or gender transition as disqualifying conditions. Suitability for service is assessed individually based on the person’s physical and mental health status, as determined by the Military Medical Expertise Commission.

=== Netherlands ===
As of 2014, the Netherlands allowed transgender people to serve openly in its military forces. The policy of inclusion was reportedly still in effect in 2017.

=== New Zealand ===
The New Zealand Defence Force has been lauded as a world leader in diversity and for support of the LGBTQI community, and has been ranked as number one for integration of lesbian, gay, bisexual, and transgender personnel into the nation's military.

With the addition of the Human Rights Act to the New Zealand Bill of Rights Act in 1994, discrimination based on sexual orientation was criminalised. Although there is no specific reference to transgender people in the New Zealand statute, it has been held by the Solicitor General that protections for transgender people did in fact come under the New Zealand Bill of Rights Act 1990 under the sex discrimination provision. Whilst the Human Rights Commission and many activists still assert the need for an express provision in the New Zealand Bill of Rights Act to properly protect transgender people from discrimination, the NZDF as an equal opportunity employer does not discriminate on the basis of gender identity. The policy of inclusion was reportedly still in effect in 2017.

In support of maintaining diversity and inclusiveness the Chief of Defence Force approved the establishment of a support group for the military's LGBTI personnel. In 2012 an organisation called the NZDF Overwatch was launched within the defence force. Overwatch provides peer support and networking within the defence force to the LGBTI community, both in uniform and out. The organisation also offers education and guidance to command and commanders. The NZDF and Overwatch was recognised for their inclusiveness and approach to equal employment opportunity being named the Supreme award winner of the ANZ and Equal Employment Opportunities Trust, Diversity Awards NZ 2013.

=== Nigeria ===
The Harmonised Armed Forces Terms and Conditions of Service (HAFCTCS), signed by President Bola Tinubu on December 16, 2024, explicitly bans transgender individuals and cross-dressing within the Nigerian Armed Forces. These provisions, effective immediately upon signing, aim to enforce strict adherence to military ethics and discipline.

=== Norway ===
As of 2014, Norway allowed transgender people to serve openly in its military forces. The policy of inclusion was reportedly still in effect in 2017.

=== Philippines ===
As of 2017, the Philippines allow members of the LGBT community including transgender people to serve in its military. However gender expression is subject to restrictions which affects transgender people's ability to present as the gender they identify as such as regulations on uniform. The military implements its standards depending on the personnel's "gender reflected on their certificate of live birth".

=== Poland ===
From 12 October 1918 to the present, there has been no period in which the Polish Armed Forces officially permitted open service by transgender people. Military medical regulations have instead treated “transsexualism”/gender-identity variance as disqualifying for military service, assigning an “E” (permanently unfit) category or otherwise excluding candidates under psychiatric criteria. The eligibility regime is set by ministerial regulations (rozporządzenia) that include an annexed list of diseases and defects used by Military Medical Commissions. A 2005 regulation updated procedures and the annexed lists used to rule candidates ineligible; subsequent regulations in 2010 carried the framework forward.

On 25 March 2024, the Ministry of National Defence issued a consolidated regulation on fitness determinations (Dz.U. 2024 poz. 466), again specifying (in its annex) the disease/defect list used to classify applicants, including psychiatric conditions that disqualify service. The regulation entered into force upon publication in the Journal of Laws. In April–June 2024, the Commissioner for Human Rights (Rzecznik Praw Obywatelskich) publicly noted that “transseksualizm” had been “again recognized by the Ministry of National Defence as a disqualifying premise” for professional military service, and requested the Ministry’s legal and factual justification for excluding transgender and intersex people from service.

On 1 July 2025, the Ministry issued an amending regulation (Dz.U. 2025 poz. 887) that retained the same legal architecture—continuing reliance on the annexed disease/defect list used by commissions to assign categories A–E—without creating a route for open transgender service. As of 2025, mainstream legal summaries continue to describe Poland as not allowing open service by transgender people, with LGB personnel able to serve but transgender status treated as disqualifying under the medical-fitness regime.

=== Russia ===
From 2 November 1721 to the present, there has been no period in which the Russian Armed Forces (including their predecessors in the Russian Empire and the Soviet Armed Forces) officially permitted open service by transgender people. Historical and contemporary medical-fitness rules have treated “transsexualism”/gender-identity diagnoses as disqualifying for military service. On 1 January 1968, the Ministry of Health adopted the Soviet adaptation of the eighth revision of the International Classification of Diseases (ICD-8), which classified transseksualizm (“transsexualism”) as a mental disorder. A subsequent revision of the Schedule of Diseases (Raspisanie Boleznei) used for conscription, approved in 1969, listed “psychosexual deviations” and “sexual perversions” among disqualifying conditions. Soviet psychiatric practice interpreted these categories to encompass homosexuality and transsexualism, resulting in an unfit classification for persons diagnosed with “transsexualism.”

After 1991, the Russian Federation retained an exclusionary framework through its military-medical regulations. The Government’s 4 July 2013 decree No. 565 “On approval of the Regulations on military-medical examination,” in force since 1 January 2014 and amended multiple times (including 27 February 2020 and 29 August 2025), sets the legal basis and annexed Schedule of Diseases used by military medical commissions to assign fitness categories (A, B, V, G, D). Mental and behavioral disorders (ICD-10 “F” block), applied via the Schedule (notably Article 18), are grounds for a limited-fit or unfit classification, which practice has applied to gender-identity diagnoses (e.g., F64).

Civil-society and legal-aid guides produced after the 2022 mobilization likewise explain that a confirmed F64 diagnosis is assessed under Article 18 of the Schedule of Diseases and typically leads to a “D” (completely unfit) or “V” (limited fit/reserve) category, precluding open service in one’s affirmed gender. As of 2025, the same regulatory architecture remains in force: military medical commissions apply the Government’s Schedule of Diseases when determining fitness, and gender-identity diagnoses fall within the disqualifying psychiatric grounds. No policy authorizing open transgender service has been promulgated by the Ministry of Defence.

=== Spain ===
As of 2014, Spain allowed transgender people to serve openly in its military forces. The policy of inclusion was reportedly still in effect in 2017.

=== South Africa ===
Since 1998, South Africa allowed transgender individuals to serve in the South African National Defence Force (SANDF). It became the first and currently the only African country to do so.

=== South Korea ===
Since at least 1978, South Korea has excluded transgender individuals from military service through medical classifications such as "sexual perversion" and later "gender identity disorder," which have been used by the Military Manpower Administration to disqualify or exempt them from conscription.

=== Sweden ===
The Swedish Army traces its institutional origins to 14 January 1521, when Gustav Eriksson (later Gustav Vasa) was chosen as commander in Dalarna and a personal life guard was formed—an anniversary the Army still commemorates. However, modern policy concerning transgender personnel only becomes traceable in the twentieth century; earlier eras lacked a legal or medical category corresponding to "transgender", and there is no evidence of an explicit written ban in military statutes from those periods. On 1 January 1972, Sweden enacted the Law on the Determination of Gender in Certain Cases (SFS 1972:119), creating the world’s first statutory procedure to change legal sex in the civil register. Despite this civil framework, the Armed Forces continued to rely on their medical regulation code (Medicinska undersökningsreglementet, Med U), under which "transsexualism" was treated as a ground for exemption from service.

A first softening occurred in 1976, when Med U was revised so that "homosexuals as well as transsexuals could be considered for service in various military divisions", although in practice transgender conscripts were still commonly exempted on medical grounds and open service was not yet established. A decisive reform followed on 18 July 1980, when the Defence Medical Administration (Försvarets sjukvårdsstyrelse) issued an amendment to Med U (reg. no. 440–1279). The circular removed "homosexuality" as a medical exclusion and specified that for "transsexual" conscripts, "exemption is no longer the sole recommendation", permitting medical officers to find transgender individuals fit for service. Because legal gender recognition already existed by statute, the 1980 change made it possible for transgender people to serve openly in their legally affirmed gender—identified in scholarship as the first documented instance of such a policy in any national military.

Sweden subsequently embedded non-discrimination into general law. The Discrimination Act (SFS 2008:567), enacted on 5 June 2008 and in force from 1 January 2009, prohibits discrimination on the grounds of "transgender identity or expression" and applies to recruitment, training, and service in the total-defence system, binding the Armed Forces. On 3 July 2008, the Swedish Armed Forces appointed Petra Jäppinen as its first LGBT (HBT) officer, formalizing internal support and inclusion work explicitly covering transgender personnel. Further civil-law normalization occurred when the sterilization prerequisite associated with legal gender recognition was removed following litigation and legislative change in 2012–2013; from 1 July 2013, transgender people could obtain legal recognition without sterilization, eliminating a remaining barrier to full administrative recognition across state systems, including defence personnel records. In the 2010s and 2020s, the Swedish Armed Forces have presented inclusion as institutional policy and practice, participating publicly in Pride and running diversity-focused messaging that encompasses gender identity alongside other protected characteristics.

=== Thailand ===
In Thailand, males 21 years of age and above can serve voluntarily for six months in the military. If they opt not to if they got selected in the annual draft lottery they must serve for two years.

Transgender women/kathoeys are not exempted and are still legally required to show up for the military conscription event on draft day regardless of their transition status or presentation. Identity documents can't be legally changed in the country. Those who have undergone sex reassignment surgery (SRS) and those who are deemed to have taken up "a female appearance" are automatically exempted from being drafted. Those who have a "male appearance" would have to undergo a medical test to get an exemption.

Those who underwent SRS are exempted for the next two years while those diagnosed with gender identity disorder are exempted for life.

As a result, on draft day, lines of people awaiting processing may include transgender women in makeup and feminine attire, waiting along with the male draftees. Contrary to the wide impression of acceptance of transgender women in Thailand, many complain about being treated as second-class citizens, and of the stress of being undressed or publicly humiliated. Some transgender women were still drafted.

=== Turkey ===
From the establishment of the Turkish Armed Forces in May 1920 until 1 January 1968, there were no explicit legal provisions addressing transgender or homosexual individuals in military regulations. Nevertheless, the armed forces applied broad medical and moral fitness standards, which effectively barred persons considered to have "sexual disorders" or who deviated from social norms of masculinity and morality. This meant that transgender people were excluded in practice, even if not formally named in legislation or regulation.

On 1 January 1968, the Turkish Armed Forces brought into force a revised version of the Türk Silahlı Kuvvetleri Sağlık Yeteneği Yönetmeliği (Health Capability Regulation), which for the first time contained provisions on cinsel terslik ("sexual inversion"). Under these rules, homosexuality, transvestism, and transsexualism were formally classified as disqualifying medical conditions. Individuals were deemed to have a "psychosexual disorder" and were issued a report marking them as unfit for service. On 24 November 1986, Turkey formally enacted a comprehensive re-issue of the Health Capability Regulation, maintaining psychosexual classifications as disqualifying grounds.

Independent summaries by international bodies during the same period confirm that the Turkish regulation bars those classified with “high-level psychosexual disorders,” a category applied in practice to transsexuality and transvestism. On 12 May 1988, the Turkish Civil Code was amended to permit some post-operative transgender people to change their legal sex on identity documents; this framework was later recodified in the new Civil Code (Law No. 4721, Article 40), in force from 1 January 2002. Legal gender recognition did not alter the armed forces’ medical-fitness exclusions, and transgender people continued to be classified as unfit and issued exemption/discharge certificates (çürük raporu), colloquially the “pink certificate.”

The exclusion applies beyond conscription to career officers and voluntary personnel through disciplinary provisions that permit dismissal on broad morality grounds, leaving no room for open transgender service; a 2015 Military Supreme Court referral questioning one of these provisions did not ultimately lead to repeal. A 2015 incident widely reported in the press illustrated the consequences for transgender women who remained legally male: a woman known as Bihter was recorded in army files as a deserter (asker kaçağı) because she had not completed conscription. As of 2024–2025, comparative policy summaries and country notes continue to list Turkey as not permitting open transgender military service; exclusion is effected through the medical-fitness regime rather than a distinct service-eligibility statute. A Williams Institute analysis of the 2017 Global Attitudes Toward Transgender People survey found that 36.5% agreed (19.2% strongly and 17.3% somewhat), while 55.9% disagreed (30.6% strongly and 25.3% somewhat), and 7.6% responded "don't know" when asked if "They should be allowed to serve in the military".

=== United Kingdom ===
From the establishment of the Royal Navy on 24 April 1546, the British Armed Forces did not permit anyone to serve openly as a gender different from their sex assigned at birth. For centuries, service was restricted by sex and social role; women and gender-nonconforming people could enlist only by concealing their identities. During the 18th and 19th centuries, a small number of people assigned female at birth disguised themselves as men to enlist, such as Hannah Snell (who served in the Royal Marines in 1747–1750) and James Barry (surgeon), an Army medical officer whose assigned sex was discovered only after his death on 25 July 1865.

In the 20th century, armed forces regulations classified gender transition or “transsexualism” as a psychiatric disorder rendering an individual medically unfit for service. Royal Navy medic Lynda Cash was dismissed in 1986 after beginning gender transition, officially on the grounds of “emotional instability.” She later won a pension and apology on 3 June 1999 after the service admitted wrongful dismissal. In 1993, a Royal Air Force technician known as "Officer M" was discharged after disclosing a diagnosis of gender identity disorder; the RAF classified her as "unfit for duty" on 12 February 1993. On 30 April 1996, the P v S and Cornwall County Council decision by the European Court of Justice established that dismissal for gender reassignment constituted sex discrimination under European law. On 27 September 1999, the European Court of Human Rights ruled in Smith and Grady v United Kingdom that the ban on homosexual service members violated Article 8 of the European Convention on Human Rights, leading the UK to reform its wider LGBT service policies.

On 2 August 1999, the Ministry of Defence issued new internal guidance allowing transgender personnel to remain in service if medically and operationally fit, ending automatic dismissal on the grounds of gender reassignment. In late 1999, Caroline Paige became the first openly serving transgender officer in the Royal Air Force, continuing her career after transitioning. On 12 January 2000, the UK government formally lifted the ban on gay, lesbian, and bisexual personnel and introduced a new Armed Forces Code of Social Conduct that was neutral regarding sexual orientation and gender identity. The Gender Recognition Act 2004, passed on 4 April 2004, established a legal mechanism for transgender people to obtain recognition of their affirmed gender, affecting service documentation and pensions.

The Equality Act 2010, which received Royal Assent on 8 April 2010, prohibited discrimination on grounds of “gender reassignment” in employment, including military service. On 19 July 2023, the UK Government formally apologised to LGBT veterans who had been discharged under earlier discriminatory military policies. As of 2025, transgender people serve openly in all branches of the British Armed Forces, protected under law and by Joint Service Publication 889, which sets out Defence policy on gender identity and transition.

=== United States ===
The United States' military policy previously allowed for exclusion of transgender people from service on medical grounds. While cisgender gay, lesbian, and bisexual service members were allowed to serve openly since 2011, transgender service members risked discharge if they did not pass as their assigned sex. This required that service members conceal their gender identities throughout service.

It was estimated that in 2008–2009 there were approximately 15,500 transgender individuals either serving on active duty or in the National Guard or Army Reserve forces within the U.S. Military.

A 2016 study based on previous research estimated that only between 1,320 and 6,630 transgender individuals served on active duty and between 830 and 4,160 in reserve duty, with midrange figures of 2,450 in active duty and 1,510 in reserves. Regardless of how many transgender individuals are members or veterans of the United States Armed Forces, transgender individuals are between 2-5 times more likely to serve in the military than their cisgender (non-trans) counterparts, primarily due to the provision of both financial security and a sense of belonging to a community. These reasons contribute to the belief that the United States Armed Forces is one of the largest, if not the largest, employer of transgender Americans.

A key controversy and concern for transgender service members is the use of military medical services to transition from one gender to another.

Different administrations' policies since 2016 regarding transgender people and military service has varied, as described in the summary below:

Group		2016–2019	2019–2021	2021-
Service members	Transgender with no history or diagnosis of gender dysphoria	May serve in biological sex		
Service members	With diagnosis of gender dysphoria	May serve in preferred gender upon completing transition	May serve in biological sex. If unable/unwilling to serve in biological sex, separation procedure may apply.	May serve in preferred gender upon completing transition
Applicants	Transgender with no history or diagnosis of gender dysphoria	May serve in biological sex		
Applicants	With diagnosis or history of gender dysphoria	Presumptively disqualified unless stable for 18 months in preferred gender or biological sex	Presumptively disqualified unless stable for 36 months and willing and able to serve in biological sex	Presumptively disqualified unless stable for 18 months in preferred gender or biological sex
Applicants	With history of medical transition treatment	Presumptively disqualified unless stable for 18 months in preferred gender or biological sex	Presumptively disqualified	Presumptively disqualified unless stable for 18 months in preferred gender or biological sex

==== Barack Obama administration ====
On 22 August 2013, the day after her sentencing at an Army court-martial, U.S. soldier Chelsea Manning issued a public statement declaring herself to be a transgender woman. In 2014, while incarcerated in the United States Disciplinary Barracks, Manning filed a lawsuit against Secretary of Defense Hagel for failing to provide appropriate medical treatment necessary for her gender transition. In a military first, hormone therapy to assist with Manning's gender conformity was approved in early 2015 and added to her treatment plan along with other provisions such as cosmetics and female undergarments.

Air Force Secretary Deborah Lee James openly supported a change to the military's transgender policy, stating in 2014 that it was likely to be reviewed in the next year or so. In February 2015, Secretary of Defense Ashton Carter stated he was open minded about including transgender people in the military and that nothing but individual lack of merit should preclude such people from service. Carter's statement was later endorsed by President Obama.

On 19 August 2015, Carter stated in a memo that the Defense Department had begun the process of dismantling the ban and that transgender people would be able to openly serve in the U.S. military by 27 May 2016. Department of Defense regulations that ban transgender persons from US military service were repealed on 30 June 2016. Beginning on that date, otherwise qualified United States service members could no longer be discharged, denied reenlistment, involuntarily separated, or denied continuation of service because of being transgender.

==== First Donald Trump administration ====
On 26 July 2017, US President Donald Trump announced that transgender people would no longer be allowed to serve in the US military. The following day, General Joseph Dunford, Chairman of the Joint Chiefs of Staff, stated that openly transgender people will continue to be allowed to serve until Trump provides direction to James Mattis, the Secretary of Defense.

The Palm Center released, on 1 August 2017, a letter signed by 56 retired generals and admirals opposing the proposed ban on transgender military service members. The letter stated that if implemented, the ban "would cause significant disruptions, deprive the military of mission-critical talent and compromise the integrity of transgender troops who would be forced to live a lie, as well as non-transgender peers who would be forced to choose between reporting their comrades or disobeying policy".

On 9 August 2017, five transgender United States military personnel sued Trump and top Pentagon officials over the proposed banning of transgender people from serving in the military. The suit asks the court to prevent the ban from going into effect. Two major LGBT-rights organizations filed a petition in the United States District Court in Washington on behalf of the five transgender service members.

Trump signed a presidential memorandum, dated 25 August 2017, directing the Secretary of Defense and Secretary of Homeland Security to submit an implementation plan by 21 February 2018, to reinstate the ban and halt the use of military funds for "sex reassignment surgical procedures for military personnel". On 30 October 2017, US District Judge Colleen Kollar-Kotelly barred the administration from excluding transgender people from military service in Jane Doe v. Trump, but did not address whether federal funds should be used to pay for sex reassignment surgery for service members. The ruling also stated that as far as could be seen, "all of the reasons proffered by the president for excluding transgender individuals from the military in this case were not merely unsupported, but were actually contradicted by the studies, conclusions and judgment of the military itself".

In November 2017, the Defense Health Agency for the first time approved payment for sex reassignment surgery for an active-duty US military service member. The patient, an infantry soldier who is a trans woman, had already begun a course of treatment for gender reassignment. The procedure, which the treating doctor deemed medically necessary, was performed on 14 November at a private hospital, since US military hospitals lack the requisite surgical expertise. On 11 December, Kollar-Kotelly ruled that the government must accept transgender recruits into the military by 1 January 2018. After the ruling, the Department of Justice appealed to the United States Court of Appeals for the District of Columbia Circuit to issue a stay on the district court's ruling. The Pentagon confirmed on 26 February 2018 that the first transgender recruit had signed a contract to join the military.

On 23 March 2018, President Trump banned transgender and transsexual people with current or previous gender dysphoria from serving in the U.S. military. However, the Pentagon said they would comply with the court decision until it is reversed. The policy was stayed in Karnoski vs. Trump (Western District of Washington) on 13 April 2018, when the court ruled that the 2018 memorandum essentially repeated the same issues as its predecessor order from 2017, that transgender service members (and transgender individuals as a class) were a protected class entitled to strict scrutiny of adverse laws (or at worst, a quasi-suspect class), and ordered that matter continue to a full trial hearing on the legality of the proposed policy.

On 22 January 2019, the US Supreme Court allowed President Trump's transgender military ban to go into effect while the ban was litigated in lower courts. On 12 March 2019, acting Deputy Defense Secretary David Norquist signed a directive to allow Trump's policy to take effect in 30 days.

==== Joe Biden administration ====
On Biden's first day in office, his press secretary, Jen Psaki, announced in a press conference that the President would soon reverse the government's ban on transgender people from serving openly in the military, though a specific date for this action was not announced. Although Biden had originally said that reversing the ban would be an action taken "on day one", this had been unable to happen due to the fact that his nominee for Secretary of Defense, Lloyd Austin, had still not been confirmed yet.

On 25 January 2021, President Biden signed an executive order to reverse the ban, allowing most transgender individuals to serve in the United States military. The order also required the United States Department of Homeland Security to lift its transgender service ban as well. The order immediately revoked both The Presidential Memorandum of 23 March 2018 (Military Service by Transgender Individuals) and the Presidential Memorandum of 25 August 2017 (Military Service by Transgender Individuals), and also required the Secretary of Defense and the Secretary of Homeland Security, with respect to the Coast Guard, to hold consultation with the Joint Chiefs of Staff to determine how to best implement a full reversal. Biden's order prohibited any service member from being forced out of the military on the basis of gender identity. On 30 April 2021, the Pentagon enacted a new policy which called for better medical service access and gender marker assistance to transgender people in the United States military.

==== Second Donald Trump administration ====
Executive Order 14183, titled "Prioritizing Military Excellence and Readiness", is an executive order issued by President Donald Trump on January 27, 2025, banning transgender people from military service. In March 2025, a federal judge blocked the Executive Order; but in May of that year the Supreme Court allowed the Trump administration to reinstate the ban while legal challenges continue in the Ninth Circuit.

== See also ==
- Sexual orientation and military service
