= Department of Defense Instruction 1300.28 =

U.S. memorandum limiting transgender service in the military

Military Service by Transgender Persons and Persons with Gender Dysphoria
- Presented: March 12, 2019
- Date effective: April 12, 2019
- Repealed: September 4, 2020
- Signatories: David L. Norquist, Under Secretary of Defense

Military Service By Transgender Persons and Persons with Gender Dysphoria
- Date effective: September 4, 2020
- Signatories: Matthew P. Donovan, Under Secretary of Defense for Personnel and Readiness

Directive-type Memorandum-19-004, "Military Service by Transgender Persons and Persons with Gender Dysphoria", was a memorandum issued by the United States Department of Defense (DoD) prohibiting most transgender individuals from serving or enlisting in the United States Armed Forces and the DoD. The DTM took effect on April 12, 2019, under the presidency of Donald Trump, signed by David Norquist. Originally scheduled to expire on March 12, 2020, it was extended until September 12, 2020. Before it expired, it was replaced by Department of Defense Instruction 1300.28, which took effect on September 4, 2020, signed by Matthew Donovan.

The memorandum banned new applicants who have any history of medical transition treatment. Applicants with a history of gender dysphoria were presumptively disqualified unless they have been deemed stable after 36 months and willing to detransition to their biological sex.

The memorandum drew controversy from some politicians, former military officials, the transgender rights movement, and other commentators. Several National Guards refused to enforce the ban. The memorandum was a topic in the 2020 United States presidential election.

After Joe Biden was elected and sworn in, one of his first executive orders was the repeal of the Presidential Memorandum on Military Service by Transgender Individuals. On January 25, 2021, Biden signed an executive order that required the DoD to reverse the memorandum, permitting transgender people to serve in the U.S. military.

== History ==
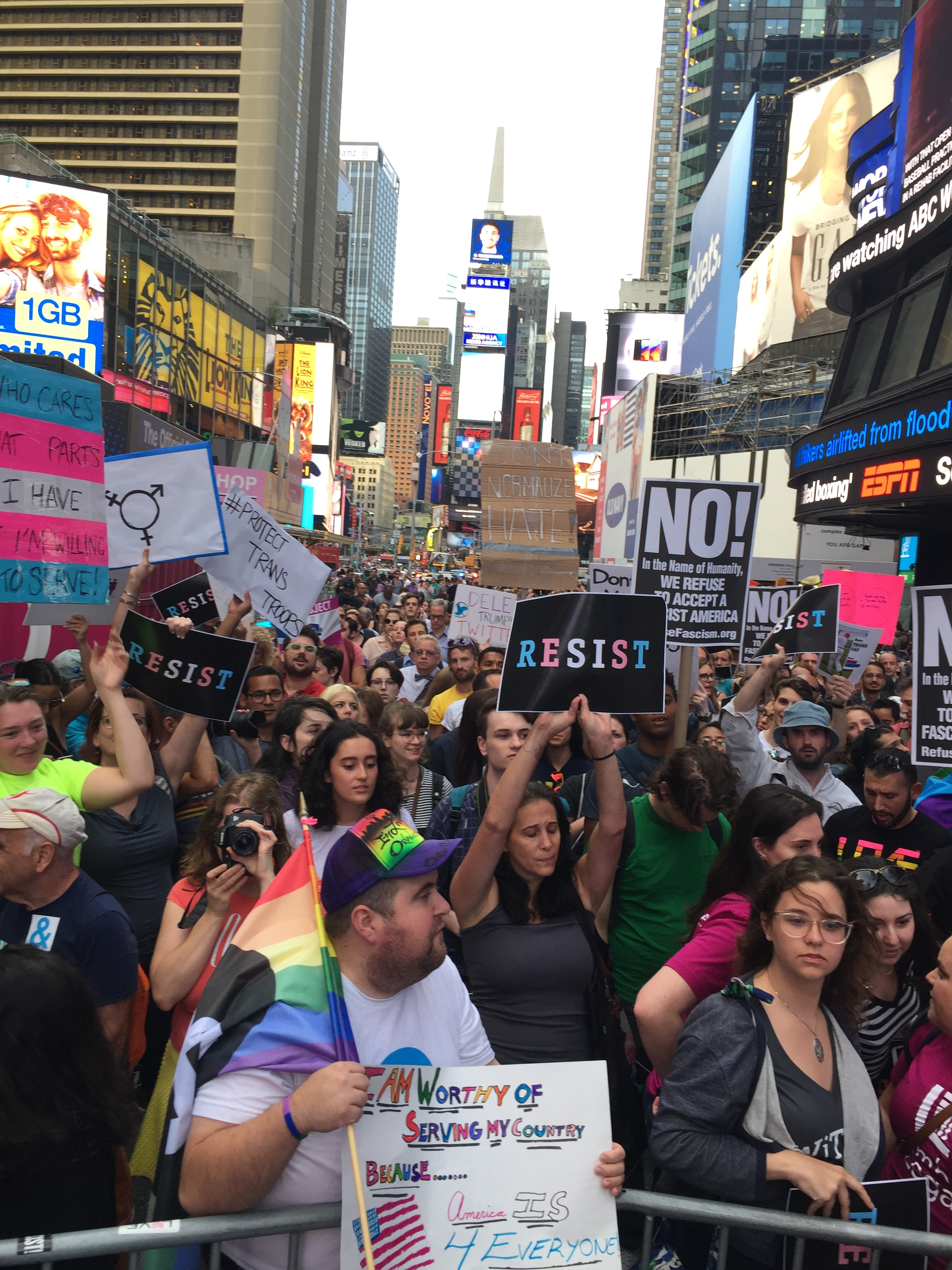
Protests against Trump's July 2017 tweet where he stated he would be banning transgender personnel in the military

On October 3, 2016, Donald Trump called transgender individuals serving the United States military "politically correct", but said he would leave such decisions to top military leaders. On May 16, 2017, a letter was signed by several right-leaning groups pushed for banning transgender individuals from the U.S. military. After the failure of passage of House Amendment 183, an amendment to prohibit the DoD from funding gender reassignment surgeries sponsored by Vicky Hartzler, to the National Defense Authorization Act for Fiscal Year 2018, House Republicans went to Defense Secretary James Mattis to make the prohibition, but he refused. An extensive DoD review of the policy was already underway, but a decision was not expected for months. House Republicans then went to the White House to make the prohibition. Chief strategist Steve Bannon encouraged Trump to deal with the matter now and played a role in pushing Trump to move ahead with banning transgender people from the military, despite the ongoing DoD review.

In July 2017, the Freedom Caucus threatened not to vote for the budget unless President Trump instituted some prohibition on paying for gender reassignment surgeries and hormone treatments for transgender people serving in the military. The interagency process had gone to work on the question, and the general counsels of the departments and agencies had weighed in. The Deputies Committee had met, and there were several Principals Committee meetings. There was no agreement, but four options were developed:

- Retain the Obama-era policy
- Give Secretary Jim Mattis leeway
- Ban transgender people from the military, but come up with a plan for transgender people currently serving
- Ban all transgender people from the military

On July 26, 2017, President Trump tweeted that he would ban transgender personnel in the United States military. According to Politico, President Trump had always planned to ban transgender individuals from the military and prohibit the DoD from funding gender reassignment surgeries. Per several congressional and White House sources, the tweet was a last-ditch attempt to save a House proposal that was a priority for Trump and was on the verge of defeat.

On August 4, 2017, a guidance called "A Guidance Policy for Open Transgender Service Phase Out" was approved by the White House Counsel's office. The guidance encourages early retirement, push out any enlisted personnel after their contract expired, and fire transgender officers who are up for promotion. The new policy did allow transgender service members to continue serving, but offered no protection from harassment or other efforts to get them to quit, along with prohibiting coverage of transitioning or other medical costs. The guidance was expected to be transmitted to the DoD the week of August 7, 2017, but tensions with North Korea, internal conflict within the White House, and pushback from the military prompted the authors of the policy to revise it again.

== Provisions ==
- Describes transgender military service as "special accommodations"
- No person, solely on the basis of his or her gender identity, will be denied accession, involuntarily separated or discharged, denied reenlistment or continuation of service, or subjected to adverse action or mistreatment within the United States military
- Transgender service members or applicants for accession to the United States military are subject to the same standards as cisgendered people
- When a standard, requirement, or policy depends on whether the individual is a male or a female ( e.g., medical fitness for duty; physical fitness and body fat standards; berthing, bathroom, and shower facilities; and uniform and grooming standards), all persons will be subject to the standard, requirement, or policy associated with their biological sex
- A history or diagnosis of gender dysphoria is disqualifying unless:
  - As certified by a licensed mental health provider, the applicant demonstrates 36 consecutive months of stability in the applicant's biological sex immediately preceding submission of the application without clinically significant distress or impairment in social, occupational, or other important areas of functioning; and
  - The applicant demonstrates that the applicant has not transitioned to his or her preferred gender and a licensed medical provider has determined that gender transition is not medically necessary to protect the health of the individual; and
  - The applicant is willing and able to adhere to all applicable standards
- A history of cross-sex hormone therapy or a history of sex reassignment or genital reconstruction surgery is disqualifying
- The accession standards will be reviewed and either maintained or changed no later than 24 months from the effective date of this DTM
- May consult with a military medical provider, receive a diagnosis of gender dysphoria, and receive mental health counseling, but may not obtain a gender marker change in DEERS or serve in their preferred gender
- The United States Department of Defense and the United States Coast Guard provide equal opportunity to all Service members, in an environment free from harassment and discrimination on the basis of race, color, national origin, religion, sex, gender identity, or sexual orientation
- Separation processing will not be initiated until the enlisted Service member has been formally counseled on his or her failure to adhere to such standards and has been given an opportunity to correct those deficiencies, or has been formally counseled that his or her indication that he or she is unable or unwilling to adhere to such standards may lead to processing for administrative separation and has been given an opportunity to correct those deficiencies
- Separation processing will not be initiated until the enlisted Service member has been counseled in writing that the condition does not qualify as a disability"

=== Exempt individuals ===
- Individuals are exempt from the ban if they had before the effective date of this DTM:
  - Entered into a contract for enlistment into the Military Services using DD Form 4, "Enlistment/Reenlistment Document Armed Forces of the United States", available on the DoD Forms Management Program website at DoD Forms Management, or an equivalent, or were selected for entrance into an officer commissioning program through a selection board or similar process; and
  - Either:
    - Were medically qualified for Military Service or selected for entrance into an officer commissioning program in their preferred gender in accordance with DTM-16-005; or
    - As a Service member, received a diagnosis of gender dysphoria from, or had such diagnosis confirmed, by a military medical provider

=== Waivers ===
- The Secretaries of Military Departments and the Commandant of the United States Coast Guard my grant full or partial waivers on a case by case individual basis for transgender individuals who are not exempt pursuant to this policy
- Delegating waiver authority may not be delegated lower than the Military Service Personnel Chiefs for the Secretaries of Military Departments and the Assistant Commandant for Human Resources for the Commandant of the United States Coast Guard.

Waivers are granted separately for gender dysphoria, to serve as one's preferred gender, and to receive maintenance hormone therapy. There is ambiguity as to the consequences of a denial of the waiver.

On May 14, 2020, for the first time the United States Navy granted a wavier to an anonymous Naval officer, who was facing involuntary discharge serve, to serve in their preferred gender, to include obtaining a gender marker change in (the Defense Enrollment Eligibility Reporting System) and being allowed to adhere to standards associated with their preferred gender, such as uniforms and grooming.

=== Comparison table ===
Restrictions 2016 versus 2019
Group		2016–2019	2019–2020
Service members	Transgender with no history or diagnosis of gender dysphoria	May serve in biological sex	
Service members	With diagnosis of gender dysphoria	May serve in preferred gender upon completing transition	May serve in biological sex. If unable/unwilling to serve in biological sex, separation procedure may apply.
Applicants	Transgender with no history or diagnosis of gender dysphoria	May serve in biological sex	
Applicants	With diagnosis or history of gender dysphoria	Presumptively disqualified unless stable for 18 months in preferred gender or biological sex	Presumptively disqualified unless stable for 36 months and willing and able to serve in biological sex
Applicants	With history of medical transition treatment	Presumptively disqualified unless stable for 18 months in preferred gender or biological sex	Presumptively disqualified

== Enforcement ==
As of August 7, 2019, according to the Washington Blade, the United States Army, United States Navy, United States Air Force, United States Marine Corps, and United States Coast Guard had engaged in no discharges under DTM-19-004. However, the Coast Guard reported denying enlistment to two applicants under DTM-19-004.

The National Guards of California, Colorado, Massachusetts, Nevada, New Jersey, New Mexico, Oregon, and Washington refused to enforce the transgender ban.

The Navy did not prohibit transgender personnel from expressing their identity off-duty and did not place gender restrictions on their clothing. However, regional commanders and the senior officers present could suspend or restrict the privilege of wearing preferred gender civilian attire to meet local conditions and host-nation agreements with foreign countries.

The United States Naval Academy planned to ban transgender people from attending the school in fall 2020.

== Retention bills ==
Congress	Bill numbers	Date introduced	Sponsors	# of cosponsors	Latest status
116th Congress	H.R. 2500	May 2, 2019	Adam Smith	1	House – December 7, 2019. The Clerk was authorized to correct section numbers, punctuation, and cross references, and to make other necessary technical and conforming corrections in the engrossment of H.R. 2500.
116th Congress	H.R. 2740	May 15, 2019	Rosa L. DeLauro	0	Senate – October 7, 2019. Read the second time. Placed on Senate Legislative Calendar under General Orders. Calendar No. 140.
116th Congress	H.R. 1032	February 7, 2019	Jackie Speier	23	House – August 2, 2019. Referred to the Subcommittee on Military Personnel.
116th Congress	S. 373	February 7, 2019	Kirsten Gillibrand	12	Senate – July 2, 2019. Read twice and referred to the Committee on Armed Services.

== Reactions ==
The memorandum had widespread support among Republicans. The Republican National Committee endorsed the trans ban from the military. Representative Ken Calvert of California called for the exclusion of trans soldiers due to "deployability" problems. Calvert stated, "Individuals with medical conditions that do not allow them to deploy, such as those identified in the policy, adversely impact military readiness and reduce the military's warfighting capability." However, some of Trump's supporters expressed their opposition to the ban, including Christopher R. Barron.

In August 2017, 56 retired generals and admirals signed on to a statement opposing the ban. Among them were General John R. Allen, General Robert W. Sennewald, and Vice Admiral Donald Arthur. The statement said in part: "[T]he proposed ban would degrade readiness even more than the failed 'don't ask, don't tell' policy. Patriotic transgender Americans who are serving — and who want to serve — must not be dismissed, deprived of medically necessary health care, or forced to compromise their integrity or hide their identity."

Laverne Cox said, "This administration's ban on transgender service members will go into effect this Friday April 12, 2019. They have targeted trans people from the moment they took power."

The American Medical Association told the Associated Press in April 2019 that the memorandum mischaracterized transgender people as having a "deficiency".

Kirsten Gillibrand condemned Trump for the directive, saying, "A man who has never served has told men and women that their service is not worthy, based on their gender identity. I can't think of a more discriminatory, outrageous statement." Another Democratic politician, Steve Bullock, the governor of Montana, announced he would allow transgender Americans to serve in the military. Elizabeth Warren pledged to overturn military transgender ban on the first day of her presidency.

On March 18, 2019, Democratic 2020 nominee Cory Booker vowed to reverse Donald Trump's ban on transgender individuals serving in the military if elected.

During his 2020 presidential campaign, Mike Bloomberg pledged to reverse the ban on transgender individuals in the military.

In September 2020, Democratic nominee Joe Biden promised he would reverse the ban. When asked about "the rights of transgender people, banning them from military service" in a televised townhall on October 15, 2020, Biden replied, "I would just flat-out change the law. I would eliminated [Trump's] executive orders, number one."

=== Lawsuits ===
Four lawsuits challenging Directive-type Memorandum-19-004 yielded no judicial remedies:

- Jane Doe v. Trump
- Stone v. Trump
- Karnoski v. Trump
- Stockman v. Trump

The decision by the Supreme Court to stay preliminary injunctions in the cases Karnoski v. Trump and Stockman v. Trump suggested the justices would likely uphold the ban in a ruling.

=== House Resolution ===
On March 28, 2019, the House of Representatives passed H.Res. 124 with 238 yeas, 185 nays, 1 present, and 8 not voting. The resolution was a non-binding resolution expressing opposition to banning service in the Armed Forces by openly transgender individuals.

== Opinion polling ==
Date(s) conducted	Support ban	Oppose ban	Don't know / NA	Margin of error	Sample	Conducted by	Polling type
January 22, 2024 – January 27, 2024	28%	50%	22%	2.9%	2,000 U.S. adult citizens	YouGov Survey	Web-based interviews
January 22, 2024 – January 27, 2024	30%	47%	23%	2.9%	2,000 U.S. adult citizens	YouGov Survey	Web-based interviews
May 15, 2019 – May 30, 2019	26%	71%	2%	4%	1,017 adults	Gallup	Telephone
April 9, 2019 – April 20, 2019	32%	63%	5%	3.5%	1,100 adults	PRRI	Landline and cellphone
January 25, 2019 – February 16, 2019	24%	59%	8%	2%	8,823 adults	Reuters / Ipsos	Online
January 25, 2019 – January 28, 2019	22%	70%	8%	3.1%	1,004 voters	Quinnipiac University Poll	Online
January 25, 2019 – January 26, 2019	41%	59%		3.7%	1,000 registered voters	The Hill / HarrisX	Live interviewers call landlines and cell phones
January 22, 2019 – January 23, 2019	44%	43%		13%	1,000 registered voters	Rasmussen Reports	Likely voters
March 25, 2018 – March 27, 2018	34%	49%	17%	3.4%	1,500 adults	The Economist / YouGov Poll	Web-based interviews
March 25, 2018 – March 27, 2018	34%	48%	18%	3.4%	1,500 adults	The Economist / YouGov Poll	Web-based interviews
December 14, 2017 – December 17, 2017	23%	73%	5%	3.6%	1,001 adults	CNN / ssrs	Live interviewers call landlines and cell phones
August 2, 2017 – August 8, 2017	30%	64%	6%	2.7%	2,024 adults	PRRI	Landline and cellphone
July 27, 2017 – August 1, 2017	27%	68%	5%	3.4%	1,125 voters	Quinnipiac University Poll	Live interviewers call landlines and cell phones
July 27, 2017 – July 29, 2017	21%	68%	11%	2%	1,972 registered voters	Morning Consult National Tracking Poll	Online
July 26, 2017 – July 28, 2017	27%	58%	16%	3.2%	1,249 adults	IPSOS / REUTERS POLL DATA	Online
July 26, 2017 – January 27, 2017	44%	45%	11%	3%	1,000 registered voters	Rasmussen Reports	Likely voters

== Repeal and inclusion ==
On January 25, 2021, U.S. President Joe Biden signed Executive Order 14004, which ended the transgender military ban. Despite immediately revoking the 2017 and 2018 presidential memorandums which aided the instruction, the DoD is not required to repeal the Instruction until after holding consultation with the Joint Chiefs of Staff. The DoD announced gender inclusion at the end of March 2021. This reversal was later repealed by Executive Order 14183 on January 27, 2025 by President Donald Trump.

== See also ==
- Transgender personnel in the United States military
- Transgender inequality
