= Presidential Memorandum on Military Service by Transgender Individuals =

The Presidential Memorandum on Military Service by Transgender Individuals may refer to:

- Presidential Memorandum on Military Service by Transgender Individuals (2017)
- Presidential Memorandum on Military Service by Transgender Individuals (2018)
