= Stockman v. Trump =

Lawsuit filed on September 5, 2017

Stockman, et al v. Trump, et al
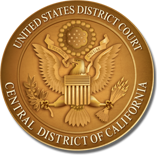
- Court: United States District Court for the Central District of California
- Decided: Case terminated on August 23, 2021
- Defendants: Donald Trump; James Mattis; Joseph Dunford; Richard Spencer; Ryan McCarthy; Heather Wilson; Elaine Duke
- Plaintiffs: Aiden Stockman; Nicholas Talbott; Tamasyn Reeves; Jaquice Tate; John Doe 1 John Doe 2 Jane Doe; Equality California
- Citations: 5:17-cv-01799-JGB-KKx (filed as 2:17-cv-06516)

Court membership
- Judges sitting: Jesus Bernal; Kenly Kiya Kato

Stockman v. Trump (5:17-cv-01799-JGB-KKx) is a lawsuit filed on September 5, 2017, in the United States District Court for the Central District of California. The suit, like the similar prior suits Jane Doe v. Trump, Stone v. Trump, and Karnoski v. Trump, sought to block Trump and top Pentagon officials from implementing the proposed ban on military service for transgender people under the auspices of the equal protection and Due Process Clause of the Fifth Amendment. The suit was filed on the behalf of four named and three anonymous transgender plaintiffs, including Nicholas Talbott, by Equality California (EQCA). Two other major LGBT-rights organizations which had filed Jane Doe v. Trump, GLBTQ Legal Advocates & Defenders (GLAD) and the National Center for Lesbian Rights, joined the suit as co-counsels in October 2017.

In addition to President Trump, the amended suit named as defendants the Secretaries of Defense (James Mattis), the Army (Ryan McCarthy, acting), the Navy (Richard Spencer), the Air Force (Heather Wilson), and Homeland Security (Elaine Duke).

== Background ==
Trump first announced a policy banning transgender people from serving in the military in "any capacity" in a series of tweets on July 26, 2017, stating that allowing such service members would incur "tremendous medical costs and disruption". The decision reversed Obama administration policy to allow the enlistment of transgender personnel, which was initially approved by the Department of Defense to begin July 1, but was delayed by Defense Secretary Mattis. Trump issued formal guidance on the ban to the Secretaries of Defense and Homeland Security in a memorandum on August 25, 2017.

== History ==
The complaint seeks an immediate injunction based on the Fifth Amendment, and in it, EQCA noted "the stated bases offered in support of Defendants' August 25 Directive are pretextual, arbitrary, capricious, and unsupported by facts, evidence, or analysis" and that "transgender people have been serving openly [since 2016] without incident or any negative impact upon military readiness, lethality, unit cohesion, or the national defense generally." On October 2, the Plaintiffs filed a motion for a preliminary injunction.

The United States Department of Justice Civil Division (USDOJ) filed a motion to dismiss on October 23, using the same arguments as previously filed in Jane Doe v. Trump and Stone v. Trump, which called the challenge "premature several times over" because "Plaintiffs are suffering no injury during the interim period" while Secretary Mattis's Interim Guidance of September 2017 was in effect during the six-month study period before submitting a recommendation for a final policy. The government also argued that Plaintiffs "may never be injured by the policy finally adopted".

NCLR and GLAD filed a response to the government's motion to dismiss on November 6, ahead of a November 20 hearing. In the response, the lawyers for the plaintiffs called the Interim Guidance a "red herring" and argued "the absence of any rational basis for the ban, its facial targeting of a disfavored group, and the highly unusual circumstances under which it was adopted lead to the inescapable inference that it is based on animus—discrimination for its own sake—and not on any legitimate military concerns." USDOJ replied to support dismissal on November 13, stating "[t]he [Presidential] Memorandum [of August 25] itself shows that Secretary Mattis has not been limited to studying only when and how transgender service members should be discharged and that the outcome of the study has not been predetermined" and "[t]he Doe Court's reliance on statements that the President made on Twitter several weeks before issuing his Memorandum is misplaced." USDOJ also argued "policymakers cannot bind their successors to a decision simply by conducting a study, and the rules of deference due the military are not tossed aside merely because current military officials are revisiting an issue that was studied by previous officials."

Four organizations filed amici briefs in late October and early November in support of the Plaintiffs: The Trevor Project; fourteen states and the District of Columbia; Transgender American Veterans Association, National Center for Transgender Equality, and other transgender interest organizations; and various health care organizations.

=== Related case developments ===
After Judge Kollar-Kotelly issued a preliminary injunction enjoining the Presidential Memorandum of August 25 from being enforced in the related case Jane Doe v. Trump on October 30, 2017, the Court in Stockman v. Trump issued an Order for Supplemental Briefing on November 1, which asked if Jane Doe affects the case at hand and whether the Court should stay Stockman as Jane Doe continues to proceed. The parties were ordered to file supplemental briefs no later than November 8. USDOJ supported the stay, while Plaintiffs opposed the stay. The hearing for the proposed stay was held on December 11, 2017.

=== Intervention by California ===
The State of California moved to intervene in the case on November 8, stating that "[i]f left unchallenged, the transgender military ban would impede the California National Guard's ability to recruit and retain members to protect the State's natural resources in times of need; force California to violate its anti-discrimination laws and discriminate against its own residents in staffing the California National Guard; and threaten the State's ability to safeguard its public institutions of higher education from discrimination in their ROTC programs." The motion to intervene also noted that President Trump's July 26 announcement via Twitter "was rendered without any significant analysis and lacks a rational basis." California also filed a motion to shorten time on November 8 in order to participate in the scheduled November 20 hearing. The Court granted the motion to shorten time on November 9, and stated that any opposing motions must be filed by November 14, and any supporting motions must be filed by November 16.

In their opposition to the motion to intervene filed on November 14, USDOJ argued "the military's longstanding policy restricting the accession of transgender persons has been in place for decades without challenge from California," questioning why California would choose to intervene now, especially two months after the lawsuit was originally filed. In its response on November 16, the State of California countered by noting "the military's historical discrimination against transgender individuals does not alter the fact that the current practice conflicts with California's antidiscrimination laws, which bar discrimination on the basis of sex" and "the Department of Defense's determination [published in the 2016 RAND report] that sound and competent evidence did not justify the ban, the military's historical discrimination does not negate California's interest in challenging the current, patently discriminatory policy". On November 16, California's motion to intervene was granted and the scheduled November 20 hearing was continued to December 11.

=== Preliminary injunction ===
Plaintiffs are "protected by the Fifth Amendment's Due Process Clause[, which] contains within it the prohibition against denying to any person the equal protection of the laws." [United States v. Windsor, 570 U.S. ___ (2013).] Consequently, the government must proffer a justification which is "exceedingly persuasive," "genuine," "not hypothesized," not "invented post hoc in response to litigation," and "must not rely on overbroad generalizations." [United States v. Virginia, 518 U.S. 515, 531 (1996).] Defendants' justifications do not pass muster. Their reliance on cost is unavailing, as precedent shows the ease of cost and administration not survive intermediate scrutiny even if it is significant. [Frontiero v. Richardson, 411 U.S. 677, 688–91 (1996).] Moreover, all the evidence in the record suggests the ban's cost savings to the government is minuscule. (RAND Report at 22–23.) Furthermore, Defendants' unsupported allegation that allowing transgender individuals to be in the military would adversely affect unit cohesion is similarly unsupported by the proffered evidence. (Compare MTD at 30–31 with RAND Report at 24.) These justifications fall far short of exceedingly persuasive.

— Judge Jesus Bernal, Order (December 22, 2017), Case 5:17-cv-01799-JGB-KK, Dkt. No. 79

On December 22, 2017, Judge Jesus Bernal was the fourth judge to grant a preliminary injunction against the policies of the Presidential Memorandum.

=== New Trump memorandum ===
On March 23, 2018, President Trump issued a new memorandum which revoked the prior memorandum of August 25, 2017, and allowed the Secretaries of Defense and Homeland Security to "exercise their authority to implement any appropriate policies concerning military service by transgender individuals." The USDOJ immediately filed a motion to dissolve the preliminary injunction, arguing the case was moot since President Trump had shifted responsibility for the proposed ban in the March 2018 memorandum: "If Plaintiffs fear future injury from the proposed new policy, which they have not challenged, those harms would stem from the independent action of the Secretaries of Defense and Homeland Security in implementing that policy, not the 2017 or 2018 Memoranda." In addition, USDOJ argued "The new policy, by contrast, contains several exceptions allowing some transgender individuals, including many Plaintiffs here, to serve, and it is the product of independent military judgment following an extensive study", citing the panel of authors responsible for the Department of Defense report attached to the Mattis memorandum, which had met 13 times in 90 days. USDOJ also argued the new policy was constitutional because it should be subject to highly deferential review rather than a stricter rational basis review. The new policy would disqualify "individuals with gender dysphoria who require or have undergone gender transition" and require that "service members generally serve in their biological sex" on the basis of unit cohesion, military readiness, cost, and fairness.

Counsel for the plaintiffs filed a motion to strike the motion to dissolve the preliminary injunction, noting the Defendants had violated Local Rule 7–3, which requires each side to meet and confer with the other side at least seven days before filing any motion. The two sides agreed to a schedule allowing responses to the motion to dissolve the preliminary injunction starting in late April. After briefing and oral argument, the court denied the motion on September 18, 2018, holding that "the new policy is essentially the same as the first policy ... Trump specifically announced that he was banning transgender people from the military. This second iteration of the policy continues to do exactly that."

The case was still pending in court as of January 25, 2021, when President Joe Biden issued an executive order revoking Trump's transgender ban. The district court terminated the case on August 23, 2021.

== See also ==
- List of lawsuits involving Donald Trump
- Transgender personnel in the United States military
- Executive Order 14168
- Executive Order 14183
- Jane Doe v. Trump
- Karnoski v. Trump
- Stone v. Trump
