= Doe v. Trump =

Doe v. Trump may refer to several civil law cases involving Donald Trump:

- Doe v. Trump (2016) (case 1:16-cv-07673-RA, United States District Court Southern District of New York, filed October 3, 2016), the child molestation charge tied to Jeffrey Epstein's Manhattan residence
- Jane Doe, John Doe, et.al. v. Trump (case 2:17-cv-00178-JLR, United States District Court for the Western District of Washington, filed February 7, 2017), a challenge to the ban on travelers from predominantly Muslim countries
- Doe v. Trump (2017) (case 1:17-cv-01597-CKK, United States District Court for the District of Columbia, filed August 28, 2017), a challenge to the ban on transgender military personnel
