= Gender Justice League =

- Established: 2012
- Location: 1122 E. Pike St. #969 Seattle, Washington 98122
- Executive Director: Danni Askini
- Website: www.genderjusticeleague.org

Gender Justice League (GJL) is an advocacy group for transgender, genderqueer, nonbinary, and gender non-conforming individuals in Washington State in the United States. The group advocates for transgender legal, political, and medical rights as well as participating in protests, community support, awareness raising, and fundraising events.

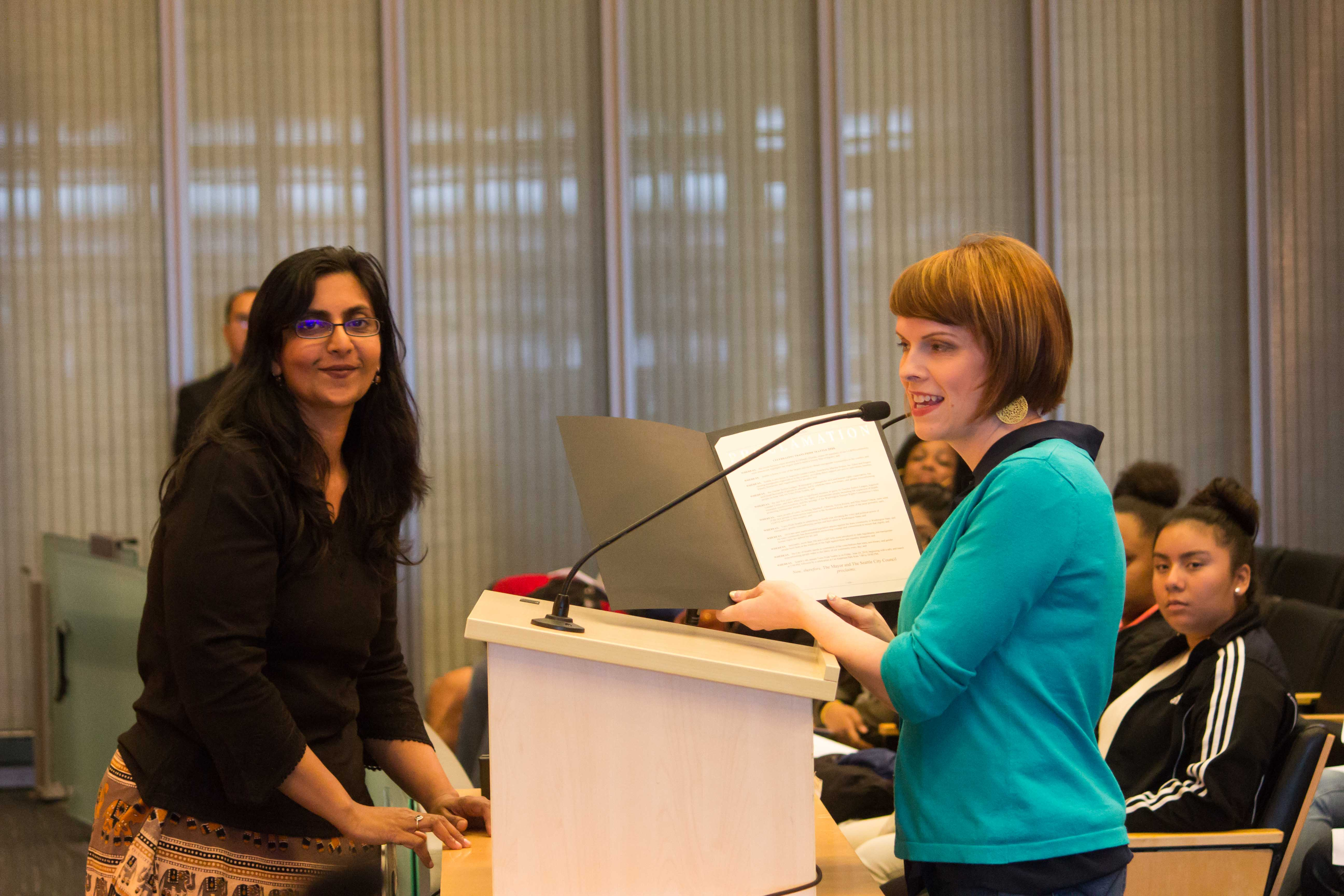
Seattle councilwoman Kshama Sawant (left) declaring "Trans Pride Day" with GJL director Danni Askini

== History ==
Gender Justice League was founded in 2012 by transgender activists and allies. In 2013 they organized the first Trans Pride Seattle, which has since taken place annually in June.

== Focuses ==
=== Community Security Program ===
Gender Justice League's Community Security Program provides safety planning, resource navigation, and financial assistance services to transgender and gender diverse people who have experienced gender-based violence in Washington State.

=== Legal discrimination ===
==== Public Accommodation ====
One focus of Gender Justice League is curbing legislation that prohibits transgender individuals from using the bathroom that aligns with their gender identity rather than their sex assigned at birth, otherwise known as bathroom bills. Washington currently has a law that protects transgender individual's rights in public bathrooms, but GJL's activists are concerned about petitions that are trying to get rid of these laws and legal initiatives to overrule them.

==== Name changes ====
Gender Justice League has held legal clinics to help transgender individuals legally change their names. These clinics were specifically held between November 2016 and January 2017, due to the group's fear that newly elected president Donald Trump might revoke transgender individual's ability to legally change their names once he was inaugurated. These clinics invited volunteers from various LGBTQ+ law organizations to do pro bono work, and the clinics served as many as 200 individuals. A problem arose, however, as the Gender Justice League wanted to provide money to those trying to change their names, but were unable to due to their tax status. GJL organized with King County to be able to give individuals seeking a name change the money to do so without forfeiting their nonprofit status.

==== Military service ====
In 2017 Lambda Legal and OutServe-SLDN filed a lawsuit on behalf of Gender Justice League against President Donald Trump and the U.S. Department of Defense over the transgender military ban, proposed by Trump on July 26, 2017.

In 2025, the Human Rights Campaign Foundation and Lambda Legal Defense and Education Fund filed a federal lawsuit against the Trump administration, challenging the constitutionality of Executive Order 14183, the transgender military ban. The case, Human Rights Campaign Foundation & Lambda Legal v. Trump, represents six actively serving transgender service members, one transgender individual seeking to enlist, and the GJL.

=== Political activism ===
==== Seattle politics ====
Gender Justice League supports various political causes within the city of Seattle, not all of which are strictly related to transgender issues. GJL has also supported other efforts within the city, including bills that strengthen tenant's rights.

Kshama Sawant was the recipient of a Gender Justice Award in 2015 for her political activism supporting transgender individuals. Sawant has also donated money from her "solidarity fund" to GJL, citing their efforts to help transgender individuals as the reason for her donation.

==== Washington state politics ====
Gender Justice League is active in influencing Washington State politics. They have had an impact in organizing against bills that they believe would harm transgender individuals in Washington, including Washington Senate Bill 6443 and state ballot initiatives 1515 (2016) and 1552 (2017).

== Events ==
=== Trans Pride Seattle ===
Gender Justice League organizes the annual Trans Pride Seattle, an event that is very similar to a Gay Pride Parade. The event was first organized in 2013, a year after the organization was founded. The 2016 event drew upwards of 5,000 participants. Members of Gender Justice League claim that the event is a necessary space for transgender individuals and their allies to form community and overcome isolation.

=== Gender Justice Awards ===
Gender Justice League holds an annual awards ceremony called the Gender Justice Awards, in which they celebrate individuals who have supported the transgender community.

=== Solidarity Music Festival ===
In 2016, Gender Justice League helped organize the Solidarity Music Festival as a form of anti-capitalist protest.
