= Trans Pride Seattle =

Transgender event in Seattle, Washington, United States

- Status: Active
- Locations: Seattle, Washington, U.S.
- Website: transprideseattle.org

Trans Pride Seattle is a pride march, arts and cultural festival, and resource fair advocating for transgender rights during LGBT Pride weekend in Seattle, Washington, United States.

== History ==
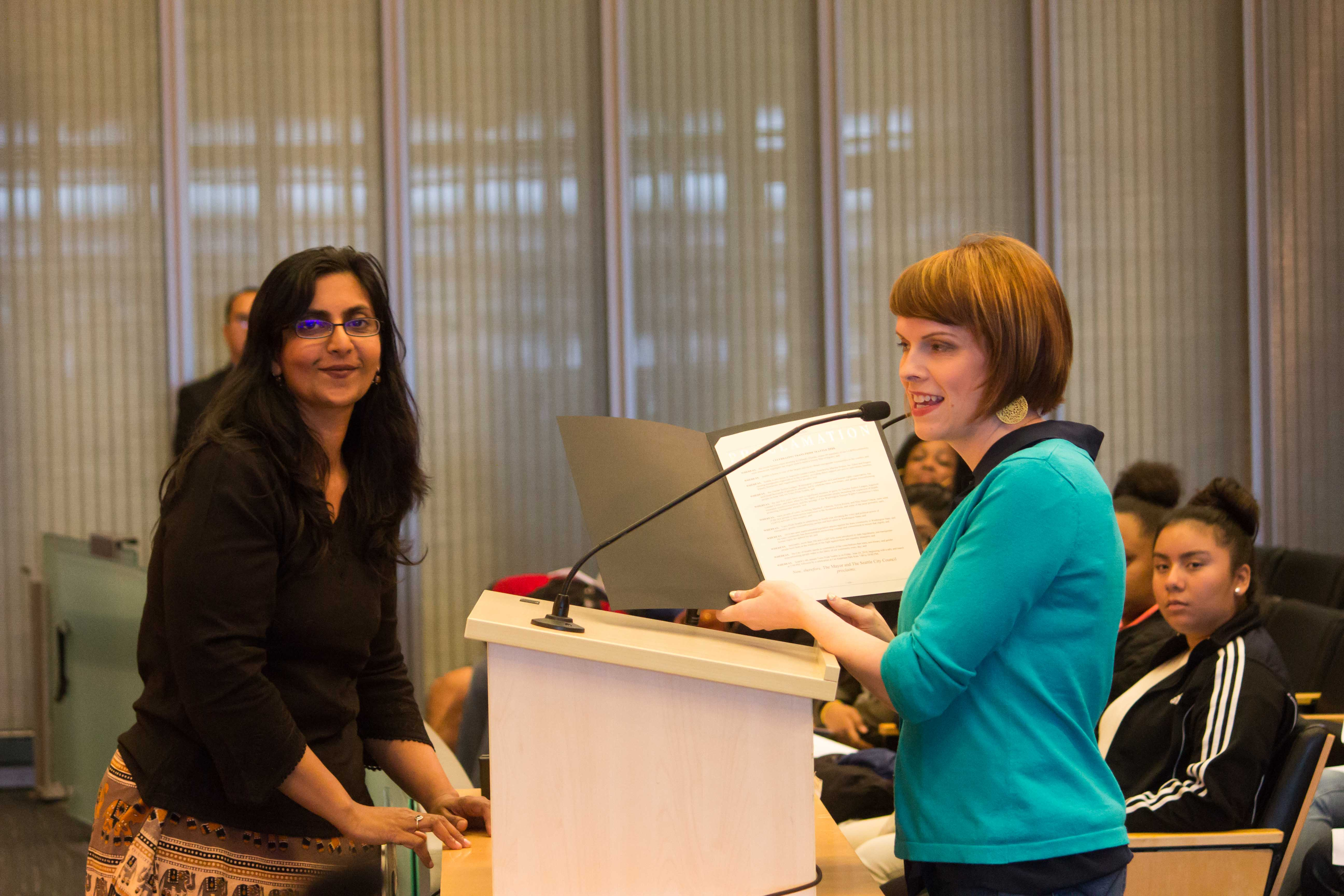
CM Sawant declaring "Trans Pride Day" with Danni Askini, 2016

Trans Pride Seattle was first founded in 1997 as a march and protest in Capitol Hill. It was revived 16 years later by Gender Justice League on June 23, 2013, in Cal Anderson Park.

In 2022, the group was forced to decide between holding the trans rights march unofficially or registering the protest with the city beforehand which would result in a police presence at the march. The group chose to stop the marches entirely and other groups have taken over the march in an unofficial and unaffiliated capacity.

The pride has grown to tens of thousands of attendees. In 2024 they required attendees to wear masks, and had ASL interpreters for the stage events. They also live streamed the events for those who may be unable to attend.
