= Presidential Memorandum on Military Service by Transgender Individuals (2018) =

Presidential memorandum

- Presidential Memorandum for the Secretary of Defense and the Secretary of Homeland Security Regarding Military Service by Transgender Individuals
- President: Donald Trump
- Signed: March 23, 2018

Federal Register details
- Federal Register document number: 2018-06426
- Publication date: March 28, 2018
- Document citation: 13367

Summary
- Military service by transgender individuals

The Presidential Memorandum for the Secretary of Defense and the Secretary of Homeland Security Regarding Military Service by Transgender Individuals is the 43rd presidential memorandum signed by U.S. President Donald Trump on March 23, 2018.

The memorandum:

- Revokes the Presidential Memorandum for the Secretary of Defense and the Secretary of Homeland Security.
- The United States Secretary of Defense and United States Secretary of Homeland Security may exercise their authority to implement any appropriate policies concerning military service by transgender individuals.

On April 13, 2018, the policy was stayed when a federal district court ruled that the 2018 memorandum essentially repeated the same issues as its predecessor order from 2017, that transgender service members (and transgender individuals as a class) were a protected class entitled to strict scrutiny of adverse laws (or at worst, a quasi-suspect class), and ordered that matter continue to a full trial hearing on the legality of the proposed policy.

On January 25, 2021, Trump's successor Joe Biden signed an executive order revoking this memorandum.

== Enactment ==
On March 23, 2018, Maj. David Eastburn, a Pentagon spokesman, told the Washington Blade that the “DOD will still comply with federal court rulings and continue to assess and retain transgender service members,”. On March 24, 2018, Eastburn said that, given ongoing lawsuits and court rulings on the issue, there would "likely be no immediate impact on transgender service." The Memorandum for Sector Commanders, Battalion Commanders, MEPS Commanders, Directors, and Special Staff Officers, issued December 8, 2017, enacted a policy guidance to recruits to explain how to enlist transgender individuals and states that the memorandum “shall remain in effect until expressly revoked.” On April 18, 2018, Commandant Paul F. Zukunft told the United States House Appropriations Subcommittee on Homeland Security that the United States Coast Guard would continue to allow transgender members to serve unless specific legislation is passed banning them. On February 6, 2019, Maj. Gen. Matthew Beevers, the assistant adjutant general for the California National Guard, told the California Assembly Veterans Affairs Committee that the California National Guard would not remove transgender soldiers and airmen from its ranks.

== Lawsuits ==
There are four lawsuits involving the policy:

- Jane Doe v. Trump
- Stone v. Trump
- Karnoski v. Trump
- Stockman v. Trump

On April 13, 2018, the policy was stayed in Karnoski vs. Trump (Western District of Washington), when the court ruled that the 2018 memorandum essentially repeated the same issues as its predecessor order from 2017, that transgender service members (and transgender individuals as a class) were a protected class entitled to strict scrutiny of adverse laws (or at worst, a quasi-suspect class), and ordered that matter continue to a full trial hearing on the legality of the proposed policy. The government petitioned the US Supreme Court in November 2018 to reverse the stay while the cases are pending. The Court, in a 5–4 order along ideological lines issued in January 2019, agreed to lift the stay while they continued to deliberate on the merits of the cases.

== Repeal ==
On January 25, 2021, President Joe Biden held a meeting with Secretary of Defense Lloyd Austin and afterwards signed an executive order which lifted the transgender military ban.

On January 27, 2025, President Donald Trump issued Executive Order 14183. The executive order declares that identification with a gender different from one's assigned sex "conflicts with a soldier's commitment to an honorable, truthful, and disciplined lifestyle, even in one's personal life" and that the use of preferred pronouns along these lines compromises the government's ability to "establish high standards for troop readiness, lethality, cohesion, honesty, humility, uniformity, and integrity".

== See also ==
- 2025 Executive Order 14183
- Transgender people and military service
- Sexual orientation and gender identity in military service
- Sexual orientation and gender identity in the United States military
