= Nicholas Talbott =

American military officer

Personal details
- Born: 1993 or 1994 (age 32–33) Lisbon, Ohio, U.S.
- Education: Kent State University
- Occupation: Military officer

Military service
- Branch/service: United States Army Reserve
- Rank: Second lieutenant

Nicholas Talbott is an American Army Reserve officer and transgender rights activist. He is best known for the legal battles he has fought to remain in the military, specifically in the 2017 case Stockman v. Trump and the 2025 case Talbott v. Trump.

== Biography ==
Nicholas Talbott was born and raised in Lisbon, Ohio, on a family farm, and realized he was transgender at a young age. He came out to his mother at 15, and began transitioning by 18. He stated that "not a single person was surprised." He fully transitioned medically in 2012.

He majored in sociology and criminology from Kent State University, and dreamed of becoming an enlisted officer in the military. When the ban on transgender soldiers was lifted, he was informed by his recruiter that he should wait a year and then apply. He worked as a substitute teacher and truck driver during this time.

When he was informed that the ban was reinstated during the first presidency of Donald Trump, he became one of the plaintiffs suing in the case later known as Stockman v. Trump. He stated the reasoning provided, medical costs, was "a molehill that anyone who opposes transgender military service is trying to turn into a mountain", and that "Everyone has medical costs". He also studied global security and counterterrorism in Kent State during this time.

He was able to enlist after the ban was lifted by Joe Biden, and was named Honor Graduate at basic combat training. He has stated that when his sergeant asked him why he enlisted, he stated "I'm here because I'm transgender, and I want to prove that people like me can do this. And frankly, can do it better..." He was sworn in as a second lieutenant and served as a platoon leader in military police.

However, early in the second presidency of Donald Trump, a policy was put in place by the president and Secretary of Defense Pete Hegseth to remove all transgender troops. Talbott became the lead plaintiff in Talbott v. Trump, which sought to challenge this claim, stating "I just worked so hard to get my dream job... nothing should preclude us from service" and commenting that he believes "when one door closes in front of me, I look for another door to open up." Both the trial court and the court of appeals ruled that the government had shown insufficient evidence to show any harm besides the "desire to harm a politically unpopular group", and struck down the policy for Talbott and his co-plaintiffs.

He was named to the Out100 in 2025.
