= Karnoski v. Trump =

Lawsuit filed on August 29, 2017

Karnoski, et al v. Trump, et al
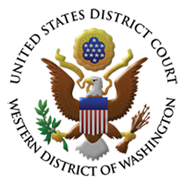
- Court: United States District Court for the Western District of Washington
- Decided: Case terminated on September 22, 2021
- Defendants: Donald Trump; In capacity as President of the United States; James Mattis (now removed); In capacity as Secretary of Defense; Mark Esper (replacing Mattis); In capacity as Secretary of Defense; Kirstjen Nielsen (now removed); In capacity as Secretary of Homeland Security; Kevin McAleenan (replacing Nielsen, now removed) in capacity as acting Secretary of Homeland Security; Chad Wolf (replacing McAleenan) in capacity as acting Secretary of Homeland Security; United States Department of Defense; United States Department of Homeland Security
- Plaintiffs: Ryan Karnoski; Cathrine Schmid; Laura Garza (on behalf of D.L., a minor); Lindsey Muller; Terece Lewis; Phillip Stephens; Megan Winters; Jane Doe; Conner Callahan; Human Rights Campaign; Gender Justice League; American Military Partner Association
- Citation: 2:17-cv-01297-MJP

Court membership
- Judge sitting: Marsha J. Pechman

Karnoski v. Trump (2:17-cv-01297-MJP) was a lawsuit filed on August 29, 2017, in the United States District Court for the Western District of Washington. The suit, like the similar suits Jane Doe v. Trump, Stone v. Trump, and Stockman v. Trump, sought to block Trump and top Pentagon officials from implementing the proposed ban on military service for transgender people under the auspices of the equal protection and Due Process Clause of the Fifth Amendment. The suit was filed on the behalf of three transgender plaintiffs, the Human Rights Campaign, and the Gender Justice League by Lambda Legal and OutServe-SLDN.

In addition to President Trump, the amended suit named as defendants the Secretary of Defense (originally James Mattis, later Mark Esper), Secretary of Homeland Security (originally Kirstjen Nielsen, then Kevin McAleenan, then Chad Wolf), the United States Department of Defense, and the United States Secretary of Homeland Security.

On January 25, 2021, President Biden issued an executive order lifting the ban on transgender military service. The court terminated the case on September 22, 2021.

== Background ==
Trump first announced a policy banning transgender people from serving in the military in "any capacity" in a series of tweets on July 26, 2017, stating that allowing such service members would incur "tremendous medical costs and disruption". The decision reversed Obama administration policy to allow the enlistment of transgender personnel, which was initially approved by the Department of Defense to begin July 1, but was delayed by Defense Secretary Mattis. Trump issued formal guidance on the ban to the Secretaries of Defense and Homeland Security in a memorandum on August 25, 2017.

== History ==
The complaint sought an immediate injunction based on the First and Fifth Amendments, and described the ban on transgender service as "[d]ripping with animus" and "unsupported by any compelling, important, or even rational justification". Under the Fifth Amendment, the Due Process Clause protects against unequal treatment by the federal government and protects against the deprivation "of life, liberty, and property"; and under the First Amendment, the ban on transgender service was stated to violate the plaintiffs' rights to free expression and association. The suit was amended on September 14, 2017, to add six more transgender personnel and the American Military Partner Association to the list of plaintiffs.

The State of Washington filed a motion to intervene in the case "to protect its quasi-sovereign, proprietary, and sovereign interests from a policy that unconstitutionally targets transgender Washingtonians" on September 25, 2017. The Court granted the motion to intervene in an Order issued November 27, 2017.

=== Defendant motions to dismiss and stay ===
The United States Department of Justice Civil Division (USDOJ) filed a motion to dismiss on October 16, 2017, repeating arguments made in similar motions to dismiss for the related suits Jane Doe v. Trump, Stone v. Trump, and Stockman v. Trump. In the motion to dismiss, USDOJ called the challenge "premature several times over", asserting the Presidential Memorandum of August 25 merely ordered further studies and no policy changes would be implemented before March 18. In addition, USDOJ argued Secretary Mattis's Interim Guidance of September 14 prevented the involuntary discharge of any Service member on the basis of transgender status, and would continue to provide medical treatment to Service members who were diagnosed with gender dysphoria. Several days after the preliminary injunction was granted in Doe v. Trump, the Plaintiffs filed an opposing motion replying to the motion to dismiss, stating "The government's defense is most notable for what it lacks: factual support to justify the Ban. Instead, Defendants assert that courts must defer to the military in military affairs. But it is difficult to imagine a situation where the extraordinary deference sought by the government would be less appropriate than here, where the President has discarded the military's own considered judgment without any factual support for doing so." USDOJ filed a response in support of dismissal on November 9, again asserting that since the issue was still being studied, "it remains uncertain whether Plaintiffs will suffer a cognizable injury caused by the military's future policy."

On November 7, USDOJ filed a motion requesting a stay of proceedings, arguing "this Court should stay further proceedings in this case while the preliminary injunction in Doe remains in place", referring to the October 30 Order by Judge Kollar-Kotelly in Jane Doe v. Trump providing a preliminary injunction to the implementation of the Presidential Memorandum. Both the State of Washington and the Plaintiffs filed motions opposing the stay on November 9. The motion to stay was denied on November 11.

=== Preliminary injunction ===
Not only did the DoD previously conclude that allowing transgender individuals to serve openly would not impact military effectiveness and readiness, the working group tasked to evaluate the issue also concluded that prohibiting open service would have negative impacts including loss of qualified personnel, erosion of unit cohesion, and erosion of trust in command.

...

The Court concludes that the policy set forth in the Presidential Memorandum constitutes [a governmental intrusion upon a fundamental liberty interest]. The policy directly interferes with Plaintiffs' ability to define and express their gender identity, and penalizes Plaintiffs for exercising their fundamental right to do so openly by depriving them of employment and career opportunities.

...

The policy penalizes transgender service members—but not others—for disclosing their gender identity, and is therefore a content-based restriction. Even giving the government the benefit of a more deferential standard of review under Brown, 444 U.S. at 355, the policy does not survive.

— Judge Marsha J. Pechman, Order, Case 17-cv-01297-MJP (December 11, 2017)

On December 11, 2017, Judge Marsha J. Pechman issued a preliminary injunction blocking the Presidential Memorandum of August 25, stating the "Defendants have failed to demonstrate that the policy prohibiting transgender individuals from serving openly is substantially related to important government interests" and "the prohibition on military service by transgender individuals was announced by President Trump on Twitter, abruptly and without any evidence of considered reason or deliberation. (See Dkt. No. 30 at ¶¶ 172-184.) The policy is therefore not entitled to Rostker deference," referring to Rostker v. Goldberg, 453 U.S. 57 (1981). The Order granted in part the Defendants' motion to dismiss as the Plaintiffs' Amended Complaint had not properly plead the procedural due process claim, but the Order also denied the other claims in the motion to dismiss and granted the motion for preliminary injunction in full.

=== Appeals ===
On December 14, 2017, USDOJ filed a notice declaring its intent to appeal the preliminary injunction. A Motion for Clarification and partial stay was filed the next day asking the same questions as the motion for emergency stay with the 9th Circuit. Both the plaintiffs and State of Washington filed opposition briefs to the Motion for Clarification on December 27, 2017. Judge Pechman rejected the appeal on December 29, writing that "Secretary Mattis does not have authority to effectuate an unconstitutional policy, and certainly not one which has been enjoined" and "Defendants have provided no evidence that the accessions criteria for transgender enlistees are any more complex or burdensome than the criteria for non-transgender enlistees."

Meanwhile, USDOJ also filed a motion for an emergency stay with the 9th Circuit on December 15, 2017. In the motion, USDOJ made similar arguments as those filed earlier in December before the 4th Circuit (in Stone v. Trump) and D.C. Circuit (in Jane Doe v. Trump), namely either that Secretary Mattis could exercise his independent authority to implement a further delay on accession of transgender candidates, or that the injunction could be narrowly restricted to allow the accession only of the Plaintiffs found to have standing. The Plaintiffs and the State of Washington filed opposing motions on December 19, 2017, stating "the constitutional defects in the accession ban cannot be cured by merely having another government official re-authorize its extension, even if acting on a supposedly independent basis" and noting that "[t]hough the first ruling was over six weeks ago, Defendants waited until late last week to seek an emergency stay. In the meantime, Defendants issued detailed guidance to the military on how to comply with the court rulings, guidance that will come as no surprise given that the military has been preparing to allow accession of transgender individuals for 18 months." In the reply to support the motion to dismiss filed on December 20, USDOJ argued that "Plaintiffs cannot plausibly characterize as irrational the current accession policy—a rule that, until 2016, was upheld by military leadership under every president for decades. The mere fact that this policy was revised by former-Secretary Carter cannot foreclose Secretary Mattis and President Trump from reconsidering its validity." The day after Judge Pechman rejected the motion for clarification, USDOJ applied to withdraw their appeal with the 9th Circuit, which was granted.

=== Summary judgment ===
On January 25, 2018, the Plaintiffs moved for summary judgment, arguing that "this Court concluded that the Ban was unsupported by any adequate justification; indeed, it also found that the proffered justifications were contradicted by the extant evidence, including the military's own comprehensive review. Defendants cannot rectify this deficiency with post hoc factual support that could not have actually motivated President Trump's decision because it did not exist when the decision was made. Instead, the Ban must be measured against the state of affairs that existed on July 26, 2017—and this Court has already confirmed that the Ban fails any level of constitutional scrutiny when examined against that record." The State of Washington also filed a motion for summary judgment, noting "Defendants have simply presented no evidence whatsoever that military readiness and unit cohesion are actually put at risk by open service by transgender service members" and "the challenged policy undermines the important governmental interest purportedly served by the discriminatory policy."

In their reply, USDOJ challenged the motion for summary judgment as the discovery process for the declarants in support of the motion were scheduled for mid-to-late March, saying the "lack of a fair opportunity to test these asserted facts [the "Statement of Undisputed Fact" in the original motion] will necessarily hinter Defendants' efforts to oppose Plaintiffs' and intervenor's summary judgment motions." The Plaintiffs noted that USDOJ had "significant advance notice" prior to the filing of the motion for summary judgment, but "Defendants took no steps to obtain any discovery whatsoever in the two months before their opposition deadline." The State of Washington, as the Intervenor, wrote "the Rule 56(d) request appears to be a strategy to buy time until defendants can finalize and produce the new "study" that they hope will provide the missing support for the Ban." On February 21, Judge Pechman denied the USDOJ motion to continue the motion for summary judgment, and ordered USDOJ to file any opposition to the motion for summary judgment within seven days.

The next day, the Plaintiffs filed a motion to compel initial disclosures from the Defendants, asking the Court to force the Defendants to identify the individuals, documents, and information that would be used to support their defense. On July 27, the court granted the motion to compel, and denied the defendants' motion for a protective order.

=== New Trump memorandum ===
Meanwhile, Donald Trump issued a new Presidential Memorandum on March 23, 2018. On March 29, the defendants moved to dissolve the preliminary injunction, contending that any deficiencies in the original 2017 memorandum were now moot, and that the new policy was constitutional. The motion argued: "Far from a categorical ban based on transgender status, this new policy, like the Carter policy before it, would turn on the medical condition of gender dysphoria and contains a nuanced set of exceptions allowing some transgender individuals, including many Plaintiffs here, to serve." The court denied the motion on April 13, 2018, holding that "Each of the claims ... remains viable," and that "because transgender people have long been subjected to systemic oppression and forced to live in silence, they are a protected class. ... This means that before Defendants can implement the Ban, they must show that it was sincerely motivated by compelling interests, rather than by prejudice or stereotype, and that it is narrowly tailored to achieve those interests."

=== Further appeals ===
On April 30, 2018, the defendants filed a notice of appeal to the United States Court of Appeals for the Ninth Circuit, along with a motion to stay the injunction and allow the ban to go into effect while their appeal was pending. A few days later on May 4, the defendants also asked the 9th Circuit for a stay pending appeal. Judge Pechman denied the stay on June 15, and the 9th Circuit denied the stay on July 19. The appellate court heard oral argument on October 10, 2018.

On November 7, the defendants petitioned the Supreme Court of the United States, asking the Court to accept the case for review immediately, without waiting for the 9th Circuit to decide their appeal. The Supreme Court denied the petition on January 22, 2019, but issued a 5-4 order, split along ideological lines, that lifted the stay on the order while Karnoski and the related cases were still being deliberated.

On June 14, 2019, the Ninth Circuit Court issued a decision unanimously holding that the administration's ban targeted transgender people. Nevertheless, the Ninth Circuit vacated the district court's ruling, holding that the differences between the 2017 and 2018 memoranda were sufficiently "significant" that the lower court was required to consider the 2018 memorandum separately.

The case was still pending in the district court as of January 25, 2021, when President Joe Biden issued an executive order revoking Trump's transgender ban. The district court terminated the case on September 22, 2021.

== See also ==
- List of lawsuits involving Donald Trump
- Transgender personnel in the United States military
- Jane Doe v. Trump
- Stone v. Trump
- Stockman v. Trump
