= Stone v. Trump =

Lawsuit filed on August 28, 2017

Stone, et al v. Trump, et al
- Court: United States District Court for the District of Maryland
- Decided: Pending (filed August 28, 2017)
- Defendants: Donald Trump; James Mattis; Ryan McCarthy; Richard Spencer; Heather Wilson
- Plaintiffs: Brock Stone; Kate Cole; Theodore D’Atri; Seven Ero George; Teagan Gilbert; Tommie Parker; ACLU of Maryland; John Doe
- Citation: 1:17-cv-02459-MJG

Court membership
- Judge sitting: Marvin J. Garbis

Stone v. Trump (1:17-cv-02459-MJG) was a lawsuit filed on August 28, 2017, in the United States District Court for the District of Maryland. The lawsuit alleged that President Donald Trump's ban on transgender personnel joining the U.S. military violated their equal protection and due process rights. The American Civil Liberties Union (ACLU) of Maryland filed the suit on behalf of Petty Officer First Class Brock Stone, an 11-year veteran of the U.S. Navy, and several other transgender service members. In addition to President Trump, the suit named as defendants the Secretaries of Defense (James Mattis), the Army (Ryan McCarthy, acting), the Navy (Richard Spencer), and the Air Force (Heather Wilson).

== Background ==
Trump first announced a policy banning transgender people from serving in the military in "any capacity" in a series of tweets on July 26, 2017, stating that allowing such service members would incur "tremendous medical costs and disruption". The decision reversed Obama administration policy to allow the enlistment of transgender personnel, which was initially approved by the Department of Defense to begin July 1, but was delayed by Defense Secretary Mattis. Trump issued formal guidance on the ban to the Secretaries of Defense and Homeland Security in a memorandum on August 25, 2017.

== History ==
The initial complaint was filed on August 28, 2017, in the United States District Court for the District of Maryland on behalf of five named and one anonymous transgender personnel either currently serving on active duty or in the National Guard. The complaint cited news articles that "indicate that President Trump's motivations in abruptly announcing a transgender ban were largely political, reflecting a desire to placate legislators and advisers who bear animus and moral disapproval toward men and women who are transgender" and further stated there was "no evidence that this about-face in policy was supported by any study of the issue or any consultation with military officers, DoD [Department of Defense] officials, other military experts, or medical or legal experts".

An amended complaint was filed on September 14, noting that one of the named plaintiffs, Staff Sergeant Kate Cole, had been denied medically indicated surgery on September 8. That same day, the Plaintiffs filed a motion for preliminary injunction. In the attached memorandum in support, the Plaintiffs noted that "President Trump’s asserted military justifications have already been studied at length and rejected by the military itself. The Ban reflects a decision to single out a disfavored group and withdraw legal protection based not on evidence but animus, moral disapproval, and crass political calculation." The memorandum also argued that "each day that President Trump’s unconstitutional directive remains in effect, Plaintiffs and their families continue to grapple with the stress and uncertainty of having their careers, their livelihoods, and their medical care jeopardized by a Commander-in-Chief who rejects their service and their sacrifice."

The United States Department of Justice Civil Division (USDOJ) filed a motion to dismiss on October 12, 2017, calling the request for a preliminary injunction "premature several times over" as Secretary Mattis's Interim Guidance of September 14, 2017 would prevent involuntary discharge, separation, or denied re-enlistment at least until March 2018. Senior medical and commanding officers provided sworn statements that they would comply with the Interim Guidance, in support of USDOJ's arguments.

In response, the plaintiffs' attorneys filed an opposing motion on October 27, 2017, which noted the Presidential Memorandum of August 25, 2017 prohibited the accession (enlistment and commissioning) of transgender people into the military as of January 1, 2018, the funding of "sex-reassignment surgical procedures for military personnel" would cease on March 23, 2018, and the Secretary of Defense was directed to "return to the longstanding policy and practice on military service" which required involuntary discharge of personnel solely on the basis of their transgender status, also on March 23. Three separate amici briefs were filed in support of the complaint, by The Trevor Project (October 26), retired military officers (October 27/corrected October 30), and the same fourteen states and the District of Columbia which had collectively filed an earlier, similar brief in Doe v. Trump (October 30). On November 3, the government filed a motion in support of their earlier motion to dismiss, stating the Presidential Memorandum of August 25 "specifically directs the Secretary of Defense to study how to address transgender individuals who are currently serving in the military and does not predetermine the outcome of that study" and the "reliance on statements that the President made on Twitter several weeks before issuing his Presidential Memorandum is misplaced."

During this time, Judge Kollar-Kotelly issued a partial preliminary injunction to the proposed ban in Doe v. Trump on October 30. For Stone v. Trump, the Plaintiffs filed a memorandum on October 31, asking to continue consideration of the preliminary injunction as several of the plaintiffs in this case were affected by the ban on medically necessary surgeries implemented by the Presidential Memorandum of August 25. USDOJ argued on November 7 the preliminary injunction in Doe v. Trump "has, in large measure, provided Plaintiffs with the remedy that they seek at this stage" and "[t]his Court should therefore stay all proceedings".

=== Preliminary injunction ===
President Trump’s tweets did not emerge from a policy review, nor did the Presidential Memorandum identify any policymaking process or evidence demonstrating that the revocation of transgender rights was necessary for any legitimate national interest. [...] Moreover, the Court finds that, based on the exhibits and declarations currently on the record, the Directives are unlikely to survive a rational review. The lack of any justification for the abrupt policy change, combined with the discriminatory impact to a group of our military service members who have served our country capably and honorably, cannot possibly constitute a legitimate governmental interest.

— Judge Marvin J. Garbis, Stone v. Trump, F.Supp.3d 747, 768

On November 21, 2017, Judge Marvin J. Garbis issued a preliminary injunction to the entire Presidential Memorandum of August 25. Judge Garbis's order also blocks the prohibition on gender reassignment surgery, going further than Judge Kollar-Kotelly's October 2017 injunction in the related case Doe v. Trump. In the order, Judge Garbis wrote "A capricious, arbitrary, and unqualified tweet of new policy does not trump the methodical and systematic review by military stakeholders qualified to understand the ramifications of policy changes", referring to the July tweets by President Trump announcing the reinstatement of the ban, which had caught Pentagon leadership by surprise and drew swift condemnation from senior retired officers.

=== Appeals ===
USDOJ filed a notice of appeal on December 5. USDOJ also asked the Court to clarify on December 12 if Secretary Mattis retained independent authority to further delay the accession (the process of entering military service, whether through enlistment, Service Academy, ROTC, or similar programs) of transgender candidates. Under the status quo enforced by the preliminary injunction, accession of transgender candidates was set to start on January 1, 2018. This date resulted from the postponement by Secretary Mattis of six months after the initial deadline of July 1, 2017 under the accession plan proposed by Secretary Carter in 2016. USDOJ asked for the clarification to be issued by noon, December 14. The parties had a conference on December 13, confirming that discovery should conclude by April 24, 2018, and the trial or hearing would be held in July 2018.

On December 14, USDOJ filed an emergency motion for a stay on Judge Garbis's order with the Fourth Circuit. The emergency motion used similar language to the emergency motion filed on December 11 with the D.C. Circuit in Doe v. Trump. Both appeal court motions asked for a stay that would allow Secretary Mattis to issue a second delay for accession of transgender candidates to military service. Alternatively, the stay could act to narrowly constrain the preliminary injunction to allow the accession of only Seven Ero George, the single Plaintiff in Stone v. Trump that Judge Garbis ruled had standing to challenge the ban on accessions. Plaintiffs filed their opposition to the emergency motion on December 18, stating "[i]t was the President's unconstitutional actions that ended an orderly process [of planned accession]" and "[defendants did] not explain why the months of training that have already occurred are insufficient, or offer an explanation of what training they believe remains necessary and how long it would take." In support, USDOJ stated "that implementation [of accession] was put on hold on August 25, 2017" and "the military will still have to take significant steps in order to meet an unexpected January 1 deadline".

Plaintiffs followed up with a memorandum of supplemental authority on December 19 after the Pentagon memorandum of December 8 outlining guidance for accession of transgender candidates was introduced in Karnoski v. Trump. USDOJ argued "Secretary Mattis cannot, without risking contempt, exercise his independent authority to give the military more time to consider a momentous change to its accession standards" and produced a follow-up memorandum, dated December 19.

On December 21, 2017, a panel of three judges on the Fourth Circuit denied USDOJ's emergency motion for a stay on Judge Garbis's order. Judge Garbis also denied the Motion for Clarification and Partial Stay on December 28, noting the defendants were "request[ing] judicial advice as to what can be done to delay transgender accession to the military that will not risk a contempt finding" and they also had "not met their burden to establish irreparable harm if they must implement the accessions provision by January 1, 2018". USDOJ filed a motion to withdraw the appeal, which was granted on February 2, 2018.

=== Discovery ===
On January 26, 2018, the Plaintiffs filed a motion to compel initial disclosures, which was granted on February 6. In their motion, the Plaintiffs stated the "Defendants’ two-sentence “initial disclosure” contains none of the required identifications, and is tantamount to no disclosure at all" instead of identifying the individuals, documents, and information that may be used to support their defense. Both sides entered into an agreement to enable confidential documents to be designated as privileged and protected from public disclosure on February 12.

As in Doe v. Trump, USDOJ moved to dismiss the claims against the President and partially dissolve the preliminary injunction on March 1, 2018, arguing "the President is not a proper defendant in this case" as separation of powers dictates "the non-ministerial conduct of the President when he acts in his official capacity cannot be enjoined." In their response, counsel for the Plaintiffs characterized the motion as a "startling proposition [that] should be rejected" and the "President is no king, but he too may be sued. This court has the power to determine whether the President has acted within the law, and to declare that the President violated the law." They added the "Defendants’ argument that the President has absolute immunity from a lawsuit challenging his own unconstitutional actions is based on little more than sleight-of-hand", noting the USDOJ arguments relied on citing cases where injunctive relief was applied, instead of declaratory relief. USDOJ replied that declaratory and injunctive relief were equivalent.

=== New Trump memorandum ===
After President Trump issued a new memorandum on March 23, 2018, revoking the prior Memorandum of August 25, USDOJ moved to dissolve the preliminary injunction and asked for a protective order. The motion to dissolve the preliminary injunction noted the new policy was not "a categorical ban based on transgender status, [but instead] this new policy, like the Carter policy before it, would turn on the medical condition of gender dysphoria and contain a nuanced set of exceptions allowing some transgender individuals, including every individual Plaintiff here, to serve." Since the new policy of March 2018 establishes gender dysphoria as a disqualifying medical condition, USDOJ argued "the military's new policy is constitutional", especially since the basis for the new policy asserted "that retaining the Carter policy would pose risks to military readiness". The proposed protective order asked that discovery should be halted, or the scope of discovery should be "significantly narrow[ed]" in light of the new policy.

On April 23, 2018, the Plaintiffs filed an amended complaint addressing the new Memorandum. The defendants filed a new motion to dismiss the amended complaint on May 11, arguing that the Department of Defense issued the new policy only after a "methodical and systematic review by military stakeholders qualified to understand the ramifications of policy changes."

On August 14, the court denied the defendants' motion for a protective order, and simultaneously granted the Plaintiffs' motion to compel the defendants to disclose documents in response to discovery.

== See also ==
- List of lawsuits involving Donald Trump
- Transgender personnel in the United States military
- Jane Doe v. Trump
- Karnoski v. Trump
- Stockman v. Trump
