= Doe v. Trump (2017) =

Lawsuit filed on August 9, 2017 and decided January 4, 2019

Jane Doe, et al v. Trump, et al
- Court: United States District Court for the District of Columbia
- Decided: Dismissed with prejudice on August 20, 2021
- Defendants: Donald Trump; James Mattis; Joseph Dunford; Ryan McCarthy; Richard Spencer; Heather Wilson; United States Coast Guard; Elaine Duke; Defense Health Agency; Raquel Bono; United States of America
- Plaintiffs: Jane Doe 1; Jane Doe 2; Jane Doe 3; Jane Doe 4; Jane Doe 5; John Doe 1; Regan V. Kibby; Dylan Kohere
- Citation: 1:17-cv-01597-CKK

Court membership
- Judge sitting: Colleen Kollar-Kotelly

Jane Doe v. Trump (1:17-cv-01597-CKK) was a lawsuit filed on August 9, 2017 in the United States District Court for the District of Columbia. The suit sought to block Donald Trump and top Pentagon officials from implementing the proposed ban on military service for transgender people under the auspices of the equal protection and Due Process Clause of the Fifth Amendment. On January 4, 2019, the court ruled that the Trump administration's policy should not be blocked. Nonetheless, the Trump administration's policy continued to be blocked due to three preliminary injunctions against it that were not part of this lawsuit and which remained in effect as of the lawsuit's conclusion on January 4, 2019.

The suit was filed on the behalf of five anonymous transgender service members by two major LGBT-rights organizations, GLBTQ Legal Advocates & Defenders (GLAD) and the National Center for Lesbian Rights, who filed a petition in the United States District Court for the District of Columbia.

The lawsuit was amended to add one more anonymous plaintiff and two named plaintiffs in late August 2017.

On January 25, 2021, President Biden issued an executive order lifting the ban on transgender military service. On August 20, 2021, the court dismissed the case with prejudice.

== Background ==
Trump first announced a policy banning transgender people from serving in the military in "any capacity" in a series of tweets on July 26, 2017, stating that allowing such service members would incur "tremendous medical costs and disruption". The decision reversed Obama administration policy to allow the enlistment of transgender personnel, which was initially approved by the Department of Defense to begin July 1, but was delayed by Defense Secretary Mattis. Trump issued formal guidance on the ban to the Secretaries of Defense and Homeland Security in a memorandum on August 25, 2017.

== History ==
On August 31, 2017, three former secretaries of military services, Eric Fanning (Army), Ray Mabus (Navy), and Deborah Lee James (Air Force), submitted declarations in support of the plaintiffs, and three plaintiffs were added to the lawsuit. Also on August 31, the plaintiffs applied for a preliminary injunction on the proposed ban, stating "it is unconstitutional" and that "Plaintiffs have suffered serious and irreparable harms that will continue absent this Court's intervention."

On October 4, the United States Department of Justice Civil Division filed a motion to dismiss the amended complaint in Jane Doe v. Trump and to oppose the application for a preliminary injunction, arguing instead "that challenge is premature several times over" and that Secretary Mattis's Interim Guidance, issued on September 14, 2017, protects currently-serving transgender personnel from involuntary discharge or denial of reenlistment. The lead author of the Justice Department's motion, Ryan Bradley Parker, previously defended the military's ban on gay soldiers. In response, the plaintiffs filed opposition to the motion to dismiss on October 16, stating the Interim Guidance issued by Secretary Mattis explicitly prohibited accession of transgender individuals and provided guidance for medical treatment that contradicted existing policy. Also on October 16, the attorney generals of fifteen states and the District of Columbia, led by Maura Healey, Attorney General of Massachusetts, filed an amicus brief supporting the suit. In the brief, the states asserted that "[n]othing about being transgender inhibits a person's ability to serve in the military or otherwise contribute to society" and that President Trump's ban was "apparently announced without any consultation with top military leaders".

=== Preliminary injunction granted ===
The Court holds that Plaintiffs are likely to succeed on their Fifth Amendment claim. As a form of government action that classifies people based on their gender identity, and disfavors a class of historically persecuted and politically powerless individuals, the President's directives are subject to a fairly searching form of scrutiny. Plaintiffs claim that the President's directives cannot survive such scrutiny because they are not genuinely based on legitimate concerns regarding military effectiveness or budget constraints, but are instead driven by a desire to express disapproval of transgender people generally. The Court finds that a number of factors—including the sheer breadth of the exclusion ordered by the directives, the unusual circumstances surrounding the President's announcement of them, the fact that the reasons given for them do not appear to be supported by any facts, and the recent rejection of those reasons by the military itself—strongly suggest that Plaintiffs' Fifth Amendment claim is meritorious.

— Judge Colleen Kollar-Kotelly, Memorandum Opinion, Jane Doe v. Trump (October 30, 2017).

Judge Colleen Kollar-Kotelly granted the plaintiffs' preliminary injunction on October 30, 2017. In the ruling, Judge Kollar-Kotelly noted the defendants' motion to dismiss the case was "perhaps compelling in the abstract, [but] wither away under scrutiny". The ruling effectively reinstated the policies established prior to President Trump's tweets announcing the ban, namely the retention and accession policies for transgender personnel that were effective on June 30, 2017. However, the court denied a preliminary injunction against the ban on government-funded sex reassignment surgery for service members "because no Plaintiff has demonstrated that they are substantially likely to be impacted by this directive".

=== Appeals ===
On November 21, 2017, the United States Department of Justice (USDOJ) appealed the preliminary injunction in the case of Jane Doe v. Trump. One day later, on November 22, USDOJ filed a motion seeking to clarify whether Secretary Mattis had independent authority to modify the original directive issued by Secretary Carter in 2016. The original Directive-type Memorandum (DTM) 16-005 permitted accession (entry to military service through enlistment or enrollment in a Service Academy, ROTC, or other similar program) of transgender individuals starting on July 1, 2017, and Secretary Mattis had modified DTM 16-005 just before accession was set to start by imposing a six-month delay to allow for a study of the effects on force "readiness and lethality". In their motion opposing the clarification, Plaintiffs claimed the Defendants were seeking a "substantive change to the Court's injunction" and the Court subsequently issued another order on November 27, 2017. In the order, Judge Kollar-Kotelly clarified the Order of October 30 effectively reverted the policy back to the status quo that existed prior to the Presidential Memorandum of August 25, meaning that accession of transgender individuals will proceed as scheduled starting January 1, 2018, per Secretary Mattis's modification issued June 30, 2017 to DTM 16-005.

On December 6, USDOJ filed for a partial stay of the order of November 27 requiring accessions to start on January 1, 2018, including a statement from Lernes J. Herbert, Acting Deputy Assistant Secretary of Defense, Military Personnel Policy, in which he argued that "transgender applicants may not receive the appropriate medical and administrative accession screening necessary for someone with a complex medical condition. As a result, an applicant may be accessed for military service who is not physically or psychologically equipped to engage in combat/operational service." In the accompanying Memorandum of Points and Authorities, USDOJ also argued the military was not given "the appropriate level of deference" while studying the service of transgender troops, and that Secretary Mattis retained "independent authority to extend the effective date of the new accessions policy" as that authority had not been challenged in the original complaint. In opposition, Plaintiffs filed a motion on December 8, noting that preparations for accession of transgender candidates were largely complete by July 1, 2017, and an additional six months had been added. The memorandum added "the government offers no explanation why a ban on accession by transgender people would be any less unconstitutional if it were imposed by the Secretary [of Defense] based on his own initiative rather than at the direction of the President."

Although they hint in their most recent pleading that a new policy proposal is forthcoming in the next few weeks, Defendants fail to provide the Court with any insight at all into what the policy might be. The Court is left to speculate. On the one hand, to the extent the policy Defendants foresee adopting in the future is a ban on accessions—which the Court has already concluded is likely to be proven unconstitutional—this is clearly not a reason to stay the injunction in this case. On the other hand, as the Court has already explained, there is no reason to conclude on the present record that Defendants intend to implement any sort of policy allowing for the accession of transgender individuals. Defendants have never given the Court any reason to conclude that this would be the case.

— Judge Colleen Kollar-Kotelly, Order of December 11, 2017

On December 11, Judge Kollar-Kotelly denied the motion for partial stay, noting it took three weeks for USDOJ to file the first appeal, and that she "would have expected Defendants to act with more alacrity" if the January 1, 2018 deadline for accession was unmanageable. Judge Kollar-Kotelly also stated Hebert's declaration "[failed] to acknowledge the considerable amount of time Defendants have already had to prepare for the implementation of this [accession] policy", nearly a year and a half since the original DTM 16-005 was issued by Secretary Carter on June 30, 2016, and further, "that considerable work has been done already during this lengthy period."

=== Emergency stay ===
USDOJ filed for an emergency stay with the D.C. Circuit late on December 11, calling the accession of transgender individuals "a significant change to its standards for the composition of the armed forces" and asking that either Secretary Mattis be allowed to further defer the start of accessions, or ruling the scope of the preliminary injunction and clarifying order should narrowly apply only to the identified Plaintiffs. In their response filed on December 15, Plaintiffs noted "the government cannot credibly claim that it will be irreparably harmed by implementing a policy that it was on track to implement six months ago" and the "facially discriminatory ban on accession and service by transgender people serves no governmental interest sufficient to satisfy the Fifth Amendment, and the district court's injunction barring its enforcement is [...] the ordinary remedy for unconstitutional government action".

In addition, an amici brief was filed by retired military officers and national security officials supporting the injunction on December 15. The brief compared the accession of transgender candidates with prior changes to accession policy, including the racial and sexual integrations that occurred during the Truman and Obama Administrations, concluding that "Each of the above personnel decisions was the product of a rigorous policy review involving senior military officials and an evidence-based examination of the likely impact of the proposed change. In sharp contrast, on the morning of July 26, 2017, President Trump suddenly announced a ban on transgender persons serving in the military in a series of three tweets. No effort was made—nor evidence presented—to show that this pronouncement resulted from any analysis of the cost or disruption allegedly caused by allowing transgender individuals to serve openly in the military."

On December 22, 2017, a three-judge panel of the D.C. Circuit denied the request for an emergency stay. In the order, the judges wrote that USDOJ had failed to identify "the scope of Secretary Mattis's asserted authority to act in this matter entirely independently of the specific directions of the commander in Chief", concluding that USDOJ had failed "to make a compelling case on the current record that any of the stay factors weigh in their favor".

=== Discovery and protective orders ===
In December 2017, the Plaintiffs served a discovery request aimed at identifying when and on what basis President Trump decided to ban military service by transgender persons. The Defendants responded by claiming the information should be withheld on the basis of separation-of-powers and as part of the deliberative process privilege. Judge Kollar-Kotelly issued two orders in February 2018: one to allow the designation of confidential documents, removing those so designated from public view, and another to ensure that confidential material is handled by both sides appropriately.

USDOJ formally filed a motion for a protective order on February 27, 2018, complaining about the "multiple, burdensome discovery requests [issued] directly to the President of the United States" and noting the responsiveness in issuing "more than 80,000 pages of documents on an expedited, rolling basis from the Department of Defense, Joint Chiefs of Staff, Defense Health Agency, and the Departments of the Army, Air Force, and Navy". In their response, the Plaintiffs argued that "[t]here are good reasons to doubt—and to investigate—whether the ban originated from, or was even vetted by, the Nation's military professionals" and stated that discovery was meant to assess "any process that preceded the reversal of the open service policy" since the Defendants' arguments relied on assertions of military deference and privilege based on a deliberative process. USDOJ argued the "entire purpose of [the Plaintiffs'] demand is to test and expose the President's deliberative process, and protection of the information sought through interrogatories falls comfortably within the law protecting presidential communications and deliberations", tying the protective order to the motion to dismiss the President as a defendant filed on March 2.

On March 2, USDOJ followed up with a second motion to remove the President as a defendant and dissolve the injunction with respect to the President, arguing the "Plaintiffs may not obtain—and the Court may not order—injunctive or declaratory relief directly against the President for his official conduct" but conceding "in cases involving the President and other defendants, courts avoid granting relief against the President and instead grant relief only against subordinate officials in the Executive Branch. The plaintiffs countered by arguing the move was "a contrived route to discovery in a case where the President's decision caused Plaintiffs' injuries, the genesis and purpose of that decision are central questions in the case, and the Executive Office of the President maintains records that may be critical to the litigation." USDOJ clarified their position by asserting that " a court may not grant injunctive or declaratory relief against the President for his official, non-ministerial conduct particularly where, as here, relief granted against subordinate Executive officials would provide full relief to Plaintiffs" and outlined a path forward by stating "the Court could dismiss the President from the case, review the constitutionality of the operative policy governing military service by transgender individuals, and, if the Court finds the policy to be unconstitutional, issue an injunction and/or a declaratory judgment against the other defendants".

=== New Trump memorandum ===
On March 23, 2018, armed with a new Presidential Memorandum, the defendants filed two new motions: one to dissolve the preliminary injunction, and another for a protective order. The motion to dissolve the preliminary injunction stated "this new policy, like the Carter policy before it, turns on the medical condition of gender dysphoria and contains a nuanced set of exceptions allowing some transgender individuals, including almost every Plaintiff here, to serve" and asserted "the military's new policy is constitutional", concluding that challenges to the new policy "should not be litigated under the shadow of a preliminary injunction of a Presidential Memorandum that is no longer in effect". The protective order asked that discovery proceedings be halted while the motion to dissolve the preliminary injunction was being considered.

Judge Kollar-Kotelly outlined required document filing dates in an order issued on March 28, which stated the Plaintiffs shall file an amended complaint by April 6, and that discovery would continue pending a formal Reply in Support of their motion for a protective order. The preliminary injunction was left in place for now pending the amended complaint. Following the amendment, the defendants filed motions to dismiss the amended complaint and dissolve the preliminary injunction, both of which the court denied on August 6, 2018.

=== Defendants ===
In addition to President Trump, the amended suit named as defendants the Secretaries of Defense (James Mattis), the Army (Ryan McCarthy, acting), the Navy (Richard Spencer), the Air Force (Heather Wilson), and Homeland Security (Kirstjen Nielsen). Mattis had resigned his position as Defense Secretary just days before the ruling in this lawsuit.

As of April 2020, most of the defendants named in the original lawsuit had either resigned or retired from their official capacities. The case remained undecided; trans people were marginalized and excluded by Directive-type Memorandum-19-004.

== See also ==
- Presidential Memorandum for the Secretary of Defense and the Secretary of Homeland Security
- List of lawsuits involving Donald Trump
- Transgender personnel in the United States military
- Stone v. Trump
- Karnoski v. Trump
- Stockman v. Trump
