= Suspect classification =

US legal term

In United States constitutional law, a suspect classification is a class or group of persons meeting a series of criteria suggesting they are likely the subject of discrimination. These classes receive closer scrutiny by courts when an equal protection claim alleging unconstitutional discrimination is asserted against a law, regulation, or other government action, or sometimes private action. When a law or government action affects a group that falls under a suspect classification, courts apply the strict scrutiny standard in reviewing the constitutional validity of a law or action.

== Criteria ==
The United States Supreme Court has mentioned a variety of criteria that, in some combination, may qualify a group as a suspect class, but the Court has not declared that any particular set of criteria are either necessary or sufficient to qualify.

Some of the criteria that have been cited include:

- The group has historically been discriminated against or have been subject to prejudice, hostility, or stigma, perhaps due, at least in part, to stereotypes.
- They possess an immutable or highly visible trait.
- They are powerless to protect themselves via the political process and is a "discrete" and "insular" minority.
- The group's distinguishing characteristic does not inhibit it from contributing meaningfully to society.

== Classification ==
=== Suspect class ===
The Supreme Court established suspect classifications as judicial precedent with two related decisions after the attack on Pearl Harbor involving executive orders restricting the rights of Japanese American citizens—Hirabayashi v. United States and Korematsu v. United States.

The Supreme Court recognizes race, national origin, and religion as suspect classes; it therefore analyzes any government action that discriminates against these classes under strict scrutiny.

In Perry v. Schwarzenegger, the U.S. District Court for Northern California, in its findings of fact, commented that sexual orientation could be considered a suspect class, but that Proposition 8 failed to satisfy even the much more deferential rational basis review on the facts presented. The U.S. District Court for Nebraska held the same in Citizens for Equal Protection v. Bruning, but was reversed on appeal by the Eighth Circuit.

As federal law currently stands, neither sexual orientation nor gender identity is considered a federal suspect class, although many states have state constitutional nondiscrimination protections. Montana Supreme Court Justice Laurie McKinnon recommended in the 2024 case Cross v. State that "this Court should ... hold that transgender status is a suspect class." That view is contrary to that of Supreme Court Justice Amy Coney Barrett, who argued in a concurrence to the court's opinion in the 2025 case United States v. Skrmetti that transgender status should not be recognized as a suspect or quasi-suspect class.

=== Quasi-suspect class ===
Intermediate scrutiny is applied to groups that fall under quasi-suspect classification.

Sex and legitimacy of birth have been held to be quasi-suspect classes.

In 2012, the District Court for Northern California discussed this type of classification, but applied heightened scrutiny without specifically labeling gays and lesbians a suspect or quasi-suspect class in its decision.

Striking down section three of the Defense of Marriage Act as unconstitutional in United States v. Windsor, the Second Circuit Court of Appeals held sexual orientation to be a quasi-suspect classification, and determined that laws that classify people on such basis should be subject to intermediate scrutiny. It was the first time a federal court had applied quasi-suspect classification in a sexual orientation case. The Supreme Court, however, has not decided whether sexual orientation fits into any identified class.

=== Alienage ===
Alienage is a unique category which references the state of someone not being a citizen of the United States. For purposes of state law, legal aliens are a suspect class. As such, state actions are analyzed according to strict scrutiny. In contrast, because the United States Congress has the power to regulate immigration, federal government action that discriminates based on alienage is only subject to rational basis scrutiny. State acts that affect unlawful immigrants are generally analyzed with rational basis review unless the topic is education of children, in which case they are analyzed under intermediate scrutiny based on Plyler v. Doe.

=== All others ===
Rational basis scrutiny is applied to all other discriminatory statutes. Rational basis scrutiny currently covers all other discriminatory criteria such as age, disability, wealth, political preference, political affiliation, or criminal conviction.

== Levels of judicial review ==
=== Strict scrutiny ===
To satisfy the strict scrutiny, suspect classifications such as race, alienage, or national origin must be necessary to promote a compelling state interest when there is no less restrictive alternative method available to accomplish the government (state's) interest.

The practical result of this legal doctrine is that government sponsored discrimination on the account of a citizen's race, skin color, ethnicity, religion, or national origin is almost always unconstitutional, unless it is a compelling, narrowly tailored and temporary piece of legislation dealing with national security, defense, or affirmative action. Korematsu v. United States, regarding Japanese internment, and Grutter v. Bollinger, upholding affirmative action based upon racial diversity, are the only cases in which a racially discriminatory law has been upheld under the strict scrutiny test.

Strict scrutiny is also applied to restrictions of any fundamental right, regardless of the group involved.

=== Intermediate scrutiny ===
When intermediate scrutiny is employed, the courts are more likely to oppose discriminatory state actions than under rational basis review particularly if a law is based on gender. Acts subject to intermediate scrutiny must be closely related to an important government interest. In United States v. Virginia (1996), the Supreme Court clarified that intermediate scrutiny of actions that discriminate on the basis of gender require an "exceedingly persuasive justification" and must relate to real, fact-based, or biological differences between the sexes.

=== Rational basis ===
When rational basis review is used, it means that the classification is one that overwhelmingly tends to be rational, e.g. distinguishing criminals from non-criminals. This leads to wide political discretion and a focus of judicial resources to other cases where the classification employed tends to be more suspicious, and thus close judicial balancing is needed.

== Classifications under state law ==
The Supreme Court's holdings impose a minimum standard to which each State must adhere. Hence, a State law that discriminates against citizens because of their race, must be reviewed by the applicable State and inferior federal courts using the strict scrutiny basis of review. A State may, generally, choose to give its citizens more rights or protections than the minimum federal standard when considering state law. For example, in 2008 the Supreme Court of California used the strict scrutiny basis of review to strike down a California statute denying legal recognition of same-sex marriages.

California classifies sexual orientation as a suspect class under state law. Connecticut and Iowa classify sexual orientation as a quasi-suspect class under their respective state laws.

== See also ==
- Discrimination in the United States
- Protected group
- Tyranny of the majority
