= Executive Order 14183 =

2025 executive order signed by Donald Trump

- Prioritizing Military Excellence and Readiness
- Front page of Executive Order 14183
- Type: Executive order
- Number: 14183
- President: Donald Trump
- Signed: January 27, 2025

Federal Register details
- Federal Register document number: 2025-02178
- Publication date: January 27, 2025

Summary
- The executive order directs the Department of Defense to revise policies to exclude individuals who identify with a gender different from their biological sex from military service, citing concerns over unit cohesion, mental and physical readiness, and overall military effectiveness.

Executive Order 14183, titled "Prioritizing Military Excellence and Readiness", is an executive order issued by President Donald Trump on January 27, 2025, banning transgender people from military service. In March 2025, a federal judge blocked the Executive Order; but in May of that year the Supreme Court allowed the Trump administration to reinstate the ban while legal challenges continue in the Ninth Circuit. It is part of a broader persecution of transgender people under the second Trump administration.

== Provisions ==
- The order declares it the policy of the United States government that identifying as a gender that differs from an individual's assigned sex "conflicts with a soldier's commitment to an honorable, truthful, and disciplined lifestyle, even in one's personal life".
- The order declares that the use of pronouns inconsistent with one's assigned sex compromises the ability of the government to "establish high standards for troop readiness, lethality, cohesion, honesty, humility, uniformity, and integrity"

== Implementation ==
On February 10, 2025, Defense Secretary Pete Hegseth filed a memo with the U.S. District Court in Washington, D.C. stating that, effective immediately, no "individuals with a history of gender dysphoria" would be permitted to join the military, and no "medical procedures associated with affirming or facilitating a gender transition" would be provided to service members. A May 15 memo later detailed how trans service members would be discharged, saying that they would be given the discharge code of “JDK”, which is typically used to indicate that a soldier is considered a threat to national security, and which can prevent them from getting future jobs or security clearances.

In August 2025, the United States Air Force announced that long-serving transgender members normally eligible for retirement benefits would be denied them.

== Legal challenges ==
The order was challenged in a court filing, Talbott v. Trump, by six active duty transgender service members, and two prospective members, who sought a preliminary injunction. One of the active duty soldiers alleged that while on approved leave to receive medical care, he received a call saying that he would be considered AWOL if he did not return immediately. In a court hearing with US District Judge Ana C. Reyes, the plaintiffs were argued for by GLAD Senior Director of Transgender and Queer Rights Jennifer Levi; while the Department of Justice was represented by Jason Lynch.

During the hearing, the plaintiffs argued that the order violated their rights under the Fifth Amendment to the United States Constitution, and had made them "unequal and dispensable, demeaning them in the eyes of their fellow service members and the public". The defense meanwhile agreed that the transgender service members impacted were "honorable, truthful, and disciplined" and had made the United States safer, but argued for the ban on the grounds that “A transgender individual identifying as a woman is not similarly situated to a biological female, nor is a transgender individual identifying as a man similarly situated to a biological male".

Judge Reyes described the order as an attempt to label "an entire category of people dishonest, dishonorable, undisciplined, immodest, who lack integrity -- people who have taken an oath to defend this country, who have been under fire, people who have taken fire for this country", saying that it showed an "unadulterated animus" towards the transgender community, and that portions of it were "frankly ridiculous". Shortly thereafter, the Department of Justice filed a rare judicial complaint against Reyes for "hostile and egregious misconduct". The complaint was eventually dismissed by Chief Judge Sri Srinivasan of the United States Court of Appeals for the District of Columbia Circuit.

On March 18, 2025, Reyes blocked the executive order, ruling that banning trans people from the military likely violated their constitutional rights. Reyes stayed her order three days, to give time for an appeal.

On March 17, 2025, another lawsuit challenging the executive order was filed in the US District Court for New Jersey by two trans men removed from the Air Force. On March 24, 2025, judge Christine O'Hearn issued a two-week ban on enforcing the executive order.

On May 6, 2025, the Supreme Court allowed the Trump administration to reinstate its ban on transgender military service members while legal challenges continue in the Ninth Circuit.

On June 1, 2026, the DC Circuit ruled that transgender members of the military can continue to serve, but the armed services can continue refusing to enlist new transgender members.

== See also ==
- 2020s anti-LGBTQ movement in the United States
- Persecution of transgender people under the second Trump administration
- Transgender personnel in the United States military
- List of executive orders in the second presidency of Donald Trump
- Executive Order 14187 ("Protecting Children from Chemical and Surgical Mutilation")
- Executive Order 14168 ("Defending Women from Gender Ideology Extremism and Restoring Biological Truth to the Federal Government")
- Don't ask, don't tell (1994-2011)
