= Sage =

Sage, or SAGE may refer to:

== Plants ==
- Salvia officinalis, common sage, a small evergreen subshrub used as a culinary herb
- Salvia, a large genus commonly referred to as sages, containing the common sage
- Teucrium scorodonia, wood sage, a herb used for flavouring beverages
- Lamiaceae, a family of flowering plants commonly known as the mint, deadnettle or sage family
- Leucophyllum, a genus of evergreen shrubs in the figwort family, often called sages
- Artemisia (plant), a genus of shrubs in the composite family, includes several members referred to as sage or sagebrush

== Arts, entertainment and media ==
=== Fictional characters ===
- Sage (Marvel Comics), in Marvel comics
- Sage (Dark Oracle), in the Canadian TV series
- Sage, in the TV show Hot Wheels Battle Force 5
- Sage, a Shuffle! character
- Sage, in The Vampire Diaries (season 3)
- Sage the Owl, in The Herbs
- The Sage, in the Groo the Wanderer comics
- Sages, characters of The Legend of Zelda
- Toad Sage and the Sage of the Six Paths, Naruto characters
- Sage, a living tumbleweed in The SpongeBob Movie: Sponge on the Run
- Sage (Sonic the Hedgehog), in the Sonic the Hedgehog franchise
- The Dark Sage, an evolved form of the top-ranking Level 25 the Dark Magician of Yu-Gi-Oh! Duel Monsters
- Sister Sage, in The Boys (season 4)
- Sage, in Brave Animated Series
- Sage, in Valorant

=== Other uses in arts, entertainment and media ===
- Sage writing, a form of literary non-fiction popular in the Victorian era
- The Glasshouse, Gateshead, entertainment venue formerly known as "The Sage" in England
- The Sage, planned arena and conference venue in Gateshead, England
- Sonic Amateur Games Expo (SAGE), an online event that primarily demonstrates Sonic the Hedgehog fangames
- "Sage", a single by Hatchie from Liquorice

== Businesses ==
- Sage Appliances, a European subsidiary of the Australian Breville Group
- Frederick Sage & Company, a British interior design company, which later extended into aircraft manufacturing
- SAGE Computer Technology, an American computer manufacturer, later named Stride
- Sage Group, a British multinational enterprise software company
- Sage Publishing (formerly SAGE Publications), an American publishing company
- Sage Telecom, an American telecommunications company
- SAGE Electrochromics, an American glass development company

== Organizations ==
- Services & Advocacy for GLBT Elders (SAGE), an American non-profit organization
- Strategic Advisory Group of Experts (SAGE), a body advising World Health Organization
- Scientific Advisory Group for Emergencies (SAGE), a British government advisory body
- Swedish Agency for Government Employers, a Swedish administrative authority
- SAGE (organization), now LISA, the USENIX special interest group for system administrators
- SAGE-AU, an Australian professional association of system administrators
- Sage Bionetworks, an American nonprofit organization
- Society of American Gastrointestinal and Endoscopic Surgeons (SAGES), an American professional organization

== People ==
- Sage (name), including a list of people with the surname or given name
- Sage the Gemini, (born; 1992) American rapper, born as Dominic Wynn Woods
- Sage (philosophy), in classical philosophy, someone who has attained wisdom
- Wise old man, or sage, an archetype as described by Carl Jung

== Places ==
=== Antarctica ===
- Sage Nunataks

=== Canada ===
- Sage, a Neighbourhoods in North Bay, Ontario

=== United States ===
- Sage, Arkansas
- Sage, California
- Sage, Bethel, and Pleasant Hill, Texas
- Sage, Wyoming
- Sage River, in Michigan

== Schools ==
- Sage University, Indore, Madhya Pradesh, India
- The Sage Colleges, three private schools in New York state, US
- The Sage School, a private school in Foxboro, Massachusetts, US

== Science and technology ==
=== Military equipment ===
- Semi-Automatic Ground Environment, NORAD's radar coordination computers
  - SAGE radar stations
- USS Sage, a World War II-era minesweeper

=== Software ===
- Sage 300, enterprise management and accounting software
- Sage 50, accounting software
- SageMath, formerly known as Sage, free mathematics software
- SAGE (game engine)

=== Other uses in science and technology ===
- Serial analysis of gene expression, a molecular biology technique for measuring mRNA levels
- Soviet–American Gallium Experiment, a radiochemical experiment in solar neutrino physics
- Stratospheric Aerosol and Gas Experiment, satellites used to study the chemical composition of Earth's atmosphere
- Study on Global Ageing and Adult Health, a study run by the World Health Organization

== Other uses ==
- Sage (color), a grey-green color resembling that of dried sage leaves
- SAGE (journal) or Sage: A Scholarly Journal on Black Women, an academic journal
- Sage, a Spyderco knife

== See also ==
- Rishi or Sage, a Hindu term for an accomplished and enlightened person
- Lesage (disambiguation), including Le Sage
- Sagacity (disambiguation)
- Salvia (disambiguation)
- Seven Sages (disambiguation)
- Phlomis, a genus known as Jerusalem sage
  - Phlomis fruticosa, Jerusalem sage
- Artemisia (plant), a genus known as sagebrush
  - Artemisia tridentata, sagebrush
- Eriogonum jamesii, antelope sage
- Leucophyllum frutescens, Texas sage or purple sage
- Coastal sage scrub, a low scrubland plant community
