= Sage (name) =

- Garden sage.
- Gender: Unisex, predominantly female(United States) predominantly male(United Kingdom)

Origin
- Origin: English
- Meaning: prophet or sage

Sage (/seɪdʒ/) is a family name and a given name. It can also be spelled Saige or Sayge or Sayje. Sage's origin, as well as its use, is in the English language. The name is derived from the English word 'sage' in reference to a wise person, or possibly the herb.

Variants include Saege, Saeje, Sagen, Sager, Sagia, Saig, Saije, Saje, Salvia, Sayg, Sayge, and Sayje. The variant spelling Saige is another English form. Its meaning is "herb" or "prophet" or "wise one".

== Surname ==
- Abby Sage, Canadian musician
- Amanda Sage (born 1978), American born painter based in Vienna
- Andrew P. Sage (1933–2014), American systems engineer
- Anna Sage, alias of Ana Cumpănaș (1889–1947), brothel owner in Chicago
- Angie Sage (born 1952), English author
- Balthazar-Georges Sage (1740–1824), French chemist
- Bill Sage (born 1962), American actor
- Chauncey S. Sage (1816–1890), New York assemblyman
- George Sage (disambiguation), several people
- Greg Sage (born 1951), American punk musician
- Halston Sage (born 1993), American actress
- Harry Sage (1864–1947), American Major League Baseball catcher
- Henry Sage (disambiguation), several people
- Joe Sage (1920–1977), American politician
- Kay Sage (1898–1963), American Surrealist artist and poet
- Leland Sage (1899–1989), American history professor
- Lorna Sage (1943–2001), English academic, literary critic
- Margaret Olivia Slocum Sage (1828–1918), American philanthropist
- Mel Sage (b. 1964), English former footballer
- Paula Sage (born c. 1980), Scottish actress, Special Olympian, advocate
- Pierre Sage (born 1979), French football manager
- Rachael Sage (born 1971), American songwriter
- Rosemary Sage (fl. 2000), English expert in special education
- Russell Sage (1816–1906), American financier and politician
- Sidney A. Sage (1852–1909), American politician
- Thomas Henry Sage (1882–1945), English recipient of the Victoria Cross
- William H. Sage (1859–1922), American Medal of Honor recipient

== Given name ==
- Sage Beckett (born 1985), American professional wrestler
- Sage Brocklebank (born 1978), Canadian actor
- Sage Canaday (born 1985), American long-distance runner
- Sage Dixon (fl. 2014), American politician
- Sage Doxtater (born 1998), Canadian football player
- Sage Elsesser (born 1997), American rapper
- Sage Erickson (born 1990), American surfer
- Sage Fox (fl. 2013), American veteran and civil rights leader
- Sage Francis (born 1976), American rapper
- Saige Harper (born 2002), American Paralympic rower
- Sage Karam (born 1995), American racing driver
- Sage Kinvig (born 1870–1962), one of the last native speaker of the Manx language
- Sage Kirkpatrick (born 1969), Czech actress
- Sage Kotsenburg (born 1993), American snowboarder
- Saige Martin (fl. 2012), American artist and politician
- Sage Northcutt (born 1996), American mixed martial artist
- Sage Rosenfels (born 1978), American football quarterback
- Sage Sharp (born 1985), American software engineer
- Sage Stallone (1976–2012), American actor
- Sage Steele (born 1972), American television host
- Sage Sohier (born 1954), American photographer
- Sage Surratt (born 1998), American football player
- Sage Walker (fl. 1997), American science fiction writer
- Sage Watson (born 1994), Canadian athlete
- Sage Weil (born 1978), American architect

== See also ==
- Lesage (disambiguation)
- Jenny Sages (born 1933), Australian artist
