= Lesaca (surname) =

Lesaca is a surname. Notable people with the surname include:

- Marilou Arroyo-Lesaca, Filipino politician
- Potenciano Lesaca (1871–1941), Filipino politician

== See also ==
- Lesaka
- Lesage (surname)
- Lessa (surname)
