= Muni (saint) =

Ancient Indian sages and hermits or ancient Indian ascetics

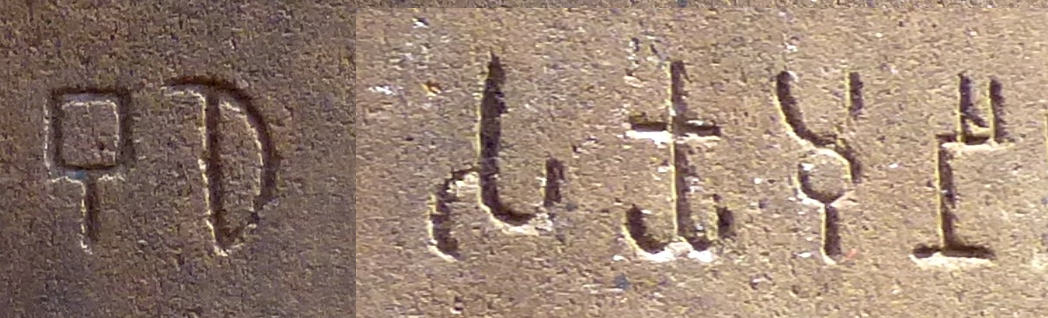
The words "Bu-dhe" (the Buddha) and "Sa-kya-mu-nī " ("Sage of the Shakyas") in the Brahmi script, on Ashoka's Rummindei Minor Pillar Edict (circa 250 BCE).

Muni (Sanskrit: मुनि, "silent") is a term for types of ancient Indian sages and hermits or ancient Indian ascetics. Sages of this type are said to know the truth of existence not on the basis of scientific or religious texts but through their own realization.

== Buddhism ==
In Buddhism the term "Muni" is used as a title of Gautama Buddha — who, being born among the tribe of the Śākyas, is called Śākyamuni (sage of the Shakyas). Various other titles like Munīndra (Sanskrit; Pali: Muninda; meaning "lord of Munis"), Munivar (Greatest among Munis), Munirāja (King of Munis), Munīśvara (Sanskrit; Pali: Munissaro; meaning "lord of Munis"), Mahāmuni (The great[est] Muni) are also given to the Buddhas. The Mahamuni temple in Mandalay, Myanmar is named after the title of the Buddha.

== Hinduism ==
- In Rigveda the name mūni refers to a known Vedic Rishi who were Keśin
- In a much later work, the Laghu-yoga-vasistha, mūnis are divided into two types:
1. kaṣtha tapasvin - ascetics permanently residing in stillness
2. jīvanmukta - those liberated for life in a physical body

== See also ==
- Keśin
- Sage (philosophy)
- Saint
