= Transgender personnel in the United States military =

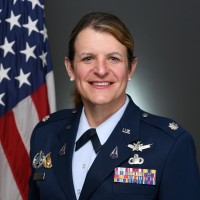
- Colonel Bree Fram, the highest-ranking and longest-serving openly transgender U.S. military officer, served from 2003 to 2026 and came out in 2016.

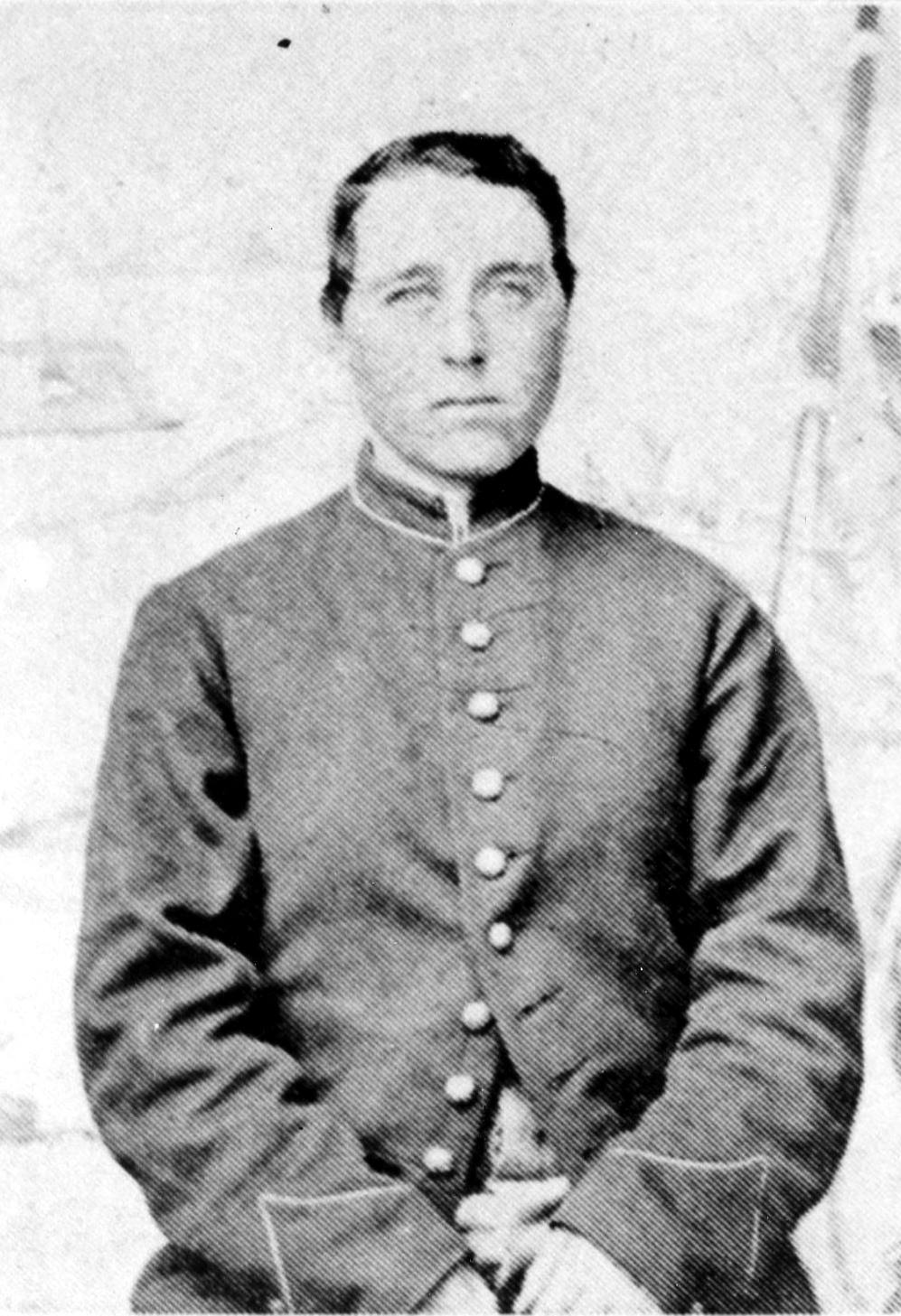
- Albert Cashier, a transgender man who served as a Union army soldier in the Civil War.

Legal Status
- Current status: Banned from enlisting in and serving in the U.S. military, except under narrow waivers for those who have not undergone gender transition, have maintained stability in their birth sex for at least 36 consecutive months, serve in roles critical to warfighting capabilities, and are willing to adhere to all standards associated with their birth sex
- Current law: Executive Order 14183: Prioritizing Military Excellence and Readiness
- Previous laws: Executive Order 10450; Army Regulation 40-501: Standards of Medical Fitness; Department of Defense (DoD) Directive 1332.14 – Enlisted Administrative Separations; DoD Directive 1332.30 – Separation of Regular Commissioned Officers; Department of Defense Instruction (DoDI) 6130.03 – Medical Standards for Appointment, Enlistment, or Induction into the Military Services; Directive-Type Memorandum (DTM) 16-005: Military Service of Transgender Service Members; Presidential Memorandum for the Secretary of Defense and the Secretary of Homeland Security; Presidential Memorandum for the Secretary of Defense and the Secretary of Homeland Security Regarding Military Service by Transgender Individuals; DoDI 1300.28: In-Service Transition for Transgender Service Members; DTM-19-004: Military Service by Transgender Persons and Persons with Gender Dysphoria; DoDI 1300.28: Military Service by Transgender Persons and Persons with Gender Dysphoria; Executive Order on Enabling All Qualified Americans to Serve Their Country in Uniform; DoDI 1300.28: In-Service Transition for Transgender Service Members; DoDI 6130.03: Medical Standards for Appointment, Enlistment, or Induction into the Military Services
- Court cases: Talbott v. United States; Doe v. Trump; Human Rights Campaign Foundation & Lambda Legal v. Trump; Karnoski v. Trump; Stockman v. Trump

Transgender people have served or sought to serve in the United States Armed Forces throughout its history. As of May 8, 2025, transgender individuals are banned from enlisting in and serving in the U.S. military, except under narrow waivers for those who have not undergone gender transition, have maintained stability in their birth sex for at least 36 consecutive months, serve in roles critical to warfighting capabilities, and are willing to adhere to all standards associated with their birth sex.

From January 28 to March 27, 2025, the U.S. Navy began rejecting all transgender applicants. Across the rest of the U.S. Armed Forces, transgender enlistment and access to publicly funded gender-affirming surgeries were paused on February 7, 2025, and a full ban on transgender service was implemented on February 26, 2025. These restrictions were paused from March 27, when a nationwide preliminary injunction was issued in the case Shilling v. United States, to May 6, when the U.S. Supreme Court stayed the injunction allowing the ban to resume effect. As of September 2025, the ban is being appealed in the Ninth Circuit.

== History ==
=== Service in secret (pre–1960) ===
Many women during the American Civil War disguised themselves as men to enlist as soldiers and fight in the war. During this time, women were not legally allowed to fight; however, it is estimated there were more than 400 women who were passing as male soldiers during the war. Many of these female soldiers' true identities were never discovered throughout the time of their service. When enlisting, adult women were often able to pass as teenage boys. The physical examinations were lax, leading to many women able to begin training. There were numerous instances of soldiers' female identities being exposed, usually after having been hurt and sent to a soldiers' hospital. Most often, these women just received medical attention and were sent home. However, in several instances, some women who had been disguised as male soldiers were punished or even imprisoned.

Assigned female at birth, Union Army soldier Albert Cashier enlisted on August 6, 1862. Born in Belvidere, Illinois, his transition to male remained unknown throughout the entirety of his service, and he kept the identity of Albert Cashier for the remainder of his life. It was not until 1911, while working as a handy man, that he was struck by an automobile and fractured his leg. The physician who treated Cashier became aware of his assigned sex at birth. Shortly after the injury, Cashier was admitted into the Soldiers' and Sailors' Home in Quincy, Illinois, where, in his application, he gave his birth name, and stated that he was born in Ireland on December 25, 1844. At the home, only the doctor knew that he was transgender, and he was able to continue to live as Albert Cashier along with other patients in the home. When his mental health became too deteriorated for the home to adequately take care of him, he was sent to an insane asylum at Watertown. At the asylum Albert was deadnamed and forced to wear dresses until his death in 1915. Albert Cashier was buried with full military honors and uniform, with his gravestone proclaiming "Albert D. J. Cashier" before his deadname.

In 1952, Christine Jorgensen was the first transgender American woman to undergo gender confirmation surgery after being drafted into the United States Army to serve during World War II. The surgery made front-page news with headlines such as "Ex-GI Becomes Blonde Beauty" from the New York Daily News focusing on her prior military service.

=== Cold war crackdown (1960–2008) ===
As early as 1960, Executive Order 10450 was applied to ban transgender individuals from serving in the United States military. On May 17, 1963, gender transitioned or transitioning individuals were officially prohibited from the United States military by Army Regulation 40-501. This policy reasoned transgender people were medically unqualified to serve because their mental state was considered unfit.

In the 1980s, the United States military decided to apply medical regulations more forcefully on those who identified as transgender. In the case Doe v. Alexander (1981), which was about a transgender woman who had been rejected from the United States Army Reserve due to having had gender reassignment surgery, the Army defended their policy of denying enlistment to transsexual persons by stating that supporting transsexuals would raise a medical problem in the form of hormone supplements not always being available for such personnel. Leyland v. Orr (1987) was about Air Force member Leyland, a transgender woman, who underwent a gender reassignment surgery before being discharged. The courts ruled this discharge as valid due to the reasoning that Leyland was indeed unfit physically rather than mentally. This judgement was determined by inferring that genital surgery is similar to an amputation surgery, which leaves the individual unable to meet the demands of a soldier.

=== Obama administration (2009–2016) ===
==== 2009–2012 ====
Under Department of Defense Instruction 6130.03, "Medical Standards for Appointment, Enlistment, or Induction in the Military Services" dated July 2, 2012, candidates for military service should not have "[c]urrent or history of psychosexual conditions, including but not limited to transsexualism, exhibitionism, transvestism, voyeurism, and other paraphilias" which is noted as "not a contradiction of the repeal of 'Don't Ask, Don't Tell'" since homosexuality was removed from the list of psychosexual conditions in DSM in 1973.

==== 2013–2014 ====
In 2013, Captain Sage Fox, who had enlisted in the Army 1993 and taken time off after transitioning to the Reserves in 2012 to undergo sex reassignment surgery, was ordered to resume active duty, despite policies blocking the service of transgender personnel. After a review, the military concluded that it could not legally discharge her, so Fox was asked to return and serve again as a woman. This made her the first openly transgender person serving in the military. She served for 2 weeks and then she had orders to be placed on the inactive reserve which she believed was due to her gender identity. She was not granted disability but her medical records did not indicate her unfit to serve. In 2016, Obama repealed the transgender ban in the military and Sage Fox was working with the medical board and was expected to be reenlisted.

On March 13, 2014, an advisory panel organized by the Palm Center, a research institute based at San Francisco State University, released a report that found no compelling medical reason for placing limitations on military service by transgender individuals. It said DoD rules that prevented enlistment or continued service by transgender individuals were based on outmoded and untenable ideas about their psychological and physical fitness, and it dismissed concerns about the costs of medical care. It said the DoD's policies could be changed by an executive order. The panel was headed by former surgeon general Joycelyn Elders and Rear Adm. Alan Steinman, a former chief health and safety director for the Coast Guard. It concluded:

We determined not only that there is no compelling medical reason for the ban, but also that the ban itself is an expensive, damaging and unfair barrier to health care access for the approximately 15,450 transgender personnel who serve currently in the active, Guard and reserve components. Medical regulations requiring the discharge of transgender personnel are inconsistent with how the military regulates all other medical and psychological conditions, and transgender-related conditions appear to be the only gender-related conditions that require discharge irrespective of fitness for duty.

At the time, service personnel were still being dismissed for being transgender despite their satisfactory job performance. The dismissal policy was based on outdated medical diagnoses which suggested gender nonconformity was a mental illness. In May 2014, Secretary of Defense Hagel said his department's policy with respect to transgender service should be reviewed "continually". Later in May, the ban on Medicare coverage for gender reassignment surgery, which had been in place since 1981, was lifted in response to a lawsuit filed in 2013 on behalf of Denee Mallon, a 74-year-old transgender Army veteran. With the end of the ban on openly gay service members, Air Force secretary Deborah Lee James stated the ban on transgender personnel "is likely to come under review in the next year or so" in a December interview.

Also in May 2014, the Williams Institute published a research brief estimating 15,500 transgender people were serving on active duty or in the Guard/Reserves, and an additional 134,300 transgender people were either veterans or retired from the Guard/Reserves. The brief was based on a six-month survey of over 6,000 transgender people in 2008–09 asking (in part) if they had ever served in the armed forces, or had been denied entry because they were transgender.

==== 2015 ====
In February 2015, during his first trip as United States Secretary of Defense, Ash Carter was asked about the service of transgender troops, to which he replied:

... we want to make our conditions and experience of service as attractive as possible to our best people in our country. And I'm very open-minded about [it] – otherwise about what their personal lives and proclivities are, provided they can do what we need them to do for us. That's the important criteria. Are they going to be excellent service members? And I don't think anything but their suitability for service should preclude them.

Days later, the White House echoed Secretary Carter's support of transgender service personnel.

In mid-March 2015, a doctor and major in the United States Army Medical Corps named Jamie Lee Henry became the first known active-duty Army officer to come out as transgender, and the first and only active-duty service member who has changed her name and gender within the United States military, to her knowledge and to the knowledge of other trans activists. In September 2022, Henry and her wife were indicted on conspiracy charges for allegedly attempting to transfer confidential military medical information to Russia.

Starting in March 2015, the Army, Air Force, and Navy issued directives protecting transgender soldiers from dismissal. The Army issued a directive that protected transgender soldiers from being dismissed by mid-level officers by requiring the decision for discharge to be made by the service's top civilian for personnel matters. The Air Force stated that for enlisted airmen, there was no outright grounds for discharge for anyone with gender dysphoria or who identified as transgender, and that a person would only be subject to eviction from the Air Force if his or her condition interfered with their potential deployment or performance on active duty. Navy secretary Ray Mabus signed a memorandum directed to the chief of Naval operations and commandant of the Marine Corps stating: "Effective immediately, separations initiated under the provisions of the reference for service members with a diagnosis or history of gender dysphoria, who identify themselves as transgender, or who have taken steps to externalize the condition, must be forwarded to the assistant secretary of the Navy (manpower and reserve affairs) for decision."

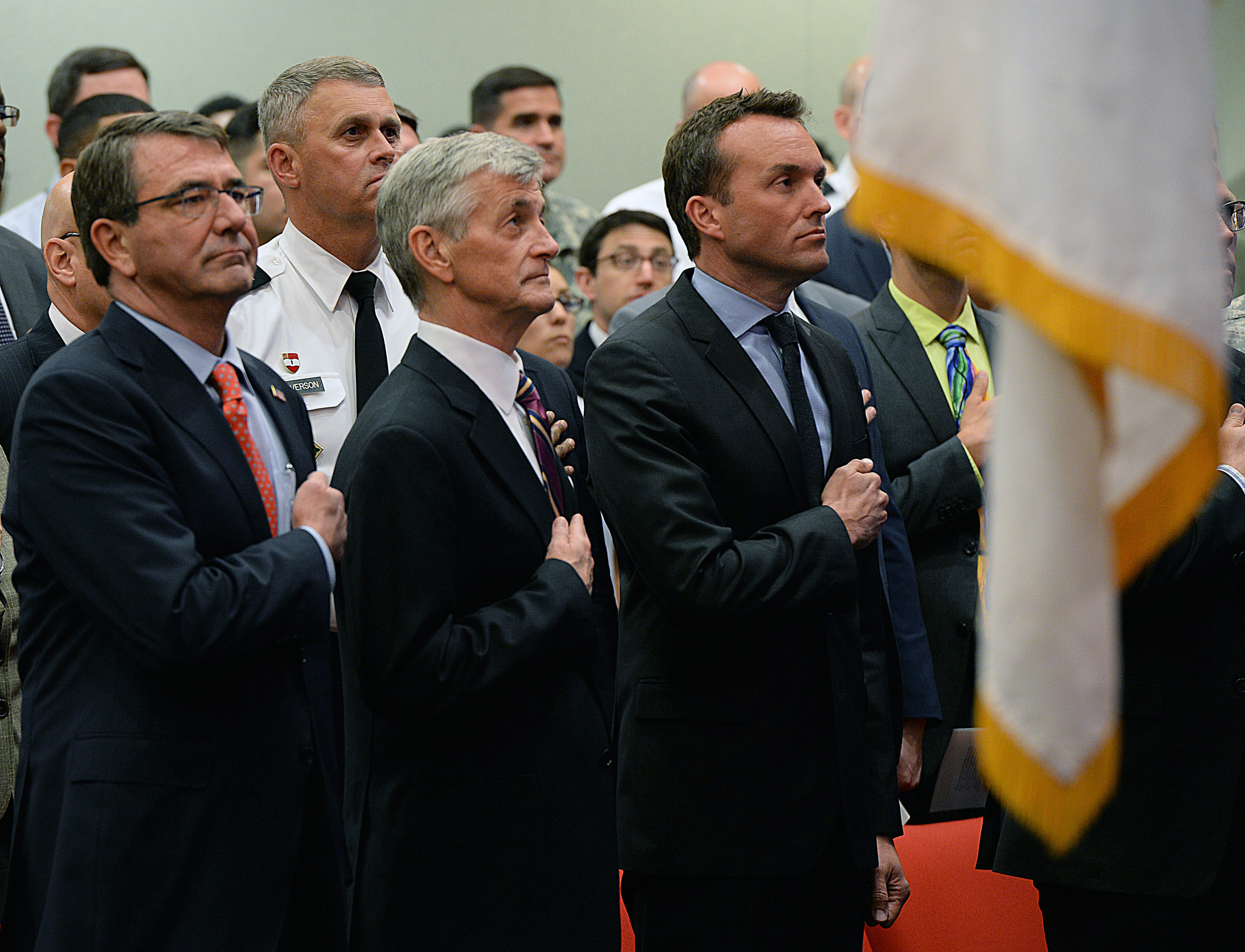
L–R: Secretary of Defense Ashton Carter, Secretary of the Army John M. McHugh, and Chief of Staff of the Department of Defense Eric Fanning render honors at the LGBT Pride Month ceremony in the Pentagon Auditorium on June 9, 2015.

In the wake of these directives, in July 2015, Secretary Carter ordered the creation of a Pentagon working group "to study over the next six months the policy and readiness implications of welcoming transgender persons to serve openly". He also stated that all decisions to dismiss troops with gender dysphoria would be handled by the Pentagon's acting Under Secretary of Defense for Personnel and Readiness, Brad Carson. Carson would later resign his position in April 2016 following a February 2016 Senate confirmation hearing where he clashed publicly with senators Jim Inhofe [R-OK] and John McCain [R-AZ], but he delivered an implementation plan to allow open service by transgender people for Secretary Carter's review as one of his final accomplishments as acting Undersecretary. Although the working group had a January 2016 deadline to finish evaluating the change, there still was no official policy in place by May 2016, and the Pentagon's acting personnel chief stated it would take "months, but not large numbers of months" to finalize transgender military service policy details.

The American Medical Association approved a resolution opposing the ban on openly transgender troops in June 2015. "Transgender Members of the U.S. Military" were listed as one of the nine runners-up for Person of the Year by The Advocate in November 2015.

==== 2016 ====
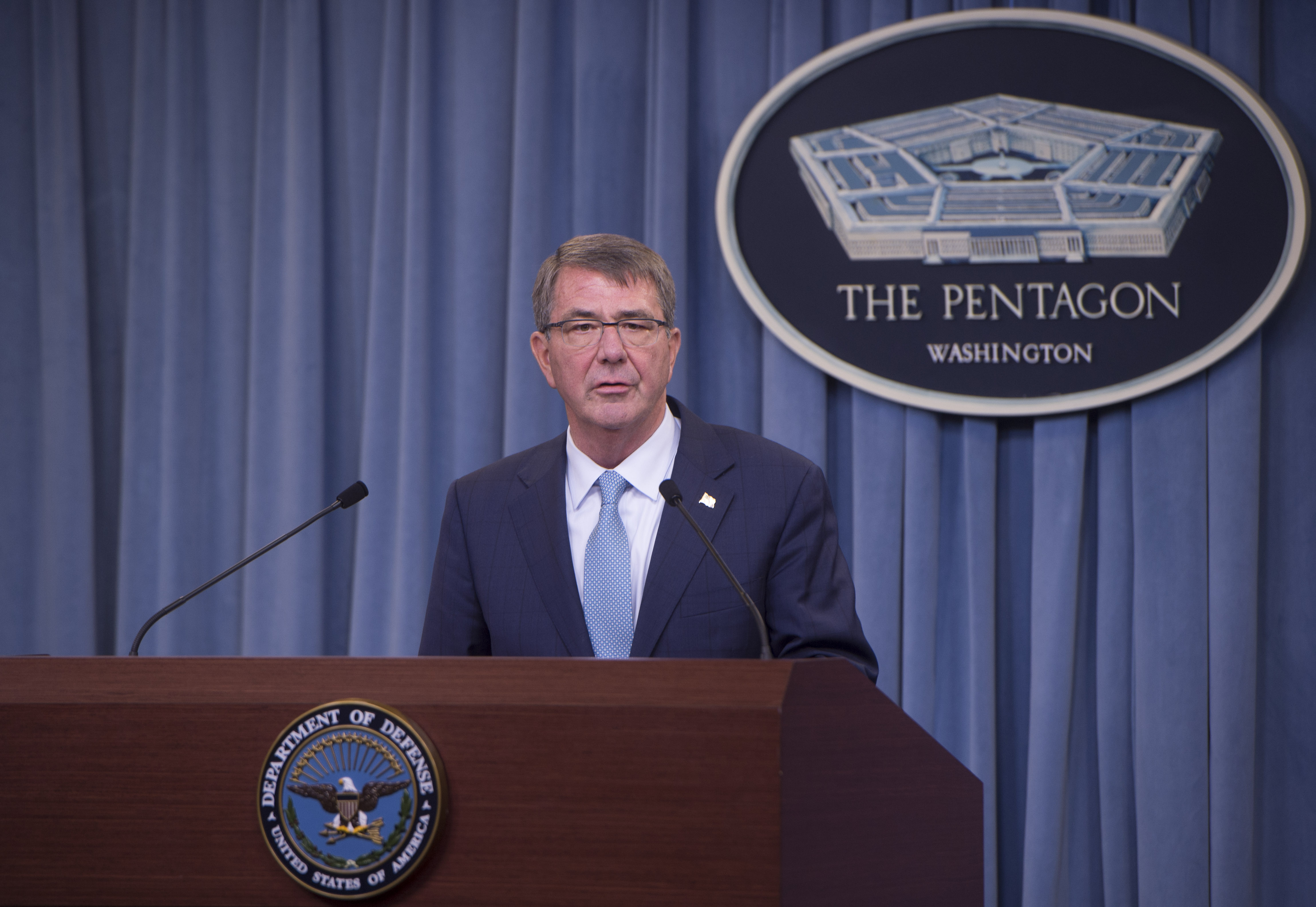
Secretary Carter announces the end of the ban on transgender personnel in the United States military on June 30, 2016

[...] Americans who want to serve and can meet our standards should be afforded the opportunity to compete to do so. After all, our all-volunteer force is built upon having the most qualified Americans. And the profession of arms is based on honor and trust.
Army Chief of Staff General Milley recently reminded us of this, when he said, and I quote him, "The United States Army is open to all Americans who meet the standard, regardless of who they are. Embedded within our Constitution is that very principle, that all Americans are free and equal. And we as an Army are sworn to protect and defend that very principle. And we are sworn to even die for that principle. So if we in uniform are willing to die for that principle, then we in uniform should be willing to live by that principle." That's General Milley.

— Ashton Carter, Remarks on Ending the Ban on Transgender Service in the U.S. Military

The Office of the Under Secretary of Defense for Personnel and Readiness asked the RAND National Defense Research Institute to study the implications of transgender service members, including identifying the health care needs of transgender service members, the effect on troop readiness, and the experience of the foreign military forces which allow transgender members to serve openly. RAND estimated in a report published June 2016 that 2,450 active-duty and 1,510 reserve personnel were transgender. Based on the percentage of transgender people seeking gender transition-related medical treatment using private health insurance, RAND further estimated that 29 to 129 active-duty service members would seek transition-related health care benefits per year, increasing military health system costs by 0.13% of the $6 billion military health system annual budget, at a total annual estimated cost of $2.4 to $8.4 million. Readiness was estimated at a decrease of 0.0015% of total available labor-years due to recuperation, and unit cohesion was determined to be minimally affected. The RAND study focused on the service history of transgender personnel in Australia, Canada, Israel, and the United Kingdom, concluding, "in no case was there any evidence of an effect on the operational effectiveness, operational readiness, or cohesion of the force." RAND concluded that calling for "strong leadership support", providing diversity-related "education and training to the entire force", and developing and enforcing "a clear anti-harassment policy" were key best practices. The report had been completed in March 2016, and transgender advocates had accused Secretary Carter of delaying its release because it found there were few obstacles to allowing transgender troops to serve openly. A copy of the RAND report was leaked to and published by The New York Times in May 2016. The RAND cost estimate agreed with an earlier study by Aaron Belkin, who estimated the annual cost of transition-related care would be $5.6 million. On May 23, 2016, the Department of Defense observed the first LGBT Pride Month with openly transgender service members.

On June 30, 2016, Secretary Ash Carter made an official announcement and published Directive-Type Memo 16-005 (DTM 16-005), declaring:

- Effective immediately:
  - [N]o otherwise qualified Service member may be involuntarily separated, discharged or denied reenlistment or continuation of service, solely on the basis of their gender identity.
  - It is the Department's position, consistent with the U.S. Attorney General's opinion, that discrimination based on gender identity is a form of sex discrimination.
- By October 1, 2016:
  - A training handbook will be developed and published for transgender Service members, commanders, the force, and medical professionals. In addition, guidance will be published for medical care and treatment of transgender Service members.
  - Transgender Service members will be allowed to transition gender while serving in accordance with Department of Defense Instruction 1300.28 (also published on June 30).
  - "The Military Health System will be required to provide transgender Service members with all medically necessary care related to gender transition, based on the guidance that is issued."
- By November 1, 2016:
  - Implementing guidance and a training and education plan will be issued by each branch of the military, including a scheduled completion date.
- By July 1, 2017:
  - Training of the force regarding transgender Service members shall be completed.
  - The process of accession (entrance to military service, through enlistment, Service Academies, ROTC, or any similar program) will be opened to transgender individuals, provided they meet the same physical and mental fitness standards as any other applicant.
  - The initial accession policy requires "an individual to have completed any medical treatment that their doctor has determined is necessary in connection with their gender transition, and to have been stable in their preferred gender for 18 months, as certified by their doctor, before they can enter the military".

The Department of Defense (DoD) Instruction 1300.28, "In-service transition for transgender service members", published on June 30, 2016, provided administrative and medical guidance for currently-serving military personnel seeking gender transition. On September 20, 2016, a commander's training handbook was published by the Department of Defense, along with a medical protocol and guidance to change a service member's gender, entitled "Transgender Service in the U.S. Military". On October 3, 2016, non-active duty service members became eligible for the Military Health System to provide behavioral health care and hormone treatments, but not sex reassignment surgery.

On October 26, 10 soldiers in the United States Army became the first to openly petition for a sex change. Also on October 26, the Department of Defense ruled that any form of discrimination against transgender youth was incompatible with an Executive Order issued by then U.S. President Bill Clinton in the year 2000 which directed federal agencies that conduct educational activities to comply with Title IX of the Education Amendments of 1972 and issued a memorandum ordering military youth schools to immediately comply with the 2000 Executive Order.

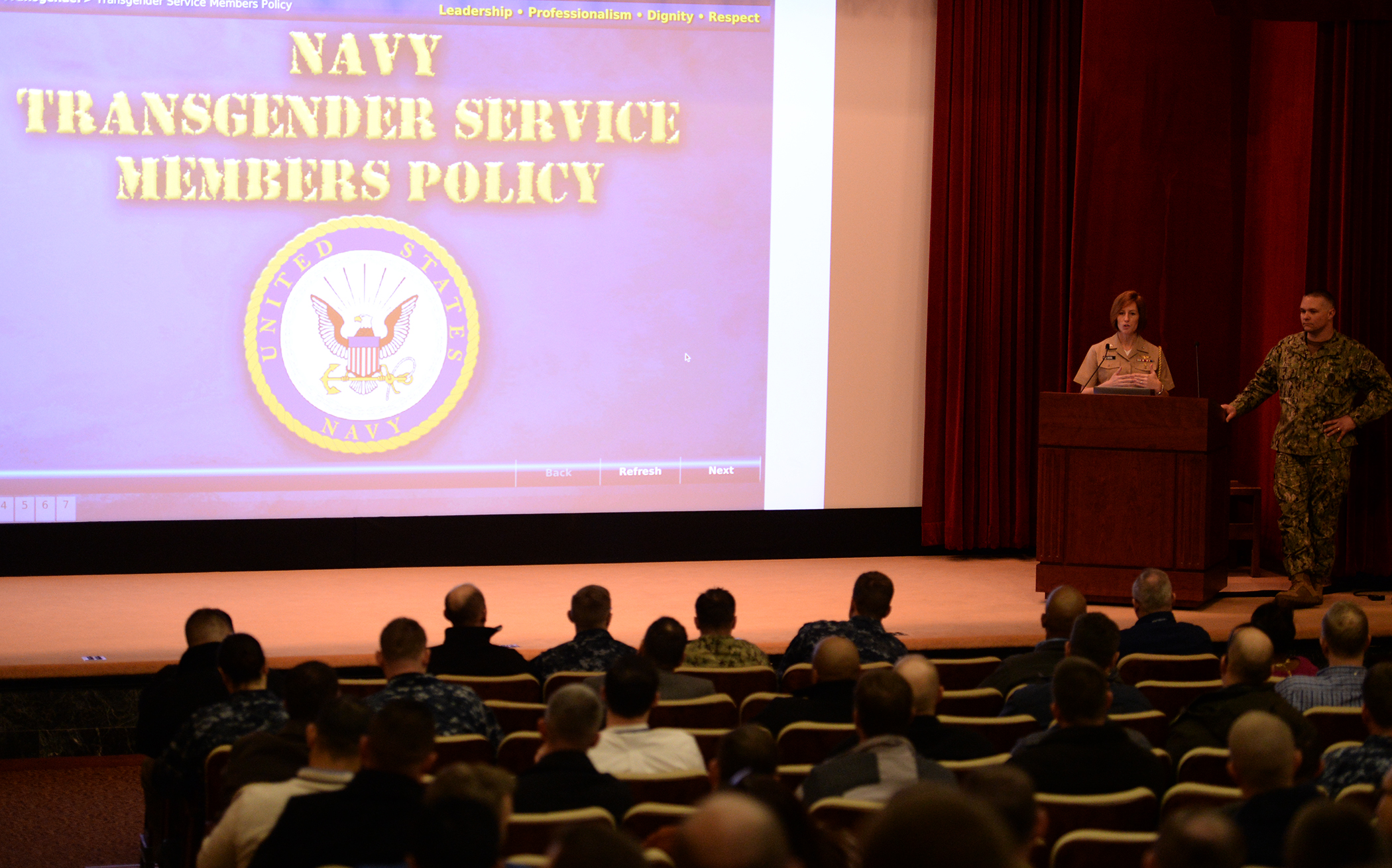
Capt. Tamara Graham and CMDCM Craig Cole conduct mandatory Navy transgender policy training at the Naval War College in Newport, Rhode Island (January 10, 2017; photograph by Ezra Elliott)

On October 16, 2016, the United States Air Force published its official guidance policy for transgender individuals. The policy announced their support of transgender airmen and that any bias against them would not be tolerated. This allowed transgender individuals to openly serve in the Air Force, along with outlawing any discharge or denying reenlistment based solely on gender identity. The policy also provided medical protocol and assistance for any service member that wished to change their identity.

The United States Army also followed suit and issued its guidance policy for transgender individuals on November 1.

On November 7, 2016, the Navy released its official guidance policy for transgender individuals. The policy allowed any individual regardless of race, gender, or sexual orientation to become a sailor if they can meet Navy standards. Current Navy sailors can transition genders with a diagnosis from a military medical provider stating that the transition is medically necessary for the individual. Policy was adjusted to increase facility privacy and urinalysis protocol. The protocol for physical readiness was unchanged.

On November 10, 2016, 55 sailors in the United States Navy and 48 airpersons in the United States Air Force publicly petitioned for their respective gender confirmation surgeries. On November 29, 2016, the United States Department of Defense Directive 1350.2, the United States Department of Defense Military Equal Opportunity Program, was updated to include gender identity.

=== First Trump administration (2017-2020) ===
==== January 2017–July 2017 ====
From January 20, 2017, to July 25, 2017, the Trump administration's policy was to maintain the existing policy allowing transgender individuals to serve openly in the military while delaying the implementation of enlistment policies for further review. On February 25, 2017, the Military Times learned that some time after Trump was sworn into the presidency, Defense Department schools stopped enforcing an October 26, 2016 Department of Defense ruling which had found that any form of discrimination against transgender youth was incompatible with an Executive Order 13160 of June 23, 2000 issued by U.S. President Bill Clinton in 2000 (which itself directed federal agencies that conduct educational activities to comply with Title IX of the Education Amendments of 1972) and issued a memorandum ordering military schools to immediately comply with the Clinton-era order.

In April 2017, President Trump nominated Army veteran and Tennessee State Senator Mark Green as his second choice for Secretary of the Army. Green was criticized for prior remarks he had made before the Chattanooga Tea Party in September 2016, including his assertion, "if you poll the psychiatrists, they're going to tell you that transgender is a disease." Green withdrew his nomination in May amid strong opposition to his nomination from LGBT advocates, among others, including Daniel Feehan, Principal Deputy Assistant Secretary of Defense for Readiness under the Obama administration, who said Green's prior statements were of "great concern towards military readiness" and could immediately impact unit cohesion. On May 16, 2017, a letter that was signed by dozens of right-leaning groups pushed for banning transgender individuals from the United States military.

On June 2, 2017, the Department of Defense observed the first LGBT Pride Month since the repeal of the ban on open military service by transgender service members in the U.S. military.

On July 13, 2017, Rep. Hartzler introduced House Amendment 183, an amendment to ban on funding gender reassignment surgeries and medical treatments for transgender military personnel in the NDAA, which was voted down 209–214 when 24 Republicans joined 190 Democrats in opposing the proposal. Before the vote, Secretary Mattis called Hartzler to ask her to withdraw the amendment. After the amendment was defeated, Representative Trent Franks (R-AZ) stated "it seems to me, and all due respect to everyone, that if someone wants to come to the military, potentially risk their life to save the country, that they should probably decide whether they're a man or woman before they do that." Attempts by Franks and others to insert a provision banning the funding in the rules governing a Pentagon spending package failed following pressure for attempting to circumvent regular order. Republican House leaders then sought direct intervention from the White House. Chief strategist Steve Bannon encouraged President Trump to deal with the matter now and played a role in pushing Trump to move ahead with banning transgender individuals from the military, despite the ongoing Pentagon review.

==== July 2017–2018 ====
On July 26, 2017, President Donald Trump tweeted:

After consultation with my Generals and military experts, please be advised that the United States Government will not accept or allow Transgender individuals to serve in any capacity in the U.S. Military. Our military must be focused on decisive and overwhelming victory and cannot be burdened with the tremendous medical costs and disruption that transgender in the military would entail. Thank you.

— Donald J. Trump, via Twitter, July 26, 2017

According to Politico and a senior administration official, President Trump had always planned to ban transgender individuals from the military and prohibit the Pentagon funding gender reassignment surgeries, but the fight over prohibiting Pentagon funding gender reassignment surgeries had hastened Trump's decision. According to numerous congressional and White House sources, the tweet was a last-ditch attempt to save a $1.6 billion (~$2.02 billion in 2025) border wall funding provision in the Make America Secure Appropriations Act, 2018.

Trump was criticized for making statements that contradicted the conclusions of the 2016 RAND study. Political commentator Richard Kim observed President Trump's tweets were "a sop to the far-right evangelical faction" in the House of Representatives led by Hartzler, who had threatened the funding for President Trump's planned United States-Mexico border wall if the military continued to spend health care funds for medical treatment of gender dysphoria.

Due to the haste of the announcement, White House officials were unable to answer questions on how the proposed ban would be implemented, or what would happen to those personnel who were openly transgender. Secretary Mattis was only notified about the announcement on July 25. Similarly, Joint Chiefs of Staff Chairman Joseph Dunford noted his surprise at the announcement, saying, "When asked, I will state I was not consulted" in emails dated July 27, 2017 leaked to BuzzFeed News in February 2018. The New York Times noted that the move also marked "a stark turnabout for Mr. Trump, who billed himself during the campaign as an ally of gay, lesbian, bisexual and transgender people". After the president's tweets, Hartzler stated in an interview, "this was the right call by our commander in chief, to make sure every defense dollar goes toward meeting the threats that we are facing in the world ... [T]he entire policy ... is a detriment to our readiness."

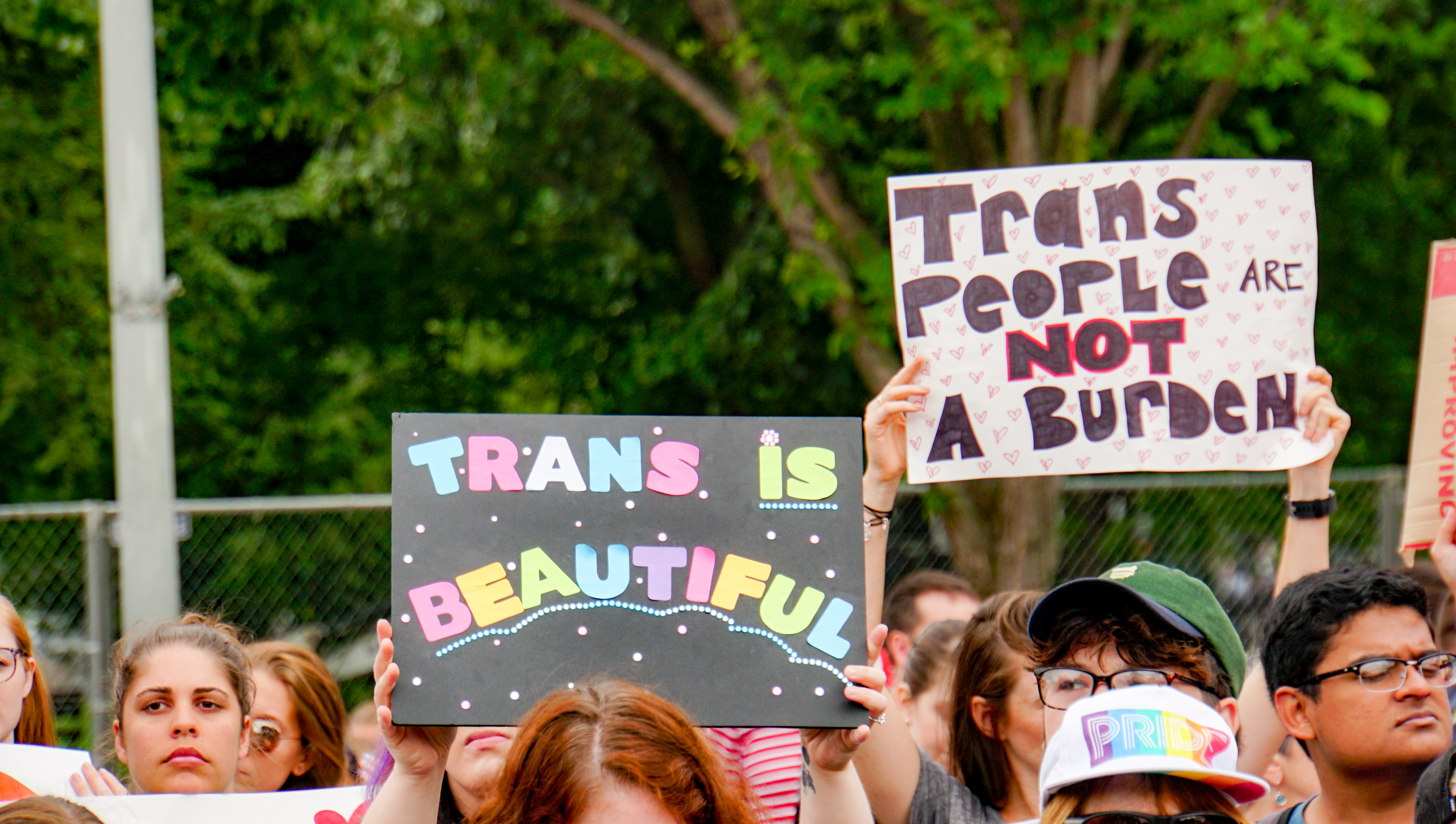
The 'Stop Transgender Military Ban' rally outside the White House was held July 29, 2017

The announced reinstatement of the ban was followed by protests in New York City, Washington DC, and San Francisco on July 26, 2017, and a rally was held in front of the White House on July 29. As Trump had not yet outlined specific policy changes, Chairman Dunford announced on July 27, 2017, "there will be no modifications to the current policy until the president's direction has been received by the secretary of defense and the secretary has issued implementation guidance." Senator Kirsten Gillibrand (D-NY) introduced an amendment to NDAA on July 27, 2017, which would prohibit the involuntary discharge, cessation of health care benefits, or changes in responsibility or position (other than promotion, routine reassignment, or deployment) of transgender troops until sixty days after Congress received the results of the six-month study proposed by Secretary Mattis.

On August 1, 2017, the Palm Center released a letter signed by 56 retired generals and admirals, opposing the proposed ban on transgender military service members. The letter stated that if implemented, the ban "would cause significant disruptions, deprive the military of mission-critical talent and compromise the integrity of transgender troops who would be forced to live a lie, as well as non-transgender peers who would be forced to choose between reporting their comrades or disobeying policy". The commandant of the United States Coast Guard, Admiral Paul F. Zukunft, made a personal commitment to "not turn my back ... not break faith" with transgender service members in the Coast Guard on August 1, 2017. At the time, it was noted the Coast Guard was part of the Department of Homeland Security, not the Department of Defense, and it was not clear how the proposed ban on transgender service members would affect the Coast Guard.

Presidential Memorandum of August 25, 2017

In my judgment, the previous Administration failed to identify a sufficient basis to conclude that terminating the Departments' longstanding policy and practice [prohibiting openly transgender individuals from serving in the United States military] would not hinder military effectiveness and lethality, disrupt unit cohesion, or tax military resources, and there remain meaningful concerns that further study is needed to ensure that continued implementation of last year's policy change would not have those negative effects.

— President Donald J. Trump, Presidential Memorandum of August 25, 2017

In late August, a memorandum was being prepared which would require Secretary Mattis to enforce the ban on transgender personnel within six months. Aaron Belkin, director of the Palm Center, criticized the forthcoming memo for imposing a double standard on transgender troops, calling it "a recipe for disruption, distraction, and waste". On August 25, 2017, President Trump signed a presidential memorandum identifying the guidelines for renewing the ban. In the memo, President Trump stated the ban on transgender personnel in the military will remain effective until "the Secretary of Defense, after consulting with the Secretary of Homeland Security, provides a recommendation to the contrary that I find convincing", ignoring the conclusions of the 2016 RAND study, and further called for a "halt [to] all use of DoD or DHS resources to fund sex reassignment surgical procedures for military personnel", effective March 23, 2018. The memo further required the Secretary of Defense and Secretary of Homeland Security to submit an implementation plan by February 21, 2018. Senator Tammy Duckworth [D-IL] and Representative Nancy Pelosi [D-CA] released separate statements condemning the memorandum; Pelosi stated the memo directed "the Pentagon to hurt and humiliate" transgender service personnel and questioned whether "prejudice, not the national defense" was motivating the action.

If you are willing to risk your life for our country and you can do the job, you should be able to serve–no matter your gender identity or sexual orientation. Anything else is not just discriminatory, it is disruptive to our military and it is counterproductive to our national security. If the President enacts this ban, which would harm our military readiness, the Democratic and Republican Members of Congress who oppose this discrimination must enact legislation that prevents it from taking effect.

— Senator Tammy Duckworth [D-IL], August 24, 2017 statement

Two weeks before sending his directive to the Pentagon, Trump said, "I think I'm doing the military a great favor" by banning trans military members. Representative Donald McEachin (D-VA) was the lead author of a letter to Secretary Mattis on October 10, 2017, requesting records of discussions or correspondence between the White House and the Pentagon that would document or justify that Trump was "doing the military a great favor", including any substantiation of requests for a ban on transgender soldiers originating from senior military or Department of Defense personnel. The letter, which questioned "whether the president, his national security team, and military leaders are actively coordinating policy with one another, or whether the president's transgender ban announcement reflected a breakdown in communication", was co-signed by 114 other Democratic Representatives.

On August 29, 2017, Secretary Mattis announced that currently serving transgender troops would be allowed to remain in the armed services, pending further study. Mattis stated he would set up a panel of experts from the Departments of Defense and Homeland Security to provide recommendations on implementing the President's policy direction. Secretary Mattis formalized the interim policy in an interim guidance issued on September 18, 2017. The interim guidance, which expires no later than February 21, 2018, essentially freezes the policies that were in place before the Presidential Memorandum of August 25. Accession of transgender individuals is still banned per the procedures dated April 28, 2010. Transgender soldiers will not be denied reenlistment, and may not be involuntarily discharged solely on the basis of their gender identity. Medical treatment will continue for service members with a gender dysphoria diagnosis, with the exception that no new sex reassignment surgeries will be permitted after March 22, 2018, unless necessary to protect the health of an individual who has already begun treatment. Mattis named the Deputy Secretary of Defense, Patrick M. Shanahan, and the Vice Chairman of the Joint Chiefs of Staff, General Paul Selva, to head the advisory panel of experts tasked with providing recommendations.

Despite the Interim Guidance, the Presidential Memorandum has attracted significant legal and legislative opposition:

- Jane Doe v. Trump, a lawsuit filed by GLAD and NCLR on August 9, 2017. A preliminary injunction against the Presidential Memorandum was granted in part on October 30, 2017, but the court vacated this injunction on January 4, 2019. (Injunctions granted by other courts remained in effect.)
- Stone v. Trump, a lawsuit filed by the ACLU of Maryland on August 28, 2017. Judge Marvin J. Garbis granted a preliminary injunction against the Presidential Memorandum in full on November 21, 2017.
- Karnoski v. Trump, a lawsuit filed by Lambda Legal on August 28, 2017. A preliminary injunction against the Presidential Memorandum was granted in full on December 11, 2017.
- Stockman v. Trump, a lawsuit filed by Equality California on September 5, 2017. A preliminary injunction against the Presidential Memorandum was granted in full on December 22, 2017.
- S. 1820 (September 15, 2017) and H.R. 4041 (October 12, 2017), bipartisan bills in the Senate and House, respectively, to prohibit the involuntary separation or denial of re-enlistment of military personnel solely on the basis of gender identity.

In November 2017, the Defense Health Agency for the first time approved payment for sex reassignment surgery for an active-duty U.S. military service member. The patient, an infantry soldier who identifies as a woman, had already begun a course of treatment for gender reassignment. The procedure, which the treating doctor deemed medically necessary, was performed on November 14, 2017, at a non-military hospital, since military hospitals lacked the requisite surgical expertise.

The accession of transgender individuals was scheduled to be allowed by July 1, 2017, per DTM 16-005, but military leaders asked for a one to two-year delay on accessions, stating more time was needed to review entrance standards and to ensure the success of transgender individuals. In response, Secretary Mattis issued a six-month delay on accessions. With Judge Kollar-Kotelly's decision on October 30, 2017, to enjoin the Presidential Memorandum of August 25, the accession policy reverts to the six-month delay, and the accession of transgender individuals into military service is set to begin on January 1, 2018. Because Secretary Mattis had previously delayed accession by six months in June, the United States Department of Justice Civil Division filed a motion for clarification asking if Secretary Mattis had independent authority to modify DTM 16-005. In a November 27, 2017 order, Judge Kollar-Kotelly stated "Any action by any of the Defendants that changes this status quo is preliminarily enjoined." As a named defendant, Secretary Mattis does not have authority to change the preliminary injunction order of October 30, which reverts policy to the status quo prior to the Presidential Memorandum of August 25, and accessions are set to start on January 1, 2018. On December 11, Judge Kollar-Kotelly denied the motion for partial stay, noting it took three weeks for USDOJ to file the first appeal, and that she "would have expected Defendants to act with more alacrity" if the January 1, 2018 deadline for accession was unmanageable.

USDOJ filed for emergency stays with the D.C. Circuit (on December 11, for Doe), the Fourth Circuit (on December 14, for Stone), and the Ninth Circuit (on December 15, for Karnoski), seeking to either allow Secretary Mattis to institute a second delay on accession, or narrowing the scope of the injunction to allow accession of only those individuals ruled to have standing. On December 21, 2017, a panel of three judges on the Fourth Circuit denied USDOJ's emergency motion for a stay on Judge Garbis's order. The next day, a panel of three judges on the D.C. Circuit also denied the USDOJ emergency stay motion on Judge Kollar-Kotelly's order. On December 29, USDOJ filed to withdraw their appeal from the Ninth Circuit, which was granted.

Beginning on January 1, 2018, transgender individuals were allowed to join the U.S. military if a licensed medical provider certified that the applicant completed all medical treatment associated with gender transition, has been stable in the preferred gender for 18 months, and if the applicant has completed sex reassignment or genital reconstruction surgery, that 18 months have elapsed since the most recent surgery, no functional limitations or complications persist, and no additional surgeries are required. In February 2018, the Pentagon confirmed that, for the first time, a transgender recruit had signed a contract to enter the U.S. military, joining an estimated 4,000 already serving.

The Presidential Memorandum of August 25, 2017 required Defense Secretary Mattis to provide his recommendations to the President no later than February 21, 2018, but the meeting was postponed. On February 22, The Washington Post reported that Mattis was set to recommend that transgender sailors and soldiers be allowed to continue serving in the military, according to anonymous officials familiar with Mattis's plans. Also on February 22, in Karnoski v. Trump, a motion was filed to compel disclosure as prior documents filed by USDOJ stated the "'new policy' on transgender service" would be released on February 21.

- "Transgender persons with a history or diagnosis of gender dysphoria are disqualified from military service, except under the following limited circumstances:"

The memorandum providing the recommendations from Mattis, dated February 22, 2018, was released March 23 alongside the supporting report in a document filed for Karnoski v. Trump. Mattis explained he had formed "a Panel of Experts comprised of senior uniformed and civilian Defense Department and U.S. Coast Guard leaders" to "provide its best military advice, based on increasing the lethality and readiness of America's armed forces", which authored the report attached to the Mattis memorandum. The Panel was convened on September 14, 2017, and met 13 times over a span of 90 days. The names of those on the Panel were not released, but membership was stated by role to include "the Under Secretaries of the Military Departments (or officials performing their duties), the Armed Services' Vice Chiefs (including the Vice Commandant of the U.S. Coast Guard), and the Senior Enlisted Advisors". Meetings were led "by the Under Secretary of Defense for Personnel and Readiness or an official performing those duties". That leadership post was held by Anthony Kurta during the majority of the Panel's tenure until Robert Wilkie was sworn in during November 2017.

Anonymous sources stated that Vice President Mike Pence, Ryan T. Anderson, a research fellow at The Heritage Foundation and author of When Harry Became Sally: Responding to the Transgender Moment, and Tony Perkins, leader of the Family Research Council, led the creation of the report. In summary, Mattis recommended:

- "Transgender persons with a history or diagnosis of gender dysphoria are disqualified from military service, except under the following limited circumstances:
  1. 36 consecutive months of stability "in their biological sex prior to accession"
  2. For currently serving personnel who are diagnosed with gender dysphoria after accession, "if they do not require a change of gender and remain deployable" they may continue to serve.
  3. For currently serving personnel who were diagnosed with gender dysphoria under the previous policy (outlined by Ash Carter) and prior to the effective date of the new policy, they may continue to serve "in their preferred gender and receive medically necessary treatment for gender dysphoria"
- "Transgender persons who require or have undergone gender transition are disqualified from military service."
- "Transgender persons without a history or diagnosis of gender dysphoria, who are otherwise qualified for service, may serve, like all other Service members, in their biological sex."

The Mattis memorandum criticized the prior RAND report, stating "It referred to limited and heavily caveated data to support its conclusions, glossed over the impacts of healthcare costs, readiness, and unit cohesion, and erroneously relied on the selective experiences of foreign militaries with different operational requirements than our own." However, it was also reported that unlike Trump, Mattis preferred to keep transgender people in the military.

For decades, military standards relating to mental health, physical health, and the physiological differences between men and women operated to preclude from military service transgender persons who desired to live and work as the opposite gender.

— Panel of Experts, Department of Defense Report and Recommendations on Military Service by Transgender Persons (Feb 2018)

The Department of Defense (DoD) report attached to the Mattis memorandum provides recommendations consistent with those summarized in the Mattis memorandum. For the third "limited circumstance" allowing the retention of those who began openly serving as transgender people under the Carter policy, the report concludes with the threat: "should [the Department of Defense] decision to exempt those Service members be used by a court as a basis for invalidating the entire policy, this exemption instead is and should be deemed severable from the rest of the policy", which would expel that grandfathered class of service members. One journalist called the report "an attempt to retroactively justify Trump's ban [on transgender military service] by lending it a sheen of reason and legitimacy".

The DoD report notes that DoDI 6130.03 provides "baseline accession medical standards" and touts that it "is reviewed every three to four years by the Accession Medical Standards Working Group" but later notes the "standards were consistent with DSM-III" (published in 1980) and "[d]ue to challenges associated with updating and publishing a new iteration of DoDI 6130.03, the DoDI's terminology has not changed to reflect the changes in the DSM". The DoD report was critical of the RAND report, saying that RAND had "failed to analyze the impact at the micro level of allowing gender transition by individuals with gender dysphoria". Specifically, RAND "did not examine the potential impact on unit readiness, perceptions of fairness and equity, personnel safety, and reasonable expectations of privacy at the unit and sub-unit levels, all of which are critical to unit cohesion", did not "meaningfully address the significant mental health problems that accompany gender dysphoria", and did not address "the scope of the scientific uncertainty regarding whether gender transition treatment fully remedies those problems".

The DoD report selectively quotes the DSM-5 to define gender dysphoria as "a 'marked incongruence between one's experience/expressed gender and assigned gender, of at least 6 months duration,' that is manifested in various specified ways", which omits the second component of a gender dysphoria diagnosis. According to the American Psychiatric Association, "gender dysphoria diagnosis [in adolescents and adults] involves a difference between one's experienced/expressed gender and assigned gender, and significant distress or problems functioning. It lasts at least six months and is shown by at least two of the following [list of specific symptoms]". According to the summary of DSM-5 paraphrased by the Centers for Medicare & Medicaid Services, "Gender nonconformity itself [is] not considered to be a mental disorder".

In fact, there is a global medical consensus that such care is reliable, safe, and effective. An expectation of certainty is an unrealistic and counterproductive standard of evidence for health policy–whether civilian or military–because even the most well-established medical treatments could not satisfy that standard. Indeed, setting certainty as a standard suggests an inability to refute the research. A wide body of reputable, peer-reviewed research has demonstrated to psychological and health experts that treatments for gender dysphoria are effective.

— Joycelyn Elders and David Satcher, former U.S. Surgeons General, Statement, March 28, 2018

The DoD report goes on to cast doubt on the efficacy of treating gender dysphoria: "the available scientific evidence on the extent to which such treatments fully remedy all of the issues associated with gender dysphoria is unclear. Nor do any of these studies account for the added stress of military life, deployments, and combat." It cites several references to support this conclusion: a study published in 2016 by the Centers for Medicare & Medicaid Services (the "CMS" study), another published in 2011 studying the experience in Sweden (the "Swedish study"), one from Mayo Clinic researchers, and a study published in the Hayes Medical Technology Directory (the "Hayes Directory").

The scope of the CMS study was limited to determining whether a national coverage decision could be made for gender reassignment surgery. CMS did not assess specific surgery types, nor did CMS "analyze the clinical evidence for counseling or hormone therapy treatments for gender dysphoria". In an interview published in 2015, the lead author of the "Swedish study" stated "People who misuse the study always omit the fact that the study clearly states that it is not an evaluation of gender dysphoria treatment. If we look at the literature, we find that several recent studies conclude that WPATH Standards of Care compliant treatment decrease gender dysphoria and improves mental health." The Mayo Clinic study concluded that gender dysphoria treatment was effective. In a joint statement released on March 28, former Surgeons General Joycelyn Elders and David Satcher were "troubled that the Defense department's report on transgender military service has mischaracterized the robust body of peer-reviewed research on the effectiveness of transgender medical care as demonstrating 'considerable scientific uncertainty.'" A letter from American Medical Association CEO James Madara addressed to Secretary Mattis on April 3, 2018, also criticized the new policy, stating "there is no medically valid reason–including a diagnosis of gender dysphoria–to exclude transgender individuals from military service. Transgender individuals have served, and continue to serve, our country with honor, and we believe they should be allowed to continue doing so."

The DoD report also asserts that using a person's gender identity, rather than their anatomy is inherently unfair since "sex-based standards are based on legitimate biological differences between males and females, it follows that a person's physical biology should dictate which standards apply", going on to fault the "variability and fluidity of gender transition" and providing examples such as "allowing a biological male to meet the female physical fitness and body fat standards and to compete against females in gender-specific physical training and athletic competition, [would undermine] fairness (or perceptions of fairness) because males competing as females will likely score higher on the female test than on the male test and possibly compromise safety". One study has shown that transgender female distance runners have no speed advantage over cisgender women after one year of hormone therapy.

On March 23, 2018, the Trump administration issued a new memorandum stating that Mattis had recommended "transgender persons with a history or diagnosis of gender dysphoria–individuals who the policies state may require substantial medical treatment, including medications and surgery–are disqualified from military service except under certain limited circumstances." Among other declarations, the new memorandum revoked the prior memo of August 25, 2017 and authorized Secretaries Mattis and Kirstjen Nielsen to "implement any appropriate policies concerning military service by transgender individuals".

Based on the new memorandum, in each of the four court cases (Doe, Stone, Karnoski, and Stockman), USDOJ has filed motions to dissolve the preliminary injunctions previously imposed and impose protective orders to halt discovery. The motions to dissolve the preliminary injunctions stated "this new policy [from the Mattis memorandum of February 2018], like the Carter policy before it, turns on the medical condition of gender dysphoria and contains a nuanced set of exceptions allowing some transgender individuals, including almost every Plaintiff here, to serve" and asserted "the military's new policy is constitutional", concluding that challenges to the new policy "should not be litigated under the shadow of a preliminary injunction of a Presidential Memorandum [August 2017] that is no longer in effect".

The policy was stayed in Karnoski vs. Trump (Western District of Washington) on April 13, 2018, when the court ruled that the 2018 memorandum essentially repeated the same issues as its predecessor order from 2017, that transgender service members (and transgender individuals as a class) were a protected class entitled to strict scrutiny of adverse laws (or at worst, a quasi-suspect class), and ordered that matter continue to a full trial hearing on the legality of the proposed policy.

The Trump administration, through Solicitor General Noel Francisco, has submitted petitions of writ of certiorari to the U.S. Supreme Court in November 2018 to rule on the matter on the Karnoski, Stockman, and Doe cases prior to their final judgement, specifically seeking to reverse the stay on the order while the cases otherwise continued in their respective courts.

On January 22, 2019, in two 5-4 orders, split along ideological lines, the U.S. Supreme Court, denied the Trump administration's petition for expedited review of Karnoski v. Trump and Stockman v. Trump. (Note: Because they came to the Supreme Court on appeal by the Trump administration the correct case captions are Trump v. Karnoski and Trump v. Stockman.). The Court, however, did agree to lift preliminary injunctions issued by the Karnoski and Stockman courts while legal proceedings go forward in lower courts. The injunctions had blocked the reinstatement of restrictions on military service by transgender people. However, the U.S. Defense Department did not implement the policies set forth in the Presidential Memorandum of March 23, 2018, because the preliminary injunction issued by the federal district court in Maryland in Stone v. Trump was not considered by the Supreme Court and remains in effect. The court's five conservative justices, Chief Justice John Roberts and Justices Clarence Thomas, Samuel Alito, Neil Gorsuch, and Brett Kavanaugh supported the lifting the preliminary injunctions. Mara Keisling wrote, "The Court's extraordinary action [...] is an attack on transgender people around the nation."

The ban went into effect on April 12.

In 2019, Army Capt. Alivia Stehlik, Navy Lt. Cmdr. Blake Dremann, Army Capt. Jennifer Peace, Army Staff Sgt. Patricia King and Navy Petty Officer 3rd Class Akira Wyatt became the first openly transgender members of the United States military to testify publicly in front of Congress when they testified in front of the House Armed Services Committee in support of openly transgender people serving in the military.

==== 2019–2020 ====
Directive-type Memorandum-19-004 reinstated restrictions for transgender personnel and was signed by David L. Norquist on March 12, 2019. It came into effect April 12, 2019 and was slated to expire 11 months later.

The Trump administration policy demands adherence to sex assignment at birth as a condition for military service. Discovery of one's gender identity is a disqualifier.

The Trump administration reissued DoD Instruction 1300.28, with the new version taking effect on September 4, 2020, under the title "Military Service by Transgender Persons and Persons with Gender Dysphoria". It cancels the previous DoD Instruction of the same number, which the Obama administration had issued on October 1, 2016, under the title "In-Service Transition for Transgender Service Members".

On March 28, 2019, the United States House of Representatives passed, with 238 yeas, 185 nays, 1 present, and 8 not voting, H.Res. 124, a non-binding resolution expressing opposition to banning service in the Armed Forces by openly transgender individuals.

On June 13, 2019, celebrating Lesbian, Gay, Bisexual and Transgender Pride Month in the Pentagon Center Courtyard, Senator Tammy Duckworth attacked Directive-type Memorandum-19-004. The Pentagon celebrated Pride Month in 2019 after not doing so in 2018.

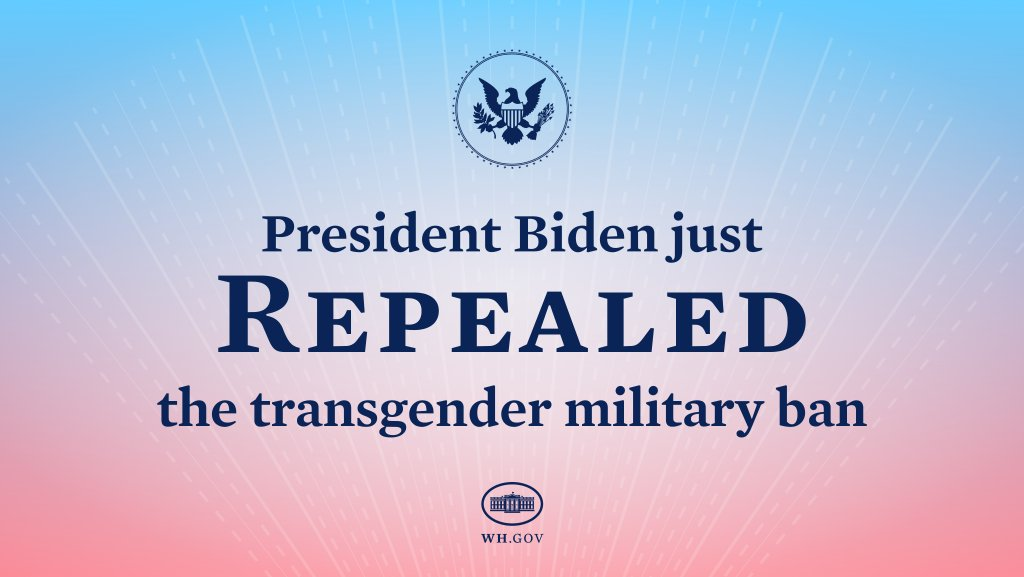
Joe Biden administration social media graphic announcing repealing the transgender military ban in January 2021.

=== Biden administration (2021–2025) ===
On Biden's first day in office on January 20, 2021, his press secretary, Jen Psaki, announced in a press conference that the President would soon reverse the government's ban on transgender people from serving openly in the military.

The ban was reversed when Biden signed the "Executive Order on Enabling All Qualified Americans to Serve Their Country in Uniform" on January 25, 2021.

Biden announced,

It is my conviction as Commander in Chief of the Armed Forces that gender identity should not be a bar to military service.

— President Joe Biden, Executive Order on Enabling All Qualified Americans to Serve Their Country in Uniform, January 25, 2021, Executive Order 14004

On March 31, 2021, the Pentagon announced new policies to take effect April 30. Under the new rules, transgender service members will not be at risk of involuntary discharge and can reenlist. The military will provide support for gender transitions, including medical care and a procedure to change gender marker.

Rachel Levine, assistant secretary in Health and Human Services, was appointed to full admiral on October 19, 2021, when she was sworn in to oversee the U.S. Public Health Service Commissioned Corps. She became the first woman to be a four-star admiral and the first transgender person to be a four-star officer in any uniformed service.

On June 22, 2023, the U.S. Army profiled Major Rachel Jones, a transgender woman, on their website and social media accounts to promote mental health care in the military.

In January 2024, Bree Fram was appointed as a colonel in the United States Space Force, becoming the highest-ranking transgender military officer in the United States Department of Defense.

In December 2024, U.S. President Joe Biden signed into law the yearly comprehensive defence authorisation bill - with a provision that explicitly legally bans gender-affirming healthcare for children and minors within military families under Tricare.

=== Second Trump administration (2025–present) ===
==== January 2025–May 2025 ====
On January 27, 2025, President Donald Trump issued Executive Order 14183. The executive order declares that identification with a gender different from one's assigned sex "conflicts with a soldier's commitment to an honorable, truthful, and disciplined lifestyle, even in one's personal life" and that the use of preferred pronouns along these lines compromises the government's ability to "establish high standards for troop readiness, lethality, cohesion, honesty, humility, uniformity, and integrity".

However, on March 18, U.S. District Court Judge Ana C. Reyes ruled in Talbott v. United States that the ban was likely unconstitutional, and she issued a preliminary injunction.

On March 23, Hegseth posted to X sarcastically referring to Reyes as a "top military planner" and calling her "she/they".

Though the Trump administration filed an emergency motion to block Reyes's injunction, the U.S. Court of Appeals for the Ninth Circuit denied the request on March 31.

==== May 2025–present ====
United States v. Shilling
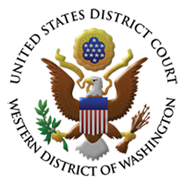
- Court: Western District of Washington
- Started: February 6, 2025
- Docket nos.: 2:25-cv-00241 (W.D. Wash.); 25-2039 (9th Cir.); 24A1030 (SCOTUS)

Case history
- Appealed to: Ninth Circuit
- Subsequent action: district ruling stayed by supreme court via shadow docket

Court membership
- Judge sitting: Benjamin Settle

On May 6, 2025, the U.S. Supreme Court stayed Judge Reyes's injunction pending the outcome of the appeal in the Ninth Circuit.

In December 2025, the U.S. Court of Appeals for the District of Columbia Circuit stayed U.S. District Judge Ana Reyes' March 2025 preliminary injunction in Talbot v. United States, and held that the February 2025 policy memo by Secretary Pete Hegseth on the military transgender ban was likely constitutional under the U.S. Supreme Court's recent decision in United States v. Skrmetti.

On January 8, 2026, Colonel Bree Fram, Lieutenant Colonel Erin Krizek, Commander Blake Dremann, Sergeant First Class Cathrine Schmid, and Chief Petty Officer Jaida McGuire were honored by the Human Rights Campaign after being forced to retire from the military due to the ban.

On June 1, 2026, the US court of appeals for D.C. ruled that transgender members of the military can continue to serve, but the armed services can continue refusing to enlist new transgender members.

On November 17, 2026, in Talbott v. United States, Judges Wilkins, Walker and Rogers ruled that the plaintiffs could continue to serve in the military while their lawsuit was ongoing.

== Timeline ==
Timeline of the status of transgender members of the U.S. military
Policies	Access to publicly funded gender-affirming surgeries	Accession policy	DEERS gender marker changes	Discharges issued	Exceptions	Gender identity discrimination protections	Retention policy	Waiver criteria
c. early 1960s – June 30, 2016	Banned (specifically banned "gender change" procedures from coverage under TRICARE from April 19, 1976 – June 30, 2016)	Disqualified	No changes allowed; must match sex assigned at birth	Other Than Honorable – Very common; General (Under Honorable Conditions) – Common; Entry-Level Separation and Medical – Uncommon; Dishonorable, Honorable, and Medical Retirement – Extremely rare	None	Not protected under Military Equal Opportunity (MEO) policy	Disqualified	None
June 30, 2016 – January 1, 2018	Allowed	Disqualified	Allowed	None	None	Protected under MEO policy (July 1, 2016 – present)	Allowed	None
January 1, 2018 – April 12, 2019; January 25, 2021 – February 7, 2025; and March 27, 2025 – May 8, 2025	Allowed	Allowed	Allowed	None	None	Protected under MEO policy (July 1, 2016 – present)	Allowed	A minimum of 18 months has passed since the completion of all medical treatment associated with the gender transition, including any surgeries (January 1, 2018 – April 12, 2019); The applicant is clinically stable, as confirmed by a licensed medical provider, with no significant functional limitations or clinically significant distress related to gender transition (January 1, 2018 – April 12, 2019); The applicant is medically and psychologically stable following gender transition–related treatment, as confirmed by a licensed medical provider, with no significant functional limitations or clinically significant distress; stability is determined on a case-by-case basis without a fixed minimum time requirement (January 25, 2021 – February 7, 2025; and March 27, 2025 – May 8, 2025); The applicant meets all applicable medical and physical standards in their preferred gender, including deployability, fitness testing, and occupational specialty requirements; No ongoing medical treatment is required that would prevent worldwide deployability; All legal documentation is consistent with the preferred gender (for reapplicants with a Reenlistment Eligibility (RE) code of RE-4 for Gender Identity Disorder, history of change of sex, history of cross-sex hormone therapy, history of genital reconstruction, history of sex reassignment, history of sex reassignment surgery, or Transsexualism, who are applying for the Prior Service Reenlistment Eligibility Code Waiver (for reapplicants with a Reenlistment Eligibility (RE) code of RE-4 for Gender Identity Disorder, history of change of sex, history of cross-sex hormone therapy, history of genital reconstruction, history of sex reassignment, history of sex reassignment surgery, or Transsexualism, who are applying for the Prior Service Reenlistment Eligibility Code Waiver)
April 12, 2019 – January 25, 2021	Banned, excluding: Consultation with a military medical provider; Have continuity of health care facilitated if separating; Receiving a diagnosis of gender dysphoria; Receiving "necessary care" under Title 10, Section 1074 and the July 29, 2016 Health Affairs guidance, but only as long as they remained in service and as set forth in a medical treatment plan; Receiving mental health counseling; Service members diagnosed by a military medical provider with gender dysphoria by April 12, 2019; Service members who received a waiver from April 12, 2019 onwards; Treatment for other medical conditions, including complications from earlier treatment	Disqualified, excluding applicants granted waivers	Allowed if exempt or waived; otherwise required to match biological sex	Honorable discharges	Service members diagnosed by April 12, 2019	Protected under MEO policy (July 1, 2016 – present)	Allowed	Non-exempt service member who is disqualified if they have any medical condition or history of treatment for gender transition that requires or has required medical care or specialist consultations associated with gender transition, or if they have a history of cross-sex hormone therapy, sex reassignment or genital reconstruction surgery, or a diagnosis of gender dysphoria
February 7, 2025 – March 27, 2025	Paused from February 7, 2025 to February 26, 2025; banned retroactively from February 26, 2025 to March 27, 2025 and again from May 9, 2025 onward, except medically necessary care for surgical complications or repairs	Paused from February 7, 2025 to February 26, 2025; disqualified from February 26, 2025 to March 27, 2025, and again from May 8, 2025 onward	Allowed (February 7, 2025 – February 26, 2025), then banned retroactively (February 26, 2025 – March 27, 2025)	None	Allowed	Protected under MEO policy (July 1, 2016 – present)	Compelling government interest in retaining the member due to direct support of warfighting capabilities; No history of attempting to transition to any sex other than biological sex; 36 consecutive months of stability in biological sex without clinically significant distress or impairment; Willing and able to adhere to all standards associated with biological sex (February 26, 2025 – March 27, 2025; May 8, 2025 – present)	
May 8, 2025 – June 6, 2025	Paused from February 7, 2025 to February 26, 2025; banned retroactively from February 26, 2025 to March 27, 2025 and again from May 9, 2025 onward, except medically necessary care for surgical complications or repairs	Paused from February 7, 2025 to February 26, 2025; disqualified from February 26, 2025 to March 27, 2025, and again from May 8, 2025 onward		Honorable discharges issued to service members who undergo voluntary separation processing from February 26, 2025 to March 28, 2025 and May 8, 2025 to June 6, 2025 for Active Component members and May 8, 2025 to July 7, 2025 for Reserve Component members	Not protected under MEO policy; transgender service members to be treated with "dignity and respect" according to a Senior Defense Official	Protected under MEO policy (July 1, 2016 – present)	Compelling government interest in retaining the member due to direct support of warfighting capabilities; No history of attempting to transition to any sex other than biological sex; 36 consecutive months of stability in biological sex without clinically significant distress or impairment; Willing and able to adhere to all standards associated with biological sex (February 26, 2025 – March 27, 2025; May 8, 2025 – present)	Allowed, but those who had initiated voluntary separation proceedings began the discharge process
June 6, 2025 – July 7, 2025	Paused from February 7, 2025 to February 26, 2025; banned retroactively from February 26, 2025 to March 27, 2025 and again from May 9, 2025 onward, except medically necessary care for surgical complications or repairs	Paused from February 7, 2025 to February 26, 2025; disqualified from February 26, 2025 to March 27, 2025, and again from May 8, 2025 onward		Honorable discharges will be issued to service members who undergo voluntary separation processing from February 26, 2025, to March 28, 2025, and from May 8, 2025, to June 6, 2025, for Active Component members, and from May 8, 2025, to July 7, 2025, for Reserve Component members, with Active Component members involuntarily separated on or after June 6, 2025, receiving Honorable discharges	Not protected under MEO policy; transgender service members to be treated with "dignity and respect" according to a Senior Defense Official	Protected under MEO policy (July 1, 2016 – present)	Compelling government interest in retaining the member due to direct support of warfighting capabilities; No history of attempting to transition to any sex other than biological sex; 36 consecutive months of stability in biological sex without clinically significant distress or impairment; Willing and able to adhere to all standards associated with biological sex (February 26, 2025 – March 27, 2025; May 8, 2025 – present)	Active component disqualified retroactively unless granted a waiver; reserve component allowed, but reserve members who had initiated voluntary separation proceedings were undergoing the discharge process
July 7, 2025 – present	Paused from February 7, 2025 to February 26, 2025; banned retroactively from February 26, 2025 to March 27, 2025 and again from May 9, 2025 onward, except medically necessary care for surgical complications or repairs	Paused from February 7, 2025 to February 26, 2025; disqualified from February 26, 2025 to March 27, 2025, and again from May 8, 2025 onward		Honorable discharges will be issued to service members who undergo voluntary separation processing from February 26, 2025, to March 28, 2025, and from May 8, 2025, to June 6, 2025, for Active Component members, and from May 8, 2025, to July 7, 2025, for Reserve Component members, with Active Component members involuntarily separated on or after June 6, 2025, receiving Honorable discharges, with Reserve Component members involuntarily separated on or after July 7, 2025, receiving Honorable discharges	Not protected under MEO policy; transgender service members to be treated with "dignity and respect" according to a Senior Defense Official	Protected under MEO policy (July 1, 2016 – present)	Compelling government interest in retaining the member due to direct support of warfighting capabilities; No history of attempting to transition to any sex other than biological sex; 36 consecutive months of stability in biological sex without clinically significant distress or impairment; Willing and able to adhere to all standards associated with biological sex (February 26, 2025 – March 27, 2025; May 8, 2025 – present)	Disqualified retroactively unless granted a waiver

== Demographics ==
Research has found that transgender people are significantly more likely to serve in the United States military than the general population. In 2014, the Williams Institute at the UCLA School of Law estimated that approximately 15,500 transgender individuals were serving on active duty or in the National Guard or Reserve, based on data from the National Transgender Discrimination Survey combined with U.S. military service rates. According to the same 2014 study, despite the ban on open military service at the time, about 21.4% of the total transgender population in the U.S. was estimated to have served in the military. About 32% of transgender individuals in the U.S. who are assigned male at birth serve or have served in the military, compared to 5.5% for transgender individuals assigned female at birth. The report noted, "[t]he American military employs more transgender people than any other organisation in the world: around 15,500 ... more than 6,000 of whom are on active duty."

In 2016, the Williams Institute updated its estimate to approximately 12,800 transgender service members using revised survey and demographic data. That same year, a RAND Corporation study commissioned by the Department of Defense estimated between 1,320 and 6,630 transgender personnel on active duty, and between 830 and 4,160 in the Selected Reserve. The 2016 Workplace and Gender Relations Survey of Active Duty Members found that approximately 9,000 service members self-identified as transgender. In 2018, the Department of Defense reported that 8,980 service members self-identified as transgender in personnel records, and 1,071 had been diagnosed with gender dysphoria in the preceding year.

In 2019, the Department of Defense stated that approximately 1,400 service members had been diagnosed with gender dysphoria, and fewer than 10 were receiving gender reassignment surgery. In 2020, a study published in the journal Transgender Health estimated that approximately 8,000 transgender individuals were serving on active duty in the U.S. military, based on a descriptive analysis of service member records. In December 2024, Pentagon officials stated that 4,240 active-duty, National Guard, and Reserve troops had been diagnosed with gender dysphoria, a figure used by the department as a proxy for the number of transgender service members. On May 15, 2025, a senior Department of Defense official confirmed in a background briefing that the estimate of roughly 4,200 service members was based on the December 2024 count and that no updated figure had been produced.

== Administrative separation ==
Key U.S. Army, Navy/USMC, Air Force, Coast Guard, and DoD regulations used to exclude transgender people
Date (first known)	Service/Scope	Regulation (official title)	Operative wording / category used at the time	Discharge characterization (if known)
1917 (World War I mobilization)	U.S. Army	War Department medical circulars to induction boards	"Constitutional psychopathic inferiority"	Not applicable (pre-enlistment exclusion)
June 7, 1917	U.S. Army	Manual for the Medical Department, United States Army	"Constitutional psychopathic inferiority"	Not applicable (pre-enlistment exclusion)
Dec 1, 1942 (wartime updates)	U.S. Navy/USMC	Manual of the Medical Department, United States Navy	* "Constitutional psychopathic state" * "Sexual deviation"	Undesirable; occasionally Medical; Dishonorable possible if coupled with court-martialed offenses
Dec 1, 1942 (wartime updates)	U.S. Coast Guard	Manual of the Medical Department, United States Navy	* "Constitutional psychopathic state" * "Sexual deviation"	Undesirable; occasionally Medical; Dishonorable possible if coupled with court-martialed offenses
June 1, 1944	U.S. Army	Army Regulation 40-105 — Standards of Physical Examination During the Current War	* "Constitutional psychopathic state" * language paralleling Navy/USMC "sexual deviation" categories	General or Undesirable; occasionally Medical
Sept 18, 1947	U.S. Air Force	Army Regulation 40-501 — Standards of Medical Fitness	* "Constitutional psychopathic state" * "Psychopathic personality"	General or Undesirable; occasionally Medical
May 17, 1963	U.S. Army	Army Regulation 40-501 — Standards of Medical Fitness	"Neuropsychiatric disorders – behavior disorders ... as evidenced by ... transvestism"	General or Undesirable
March 31, 1986	U.S. Armed Forces	Department of Defense Instruction (DoDI) 6130.3 — Medical Standards for Appointment, Enlistment, or Induction in the Armed Forces	"Psychosexual conditions ... are" * "transsexualism" * "transvestitism"	Not applicable (pre-enlistment exclusion)
January 28, 1988	U.S. Army	Army Regulation 40-501 — Standards of Medical Fitness	"Psychosexual conditions ... are" * "transsexualism" * "transvestitism"	Not applicable (pre-enlistment exclusion)
July 2, 2012	U.S. Armed Forces	DoDI 6130.03 — Medical Standards for Appointment, Enlistment, or Induction in the Military Services	"Current or history of psychosexual conditions" * "transsexualism" * "transvestitism"	Not applicable (pre-enlistment exclusion)
Apr 12, 2019	United States Armed Forces	Military Service by Transgender Individuals * Military Service by Transgender Persons and Persons with Gender Dysphoria (April 12, 2019 – September 4, 2020) * In-Service Transition for Transgender Service Members (September 4, 2020 – January 25, 2021)	* "A history or diagnosis of gender dysphoria" * "A history of cross-sex hormone therapy" * "A history of medical treatment associated with gender transition" * "A history of sex reassignment or genital reconstruction surgery" * "A history of transition to another gender" * "Unable or unwilling to adhere to standards associated with biological sex"	Honorable discharge required
May 8, 2025	United States Armed Forces	Prioritizing Military Excellence and Readiness (January 27, 2025 – present) * Additional Guidance on Prioritizing Military Excellence and Readiness (February 26, 2025 – present) * Implementing Policy on Prioritizing Military Excellence and Readiness (May 8, 2025 – present) * Additional Guidance on Treatment of Gender Dysphoria (May 9, 2025 – present) * Prioritizing Military Excellence and Readiness: Implementation Guidance (May 15, 2025 – present)	* "Current diagnosis of gender dysphoria" * "Exhibit symptoms consistent with gender dysphoria" * "History of cross-sex hormone therapy" * "History of genital reconstruction surgery" * "History of sex reassignment" * "Medical, surgical, and mental health constraints on individuals with gender dysphoria" * "Unscheduled, scheduled, or planned medical procedures associated with facilitating sex reassignment surgery"	Honorable discharge required

=== Discharges ===
The discharge of transgender individuals from the United States military has historically been an underreported issue, with official statistics rarely recorded. Prior to policy changes in recent years, transgender individuals were often discharged under medical or administrative grounds, typically categorized as "unsuitability" or "unfitness" for service. In April 2015, the Palm Center reported that at least a dozen transgender individuals had been discharged within a six-month period, between October 2014 to March 2015, despite the lack of official data documenting such cases.

Prior to the lifting of the transgender military ban on June 30, 2016, the U.S. Department of Defense classified transgender identity as a disqualifying medical condition under its medical fitness standards, such as DoDI 6130.03, which listed "psychosexual conditions", including "transsexualism", as grounds for administrative separation. The final publicly known discharge of a service member under this policy occurred in November 2015, when Army Corporal Laila Villanueva was medically retired. Villanueva had served in the Army for over a decade and began her gender transition while still in uniform. Despite receiving support from her chain of command, she was ultimately separated under the medical regulations in place at the time.

Villanueva's discharge occurred during a Pentagon-imposed administrative "pause" on transgender separations. In July 2015, Defense Secretary Ash Carter announced that no service member could be discharged solely for being transgender without approval from the Under Secretary of Defense for Personnel and Readiness. While this effectively suspended most discharges, Villanueva was still medically retired later that year—indicating that the ban remained enforceable through medical classification. Her case was one of the last known separations tied to gender identity before the formal repeal of the ban.

According to "a DOD official", as reported by writer Chris Bray on July 25, 2025, a total of 1,404 service members had voluntarily entered the separation process due to gender dysphoria between May 8 and May 31, 2025. Of those, four had completed their separation from the military, while the remaining 1,400 were still awaiting completion of the process. Using the Pentagon's 2025 estimate of about 4,200 active-duty transgender personnel, this represents approximately 33.43% of the estimated transgender population entering separation during that short window.

These four separations were the first known discharges under a reinstated ban on transgender military service, marking the resumption of such removals after a gap of approximately nine years and six months since the last publicly confirmed case in November 2015. Bray noted that a more complete breakdown by service branch, component, and rank had not yet been released, and that congressional oversight might be required to obtain a comprehensive accounting.

Although only 0.28%—equivalent to 0.10% of an estimated 4,200 active-duty transgender personnel—of those who entered the voluntary separation process had been discharged by May 31, 2025, the remainder are expected to finalize by early 2026, given standard administrative separation timelines. If completed on that schedule, the 1,404 discharges alone would account for 33.43%—more than one-third—of the active-duty transgender force, excluding additional voluntary or involuntary separations initiated after May.

Comparatively, at the height of separations under the Department of Defense's ban on service by homosexual individuals—prior to the pre-1994 Don't Ask, Don't Tell (DADT) policy—fiscal year 1982 (October 1, 1982 to September 30, 1983) saw 1,998 total discharges, equivalent to 1.09% of the estimated 91,500 active-duty LGB personnel at the time. Based on current Pentagon estimates, the projected 2025 transgender discharge rate of 33.43% is approximately 30.67 times higher—also more than six times higher than the best historical estimate for the 1944 peak of homosexual discharges during World War II, when roughly 4,000 were separated, representing about 4–5% of the estimated 75,000–100,000 LGB personnel in service that year.

=== Veterans ===
- Calpernia Addams
- Albert Cashier
- Mary Elizabeth Clark
- Charlotte Clymer
- Joanne Conte
- Felicia Elizondo
- Fallon Fox
- Sage Fox
- Phyllis Frye
- Deborah Hartin
- Monica Helms
- Christine Jorgensen
- Janae Kroc
- Chelsea Manning
- Shane Ortega
- Jennifer Pritzker
- Renée Richards
- Angelica Ross
- Autumn Sandeen
- Lauren Scott
- Emma Shinn
- Sheri Swokowski

== See also ==
- Transgender people and military service
- Transgender American Veterans Association
- Intersex people in the United States military
- Bibliography of works on the United States military and LGBT+ topics
- Sexual orientation and gender identity in the United States military
- Transphobia in the United States
