= Salvia (disambiguation) =

Salvia can refer to:

- Salvia or sage, the plant genus, especially the species
  - Salvia officinalis, a culinary herb
  - Salvia divinorum, a psychoactive herb
- Salvia (artist), a Welsh artist
- Salvia gens, an ancient Roman family
- Salvia, Virginia, a community in the United States
- Salvia, Liburnia, an ancient Illyrian settlement
- Savoia di Lucania, a municipality originally named Salvia
- HMS Salvia (K97), a Flower-class corvette of the Royal Navy during the Second World War
- HMS Salvia (1916), an Aubrietia-class sloop of the Royal Navy
- USCGC Salvia (WLB-400), a Iris-class buoy tender of the United States Coast Guard

== See also ==
- Sage (disambiguation)
