= Henry Sage =

Henry Sage may refer to:

- Henry M. Sage (1868–1933), New York state senator
- Henry W. Sage (1814–1897), American philanthropist, chairman of the board of trustees of Cornell University

== See also ==
- Henry M. Sage Estate, in Menands, New York
- Sage (name), disambiguation page
