= Saige =

Saige is a feminine given name and surname. Notable people with the name include:

- Gustave Saige (1838–1905), French activist
- Saige Harper (born 2002), American rower
- Saige Ka'aha'aina-Torres (born 2000), American volleyball player
- Saige Martin, American artist

== Other uses ==
- An American Girl: Saige Paints the Sky, 2013 film

== See also ==
- Sage (name)
