= Seven Sages =

Seven Sages may refer to:

- Saptarishi or Seven Sages of ancient India
- Seven Sages of Greece, seven early 6th century BC philosophers, statesmen and law-givers
- Apkallu, the Seven Sages in Ancient Mesopotamian tradition
- Seven Sages of the Bamboo Grove, scholars in ancient China
- Seven Wise Masters or Seven Sages of Rome, a cycle of medieval stories of Indian and Persian origin

== See also ==
- Wise old man
- Sage (disambiguation)
