= Yogi =

Practitioner of Yoga

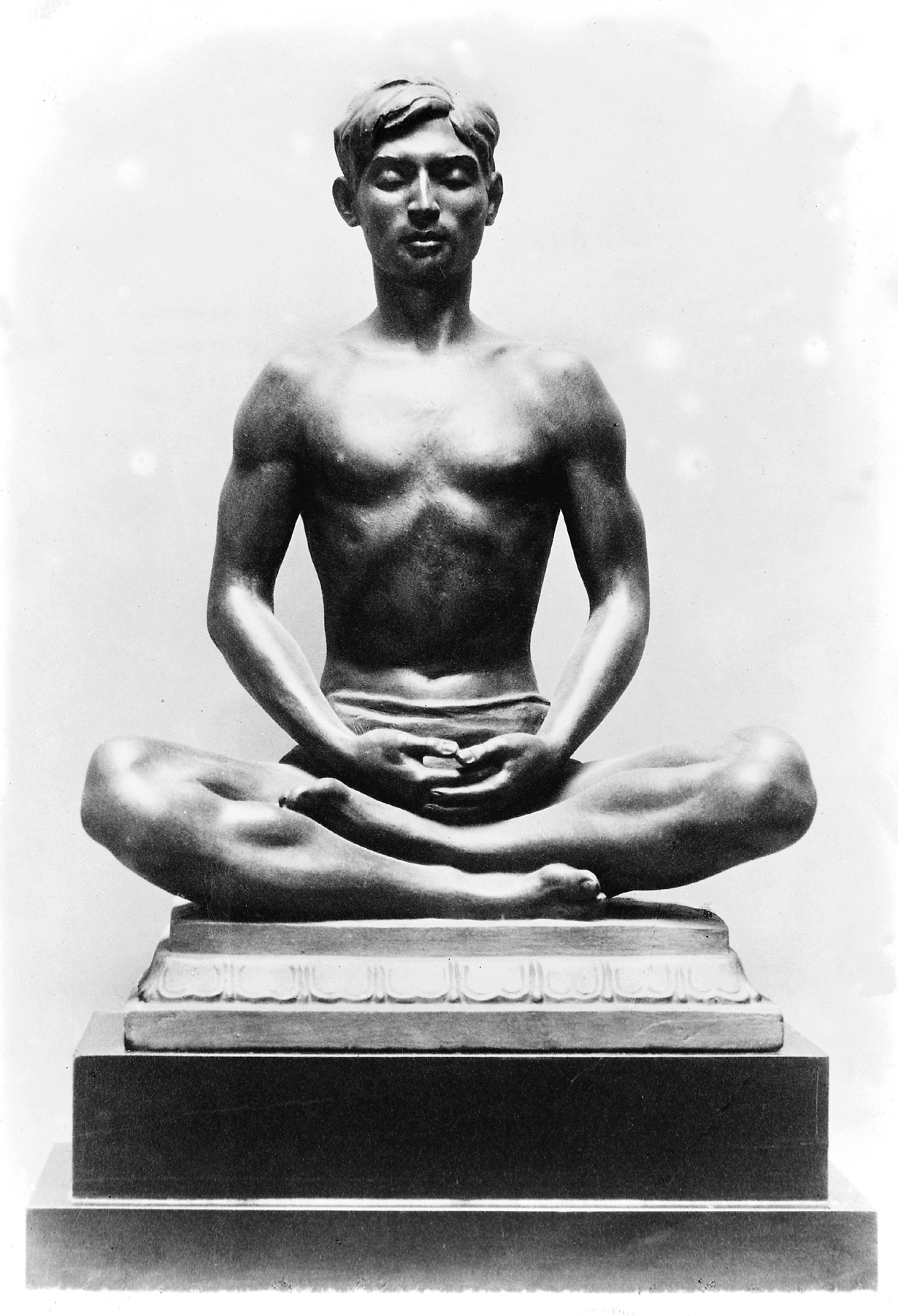
Bronze figure of a yogi in Dhyana (meditation) by Malvina Hoffman

A yogi is a practitioner of Yoga, including a sannyasin or practitioner of meditation in Indian religions. The feminine form, sometimes used in English, is yogini.

Yogi has since the 12th century CE also denoted members of the Nath siddha tradition of Hinduism, and in Hinduism, Buddhism and Jainism, a practitioner of tantra. In Hinduism, the god Shiva and the goddess Parvati are depicted as an emblematic yogi–yogini pair.

== Etymology ==
In Classical Sanskrit, the word yogi (Sanskrit: masc yogī, योगी; fem yoginī) is derived from yogin, which refers to a practitioner of yoga. Yogi is technically male, and yoginī is the term used for female practitioners. The two terms are still used with those meanings today, but the word yogi is also used generically to refer to both male and female practitioners of yoga and related meditative practices belonging to any religion or spiritual method.

The term yogini is also used for divine goddesses and enlightened mothers, all revered as aspects of the mother goddess, Devi.

A yogi should not be confused with someone practicing asceticism and excessive self-mortification.

== Hinduism ==
In Hinduism the term yogi refers to an adherent of yoga.

=== Textual references ===
The earliest evidence of yogis and their spiritual tradition, states Karel Werner, is found in the Keśin hymn 10.136 of the Rigveda, (Note: Sanskrit Original: (Wikisource of the Keśin hymn); Rigveda 10.136, 2nd millennium BCE) though with the terminology of Rudra who evolved into Shiva worshipped as the lord of Yoga in later Hinduism. The Hindu scripture Rigveda uses words of admiration for the Yogis, whom it refers to as Keśin, and describes them as follows (abridged):

Carrying within oneself fire and poison, heaven and earth, ranging from enthusiasm and creativity to depression and agony, from the heights of spiritual bliss to the heaviness of earth-bound labor. This is true of man in general and the [Vedic] Keśin in particular, but the latter has mastered and transformed these contrary forces and is a visible embodiment of accomplished spirituality. He is said to be light and enlightenment itself. The Keśin does not live a normal life of convention. His hair and beard grow longer, he spends long periods of time in absorption, musing and meditating and therefore he is called "sage" (muni). They wear clothes made of yellow rags fluttering in the wind, or perhaps more likely, they go naked, clad only in the yellow dust of the Indian soil. But their personalities are not bound to earth, for they follow the path of the mysterious wind when the gods enter them. He is someone lost in thoughts: he is miles away.

— Karel Werner (1977), "Yoga and the Ṛg Veda: An Interpretation of the Keśin Hymn"

The term yogin appears in Katyayana Shrauta-sutra and chapter 6 of Maitri Upanishad, where the implied context and meaning is "a follower of the Yoga system, a contemplative saint".

The term sometimes refers to a person who belongs to the Natha tradition. They usually belong to Shaiva tradition, but some Natha belong to the Vaishnava tradition. In both cases, states David Lorenzen, they practice yoga and their principal god tends to be Nirguna, that is a god that is without form and semi-monistic, influenced in the medieval era by the Advaita Vedanta school of Hinduism, Madhyamaka school of Buddhism, as well as Tantra and Yogic practices.

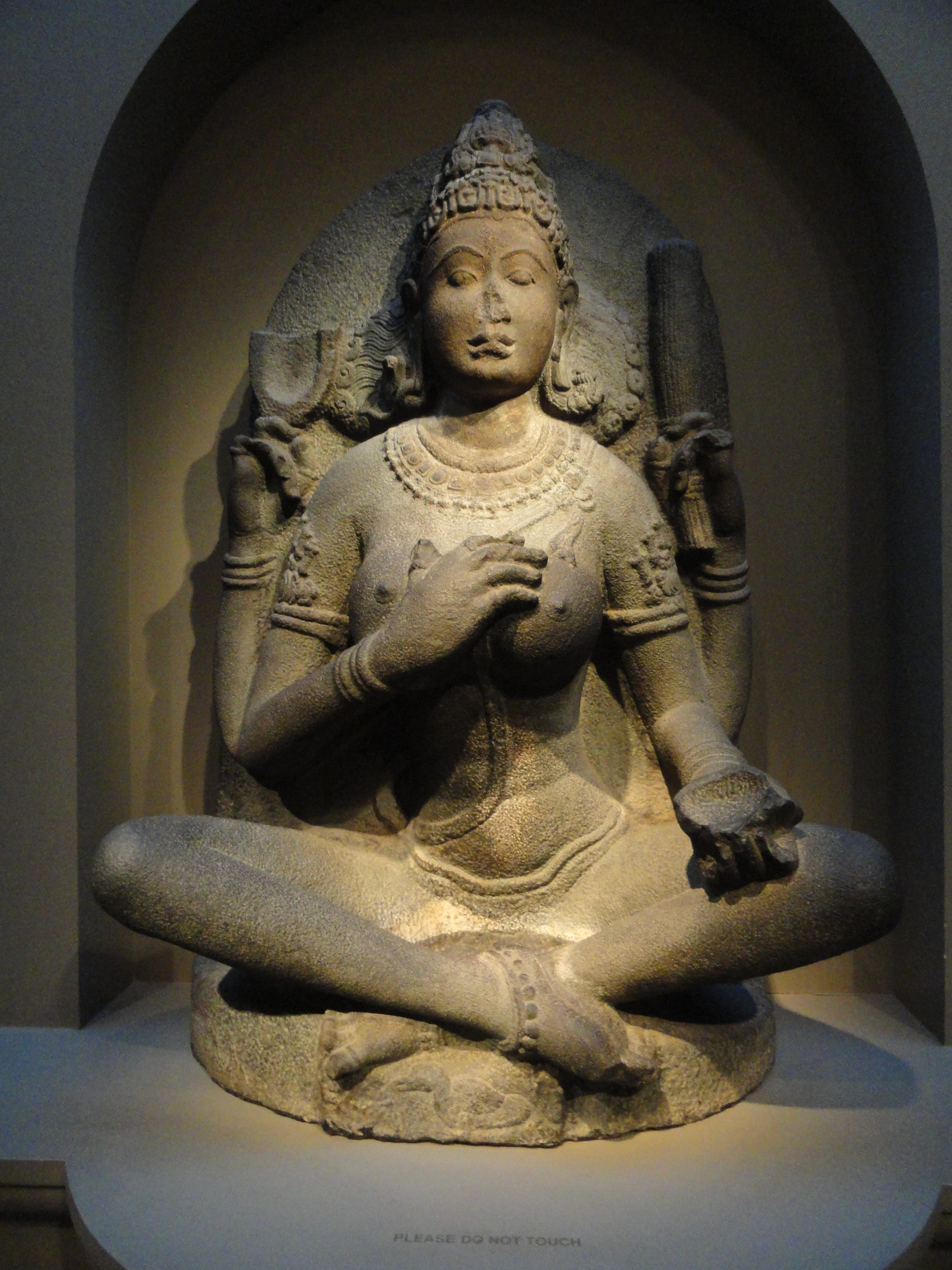
A 10th-century Yogini statue from Tamil Nadu, India. She is seated in an asana, and her eyes are closed in meditative state.

The Yoga-Bhashya (400 CE), the oldest extant commentary on the Yoga-Sutra offers the following fourfold classification of yogis:

1. Prathama-kalpika (neophyte/beginner, devotional)
2. Madhu-bhumika (one who has begun to enjoy the spiritual pursuits without effort)
3. Prajna-jyoti (the advanced practitioner who knows spiritual concepts)
4. Atikranta- bhavaniya (those who have attained what can be taught, achieved siddhas, and are on their personal path to ultimate insights)

=== Sexuality ===
A yogi or yogini aspires to Brahmacharya (Sanskrit: ब्रह्मचर्य), which means celibacy if single, or non-cheating on one's partner.

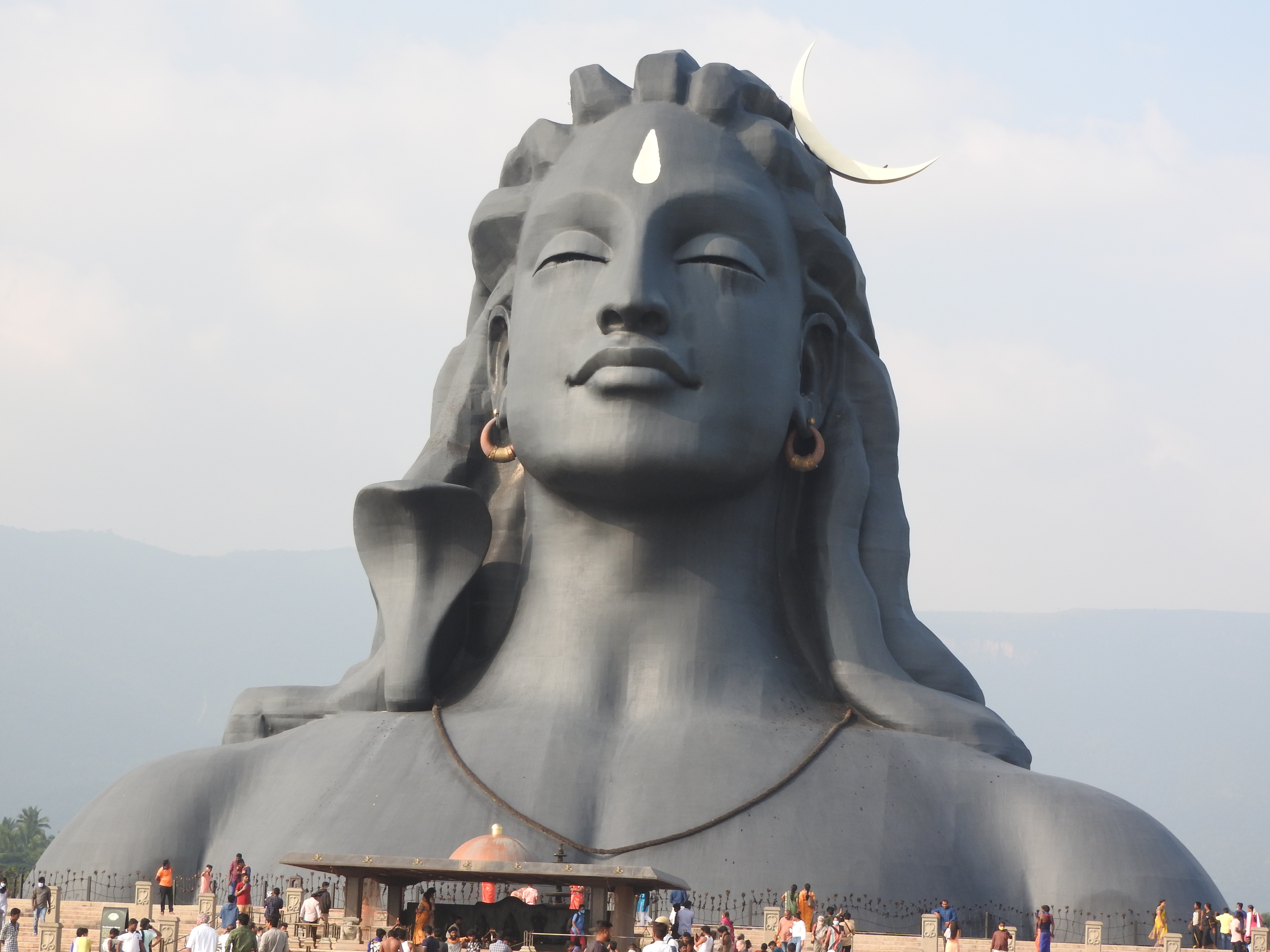
Shiva in the form of Adiyogi (or first yogi) in Coimbatore, India

There have been two parallel views, in Hindu texts, on sexuality for a yogi and yogini. One view asserts restraint in sexual activity, towards monk- and nun-like asexuality, as transmutation away from worldly desires and onto a spiritual path. It is not considered, states Stuart Sovatsky, as a form of moralistic repression but a personal choice that empowers the yoga practitioner to redirect their energies. The second view, found particularly in Tantra traditions according to David Gordon White, asserts that sexuality is an additional means for a yogi or yogini to journey towards and experience the bliss of "one realized god-consciousness for oneself". In the second view, sexuality is a yogic practice, and one broadly revered through the lingam–yoni iconography of Shiva–Parvati, the divine yogi–yogini in Hindu mythology.

=== Ethical duties ===
Both a yogi and a philosopher are seekers of an absolute truth. But they differ in their modes of approach. A philosopher advances in the path of rational logic (theory) and wants to intellectually understand the Truth. A yogi advances in the path of self discipline (practice) and aspires to spiritually realize truth.

— Akshaya Banerjea, Philosophy of Gorakhnath

A yogi or yogini lives by other voluntary ethical precepts called Yamas and Niyamas. These include:

- Ahiṃsā (अहिंसा): nonviolence, non-harming other living beings
- Satya (सत्य): truthfulness, non-falsehood
- Asteya (अस्तेय): not stealing
- Dayā (दया): kindness, compassion
- Ārjava (आर्जव): non-hypocrisy, sincerity
- Kṣamā (क्षमा): forgiveness
- Dhṛti (धृति): fortitude
- Mitāhāra (मितहार): moderation in diet both in terms of quantity and quality
- Śauca (शौच): purity, cleanliness
- Tapas: austerity, persistence and perseverance in one's purpose
- Santoṣa: contentment, acceptance of others and of one's circumstances as they are, optimism for self
- Dāna: generosity, charity, sharing with others

=== Nath siddha ===
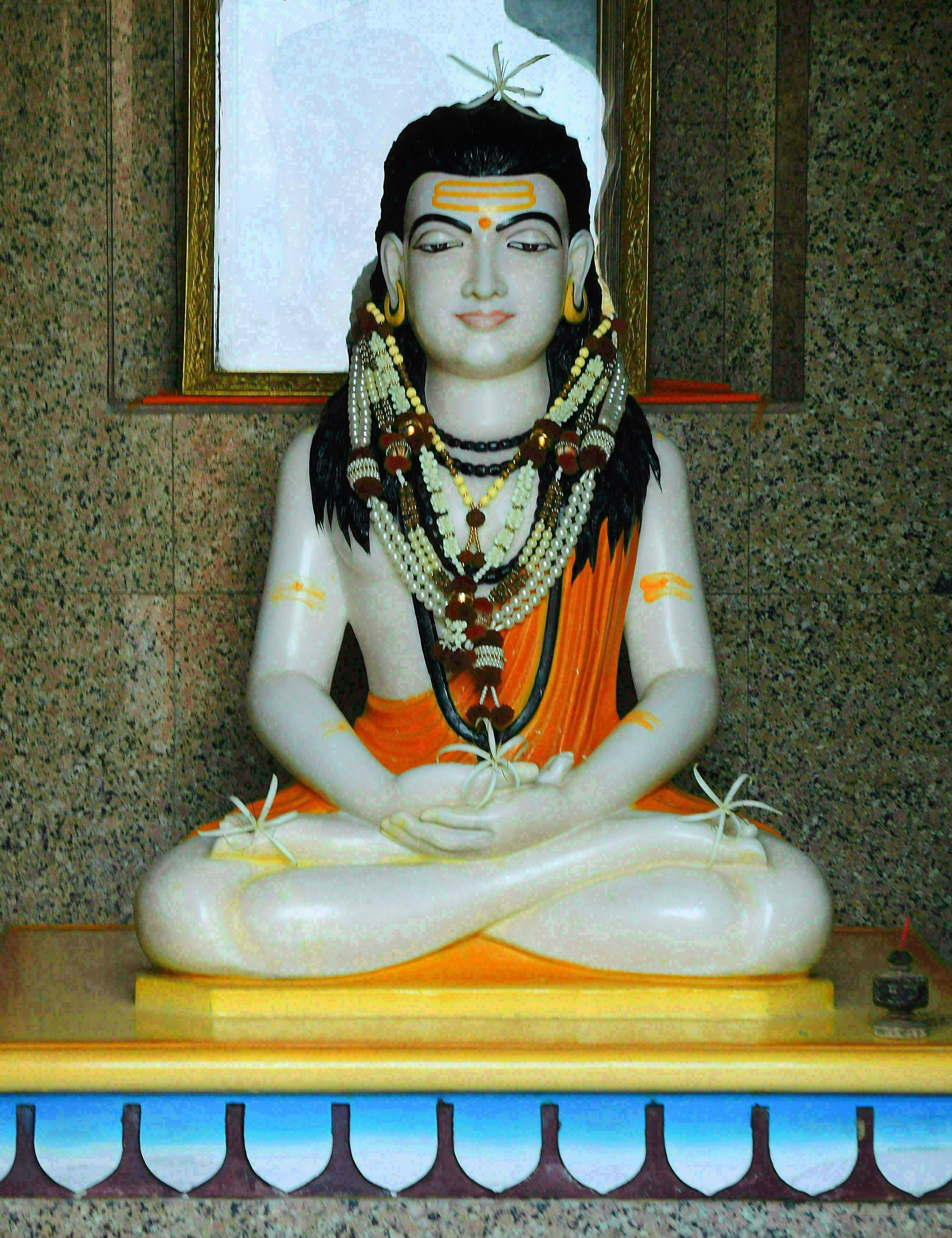
A sculpture of Gorakhnath, a celebrated yogi of Nath tradition and a major proponent of Hatha yoga.

According to David White,

[S]iddha means 'realized, perfected one', (Note: Compare Siddhartha Gautama, one of the names of Buddha.) a term generally applied to a practitioner (sādhaka, sadhu) who has, through his practice (sadhana), realized his dual goal of superhuman powers (siddhis, 'realizations', 'perfections') and bodily immortality (jivanmukti).

==== Respect ====
Archeological evidence suggests that in some contexts and regions, yogis of the Nath Siddha tradition were respected and recognized in India. For example, inscriptions suggest a general of the Yadava king Ramacandra donated a village to a yogi in 13th-century. Near Mangalore, that later became a hub of Nath yogis, a monastery and temple was dedicated to yogis in the 10th century.

David Lorenzen states that the Nath yogis have been very popular with the rural population in South Asia, with medieval era "tales and stories about Nath yogis such as Gorakhnath, Matsyendra, Jalandhar, Gopichand, Bharthari, Kanhapa and Chaurangi" continuing to be remembered in contemporary times, in the Deccan, western and northern states of India and in Nepal.

==== Persecution ====
In some contexts, adds White, the term yogi has also been a pejorative term used in medieval India for a Nath siddha, particularly on the part of India's social, cultural and religious elites. The term siddha has become a broad sectarian appellation, applying to Saiva-devotees in the Deccan (Maheśvara siddhas), alchemists in Tamil Nadu (siddhars or sittars), a group of early Buddhist tantrikas from Bengal (mahasiddhas, siddhacaryas), the alchemists of medieval India (rasa siddha), and a mainly north Indian group known as the Nath siddhas. The Nath siddhas are the only still existing representatives of the medieval Tantric tradition, which had disappeared due to its excesses. While the Nath siddhas enjoyed persistent popular success, they attracted the scorn of the elite classes.

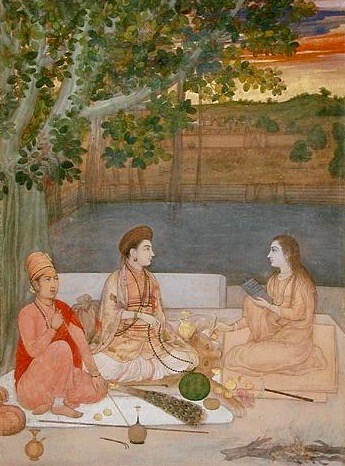
17th century Hindu female Nath yogis. The earliest records mentioning female Nath yogis (or yogini) trace to 11th century.

According to White, the term yogi, has "for at least eight hundred years, been an all-purpose term employed to designate those Saiva specialists whom orthodox Hindus have considered suspect, heterodox, and even heretical in their doctrine and practice". The yoga as practiced by these Yogis, states White, is more closely identified in the eyes of those critics with black magic, sorcery and sexual perversions than with yoga in the conventional sense of the word.

The Nath Yogis were targets of Islamic persecution in the Mughal Empire. The texts of Yogi traditions from this period, state Shail Mayaram, refer to oppressions by Mughal officials such as governor. The Mughal documents confirm the existence of Nath Yogis in each pargana (household neighborhoods), and their persecution wherein Nath Yogis were beheaded by Aurangzeb.

==== Resistance to persecution ====
According to David Lorenzen, the religious groups in Hinduism that militarized and took up arms following the Muslim conquest of India, to resist persecution, appeared among the Nath or Kanphata yogis, often called simply yogis or jogis.

The warrior ascetics were institutionalized as a religious order by Gorakhnath and were expanding in the 13th century, after the establishment of the first Islamic Sultanate in India. They interacted and cooperated with fakirs of Sufi Muslims. The yogis feature prominently in Delhi Sultanate and Mughal Empire period official documents, states David White, both in terms of impressing the ruling elite in the Muslim administration and awards of receiving land grants in some cases such as by Akbar, as well as those yogis who targeted the elite merchants and disrupted the business of administrative Islamic elites in urban areas. In other cases, yogis from the Shaivism, Vaishnavism and Shaktism traditions of Hinduism marshaled armed resistance against the Mughal and British colonial armies.

==== Cultural contributions: founding Hindu temples ====
The history of Nath yogis has been diverse, such as in the 11th and 12th centuries, when Buddhists in South India converted to Nath siddha traditions and helped establish Shiva Hindu temples and monasteries.

== See also ==
- List of yoga schools
- List of Hindu gurus and sants
- Ngagpa
- Rishi
- Sexual abuse by yoga gurus

== Sources ==
- Feuerstein, Georg (2000), The Shambhala Encyclopedia of Yoga, Shambhala Publications
- Rosen, Richard (2012), Original Yoga: Rediscovering Traditional Practices of Hatha Yoga, Shambhala Publications, ISBN 9780834827400
- White, David Gordon (2012), The Alchemical Body: Siddha Traditions in Medieval India, University of Chicago Press, ISBN 9780226149349
