= George Sage =

George Sage may refer to:

- George Sage (footballer) (1872–?), English footballer
- George Read Sage (1828–1898), United States federal judge

== See also ==
- Georges-Louis Le Sage (1724–1803), physicist
- Sage (name), disambiguation page
