= Sage (philosophy) =

Someone who has attained wisdom

A sage (Ancient Greek: σοφός, sophós), in classical philosophy, is someone who has attained wisdom. The term has also been used interchangeably with a 'good person' (Ancient Greek: ἀγαθός, agathós), and a 'virtuous person' (Ancient Greek: σπουδαῖος, spoudaîos). Some of the earliest accounts of the sage begin with Empedocles' Sphairos. Horace describes the Sphairos as "Completely within itself, well-rounded and spherical, so that nothing extraneous can adhere to it, because of its smooth and polished surface." Alternatively, the sage is one who lives "according to an ideal which transcends the everyday."

Several of the schools of Hellenistic philosophy have the sage as a featured figure. Karl Ludwig Michelet wrote that "Greek religion culminated with its true god, the sage"; Pierre Hadot develops this idea, stating that "the moment philosophers achieve a rational conception of God based on the model of the sage, Greece surpasses its mythical representation of its gods." Indeed, the actions of the sage are propounded to be how a god would act in the same situation.

== In Platonism and Aristotelianism ==
What more accurate stand or measure of good things do we have than the Sage?

— Aristotle, Protrepticus

In Plato's Symposium, Socrates says the difference between a sage and a philosopher (Ancient Greek: φιλόσοφος lit. 'lover of wisdom') was that the sage has what the philosopher seeks. While analyzing the concept of love, Socrates concludes love is that which lacks the object it seeks. Therefore, the philosopher does not have the wisdom sought, while the sage, on the other hand, does not love or seek wisdom, for it is already possessed. Socrates then examines the two categories of persons who do not partake in philosophy:

1. Gods and sages, because they are wise;
2. Senseless people, because they think they are wise.

The position of the philosopher is between these two groups. The philosopher is not wise, but possesses the self-awareness of lacking wisdom, and thus pursues it.

Plato is also the first to develop this notion of the sage in various works. Within The Republic, Plato indicates that when a friend of a sage dies, the sage "will not think that for a good man... death is a terrible thing." In the Theaetetus, Plato defines the sage as one who becomes "righteous and holy and wise."

The Platonic sages would raise themselves by the life of their mind, while the Aristotelian sages raised themselves to the realm of the divine Mind.

== In Epicureanism ==
Epicurus believed that one would achieve ataraxia by intense study and examination of Nature. This sage would be like the gods and would "[watch] the infinity of worlds arising out of atoms in the infinite void" and because of this nothing ever disturbs the peace of his soul. Certainly, they would be "unconcerned by mundane affairs in their bright, eternal tranquility, they spend their time contemplating the infinity of space, time, and the multiple worlds."

According to Seneca the Younger, Epicurus believed that the sage rarely gets married, because marriage is accompanied by many inconveniences.

Léon Robin, in his commentary on Lucretius, writes "the sage places himself within the immutability of eternal Nature, which is independent of time."

== In Stoicism ==
It is the view of Zeno and his Stoic followers that there are two races of men, that of the worthwhile, and that of the worthless. The race of the worthwhile employ the virtues through all of their lives, while the race of the worthless employ the vices. Hence the worthwhile always do the right thing on which they embark, while the worthless do wrong.

— Arius Didymus

The concept of the sage within Stoicism was an important topic. Indeed, the discussion of Stoic ethics within Stobaeus, which depended on Arius Didymus, spent over a third of its length discussing the sage. The Stoic sage was understood to be an inaccessible ideal rather than a concrete reality.

The aim of Stoicism was to live a life of virtue, where "virtue consists in a will which is in agreement with Nature." As such, the sage is one who has attained such a state of being and whose life consequently becomes tranquil. The standard was so high that Stoics were unsure whether one had ever existed; if so, possibly only Socrates or Diogenes of Sinope had achieved such a state.

Despite this, the Stoics regarded sages as the only virtuous and happy humans. All others are regarded as fools, morally vicious, slaves and unfortunate. The Stoics did not admit any middle ground, as Cicero articulated the concept: "every non-sage is mad."

The Stoics conceived of the sage as an individual beyond any possibility of harm from fate. The difficulties of life faced by other humans (illness, poverty, criticism, bad reputation, death, etc.) could not cause any sorrow to the sage, while the circumstances of life sought by other people (good health, wealth, praise, fame, long life, etc.) were regarded by the Stoic sage as unnecessary externals. This indifference to externals was achieved by the sage through the correct knowledge of impressions, a core concept in Stoic epistemology. Thus, the sage's happiness, eudaimonia, was based entirely on virtue.

'If thou wouldst know contentment, let thy deeds be few,' said the sage

— Marcus Aurelius

The difficulty of becoming a sage was often discussed in Stoicism. When Panaetius, the seventh and final scholarch of the Stoa, was asked by a young man whether a sage would fall in love, he responded by saying: "As to the wise man, we shall see. What concerns you and me, who are still a great distance from the wise man, is to ensure that we do not fall into a state of affairs which is disturbed, powerless, subservient to another and worthless to oneself."

Epictetus claims that only after the removal of any attachments to things in the external world could a Stoic truly possess friendship. He also outlined that progress towards sagehood would occur when one has learned what is in one's power. This would only come from the correct use of impressions.

Marcus Aurelius defines the sage as one "who has knowledge of the beginning and the end, and of that all-pervading Reason which orders the universe in its determinate cycles to the end of time".

== See also ==
- Sagacity (disambiguation)
- Arhat
- Bodhisattva
- Mahasiddha
- Vidyadhara (Buddhism)
- Muni
- Rishi
- Sadhu
- Saint
- Shaman
- Siddha
- Vidyadhara
- Wali
- Wisdom
- Wise old man
