= Keśin =

Ascetic wanderer with mystical powers described in the Vedic Sanskrit hymns

The Keśin were ascetic wanderers with mystical powers described in the Keśin Hymn (RV 10, 136) of the Rigveda (an ancient Indian sacred collection of Vedic Sanskrit hymns). The Keśin are described as homeless, traveling with the wind, clad only in dust or yellow tatters, and being equally at home in the physical and the spiritual worlds. They are on friendly terms with the natural elements, the gods, enlightened beings, wild beasts, and all people. The Keśin Hymn also relates that the Keśin drink from the same magic cup as Rudra, which is poisonous to mortals.

The Kesin hymn of the Rigveda is the earliest evidence of yogis and their spiritual tradition, states Karel Werner. This concise hymn, depicting a long-haired ascetic, is considered a precursor to extreme ascetic practices and the Rudra-Siva tradition. The Hindu scripture Rigveda uses words of admiration for Kesins.

== Description ==
The Keśin were lone ascetics, living a life of renunciation and wandering mendicants. The Keśin hymn appears as a precursor to extreme ascetic practices and the Rudra-Siva tradition, primarily due to its mention of Rudra and the ascetic drink in the final verse. The munis are depicted as experiencing heightened, altered states of consciousness and possessing the mystical power to soar on the wind, which presents an early evidence for yogic practices.

Yāska (c. 500 BCE) offered several etymological meanings to Keśin, including the sun or the sun God Surya. Sāyana (c. 14th century ACE) supported that view, followed by some early European Sanskrit scholars, including H. H. Wilson and M. Bloomfield. Hermann Oldenberg took the view that the Keśin Hymn described the "orgiastic practices of the old Vedic times" and the "drunken rapture" of the Keśin.

Ralph T. H. Griffith and Heinrich Roth rejected both the Surya and intoxicant-drinking views. Griffith supported Roth's view of the Keśin Hymn:

The hymn shows the conception that by a life of sanctity the Muni can attain to the fellowship of the deities of the air, the Vayu, the Rudras, the Apsarases, and the Gandharvas; and, furnished like them with wonderful powers, can travel along with them on their course.

Werner contrasts Kesin with Rishi, both loners, but the former being the silent wandering types and the latter being teachers, settled-in-a-hut types.

== The Keśin Hymn (RV 10, 136) ==
The description of Keśin is found in hymn 10.136 of the Rigveda.

=== Ralph Griffith translation (1897) ===
He with the long loose locks supports Agni, and moisture, heaven, and earth:
He is all sky to look upon: he with long hair is called this light.

The Munis, girdled with the wind, wear garments soiled of yellow hue.
They, following the wind's swift course go where the Gods have gone before.

Transported with our Munihood we have pressed on into the winds:
You therefore, mortal men. behold our natural bodies and no more.

The Muni, made associate in the holy work of every God,
Looking upon all varied forms flies through the region of the air.

The Steed of Vāta, Vāyu's friend, the Muni, by the Gods impelled,
In both the oceans hath his home, in eastern and in western sea.

Treading the path of sylvan beasts, Gandharvas, and Apsarases,
He with long locks, who knows the wish, is a sweet most delightful friend

Vāyu hath churned for him: for him he poundeth things most hard to bend,
When he with long loose locks hath drunk, with Rudra, water from the cup.

— Ralph T. H. Griffith (1897),

=== Jamison and Brereton translation (2014) ===
1. The long-haired one bears fire, the long-haired one poison, the long-haired one the two world-halves. The long-haired one (bears) the sun for all to see. The long-haired one is called this light here.

2. The wind-girt ascetics wear tawny rags. They follow the swooping of the wind when the gods have entered (them).

3. “Roused up to ecstasy by our asceticism, we have mounted the winds. You mortals see only our bodies.”

4. He flies through the midspace, gazing down on all forms. The ascetic has been established as the comrade of every god for good action.

5. The horse of the wind, the comrade of Vāyu—so sped by (that) god, the ascetic presides over both seas, the eastern and the western.

6. Ranging in the range of the Apsarases and the Gandharvas, of the wild birds, the long-haired one is their sweet, most exhilarating comrade, who knows their will.

7. Vāyu churned it for him; Kunannamā kept crushing it, when the long-haired one drank of the poison with his cup, together with Rudra.
