= Antoine-Nicolas Lesage =

French merchant

Antoine-Nicolas Lesage (14 November 1784 – 23 May 1841) was a French merchant and dealer in luxury furniture, decorative arts, and interior furnishings, and one of the most prominent Parisian luxury merchants of the early nineteenth century. He founded and directed the Union des Arts, an influential establishment specialising in luxury furniture, decorative arts and complete interior ensembles. His business was widely patronised by French and foreign elites and was mentioned in literature of the time, notably by Honoré de Balzac.

== Life and career ==
Lesage was born in Paris, the son of Victor-François Lesage, a bourgeois of Paris, and Marie Lambert. He entered the Parisian luxury trade in the early nineteenth century and established his first independent business in 1812 at 2 boulevard des Italiens.

In 1821, Lesage founded the Union des Arts at 2 rue de la Grange-Batelière, offering furniture, bronzes, clocks, porcelain, upholstery, and decorative furnishings from French and foreign makers. The business was designed to supply complete interior schemes and attracted a clientele drawn from Parisian high society as well as foreign visitors. Contemporary guidebooks described the Union des Arts as one of the “must-see” commercial establishments of early nineteenth-century Paris.

During the mid-1820s, Lesage organised temporary exhibitions in London, establishing a presence on Regent Street in 1825 and 1826. He is credited with introducing the magazine holder as a furnishing accessory to Parisian society.

In 1837, Lesage transferred the business to 11 rue de la Chaussée-d'Antin, occupying the Hôtel Pernon, former residence of Jean-Toussaint Arrighi de Casanova, Duke of Padova. The Hôtel Pernon also housed the concert hall of Niccolò Paganini, who operated his Casino Paganini there during the same period.

In July 1838, Lesage entered into partnership with a long-serving employee, Victor-Hyacinthe Grandvoinnet, forming Lesage et Grandvoinnet, with a starting capital of 200,000 francs.

Lesage died in Paris on 23 May 1841. Furniture and decorative objects bearing his stamp continue to appear at auction.
