= Sage, Bethel, and Pleasant Hill, Texas =

Sage, Bethel, and Pleasant Hill, TX
- unincorporated community
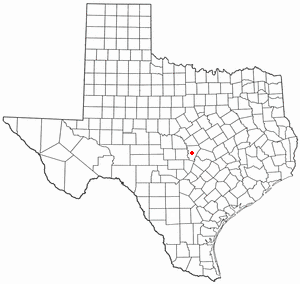
- Location of Sage within Burnet County, Texas.
- Coordinates: 30°52′29″N 98°09′10″W
- Time zone: UTC-6 (CST)
  - Summer (DST): UTC-5 (CDT)
- ZIP code: 78611
- Area code: 512
- FIPS code: 48-11464
- GNIS feature ID: 1353341

Sage, Bethel, and Pleasant Hill were small closely linked unincorporated communities in Burnet County, Texas. They were close to the small town of Lake Victor and seven or eight miles away from Burnet, Texas.

== Sage ==
Sage is located on the north fork of the San Gabriel River where the old Austin-San Saba Road and the old Burnet-Lampasas Road cross. Many believe the name Sage comes from the large amount of sage grass that is located there. The first people came to Sage before the 1860s and consisted of A.N. Murphy, J.A. Murphy, Hugh McCoy, Alfred Shelby. Other families came to the area in later years and consisted of Andy Fields, George Newt Jones (and family), the Harkriders, Pates, Bentons, Hodges, Hahns, Purcells, Everetts, Pipers, and many other families. These families were primarily from Mississippi, Kentucky, and South Carolina. Many people from Sage were veterans of The Civil War and both World Wars.

=== General store ===
In 1890 George Newt Jones built the general store that was on the land owned by the Murphys. Jones was the storekeeper and went to Lampasas twice a month to get supplies. Some supplies included pickles, vinegar, candy, flour, corn meal, sugar, green coffee and every once in a while apples and oranges (every thing came in sacks or barrels). Mark Baily was the last storekeeper when the store closed in 1918. The store joined the Feild land and created a picnic ground and every year they held a barbecue on the Fourth of July that would sometimes last for more than a day there was games, a swimming hole and even candidates would speak. And in the winter they would put up a tent and entertain the residents. The old store building still stands today.

=== Other businesses ===
Hugh M. Murphy built the first Sage gin and then after many years of wear and tear Hugh Murphy's son, Herb, made a new gin in 1900 which operated until 1929. Ira Feild was the last operator of the gin (1924–1929). The only other operators of the gin was Jim Everett and his family.

Sage established a post office on November 17, 1874 which had Jesse G.W. Howard as Post Master but was discontinued from 1884-1898 (during which time the people of sage got their mail from Sunny Lane). The post office then reopened and ultimately closed in 1906 when the mail was redirected to Burnet.

In 1884 Sage had three churches, and a steam corn mill. There was no school or cemetery in Sage so the residents sent their children to school in either nearby Bethel or Pleasant Hill and also buried their dead in the same locations.

=== Stage stop ===
For many years Sage was a stop on the stage route between Burnet and Lampasas. The stage route ran from Lampasas to Burnet Twice a week for many years until travel to and from Lampasas and Burnet became higher in demand. Then the stage ran everyday both ways.

=== Growth and decline ===
In 1884 Sage had 75 residents, and in 1900 Sage had 242 residents at its highest population total. Sage began to decline after the small town was bypassed by the Houston and Central Texas railway in 1903 and by 1940 only a few scattered houses marked the place where sage once stood and by the 1980s there was nothing but the old city limit sign and general store building to mark the once prominent town.

== Bethel ==
Bethel was a small sister town to Sage and used Sage' gin, store, and post office but Bethel had a church, cemetery, community center and school.

Bethel is around eight miles northeast of Burnet on R.R. 963 and on county road 202. The name Bethel comes from the biblical village of Bethel.

The people of Bethel were mostly from Kentucky, South Carolina, and Mississippi, like Sage.

=== School ===
The Bethel school was established in 1869 with John T. Chamberlain as the teacher even though there was no land given to the school until 1874 and on July 11, 1874 A.R. Johnson and T.E. Hammond deeded 3 acres to Thomas Glimp and Jesse G.W. Howard for the Bethel school (Volume I, Page 320, DRBC) and they gave 3 more acres to Thomas Glimp, C.H. Hahn, and Jesse G.W. Howard for the school(Volume I, Page 456, DRBC). The school had one teacher and 25 students in the 1890s and closed in 1941 with John L. Chamberlain and Ruth Fluitt.

=== Growth and decline ===
Just like Sage, Bethel declined after Sage was bypassed by the Houston and Central Texas Railway but it did not decline quite as fast as Sage. Several houses and the cemetery marked Bethel in the 1940s. Scattered houses, a community center, and the cemetery marked Bethel in 1990. And today only a few houses, the cemetery, and historical marker what used to be the town of Bethel.

=== Historical marker ===
The historical marker reads

Bethel Cemetery: The REV. Richard Howard (1817 - 1882) moved to this area of Burnet County in 1885. The frontier settlement he joined would later be known as the Bethel Community. In 1874 he deeded two acres at this site for the community use. The first recorded burial was that of Howard's Grand-daughter, Harriet Ruthie Howard, in 1875. Since then this site has been used as the Bethel Community Cemetery. Buried here are veterans of the Civil War to World War II and many of the area's early settlers and their descendants. The Bethel Cemetery Association was established in 1930.

== Pleasant Hill ==
Pleasant Hill was a small community located about nine miles Northeast of Burnet on Farm to Market 2340 between Bethel and Lake Victor and was closely linked to Sage and Bethel but also Lake Victor. Pleasant Hill had its own school and cemetery. The people in Pleasant Hill were, like Sage and Bethel, mostly from Kentucky, Mississippi, and South Carolina.

=== School ===
The School at Pleasant Hill was a two-room structure built in 1884 and was deeded along with 5 acres on October 14, 1885 to School District #2 by William Hodge and T.J. Stewart. The school was then given to the Lake Victor and Bethel school districts in 1905 because of overcrowding in those communities schools. This school was called 'Pleasant View'.

=== Growth and decline ===
Pleasant Hill also started to decline under the same lines as Sage and Bethel. All that marked Pleasant Hill in the 1990s was the cemetery and scattered houses. Now the old grounds of Pleasant Hill are only marked by the cemetery and a couple houses.

== Bibliography ==
- Bryson, Estelle. "Small Towns and Placenames." Burnet County History. Vol. 1. N.p.: n.p., n.d. 119-30. Print.
- Tyler, Ronnie C. The New Handbook of Texas: In Six Volumes. Austin: Texas State Historical Association, 1996. Print.
