= Lesage =

Lesage, LeSage, or Le Sage may refer to:

- Lesage (surname), including a list of people with the name Lesage, LeSage or Le Sage
  - Alain-René Lesage (1668-1747), author of Gil Blas
  - Georges-Louis Le Sage (1724–1803), scientist
    - Le Sage's theory of gravitation
- Maison Lesage, a French couture embroidery atelier
- Lesage, West Virginia, a place in the U.S.

== See also ==
- Jean-Lesage, a provincial electoral district in Quebec, Canada
- Québec City Jean Lesage International Airport
