= Lesage (surname) =

Lesage, LeSage or Le Sage is a surname. Notable people with the surname include:

- Adam Lesage (fl. April 1683), born Cœuret, alias Dubuisson, French occultist, a leading figure in the Affair of the Poisons
- Alain-René Lesage or Le Sage (1668–1747), French novelist and playwright
- Antoine-Nicolas Lesage (1784–1841), French merchant
- Augustin Lesage (1876–1954), French Art Brut painter
- Ben LeSage (born 1995), Canadian rugby union player
- Bill Le Sage (1927–2001), British musician
- Brigitte Lesage (born 1964), French beach volleyball player
- Celine Lesage (born 1971), French murderer
- Charles Alexander Lesage (1843–1893), physician and politician in Quebec, Canada
- Denis Toussaint Lesage (1758–1796), French politician
- Émile Lesage (1904–1963), Canadian politician from Quebec
- François Lesage (1929–2011), French embroidery designer of Maison Lesage
- Georges-Louis Le Sage (1724–1803), Swiss physicist known for Le Sage's theory of gravitation
- Gilbert Lesage (1910–1989), Quaker charity worker and philanthropist
- Jean Lesage (1912–1980), Premier of Quebec 1960–1966, after whom Jean-Lesage provincial electoral district in Quebec is named
- Jean-François Lesage, Canadian documentary filmmaker
- Jean-Michel Lesage (born 1977), French footballer
- Jodel Lesage (born 1954), Commander-in-Chief of the Armed Forces of Haiti
- John le Sage (1837–1926), British journalist and newspaper editor
- Joseph Arthur Lesage (1881–1950), member of the Senate of Canada
- Joseph Edmond Lesage (1871–1941), physician and politician in Quebec, Canada
- Nathalie Lesage (born 1993), Mauritian beauty pageant titleholder
- Nicolas Lesage (born 1980), Gabon-born Canadian soccer player
- Odile Lesage (born 1969), French heptathlete
- Patrick LeSage, former Chief Justice of the Supreme Court of Ontario
- Philippe Lesage, Canadian film director and screenwriter
- Raymond Lesage (1917–2006), French racewalker
- Robert LeSage (born 1937), Canadian politician in Quebec, Canada
- Xavier Lesage (1885–1968), French horse rider
- Zénon Lesage (1885–1956), Canadian politician in Quebec
