= Sagacity =

Sagacity may refer to:

- Wisdom, or sagacity, the ability to think and act using knowledge, experience, understanding, common sense and insight
- Sagacity (Saga album), a 2014 music album by Saga
- Sagacity Media, an American publishing company
- USS Sagacity, the name of two U.S. Navy ships

== See also ==
- Sage (disambiguation)
