= Sage Fox =

US Army veteran and LGBT advocate

US Army Captain Sage Fox is an American LGBT civil rights figure and veteran. Fox enlisted in the army in 1993, but before that she had been deployed to Haiti and Kuwait when she served with the Special Forces. She worked for the Army Chief of Staff and was a signal officer in 2009. During Active Duty in 2013, she sustained an injury and received medical benefits. When she returned she came out as transgender and she was given an inactive status two weeks later.

Fox is the first openly transgender military service member invited to serve openly. Fox acknowledged that she was transgender when she was 39 on a military deployment in the Middle East. In November 2013, she came out as transgender to her unit. After coming out, Fox was placed on the Individual Ready Reserve. She could not show up for training, collect pay or access benefits but she could be summoned back for duty. In December 2013, she was placed on inactive status and has not done any reserve duty until the repeal of the ban on open military service by transgender individuals.
