= Robert Dorsey Watkins =

American judge (1900–1986)

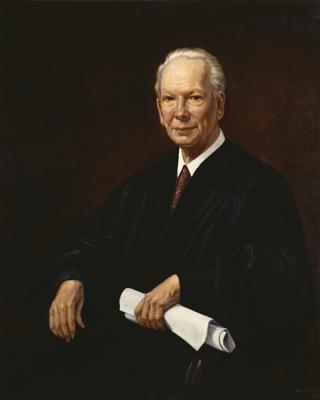

Senior Judge of the United States District Court for the District of Maryland
- In office August 11, 1971 – March 19, 1986

Chief Judge of the United States District Court for the District of Maryland
- In office 1970
- Preceded by: Roszel Cathcart Thomsen
- Succeeded by: Edward Skottowe Northrop

Judge of the United States District Court for the District of Maryland
- In office August 12, 1955 – August 11, 1971
- Appointed by: Dwight D. Eisenhower
- Preceded by: William Caldwell Coleman
- Succeeded by: Joseph H. Young

Personal details
- Born: Robert Dorsey Watkins; September 23, 1900 Baltimore, Maryland, U.S.
- Died: March 19, 1986 (aged 85) Catonsville, Maryland, U.S.
- Education: Johns Hopkins University (A.B., Ph.D.); University of Maryland School of Law (LL.B.)

Robert Dorsey Watkins (September 23, 1900 – March 19, 1986) was a United States district judge of the United States District Court for the District of Maryland.

== Education and career ==
Born in Baltimore, Maryland, Watkins received an Artium Baccalaureus degree from Johns Hopkins University in 1922. He received a Doctor of Philosophy from the same institution in 1925. He received a Bachelor of Laws from the University of Maryland School of Law in 1925. He was a lecturer for Johns Hopkins University from 1923 to 1965. He was a lecturer for the University of Maryland School of Law from 1925 to 1968. He was in private practice of law in Baltimore from 1925 to 1955 and was a named partner in the firm of Piper, Watkins, Avirett & Egerton, which merged with Marbury, Miller & Evans to form Piper & Marbury in 1952.

== Federal judicial service ==
Watkins received a recess appointment from President Dwight D. Eisenhower on August 12, 1955, to a seat on the United States District Court for the District of Maryland vacated by Judge William Caldwell Coleman. He was nominated to the same seat by President Eisenhower on January 12, 1956. He was confirmed by the United States Senate on March 1, 1956, and received his commission the next day. He served as Chief Judge in 1970. He assumed senior status on August 11, 1971. His service was terminated on March 19, 1986, due to his death in Catonsville, Maryland.

== See also ==
- DLA Piper
- Marbury, Miller & Evans
- William L. Marbury, Jr.

== External sources ==
Legal offices
Preceded by William Caldwell Coleman	Judge of the United States District Court for the District of Maryland; 1955–1971	Succeeded by Joseph H. Young
Preceded by Roszel Cathcart Thomsen	Chief Judge of the United States District Court for the District of Maryland; 1970	Succeeded by Edward Skottowe Northrop
