= Judge Quarles =

Judge Quarles may refer to:

- Joseph V. Quarles (1843–1911), judge of the United States District Court for the Eastern District of Wisconsin
- William D. Quarles Jr. (born 1948), judge of the United States District Court for the District of Maryland
