= Judge Nickerson =

Judge Nickerson may refer to:

- Eugene Nickerson (1918–2002), judge of the United States District Court for the Eastern District of New York
- William M. Nickerson (born 1933), judge of the United States District Court for the District of Maryland
