= Herbert Frazier Murray =

American judge

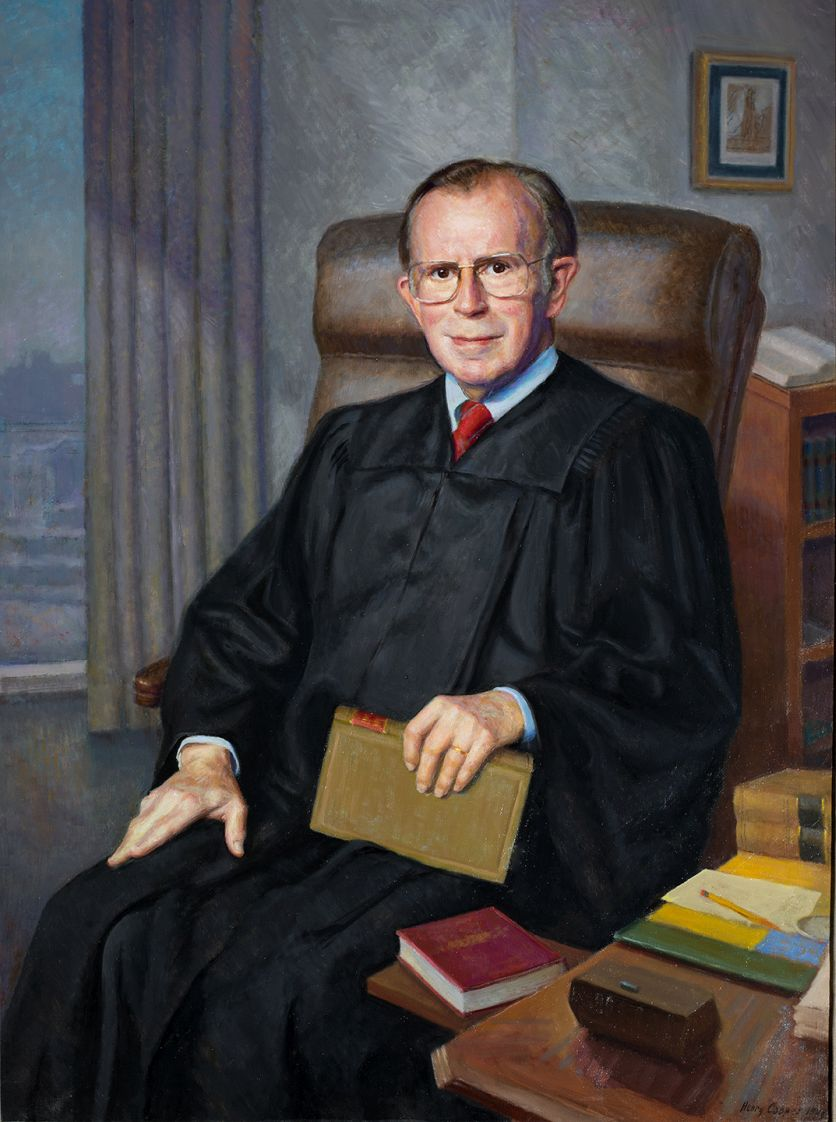

Senior Judge of the United States District Court for the District of Maryland
- In office December 31, 1988 – July 12, 1999

Judge of the United States District Court for the District of Maryland
- In office July 29, 1971 – December 31, 1988
- Appointed by: Richard Nixon
- Preceded by: Roszel Cathcart Thomsen
- Succeeded by: William M. Nickerson

Personal details
- Born: Herbert Frazier Murray; December 29, 1923 Waltham, Massachusetts
- Died: July 12, 1999 (aged 75) Baltimore, Maryland
- Education: Yale College (B.A.); University of Maryland School of Law (LL.B.)

Herbert Frazier Murray (December 29, 1923 – July 12, 1999) was an American attorney and judge who was Assistant United States Attorney of the District of Maryland from 1954 to 1956 and a district judge of the United States District Court for the District of Maryland from 1971 to 1988.

== Education and career ==
Born in Waltham, Massachusetts, Murray was in the United States Army Air Forces from 1943 to 1945. He received a Bachelor of Arts degree from Yale College in 1947 and a Bachelor of Laws from the University of Maryland School of Law in 1951. He was a law clerk Judge William Calvin Chesnut of the United States District Court for the District of Maryland from 1951 to 1952. He was in private practice in Baltimore, Maryland from 1952 to 1954. He was an Assistant United States Attorney of the District of Maryland from 1954 to 1956. He returned to private practice in Baltimore from 1956 to 1971.

== Federal judicial service ==
Murray was nominated by President Richard Nixon on July 19, 1971, to a seat on the United States District Court for the District of Maryland vacated by Judge Roszel Cathcart Thomsen. He was confirmed by the United States Senate on July 29, 1971, and received his commission the same day. He assumed senior status on December 31, 1988. Stefan Passantino served as his law clerk. Murray served in that capacity until his death on July 12, 1999, in Baltimore.

== Sources ==
Legal offices
Preceded by Roszel Cathcart Thomsen	Judge of the United States District Court for the District of Maryland; 1971–1988	Succeeded by William M. Nickerson
