= Joseph H. Young =

American judge (1922–2015)

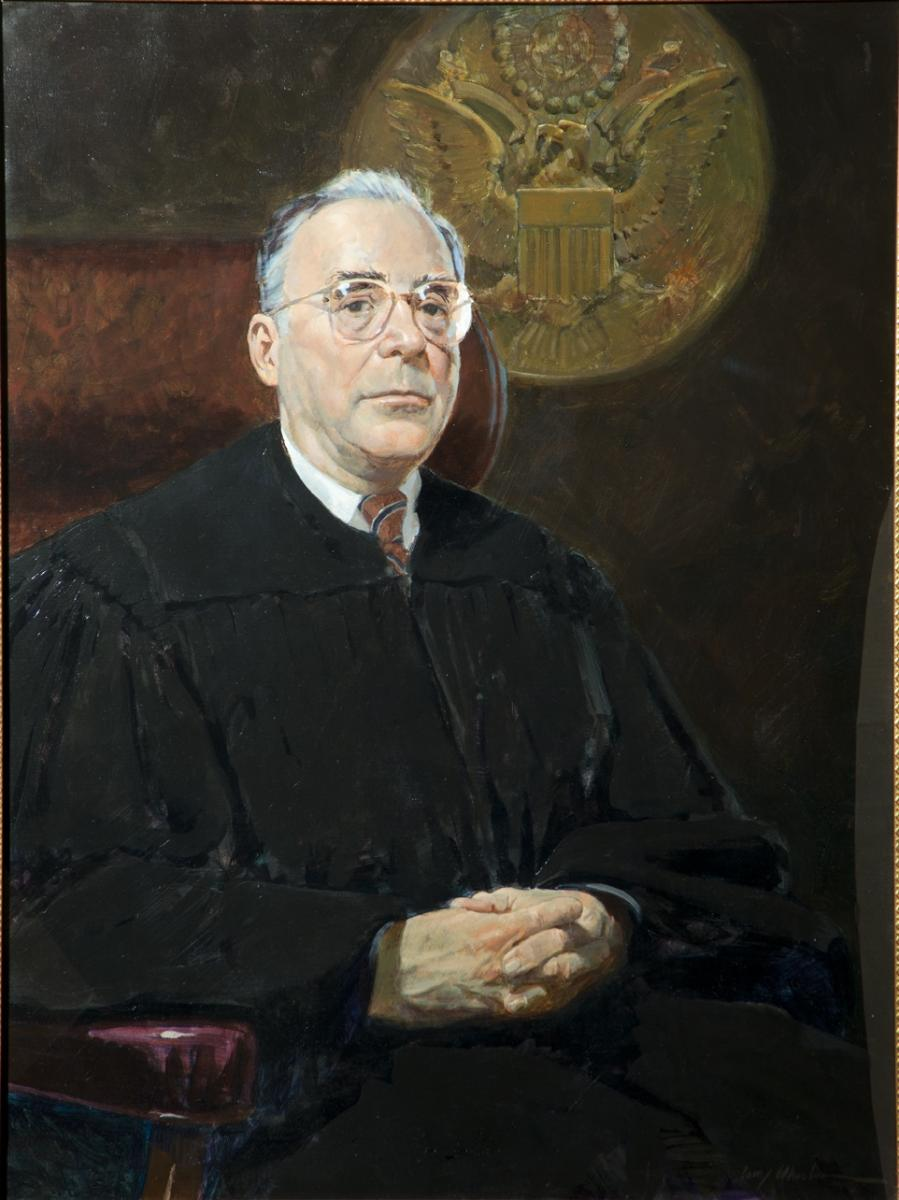

Senior Judge of the United States District Court for the District of Maryland
- In office August 1, 1987 – March 14, 2015

Judge of the United States District Court for the District of Maryland
- In office July 29, 1971 – August 1, 1987
- Appointed by: Richard Nixon
- Preceded by: Robert Dorsey Watkins
- Succeeded by: Marvin J. Garbis

Personal details
- Born: Joseph H. Young; July 18, 1922 Hagerstown, Maryland, U.S.
- Died: March 14, 2015 (aged 92) Baltimore, Maryland, U.S.
- Party: Republican
- Education: Dartmouth College (A.B.); University of Virginia School of Law (LL.B.)

Joseph H. Young (July 18, 1922 – March 14, 2015) was a United States district judge of the United States District Court for the District of Maryland.

== Education and career ==
Born in Hagerstown, Maryland, Young was an infantryman in the United States Army during World War II, from 1942 to 1946. He received an Artium Baccalaureus degree from Dartmouth College in 1948 and a Bachelor of Laws from the University of Virginia School of Law in 1951. He was in private practice in Baltimore, Maryland, from 1951 to 1971, and was an instructor at Johns Hopkins University from 1954 to 1964. (Note: The Federal Judicial Center indicates Young was an instructor at the J.H.U. School of Law, however, J.H.U. has never had a formal law school and its short lived Institute of Law functioned from the late 1920s to the early 1930s.)

== Federal judicial service ==
On July 19, 1971, Young was nominated by President Richard Nixon to a seat on the United States District Court for the District of Maryland vacated by Judge Robert Dorsey Watkins. Young was confirmed by the United States Senate on July 29, 1971, and received his commission the same day. He assumed senior status on August 1, 1987, and assumed inactive senior status on July 31, 2002. Young died on March 14, 2015, in Baltimore of complications from a fall suffered two weeks before his death.

== Sources ==
Legal offices
Preceded by Robert Dorsey Watkins	Judge of the United States District Court for the District of Maryland; 1971–1987	Succeeded by Marvin J. Garbis
