= Roger W. Titus =

American judge (1941–2019)

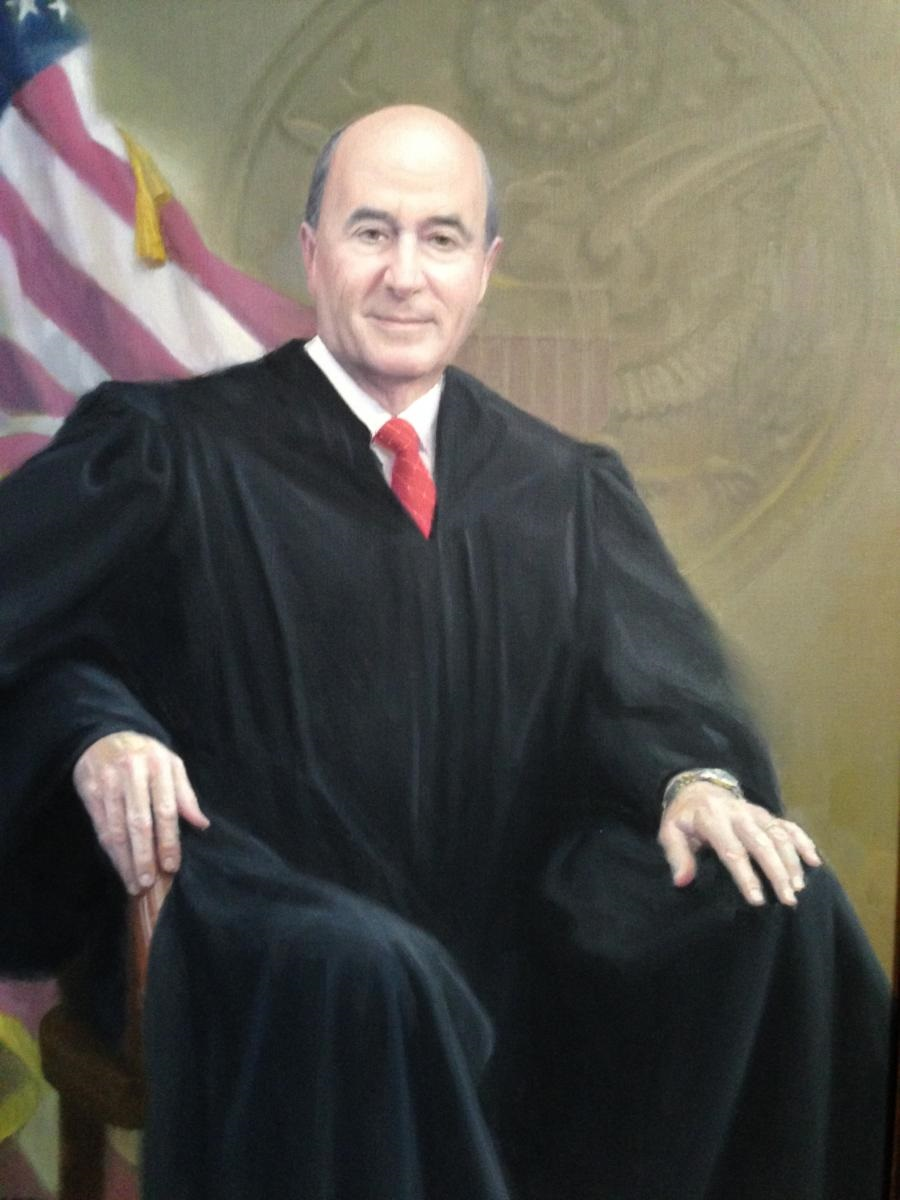

Senior Judge of the United States District Court for the District of Maryland
- In office January 17, 2014 – March 3, 2019

Judge of the United States District Court for the District of Maryland
- In office November 6, 2003 – January 17, 2014
- Appointed by: George W. Bush
- Preceded by: Marvin J. Garbis
- Succeeded by: Theodore D. Chuang

Personal details
- Born: Roger Warren Titus; December 16, 1941 Washington, D.C., U.S.
- Died: March 3, 2019 (aged 77) Washington, D.C., U.S.
- Education: Johns Hopkins University (BA); Georgetown University (JD)

Roger Warren Titus (December 16, 1941 – March 3, 2019) was an American jurist and lawyer who served as a federal judge on the U.S. District Court for the District of Maryland from 2003 until his death in 2019.

== Education and career ==
Born on December 16, 1941, in Washington, D.C., Titus received a Bachelor of Arts degree from Johns Hopkins University in 1963 and a Juris Doctor from Georgetown University Law Center in 1966. He was a Special Legal Assistant, City of Rockville, Maryland in 1966. He was an Assistant City Attorney of City of Rockville, Maryland from 1966 to 1970. He was a City Attorney of City of Rockville, Maryland from 1970-82. He was in private practice in Maryland from 1967 to 2003. He was an adjunct professor, Georgetown University Law Center, from 1972 to 1978.

== Federal judicial service ==
Titus was nominated by President George W. Bush on June 18, 2003, to a seat on the United States District Court for the District of Maryland vacated by Marvin J. Garbis. He was confirmed by the United States Senate on November 5, 2003, and received his commission on November 6, 2003. Titus assumed senior status on January 17, 2014. He died on March 3, 2019, of complications of liposarcoma, at a hospital in Washington, D.C.

== Sources ==
Legal offices
Preceded by Marvin J. Garbis	Judge of the United States District Court for the District of Maryland; 2003–2014	Succeeded by Theodore D. Chuang
