= William Caldwell Coleman =

American judge (1884–1968)

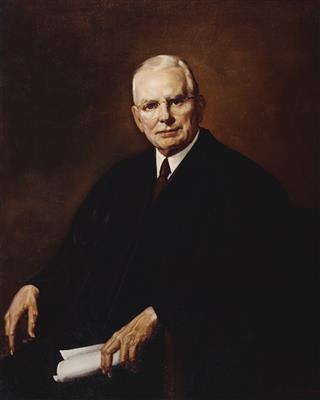

Chief Judge of the United States District Court for the District of Maryland
- In office 1948–1955
- Preceded by: Office established
- Succeeded by: Roszel Cathcart Thomsen

Judge of the United States District Court for the District of Maryland
- In office April 6, 1927 – June 1, 1955
- Appointed by: Calvin Coolidge
- Preceded by: Seat established by 44 Stat. 1346
- Succeeded by: Robert Dorsey Watkins

Personal details
- Born: William Caldwell Coleman; October 17, 1884 Louisville, Kentucky, U.S.
- Died: January 12, 1968 (aged 83) Baltimore, Maryland, U.S.
- Education: Harvard University (AB, LLB)

William Caldwell Coleman (October 17, 1884 – January 12, 1968) was a United States district judge of the United States District Court for the District of Maryland.

== Education and career ==
Born in Louisville, Kentucky, Coleman received an Artium Baccalaureus degree from Harvard University in 1905 and a Bachelor of Laws from Harvard Law School in 1909. He was in private practice in Baltimore, Maryland, from 1909 to 1927. During this time, he was also an instructor at the University of Maryland Law School from 1914 to 1917, Secretary of the Maryland Educational Survey Committee in 1916, and was a Private in the United States Army during World War I in 1918.

== Federal judicial service ==
Coleman received a recess appointment from President Calvin Coolidge on April 6, 1927, to the United States District Court for the District of Maryland, to a new seat authorized by 44 Stat. 1346. He was nominated to the same position by President Coolidge on December 6, 1927. He was confirmed by the United States Senate on December 19, 1927, and received his commission the same day. He served as Chief Judge from 1948 to 1955. His service terminated on June 1, 1955, due to his resignation.

Coleman would serve on the Fourth Circuit panel that decided Bliley v. West, which struck down Virginia's 1912 white primary.

== Death ==
Coleman died on January 12, 1968, in Baltimore.

== Sources ==
Legal offices
Preceded by Seat established by 44 Stat. 1346	Judge of the United States District Court for the District of Maryland; 1927–1955	Succeeded by Robert Dorsey Watkins
Preceded by Office established	Chief Judge of the United States District Court for the District of Maryland; 1948–1955	Succeeded by Roszel Cathcart Thomsen
