= Marvin J. Garbis =

American judge (born 1936)

Marvin Joseph Garbis
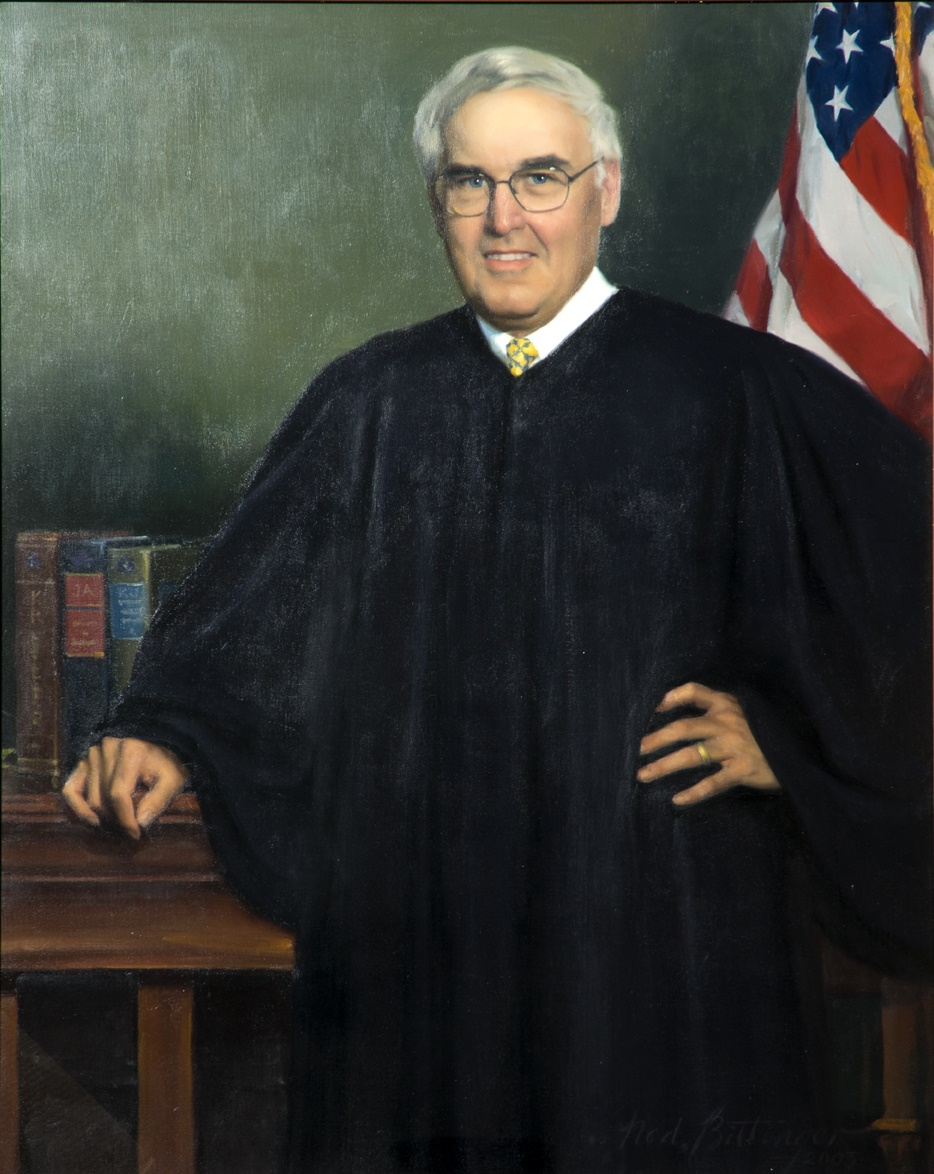

Senior Judge of the United States District Court for the District of Maryland
- In office June 14, 2003 – June 26, 2018

Judge of the United States District Court for the District of Maryland
- In office October 25, 1989 – June 14, 2003
- Appointed by: George H. W. Bush
- Preceded by: Joseph H. Young
- Succeeded by: Roger W. Titus

Personal details
- Born: Marvin Joseph Garbis; June 14, 1936 (age 90) Baltimore, Maryland, U.S.
- Education: Johns Hopkins University (BES); Harvard Law School (JD); Georgetown University Law Center (LLM)

Marvin Joseph Garbis (born June 14, 1936) is a former United States district judge of the United States District Court for the District of Maryland.

== Education and career ==
The grandson of Jewish immigrants, Garbis was born in Baltimore, Maryland, and received a Bachelor of Engineering Science from Johns Hopkins University in 1958, a Juris Doctor from Harvard Law School in 1961, and a Master of Laws from Georgetown University Law Center in 1962. He was a trial attorney in the Tax Division of the United States Department of Justice from 1962 to 1967. He was in private practice in Baltimore from 1967 to 1988, and in Washington, D.C., from 1988 to 1989.

== Federal judicial service ==
On August 4, 1989, Garbis was nominated by President George H. W. Bush to a seat on the United States District Court for the District of Maryland, which was vacated by Judge Joseph H. Young. Garbis was confirmed by the United States Senate on October 24, 1989, and received his commission on October 25, 1989. He assumed senior status on June 14, 2003, and retired from active service on June 26, 2018.

== Sources ==
Legal offices
Preceded by Joseph H. Young	Judge of the United States District Court for the District of Maryland; 1989–2003	Succeeded by Roger W. Titus
