= Roszel Cathcart Thomsen =

American judge

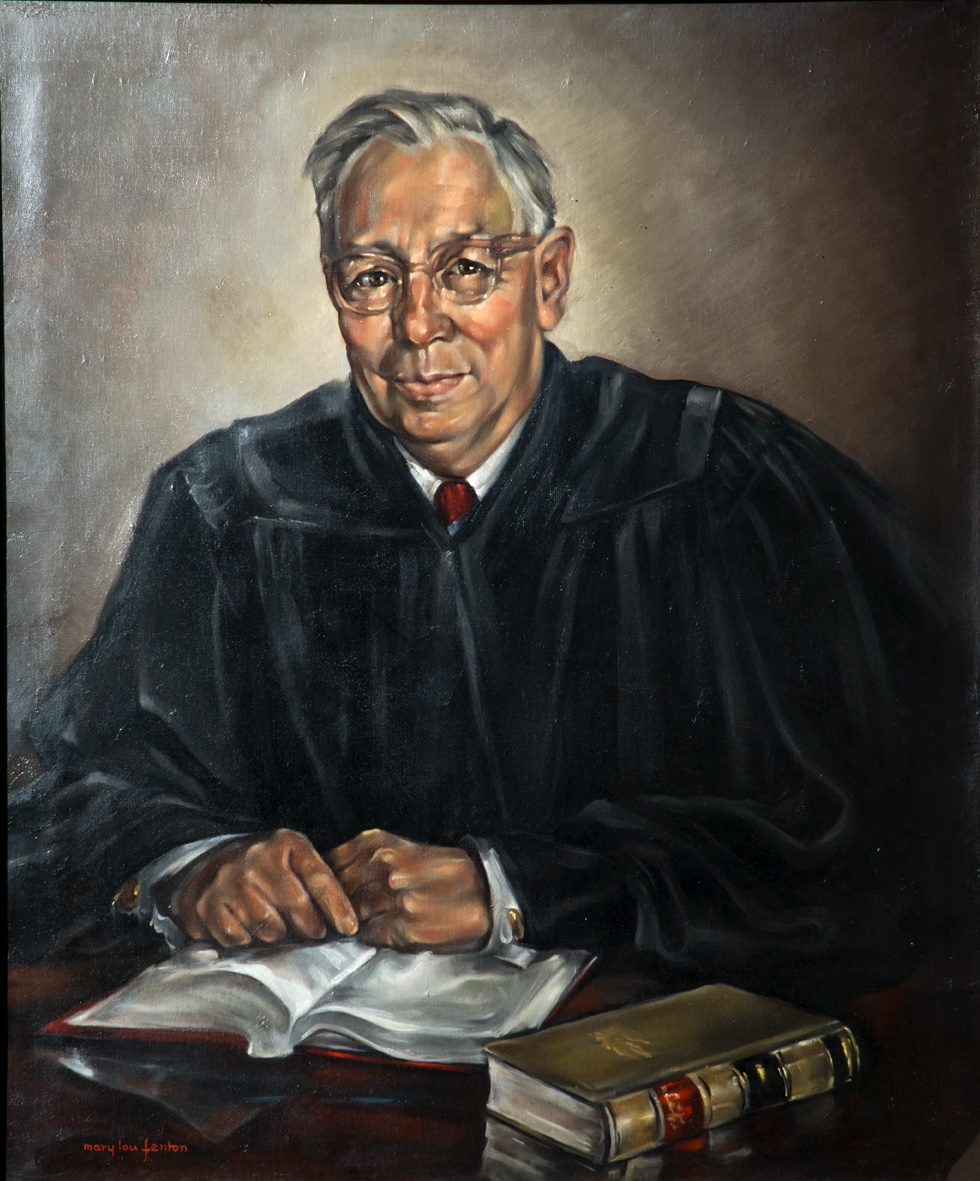

Senior Judge of the United States District Court for the District of Maryland
- In office January 31, 1971 – March 11, 1992

Chief Judge of the United States District Court for the District of Maryland
- In office 1955–1970
- Preceded by: William Caldwell Coleman
- Succeeded by: Robert Dorsey Watkins

Judge of the United States District Court for the District of Maryland
- In office May 12, 1954 – January 31, 1971
- Appointed by: Dwight D. Eisenhower
- Preceded by: William Calvin Chesnut
- Succeeded by: Herbert Frazier Murray

Personal details
- Born: Roszel Cathcart Thomsen; August 17, 1900 Baltimore, Maryland, U.S.
- Died: March 11, 1992 (aged 91)
- Education: Johns Hopkins University (BA); University of Maryland (LLB)

Roszel Cathcart Thomsen (August 17, 1900 – March 11, 1992) was an American attorney and judge who was a district judge of the United States District Court for the District of Maryland from 1955 to 1970.

== Education and career ==
Born in Baltimore, Maryland, Thomsen received a Bachelor of Arts degree from Johns Hopkins University in 1919 and a Bachelor of Laws from the University of Maryland School of Law in 1922. He was in private practice in Baltimore from 1922 to 1954.

== Federal judicial service ==
On March 15, 1954, Thomsen was nominated by President Dwight D. Eisenhower to a seat on the United States District Court for the District of Maryland which had been vacated by Judge William Calvin Chesnut. Thomsen was confirmed by the United States Senate on May 11, 1954, and received his commission on May 12, 1954. He served as Chief Judge from 1955 to 1970, and as a member of the Judicial Conference of the United States from 1958 to 1964.

In 1968 he presided over the trial of the Catonsville Nine who were charged with burning draft records. He assumed senior status on January 31, 1971. He served as a Judge of the Special Railroad Court from 1974 to 1987. Thomsen remained in senior status until his death on March 11, 1992.

== Sources ==
Legal offices
Preceded by William Calvin Chesnut	Judge of the United States District Court for the District of Maryland; 1954–1971	Succeeded by Herbert Frazier Murray
Preceded by William Caldwell Coleman	Chief Judge of the United States District Court for the District of Maryland; 1955–1970	Succeeded by Robert Dorsey Watkins
