= Jonathan Lisle =

British DJ

- Occupation: Disc jockey
- Labels: M Theory
- Website: http://www.jonathanlisle.co.uk/

Jonathan Lisle (September 1974 - 23 December 2025) was a British DJ. After being "discovered" by John Digweed in 2001, he became the primary talent-spotter for Digweed and Bedrock Records. He played regularly at Bedrock in London and has toured throughout Europe, North and South America, Asia and Australia. He was voted one of the World's Top 100 DJs by DJ Magazine readers in 2003. He also used to run his own label, M Theory, which was responsible for releases from artists such as Luke Chable. Lisle originally strongly preferred vinyl to digital media before shifting primarily to CDs. His most well known work is his compilation OS 0.2 on Bedrock Records. Lisle mixed OS 0.2 using only the Denon DN-S5000 CD turntables. During most of OS_0.2 there are three tracks playing at the same time - and sometimes 5. His DJing work, including OS_0.2, is known for its intricate layering and phasing.

Lisle gave up DJing in 2007 to focus on his legal career. He was a corporate partner in the London office of international law firm DLA Piper and became Consultant to the CEO Gerald Metals. He continued to produce music in his spare time and released two EPs on Tokyo label Park Music Limited.

He graduated from Trinity College, Cambridge in 1996 with a First Class degree in law.

Lisle died of heart failure on 23 December 2025 at the age of 51.
