= William L. Marbury Jr. =

American lawyer (1901–1988)

- Born: William Luke Marbury Jr. September 12, 1901; Baltimore, Maryland
- Died: March 5, 1988 (aged 86); Baltimore, Maryland
- Other names: William Marbury Jr., William Marbury, William Luke Marbury
- Education: University of Virginia; Harvard Law School
- Occupation: Lawyer
- Years active: 1925–1988
- Employer: Marbury, Miller & Evans (now DLA Piper
- Known for: Defense of Alger Hiss
- Board member of: Harvard Corporation, Peabody Institute
- Spouse: Natalie Ingraham Jewett (m. 1935)
- Children: 4
- Awards: Medal for Merit, Honorary Law Degree (Harvard University)

William Luke Marbury Jr. (September 12, 1901 – March 5, 1988) was an American lawyer who practiced with his family's law firm of Marbury, Miller & Evans (later Piper & Marbury, Piper Marbury Rudnick & Wolfe, Piper Rudnick, now DLA Piper). He was known to be a childhood friend of alleged Soviet spy Alger Hiss.

== Background ==
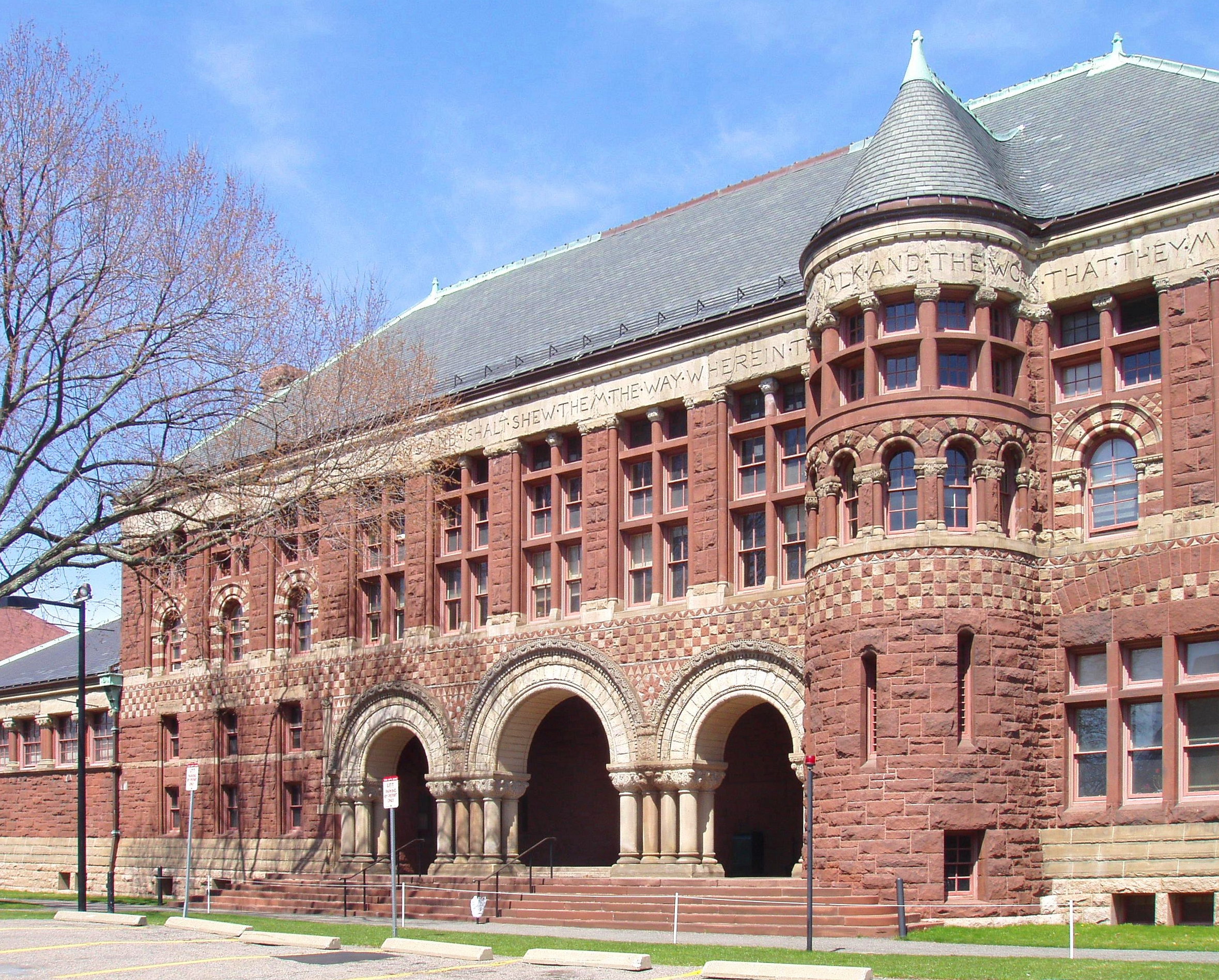
Harvard Law School, where Marbury studied in the early 1920s

William L. Marbury Jr. was born on September 12, 1901, in Baltimore. He grew up in the family home on Bolton Hill, Baltimore.

His father was William Luke Marbury Sr. (1858–1935); his mother Silvine von Dorsner (Slingluff) Marbury (1867–1948). Marbury Sr.'s family were slave-holding plantation owners in Southern Maryland before he came to Baltimore in the 1870s. Marbury Sr. was a eugenicist who helped draft a plan to disenfranchise African-Americans. In 1915, he argued before the U.S. Supreme Court that states had separate rights to discriminate if they chose. Formerly U.S. Attorney General for Maryland (1894–1898), Marbury Sr. became president of the board of managers at Maryland's "Hospital for the 'Negro' Insane" (now Crownsville Hospital Center (1910–1935) and wrote a Segregation Ordinance.

He is a distant relative of William Marbury (1762–1835), 18th century American businessman and one of the "Midnight Judges" appointed by U.S. President John Adams the day before he left office. He was plaintiff in the landmark 1803 Supreme Court case Marbury v. Madison. This ancestor came from Piscataway, Maryland; nearby is Marbury, Maryland.

Marbury Jr. attended the Boy's Latin and Episcopal High Schools and the Virginia Military Institute. In 1921, he graduated from the University of Virginia. In 1924, he graduated from Harvard Law School after serving on the school's law review. While at Harvard, he served as editor of the Harvard Law Review (as later did his friend and protegee, Alger Hiss) and was a member of Phi Beta Kappa. In November 5, 1923, he gave a speech on the "practical side of the professional and the ideals." In 1925, he passed the Maryland Bar.

== Private practice ==
In 1925, Marbury joined his father's firm, then called Marbury Miller & Evans. He worked there until his death in 1988 in a career that spanned more than 60 years.

In 1948, the Board of Overseers of Harvard University elected him as Fellow of the Harvard Corporation. The vote for his election was narrow, as Marbury was "virtually unknown" to Corporation members, except for Harvard University President Conant and fellow Grenville Clark, both of whom supported his election strongly. In 1965, he became a senior fellow. In 1970, he retired from the board.

In 1952, he merged the family firm of Marbury, Miller & Evans with Piper, Watkins, Avirett & Egerton to create Piper & Marbury. In 1999, Piper & Marbury merged with Rudnick & Wolfe of Chicago to form Piper Marbury Rudnick & Wolfe, then "the largest U.S. law firm merger in history." In 2002, Piper Marbury Rudnick & Wolfe, LLP, dropped "Marbury" from its name. (The firm had many prominent 20th-century lawyers, including: Carol T. Bond, R. Dorsey Watkins, Robert B. Watts Sr., and Milton B. Allen, Joseph G. Finnerty Jr.)

In 1957, he became general counsel of the Maryland Port Authority and remained so until 1967.

In 1964, Marbury was among "fifty of the country's most prominent lawyers" who joined a public statement that rebuked U.S. Senator Barry Goldwater for attacks he made on the U.S. Supreme Court.

In 1966, he tried but failed to "censure" key provisions of the Civil Rights Act of 1968.

In 1965, he served one year as president of the Maryland State Bar Association (as his father William L. Marbury Sr. had done in 1910).

He organized the Maryland Legal Aid Bureau. He was also one of the original members of the Lawyers' Committee for Civil Rights Under Law under U.S. President John F. Kennedy, to aid civil rights cases.

== Government service ==
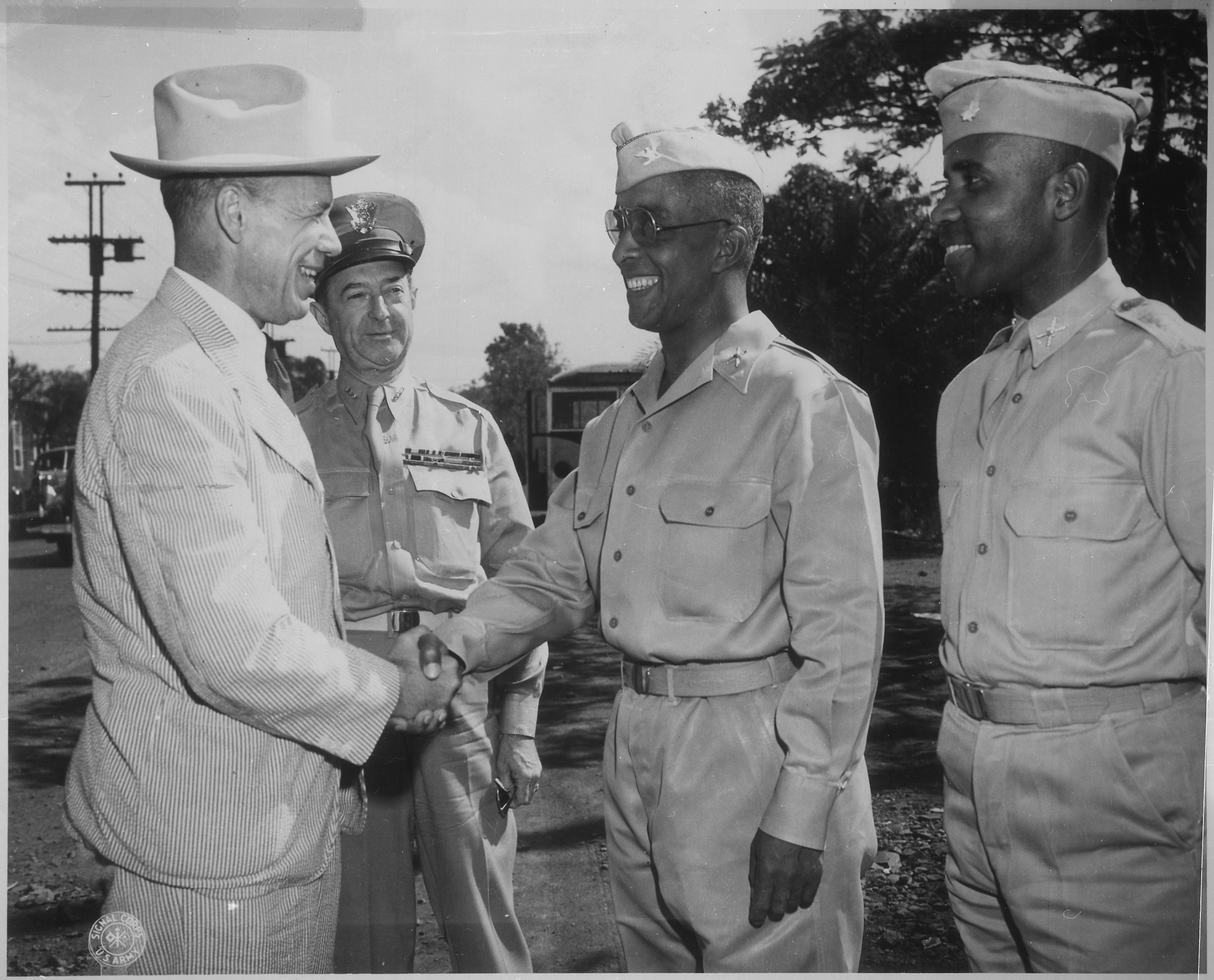
U.S. Secretary of War Robert P. Patterson congratulating Colonel Chauncey M. Hooper in Hawaii under whom Marbury served

In 1930, Marbury served for a year as assistant attorney general for Maryland.

In 1940, Marbury served under Judge Robert P. Patterson for a year as expert consultant on procurement to U.S. Secretary of War Henry L. Stimson. In 1942, he served three years as chief legal advisor on procurements for the U.S. Army Air Corps at the U.S. Department of War).

In June 1945, George L. Harrison brought in two Harvard Law School-trained War Department lawyers, Brigadier General Kenneth Royall and Marbury to draft the May–Johnson Bill, which passed into law as the Atomic Energy Act of 1946.

In September 1945, Marbury left wartime government service to resume private law practice in Baltimore.

In 1948, he served as a U.S. delegate to the second session of signatories of General Agreement on Tariffs and Trade (GATT) in Geneva, Switzerland. On August 8, 1948, he received instructions to attend that meeting and did not return until September 12.

In 1971, he became a member of the Maryland Commission on Judicial Disabilities, where he served until 1983.

== Hiss case ==
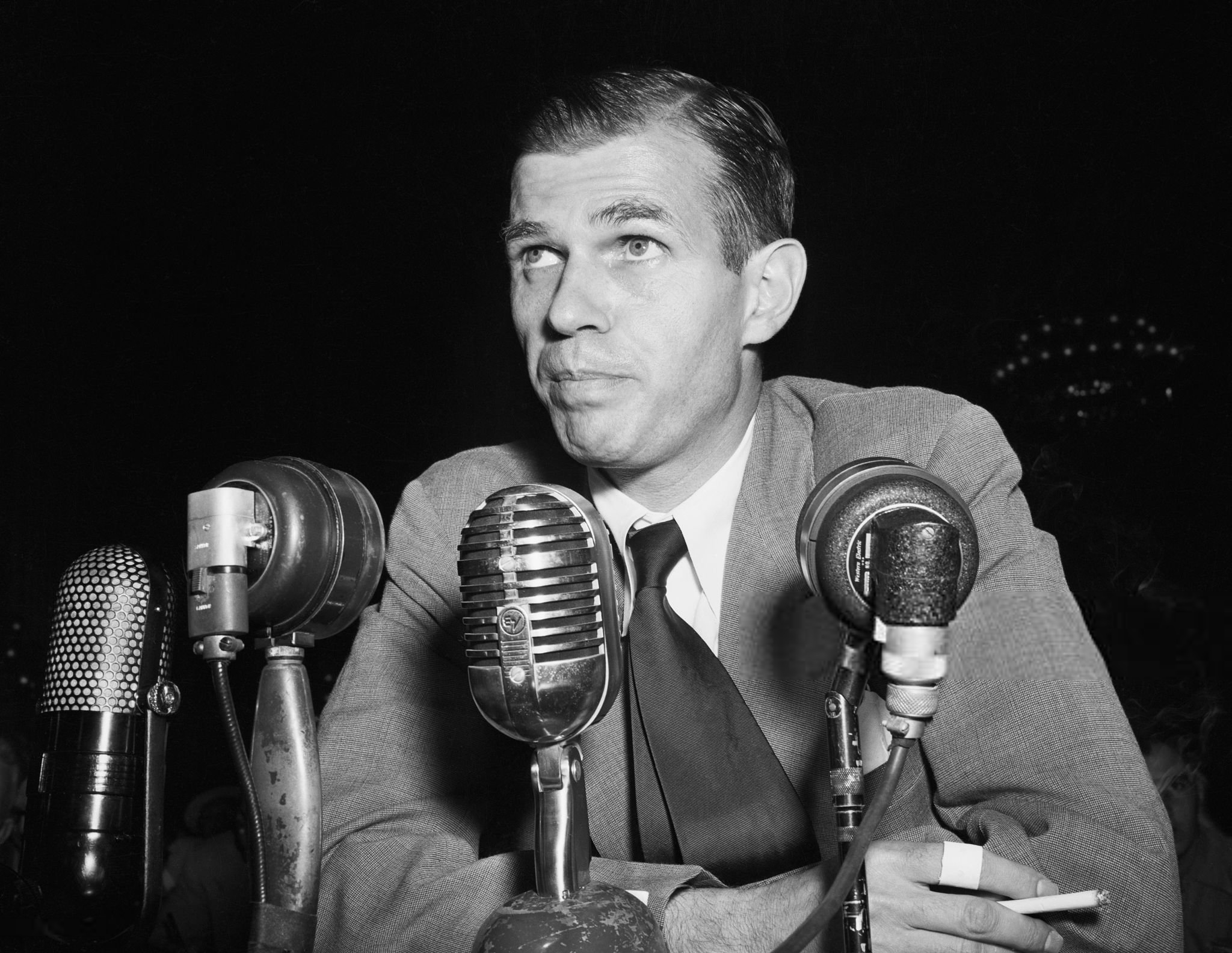
Alger Hiss (1948), Marbury's friend from childhood

The family of Alger Hiss sat one pew in front of the Marbury family at their Episcopal church in Baltimore. One of Marbury's sisters worked at the Johns Hopkins University library while Hiss studied there. His cousin Jesse Slingluff Jr. was a fraternity brother with Hiss in Alpha Delta Phi, as was his wife's brother, Hugh Judge Jewett Jr. (who was in Hiss' class). By 1929, they had become "close personal friends" as adults. Both attended each other's weddings; Hiss was godfather to one of Marbury's children.

Marbury was involved in the Hiss case in its hearings, trials, and aftermath for the rest of his life, with a detailed legal essay coming out in 1981 and a memoir around his death in 1988.

On August 3, 1948, senior Time editor Whittaker Chambers, under subpoena before the House Un-American Activities Committee (HUAC), mentioned Hiss as a member of the Ware Group, a spy ring that Chambers had run in Washington during the 1930s.

On August 5, 1948, Marbury took Hiss to the offices of Covington & Burling, where Hiss's brother Donald worked, for a meeting with Hiss's classmate and Marbury's friend Joe Johnson, helped Hiss to prepare his statement, and then "accompanied" (i.e., not formally as "counsel") Hiss before HUAC. Thereafter, he left the U.S. for three weeks in Europe on government business.

In the "three-ring circus" of HUAC hearings in Washington, libel lawsuit in Baltimore, and Grand Jury investigation in New York during 1948, Marbury led the Hiss defense team in the libel suit against William D. Macmillan Sr. of Semmes, Bowen & Semmes, who defended Chambers.

As Marbury summarized the situation:

It seemed to me inevitable that if he [Hiss] failed to sue Chambers, his reputation would be so irretrievably destroyed that the Endowment would have to dispense with his services anyhow.... I warned both Alger and Priscilla that if there were any skeletons in the closet of either one of them, they would certainly be discovered if suit were filed, and they both assured me there was no cause for worry on that count.... I again warned about skeletons in the closet and mentioned the case of Oscar Wilde, but Alger brushed this aside, saying that he had nothing to hide.

While Marbury was in Europe, Hiss worked with numerous lawyers led by Ed McLean of Debevoise, Plimpton & McLean in New York. While McLean feared that a libel case would come to court too slowly in New York, Marbury argued that Hiss could file in Chambers' home state of Maryland through a Federal Court in Baltimore, if they acted within 60 days. Hiss switched out McLean for Marbury as lead counsel and filed the libel suit on September 27, 1948. During pre-trial proceedings, he recalled, "I made demand on him to produce anything whatsoever which he had in his possession in the way of written evidence which would substantiate his story, and particularly any communications from Alger or Priscilla Hiss." Chambers brought forward the "Baltimore Documents" that included papers handwritten by Hiss and typed on the Hiss family typewriter. Marbury recalled, "I was shocked when I recognized what seemed to be Alger's handwriting.... I was fully aware of the devastating effect that these memoranda would be certain to have on Alger's suit."

Nevertheless, Hiss had Marbury send the papers to the U.S. Department of Justice, clearly expecting it to indict Chambers. Instead, after days of intense grand jury hearings, the Department of Justice indicted Hiss on two counts of perjury on December 15, 1948. The libel suit stalled. When Hiss was convicted of both counts of perjury in January 1950, the libel suit disappeared. (Hiss maintained his innocence until his death, in 1996.)

Years later, Marbury was critical of Hiss. After reviewing his HUAC testimony, he noted:

There was no doubt that in his appearances before the Committee in my absence Alger had handled himself very badly. He had adopted a rather arrogant attitude and had repeatedly fenced with the members of the Committee. He had written a letter to the Chairman which reeked with hurt pride and indignation, and had grudgingly admitted association with Chambers under the name of George Crosley, but only after examining his teeth and asking him to read aloud some passages from a document.

== Personal and death ==
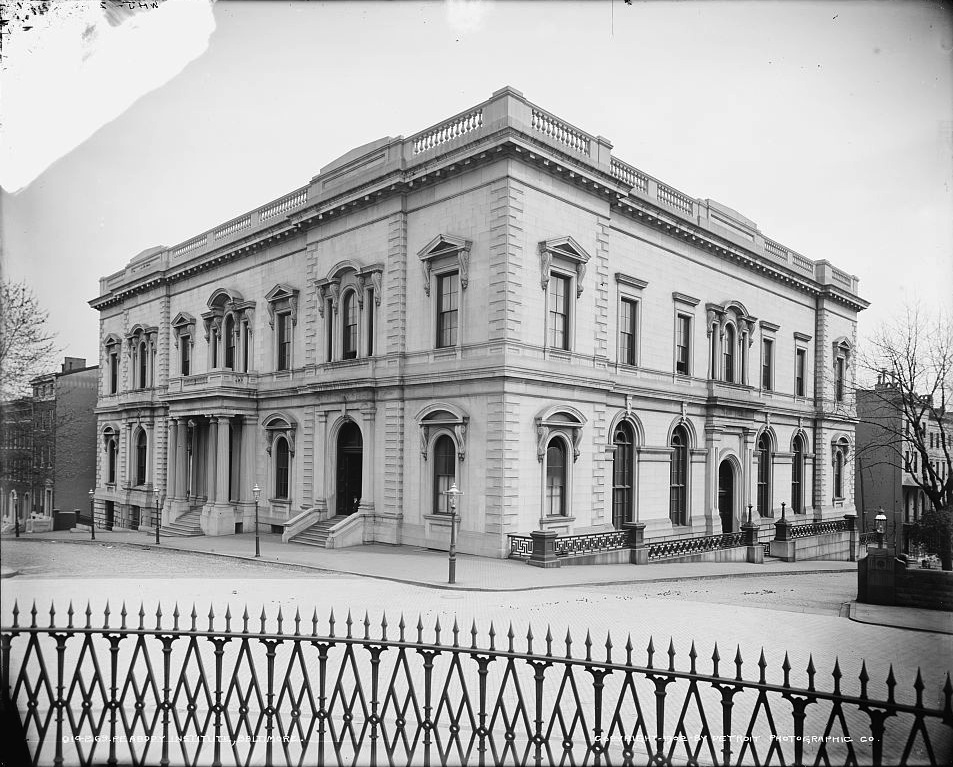
Peabody Institute, prep school in East Mount Vernon Place (1902), which Marbury served (1935–67)

On December 3, 1935, Marbury married Natalie Ingraham Jewett (a Bryn Mawr alumna) previously married to Charles Yandes Wheeler, who had died in 1933 in a car accident; she died on November 18, 1993). They had two daughters, a son, and a stepson: Anne M. Wyatt-Brown, Susan M. Briscoe, Luke Marbury (of Venable, Baetjer and Howard, whose son is grandson Hugh Marbury of DLA Piper) and Charles Yandes Wheeler.

Marbury associated with the Peabody Institute of Baltimore most of his life. He served as trustee (1935–1967), as president (1948–1957), and chairman (1957–1967).

He also served as a member of:

- Advisory board, Center for Advanced Studies, University Virginia (1971–1978)
- Fellow, American Bar Foundation (50-Year award 1984)
- Maryland Bar Foundation (chairman 1973–1975)
- American College Trial Lawyers
- American Academy of Arts and Sciences
- National Institute of Trial Advocacy (director 1971–1976)
- American Law Institute (member council 1946–1980)
- Maryland Institute for Continuing Professional Education Lawyers (president 1976–1978, trustee 1976–1981)
- American Judicature Society (director 1939–1941, Herbert Harley award 1981)
- American Bar Association (member committee judicial conduct 1969)
- Baltimore Bar Association

In 1952, the Harvard Crimson noted that Whittaker Chambers had written in the Saturday Evening Post (which was serializing his memoir, Witness) that "Marbury, a prominent Baltimore lawyer, supported Hiss because the charges against Hiss represented an attack against 'the island of caste'."

Marbury died age 86 on March 5, 1988, at his home in Baltimore.

== Awards ==
- 1945: Presidential Medal for Merit (from U.S. President Harry S. Truman)
- 1970: Honorary Law Degree from Harvard University

== Legacy ==
In addition to his writings, Marbury left many of his papers to the Maryland Historical Society.

In 1987, the Harvard Corporation's president, Nathan M. Pusey, called Marbury "one of the great heroes of the Corporation."

Shortly after his death, the Maryland Legal Services Corporation named after him in 1988 a "William L. Marbury Outstanding Advocate Award."

In 2005, the Johns Hopkins University dedicated the offices of DLA Piper to Marbury's memory.

DLA Piper established a "Marbury Institute" to train lawyers in house.

== Works ==
- "Marbury Replies" (1969)
- The Hiss-Chambers Libel Suit (1981)
- In the Catbird Seat (Baltimore: Maryland Historical Society, 1988)

== See also ==
- Marbury, Miller & Evans
- DLA Piper
- Alger Hiss
- Medal for Merit
- Harvard Corporation
