= Stephanie A. Gallagher =

American judge (born 1972)

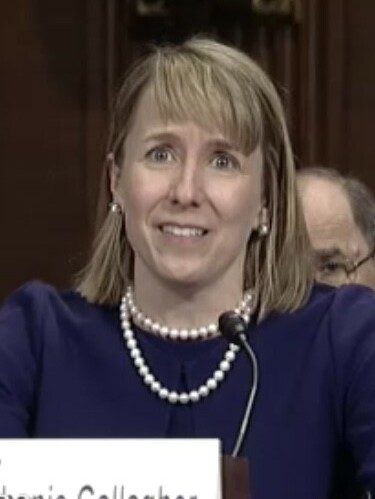
- Gallagher in 2016

Judge of the United States District Court for the District of Maryland
- Incumbent
- Assumed office September 13, 2019
- Appointed by: Donald Trump
- Preceded by: William D. Quarles Jr.

Magistrate Judge of the United States District Court for the District of Maryland
- In office April 18, 2011 – September 13, 2019
- Preceded by: James K. Bredar
- Succeeded by: Deborah Boardman

Personal details
- Born: Stephanie Marie Agli; 1972 (age 53–54) Rockville, Connecticut, U.S.
- Education: Georgetown University (BA); Harvard University (JD)

Stephanie Marie Agli Gallagher (née Agli; born 1972) is a United States district judge of the United States District Court for the District of Maryland and a former United States magistrate judge for the same court.

== Early life and education ==
Gallagher was born in 1972, in Rockville, Connecticut. She received a Bachelor of Arts degree, magna cum laude, in 1994 from Georgetown University with membership in Phi Beta Kappa. She received a Juris Doctor, cum laude, in 1997 from Harvard Law School. She began her legal career as a law clerk to Judge J. Frederick Motz of the United States District Court for the District of Maryland, from 1997 to 1999.

== Career ==
From 1999 to 2001, she served as an associate at the law firm of Akin Gump Strauss Hauer & Feld in Washington, D.C., where she focused on civil litigation and corporate law. From 2002 to 2008, she served as an Assistant United States Attorney in the Criminal Division of the United States Attorney's Office for the District of Maryland, prosecuting illegal drug trafficking and gunrunning. From 2008 to 2011, she was a partner at the law firm of Levin & Gallagher LLC in Baltimore, Maryland, where she focused on white collar criminal defense.

Gallagher serves on the Maryland Chapter of the Federal Bar Association's Board of Governors.

== Federal judicial service ==
=== United States magistrate judge ===
From 2011 to 2019, she served as a United States magistrate judge in the District of Maryland.

=== District court service ===
==== Expired nomination to district court under Obama ====
On September 8, 2015, President Barack Obama nominated Gallagher to serve as a United States District Judge of the United States District Court for the District of Maryland, to the seat vacated by Judge William D. Quarles Jr., who retired on February 1, 2016. She received a hearing before the United States Senate Judiciary Committee on April 20, 2016. On May 19, 2016, her nomination was reported out of committee by voice vote. Her nomination expired on January 3, 2017, with the end of the 114th Congress.

==== Renomination to district court under Trump ====
On June 7, 2018, President Donald Trump announced his intent to renominate Gallagher to serve as a United States district judge of the United States District Court for the District of Maryland. On June 11, 2018, her nomination was sent to the Senate. President Trump nominated Gallagher to the same seat. On October 11, 2018, her nomination was reported out of committee by a 20–1 vote.

On January 3, 2019, her nomination was returned to the President under Rule XXXI, Paragraph 6 of the United States Senate. On April 8, 2019, President Trump announced the renomination of Gallagher to the district court. On May 21, 2019, her nomination was sent to the Senate. On June 20, 2019, her nomination was reported out of committee by a 21–1 vote. On September 11, 2019, the Senate confirmed her nomination by a voice vote. She received her judicial commission on September 13, 2019. She was sworn in on September 15, 2019.

== See also ==
- Barack Obama judicial appointment controversies

Legal offices
Preceded by William D. Quarles Jr.	Judge of the United States District Court for the District of Maryland; 2019–present	Incumbent
