= Theodore D. Chuang =

American judge (born 1969)

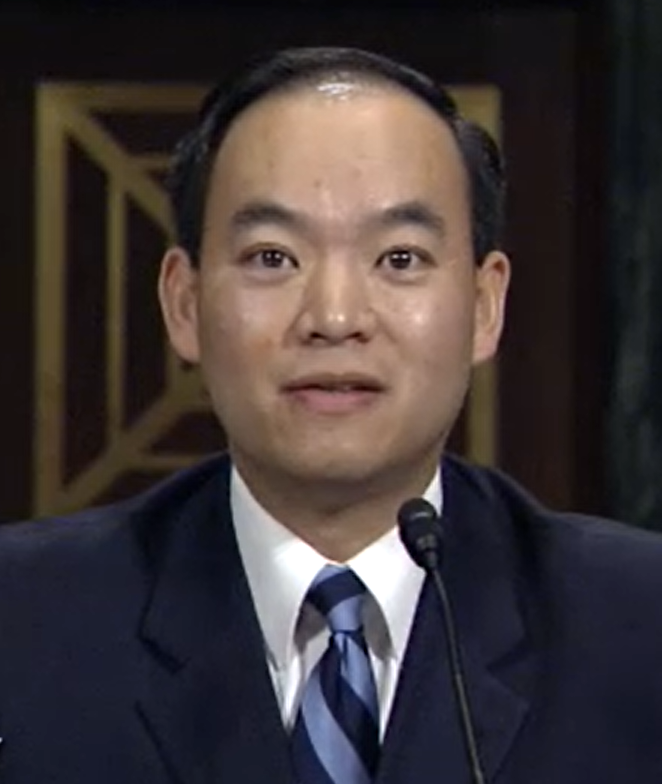
- Chuang in 2013

Judge of the United States District Court for the District of Maryland
- Incumbent
- Assumed office May 2, 2014
- Appointed by: Barack Obama
- Preceded by: Roger W. Titus

Personal details
- Born: Theodore David Chuang; 1969 (age 56–57) Media, Pennsylvania, U.S.
- Education: Harvard University (BA, JD)

Theodore David Chuang (born 1969) is a United States district judge of the United States District Court for the District of Maryland and former deputy general counsel of the United States Department of Homeland Security.

== Early life and education ==
Chuang was born to a Taiwanese American family in Media, Pennsylvania, in 1969. His parents are immigrants from Taiwan. Chuang graduated summa cum laude with his Bachelor of Arts from Harvard University in 1991 and was elected to Phi Beta Kappa. As an undergraduate, he wrote for The Harvard Crimson and won the Endicott Peabody Saltonstall Prize as a top senior at Harvard College. He went on to earn a Juris Doctor, magna cum laude, from Harvard Law School in 1994. As a law student, he served as an editor of the Harvard Law Review.

== Career ==
Chuang began his legal career as a law clerk for Judge Dorothy Wright Nelson of the United States Court of Appeals for the Ninth Circuit, from 1994 to 1995. From 1995 to 1998, he served as a trial attorney in the Civil Rights Division of the United States Department of Justice. From 1998 to 2004, he served as an assistant United States attorney in the District of Massachusetts. He served as counsel at the law firm of Wilmer, Cutler, Pickering, Hale and Dorr LLP in Washington, D.C. from 2004 to 2007. From 2007 to 2009, he was deputy chief investigative counsel for the House Oversight and Government Reform Committee. In 2009, he was chief investigative counsel for the House Committee on Energy and Commerce. From 2009 until his confirmation as a federal judge in 2014, he served as deputy general counsel of the United States Department of Homeland Security.

In 2024, Chuang was elected to serve a six-year term on Harvard's Board of Overseers, a governing body that ensures "the University remains true to its charter as a place of learning."

=== Federal judicial service ===
On September 25, 2013, President Barack Obama nominated Chuang to serve as a United States district judge of the United States District Court for the District of Maryland, to the seat being vacated by Judge Roger W. Titus, who assumed senior status on January 17, 2014. Chuang's nomination was strongly supported by Maryland's two U.S. senators, Ben Cardin and Barbara Mikulski. He was rated "well-qualified" by the American Bar Association's Standing Committee on the Federal Judiciary. On January 16, 2014, his nomination was reported out of the Senate Judiciary Committee by a 10–8 vote. On April 29, 2014, Senate Majority Leader Harry Reid filed for cloture on Chuang's nomination. On May 1, 2014, the Senate invoked cloture on his nomination by a 54–43 vote. Later that day, Chuang was confirmed by a 53–42 vote. He received his judicial commission on May 2, 2014. Chuang sits in Greenbelt, Maryland.

=== Notable rulings ===
==== Mifepristone (2020) ====
On July 13, 2020, Chuang suspended the in-person requirement for women wanting to obtain the abortion pill mifepristone during the COVID-19 epidemic due to public health risks. Chuang affirmed the decision in December 2020 when the Trump administration requested to reinstate that requirement. However, the Supreme Court of the United States subsequently overruled Chuang's decision 6-3, therefore requiring women to obtain the pills in person until at least the end of the Trump presidency.

==== USAID and DOGE (2025–2026) ====
In March 2025, Chuang ruled that President Donald Trump and Elon Musk's dismantling of the United States Agency for International Development (USAID) was likely unconstitutional and blocked Musk and Department of Government Efficiency from continuing the process of shutting down USAID. Chuang ruling was in response to a lawsuit filed by employees of USAID, whose workforce had been reduced by 98 percent through DOGE cuts. This is the first ruling to constrain Musk personally as well as DOGE. The 70-page ruling said that DOGE violated the separation of powers clause by attempting to shut down USAID without congressional approval.

On March 28, 2025, a three-judge panel of the U.S. Court of Appeals for the Fourth Circuit set aside Judge Chuang's order and allowed Elon Musk and his team of analysts to resume their work in helping to dismantle USAID.

In the same case, which Chuang certified as a class action in August 2025, he ruled in February 2026 that Musk could be deposed about his role in shutting down USAID. On March 4, 2026, a divided Fourth Circuit panel granted the Trump administration's petition for a writ of mandamus 2–1 and directed Chuang to issue a protective order barring the depositions of Musk and other officials, holding that he had abused his discretion because the plaintiffs had not first sought the information through other means.

==== Prosecution of John Bolton (2025–2026) ====
Chuang presided over the prosecution of former national security advisor John Bolton, who was indicted in October 2025 on 18 counts of unlawfully transmitting and retaining national defense information. On June 26, 2026, Bolton pleaded guilty before Chuang to one count of retaining national defense information. Under the plea agreement, he faces up to five years in prison and a $2.25 million fine. Sentencing, originally scheduled for October 28, 2026, was moved to December 4, 2026.

==== FBI headquarters (2026) ====
On August 17, 2026, in a lawsuit brought by the state of Maryland and Prince George's County, Chuang blocked the Trump administration's plan to move FBI headquarters into the Ronald Reagan Building in Washington, D.C. He ruled that the FBI and the General Services Administration had exceeded their statutory authority, because Congress had directed that the headquarters be built at one of three sites (Greenbelt or Landover, Maryland, or Springfield, Virginia), and he reinstated Greenbelt, Maryland as the selected location.

== See also ==
- List of Asian American jurists
- List of first minority male lawyers and judges in Maryland

Legal offices
Preceded by Roger W. Titus	Judge of the United States District Court for the District of Maryland; 2014–present	Incumbent
