= Stefan Passantino =

American attorney (born 1966)

Stefan C. Passantino
- Born: August 12, 1966 (age 60); Washington, DC, U.S.
- Education: Drew University (BA); Emory University (JD)

Stefan C. Passantino (born August 12, 1966) is an American lawyer and former head ethics deputy counsel in President Trump's Office of White House Counsel. He is best known for representing witness Cassidy Hutchinson during the Jan 6 Capitol attack House investigation. In January 2023 he was hired by the Trump Organization.

== Legal and public service career ==
=== Early life ===
Passantino graduated from Drew University in 1988, and Emory University School of Law in 1991. Passantino was Managing Editor of the Emory Law Journal. He then clerked for U.S. District Judge Herbert Murray.

=== Private practice and Trump administration ===
He was head of McKenna Long & Aldridge’s political law team until it merged with Dentons in 2015, where Passantino was the head of the political division; he advised clients on issues including campaign contribution rules and disclosure guidelines. Chambers USA 2010 called him one of the leading political lawyers in U.S. and the Washingtonian called him one of the “Best Legal Minds in Washington” in the field of campaign and election law. He is a co-author of Handbook on Corporate Political Activity, a "regular contributor" for media outlets including CNN, Fox News, Bloomberg, The Hill, Roll Call, The Washington Post, NPR, USA Today, and Politico, and was a visiting professor at the University of Georgia School of Law.

Passantino joined the Trump administration in January 2017, serving as deputy counsel to the president, working on compliance and ethics, policing conflicts of interest, and approving and enforcing ethics requirements. His nomination had the strong support of Howard Dean, former Democratic presidential candidate, who opined that Passantino would be clear about ethical boundaries. Newt Gingrich also backed him, stating he would “stand firm for an administration that is above reproach.” A major conflict of interest case that came up during his tenure was Kellyanne Conway's endorsement of Ivanka Trump's clothing line. Passantino ruled that this was an inadvertent error, and there was no disciplinary action.

He left the administration in August 2018, joining Milwaukee-based law firm Michael Best, where Passantino was a partner and led the firm's political law group. On December 21, 2022, he took a leave of absence from the firm. On December 28, 2022, Michael Best said in a statement that the firm had "separated" their relationship with Passantino.

In January 2023, the Trump Organization hired him to assist with congressional inquiries into Donald Trump's business interests.

=== Representation of Cassidy Hutchinson ===
Passantino was the lawyer for Cassidy Hutchinson, a former White House aide who was unemployed at the time, who under subpoena testified before the United States House Select Committee on the January 6 Attack. Trump's Save America political action committee paid Passantino for his representation of Hutchinson, and the committee reported that he did not tell her who was paying him. After she was deposed, Hutchinson received a call from a top aide to former White House chief of staff Mark Meadows saying: "Mark wants me to let you know that he knows you’re loyal, and he knows you’ll do the right thing tomorrow and that you’re going to protect him and the boss." Concerned that her testimony was being conveyed to Trump, and suspecting Passantino's legal team of leaking it to him, but having no evidence of any leak, she terminated Passantino's representation of her.

Hutchinson testified that White House officials anticipated violence days in advance of January 6, that Trump knew supporters at the Ellipse rally were armed with weapons including AR-15s, yet asked to relax security checks at his speech, and that Trump planned to join the crowd at the Capitol and became irate when the Secret Service refused his request. Hutchinson testified that Passantino assured her that "Trump world" would find her a job and keep her in the family. On December 20, 2022, CNN reported that "sources" identified Passantino as the lawyer who urged a key witness to mislead the committee. On December 22, 2022, the committee released the transcript of Hutchinson's interview, describing her interactions with Passantino. The transcript included Hutchinson's testimony that "Stefan never told me to lie" and that "He specifically told me don't want you to perjure yourself." She reiterated that "he didn't tell me to lie. He told me not to lie." A Statement on Behalf of Stefan Passantino asserts that she further testified that Mr. Passantino cautioned her that she could not say that she didn't recall events if she did recall them. Days before her testimony, she dismissed Passantino, replacing him with attorney Jody Hunt. Passantino denied urging her to mislead the panel. The U.S. Congress Committee on House Administration's Subcommittee on Oversight reported that messages were obtained between Farah Griffin and Hutchinson where Hutchinson admitted that Passantino was acting in her best interest and that she agreed with his counsel.

The committee asked the DOJ to examine the facts to see whether prosecution was warranted. No prosecution was made. In March 2023, several dozen "prominent" legal figures (but not Hutchinson) filed a complaint through Lawyers Defending American Democracy with Washington D.C.’s Board on Professional Responsibility seeking to have Passantino's law license revoked on allegations of subornation of perjury, obstruction of justice, witness tampering, and bribery. The Board on Professional Responsibility dismissed the complaint.

In December 2023, Passantino accused the House January 6 committee of spreading false information about his representation of Hutchinson and is seeking $67 million in damages. He filed a Federal Tort Claims Act (FTCA) lawsuit on December 20th in the Northern District of Georgia.

In March 2023, ethics panels in Georgia and Washington, DC dismissed ethics complaints against Passantino.

In October 2024, Passantino filed an Utah State Bar complaint against Michael J. Teter, managing director of The 65 Project, claiming apparent violation of the Bar's Rules of Professional Conduct and other rules regarding Teter's filing of an ethics complaint claiming deficient representation of Hutchinson by Passantino. The same month, Passantino filed a District of Columbia Bar Board on Professional Responsibility complaint against Liz Cheney, the former congresswoman and former vice chair of the U.S. House Select Committee on the January 6 Attack, regarding her communications to Hutchinson while represented by Passantino.

Passantino provided a detailed interview to Tucker Carlson on November 1, 2024 describing his experiences with Hutchinson, the January 6 committee, the bar investigations, and his lawsuit against the Federal government for civil rights violations.

== Political activities ==
Passantino was "national counsel" on Newt Gingrich's 2012 presidential campaign and for former House Speaker Dennis Hastert. He also served as Senator Johnny Isakson's and Senator Roy Blunt's chief election counsel.

In 2019 he founded Elections LLC to advise President Trump's 2020 campaign and other Republican candidates. Elections LLC received about $2 million (~$2.45 million in 2025) from Trump associated PACs. In October 2020, just before the last debate, Passantino met with a Wall Street Journal reporter, reportedly providing information linking Hunter Biden business dealings in China to his father, then president Joe Biden. The story was limited to a stub and noted that then there was no proof of the claim that Joe Biden had profited from his son's dealings.

In 2020 he co-chaired Lawyers for Trump, a national organization of lawyers formed to mobilize support for Trump's reelection campaign. After the 2020 presidential election Passantino sued in court to overturn the results in Georgia, On November 22, 2022, a federal subpoena was served on election officials in several states seeking their records for all communications with Trump or fourteen of his advisers and allies, including Passantino, between June 1, 2020, and January 20, 2021.
