= William M. Nickerson =

American judge (born 1933)

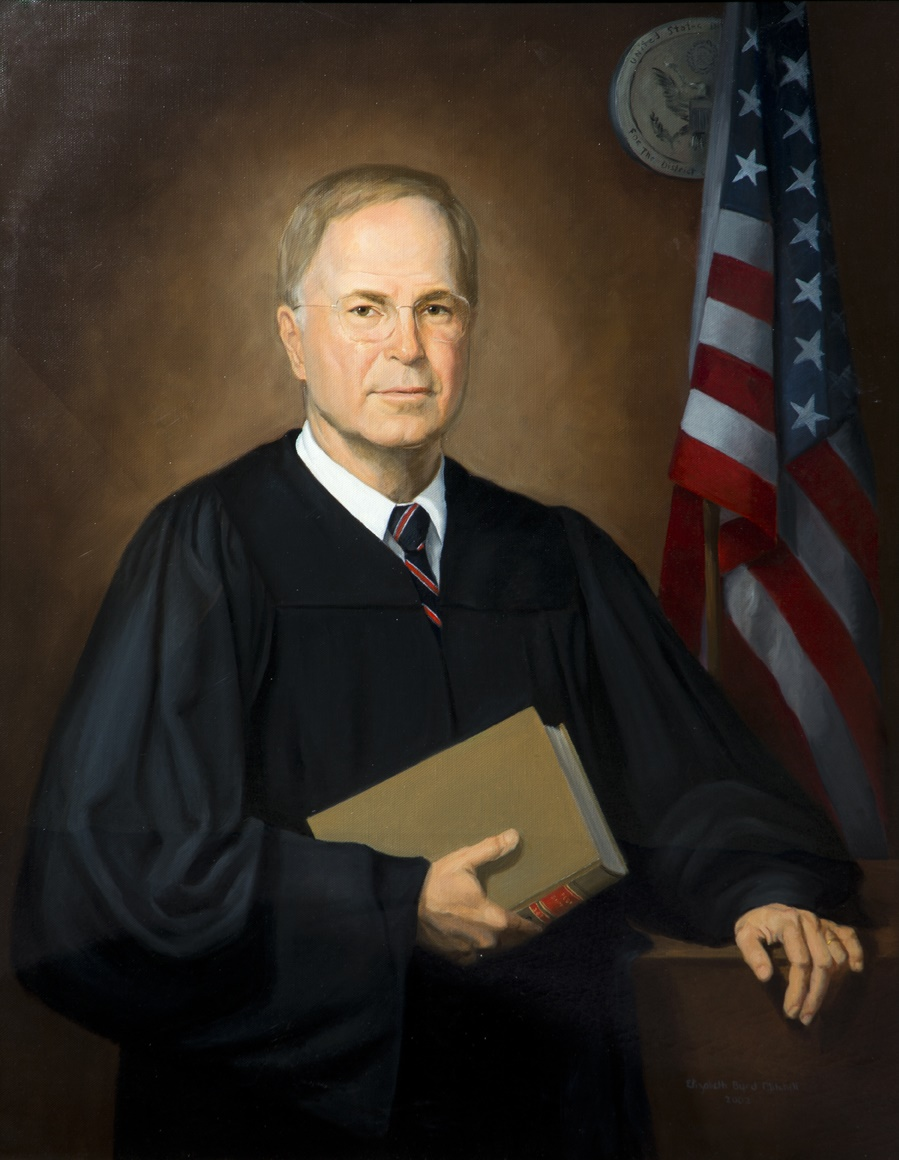

Senior Judge of the United States District Court for the District of Maryland
- Incumbent
- Assumed office June 11, 2002

Judge of the United States District Court for the District of Maryland
- In office May 14, 1990 – June 11, 2002
- Appointed by: George H. W. Bush
- Preceded by: Herbert Frazier Murray
- Succeeded by: William D. Quarles Jr.

Personal details
- Born: William M. Nickerson; December 6, 1933 (age 92) Baltimore, Maryland, U.S.
- Education: University of Virginia (BA); University of Maryland School of Law (LLB)

William M. Nickerson (born December 6, 1933) is an inactive Senior United States district judge of the United States District Court for the District of Maryland.

== Education and career ==
Born in Baltimore, Maryland, Nickerson received a Bachelor of Arts degree from the University of Virginia in 1955 and a Bachelor of Laws from the University of Maryland School of Law in 1962. He was a United States Coast Guard Lieutenant from 1955 to 1959. He was in private practice in Baltimore from 1962 to 1985. He was an associate judge of the Circuit Court for Baltimore County, Maryland from 1985 to 1990.

== Federal judicial service ==
Nickerson was nominated by President George H. W. Bush on January 24, 1990, to a seat on the United States District Court for the District of Maryland vacated by Juge Herbert Frazier Murray. He was confirmed by the United States Senate on May 11, 1990, and received his commission on May 14, 1990. He assumed senior status on June 11, 2002.

== Sources ==
Legal offices
Preceded by Herbert Frazier Murray	Judge of the United States District Court for the District of Maryland; 1990–2002	Succeeded by William D. Quarles Jr.
