= William D. Quarles Jr. =

American judge (born 1948)

William Daniel Quarles Jr.
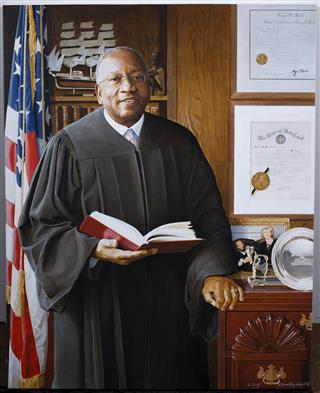

Judge of the United States District Court for the District of Maryland
- In office March 14, 2003 – February 1, 2016
- Appointed by: George W. Bush
- Preceded by: William M. Nickerson
- Succeeded by: Stephanie A. Gallagher

Personal details
- Born: William Daniel Quarles Jr. January 16, 1948 (age 78) Baltimore, Maryland
- Education: Community College of Baltimore (AA); University of Maryland, College Park (BS); Columbus School of Law (JD)

William Daniel Quarles Jr. (born January 16, 1948) is a former United States district judge of the United States District Court for the District of Maryland.

== Background ==
Born in Baltimore, Maryland in 1948, Quarles attended Baltimore City Public Schools and graduated from the Baltimore City College highschool in 1966. He earned an Associate of Arts degree from Community College of Baltimore in 1967, a Bachelor of Science degree from the University of Maryland, College Park in 1976, and a Juris Doctor from the Columbus School of Law at the Catholic University of America in 1979.

== Legal career ==
From 1979 to 1982, Quarles was a law clerk to Judge Joseph C. Howard Sr. of the U.S. District Court for the District of Maryland. After working in private practice from 1981 to 1982, he joined the U.S. Attorney's Office in Baltimore, where he served as an Assistant United States Attorney until 1986. He reentered private practice at Venable LLP in 1986 and remained with the firm until he became an Associate Circuit Judge for the Circuit Court for Baltimore City in 1996.

== Federal judicial service ==
On January 7, 2003, Quarles was named to the federal bench by President George W. Bush, to a seat vacated by William M. Nickerson. Quarles was confirmed by the United States Senate on March 12, 2003, and received his commission on March 14, 2003. He retired from active service on February 1, 2016.

He is the author of Summary Adjudication: Dispositive Motions and Summary Trials (1991).

== See also ==
- List of African-American federal judges
- List of African-American jurists

== Sources ==
Legal offices
Preceded by William M. Nickerson	Judge of the United States District Court for the District of Maryland; 2003–2016	Succeeded by Stephanie A. Gallagher
