= William Calvin Chesnut =

American judge

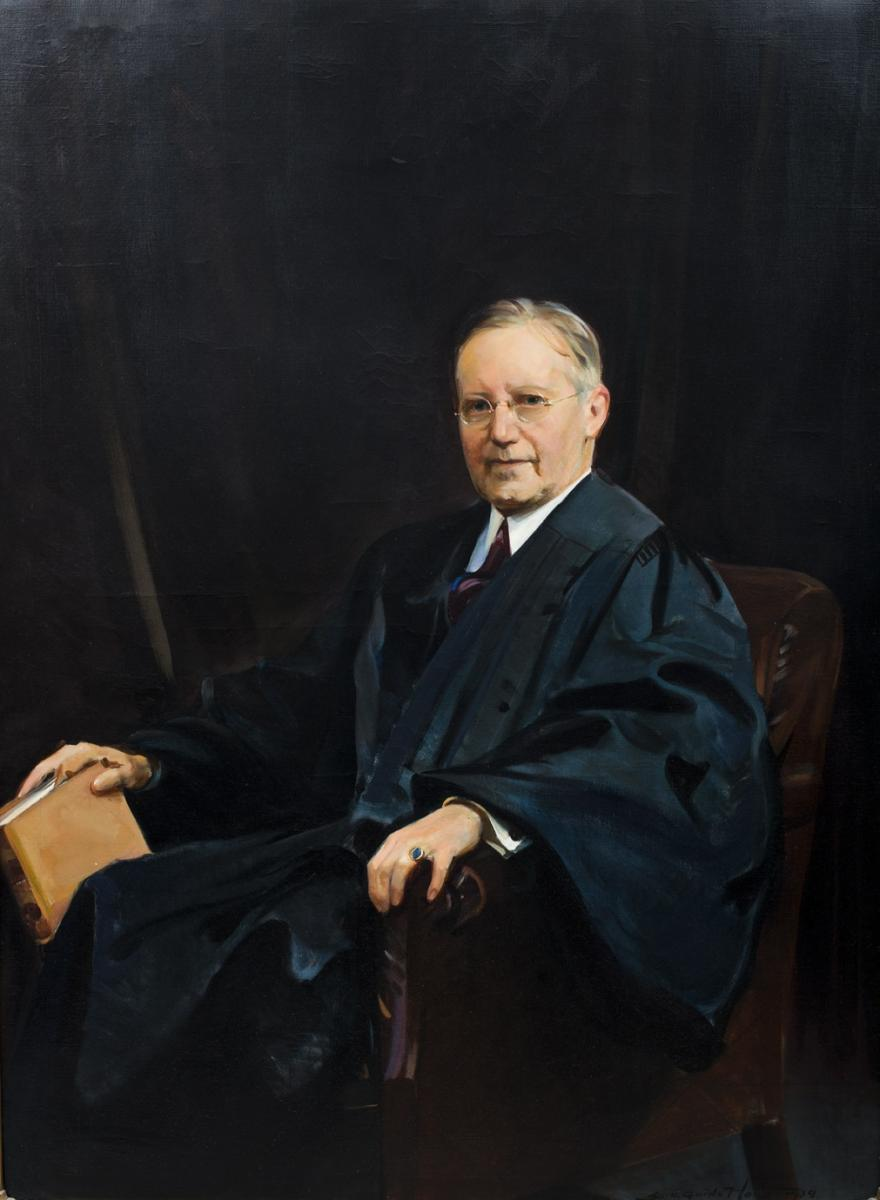

Senior Judge of the United States District Court for the District of Maryland
- In office July 31, 1953 – October 16, 1962

Judge of the United States District Court for the District of Maryland
- In office May 9, 1931 – July 31, 1953
- Appointed by: Herbert Hoover
- Preceded by: Morris Ames Soper
- Succeeded by: Roszel Cathcart Thomsen

Personal details
- Born: William Calvin Chesnut; June 27, 1873 Baltimore, Maryland, U.S.
- Died: October 16, 1962 (aged 89) Baltimore, Maryland, U.S.
- Education: Johns Hopkins University (A.B.); University of Maryland School of Law (LL.B.)

William Calvin Chesnut (June 27, 1873 – October 16, 1962) was a United States district judge of the United States District Court for the District of Maryland.

== Education and career ==
Born in Baltimore, Maryland, Chesnut received an Artium Baccalaureus degree from Johns Hopkins University in 1892 and a Bachelor of Laws from the University of Maryland School of Law in 1894. He was an assistant state's attorney of Baltimore from 1896 to 1899. He was in private practice in Baltimore from 1899 to 1931. He was a lecturer for the University of Maryland School of Law from 1911 to 1931.

== Federal judicial service ==
Chesnut received a recess appointment from President Herbert Hoover on May 9, 1931, to a seat on the United States District Court for the District of Maryland vacated by Judge Morris Ames Soper. He was nominated to the same position by President Hoover on December 15, 1931. He was confirmed by the United States Senate on January 12, 1932, and received his commission the same day. He assumed senior status on July 31, 1953. His service terminated on October 16, 1962, due to his death in Baltimore.

== See also ==
- List of federal judges appointed by Herbert Hoover

Legal offices
Preceded by Morris Ames Soper	Judge of the United States District Court for the District of Maryland; 1931–1953	Succeeded by Roszel Cathcart Thomsen
