= Marbury, Miller & Evans =

Baltimore, Maryland based law firm

- Key people: William L. Marbury, Jr.
- Date founded: First parent firm founded 1854; last organization dated to 1946
- Founder: Charles Marshall (1854)
- Dissolved: Merged into Piper & Marbury (1952), later DLA Piper

Marbury, Miller & Evans was a Baltimore-based law firm.

== Origins ==
Milestones:

- 1854: Charles Marshall law offices
- 1867: Marshall & Fisher
- 1887: Marshall & Hall; Robertson & Marbury
- 1890: Marbury & Bowdoin
- 1893: Marshall, Marbury & Bowdoin; Williams & Bond
- 1903: Marbury & Gosnell
- 1911: Marbury, Gosnell & Williams
- 1946: Marbury, Miller & Evans
- 1952: Piper & Marbury

== Notable achievements ==
Piper & Marbury, from 1854 through 1980, had 76 partners. Law school graduating partners included: 30 from the University of Maryland Law School, 14 from Harvard, 9 from the University of Virginia, 3 from the University of Notre Dame, 2 from Georgetown University, 2 from New York University, and 2 from Yale University, with 1 each from the University of Chicago, Columbia University, Duke University, the University of Michigan, University of Pennsylvania, Rutgers University, Washington & Lee University and Western Reserve University.

Among them, they also served:

- Government:: Partners also served as judges or in judicial function, including city solicitors and U.S. Attorney General or Maryland Attorney General as well as other federal or Maryland State departments as well as Governor of Maryland.
- Community: Members served on boards or staff of: Baltimore Museum of Art, Catholic University, Oxford University, U.S. Foreign Service, National Gallery of Art, University of Maryland, Harvard Corporation, Peabody Institute, Episcopal Diocese of Maryland, and Maryland Institute of Art.

== Notable attorneys, advisors and staff ==
- Charles Marshall: Great-nephew of Chief Justice John Marshall, founded firm in 1854 and worked through 1902 (48 years), interrupted by five years in the Confederate Army as a native Virginian and served as colonel and chief of staff of the Army of Northern Virginia; prepared most of General Robert E. Lee's orders, including Lee's farewell address; accompanied Lee to Appomattox surrender; commended terms by U.S. General Ulysses Grant to writing Marshall.
- William A. Fisher: Joined Marshall to form Marshall & Fisher; left 1882 to join Supreme Bench of Baltimore.
- William L. Marbury, Sr.: Eugenicist who helped draft a plan to disenfranchise African-Americans; argued before the U.S. Supreme Court that states had separate rights to discriminate if they chose (1915).
- William L. Marbury, Jr.: Served as assistant attorney general for the State of Maryland; helped negotiate GATT (1948); defended childhood friend (and alleged Soviet spy) Alger Hiss in Baltimore-based libel suit (1948) and subsequent trials (1949).

== Locations ==
In 1889, Marshall, Marbury & Bowdoin were located in the Glenn Building at 12 St. Paul Street, Baltimore. In 1897, Marbury & Bowdoin moved to the Equitable Building (Baltimore) at Calvert and Fayette Streets. In 1903, Marbury & Gosnell moved to the Maryland Trust Building, where it remained through 1952, when the firm merged to form Piper & Marbury.

== Miscellaneous ==
In 1896, when Marshall, Marbury & Bowdoin were located in the Glenn Building at 12 St. Paul Street, Baltimore, they advertised their "telephone connection."

== See also ==
- DLA Piper
- Charles Marshall (colonel)
- William L. Marbury, Jr.
