= DLA Piper =

Multinational law firm

- No. of attorneys: 4,255 (2022)
- Major practice areas: Arbitration, Banking, Competition and Trade, Corporate Crime, Corporate Finance, Employment, Energy, Government Affairs, Hospitality and Leisure, Insurance, Intellectual Property, Litigation, Mergers and Acquisitions, Pensions, Private Equity, Real Estate, Restructuring, Securities, Tax, Technology
- Key people: Charles Severs; (Global Co-CEO); Frank Ryan; (Global Co-CEO); Jon Hayes; (Global Co-Chair)
- Revenue: US$3.68 billion (2022)
- Profit per equity partner: US$2.8 million (2022)
- Date founded: First parent firm founded 1764; current organization dates to 2005 (by merger)
- Company type: LLP
- Website: dlapiper.com

DLA Piper is a law firm with offices in over 40 countries across the Americas, Asia Pacific, Europe, Africa, and the Middle East.

DLA Piper traces its heritage back to 1780, although the firm in its current form was established in 2005 through the merger of three law firms: San Diego–based Gray Cary Ware & Freidenrich LLP, Baltimore-based Piper Rudnick LLP and United Kingdom–based DLA LLP. DLA Piper operates through multiple separately constituted and regulated legal entities. Until May 1, 2026, its global organization was structured as a Swiss verein, DLA Piper Global, whose members included DLA Piper International LLP and DLA Piper LLP (US). Following a 2026 restructuring, DLA Piper Global was dissolved and replaced by a global LLP overseeing the existing U.S. and International entities.

== History ==
=== Origins ===
DLA Piper's origins can be traced back to four law firms: Dibb Lupton Broomhead, Alsop Stevens, Piper & Marbury, and Rudnick & Wolfe. Dibb Lupton Broomhead was a UK law firm that was formed in 1988 after the merger of Dibb Lupton and Broomhead & Neals. In 1996, the firm merged with the Liverpool-based law firm, Alsop Wilkinson, and became Dibb Lupton Alsop (DLA). Meanwhile, in the United States, Piper & Marbury was founded in Baltimore, Maryland, and merged with Chicago-based Rudnick & Wolfe in 1999 to form Piper Marbury Rudnick & Wolfe.

=== Formation and growth (2005–2010) ===
DLA Piper was formed in 2005 after a merger between DLA, Piper Rudnick, and Gray Cary Ware & Freidenrich. The merger created one of the largest law firms in the world at the time and the largest firm in the UK. In 2006 the firm's name was shortened from DLA Piper Rudnick Gray Cary US LLP to DLA Piper. In 2005, DLA Piper launched New Perimeter, an international pro bono initiative that provides legal assistance in underserved regions.

Throughout this period, the firm continued to open offices in Mexico City and São Paulo, as well as expanding its presence in Europe, the Middle East, and Asia-Pacific. The firm also grew in the Australasian region through a series of mergers and acquisitions, including an exclusive alliance with Australian firm Phillips Fox in 2006. Also in 2006, DLA Piper expanded its Middle Eastern presence by opening an outpost in Doha, Qatar, later opening an office in Abu Dhabi, United Arab Emirates in 2008.

In 2008, DLA Piper opened an office in Kuwait as a joint venture with Kuwaiti law firm Al Wagayan, Al Awadhi & Al Saif to provide legal services to international and local clients operating under the DLA Piper Kuwait moniker. In the US, the firm expanded into areas such as Houston, Texas, where it opened a practice focused on energy law in 2008.

=== Recent developments (Since 2010) ===
In 2010, DLA Piper entered into an cooperative agreement with Brazilian firm Campos Mello Advogados, located in Rio de Janeiro and São Paulo. In 2011, DLA Phillips Fox (Australia) integrated with DLA Piper to become DLA Piper Australia. DLA Phillips Fox (New Zealand) followed suit, becoming DLA Piper New Zealand in 2015. By February 2012, DLA became the largest firm in the world by headcount with over 4,000 attorneys, and opened an office in Paris through a partnership with Frieh Bouhenic.

In 2013–2014, the firm expanded to Seoul, Indonesia, Namibia, Algeria and Mexico City. In 2014, it named Simon Levine managing partner, Global co-Chair and Global co-CEO. His term was extended through 2024 to align with the appointment of Frank Ryan as Americas Chair, Global co-Chair and Global co-CEO in 2021. In 2016, DLA Piper opened an office in San Juan, Puerto Rico. The Portuguese firm ABBC and the Danish firm LETT joined DLA Piper in March 2017. In 2019, DLA Piper opened its Dublin office. In 2023, DLA Piper entered into the digital space and launched TOKO, a blockchain-based tokenisation platform with its Aldersgate Digital Ledger Solutions (DLS) group.

In 2021, DLA Piper was the third largest law firm in the United States by revenue.

In June 2025, former UK Prime Minister, David Cameron, joined the law firm as a consultant.

== Offices ==
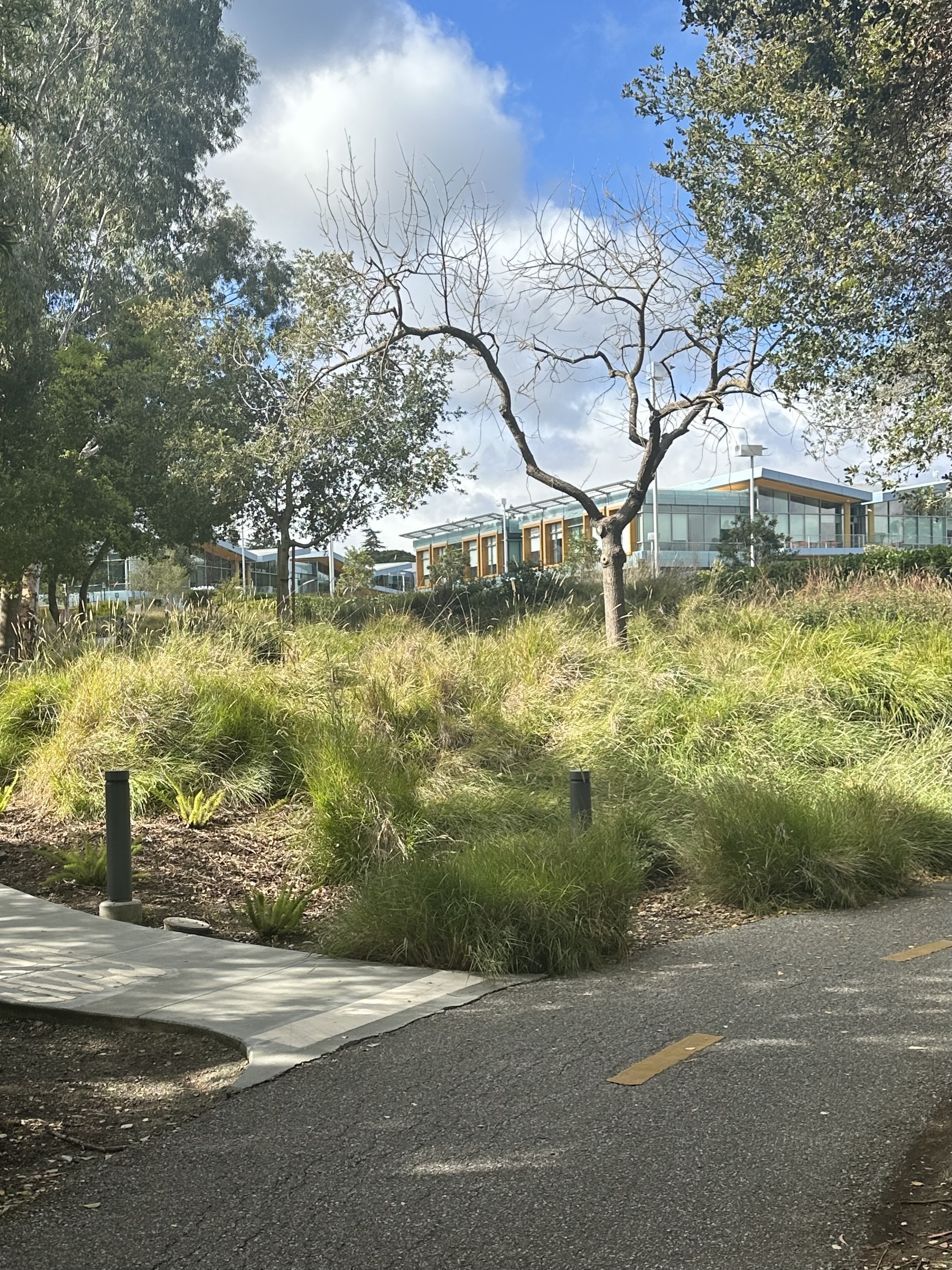
DLA Piper office in Palo Alto, California.

DLA Piper has 80 offices in more than 40 countries across the Americas, Asia Pacific, Australasia, Europe, Africa and the Middle East.

== Political contributions ==
DLA Piper employees were the twelfth-largest donor to President Barack Obama's 2012 re-election campaign. According to OpenSecrets, DLA Piper employees donated $2.19 million to federal candidates during the 2012 election cycle, 73% to Democrats. By comparison, during that same period Akin Gump Strauss Hauer & Feld employees donated $2.56 million, 66% to Democrats, while oil conglomerate ExxonMobil employees donated $2.66 million, 88% to Republicans. Since 1990, DLA Piper has contributed $16.97 million to federal campaigns, and spent over $1 million on lobbying since 2002.

== Revenue and market position ==
DLA Piper is the third-largest law firm in the world by gross revenue, generating approximately $4.24 billion in revenue in 2025, behind only Kirkland & Ellis and Latham & Watkins. The firm's position among the world's highest-earning law firms reflects its extensive international operations and significant presence across corporate, financial, regulatory, and litigation practices. DLA Piper also holds numerous top-tier rankings from Chambers and Partners, including 28 Band 1 practice rankings in the 2026 Chambers USA guide. These rankings include Corporate/M&A, Artificial Intelligence, Franchising, Intellectual Property, Investment Funds, Labor & Employment, Product Liability & Mass Torts, Real Estate, and Retail.

== Notable attorneys, advisors and staff ==
- José María Aznar, former Prime Minister of Spain, has been senior adviser to DLA Piper's Global Board since 2013
- James Blanchard, former Governor of Michigan and former U.S. Ambassador to Canada, has been partner since 1996
- Michael Castle, former Governor of Delaware, has been a partner at DLA Piper since 2011.
- David Cameron, Lord Cameron of Chipping Norton, Former Prime Minister of the United Kingdom (2010–2016) and former Foreign Secretary (2023–2024), who joined DLA Piper as a consultant in June 2025, advising on international affairs and geopolitical risk.
- Saxby Chambliss, former US Senator, has been partner since 2015
- Bart Chilton, former US Commodity Futures Trading Commissioner, was senior policy adviser from 2014 to 2017
- Timothy Clement-Jones, Baron Clement-Jones, Liberal Democrat Peer and former spokesman for the Creative Industries in the House of Lords
- Sir Nigel Knowles was managing partner from 1996 to 2015 and global co-chairman from 2015 to 2016.
- Ray LaHood, former secretary of the Department of Transportation, has been senior policy adviser since 2014
- Former US Senator George Mitchell was DLA Piper's chairman between 2003 and 2009 As of 2012, he is chairman emeritus.
- Richard Burr – Former United States Senator from North Carolina and former chairman of the Senate Select Committee on Intelligence, who joined DLA Piper in 2023 as a principal policy adviser and chair of its Health Policy Strategic Consulting practice.

== Notable former employees ==
- Angela Alsobrooks, United States Senator from Maryland, former DLA Piper clerk
- Dick Armey, former U.S. Representative from Texas's 26th congressional district (1985–2003) and House Majority Leader (1995–2003)
- Rudi M. Brewster, former judge of the United States District Court for the Southern District of California
- Peter Bynoe, attorney and businessman who co-owned the Denver Nuggets
- Tom Daschle, former US Senator and US Senate Majority Leader; policy adviser at DLA Piper, from December 2009 to October 2014.
- Steven J. Davis, earth system scientist at the University of California, Irvine
- Douglas Emhoff, former Second Gentleman of the United States and spouse of former Vice President Kamala Harris
- Jared Genser, international human rights attorney
- Miriam González Durántez, partner at DLA Piper, from 2006 to 2011; spouse of former deputy prime minister of the United Kingdom, Nick Clegg
- A. B. Krongard, former executive director of the Central Intelligence Agency and former chairman and CEO of Alex. Brown & Sons
- Jonathan Lisle, British D.J.
- Mel Martinez, partner and lobbyist for DLA Piper, after retiring as a U.S. Senator from Florida, during 2009 to 2010; Florida chairman for J.P. Morgan Chase & Co; co-chair of the Bipartisan Policy Center
- Harry Cummings McPherson Jr., author, attorney and policymaker who served as counsel and special counsel to President Lyndon B. Johnson, from 1965 to 1969, and as his chief speechwriter, from 1966 to 1969
- Paul Victor Niemeyer, judge of the United States Court of Appeals for the Fourth Circuit and a former Government judge of the United States District Court for the District of Maryland
- Annelies Verlinden, as of February 3, 2025, Minister of Justice in the De Wever government
- Thomas C. Wheeler, judge of the United States Court of Federal Claims
- Helen Winkelmann, first female partner, and youngest ever partner in 1988, and current Chief Justice of the Supreme Court of New Zealand.

== See also ==
- List of largest United States–based law firms by head count
