= Ogren =

Ogren may refer to:

People:

- Paul Anders Ogren (born 1951), American carpenter, farmer, and politician
- Robert E. Ogren (1922–2005), American zoologist
- Ryan Ogren, American singer-songwriter
- Sandra Gardebring Ogren (1947–2010) American jurist, Associate Justice of the Minnesota Supreme Court
- William L. Ogren (1938–2025) American plant physiologist, scientist, and professor

Other:

- Ogren (automobile company)
