= Joan N. Ericksen =

American judge (born 1954)

Joan Ericksen
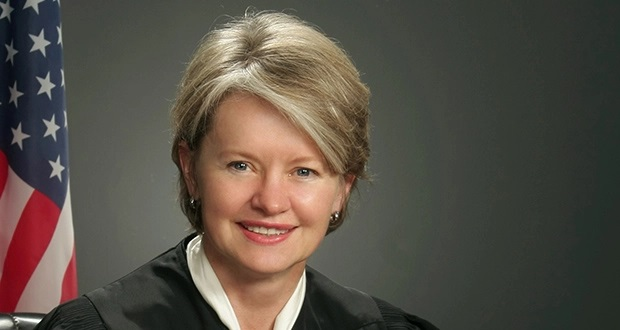

Chief Judge of the United States Alien Terrorist Removal Court
- Incumbent
- Assumed office January 1, 2025
- Appointed by: John Roberts
- Preceded by: James Boasberg

Judge of the United States Foreign Intelligence Surveillance Court
- Incumbent
- Assumed office April 3, 2023
- Appointed by: John Roberts
- Preceded by: Thomas B. Russell

Judge of the United States Alien Terrorist Removal Court
- Incumbent
- Assumed office 2023
- Appointed by: John Roberts

Senior Judge of the United States District Court for the District of Minnesota
- Incumbent
- Assumed office October 15, 2019

Judge of the United States District Court for the District of Minnesota
- In office May 1, 2002 – October 15, 2019
- Appointed by: George W. Bush
- Preceded by: Paul A. Magnuson
- Succeeded by: Katherine M. Menendez

Associate Justice of the Minnesota Supreme Court
- In office September 29, 1998 – May 1, 2002
- Appointed by: Arne Carlson
- Preceded by: Sandra Gardebring Ogren
- Succeeded by: Sam Hanson

Personal details
- Born: Joan Nancy Ericksen; 1954 (age 71–72) St. Paul, Minnesota, U.S.
- Spouse: Peter Lancaster (divorced)
- Children: 2
- Education: St. Olaf College (BA); Hertford College, Oxford (GrDip); University of Minnesota (JD)

Joan Nancy Ericksen (born 1954), formerly Joan Ericksen Lancaster, is an American lawyer and jurist serving as a senior United States district judge of the United States District Court for the District of Minnesota.

== Early life and education ==
Born in St. Paul, Minnesota, Ericksen graduated from St. Olaf College with a Bachelor of Arts degree in 1977 and from University of Minnesota Law School with a Juris Doctor in 1981. She also earned a special diploma of social studies in political theory from Hertford College, Oxford in 1975.

== Career ==
Ericksen began her legal career working in private practice from 1981 to 1983. She was an assistant United States attorney for the District of Minnesota from 1983 to 1993. She was in private practice in Minnesota from 1993 to 1995. She was appointed by Arne Carlson to be a judge on the 4th Judicial District Court for Hennepin County, Minnesota, from 1995 to 1998. She was again appointed by Carlson to succeed Sandra Gardebring Ogren as an associate justice of the Minnesota Supreme Court from 1998 to 2002.

=== Federal judicial service ===
On January 23, 2002, President George W. Bush nominated Ericksen to the United States District Court for the District of Minnesota seat vacated by Judge Paul A. Magnuson. Ericksen was confirmed by the Senate by a 99–0 vote on April 25, and received her commission on May 1. She assumed senior status on October 15, 2019.

Ericksen was appointed as a judge to the United States Alien Terrorist Removal Court in 2023 and designated as the court's chief judge in 2025.

Legal offices
Preceded by Sandra Gardebring Ogren	Associate Justice of the Minnesota Supreme Court; 1998–2002	Succeeded by Sam Hanson
Preceded by Paul A. Magnuson	Judge of the United States District Court for the District of Minnesota; 2002–2019	Succeeded by Katherine M. Menendez
Preceded by Thomas B. Russell	Judge of the United States Foreign Intelligence Surveillance Court; 2023–present	Incumbent
Preceded by James Boasberg	Chief Judge of the United States Alien Terrorist Removal Court; 2025–present	Incumbent
