= United States Alien Terrorist Removal Court =

Special court in the federal judiciary

Alien Terrorist Removal Court of the United States
- (T.R.C.)
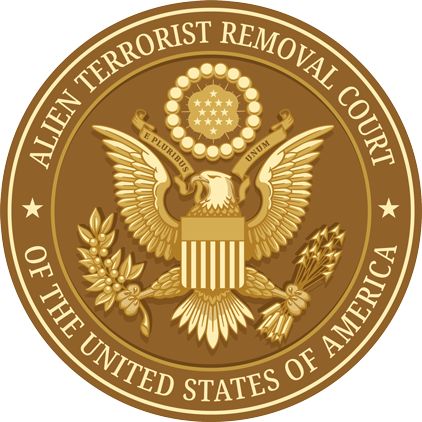
- Location: E. Barrett Prettyman United States Courthouse (Washington, D.C.)
- Appeals to: District of Columbia Circuit
- Established: April 24, 1996
- Authority: Article III court
- Created by: Antiterrorism and Effective Death Penalty Act of 1996; 8 U.S.C. §§ 1531–1537
- Composition method: Chief Justice assignment
- Judges: 5
- Judge term length: 5 years
- Chief Judge: Joan N. Ericksen
- www.atrc.uscourts.gov

The Alien Terrorist Removal Court of the United States (ATRC) is a special court in the U.S. federal judiciary whose purpose is to adjudicate removal proceedings against aliens alleged to be terrorists. The court consists of five Article III judges assigned by the chief justice of the United States. Appeals from the ATRC are taken by the Court of Appeals for the District of Columbia Circuit and then, if certiorari is granted, to the Supreme Court.

== History ==
=== April 1996 to June 2026 ===
The court was created by Section 401 of the Antiterrorism and Effective Death Penalty Act of 1996 (8 U.S.C. §§ 1531–1537). For 30 years after its creation in 1996, the ATRC had conducted no proceedings because no Attorney General had applied for removal proceedings there. While the constitutionality of the ATRC has not been ruled on, legal scholars have speculated that it was left dormant over due process concerns surrounding the possible use of secret evidence in its proceedings.

=== In re Zada (July 2026 to September 2026) ===
On July 15, 2026, U.S. attorney general Todd Blanche submitted the court's first application. Later, on July 30, 2026, the U.S. Department of Justice (DOJ) posted a press release, which specified "Nazira Haji Zada, 47, residing in Fort Worth, Texas", as the person whose removal is sought before the Alien Terrorist Removal Court. Zada is the mother and mother-in-law, respectively, of two Afghan nationals who were convicted in 2024 for their involvement in a foiled Islamic State terror plot. Zada herself was not charged in connection with the plot, but DOJ alleges that she "supported" the plot and "pledged loyalty to ISIS". Matthew Farley, the attorney representing Zada, asked the court for her release from immigration detention and alleged that the "entire [Alien Terrorist Removal Court] scheme is in violation of due process and unconstitutional".

In September 2026, the court issued an order of removal against Nazira Haji Zada. She was subsequently removed to Afghanistan after conceding to her designation as an "alien terrorist" and waiving her right to appeal. This was the first successful DOJ-litigated case before the Alien Terrorist Removal Court since the creation of the court by Congress over three decades earlier.

=== Current ===
As of 2026:

Judge	Judicial district	Date appointed	Term expiry
Joan N. Ericksen (Note: Chief judge.)	District of Minnesota	2023	2028
Kenneth M. Karas	Southern District of New York	2022	2027
Karin Immergut	District of Oregon	2026	2031
Timothy D. DeGiusti	Western District of Oklahoma	2025	2030
Sara Elizabeth Lioi	Northern District Court of Ohio	2025	2030

=== Former ===
As of 2026:

Judge	Judicial district	Date appointed	Term expiry
Alfred M. Wolin	District of New Jersey	1996	2004
Earl H. Carroll	District of Arizona	1996	2006
David Dudley Dowd Jr.	Northern District of Ohio	1996	2014
Michael Anthony Telesca	Western District of New York	1996	2015
William Clark O'Kelley	Northern District of Georgia	1996	2017
James Cacheris	Eastern District of Virginia	2005	2016
Harold Baker	Central District of Illinois	2008	2018
Rosemary M. Collyer	District of Columbia	2016	2020
James Parker Jones	Western District of Virginia	2016	2021
Thomas B. Russell	Western District of Kentucky	2016	2021
Anne C. Conway	Middle District of Florida	2017	2022
Michael W. Mosman	District of Oregon	2018	2023
Liam O'Grady	Eastern District of Virginia	2021	2023
James Boasberg	District of Columbia	2020	2025

== Chief judges ==
Chief Judge
Carroll	1996–2006
Cacheris	2006–2016
Collyer	2016–2020
Boasberg	2020–2025
Ericksen	2025–present

== Succession of seats ==
Seat 1
Seat established on April 24, 1996 by 110 Stat. 1259
Wolin	NJ	1996–2004
Cacheris	VA	2005–2016

Seat 2
Seat established on April 24, 1996 by 110 Stat. 1259
Carroll	AZ	1996–2006
Baker	IL	2008–2018
Mosman	OR	2018–2023

Seat 3
Seat established on April 24, 1996 by 110 Stat. 1259
Dowd, Jr.	OH	1996–2014

Seat 4
Seat established on April 24, 1996 by 110 Stat. 1259
Telesca	NY	1996–2015

Seat 5
Seat established on April 24, 1996 by 110 Stat. 1259
O'Kelley	GA	1996–2017
Conway	FL	2017–2022

== See also ==
- Special Immigration Appeals Commission, a British court with a similar purview
