= Judge Ruiz =

Judge Ruiz may refer to:

- David A. Ruiz (born 1973), judge of the United States District Court for the Northern District of Ohio
- Rodolfo Ruiz (born 1979), judge of the United States District Court for the Southern District of Florida
