= James Boasberg =

American federal judge (born 1963)

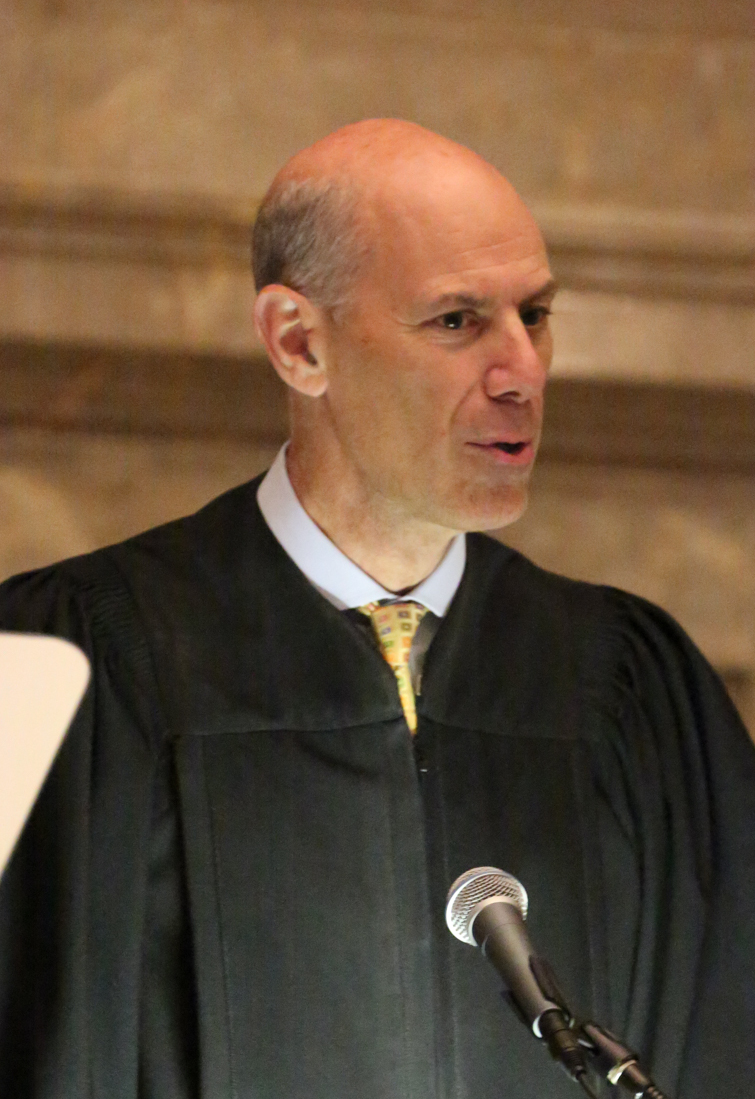
- Boasberg in 2023

Chief Judge of the United States District Court for the District of Columbia
- Incumbent
- Assumed office March 17, 2023
- Preceded by: Beryl Howell

Chief Judge of the United States Alien Terrorist Removal Court
- In office January 1, 2020 – January 1, 2025
- Preceded by: Rosemary M. Collyer
- Succeeded by: Joan N. Ericksen

Judge of the United States Alien Terrorist Removal Court
- In office January 1, 2020 – January 1, 2025
- Appointed by: John Roberts
- Preceded by: Rosemary M. Collyer
- Succeeded by: Sara Elizabeth Lioi

Presiding Judge of the United States Foreign Intelligence Surveillance Court
- In office January 1, 2020 – May 19, 2021
- Preceded by: Rosemary M. Collyer
- Succeeded by: Rudolph Contreras

Judge of the United States Foreign Intelligence Surveillance Court
- In office May 18, 2014 – May 19, 2021
- Appointed by: John Roberts
- Preceded by: Reggie Walton
- Succeeded by: Amit Mehta

Judge of the United States District Court for the District of Columbia
- Incumbent
- Assumed office March 17, 2011
- Appointed by: Barack Obama
- Preceded by: Thomas F. Hogan

Judge of the Superior Court of the District of Columbia
- In office September 2002 – March 14, 2011
- Appointed by: George W. Bush
- Preceded by: Gregory Mize
- Succeeded by: John F. McCabe

Personal details
- Born: James Emanuel Boasberg; 1963 (age 62–63) San Francisco, California, U.S.
- Spouse: Elizabeth Manson (m. 1991)
- Education: Yale University (BA, JD); St Peter's College, Oxford (MSt)

James Emanuel "Jeb" Boasberg (born 1963) is an American lawyer and jurist serving as the chief judge of the United States District Court for the District of Columbia. He was appointed in 2011 by President Barack Obama and was unanimously confirmed by the U.S. Senate. Boasberg previously served as a judge of the Superior Court of the District of Columbia from 2002 to 2011, having been appointed by President George W. Bush.

Chief Justice John Roberts appointed Boasberg to the United States Foreign Intelligence Surveillance Court (FISC) in 2014, and he served as the presiding judge of the FISC from 2020 to 2021. In 2020, he was appointed to the United States Alien Terrorist Removal Court and designated chief judge.

== Early life and education ==
Boasberg was born in San Francisco, California, in 1963, into a Jewish family, his parents being Sarah Margaret (née Szold) and Emanuel Boasberg III. The following year, the family moved to Washington, D.C., where Boasberg grew up, after his father accepted a position in the Office of Economic Opportunity, which played a key role in implementing many of President Lyndon B. Johnson's War on Poverty programs. James and his younger brother Tom both attended St. Albans School, an Episcopal college prep academy in Washington.

After graduating from St. Albans in 1981, Boasberg attended Yale University, where he was a member of the undergraduate society Skull and Bones. Standing 6 feet 6 inches (1.98 m) tall, Boasberg also played forward for the Yale Bulldogs men's basketball team. He graduated in 1985 with a Bachelor of Arts degree, magna cum laude. The following year, he earned a Master of Studies degree from St Peter's College, Oxford. From 1986 to 1987, Boasberg worked as a history teacher and women's basketball coach at Horace Mann School in New York City. He then attended Yale Law School, where he was a classmate of, and lived in a group house with, future U.S. Supreme Court justice Brett Kavanaugh. He graduated in 1990 with a Juris Doctor degree.

== Clerkship and legal career, 1990–2001 ==
After completing law school, Boasberg served from 1990 to 1991 as a law clerk for Judge Dorothy Wright Nelson of the U.S. Court of Appeals for the Ninth Circuit in San Francisco. He then went into private practice, working from 1991 to 1994 in San Francisco at Keker, Brockett & Van Nest (now Keker, Van Nest & Peters LLP) and from 1995 to 1996 in the District of Columbia at Kellogg, Hansen, Todd, Figel & Frederick. While at Kellogg, he was briefly colleagues with Neil Gorsuch.

In 1996, Boasberg joined the office of the United States Attorney for the District of Columbia, where he spent five and a half years as a prosecutor, specializing in homicides.

== Judicial service, 2002–present ==
On March 12, 2002, after Judge Gregory E. Mize retired from the Superior Court of the District of Columbia, the District of Columbia Judicial Nomination Commission recommended Boasberg, Noël A. Brennan, and Brian F. Holeman as potential replacements. President George W. Bush nominated Boasberg on May 13, 2002. On July 25, 2002, the Senate Committee on Governmental Affairs favorably reported out his nomination by voice vote. The full Senate confirmed his nomination by voice vote on August 1, 2002. Boasberg officially took his commission as an associate judge of the Superior Court of the District of Columbia, in September 2002, for a term of 15 years. He served in the civil and criminal divisions and the domestic violence branch until his appointment to the federal bench in 2011.

During the 111th Congress, Delegate Eleanor Holmes Norton recommended Boasberg to fill a judicial vacancy on the United States District Court for the District of Columbia. On June 17, 2010, President Barack Obama formally nominated Boasberg to the district court for the District of Columbia. Boasberg was confirmed on March 14, 2011, by a 96–0 vote. He received his commission on March 17, 2011. He became the chief judge on March 17, 2023.

Boasberg is considered a feeder judge who sends many of his law clerks to clerk for Supreme Court justices.

=== Appointment to United States Foreign Intelligence Surveillance Court, 2014–2021 ===
On February 7, 2014, Chief Justice John G. Roberts announced that he would appoint Boasberg to the United States Foreign Intelligence Surveillance Court (FISC) for a term starting May 18, 2014, to a seat being vacated by Reggie Walton. His term began May 18, 2014. On December 20, 2019, the FISC announced he would replace the presiding judge on January 1, 2020 and be elevated to that role. His term as presiding judge and judge of the FISC ended on May 19, 2021.

=== Appointment to supervise FISA reforms ===
After a special appointment to oversee FISA court reforms, the judge made orders and procedures to the FISA court following the irregularities and criminal offenses discovered by Department of Justice Inspector General Michael E. Horowitz in his Crossfire Hurricane investigation report. Presiding over the trial and sentencing of Kevin Clinesmith for altering an email that was used in the FISA filing for an investigation of Trump presidential advisor Carter Page, Boasberg gave Clinesmith probation rather than the recommended prison time.

=== Appointment to Alien Terrorist Removal court ===
In 2020, he was appointed to the United States Alien Terrorist Removal Court and designated chief judge. His term ended in 2025.

=== Notable rulings ===
==== Osama Bin Laden photos ====
On April 26, 2012, Boasberg ruled that the public had no right to view government photos of a deceased Osama bin Laden. Judicial Watch, a conservative legal group, had filed a request under the Freedom of Information Act (FOIA), but was unsuccessful in convincing Boasberg that FOIA rights outweighed national-security factors.

==== Hillary Clinton emails ====
On August 22, 2016, Boasberg ordered the release of over 14,000 emails found in the United States Department of State correspondence of Hillary Clinton by the FBI during an investigation of Clinton's private server. These emails were requested by Judicial Watch, a conservative legal group, because the FBI had indicated that the emails were work-related and not entirely private, as Clinton had previously said.

==== Trump tax returns ====
On August 18, 2017, Boasberg dismissed a lawsuit from the Electronic Privacy Information Center (EPIC), which had sued the IRS under FOIA seeking President Donald Trump's personal tax returns from 2010 to the present to be released. Boasberg concluded that because personal tax returns are confidential, they may only be obtained either by permission from Trump himself or if Congress' joint committee on taxation signed off to allow the disclosure.

==== Medicaid work rules ====
On March 27, 2019, Boasberg blocked a work requirement for recipients of Medicaid in Arkansas and Kentucky.

==== Dakota Access Pipeline ====
Boasberg has presided over litigation concerning the Dakota Access Pipeline since 2016.

On March 25, 2020, Boasberg ordered a sweeping new environmental review by the Army Corps of Engineers of the Dakota Access Pipeline.

In a subsequent decision on July 6, 2020, he vacated an easement to cross the Missouri River pending completion of the environmental review and ordered the pipeline to be emptied within 30 days. On August 5, a three-judge panel of the United States Court of Appeals for the District of Columbia Circuit upheld the ruling regarding the easement; however, the judges vacated the order to empty the pipeline and asked the Army Corps of Engineers to submit a follow-up brief on whether they would allow continued pipeline operation without the easement.

==== North Atlantic right whale ====
On April 9, 2020, Boasberg issued an opinion finding that the National Marine Fisheries Service violated the Endangered Species Act when it issued a biological opinion in 2014 allowing for the accidental killings of North Atlantic right whales, of which only about 400 remained as of April 8, 2020; by the American lobster fishery, which consists of seven areas spanning the east coast from Maine to North Carolina.

==== Kevin Clinesmith sentencing ====
In January 2021, Boasberg sentenced former FBI lawyer Kevin Clinesmith to 12 month's probation and 400 hours community service after Clinesmith pleaded guilty to altering a CIA email used in a FISA renewal application for Carter Page. The case was brought by Special Counsel John Durham. Prosecutors had sought prison time, arguing the alteration caused "immeasurable" harm to public trust. Boasberg, who was also presiding judge of the Foreign Intelligence Surveillance Court, declined, stating Clinesmith "likely believed" the information he inserted was true and was "taking an inappropriate shortcut." Boasberg noted the DOJ Inspector General had found no evidence Clinesmith acted with political bias.

==== J.G.G. v. Trump ====
J.G.G. v. Donald J. Trump is a class action and habeas corpus lawsuit filed by five Venezuelan men in U.S. Immigration and Customs Enforcement custody who were threatened with removal under a proclamation from President Donald Trump invoking the Alien Enemies Act of 1798.

On March 15, 2025, Boasberg issued a 14-day restraining order, stating that he did not believe federal law permits the Trump administration to bypass removal proceedings in this manner, noting there is no historical precedent for such deportations when Congress has not made a declaration of war. The administration allowed deportation flights to proceed despite the order.

In April 2025, Boasberg found probable cause that the Trump administration had committed criminal contempt for violating his March 15 orders. The D.C. Circuit Court of Appeals stayed contempt proceedings in December 2025, and shut down the contempt investigation in April 2026 – calling it, in Judge Neomi Rao's majority opinion, a "judicial intrusion into the autonomy of a coequal department."

On December 22, 2025, Boasberg ruled that 137 men deported under the Alien Enemies Act had been denied due process and ordered the administration to either facilitate their return to the United States or provide hearings by January 5, 2026.

==== American Oversight v. Hegseth ====
American Oversight v. Hegseth is a pending lawsuit in the United States District Court for the District of Columbia. The case, submitted by watchdog group American Oversight, concerns allegations that officials in the Trump administration unlawfully used the encrypted Signal messaging app to discuss sensitive military operations, in violation of federal record-keeping laws. Chief Judge James Boasberg was randomly assigned to the case.

The "Houthi PC small group" chat was a messaging thread involving senior officials of the Trump administration in March 2025, including Secretary of Defense Pete Hegseth, National Security Adviser Mike Waltz, CIA Director John Ratcliffe, Director of National Intelligence Tulsi Gabbard, and Vice President JD Vance. The group discussed operational details related to a U.S. military strike on Houthi targets in Yemen on March 15, 2025.

==== Meta antitrust trial ====
In November 2025, Boasberg ruled in favor of Meta Platforms in the case of FTC v. Meta, an antitrust lawsuit originally filed against the company in 2020, with Boasberg finding that the Federal Trade Commission did not demonstrate that Meta held a monopoly in social networking.

== Criticism by Republican politicians ==
=== J.G.G. v. Trump impeachment resolution ===
On March 17, 2025, following Boasberg's ruling in J.G.G. v. Trump blocking use of the Alien Enemies Act for deportations, Trump posted on social media that Boasberg was a "Radical Left Lunatic of a Judge, a troublemaker and agitator" and called for his impeachment. The same day, Representative Brandon Gill introduced an impeachment resolution (H.Res.270) in the House of Representatives. In a rare public statement, Chief Justice John Roberts responded: "For more than two centuries, it has been established that impeachment is not an appropriate response to disagreement concerning a judicial decision."

=== Dismissed DOJ misconduct complaint ===
On July 28, 2025, Pam Bondi tweeted "today at my direction, @TheJusticeDept filed a misconduct complaint against U.S. District Court Chief Judge James Boasberg for making improper public comments about President Trump and his Administration." The administration's complaint was signed by Chad Mizelle. Mizelle previously signed a misconduct complaint against Ana C. Reyes. In December 2025, Judge Jeffrey Sutton dismissed the complaint. Reportedly, the administration's complaint was based on a piece on the website The Federalist that alleged:

During the week of March 11, 2025, members of the Judicial Conference met in Washington, D.C., for the first of its two regular meetings. (...) Federal judge James Boasberg advised Chief Justice John Roberts and some two dozen other judges that his D.C. colleagues were “concern[ed] that the Administration would disregard rulings of federal courts leading to a constitutional crisis,” according to a memorandum obtained exclusively by The Federalist.

— Margot Cleveland (July 16, 2025),

The 28 July 2025 complaint alleges that "on March 11, 2025, at one of the Conference’s semiannual meetings, Judge Boasberg disregarded its history, tradition, and purpose to push a wholly unsolicited discussion about 'concerns that the Administration would disregard rulings of federal courts, leading to a constitutional crisis.'" According to Sutton:

The complaint, however, did not include the attachment. The D.C. Circuit contacted the Department about the missing attachment and explained that, if it failed to submit the attachment, the circuit would consider the complaint as submitted. The Department did not supply the attachment.
In the absence of the attachment, the complaint offers no source for what, if anything, the subject judge said during the Conference, when he said it, whether he said it in response to a question, whether he said it during the Conference or at another meeting, and whether he expressed these concerns as his own or as those of other judges. Later in the complaint, to be sure, the Department refers to a Fox News clip discussing the same allegation. But it does not identify any source, contain any specifics, or answer any of the above questions. A recycling of unadorned allegations with no reference to a source does not corroborate them. And a repetition of uncorroborated statements rarely supplies a basis for a valid misconduct complaint.

Sutton additionally wrote that even assuming that Boasberg had made the statements of which he was accused at the time of which he was accused, "in these settings, a judge's expression of anxiety about executive-branch compliance with judicial orders, whether rightly feared or not, is not so far afield from customary topics at these meetings — judicial independence, judicial security, and inter-branch relations — as to violate the Codes of Judicial Conduct".

=== Arctic Frost impeachment resolution ===
On November 4, 2025, Representative Brandon Gill filed articles of impeachment against Boasberg following disclosures that he had signed subpoenas and nondisclosure orders as part of the FBI's Arctic Frost investigation. The resolution accused Boasberg of "abuse of power" for approving nondisclosure orders that prevented senators whose phone records were subpoenaed from being notified.

The Administrative Office of U.S. Courts stated that DOJ nondisclosure order requests "typically do not attach the related subpoena" but instead "identify the subject accounts only by a signifier," such as a phone number, meaning that Boasberg likely did not know that the targets were members of Congress. Jack Smith confirmed this in his December 2025 deposition, stating "I don't think we identified that, because I don't think that was Department policy at the time."

Senator Sheldon Whitehouse, the ranking Democrat on the Senate Judiciary subcommittee, responded: "Impeachment is a wholly improper remedy when you disagree with a ruling from a federal judge, and lawmakers shouldn't be feeding into threats against the judiciary with a hearing like this." Boasberg and another targeted judge declined invitations to testify at a Senate Judiciary subcommittee hearing scheduled for December 3, 2025. Roll Call reported that impeachment efforts had "stalled in the House" amid concerns about "breaking with a centuries-old tradition of not ousting judges based solely on their decisions."

=== Senators' suspension request ===
On November 17, 2025, six Republican senators, led by Eric Schmitt and including Mike Lee, Tommy Tuberville, Lindsey Graham, Kevin Cramer, and Bill Hagerty, sent a letter to United States Court of Appeals for the District of Columbia Circuit Chief Judge Sri Srinivasan demanding Boasberg's administrative suspension pending impeachment proceedings. The letter cited both the July 28 DOJ misconduct complaint and Boasberg's role in the Arctic Frost investigation, and invoked the precedent of Judge Thomas Porteous, who was administratively suspended during his 2010 impeachment. The senators requested written responses regarding any action taken on the misconduct complaint and justification for any inaction. As of December 2025, Srinivasan had not publicly responded to either the July misconduct complaint or the senators' letter.

== Personal life ==
Boasberg married Elizabeth Leslie Manson in 1991. His brother, Tom Boasberg, succeeded Michael Bennet as Superintendent of Denver Public Schools after Colorado Governor Bill Ritter appointed Bennet to the United States Senate in January 2009.

== See also ==
- Medicaid expansion
- Efforts to repeal the Patient Protection and Affordable Care Act

Legal offices
Preceded by Thomas F. Hogan	Judge of the United States District Court for the District of Columbia; 2011–present	Incumbent
Preceded by Beryl Howell	Chief Judge of the United States District Court for the District of Columbia; 2023–present	Incumbent
Preceded by Reggie Walton	Judge of the United States Foreign Intelligence Surveillance Court; 2014–2021	Succeeded by Amit Mehta
Preceded by Rosemary M. Collyer	Presiding Judge of the United States Foreign Intelligence Surveillance Court; 2020–2021	Succeeded by Rudolph Contreras
Preceded by Rosemary M. Collyer	Judge of the United States Alien Terrorist Removal Court; 2020–2025	Succeeded by Sara Elizabeth Lioi
Preceded by Rosemary M. Collyer	Chief Judge of the United States Alien Terrorist Removal Court; 2020–2025	Succeeded by Joan N. Ericksen
