= Hazel M. Walker =

American lawyer

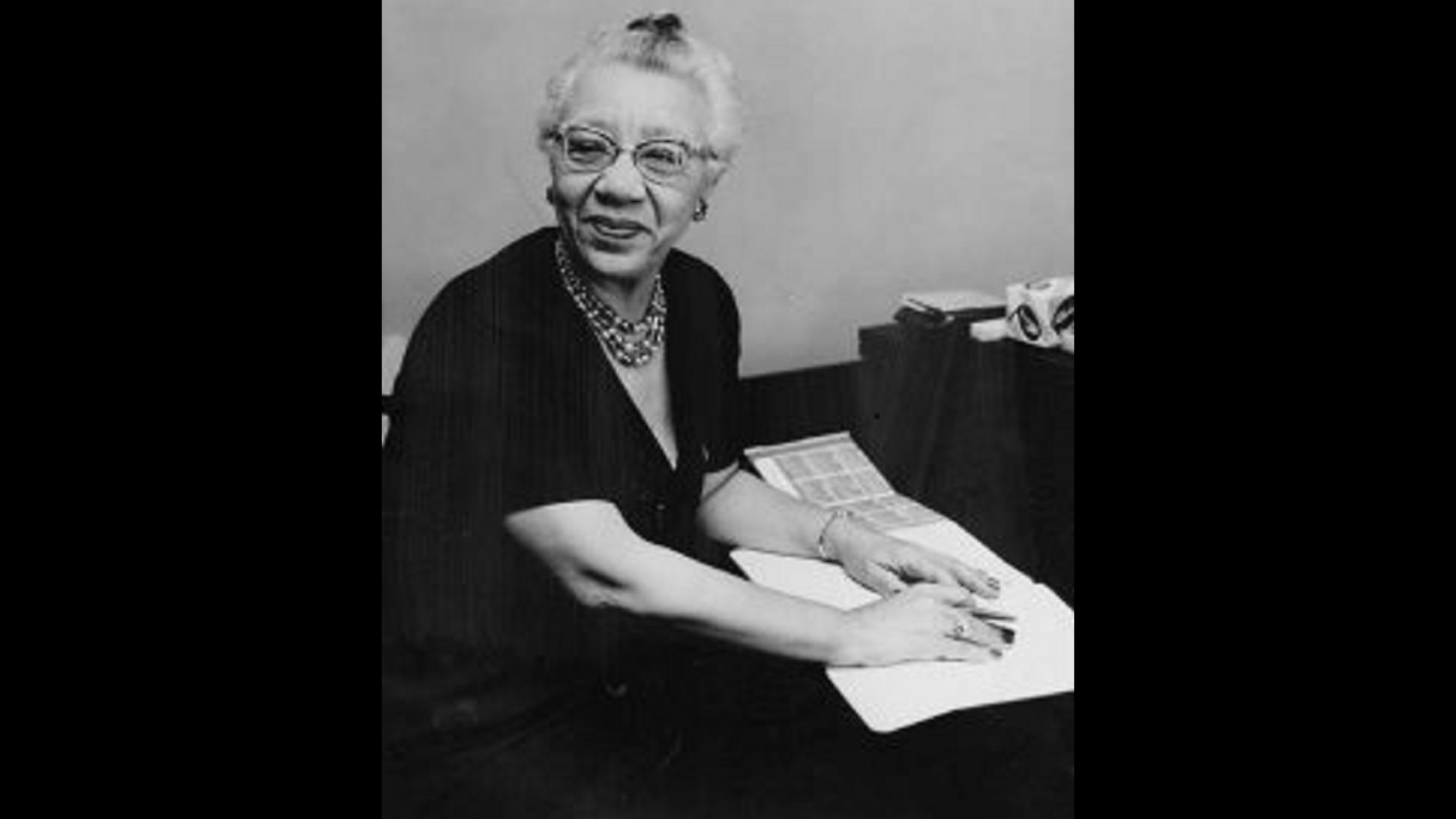
Hazel Mountain Walker

Hazel Mountain Walker (February 16, 1889 – May 16, 1980) was among the first African-American women to pass the Ohio bar.

== Biography ==
Hazel Mountain Walker was born on February 16, 1889, in Warren, Ohio, to Charles Mountain and Alice Bronson. She graduated from the Cleveland Normal Training School and worked as an elementary school teacher from 1909 to 1936. She earned her law degree from the Baldwin-Wallace College in 1919 and was admitted that same year to practice law in Ohio. Deciding to forgo practicing as an attorney, Walker instead opted to provide educational services to the juvenile courts. Thus, Daisy D. Perkins (who was also admitted to practice law in 1919) has the distinction of being Ohio's first African-American female lawyer. Walker earned a bachelor's degree and master's degree in education from Western Reserve University respectively by 1941. She continued working in the educational field, and even served as the principal for several primary schools.

Walker earned her degree and passed the bar in 1919; her motivation was not to become a lawyer but to prove that Black women could become lawyers. Walker is attributed with naming Karamu House in 1924, where she was a member and actress. Walker taught students from homes without spoken English and/or their families could not read at the Mayflower Elementary School from 1909-36. She also tutored Black children from the juvenile court system who were from the South and having trouble adjusting to Cleveland schools.

Walker died on May 16, 1980, in Cleveland, Ohio.

== Experience ==
- 1909: She got her first teaching job earning $45/month at Mayflower Elementary School
- 1919: she earned a law degree from Cleveland Law School, the first law school in Ohio to admit women. (It later became the law department of Baldwin Wallace University and then merged with Cleveland-Marshall School of Law.)
- 1924: She was a part of the women’s committee for the Republican National Convention in Cleveland
- 1932: She was a part of the central committee of the Cuyahoga County Republican Party
- 1936: She became the principal of Rutherford B. Hayes Elementary School (the system’s first black woman to do so).
- 1939: She received a Bachelor of Science degree from Western Reserve University (now Case Western Reserve University).
- 1941: She received a Master's degree from Western Reserve University (now Case Western Reserve University).
- 1943: Appointed to the Cleveland Womanpower Committee to advise on the integration of black women into the war-time work force
- 1957: one of five black women in the Women’s City Club

== See also ==
- List of first women lawyers and judges in Ohio
