= Esther Allen Gaw =

American college dean

- Esther Allen Gaw, from the 1943 yearbook of Ohio State University
- Born: December 28, 1879; Hudson, Ohio
- Died: December 27, 1973 (aged 95); Sonoma, California
- Occupation(s): Psychologist, professor, college administrator
- Parent: Clarence Emir Allen
- Relatives: Florence Ellinwood Allen (sister), Bryant Tuckerman (cousin)

Esther Tuckerman Allen Gaw (December 28, 1879 – December 27, 1973) was an American psychologist and college administrator. She was Dean of Women at Ohio State University from 1927 to 1944.

== Early life and education ==
Esther Tuckerman Allen was born in Hudson, Ohio, and raised in Salt Lake City, Utah, the daughter of Clarence Emir Allen and Corinne Tuckerman Allen. Her father was an educator, a lawyer and a Congressman, and her mother, a Smith College alumna, was an educational reformer and philanthropist. Her younger sister Florence Ellinwood Allen was a suffragist and a judge. Physicist Louis B. Tuckerman was her uncle, and his son, mathematician Bryant Tuckerman, was her cousin.

Allen graduated from Western Reserve University. She studied violin at the Stern Conservatory in Berlin, and earned a PhD at the University of Iowa in 1919.

== Career ==
Gaw played violin and taught music in Salt Lake City as a young woman, and was founder and conductor of the Salt Lake Woman's Orchestra in 1914. She and two other women founded the University Club of Iowa City in 1917. She taught at San Francisco State Teachers College, and was Associate Dean of Women at Mills College, where she was also a professor of psychology. She was the Dean of Women at Ohio State University from 1927 until 1944. She was a speaker and lecturer on women's education and Latin America. In 1939 she attended the Pan-American Union's Peace Conference held in Lima, Peru.

In retirement, Gaw lived in California, where she was active in adult education and continued her international travels. She donated her mother's papers to the Harvard Racliffe Institute in 1952.

== Publications ==
Gaw published her academic research and writing in scholarly journals including Psychological Monographs, The Journal of Higher Education, The Journal of Educational Research, Educational Research Bulletin, The Psychological Clinic, Bulletin of the Pan American Union, and Pi Lambda Theta Journal.

- "A Revision of the Consonance Test" (1918)
- "The Talent Survey in our Music School" (1920)
- "A survey of musical talent in music school" (1922)
- "Some Individual Difficulties in the Study of Music" (1922)
- "Five Studies of the Music Tests" (1928)
- "Social Education" (1930)
- "Techniques for Social Education" (1930)
- "Teaching Student Assistants to Use Objective Aids in Their Interviews with Younger Students" (1930)
- "Advising Means Administration" (1933)
- "The University of Chile and its Summer School" (1938)
- "Education in Chile" (1938)
- "Five Women of South America: Pioneering Educators of Peru and Chile" (1939)
- "We the Deans" (1940)
- "Heredia, Costa Rica" (1941)
- "Case-Study Techniques" (1943)
- "A National Institution: El Colegio Del Uruguay" (1944)

== Personal life ==
Esther Allen married Henry Clinton Gaw in 1910. Their son was Emir Allen Gaw. Henry Gaw died in 1912. She died in 1973, aged 93 years, in Sonoma, California. Biologist Esther Gaw McLaughlin is her granddaughter and namesake.
