= Katherine M. Menendez =

American judge (born 1971)

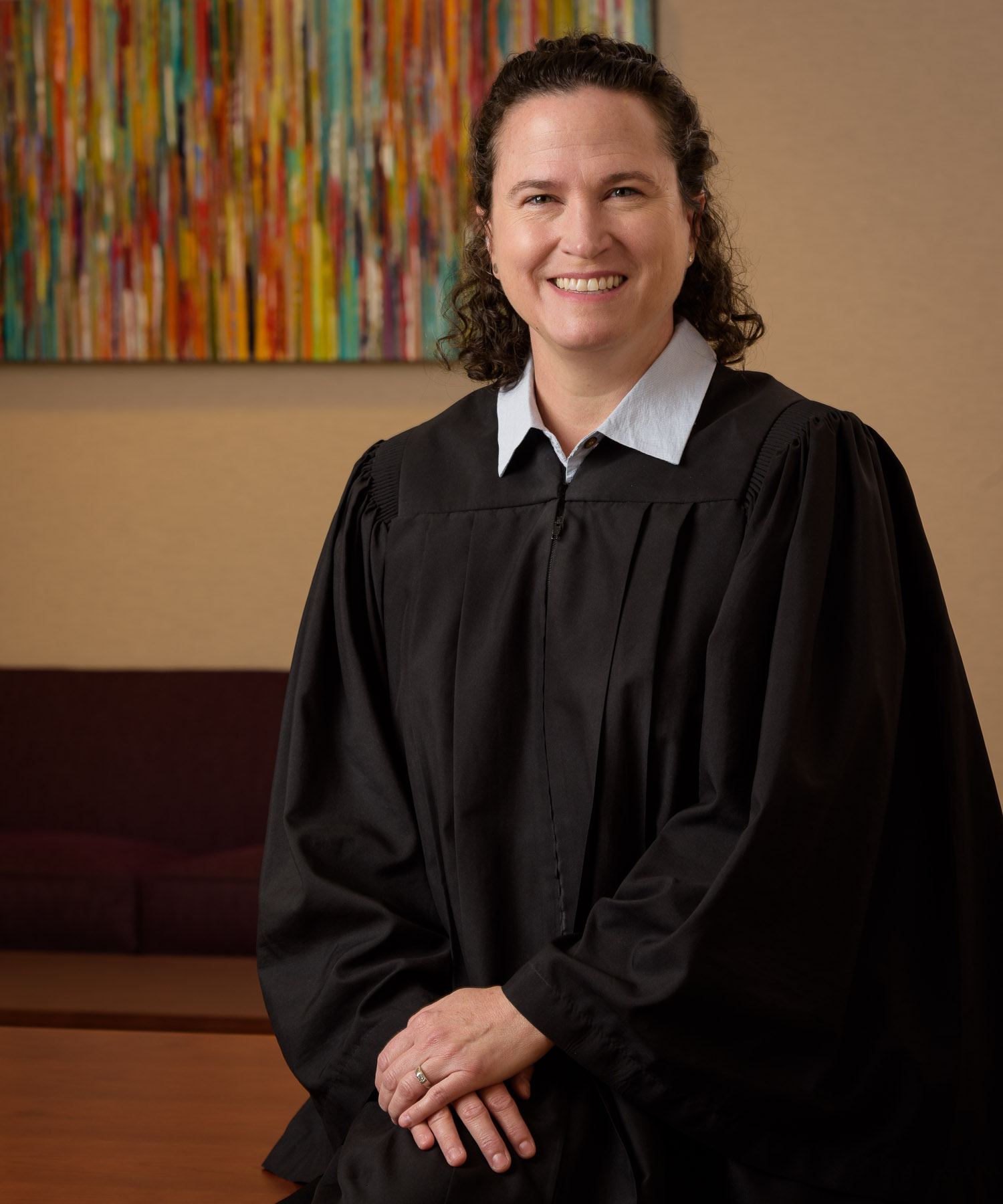

Judge of the United States District Court for the District of Minnesota
- Incumbent
- Assumed office December 21, 2021
- Appointed by: Joe Biden
- Preceded by: Joan N. Ericksen

Magistrate Judge of the United States District Court for the District of Minnesota
- In office April 28, 2016 – December 21, 2021
- Preceded by: Jeffrey J. Keyes
- Succeeded by: Douglas L. Micko

Personal details
- Born: 1971 (age 54–55) Emporia, Kansas, U.S.
- Education: University of Chicago (AB); New York University (JD)

Katherine Marie Menendez (born 1971) is an American attorney serving since 2021 as a United States district judge of the United States District Court for the District of Minnesota. From 2016 to 2021, she served as a magistrate judge of the same court.

== Early life and education ==
Menendez was born in Emporia, Kansas. She earned a Bachelor of Arts degree from the University of Chicago in 1993 and a Juris Doctor degree from New York University in 1997.

== Career ==
From 1996 to 1997, Menendez served as a law clerk for Judge Samuel James Ervin III of the United States Court of Appeals for the Fourth Circuit. She became an assistant federal defender in 1999 and served in the Office of the Federal Public Defender for the District of Minnesota until 2016.

=== United States magistrate judge ===
In March 2016, Menendez was selected as a United States magistrate judge to replace retiring Judge Jeffrey J. Keyes. She was sworn in on April 28. Her service as a magistrate terminated upon her elevation as a district court judge.

=== District court service ===
On September 8, 2021, President Joe Biden announced his intention to nominate Menendez to serve as a United States district judge of the United States District Court for the District of Minnesota. On September 20, her nomination was sent to the Senate. Biden nominated Menendez to the seat vacated by Judge Joan N. Ericksen, who assumed senior status on October 15, 2019. On November 3, 2021, a hearing on her nomination was held before the Senate Judiciary Committee. On December 2, her nomination was reported out of committee by a 15–7 vote. On December 17, the United States Senate invoked cloture on her nomination by a 49–21 vote. On December 18, her nomination was confirmed by a 49–21 vote. She received her judicial commission on December 21, 2021.

=== Notable cases ===
On March 31, 2023, Menendez struck down Minnesota age limits on carrying firearms. On April 24, 2023, following an emergency motion filed by Commissioner of Public Safety Bob Jacobson and various county sheriffs, Menendez granted a stay on the order, effectively putting a pause on the ruling. The Minnesota Attorney General appealed the ruling to the United States Court of Appeals for the Eighth Circuit, and on July 16, 2024, it affirmed her ruling.

On January 26, 2026, Menendez heard oral arguments in a case brought by Minnesota against the United States to curtail ICE operations in the state. The case was heard after Alex Pretti was fatally shot by federal agents on January 24 while protesting ICE activities in Minnesota. While acknowledging their use of racial profiling and excessive force, Menendez ruled that ICE operations may continue at full speed in Minnesota.

Legal offices
| Preceded by Joan N. Ericksen | Judge of the United States District Court for the District of Minnesota; 2021–present | Incumbent |
