= Ben Charles Green =

American judge

Senior Judge of the United States District Court for the Northern District of Ohio
- In office January 5, 1976 – January 12, 1983

Judge of the United States District Court for the Northern District of Ohio
- In office October 5, 1961 – January 5, 1976
- Appointed by: John F. Kennedy
- Preceded by: Seat established by 75 Stat. 80
- Succeeded by: John Michael Manos

Personal details
- Born: Ben Charles Green; January 4, 1905 Cleveland, Ohio
- Died: January 12, 1983 (aged 78)
- Education: Case Western Reserve University (A.B.); Case Western Reserve University School of Law (LL.B.)

Ben Charles Green (January 4, 1905 – January 12, 1983) was a United States district judge of the United States District Court for the Northern District of Ohio.

== Education and career ==
Born in Cleveland, Ohio, the son of Isadore and Rose (Mailman) Green, Green spent one year at Ohio State University before he received an Artium Baccalaureus degree, cum laude, from Western Reserve University (now Case Western Reserve University) in 1928. He received a Bachelor of Laws, Order of the Coif, from Western Reserve University School of Law (now Case Western Reserve University School of Law) in 1930. He was in private practice of law in Cleveland from 1930 to 1933. He was an attorney for the Federal Land Bank in Louisville, Kentucky from 1933 to 1935. He was in private practice of law in Cleveland from 1935 to 1961. He was special counsel to the Ohio Attorney General from 1937 to 1938. He was an attorney and real estate consultant for the City of Cleveland Law Department from 1944 to 1950. He was Chairman of the Cuyahoga County Board of Election from 1950 to 1961. He was special master for the Court of Common Pleas in Cuyahoga County, Ohio from 1959 to 1961.

== Federal judicial service ==
Green received a recess appointment from President John F. Kennedy on October 5, 1961, to the United States District Court for the Northern District of Ohio, to a new seat created by 75 Stat. 80. He was nominated to the same seat by President Kennedy on January 15, 1962. He was confirmed by the United States Senate on June 29, 1962, and received his commission on July 2, 1962. He served on the Judicial Panel on Multidistrict Litigation from 1963 to 1964. He assumed senior status on January 5, 1976. His service was terminated on January 12, 1983, due to his death.

== Honors ==
A visiting professorship at the Case Western Reserve University School of Law was established in Green's memory in 1999; it was expanded to a full professorship by a gift from the Green family. In 2003, the Case Western Reserve Law Library was named in Green's honor.

== Personal ==
Green married Sylvia Elizabeth Chappy on November 20, 1940, and had one daughter.

== Sources ==
- Biography from the United States Court of Appeals for the Sixth Circuit

Legal offices
Preceded by Seat established by 75 Stat. 80	Judge of the United States District Court for the Northern District of Ohio; 1962–1976	Succeeded by John Michael Manos
