= Lesley B. Wells =

American judge (1937–2025)

Lesley Brooks Wells
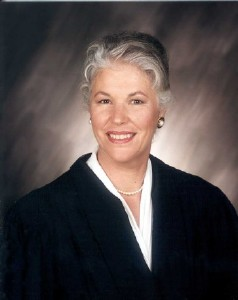

Senior Judge of the United States District Court for the Northern District of Ohio
- In office February 14, 2006 – October 2, 2015

Judge of the United States District Court for the Northern District of Ohio
- In office February 11, 1994 – February 14, 2006
- Appointed by: Bill Clinton
- Preceded by: John Michael Manos
- Succeeded by: Sara Elizabeth Lioi

Personal details
- Born: Lesley Simpson Wells; October 6, 1937 Muskegon, Michigan, U.S.
- Died: August 5, 2025 (aged 87) Cleveland Heights, Ohio, U.S.
- Spouse: Charles F. Clarke (died 2014)
- Children: 4
- Education: Chatham College (BA); Cleveland State University (JD)

Lesley Simpson Brooks Wells (October 6, 1937 – August 5, 2025) was a United States district judge of the United States District Court for the Northern District of Ohio.

== Early life and education ==
Wells was born Lesley Simpson Wells in Muskegon, Michigan. She earned a Bachelor of Arts degree from Chatham College (now Chatham University) in 1959 and a Juris Doctor from the Cleveland State University College of Law in 1974. She was employed as a federal court intern through the Women's Law Fund from 1973 to 1974.

== Career ==
Wells maintained a private law practice for six years (1975–1978 and 1980–1983) in Cleveland, interrupted by two years (1979–1980) as director of the ABAR III Civil Rights Litigation Support Center at the Cleveland State University College of Law. She was adjunct professor at the Cleveland State University College of Law (1980–1981) and adjunct assistant professor, College of Urban Affairs, Cleveland State University (1980–1983 and 1990–1992).

== Judicial service ==
After more than a decade as a Cuyahoga County Court of Common Pleas judge (1983–1994), President Bill Clinton nominated her on November 19, 1993, for a judgeship vacated by John Michael Manos. She was confirmed by the Senate on February 10, 1994, and received her commission the following day. Twelve years later, on February 14, 2006 she became a senior judge. She retired from active service on October 2, 2015.

== Personal life and death ==
Wells was married to the late Charles F. Clarke, a partner in the multinational law firm of Squire, Sanders & Dempsey. The couple had four children. Charles died in January 2014. Lesley Wells died at her home in Cleveland Heights, Ohio, on August 5, 2025, at the age of 87.

Legal offices
Preceded by John Michael Manos	Judge of the United States District Court for the Northern District of Ohio; 1994–2006	Succeeded by Sara Elizabeth Lioi
