= Ann Aldrich =

American judge (1927–2010)

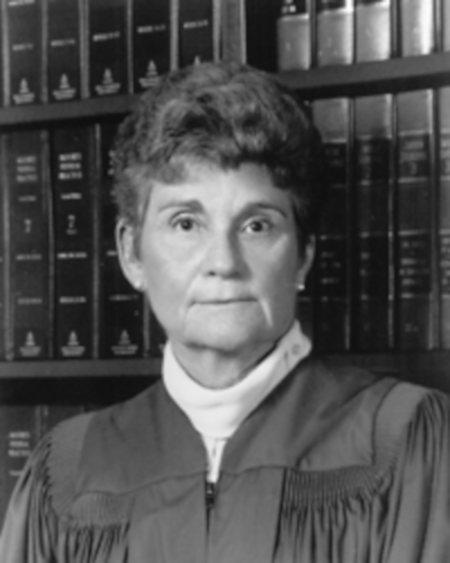

Senior Judge of the United States District Court for the Northern District of Ohio
- In office May 12, 1995 – May 2, 2010

Judge of the United States District Court for the Northern District of Ohio
- In office May 24, 1980 – May 12, 1995
- Appointed by: Jimmy Carter
- Preceded by: Seat established by 92 Stat. 1629
- Succeeded by: Patricia Anne Gaughan

Personal details
- Born: Anna Louise Aldrich; June 28, 1927 Providence, Rhode Island, U.S.
- Died: May 2, 2010 (aged 82) Cleveland, Ohio, U.S.
- Spouses: James Mooney (m. 1948); Chester William Aldrich (m. 1960)
- Children: 4
- Parent(s): Allie Coe and Ethel Mae Aldrich
- Education: Barnard College (BA); New York University School of Law (LLB, LLM, JSD)

Anna Louise "Ann" Aldrich (June 28, 1927 – May 2, 2010) was a United States district judge of the United States District Court for the Northern District of Ohio.

== Youth and Family Life ==
She was born in Providence, Rhode Island on June 28, 1927. Her parents were Allie Coe Aldrich (1885 – 1972) and Ethel May Aldrich (née Carrier) (1888 – 1938). She had one older sister, named Edwina A Greenburg (1922 – 1999).

In 1938, when she was 11 years old, her mother reportedly died in a hurricane.

== Education and career ==
Aldrich received a Bachelor of Arts degree from Barnard College in 1948 and a Bachelor of Laws from the New York University School of Law in 1950. She also attended the Graduate Institute of International Studies in 1951. She was an attorney on the General Counsel's Staff for the International Bank for Reconstruction and Development, in Washington, D.C., from 1951 to 1952. She served as a research assistant for Professor Edmond N. Cahn of the New York University School of Law from 1952 to 1953, and for Arthur T. Vanderbilt of the New Jersey Supreme Court from 1952 to 1953. After a brief stint in private practice in Washington, D.C., she served as a civilian attorney at Subic Bay Naval Station from 1954 to 1956, and as an attorney for the Federal Communications Commission from 1953 to 1960. Aldrich returned to private practice in Darien, Connecticut, from 1961 to 1968. In 1965, she argued for the plaintiff in United Church of Christ v. Federal Communications Commission, which established a private party's standing, before the Federal Communications Commission, to intervene in license renewal proceedings. Aldrich returned to New York University to earn a Master of Laws in 1964 and a Doctor of Juridical Science (a research degree in law equivalent to a Doctor of Philosophy) in 1967. She was a Professor of Law at Cleveland State University from 1968 to 1980.

== Federal judicial service and death ==
Aldrich was nominated to the United States District Court for the Northern District of Ohio by President Jimmy Carter on March 28, 1980, to a new seat created by 92 Stat. 1629. She was confirmed by the United States Senate on May 21, 1980, and received her commission on May 24, 1980. Aldrich was the first woman appointed to the federal district court in Ohio. She assumed senior status on May 12, 1995, but remained active on the court until her death on May 2, 2010, in Cleveland, Ohio.

Prior to her death, she was suffering from "heart, kidney and other problems". She died at the Cleveland Clinic at the age of 82. Despite her health issues, she remained positive prior to her death, often saying "eat, drink and be merry," she continued, "for tomorrow you may actually be alive."

== See also ==
- List of first women lawyers and judges in Ohio

== Sources ==
Legal offices
Preceded by Seat established by 92 Stat. 1629	Judge of the United States District Court for the Northern District of Ohio; 1980–1995	Succeeded by Patricia Anne Gaughan
