= List of first women lawyers and judges in Ohio =

This is a list of the first women lawyer(s) and judge(s) in Ohio. It includes the year in which the women were admitted to practice law (in parentheses). Also included are women who achieved other distinctions such becoming the first in their state to graduate from law school or become a political figure.

== Firsts in Ohio's history ==
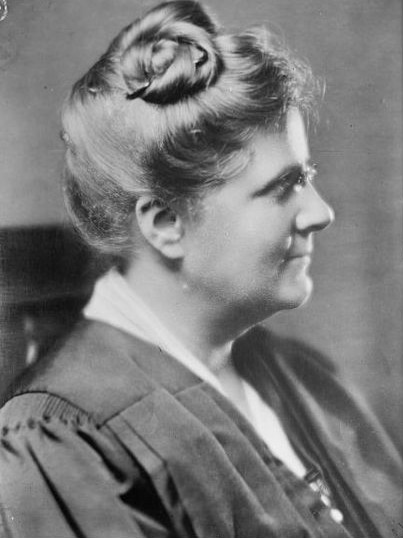
Florence E. Allen: First female Justice of the Ohio Supreme Court (1922)

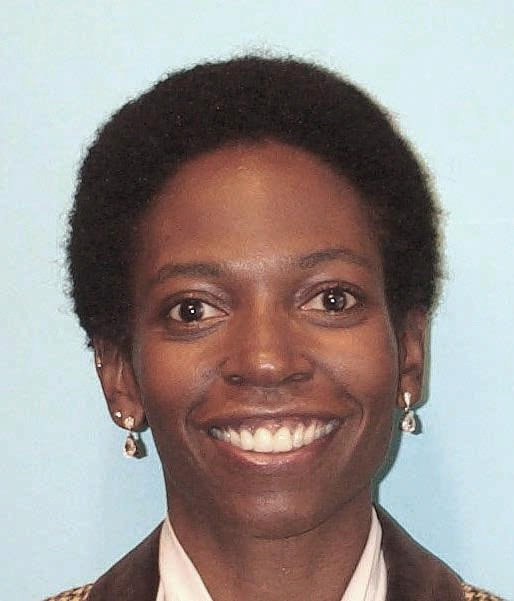
Benita Y. Pearson: First African American female appointed as a Judge of the U.S. District Court for the Northern District of Ohio

=== Law School ===
- First female law graduate: Dora Sandoe Bachman in 1893

=== Lawyers ===
- First female: Nettie Cronise Lutes (1873)
- First African American females: Hazel M. Walker (1919) and Daisy D. Perkins (1919)

=== State judges ===
- First female: Florence E. Allen (1914) in 1920
- First female (Supreme Court of Ohio): Florence E. Allen (1914) in 1922
- First female (municipal court): Mary B. Grossman (1912) in 1923
- First African American female: Lillian W. Burke (1951) in 1969
- First African American female (elected): C. Ellen Connally (1971) in 1979
- First African American female (Ohio Courts of Common Pleas): Stephanie Tubbs Jones in 1983
- First Latino American female: Jazmin Torres-Lugo in 2003
- First openly lesbian female: Mary Wiseman (1998) in 2007
- First Hispanic American (female) (Ohio Court of Appeals; appointed): Keila Cosme in 2009
- First African American female (Supreme Court of Ohio): Yvette McGee Brown in 2011
- First female (Chief Justice; Supreme Court of Ohio): Maureen O'Connor in 2011
- First (Asian American) female (Fourth District Court of Appeals): Marie Hoover (1994) in 2012
- First Egyptian American female: Sherrie Mikhail Miday (2001) in 2016
- First Latino American female (Ohio Court of Appeals; elected): Marilyn Zayas-Davis in 2016
- First African American female (Supreme Court of Ohio): Melody J. Stewart in 2018
- First African American female (Tenth District Court of Appeals): Laurel Beatty Blunt in 2018
- First Hispanic American female (Supreme Court of Ohio; sit-in): Marilyn Zayas-Davis in 2020
- First Muslim American (female): Ajmeri Hoque in 2025

=== Federal judges ===
- First female (U.S. Court of Appeals - Sixth Circuit): Florence E. Allen (1914) in 1934
- First female (federal district court): Ann Aldrich (1950) in 1980
- First female (Magistrate; U.S. District Court for the Northern District of Ohio): Patricia Hemann in 1994
- First African American female (U.S. District Court for the Northern District of Ohio): Benita Y. Pearson (1995)
- First female (Chief Judge; U.S. District Court for the Southern District Court of Ohio): Sandra L. Ammann in 2004
- First African American female (Judge and Chief Judge; United States Bankruptcy Court for the Northern District of Ohio): Jessica E. Price Smith in 2011 and 2024 respectively

=== Attorney General of Ohio ===
- First female: Betty Montgomery from 1995-2003

=== Assistant Attorney General ===
- First African American female: Helen Elsie Austin (1930) in 1937

=== United States Attorney ===
- First African American female (Northern District of Ohio): Marisa T. Darden was confirmed in 2022, though she withdrew before she officially took office

=== Assistant United States Attorney ===
- First female (Northern District of Ohio): Carole S. Rendon

=== County Prosecutor ===
- First African American female: Stephanie Tubbs Jones in 1991

=== Public Defender ===
- First female: Elizabeth Miller in 2023

=== Ohio State Bar Association ===
- First female admitted to bar: Clara Millard (1911)
- First female president: Kathleen Burke from 1993-1994

=== Political Office ===
- First African American female (U.S. House of Representatives): Stephanie Tubbs Jones in 1999

== Firsts in local history ==
- Clam M. Millard: First woman admitted to the Bar in Northwest Ohio [Allen County, et al.]
- Jazmin Torres-Lugo: First Latino American female elected as a judge in Northeast Ohio [Ashland County, et al.]
- Terri Kohlrieser: First female to serve as a Judge of the Common Pleas Court in Allen County, Ohio (2018)
- Toni L. Eddy: First female judge in Chillicothe, Ross County, Ohio
- Megan Bickerton: first female common pleas judge in Columbiana County, Ohio (2018)
- Thelma F. Lowe (1943): First female lawyer in Coshocton, Ohio [Coshocton County, Ohio]
- Mary P. Spargo (1885): First female lawyer in Cleveland, Ohio [Cuyahoga County, Ohio]
- Florence E. Allen (1914): First female to serve as Cuyahoga County's Assistant Prosecuting Attorney
- Edna Smith Shalala: First female of Syrian-Lebanese descent to practice law in Cleveland, Ohio
- Evelyn Lundberg Stratton: First female elected as a Judge of the Franklin County Common Pleas Court in Ohio (1988)
- Katherine (Kay) Lias: First female elected as a Judge of the Franklin County Common Pleas Court, Division of Domestic Relations and Juvenile Branch, Franklin County, Ohio (1988)
- Yvette McGee Brown: First African American female elected to serve as a Judge of the Franklin County Court of Common Pleas
- Kimberly Cocroft: First [African American] female judge ever elected to the administrative judge position in Franklin County, Ohio
- Ajmeri Hoque: First Muslim American (female) judge in Franklin County, Ohio (2025)
- Tracie Hunter: First African American (female) juvenile court judge in Hamilton County, Ohio
- Nee Fong: First Asian American female lawyer in Cincinnati, Ohio [Hamilton County, Ohio]
- Verna Williams: First African American (female) to serve as the Dean of University of Cincinnati College of Law (2017)
- Janaya Trotter Bratton: First African American female to serve as President of the Cincinnati Bar Association (2023)
- Maria Santo: First female judge in the Hardin County Common Pleas Court elected to the newly created Domestic Relations Division (2023)
- Vadae G. Meekison (1907): Reputed to be the first female lawyer in Henry County, Ohio
- Laina Fetherolf: First female prosecutor in Hocking County, Ohio (2008)
- Michelle Miller: First female judge in Jefferson County, Ohio (2014)
- Elaine Mayhew (1949): First female lawyer in Knox County, Ohio. She would later become a judge.
- Addie Nye Norton: First female probate judge in Lake County, Ohio (1920)
- Irene A. Lennon (1930): First female lawyer in Lake County, Ohio. She was also the first female to serve as the President of the Lake County Bar Association in Illinois (1950).
- Francine Bruening: First female elected as the Judge of Common Pleas in Lake County, Ohio (1991)
- Karen Lawson: First female to serve as the Juvenile Court Judge in Lake County, Ohio (2008)
- Christen N. Finley: First female common pleas judge in Lawrence County, Ohio (2018)
- Jennifer L. (Amos) Chesrown: First female judge in Licking County, Ohio
- Maude May Marsh Washburn (1894): First female lawyer in Lorain County, Ohio
- Geraldine Macelwane: First female to serve as a Judge of the Toledo Municipal Court (1952) as well as a Judge of the Lucas County Court of Common Pleas (1956), Ohio
- Carla J. Baldwin: First African American female elected as a judge in Mahoning County, Ohio (2017)
- Julia Bates: First female elected as the Lucas County Prosecutor
- Alice McCollum: First female judge of the Dayton Municipal Court (1979) [Montgomery County, Ohio]
- Barb Gorman: First female to serve as a Judge of the General Division for the Montgomery County Common Pleas Court
- Helen Wallace: First female juvenile judge for Montgomery County, Ohio (2019)
- Janna Woodburn: First native-born female lawyer in Morgan County, Ohio
- Luann Cooperrider (1983): First female judge in Perry County, Ohio. She was also the first female assistant prosecutor in the county's history.
- Blanche Harris: First female to practice before the Portage County courts (1920s)
- Shirley Dubetz (1954): First practicing female attorney in Portage County, Ohio
- Barbara Watson (1980): First female judge in Portage County, Ohio
- Bambi Couch Page: First female prosecutor for Richland County, Ohio (2014)
- Cathy Goldman: First female lawyer in Mansfield, Ohio [Richland County, Ohio]
- Barbara Jo (Steele) Ansted Wilson: First female prosecutor in Sandusky County, Ohio (1985)
- Irene Smart and Sheila Farmer: First female judges in Stark County, Ohio (1978)
- Kani Hightower: First African American (female) to serve as a Domestic Relations Judge in Summit County, Ohio (2022)
- Lulie Mackey: First female lawyer in Trumbull County, Ohio
- Pamela A. Rintala: First female judge of Trumbull County, Ohio (1994)
- Patricia McCants DeBoer (1976): First female lawyer in Newcomerstown, Ohio [Tuscarawas County, Ohio]
- Rachel Hutzel: First female to serve as the Prosecuting Attorney for Warren County, Ohio
- Carol White Millhoan: First female judge in Wayne County, Ohio
- Latecia E. Wiles: First female to serve as a Judge of Wayne County's Probate and Juvenile Court (2013)
- Molly Mack: First female judge in Wood County, Ohio (2014). She is also the first female Wood County Common Pleas Court judge (2019).
- Laina Fetherolf-Rogers: First female judge in Vinton County, Ohio. (December 2024)

== See also ==
- List of first women lawyers and judges in the United States
- Timeline of women lawyers in the United States
- Women in law

== Other topics of interest ==
- List of first minority male lawyers and judges in the United States
- List of first minority male lawyers and judges in Ohio
