= Florence E. Allen =

American judge (1884–1966)

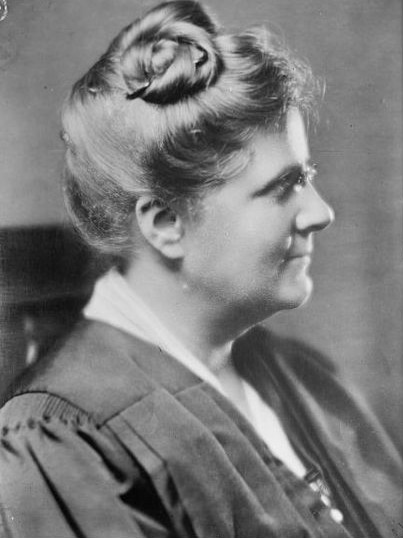

Senior Judge of the United States Court of Appeals for the Sixth Circuit
- In office October 5, 1959 – September 12, 1966

Chief Judge of the United States Court of Appeals for the Sixth Circuit
- In office September 18, 1958 – October 5, 1959
- Preceded by: Charles Casper Simons
- Succeeded by: John Donelson Martin Sr.

Judge of the United States Court of Appeals for the Sixth Circuit
- In office March 21, 1934 – October 5, 1959
- Appointed by: Franklin D. Roosevelt
- Preceded by: Smith Hickenlooper
- Succeeded by: Paul Charles Weick

Associate Justice of the Ohio Supreme Court
- In office January 1, 1923 – March 21, 1934
- Preceded by: Benson W. Hough
- Succeeded by: Robert Nugen Wilkin

Personal details
- Born: Florence Ellinwood Allen; March 23, 1884 Salt Lake City, Utah, U.S.
- Died: September 12, 1966 (aged 82) Mentor, Ohio, U.S.
- Party: Democratic
- Relatives: Clarence Emir Allen (father); Esther Allen Gaw (sister); Bryant Tuckerman (cousin)
- Education: Case Western Reserve University (BA, MA); University of Chicago; New York University (LLB)
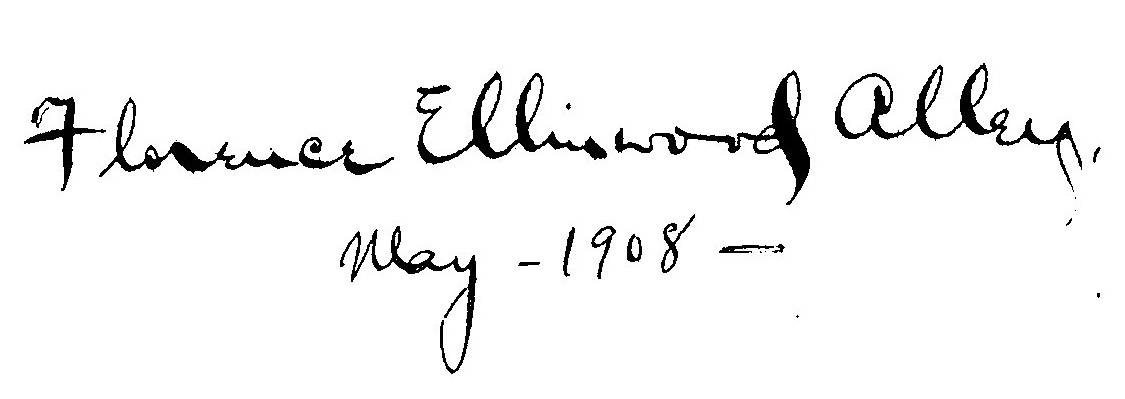
- Signature

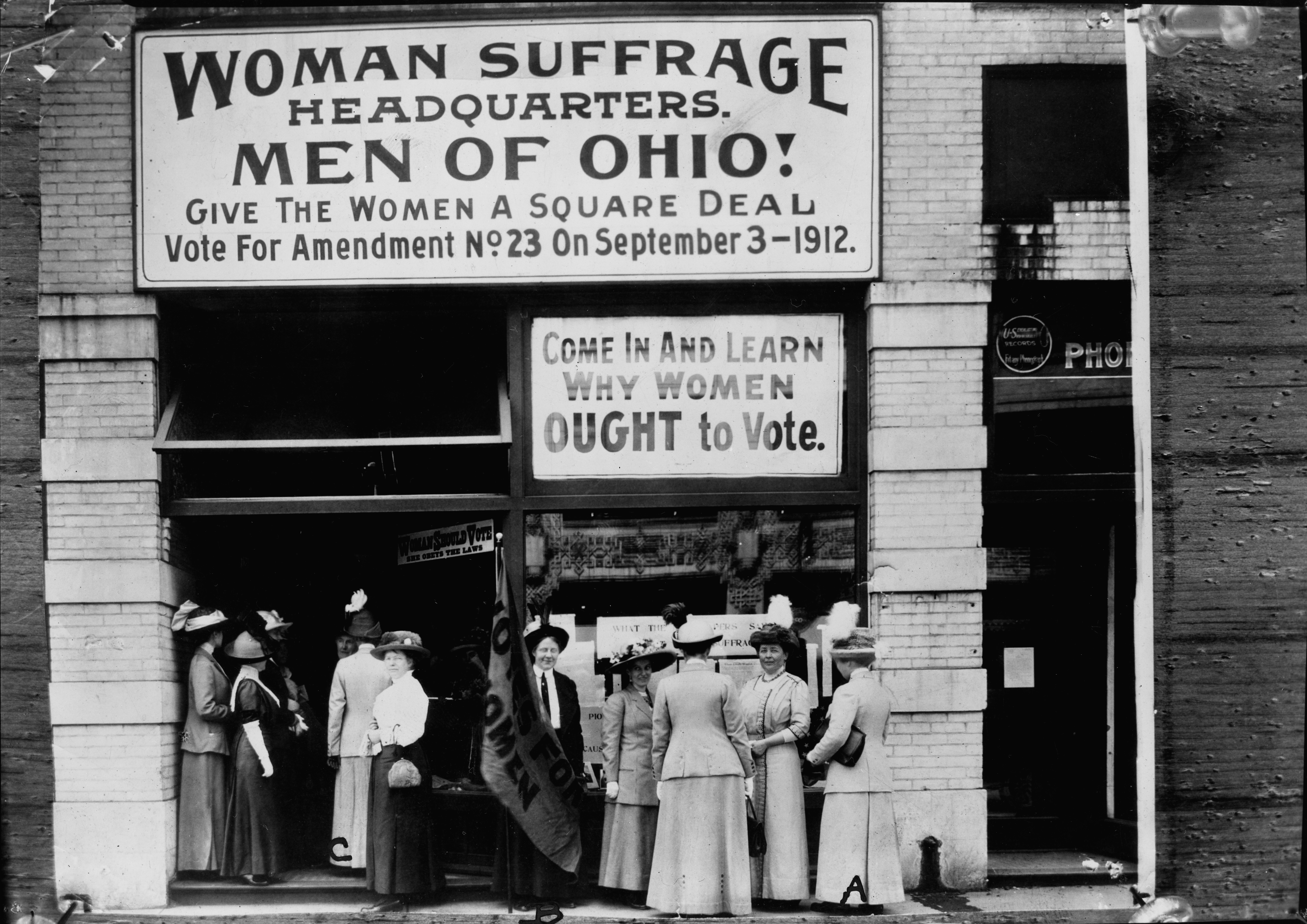
Belle Sherwin and Florence Ellinwood Allen at Woman suffrage headquarters, Upper Euclid Avenue, Cleveland, 1912

Florence Ellinwood Allen (March 23, 1884 – September 12, 1966) was a United States federal judge on the United States Court of Appeals for the Sixth Circuit from 1934-1959. Allen served on the Supreme Court of Ohio from 1922 until 1934. She was the first woman to serve on a state supreme court, and the first woman to serve as an Article III United States federal judge. In 2005, she was inducted into the National Women's Hall of Fame.

== Early life and education ==
Florence E. Allen was born on March 23, 1884, in Salt Lake City, Utah, the daughter of Clarence Emir Allen Sr., a mine manager and later a United States Representative from Utah, and his wife Corinne Marie, née Tuckerman. She was one of seven children—five girls, one of whom died in infancy, and two boys. Her family valued community activism and education. Allen's father, a professor and linguist, moved the family from Salt Lake City, Utah to Cleveland, Ohio to teach at Western Reserve University, now known as Case Western Reserve University.

Florence Allen grew up in Cleveland, Ohio. Her father taught her Greek and Latin as a child. Allen also studied music and poetry growing up. Allen attended the New Lyme Institute in Ashtabula, Ohio. Afterwards, Allen attended Western Reserve, now Case Western Reserve University, majoring in music. Allen graduated in 1904 with a Bachelor of Arts degree. Her father then sent her to Berlin to continue her musical studies. While in Berlin, she worked as a correspondent for a New York magazine called the Musical Courier. Her original plan was to become a concert pianist, but she sustained an injury that cut her music career short. She returned to Ohio in 1906 and took a job in Cleveland, Ohio as the music critic for The Plain Dealer newspaper until 1909.

By this time, Allen had an increasing interest in politics and law which led her to pursue a Master of Arts degree in political science from Western Reserve, now Case Western Reserve University. She completed her Master of Arts degree in 1908. She took courses in constitutional law, but at that time, Western Reserve's law school did not admit women so she was unable to pursue a law degree. Determined to have a legal career, Allen took special classes and tutorials. She attended law school at the University of Chicago for a year and then transferred to New York University School of Law. To pay her tuition, she worked as a legal investigator and researcher for the New York League for the Protection of Immigrants. In 1913, she received her Bachelor of Laws degree graduating with honors. She returned to Cleveland, Ohio, and Allen was admitted to the Ohio bar in 1914.

== Legal career ==
By her own admission, she was not a success at first. She only made about $25 during her first month, and all she could afford for her office was two chairs and a borrowed typewriter. As she told a reporter in a 1934 interview, "I had no clients. And I had no money. But I had great hopes." However, in order to become successful, what she needed was some experience, so she did volunteer work with the local Legal Aid Society of Cleveland, where she not only got that experience but got involved with an important case about suffrage.

As a child, her mother had taken her to see famous suffragists Susan B. Anthony and Anna Howard Shaw giving talks about women's rights. And the belief that women should be treated as equals under the law undoubtedly resonated with her even more as a result of her struggles to be taken seriously as an attorney. She became even more interested in politics, and more committed to the cause of women's suffrage. She was active in the Women's Suffrage Party and began challenging local laws that limited women's participation in the political process. And she argued one particular case that went all the way to the Ohio Supreme Court: thanks to her efforts, she won the women of East Cleveland the right to vote in municipal elections. During this time, she also became involved in another cause, one that would be important to her all of her life: disarmament and the quest for world peace. For Allen, this was personal: both of her brothers died while serving their country during the First World War.

== State judicial service ==
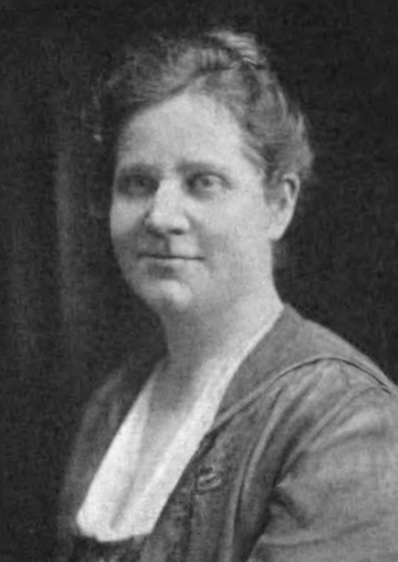
1919

Once she won a few cases and gained the respect of her male colleagues, her career flourished. In 1919, she was appointed the assistant prosecuting attorney for Cleveland's Cuyahoga County. An active Democrat, she nevertheless encountered opposition from Democratic party chairman Burr Gongwer. However, the appointment was approved and she became the first woman in Ohio to hold such a position. She then began bringing cases before the grand jury. She also continued to advocate women's rights, even giving talks about her devotion to the Democratic party and the political process.

By 1920, Allen won election as a Court of Common Pleas judge on a non-partisan ticket. She was the first woman in this position. Allen resisted her colleagues' efforts to assign her to a special divorce division within the court. Instead, Allen insisted on hearing the court's full range of cases under its jurisdiction, and during her time on the bench she tried nearly 900 cases. Undoubtedly, her biggest challenge was a case involving gangster Frank Motto, who was convicted of the murder of two men during a robbery. With women on the jury and a woman judge, legal critics wondered whether the stereotype about women being emotional, and thus lenient, would come into play, but it did not. Motto was convicted, and in mid-May 1921, Allen sentenced Motto to the electric chair.

In November 1922, Allen became the first women to reach a state high court bench when she was elected to the Ohio Supreme Court. While most celebrated Allen's election, a former Ohio mayor spoke publicly on his doubt concerning Allen's eligibility to serve on the bench. Allen immediately told reporters that she intended to keep partisan politics out of the judiciary.

In 1928, Allen was re-elected to a second six-year term on the Ohio Supreme Court. All of the winners in that election were Republicans except for her. She continued to be a popular figure in Ohio, honored by numerous civic groups for her fair-mindedness; and lawyers who came before her praised her willingness to listen. And while she was not afraid to make the difficult decisions, even on death penalty cases, Allen was not just a "law and order" judge.

She was also a mentor, who encouraged young women to become lawyers. She continued to give educational talks about the law, and she worked tirelessly to improve women's legal rights. She was a proponent of jury service for women, at a time when many states still did not allow women to serve, and she continued to encourage women to be politically active even while remaining non-partisan herself. By 1930, her reputation was so positive that some newspapers were suggesting that she be nominated for a seat on the United States Supreme Court. Among them was the Christian Science Monitor, which praised Allen for her "distinguished achievements" as a jurist.

A pacifist, Allen was an opponent of war and argued that the only way to avoid war was to outlaw it. War must be made outlawed and declared a crime, she said. She also called for the establishment of an international court that has jurisdiction over purely international disputes and that international law should be codified on the basis of equity and right.

== Federal judicial service ==
President Franklin D. Roosevelt nominated Allen on March 6, 1934, to a seat on the United States Court of Appeals for the Sixth Circuit vacated by Judge Smith Hickenlooper. Among the local bench and bar, opinions about the suitability of her appointment were divided. The FBI reported that "[s]ome members of Cleveland Bar favor her appointment alleging able, fair, independent, conscientious, judicious, legal mind and well qualified in every respect." However, other attorneys and sitting male judges vigorously opposed Allen’s appointment, telling FBI background investigators that she was as a woman she was "naturally unqualified" and its report reflects that sentiment. These attorneys and judges protested that appointing a woman would lower their standards and make them a laughingstock.

She was confirmed by the United States Senate on March 15, 1934, and received her commission on March 21, 1934. She was the second woman to serve in the federal judiciary and the first woman to serve as an Article III federal judge. Genevieve R. Cline was earlier appointed to serve as an Article I federal judge on the United States Customs Court. Allen's nomination to the prestigious position received widespread praise. Newspaper articles described Allen as "an able jurist" and a "profound student" of the law. Allen served on the federal bench for twenty-five years, serving her last year as the first woman Chief Justice from 1958 to 1959. She was a member of the Judicial Conference of the United States in 1958. She assumed senior status on October 5, 1959. Her service terminated with her death on September 12, 1966.

== Women's rights advocacy and pacifism ==
Allen continued her ongoing advocacy of women's rights. She was a member of the National Association of Business and Professional Women, and spoke at several of their conventions, and was a member of the National Association of Women Lawyers. Allen continued to advocate an end to wars. In 1935, she was one of ten "outstanding American women", with Eleanor Roosevelt and feminist leader Carrie Chapman Catt, to contribute to Why Wars Must Cease. In her essay, Allen asserted that wars "unleash demoralizing instincts" such as "callousness, cynicism, and greed." She said they also contribute to numerous social problems, including the break-up of families, and increases in crime.

== Supreme Court speculation ==
The press continued to speculate on Allen as a possible Supreme Court nominee. In early 1939, when Supreme Court Justice Louis D. Brandeis was about to retire, some of Allen's supporters tried to persuade President Roosevelt that it was time to name a woman, and they reminded the president that Allen was extremely qualified. Chief among advocates on her behalf was Lillian D. Rock, former vice president of the National Association of Women Lawyers and chair of a newly created committee whose purpose was to encourage the appointment of more women to important positions in government. Allen was not named to the Supreme Court, however, and it was another male judge, William O. Douglas, who replaced Justice Brandeis. For the next few years, every time a vacancy occurred, Allen's supporters would again suggest her, but to no avail.

== Continued advocacy ==
On the Circuit Court, Sixth Circuit, she heard cases from Ohio, Michigan, Kentucky, and Tennessee. In 1940, she wrote This Constitution of Ours. Even after World War II broke out, Allen remained steadfast in her determination to work for peace. She continued speaking and gave talks both in person and on radio. In 1944, the National Association of Women lawyers put her name forth as someone who should be involved in international peace negotiations. When the war ended, she continued to speak to civic groups, especially women's clubs. Her message was that relying on the United Nations would not prevent the next war. It was essential for individual citizens to keep demanding that each country—whether large or small—have respect for the rule of law. "To secure peace, there must be justice," she told 3,000 attendees at a conference of the National Federation of Business and Professional Women's Clubs. "There cannot be justice unless there is a rebirth of moral principle among the nations. There cannot be a rebirth of moral principle unless the conscience of the peoples becomes articulate."

Allen herself remained a very articulate spokeswoman on the issues she cared about. She was regarded as such a credible figure that in 1947, the American Academy of Political and Social Science asked her to do a study of women's voting patterns, to offer her assessment of whether women were in fact using the franchise, and whether they were active in the political process. In later talks, Allen expressed the opinion that while many women were in fact voting and speaking out on issues, there was a generational shift taking place. The dynamic women leaders who had fought for suffrage and brought about greater participation for women in other areas of public life were now deceased, and they had not yet been replaced. She expressed concern about this lack of new and dynamic leadership, and hoped new leaders would emerge.

== Renewed Supreme Court speculation ==
Allen's supporters again sought to have her appointed to the United States Supreme Court during Harry S. Truman's presidency, but Truman seemed to be opposed to having a woman sitting on the highest court of the land. Allen was later told that Truman's reluctance to appoint her had to do with his belief that having a woman around would make the male judges uncomfortable. "They say they couldn't sit around with their robes off and their feet up and discuss the problems." Truman's reluctance to appoint a woman extended to other venues. When there were more than 20 Federal court vacancies, his original list of nominees was all male; only after some influential women politicians protested, the president named one woman, Burnita Shelton Matthews, to the bench of the U.S. District Court for the District of Columbia in 1949. After her retirement, she continued to do speaking engagements and began working on her autobiography. It was called To Do Justly, and was published in the autumn of 1965.

== Death ==
In declining health after falling and breaking her hip, Allen died on September 12, 1966, in Waite Hill, Ohio, where she had been living with a distant cousin since her retirement.

== Honor ==
In 2005, Allen was inducted into the National Women's Hall of Fame.

== See also ==
- List of female state supreme court justices
- List of first women lawyers and judges in the United States
- List of first women lawyers and judges in Ohio

Legal offices
| Preceded by Benson W. Hough | Associate Justice of the Ohio Supreme Court; 1923–1934 | Succeeded by Robert Nugen Wilkin |
| Preceded by Smith Hickenlooper | Judge of the United States Court of Appeals for the Sixth Circuit; 1934–1959 | Succeeded by Paul Charles Weick |
| Preceded by Charles Casper Simons | Chief Judge of the United States Court of Appeals for the Sixth Circuit; 1958–1959 | Succeeded by John Donelson Martin Sr. |
