= Rosemary M. Collyer =

American judge (1945–2026)

Rosemary Collyer
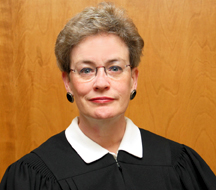

Chief Judge of the Alien Terrorist Removal Court
- In office 2016–2020
- Preceded by: James C. Cacheris
- Succeeded by: James Boasberg

Judge of the Alien Terrorist Removal Court
- In office 2016–2020
- Preceded by: James C. Cacheris
- Succeeded by: James Boasberg

Presiding Judge of the United States Foreign Intelligence Surveillance Court
- In office May 19, 2016 – December 31, 2019
- Preceded by: Thomas F. Hogan
- Succeeded by: James Boasberg

Judge of the United States Foreign Intelligence Surveillance Court
- In office March 8, 2013 – March 7, 2020
- Preceded by: John D. Bates
- Succeeded by: Anthony Trenga

Senior Judge of the United States District Court for the District of Columbia
- In office May 18, 2016 – June 7, 2026

Judge of the United States District Court for the District of Columbia
- In office November 15, 2002 – May 18, 2016
- Appointed by: George W. Bush
- Preceded by: Thomas Penfield Jackson
- Succeeded by: Timothy J. Kelly

Personal details
- Born: Rosemary Elizabeth Mayers; November 19, 1945 Port Chester, New York, U.S.
- Died: June 7, 2026 (aged 80) Rockville, Maryland, U.S.
- Spouse: Philip Collyer
- Children: 1
- Education: Trinity Washington University (BA); University of Denver (JD)

Rosemary Elizabeth Mayers Collyer (November 19, 1945 – June 7, 2026) was an American jurist who served as a United States district judge of the United States District Court for the District of Columbia, and as a judge of the United States Foreign Intelligence Surveillance Court.

== Early life and career ==
Born Rosemary Elizabeth Mayers on November 19, 1945, in Port Chester, New York, Collyer grew up in Stamford, Connecticut, where her father, Thomas, was the mayor from 1963 to 1967. She received a Bachelor of Arts degree from Trinity College (later Trinity Washington University) in 1968 and a Juris Doctor from the University of Denver College of Law in 1977.

Collyer was in private practice at the law firm of Sherman & Howard in Colorado from 1977 to 1981. She was then chairman of the Federal Mine Safety and Health Review Commission from 1981 to 1984 and general counsel of the National Labor Relations Board from 1984 to 1989. She returned to private practice in Washington, D.C., as a partner in the firm of Crowell & Moring from 1989 to 2002. She was the first woman to serve as the chair of the Federal Mine Safety and Health Commission, as the general counsel of the National Labor Relations Board, and as the elected chair of a major D.C.-based firm.

== Judicial service ==
On August 1, 2002, Collyer was nominated by President George W. Bush to the seat on the United States District Court for the District of Columbia vacated by Thomas Penfield Jackson. Collyer was confirmed by the United States Senate on November 14, 2002, and received her commission on November 15, 2002. She assumed senior status on May 18, 2016.

In 2013, Collyer was appointed by the Chief Justice of the United States to a seven-year term on the Foreign Intelligence Surveillance Court. Judge Collyer's term on the FISC began on March 8, 2013, and was set to conclude on March 7, 2020. She replaced Judge John D. Bates, whose term ended on February 21, 2013. On December 20, 2019, she announced she would step down early as the presiding judge of the FISC for health reasons.

=== Notable cases ===
Judge Collyer presided over a number of habeas corpus petitions submitted on behalf of Guantanamo captives.

In United States House of Representatives v. Price (2016), Collyer first found the House had standing to sue the Obama administration and, then, found that the administration had unconstitutionally spent billions of Treasury funds on health insurer subsidies without congressional appropriation. She enjoined any further insurer reimbursements without a valid appropriation but stayed her order pending appeal.

Collyer was one of four FISA Court judges who approved a FISA warrant (issued in October 2016 and renewed several times) authorizing the wiretapping of Carter Page, a Trump campaign aide the FBI believed was conspiring with Russia to interfere with the 2016 U.S. elections. In December 2019, Collyer issued an order saying the FBI "provided false information to the National Security Division (NSD) of the Department of Justice, and withheld material information from NSD which was detrimental to the FBI's case, in connection with four applications to the Foreign Intelligence Surveillance Court (FISC) for authority to conduct electronic surveillance of a U.S. citizen named Carter W. Page", ordering the government to inform the court of planned procedures to "ensure that the statement of facts in each FBI application accurately and completely reflects information possessed by the FBI that is material to any issue presented by the application."

== Later life and death ==
Collyer stopped hearing cases in 2020. She died from ovarian cancer at a nursing home in Rockville, Maryland, on June 7, 2026, at the age of 80.

Legal offices
Preceded by Thomas Penfield Jackson	Judge of the United States District Court for the District of Columbia; 2002–2016	Succeeded by Timothy J. Kelly
Preceded by John D. Bates	Judge of the United States Foreign Intelligence Surveillance Court; 2013–2020	Succeeded by Anthony Trenga
Preceded by Thomas F. Hogan	Presiding Judge of the United States Foreign Intelligence Surveillance Court; 2016–2019	Succeeded by James Boasberg
