= Solomon Oliver Jr. =

American judge (born 1947)

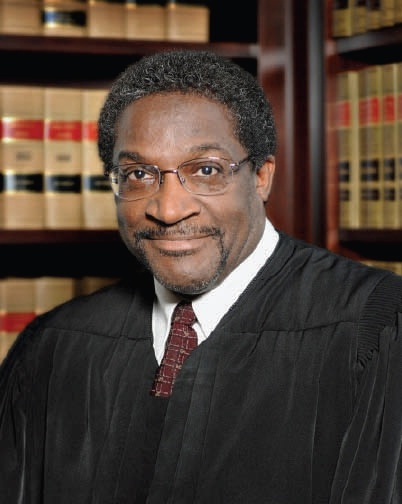

Senior Judge of the United States District Court for the Northern District of Ohio
- Incumbent
- Assumed office February 15, 2021

Chief Judge of the United States District Court for the Northern District of Ohio
- In office 2010 – May 31, 2017
- Preceded by: James G. Carr
- Succeeded by: Patricia Anne Gaughan

Judge of the United States District Court for the Northern District of Ohio
- In office May 9, 1994 – February 15, 2021
- Appointed by: Bill Clinton
- Preceded by: Alice M. Batchelder
- Succeeded by: David A. Ruiz

Personal details
- Born: July 20, 1947 (age 79) Bessemer, Alabama, U.S.
- Education: College of Wooster (BA); New York University (JD); Case Western Reserve University (MA)

Solomon Oliver Jr. (born July 20, 1947) is a senior United States district judge of the United States District Court for the Northern District of Ohio.

== Education and career ==
Born in Bessemer, Alabama, Oliver received a Bachelor of Arts degree from College of Wooster in 1969 and a Juris Doctor from New York University School of Law in 1972. He earned a Master of Arts in political science from Case Western Reserve University in 1974. From 1972 to 1975, he was an assistant professor of political science at the College of Wooster. Oliver then clerked for Judge William H. Hastie of the United States Court of Appeals for the Third Circuit from 1975 to 1976. Following his clerkship, he worked as an Assistant United States Attorney for the Northern District of Ohio, becoming chief of the civil division in 1978. In 1982, he was named the chief of the appellate division. He left the Department of Justice in 1982 to become a professor of law at Cleveland Marshall College of Law, where he taught and published in the areas of civil procedure, federal jurisdiction and trial advocacy. From 1991 to 1994 he served as associate dean for faculty and administration.

=== Federal judicial service ===
On March 9, 1994, President Bill Clinton nominated Oliver to a seat on the United States District Court for the Northern District of Ohio vacated by Alice M. Batchelder. He was confirmed by the United States Senate on May 6, 1994, and received his commission on May 9, 1994. Oliver served as Chief Judge from 2010 to 2017. He assumed senior status on February 15, 2021. In describing Oliver's public service, U.S. Senator Sherrod Brown said, "Judge Oliver served our nation honorably and helped make the city of Cleveland a fairer, more just place to live."

== See also ==
- List of African-American federal judges
- List of African-American jurists

Legal offices
Preceded by Alice M. Batchelder	Judge of the United States District Court for the Northern District of Ohio; 1994–2021	Succeeded by David A. Ruiz
Preceded by James G. Carr	Chief Judge of the United States District Court for the Northern District of Ohio; 2010–2017	Succeeded by Patricia Anne Gaughan
