= Sherrie Mikhail Miday =

American judge

Sherrie Miday

Judge, Cuyahoga County Ohio Courts of Common Pleas General Division
- In office January 2017 – January 4, 2029
- Preceded by: Pamela A. Barker

Personal details
- Born: October 12, 1976 (age 49) Cleveland, Ohio, US
- Party: Democratic
- Education: John Carroll University (B.A., 1998); Case Western Reserve University School of Law (J.D., 2001)

Sherrie Mikhail Miday (born 12 October 1976 in Cleveland, Ohio) is an American judge and the first Egyptian-American elected judge in the history of the United States. A native of Cleveland, she serves as a judge for the Cuyahoga County Court of Common Pleas General Division in Ohio, where she was first elected on November 8, 2016. Her current term ends on January 4, 2029. As a Common Pleas judge, Miday handles both general civil cases and felony criminal cases. Since taking the bench, she has become recognized for her work in domestic violence cases, serving as Chairperson of the Cuyahoga County Domestic Violence Taskforce and presiding over the High-Risk Domestic Violence Court, which she helped establish with a $1 million federal grant in 2019. Prior to her judicial career, Miday practiced law in employment and labor law, foreclosure litigation, and creditor's rights, and served as an assistant prosecutor specializing in domestic violence cases.

== Early life ==
Sherrie was born in Cleveland two years after her parents, one of whom is a Coptic Orthodox Christian priest, immigrated to the United States from Cairo, Egypt in 1975. As a first-generation American, she was taught to value the freedoms and protections guaranteed to the citizens of the United States by the rule of law. Her parents believed that education was paramount to their children's future and provided equal educational opportunities to all their children regardless of gender.

== Education ==
In 1998 Miday graduated from John Carroll University. In 2001 she received her J.D. from Case Western Reserve University.

== Career ==
She worked as a lawyer at the Cleveland office for six years to meet the requirements for running for a judgeship. She then worked for three years as a prosecutor and three years as an assistant judge.

Prior to her judicial role, Miday practiced law with the firms of Duvin, Cahn & Hutton; Lerner, Sampson & Rothfuss; and Manley Deas Kochalski, LLC, specializing in employment and labor law, foreclosure litigation, and creditor's rights law. She previously served as an assistant prosecutor for the City of Cleveland, specializing in domestic violence prosecution, and as a staff attorney for the Cuyahoga County Court of Common Pleas.

== Judicial service ==
As a Common Pleas judge, Miday is responsible for both general civil cases and felony criminal cases. Since ascending to the bench, she has served as Chairperson of the Cuyahoga County Domestic Violence Taskforce and has been a co-editor of the Baldwin's Ohio Handbook Series: Ohio Domestic Violence Law since 2018. In October 2019, Miday was successful in securing a $1 million grant from the U.S. Department of Justice, Bureau of Justice Assistance Innovations in Supervision Initiatives, to establish a High-Risk Domestic Violence Court in Cuyahoga County.

In 2020, Miday was appointed to preside over the Cuyahoga County High-Risk Domestic Violence Court. The High-Risk Domestic Violence Court is a specialty docket of the Common Pleas Court with a mission to reduce the risk of violence and homicide in high-risk cases of intimate partner violence. Judge Miday leads a specially-trained, multi-disciplinary team of justice system professionals who work collaboratively to improve victim safety by providing resources for victims and intense monitoring and behavioral interventions for offenders.

Miday has developed a high-risk domestic violence docket in which she addresses issues of intimate partner violence, works with offenders to change behaviors and identify the origins of violence, and provides victims of domestic violence with resources and treatment necessary for healthy relationships.

== Campaigns ==
=== 2022 ===
In 2022, Miday ran for re-election to her seat on the Cuyahoga County Court of Common Pleas General Division. She was unopposed in the Democratic primary on May 3, 2022, receiving 58,088 votes. In the general election held on November 8, 2022, she ran as a nonpartisan candidate and again faced no opposition. She secured 100% of the vote with 200,601 ballots cast in her favor.

Miday's re-election campaign occurred alongside her continued implementation of specialized judicial initiatives, most notably the High-Risk Domestic Violence Court, which aims to provide intensive monitoring of high-risk offenders and increased support for survivors. Her current six-year term commenced on January 5, 2023, and is scheduled to conclude on January 4, 2029.

==== General Election ====
Candidate	Vote %	Votes
Sherrie Miday (Nonpartisan)	100.0%	200,601

==== Democratic Primary ====
Candidate	Vote %	Votes
Sherrie Miday	100.0%	58,088

=== 2016 ===
In 2016, Miday sought election to the Cuyahoga County Court of Common Pleas General Division. After running unopposed in the Democratic primary on March 15, 2016, she faced Matthew McMonagle in the general election. Miday defeated McMonagle on November 8, 2016, receiving 206,986 votes (54.07%) to his 175,846 votes (45.93%).

With this victory, Miday became the first Egyptian-American elected as a judge in United States history, marking a significant milestone in judicial representation and diversity. Her campaign was noted for its focus on her experience as a domestic violence prosecutor and her platform of judicial efficiency. However, the race was also marked by xenophobic attacks and inflammatory rhetoric regarding her heritage and faith during the election cycle. Her win followed a narrow defeat in 2014, a transition she attributed to increased community outreach and a growing desire for diversity on the bench among Cuyahoga County voters.

==== General Election ====
Candidate	Vote %	Votes
Sherrie Miday	54.07%	206,986
Matthew McMonagle	45.93%	175,846

==== Democratic Primary ====
Candidate	Vote %	Votes
Sherrie Miday (unopposed)	100.00%	99,460

=== 2014 ===
In 2014, Miday ran for a seat on the Cuyahoga County Court of Common Pleas, becoming the first Egyptian-American to seek a judgeship in the county. She was defeated in the general election on November 4, 2014, by incumbent Judge Pamela A. Barker, receiving 47.1% of the vote.

The campaign was marked by what Miday described as "challenges based on her ethnicity," noting that "people are afraid sometimes of the unknown, and we're not a very large community in Cuyahoga County." During the race, Miday was the target of xenophobic rhetoric, including false allegations that she would attempt to implement Sharia law from the bench. These claims were noted by observers as lacking a factual basis as Miday is a Coptic Orthodox Christian, a faith with no theological or legal connection to Sharia law. Furthermore, under the U.S. Constitution and the Ohio Code of Judicial Conduct, all judges are required to swear an oath to uphold the Constitution and state law, which prohibits the application of personal religious codes in place of established law.

Additionally, some of Miday's Arab-American supporters were falsely linked to extremist organizations in campaign materials. Miday later reflected that the experience served to strengthen her support within the local immigrant and minority communities, who responded to the rhetoric by increasing their advocacy for her candidacy.

==== General Election ====
Candidate	Vote %
Pamela A. Barker (Incumbent)	52.9%
Sherrie Miday	47.1%

== See also ==
- List of first women lawyers and judges in the United States
- List of first women lawyers and judges in Ohio
