= John Michael Manos =

American judge (1922–2006)

John M. Manos
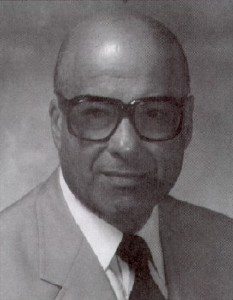

Senior Judge of the United States District Court for the Northern District of Ohio
- In office April 1, 1991 – July 6, 2006

Judge of the United States District Court for the Northern District of Ohio
- In office March 29, 1976 – April 1, 1991
- Appointed by: Gerald Ford
- Preceded by: Ben Charles Green
- Succeeded by: Lesley B. Wells

Personal details
- Born: John Michael Manos; December 8, 1922 Cleveland, Ohio
- Died: July 6, 2006 (aged 83) Lakewood, Ohio
- Party: Republican
- Education: Case Institute of Technology (BS); Cleveland State University (JD)

John Michael Manos (December 8, 1922 – July 6, 2006) was a United States district judge of the United States District Court for the Northern District of Ohio.

== Early life and education ==
Manos was born to Maria and Michael E. Manos on December 8, 1922, in Cleveland, Ohio. He grew up in the Tremont neighborhood of Cleveland. Like many Depression-era Cleveland kids, he worked odd jobs at the West Side Market. He attended Cleveland Public Schools and graduated from Lincoln High School. He went on to Case Institute of Technology (now Case Western Reserve University), where he was quarterback and captain of the football team. He graduated from Case in 1944 with a Bachelor of Science degree in Metallurgy. He was in the United States Navy from 1943 to 1945. Once he returned, he attended Cleveland Law School, which would be renamed Cleveland–Marshall College of Law. During this time, Manos worked as assistant plant manager at the Lake City Malleable Iron Company. He was a member of Delta Theta Phi and Phi Alpha Delta Law Fraternities. He received a Juris Doctor in 1950.

== Legal and state judicial service ==
Manos was in private practice in Cleveland from 1950 to 1963. He was law director of the City of Bay Village, Ohio from 1954 to 1956. He was industries representative of the Cleveland Regional Board of Review from 1956 to 1959. He was Judge of the Cuyahoga County Court of Common Pleas from 1963 to 1969. He was a Judge of the Cuyahoga County Court of Appeals from 1969 to 1976.

== Federal judicial service ==
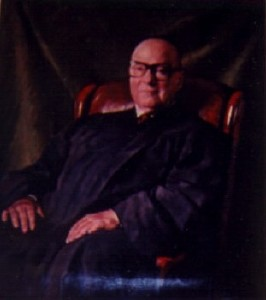
Manos's court portrait by Ruth Nester, 2001.

Manos was nominated by President Gerald Ford on March 17, 1976, to a seat on the United States District Court for the Northern District of Ohio vacated by Judge Ben Charles Green. He was confirmed by the United States Senate on March 26, 1976, and received his commission on March 29, 1976. Manos assumed senior status on April 1, 1991. He served in that status until his death on July 6, 2006, in Lakewood, Ohio.

== Notable cases ==
In 1981, Manos ruled that oil company Mobil's $6.5 billion offer to acquire Marathon Oil would violate federal antitrust laws. Manos made another landmark ruling in 1998 case of O'Brien v. Westlake City Schools Board of Education, which related to the internet and student rights.

== Personal life ==
Manos established a college scholarship program for local Greek students. One of the recipients was George Stephanopoulos, who had promised his father that he would eventually attend law school. He also mentored numerous other young lawyers, including current Ohio Supreme Court Justice Terrence O'Donnell, who clerked for Manos.

== Sources ==
Legal offices
Preceded by Ben Charles Green	Judge of the United States District Court for the Northern District of Ohio; 1976–1991	Succeeded by Lesley B. Wells
