= Rudolph Contreras =

American judge (born 1962)

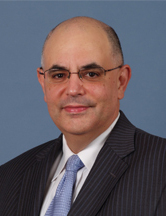

Presiding Judge of the United States Foreign Intelligence Surveillance Court
- In office May 19, 2021 – May 18, 2023
- Preceded by: James Boasberg
- Succeeded by: Anthony Trenga

Judge of the United States Foreign Intelligence Surveillance Court
- In office May 19, 2016 – May 18, 2023
- Appointed by: John Roberts
- Preceded by: Thomas F. Hogan
- Succeeded by: Sara Elizabeth Lioi

Judge of the United States District Court for the District of Columbia
- Incumbent
- Assumed office March 23, 2012
- Appointed by: Barack Obama
- Preceded by: Ricardo M. Urbina

Personal details
- Born: December 6, 1962 (age 63) Miami, Florida, U.S.
- Education: Florida State University (BS); University of Pennsylvania (JD)

Rudolph Contreras (born December 6, 1962) is a United States district judge of the United States District Court for the District of Columbia. He served as Presiding Judge on the United States Foreign Intelligence Surveillance Court from 2021 to 2023.

In December 2017 he briefly presided over the case of former National Security Advisor Michael Flynn, accepting Flynn's guilty plea, but was later recused from the case.

== Early life and education ==
Contreras was born in 1962 in Staten Island, New York. His parents were immigrants from Cuba, and he grew up in Miami.

Contreras graduated from Florida State University in 1984 with a Bachelor of Science. From 1985 to 1988, he worked for the Miami Herald as an account executive. He then attended the University of Pennsylvania Law School, graduating in 1991 with a Juris Doctor and Order of the Coif honors.

== Career ==
From 1991 to 1994, Contreras was an associate at Jones Day. In 1994 he was a government attorney in the District of Columbia. From 1994 to 2012, he served as an assistant United States attorney, in the District of Columbia from 1994 to 2003 and in the District of Delaware and as chief of the civil division from 2003 to 2006. He returned as an AUSA to the District of Columbia from 2006 to 2012, serving concurrently as chief of the civil division.

=== Federal judicial service ===
On July 28, 2011, President Barack Obama nominated Contreras to fill a vacancy on the United States District Court for the District of Columbia to replace Judge Ricardo M. Urbina, who assumed senior status in 2011. On October 4, 2011, the Senate Judiciary Committee held a hearing on his nomination and on November 3, 2011, reported his nomination to the floor of the Senate. On March 22, 2012, the Senate confirmed Contreras in a voice vote. He received his commission on March 23, 2012.

In April 2016 Chief Justice John Roberts appointed Contreras to the United States Foreign Intelligence Surveillance Court for a term starting May 19, 2016. On May 19, 2021, Contreras was named the Presiding Judge.

=== Notable cases ===
On November 17, 2016, Contreras dismissed a lawsuit against U.S. Senate Majority Leader Mitch McConnell seeking to compel a vote on the U.S. Supreme Court nomination of Merrick Garland, finding that the plaintiff, who had simply said he was a voter, had no standing to sue.

In 2017, Contreras was assigned the case of United States of America v. Michael T. Flynn, the former National Security Adviser to President Donald Trump. The two-page indictment was released on December 1, 2017. Contreras accepted Flynn's guilty plea to one count of making false statements to the FBI in the course of their investigation into Russian interference in the 2016 U.S. presidential election. The guilty plea was part of a plea bargain with the Special Counsel investigation led by Robert S. Mueller III. On December 7, 2017, Contreras was recused from further sentencing hearings scheduled to take place in the future. The case was reassigned to District Judge Emmet G. Sullivan. According to several reputable sources, text messages show that Peter Strzok, a veteran FBI counterintelligence official who worked on the Flynn case as part of Mueller's team, knew Contreras.

On August 6, 2020, Contreras dismissed a lawsuit House Republicans filed against U.S. House Speaker Nancy Pelosi that challenged proxy voting rules adopted during the 2020 COVID-19 pandemic. He ruled that the Constitution's "Speech or Debate Clause" prohibited lawsuits over Congress's legislative efforts, concluding, "the Court can conceive of few other actions, besides actually debating, speaking, or voting, that could more accurately be described as 'legislative' than the regulation of how votes may be cast".

On March 5, 2021, Contreras ruled that the states of Illinois, Nevada, and Virginia had ratified the Equal Rights Amendment too late for the amendment to be valid, as they did so after the congressionally imposed 1982 deadline.

On March 4, 2025, Contreras ruled that President Donald Trump had unlawfully terminated Merit Systems Protection Board Chair Cathy Harris. Harris had been dismissed via a two-sentence email on February 10, 2025, with no reason given. Contreras found that under the Civil Service Reform Act of 1978, MSPB members can be removed only for "inefficiency, neglect of duty, or malfeasance in office", and ordered Harris reinstated. Citing the 1935 Supreme Court precedent Humphrey's Executor v. United States, he wrote that "direct political control over the MSPB would neuter the Civil Service Reform Act's statutory scheme." The Justice Department immediately appealed, and on March 28, 2025, the D.C. Circuit granted an emergency stay, effectively allowing Trump to remove Harris while the case continued.

On May 29, 2025, Contreras ruled that Trump's tariffs imposed under the International Emergency Economic Powers Act (IEEPA) were unlawful. In Learning Resources, Inc. v. Trump, two Illinois-based toy manufacturers challenged Trump's tariffs on imports from China, Canada, Mexico, and other countries. Contreras found that IEEPA "does not authorize the president to impose the tariffs set forth" in Trump's executive orders, writing, "the power to regulate is not the power to tax". Unlike the Court of International Trade, which issued a nationwide injunction the previous day, Contreras's order applied only to the two plaintiffs. The case was consolidated with others, and on February 20, 2026, the Supreme Court ruled that the IEEPA tariffs were unlawful.

== See also ==
- List of Hispanic and Latino American jurists

Legal offices
Preceded by Ricardo M. Urbina	Judge of the United States District Court for the District of Columbia; 2012–present	Incumbent
Preceded by Thomas F. Hogan	Judge of the United States Foreign Intelligence Surveillance Court; 2016–2023	Succeeded by Sara Elizabeth Lioi
Preceded by James Boasberg	Presiding Judge of the United States Foreign Intelligence Surveillance Court; 2021–2023	Succeeded by Anthony Trenga
