= Nettie Cronise Lutes =

American lawyer (1843–1923)

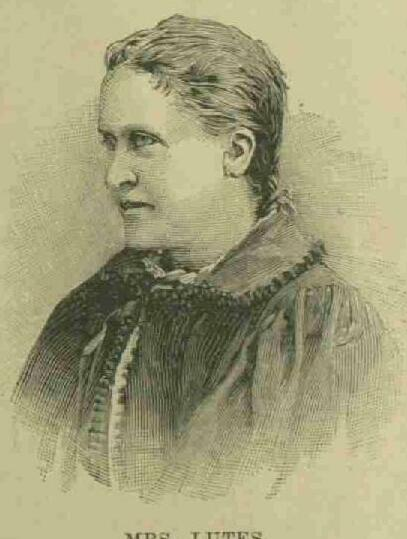
- Born: 26 September 1843; Republic
- Died: 31 July 1923 (aged 79)
- Occupation: Lawyer
- Family: Florence Cronise

Annette Cronise Lutes (September 26, 1843, Tiffin, Ohio - July 31, 1923, Tiffin, Ohio) was the first woman admitted to the bar in the state of Ohio.

== Biography ==
Lutes was born Annette Staub; her parents were Dr. Jacob Staub and Katherine Barbara Cronise, daughter of state senator Henry Cronise, a prominent early settler of Tiffin, Ohio. Her parents were divorced when Lutes and her sisters Alice and Florence were still children, and her mother brought the children to live with their grandfather; their last names were changed to Cronise. "Nettie" attended Heidelberg College and the State Normal School at Bloomington, Indiana before studying law at the office of Warren P. Noble. Lutes went in front of a panel of judges in 1873 to make her argument that she should be admitted to the bar, and was successful. Her sister Florence was admitted to the bar six months later, and the sisters formed their own firm in Tiffin, Ohio, called N. & F. Cronise, Attorneys at Law. In 1879, after the passage of a law made it possible for them to practice in federal courts, they were admitted to practice at the federal district court in Toledo.

Nettie married Nelson B. Lutes, a fellow lawyer she had met while studying the law in 1874. In 1880 Lutes ceased practicing with her sister and joined her husband's firm because he was losing his hearing and needed her assistance. A biography described their method of conducting trials like this: "Mrs. Lutes sits facing Mr. Lutes, and if a jury trial, also facing the jury, and repeats, by the motion of the organs of speech, without sound or whisper, every word that is spoken by the witnesses, judge, and opposing counsel, on the instant the words leave the mouth of the speaker..." Nettie did more than just translate for her husband, they were regarded as full partners and highly successful in their practice.

Nelson Lutes died in 1900, and Nettie continued in sole practice until she was joined by her daughter Evlyn Latta Lutes (1877–1968), who was admitted to the bar in 1905. This may have been the first mother-daughter law practice in the nation. Nettie applied for a widow's Civil War pension but was denied because she had too much money; after her appeal was denied, she tried to get a private bill passed in Congress to give her the pension.

Nelson and Nettie had three daughters - Elinor Seney Lutes (1875–1963); Evlyn Latta Lutes; and Lillian Cronise Lutes (b. 1882). Nettie was buried by the Washington Memorial Chapel in Valley Forge, Pennsylvania, probably at the request of her daughter Lillian, who had written several historical articles about Valley Forge.

The three Lutes daughters founded a settlement house in Philadelphia in 1933 which operated until at least 1953.

== Legacy ==
The women's section of the Ohio State Bar awards the Nettie Cronise Lutes Award annually, to women lawyers who have "improved the legal profession through their own high level of professionalism and who have opened doors for other women and girls".

In 2013 an Ohio Historical Marker honoring Nettie and Florence Cronise as the first women to be accepted to the bar in Ohio was erected in Tiffin. Also in 2013, Court Street between Washington and Jefferson streets was given the honorary street name N. & F. Cronise Way.

== See also ==
- List of first women lawyers and judges in Ohio
