= Michael Hendershot =

American judge (born 1974)

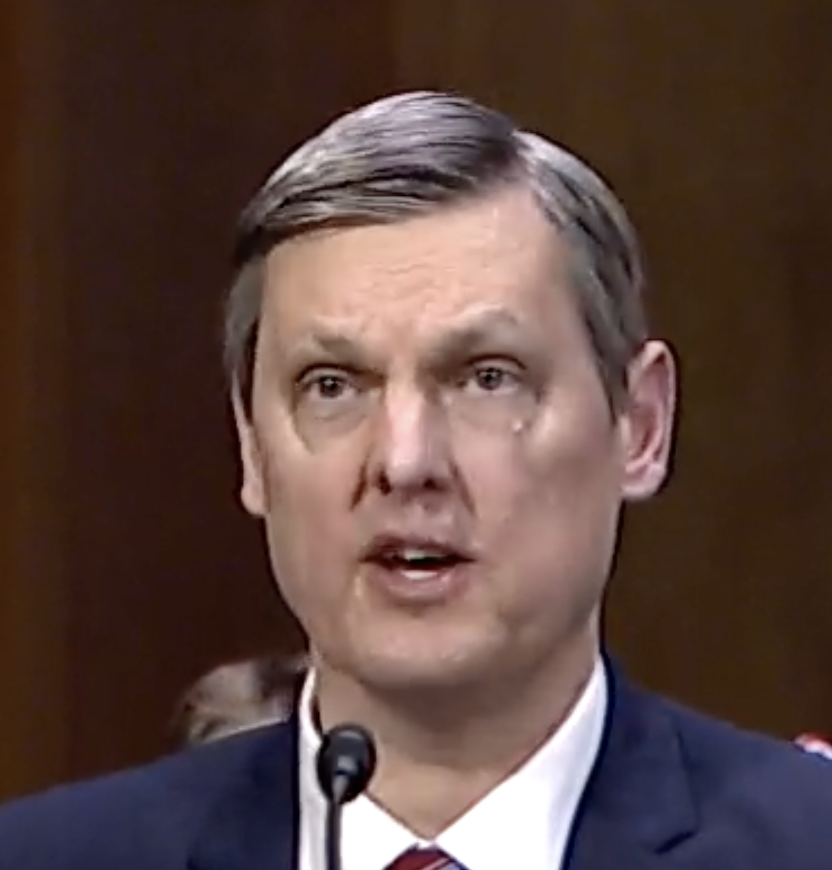

Judge of the United States District Court for the Northern District of Ohio
- Incumbent
- Assumed office July 9, 2026
- Appointed by: Donald Trump
- Preceded by: Patricia Anne Gaughan

Personal details
- Born: Michael Jason Hendershot; 1974 (age 51–52) Columbus, Ohio, U.S.
- Education: Ohio Wesleyan University (BA); University of Virginia (JD)

Michael Jason Hendershot (born 1974) (known professionally as Michael Hendershot) is an American lawyer who serves as a United States district judge of the United States District Court for the Northern District of Ohio He previously was the chief deputy state solicitor in the office of the Solicitor General of Ohio from 2011 to 2026.

== Education ==
Henderson received his Bachelor of Arts degree in 1997 from Ohio Wesleyan University, graduating as class valedictorian, and his Juris Doctor in 2001 from the University of Virginia School of Law, graduating Order of the Coif. He clerked for Judge Jerry Edwin Smith of the United States Court of Appeals for the Fifth Circuit from 2001 to 2002 and then for Associate Justice Terrence O'Donnell of the Ohio Supreme Court from 2005 to 2006.

== Career ==
From 2002 to 2005, Hendershot worked as an associate for Perkins Coie LLP at its Phoenix office. From 2006 to 2011, he was an associate with the law firm of Vorys, Sater, Seymour and Pease in Columbus, where he practiced appellate and general litigation. He is a past chair of the Ohio State Bar Association (OSBA) Appellate Practice Committee and served on the board that certifies lawyers as appellate specialists. From 2011 to 2026, Hendershot served as the chief deputy state solicitor in the office of the Solicitor General of Ohio.

=== Federal judicial service ===
On April 1, 2026, President Donald Trump announced his intention to nominate Hendershot to an undesignated seat on the United States District Court for the Northern District of Ohio. On April 14, 2026, Trump nominated him to the seat vacated by Judge Patricia Anne Gaughan. On April 29, 2026, he had his confirmation hearing with the United States Senate Committee on the Judiciary. On June 18, 2026, the committee advanced his nomination on a 12–10 party-line vote. On June 24, 2026, the Senate invoked cloture on Hendershot nomination by a 52–45 vote. Later that day he was confirmed by 50–44 vote. He received his judicial commission on July 9, 2026.

Legal offices
| Preceded by Patricia Anne Gaughan | Judge of the United States District Court for the Northern District of Ohio; 2026–present | Incumbent |
