= Clarence Emir Allen =

American politician (1852–1932)

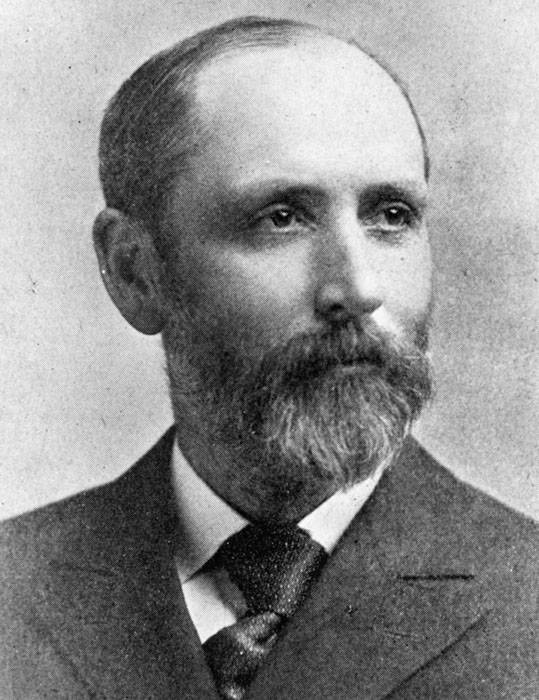

Member of the U.S. House of Representatives from Utah's at-large district
- In office January 4, 1896 – March 3, 1897
- Preceded by: None
- Succeeded by: William H. King

Personal details
- Born: September 8, 1852 Girard Township, Pennsylvania, US
- Died: July 9, 1932 (aged 79) Escondido, California, US
- Party: Republican
- Spouse: Corinne Marie Tuckerman
- Children: Florence E. Allen; Esther Allen Gaw; John "Jack" Alban Allen; Clarence Emir Allen, Jr. Helen Anderson Allen Shockey; Elizabeth Allen Sloane; Kate Allen
- Education: Western Reserve College
- Profession: Lawyer

Clarence Emir Allen (September 8, 1852 – July 9, 1932) was a U.S. representative from Utah.

Born in Girard Township, Pennsylvania, Allen attended the district school and Girard (Pennsylvania) Academy. He studied law. He graduated from Western Reserve College, then at Hudson, Ohio, graduating in 1877 Phi Beta Kappa.

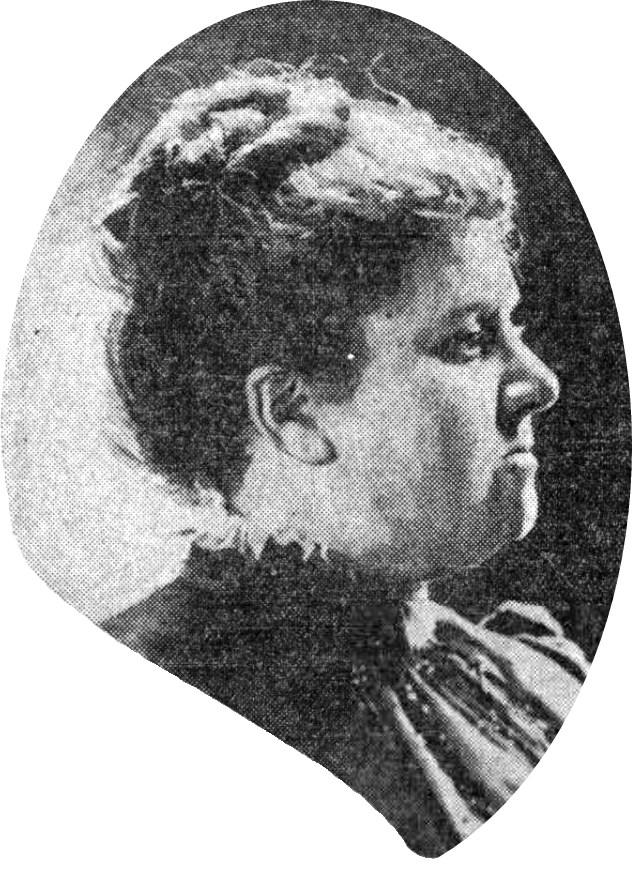
Corinne Marie Allen (née Tuckerman)

After graduation, Allen married Corinne Marie Tuckerman, where together they had seven children—five girls, one of whom died in infancy, and two boys. Their daughter Florence E. Allen, became the first woman to serve on a state supreme court, the Ohio Supreme Court, and first woman judge to serve on a federal court, United States Court of Appeals for the Sixth Circuit. Another daughter, Esther Allen Gaw, served as the Dean of Women at Ohio State University. Their two sons lost their lives due to World War I. Three of his daughters, Florence, Esther, and Helen, graduated from his alma mater Western Reserve, present-day Case Western Reserve University.

== Baseball fame ==
In the mid-1870s, Allen pitched collegiately for Western Reserve College, now known as Case Western Reserve University. He is credited as the first college baseball player to perfect the curve ball, and notably never lost a game once mastering the "curve." With fellow college teammate, John P. Barden, Allen played professionally with the Erie Keystones during the summer of 1876. While in Erie, he learned the concept of a curve ball from a competitive Pittsburgh pitcher, perfecting it in the college ranks.

== Professional and political life ==
Allen served as an instructor of Greek at Western Reserve College from 1880 to 1881. He moved to Salt Lake City, Utah Territory, in August 1881 and was an instructor at Salt Lake Academy until 1886, when he resigned to engage in mining pursuits. He served as member of the territorial House of Representatives in 1888, 1890, and 1894.

Allen and his college-educated wife (of Smith College), Corinne, both strongly supported public education. Allen is credited with authoring a bill passed by the territorial legislature in 1890 that provided free public schools for students age six to eighteen. Some have called him the "Father of Utah's Free Schools."

Allen was elected county clerk of Salt Lake County in August 1890 and served until January 1, 1893.

He was admitted to the bar in 1893 and commenced practice in Salt Lake City. He was an unsuccessful Liberal candidate for election in 1892 as a Delegate to the Fifty-third Congress. He served as delegate to the Republican National Convention in 1892 and 1896.

With the admission of Utah as a State into the Union, Allen was elected as a Republican to the Fifty-fourth Congress and served from January 4, 1896, to March 3, 1897. He declined to be a candidate for renomination in 1896.

He resumed his former mining pursuits until 1922, when he retired from active business and resided in Columbus, Ohio, until 1931. He died in Escondido, California on July 9, 1932. His body was cremated and the ashes interred in Salt Lake City's Mount Olivet Cemetery.

U.S. House of Representatives
Preceded by new seat	Member of the U.S. House of Representatives from Utah's 1st congressional district 1896–1897	Succeeded by William H. King
