= Patricia Anne Gaughan =

American judge (born 1953)

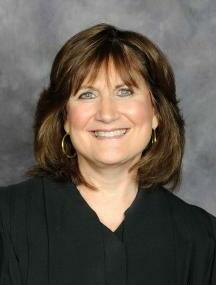

Senior Judge of the United States District Court for the Northern District of Ohio
- Incumbent
- Assumed office October 1, 2023

Chief Judge of the United States District Court for the Northern District of Ohio
- In office June 1, 2017 – June 5, 2023
- Preceded by: Solomon Oliver Jr.
- Succeeded by: Sara Elizabeth Lioi

Judge of the United States District Court for the Northern District of Ohio
- In office December 26, 1995 – October 1, 2023
- Appointed by: Bill Clinton
- Preceded by: Ann Aldrich
- Succeeded by: Michael Hendershot

Personal details
- Born: October 21, 1953 (age 72) Lakewood, Ohio, U.S.
- Education: Saint Mary's College (BA); University of Notre Dame (JD)

Patricia Anne Gaughan (born October 21, 1953) is a senior United States district judge of the United States District Court for the Northern District of Ohio.

== Education and career ==
Born in Lakewood, Ohio, Gaughan received a Bachelor of Arts degree from Saint Mary's College in 1975 and a Juris Doctor from Notre Dame Law School in 1978. She was an assistant prosecuting attorney of the Criminal Trial Division, Cuyahoga County Prosecutor's Office, Ohio from 1978 to 1983 and from 1984 to 1987. She was an Assistant United States Attorney of the Economic Crime Division, Northern District of Ohio from 1983 to 1984. She was an adjunct professor at Cleveland Marshall College of Law, Cleveland State University from 1983 to 1987, and was in private practice in Cleveland from 1984 to 1987. She was a judge of the Cuyahoga County Court of Common Pleas from 1987 to 1995.

=== Federal judicial service ===
On September 29, 1995, Gaughan was nominated by President Bill Clinton to a seat on the United States District Court for the Northern District of Ohio vacated by Ann Aldrich. Gaughan was confirmed by the United States Senate on December 22, 1995, and received her commission on December 26, 1995. She served as chief judge from 2017 to 2023. She assumed senior status on October 1, 2023.

== Sources ==
Legal offices
Preceded by Ann Aldrich	Judge of the United States District Court for the Northern District of Ohio; 1995–2023	Succeeded by Michael Hendershot
Preceded by Solomon Oliver Jr.	Chief Judge of the United States District Court for the Northern District of Ohio; 2017–2023	Succeeded by Sara Elizabeth Lioi
