= David A. Ruiz =

American judge (born 1973)

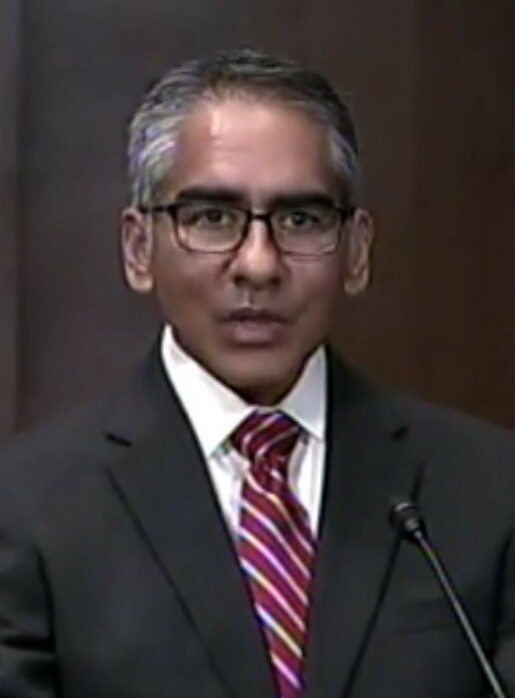

Judge of the United States District Court for the Northern District of Ohio
- Incumbent
- Assumed office February 8, 2022
- Appointed by: Joe Biden
- Preceded by: Solomon Oliver Jr.

Magistrate Judge of the United States District Court for the Northern District of Ohio
- In office October 1, 2016 – February 8, 2022
- Preceded by: Kenneth S. McHargh

Personal details
- Born: 1973 (age 52–53) Toledo, Ohio, U.S
- Education: Ohio State University (BA, JD)

David Augustin Ruiz (born 1973) is a United States district judge of the United States District Court for the Northern District of Ohio. He served as a United States magistrate judge of the same court from 2016 to 2022.

== Education ==
Ruiz received his Bachelor of Arts from Ohio State University in 1997 and his Juris Doctor from the Ohio State University Moritz College of Law in 2000.

== Legal career ==
From 2001 to 2003, Ruiz worked in private practice in Pittsburgh, Pennsylvania. From 2003 to 2010, he worked as a senior attorney at Calfee Halter & Griswold in Cleveland. From 2010 to 2016, he served as an Assistant United States Attorney in the Northern District of Ohio. Prior to Ruiz becoming a United States magistrate judge, he served as a pro bono attorney for The Legal Aid Society of Cleveland.

== Federal judicial service ==
Ruiz was sworn in as a United States magistrate judge on October 1, 2016. He filled the vacancy left by the retirement of Judge Kenneth S. McHargh on September 30, 2016.

On September 30, 2021, President Joe Biden nominated Ruiz to serve as a United States district judge of the United States District Court for the Northern District of Ohio. President Biden nominated Ruiz to the seat vacated by Judge Solomon Oliver Jr., who assumed senior status on February 15, 2021. On November 17, 2021, a hearing on his nomination was held before the Senate Judiciary Committee. During his confirmation hearing, Senator Marsha Blackburn questioned whether he had enough of a background in criminal proceedings to serve as a judge. On December 16, 2021, his nomination was reported out of committee by a 14–8 vote. On January 3, 2022, his nomination was returned to the President under Rule XXXI, Paragraph 6 of the United States Senate; he was renominated the same day.

On January 13, 2022, his nomination was reported out of committee by a 14–8 vote. On February 1, 2022, the Senate invoked cloture on his nomination by a 59–38 vote. Later that day, his nomination was confirmed by a 62–35 vote. He received his judicial commission on February 8, 2022. He was sworn in on February 10, 2022. He became the first Hispanic district court judge in Ohio.

== See also ==
- List of Hispanic and Latino American jurists

Legal offices
Preceded by Solomon Oliver Jr.	Judge of the United States District Court for the Northern District of Ohio; 2022–present	Incumbent
