= Daisy D. Perkins =

American lawyer

- Education: Findlay College
- Occupation: Lawyer
- Employer: Office of the Columbus Prosecutor
- Known for: Ohio’s first African American female lawyer

Daisy D. Perkins was Ohio’s first African American female lawyer.

Perkins’ father was John Perkins, a runaway slave who opened a barber shop after settling in North Baltimore, Ohio. She lost her mother at fourteen months of age. Perkins went on to attend Findlay College with the financial support of her sisters.

She relocated to Columbus, Ohio and became an autodidact in law. Her legal tutelage was provided by M.B. Earnhart, a Caucasian judge. In 1919, after having taken the bar examination seven times, she became the first African American female admitted to practice law in Ohio. Later, she became a lawyer for the Office of the Columbus Prosecutor.

== See also ==
- List of first women lawyers and judges in Ohio
