= Ogren (automobile company) =

Defunct American motor vehicle manufacturer

Ogren Motor Car Company
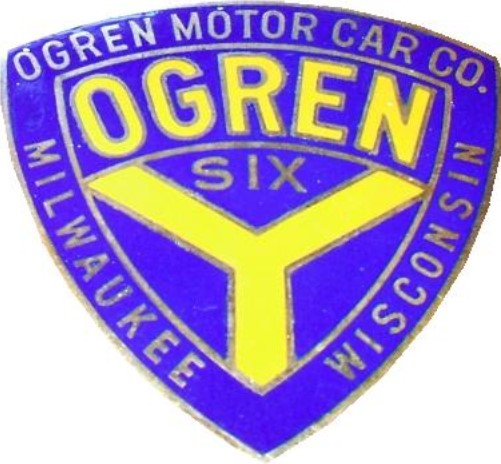

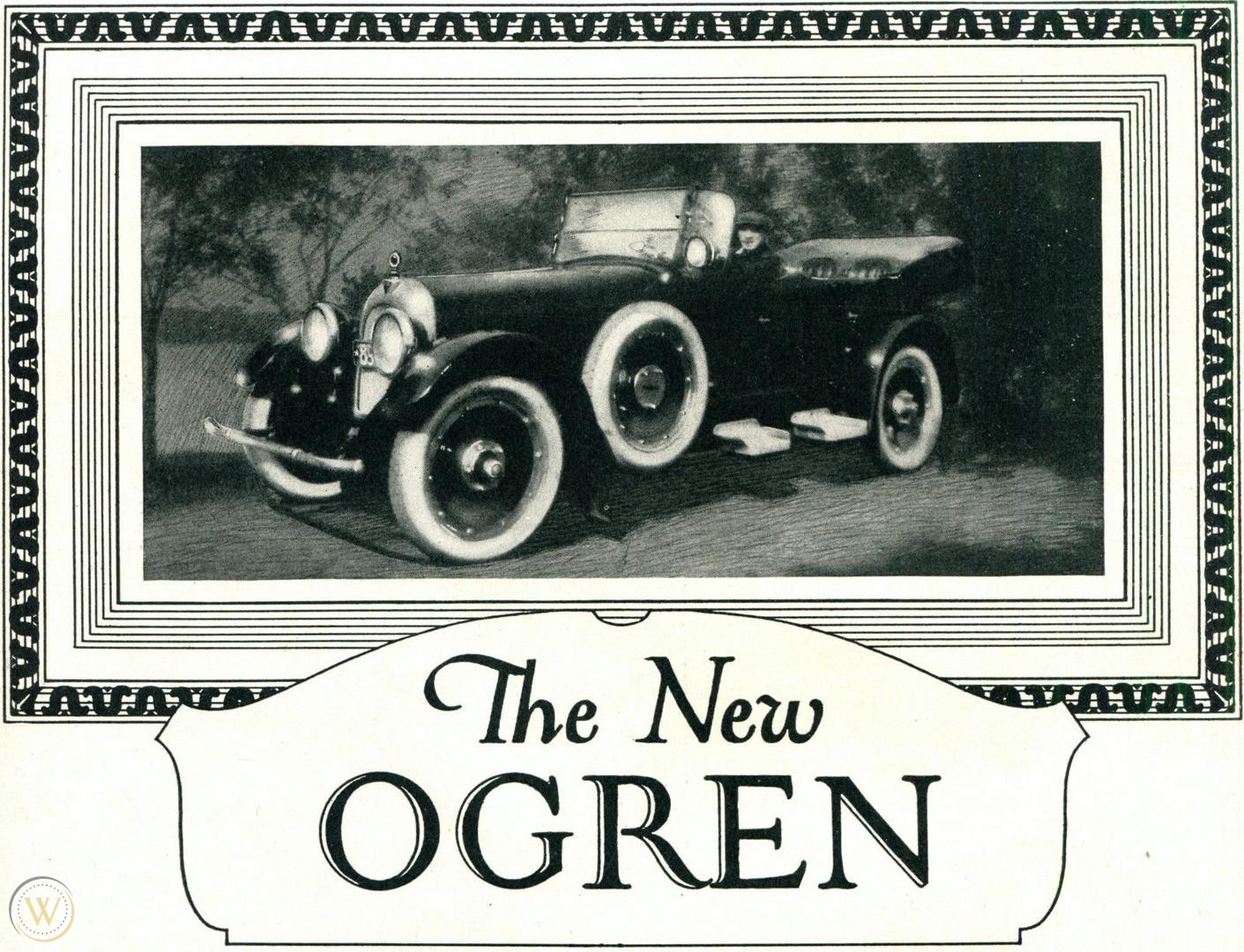
- Company type: Automobile manufacturer
- Industry: Automotive
- Founded: 1914; 111 years ago
- Founder: Hugo W. Ogren
- Defunct: 1923; 102 years ago
- Fate: Bankruptcy
- Headquarters: Chicago, Waukegan, Illinois, Milwaukee, Wisconsin, United States
- Key people: Hugo W. Ogren, Fred G. Smith
- Products: Automobiles
- Production output: less than 200 (1920-1923)

The Ogren Motor Car Company was a vintage era luxury automobile manufacturer based in Chicago, Illinois from 1915 to 1917 and in Milwaukee, Wisconsin from 1920 to 1923.

== History in Illinois ==
In the fall of 1914, Hugo W. Ogren founded the company in Chicago to build one-off race cars, but in 1915, he started to produce a six-cylinder touring car. In 1915 prototypes were made, but in 1916 capital stock increased to $1,000,000, and Ogren moved his company to a larger factory at Waukegan, Illinois. From 1916 he produced a line of six-cylinder cars but in 1917 the company ran out of operating cash. The factory was sold at auction on Nov. 22, 1917.

=== Models ===
Model (year)	Engine	Horsepower	Wheelbase	Transmission
Model P (1915–1917)	Six-cylinder	34	133"	3-speed manual

== History in Wisconsin ==
In 1919, the company was re-established and the Elite ice skating rink in Milwaukee, Wisconsin was remodeled into a factory. The first Ogren Six did not appear until July 1920. The new automobiles were more expensive and more powerful with a Beaver engine (65 hp vs. 34 hp). In 1922, the Beaver engine was replaced with a more powerful Continental engine. Price for the luxury car ranged from $4,250 to $5,500 (equivalent to $103,319 in 2024).

Late in 1922, Hugo Ogren left the company to join another automobile venture. Fred G. Smith took over and attempted to re-organize with only limited success. In January 1924 the tools and property of Ogren Motor Car Company were sold to Huffman Bros. Motor Co of Elkhart, Indiana.

=== Models ===
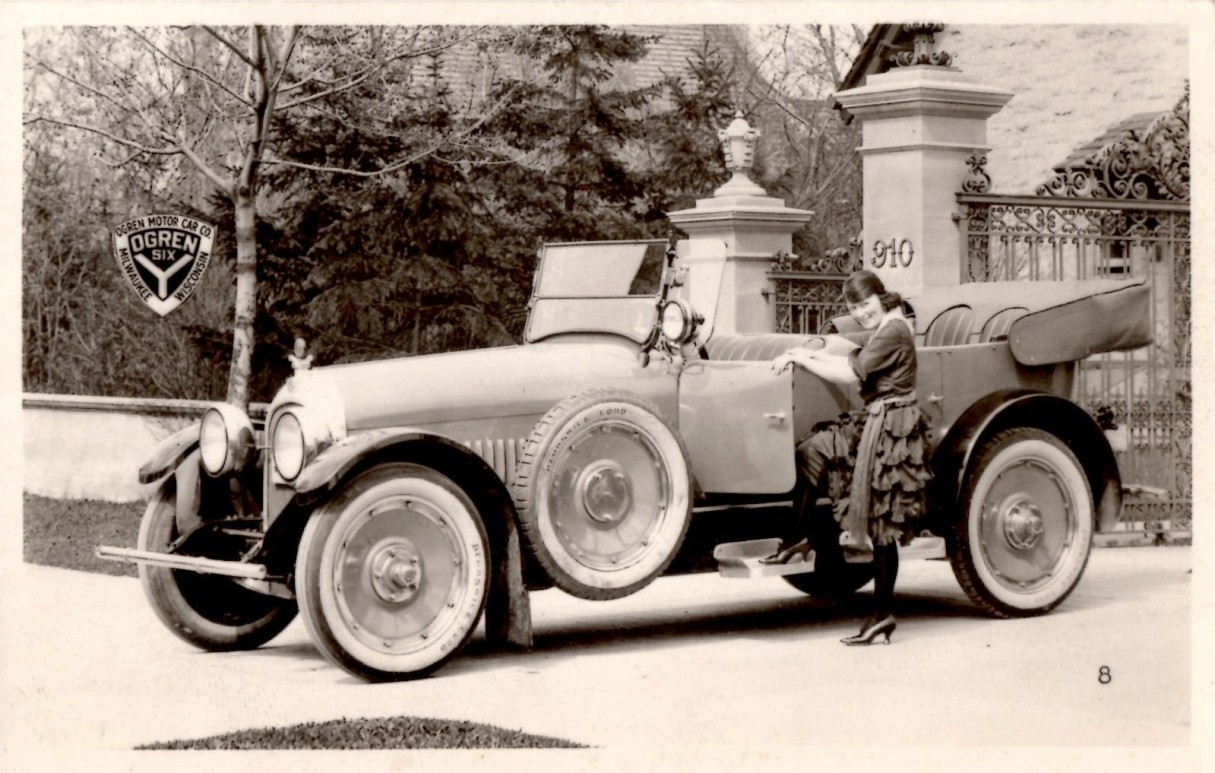
1921 Ogren factory photograph

Model	Engine	Horsepower	wheelbase	Transmission
Six (1920)	6-cylinder	65	132"	3-speed manual
Six (1921)	6-cylinder	65	134"	3-speed manual
Six (1922)	6-cylinder	70	134"	3-speed manual
Six (1923)	6-cylinder	70	134"	3-speed manual

== Gallery ==
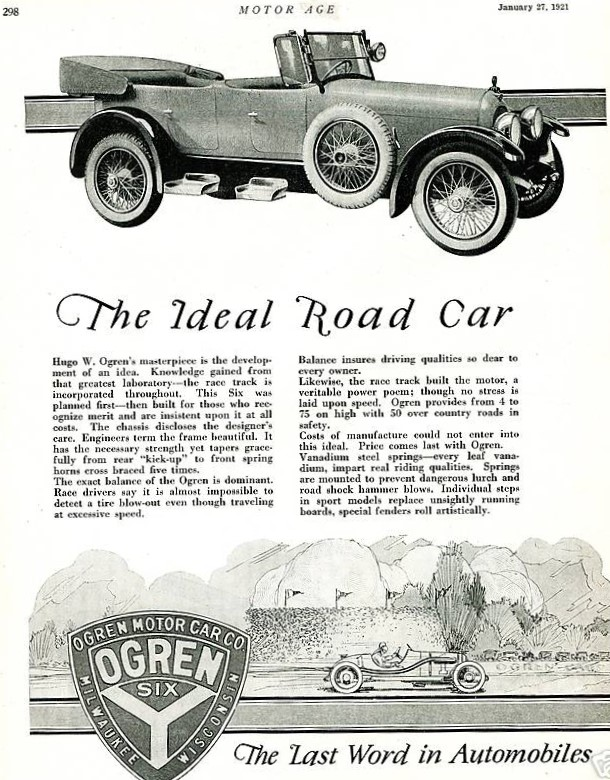
1921 Ogren Advertisement in Motor Age Magazine

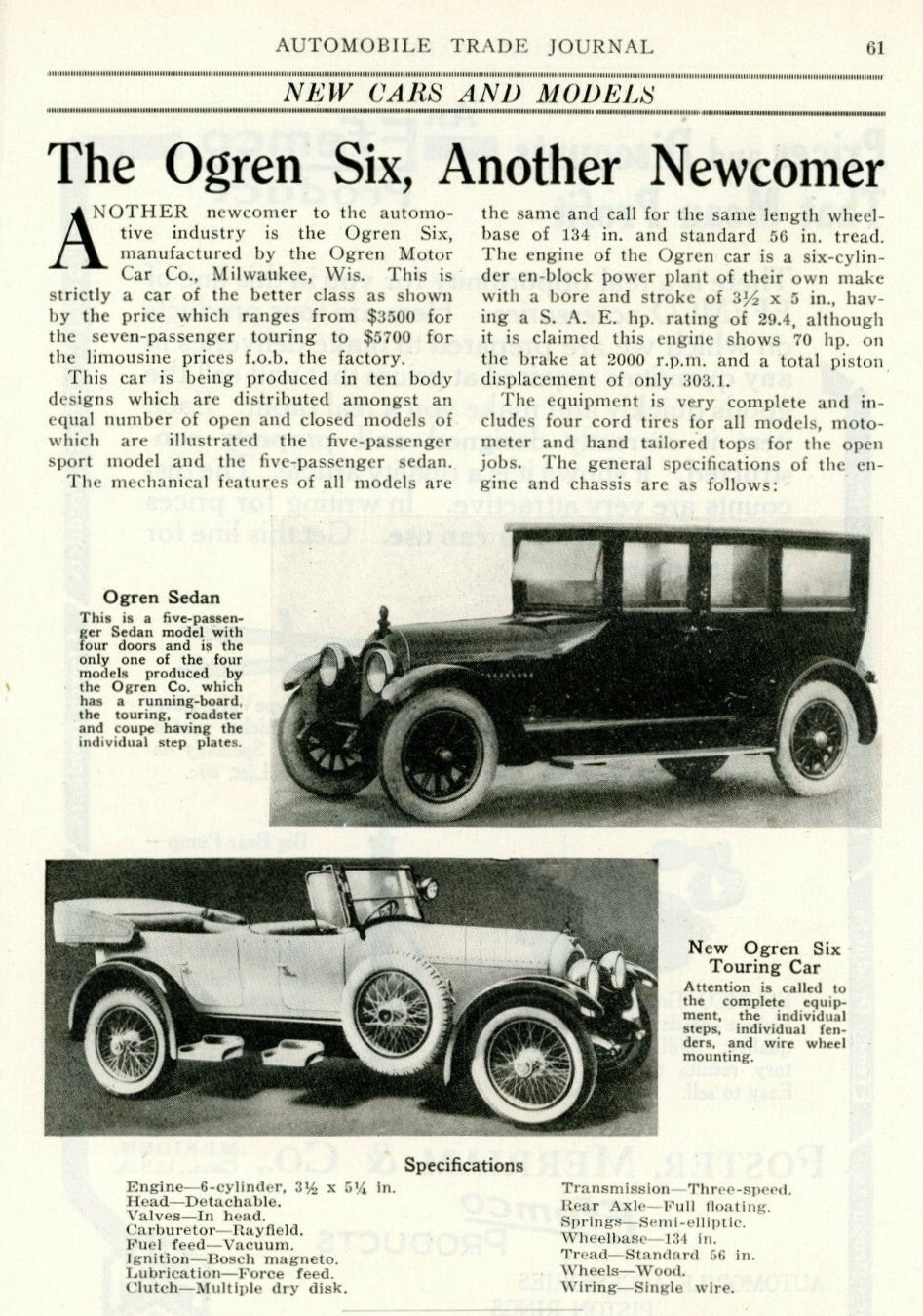
1921 Ogren Article in the Automobile Trade Journal
