= Paul Anders Ogren =

American politician (born 1951)

Paul Anders Ogren (born May 9, 1951) is a former American politician, carpenter, and farmer.

Ogren lived in Aitkin, Minnesota and was a farmer and carpenter. He went to Loyola Marymount University in Los Angeles, California, to study political science, and to University of Minnesota. Ogren was married to Sandra Gardebring Ogren, who served on the Minnesota Supreme Court. Ogren served in the Minnesota House of Representatives from 1981 to 1992 and was a Democrat.
