= Sandra Gardebring Ogren =

American judge

Sandra Sue Bailey Gardebring Ogren (June 14, 1947 – July 20, 2010) was an associate justice of the Minnesota Supreme Court appointed by Governor Rudy Perpich in 1991. She also served as vice president for Institutional Relations at the University of Minnesota, and Vice President for Advancement at California Polytechnic State University following her resignation from the Minnesota Supreme Court in 1998.

Born in Bismarck, North Dakota, she was the daughter of Jack and Viola Sauter Bailey. Gardebring graduated from Luther College and the University of Minnesota Law School in 1973 and died in California. She also served on the Minnesota Court of Appeals 1989 to 1991. Gardebring was married to Paul Anders Ogren, who served in the Minnesota Legislature, with two stepchildren.
