= Sara Elizabeth Lioi =

American judge (born 1960)

Sara Lioi
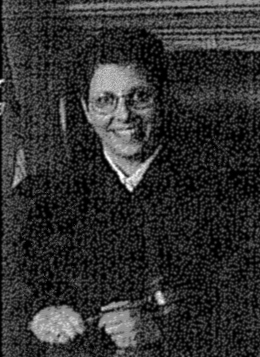
- Lioi in 2008

Chief Judge of the United States District Court for the Northern District of Ohio
- Incumbent
- Assumed office June 5, 2023
- Preceded by: Patricia Anne Gaughan

Judge of the United States Foreign Intelligence Surveillance Court
- Incumbent
- Assumed office May 19, 2023
- Appointed by: John Roberts
- Preceded by: Rudolph Contreras

Judge of the United States District Court for the Northern District of Ohio
- Incumbent
- Assumed office March 14, 2007
- Appointed by: George W. Bush
- Preceded by: Lesley B. Wells

Personal details
- Born: 1960 (age 65–66) Canton, Ohio, U.S.
- Education: Bowling Green State University (BA); Ohio State University (JD)

Sara Elizabeth Lioi (born 1960) is the chief United States district judge of the United States District Court for the Northern District of Ohio, while also serving as a judge of the United States Foreign Intelligence Surveillance Court.

== Early life and education ==
Born in Canton, Ohio, Lioi graduated from Bowling Green State University with a Bachelor of Arts degree in 1983 and later from Ohio State University College of Law with a Juris Doctor in 1987.

== Career ==
Following law school graduation, Lioi joined the law firm of Day, Ketterer, Raley, Wright & Rybolt, Ltd. in the fall of 1987 and was promoted to partner in that firm in December 1993. In November 1997, during his second term as Governor, George Voinovich appointed Lioi as a judge in the Stark County Court of Common Pleas, Central Division. She was elected to a four-year term in November 1998 and then re-elected for a six-year term in November 2002.

=== Federal judicial service ===
On the recommendation of Senators George Voinovich and Mike DeWine, Lioi was nominated to the United States District Court for the Northern District of Ohio by President George W. Bush on January 9, 2007, to a seat vacated by Lesley B. Wells as Wells took senior status. Lioi was confirmed by the Senate on March 8, 2007 and received her commission on March 14, 2007. She was sworn in as chief judge on June 5, 2023.

Lioi oversaw the prosecution of Jimmy Dimora and others in the Cuyahoga County corruption case, sentencing Dimora to 28 years. The case was affirmed on appeal to the United States Court of Appeals for the Sixth Circuit, and the Supreme Court declined to hear Dimora's further appeal.

== Sources ==
Legal offices
Preceded by Lesley B. Wells	Judge of the United States District Court for the Northern District of Ohio; 2007–present	Incumbent
Preceded by Patricia Anne Gaughan	Chief Judge of the United States District Court for the Northern District of Ohio; 2023–present	Incumbent
Preceded by Rudolph Contreras	Judge of the United States Foreign Intelligence Surveillance Court; 2023–present	Incumbent
