= Federal Judicial Center =

Education and research agency of the U.S. federal courts

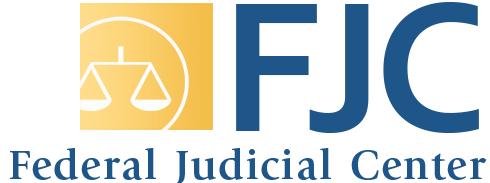

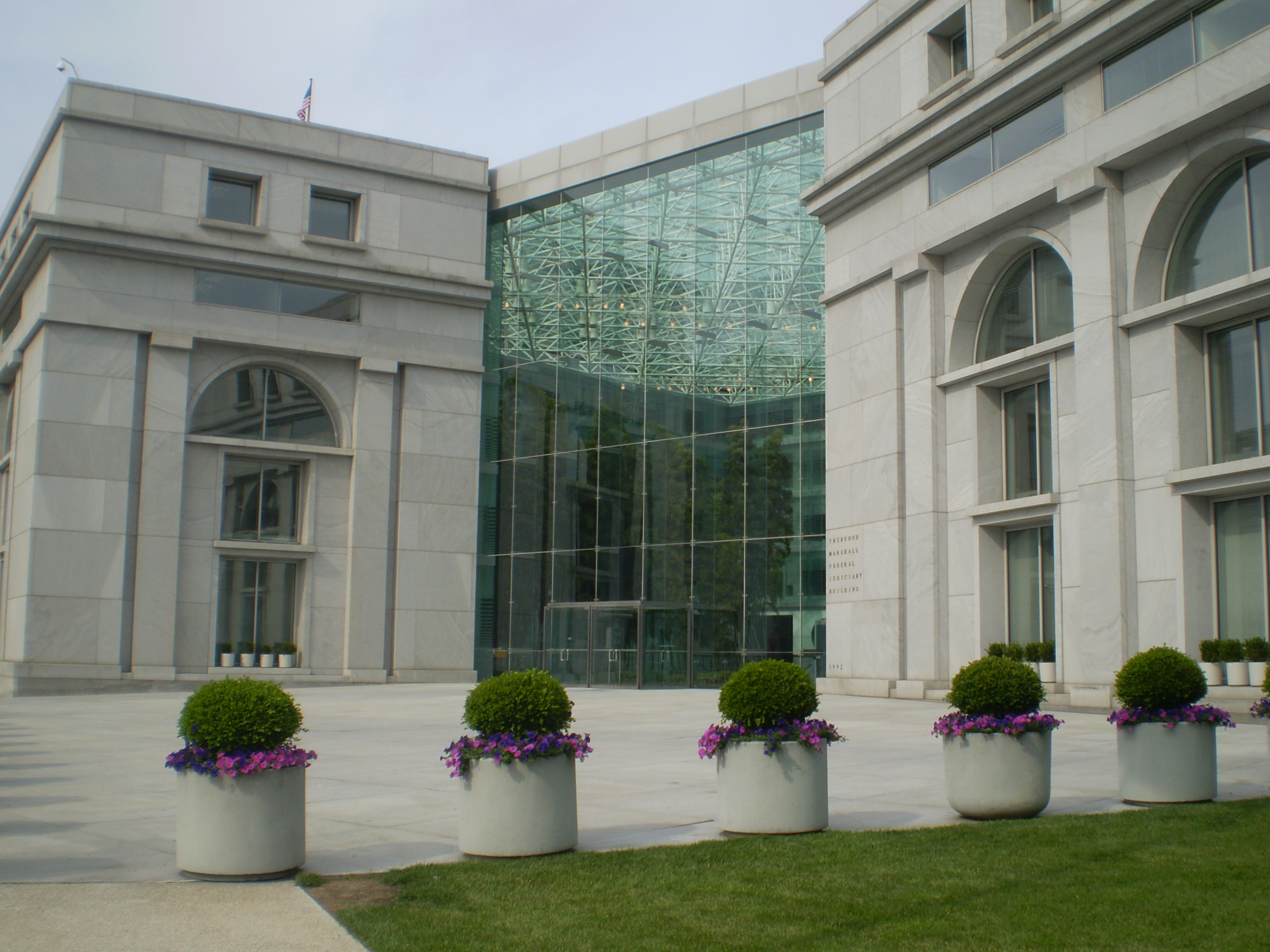
- Thurgood Marshall Federal Judiciary Building

Agency overview
- Formed: December 20, 1967
- Jurisdiction: United States Judiciary
- Headquarters: Thurgood Marshall Federal Judiciary Building Washington, D.C.
- Employees: 128 (2015)
- Annual budget: $27 million (2016)
- Agency executive: Robin L. Rosenberg, director
- Parent agency: Judicial Conference of the United States
- Website: www.fjc.gov

The Federal Judicial Center (FJC) is the education and research agency of the federal judiciary of the United States. It was established by Pub. L. 90–219 in 1967, at the recommendation of the Judicial Conference of the United States.

According to 28 U.S.C. § 620, the main areas of responsibility for the center include:

1. conducting and promoting "research and study of the operation of the courts of the United States," and to act to encourage and coordinate the same by others;
2. developing "recommendations for improvement of the administration and management of [U.S.] courts," and presenting these to the Judicial Conference of the U.S.; and
3. through all means available, see to conducting programs for the "continuing education and training for personnel" of the U.S. judiciary, for all employees in the justice system, from judges through probation officers and mediators.

In addition to these major provisions, §620 (b)(4)(5)(6) sets forth the additional provisions that the FJC will (i) provide staff and assistance to the Judicial Conference and component bodies, (ii) coordinate programs and research on the administration of justice with the State Justice Institute, and (iii) cooperatively assist other government agencies in providing advice, and receiving advice, regarding judicial administration in foreign countries, in each of these cases, to the extent it is "consistent with the performance of the other functions set forth" earlier.

The code also states (§621) that the chief justice of the United States is the permanent chair of the center's board, and that it includes the director of the Administrative Office of the United States Courts and seven federal judges elected by the Judicial Conference. The board appoints the center's director and deputy director; the director appoints the center's staff. Since its founding in 1967, the center has had eleven directors. The current director is Robin L. Rosenberg. The deputy director is Clara Altman.

== History ==
The Federal Judicial Center was established by Congress on the recommendation of Chief Justice Earl Warren and other members of the judiciary who hoped that regular programs of research and education would improve the efficiency of the federal courts and help to relieve the backlog of cases in the lower courts. Governed by its own board, the Federal Judicial Center offered the courts the benefits of independent social science research and educational programs designed to improve judicial administration.

In the 1950s and early 1960s, the Judicial Conference and the Administrative Office increasingly commissioned research projects to examine problems of judicial administration and organized educational programs to help judges manage growing and complicated caseloads. These research and educational programs had no permanent staff or funding. Support for an institutionalized program of judicial research and education increased after the establishment of 60 new district judgeships in 1961 demonstrated that the number of judges alone would not solve all of the problems of overworked courts. A growing number of judges and members of the bar urged the judiciary to establish a formal means to bring improved research and education to the courts.

At the suggestion of Chief Justice Warren, the Judicial Conference in 1966 authorized a committee to examine the research and education requirements of the judiciary. Former justice Stanley Reed agreed to Warren’s request to chair the committee. As the Reed committee formulated its recommendation for establishment of a Federal Judicial Center, President Johnson, at Warren’s request, included the proposal in his highly publicized message on crime in February 1967. The Judicial Committee adopted the recommendation. Bills to create the center were soon submitted in both houses of Congress. With broad support for the concept of a research and education center for the judiciary, discussion in the House and Senate hearings centered on questions about the proper institutional form and leadership for the center.

The Reed Committee and the director of the Administrative Office, among others, advocated an independent agency with its own governing board to which the center director would report. The goal was to protect the research and education resources from being absorbed into strictly administrative duties and to insure the objectivity of research. The Federal Judicial Center’s board consists of the chief justice, a rotating group of judges selected by the Judicial Conference, and the director of the Administrative Office; no member of the Judicial Conference was to serve on the center’s board. The statute authorizes the center to conduct and support research on the operation of the courts, to offer education and training for judges and court personnel, and to assist and advise the Judicial Conference on matters related to the administration and management of the courts. Later legislation expanded the center’s mandate to include programs related to the history of the federal judiciary.

== Manual chapter on climate science ==
In December 2025, the FJC published the updated Fourth Edition of the Reference Manual on Scientific Evidence (RMSE) in collaboration with the National Academies of Sciences, Engineering, and Medicine (NASEM), a congressionally chartered scientific advisory body.

The Fourth Edition sparked backlash due to the inclusion of a new chapter titled "Reference Guide on Climate Science." Critics, including 27 Republican state attorneys general, argued that this specific chapter shifted from neutral educational guidance to active advocacy, designed to influence judges in ongoing climate change litigation against U.S. fossil fuel companies.

In February 2026, prompted by a letter from 27 state attorneys general, FJC Director Rosenberg removed the climate science chapter from the manual and the FJC website, a decision condemned by a group of Democratic lawmakers. While the FJC removed the chapter, NASEM refused to do so, leaving the section available on its own website.

In April 2026, the Oversight Project, a 501(c)(4) nonprofit, formerly of the Heritage Foundation, released a report titled "Undermining Judicial Independence." It said that the chapter's authors failed to fully disclose their reliance on a previous paper that the chapter authors had co-authored with Michael Burger, an executive director of Columbia University's Sabin Center and someone in an of counsel role with Sher Edling, a law firm leading climate-related lawsuits in the United States. The report also argued that the chapter relied heavily on what it described as "plaintiff-aligned scholarship." Oversight Project attorney Kyle Brosnan called the manual chapter "biased, left-wing pseudoscholarship"; both Brosnan and the report called for defunding the Federal Judicial Center and National Academies of Science, Engineering, and Medicine.

In July 2026, days after the NASEM released a report on attribution science for extreme weather and climate events, President Donald Trump attacked the manual chapter, alleging that it was used by judges.

== Organization ==
The center includes several offices and divisions.

The Director's Office is responsible for the center's overall management and its relations with other organizations. Its Office of Systems Innovation and Development (OSID) provides technical support for Center education and research. Communications Policy and Design (CPD) edits, produces, and distributes all Center print and electronic publications, operates the Federal Judicial Television Network, and through the Information Services Office maintains a specialized library collection of materials on judicial administration.

The Research Division undertakes empirical and exploratory research on federal judicial processes, federal court rules, judicial resources, court administration and case management, federal-state jurisdiction and cooperation, and sentencing and its consequences, often at the request of the Judicial Conference and its committees, the courts themselves, or other groups in the federal system. Elizabeth Wiggins is the current director of the research division. She is the third research division director in the history of the Federal Judicial Center.

The Federal Judicial History Office develops programs relating to the history of the judicial branch and assists courts with their own judicial history program.

The Education Division plans and organizes educational sessions for federal judges and court staff.

The International Judicial Relations Office carries out the center's statutory mission to provide information about federal courts to officials of foreign judicial systems and to acquire information about foreign judicial systems that will help the center perform its other missions. The office administers the center's International Visitor briefing program and the Visiting Foreign Judicial Fellows Program.

A nonprofit organization, the Federal Judicial Center Foundation, solicits support for the center.

== Fellowships and visitorships ==
Individuals from outside the United States seeking to learn more about the work of the Federal Judicial Center can apply to the International Visitor briefing program or the Visiting Foreign Judicial Fellows Program, discussed above. U.S. citizens can seek a one-year placement at the Federal Judicial Center as part of the U.S. Supreme Court Fellows Program.

== Leadership ==
=== Directors ===
The director of the FJC is elected by the center's board of directors.

#	Name	Began	Ended	Prior position
1	Tom C. Clark	1968	1970	Retired justice, SCOTUS
2	Alfred P. Murrah	1970	1974	Judge, 10th Cir.
3	Walter Edward Hoffman	1974	1977	Judge, E.D. Va.
4	A. Leo Levin	1977	1987	Professor, University of Pennsylvania Law School
5	John Cooper Godbold	1987	1990	Judge, 11th Cir.
6	William Schwarzer	1990	1995	Judge, N.D. Cal.
7	Rya W. Zobel	1995	1999	Judge, D. Mass.
8	Fern M. Smith	1999	2003	Judge, N.D. Cal.
9	Barbara Jacobs Rothstein	2003	2011	Judge, W.D. Wash.
10	Jeremy Fogel	2011	2018	Judge, N.D. Cal.
11	John S. Cooke	2018	2025	Deputy director, FJC
12	Robin L. Rosenberg	2025	Incumbent	Judge, S.D. Fla.

=== Board members ===
Since it was founded, the center's board of directors has included the Chief Justice, two circuit judges, three district judges, and the director of the Administrative Office of the United States Courts. It has been expanded twice, in 1979 to include a bankruptcy judge, and in 1997 to include a magistrate judge. While the Chief Justice undergoes presidential appointment and congressional confirmation, and the AO director is appointed by the Chief Justice, the individual judges are elected to the board for four-year terms by the Judicial Conference of the United States.

Year	Chief Justice	Circuit judge	Circuit judge	District judge	District judge	District judge	AO director	Bankruptcy judge	Magistrate judge
1968	Earl Warren; Mar. 1968–Jun. 1969	Wade H. McCree; 6th Cir. Mar. 1968–Mar. 1973	James Marshall Carter; 9th Cir. Mar. 1968–Mar. 1971	William McRae; M.D. Fla. Mar. 1968–Mar. 1970	Edward Devitt; D. Minn. Mar. 1968–Mar. 1971	Harold R. Tyler Jr. S.D.N.Y. Mar. 1968–Mar. 1972	Ernest C. Friesen; Mar. 1968–Feb. 1970		
1969	Warren E. Burger; Jun. 1969–Sep. 1986	Wade H. McCree; 6th Cir. Mar. 1968–Mar. 1973	James Marshall Carter; 9th Cir. Mar. 1968–Mar. 1971	William McRae; M.D. Fla. Mar. 1968–Mar. 1970	Edward Devitt; D. Minn. Mar. 1968–Mar. 1971	Harold R. Tyler Jr. S.D.N.Y. Mar. 1968–Mar. 1972	Ernest C. Friesen; Mar. 1968–Feb. 1970		
1970	Warren E. Burger; Jun. 1969–Sep. 1986	Wade H. McCree; 6th Cir. Mar. 1968–Mar. 1973	James Marshall Carter; 9th Cir. Mar. 1968–Mar. 1971	Gerhard Gesell; D.D.C. Mar. 1970–Mar. 1972	Edward Devitt; D. Minn. Mar. 1968–Mar. 1971	Harold R. Tyler Jr. S.D.N.Y. Mar. 1968–Mar. 1972	Rowland F. Kirks; Jul. 1970–Nov. 1977		
1971	Warren E. Burger; Jun. 1969–Sep. 1986	Wade H. McCree; 6th Cir. Mar. 1968–Mar. 1973	Frank M. Coffin; 1st Cir. Mar. 1971–Oct. 1972	Gerhard Gesell; D.D.C. Mar. 1970–Mar. 1972	Adrian Anthony Spears; W.D. Tex. Mar. 1971–Mar. 1975	Harold R. Tyler Jr. S.D.N.Y. Mar. 1968–Mar. 1972	Rowland F. Kirks; Jul. 1970–Nov. 1977		
1972	Warren E. Burger; Jun. 1969–Sep. 1986	Wade H. McCree; 6th Cir. Mar. 1968–Mar. 1973	Ruggero J. Aldisert; 3rd Cir. Oct. 1972–Mar. 1979	Marvin E. Frankel; S.D.N.Y. Mar. 1972–Apr. 1978	Adrian Anthony Spears; W.D. Tex. Mar. 1971–Mar. 1975	Walter Edward Hoffman; E.D. Va. Mar. 1972–Sep. 1974	Rowland F. Kirks; Jul. 1970–Nov. 1977		
1973	Warren E. Burger; Jun. 1969–Sep. 1986	Griffin Bell; 5th Cir. Mar. 1973–Apr. 1976	Ruggero J. Aldisert; 3rd Cir. Oct. 1972–Mar. 1979	Marvin E. Frankel; S.D.N.Y. Mar. 1972–Apr. 1978	Adrian Anthony Spears; W.D. Tex. Mar. 1971–Mar. 1975	Walter Edward Hoffman; E.D. Va. Mar. 1972–Sep. 1974	Rowland F. Kirks; Jul. 1970–Nov. 1977		
1974	Warren E. Burger; Jun. 1969–Sep. 1986	Griffin Bell; 5th Cir. Mar. 1973–Apr. 1976	Ruggero J. Aldisert; 3rd Cir. Oct. 1972–Mar. 1979	Marvin E. Frankel; S.D.N.Y. Mar. 1972–Apr. 1978	Adrian Anthony Spears; W.D. Tex. Mar. 1971–Mar. 1975	Alfred A. Arraj; D. Colo. Sep. 1974–Apr. 1976	Rowland F. Kirks; Jul. 1970–Nov. 1977		
1975	Warren E. Burger; Jun. 1969–Sep. 1986	Griffin Bell; 5th Cir. Mar. 1973–Apr. 1976	Ruggero J. Aldisert; 3rd Cir. Oct. 1972–Mar. 1979	Marvin E. Frankel; S.D.N.Y. Mar. 1972–Apr. 1978	Robert Howard Schnacke; N.D. Cal. Mar. 1975–Mar. 1979	Alfred A. Arraj; D. Colo. Sep. 1974–Apr. 1976	Rowland F. Kirks; Jul. 1970–Nov. 1977		
1976	Warren E. Burger; Jun. 1969–Sep. 1986	John Cooper Godbold; 5th Cir. Apr. 1976–Mar. 1981	Ruggero J. Aldisert; 3rd Cir. Oct. 1972–Mar. 1979	Marvin E. Frankel; S.D.N.Y. Mar. 1972–Apr. 1978	Robert Howard Schnacke; N.D. Cal. Mar. 1975–Mar. 1979	Frank James McGarr; N.D. Ill. Apr. 1976–Mar. 1980	Rowland F. Kirks; Jul. 1970–Nov. 1977		
1977	Warren E. Burger; Jun. 1969–Sep. 1986	John Cooper Godbold; 5th Cir. Apr. 1976–Mar. 1981	Ruggero J. Aldisert; 3rd Cir. Oct. 1972–Mar. 1979	Marvin E. Frankel; S.D.N.Y. Mar. 1972–Apr. 1978	Robert Howard Schnacke; N.D. Cal. Mar. 1975–Mar. 1979	Frank James McGarr; N.D. Ill. Apr. 1976–Mar. 1980	William E. Foley; Nov. 1977–Mar. 1985		
1978	Warren E. Burger; Jun. 1969–Sep. 1986	John Cooper Godbold; 5th Cir. Apr. 1976–Mar. 1981	Ruggero J. Aldisert; 3rd Cir. Oct. 1972–Mar. 1979	Aubrey Eugene Robinson Jr. D.D.C. Apr. 1978–Mar. 1982	Robert Howard Schnacke; N.D. Cal. Mar. 1975–Mar. 1979	Frank James McGarr; N.D. Ill. Apr. 1976–Mar. 1980	William E. Foley; Nov. 1977–Mar. 1985		
1979	Warren E. Burger; Jun. 1969–Sep. 1986	John Cooper Godbold; 5th Cir. Apr. 1976–Mar. 1981	William Hughes Mulligan; 2nd Cir. Mar. 1979–Mar. 1981	Aubrey Eugene Robinson Jr. D.D.C. Apr. 1978–Mar. 1982	Otto Richard Skopil Jr. D. Ore. Mar. 1979–Sep. 1979	Frank James McGarr; N.D. Ill. Apr. 1976–Mar. 1980	William E. Foley; Nov. 1977–Mar. 1985	Lloyd D. George; D. Nev. Sep. 1979–Sep. 1983	
1980	Warren E. Burger; Jun. 1969–Sep. 1986	John Cooper Godbold; 5th Cir. Apr. 1976–Mar. 1981	William Hughes Mulligan; 2nd Cir. Mar. 1979–Mar. 1981	Aubrey Eugene Robinson Jr. D.D.C. Apr. 1978–Mar. 1982	Donald S. Voorhees; W.D. Wash. Sep. 1979–Mar. 1983	William S. Sessions; W.D. Tex. Mar. 1980–Mar. 1984	William E. Foley; Nov. 1977–Mar. 1985	Lloyd D. George; D. Nev. Sep. 1979–Sep. 1983	
1981	Warren E. Burger; Jun. 1969–Sep. 1986	Cornelia Groefsema Kennedy; 6th Cir. Mar. 1981–Mar. 1985	John D. Butzner Jr. 4th Cir. Mar. 1981–Mar. 1983	Aubrey Eugene Robinson Jr. D.D.C. Apr. 1978–Mar. 1982	Donald S. Voorhees; W.D. Wash. Sep. 1979–Mar. 1983	William S. Sessions; W.D. Tex. Mar. 1980–Mar. 1984	William E. Foley; Nov. 1977–Mar. 1985	Lloyd D. George; D. Nev. Sep. 1979–Sep. 1983	
1982	Warren E. Burger; Jun. 1969–Sep. 1986	Cornelia Groefsema Kennedy; 6th Cir. Mar. 1981–Mar. 1985	John D. Butzner Jr. 4th Cir. Mar. 1981–Mar. 1983	Warren Keith Urbom; D. Neb. Mar. 1982–Mar. 1986	Donald S. Voorhees; W.D. Wash. Sep. 1979–Mar. 1983	William S. Sessions; W.D. Tex. Mar. 1980–Mar. 1984	William E. Foley; Nov. 1977–Mar. 1985	Lloyd D. George; D. Nev. Sep. 1979–Sep. 1983	
1983	Warren E. Burger; Jun. 1969–Sep. 1986	Cornelia Groefsema Kennedy; 6th Cir. Mar. 1981–Mar. 1985	Daniel Mortimer Friedman; Fed. Cir. Mar. 1983–Mar. 1987	Warren Keith Urbom; D. Neb. Mar. 1982–Mar. 1986	Howard C. Bratton; D.N.M. Mar. 1983–Mar. 1987	William S. Sessions; W.D. Tex. Mar. 1980–Mar. 1984	William E. Foley; Nov. 1977–Mar. 1985	John J. Galgay; S.D.N.Y. Sep. 1983–May 1984	
1984	Warren E. Burger; Jun. 1969–Sep. 1986	Cornelia Groefsema Kennedy; 6th Cir. Mar. 1981–Mar. 1985	Daniel Mortimer Friedman; Fed. Cir. Mar. 1983–Mar. 1987	Warren Keith Urbom; D. Neb. Mar. 1982–Mar. 1986	Howard C. Bratton; D.N.M. Mar. 1983–Mar. 1987	A. David Mazzone; D. Mass. Mar. 1984–Mar. 1988	William E. Foley; Nov. 1977–Mar. 1985	Martin V. B. Bostetter; E.D. Va. Oct. 1984–Oct. 1987	
1985	Warren E. Burger; Jun. 1969–Sep. 1986	Arlin Adams; 3rd Cir. Mar. 1985–Jan. 1987	Daniel Mortimer Friedman; Fed. Cir. Mar. 1983–Mar. 1987	Warren Keith Urbom; D. Neb. Mar. 1982–Mar. 1986	Howard C. Bratton; D.N.M. Mar. 1983–Mar. 1987	A. David Mazzone; D. Mass. Mar. 1984–Mar. 1988	Leonidas Ralph Mecham; Jul. 1985–Jul. 2006	Martin V. B. Bostetter; E.D. Va. Oct. 1984–Oct. 1987	
1986	William Rehnquist; Sep. 1986–Sep. 2005	Arlin Adams; 3rd Cir. Mar. 1985–Jan. 1987	Daniel Mortimer Friedman; Fed. Cir. Mar. 1983–Mar. 1987	José A. Cabranes; D. Conn. Mar. 1986–Mar. 1990	Howard C. Bratton; D.N.M. Mar. 1983–Mar. 1987	A. David Mazzone; D. Mass. Mar. 1984–Mar. 1988	Leonidas Ralph Mecham; Jul. 1985–Jul. 2006	Martin V. B. Bostetter; E.D. Va. Oct. 1984–Oct. 1987	
1987	William Rehnquist; Sep. 1986–Sep. 2005	Alvin Benjamin Rubin; 5th Cir. Jan. 1987–Mar. 1989	Anthony Kennedy; 9th Cir. Mar. 1987–Feb. 1988	José A. Cabranes; D. Conn. Mar. 1986–Mar. 1990	William Clark O'Kelley; N.D. Ga. Mar. 1987–Mar. 1991	A. David Mazzone; D. Mass. Mar. 1984–Mar. 1988	Leonidas Ralph Mecham; Jul. 1985–Jul. 2006	Robert E. Ginsberg; N.D. Ill. Oct. 1987–Oct. 1991	
1988	William Rehnquist; Sep. 1986–Sep. 2005	Alvin Benjamin Rubin; 5th Cir. Jan. 1987–Mar. 1989	J. Clifford Wallace; 9th Cir. Mar. 1988–Mar. 1991	José A. Cabranes; D. Conn. Mar. 1986–Mar. 1990	William Clark O'Kelley; N.D. Ga. Mar. 1987–Mar. 1991	David Dudley Dowd Jr. N.D. Ohio; Mar. 1988–Mar. 1992	Leonidas Ralph Mecham; Jul. 1985–Jul. 2006	Robert E. Ginsberg; N.D. Ill. Oct. 1987–Oct. 1991	
1989	William Rehnquist; Sep. 1986–Sep. 2005	Monroe G. McKay; 10th Cir. Mar. 1989–Sep. 1991	J. Clifford Wallace; 9th Cir. Mar. 1988–Mar. 1991	José A. Cabranes; D. Conn. Mar. 1986–Mar. 1990	William Clark O'Kelley; N.D. Ga. Mar. 1987–Mar. 1991	David Dudley Dowd Jr. N.D. Ohio; Mar. 1988–Mar. 1992	Leonidas Ralph Mecham; Jul. 1985–Jul. 2006	Robert E. Ginsberg; N.D. Ill. Oct. 1987–Oct. 1991	
1990	William Rehnquist; Sep. 1986–Sep. 2005	Monroe G. McKay; 10th Cir. Mar. 1989–Sep. 1991	J. Clifford Wallace; 9th Cir. Mar. 1988–Mar. 1991	Diana E. Murphy; D. Minn. Mar. 1990–Mar. 1994	William Clark O'Kelley; N.D. Ga. Mar. 1987–Mar. 1991	David Dudley Dowd Jr. N.D. Ohio; Mar. 1988–Mar. 1992	Leonidas Ralph Mecham; Jul. 1985–Jul. 2006	Robert E. Ginsberg; N.D. Ill. Oct. 1987–Oct. 1991	
1991	William Rehnquist; Sep. 1986–Sep. 2005	J. Harvie Wilkinson III; 4th Cir. Sep. 1991–Mar. 1996	Edward R. Becker; 3rd Cir. Mar. 1991–Mar. 1995	Diana E. Murphy; D. Minn. Mar. 1990–Mar. 1994	Martin Leach-Cross Feldman; E.D. La. Mar. 1991–Mar. 1995	David Dudley Dowd Jr. N.D. Ohio; Mar. 1988–Mar. 1992	Leonidas Ralph Mecham; Jul. 1985–Jul. 2006	Sidney B. Brooks; D. Colo. Oct. 1991–Mar. 1993	
1992	William Rehnquist; Sep. 1986–Sep. 2005	J. Harvie Wilkinson III; 4th Cir. Sep. 1991–Mar. 1996	Edward R. Becker; 3rd Cir. Mar. 1991–Mar. 1995	Diana E. Murphy; D. Minn. Mar. 1990–Mar. 1994	Martin Leach-Cross Feldman; E.D. La. Mar. 1991–Mar. 1995	Michael Anthony Telesca; W.D.N.Y. Mar. 1992–Mar. 1996	Leonidas Ralph Mecham; Jul. 1985–Jul. 2006	Sidney B. Brooks; D. Colo. Oct. 1991–Mar. 1993	
1993	William Rehnquist; Sep. 1986–Sep. 2005	J. Harvie Wilkinson III; 4th Cir. Sep. 1991–Mar. 1996	Edward R. Becker; 3rd Cir. Mar. 1991–Mar. 1995	Diana E. Murphy; D. Minn. Mar. 1990–Mar. 1994	Martin Leach-Cross Feldman; E.D. La. Mar. 1991–Mar. 1995	Michael Anthony Telesca; W.D.N.Y. Mar. 1992–Mar. 1996	Leonidas Ralph Mecham; Jul. 1985–Jul. 2006	Elizabeth Perris; D. Ore. Mar. 1993–Mar. 1997	
1994	William Rehnquist; Sep. 1986–Sep. 2005	J. Harvie Wilkinson III; 4th Cir. Sep. 1991–Mar. 1996	Edward R. Becker; 3rd Cir. Mar. 1991–Mar. 1995	Marvin Aspen; N.D. Ill. Mar. 1994–Mar. 1998	Martin Leach-Cross Feldman; E.D. La. Mar. 1991–Mar. 1995	Michael Anthony Telesca; W.D.N.Y. Mar. 1992–Mar. 1996	Leonidas Ralph Mecham; Jul. 1985–Jul. 2006	Elizabeth Perris; D. Ore. Mar. 1993–Mar. 1997	
1995	William Rehnquist; Sep. 1986–Sep. 2005	J. Harvie Wilkinson III; 4th Cir. Sep. 1991–Mar. 1996	Bruce M. Selya; 1st Cir. Mar. 1995–Mar. 1999	Marvin Aspen; N.D. Ill. Mar. 1994–Mar. 1998	Richard Paul Matsch; D. Colo. Mar. 1995–Mar. 1999	Michael Anthony Telesca; W.D.N.Y. Mar. 1992–Mar. 1996	Leonidas Ralph Mecham; Jul. 1985–Jul. 2006	Elizabeth Perris; D. Ore. Mar. 1993–Mar. 1997	
1996	William Rehnquist; Sep. 1986–Sep. 2005	Pasco Bowman II; 8th Cir. Mar. 1996–Mar. 1998	Bruce M. Selya; 1st Cir. Mar. 1995–Mar. 1999	Marvin Aspen; N.D. Ill. Mar. 1994–Mar. 1998	Richard Paul Matsch; D. Colo. Mar. 1995–Mar. 1999	Thomas F. Hogan; D.D.C. Mar. 1996–Mar. 2000	Leonidas Ralph Mecham; Jul. 1985–Jul. 2006	Elizabeth Perris; D. Ore. Mar. 1993–Mar. 1997	
1997	William Rehnquist; Sep. 1986–Sep. 2005	Pasco Bowman II; 8th Cir. Mar. 1996–Mar. 1998	Bruce M. Selya; 1st Cir. Mar. 1995–Mar. 1999	Marvin Aspen; N.D. Ill. Mar. 1994–Mar. 1998	Richard Paul Matsch; D. Colo. Mar. 1995–Mar. 1999	Thomas F. Hogan; D.D.C. Mar. 1996–Mar. 2000	Leonidas Ralph Mecham; Jul. 1985–Jul. 2006	A. Thomas Small; E.D.N.C. Mar. 1997–Mar. 2001	Virginia M. Morgan; E.D. Mich. Mar. 1997–Mar. 2001
1998	William Rehnquist; Sep. 1986–Sep. 2005	Stanley Marcus; 11th Cir. Mar. 1998–Mar. 2002	Bruce M. Selya; 1st Cir. Mar. 1995–Mar. 1999	Jean Constance Hamilton; E.D. Mo. Mar. 1998–Mar. 2003	Richard Paul Matsch; D. Colo. Mar. 1995–Mar. 1999	Thomas F. Hogan; D.D.C. Mar. 1996–Mar. 2000	Leonidas Ralph Mecham; Jul. 1985–Jul. 2006	A. Thomas Small; E.D.N.C. Mar. 1997–Mar. 2001	Virginia M. Morgan; E.D. Mich. Mar. 1997–Mar. 2001
1999	William Rehnquist; Sep. 1986–Sep. 2005	Stanley Marcus; 11th Cir. Mar. 1998–Mar. 2002	Robert Manley Parker; 5th Cir. Mar. 1999–Mar. 2000	Jean Constance Hamilton; E.D. Mo. Mar. 1998–Mar. 2003	William H. Yohn Jr. E. D. Pa. Mar. 1999–Mar. 2003	Thomas F. Hogan; D.D.C. Mar. 1996–Mar. 2000	Leonidas Ralph Mecham; Jul. 1985–Jul. 2006	A. Thomas Small; E.D.N.C. Mar. 1997–Mar. 2001	Virginia M. Morgan; E.D. Mich. Mar. 1997–Mar. 2001
2000	William Rehnquist; Sep. 1986–Sep. 2005	Stanley Marcus; 11th Cir. Mar. 1998–Mar. 2002	Pauline Newman; Fed. Cir. Mar. 2000–Mar. 2004	Jean Constance Hamilton; E.D. Mo. Mar. 1998–Mar. 2003	William H. Yohn Jr. E. D. Pa. Mar. 1999–Mar. 2003	Robert Jensen Bryan; W.D. Wash. Mar. 2000–Mar. 2004	Leonidas Ralph Mecham; Jul. 1985–Jul. 2006	A. Thomas Small; E.D.N.C. Mar. 1997–Mar. 2001	Virginia M. Morgan; E.D. Mich. Mar. 1997–Mar. 2001
2001	William Rehnquist; Sep. 1986–Sep. 2005	Stanley Marcus; 11th Cir. Mar. 1998–Mar. 2002	Pauline Newman; Fed. Cir. Mar. 2000–Mar. 2004	Jean Constance Hamilton; E.D. Mo. Mar. 1998–Mar. 2003	William H. Yohn Jr. E. D. Pa. Mar. 1999–Mar. 2003	Robert Jensen Bryan; W.D. Wash. Mar. 2000–Mar. 2004	Leonidas Ralph Mecham; Jul. 1985–Jul. 2006	Robert F. Hershner Jr. M.D. Ga. Mar. 2001–Mar. 2005	Robert B. Collings; D. Mass. Mar. 2001–Mar. 2005
2002	William Rehnquist; Sep. 1986–Sep. 2005	Pierre N. Leval; 2nd Cir. Mar. 2002–Mar. 2006	Pauline Newman; Fed. Cir. Mar. 2000–Mar. 2004	Jean Constance Hamilton; E.D. Mo. Mar. 1998–Mar. 2003	William H. Yohn Jr. E. D. Pa. Mar. 1999–Mar. 2003	Robert Jensen Bryan; W.D. Wash. Mar. 2000–Mar. 2004	Leonidas Ralph Mecham; Jul. 1985–Jul. 2006	Robert F. Hershner Jr. M.D. Ga. Mar. 2001–Mar. 2005	Robert B. Collings; D. Mass. Mar. 2001–Mar. 2005
2003	William Rehnquist; Sep. 1986–Sep. 2005	Pierre N. Leval; 2nd Cir. Mar. 2002–Mar. 2006	Pauline Newman; Fed. Cir. Mar. 2000–Mar. 2004	Sarah S. Vance; E.D. La. Mar. 2003–Mar. 2007	James Aubrey Parker; D.N.M. Mar. 2003–Mar. 2007	Robert Jensen Bryan; W.D. Wash. Mar. 2000–Mar. 2004	Leonidas Ralph Mecham; Jul. 1985–Jul. 2006	Robert F. Hershner Jr. M.D. Ga. Mar. 2001–Mar. 2005	Robert B. Collings; D. Mass. Mar. 2001–Mar. 2005
2004	William Rehnquist; Sep. 1986–Sep. 2005	Pierre N. Leval; 2nd Cir. Mar. 2002–Mar. 2006	Terence T. Evans; 7th Cir. Mar. 2004–Mar. 2008	Sarah S. Vance; E.D. La. Mar. 2003–Mar. 2007	James Aubrey Parker; D.N.M. Mar. 2003–Mar. 2007	Bernice B. Donald; W.D. Tenn. Mar. 2004–Mar. 2008	Leonidas Ralph Mecham; Jul. 1985–Jul. 2006	Robert F. Hershner Jr. M.D. Ga. Mar. 2001–Mar. 2005	Robert B. Collings; D. Mass. Mar. 2001–Mar. 2005
2005	John Roberts; Sep. 2005–present	Pierre N. Leval; 2nd Cir. Mar. 2002–Mar. 2006	Terence T. Evans; 7th Cir. Mar. 2004–Mar. 2008	Sarah S. Vance; E.D. La. Mar. 2003–Mar. 2007	James Aubrey Parker; D.N.M. Mar. 2003–Mar. 2007	Bernice B. Donald; W.D. Tenn. Mar. 2004–Mar. 2008	Leonidas Ralph Mecham; Jul. 1985–Jul. 2006	Stephen Raslavich; E.D. Pa. Mar. 2005–Mar. 2009	Karen K. Klein; D.N.D. Mar. 2005–Mar. 2009
2006	John Roberts; Sep. 2005–present	Karen J. Williams; 4th Cir. Mar. 2006–Sep. 2007	Terence T. Evans; 7th Cir. Mar. 2004–Mar. 2008	Sarah S. Vance; E.D. La. Mar. 2003–Mar. 2007	James Aubrey Parker; D.N.M. Mar. 2003–Mar. 2007	Bernice B. Donald; W.D. Tenn. Mar. 2004–Mar. 2008	James C. Duff; Jul. 2006–Sep. 2011	Stephen Raslavich; E.D. Pa. Mar. 2005–Mar. 2009	Karen K. Klein; D.N.D. Mar. 2005–Mar. 2009
2007	John Roberts; Sep. 2005–present	William Byrd Traxler Jr. 4th Cir. Sep. 2007–Jul. 2009	Terence T. Evans; 7th Cir. Mar. 2004–Mar. 2008	Philip Martin Pro; D. Nev. Mar. 2007–Mar. 2011	David O. Carter; C.D. Cal. Mar. 2007–Mar. 2011	Bernice B. Donald; W.D. Tenn. Mar. 2004–Mar. 2008	James C. Duff; Jul. 2006–Sep. 2011	Stephen Raslavich; E.D. Pa. Mar. 2005–Mar. 2009	Karen K. Klein; D.N.D. Mar. 2005–Mar. 2009
2008	John Roberts; Sep. 2005–present	William Byrd Traxler Jr. 4th Cir. Sep. 2007–Jul. 2009	Susan H. Black; 11th Cir. Mar. 2008–Mar. 2012	Philip Martin Pro; D. Nev. Mar. 2007–Mar. 2011	David O. Carter; C.D. Cal. Mar. 2007–Mar. 2011	Loretta Preska; S.D.N.Y. Mar. 2008–Mar. 2012	James C. Duff; Jul. 2006–Sep. 2011	Stephen Raslavich; E.D. Pa. Mar. 2005–Mar. 2009	Karen K. Klein; D.N.D. Mar. 2005–Mar. 2009
2009	John Roberts; Sep. 2005–present	William Byrd Traxler Jr. 4th Cir. Sep. 2007–Jul. 2009	Susan H. Black; 11th Cir. Mar. 2008–Mar. 2012	Philip Martin Pro; D. Nev. Mar. 2007–Mar. 2011	David O. Carter; C.D. Cal. Mar. 2007–Mar. 2011	Loretta Preska; S.D.N.Y. Mar. 2008–Mar. 2012	James C. Duff; Jul. 2006–Sep. 2011	James B. Haines; D. Me. Mar. 2009–Mar. 2013	John M. Facciola; D.D.C. Mar. 2009–Mar. 2013
2010	John Roberts; Sep. 2005–present	Edward C. Prado; 5th Cir. Mar. 2010–Mar. 2014	Susan H. Black; 11th Cir. Mar. 2008–Mar. 2012	Philip Martin Pro; D. Nev. Mar. 2007–Mar. 2011	David O. Carter; C.D. Cal. Mar. 2007–Mar. 2011	Loretta Preska; S.D.N.Y. Mar. 2008–Mar. 2012	James C. Duff; Jul. 2006–Sep. 2011	James B. Haines; D. Me. Mar. 2009–Mar. 2013	John M. Facciola; D.D.C. Mar. 2009–Mar. 2013
2011	John Roberts; Sep. 2005–present	Edward C. Prado; 5th Cir. Mar. 2010–Mar. 2014	Susan H. Black; 11th Cir. Mar. 2008–Mar. 2012	Kathryn H. Vratil; D. Kan. Mar. 2011–Mar. 2015	James F. Holderman; N.D. Ill. Mar. 2011–Mar. 2015	Loretta Preska; S.D.N.Y. Mar. 2008–Mar. 2012	Thomas F. Hogan; D.D.C. Oct. 2011–Jul. 2013	James B. Haines; D. Me. Mar. 2009–Mar. 2013	John M. Facciola; D.D.C. Mar. 2009–Mar. 2013
2012	John Roberts; Sep. 2005–present	Edward C. Prado; 5th Cir. Mar. 2010–Mar. 2014	Michael Joseph Melloy; 8th Cir. Mar. 2012–Mar. 2016	Kathryn H. Vratil; D. Kan. Mar. 2011–Mar. 2015	James F. Holderman; N.D. Ill. Mar. 2011–Mar. 2015	Catherine C. Blake; D. Md. Mar. 2012–Mar. 2016	Thomas F. Hogan; D.D.C. Oct. 2011–Jul. 2013	James B. Haines; D. Me. Mar. 2009–Mar. 2013	John M. Facciola; D.D.C. Mar. 2009–Mar. 2013
2013	John Roberts; Sep. 2005–present	Edward C. Prado; 5th Cir. Mar. 2010–Mar. 2014	Michael Joseph Melloy; 8th Cir. Mar. 2012–Mar. 2016	Kathryn H. Vratil; D. Kan. Mar. 2011–Mar. 2015	James F. Holderman; N.D. Ill. Mar. 2011–Mar. 2015	Catherine C. Blake; D. Md. Mar. 2012–Mar. 2016	John D. Bates; D.D.C. Jul. 2013–Jan. 2015	C. Ray Mullins; N.D. Ga. Mar. 2013–Mar. 2017	Jonathan W. Feldman; W.D.N.Y. Mar. 2013–Mar. 2017
2014	John Roberts; Sep. 2005–present	Kent A. Jordan; 3rd Cir. Mar. 2014–Mar. 2018	Michael Joseph Melloy; 8th Cir. Mar. 2012–Mar. 2016	Kathryn H. Vratil; D. Kan. Mar. 2011–Mar. 2015	James F. Holderman; N.D. Ill. Mar. 2011–Mar. 2015	Catherine C. Blake; D. Md. Mar. 2012–Mar. 2016	John D. Bates; D.D.C. Jul. 2013–Jan. 2015	C. Ray Mullins; N.D. Ga. Mar. 2013–Mar. 2017	Jonathan W. Feldman; W.D.N.Y. Mar. 2013–Mar. 2017
2015	John Roberts; Sep. 2005–present	Kent A. Jordan; 3rd Cir. Mar. 2014–Mar. 2018	Michael Joseph Melloy; 8th Cir. Mar. 2012–Mar. 2016	Kimberly J. Mueller; E.D. Cal. Mar. 2015–Mar. 2019	Curtis Lynn Collier; E.D. Tenn. Mar. 2015–Mar. 2019	Catherine C. Blake; D. Md. Mar. 2012–Mar. 2016	James C. Duff; Jan. 2015–Feb. 2021	C. Ray Mullins; N.D. Ga. Mar. 2013–Mar. 2017	Jonathan W. Feldman; W.D.N.Y. Mar. 2013–Mar. 2017
2016	John Roberts; Sep. 2005–present	Kent A. Jordan; 3rd Cir. Mar. 2014–Mar. 2018	David S. Tatel; D.C. Cir. Mar. 2016–Mar. 2020	Kimberly J. Mueller; E.D. Cal. Mar. 2015–Mar. 2019	Curtis Lynn Collier; E.D. Tenn. Mar. 2015–Mar. 2019	George Z. Singal; D. Me. Mar. 2016–Mar. 2020	James C. Duff; Jan. 2015–Feb. 2021	C. Ray Mullins; N.D. Ga. Mar. 2013–Mar. 2017	Jonathan W. Feldman; W.D.N.Y. Mar. 2013–Mar. 2017
2017	John Roberts; Sep. 2005–present	Kent A. Jordan; 3rd Cir. Mar. 2014–Mar. 2018	David S. Tatel; D.C. Cir. Mar. 2016–Mar. 2020	Kimberly J. Mueller; E.D. Cal. Mar. 2015–Mar. 2019	Curtis Lynn Collier; E.D. Tenn. Mar. 2015–Mar. 2019	George Z. Singal; D. Me. Mar. 2016–Mar. 2020	James C. Duff; Jan. 2015–Feb. 2021	Barbara J. Houser; N.D. Tex. Mar. 2017–Apr. 2020	Tim A. Baker; S.D. Ind. Mar. 2017–Mar. 2021
2018	John Roberts; Sep. 2005–present	Duane Benton; 8th Cir. Mar. 2018–Mar. 2022	David S. Tatel; D.C. Cir. Mar. 2016–Mar. 2020	Kimberly J. Mueller; E.D. Cal. Mar. 2015–Mar. 2019	Curtis Lynn Collier; E.D. Tenn. Mar. 2015–Mar. 2019	George Z. Singal; D. Me. Mar. 2016–Mar. 2020	James C. Duff; Jan. 2015–Feb. 2021	Barbara J. Houser; N.D. Tex. Mar. 2017–Apr. 2020	Tim A. Baker; S.D. Ind. Mar. 2017–Mar. 2021
2019	John Roberts; Sep. 2005–present	Duane Benton; 8th Cir. Mar. 2018–Mar. 2022	David S. Tatel; D.C. Cir. Mar. 2016–Mar. 2020	Raymond Alvin Jackson; E.D. Va. Mar. 2019–Mar. 2023	Nancy D. Freudenthal; D. Wyo. Mar. 2019–Mar. 2023	George Z. Singal; D. Me. Mar. 2016–Mar. 2020	James C. Duff; Jan. 2015–Feb. 2021	Barbara J. Houser; N.D. Tex. Mar. 2017–Apr. 2020	Tim A. Baker; S.D. Ind. Mar. 2017–Mar. 2021
2020	John Roberts; Sep. 2005–present	Duane Benton; 8th Cir. Mar. 2018–Mar. 2022	Thomas Hardiman; 3rd Cir. Mar. 2020–Mar. 2024	Raymond Alvin Jackson; E.D. Va. Mar. 2019–Mar. 2023	Nancy D. Freudenthal; D. Wyo. Mar. 2019–Mar. 2023	Carol Amon; E.D.N.Y. Mar. 2020–Mar. 2024	James C. Duff; Jan. 2015–Feb. 2021	Barbara J. Houser; N.D. Tex. Mar. 2017–Apr. 2020	Tim A. Baker; S.D. Ind. Mar. 2017–Mar. 2021
2021	John Roberts; Sep. 2005–present	Duane Benton; 8th Cir. Mar. 2018–Mar. 2022	Thomas Hardiman; 3rd Cir. Mar. 2020–Mar. 2024	Raymond Alvin Jackson; E.D. Va. Mar. 2019–Mar. 2023	Nancy D. Freudenthal; D. Wyo. Mar. 2019–Mar. 2023	Carol Amon; E.D.N.Y. Mar. 2020–Mar. 2024	Roslynn R. Mauskopf; E.D.N.Y. Feb. 2021–Jan. 2024	Mildred Cabán; D.P.R. Mar. 2021–Mar. 2025	Anthony E. Porcelli; M.D. Fla. Mar. 2021–Mar. 2025
2022	John Roberts; Sep. 2005–present	R. Guy Cole Jr. 6th Cir. Mar. 2022–present	Thomas Hardiman; 3rd Cir. Mar. 2020–Mar. 2024	Raymond Alvin Jackson; E.D. Va. Mar. 2019–Mar. 2023	Nancy D. Freudenthal; D. Wyo. Mar. 2019–Mar. 2023	Carol Amon; E.D.N.Y. Mar. 2020–Mar. 2024	Roslynn R. Mauskopf; E.D.N.Y. Feb. 2021–Jan. 2024	Mildred Cabán; D.P.R. Mar. 2021–Mar. 2025	Anthony E. Porcelli; M.D. Fla. Mar. 2021–Mar. 2025
2023	John Roberts; Sep. 2005–present	R. Guy Cole Jr. 6th Cir. Mar. 2022–present	Thomas Hardiman; 3rd Cir. Mar. 2020–Mar. 2024	B. Lynn Winmill; D. Idaho; Mar. 2023–present	Sara L. Ellis; N.D. Ill. Mar. 2023–present	Carol Amon; E.D.N.Y. Mar. 2020–Mar. 2024	Roslynn R. Mauskopf; E.D.N.Y. Feb. 2021–Jan. 2024	Mildred Cabán; D.P.R. Mar. 2021–Mar. 2025	Anthony E. Porcelli; M.D. Fla. Mar. 2021–Mar. 2025
2024	John Roberts; Sep. 2005–present	R. Guy Cole Jr. 6th Cir. Mar. 2022–present	Ralph R. Erickson; 8th Cir. Mar. 2024–present	B. Lynn Winmill; D. Idaho; Mar. 2023–present	Sara L. Ellis; N.D. Ill. Mar. 2023–present	Kathleen Cardone; W.D. Tex. Mar. 2024–present	Robert J. Conrad; W.D.N.C. Mar. 2024–present	Mildred Cabán; D.P.R. Mar. 2021–Mar. 2025	Anthony E. Porcelli; M.D. Fla. Mar. 2021–Mar. 2025
2025	John Roberts; Sep. 2005–present	R. Guy Cole Jr. 6th Cir. Mar. 2022–present	Ralph R. Erickson; 8th Cir. Mar. 2024–present	B. Lynn Winmill; D. Idaho; Mar. 2023–present	Sara L. Ellis; N.D. Ill. Mar. 2023–present	Kathleen Cardone; W.D. Tex. Mar. 2024–present	Robert J. Conrad; W.D.N.C. Mar. 2024–present	Michelle M. Harner; D. Md. Mar. 2025–present	Suzanne Mitchell; W.D. Okla. Mar. 2025–present
