= Reggie Walton =

American judge (born 1949)

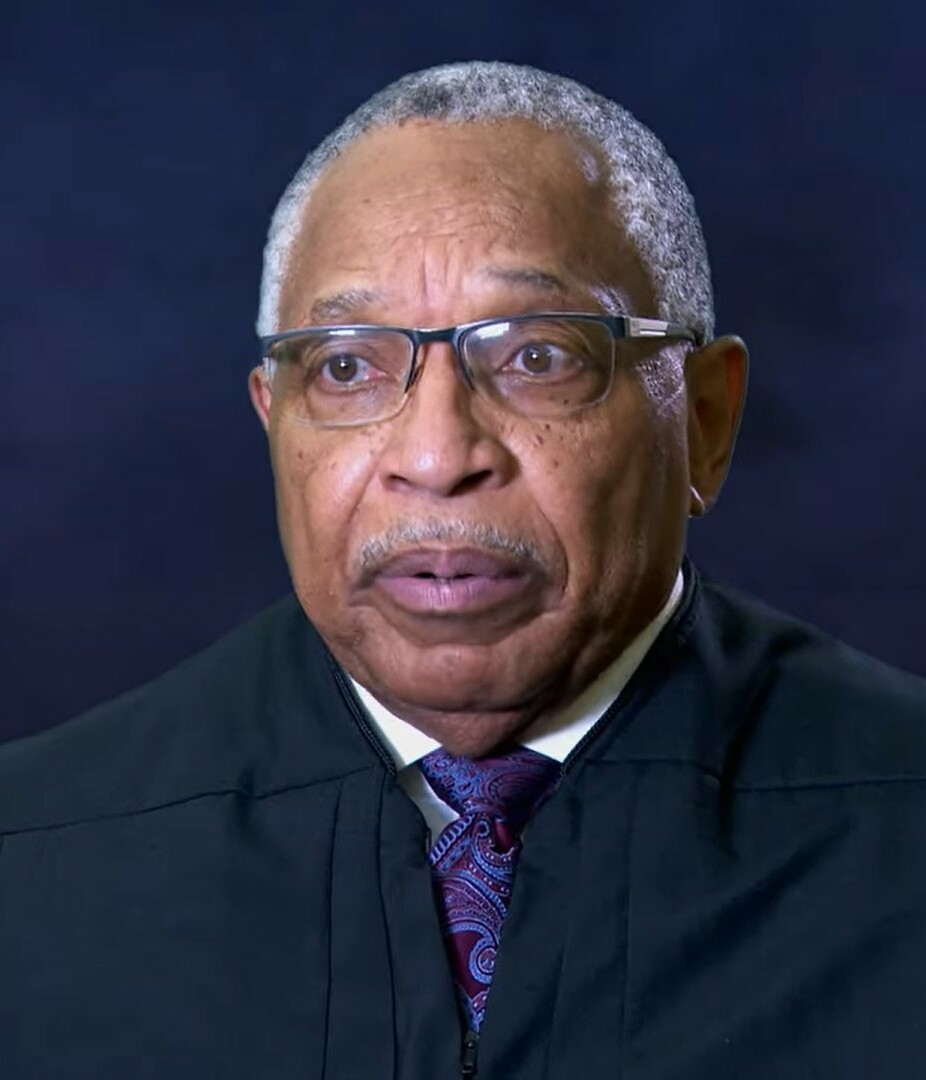
- Walton in 2021

Presiding Judge of the United States Foreign Intelligence Surveillance Court
- In office February 22, 2013 – May 19, 2014
- Preceded by: John D. Bates
- Succeeded by: Thomas F. Hogan

Judge of the United States Foreign Intelligence Surveillance Court
- In office May 19, 2007 – May 19, 2014
- Appointed by: John Roberts
- Preceded by: Claude M. Hilton
- Succeeded by: James Boasberg

Senior Judge of the United States District Court for the District of Columbia
- Incumbent
- Assumed office December 31, 2015

Judge of the United States District Court for the District of Columbia
- In office October 29, 2001 – December 31, 2015
- Appointed by: George W. Bush
- Preceded by: Stanley Sporkin
- Succeeded by: Dabney Friedrich

Associate Judge of the Superior Court of the District of Columbia
- In office 1991–2001
- Appointed by: George H. W. Bush
- Preceded by: Sylvia Bacon
- Succeeded by: Robert Rigsby
- In office 1981–1989
- Appointed by: Ronald Reagan
- Preceded by: Leonard Braman
- Succeeded by: Zinora Mitchell

Personal details
- Born: Reggie Barnett Walton; February 8, 1949 (age 77) North Charleroi, Pennsylvania, U.S.
- Education: West Virginia State University (BA); American University (JD)

Reggie Barnett Walton (born February 8, 1949) is a senior United States district judge of the United States District Court for the District of Columbia. He is a former presiding judge of the Foreign Intelligence Surveillance Court.

== Early life and education ==
Walton won a football scholarship to get his Bachelor of Arts degree from West Virginia State College in 1971, and then a Juris Doctor from the Washington College of Law at American University in 1974. Walton is a member of the Alpha Phi Alpha fraternity.

== Career ==
Walton served as an associate judge of the Superior Court of the District of Columbia from 1981 to 1989 and from 1991 to 2001. He also served as associate director of the Office of National Drug Control Policy.

=== Federal judicial service ===
In 2001, he was nominated to the federal bench by President George W. Bush, and subsequently confirmed by the United States Senate on September 21, 2001. He received his commission on September 24, 2001. In 2004, Bush appointed him to chair the National Prison Rape Elimination Commission, investigating ways to curb prison rape. In May 2007, Chief Justice John Roberts appointed him to a seat on the United States Foreign Intelligence Surveillance Court. His term on the FISA Court ended May 18, 2014. He assumed senior status on December 31, 2015.

During his FISC tenure, Judge Walton was "exceptionally concerned" about the NSA's "flagrant violation" of the court orders regarding privacy, and he accused the agency of "misinterpretations."

The Washington Post reported, "fellow judges and lawyers who appear before him say Walton's decisions do not appear to be guided by politics but by a tough-on-crime mentality." Walton is known by local defense attorneys as a "long ball hitter" – a judge willing to impose long sentences in order to deter future crimes. In fall 2005, the judge was driving his wife and daughter to the airport for a vacation when he came across an assailant attacking a cab driver on the side of the road. Walton tackled the assailant and subdued him until police arrived. The D.C. police spokesperson noted in response, "God bless Judge Walton. I surely wouldn't want to mess with him."

=== Notable cases ===
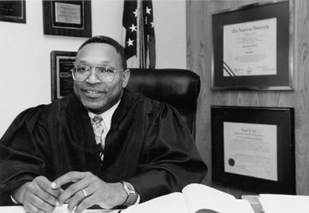
Walton in his office

==== United States v. Libby ====
Walton also presided over the trial of Vice President Dick Cheney's former chief of staff, Scooter Libby. On March 6, 2007, the jury convicted Libby of four of the five counts with which he was charged: two counts of perjury, one of obstruction of justice, and one of making false statements to federal investigators. On June 5, 2007, Walton sentenced Libby to 30 months in federal prison and a fine of US$250,000, and, subsequently, he ordered that Libby report to jail without bail pending any appeals. On June 20, 2007, Libby appealed Walton's ruling in federal appeals court. The next day, Walton filed a 30-page expanded ruling, in which he explained his decision to deny Libby bail in more detail.

Walton received several threatening letters after pronouncing sentence on Libby.

==== Rocket propellant case ====
Walton was the presiding judge in Tripoli Rocketry Association, Inc. and National Association of Rocketry v. United States Bureau of Alcohol, Tobacco, Firearms and Explosives, a long-running case brought by the two largest hobby rocketry organizations, which challenged the inclusion of certain types of solid fuel rocket propellant on the list of "explosives" regulated by the ATF. On March 16, 2009, Walton ruled in favor of the rocketry organizations.

==== United States v. Roger Clemens ====
On August 30, 2010, USA Today reported that Walton arraigned former major-league pitcher Roger Clemens on charges of lying to Congress (three counts of making false statements, two counts of perjury, and one count of obstruction of Congress) about the use of performance-enhancing substances. Pre-trial prosecutors brought a motion of conflict of interest against defense attorney Rusty Hardin for having briefly represented Andy Pettitte, who was an important witness for the government.

On July 14, 2011, Walton declared a mistrial over inadmissible evidence shown to jurors. The judge said Clemens could not be assured a fair trial after prosecutors showed jurors evidence against his orders in the second day of testimony. Following the mistrial, the US Attorneys Office brought Clemens to trial once more for perjury. On June 18, 2012, Judge Walton accepted the jury's unanimous verdict of acquittal.

==== Whitewater ====
On October 4, 2016, Walton rejected the release of Hillary Clinton criminal indictment drafts prosecutors prepared, but never issued, during the Whitewater investigation in the 1990s. He ruled that Clinton had a "substantial privacy interest" when he rejected a FOIA lawsuit filed by Judicial Watch.

==== Mohammon v. Bush ====
Walton presided over Mohammon v. Bush, a set of amalgamated habeas corpus petitions, submitted on behalf of Guantanamo captives.

==== Hatfill v. John Ashcroft et al. ====
Walton presided over the lawsuit that Steven Hatfill filed against former US Attorney General John Ashcroft. Ashcroft publicly described Hatfill as a "person of interest" in the FBI's investigations into the 2001 anthrax attacks. On March 30, 2007, Walton issued an order warning Hatfill that he may lose his lawsuit over the leaks if he did not compel journalists to name their sources and giving Hatfill until April 16, 2007, to decide whether to do so. Hatfill's lawyers complied with the order, as reported on April 18 by Gerstein, who warns that a "free press battle looms," as

The reporters in jeopardy now are expected to defy Hatfill's subpoenas and any court order to name their sources. ... one critical issue will be whether Judge Walton imposes fines on the news organizations involved. ... A First Amendment battle could possibly be avoided: The government and Dr. Hatfill's lawyers asked Walton to name a mediator to explore a possible settlement of the case. ... No one has been charged in the anthrax attacks, which killed at least five people.

==== Guantanamo captives' habeas petitions ====
On August 21, 2009, Reuters reported that Walton issued a ruling about "hearsay evidence" that applied to all the Guantanamo detainees' habeas petitions before him. Much of the evidence the Department of Justice presented in the habeas petitions was hearsay evidence.

Walton wrote:

Even the most widespread rumors are often inaccurate in part if not in whole. The court's only point is that otherwise unreliable hearsay cannot be deemed reliable because there is other unreliable hearsay to the same effect.

==== Mueller Report redactions ====
On August 5, 2019, Politico reported that while hearing arguments regarding lawsuits by BuzzFeed and the nonprofit Electronic Privacy Information Center, as they sought to reveal the approximately 1,000 redacted items in the publicly-released edition of former special counsel Robert Mueller's report, Walton indicated that he would review the redactions before determining whether to make them public.

On March 5, 2020, Walton described Attorney General William Barr's public statements about the Mueller report as "misleading," and said that Barr's representations regarding DOJ redactions from the report could not be credited. He directed the DOJ to submit the unredacted version of the Mueller Report to the Court for in camera review.

On October 6, 2020, President Trump, referencing the Mueller report, tweeted "I have fully authorized the total Declassification of any & all documents pertaining to the single greatest political CRIME in American History, the Russia Hoax". In response to the President's statement, BuzzFeed requested an unredacted version of the report; however, BuzzFeed's request was denied by the DOJ. The DOJ told Walton that "the President's statements on Twitter were not self-executing declassification orders..." To clear up the position of the President, Walton ordered a continuance until October 21, 2020 so, "I can get something from White House counsel saying that they conferred with the president, and the president, in fact, did not intend to declassify the information..."

==== United States v. Bergdahl ====
On July 25, 2023, the Associated Press reported that Walton vacated the sentence due to Judge Jeffery Nance's failure to report an application to the executive branch as an immigration judge; however, Judge Walton rejected the defense's claim of undue command influence due to Donald Trump's comments during his campaign in 2016. On September 1, 2026, a unanimous three-judge panel of the U.S. Court of Appeals for the District of Columbia vacated Walton's decision after noting that civilian courts lack authority to review court-martial convictions and that only military tribunals can set aside those convictions.

== See also ==
- List of African-American federal judges
- List of African-American jurists
- CIA leak grand jury investigation

Legal offices
Preceded by Stanley Sporkin	Judge of the United States District Court for the District of Columbia; 2001–2015	Succeeded by Dabney Friedrich
Preceded by Claude M. Hilton	Judge of the United States Foreign Intelligence Surveillance Court; 2007–2014	Succeeded by James Boasberg
Preceded by John D. Bates	Presiding Judge of the United States Foreign Intelligence Surveillance Court; 2013–2014	Succeeded by Thomas F. Hogan
