= Administrative Office of the United States Courts =

Administrative agency of the US federal court system

- Seal

Agency overview
- Formed: August 7, 1939
- Jurisdiction: United States Judiciary
- Headquarters: Thurgood Marshall Federal Judiciary Building Washington, D.C.
- Employees: ~30,000 (2020)
- Annual budget: $7.8 billion (FY 2021)
- Agency executives: Robert J. Conrad, Director
- Parent agency: Judicial Conference of the United States
- Website: www.uscourts.gov

The Administrative Office of the United States Courts (AO or AOUSC for short) is the administrative agency of the United States federal court system, established in 1939. The AO is the central support entity for the federal judicial branch, and it provides the federal court with a wide range of legislative (legislative assistance), administrative, legal, financial, management, program (program evaluation), and information technology support services.

The Judicial Conference of the United States directly supervises it. This body sets the national and legislative policy of the federal judiciary, and it is composed of the chief justice, the chief judge of each court of appeals, a district court judge from each regional judicial circuit, and the chief judge of the United States Court of International Trade. The AO implements and executes Judicial Conference policies, and applicable federal statutes and regulations. The office facilitates communications within the judiciary and with Congress, the executive branch, and the public on behalf of the judiciary. Administrative Office lawyers, public administrators, accountants, systems engineers, analysts, architects, statisticians, and other staff provide a wide variety of professional services to meet the needs of judges and more than 32,000 Judiciary employees working in more than 800 locations across the United States.

== Mission ==
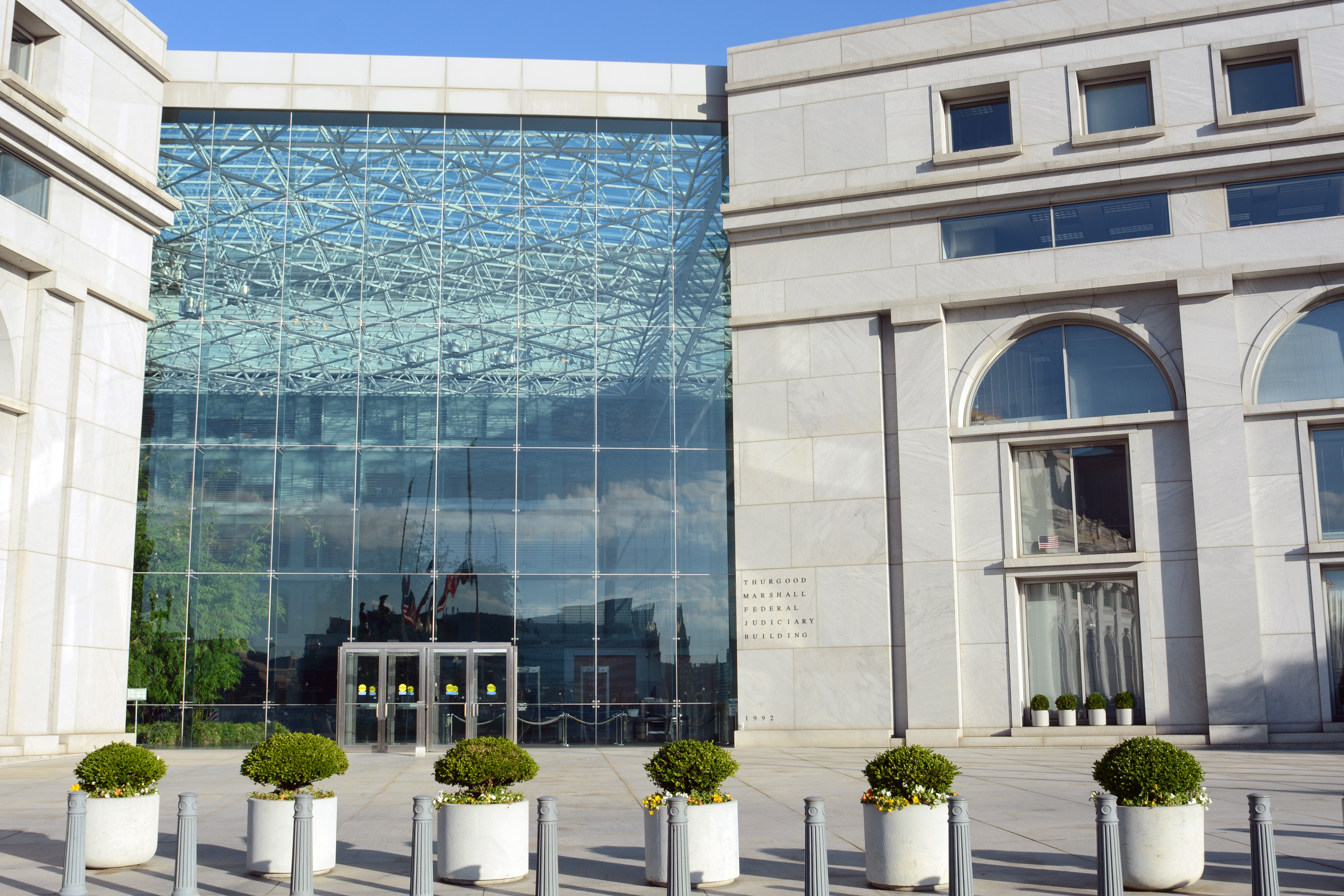
The Thurgood Marshall Federal Judiciary Building houses the offices of the Administrative Office of the United States Courts, the Federal Judicial Center, the United States Sentencing Commission, and the Office of the Clerk of the Judicial Panel on Multidistrict Litigation.

The mission of the Administrative Office of the United States Courts (AO) is to provide a variety of support functions to the United States federal judiciary. The AO prepares and submits the budget for the courts to the Judicial Conference for approval by Congress. It analyzes legislation from Congress that will affect the courts' operations or personnel and interprets and applies the new laws. It also provides administrative help to members of the courts in the form of clerks, probation and pretrial services officers, court reporters, and public defenders. It also works with the General Services Administration to develop and operate suitable accommodations for federal courts in federal buildings or standalone federal courthouses.

== Structure ==
The director of the AO (currently Robert J. Conrad) serves as Secretary of the Judicial Conference and is appointed, along with the deputy director (currently Lee Ann Bennett), by the chief justice of the United States. The AO includes an Office of the General Counsel, Office of Judicial Conference Executive Secretariat, Office of Public Affairs, Office of Legislative Affairs, Office of Judges Programs, Office of Court Administration, Office of Human Resources, Office of Finance and Budget, Office of Facilities and Security, Office of Defender Services, U.S. Probation and Pretrial Services System, Office of Information Technology, and an Office of Internal Services.

== History ==
An act of Congress established the Administrative Office of the U.S. Courts on November 6, 1939. With the establishment of the Administrative Office and the circuit judicial councils, Congress, for the first time, provided the judiciary with budgetary and personnel management agencies that were independent of the executive branch of government. For 150 years, administrative responsibility for the federal courts shifted from the Treasury Department to the Interior Department in 1849 and to the Justice Department in 1870. (The Conference of Senior Circuit Judges, established in 1922, was an advisory body.) By the late 1930s, a coalition of judges, lawyers, academics, and Justice Department officials agreed that the efficient administration of justice and the principle of judicial independence required a separate agency with officers appointed by and responsible to a body of judges.

By the early twentieth century, some judges expressed concern that the Justice Department's administrative oversight of the courts was ineffective and, more importantly, posed the threat of interference with the judicial process. Reform proposals ranged from separate appropriation bills for the courts to the authorization of senior circuit judges as administrators for all the courts within their respective circuits. Some circuits have established conferences for judges to discuss problems of case management and court administration. The Roosevelt administration's Judicial Reorganization Bill of 1937, best known for its provision to enlarge the Supreme Court, included the appointment of a proctor who would gather data on the business of the courts and make recommendations for the reassignment of judges and improved case management. Many district court judges resisted this centralization of authority over individual courts that had operated with so much autonomy for a century and a half; however, there was widespread support for some reform that would facilitate judicial business and eliminate the Justice Department's role in the daily operations of the federal courts.

After the defeat of Roosevelt's "court-packing" plan, Chief Justice Charles Evans Hughes responded to suggestions for less sweeping administrative changes. He appointed members of the Conference of Senior Circuit Judges to work with representatives of the American Bar Association and Justice Department officials to draft legislation that would improve the efficiency of the courts while respecting the decentralized character of the federal judicial system. The committee proposed that the Administrative Office of the U.S. Courts collect information on the court's caseload, prepare the annual budget request for the courts, disburse funds appropriated to the judiciary, and offer administrative assistance. The act authorized the Supreme Court to select the director of the Administrative Office. Still, at the insistence of Chief Justice Hughes, the office was to operate under the supervision of the Conference of Senior Circuit Judges rather than the Court. The committee proposal found broad support in both the Senate and House of Representatives, which considered several versions before passage in August 1939. The act established circuit judicial councils through which the courts of appeals judges would review the caseload reports of the Administrative Office and instruct district judges on what was necessary to expedite the courts' business. It also mandated annual circuit conferences where circuit and district judges would meet with the bar members to discuss judicial administration.

== Directors of the Administrative Office ==
In preparation for the planned retirement of Director Roslynn R. Mauskopf on January 31, 2024, Chief Justice John Roberts, on January 23, 2024, appointed Western District of NC senior judge Robert J. Conrad to be the next director of the Administrative Office of the United States Courts effective March 1, 2024. Deputy director Lee Ann Bennet served as acting director for the month of February.

=== Past directors ===
- Henry P. Chandler, 1939–1956
- Warren Olney III, 1958–1967
- Ernest C. Friesen, 1968–1970
- Rowland F. Kirks, 1970–1977
- William E. Foley, 1977–1985
- Leonidas Ralph Mecham, 1985–2006
- James C. Duff, 2006–2011
- Thomas F. Hogan, 2011–2013
- John D. Bates, 2013–2015
- James C. Duff, 2015–2021
- Roslynn R. Mauskopf, 2021–2024

== See also ==
- Judicial council (United States)
- California Administrative Office of the Courts
