= United States Foreign Intelligence Surveillance Court =

U.S. federal court

- (F.I.S.C.)
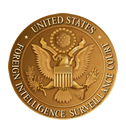
- Location: E. Barrett Prettyman U.S. Courthouse (Washington, D.C.)
- Appeals to: United States Foreign Intelligence Surveillance Court of Review
- Established: October 25, 1978
- Authority: Article III court
- Created by: Foreign Intelligence Surveillance Act; 50 U.S.C. §§ 1803–1805
- Composition method: Chief Justice appointment
- Judges: 11
- Judge term length: 7 years
- Presiding Judge: Carl J. Nichols
- www.fisc.uscourts.gov

The United States Foreign Intelligence Surveillance Court (FISC; also called the FISA Court) is a U.S. federal court established under the Foreign Intelligence Surveillance Act of 1978 (FISA) to oversee requests for surveillance warrants against foreign spies inside the United States by federal law enforcement and intelligence agencies.

FISA was created by the U.S. Congress based on the recommendations of the Senate's Church Committee, which was convened in 1975 to investigate illicit activities and civil rights abuses by the federal intelligence community. Pursuant to the law, the FISC reviews requests to conduct physical and electronic surveillance within the U.S. concerning "foreign intelligence information" between "foreign powers" and "agents of foreign powers" suspected of espionage or terrorism; such requests are made most often by the National Security Agency (NSA) and the Federal Bureau of Investigation (FBI).

From its opening in 1978 until 2009, the court was housed on the sixth floor of the Robert F. Kennedy Department of Justice Building. Since 2009, it has been relocated to the E. Barrett Prettyman United States Courthouse in Washington, D.C.

== Warrants ==
Each application for one of these surveillance warrants (called a FISA warrant) is made before an individual judge of the court. The court may allow third parties to submit briefs as amici curiae. When the United States Attorney General determines that an emergency exists, they may authorize the employment of electronic surveillance before obtaining the necessary authorization from the FISC, if the Attorney General or their designee notifies a judge of the court at the time of authorization and applies for a warrant as soon as practicable but not more than seven days after authorization of such surveillance, as required by 50 U.S.C. § 1805. If an application is denied by one judge of the court, the federal government is not allowed to make the same application to a different judge of the court but may appeal to the United States Foreign Intelligence Surveillance Court of Review.

Such appeals are rare: the first appeal from the FISC to the Court of Review was made in 2002 (In re Sealed Case No. 02-001), 24 years after the founding of the court. FISA warrant requests are rarely denied. During the 25 years from 1979 to 2004, 18,742 warrants were granted, while only four were rejected. Fewer than 200 requests had to be modified before being accepted, almost all of them in 2003 and 2004. The four rejected requests were all from 2003, and all four were partially granted after being submitted for reconsideration by the government. Of the requests that had to be modified, few were before the year 2000. During the next eight years, from 2004 to 2012, there were over 15,100 additional warrants granted, and another seven being rejected. Over the entire 33-year period, the FISA court granted 33,942 warrants, with only 12 denials – a rejection rate of 0.03 percent of the total requests. This does not include the number of warrants that were modified by the FISA court.

FISA warrant requests for electronic surveillance (Note: Excludes physical searches)
Year	# Requests submitted	# Requests approved	# Requests modified	# Requests denied
1979	199	207	0	0
1980	319	322	1	0
1981	431	433	0	0
1982	473	475	0	0
1983	549	549	0	0
1984	635	635	0	0
1985	587	587	0	0
1986	573	573	0	0
1987	512	512	0	0
1988	534	534	0	0
1989	546	546	0	0
1990	595	595	0	0
1991	593	593	0	0
1992	484	484	0	0
1993	509	509	0	0
1994	576	576	0	0
1995	697	697	0	0
1996	839	839	0	0
1997	749	748	0	0
1998	796	796	0	0
1999	886	880	0	0
2000	1,005	1,012	1	0
2001	932	934	4	0
2002	1,228	1,228	~~2~~ 0 (Note: Two modifications that were later reversed by the United States Foreign Intelligence Surveillance Court of Review, in a case entitled In re Sealed Case No. 02-001.)	0
2003	1,727	1,724	79	4 (Note: All four were later partially granted, after being submitted for reconsideration by the government.)
2004	1,758	1,754	94	0
2005	2,074	2,072	61	0
2006	2,181	2,176	73	1
2007	2,371	2,370	86	4
2008	2,082	2,083	2	1
2009	1,329	1,320	14	2
2010	1,511	1,506	14	0
2011	1,676	1,674	30	0
2012	1,789	1,788	40	0
2013	1,588	1,588	34	0
2014	1,379	1,379	19	0
2015	1,457	1,456	80	5
2016	1,485	1,451	310	34
2017	1,372	948	353	71
2018	1,142	830	245	67
2019	863	586	224	53
2020	489	334	121	34
2021	391	271	97	23
2022	358	249	87	23
2023	363	270	78	14
Totals	41,222	40,668	1,252	85

Notes:

On May 17, 2002, the court rebuffed Attorney General John Ashcroft, releasing an opinion that alleged that the FBI and Justice Department officials had "supplied erroneous information to the court" in more than 75 applications for search warrants and wiretaps, including one signed by FBI director Louis J. Freeh. Whether this rejection was related to the court starting to require modification of significantly more requests in 2003 is unknown. On December 16, 2005, The New York Times reported that the Bush administration had been conducting surveillance against U.S. citizens since 2002 without specific approval from the FISA court for each case.

On December 20, 2005, Judge James Robertson resigned his position on the court, apparently in protest of the secret surveillance, and later, in the wake of the Snowden leaks of 2013, criticized the court-sanctioned expansion of the scope of government surveillance and its being allowed to craft a secret body of law. The government's apparent circumvention of the court started prior to the increase in court-ordered modifications to warrant requests. In 2011, the Obama administration secretly won permission from the Court to reverse restrictions on the National Security Agency's use of intercepted phone calls and e-mails, permitting the agency to search deliberately for Americans' communications in its databases. The searches take place under a surveillance program Congress authorized in 2008, under section 702 of FISA (section 1881a of Title 50 of the United States Code).

Under section 702, the target must be a foreigner "reasonably believed" to be outside the United States, and the court must approve the targeting procedures in an order good for one year. But a warrant for each target would thus no longer be required. That means that communications with Americans could be picked up without a court first determining that there is probable cause that the people they were talking to were terrorists, spies or "foreign powers". The FISC also extended the length of time that the NSA is allowed to retain intercepted U.S. communications from five years to six years with an extension possible for foreign intelligence or counterintelligence purposes. Both measures were taken without public debate or any specific authority from Congress.

== Secrecy ==
Because of the sensitive nature of its business, the court is a "secret court" meaning its hearings are closed to the public. While records of the proceedings are kept, they also are unavailable to the public, although copies of some records with classified information redacted have been made public. Due to the classified nature of its proceedings, usually only attorneys licensed to practice in front of the US government are permitted to appear before the court. Because of the nature of the matters heard before it, court hearings may need to take place at any time of day or night, weekdays or weekends; thus, at least one judge must be "on call", at all times, to hear evidence and decide whether or not to issue a warrant. A heavily redacted version of a 2008 appeal by Yahoo! of an order issued with respect to NSA's PRISM program had been published for the edification of other potential appellants. The identity of the appellant was declassified in June 2013.

== Criticism ==
There has been growing criticism of the court since the September 11, 2001, attacks. This is partly because the court sits ex parte – in other words, in the absence of anyone but the judge and the government present at the hearings. This, combined with the minimal number of requests that are rejected by the court has led experts to characterize it as a rubber stamp (former National Security Agency analyst Russ Tice called it a "kangaroo court with a rubber stamp").

The accusation of being a "rubber stamp" was rejected by FISA Court president Reggie B. Walton who wrote in a letter to Senator Patrick J. Leahy: "The annual statistics provided to Congress by the Attorney General ... – frequently cited to in press reports as a suggestion that the Court's approval rate of application is over 99% – reflect only the number of final applications submitted to and acted on by the Court. These statistics do not reflect the fact that many applications are altered to prior or final submission or even withheld from final submission entirely, often after an indication that a judge would not approve them." He added: "There is a rigorous review process of applications submitted by the executive branch, spearheaded initially by five judicial branch lawyers who are national security experts and then by the judges, to ensure that the court's authorizations comport with what the applicable statutes authorize."

In a following letter Walton stated that the government had revamped 24.4% of its requests in the face of court questions and demands in time from July 1, 2013, to September 30, 2013. This figure became available after Walton decided in the summer of 2013 that the FISC would begin keeping its own tally of how Justice Department warrant applications for electronic surveillance fared – and would track for the first time when the government withdrew or resubmitted those applications with changes. Some requests are modified by the court but ultimately granted, while the percentage of denied requests is statistically negligible (11 denied requests out of around 34,000 granted in 35 years – equivalent to 0.03%).

The accusation that the FISC is a "rubber stamp" court was also rejected by Robert S. Litt (General Counsel of Office of the Director of National Intelligence): "When [the Government] prepares an application for [a section 215 order, it] first submit[s] to the [FISC] what's called a "read copy", which the court staff will review and comment on. [A]nd they will almost invariably come back with questions, concerns, problems that they see. And there is an iterative process back and forth between the Government and the [FISC] to take care of those concerns so that at the end of the day, we're confident that we're presenting something that the [FISC] will approve. That is hardly a rubber stamp. It's rather extensive and serious judicial oversight of this process."

A 2003 Senate Judiciary Committee Interim Report on FBI Oversight in the 107th Congress by the Senate Judiciary Committee: FISA Implementation Failures cited the "unnecessary secrecy" of the court among its "most important conclusions":

The secrecy of individual FISA cases is certainly necessary, but this secrecy has been extended to the most basic legal and procedural aspects of the FISA, which should not be secret. This unnecessary secrecy contributed to the deficiencies that have hamstrung the implementation of the FISA. Much more information, including all unclassified opinions and operating rules of the FISA Court and Court of Review, should be made public and/or provided to the Congress.

=== Allegations of bias ===
In a July 2013 interview, Senator and privacy advocate Ron Wyden described the FISC warrant process as "the most one-sided legal process in the United States". "I don't know of any other legal system or court that really doesn't highlight anything except one point of view", he said. Later in the interview he said Congress should seek to "diversify some of the thinking on the court".

Elizabeth Goitein, a co-director of the Liberty and National Security Program of the Brennan Center for Justice at the New York University School of Law, has criticized the court as being too compromised to be an impartial tribunal that oversees the work of the NSA and other U.S. intelligence activities. Since the court meets in secret, hears only the arguments of the government prior to deciding a case, and its rulings cannot be appealed or even reviewed by the public, she has argued that: "Like any other group that meets in secret behind closed doors with only one constituency appearing before them, they're subject to capture and bias."

A related bias of the court results from what critics such as Julian Sanchez, a scholar at the Cato Institute, have described as the near certainty of the polarization or groupthink of the judges of the court. Since all of the judges are appointed by the same person (the chief justice of the United States), hear no opposing testimony and feel no pressure from colleagues or the public to moderate their rulings, Sanchez claims that "group polarization is almost a certainty", adding that "there's the real possibility that these judges become more extreme over time, even when they had only a mild bias to begin with".

=== Appointment process ===
The court's judges are appointed solely by the chief justice of the United States without confirmation or oversight by the U.S. Congress. Some critics believe that this gives the chief justice the ability to appoint like-minded judges and create a court without diversity. "The judges are hand-picked by someone who, through his votes on the Supreme Court, we have come to learn has a particular view on civil liberties and law enforcement", Theodore Ruger, a professor at the University of Pennsylvania Law School, said with respect to Chief Justice John Roberts. "The way the FISA is set up, it gives him unchecked authority to put judges on the court who feel the same way he does." And Stephen Vladeck, a law professor at the University of Texas School of Law, added, "Since FISA was enacted in 1978, we've had three chief justices, and they have all been conservative Republicans, so I think one can worry that there is insufficient diversity." As of June 2024, eight of the eleven judges sitting on the FISA court were appointed to federal district courts by Republican presidents.

There are some reform proposals. Senator Richard Blumenthal from Connecticut proposed that each of the chief judges of the 12 major appeals courts select a district judge for the surveillance court; the chief justice would still pick the review panel that hears rare appeals of the court's decisions, but six other Supreme Court justices would have to sign off. Another proposal authored by Representative Adam Schiff of California would give the president the power to nominate judges for the court, subject to Senate approval, while Representative Steve Cohen proposed that Congressional leaders pick eight of the court's members.

=== Judicial and public oversight ===
Stephen Vladeck, a professor at the University of Texas School of Law, has argued that the U.S. Attorney General and the Director of National Intelligence can carry out broad surveillance programs for up to one year without court approval, since the court only reviews whether the required certifications meet legal standards, not the surveillance itself. There are procedures used by the NSA to target non-U.S. persons and procedures used by the NSA to minimize data collection from U.S. persons. These court-approved policies allow the NSA to do the following:

- keep data that could potentially contain details of U.S. persons for up to five years;
- retain and make use of "inadvertently acquired" domestic communications if they contain usable intelligence, information on criminal activity, threat of harm to people or property, are encrypted, or are believed to contain any information relevant to cybersecurity;
- preserve "foreign intelligence information" contained within attorney–client communications; and
- access the content of communications gathered from "U.S. based machine[s]" or phone numbers in order to establish if targets are located in the U.S., for the purposes of ceasing further surveillance.

Jameel Jaffer, the ACLU's deputy legal director, said in light of revelations that the government secured telephone records from Verizon and Internet data from some of the largest providers that safeguards that are supposed to be protecting individual privacy are not working. Elizabeth Goitein, co-director of the Liberty and National Security Program at the Brennan Center for Justice in New York, wrote in the Wall Street Journal that when courts make mistakes, the losing party has the right to appeal and the erroneous decision is reversed. "That process cannot happen when a secret court considers a case with only one party before it."

According to The Guardian, "The broad scope of the court orders, and the nature of the procedures set out in the documents, appear to clash with assurances from President Obama and senior intelligence officials that the NSA could not access Americans' call or email information without warrants". Glenn Greenwald, who published details of the PRISM surveillance program, argued that the Foreign Intelligence Surveillance Court’s oversight of NSA surveillance is largely formal and does not involve meaningful monitoring of the agency’s targeting decisions. He said the court approves broad surveillance procedures and guidelines without reviewing specific targets, leaving decisions about who is monitored largely to NSA analysts. According to Greenwald, compliance is overseen mainly by executive branch agencies rather than through ongoing, independent judicial review.

Deputy Attorney General James M. Cole and NSA Deputy Director John C. Inglis cited the court's oversight in defending the constitutionality of the NSA's surveillance activities before during a hearing before the House Judiciary Committee in July 2013. Representative Jerrold Nadler, challenged Cole's defense of the program's constitutionality, and he said the secrecy in which the court functioned negated the validity of its review. "The fact that a secret court unaccountable to public knowledge of what it's doing ... may join you in misusing or abusing the statutes is of no comfort whatsoever", Nadler said. Orin Kerr, a law professor at George Washington University, said the secrecy that comes along with national security makes it difficult to evaluate how the administration carries out the wide authority Congress has given it. "FISA court judges hear all of this and they think it's legal," Kerr said. "What we really don't know, though, are what the FISA court's opinions say."

=== Secret law ===
In July 2013, The New York Times published disclosures from anonymous government whistleblowers of secret law written by the court holding that vast collections of data on all Americans (even those not connected in any way to foreign enemies) amassed by the NSA do not violate the warrant requirements of Fourth Amendment to the U.S. Constitution. It reported that anyone suspected of being involved in nuclear proliferation, espionage or cyber-attacks, according to the court, may be considered a legitimate target for warrantless surveillance. Acting like a parallel U.S. Supreme Court, the court greatly broadened the "special-needs" exception to do so.

The newspaper reported that in "more than a dozen classified rulings, the nation's surveillance court has created a secret body of law giving the National Security Agency the power to amass vast collections of data on Americans". (Note: The phrase "secret law written by the court" is a little misleading, because the distinction between "creating" a body of law rather than "writing" is important, since courts do not have the authority to write law, even if the end result is very close to the same.) It also wrote, with respect to the court:

In one of the court's most important decisions, the judges have expanded the use in terrorism cases of a legal principle known as the 'special needs' doctrine and carved out an exception to the Fourth Amendment's requirement of a warrant for searches and seizures ... The special needs doctrine was originally established in 1989 by the Supreme Court in a ruling allowing the drug testing of railway workers, finding that a minimal intrusion on privacy was justified by the government's need to combat an overriding public danger. Applying that concept more broadly, the FISA judges have ruled that the N.S.A.'s collection and examination of Americans' communications data to track possible terrorists does not run afoul of the Fourth Amendment, the officials said. That legal interpretation is significant, several outside legal experts said, because it uses a relatively narrow area of the law – used to justify airport screenings, for instance, or drunken-driving checkpoints – and applies it much more broadly, in secret, to the wholesale collection of communications in pursuit of terrorism suspects.

The "special-needs" doctrine is an exemption to the Fourth Amendment's Warrants Clause which commands that "no Warrants shall issue, but upon probable cause, supported by Oath or affirmation, and particularly describing the place to be searched, and the persons or things to be and seized". The U.S. Supreme Court has recognized an exemption to the Warrants Clause "outside the foreign intelligence context, in so-called 'special-needs' cases. In those cases, the Court excused compliance with the Warrant Clause when the purpose behind the governmental action went beyond routine law enforcement and insisting upon a warrant would materially interfere with the accomplishment of that purpose. See, Vernonia School District 47J v. Acton, 515 U.S. 646, 653 (1995) (upholding drug testing of highschool athletes and explaining that the exception to the warrant requirement applied "when special needs, beyond the normal need for law enforcement, make the warrant and probable-cause requirement[s] impracticable (quoting Griffin v. Wisconsin, 483 U.S. 868, 873 (1987))); Skinner v. Ry. Labor Execs. Ass'n, 489 U.S. 602, 620 (1989) (upholding regulations instituting drug and alcohol testing of railroad workers for safety reasons); cf. Terry v. Ohio, 392 U.S. 1, 23-24 (1968) (upholding pat-frisk for weapons to protect officer safety during investigatory stop)". The U.S. Foreign Intelligence Surveillance Court of Review concluded on August 22, 2008, in the case In re Directives [redacted text] Pursuant to Section 105B of the Foreign Intelligence Surveillance Act, that the "special-needs" doctrine applied by analogy to justify a foreign intelligence exception to the warrant requirement for surveillance undertaken for national security purposes and directed at a foreign power or an agent of a foreign power reasonably believed to be located outside the U.S.

James Robertson – a former judge for the U.S. District Court for the District of Columbia, who, in 2004, ruled against the Bush administration in the Hamdan v. Rumsfeld case, and also served on the FISC for three years between 2002 and 2005 – said he was "frankly stunned" by the newspaper's report that court rulings had created a new body of law broadening the ability of the NSA to use its surveillance programs to target not only terrorists but suspects in cases involving espionage, cyberattacks and weapons of mass destruction. Geoffrey R. Stone, a professor of constitutional law at the University of Chicago, said he was troubled by the idea that the court is creating a significant body of law without hearing from anyone outside the government, forgoing the adversarial system that is a staple of the American justice system. He said, "That whole notion is missing in this process".

The court concluded that mass collection of telephone metadata (including the time of phone calls and numbers dialed) does not violate the Fourth Amendment as long as the government establishes a valid reason under national security regulations before taking the next step of actually examining the contents of an American's communications. This concept is rooted partly in the special needs doctrine. "The basic idea is that it's O.K. to create this huge pond of data", an unnamed U.S. official said, "but you have to establish a reason to stick your pole in the water and start fishing". Under the new procedures passed by the U.S. Congress in the FISA Amendments Act of 2008, even the collection of metadata must be considered "relevant" to a terrorism investigation or other intelligence activities. The court has indicated that while individual pieces of data may not appear "relevant" to a terrorism investigation, the total picture that the bits of data create may in fact be relevant, according to U.S. officials with knowledge of the decisions.

A secret ruling made by the court that redefined the single word "relevant" enabled the NSA to gather phone data on millions of Americans. In classified orders starting in the mid-2000s, the court accepted that "relevant" could be broadened to permit an entire database of records on millions of people, in contrast to a more conservative interpretation widely applied in criminal cases, in which only some of those records would likely be allowed. Under the Patriot Act, the Federal Bureau of Investigation can require businesses to hand over "tangible things", including "records", as long as the FBI shows it is reasonable to believe the things are "relevant to an authorized investigation" into international terrorism or foreign intelligence activities. The history of the word "relevant" is key to understanding that passage. The Supreme Court in 1991 said things are "relevant" if there is a "reasonable possibility" that they will produce information related to the subject of the investigation. In criminal cases, courts previously have found that very large sets of information did not meet the relevance standard because significant portions – innocent people's information – would not be pertinent. But the court has developed separate precedents, centered on the idea that investigations to prevent national-security threats are different from ordinary criminal cases. The court's rulings on such matters are classified and almost impossible to challenge because of the secret nature of the proceedings. According to the court, the special nature of national-security and terrorism-prevention cases means "relevant" can have a broader meaning for those investigations, say people familiar with the rulings.

People familiar with the system that uses phone records in investigations have said that the court's novel legal theories allow the system to include bulk phone records, as long as there are privacy safeguards to limit searches. NSA analysts may query the database only "when there is a reasonable suspicion, based on specific facts, that the particular basis for the query is associated with a foreign terrorist organization", according to Director of National Intelligence James Clapper. The NSA database includes data about people's phone calls – numbers dialed, how long a call lasted – but not the actual conversations. According to Supreme Court rulings, a phone call's content is covered by the Constitution's Fourth Amendment, which restricts unreasonable searches, but the other types of data are not.

"Relevant" has long been a broad standard, but the way the court is interpreting it, to mean, in effect, "everything", is new, said Mark Eckenwiler, a lawyer who until December 2012 was the Justice Department's primary authority on federal criminal surveillance law. "I think it's a stretch" of previous federal legal interpretations, said Eckenwiler. If a federal attorney "served a grand-jury subpoena for such a broad class of records in a criminal investigation, he or she would be laughed out of court". Given the traditional legal definition of relevant, Timothy Edgar, a former top privacy lawyer at the Office of the Director of National Intelligence and the National Security Council in the Bush and Obama administrations, noted it is "a fair point" to say that someone reading the law might believe it refers to "individualized requests" or "requests in small batches, rather than in bulk database form". From that standpoint, Edgar said, the reinterpretation of relevant amounts to "secret law".

== Controversies ==
=== 2013 NSA controversy ===
In June 2013, a copy of a top-secret warrant, issued by the court on April 25, 2013, was leaked to London's The Guardian newspaper by NSA contractor Edward Snowden. That warrant orders Verizon Business Network Services to provide a daily feed to the NSA containing "telephony metadata" – comprehensive call detail records, including location data – about all calls in its system, including those that occur "wholly within the United States, including local telephone calls". The Obama administration published on July 31, 2013 a FISA Court ruling supporting an earlier order requiring a Verizon subsidiary to turn over all of its customers' phone logs for a three-month period, with rules that must be followed when accessing the data.

The document leaked to The Guardian acted as a "smoking gun" and sparked a public outcry of criticism and complaints that the court exceeded its authority and violated the Fourth Amendment by issuing general warrants. The Washington Post then reported that it knew of other orders, and that the court had been issuing such orders, to all telecommunication companies, every three months since May 24, 2006.

Since the telephone metadata program was revealed, the intelligence community, some members of Congress, and the Obama administration have defended its legality and use. Most of these defenses involve the 1979 Supreme Court decision Smith v. Maryland which established that people do not have a "reasonable expectation" of privacy for electronic metadata held by third parties like a cellphone provider. That data is not considered "content", theoretically giving law enforcement more flexibility in collecting it.

On July 19, 2013, the court renewed the permission for the NSA to collect Verizon customer records en masse. The U.S. government was relying on a part of the third-party doctrine. This notion said that when a person has voluntarily disclosed information to a third party – in this case, the telephony metadata – the customer no longer has a reasonable expectation of privacy over the numbers dialed nor their duration. Therefore, this doctrine argued, such metadata can be accessed by law enforcement with essentially no problem. The content of communications are, however, subject to the Fourth Amendment. The Foreign Intelligence Surveillance Court held in October 2011, citing multiple Supreme Court precedents, that the Fourth Amendment prohibition against unreasonable searches and seizures applies to the contents of all communications, whatever the means, because "a person's private communications are akin to personal papers".

Former FISC judge Colleen Kollar-Kotelly, who provided the legal foundation for the NSA amassing a database of all Americans' phone records, told associates in the summer of 2013 that she wanted her legal argument out. Rulings for the plaintiff in cases brought by the ACLU on September 10 and 12, 2013, prompted James Clapper to concede that the government had overreached in its covert surveillance under part 215 of FISA and that the Act would likely be amended to reflect Congressional concern.

The American Civil Liberties Union, a customer of Verizon, asked on November 22, 2013, a federal district court in Lower Manhattan, New York to end the NSA phone call data collection program. The ACLU argued that the program violated the U.S. Constitution's guarantees of privacy and information as well as exceeding the scope of its authorizing legislation, Section 215 of the Patriot Act. The U.S. government countered that the program is constitutional and that Congress was fully informed when it authorized and reauthorized Section 215. Moreover, a government lawyer said, the ACLU has no standing to bring the case because it cannot prove that its members have been harmed by the NSA's use of the data.

=== 2016 presidential election controversy ===
In November 2016, Louise Mensch reported on the news website Heat Street that, after an initial June 2016 FBI request was denied, the FISA court had granted a more narrowly focused October request from the FBI "to examine the activities of 'U.S. persons' in Donald Trump's campaign with ties to Russia". On 12 January 2017, BBC journalist Paul Wood reported that, in response to an April 2016 tip from a foreign intelligence agency to the CIA about "money from the Kremlin going into the US presidential campaign", a joint taskforce had been established including representatives of the FBI, the Department of the Treasury, the Department of Justice, the CIA, the Office of the Director of National Intelligence and the National Security Agency. In June 2016, lawyers from the Department of Justice applied to the FISA court for "permission to intercept the electronic records from two Russian banks". According to Wood, this application was rejected, as was a more narrowly focused request in July, and the order was finally granted by a different FISA judge on 15 October, three weeks before the presidential election. On January 19, The New York Times reported that one of its sources had claimed "intelligence reports based on some of the wiretapped communications had been provided to the White House".

On 13 March, the Senate Intelligence Committee demanded that the Trump administration provide evidence to support the President Trump's claim that former President Obama had wiretapped Trump Tower. On 16 March, the Committee reported that they had seen no evidence to support Trump's accusation that the Obama administration tapped his phones during the 2016 presidential campaign. On Fox News on 14 March, commentator Andrew Napolitano said, "Three intelligence sources have informed Fox News that President Obama went outside the chain of command. ... He used GCHQ. What is that? It's the initials for the British intelligence spying agency. Simply by saying to them, 'The president needs transcripts of conversations involving candidate Trump's conversations' he's able to get it and there's no American fingerprints on this." Two days later, on 16 March, White House press spokesperson, Sean Spicer, read this claim to the press. A GCHQ spokesman responded: "Recent allegations made by media commentator Judge Andrew Napolitano about GCHQ being asked to conduct 'wiretapping' against the then president elect are nonsense. They are utterly ridiculous and should be ignored." On 17 March, the U.S. issued a formal apology to the United Kingdom for the accusation.

On April 11, The Washington Post reported that the FBI had been granted a FISA warrant in the summer of 2016 to monitor then-Trump foreign policy adviser Carter Page. According to the report, "The FBI and the Justice Department obtained the warrant targeting Carter Page's communications after convincing a Foreign Intelligence Surveillance Court judge that there was probable cause to believe Page was acting as an agent of a foreign power, in this case Russia, according to the officials." The report also states that the warrant has been renewed multiple times since its first issue. These warrants were criticized in the controversial Nunes memo for allegedly being issued on the basis of evidence gathered by politically motivated sources.

== Composition ==
When the court was founded, it was composed of seven federal district judges appointed by the Chief Justice of the United States, each serving a seven-year term, with one judge being appointed each year. In 2001, the USA PATRIOT Act expanded the court from seven to eleven judges, and required that at least three of the Court's judges live within twenty miles (32 km) of the District of Columbia. No judge may be appointed to this court more than once, and no judge may be appointed to both the Court of Review and the FISA court. Chief Justice John Roberts has appointed all of the current judges.

=== Membership ===
As of 19 May 2026.

Name	Court	Start	End	Presiding Start	Presiding End	FISC Appointer (Chief Justice)	Original Appointer (President)
Carl J. Nichols	D.D.C.	March 11, 2024	May 18, 2030	May 19, 2026	present	John Roberts	Donald Trump
John Robert Blakey	N.D. Ill.	July 10, 2025	May 18, 2032	–	–	John Roberts	Barack Obama
Timothy D. DeGiusti	W.D. Okla.	May 19, 2023	May 18, 2030	–	–	John Roberts	George W. Bush
Joan N. Ericksen	D. Minn.	April 3, 2023	May 18, 2029	–	–	John Roberts	George W. Bush
Karin Immergut	D. Ore.	May 19, 2024	May 18, 2031	–	–	John Roberts	Donald Trump
Kenneth M. Karas	S.D.N.Y.	May 23, 2022	May 18, 2029	–	–	John Roberts	George W. Bush
Sara Elizabeth Lioi	N.D. Ohio	May 19, 2023	May 18, 2030	–	–	John Roberts	George W. Bush
Amit Mehta	D.D.C.	June 1, 2021	May 18, 2028	–	–	John Roberts	Barack Obama
James E. Kinkeade	N.D. Tex.	May 19, 2026	May 18, 2033	–	–	John Roberts	George W. Bush
Michael S. Nachmanoff	E.D. Va.	May 19, 2026	May 18, 2033	–	–	John Roberts	Joe Biden
David J. Novak	E.D. Va.	May 19, 2026	May 18, 2033	–	–	John Roberts	Donald Trump

=== Former members ===
Note that the start dates of service for some judges conflict among sources.

Name	Court	Start	End	Presiding Start	Presiding End	FISC Appointer (Chief Justice)	Original Appointer (President)
Sidney Aronovitz	S.D. Fla.	June 8, 1989	May 18, 1992	–	–	William Rehnquist	Gerald Ford
Harold Baker	C.D. Ill.	May 19, 1998	May 18, 2005	–	–	William Rehnquist	Jimmy Carter
John D. Bates	D. D.C.	February 22, 2006	February 21, 2013	May 19, 2009	February 21, 2013	John Roberts	George W. Bush
Dee Benson	D. Utah	April 8, 2004	April 7, 2011	–	–	William Rehnquist	George H. W. Bush
James Boasberg	D. D.C.	May 19, 2014	May 18, 2021	January 20, 2020	May 18, 2021	John Roberts	George W. Bush
Dudley Baldwin Bonsal	S.D. N.Y.	December 2, 1981	May 18, 1984	–	–	Warren Burger	John F. Kennedy
Robert C. Broomfield	D. Ariz.	October 1, 2002	May 18, 2009	–	–	William Rehnquist	Ronald Reagan
Stanley Brotman	D. N.J.	July 17, 1997	May 18, 2004	–	–	William Rehnquist	Gerald Ford
Albert Vickers Bryan Jr.	E.D. Va.	May 19, 1979	May 18, 1986	–	–	Warren Burger	Richard Nixon
James Cacheris	E.D. Va.	September 10, 1993	May 18, 2000	–	–	William Rehnquist	Ronald Reagan
James G. Carr	N.D. Ohio	May 19, 2002	May 18, 2008	–	–	William Rehnquist	Bill Clinton
Earl H. Carroll	D. Ariz.	February 2, 1993	May 18, 1999	–	–	William Rehnquist	Jimmy Carter
Jennifer B. Coffman	E.D. Ky.	May 19, 2011	January 8, 2013	–	–	John Roberts	Bill Clinton
Rosemary M. Collyer	D. D.C.	March 8, 2013	March 7, 2020	May 19, 2016	December 31, 2019	John Roberts	George W. Bush
Rudolph Contreras	D. D.C.	May 19, 2016	May 18, 2023	May 19, 2021	May 18, 2023	John Roberts	Barack Obama
Anne C. Conway	M.D. Fla.	May 19, 2016	May 18, 2023	–	–	John Roberts	George H. W. Bush
John Edwards Conway	D. N.M.	May 19, 2002	October 30, 2003	–	–	William Rehnquist	Ronald Reagan
Conrad K. Cyr	D. Me.	May 19, 1987	November 20, 1989	–	–	William Rehnquist	Ronald Reagan
Frederick Alvin Daugherty	N.D. Okla.	May 19, 1981	May 18, 1988	–	–	Warren Burger	John F. Kennedy
Michael J. Davis	D. Minn.	May 19, 1999	May 18, 2006	–	–	William Rehnquist	Bill Clinton
Raymond Dearie	E.D. N.Y.	July 2, 2012	July 1, 2019	–	–	John Roberts	Ronald Reagan
Edward Devitt	D. Minn	January 11, 1985	March 2, 1992	–	–	Warren Burger	Dwight Eisenhower
Claire Eagan	N.D. Okla.	February 13, 2013	May 18, 2019	–	–	John Roberts	George W. Bush
Martin Leach-Cross Feldman	E.D. La.	May 19, 2010	May 18, 2017	–	–	John Roberts	Ronald Reagan
Frank Harlan Freedman	D. Mass.	May 30, 1990	May 18, 1994	–	–	William Rehnquist	Richard Nixon
Nathaniel M. Gorton	D. Mass.	May 19, 2001	May 18, 2008	–	–	William Rehnquist	George H. W. Bush
Joyce Hens Green	D. D.C.	May 19, 1988	May 18, 1995	May 19, 1990	May 18, 1995	William Rehnquist	Jimmy Carter
Louis Guirola Jr.	S.D. Miss.	July 2, 2019	May 18, 2026	-	-	John Roberts	George W. Bush
George Luzerne Hart Jr.	D. D.C.	May 19, 1979	May 18, 1982	May 19, 1979	May 18, 1982	Warren Burger	Dwight Eisenhower
Claude M. Hilton	E.D. Va.	May 19, 2000	May 18, 2007	–	–	William Rehnquist	Ronald Reagan
Thomas F. Hogan	D. D.C.	May 19, 2009	May 18, 2016	May 19, 2014	May 18, 2016	John Roberts	Ronald Reagan
Malcolm Jones Howard	E.D. N.C.	May 19, 2005	January 8, 2012	–	–	William Rehnquist	Ronald Reagan
James Parker Jones	W.D. Va.	May 19, 2015	May 18, 2022	–	–	John Roberts	Bill Clinton
George P. Kazen	S.D. Tex.	July 15, 2003	May 18, 2010	–	–	William Rehnquist	Jimmy Carter
John F. Keenan	S.D. N.Y.	July 24, 1994	May 18, 2001	–	–	William Rehnquist	Ronald Reagan
Colleen Kollar-Kotelly	D. D.C.	May 19, 2002	May 18, 2009	May 19, 2002	May 18, 2009	William Rehnquist	Bill Clinton
Robert B. Kugler	D. N.J.	May 19, 2017	May 18, 2024	–	–	John Roberts	George W. Bush
Frederick Bernard Lacey	D. N.J..	May 19, 1979	May 18, 1985	–	–	Warren Burger	Richard Nixon
Royce Lamberth	D. D.C.	May 19, 1995	May 18, 2002	May 19, 1995	May 18, 2002	William Rehnquist	Ronald Reagan
Thomas Jamison MacBride	E.D. Cal.	May 19, 1979	May 18, 1980	–	–	Warren Burger	John F. Kennedy
Lloyd Francis MacMahon	S.D. N.Y.	July 5, 1985	April 8, 1989	–	–	Warren Burger	Dwight Eisenhower
Frank James McGarr	N.D. Ill.	May 19, 1979	May 18, 1983	–	–	Warren Burger	Richard Nixon
Mary A. McLaughlin	E.D. Pa.	May 19, 2008	May 18, 2015	–	–	John Roberts	Bill Clinton
James Hargrove Meredith	E.D. Mo.	May 19, 1979	May 18, 1981	–	–	Warren Burger	John F. Kennedy
Wendell Alverson Miles	W.D. Mich.	September 21, 1989	May 18, 1996	–	–	William Rehnquist	Richard Nixon
Michael W. Mosman	D. Ore.	May 4, 2013	May 3, 2020	–	–	John Roberts	George W. Bush
Herbert Frazier Murray	D. Md.	May 19, 1986	May 18, 1993	–	–	Warren Burger	Richard Nixon
James Ellsworth Noland	S.D. Ind.	May 19, 1983	May 18, 1990	May 19, 1988	May 18, 1990	Warren Burger (as Judge)	Lyndon Johnson
James Ellsworth Noland	S.D. Ind.	May 19, 1983	May 18, 1990	May 19, 1988	May 18, 1990	William Rehnquist (as Presiding)	Lyndon Johnson
Liam O'Grady	E.D. Va.	August 21, 2020	August 18, 2023	–	–	John Roberts	George W. Bush
William Clark O'Kelley	N.D. Ga.	May 19, 1980	May 18, 1987	–	–	Warren Burger	Richard Nixon
Lawrence W. Pierce	D. D.C.	May 19, 1979	January 1, 1981	–	–	Warren Burger	Richard Nixon
James Robertson	D. D.C.	May 19, 2002	December 19, 2008	–	–	William Rehnquist	Bill Clinton
Thomas B. Russell	W.D. Ky.	May 19, 2015	May 18, 2022	–	–	John Roberts	Bill Clinton
F. Dennis Saylor IV	D. Mass.	May 19, 2011	May 18, 2018	–	–	John Roberts	George W. Bush
Charles Schwartz Jr.	E.D. La.	August 5, 1992	May 18, 1999	–	–	William Rehnquist	Gerald Ford
Frederick Scullin	N.D. N.Y.	May 19, 2004	January 8, 2011	–	–	William Rehnquist	George H. W. Bush
George Z. Singal	D. Me.	May 19, 2019	January 8, 2026	–	–	John Roberts	Bill Clinton
John Lewis Smith Jr.	D. D.C.	May 19, 1982	May 18, 1988	May 19, 1982	May 18, 1988	Warren Burger	Lyndon Johnson
William Henry Stafford Jr.	N.D. Fla.	May 19, 1996	May 18, 2003	–	–	William Rehnquist	Gerald Ford
John Tharp	N.D. Ill.	May 19, 2018	May 18, 2025	–	–	John Roberts	Barack Obama
Ralph Gordon Thompson	W.D. Okla.	June 11, 1990	May 18, 1997	–	–	William Rehnquist	Gerald Ford
Anthony Trenga	E.D. Va.	May 26, 2020	May 18, 2026	May 19, 2023	May 18, 2026	John Roberts	George W. Bush
Roger Vinson	N.D. Fla.	May 4, 2006	May 3, 2013	–	–	John Roberts	Ronald Reagan
Reggie Walton	D. D.C.	May 19, 2007	May 18, 2014	February 22, 2013	May 18, 2014	John Roberts	George W. Bush
Susan Webber Wright	E.D. Ark.	May 19, 2009	May 18, 2016	–	–	John Roberts	George H. W. Bush
James Zagel	N.D. Ill.	May 19, 2008	May 18, 2015	–	–	John Roberts	Ronald Reagan

== Seat succession ==
Presiding Judge
Hart	1979–1982
Smith	1982–1988
Noland	1988–1990
Green	1990–1995
Lamberth	1995–2002
Kollar-Kotelly	2002–2009
Bates	2009–2013
Walton	2013–2014
Hogan	2014–2016
Collyer	2016–2019
Boasberg	2020–2021
Contreras	2021–2023
Trenga	2023–2026
Nichols	2026–present

Seat 1
Established on October 25, 1978 by the Foreign Intelligence Surveillance Act
Hart	1979–1982
Smith	1982–1988
Miles	1989–1996
Stafford	1996–2003
Kazen	2003–2010
Feldman	2010–2017
Kugler	2017–2024
Immergut	2024–present

Seat 2
Established on October 25, 1978 by the Foreign Intelligence Surveillance Act
Bryan	1979–1986
Murray	1986–1993
Cacheris	1993–2000
Hilton	2000–2007
Vinson	2006–2013
Mosman	2013–2020
O'Grady	2020–2023
Nichols	2024–present

Seat 3
Established on October 25, 1978 by the Foreign Intelligence Surveillance Act
Lacey	1979–1985
MacMahon	1985–1989
Aronovitz	1989–1992
Schwartz	1992–1999
Baker	1999–2005
Howard	2005–2012
Dearie	2012–2019
Guirola	2019–2026
Kinkeade	2026–present

Seat 4
Established on October 25, 1978 by the Foreign Intelligence Surveillance Act
MacBride	1979–1980
O'Kelley	1980–1987
Cyr	1987–1989
Freedman	1990–1994
Keenan	1994–2001
Gorton	2001–2008
Walton	2007–2014
Boasberg	2014–2021
Mehta	2021–present

Seat 5
Established on October 25, 1978 by the Foreign Intelligence Surveillance Act
McGarr	1979–1983
Noland	1983–1990
Thompson	1990–1997
Brotman	1997–2004
Scullin	2004–2011
Coffman	2011–2013
Eagan	2013–2019
Singal	2019–2026
Novak	2026–present

Seat 6
Established on October 25, 1978 by the Foreign Intelligence Surveillance Act
Meredith	1979–1981
Bonsal	1981–1984
Devitt	1985–1992
Carroll	1993–1999
Davis	1999–2006
Bates	2006–2013
Collyer	2013–2020
Trenga	2020–2026
Nachmanoff	2026–present

Seat 7
Established on October 25, 1978 by the Foreign Intelligence Surveillance Act
Pierce	1979–1981
Daugherty	1981–1988
Green	1988–1995
Lamberth	1995–2002
Broomfield	2002–2009
Webber Wright	2009–2016
A. Conway	2016–2023
DeGiusti	2023–present

Seat 8
Established on October 26, 2001 by the Patriot Act
Carr	2002–2008
McLaughlin	2008–2015
Jones	2015–2022
Karas	2022–present

Seat 9
Established on October 26, 2001 by the Patriot Act
J. Conway	2002–2003
Benson	2004–2011
Saylor	2011–2018
Tharp	2018–2025
Blakey	2025–present

Seat 10
Established on October 26, 2001 by the Patriot Act
Robertson	2002–2008
Zagel	2008–2015
Russell	2015–2022
Ericksen	2023–present

Seat 11
Established on October 26, 2001 by the Patriot Act
Kollar-Kotelly	2002–2009
Hogan	2009–2016
Contreras	2016–2023
Lioi	2023–present

== See also ==
- Commission nationale de contrôle des interceptions de sécurité
- In re: Sealed Case No. 02-001
- NSA call database
- NSA warrantless surveillance (2001–07)
- Operation CHAOS
