= Thomas F. Hogan =

American judge (born 1938)

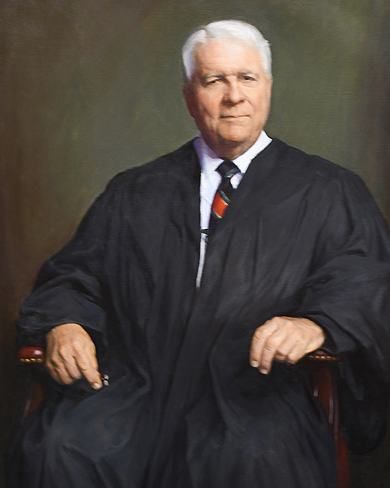

Presiding Judge of the United States Foreign Intelligence Surveillance Court
- In office May 19, 2014 – May 18, 2016
- Appointed by: John Roberts
- Preceded by: Reggie Walton
- Succeeded by: Rosemary M. Collyer

Director of the Administrative Office of the United States Courts
- In office October 17, 2011 – June 30, 2013
- Appointed by: John Roberts
- Preceded by: James C. Duff
- Succeeded by: John D. Bates

Judge of the United States Foreign Intelligence Surveillance Court
- In office May 19, 2009 – May 18, 2016
- Appointed by: John Roberts
- Preceded by: Colleen Kollar-Kotelly
- Succeeded by: Rudolph Contreras

Senior Judge of the United States District Court for the District of Columbia
- Incumbent
- Assumed office May 1, 2008

Chief Judge of the United States District Court for the District of Columbia
- In office June 18, 2001 – May 1, 2008
- Preceded by: Norma Holloway Johnson
- Succeeded by: Royce Lamberth

Judge of the United States District Court for the District of Columbia
- In office August 20, 1982 – May 1, 2008
- Appointed by: Ronald Reagan
- Preceded by: William B. Bryant
- Succeeded by: James Boasberg

Personal details
- Born: Thomas Francis Hogan; 1938 (age 87–88) Washington, D.C., U.S.
- Education: Georgetown University (BA, JD)

Thomas Francis Hogan (born 1938) is a Senior United States district judge of the United States District Court for the District of Columbia, who served as director of the Administrative Office of the United States Courts from October 17, 2011, until June 30, 2013.

== Education ==
Hogan was born in Washington, D.C. He graduated from the Georgetown Preparatory School in 1956, receiving a Bachelor of Arts from Georgetown University in 1960. He attended George Washington University’s masters program in American and English literature from 1960 to 1962, and he graduated with a Juris Doctor from the Georgetown University Law Center in 1966, where he was the St. Thomas More Fellow. Following law school, Hogan clerked for Judge William Blakely Jones of the United States District Court for the District of Columbia from 1966 to 1967.

== Experience ==
Hogan served as counsel to the National Commission for the Reform of Federal Criminal Laws from 1967 to 1968, and was engaged in private practice from 1968 to 1982, in Rockville, Maryland, Chevy Chase, Maryland and Washington, D.C. He was an assistant professor at Potomac School of Law from 1977 to 1979. He was an adjunct professor of law at the Georgetown University Law Center from 1986 to 1992, and has also been a Master of the Prettyman-Leventhal Inn of Court. He served as a member of the executive committee of the United States Judicial Conference and served as the Judicial Conference's chair of the Courtroom Technology Subcommittee. Additionally he served as a member of the board of the Federal Judicial Center.

== Federal judicial service ==
Hogan was nominated by President Ronald Reagan on August 10, 1982, to a seat on the United States District Court for the District of Columbia vacated by Judge William B. Bryant. He was confirmed by the United States Senate on August 20, 1982, and received commission on August 20, 1982. He served as chief judge from June 19, 2001 to May 1, 2008. He assumed senior status on May 1, 2008. He served from 2009 to 2016 on the United States Foreign Intelligence Surveillance Court and served as Presiding Judge of that court from 2014 to 2016.

== Notable cases ==
In 1986, Judge Hogan decided that the blind have a Constitutional right to have Playboy magazine provided to them in braille for free at the expense of the federal Government.

Congress passed the Line Item Veto Act of 1996 to control "pork barrel spending" that favors a particular region rather than the nation as a whole. President Bill Clinton used the line item veto 11 times, striking spending on 82 items. The first case challenging the line-item veto was ordered dismissed by the Supreme Court for lack of standing, vacating the trial court's decision finding that the veto was unconstitutional. Raines v. Byrd, 521 U.S. 811 (1997). In the second case, Hogan ruled February 12, 1998, that such unilateral amendment or repeal of only parts of statutes violated the U.S. Constitution. This ruling was affirmed on June 25, 1998, in a 6–3 decision of the Supreme Court of the United States in the case Clinton v. City of New York.

In 2001, Judge Hogan sentenced an 82-year-old man to five years' imprisonment for drug possession.

In 2005, Judge Hogan jailed New York Times reporter Judith Miller for failing to reveal her confidential sources, a decision that Reporters Without Borders termed "a dark day for freedom of the press."

In United States v. TANIOS, No. 21-3034 (D.C. Cir. Aug. 9, 2021), the Court of Appeals for the D.C. Circuit found that Judge Hogan had erred in ordering the indefinite pre-trial detention of George Tanios, who Judge Hogan had believed had the intent to use pepper-spray during the January 6, 2021 Capitol riot. The Court of Appeals stated: "[Judge Hogan] clearly erred in [hi]s individualized assessment of appellant's dangerousness. The record reflects that Tanios has no past felony convictions, no ties to any extremist organizations, and no post-January 6 criminal behavior that would otherwise show him to pose a danger to the community within the meaning of the Bail Reform Act."

== Sources ==
- Brief Biography on the DC District Court's website

Legal offices
Preceded by William B. Bryant	Judge of the United States District Court for the District of Columbia; 1982–2008	Succeeded by James Boasberg
Preceded by Norma Holloway Johnson	Chief Judge of the United States District Court for the District of Columbia; 2001–2008	Succeeded by Royce Lamberth
Preceded by Colleen Kollar-Kotelly	Judge of the United States Foreign Intelligence Surveillance Court; 2009–2016	Succeeded by Rudolph Contreras
Preceded by James C. Duff	Director of the Administrative Office of the United States Courts; 2011–2013	Succeeded by John D. Bates
Preceded by Reggie Walton	Presiding Judge of the United States Foreign Intelligence Surveillance Court; 2014–2016	Succeeded by Rosemary M. Collyer
