= James C. Duff =

American museum CEO, public servant

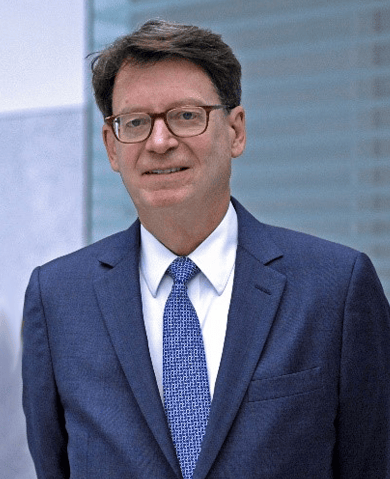
- Duff in 2022

Acting Dean of the University of Kentucky J. David Rosenberg College of Law
- In office July 1, 2025 – July 20, 2026
- Preceded by: Paul Salamanca (acting)
- Succeeded by: Gregory F. Van Tatenhove

Director of Administrative Office of the United States Courts
- In office January 5, 2015 – December 31, 2020
- Preceded by: John D. Bates
- Succeeded by: Roslynn R. Mauskopf
- In office July 2006 – September 15, 2011
- Preceded by: Leonidas Ralph Mecham
- Succeeded by: Thomas F. Hogan

Personal details
- Born: 1953 (age 72–73)
- Education: University of Kentucky (BA); University of Edinburgh; Georgetown University (JD)
- Profession: Attorney, administrator

James C. Duff (born 1953) is the executive director of the Supreme Court Historical Society.

He previously served as director of the Administrative Office of the U.S. Courts (AO), from July 2006 to September 2011 and again from January 2015 to December 2020, each time being appointed by Chief Justice John Roberts. From 2025 to 2026, he served as acting dean of the University of Kentucky Rosenberg College of Law.

== Education and early career ==
Duff graduated magna cum laude from the University of Kentucky Honors Program in 1975 with a degree in political science and philosophy, where he was Phi Beta Kappa. He also was a walk-on on the university's basketball team.

After studying at the University of Edinburgh in Scotland in 1974, he returned to the U.S. in 1975 and worked for four years as an aide in the chambers of Chief Justice Warren E. Burger. He graduated from Georgetown Law in 1981, then worked at the law firm Clifford and Warnke, where in 1990 he became a partner.

In 1991, a large contingent of Clifford and Warnke lawyers and staff, including Duff, merged with the firm of Howrey and Simon, where he practiced antitrust, commercial litigation, and international trade until 1996.

== Legal and political career ==
From 1996 to 2000, Duff was Chief Justice William Rehnquist's Administrative Assistant, now called "Counselor to the Chief Justice," serving as his liaison with the other branches of government and as executive director of the Judicial Fellows Commission. He preceded Sally Rider as the Chief Justice's chief of staff, in which Duff assisted Rehnquist in his roles as chair of the Judicial Conference of the United States and the Federal Judicial Center Board. He also served as counselor to the Chief Justice as presiding officer of the U.S. Senate's 1999 presidential impeachment trial.

From 2000 to 2006, Duff served as the managing partner of the Washington office of Baker, Donelson, Bearman, Caldwell & Berkowitz, which was opened by former Majority Leader Howard Baker Jr. There he represented the Federal Judges Association before Congress as well as the Freedom Forum.. He also represented the University of Kentucky's federal government interests in Washington and at the request of NCAA President Myles Brand, in 2006 he authored an overview and report to the NCAA on its rules and procedures. Duff has taught constitutional law at Georgetown University as an adjunct professor. He was named the Peter Mullen Professor of Law at Georgetown University for the fall of 2014 and previously served as the first lecturer of the Giles Seminar at Georgetown for two years.

In September 2005, Duff was a pallbearer at Rehnquist's funeral, alongside seven of Rehnquist's former law clerks. Duff authored a tribute to Chief Justice Rehnquist in the November 2005 edition of the Harvard Law Review and spoke at the unveiling ceremony for the William H. Rehnquist bust in the great hall of the Supreme Court in December 2009.

In April 2006, Duff was appointed director of the Administrative Office of the United States Courts by Chief Justice John Roberts. As director, Duff was the secretary of the Judicial Conference of the United States and a member of the board of the Federal Judicial Center. On May 31, 2011, Duff announced that he would be stepping down on September 15 to assume the position of CEO at the Freedom Forum.

He was appointed to the Georgetown Law Center's Board of Visitors in 2014 and serves on the boards of Freedom House, the Supreme Court Historical Society and the University of Kentucky Arts & Sciences Advisory Board. He was named to the University of Kentucky Arts & Sciences Hall of Fame in 2012 and was given the Georgetown Entertainment and Media Law Achievement Award in 2012. Duff was elected to the membership at the American Law Institute in 2016.

On November 4, 2014, it was announced by Chief Justice Roberts that Duff would once again become director of the Administrative Office of the United States Courts, effective January 1, 2015. He succeeded director Judge John D. Bates. He retired on December 31, 2020.

== Personal life ==
Duff and his wife, Kathleen Gallagher Duff, live in Bethesda, Maryland, and have three children.
