= Henry P. Chandler =

American lawyer (1880–1975)

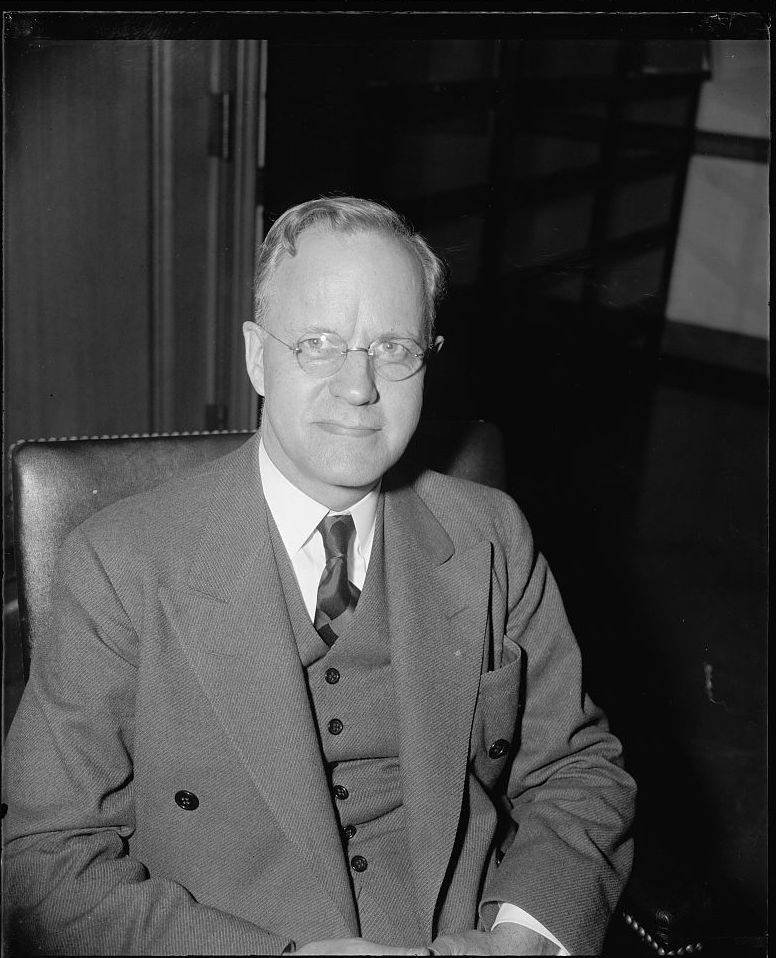
- Chandler shortly after taking office, December 9, 1939

Director of the Administrative Office of the United States Courts
- In office November 22, 1939 – October 31, 1956
- Appointed by: Charles Evans Hughes
- Succeeded by: Warren Olney III

Personal details
- Born: Henry Porter Chandler; March 19, 1880 Indian Orchard, Massachusetts
- Died: December 12, 1975 (aged 95) Bethesda, Maryland
- Resting place: Oak Woods Cemetery, Chicago, Illinois; 41°46′10″N 87°35′57″W

Henry Porter Chandler (March 19, 1880, Indian Orchard, Massachusetts – December 12, 1975, Bethesda, Maryland) was the first Director of the Administrative Office of the United States Courts, serving from the creation of the Administrative Office in 1939 until his retirement in 1956.

Chandler was born March 19, 1880, in Indian Orchard, Massachusetts, to John Henry Chandler and Abbie White Chandler (née Smith). He grew up in Massachusetts and California. He attended Stanford University before transferring to Harvard University, from which he received his Bachelor of Arts degree in 1901. He obtained his J.D. degree from the University of Chicago Law School in 1906.

Upon graduation from law school, Chandler was admitted to the Illinois State Bar Association, and began a 33-year career practicing law in Chicago, eventually becoming partner in the law firm of Tolman and Chandler. He served as president of the Chicago Bar Association and chairman of the municipal law section of the American Bar Association from 1938 to 1939. He also served as president of the Union League Club of Chicago and the City Club of Chicago.

When the Administrative Office of the United States Courts was established in 1939, United States Chief Justice Charles Evans Hughes appointed Chandler to be the first director of the office on November 22, 1939. Chandler held that office for almost 17 years under four Chief Justices, until his retirement on October 31, 1956.

After his retirement from the Administrative Office, Chandler was tapped in 1957 by the territorial government of Hawaii to undertake a study of the administration of territorial courts, and to recommend legislation to implement his findings. His recommendations were adopted with minor changes, and became the law of the state when Hawaii was admitted to the Union in 1959. The Supreme Court of Illinois appointed Chandler to serve as the first court administrator for the state of Illinois. He stepped down from that position in September 1960.

== Personal life ==
Chandler's first wife was Helen Firman Mack, whom he married in 1906. Helen died in 1930, and Chandler remarried in 1931, to Olive Hull. He had one daughter, Margaret Mack Chandler, with his first wife.

Chandler died on December 12, 1975, in Bethesda, Maryland, and was buried at Oak Woods Cemetery in Chicago.

== Publications ==
Chandler authored a number of articles, particularly in the areas of criminal probation and court administration, including:

- Chandler, Henry P. (1922). "The Attitude of the Law Toward Beauty". American Bar Association Journal. 8: 440.
- ——— (March 1923). "Thoughts on Constitution-Making Suggested by the Experience of Illinois". University of Pennsylvania Law Review. 71 (3): 218–228. doi:10.2307/3314330. JSTOR 3314330. Archived from the original on October 8, 2014.
- ——— (1936). "The National Labor Relations Act". American Bar Association Journal. 22: 235.
- ——— (Winter 1938). "The Administration of the Federal Courts". Law and Contemporary Problems. 13 (1): 182–199. doi:10.2307/1190109. JSTOR 1190109.
- ——— (1941). "The Place of the Administrative Office in the Federal Court System". Cornell Law Quarterly. 27: 364.
- ——— (1947). "Making the Judicial Machinery Function Efficiently". New York University Law Quarterly Review. 22: 445.
- ——— (1948). "Probation: What It Can Do and What It Takes". Federal Probation. 12: 11.
- Chandler, Henry P.; McConnell, Edward B.; Tolman, Leland L.; Batson, Eleanor R. (1958). "Administering the Courts - Federal, State and Local". Journal of the American Judiciary Society. 42: 13.
- Chandler, Henry P. (1950). "The Future of Federal Probation". Federal Probation. 14: 41.
- ——— (October 1951). "Latter-Day Procedures in the Sentencing and Treatment of Offenders in the Federal Courts". Virginia Law Review. 37 (6): 825–846. doi:10.2307/1069323. JSTOR 1069323.
- ——— (March 1960). "The Problem of Congestion and Delay in the Federal Courts". Annals of the American Academy of Political and Social Science. 328: 144–152. doi:10.1177/000271626032800117. JSTOR 1032730. S2CID 154630321.
- ——— (1962). "The Winds of Change in Federal Judicial Administration". Journal of the American Judiciary Society. 46: 243.
