= United States Probation and Pretrial Services System =

Probation office of the U.S. federal judiciary

The United States Probation and Pretrial Services System, part of the Administrative Office of the United States Courts, is the probation office of the federal judiciary of the United States. It serves the United States district courts in all 94 federal judicial districts nationwide and constitutes the community corrections arm of the Federal Judiciary. It administers probation and supervised release under United States federal law enforced by probation officers.

== History ==
The first legislation for Federal Probation Law was introduced in 1908, one of which was prepared by the New York State Probation Commission and the National Probation Association (later known as the National Council on Crime and Delinquency) and introduced before Congress by United States Senator Robert L. Owen of Oklahoma. The bill provided for a suspension of a sentence, in U.S. District Court, and a sentence of probation. The bill also provided for compensation of $5 per diem for federal probation officers. This first attempt did not pass, and through 1909 to 1925 there were 34 bills introduced to establish federal probation law.

In 1915, Attorney General T. W. Gregory selected a case from the Northern District of Ohio where Judge John M. Killits suspended "during the good behavior of the defendant" the execution of a sentence of five years and ordered the court term to remain open for that period. The defendant, a first offender and a young man of reputable back ground, had pleaded guilty to embezzling $4,700 by falsifying entries in the books of a Toledo bank. He had made full restitution and the bank's officers did not wish to prosecute. The Government moved that Judge Killits' order be vacated as being "beyond the powers of the court." The motion was denied by Judge Kiliits; A petition for writ of mandamus was prepared and filed with the Supreme Court on June 1, 1915. Judge Killits, as respondent, filed his answer October 14, 1915. He pointed out that the power to suspend sentence had been exercised continuously by federal judges, that the Department of Justice had acquiesced in it for many years, and that it was the only amelioration possible as there was no federal probation system. In one circuit, incidentally, it was admitted the practice of suspending sentences had in substance existed for "probably sixty years."

In 1925, the Federal Probation Act was introduced by Senator Copeland as S.1042 and Representative Graham as H.R. 5195. The U.S. Senate passed in unanimously but the House passed the law by a vote of 170 in favor and 49 opposed. On March 4, 1925, President Calvin Coolidge, a former governor of Massachusetts and very familiar with the benefits of a functioning probation system, signed the bill in to law. This act gave the U.S. courts the power to appoint federal probation officers and authority to sentence defendants to probation instead of a prison sentence. It later gave U.S. probation officers the responsibility of supervising offenders granted parole by the United States Parole Commission, military offenders and pretrial supervision. The responsibility of the United States Probation Service was first under the United States Department of Justice, under the supervising authority of the Federal Bureau of Prisons; however, in 1940, the Administrative Office of the U.S. Courts was established and assumed the responsibility.

U.S. Pretrial Services came along more than 50 years later, in 1982, with the Pretrial Services Act of 1982. It was developed as a means to reduce both crimes committed by persons released into the community pending trial and unnecessary pretrial detention. Twenty three districts have both separate U.S. Probation and Pretrial Services Offices. In the remaining 71 districts, the probation office provides pretrial services to the court.

== Federal probation officers ==
United States Probation Officers (USPO), also referred to as Federal Probation Officers, are the largest cadre of federal law enforcement officers in the federal judiciary (after the small division of US Supreme Court Police who serve to protect the U.S. Supreme Court and its justices).

Most districts require that all new officers attend the Probation and Pretrial Services National Training Academy at the Federal Law Enforcement Training Center soon after coming on board. Officers are eligible for a 20-year retirement and must be appointed prior to their 37th birthday because the mandatory separation age is 57. Almost all districts require prior experience in a similar field, a background suitability investigation, drug test, and medical examination as a pre-requisite for hiring.

== Districts ==
Federal Probation is unique to other federal law enforcement agencies in that they are regionally aligned to their judicial districts, rather than a single headquarters element. All officers within a district report to their Chief Probation Officer or Chief Pretrial Services Officer, who in turn serves the Chief District Judge. The national element is the Administrative Office of the United States Courts, Washington, DC, which provides administrative support to the courts, including staffing and other resources, and enforces policies promulgated by the Judicial Conference of the United States, the policy-making body of the Federal Judiciary.

Many districts have split their Probation Officers into Pre-Sentence Investigation Units and Supervision Units. Pre-Sentence Investigators conduct comprehensive investigations into the background of defendants convicted of federal crimes. Upon completion of their investigation, they are required to employ the sentencing guidelines and submit a sentencing recommendation to the presiding judge. Often, they are also asked to confer privately with judges regarding their recommendation. Officers assigned to Supervision Units supervise felons convicted of federal crimes who are released into society on either Supervised Release or Probation. Supervision Officers must enforce court ordered conditions and are mandated to use their discretion and skills to mitigate the offenders risk to society. Both Supervision Officers and Pre-Sentence Investigators deal with a wide range of offenders, many of whom have extensive criminal histories. Federal Probation Officers also represent the United States Department of Justice in the performance of duties connected with federal parole.

== See also ==
- Federal Bureau of Prisons
- Federal crime
- United States district court
