= In re Sealed Case No. 02-001 =

In re: Sealed Case No. 02-001, 310 F.3d 717 (2002), is a per curiam decision by the United States Foreign Intelligence Surveillance Court of Review in which it reviewed restrictions that were placed upon a Foreign Intelligence Surveillance Act (FISA) application by the Foreign Intelligence Surveillance Court (FISC) on May 17, 2002. The Court of Review reversed the FISC's restrictions by stating that they "are not required by FISA or the Constitution." The opinion represents the first meeting of and first opinion by the Court of Review. For the purposes of review, the FISC's modification of the requested application worked as a "denial" and thus gave the Court of Review jurisdiction to take the case.

== Case ==
The Court noted that the case raised important questions of statutory interpretation and the constitutionality of provision of FISA. In particular, the opinion addressed changes made in the act due to the passage of the Patriot Act. The Court addressed these questions in the context of a single request for an order authorizing electronic surveillance made by the government to the FISC. The FISC approved the requested order but "imposed certain requirements and limitations" on the government. The government appealed to the Court of Review.

The Court first stated that there appeared to be no disagreement between the government and the FISC as to the propriety of the requested surveillance because the FISC found that the government had shown probable cause to believe that the target is an agent of a foreign power. The government therefore appealed only the restrictions imposed, which include orders that

law enforcement officials shall not make recommendations to intelligence officials concerning the initiation, operation, continuation or expansion of FISA searches or surveillances. Additionally, the FBI and the Criminal Division [of the Department of Justice] shall ensure that law enforcement officials do not direct or control the use of the FISA procedures to enhance criminal prosecution, and that advice intended to preserve the option of a criminal prosecution does not inadvertently result in the Criminal Division’s directing or controlling the investigation using FISA searches and surveillances toward law enforcement objectives.

The FISC also created what the court referred to as a "chaperone requirement," which required that a unit of the Justice Department (the Office of Intelligence Policy and Review (OIPR)) "be invited" to all meetings between the FBI and the Criminal Division involving co-ordination of efforts to investigate and respond to potential hostile acts. The Court of Review stated that the lower opinion establishing the restrictions did not clearly set forth the basis for its decision. Instead, the restrictions "appear[] to proceed from the assumption that FISA constructed a barrier between counterintelligence/intelligence officials and law enforcement officers in the Executive Branch," but the opinion did not support such an assumption. This "wall" between the intelligence officials and law enforcement officers was created by the FISC in reliance on "its statutory authority to approve 'minimization procedures' designed to prevent the acquisition, retention, and dissemination within the government of material gathered in an electronic surveillance that is unnecessary to the government's need for foreign intelligence information."

Two arguments were presented by the government in opposition to these restrictions. One was that the government argued that the pre-Patriot Act limitation in FISA restricting the government's use of intelligence information is "an illusion." Alternatively, the government argued that even if the "primary purpose" limitation exists, the passage of the Patriot Act eliminated that concept from FISA. As a corollary, the government argued that the restrictions imposed by the FISC below were a misconstruction of the FISA provisions and "an end run around" the amendments added by the Patriot Act.

== Amicus curiae briefs ==
The American Civil Liberties Union (ACLU) and the National Association of Criminal Defense Lawyers (NACDL) submitted amicus curiae briefs in support of the restrictions. The briefs argued primarily that the FISA statute and the amendments of the Patriot Act are unconstitutional under the Fourth Amendment unless they are construed to prohibit the government from obtaining a FISA surveillance order if its "primary purpose" is criminal prosecution.

== Findings of the Court ==
Among other things, the Court of Review found that FISA is constitutional, that the minimization requirements of FISA are not grounds to limit the purpose of the FISA application, and that FISA may be used to collect evidence for criminal prosecution. The Court also noted but made no judgment regarding "the President’s inherent constitutional authority to conduct warrantless foreign intelligence surveillance," which relates to part of the government justification in the NSA warrantless surveillance controversy.

== See also ==
- Foreign Intelligence Surveillance Act
- United States Foreign Intelligence Surveillance Court
- United States Foreign Intelligence Surveillance Court of Review
