= John D. Bates =

American federal judge (born 1946)

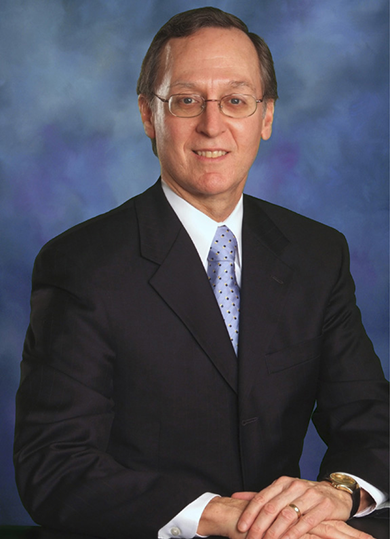

Director of the Administrative Office of the United States Courts
- In office July 1, 2013 – January 5, 2015
- Appointed by: John Roberts
- Preceded by: Thomas F. Hogan
- Succeeded by: James C. Duff

Presiding Judge of the United States Foreign Intelligence Surveillance Court
- In office May 19, 2009 – February 21, 2013
- Appointed by: John Roberts
- Preceded by: Colleen Kollar-Kotelly
- Succeeded by: Reggie Walton

Senior Judge of the United States District Court for the District of Columbia
- Incumbent
- Assumed office October 12, 2014

Judge of the United States District Court for the District of Columbia
- In office December 14, 2001 – October 12, 2014
- Appointed by: George W. Bush
- Preceded by: Stanley S. Harris
- Succeeded by: Seat abolished

Personal details
- Born: John Deacon Bates; October 11, 1946 (age 79) Elizabeth, New Jersey, U.S.
- Education: Wesleyan University (BA); University of Maryland, Baltimore (JD)

John Deacon Bates (born October 11, 1946) is an American lawyer and jurist serving as a senior United States district judge of the U.S. District Court for the District of Columbia. He was appointed in 2001 by President George W. Bush, and he assumed senior status in 2014. He served as Director of the Administrative Office of the United States Courts, from July 1, 2013 to January 5, 2015, after which he returned to full-time service as a senior judge.

== Personal life and education ==
Born in Elizabeth, New Jersey, Bates graduated from the Pingry School in 1964. He received a Bachelor of Arts degree from Wesleyan University in 1968, and a Juris Doctor from the University of Maryland School of Law in 1976. From 1968 to 1971, he served as a first lieutenant in the United States Army. He and his wife, Carol Ann Rhees, also a former lawyer with Steptoe & Johnson LLP, live in Bethesda, Maryland. They have three children.

== Career ==
Bates was a law clerk for Judge Roszel Cathcart Thomsen of the United States District Court for the District of Maryland from 1976 to 1977 and was an associate at Steptoe & Johnson from 1977 to 1980. He served as an Assistant United States Attorney for the District of Columbia from 1980 to 1987, and was Chief of the Civil Division of the United States Attorney's Office from 1987 to 1997. Bates was on detail as Deputy Independent Counsel for the Whitewater investigation from 1995 to mid-1997. In 1998, he joined the Washington, D.C. law firm of Miller & Chevalier, where he was Chair of the Government Contracts/Litigation Department and a member of the executive committee. From September 1995 until leaving in March 1997, Bates worked as Deputy Independent Counsel for Kenneth Starr and the Independent Counsel's office during the investigation into President Bill Clinton.

== District Court service ==
On September 4, 2001, Bates was nominated by President George W. Bush to a seat on the United States District Court for the District of Columbia, vacated by Stanley S. Harris. He was confirmed by the United States Senate on December 11, 2001, and received his commission on December 14, 2001. Bates took senior status on October 12, 2014. Bates has served on the Advisory Committee for Procedures of the D.C. Circuit and on the Civil Justice Reform Committee for the District Court, and as Treasurer of the District of Columbia Bar, Chairman of the Publications Committee of the D.C. Bar, and Chairman of the Litigation Section of the Federal Bar Association. He was a member of the Board of Directors of the Washington Lawyers' Committee for Civil Rights and Urban Affairs. In 2005, he was appointed by Chief Justice William Rehnquist to serve on the Judicial Conference of the United States' Committee on Court Administration and Case Management (CACM). In February 2006, he was appointed by Chief Justice John Roberts to serve as a judge of the United States Foreign Intelligence Surveillance Court (FISA Court).

== Notable rulings ==
- On May 23, 2025 Judge Bates ruled on JENNER & BLOCK LLP v. U.S. DEPARTMENT OF JUSTICE in Civil Action No. 25-916, declaring the Trump administration's Executive Order 14246 unlawful and enjoined its operation, citing in defense of an erstwhile Jenner staff lawyer, Andrew A. Weissmann that “Weissmann’s activity falls easily within the First Amendment’s muscular protection for ‘criticism of government and public officials’”. https://www.nytimes.com/2025/05/23/us/politics/trump-jenner-block-law-firm.html
- On February 11, 2025, Judge Bates ordered U.S. health agencies to restore websites that they abruptly took offline in response to an executive order by President Donald Trump telling them to scrub websites of "gender ideology extremism."
- On August 3, 2018, Judge Bates ruled that "the Trump administration did not justify its decision to eliminate the Deferred Action for Childhood Arrivals program, also known as DACA" and ordered DACA to be reinstated. He gave the administration 20 days to appeal.
- On April 24, 2018, Judge Bates ruled that the Trump administration must resume accepting new applications for Deferred Action for Childhood Arrivals (DACA) but stayed his decision for 90 days to allow the Department of Homeland Security to explain why DACA was being canceled.
- On January 23, 2017, Judge Bates blocked the $37 billion merger between health insurance companies Aetna and Humana, saying the deal would hurt competition and raise prices for consumers.
- On October 25, 2016, Judge Bates dismissed freed Guantanamo Bay detention camp prisoner Shawali Khan's petition for habeas corpus as moot. Khan had opposed the dismissal, arguing that, because his detention had never been declared illegal, his past as a U.S. prisoner was preventing him from getting medical treatment for injuries suffered during his imprisonment. While dismissing Khan's lawsuit, Bates wrote he was nevertheless "sympathetic to the pickle".
- On March 19, 2014, Judge Bates in Innovator Enterprises, Inc v Jones found for the plaintiff and vacated BATFE's classification of the company's "stabilizer brake" as a "firearm silencer".
  Hypotheticals further illustrate the weakness of this methodology. A mouse is not an "elephant" solely because it has three characteristics that are common to known elephants: a tail, gray skin, and four legs. A child's bike is not a "motorcycle" solely because it has three characteristics common to known motorcycles: two rubber tires, handlebars, and a leather seat. And a Bud Light is not "Single-Malt Scotch," just because it is frequently served in a glass container, contains alcohol, and is available for purchase at a tavern. To close with a firearm-related example: a hockey puck is not a "rubber bullet," just because it has rounded sides, is made of vulcanized rubber, and is capable of causing injury when launched at high speeds. Learning that one object has three characteristics in common with some category may not be very helpful in determining whether the object in question belongs in that category.
- In November 2013, the Office of the Director of National Intelligence declassified and released a circa-July 2010 (date classified) FISC ruling by Judge Bates authorizing the National Security Agency to restart mass collection of internet metadata, including those of U.S. citizens. Bates noted that the NSA had been violating provisions of various laws, but nevertheless decided to allow the government to continue many aspects of the mass surveillance program. Critics of encroaching U.S. security state policies, in a nod to the Bates numbering method used in the legal field, appropriated the "Bates stamp" moniker as a neologism to refer to often uncritical FISC scrutiny of U.S. government conduct when considering Foreign Intelligence Surveillance Act (FISA) applications.
- On December 10, 2010, Bates dismissed a challenge to President Barack Obama's targeted killing order against Muslim cleric Anwar al-Awlaki, a dual American and Yemeni citizen with ties to al-Qaeda. Bates ruled that al-Awlaki's father, Nasser al-Awlaki, who filed the suit with assistance by the American Civil Liberties Union and the Center for Constitutional Rights, lacked legal standing in the case against the Obama administration. Bates stopped short of granting the executive branch "unreviewable authority" to order the killing of an American citizen, instead concluding that the case would likely be settled in another forum outside the courtroom.
- On July 31, 2008, Bates ruled, in a dispute between the Administrative and Legislative branches, that President George W. Bush's advisers, chief of staff Josh Bolten and former legal counsel Harriet Miers, are not immune from congressional subpoenas to testify about the firing of nine U.S. attorneys and turn over all related, non-privileged documents.
- As a District Court Judge, Bates dismissed the GAO's effort to learn with whom Vice President Dick Cheney's energy task force conferred.
- On July 19, 2007, he dismissed a lawsuit filed by Valerie Plame Wilson and her husband against Vice President Dick Cheney, White House political adviser Karl Rove, former White House aide I. Lewis "Scooter" Libby and former Deputy Secretary of State Richard Armitage. Plame's lawyers had said from the beginning of the lawsuit that it would be quite difficult to win, since public officials and servants are generally immune from such suits filed in connection with their jobs. Plame's identity as a Central Intelligence Agency field operative was revealed in a syndicated newspaper column in 2003. This revelation coincided with (Plame's husband) Wilson's criticism of the Bush administration's policy in Iraq. Many of the administration's opponents questioned the timing of the leak of Plame's identity, and assign blame of the leak to officials in the administration. Although several administration officials were questioned in an investigation of the leak, no formal charges were brought, and Libby was then found guilty of lying and obstruction of the investigation as a consequence of his lying. President George W. Bush subsequently commuted Libby's jail sentence as unduly harsh. In April 2018, President Donald Trump fully pardoned Libby.
- Bates stated in his ruling that the couple's allegations "pose important questions relating to the propriety of actions undertaken by our highest government officials," but that he had to dismiss their claims for jurisdictional reasons. While saying the Bush administration officials' actions "may have been highly unsavory", Bates nonetheless ruled "there can be no serious dispute" that speaking to the press to rebut Wilson's criticism was "within the scope of defendants' duties as high-level Executive Branch officials." The Wilsons appealed.
- In a December 30, 2002 decision, Bates of the U.S. District Court ruled that lead plaintiff Representative Dennis Kucinich and 31 other members of the United States House of Representatives have no standing to challenge President Bush's withdrawal from the Anti-Ballistic Missile (ABM) Treaty without congressional approval. He also ruled that the case presents a "political question" not suitable for resolution by the courts."

== Sources ==
- "Judge John D. Bates Appointed to the FISA Court". from the Federation of American Scientists.
- "Judge tosses out ex-spy's lawsuit against Cheney in CIA leak". from CNN. July 19, 2007.

Legal offices
Preceded by Stanley S. Harris	Judge of the United States District Court for the District of Columbia; 2001–2014	Seat abolished pursuant to 104 Stat. 5089
Preceded by Colleen Kollar-Kotelly	Presiding Judge of the United States Foreign Intelligence Surveillance Court; 2009–2013	Succeeded by Reggie Walton
Preceded by Thomas F. Hogan	Director of the Administrative Office of the United States Courts; 2013–2015	Succeeded by James C. Duff
