= NAACP LDF v. Trump =

United States district court case

NAACP Legal Defense & Educational Fund, Inc., et al v. Trump et al
- Court: United States District Court for the Southern District of New York
- Full case name: NAACP Legal Defense & Educational Fund, Inc.; The Ordinary People Society; HEALSTL; National Association for the Advancement of Colored People Pennsylvania State Conference; National Association for the Advancement of Colored People Florida State Conference; Hispanic Federation; Mi Familia Vota; Southwest Voter Registration Education Project;and Labor Council for Latin American Advancement v. Donald J. Trump, in his official capacity as President of the United States of America; Presidential Advisory Commission on Election Integrity, an advisory committee commissioned by President Trump; Michael Pence, in his official capacity as Vice President of the United States and chair of the Presidential Advisory Commission on Election Integrity; Kris W. Kobach in his official capacity as Vice Chair of the Presidential Advisory Commission on Election Integrity
- Decided: Dismissed on February 28, 2018
- Defendants: Donald J. Trump; Presidential Advisory Commission on Election Integrity; Michael Pence; Kris W. Kobach
- Counsel for plaintiffs: Sherrilyn Ifill; Janai Nelson; Samuel Spital; Rachel Kleinman; Natasha C. Merle; Mexican American Legal Defense and Educational Fund; LatinoJustice PRLDEF
- Plaintiffs: NAACP Legal Defense and Educational Fund, Inc. The Ordinary People Society #HealSTL; Hispanic Federation; Mi Familia Vota; Southwest Voter Education Project; Labor Council for Latin American Advancement; Florida State Conference of the NAACP; Pennsylvania State Conference of the NAACP
- Citation: No. 1:17-cv-05427

Court membership
- Judge sitting: Andrew L. Carter Jr.

NAACP Legal Defense & Educational Fund, Inc. v. Trump, No. 1:17-cv-05427-ALC (S.D.N.Y. 2017), was a lawsuit filed in the United States District Court for the Southern District of New York. The plaintiffs, the NAACP Legal Defense Fund, The Ordinary People Society, and a coalition of civil rights groups alleged that the defendants, President Donald Trump, the Vice President Michael Pence, and Kris Kobach were in violation of the Fifth and Fifteenth Amendments and the Federal Advisory Committee Act by establishing the Presidential Advisory Commission on Election Integrity (PEIC) for the purpose of intentionally discriminating against Black and Latino voters in violation of the Fifth and Fifteenth Amendments to the Constitution and the Federal Advisory Committee Act.

== Background ==
Kris Kobach was the Secretary of State of Kansas from 2011 to 2019. On November 20, 2016, President Trump asked Kobach to co-chair a commission to investigate possible voting irregularities in the 2016 presidential election. Kobach was a defendant in parallel lawsuits filed by the Electronic Privacy Information Center and the ACLU.

On June 28, 2017, the Commission requested voter records from each of the states and the District of Columbia. Forty-four states rejected the request to deliver voter records On July 10, 2017, the Commission postponed its request of the states.

The United States Department of Justice represented Trump.

According to the text of the complaint, the suit asked for a permanent injunction halting the operation of the Presidential Advisory Commission on Election Integrity.

== Specific allegations ==
- The President has neither constitutional nor statutory authority to create a new executive organ for the purpose of launching an investigation that targets individual or groups of voters.
- President Trump has not appointed a commission for the purpose of consulting with fair-and-balanced advisors; rather, he has appointed a commission stacked with biased members to undertake an investigation into unfounded allegations of voter fraud, even though Congress has specifically delegated the authority to ensure the accuracy of voter rolls to the Election Assistance Commission and state election officials, not the President.
- Violations of the Fifth and Fifteenth Amendments and Unauthorized Presidential Action

== Procedural history ==
A second amended complaint was filed on October 20, 2017. The government moved to dismiss the case in November 2017. After the government disbanded the commission on January 3, 2018, the case was dismissed on February 28, 2018, at the NAACP Legal Defense Fund's request.

== See also ==
- List of lawsuits involving Donald Trump
- ACLU v. Trump and Pence
- Federal Advisory Committee Act
- Presidential Advisory Commission on Election Integrity
