= Joyner v. Presidential Advisory Commission on Election Integrity =

US federal case

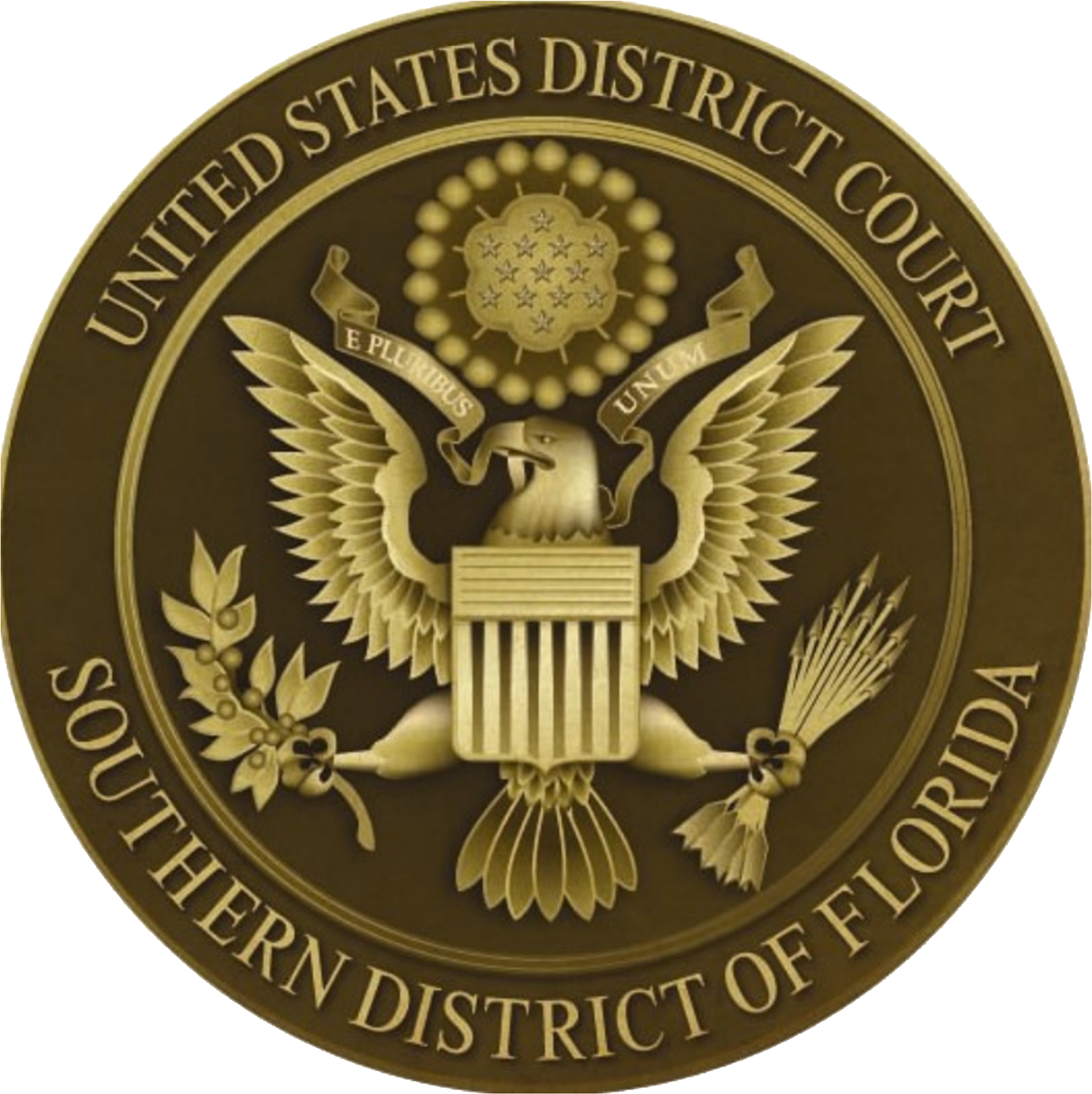
- Court: United States District Court for the Southern District of Florida

Court membership
- Judge sitting: Marcia G. Cooke

Case opinions
- Per curiam

Joyner v. Presidential Advisory Commission on Election Integrity (No. 1:17-cv-22568-MGC) is a federal case brought before the United States District Court for the Southern District of Florida. The plaintiffs, including Arthenia Joyner, the American Civil Liberties Union of Florida, and others, sought to enjoin the State of Florida from transferring voter records to the Presidential Advisory Commission on Election Integrity.

After the Commission was disbanded, Kris Kobach, the vice chairman, announced his intent to turn the records over to the United States Department of Homeland Security.

== Background ==
On November 20, 2016, President Trump asked Kobach to co-chair a commission ("Pence-Kobach Commission" or "PAEC") to investigate possible voting irregularities in the 2016 Presidential Election. Kobach is a defendant in a parallel lawsuit filed by Electronic Privacy Information Center (EPIC).

On June 28, 2017, the Commission requested voter records from each of the states and the District of Columbia. Forty-four states rejected the request to deliver voter records On July 10, 2017, the Commission postponed its request of the states.

== Specific allegations ==
- The Presidential Advisory Commission on Election Integrity ("Pence-Kobach Commission") violates the procedural requirements of the Federal Advisory Committee Act 5 U.S.C. app. 2 §§1-16

== Latest developments and next steps ==
On January 3, 2018, President Donald J. Trump terminated the Commission by executive order. That same day, Kobach gave media interviews in which he indicated that the Commission's preliminary findings would be sent to the United States Department of Homeland Security.

On January 5, 2018, the plaintiffs filed an emergency motion for injunction to prevent the transfer of any documents from the Commission to any other persons. On January 9, 2018, the court ordered the government to clarify whether the state voter data would be sent to DHS. In response to the plaintiffs' motion, the United States Department of Justice stated that the state voter data would not be turned over to DHS. The DOJ stated that Kris Kobach could not speak about the disposition of the Commission's documents on behalf of the government. As a result, the court ordered the government to produce Kobach or another Commission member to explain what had happened with the documents, and whether they had or would be given to DHS or any other person or entity. As a result of the litigation, the White House has stated that the state voter data will be destroyed.
