= Presidential Advisory Commission on Election Integrity =

Temporary commission created by President Donald Trump (2017–2018)

Executive Order 13799
- Establishment of Presidential Advisory Commission on Election Integrity

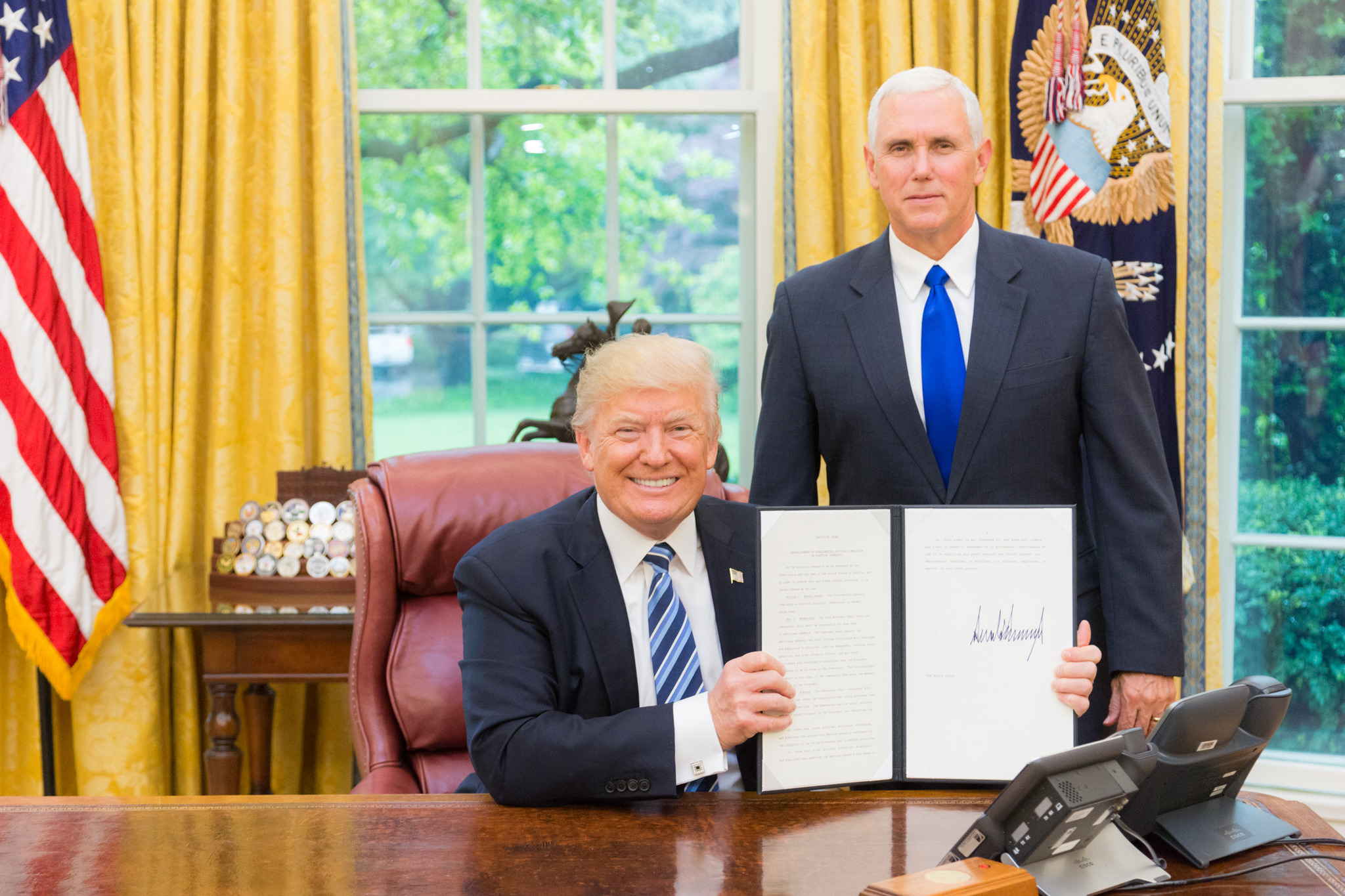
- President Donald Trump, joined by Vice President Mike Pence, displays his signed Executive Order for the Establishment of a Presidential Advisory Commission on Election Integrity in the Oval Office of the White House in Washington, D.C.
- Executive Order 13799 in the Federal Register
- Type: Executive order
- Number: 13799
- President: Donald Trump
- Signed: May 11, 2017

Federal Register details
- Federal Register document number: 2017-10003
- Publication date: May 16, 2017

Summary
- Identify rules and laws that enhance and undermine the integrity of the election process; Vice President chairs the Commission; Up to fifteen additional members; Other provisions

The Presidential Advisory Commission on Election Integrity (PEIC or PACEI), also called the Voter Fraud Commission, was a presidential commission established by Donald Trump that ran from May 11, 2017, to January 3, 2018. The Trump administration said the commission would review claims of voter fraud, improper registration, and voter suppression. The establishment of the commission followed Trump's false claim that millions of illegal immigrants had voted in the 2016 presidential election, costing him the popular vote. Vice President Mike Pence was chosen as chair of the commission and Kansas secretary of state Kris Kobach was its vice chair and day-to-day administrator.

On June 28, 2017, Kobach, in conjunction with the Department of Justice, asked every state for personal voter information. The request was met with significant bipartisan backlash; 44 states and the District of Columbia declined to supply some or all of the information, citing privacy concerns or state laws.

Trump's creation of the commission was criticized by voting rights advocates, scholars and experts, and newspaper editorial boards as a pretext for, and prelude to, voter suppression. At least eight lawsuits were filed accusing the Commission of violating the law.

On January 3, 2018, Trump abruptly disbanded the commission; he stated the claims of election fraud and cited many states' refusal to turn over information as well as the pending lawsuits. The commission found no evidence of voter fraud. At that time, Trump asked that the investigation be transferred to the U.S. Department of Homeland Security (DHS), which already holds much of the requested state voter data and oversees immigration records. The acting DHS press secretary said that Kobach would not be advising or working with DHS, and the White House said it would destroy all the state voter data collected by the commission.

== Background ==
=== 2016 campaign ===
During his campaign for president, Trump made numerous false claims of voter fraud occurring in the United States.

In the weeks before the election, Trump urged his supporters to volunteer as poll watchers on Election Day, saying they were needed to guard against "voter fraud" and a "rigged" outcome. The rhetoric was seen by some as a call to intimidate minority voters or challenge their credentials to prevent them from voting. Numerous organizations, including the Democratic Party officials and affiliates sued Trump accusing him of voter intimidation, in violation of the 1965 Voting Rights Act and the 1871 Ku Klux Klan Act.

=== Post-election ===
On November 8, 2016, Trump won the 2016 United States presidential election, but lost the popular vote to opponent Hillary Clinton by about 2.9 million votes. Trump falsely claimed that he won the popular vote "if you deduct the millions of people who voted illegally" and that three to five million people voted illegally in the 2016 election.

==== Kris Kobach proposal ====
On November 22, 2016, Kobach met with then president-elect Trump in his Trump National Golf Club in Bedminster, New Jersey in consideration for Secretary of Homeland Security position. The Associated Press photographed Kobach taking into his meeting with Trump a document entitled "Department of Homeland Security, Kobach Strategic Plan for First 365 Days" referencing a possible amendment to the National Voter Registration Act of 1993.

The American Civil Liberties Union, representing plaintiffs in a voting rights case, asked the federal judge to prevent Kobach from withholding from the public documents he presented to Trump by virtue of marking them "confidential". The plaintiffs demanded the public release of those documents that had been prepared with state funds, claiming Kobach "made statements to the public, the Court, and the president, suggesting that noncitizen registration fraud is a serious, widespread problem," while at the same time trying to hide those same documents that reject his claim, to prevent having to testify in open court about those materials. In June 2017, the federal magistrate judge found that Kobach had made "patently misleading representations" to the court in the course of the document dispute. Kobach was fined $1,000 for "deceptive conduct and lack of candor" and ordered to submit to questioning under oath by the ACLU about the documents and about a draft amendment to the National Voter Registration Act "which would have added a line to the federal voter law that said states could request any information from voters they deem necessary."

=== Voter irregularities in the United States ===
==== Voter impersonation ====
Only US citizens have the right to vote in federal elections. While the United States Congress has jurisdiction over laws applying to federal elections, it has deferred the making of most aspects of election laws to the states. Therefore, the administration of voter registration requirements, voting requirements, and elections vary widely across jurisdictions.

Voter impersonation (also sometimes called in-person voter fraud) is a form of electoral fraud in which a person who is eligible to vote in an election votes more than once, or a person who is not eligible to vote does so by voting under the name of an eligible voter. In the United States, voter ID laws have been enacted in a number of states since 2010 with the aim of preventing voter impersonation. Research has shown that voter impersonation is extremely rare. There is no evidence that in-person voter fraud has changed the result of any election.

In a few cases, permanent residents ("green card" holders) have registered to vote and have cast ballots without realizing that doing so was illegal. Non-citizens convicted in criminal court of having made a false claim of citizenship for the purpose of registering to vote in a federal election can be fined and imprisoned for up to a year. Deportation and removal proceedings have resulted from several such cases.

In an analysis by the Brennan Center for Justice at the New York University School of Law looked at 42 jurisdictions, focusing on ones with large population of noncitizens. Of 23.5 million votes surveyed, election officials referred an estimated 30 incidents of suspected noncitizen voting for further investigation, or about 0.0001% of votes cast. Douglas Keith, the counsel in the Brennan Center's Democracy Program and co-author of the analysis, said, "President Trump has said repeatedly that millions of people voted illegally in 2016, but our interviews with local election administrators made clear that rampant noncitizen voting simply did not occur. Any claims to the contrary make their job harder and distract from progress toward needed improvements like automatic voter registration."

==== Voter registration irregularities ====
Voter registration is the process of collecting applications to vote, adjudicating those applications, and maintaining the rolls of qualified voters. The process of voter registration is generally left to the states. In an effort to increase voter turnout, a state may adopt less restrictive policies, including motor voter registration and same day registration. In an effort to decrease in-person voter fraud, a state may adopt stricter policies for registration, including proof of citizenship at the time of registration. Federal elections do not require proof of citizenship, only a statement on the signed application.

Voter rolls may include erroneous superfluous entries as a result of fraudulent registration, or of failure to purge the roll when a voter dies, moves, or is sent to prison. A qualified voter may be legally registered in only one precinct. This is a matter of state law. In 2012, the Pew Trust estimated that 24 million voter records were inaccurate or invalid, including approximately 1.8 million records of deceased people who remained on voter rolls. In October 2016, Trump conflated these irregularities with voter fraud and wrongly cited the Pew report as evidence that 1.8 million people were fraudulently voting against him. Voting twice is a third degree felony in most states. Superfluous entries on a voter roll do not affect elections. (Note: Erroneously voting using the superfluous entry instead of one's true registration entry does not impact the outcome of an election. Example 1: A person uses the mail in ballot of his deceased wife rather than his own to cast a vote. Example 2: A person owns two homes, is registered to vote in both homes, but only votes once. This is not uncommon. (For reference, see "Why Are So Many People Registered to Vote in Multiple States?". Pacific Standard. January 27, 2017.))

Erroneous deletions from a voter roll can potentially affect an election outcome by preventing qualified voters from casting ballots. In November 2016, the New York City Board of Elections was ordered by a federal judge to make affidavit ballots available to people who believed their registrations were improperly purged. A computer analysis by The Palm Beach Post found that at least 1,100 eligible voters were wrongly purged from the Florida Central Voter File before the 2000 US presidential election, causing some eligible voters to be turned away at polling stations. Some commentators and courts have concluded that improperly conducted purges affect political parties differently and disenfranchise racial minorities. For instance, the 2000 Florida purge led to thousands of voters being wrongly disenfranchised, a disproportionate number of them black.

== Commission ==
The Presidential Advisory Commission on Election Integrity was a temporary commission established by President Donald Trump's executive order (E.O. 13799, 82 FR 22389) on May 11, 2017. White House Press Secretary Sarah Huckabee Sanders said the commission would provide the president with a report on their findings by 2018.

Provisions:

- Vice president shall chair the commission
- President appoints members to the commission, the vice president may select the vice chair
- The commission will report on laws, rules, policies, activities, strategies, and practices that enhance and undermine people's confidence in the integrity of the voting processes used in federal elections
- The report should also identify voting systems and practices used for federal elections that could lead to improper voter registrations and improper voting, including fraudulent voter registrations and fraudulent voting
- The commission will terminate 30 days after it submits its report to the president

=== Members ===
Commission members at time of disbandment

- Chair: Mike Pence, Republican, Vice President of the United States, former Governor of Indiana
- Vice Chair: Kris Kobach, Republican, Secretary of State of Kansas, Of Counsel, Immigration Reform Law Institute
- J. Christian Adams, Republican, former Department of Justice Civil Rights Division attorney
- Ken Blackwell, Republican, former Ohio Secretary of State and previously state Treasurer
- Matthew Dunlap, Democrat, Secretary of State of Maine
- Bill Gardner, Democrat, New Hampshire Secretary of State
- Alan Lamar King, Democrat, probate judge of Jefferson County, Alabama
- Connie Lawson, Republican, Secretary of State of Indiana
- Christy McCormick, Republican, Commissioner of the Election Assistance Commission
- Mark Rhodes, Democrat, Wood County, West Virginia county clerk
- Hans von Spakovsky, Republican, former member Federal Election Commission, senior legal fellow, The Heritage Foundation and director, Public Interest Legal Foundation

Commission who left prior to disbandment

- Luis Borunda, Republican, Maryland deputy secretary of state, resigned July 3, 2017 (prior to the commission's first meeting, but after the controversial letter by Kris Kobach to election officials in the different states)
- David K. Dunn, Democrat, former Arkansas state representative, died October 17, 2017

Vice President Pence has been described as the titular head of the Commission on Voter Integrity with Kris Kobach, who also serves on the elections committee of the National Secretaries of States Association (NSOS), as its operational leader. According to the executive order, the commission can have up to sixteen members.

Dunlap and Gardner, the two Democratic secretaries of state on the commission, said they hoped the commission would look into Russian interference in the 2016 election, but Kobach said he did not think that the commission's investigation would go in that direction.

Unlike past presidential commissions on elections and voting (such as the Carter-Baker in 2001, Carter-Ford in 2004, and Bauer-Ginsburg in 2013), the leadership of the panel is not bipartisan and the makeup of the panel is not evenly split. Rather, Pence and Kobach, the chair and vice chair of the commission, are both Republicans, and Republicans hold a 7 to 5 (originally 8 to 5) advantage in membership for the commission as a whole. The ratio favoring the Republicans increased to 7 to 4 when David K. Dunn died in October 2017. Also in October 2017, two of the four Democrats on the commission, Dunlap and King, sent separate letters to commission staff complaining that they are not being kept informed of commission activities.

Commission member Hans von Spakovsky, director of The Heritage Foundation's Election Law Reform Initiative, is said to have promoted "the myth that Democratic voter fraud is common, and that it helps Democrats win elections" according to a magazine article in The New Yorker. He has supported his claims about the extent of voter fraud by citing a 2000 investigation by the Atlanta Journal-Constitution, which purported to find 5400 instances of deceased people in Georgia voting in the last twenty years. The Journal-Constitution later revised its findings, noting that it had no evidence of even a single ballot purportedly being cast by a deceased person and that the vast majority of the instances in question were due to clerical errors. In an interview with the New Yorker, von Spakovsky cited two scholars who he said could substantiate that voter-impersonation fraud was rampant: Robert Pastor of American University and Larry Sabato of the University of Virginia. Pastor and Sabato both said they would only support voter ID laws if those IDs were issued without cost to the voters, and acquired without substantial difficulty.

It is Sabato's belief that voter impersonation is "relatively rare today," yet in a 2011 Heritage Foundation article, von Spakovsky referred to Sabato once more as a researcher whose studies established the existence of widespread voter fraud. He also has cited conservative columnist John Fund's Stealing Elections, a book whose assertions of election fraud have been extensively debunked. Fund also co-authored a book with von Spakovsky. In an email, von Spakovsky urged Trump's Attorney General Jeff Sessions not to appoint any Democrats, "moderate Republicans and/or academics" to the commission. According to Richard L. Hasen, an election-law expert at the University of California at Irvine, "there are number of people who have been active in promoting false and exaggerated claims of voter fraud and using that as a pretext to argue for stricter voting and registration rules. And von Spakovsky is at the top of the list." Hasen said that Trump's appointment of Spakovsky's was "a big middle finger" to people who are "serious about fixing problems with our elections."

One of Trump's appointees to the commission, Ken Blackwell, was Ohio Secretary of State for two terms beset with controversy, lawsuits, and accusations that he had created impediments to voting. During the 2004 presidential election, Blackwell attempted to throw out voter registrations in Ohio that were not printed on "white, uncoated paper of not less than 80-pound text weight" (a heavy card-stock paper) and the 2004 election in the state was marred by "controversies over topics ranging from voting devices to long lines on Election Day." Blackwell revoked the order after county clerks said it was unnecessary, and voting rights advocates called in any attempt at voter suppression. Also in 2004, Blackwell ordered clerks to toss out provisional ballots cast in the wrong precinct, a policy criticized by voting rights advocates but ultimately permitted by a federal appeals court. In March 2006, Blackwell's office also inadvertently released the Social Security numbers of 5.7 million voters.

== Commission activity ==
=== 2017 request for voter information ===
==== First request ====
On June 28, 2017, Kris Kobach, in his capacity as vice chair of the commission, wrote a letter along with the Department of Justice to the top election official in every state requesting they turn over voter data ostensibly to aid a countrywide search for evidence of election irregularities. Besides information such as the names, addresses and party affiliations of all registered voters, Kobach sought birth dates, felony conviction records, voting histories for the past decade and the last four digits of all voters' Social Security numbers. Many states' election officials claim they never received the request and some said they only forward the request from another state's secretary of state.

The letter was not made public, and it became publicly known only after Vanita Gupta, president and CEO of the Leadership Conference on Civil and Human Rights, tweeted out an image of the letter the day after the letter was written. Along with the image of the letter, she wrote "Pence and Kobach are laying the groundwork for voter suppression, plain & simple." A few hours after Gupta's tweet, Kobach confirmed to The Kansas City Star that the letter was authentic.

Kobach provided an e-mail address and a website for the election official to electronically submit the personal voter data. The e-mail address lacked basic encryption technology and was found to be insecure.

The request may have violated the federal Paperwork Reduction Act because it was not submitted to the Office of Information and Regulatory Affairs (OIRA) prior to being made to the states. The submission to the OIRA would have required a justification and an explanation of how the data would be used and protected. Additionally, the request did not come with an estimate of how many hours it would take the states to respond. Regulatory experts opined that the consequence of a violation would be that states would not be required to respond.

In January 2018, it was reported that the commission had, in its requests for Texas voter data, specifically asked for data that identifies voters with Hispanic surnames.

==== Second request ====
On July 25, 2017, Kobach told the Kansas City Star that he intended to send another request for voter data, after receiving a favorable ruling in a lawsuit filed by the Electronic Privacy Information Center. The court had ruled against the center's motion to stop the commission from trying to collect the data, stating that the commission had only made a request, not a demand or an attempt to force. The letter was sent the following day, and it differed from the first request by the addition "if state law allows [the] information to be public". The California Secretary of State announced that it would refuse to comply with the second request.

==== State responses ====
There was an immediate bipartisan backlash and rejection of the inquiries with a majority of states quickly rejecting the requests. Notably, commissioners Kobach, Dunlap, and Lawson (who also serve as the secretaries of state for Kansas, Maine, and Indiana respectively, with Indiana being Mike Pence's home state) indicated that their state laws forbade them from complying. Some states offered to only provide information that is already made public or available for purchase. No state has said they will fully comply with the list of demands. In response, Trump made a statement on Twitter, "Numerous states are refusing to give information to the very distinguished VOTER FRAUD PANEL. What are they trying to hide?"

Responses by election officials of the various states
State	Officeholder	Party	Received request?	Official response	Notes
Alabama	John Merrill	Republican	Yes	Will sell public information	
Alaska	Byron Mallott	Democratic	Yes	Will provide public information	
Arizona	Michele Reagan	Republican	Yes	Will not comply	
Arkansas	Mark Martin	Republican	Yes	Will provide public information	
California	Alex Padilla	Democratic	Yes	Will not comply	
Colorado	Wayne Williams	Republican	Yes	Will provide public information	
Connecticut	Denise Merrill	Democratic	Yes	Will not comply	Initially planned to comply with state allowed public information.
Delaware	Jeffrey Bullock	Democratic	Yes	Will not comply	
District of Columbia	Lauren Vaughan	Democratic	Yes	Will not comply	
Florida	Ken Detzner	Republican	Yes	Will provide public information	
Georgia	Brian Kemp	Republican	Yes	Will sell public information	$250
Hawaii	Shan Tsutsui	Democratic	No	—N/a	
Idaho	Lawerence Denney	Republican	Yes	In review	
Illinois	Jesse White	Democratic	Yes	Will not comply	Will not provide private information
Indiana	Connie Lawson	Republican	Yes	Will provide public information	Mike Pence's home state
Iowa	Paul Pate	Republican	Yes	Will sell public information	
Kansas	Kris Kobach	Republican	Yes	Will provide public information	Vice Chair of Commission
Kentucky	Alison Grimes	Democratic	Yes	Will not comply	
Louisiana	Tom Schedler	Republican	Yes	Will sell public information	
Maine	Matthew Dunlap	Democratic	Yes	Will not comply	Member of Commission. Initially planned to comply with state allowed public information.
Maryland	John Wobensmith	Republican	Yes	Will not comply	Against state law.
Massachusetts	William Galvin	Democratic	Yes	Will not comply	
Michigan	Ruth Johnson	Republican	Yes	Will provide public information	
Minnesota	Steve Simon	Democratic	Yes	Will not comply	
Mississippi	Delbert Hosemann	Republican	No, but forwarded	Will not comply	
Missouri	Jay Ashcroft	Republican	Yes	Will provide public information	
Montana	Corey Stapleton	Republican	No	—N/a	Plans to not comply
Nebraska	John Gale	Republican	Yes	Will not comply	Will not comply until more details are received.
Nevada	Barbara Cegavske	Republican	Yes	Will provide public information	
New Hampshire	Bill Gardner	Democratic	Yes	Will provide public information	Commission member
New Jersey	Kim Guadagno	Republican	Yes	In review	
New Mexico	Maggie Toulouse Oliver	Democratic	No, but forwarded	Will not comply	
New York	Cesar Perales	Democratic	Yes	Will not comply	
North Carolina	Elaine Marshall	Democratic	Yes	Will provide public information	Governor Roy Cooper requested that the State Board of Elections not comply
North Dakota	Al Jaeger	Republican	Yes	Will not comply	North Dakota is the only state without voter registration.
Ohio	Jon Husted	Republican	Yes	Will provide public information	
Oklahoma	Dave Lopez	Republican	Yes	Will provide public information	
Oregon	Dennis Richardson	Republican	Yes	Will sell public information	$500 purchase
Pennsylvania	Pedro Cortés	Democratic	Yes	Will not "actively" comply	Commission may make public purchase of $20
Rhode Island	Nellie Gorbea	Democratic	Yes	Will provide public information	Called Kris Kobach oversight over the Commission "deeply troubling"
South Carolina	Mark Hammond	Republican	No, but forwarded	Will provide public information	
South Dakota	Shantel Krebs	Republican	Yes	Will not comply	
Tennessee	Tre Hargett	Republican	Yes	Will not comply	
Texas	Rolando Pablos	Republican	Yes	Will provide public information	
Utah	Spencer Cox	Republican	Yes	Will provide public information	
Vermont	Jim Condos	Democratic	Yes	Will not comply	Initially planned to comply with state allowed public information, but wants to be assured data will be secured
Virginia	Kelly Thomasson	Democratic	Yes	Will not comply	Governor Terry McAuliffe gave official answer.
Washington	Kim Wyman	Republican	Yes	Will not "actively" comply	Commission may access public portal
West Virginia	Mac Warner	Republican	Yes	Will sell public information	$1,000
Wisconsin	Doug La Follette	Democratic	Yes	Will sell public information	$12,500
Wyoming	Ed Murray	Republican	Yes	Will not comply	

==== Impact on voter registration ====
In Colorado, the Secretary of State confirmed that 3,394 voters (0.09 percent of all registered voters in Colorado) cancelled their voter registration in response to the request for voter registration information sent out by Kris Kobach. After receiving a few requests for voter registration cancellations, election officials in Flagler County, Florida published an open letter to voters urging voters not to cancel their registration in response to the commission's request for voter information. In Arkansas, an alderwoman in Eureka Springs requested to cancel her voter registration, but then re-registered within 24 hours because the law requires her to be a registered voter in order to serve in an elected office.

=== First official meeting, July 19, 2017 ===
The committee held its first official meeting on July 19, 2017, in Washington D.C. Breaking with tradition of open meetings for such commissions, the meeting was not open to the public, but it was live streamed in lieu. Trump addressed the commission at its inaugural meeting and criticized states that did not comply with the request for data issued by Kobach (saying "One has to wonder what they're worried about"). The committee members talked largely of voter fraud, and mentioned themes included 'One Citizen, One Vote', anecdotes about specific incidents of election misconduct, and additional funding for voting equipment.

=== New Hampshire meeting, September 12, 2017 ===
On August 24, 2017, the White House announced that the commission would meet on September 12, 2017, at St. Anselm College near Manchester, New Hampshire. In February, Trump had told a meeting of senators that he lost New Hampshire because thousands of people had been brought in from Massachusetts on buses to vote, a claim disputed by the state's two senators, an FEC commissioner, and Bill Gardner, New Hampshire's secretary of state and later a member of the integrity commission. On September 7, Kobach alleged in his Breitbart News column that voter fraud had "likely" swung the election in the New Hampshire 2016 presidential race and 2016 Senate race. Kobach wrote that while "anecdotally" it was well known that out-of-state voters take advantage of New Hampshire's same-day registration law to come in on Election Day and vote, "Now there's proof": of the 6,540 voters who had registered to vote on Election Day using out-of-state driver's licenses as identification, only 1,014 of those voters had obtained a New Hampshire driver's license by August 30, 2017. The rest never obtained a New Hampshire license and only a few had registered vehicles in the state, leaving 5,513, "a big number - more than enough to swing two very important elections." Kobach, calling all 5,513 of the votes "fraudulent votes", wrote that in the senate race, "if 59.2% or more of them went for Hassan, then the election was stolen by voter fraud" and "if 74.8% of the fraudulent votes were cast for Clinton, then the presidential election was tipped as well." Another commission member, J. Christian Adams, published a similar op-ed at PJ Media on the same day, stating that "the overwhelming majority of them [the 5,513 voters] can no longer be found in New Hampshire." Kobach and Adams based the allegations on statistics reported by Shawn Jasper, Republican speaker of the New Hampshire House of Representatives. The statistics were released to Jasper by Secretary of State Gardner and the commissioner of the state department of safety in response to his request. A spokesman for the speaker said that the statistics were raw data and that Jasper "did not know which states issued the 6,540 licenses and acknowledged that the numbers could include some college students." The Washington Post, noting that Kobach apparently had not tried to contact voters with out-of-state ID for his Breitbart article, was able to quickly contact three voters who did not obtain New Hampshire driver's licenses. The three said that they were college students and had used the driver's licenses from their home states as their identification. The day after Kobach's op-ed was published, the New Hampshire congressional delegation unanimously urged Gardner to resign, so as to deny the commission the appearance of credibility. Gardner said it was his civic duty to remain.

The meeting was hosted by Gardner and chaired by Vice Chair Kobach, since the chairman, Mike Pence, would not be in attendance. At the meeting, both Gardner and fellow commissioner and Maine Secretary of State Matthew Dunlap rejected the allegation that voter fraud affected the election in New Hampshire in 2016. Dunlap called the charge "reckless" and pointed out that voters in New Hampshire need not be residents of the state to vote, as it is sufficient to be "domiciled" in the state. Dunlap said, "I think it's really reckless to make an allegation like that based on how I know licenses are issued around the country and how elections are conducted. It's an amazing leap to make."

The meeting continued for six hours, during which time Kobach answered questions for thirty minutes. He told reporters, "If you drive in and then drive out on the same day, that is fraudulent....My point is that among the 5,313, you can probably assume that at least one of those individuals" voted fraudulently. When reminded that he had written "Now there's proof", he said, "I think when you have 5,300 cases, it's virtual proof that at least one of those individuals probably didn't stay." He added, "Let's just get the numbers and see where the numbers take us, and I certainly don't have any preconceived notions about that issue or a whole host of issues."

John Lott, president of the Crime Prevention Research Center, made a presentation to the commission, proposing that the National Instant Criminal Background Check System be used for voter verification. Dunlap responded by saying the system "was never intended to be used as an elections tool" and using it as such would have "unintended consequences".

== Response ==
Rick Hasen of the University of California, Irvine, an expert on election law, stated that the commission was "a pretext to pass legislation that will make it harder for people to register to vote" and that there could be no confidence in whatever the committee produced. In a June 2017 editorial, Hasen ridiculed the commission as a "faux commission".

=== Lawsuits ===
At least eight lawsuits were filed challenging the commission, alleging that its activities violated the law. Five of the plaintiffs in the different lawsuits were non-profit organizations that included: the American Civil Liberties Union (ACLU v. Trump and Pence and Joyner v. Presidential Advisory Commission on Election Integrity), the Lawyers' Committee for Civil Rights Under Law, NAACP (NAACP v. Trump), Public Citizen, and the Electronic Privacy Information Center. The lawsuits by the first two groups involved the lack of transparency of the commission's meetings, whereas the lawsuits by the last two groups involved the collection by the commission of personal private data. In addition to the lawsuits, complaints have been filed with federal agencies against two of the commission's members.

In response to the lawsuit filed by the Electronic Privacy Information Center, the commission abandoned plans to accept responses through the Department of Defense safe access file exchange website and announced plans to use an existing White House system. The commission asked states to refrain from submitting data while the case was pending. The commission also stated its intention of deleting voter information from Arkansas, the only state to officially submit voter data on the Department of Defense website. On July 24, Judge Colleen Kollar-Kotelly denied EPIC's request for a temporary restraining order and preliminary injunction against the commission, ruling that the commission was not required to conduct a privacy review before gathering data. On August 29, the government's attorney told the judge that confusion at the Department of Justice had resulted in the failure to disclose relevant documents to the plaintiffs, and Kollar-Kotelly ordered the government to provide a list of documents it wanted to withhold, and how it would comply with disclosure rules.

In November 2017, Maine Secretary of State Matthew Dunlap, a Democratic member of the commission, said that Kobach was refusing to share working documents and scheduling information with him and the other Democrats on the commission. He filed suit, and in December a federal judge ordered the commission to hand over the documents. Two weeks later, in January 2018, Trump disbanded the commission, and his administration informed Dunlap that it would not obey the court order to provide the documents because the commission no longer existed. On August 3, 2018, Dunlap wrote that the documents available to him did not support claims of widespread voter fraud. He described the investigation as the "most bizarre thing I've ever been a part of....After reading this, I see that it wasn't just a matter of investigating President Trump's claims that three to five million people voted illegally, but the goal of the commission seems to have been to validate those claims."

In January 2018, in the Joyner case, the Department of Justice disclosed that the White House would not be turning over any state voter data to the Department of Homeland Security, despite the White House's and Kris Kobach's earlier statements to the contrary.

=== Calls for defunding and disbandment ===
On June 22, 2017, Representative Marc Veasey of Texas's 33rd congressional district introduced H.R. 3029 to deny funding for the commission. In August 2017, Senate Minority leader Chuck Schumer wrote an editorial calling on Trump to disband the commission. He also threatened that if Trump did not disband the commission, he would try to deny the commission money in a funding bill.

== Disbanding ==
On January 3, 2018, two weeks after the court order instructing the commission to share its working documents with its Democratic members, the Trump administration disbanded the commission. The panel disbanded without making any findings of fraud.

In announcing that he had dissolved the commission, Trump blamed states for not handing over requested voter information to the commission, and still maintained that there was "substantial evidence of voter fraud". Press secretary Sarah Huckabee Sanders said in a statement that "rather than engage in endless legal battles at taxpayer expense," Trump abolished the panel and turned the matter over to the Department of Homeland Security. Election integrity experts argued that the commission was disbanded because of the lawsuits, which would have led to greater transparency and accountability in the commission and thus prevented the Republican members of the commission from producing a sham report to justify restrictions on voting rights, and that oversight by a cabinet-level agency such as DHS could preclude open meetings and requests for compliance with public records laws.

== Transfer to Department of Homeland Security ==
After Trump shut down the commission, Kobach pointed out in an interview that "DHS knows the identity of everyone who has green cards" and temporary visas, and that to compare those names to state voter rolls would be "immensely valuable." He stated, "This is a tactical shift by the president who remains very committed to finding the scope of voter fraud." He told several interviewers that he would "be working closely with the White House and DHS to ensure the investigations continue," but the acting DHS press secretary said that Kobach would not be advising or working with the department. On January 9, the director of White House information technology stated, in a declaration appended to a motion in Commissioner Dunlap's suit against the commission, that the state voter data the commission had collected would not be sent to DHS or any other agency except the National Archives and Records Administration (NARA), pursuant to federal law and pending the outcome of lawsuits, and that pursuant to federal law and upon consultation with NARA the White House intended to destroy all the state voter data held by the dissolved Commission. The DHS already has access to the state voter data the commission requested from the states. Voting rights and civil rights advocates were alarmed at moves by the Trump administration to task the DHS with fighting "voter fraud" despite multiple studies showing that voter fraud is virtually nonexistent in the U.S., fearing that Trump's directive would give impetus to purges of eligible voters from the voter rolls.

== See also ==
- Attempts to overturn the 2020 United States presidential election
- Election integrity in the United States
- Voter registration in the United States
- Voting rights in the United States
- Voter suppression in the United States
