= Election integrity in the United States =

Security and fairness of U.S. elections

In the United States, election integrity refers to the policies, practices and public debates about how U.S. elections are run and secured. Political scientists use a related term "electoral integrity" that evaluates elections to international standards from voter registration to the certification of results. In U.S. politics, "election integrity" is mostly used by Republican officials and allied organizations. They use it as a framework to justify proposals like stricter voter ID laws, proof of citizenship in order to register to vote, removing names from voter rolls, and limits on mail voting.

Supporters say these rules stop fraud and strengthen voters confidence in the election process. Critics, including election officials, voting rights groups and researchers, have pushed back. They note that proven fraud is rare and do not merit the interventions of these rules specially because most often these measures make voting harder for eligible voters. Many also believe that claims of widespread fraud after the 2020 presidential election hurt public trust in the electoral system of the United States.

== Terminology ==
Political scientists studying elections internationally use "electoral integrity" for elections conducted according to international standards and global norms during the pre-election period, the campaign, polling day and its aftermath. The Electoral Integrity Project, founded by Pippa Norris, measures this through expert surveys. In its 2016 global index, the United States ranked 52nd of 153 countries and last among Western democracies. For example, they gave low scores to North Carolina's district boundaries, election laws and voter registration.

In U.S politics, the phrase is used more narrowly and what that means is disputed. Similar efforts in earlier decades were usually called "ballot security" or were described as removal of "illegally registered" voters. After 2020, the Republican party started to use "election integrity" as part of their campaign. For example, in the 2021 Virginia gubernatorial race, analysts noted candidates used "election integrity" to show they sided with Donald Trump without repeating his specific claims of fraud. Candidate Glenn Youngkin described it as an issue "raised by both parties for 10 years". A group of political scientists writing for the American Political Science Association argued that the term used to mean that the voting process was "transparent, fair, and accurate" for every eligible voter, and now leans toward treating election mistakes as crimes. They continued to argue that this reframing and rapid electoral law changes was going to result in fear and confusion in voters.

== History ==
=== Ballot security and voter challenges, 1950s–1980s ===
During and after the civil rights movement, private groups and party organizations cited voter fraud and improper registration as grounds for challenging voters. Courts and researchers later found that several of these efforts were aimed mainly at Black and Latino voters.

In September 1956, members of two Citizens' Councils in Bienville Parish, Louisiana, voted to purge the parish rolls of "illegally registered" voters. Working after hours with the parish registrar, they challenged about 570 Black voters, roughly 95 percent of those registered, and 35 white voters. A federal court later found that about 80 percent of white registration cards had the same or similar errors as the cards used to challenge Black voters. All 570 Black voters were removed, and by 1960 the parish had 26 Black registered voters. In 1961 the court ruled that the purge discriminated on the basis of race and ordered the removed voters restored.

In 1964 the Republican National Committee ran Operation Eagle Eye, a national program to stop voter fraud. It sent 1.8 million letters to voters in what it called "suspect precincts" in 15 cities with large minority populations, and it used undelivered letters as a basis for challenges. Program officials said at least 2,963 names had been purged in Chicago before the election. The national director said he expected 1.25 million people to be challenged or discouraged from voting.

In the 1981 New Jersey governor's race, the RNC's Ballot Security Task Force mailed letters to voters in mostly Black and Latino neighborhoods and turned about 45,000 undelivered letters into a challenge list. On Election Day it posted armed, off-duty police officers at polling places in Black and Hispanic neighborhoods of Newark and Trenton. The Democratic National Committee sued. In 1982 the RNC agreed to a consent decree barring ballot security activities in which race or ethnicity was a factor. The decree stayed in place until a federal judge let it expire in January 2018.

In 1986 the RNC sent nonforwardable letters to 350,000 voters in heavily Democratic, mostly Black districts of Louisiana. An internal RNC memo said the program "could keep the black vote down considerably." A state judge stopped the program, finding that its intent was to remove Black voters from the rolls. In 1988 Assembly candidate Curt Pringle and the Orange County Republican Party posted uniformed guards at polling places in heavily Latino neighborhoods of Santa Ana, California. The guards carried signs in Spanish and English saying that only citizens could vote. Pringle and the county party later paid $400,000 to settle a civil rights suit brought by Latino voters, without admitting wrongdoing. In 1989 California made it a felony to post guards at polling places without election officials' permission.

=== 2000–2016 ===
The disputed 2000 presidential election led to the Help America Vote Act of 2002. The act set federal standards for voting equipment and statewide voter registration databases and created the Election Assistance Commission. Through the 2000s, states began adopting voter identification requirements. In Crawford v. Marion County Election Board (2008), the Supreme Court upheld Indiana's photo ID law. In Shelby County v. Holder (2013), the Court struck down the formula that determined which jurisdictions needed federal preclearance under the Voting Rights Act of 1965, allowing several states to put new voting rules into effect without federal review. In January 2017 the Department of Homeland Security designated election systems as critical infrastructure.

=== Presidential Advisory Commission on Election Integrity ===
In May 2017 President Trump created the Presidential Advisory Commission on Election Integrity, chaired by Vice President Mike Pence with Kansas Secretary of State Kris Kobach as vice chair. The commission grew out of Trump's claim that millions of people had voted illegally in 2016, a claim that was never substantiated. Many states refused its request for voter data, and it faced several lawsuits. Trump dissolved it on January 3, 2018, before it issued a final report. The White House cited state noncompliance and litigation costs.

=== 2020 election and aftermath ===
On November 12, 2020, the Election Infrastructure Government Coordinating Council, which works under the Cybersecurity and Infrastructure Security Agency, issued a joint statement calling the election "the most secure in American history". It said there was no evidence that any voting system had been compromised and noted that all states with close presidential results had paper records of each vote. Trump and his allies continued to claim the election had been stolen. These claims, rejected by courts and election officials, are covered in Attempts to overturn the 2020 United States presidential election and Election denial movement in the United States.

Many states passed new election laws in 2021 and 2022. Georgia's Election Integrity Act of 2021 (SB 202), signed by Governor Brian Kemp on March 25, 2021, replaced signature matching for absentee ballots with ID requirements, changed rules for drop boxes, added requirements related to early-voting days, prohibited outside groups from giving food or water to voters in line, and restructured the State Election Board. Kemp called it a step "toward ensuring our elections are secure, accessible and fair"; Democrats and voting rights groups criticized it as restrictive. In 2022 Florida created an Office of Election Crimes and Security. In August 2022 Governor Ron DeSantis announced the arrest of 20 people accused of voting while ineligible because of murder or sexual-offense convictions. Critics questioned whether the defendants knew they were ineligible after the passage of Amendment 4. By the end of 2022, judges had dismissed at least three of the cases, in each case because the statewide prosecutor lacked jurisdiction over offenses confined to a single county.

=== 2024 election ===
Ahead of the 2024 election, the Republican National Committee launched an "election integrity" program to recruit poll watchers, poll workers and attorneys in swing states. It set a goal of 100,000 volunteers and placed election integrity directors in 15 states. Critics said the effort could lead to harassment of election workers. The RNC later said it had recruited more than 230,000 volunteers and was involved in more than 100 election lawsuits.

=== Second Trump administration ===
On March 25, 2025, Trump signed Executive Order 14248, "Preserving and Protecting the Integrity of American Elections". Among other provisions, it directed the Election Assistance Commission to require documentary proof of citizenship on the federal voter registration form. On April 24, 2025, Judge Colleen Kollar-Kotelly of the U.S. District Court for the District of Columbia blocked that provision. On October 31, 2025, she made the block permanent, ruling that the power to change the federal form belongs to the bipartisan Election Assistance Commission and not the president. The ruling partially settled suits brought by Democrats and voting rights groups, including the League of United Latin American Citizens, and the League of Women Voters. The White House said it would appeal. In a separate suit brought by Democratic state attorneys general, Judge Denise Casper of the District of Massachusetts issued a preliminary injunction in June 2025 and made it permanent on June 24, 2026, blocking both the proof-of-citizenship requirement and the order's demand that mail ballots arrive by Election Day.

The House of Representatives passed the SAVE Act, which would require documentary proof of citizenship to register for federal elections, by a vote of 220–208 on April 10, 2025. A revised version, the SAVE America Act, added photo ID requirements and passed the House 218–213 on February 11, 2026. In the Senate, Majority Leader John Thune said the bill lacked the votes to overcome a filibuster. An attempt to add key parts of it as an amendment to a budget reconciliation bill failed 48–50 in April 2026, with four Republican senators voting against it.

Starting in 2025, the Department of Justice asked states for complete voter registration lists, in some cases including driver's license and partial Social Security numbers, and sued states that refused. Attorney General Pam Bondi said, "Accurate voter rolls are the cornerstone of fair and free elections." Officials in several states declined to hand over confidential data, citing privacy concerns and the administration's stated plan to share it with the Department of Homeland Security. According to a tracker by Brennan Center for Justice, by October 2026 the department had sued 30 states and the District of Columbia. Courts had dismissed 27 of those suits, while at least 16 states had turned over full lists. On October 9, 2026, Judge Sparkle Sooknanan of the U.S. District Court in Washington ruled in a suit brought by Common Cause that the department's practice of checking state rolls against the SAVE database and demanding removals was unlawful, writing that the policy "represents the federal government's attempt to decide who gets to vote." In 2025 U.S. Citizenship and Immigration Services expanded its SAVE database so election offices could check voter rolls in bulk against Social Security records. By September 2025, 33 million voters had been run through the system. Some election officials welcomed the tool, while others raised concerns that USCIS had not published evidence of its accuracy. A federal judge ruled to block the database in June 2026, but the block was paused by the Supreme Court in September 2026, allowing use to continue. As of September 2026, 67 million voter registrations had gone through the system.

At the same time, the federal government reduced some election security programs. In February 2025 the Department of Homeland Security ended about $10 million in funding for the Elections Infrastructure Information Sharing and Analysis Center, which shared cybersecurity threat information with election offices. A White House spokesperson said its work no longer matched department priorities.

== Evidence on fraud ==
Studies have found that most kinds of voter fraud are rare in the United States. In 2014, law professor Justin Levitt identified about 31 credible incidents of in-person voter impersonation, the type of fraud photo ID laws address, among more than one billion ballots cast from 2000 to 2014. A 2021 study in the Quarterly Journal of Economics covering 2008 to 2018 found that strict voter ID laws had no significant effect on registration or turnout for any racial, gender, age or partisan group, and no effect on fraud, actual or perceived.

Supporters of stricter rules often cite the Heritage Foundation's Election Fraud Database, a collection of cases that ended in a conviction or official finding. A 2017 review by the Brennan Center for Justice said the 749 cases then listed went back decades, that only a handful involved noncitizen voting or impersonation at the polls, and that together they were "a molecular fraction of the total votes cast nationwide."

State reviews of noncitizen registration have also turned up small numbers. In October 2024 Iowa's secretary of state flagged 2,176 registrations as possibly belonging to noncitizens. After further checks the office lowered the figure to 277 in March 2025, and 35 of those people had cast ballots counted in the 2024 general election. An April 2025 audit in Michigan compared driving records with 7.2 million active registrations and found 16 apparent noncitizens who voted in 2024. The Center for Election Innovation & Research, which tracks these claims, found that none exceeded about one-tenth of one percent of a state's active registered voters, and that figures announced after an investigation were "invariably far smaller" than those announced before one.

== Public opinion ==
Confidence in elections has split along party lines. A Gallup poll in September 2024 found a record 56-point gap: 84% of Democrats and 28% of Republicans were confident that votes in that year's presidential election would be counted accurately. Republican confidence fell 16% between 2020 and 2024.

== See also ==
- Electoral fraud in the United States
- Election denial movement in the United States
- Voter suppression in the United States
