= Milton Lee =

Milton Lee may refer to:

- Milton A. Lee (1949–1968), United States Army soldier posthumously awarded the Medal of Honor
- Milton C. Lee (born 1960), American judge, chief judge of the Superior Court of the District of Columbia
- Milton L. Lee, American professor of chemistry

== See also ==
- Milton Lee Olive Park, a public park in Chicago, Illinois
