= American Civil Liberties Union v. Trump and Pence =

Litigation

- Court: United States District Court for the District of Columbia
- Full case name: American Civil Liberties Union Inc.; American Civil Liberties Union Foundation Inc. v. Donald J. Trump, in his official capacity as President of the United States of America; Michael Pence, in his official capacity as Vice President of the United States and chair of the Presidential Advisory Commission on Election Integrity
- Defendants: Donald Trump; Mike Pence; Presidential Advisory Commission on Election Integrity
- Counsel for plaintiffs: Theresa J. Lee; Sophia Lin Lakin; Dale E. Ho; Arthur B. Spitzer
- Plaintiffs: American Civil Liberties Union Inc; American Civil Liberties Union Foundation, Inc.
- Citation: No. 1:17-cv-01351

Court membership
- Judge sitting: Colleen Kollar-Kotelly

American Civil Liberties Union v. Trump and Pence, No. 1:17-cv-01351 (D.D.C. 2017), is a case before the United States District Court for the District of Columbia. The plaintiffs, the watchdog group American Civil Liberties Union (ACLU), alleged that the defendants, President Donald Trump and the Vice President Michael Pence, were in violation of the Federal Advisory Committee Act by establishing the Presidential Advisory Commission on Election Integrity for the purpose of supporting the President's "claim that he won the popular vote in the 2016 election—once millions of supposedly illegal votes are subtracted from the count."

Although the defendants were served immediately, because President Trump and Vice President Pence are being sued as elements of the United States government, no official action was required before September 8, 2017.

The case was dismissed without prejudice on July 22, 2020, after the Presidential Advisory Commission on Election Integrity was disbanded.

== Background ==
Kris Kobach had been the Secretary of State of Kansas since 2011 and was the Republican candidate for Governor of Kansas in the 2018 election.

On November 20, 2016, President Trump asked Kobach to co-chair a commission ("Pence-Kobach Commission" or "PAEC") to investigate possible voting irregularities in the 2016 Presidential Election. Kobach is a defendant in a parallel lawsuit filed by Electronic Privacy Information Center (EPIC).

On June 28, 2017, the Commission requested voter records from each of the states and the District of Columbia. Forty-four states rejected the request to deliver voter records On July 10, 2017, the Commission postponed its request of the states.

The United States Department of Justice represented Trump. The United States District Court for the District of Columbia judge was Colleen Kollar-Kotelly, formerly presiding judge of the United States Foreign Intelligence Surveillance Court (FISA).

According to the text of the complaint, the suit asked for relief in the nature of mandamus and declaratory judgement. The suit asked that the records of the previous meetings of the Presidential Advisory Commission on Election Integrity be made available to the public and that future meetings be open to the public.

== Specific allegations ==
- The Presidential Advisory Commission on Election Integrity ("Pence-Kobach Commission") violated the procedural requirements of the Federal Advisory Committee Act 5 U.S.C. app. 2 §§1-16
- The commission's membership was not "fairly balanced in terms of the points of view represented and the functions to be performed by the advisory committee"
- The "Commission was established for the purpose of providing a veneer of legitimacy to President Trump’s false claim that he won the popular vote in the 2016 election"

== Case developments ==
In anticipation of a government reply in September, the ACLU described certain recent actions of the Presidential Advisory Commission on Election Integrity which it contends were insufficient to meet its obligations specifically in respect to its planned meeting on July 19, 2017. President Trump opened the televised meeting of the PAEC on July 19, 2017.

On July 18, 2017, Judge Colleen Kollar-Kotelly rejected the ACLU's motion for a temporary restraining order and preliminary injunction, allowing the July 19 meeting to go on.

== See also ==
- List of lawsuits involving Donald Trump
- Federal Advisory Committee Act
