= J. Christian Adams =

American lawyer (born 1968)

Member of the United States Commission on Civil Rights
- Incumbent
- Assumed office August 13, 2020
- Appointed by: Donald Trump
- Preceded by: Karen Narasaki

Personal details
- Born: John Christian Adams; 1968 (age 57–58) Hempfield Township, Westmoreland County, Pennsylvania, U.S.
- Education: Hempfield Area High School; West Virginia University; University of South Carolina School of Law
- Occupation: Attorney; conservative activist
- Website: Official website

John Christian Adams (born 1968) is an American attorney and conservative activist serving as a member of the United States Commission on Civil Rights since 2020. A member of the Republican Party, he previously worked at the Department of Justice as a trial attorney from 2005 to 2010.

After leaving his position in 2010, Adams accused the department of racial bias in its handling of a voter intimidation case against members of the New Black Panther Party; an internal review by the DOJ concluded that charges of bias were without foundation.

He was a member of Donald Trump's election integrity commission which was intended to investigate claims of voter fraud. The establishment of the commission followed through on previous discredited claims by Trump that millions of illegal immigrants had voted in the 2016 United States presidential election, costing him the popular vote. The commission was disbanded less than a year after its creation without finding evidence of significant fraud.

== Career ==
Adams grew up in Hempfield Township in Westmoreland County, Pennsylvania and graduated from Hempfield Area High School. Adams received his Bachelor of Arts degree in English from West Virginia University, then his juris doctor from the University of South Carolina School of Law in 1993, and was admitted to the South Carolina Bar in 1994. From 1993 to 1997, Adams served as counsel for Jim Miles, the Secretary of State of South Carolina. In 1999, the Virginia State Bar admitted Adams.

The Washington Times noted in February 2001 that Adams filed a formal ethics complaint with the Florida Bar against Hugh Rodham, brother of then-U.S. Senator Hillary Clinton, that accused Rodham of violating bar regulations by representing people considered for presidential pardon from former president Bill Clinton, husband of Hillary Rodham Clinton. Citing United States Department of Justice confidentiality rules, the Florida Bar ruled that Hugh Rodham did not violate any rules. Adams responded to the Bar by emphasizing that his complaint accused Rodham of illegally taking a contingent fee to represent the two clients appealing for a pardon. The San Francisco Chronicle reported in 2003 that the Transportation Security Administration falsely placed Adams in a No Fly List along with other people with names like "J. Adams".

In December 2007, Columbia, South Carolina newspaper The State reported that Adams called on increased oversight of the South Carolina Supreme Court in response to a controversy over the court reversing the grades of 20 who failed the bar exam.

In August 2020, Trump appointed Adams to the U.S. Commission on Civil Rights.

=== Justice Department Civil Rights Division ===
The United States Department of Justice Civil Rights Division under the George W. Bush administration hired Adams in 2005. In 2008, Adams was one of three federal attorneys probing Lake Park, Florida for possible bias against African-Americans being elected to town commission.

In December 2009, Adams's supervisor and Civil Rights Division attorney Christopher Coates stepped down as chief of the voting division in December 2009 amid controversy over his objections to the dropping of the New Black Panther Party voter intimidation case. Coates' testimony before the United States Civil Rights Commission supported Adams' allegations, and the Commission's report that found "a cover-up of a possible racial double standard in law enforcement in the Civil Rights Division of the U.S. Department of Justice," and, detailing "a year of DOJ’s intransigence and baseless refusals to comply with our subpoenas," that "the Department of Justice is unquestionably hostile to any serious investigation of these allegations." In May 2010, Adams resigned from the Justice Department.

A later internal review by the Department of justice concluded that the dismissal of some charges in the Black Panthers intimidation case was "based on a good-faith assessment of the law and facts of the case" and found "no evidence that partisan politics was a motivating factor in reaching the decision."

=== Post-Justice Department career ===
After leaving the Justice Department, Adams became a contributor to Pajamas Media. He has been a guest commentator for Fox News, Rush Limbaugh's DailyRushbo.com, the Heritage Foundation, Newsmax TV and other conservative media. On June 28, 2010, The Washington Times published a guest commentary by Adams in which Adams accused the Justice Department of racial bias by dropping the New Black Panthers case. Subsequently, Adams accused Assistant Attorney General Thomas Perez of lying under oath in investigative hearings before the U.S. Commission on Civil Rights. On July 6, 2010, Adams testified before the Commission on Civil Rights that the Justice Department's decision was driven by racial bias against white Americans.

During the 2012 Republican presidential primaries in Virginia, Adams represented candidate Michele Bachmann in a multi-candidate lawsuit to add Bachmann and others to the primary ballot in Virginia. Bachmann and the other candidates lost the lawsuit.

==== Claims about voter fraud ====
Adams serves as president of the non-profit Public Interest Legal Foundation (PILF), a group that advocates for stricter voter ID laws, and has without evidence asserted that there is an "alien invasion" at the voting booth. According to NBC News, the foundation has "spent years suing counties to force them to purge their rolls and he's published personal information online about thousands of registered voters he believes could have committed fraud." Adams has described those who say there is no comprehensive proof of systemic voter fraud as "flat-earthers". In 2017, Adams was chosen by President Donald Trump to be a member of Trump's Presidential Advisory Commission on Election Integrity. Adams opposes automatic voter registration, saying that voter registration should require "forethought and initiative, something lacking in large segments of the Democrat base."

PILF has published the information of eligible voters online, including Social Security numbers, falsely accusing them of being fraudulent voters. One such voter was a U.S. missionary in Guatemala who was highlighted as a fraudulent voter in a Washington Times article based on the PILF report.

In 2021 Adams criticized the Electronic Registration Information Center on the radio and other outlets which had repercussions that led public opinion to shift with several state election officials later pulling out of the cooperative data sharing network and potentially diminishing voter roll accuracy. Adams is a critic of the National Voter Registration Act of 1993 due to citizenship self-reporting.

== Bibliography ==
- Adams, J. Christian (2011), Injustice: Exposing the Racial Agenda of the Obama Justice Department, Washington, D.C.: Regnery Publishing, ISBN 978-1-59698277-2

== See also ==
- Christopher Coates
- New Black Panther Party voter intimidation case
