= New Black Panther Party voter intimidation case =

2008 political controversy in the US

The New Black Panther Party voter intimidation case was a political controversy in the United States concerning an incident that occurred during the 2008 election. Two weeks before George W. Bush left office, the New Black Panther Party and two of its members, Minister King Samir Shabazz and Jerry Jackson, were sued by the Department of Justice on claims of voter intimidation for their conduct outside a polling station in Philadelphia, Pennsylvania.

The U.S. Department of Justice later narrowed the charges against Minister King Shabazz and dismissed the charges against Jackson, the New Black Panther Party and its leader. The dismissals led to accusations that the Obama administration's Department of Justice was biased against white victims and unwilling to prosecute minorities for civil rights violations. These charges were most notably made by J. Christian Adams, who in May 2010 resigned his post in the Department of Justice in protest over the Obama administration's alleged mishandling of the case, and by his former supervisor Christopher Coates.

Counter-accusations were made, including claims that the actual incident was relatively minor but had been blown out of proportion by individuals and groups with primarily political motives. Then-Attorney General Eric Holder denied claims that his Justice Department considered the race of alleged victims or perpetrators when deciding which cases to pursue. The case and its handling by the Department were investigated by the United States Commission on Civil Rights which released its report regarding the matter in December 2010. The Department of Justice's Office of Professional Responsibility released its report in March 2011. The Office of the Inspector General of the Department of Justice released its report in March 2013.

== Incident and initial response ==
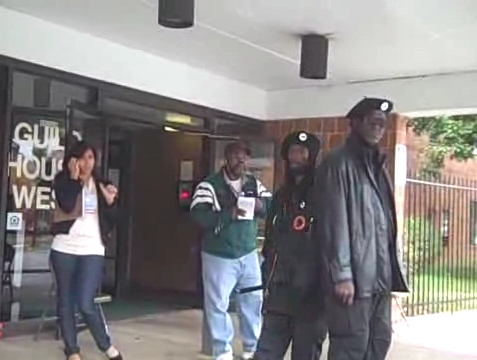
Minister King Samir Shabazz and Jerry Jackson, two members of the New Black Panther Party, standing outside a Philadelphia polling station on Election Day in November 2008.

The conduct for which members of the New Black Panther Party were accused of voter intimidation took place on Election Day in November 2008, at a polling station in a predominantly African-American, Democratic voting district of Philadelphia.

Two members of the New Black Panther Party, Minister King Samir Shabazz, and Jerry Jackson, stood in front of the entrance to the polling station in uniforms that have been described as military or paramilitary. Minister King Samir Shabazz carried a billy club, and is reported to have pointed it at voters while both men shouted racial slurs, including phrases such as "white devil" and "you're about to be ruled by the black man, cracker."

The incident drew the attention of police, who around 10:00 am, sent King Samir away in part because of his billy club. Jackson was allowed to stay, in part because he was a certified poll watcher . Stephen Robert Morse, a journalist and filmmaker, upon arriving at the scene, pulled out a Flip video camera and focused on Samir Shabazz. The incident gained national attention after being uploaded to YouTube and quickly going viral. No complaints were filed by voters about the incident, although poll watchers witnessed some voters approach the polls and then turn away, apparently in response to the New Black Panther Party members.

== Legal proceedings ==
The Department of Justice became aware of the Election Day incident and started an inquiry. In January 2009, less than two weeks before the Bush Administration left office, the Civil Rights Division of the Department of Justice filed a civil suit under the Voting Rights Act against four defendants, including Shabazz.

In April 2009 Bartle Bull, a former civil rights lawyer who was serving as a poll watcher at the polling station where the incident occurred, submitted an affidavit at the Department of Justice's request supporting the lawsuit, stating that he considered it to have been the most severe instance of voter intimidation he had ever encountered.

When none of the defendants who were charged appeared in court to answer the charges, the career attorneys pursuing the lawsuit assumed that they would win it by default. However the move to pursue a default judgment was overruled by two of their line superiors, Loretta King, who was acting Assistant Attorney General, and Steve Rosenbaum, Acting Deputy Assistant Attorney General. The federal government dropped charges against all defendants except Shabazz in May 2009. A spokesperson for the Department of Justice stated that the claims were "dismissed against the other defendants based on a careful assessment of the facts and the law." Questions about the validity of this explanation served as the basis for subsequent controversy over the case, which was investigated by the United States Commission on Civil Rights, Republican members of Congress, and the DOJ. The federal government eventually obtained an injunction forbidding Shabazz from displaying a weapon within 100 feet of a Philadelphia polling location.

=== Legal precedents ===
Since the Voting Rights Act was enacted in 1965, only a handful of cases under the Act have been pursued by the Justice Department. One such case filed by the Department during the Bush Administration, known as United States v. Brown, was one of the first voting rights cases which involved a white plaintiff and a black defendant. The case precipitated deep divisions within the Justice Department. Some employees felt that the voting rights act was passed because historically, it was minorities who had been disenfranchised and that the department should therefore focus on cases filed by minorities, while others felt that it was intended to protect all voters in a race-neutral manner. Employees who worked the Brown case have described being harassed by colleagues due to the widespread belief that civil rights laws should not be used to protect white voters. One Justice Department official stated that "The Voting Rights Act was passed because people like Bull Connor were hitting people like John Lewis, not the other way around."

=== Controversy over political involvement ===
In October 2010, a draft report from the Civil Rights Commission was posted on the political website TPM Muckraker, stating that political officials had been extensively involved in the decision to dismiss the case and that the Department of Justice had attempted to conceal their involvement. Civil Rights Commission chairman Gerald A. Reynolds confirmed the draft was authentic, but claimed it was not the most current version of the draft, and declined to immediately release the newest version or describe what revisions had been made to it. The Justice Department denied the allegations in the report.

== Reactions to dismissal ==
Questions about the validity of the explanation given by the Department of Justice for its actions in the case resulted in subsequent controversy. The case was investigated by the United States Commission on Civil Rights, Republican members of Congress, and the Department of Justice.

In response to this controversy, the New Black Panther Party suspended its Philadelphia chapter and repudiated Minister King Shabazz in a posting at its website. The party stated that Shabazz made "an honest error" by bringing a billy club to the polling station and that because of his doing so he had been suspended from the New Black Panther Party until January 2010.

=== Reactions in Congress ===
Some Republican members of Congress have been critical of the decision to narrow the scope of the case, including Representatives Frank Wolf of Virginia and Lamar Smith of Texas. Wolf was quoted by the Washington Times as asking, "If showing a weapon, making threatening statements and wearing paramilitary uniforms in front of polling station doors does not constitute voter intimidation, at what threshold of activity would these laws be enforceable?" Smith expressed skepticism at the Obama administration's stated justification for narrowing it, stating "The administration still has failed to explain why it did not pursue an obvious case of voter intimidation. Refusal to address these concerns only confirms politicization of the issue and does not reflect well on the Justice Department."

In July 2009, Smith requested a meeting with the head of the Justice Department's Voting Rights Section in order to discuss whether political appointees had been involved in the decision to narrow the case, stating that news reports contradicted the Justice Department's earlier claim that political appointees had not been involved, and that earlier congressional inquiries about this had been unsuccessful. Smith and Wolf also requested that the voter intimidation charges which had previously been dropped be refiled. In January 2010, after several unsuccessful attempts at obtaining the requested information from the department, Wolf sought a resolution of inquiry that would have forced the Justice Department to provide Congress with the details of why it narrowed the case. In a vote along party lines, the resolution was defeated 15-14.

In July 2010, seven Republican members of the Senate Judiciary Committee sent a letter to committee chairman Senator Patrick Leahy, calling for a hearing on potential "widespread politicization and possible corruption" in the Justice Department in regard to its decision to narrow the case. The letter quoted the testimony of J. Christian Adams (see below) that within the Civil Rights Division of the department there was "open hostility toward equal enforcement in a colorblind way", and requested a hearing to determine whether Adams' accusation was accurate.

=== Department of Justice Internal Investigations ===
On August 28, 2009, in response to the complaints raised by Representative Smith, the Department of Justice's internal Office of Professional Responsibility opened an inquiry into the department's handling of the case. Smith praised the decision, stating "I am pleased that someone at the Justice Department is finally taking the dismissal of the New Black Panther Party case seriously."

On September 13, 2010, the Department of Justice's inspector general Glenn A. Fine announced he was opening a second investigation, focusing not on the New Black Panther case specifically but on the more general question of whether the Justice Department enforces voting rights laws "in a non-discriminatory manner", as well as whether voting section employees have been harassed for investigating or prosecuting particular matters. Smith and Wolf also expressed approval of this decision.

=== Civil Rights Commission ===
The United States Civil Rights Commission is an eight-member panel. According to the New York Times, the commission is controlled by six-member conservative bloc that was appointed during the Bush administration. On June 16, 2009, the commission sent a letter to the civil rights division of the Department of Justice questioning their decision to drop the case, stating "Though it had basically won the case, the Civil Rights Division took the unusual move of voluntarily dismissing the charges. The division's public rationale would send the wrong message entirely — that attempts at voter suppression will be tolerated and will not be vigorously prosecuted so long as the groups or individuals who engage in them fail to respond to the charges leveled against them." The commission received a response to its letter on June 20 from Portia Roberson, the Department of Justice's director of the Office of Intergovernmental and Public Liaison. Her response stated that the case was dropped because "the facts and the law" did not support pursuing it. According to the commission, Ms. Roberson's letter did not respond to the commission's question whether there were any past cases in which the department's Civil Rights Division had dismissed charges against a defendant accused of voter intimidation, and what its evidentiary and legal standards were for dismissing such charges.

On August 7, 2009, The Civil Rights Commission sent a second letter to the Department of Justice, stating that the department had been "largely non-responsive" to its previous inquiry, accusing it of failing to cooperate with investigations into why it dropped some of the charges, and again requesting the detailed information which the commission had requested in its first letter. In early September 2009, after still not receiving what it considered a satisfactory response from the department, the commission voted to investigate "the merits of the NBPP enforcement actions (regardless of how the decisions were made) and the potential impact on future voter-intimidation enforcement by the department." In a third letter to the department, the Civil Rights Commission asked Attorney General Eric Holder to name a Justice Department official to provide the information necessary for its investigation.

In December 2009, the Civil Rights Commission subpoenaed J. Christian Adams and Christopher Coates, the lead attorneys who had been involved in prosecuting the New Black Panther Party, to testify on why some of the complaints had been dismissed. The Department of Justice (DOJ) directed Adams and Coates not to comply with the subpoena, stating that the authority to initiate criminal prosecution of anyone lies with the DOJ, not with the Civil Rights Commission.

Later that month, Assistant Attorney General Thomas E. Perez removed Coates from his post and transferred him to the U.S. attorney's office in South Carolina. Perez subsequently disallowed Coates from testifying before the Civil Rights Commission, stating this was because his post in South Carolina caused him to not be "the appropriate witness to testify regarding current [Civil Rights] Division policies." His dismissal led the Washington Times to accuse Perez of transferring Coates specifically in order to remove him from the commission's subpoena jurisdiction. In October 2010, Michael Yaki, one of the two Democratic commissioners, walked out of a meeting in protest. In doing so, Yaki deprived the panel of a quorum and delayed a vote on a draft report, which Yaki claimed, was unfairly biased against the Obama administration. Yaki described the panel as a "kangaroo court".

In December 2010, the Civil Rights Commission released a report concluding that their investigations had uncovered "numerous specific examples of open hostility and opposition" within the Department of Justice to pursuing cases in which whites were the victims. The report accused the Department of Justice of failing to cooperate with investigations into its reason for dropping the case, stating "While the department has issued general statements that it enforces the laws without regard to race, these assurances do not confirm, deny or explain the specific allegations of misconduct […] Unfortunately, the department has thus far refused to address many of these specific claims or to provide the type of information that would allow the commission to properly review the decision making relating to the NBPP lawsuit."

=== J. Christian Adams ===
On May 14, 2010, Adams resigned from his post as a trial attorney for the voting section of the Department of Justice. In his resignation letter and a subsequent article written by him for the Washington Times, Adams stated that the reason for his resignation was his disapproval of the department's handling of the Black Panther case, and more specifically their demand that he not comply with the subpoena from the Civil Rights Commission.

In testimony before the Civil Rights Commission, Adams stated: "I was told by voting section management that cases are not going to be brought against black defendants on [behalf] of white victims." Adams accused the lawyers who ordered the narrowing of the case of having not read the documents describing the facts and applicable law before making this decision and claimed that his superiors had instructed him and others in the voting section to no longer bring any cases against minority offenders. Adams said, responding to the claim that the New Black Panthers' actions in Philadelphia were an "isolated incident":

To the contrary, the Black Panthers in October 2008 announced a nationwide deployment for the election. We had indications that polling-place thugs were deployed elsewhere, not only in November 2008 but during the Democratic primaries, where they targeted white Hillary Rodham Clinton supporters."

Responding to Adams' testimony, Assistant Attorney General Thomas E. Perez stated there was insufficient evidence to support the case; Justice Department spokeswoman Tracy Schmaler stated that "The department makes enforcement decisions based on the merits, not the race, gender or ethnicity of any party involved."

Critics of Adams' testimony have questioned Adams' impartiality as he was hired during the Bush administration. He has subsequent to his employment at the DOJ worked as a conservative activist, and argued forcefully for voter ID legislation and has without evidence alleged that there is an "alien invasion" at the voting booth. Adams has pointed out that several independent reviewers of his performance in the Department of Justice had concluded that he was a "model attorney" who enforced voting laws in a race-neutral fashion and that the reviewers reaching this conclusion included Loretta King, who supervised the dismissal of the Black Panther case.

=== Abigail Thernstrom ===
Abigail Thernstrom, the former vice-chair of the U.S. Commission on Civil Rights, has been a vocal critic of the investigations over the Black Panther case. In an interview with CBS News, Thernstrom said that she believes "the evidence is extremely weak" that the Department of Justice has discriminated against white voters. Thernstrom explained her opinion on the case in an article for National Review, in which she refers to the New Black Panther Party case as "very small potatoes". She stated, "There are plenty of grounds on which to sharply criticize the attorney general — his handling of terrorism questions, just for starters — but this particular overblown attack threatens to undermine the credibility of his conservative critics."

Thernstrom's stance has been sharply criticized by other conservatives, such as federal prosecutor Andrew C. McCarthy, who wrote a response to Thernstrom in a later issue of National Review. He points out that a year earlier Thernstrom had been among those criticizing the Obama administration's decision to dismiss the case, and that she had not explained the reason for her reversal of opinion. McCarthy referred to the comment by Bartle Bull, who witnessed the incident, that it was the most blatant form of voter intimidation he had ever encountered in his life, as well as the fact that it was highly unusual for the case to be dismissed after a default judgment against the defendants had already been won. In reply to McCarthy, Thernstrom clarified her opinion by stating that "I still have questions about DOJ's conduct, and I remain interested in knowing more about why the department declined to pursue the case." However, she added that as she learned more about the case, she became doubtful it was as severe an example of voter intimidation as it first appeared to be, and was of the opinion that "the incident was not of sufficient importance to be the primary focus of our yearlong project."

=== Christopher Coates ===
In his testimony before the Civil Rights Commission, Adams stated that his accusations could be corroborated by Christopher Coates, the former head of the voting section of the Department of Justice's Civil Rights Division who had led the original investigation of the New Black Panther Party. The Department refused to allow Coates to testify. In September 2010, Coates was granted whistleblower protection and testified before the Civil Rights Commission in defiance of his supervisors' instructions.

Coates' testimony included accusations similar to those made by Adams, stating, "I had people who told me point-blank that [they] didn't come to the voting rights section to sue African American people." He compared the New Black Panther case to an earlier case from 2006, in which Department of Justice attorneys expressed anger at having to investigate Ike Brown, a black Democratic politician in Noxubee County, Mississippi accused of discriminating against white voters. Coates testified that the Justice Department's administration's decision to drop the Black Panther Case "was intended to send a direct message to people inside and outside the civil rights division. That message is that the filing of voting cases like the Ike Brown and the NBPP cases would not continue in the Obama administration." Coates testified that one of his superiors appointed by the Obama Administration had prohibited him from asking job applicants if they would enforce the voting laws in a race-neutral manner. Attorney General Holder denied these claims, stating "The notion that we are enforcing any Civil Rights laws, voting or other, on the basis of race, ethnicity, or gender is simply false."

Some civil rights officials in the Obama Administration expressed the view that Voting Rights Act was specifically intended to correct historic injustices against minorities. The Philadelphia Inquirer and the Washington Post pointed out that although the Department of Justice dismissed Adams' testimony as that of a partisan hired during the Bush Administration, Coates is of a different pedigree and cannot be ignored as easily. Coates worked for the American Civil Liberties Union for nearly 20 years, receiving the Thurgood Marshall Decade Award from the Georgia NAACP in 1991, and was hired by the Justice Department during the Clinton Administration in 1996.

== Media coverage ==
The Black Panther case had been receiving more coverage from conservative media outlets than from other ones. A Newsweek op-ed implied that this is because the case was not newsworthy and that the conservative media is attempting to stage "an effective piece of political theater that hurts the Obama administration".

Mark Potok of the Southern Poverty Law Center, which lists the NBPP as a hate group, described the conservative media's handling of the case as amounting to a "tempest in a teacup". Republican Linda Chavez described the video as damning but relatively minor. She stated that because the story has pictures, it was the kind of story that you can run over and over again.

The Washington Times, which covered the case in detail, accused the media of failing to cover the story because liberal sources are reluctant to criticize the Obama Administration. According to a July 2010 article by the Washington Post Ombudsman, the Post received numerous complaints from readers about their lack of coverage of the story, and agreed that the case deserved more coverage than it received and would be given more in the future. The Post stated that the delay in coverage was "a result of limited staffing and a heavy volume of other news on the Justice Department beat."

New Black Panther Party chairman Malik Zulu Shabazz accused Fox News of contributing to racial tensions as part of "a right-wing Republican conspiracy", and other members of the New Black Panther Party made similar accusations, referring to the station as "Fox Jews".
