= Lauren Weinstein (technologist) =

Lauren Weinstein (/ˈwaɪnstaɪn/) is an American activist concerned with matters involving technology.

He has been quoted as an expert on Internet and other technology issues by various media.

He became involved with those issues in the early 1970s at the first site on the ARPANET, which was located at UCLA. He was the co-founder of People For Internet Responsibility (PFIR) and the co-founder of URIICA — the Union for Representative International Internet Cooperation and Analysis

Weinstein has been a columnist for Wired News and a commentator on NPR's (National Public Radio) "Morning Edition". He is also a frequent contributor to the "Inside Risks" column of the Communications of the ACM and an active blogger.
