= Natasha C. Merle =

American judge (born 1983)

Natasha Merle
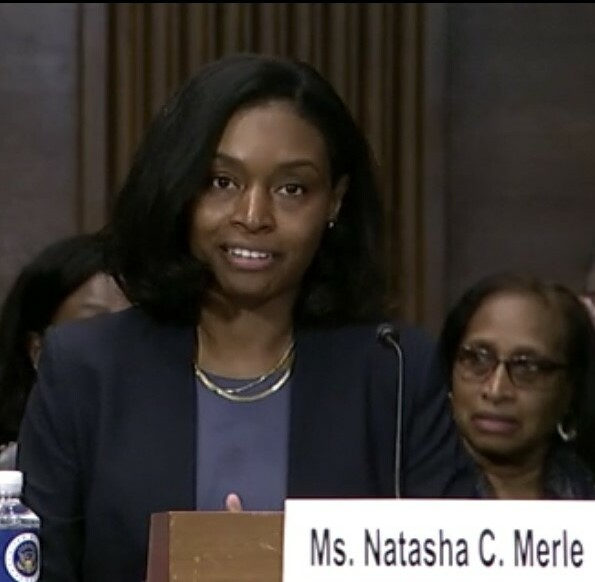

Judge of the United States District Court for the Eastern District of New York
- Incumbent
- Assumed office August 11, 2023
- Appointed by: Joe Biden
- Preceded by: Seat established

Personal details
- Born: Natasha Clarise Merle; 1983 (age 42–43) Brunswick, Maine, U.S.
- Party: Democratic
- Education: University of Texas, Austin (BA); New York University (JD)

Natasha Clarise Merle (born 1983) is an American lawyer from New York who serves as a United States district judge of the United States District Court for the Eastern District of New York.

== Education ==
Merle received her Bachelor of Arts in government and Spanish, with honors, from the University of Texas at Austin in 2005 and she graduated, cum laude, with a Juris Doctor from the New York University School of Law in 2008.

== Career ==
Merle began her legal career as a law clerk for Judge Robert L. Carter of the United States District Court for the Southern District of New York from 2008 to 2009. From 2009 to 2011, she was a staff attorney at the Gulf Region Advocacy Center. Merle then became an assistant federal public defender at the Office of the Federal Public Defender. She also served as a law clerk for Judge John Gleeson of the United States District Court for the Eastern District of New York from 2012 to 2013.

From 2013 to 2015, Merle was a litigation associate and civil rights fellow at Fried, Frank, Harris, Shriver & Jacobson in New York City.

From 2016 to 2021, she served as assistant counsel and then senior counsel for the NAACP Legal Defense and Educational Fund ("LDF"). From 2021 to 2023, she was the deputy director of litigation at LDF.

From 2019 to 2021, Merle was a adjunct professor of clinical law at the New York University School of Law and from 2020 to 2021, she was a lecturer in law at Columbia Law School.

=== Notable cases ===
In 2017, Merle was a member of the petitioner team in Buck v. Davis.

In 2017, Merle was lead counsel for NAACP LDF v. Trump.

=== Federal judicial service ===
On January 19, 2022, President Joe Biden nominated Merle to serve as a United States district judge of the United States District Court for the Eastern District of New York. President Biden nominated Merle to a new seat created following the appointment of Roslynn R. Mauskopf as director of the Administrative Office of the United States Courts. On April 27, 2022, a hearing on her nomination was held before the Senate Judiciary Committee. During Merle's confirmation hearing, Republican senators criticized her over comments she made in 2017 in which she said that proposals for voter ID laws and a border wall were based in white supremacy. On May 26, 2022, her nomination was reported out of committee by a 12–10 vote. On January 3, 2023, her nomination was returned to the President under Rule XXXI, Paragraph 6 of the United States Senate; she was renominated later the same day. On February 2, 2023, the committee failed to report her nomination by a 10–10 vote. On February 9, 2023, her nomination was reported out of committee by an 11–10 vote. On June 21, 2023, the Senate invoked cloture on her nomination by a 51–50 vote, with Vice President Kamala Harris voting in the affirmative. Later that day, her nomination was confirmed by a 50–49 vote. Senator Joe Manchin joined all the Senate Republicans in opposing her nomination. Merle was President Biden's 100th district court judge to be confirmed. She received her judicial commission on August 11, 2023.

== See also ==
- List of African-American federal judges
- List of African-American jurists
- Joe Biden judicial appointment controversies

Legal offices
New seat	Judge of the United States District Court for the Eastern District of New York; 2023–present	Incumbent
