= Christopher Coates =

United States lawyer and government official

Christopher Coates (1945-2025) was a U.S. Justice Department official and former ACLU lawyer. He stepped down as chief of the Justice Civil Rights Division Voting Section in December 2009 and transferred to the U.S. Attorney's office in South Carolina. He was involved in the New Black Panther Party voter intimidation case that was later dropped, and was not permitted by the department to testify before U.S. Civil Rights Commission Hearing investigating issues related to the case.

J. Christian Adams has said that Coates, who he worked with on a voter intimidation case involving the New Black Panther Party, was transferred after a confrontation with acting head of the Civil Rights Division, Steve Rosenbaum.

On September 24, 2010, Coates defied the DOJ and testified before the U.S. Commission on Civil Rights.

Coates died in March 2025.

== See also ==
- J. Christian Adams
- New Black Panther Party voter intimidation case
