= Public Interest Legal Foundation =

American conservative foundation established in 2012

- Abbreviation: PILF
- Formation: 2012; 14 years ago
- Type: 501(c)(3) organization
- Tax ID no.: 45-4355641
- Headquarters: 107 S. West Street, Suite 700, Alexandria, Virginia, 22314
- Location: Alexandria, Virginia, U.S.
- Coordinates: 38.8056501°N 77.0551454°W
- President: J. Christian Adams
- Affiliations: 501(c)(3)
- Revenue: $2.2 million (2017)
- Website: publicinterestlegal.org

The Public Interest Legal Foundation (PILF) is an American conservative legal group based in Alexandria, Virginia, which is known for suing states and local governments to purge voters from election rolls. The nonprofit was constituted in 2012.

PILF asserts that "large numbers of ineligible aliens are registering to vote and casting ballots", although lists that they have displayed of such supposed voters prove to actually include American natives who are eligible voters. PILF said its lists had been based on state government lists of declared "non-citizens" removed from local voter rolls, but some U.S. citizens were wrongfully purged in the process. The group has made false claims about the extent of voter fraud in the United States, and the organization has published the information of eligible voters online, including Social Security numbers, falsely accusing them of being fraudulent voters.

== Activities ==
The Public Interest Legal Foundation was established in 2012. The organization is a 501(c)(3) non-profit American corporation currently based in Alexandria, Virginia.

The group has been involved in legal cases in Texas, North Carolina, North Dakota, Florida, Pennsylvania, Indiana, Nevada, Virginia, Kansas, D.C., and Mississippi. The organization has filed documents in favor of a Florida law barring ex-convicts who owe fines from voting. PILF has also participated as a primary party or intervenor in the U.S. Third Circuit Court of Appeals, Eleventh Circuit Court of Appeals, and the Court of Appeals for the Federal Circuit. The organization also submits amicus curiae briefs to the U.S. Supreme Court on election-related issues.

PILF has sent mailings to hundreds of counties claiming that their voting rolls are provably corrupt; PolitiFact has judged these claims to be "false", stating that "inactive" registrants should not be counted with "active" ones when calculating total rates of voter registration. The foundation originally flagged jurisdictions with more registered voters than resident adults, according to annual U.S. Census population estimates at the time. ProPublica found major counting errors in PlLF's use of government data; PlLF subsequently corrected its analysis.

In 2016 and 2017, the organization published the information of eligible voters online, including Social Security numbers, falsely accusing them of being fraudulent voters. One such voter was a U.S. missionary in Guatemala who, based on PILF's report, was inaccurately highlighted as a fraudulent voter in a Washington Times article. In 2018, the Richmond Council for the League of United Latin American Citizens and four individual voters filed a federal lawsuit, LULAC of Richmond v. Public Interest Legal Foundation, in the Eastern District of Virginia against the PILF for these false reports. The lawsuit claimed violations of the Ku Klux Klan Act and the Voting Rights Act, as well as state defamation laws. PILF settled the lawsuit by removing the personal information from its website and adding a statement to its reports saying "PILF recognizes that individuals in [the removed exhibits] were in fact citizens and that these citizens did not commit felonies. PILF profoundly regrets any characterization of those registrants as felons or instances of registration or voting as felonies."

On January 5, 2024, the organization along with the American Center for Law & Justice and several states filed as an amici curiae in the U.S. Supreme court case Colorado Republican State Central Committee v Norma Anderson et al..

== Organization ==
The organization's current president and general counsel is J. Christian Adams, an American attorney and conservative activist formerly employed by the United States Department of Justice under the George W. Bush administration. Adams has described those who say there is no comprehensive proof of systemic voter fraud as "flat-earthers", and opposes automatic voter registration, saying that voter registration should require "forethought and initiative, something lacking in large segments of the Democrat base". In 2017 Adams was chosen by President Donald Trump to be a member of his Presidential Advisory Commission on Election Integrity.

Director Hans von Spakovsky is an American attorney and a former member of the Federal Election Commission (FEC). He is the manager of The Heritage Foundation's Election Law Reform Initiative and a senior legal fellow in Heritage's Meese Center for Legal and Judicial Studies. He is an advocate for more restrictive voting laws. He has been described as playing an influential role in making alarmism about voter fraud mainstream in the Republican Party, despite no evidence of widespread voter fraud. His work claiming voting fraud is rampant has been discredited. In 2017 President Donald J. Trump named him to be a member of the Presidential Advisory Commission on Election Integrity.

== Lawsuits ==
In 2018 PILF sued Harris County, Texas, alleging violations of the National Voter Registration Act of 1993. The complaint claimed the county Voter Registrar's office refused access to records of registered voters identified as noncitizens and what actions the office had taken in regard to these registrations. The lawsuit was settled in March 2020. The county agreed to provide records of people taken off the voter roll due to ineligibility and names of those who received notice their eligibility was questioned by election officials (social security numbers and phone numbers excluded). It also included copies of voter registration applications with blank or negative responses to questions about citizenship. In seven years, the county reported 998 voter registrations challenged or disallowed based on citizenship, and ten percent of the challenged voters successfully countered the challenge. Harris County, which includes Houston, has more than 2.5 million registered voters.

In December 2019, PILF filed a lawsuit against the City of Detroit, claiming that the city failed to maintain voter registration records as required by federal and state laws. The suit was dropped in July 2020 after actions by Detroit Clerk Janice Winfrey and Elections Director George Azzouz to review and remove likely deceased registrants on a list provided by the plaintiff. "...after the League of Women Voters of Michigan and the League of Women Voters of Detroit intervened and pressed PILF to produce evidence to support its claims, PILF dropped its lawsuit."

In February 2020, PILF sued Maine Secretary of State Matt Dunlap for alleged violation of the Public Disclosure Provision of the Voting Rights Act of 1965. The complaint claims Dunlap's office illegally denied the group access to the state's list of registered voters, preventing full public access and monitoring of the rolls as provided by Public Disclosure Provision of the act. State law enumerates those who the list is to be made available to, including to organizations specifically involved in "get out the vote" efforts. The suit states that they were denied the list due to not being involved in such efforts.

Also in February 2020, PILF sued Allegheny County, Pennsylvania, alleging violations of the National Voter Registration Act of 1993 for not making a "reasonable effort" to remove the names of ineligible voters from its voter registration rolls. In December 2019, Pennsylvania Auditor General Eugene DePasquale found in an audit of the county's voter rolls that about 42,000 active records should have been placed into inactive status because of five years of inactivity. The American Civil Liberties Union asked the court to allow four groups to intervene. "The ACLU's attorneys argue that the foundation's lawsuit does not account for thousands of names that were removed as part of a routine cleanup of the rolls in January." The lawsuit was settled three months later with an agreement to allow voter registration roll maintenance leads and feedback.

In August 2020, PILF filed a lawsuit against Michigan Secretary of State Jocelyn Benson for failing to act on a request to disclose voting records related to the 2018 general election from the city of Southfield. The foundation sought records of 193 allegedly altered voter history files from November 2018 that led to six felony charges against Southfield City Clerk Sherikia Hawkins in the altering of ballot records.

PILF was party to an Arizona lawsuit that became known as "Sharpiegate". The lawsuit alleged voters in were forced to use felt tip markers to mark their ballots, which resulted in bleed through and their ballots being set aside. The lawsuit was dropped immediately after the election, after Arizona Attorney General Mark Brnovich indicated an investigation found there was nothing to the claims."

In February 2024, a federal judge in North Dakota dismissed a lawsuit backed by the Public Interest Legal Foundation that challenged the state's acceptance of mail-in ballots after Election Day. State law allows the ballots to be counted by a canvassing board meeting 13 days after the election, so long as they are postmarked by election day. The lawsuit was brought by County Auditor Mark Splonskowski without authorization from his county board, representing a county that includes Bismarck, the state capitol. The court ruled Splonskowski lacked standing, failed to show he was harmed by the law or that constitutional rights were being violated and that if successful the lawsuit would impact overseas and military voters. The ruling read in part "This is deeply concerning to the Court that an elected official openly advocates for violating the law he was elected to enforce because he has independently concluded it contradicts federal law."

== Board of directors ==
- J. Christian Adams, president
- Ken Blackwell, treasurer
- William E. Davis, director
- David A. Norcross, director
- Brad Schlozman, director
- Hans von Spakovsky, board chairman
- Clara Belle Wheeler, director
