= Anita Josey-Herring =

American judge (born 1960)

Senior Judge of the Superior Court of the District of Columbia
- Incumbent
- Assumed office October 1, 2024

Chief Judge of the Superior Court of the District of Columbia
- In office October 16, 2020 – September 30, 2024
- Preceded by: Robert E. Morin
- Succeeded by: Milton C. Lee

Associate Judge of the Superior Court of the District of Columbia
- In office November 11, 1997 – October 1, 2024
- President: Bill Clinton
- Preceded by: Colleen Kollar-Kotelly
- Succeeded by: vacant

Personal details
- Born: Anita Marie Josey; September 19, 1960 (age 64); Portsmouth, Virginia, U.S.
- Education: Virginia Commonwealth University (BA); Georgetown University (JD)

Anita Marie Josey-Herring (born September 19, 1960) is a senior judge of the Superior Court of the District of Columbia.

== Education and career ==
Josey-Herring received her Bachelor of Arts from Virginia Commonwealth University in 1982 and her Juris Doctor from Georgetown University Law Center in 1987.

After graduating, she served as a law clerk for Judge Herbert B. Dixon Jr. on the D.C. Superior Court.

=== D.C. Superior Court ===
On September 2, 1997, President Bill Clinton nominated Josey-Herring to a fifteen-year term as an associate judge on the Superior Court of the District of Columbia to the seat vacated by Colleen Kollar-Kotelly. On October 30, 1997, the Senate Committee on Governmental Affairs held a hearing on her nomination. On November 5, 1997, the Committee reported her nomination favorably to the senate floor. On November 7, 1997, the full Senate confirmed her nomination by voice vote.

On September 11, 2012, the Commission on Judicial Disabilities and Tenure recommended that President Obama reappoint her to second fifteen-year term as a judge on the D.C. Superior Court.

On July 21, 2020, the Nominating Commission selected Josey-Herring to be the next Chief Judge of the Superior Court. She was sworn in on October 16, 2020. Upon the end of her term as chief judge, she took senior status effective October 1, 2024.
