= People for Internet Responsibility =

The People For Internet Responsibility (PFIR) is a global, ad hoc network of individuals concerned about the operations, development, management, and regulation of the Internet in responsible ways, co-founded by Lauren Weinstein and Peter G. Neumann in November, 1999 in California. PFIR is attempting to become a nonprofit 501 (c)(3) corporation, and claims to be nonpartisan, does not partake in lobbying, and has no political agenda. The main goal of PFIR is to be a resource for people around the world to impact critical issues on the Internet that have a significant impact on today's societies worldwide.

== What does PFIR do ==
Regarding Internet issues, PFIR is a resource for analysis, discussion, education, and data that is targeted to aid people from all around the world with successfully participating in the process of internet evolution, use, and control. PFIR uses their website, telephone, email services, workshops, television and radio broadcasts, and other venues in order to provide their resources on a worldwide level.

PFIR believes that there is increasing concern with the extremely rapid commercialization of the World Wide Web, that powerful commercial and political interests that do not necessarily share the concerns of the people at large are irresponsibly skewing decisions in regard to Internet resources. Such areas of concern to PFIR include spam security, freedom of speech, domain name policy, filtering, and other topics.
