= Milton C. Lee =

American judge (born 1960)

Milton C. Lee Jr.
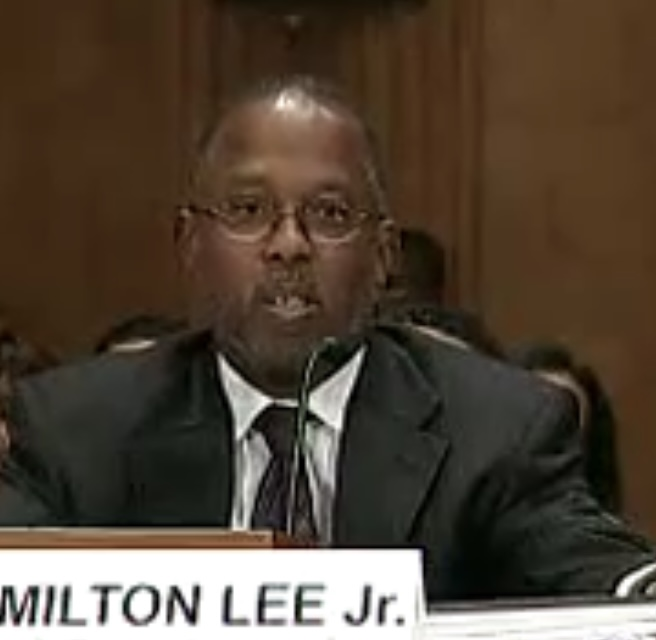

Chief Judge of the Superior Court of the District of Columbia
- Incumbent
- Assumed office October 1, 2024
- Preceded by: Anita Josey-Herring

Associate Judge of the Superior Court of the District of Columbia
- Incumbent
- Assumed office 2010
- President: Barack Obama
- Preceded by: Jerry Stewart Byrd

Magistrate Judge of the Superior Court of the District of Columbia
- In office November 1998 – 2010

Personal details
- Born: January 14, 1960 (age 66) Washington, D.C., U.S.
- Education: American University (BA); Catholic University of America (JD)

Milton C. Lee Jr. (born January 14, 1960) is an American judge. He is the chief judge of the Superior Court of the District of Columbia.

== Education and career ==
Lee earned his Bachelor of Arts from American University in 1982 and his Juris Doctor from Catholic University’s Columbus School of Law.

After graduating, he served as a staff attorney at the Public Defender Service for the District of Columbia. In 1993, Lee joined the faculty at David A. Clarke School of Law.

=== D.C. Superior Court ===
In November 1998, Lee was appointed as a magistrate judge on the Superior Court of the District of Columbia.

President Barack Obama nominated Lee on January 20, 2010, to a 15-year term as an associate judge of the Superior Court of the District of Columbia to the seat vacated by Jerry Stewart Byrd. On April 20, 2010, the Senate Committee on Homeland Security and Governmental Affairs held a hearing on his nomination. On April 28, 2010, the Committee reported his nomination favorably to the senate floor. On June 22, 2010, the full Senate confirmed his nomination by voice vote. On July 26, 2024, he was named by the District of Columbia Judicial Nomination Commission to become the chief judge of the D.C. Superior Court, effective on October 1, 2024.
