= Colleen Kollar-Kotelly =

American judge (born 1943)

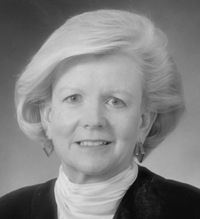

Senior Judge of the United States District Court for the District of Columbia
- Incumbent
- Assumed office February 21, 2023

Presiding Judge of the United States Foreign Intelligence Surveillance Court
- In office May 19, 2002 – May 18, 2009
- Appointed by: William Rehnquist
- Preceded by: Royce C. Lamberth
- Succeeded by: John D. Bates

Judge of the United States District Court for the District of Columbia
- In office March 26, 1997 – February 21, 2023
- Appointed by: Bill Clinton
- Preceded by: Harold H. Greene
- Succeeded by: Ana C. Reyes

Judge of the Superior Court of the District of Columbia
- In office 1984–1997
- Appointed by: Ronald Reagan
- Succeeded by: Anita Josey-Herring

Personal details
- Born: Colleen Constance Kollar; April 17, 1943 (age 83) New York City, New York, U.S.
- Spouse: John Theodore Kotelly
- Education: Catholic University of America (BA, JD)

Colleen Constance Kollar-Kotelly (born April 17, 1943) is an American lawyer serving as a senior United States district judge of the United States District Court for the District of Columbia and was previously presiding judge of the Foreign Intelligence Surveillance Court.

== Education and career ==
Colleen Constance Kollar was born in New York City, the daughter of Irene (née Crowley) and Konstantine Kollar, an environmental engineer. Her paternal grandparents, Paul and Anna Kollár, were emigrants from Hungary.

Konstantine Kollar worked at the U.S. Department of Commerce, where he was responsible for the planning of water resources, and he also served as a consultant to the World Health Organization and the Pan American Health Organization. From 1948 to 1959, he worked in U.S. foreign assistance programs in Mexico, Ecuador and Venezuela, where Kollar-Kotelly attended bilingual schools. She attended Georgetown Visitation Preparatory School in Washington, D.C. She earned her Bachelor of Arts degree in English from Catholic University of America (Delta Epsilon Honor Society) and her Juris Doctor from Catholic University of America's Columbus School of Law (Moot court Board of Governors) in 1968.

From 1968 to 1969, she served as a law clerk to Judge Catherine B. Kelly of the District of Columbia Court of Appeals. From 1969 to 1972, Kollar-Kotelly was an attorney for the Department of Justice, Criminal Division, Appellate Section, after which she became chief legal counsel for St. Elizabeths Hospital, Department of Health and Human Services, from 1972 to 1984.

On October 3, 1984, Kollar-Kotelly was nominated as an Associate Judge of the Superior Court of the District of Columbia by President Ronald Reagan; she took her oath of office on October 21. She served as Deputy Presiding Judge of the Criminal Division from 1995 to 1997.

=== Federal judicial service ===
Kollar-Kotelly was nominated by President Bill Clinton on January 7, 1997, to a seat on the United States District Court for the District of Columbia vacated by Judge Harold H. Greene. She was confirmed by the United States Senate on March 20, 1997, and received commission on March 26, 1997. She took her oath of office on May 12, 1997. Chief Justice William Rehnquist appointed Judge Kollar-Kotelly to serve on the Financial Disclosure Committee (2000–2002), and later as Presiding Judge of the United States Foreign Intelligence Surveillance Court, where she served from 2002 to 2009. She assumed senior status on February 21, 2023.

Kollar-Kotelly received attention from a 2006 article in The Washington Post describing her administration of the FISC, and in particular, what weight evidence taken from warrantless searches should be given to issuing subsequent search warrants for suspects of terrorism and espionage.

=== Notable cases ===
In August 2001, Kollar-Kotelly was assigned the United States v. Microsoft anti-trust case, after Judge Thomas Penfield Jackson was removed from the case.

On July 14, 2004, barely two months after President George W. Bush was forced to end National Security Agency domestic internet metadata collection by Attorney General John Ashcroft, Kollar-Kotelly issued a Foreign Intelligence Surveillance Act (FISA) court order allowing the NSA to resume domestic internet metadata collection.

Kollar-Kotelly denied a last-minute appeal by Saddam Hussein's legal team, stating that the United States has no right to interfere with the judicial processes of another nation's courts. In August 2007, she ordered the Bush administration to give its views regarding records requests by the American Civil Liberties Union on the National Security Agency's wiretapping program.

On October 1, 2007, Kollar-Kotelly reversed Bush's policy on archive secrecy in a 38-page ruling, which said that the U.S. Archivist's reliance on the executive order to delay release of the papers of former presidents is "arbitrary, capricious, an abuse of discretion and not in accordance with law." The National Security Archive at George Washington University alleged that the Bush order severely slowed or prevented the release of historic presidential papers.

On June 16, 2008, she ruled that the Office of Administration was not subject to the Freedom of Information Act, and therefore did not have to release records regarding missing White House e-mails.

On September 20, 2008, Kollar-Kotelly issued a preliminary injunction ordering Vice President of the United States Dick Cheney and the National Archives to preserve all of Cheney's official records.

On March 19, 2009, in response to a joint lawsuit brought by the Brady Campaign to Prevent Gun Violence, the National Parks Conservation Association and the Coalition of National Park Service Retirees, Kollar-Kotelly issued a preliminary injunction whereby she blocked a rule that would permit visitors to national parks to carry concealed weapons. The change of rule which she blocked had been enacted by the United States Department of the Interior after being supported by 51 members of Congress and passing an extended public comments period. She stated that her decision to block the change of rule was because there was no environmental analysis performed and therefore the Interior Department "ignored (without sufficient explanation) substantial information in the administrative record concerning environmental impacts" of the rule.

Kollar-Kotelly presided over the Espionage Act case against Dr. Stephen Jin-Woo Kim after he told a reporter that North Korea would test its nuclear program. The case was controversial because it was one of a string of unprecedented uses of the Espionage Act against officials for speaking with journalists.

On March 7, 2016, she denied a requested preliminary injunction against Washington, D.C.'s discretionary issue of concealed carry permits, thereby allowing DC police chief Cathy Lanier to continue denying concealed carry permits to law-abiding citizens in most cases. In 2017, Kollar-Kotelly presided over ACLU v. Trump and Pence.

On October 30, 2017, Kollar-Kotelly blocked the enforcement of President Donald Trump's ban on transgender individuals from serving in the military.

On May 14, 2024, Kollar-Kotelly sentenced Lauren Handy to 57 months in prison and three years of supervised release for her part in blocking access to an abortion clinic, a violation of the FACE Act.

On May 31, Judge Colleen Kollar-Kotelly sentenced 75-year-old Paulette "Paula" Harlow to two years in federal prison and 36 months of supervised release for violating the Freedom of Access to Clinic Entrances Act (FACE Act) during a pro-life demonstration at an abortion clinic in 2020. During sentencing, Kollar-Kotelly addressed concerns raised by Harlow’s husband, John, and her attorney, who pleaded for leniency due to her rapidly declining health, warning that imprisonment could endanger her life. In response, the judge referenced Harlow’s religious beliefs, stating:

"I would suggest that, in terms of your religion, one of the tenets is that you should make the effort, during this period of time—when it may be difficult for your husband—to do what is necessary to survive, because that's part of the tenets of your religion."

In October 2024, Kollar-Kotelly found Dominic Box, who participated in the January 6 United States Capitol attack, guilty on six charges. Before Box's scheduled sentencing date, he was pardoned by Donald Trump. Kollar-Kotelly criticized Trump's blanket pardons for those involved in the January 6 Capitol attack.

On February 6, 2025, Kollar-Kotelly issued a temporary ruling limiting the Department of Government Efficiency's access to the Treasury Department's payment system, which plaintiffs allege would allow the Department to access the personal information of millions of Americans. She arranged a hearing for February 24, 2025 to consider a preliminary injunction.

In a 120-page ruling on April 24, 2025, Kollar-Kotelly blocked part of Trump's executive order that would require people to prove U.S. citizenship before registering to vote. She wrote that the states and Congress, not the president, have the power to regulate elections.

In a June 2026 ruling, Kollar-Kotelly struck down the Internal Revenue Service's guidance that would have restricted wind and solar projects' eligibility for federal clean energy tax credits by tightening the standard for when construction begins. Kollar-Kotelly held that the IRS had failed to adequately justify its departure from longstanding policy and account for developers’ reliance interests.

== Sources ==
Legal offices
Preceded by Harold H. Greene	Judge of the United States District Court for the District of Columbia; 1997–2023	Succeeded by Ana C. Reyes
Preceded by Royce C. Lamberth	Presiding Judge of the United States Foreign Intelligence Surveillance Court; 2002–2009	Succeeded by John D. Bates
