= Federal Advisory Committee Act =

1972 American legislation

- Long title: An Act to authorize the establishment of a system governing the creation and operation of advisory committees in the executive branch of the Federal Government, and for other purposes.
- Acronyms (colloquial): FACA
- Enacted by: the 92nd United States Congress

Citations
- Public law: Pub. L. 92–463
- Statutes at Large: 86 Stat. 770

Legislative history
- Introduced in the House as H.R. 4383 on February 17, 1971; Committee consideration by House - Government Operations; Passed the House on May 9, 1972; Passed the Senate on September 12, 1972; Signed into law by President Richard Nixon on October 6, 1972

The Federal Advisory Committee Act (FACA) (Pub. L. 92–463, 86 Stat. 770, enacted October 6, 1972), is a United States federal law which governs the behavior of federal advisory committees. In particular, it has special emphasis on open meetings, chartering, public involvement, and reporting.

The Committee Management Secretariat of the U.S. General Services Administration (GSA) oversees the government-wide FACA program.

== Overview ==
=== Advisory committees ===
The Federal Advisory Committee Act defines advisory committee as "any committee, board, commission, council, conference, panel, task force, or other similar group" that dispenses "advice or recommendations" to the President of the United States, and excludes bodies that also exercise operational functions. They are provisional bodies and have the advantage of being able to circumvent bureaucracy and collect a range of opinions.

Committees composed of full-time officers or employees of the federal government do not count as advisory committees under FACA. Furthermore, the following organizations are also not governed by FACA: the Advisory Commission on Intergovernmental Relations, the Commission on Government Procurement, the National Academy of Sciences, the Central Intelligence Agency, the Federal Reserve, and the National Academy of Public Administration.

=== Purpose ===
In drafting FACA, legislators wanted to ensure that advice by the various advisory committees is "objective and accessible to the public" by formalizing the process for "establishing, operating, overseeing, and terminating" the committees. The Committee Management Secretariat at the GSA is charged with monitoring compliance.

In particular the Act restricts the formation of such committees to only those which are deemed essential, limits their powers to provision of advice to officers and agencies in the executive branch of the Federal Government, and limits the length of term during which any such committee may operate. Further, FACA was an attempt by Congress to curtail the rampant "locker-room discussion" that had become prevalent in administrative decisions. These "locker-room discussion" are masked under titles like "task force", "subcommittee", and "working group" meetings, which are less than full FACA meetings and so they do not have to be open to the public. FACA declared that all administrative procedures and hearings were to be public knowledge.

== Legal requirements ==
=== Public notice ===
A committee must provide public notice in the Federal Register 15 days prior to holding a meeting. It must publish all information regarding the meeting, including committee name, the time, place, and purpose of the meeting, and a summary of the agenda. Additionally, if any part of the meeting is closed to the public, the notice must include the committee name; the time, place and purpose of the meeting; a summary of the agenda; and if any portion of the meeting is closed, the reason and exemption(s) in the Government in the Sunshine Act that apply. An advisory committee meeting can be closed to the public if the president or an agency head determines that any of the 10 exemptions to the Sunshine Act apply (see below). The committee must provide access to materials provided to it, including reports, transcripts, minutes, working papers, agendas or other documents unless any of the nine FOIA exemptions would apply. The committees must also keep minutes of their meetings.

== Amendments ==
In March 2012 the Government Accountability Office issued a report on FACA groups in DOT and DOE. In this report, they state:

"Advisory groups—those established under the Federal Advisory Committee Act (FACA) and other groups not subject to the act—can play an important role in the development of policy and government regulations. There are more than 1,000 FACA advisory groups and an unknown number of non-FACA advisory groups governmentwide. Non-FACA groups include intergovernmental groups. Section 21 of Pub. L. No. 111-139 requires GAO to conduct routine investigations to identify programs, agencies, offices, and initiatives with duplicative goals and activities. In that context, GAO reviewed (1) the extent to which the Department of Transportation’s (DOT) and Department of Energy’s (DOE) assessment process helps ensure advisory group efforts are not duplicative and what challenges, if any, exist in assessing potential duplication, and (2) to what extent DOT and DOE advisory groups are useful in assisting their respective agencies in carrying out their missions and how the groups’ usefulness could be enhanced." This review resulted in four recommendations geared toward preventing duplication of efforts among FACA groups.

== Criticism ==
FACA has drawn criticism as an unconstitutional infringement upon "long-recognized presidential powers" reserved to the President under Article II of the U.S. Constitution. Critics maintain that FACA "violates separation of powers by limiting the terms on which the President can acquire information from nongovernmental advisory committees".

== See also ==
- Government in the Sunshine Act (1976)
- Freedom of Information Act (United States) (1966)
- Open-source governance
