= Court administration =

Field of public administration on courts affair

Court administration, administration of courts or judicial administration is a field of public administration on back office affairs of court operation, including annual budgeting and human resource management.

== Models of court administration ==
While detailed hands-on practice of court administration differs in each of country by its own tradition and constitution, general models of court administration can be classified according to who leads core parts of it among branches of government, such as executive or judiciary.

=== Executive model ===
Executive model entails core parts of court administration, such as annual budgeting and appointment of judges, to responsible minister (mostly justice, treasury or interior minister) in cabinet inside executive branch of the government. Yet day-to-day parts of court administration, such as case assignment and appointment of court clerks, are usually delegated to chief judge of each court. Example of this model is Federal Courts of Germany, where Federal Ministry of Justice and Federal Ministry of Labour and Social Affairs takes authority for court administration.

=== Judicial / autonomous model ===
Judicial model, or autonomous model empowers judiciary itself to handle court administration. Example of this model is Federal judiciary of the United States, where Judicial Conference constituted by chief judge of each federal courts makes policy decision, and Administrative Office composed by the Chief Justice executes it.

=== Partnership / commission model ===
Partnership model or commission model makes both executive and judiciary mutually responsible for court administration, by creating joint independent commission. This commissions are usually called as 'council of the judiciary'. This model is popular in European countries, yet detailed mission of each 'council of the judiciary' varies. For example, 'French council of the judiciary (French: Conseil supérieur de la magistrature)' on French judiciary courts is only responsible for human resource management but not for annual budgeting.

== See also ==
- Administration of justice
- Council of the judiciary
  - Judicial Council (disambiguation)
  - National Courts Administration (disambiguation)
- Judicial interpretation
