= Fourth power (disambiguation) =

Fourth power is a mathematical operation.

It may also refer to:

- Fourth branch of government
- Fourth Estate
