= Chief judge (United States) =

Highest-ranking judge of a court

A chief judge (also known as presiding judge, president judge or principal judge) is the highest-ranking or most senior member of a lower court or circuit court with more than one judge. According to the federal judiciary of the United States, the chief judge has primary responsibility for the administration of the court. Chief judges are determined by seniority. The chief judge commonly presides over trials and hearings. In the Supreme Court of the United States the highest-ranking member is the chief justice of the United States.

== Federal ==
=== United States courts of appeals ===
In the United States courts of appeals, the chief judge has certain administrative responsibilities and presides over en banc sessions of the court and meetings of the Judicial Council. The chief judge remains an active judge of the court hearing and deciding cases, but at their option may elect to take on a reduced caseload to provide time to perform administrative responsibilities.

In order to qualify for the office of chief judge, a judge must have been in active service on the court for at least one year, be under the age of 65, and have not previously served as chief judge. A vacancy in the office of chief judge is filled by the judge highest in seniority among the group of qualified judges. The chief judge serves for a term of seven years or until age 70, whichever occurs first. The age restrictions are waived if no members of the court would otherwise be qualified for the position. Unlike the chief justice of the United States, a chief judge stays in active service after the expiration of their term and does not create a vacancy on the bench by the fact of their promotion. See 28 U.S.C. § 45.

These rules have applied since October 1, 1982. The office of chief judge was created effective September 1, 1948, replacing what had been known as the "Chief Justice" of the District of Columbia Circuit and the "Senior Circuit Court Judge" on the other circuits. Until August 6, 1959, it was filled by the longest-serving judge who had not elected to retire on what has since 1958 been known as senior status or declined to serve as chief judge. From then until October 1, 1982, it was filled by the senior such judge who had not turned 70.

Lists of the judges who have served as chief judge of each of the courts of appeals can be found in the articles for the respective circuits, such as United States Court of Appeals for the First Circuit.

=== United States district courts ===
In United States district courts with at least two judges, the chief judge has certain administrative responsibilities, including presiding over some meetings of the judges. The chief judge remains an active judge of the court hearing and deciding cases, but may take on a reduced caseload to perform administrative tasks. The qualifications for chief judge and the selection process are essentially the same for the district courts and for the courts of appeals. See 28 U.S.C. § 136.

=== Judicial Conference ===
The chief judge of each judicial circuit and the Chief Judge of the Court of International Trade are members — along with a district judge from each judicial circuit — of the Judicial Conference. The chief justice of the United States is the presiding officer of the Conference.

28 U.S.C. § 45 provides that chief judge of a circuit may serve seven years or until they attain the age of 70. There are some limited exceptions. Similar provisions apply for the Chief Judge of the Court of International Trade. See United States Code 258.

== New York ==
In the U.S. state of New York, the judge that presides over the state's highest court, the New York Court of Appeals, is titled the "chief judge". Similarly, their fellow jurists on that court are titled "judges", while jurists who sit on lower courts are titled "justices". This is the reverse of usage in other states, where jurists who sit on the state's highest court(s) are titled "justices" and those in lower courts are titled "judges".
