= Judicial Council =

Judicial Council may refer to:

- Canadian Judicial Council
- Judicial council (United States)
  - Judicial Council of California
  - New York State Commission on Judicial Conduct
  - Judicial Councils Reform and Judicial Conduct and Disability Act of 1980
- Kosovo Judicial Council
- Supreme Judicial Council of Libya
- Muslim Judicial Council
- Supreme Judicial Council of Pakistan
- Supreme Judicial Council of Saudi Arabia
- High Judicial Council (Syria)
- Judicial Council of the United Methodist Church
- National Council of Justice (Brazil)

== See also ==
- Council of the judiciary
- Judiciary committee (disambiguation)
- National Judicial Council (disambiguation)
