= Council of the judiciary =

In the European continental judicial tradition, the national councils of the judiciary (of simply judicial councils) are institutions on judicial administration that ensure the self-management of the judiciary and the effective delivery of justice, which are autonomous or independent of the executive and legislature.

At the European Union level, they are gathered in the European Network of Councils for the Judiciary (ENCJ).

== Role in the separation of powers ==
There is ongoing debate about the constitutional position of judicial councils within systems of separated powers. While some scholars view them as instruments of judicial self-governance intended to protect courts from executive and legislative interference, others argue that councils may function as a distinct governing fourth branch institution with authority that is not fully contained within the traditional three-branch model of government.

== National judicial councils in EU member states ==
- Belgium: Conseil Supérieur de la Justice / Hoge Raad voor de Justitie
- Bulgaria: Висш Съдебен Съвет / Supreme Judicial Council
- Croatia: Državno sudbeno vijeće
- Denmark: Domstolsstyrelsen
- Finland: Tuomioistuinvirasto / Domstolsverket / National Courts Administration
- France: Conseil Superieur de la Magistrature
- Greece: Ανώτατο Δικαστικό Συμβούλιο / Supreme Judicial Council of Civil and Criminal Justice
- Greece: Ανώτατο Δικαστικό Συμβούλιο Διοικητικής Δικαιοσύνης / Supreme Judicial Council for Administrative Justice
- Hungary: Országos Bírói Tanács / National Judicial Council
- Ireland: Comhairle na mBreithiúna / The Judicial Council
- Italy: Consiglio Superiore della Magistratura
- Italy: Consiglio di Presidenza della giustizia amministrativa
- Latvia: Tieslietu padome
- Lithuania: Teisėjų taryba
- Malta: Commission for the Administration of Justice of Malta
- Netherlands: Raad voor de rechtspraak
- Poland: Krajowa Rada Sądownictwa
- Portugal: Conselho Superior da Magistratura
- Romania: Consiliul Superior al Magistraturii
- Slovakia: Súdna rada Slovenskej republiky
- Slovenia: Vrhovno sodišče Republike Slovenije
- Spain: Consejo General del Poder Judicial

== Other national councils of the judiciary ==
- Albania: High Council of Prosecutors and High Judicial Council
- Brazil: Conselho Nacional de Justiça
- Bosnia and Herzegovina: Visoko sudsko i tužilačko vijeće BiH / High Judicial and Prosecutorial Council of Bosnia and Herzegovina
- Canada: Canadian Judicial Council
- Colombia: Superior Council of Judicature
- Kosovo: Kosovo Judicial Council
- Monaco: High Council of Judges and Prosecutors
- Montenegro: Judicial and Prosecutorial Councils of Montenegro
- Russia: Higher Judges' Qualifications Board, Council of Judges
- Serbia: High Judicial Council, State Prosecutorial Council
- Turkey: Council of Judges and Prosecutors
- Ukraine: High Council of Justice
- United Kingdom
  - England / Wales: Judges' Council of England and Wales
  - Northern Ireland: Judges' Council
  - Scotland: Judicial Council
- United States: Judicial Conference of the United States, with support from the Administrative Office of the United States Courts and judicial councils in each federal judicial circuit
  - California: Judicial Council of California

== See also ==
- Judicial Council
- Judiciary committee
- National Judicial Council
