= High Judicial and Prosecutorial Council of Republika Srpska =

- Високи судски и тужилачки савјет Републике Српске

Agency overview
- Formed: 6 March 2025
- Headquarters: Banja Luka

High Judicial and Prosecutorial Council of Republika Srpska (VSTS; Serbian: Високи судски и тужилачки савјет Републике Српске; Croatian: Visoko sudsko i tužiteljsko vijeće Republike Srpske; Bosnian: Visoko sudsko i tužilačko vijeće Republike Srpske) is the national council of the judiciary of Republika Srpska, one of the two political entities of Bosnia and Herzegovina. It is the self-regulatory body of the judiciary in the country, tasked with guaranteeing its independence, with countrywide competencies over the administration and career management of judicial office holders.

The VSTS was established on 5 March 2025, with the enactment of the Law on the High Judicial and Prosecutorial Council of Republika Srpska. The VSTV has thirteen members and is headed by a president, followed by two vice presidents, each of whom must be from one of the three constituent nations of Bosnia and Herzegovina.

== Bibliography ==
- "Šta donosi zakon o VSTS-u Republike Srpske?". ATV. Banja Luka. 3 March 2025.
