= High Council of Judges and Prosecutors (Monaco) =

Disciplinary body of the legal system of Monaco

The High Council of Judges and Prosecutors (French: Le Haut Conseil de la Magistrature) is a collegial body invested with a preponderant role within the framework of the administration of justice of the Principality of Monaco. The High Council of Judges and Prosecutors was instituted by the law n° 1364 of November 16, 2009 relating to the statute of the magistracy. In November 2018, the new members of the High Judicial Council have been introduced in their new functions, under the chairmanship of Laurent Anselmi, Director of Judicial Services.

== Mission ==
The High Council's mission is to ensure that fairness, equal treatment and all the principles that a rule of law must respect in the management of magistrates' careers are observed. The High Council is also called upon to exercise disciplinary power with regard to magistrates, the disciplinary procedure being surrounded by reinforced guarantees tending, in particular, to ensure respect for its adversarial nature. The High Council of Magistracy can be consulted by the Prince on any question relating to the organization and functioning of justice.

== Composition ==
The High Council of Judges and Prosecutors is composed of seven members and acts with no less than five members:

- President - The Secretary of Justice
- Vice-President - The First President of the Court of Revision
- A full member of the Crown Council
- A full member appointed by the National Council
- A full member appointed by the Supreme Court
- Two members elected by the judges

=== Members ===
As of 2021 the members of the High Council of Judges and Prosecutors are:

==== Full members ====
- Philippe Orengo, appointed by the Crown Council;
- Yves Strickler, appointed by the National Council;
- Dominique Adam, appointed by the Supreme Court;
- Éric Senna, Counselor at the Court of Appeal, elected by the second college of the judiciary;
- Magali Ghenassia, Vice-president at the Court of First Instance, elected by the first college of the judiciary.

==== Alternate members ====
- Laurent Le Mesle, Advisor to the Court of Revision, appointed by the said Court to replace the Vice-president ex officio;
- Olivier Echappe, Counselor at the French Court of Cassation, appointed by the Crown Council;
- Béatrice Bardy, appointed by the National Council;
- Mathieu Disant, Associate Professor of the Faculties of Law, Professor at the University Jean Monnet - Lyon Saint-Étienne, appointed by the Supreme Court;
- Adrien Candau, Judge at the Court of First Instance, elected by the first college of the judiciary;
- Cyrielle Colle, First Substitute of the Attorney General, elected by the second college of the judiciary.
