= Judicial Councils Reform and Judicial Conduct and Disability Act of 1980 =

Federal law concerning judicial misconduct and disability

- Other short titles: Judicial Conduct and Disability Act of 1980
- Long title: An act to revise the composition of the judicial councils of the Federal judicial circuits, to establish a procedure for the processing of complaints against Federal judges, and for other purposes.
- Enacted by: the 96th United States Congress

Citations
- Public law: Pub. L. 96–458
- Statutes at Large: 94 Stat. 2035

Codification
- Titles amended: 28 U.S.C.: Judiciary and Judicial Procedure

Legislative history
- Introduced in the Senate by Dennis DeConcini D‑AZ on October 10, 1979; Passed the Senate on October 30, 1979; Passed the House on September 15, 1980; Signed into law by President Jimmy Carter on October 15, 1980

The Judicial Councils Reform and Judicial Conduct and Disability Act of 1980, Pub. L. 96–458, 94 Stat. 2035, also known as the Judicial Conduct and Disability Act of 1980, is a United States federal law concerning misconduct and disability on the part of article III judges. It was signed into law by President Jimmy Carter on October 15, 1980. Congress enacted this statute to facilitate the discipline of judges for misconduct or disability that does not rise to the level of an impeachable offense. The statute allows an individual to file a complaint against a federal judge if they believe that the judge has engaged in conduct "prejudicial to the effective and expeditious administration of the business of the courts", or that the judge's mental faculties have declined such that they are now "unable to discharge all the duties" required of their office. The Act delegates primary responsibility for adjudicating complaints to the judicial councils of the United States courts of appeals, beginning with the submission of a complaint to the clerk for the corresponding circuit court of appeals. It does not apply to the justices of the Supreme Court of the United States.

== See also ==
- Judicial council (United States)
  - Judicial Council of California
  - New York State Commission on Judicial Conduct
