= Fifth Estate =

Socio-cultural grouping

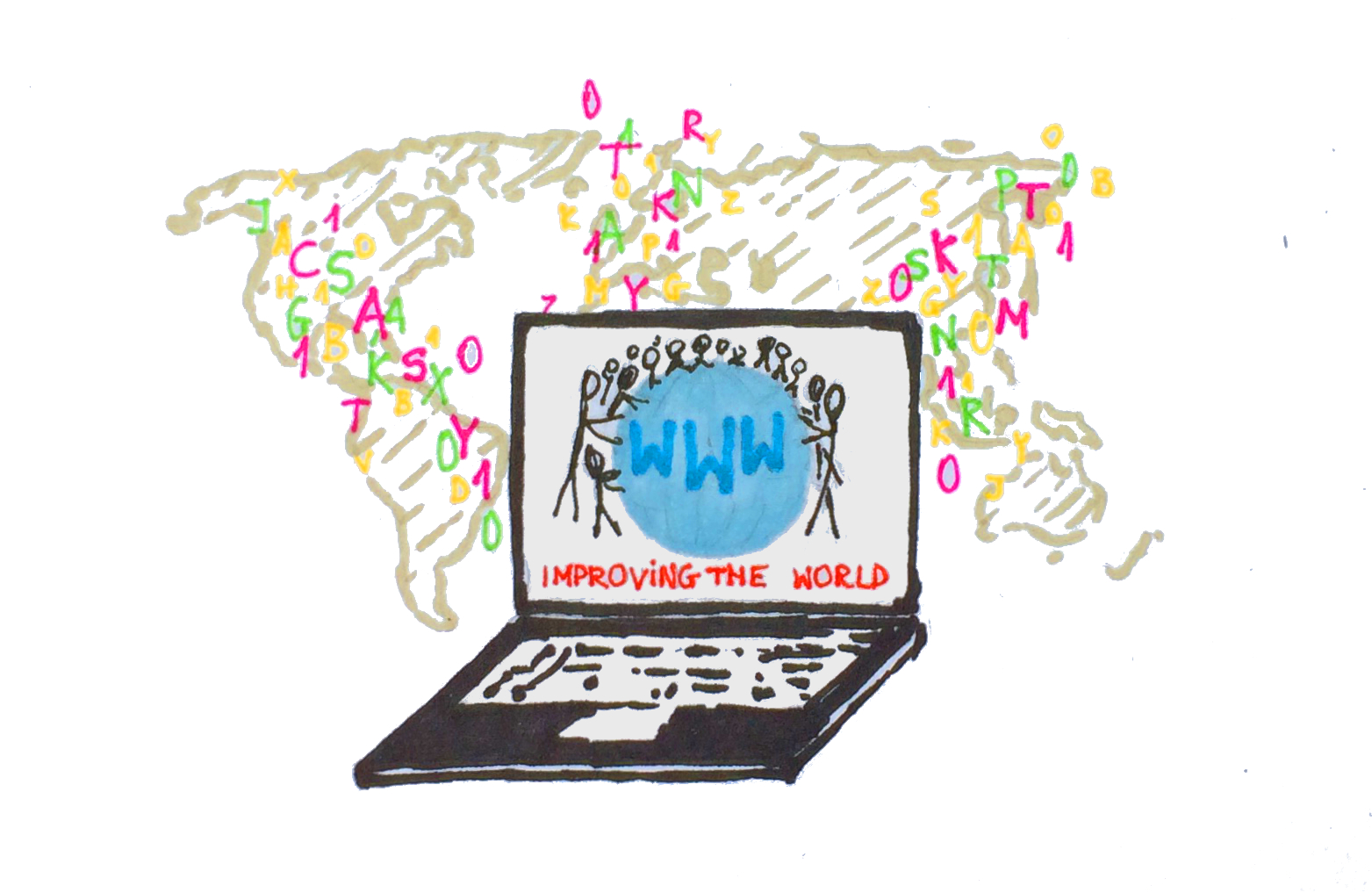
The fifth estate, Internet resources.

The Fifth Estate is a socio-cultural reference to groupings of outlier viewpoints in contemporary society, and is most associated with bloggers, journalists publishing in non-mainstream media outlets, and online social networks. The "Fifth" Estate extends the sequence of the three classical estates (clergy (first), nobility (second), commoners (third)) and the preceding Fourth Estate, essentially the common press. The use of "fifth estate" dates to the 1960s counterculture, and in particular the influential Fifth Estate, an underground newspaper first published in Detroit in 1965. Web-based technologies have enhanced the scope and power of the Fifth Estate far beyond the modest and boutique conditions of its beginnings.

Nimmo and Combs asserted in 1992 that political pundits constitute a Fifth Estate. Media researcher Stephen D. Cooper argued in 2006 that bloggers are the Fifth Estate. In 2009, William Dutton argued that the Fifth Estate is not just the blogging community, nor an extension of the media, but "networked individuals" enabled by the Internet, e.g. social media, in ways that can hold the other estates accountable.

== See also ==
- Fourth branch of government
- Gossip
