= Estates of the realm =

Broad orders of social hierarchy

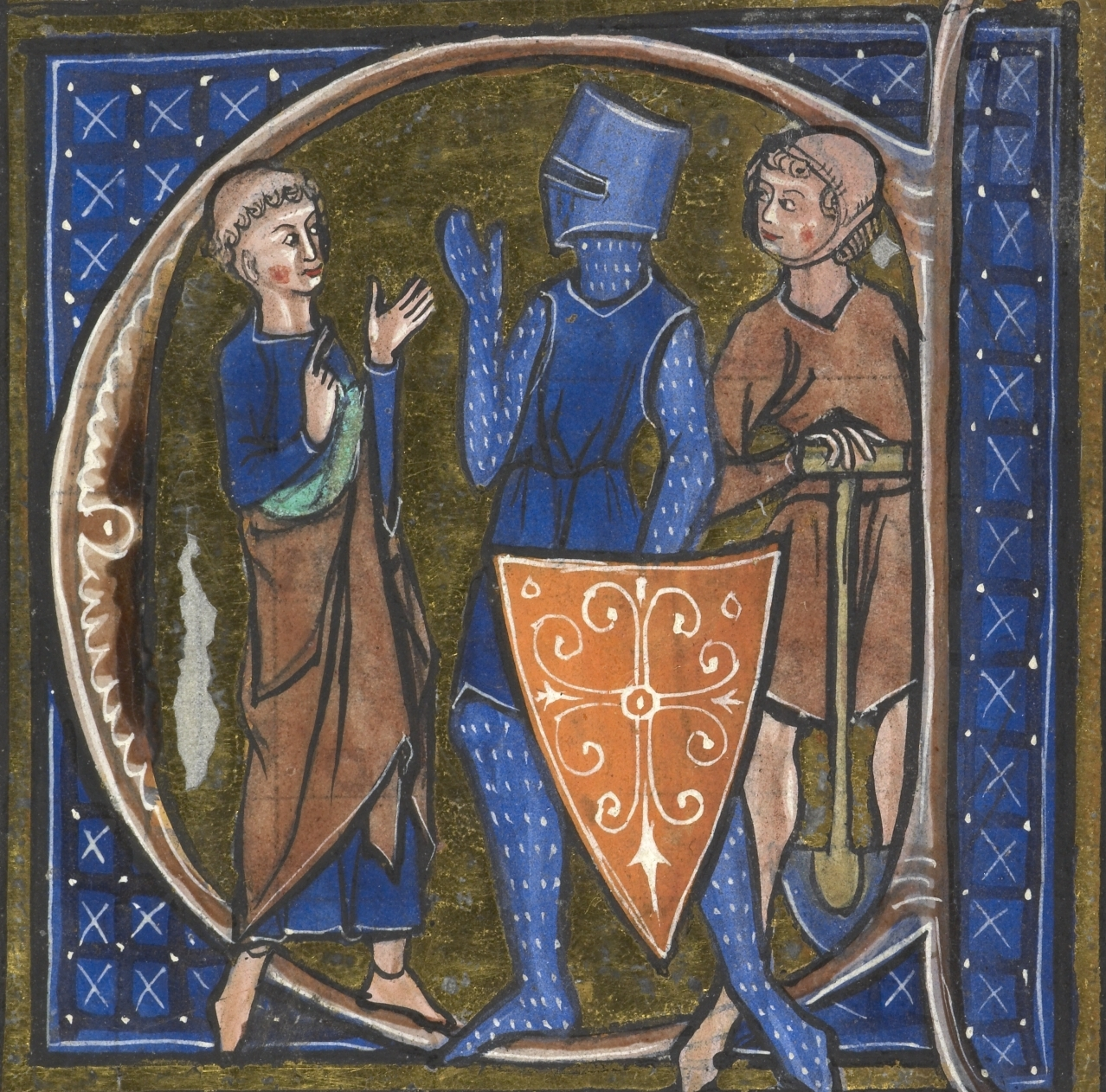
A 13th-century French representation of the tripartite social order of the Middle Ages – Oratores ("those who pray"), Bellatores ("those who fight"), and Laboratores ("those who work").

The estates of the realm, or three estates, were the broad orders of social hierarchy used in Christendom from the Middle Ages to early modern Europe. Different systems for dividing society members into estates developed and evolved over time.

- The best known system is the French ancien régime (old regime), a three-estate system which was made up of a First Estate of clergy, a Second Estate of titled nobles, and a Third Estate of all other subjects (both peasants and bourgeoisie).
- In some regions, notably Sweden and Russia, burghers (the urban merchant class) and rural commoners were split into separate estates, creating a four-estate system with rural commoners ranking the lowest as the Fourth Estate.
- In Norway, the taxpaying classes were considered as one, and with a very small aristocracy; this class/estate was as powerful as the monarchy itself. In Denmark, however, only owners of large tracts of land had any influence. Furthermore, the non-landowning poor could be left outside the estates, leaving them without political rights.
- In England, a two-estate system evolved that combined nobility and clergy into one lordly estate with "commons" as the second estate. This system produced the two houses of parliament, the House of Commons and the House of Lords.
- In southern Germany, a three-estate system of nobility (princes and high clergy), knights, and burghers was used; this system excluded lower clergy and peasants altogether.
- In Scotland, the Three Estates were the Clergy (First Estate), Nobility (Second Estate), and Shire Commissioners, or "burghers" (Third Estate), representing the bourgeoisie and lower commoners. The Estates made up a Scottish Parliament.

Today, the terms three estates and estates of the realm may sometimes be reinterpreted to refer to the modern separation of powers in government into the legislature, administration, and the judiciary. The modern term the fourth estate invokes medieval three-estate systems, and usually refers to some particular force outside that medieval power structure, most commonly the independent press or the mass media.

== Social mobility ==
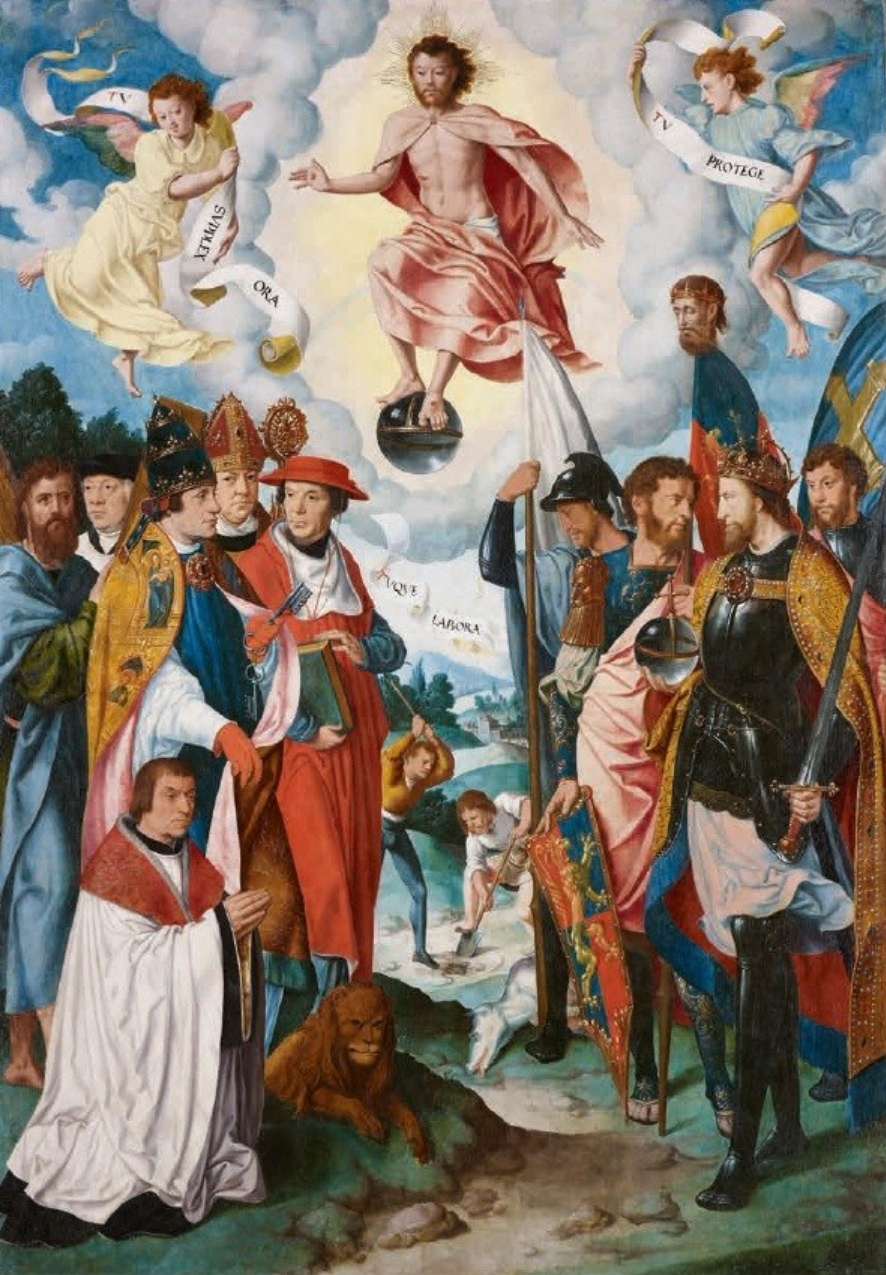
The Three Estates of Christendom by Bartholomäus Bruyn c. 1535

During the Middle Ages, advancing to different social classes was uncommon and difficult, and when it did happen, it generally took the form of a gradual increase in status over several generations of a family rather than within a single lifetime.

One field in which commoners could appreciably advance within a single lifetime was the Church. The medieval Church was an institution where social mobility was most likely achieved up to a certain level (generally to that of vicar general or abbot/abbess for commoners). Typically, only nobility were appointed to the highest church positions (bishops, archbishops, heads of religious orders, etc.), although low nobility could aspire to the highest church positions. Since clergy could not marry, such mobility was theoretically limited to one generation. Nepotism was common in this period.

== Dynamics ==
Johan Huizinga observed that "Medieval political speculation is imbued to the marrow with the idea of a structure of society based upon distinct orders". The virtually synonymous terms estate and order designated a great variety of social realities, not at all limited to a class, Huizinga concluded applying to every social function, every trade, every recognisable grouping.

There are, first of all, the estates of the realm, but there are also the trades, the state of matrimony and that of virginity, the state of sin. At court, there are the 'four estates of the body and mouth': bread-masters, cup-bearers, carvers, and cooks. In the Church, there are sacerdotal orders and monastic orders. Finally there are the different orders of chivalry.

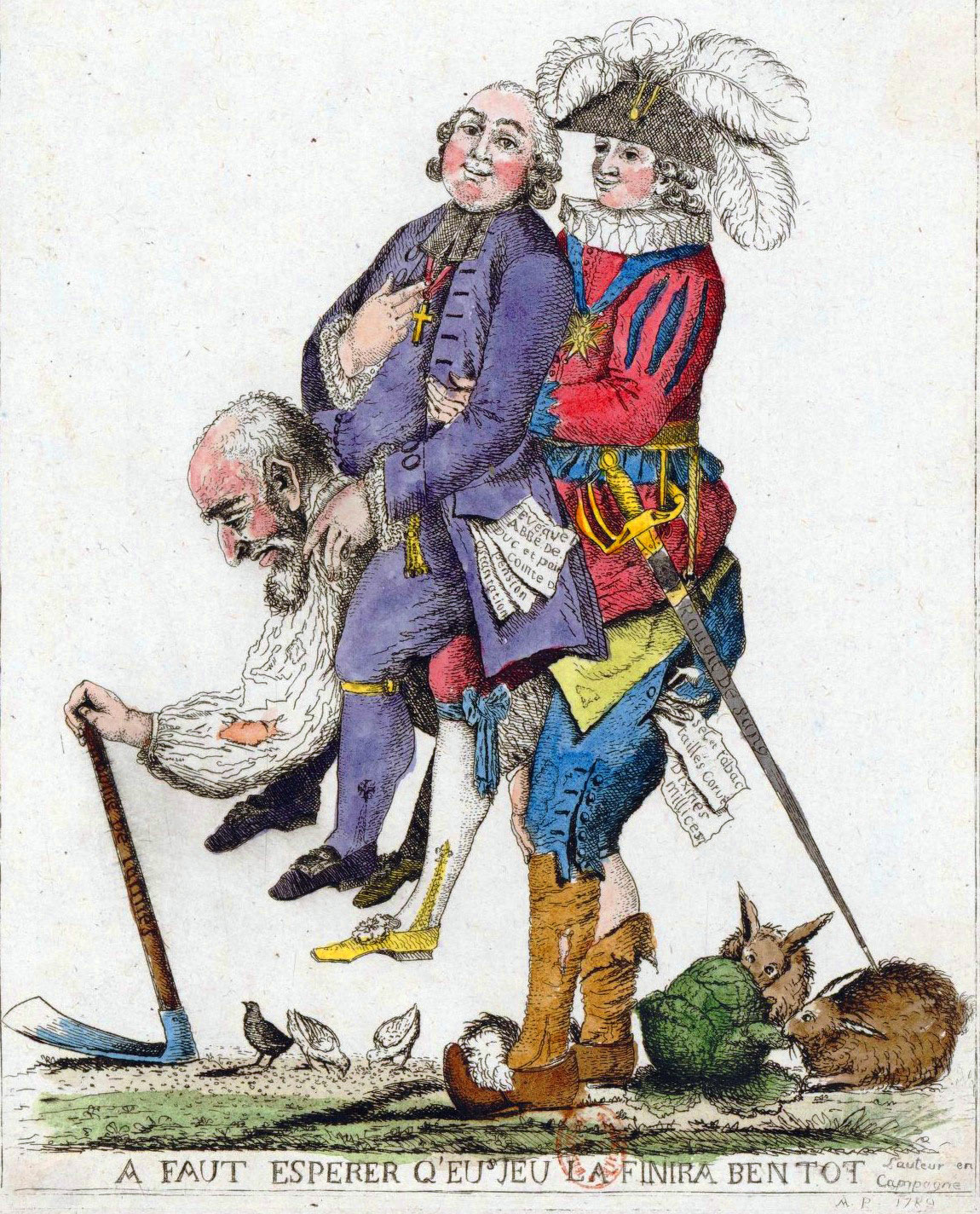
Satire of the three estates from 1789; the hard-working Third Estate carries the lazy nobility and clergy. The legend reads A faut espérer q[u]'eu jeu là finira b[i]entôt ("Hopefully, this game will be over soon"), prefiguring the French Revolution.

This static view of society was predicated on inherited positions. Commoners were universally considered the lowest order. The higher estates' necessary dependency on the commoners' production, however, often further divided the otherwise equal common people into burghers (also known as bourgeoisie) of the realm's cities and towns, and the peasants and serfs of the realm's surrounding lands and villages. A person's estate and position within it were usually inherited from their father and his occupation, resembling a caste system. In many regions and realms, there also existed population groups born outside these specifically defined resident estates.

The estates of the realm were not merely descriptive or informal divisions. The legal and political status of a person was strongly dependent on his estate. Medieval law was usually not codified or uniform, but the sources of law were diverse. Different laws applied to different estates, and the estates held distinct privileges. A nobleman or cleric could not be sentenced by an ordinary court. One set of laws governed the conduct of the merchants, another governed the feudal system, and the church was governed by its own laws. The application of canon law, which originated in the church, was more widespread than in modern times. The expressions of these rights varied by country. For instance, in Sweden, the right to conduct international trade was subject to licensing and typically only given to burghers. In some countries, non-nobles were legally prohibited from wearing clothing that was considered too luxurious by sumptuary laws.

Legislative bodies or advisory bodies to a monarch were traditionally grouped along lines of these estates, with the monarch above all three estates. Meetings of the estates of the realm became early legislative and judicial parliaments. Monarchs often sought to legitimize their power by requiring oaths of fealty from the estates. Today, in most countries, the estates have lost all their legal privileges, and are mainly of historical interest. The nobility may be an exception, for instance due to legislation against false titles of nobility.

One of the earliest political pamphlets to address these ideas was called "What Is the Third Estate?" (French: Qu'est-ce que le tiers-état?) It was written by Abbé Emmanuel Joseph Sieyès in January 1789, shortly before the start of the French Revolution.

== Background ==
The hereditary status of the estates had a precursor in Emperor Diocletian's reforms in the 3rd century, where Diocletian made certain "essential" occupations hereditary. Peasants became tied to their land, and sons of soldiers were forcibly conscripted to the army. Essential occupations included also bakers, armorers, tenant farmers and members of town councils. This significantly restricted social mobility. In essence, by establishing hereditary occupations, which later became the estates of the realm of medieval Europe, Diocletian laid the foundation for feudalism, the political system that would reign over Europe for the following thousand years. Emperor Constantine further entrenched these policies and widened their application in the 4th century.

After the fall of the Western Roman Empire, numerous geographic and ethnic kingdoms developed among the endemic peoples of Europe, affecting their day-to-day secular lives; along with those, the growing influence of the Catholic Church and its Papacy affected the ethical, moral and religious lives and decisions of all. This led to mutual dependency between the secular and religious powers for guidance and protection, but over time and with the growing power of the kingdoms, competing secular realities increasingly diverged from religious idealism and Church decisions.

The new lords of the land identified themselves primarily as warriors, but because new technologies of warfare were expensive, and the fighting men required substantial material resources and considerable leisure to train, these needs had to be filled. The economic and political transformation of the countryside in the period were filled by a large growth in population, agricultural production, technological innovations and urban centers; movements of reform and renewal attempted to sharpen the distinction between clerical and lay status, and power, recognized by the Church also had their effect.

In his book The Three Orders: Feudal Society Imagined, the French medievalist Georges Duby has shown that in the period 1023–1025 the first theorist who justified the division of European society into the three estates of the realm was Gerard of Florennes, the bishop of Cambrai.

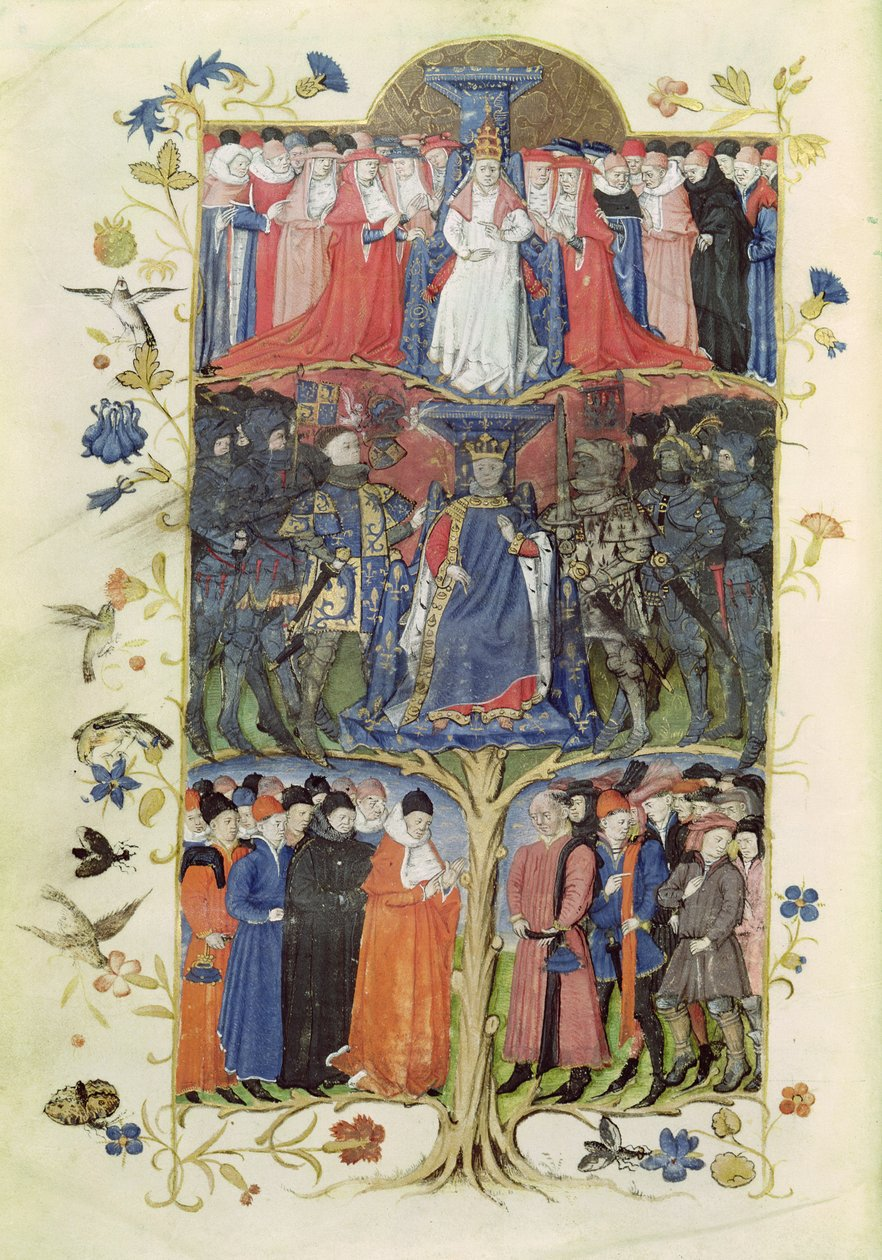
French miniature depicting the Three Estates, with King Charles VII at centre, 1400/50

As a result of the Investiture Controversy of the late 11th and early 12th centuries, the powerful office of Holy Roman Emperor lost much of its religious character and retained a more nominal universal preeminence over other rulers, though it varied. The struggle over investiture and the reform movement also legitimized all secular authorities, partly on the grounds of their obligation to enforce discipline.

In the 11th and 12th centuries, thinkers argued that human society consisted of three orders: those who pray, those who fight, and those who labour. The structure of the first order, the clergy, was in place by 1200 and remained singly intact until the religious reformations of the 16th century. The second order, those who fight, was the rank of the politically powerful, ambitious, and dangerous. Kings took pains to ensure that it did not resist their authority. The general category of those who labour (specifically, those who were not knightly warriors or nobles) diversified rapidly after the 11th century into the lively and energetic worlds of peasants, skilled artisans, merchants, financiers, lay professionals, and entrepreneurs, which together drove the European economy to its greatest achievements.

By the 12th century, most European political thinkers agreed that monarchy was the ideal form of governance. This was because it imitated on earth the model set by God for the universe; it was the form of government of the ancient Hebrews and the Christian Biblical basis, the later Roman Empire, and also the peoples who succeeded Rome after the 4th century.

== Kingdom of France ==
France under the ancien régime (before the French Revolution) divided society into three estates: the First Estate (clergy); the Second Estate (nobility); and the Third Estate (commoners). The king was not part of any estate.

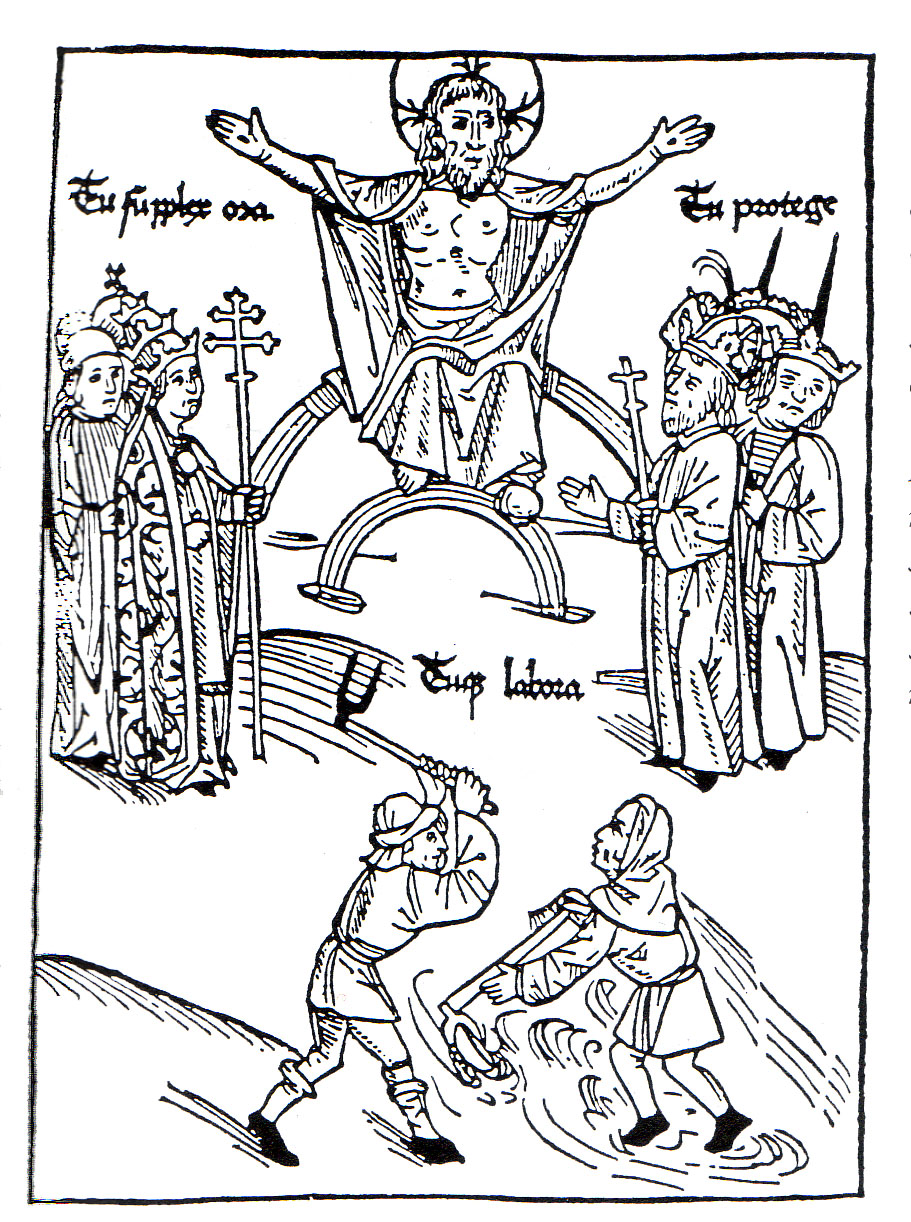
Representation of the Three Estates under the lordship of Jesus Christ. They are labeled Tu supplex ora (you pray), Tu protege (you protect), Tuque labora (and you work).

=== First Estate ===
The First Estate comprised the entire clergy and the religious orders, traditionally divided into "higher" and "lower" clergy. Although there was no formally recognized demarcation between the two categories, the upper clergy were, effectively, clerical nobility, from Second Estate families. In the time of Louis XVI, every bishop in France was a nobleman, a situation that had not existed before the 18th century.

The "lower clergy" (about equally divided between parish priests, monks, and nuns) constituted about 90 percent of the First Estate, which in 1789 numbered around 130,000 (about 0.5% of the population).

=== Second Estate ===
The Second Estate (deuxieme état) was the French nobility and (technically, though not in common use) royalty, other than the monarch himself, who stood outside of the system of estates.

The Second Estate is traditionally divided into noblesse d'épée ("nobility of the sword"), and noblesse de robe ("nobility of the robe"), the magisterial class that administered royal justice and civil government.

The Second Estate constituted approximately 1.5% of France's population. Under the ancien régime ("old rule/old government", i.e. before the revolution), the Second Estate were exempt from the corvée royale (forced labor on the roads) and from most other forms of taxation such as the gabelle (salt tax), and most important, the taille (France's oldest form of direct taxation). This exemption from paying taxes was a major reason for their opposition to political reform.

=== Third Estate ===
The Third Estate (Tiers état) comprised all of those who were not members of either of the above, and can be divided into two groups, urban and rural, together making up over 98% of France's population. The urban included wage-labourers. The rural included free peasants (who owned their own land and could be prosperous) and villeins (serfs, or peasants working on a noble's land). The free peasants paid disproportionately high taxes compared to the other Estates and were unhappy because they wanted more rights. In addition, the First and Second Estates relied on the labour of the Third, which made the latter's inferior status all the more glaring.

There were an estimated 27 million paysans in the Third Estate when the French Revolution started.

They had a hard life of physical labour and food shortages. Most people were born in this group, and most remained in it for their entire lives. It was extremely rare for people of this ascribed status to become part of another estate; those who did were usually being rewarded for extraordinary bravery in battle, or entering religious life. A few commoners were able to marry into the Second Estate, but this was a rare occurrence.

=== Estates General ===
The Estates General (not to be confused with a "class of citizen") was a general citizens' assembly that was first called by Philip IV in 1302 and then met intermittently at the request of the King until 1614; after that, it was not called again for over 170 years.

In the period leading up to the Estates General of 1789, France was in the grip of an unmanageable public debt. In May 1776, finance minister Turgot was dismissed, after failing to enact reforms. The next year, Jacques Necker, a foreigner, was appointed Controller-General of Finances. (He could not officially be made the finance minister because he was a Protestant.) Drastic inflation and simultaneous scarcity of food created a major famine in the winter of 1788–89. This led to widespread discontent, and produced a group of Third Estate representatives (612 exactly) pressing a comparatively radical set of reforms, much of it in alignment with the goals of acting finance minister Jacques Necker, but very much against the wishes of Louis XVI's court and many of the hereditary nobles who were his Second Estate allies (allies at least to the extent that they were against being taxed themselves and in favour of maintaining high taxation for commoners).

Louis XVI called a meeting of the Estates General to deal with the economic problems and quell the growing discontent, but when he could not persuade them to rubber-stamp his 'ideal program', he sought to dissolve the assembly and take legislation into his own hands. However, the Third Estate held out for their right to representation. The lower clergy (and some nobles and upper clergy) eventually sided with the Third Estate, and the King was forced to yield. Thus, the 1789 Estates General meeting became an invitation to revolution.

By June, when continued impasses led to further deterioration in relations, the Estates General was reconstituted in a different form, first as the National Assembly (June 17, 1789), seeking a solution independent of the King's management. (The Estates General, under that name and directed by the King, did continue to meet occasionally.) These independently-organized meetings are now seen as the epoch event of the French Revolution, during which – after several more weeks of civil unrest – the body assumed a new status as a revolutionary legislature, the National Constituent Assembly (July 9, 1789).

This unitary body of former representatives of the three estates began governing, along with an emergency committee, in the power vacuum after the Bourbon monarchy fled from Paris. Among the Assembly was Maximilien Robespierre, an influential president of the Jacobins who would years later become instrumental in the turbulent period of violence and political upheaval in France known as the Reign of Terror (5 September 1793 – 28 July 1794).

== Great Britain and Ireland ==
Whilst the estates were never formulated in a way that prevented social mobility, the English (subsequently the British) parliament was formed along the classic estate lines, being composed of the "Lords Spiritual and Temporal, and Commons". The tradition where the Lords Spiritual and Temporal sat separately from the Commons began during the reign of Edward III in the 14th century.

Notwithstanding the House of Lords Act 1999, the British Parliament still recognises the existence of the three estates: the Commons in the House of Commons, the nobility (Lords Temporal) in the House of Lords, and the clergy in the form of the Church of England bishops also entitled to sit in the upper House as the Lords Spiritual.

=== Scotland ===
The members of the Parliament of Scotland were collectively referred to as the Three Estates (Older Scots: Thre Estaitis), also known from 1290 as the community of the realm (Latin: communitas regni), and until 1690 composed of:

- the first estate of prelates (bishops and abbots)
- the second estate of lairds (dukes, earls, lords of parliament (after 1437), barons and lay tenants-in-chief)
- the third estate of burgh commissioners (representatives chosen by the royal burghs)

The First Estate was overthrown during the Glorious Revolution and the accession of William III. The Second Estate was then split into two to retain the division into three.

A shire commissioner was the closest equivalent of the English office of Member of Parliament, namely a commoner or member of the lower nobility. Because the Parliament of Scotland was unicameral, all members sat in the same chamber, as opposed to the separate English House of Lords and House of Commons.

The parliament also had university constituencies (see Ancient universities of Scotland). The system was also adopted by the Parliament of England when James VI ascended to the English throne. It was believed that the universities were affected by the decisions of Parliament and ought therefore to have representation in it. This continued in the Parliament of Great Britain after 1707 and the Parliament of the United Kingdom until 1950.

=== Ireland ===
After the 12th-century Norman invasion of Ireland, administration of the Anglo-Norman Lordship of Ireland was modelled on that of the Kingdom of England. As in England, the Parliament of Ireland evolved out of the Magnum Concilium "great council" summoned by the chief governor of Ireland, attended by the council (curia regis), magnates (feudal lords), and prelates (bishops and abbots). Membership was based on fealty to the king, and the preservation of the king's peace, and so the fluctuating number of autonomous Irish Gaelic kings were outside of the system; they had their own local brehon law taxation arrangements. Elected representatives are first attested in 1297 and continually from the later 14th century. In 1297, counties were first represented by elected knights of the shire (sheriffs had previously represented them). In 1299, towns were represented. From the 14th century, a distinction from the English parliament was that deliberations on church funding were held in Parliament rather than in Convocation. The separation of the Irish House of Lords from the elected Irish House of Commons had developed by the fifteenth century. The clerical proctors elected by the lower clergy of each diocese formed a separate house or estate until 1537, when they were expelled for their opposition to the Irish Reformation. The Parliament of Ireland was dissolved after the Act of Union 1800, and instead Ireland was joined to the Kingdom of Great Britain to form the United Kingdom; 100 Irish MPs instead represented the Third Estate in the House of Commons in London, while a selection of hereditary peers (typically about 28 representative peers) represented the Irish nobility in the House of Lords. In addition, four seats as Lords Spiritual were reserved for Church of Ireland clergy: one archbishop and three bishops at a time, alternating place after each legislative session. After the disestablishment of the Church of Ireland in 1871, no more seats were created for Irish bishops.

== Sweden and Finland ==
The Estates in Sweden (including Finland) and later also Russia's Grand Duchy of Finland were the two higher estates, nobility and clergy, and the two lower estates, burghers and land-owning peasants. Each were free men, and had specific rights and responsibilities, and the right to send representatives to the Riksdag of the Estates. The Riksdag, and later the Diet of Finland was tetracameral: at the Riksdag, each Estate voted as a single body. Since early 18th century, a bill needed the approval of at least three Estates to pass, and constitutional amendments required the approval of all Estates. Prior to the 18th century, the King had the right to cast a deciding vote if the Estates were split evenly.

After Russia's conquest of Finland in 1809, the estates in Finland swore an oath to the Emperor in the Diet of Porvoo. A Finnish House of Nobility was codified in 1818 in accordance with the old Swedish law of 1723. However, after the Diet of Porvoo, the Diet of Finland was reconvened only in 1863. In the meantime, for a period of 54 years, the country was governed only administratively.

There was also a population outside the estates. Unlike in other areas, people had no "default" estate, and were not peasants unless they came from a land-owner's family. A summary of this division is:

- Nobility (see Finnish nobility and Swedish nobility) was exempt from tax, had an inherited rank and the right to keep a fief, and had a tradition of military service and government. Nobility was codified in 1280 with the Swedish king granting exemption from taxation (frälse) to land-owners that could equip a cavalryman (or be one themselves) for the king's army. Around 1400, letters patent were introduced, in 1561 the ranks of Count and Baron were added, and in 1625 the House of Nobility was codified as the First Estate of the land. Following Axel Oxenstierna's reform, higher government offices were open only to nobles. However, the nobility still owned only their own property, not the peasants or their land as in much of Europe. Heads of the noble houses were hereditary members of the assembly of nobles. The Nobility is divided into titled nobility (counts and barons) and lower nobility. Until the 18th century, the lower nobility was in turn divided into Knights and Esquires such that each of the three classes would first vote internally, giving one vote per class in the assembly. This resulted in great political influence for the higher nobility.
- Clergy, or priests, were exempt from tax, and collected tithes for the church. After the Swedish Reformation, the church became Lutheran. In later centuries, the estate included teachers of universities and certain state schools. The estate was governed by the state church which consecrated its ministers and appointed them to positions with a vote in choosing diet representatives.
- Burghers were city-dwellers, tradesmen and craftsmen. Trade was allowed only in the cities when the mercantilistic ideology had got the upper hand, and the burghers had the exclusive right to conduct commerce within the framework of guilds. Entry to this Estate was controlled by the autonomy of the towns themselves. Peasants were allowed to sell their produce within the city limits, but any further trade, particularly foreign trade, was allowed only for burghers. In order for a settlement to become a city, a royal charter granting market right was required, and foreign trade required royally chartered staple port rights. After the annexation of Finland into Imperial Russia in 1809, mill-owners and other proto-industrialists would gradually be included in this estate.
- Peasants were land-owners of land-taxed farms and their families (comparable in status to yeomen in England), which represented the majority in medieval times. Since most of the population were independent farmer families until the 19th century, not serfs nor villeins, there is a remarkable difference in tradition compared to other European countries. Entry was controlled by ownership of farmland, which was not generally for sale but a hereditary property. After 1809, Swedish tenants renting a large enough farm (ten times larger than what was required of peasants owning their own farm) were included as well as non-nobility owning tax-exempt land. Their representatives to the Diet were elected indirectly: each municipality sent electors to elect the representative of an electoral district.
- To no estate belonged propertyless cottagers, villeins, tenants of farms owned by others, farmhands, servants, some lower administrative workers, rural craftsmen, travelling salesmen, vagrants, and propertyless and unemployed people (who sometimes lived in strangers' houses). To reflect how the people belonging to the estates saw them, the Finnish word for "obscene", säädytön, has the literal meaning "estateless". They had no political rights and could not vote. Their mobility was severely limited by the policy of "legal protection" (Finnish: laillinen suojelu): every estateless person had to be employed by a taxed citizen from the estates, or they could be charged with vagrancy and sentenced to forced labor. In Finland, this policy lasted until 1883.

In Sweden, the Riksdag of the Estates existed until it was replaced with a bicameral Riksdag in 1866, which gave political rights to anyone with a certain income or property. Nevertheless, many of the leading politicians of the 19th century continued to be drawn from the old estates, in that they were either noblemen themselves, or represented agricultural and urban interests. Ennoblements continued even after the estates had lost their political importance, with the last ennoblement of explorer Sven Hedin taking place in 1902; this practice was formally abolished with the adoption of the new Constitution January 1, 1975, while the status of the House of Nobility continued to be regulated in law until 2003.

In Finland, this legal division existed until 1906, still drawing on the Swedish constitution of 1772. However, at the start of the 20th century most of the population did not belong to any Estate and had no political representation. A particularly large class were the rent farmers, who did not own the land they cultivated but had to work in the land-owner's farm to pay their rent (unlike Russia, there were no slaves or serfs.) Furthermore, the industrial workers living in the city were not represented by the four-estate system.

The political system was reformed as a result of the Finnish general strike of 1905, with the last Diet instituting a new constitutional law to create the modern parliamentary system, ending the political privileges of the estates. The post-independence constitution of 1919 forbade ennoblement, and all tax privileges were abolished in 1920. The privileges of the estates were officially and finally abolished in 1995, although in legal practice, the privileges had long been unenforceable. As in Sweden, the nobility has not been officially abolished and records of nobility are still voluntarily maintained by the Finnish House of Nobility.

In Finland, it is still illegal and punishable by jail time (up to one year) to defraud into marriage by declaring a false name or estate (Rikoslaki 18 luku § 1/Strafflagen 18 kap. § 1).

== Low Countries ==
The Low Countries, which until the late sixteenth century consisted of several counties, prince bishoprics, duchies etc. in the area that is now modern Belgium, Luxembourg and the Netherlands, had no States General until 1464, when Duke Philip of Burgundy assembled the first States General in Bruges. Later in the 15th and 16th centuries, Brussels became the place where the States General assembled. On these occasions, deputies from the States of the various provinces (as the counties, prince-bishoprics and duchies were called) asked for more liberties. For this reason, the States General were not assembled very often.

As a consequence of the Union of Utrecht in 1579 and the events that followed afterwards, the States General declared that they no longer obeyed King Philip II of Spain, who was also overlord of the Netherlands. After the reconquest of the southern Netherlands (roughly Belgium and Luxemburg), the States General of the Dutch Republic first assembled permanently in Middelburg, and in The Hague from 1585 onward. Without a king to rule the country, the States General became the sovereign power. It was the level of government where all things were dealt with that were of concern to all the seven provinces that became part of the Republic of the United Netherlands.

During that time, the States General were formed by representatives of the States (i.e. provincial parliaments) of the seven provinces. In each States (a plurale tantum) sat representatives of the nobility and the cities. The States of Utrecht were the only provincial estates in which the clergy remained nominally represented as the First Estate. This representation took the form of geëligeerden (all Protestants), delegated by the secularised chapters of five collegiate churches that administered extensive landed estates. In Friesland the peasants were indirectly represented by grietmannen.

In the Southern Netherlands, the last meetings of the States General loyal to the Habsburgs took place in the Estates General of 1600 and the Estates General of 1632.

As a government, the States General of the Dutch Republic were abolished in 1795. A new parliament was created, called Nationale Vergadering (National Assembly). It no longer consisted of representatives of the States, let alone the Estates: all men were considered equal under the 1798 Constitution. Eventually, the Netherlands became part of the French Empire under Napoleon (1810: La Hollande est reunie à l'Empire).

After regaining independence in November 1813, the name "States General" was resurrected for a legislature constituted in 1814 and elected by the States-Provincial. In 1815, when the Netherlands were united with Belgium and Luxemburg, the States General were divided into two chambers: the First Chamber and the Second Chamber. The members of the First Chamber were appointed for life by the King, while the members of the Second Chamber were elected by the members of the States Provincial. The States General resided in The Hague and Brussels in alternate years until 1830, when, as a result of the Belgian Revolution, The Hague became once again the sole residence of the States General, Brussels instead hosting the newly founded Belgian Parliament.

From 1848 on, the Dutch Constitution provides that members of the Second Chamber be elected by the people (at first only by a limited portion of the male population; universal male and female suffrage exists since 1919), while the members of the First Chamber are chosen by the members of the States Provincial. As a result, the Second Chamber became the most important. The First Chamber is also called Senate. This however, is not a term used in the Constitution.

Occasionally, the First and Second Chamber meet in a Verenigde Vergadering (Joint Session), for instance on Prinsjesdag, the annual opening of the parliamentary year, and when a new king is inaugurated.

== Holy Roman Empire ==
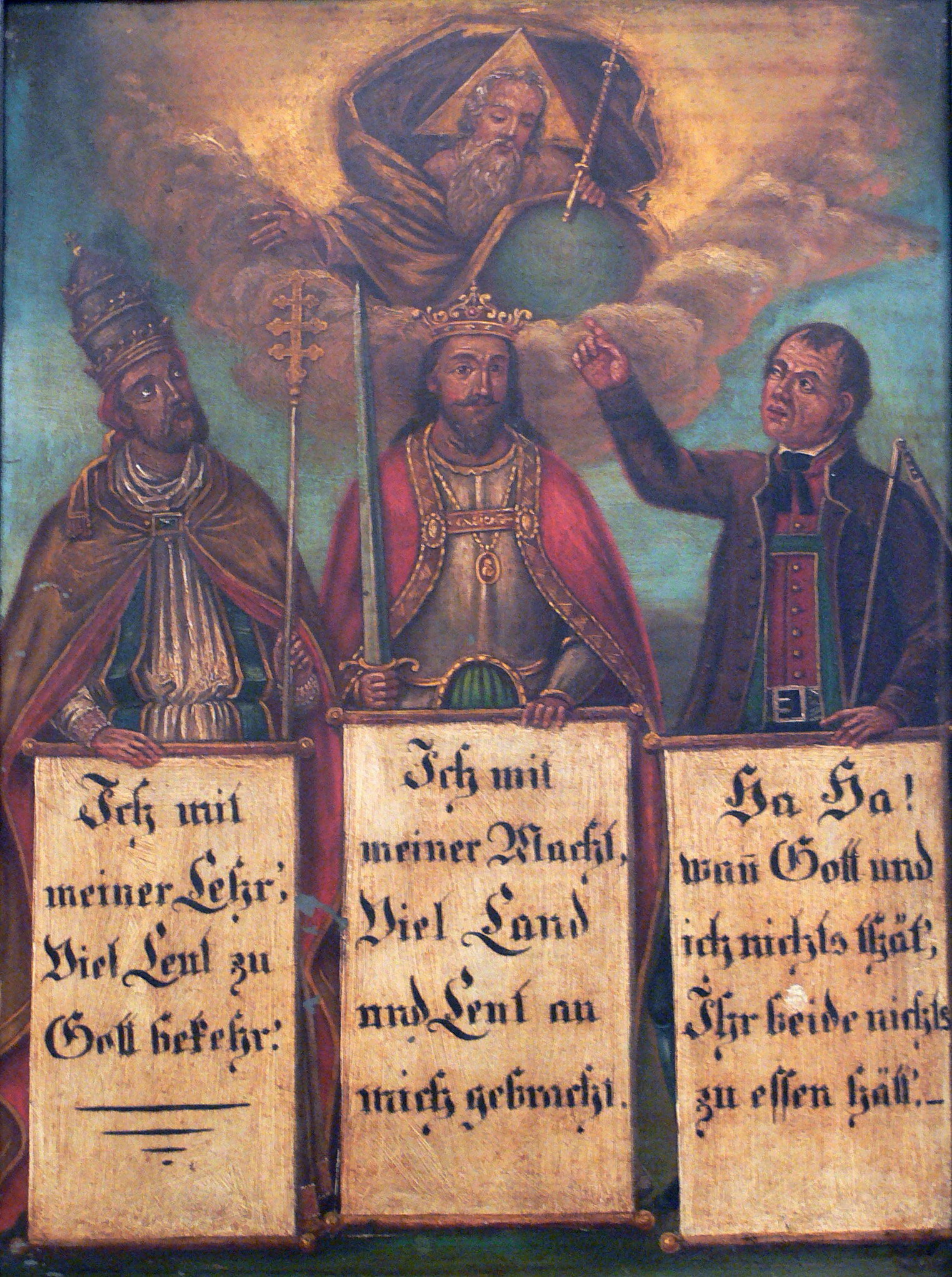
Image of the Three Estates under the Trinity in heaven (Tyrol, 1800)

The Holy Roman Empire had the Imperial Diet (Reichstag). The clergy was represented by the independent prince-bishops, prince-archbishops and prince-abbots of the many monasteries. The nobility consisted of independent aristocratic rulers: secular prince-electors, kings, dukes, margraves, counts and others. Burghers consisted of representatives of the independent imperial cities. Many peoples whose territories within the Holy Roman Empire had been independent for centuries had no representatives in the Imperial Diet, and this included the Imperial Knights and independent villages. The power of the Imperial Diet was limited, despite efforts of centralization.

Large realms of the nobility or clergy had estates of their own that could wield great power in local affairs. Power struggles between ruler and estates were comparable to similar events in the history of the British and French parliaments.

The Swabian League, a significant regional power in its part of Germany during the 15th Century, also had its own kind of Estates, a governing Federal Council comprising three Colleges: those of Princes, Cities, and Knights.

== Russian Empire ==
In the late Russian Empire, the estates were called sosloviyes. The four major estates were: nobility (dvoryanstvo), clergy, rural dwellers, and urban dwellers, with a more detailed stratification therein. The division in estates was of mixed nature: traditional, occupational, as well as formal: for example, voting in Duma was carried out by estates. Russian Empire Census recorded the reported estate of a person.

== Kingdom of Portugal ==
In the Medieval Kingdom of Portugal, the "Cortes" was an assembly of representatives of the estates of the realm – the nobility, clergy and bourgeoisie. It was called and dismissed by the King of Portugal at will, at a place of his choosing. Cortes which brought all three estates together are sometimes distinguished as "Cortes-Gerais" (General Courts), in contrast to smaller assemblies which brought only one or two estates, to negotiate a specific point relevant only to them.

== Principality of Catalonia ==
The Parliament of Catalonia was legally established in 1283 as the General Court of Catalonia (Catalan: Cort General de Catalunya), according to American historian Thomas Bisson, and it has been considered by several historians as a model of medieval parliament. For instance, English historian of constitutionalism Charles Howard McIlwain wrote that the General Court of Catalonia, during the 14th century, had a more defined organization and met more regularly than the parliaments of England or France.

The roots of the parliament institution in Catalonia are in the Peace and Truce Assemblies (assemblees de pau i treva) that started in the 11th century. The members of the General Court of Catalonia were organized in the Three Estates (Catalan: Tres Estats or Tres Braços):

- the "military estate" (braç militars) with representatives of the feudal nobility
- the "ecclesiastical estate" (braç eclesiàstic) with representatives of the religious hierarchy
- the "royal estate" (braç reial or braç popular) with representatives of the free municipalities under royal privilege

The parliamentary institution was abolished in 1716, together with the rest of institutions of the Principality of Catalonia, after the War of the Spanish Succession.

== See also ==
- Churches Militant, Penitent, and Triumphant
- Communalism before 1800
- Four occupations (Asian equivalents)
- Fourth Estate
- Fifth Estate
- Sphere sovereignty
- Trifunctional hypothesis
- Varna (Hinduism)
- What Is the Third Estate?

=== Location-specific ===
- Prussian estates
- Estates of the Netherlands Antilles
- Estates of Brittany
- The Canterbury Tales (the division of society into three estates is one of the key themes)
- A Satire of the Three Estates

=== General ===
- Honorary males
- Social class
- Caste
