= National Judicial Council =

National Judicial Council may refer to:

- National Judicial Council (Croatia)
- National Judicial Council (Nigeria)

== See also ==
- Council of the judiciary
- Judicial Council (disambiguation)
- Judiciary committee (disambiguation)
