= Judiciary committee =

A judiciary committee is a committee of a legislative body that considers issues related to the legal system. It may refer to:

- United States House Committee on the Judiciary, a standing committee of the United States House of Representatives
- United States Senate Committee on the Judiciary, a standing committee of the United States Senate

== See also ==
- Council of the judiciary
- Judicial Council (disambiguation)
- National Judicial Council (disambiguation)
