= Judiciary of California =

Overview of Californian court system

The Judiciary of California or the Judicial Branch of California is defined under the California Constitution as holding the judicial power of the state of California which is vested in the Supreme Court, the Courts of Appeal and the Superior Courts. The judiciary has a hierarchical structure with the California Supreme Court at the top, California Courts of Appeal as the primary appellate courts, and the California Superior Courts as the primary trial courts.

The policymaking body of the California courts is the Judicial Council and its staff.

The judicial system of California is the largest in the United States that is fully staffed by professional law-trained judges. In fiscal year 2020-21, the state judiciary's 2,000 judicial officers and 18,000 judicial branch employees processed approximately 4.4 million cases. In comparison, the federal judicial system has only about 870 judges. Although New York and Texas each technically have more judicial officers than California, most of them are not attorneys and have no formal legal training.

== Courts ==
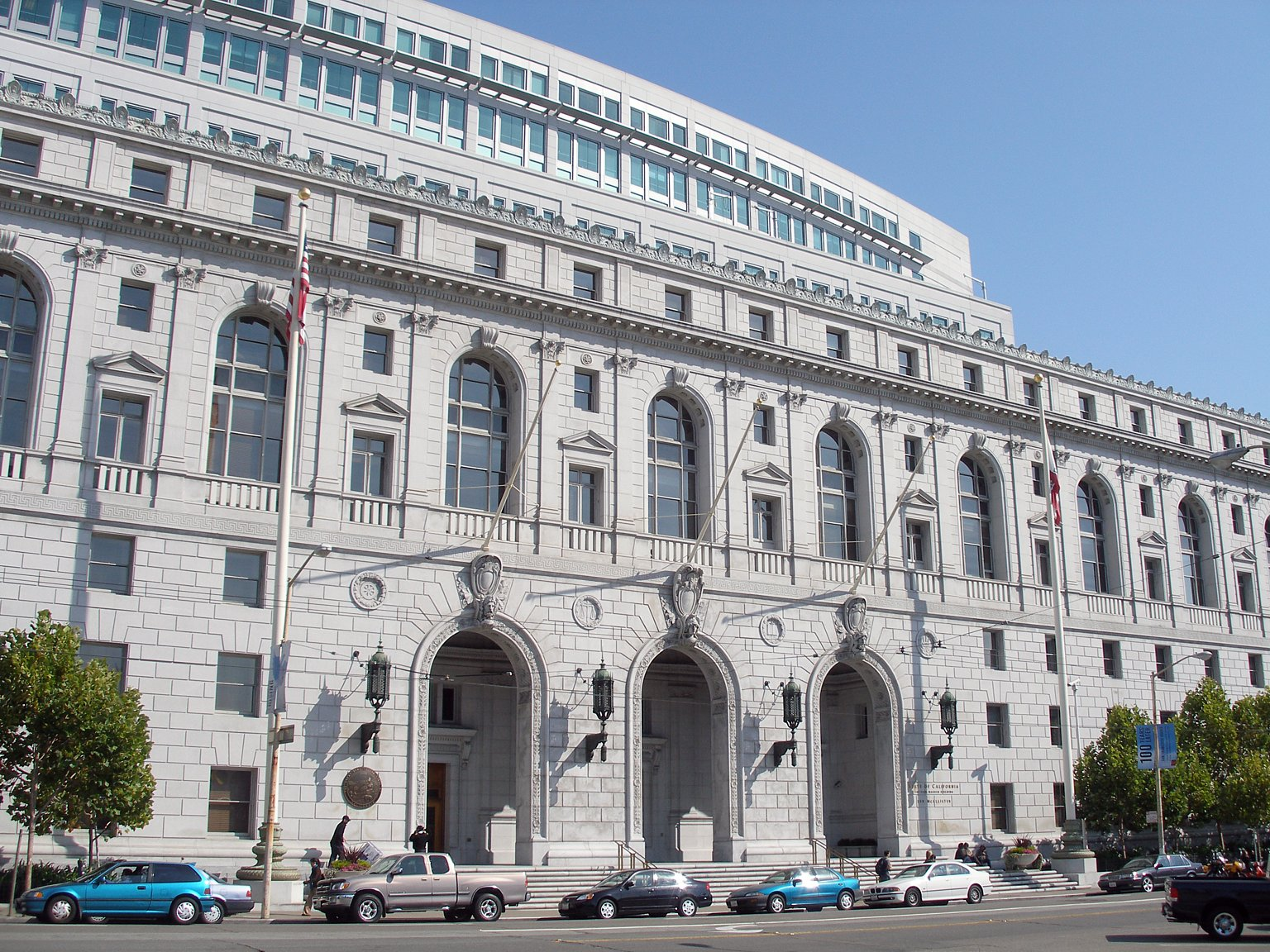
The Earl Warren Building is the headquarters of the Supreme Court of California in San Francisco

The judiciary has a hierarchical structure with the Supreme Court at the apex, courts of appeal as the primary appellate courts, and the superior courts as the primary trial courts.

=== Supreme Court ===
The Supreme Court of California is headquartered in San Francisco, with branch offices in Los Angeles and Sacramento. It hears oral arguments each year in all three locations. It consists of the Chief Justice of California and six Associate Justices.

The Court has original jurisdiction in a variety of cases, including habeas corpus proceedings, and has the authority to review all the decisions of the California courts of appeal, as well as an automatic appeal for cases where the death penalty has been issued by the trial court.

The Court deals with about 8,800 cases per year, although review is discretionary in most cases, and it dismisses the vast majority of petitions without comment. It hears arguments and drafts full opinions for about 100 to 120 cases each year, of which about 20 are automatic death penalty appeals.

The Court also supervises California lawyers through the State Bar Court of California.

=== Courts of appeal ===
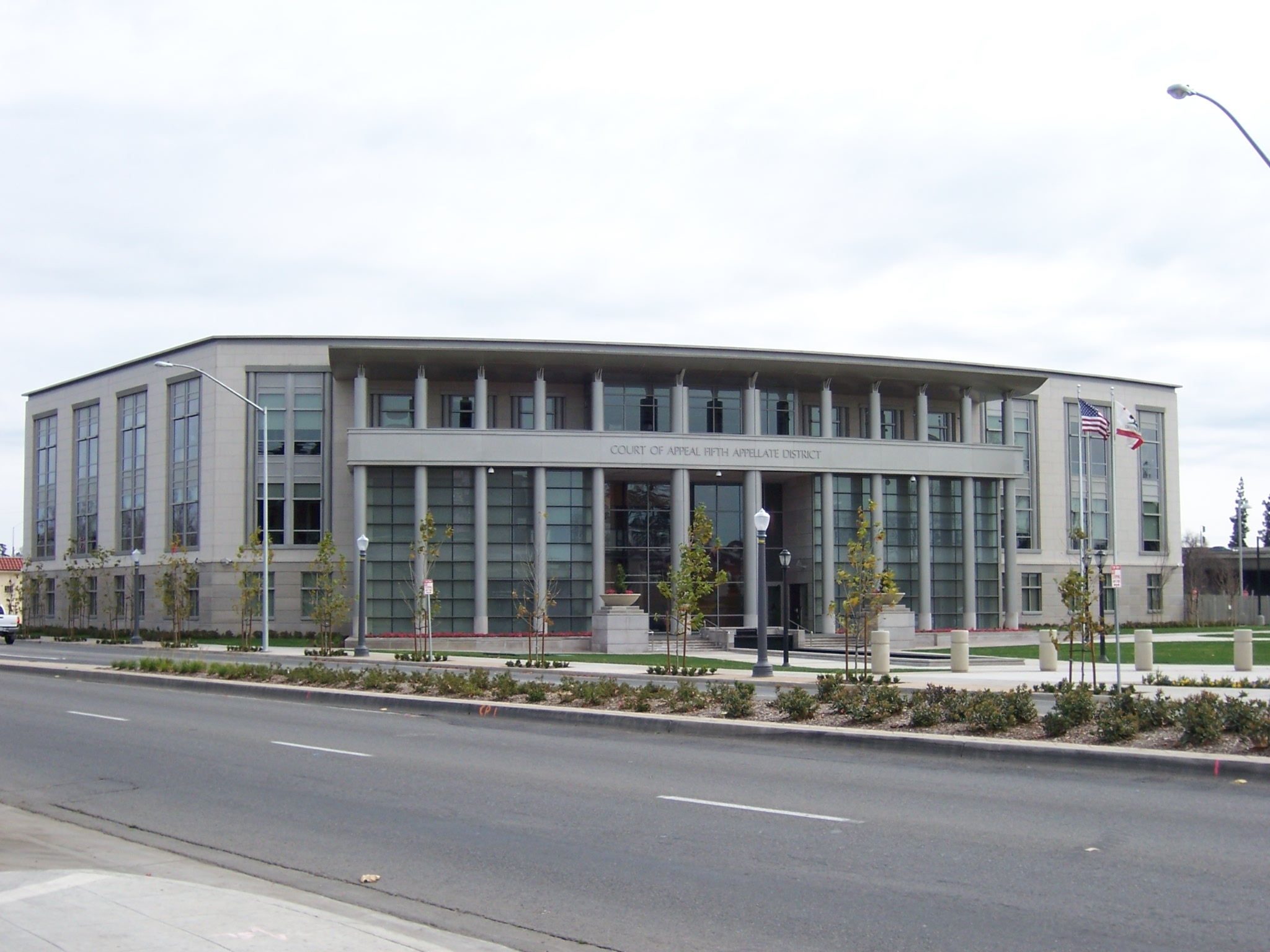
Fresno headquarters of the California courts of appeal for the Fifth District

The California courts of appeal are the intermediate appellate courts. The state is geographically divided into six appellate districts, Notably, all published California appellate decisions are binding on all superior courts, regardless of appellate district. The First Appellate District sits in San Francisco, the Second District in Los Angeles, the Third District in Sacramento, the Fourth District in San Diego, the Fifth District in Fresno, and the Sixth District in San Jose. The districts are further divided into 19 divisions sitting throughout the state at 9 locations, and there are 105 justices serving on the Courts.

Unlike the state supreme court, the courts of appeal have mandatory review jurisdiction under the informal legal tradition in common law countries that all litigants are entitled to at least one appeal. In practice, this works out to about 16,000 appeals per year, resulting in 12,000 opinions (not all appeals are pursued properly or are meritorious enough to justify an opinion).

Under the common law, judicial opinions themselves have legal effect through the rule of stare decisis. But because of their crushing caseloads (about 200 matters per justice per year), the courts of appeal are permitted to take the shortcut of selecting only the best opinions for publication. This way, they can draft opinions fast and quickly dispose of the vast majority of cases, without worrying that they are accidentally making bad law. About 7% of their opinions are ultimately selected for publication and become part of California law.

In California, the power of the intermediate courts of appeal over the superior courts is quite different from the power of the courts of appeals of the federal government over the federal district courts. The first Court of Appeal to rule on a new legal issue will bind all lower superior courts statewide. However, litigants in other appellate districts may still appeal a superior court's adverse ruling to their own Court of Appeal, which has the power to fashion a different rule. When such a conflict arises, all superior courts have the discretion to choose which rule they like until the California Supreme Court grants review and creates a single rule that binds all courts statewide. However, where a superior court lies within one of the appellate districts actually involved in such a conflict, it will usually follow the rule of its own Court of Appeal.

=== Superior Courts ===
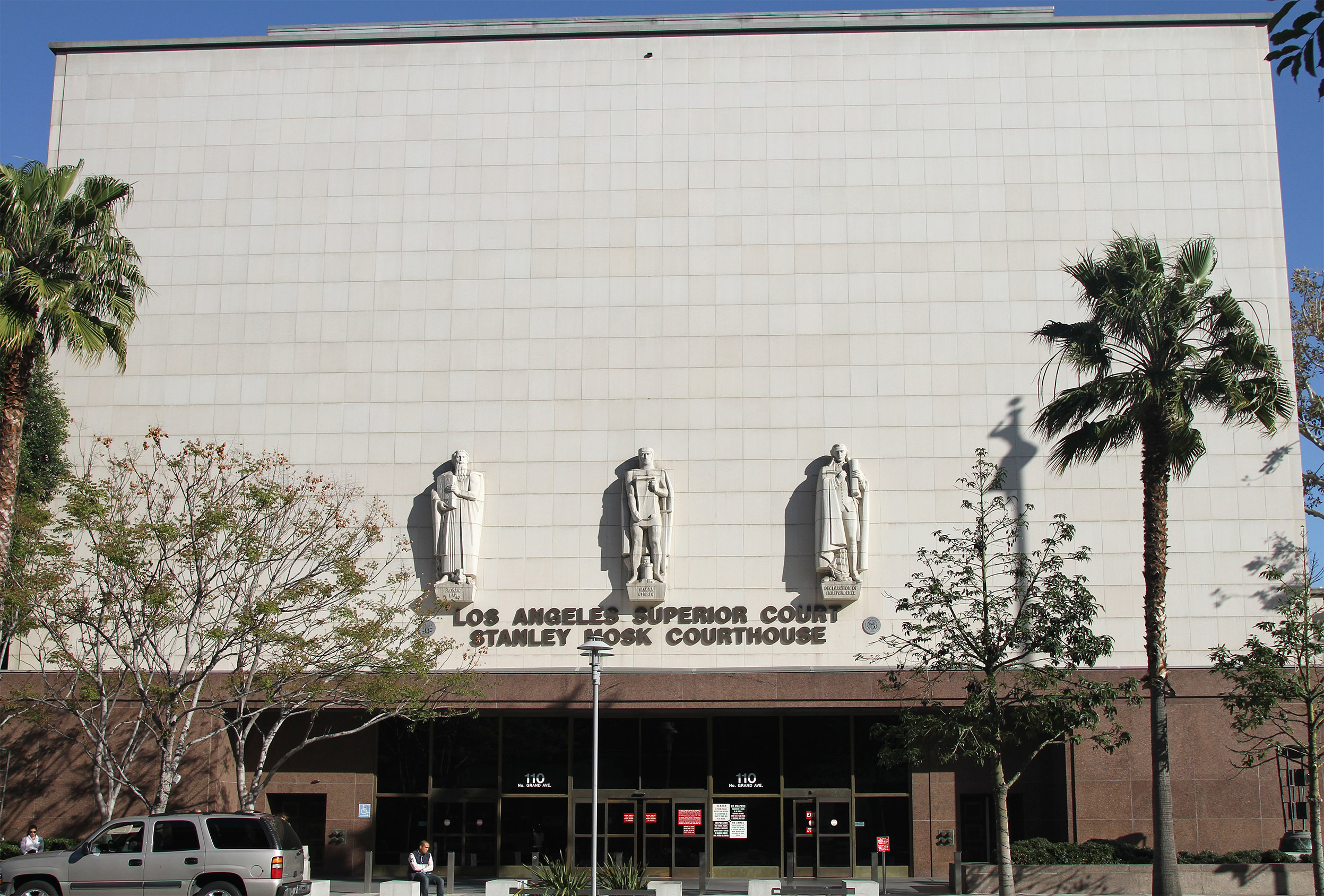
The Stanley Mosk Courthouse of the Los Angeles County Superior Court

The California Superior Courts are the superior courts with the general jurisdiction to hear and decide any civil or criminal action which is not specially designated to be heard in some other court or before a governmental agency, such as workers' compensation. As mandated by the California Constitution, each of the 58 counties in California has a superior court with one or more judges.

==== Appellate divisions ====
The superior courts have appellate divisions (superior court judges sitting as appellate judges) which hear appeals from decisions of other superior court judges (or commissioners, or judges pro tem) who heard and decided relatively minor cases that previously would have been heard in inferior courts, such as infractions, misdemeanors, and "limited civil" actions (actions where the amount in controversy is below $25,000).

== Administration ==
The Judicial Council of California is the rule-making arm of the judiciary of California. Pursuant to this role, they have adopted the California Rules of Court as their regulations. The Judicial Council's staff is responsible for implementing council policies. In addition, every court may make local rules for its own government and the government of its officers.

Pursuant to common law tradition, the courts of California have developed a large body of case law through the decisions of the Supreme Court and the courts of appeal, which are published by the California Reporter of Decisions in the California Reports and California Appellate Reports, respectively. The appellate divisions of the superior courts occasionally certify opinions for publication, which appear in the California Appellate Reports Supplement. There is also a separate reporter called the California Unreported Cases published independently starting in 1913 containing minor opinions that should have been published but simply were not, when the state supreme court was extremely overloaded with cases during its first half-century (resulting in the creation of the courts of appeal in 1904).

=== California Court Case Management System ===
Court business is conducted using the California Court Case Management System and other local court implementations.

In 2002, the California Administrative Office of the Courts (AOC) started the Second-Generation Electronic Filing Specification (2GEFS) project. After a $200,000 consultant's report declared the project ready for a final push, the Judicial Council of California scrapped the program in 2012 after $500 million in costs. The 2GEFS Court Filing 2.0 specification was based on experiences with the Legal XML Court Filing 1.0 (before it became OASIS Legal XML). On December 10, 2012, it was announced that the San Luis Obispo County Superior Court would use the Odyssey court case management system from Tyler Technologies.

As of 2014, five Superior Courts—in Orange, Sacramento, San Diego, San Joaquin, and Ventura Counties—use CCMS version 3 to process civil cases. This represents approximately 25 percent of the civil case volume in California. Fresno is the only Superior Court still using version 2 of CCMS. In August 2013, the Judicial Council approved funding for a system that will replace CCMS version 2 in Fresno.

Pursuant to California Rule of Court 2.506 and Government Code Section 68150(h), courts may impose fees for the costs of providing access to its electronic records.

Several superior courts do so, including Alameda, Los Angeles, Riverside, Sacramento, and San Diego, and the fees have been criticized by Thomas Peele as exorbitant and extraordinarily high, with the Alameda County Superior Court fees being the subject of a MoveOn.org petition.

== Personnel ==
=== Judges ===
==== Judicial Selection Process ====
California uses a modified Missouri Plan (merit plan) method of appointing judges, in which the Governor's office conducts an investigation of applicants in order to submit a list of potential applicants to the Judicial Nominees Evaluation Commission for a formal vetting process that is not made public. A detailed report is submitted to the governor. The governor makes his nominations and sends his nominees to be reviewed by the Commission on Judicial Appointments which may confirm the nominee at which point they are officially appointed to the bench for a 12 year term.

Justices are elected for 12 year terms at the same time as the Governor. When a judge's term is expiring another judge from a different court can file a declaration of candidacy to succeed to the office presently held by the judge.

Most of California's roughly 1,600 superior court judges are first appointed by the governor of California. A person is eligible to be a judge only if the person has been a member of the California State Bar or served as a judge of a court of record in this State for 10 years immediately preceding selection.

==== California Commission on Judicial Appointments ====
Supreme Court and Appeals Court judges appointed by the governor to fill a vacancy must be confirmed by the California Commission on Judicial Appointments, although counties may choose to use this system for superior court judges. The California Commission on Judicial Appointments consists of the Chief Justice, Attorney General, and Senior Presiding Justice of the Court of Appeal of the affected district or of the entire state. Superior court judges are either appointed by the governor to fill a vacancy after being reviewed by the JNE or elected by the county residents in nonpartisan elections. Judges of superior courts are elected within their counties for six years, judges of courts of appeal are elected within their districts for twelve years, and judges of the Supreme Court are elected at large for twelve years. Judges are always subject to reelection and retention elections. Perhaps the most well known instance of a judge not being retained was Supreme Court Chief Justice Rose Bird and Associate Justices Cruz Reynoso and Joseph Grodin in the 1986 California general election.

==== California Commission on Judicial Nominees Evaluation ====
The California Commission on Judicial Nominees Evaluation (JNE) of the State Bar of California investigates the governor's candidates for judicial appointment.

==== California Commission on Judicial Performance ====
The California Commission on Judicial Performance is responsible for investigating complaints of judicial misconduct, judicial incapacity, and disciplining state judges, and is composed of 11 members, each appointed four-year terms: 3 judges appointed by the California Supreme Court, 4 members appointed by the governor (2 attorneys and 2 non-attorney public members), 2 public members appointed by the Assembly Speaker, and 2 public members appointed by the Senate Rules Committee.

There are a total of about 1,500 superior court judges, assisted by 380 commissioners and 35 referees.

=== Jurors ===
The Constitution guarantees the right to a jury trial as an inviolate right. Jury service is an obligation of citizenship.

Jurors are selected at random from the population of the area served by a court, from a source or sources inclusive of a representative cross section of the population. Sources may include the list of registered voters, California Department of Motor Vehicles' list of licensed drivers and identification cardholders resident within the area served by the court, customer mailing lists, telephone directories, utility company lists, and other lists.

Jury commissioners manage the jury systems, and are appointed by, and serve at the pleasure of, a majority of the judges of the superior court in each county. The superior court administrator or executive officer serves as ex officio jury commissioner.

=== Subordinate judicial officers ===
The California Constitution provides that the state's judicial power is vested in the courts, but it also permits some delegation of judicial authority. This authority to delegate subordinate judicial duties is distinct from the courts' authority to appoint temporary judges, which requires a stipulation by the parties. Three types of SJOs have statutory authority in criminal cases: court commissioners, traffic trial commissioners, and traffic referees. There are small differences in the authority of these SJO types, but in almost all instances one type can be cross-assigned to exercise the authority of another type. They are elected by the judges of the Court and given the power to hear and make decisions in certain kinds of legal matters, similar to the United States magistrate judge.

=== Prosecutors ===
The (county) district attorney prosecutes crimes before the courts on behalf of California. Violation of city ordinances may be prosecuted by city authorities. Violation of county ordinances may be prosecuted by county authorities, which may or may not be the responsibility of the district attorney. The California Attorney General is the chief law officer of the State, has direct supervision over every district attorney and sheriff, may prosecute any violations of law with all the powers of a district attorney, and may assist any district attorney in their duties.

=== Attorneys ===
The State Bar of California is California's official bar association. It is responsible for managing the admission of lawyers to the practice of law, investigating complaints of professional misconduct, and prescribing appropriate discipline. It is directly responsible to the Supreme Court of California. All attorney admissions and disbarments are issued as recommendations of the State Bar, which are then routinely ratified by the Supreme Court. California's bar is the largest in the U.S. with 200,000 members, of whom 150,000 are actively practicing.

=== Public defenders ===
The county public defender acts as defense counsel for indigent defendants.

=== Probation officers ===
Each county has the offices of probation officer, assistant probation officer, and deputy probation officer. Probation officers in each county appointed by the judge of the juvenile court upon nomination by the juvenile justice commission or regional juvenile justice commission of such county. Probation officers may be removed by the judge of the juvenile court for good cause shown or in his discretion with the written approval of a majority of the members of the juvenile justice commission.

=== Clerks ===
The court clerks are responsible for clerical courtroom activities, interacting with the attorneys and the public, administering oaths, assisting with the impaneling juries, and are responsible for the inventory and safe-keeping of the exhibits.

=== Bailiffs ===
The functions of the bailiff are usually carried out by the county sheriff under contract, but Shasta County, and Trinity County still maintain a separate marshal.

== Analysis and criticism ==
The election of judges, as well as the costs of running for office, have been criticized. Median spending for a judicial office of the Los Angeles County Superior Court has risen from $3,177 in 1970 to $70,000 in 1994.

Fresno County public defenders have protested excessive case loads, carrying about 1,000 felony cases a year giving them an average of only about two hours and five minutes per case.

== History ==
California formerly had "justice of the peace" courts staffed by lay judges, but gradually phased them out after a landmark 1974 decision in which the Supreme Court of California unanimously held that it was a violation of due process to allow a non-lawyer to preside over a criminal trial which could result in incarceration of the defendant.

Before 1998, each county also had municipal or justice courts that heard some of the cases. In June, 1998, California passed Proposition 220, which allowed the judges in each county to determine if the county should have only one trial court. By 2001, all 58 counties had consolidated their courts into a single superior court.

The California courts of appeal were added to the judicial branch by a constitutional amendment in 1904.

== See also ==
- Government of California
- Law of California
- Law enforcement in California
- the State Bar Court, an administrative court of the State Bar
