= Court of Revision (Monaco) =

Highest judicial court in Monaco

The Court of Revision (French: Cour de révision) is the highest judicial court in the Principality of Monaco. The Court rules on all matters concerning violation of the law, and on appeals against any last resort decision or final judgment of the court. The jurisdiction of the Court of Revision is regulated by Article 25 of the Law no 783 July 15, 1965 from 15 July 1965 on judicial organization. By statute, the Court of Revision consists of seven judges: a President, a Vice-President and five advisors. The Court of Revision is a member of the Francophone Association of High Courts of Cassation (AHJUCAF). As of 2021 the president of the Court of Revision is Cécile Chatel Petit, Honorary First Advocate General at the First Civil Chamber of the French Court of Cassation, former member of the Superior Council of the French Magistracy.
