= Laurent Anselmi =

Monégasque politician (born 1962)

- Born: 1962 (age 63–64)
- Occupation: Politician

Laurent Anselmi (born 1962) is a Monégasque politician in Monte Carlo.

== Politics in Monaco ==
As of 21 October 2019, he served as Minister of Foreign Affairs and Cooperation. He became Chief of Staff for Prince Albert II of Monaco as of January 2022.

== Biography ==
After completing his schooling in Monaco, graduating from the Lycée Albert Premier with a Baccalauréat, Laurent Anselmi joined the Faculty of Law and Economics in Nice. There, he obtained first a bachelor's degree and then a master's degree in law (with honors), as well as a Diplôme d'Etudes Approfondies (D.E.A.) in fundamental public law. He is the author of a dissertation entitled "Le contentieux du permis de construire devant le Tribunal Administratif de Nice" ("Building permit litigation before the Nice Administrative Court"), directed by Professor Hubert Charles.

He holds a Certificat universitaire d'études fédéralistes (1983) from the Centre international de formation européenne (C.I.F.E.) in Aosta, Italy.

On completion of his D.E.A., Laurent Anselmi was appointed lecturer in his faculty (public law and political science) and territorial attaché in the legal department of Nice town council.

In 1989, he joined the administration of the Principality of Monaco, as a legal assistant in the Department of Litigation and Legislative Studies, a department reporting directly to the Minister of State.

As soon as he took office, H.S.H. Prince Albert II called on him to join his Cabinet as an advisor. His responsibilities included judicial, international and social affairs. In 2008, he returned to the Ministry of State to take over the Legal Affairs Department, with the title of Delegate for Legal Affairs to the Government of Monaco.

Anselmi has been appointed head of the Monaco's Sea Academy in 2024.

== Other roles ==
Besides these official ranks, Anselmi is also:

- President of the Monégasque Language Commission
- General secretary of the Chancellery of the Order of Saint-Charles
- Member of the Ethics Committee of the Prince Albert II Foundation

== Distinctions ==
- Commandeur de l’Ordre Saint Charles (Monaco)
- Grande ufficiale del'Ordine della Stella d'Italia
