= National Courts Administration =

National Courts Administration may refer to:

- Norwegian National Courts Administration
- Swedish National Courts Administration
