= Judicial council (United States) =

Circuit judicial councils are panels of the United States federal courts that are charged with making "necessary and appropriate orders for the effective and expeditious administration of justice" within their circuits. Among their responsibilities is judicial discipline, the formulation of circuit policy, the implementation of policy directives received from the Judicial Conference of the United States, and the annual submission of a report to the Administrative Office of the United States Courts on the number and nature of orders entered during the year that relate to judicial misconduct. Each US judicial circuit has a judicial council, which consists of the chief judge of the circuit and an equal number of circuit judges and district judges of the circuit.

== Judicial discipline ==
The judicial discipline process of US federal judges is initiated by the filing of a complaint by any person alleging that a judge has engaged in conduct "prejudicial to the effective and expeditious administration of the business of the courts, or alleging that such judge is unable to discharge all the duties of the office by reason of mental or physical disability." The chief judge of the circuit has the power to dismiss or conclude the proceeding, or appoint a special committee to investigate the facts and allegations in the complaint. The committee is composed of the chief judge and an equal number of circuit judges and district judges, whom are appointed by the chief judge. The committee must conduct such investigation as it finds necessary and then expeditiously file a comprehensive written report of its investigation with the judicial council of the circuit involved. Upon receipt of such a report, the judicial council of the circuit involved may conduct any additional investigation it deems necessary, and it may dismiss the complaint.

If a judge who is the subject of a complaint holds his or her office during good behavior, action taken by the judicial council may include certifying disability of the judge. The judicial council may also, in its discretion, refer any complaint under 28 U.S.C. § 351, along with the record of any associated proceedings and its recommendations for appropriate action, to the Judicial Conference. The Judicial Conference may exercise its authority under the judicial discipline provisions as a conference, or through a standing committee appointed by the Chief Justice.

== See also ==
- New York State Commission on Judicial Conduct
- Judicial Council of California
- Judicial Councils Reform and Judicial Conduct and Disability Act of 1980
- Judicial Council (disambiguation page)
