= Judicial Council of California =

Judicial Council
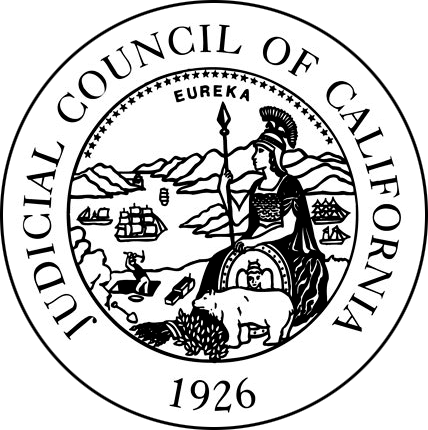
- Seal

Council overview
- Formed: November 3, 1926
- Jurisdiction: California
- Headquarters: Hiram W. Johnson State Office Building, San Francisco
- Motto: Ensuring the consistent, independent, impartial, and accessible administration of justice
- Council executives: Patricia Guerrero, chair; Millicent Tidwell, acting administrative director
- Key document: Constitution of California
- Website: www.courts.ca.gov/policyadmin-jc.htm

The Judicial Council of California is the rule-making arm of the California court system. In accordance with the California Constitution and under the leadership of the Chief Justice of the Supreme Court of California, the council is responsible for "ensuring the consistent, independent, impartial, and accessible administration of justice." It was created by an amendment to article VI of the California Constitution in 1926.

== Rules ==
The California Rules of Court are rules adopted by the Judicial Council. Every court may also make local rules for its own government and the government of its officers not inconsistent with law or with the rules adopted and prescribed by the Judicial Council.

California law encourages the Judicial Council to provide for uniformity in rules and procedures throughout all courts on the form of papers, limitations on the filing of papers, rules relating to law and motion, and requirements concerning documents to be filed at or prior to trial. One of the Judicial Council's most well-known functions is promulgating a huge number of standard court forms for use in California judicial proceedings, such as Form TR-130, the standard "Notice to Appear" form used by practically all California law enforcement agencies to write traffic citations.

== Composition ==
The Judicial Council is composed of 21 voting members:

- The Chief Justice
- 14 judicial officers appointed by the Chief Justice (1 associate justice of the Supreme Court, 3 justices of the Courts of Appeal, 10 trial court judges)
- 4 attorney members appointed by the State Bar Board of Trustees
- 1 member from each house of the Legislature

The California Constitution requires that the council also have two non-voting members who are court administrators. The Administrative Director is a non-voting member who serves as Secretary, and the Chief Justice can also appoint further advisory (non-voting) members.

== Staff ==
The Judicial Council's staff of approximately 800 is responsible for implementing council policies and supporting the day-to-day operations of the Supreme Court, the courts of appeal, and the superior courts. The staff maintains a headquarters office in San Francisco where the Judicial Council regularly meets, as well as a branch in Sacramento. The staff has also created a centralized datacenter for the court system, the California Court Technology Center, which is operated under contract by Siemens IT Solutions and Services in Newark.

== See also ==
- California Court Case Management System
- Judiciary of California
- Judicial Conference of the United States
- Council of the judiciary (for similar bodies in other jurisdictions)
- Judicial Council (disambiguation page)
