= New York State Commission on Judicial Conduct =

State Commission on Judicial Conduct
Commission overview
- Jurisdiction: New York
- Commission executives: Joseph W. Belluck, chair; Robert H. Tembeckjian, administrator
- Key documents: New York Constitution; Judiciary Law
- Website: cjc.ny.gov

The New York State Commission on Judicial Conduct is an eleven-member panel with authority to discipline judges of the New York courts. The Commission is constitutionally established to investigate and prosecute complaints filed against New York judges.

== Procedure ==
The commission receives complaints, investigates and makes initial determinations regarding judicial conduct. The Commission may privately caution or publicly admonish, censure a judge, remove from office, or mandatorily retire a judge found guilty of misconduct. The Commission's decisions are subject to review by the New York Court of Appeals, upon a judge's request, which may confirm or reject the Commission's findings of misconduct, and reduce or increase a recommended sanction.

The rules and regulations of the commission are compiled in Title 22, Subtitle C, Chapter V of the New York Codes, Rules and Regulations (NYCRR), whereas the rules concerning review by the Court of Appeals are compiled in Title 22, Subtitle B, Chapter I, Subchapter D of the NYCRR.

== Composition ==
Commission members are judges, lawyers and non-lawyers appointed by the Governor, the Chief Judge, and leaders of the New York State Legislature.

Commission Members	Appointed By	First Appointed	Current Term
Joseph W. Belluck, Esq., Chair	Governor Kathy Hochul	2008	2024-2028
Taa Grays, Esq., Vice Chair	Senate President Pro Tem Andrea Stewart-Cousins	2017	2023-2027
Hon. Fernando M. Camacho	Chief Judge Rowan D. Wilson	2021	2024-2028
Stefano Cambareri, Esq.	Assembly Minority Leader William A. Barclay	2024	2025-2029
Brian C. Doyle, Esq.	Senate Minority Leader Robert G. Ortt	2023	2024-2028
Hon. John A. Falk	Chief Judge Rowan D. Wilson	2017	2024-2028
Hon. David Fried	Governor Kathy Hochul	2026	2026-2030
Robin Chappelle Golston	Governor Kathy Hochul	2025	2025–2029
Dr. Nina M. Moore	Governor Kathy Hochul	2023	2023–2027
Hon. Peter H. Moulton	Chief Judge Rowan D. Wilson	2025	2026–2030
Marvin Ray Raskin, Esq.	Assembly Speaker Carl Heastie	2018	2026–2030

== See also ==
- Judicial council (United States)
