= Fourth branch of government =

Concept in U.S. politics

In politics of the United States, "fourth branch of government" is an unofficial term referring to groups or institutions perceived variously as influencing or acting in the stead of the three branches of the US federal government defined in the Constitution of the United States (legislative, executive and judicial). Views as to whether the influence is due or undue or the actions are for good or ill also vary.

Such groups can include the press (akin to the European 'Fourth Estate'), the people (in sum or as grand juries), and interest groups. The independent administrative agencies of the United States government, while technically part of any one of the three branches, may also be referred to as a 'fourth branch'.

== Fourth Constitutional Organ ==
Most nations with a separation of powers use a three branch system (legislative, executive, judicial). A small group of nations have or had institutions that are akin to a genuine fourth branch. These are typically constitutional councils or similar entities. They include the following: the Control Yuan of Taiwan, The Constitutional Council of France, The Assembly of Experts of Iran, and the historical Council of Censors in Pennsylvania and Vermont.

== The press ==
While the term 'fourth estate' is used to emphasize the independence of 'the press', the fourth branch suggests that the press is not independent of the government. The concept of the news media or press as a fourth branch stems from a belief that the media's responsibility to inform the populace is essential to the healthy functioning of democracy.

Douglass Cater, in his 1959 The Fourth Branch of Government offered the hypothesis that the press had become "a de facto, quasiofficial fourth branch of government" and observed it was the looseness of the American political framework that allowed news media to “insert themselves as another branch of the government”. Cater was "convinced that, insofar as the press did act as a true political player (rather than an unbiased observer of politics), it corrupted itself and went astray from its primary responsibility—to convey important information and to act as a nonpartisan watchdog for the public against all trespassers on their rights." (Note: For more on Douglass Cater, including recognition of his ‘evenhandedness’, see his obituary.) (Note: Herbert Brücker, in his 1949 book, Freedom of Information on "the practical relationship between the government and the press" equated the terms '4th estate' and '4th branch of government', but held the same position as Cater regarding corruption of the press when it acted as a political player.)

In 1985, Walter Annenberg noted that several commentators were applying the term 'fourth branch of government' to the press to indicate that it has at least as much if not more power to direct public policy than do the other three branches, in part because of its direct contact with the public and its protection "by the First Amendment from responsibility for what they report".

== The people ==
Justice Antonin Scalia's majority opinion in United States v. Williams, 1992 has been relied on to refer to grand juries as a fourth branch of government. In that opinion, Scalia wrote:

[T]he grand jury is mentioned in the Bill of Rights, but not in the body of the Constitution. It has not been textually assigned, therefore, to any of the branches described in the first three Articles. It 'is a constitutional fixture in its own right' [case cites]. In fact the whole theory of its function is that it belongs to no branch of the institutional government, serving as a kind of buffer or referee between the Government and the people.

Some have used this to call for common law grand juries "to expose fraud and corruption whether it is in the judicial or political realm."

Others have used the term in calls to, e.g., "empower the people" by petition or referendum processes or, similarly, for "broader and more direct participation in our governance" by eliminating the Electoral College, implementing e-voting and other measures.

== Interest groups ==
In an article titled "The 'Fourth Branch' of Government", Alex Knott of the Center for Public Integrity asserted in 2005 that "special interests and the lobbyists they employ have reported spending, since 1998, a total of almost $13 billion to influence Congress, the White House and more than 200 federal agencies."

== Administrative agencies ==
The administrative agencies that are funded from public money may exercise powers granted by Congress. Without appropriate controls and oversight this practice may result in a bureaucracy (in the original literal sense). Some critics have argued that a central paradox at the heart of the American political system is democracy's reliance on what the critics view as undemocratic bureaucratic institutions that characterize the administrative agencies of government.

An argument made for calling administrative agencies a "fourth branch" of government is the fact that such agencies typically exercise all three constitutionally divided powers within a single bureaucratic body: That is, agencies legislate (a power vested solely in the legislature by the Constitution) through delegated rulemaking authority; investigate, execute, and enforce such rules (via the executive power these agencies are typically organized under); and apply, interpret, and enforce compliance with such rules (a power separately vested in the judicial branch). Additionally, non-executive, or "independent" administrative agencies are often called a fourth branch of government, as they create rules with the effect of law, yet may be composed at least partially of private, non-governmental actors.

The intelligence community have also been referred to as the fourth branch of government by people such as House of Representatives member Ron Dellums, Lloyd Gardner and Tom Engelhardt.

Recent scholarship has argued that judicial councils—bodies overseeing judicial appointments and discipline—may also be understood as fourth-branch institutions, because they exercise governance functions independent from the executive, legislature, and judiciary.

== Closely related concepts ==
Bob Jessop, in his book The State: Past, Present, Future, notes the similarity of three constructs:

1. 'Deep state' – for which he cites Mike Lofgren's 2014 definition: "a hybrid association of elements of government and parts of top-level finance and industry that is effectively able to govern ... without reference to the consent of the governed as expressed through the formal political process".
2. 'Dark state' – "networks of officials, private firms, media outlets, think tanks, foundations, NGOs, interest groups, and other forces that attend to the needs of capital, not of everyday life" while "concealed from public gaze (or 'hidden in plain sight')", citing Jason Lindsay (2013).
3. 'The fourth branch' of US government – consisting of "an ever more unchecked and unaccountable centre ... working behind a veil of secrecy", citing Tom Engelhardt (2014).

Per Engelhardt: "Classically, ... the three branches of government .. were to check and balance one another so that power would never become centralized ... The founding fathers [never envisioned] that a fourth branch of government, the national security state, would arise, dedicated to the centralization of power in an atmosphere of total secrecy. In the post-9/11 years, it has significantly absorbed the other three branches."

== In popular culture ==
- In The Simpsons episode "Sideshow Bob Roberts" (originally aired October 9, 1994), Springfield's leading conservative talk radio host, Birch Barlow (a parody of leading American conservative talk radio host Rush Limbaugh) welcomes listeners to his show by introducing himself as the "fourth branch of government" and the "51st state".
- In 2007, the short-lived ABC drama-thriller Traveler, the fourth branch existed as a secret society created by the Founding Fathers and composed of the oldest families in the United States, whose purpose is to implement checks and balances on the U.S. government to guide the true course of America.
- Rapper and political activist Immortal Technique has a track entitled the "4th branch", in which he applies the role of said branch to the media in a pejorative manner. He implies in this track (or pretty much explicitly states) that corporately owned mass-media outlets of the United States act more like another part of the government instead of as independent entities, and he gives some of his reasons for this belief on the track.

== See also ==
- Deep state
- Fourth estate
- National security state
- Military industrial complex
- Recuperation (politics)
- Shadow government (conspiracy)
- Government of the Republic of China, which has five official branches
