= Legal affairs of the second Trump presidency =

American legal cases for the second Trump presidency since 2025

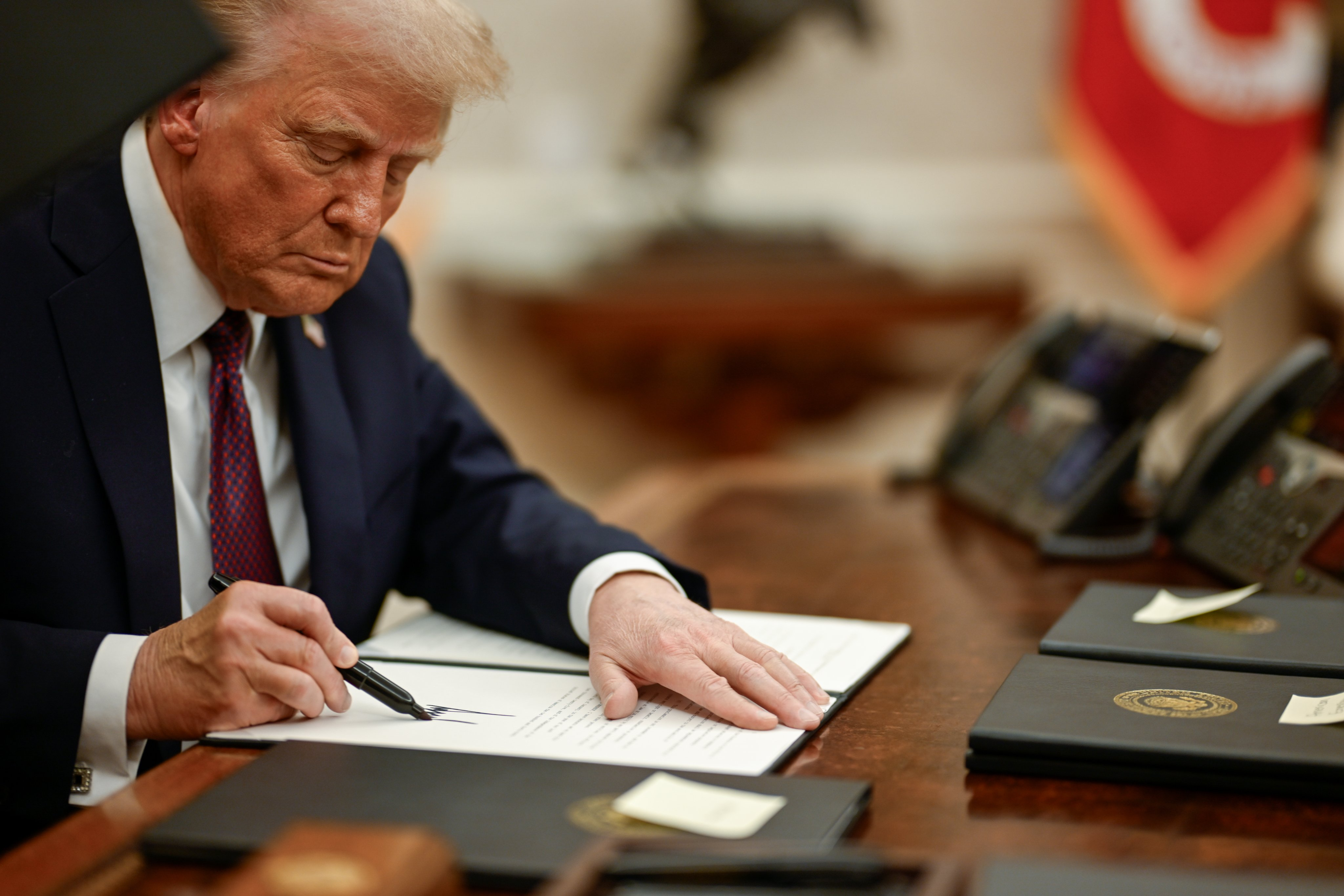
President Donald Trump signing executive orders

At the beginning of Donald Trump's second presidential term, he signed a series of executive orders. Many of these tested his legal authority, and drew immediate legal action. He issued more executive orders on his first day than any previous president. In the administration's first two months, 127 lawsuits were filed against it, according to data from New York University. In his first weeks, several of his actions ignored or violated federal laws, regulations, and the Constitution according to American legal scholars.

Many cases have been brought in response to Executive Order 14158, establishing the Department of Government Efficiency (DOGE). Trump identified billionaire and tech CEO, Elon Musk, as leading DOGE, although he did not hold the office of DOGE Administrator. Musk began federal cost-cutting measures, including layoffs, shutting down departments and agencies, ending aid, and removing programs, such as diversity, equity, and inclusion (DEI) initiatives.

The Trump administration has claimed that they have wide powers to bypass Congressional oversight, while many others believe these actions to be unconstitutional. By mid-July, a Washington Post analysis found he defied judges and the courts in roughly one third of all cases against him, actions which were described by legal experts as unprecedented for any presidential administration. His defiance of court orders and a claimed right to disobey the courts raised fears among legal experts of a constitutional crisis.

Federal judges found many of the administration's actions to be illegal. By August 2025, several grant terminations and spending freezes were found by judges and the Government Accountability Office as being illegal and unconstitutional. His attempt to remove birthright citizenship was called "blatantly unconstitutional" by Reagan-appointed judge John C. Coughenour, and judges have also described other actions to be unconstitutional such as his unprecedented targeting of law firms and lawyers as part of his wider actions targeting political opponents and civil society.

Multiple analyses conducted by academic scholars and The New York Times found that both Republican and Democratic judicial appointees have found numerous constitutional and statutory flaws with Trump administration policies. On June 27, 2025, the U.S. Supreme Court ruled in Trump v. CASA that universal injunctions cannot be issued by a federal district court. Following this decision, preliminary injunction may only provide relief for a plaintiff and may not block the implementation of the orders nationwide.

== Tracking the cases ==
Several organizations are tracking the cases that have been filed against the second Trump administration, including the Associated Press, the Civil Rights Litigation Clearinghouse, Court Watch, Just Security, Lawfare, and The Washington Post. These organizations vary in the number of cases they're tracking, whether and how they group kinds of cases, how much information is provided about each case, whether and how they characterize cases' progress, and whether they link to the case docket. For example, as of January 3, 2026, the Associated Press was tracking 358 cases, grouping them in one of 14 categories (e.g., "Immigration"), describing each with a phrase or sentence, characterizing their progress in one of three ways (i.e., "Partially or fully blocked: 149", "Court left in effect: 102", and "Pending: 107"), and not linking to the case dockets, whereas Just Security was tracking 552 cases, grouping them into more and narrower categories (e.g., "Immigration enforcement against places of worship and schools", "Immigration and citizenship", "Access of lawyers to immigrants in detention"), describing each with one or more paragraphs, characterizing their progress in more and narrower categories (e.g., "Government Action Blocked Pending Appeal: 28", "Case Closed/Dismissed in Favor of Government: 22"), and linking to each case's docket.

Color key

- Ruled in favour of plaintiff
- Ruled in favour of Trump administration
- Preliminary injunction or temporary restraining order granted
- Preliminary injunction or temporary restraining order denied
- Ongoing
- Voluntarily dismissed or dismissed by the court

== Actions against law firms and lawyers ==
Case name	Date filed	Case summary	Outcome
Perkins Coie LLP v. U.S. Department of Justice (D.D.C.), 1:25-cv-00716 Appealed to the D.C. Cir., 25-5241	March 11, 2025	On March 6, 2025, President Donald Trump signed Executive Order 14230, barring the federal government from using the services of law firm Perkins Coie and suspending security clearances. On May 2, the court granted summary judgement for Perkins Coie LLP and on June 30, the defendants appealed to the D.C. Circuit. On March 2, 2026, the defendants filed notice that they would voluntarily dismiss the appeal.	Summary judgement for Perkins Coie LLP
Wilmer Cutler Pickering Hale and Dorr LLP v. Executive Office of the President (D.D.C.), 1:25-cv-00917 Appealed to the D.C. Cir., 25-5277	March 28, 2025	On March 27, 2025, President Donald Trump signed Executive Order 14250, ending contracts with Wilmer Cutler Pickering Hale and Dorr clients. The executive order cited their ties to Robert Mueller who led the Mueller special counsel investigation. On May 27, the court declared the executive order unconstitutional and on June 6, the firm amended the judgement, seeking to extend it to all federal agencies, not just the ones named in the complaint. On July 28, the defendants appealed to the D.C. Circuit. On March 2, 2026, the defendants filed notice that they would voluntarily dismiss the appeal.	Summary judgement for Wilmer Cutler Pickering Hale and Dorr LLP
Jenner & Block v. U.S. Department of Justice (D.D.C.), 1:25-cv-00916 Appealed to the D.C. Cir., 25-5265	March 28, 2025	On March 25, 2025, President Donald Trump signed Executive Order 14246, suspending security clearances for the employees of Jenner & Block, restricted their access to federal buildings, and directed federal agencies to review and potentially terminate contracts with the firm. It cited the firm's prior association with Andrew Weissmann who was involved in the Mueller special counsel investigation. On May 23, the court held that the executive order violated the First Amendment. On July 22, the defendants appealed to the D.C. Circuit. On March 2, 2026, the defendants filed notice that they would voluntarily dismiss the appeal.	Summary judgement for Jenner & Block
Susman Godfrey LLP v. Executive of the President (D.D.C.), 1:25-cv-01107 Appealed to the D.C. Cir., 25-5310	April 11, 2025	On April 9, 2025, President Donald Trump signed Executive Order 14263, suspending Susman Godfrey LLP's security clearances, restricting access to federal buildings, and directing agencies to review and potentially terminate contracts with the firm. The court held that the executive order violated the First Amendment and Fifth Amendment. On August 26, the defendants appealed to the D.C. Circuit. On March 2, 2026, the defendants filed notice that they would voluntarily dismiss the appeal.	Summary judgement for Susman Godfrey LLP
Doe 1 v. Equal Employment Opportunity Commission (D.D.C.), 1:25-cv-01124	April 15, 2025	Three law students filed a lawsuit against the Equal Employment Opportunity Commission, alleging that the government's investigation against the law firms violated their reasonable expectation of privacy.	Voluntarily dismissed
American Bar Association v. U.S. Department of Justice (D.D.C.), 1:25-cv-01263	April 23, 2025	The American Bar Association (ABA) alleges that the Trump administration violated the First Amendment and the Administrative Procedure Act by unlawfully terminating grants to the ABA Commission on Domestic and Sexual Violence.	Preliminary injunction granted Ongoing
Zaid v. Executive Office of the President (D.D.C.), 1:25-cv-01365	May 5, 2025	On March 22, 2025, President Donald Trump issued a presidential memorandum, rescinding security clearances and access to classified information to a number of lawyers, including Mark Zaid.	Ongoing
American Bar Association v. Executive Office of the President (D.D.C.), 1:25-cv-01888	June 16, 2025	The American Bar Association alleges that the Trump administration violated the First Amendment and separation of powers by targeting law firms such as suspending their security clearances and cutting off federal contracts.	Ongoing

== Actions against political opponents and civil society ==
Case name	Date filed	Case summary	Outcome
Baraka v. Habba (D.N.J.), 2:25-cv-06846	June 3, 2025	Further information: Newark immigration detention center incident On May 9, 2025, Newark mayor Ras Baraka was arrested and charged with trespassing after protesting against the opening of a new immigration detention facility. Baraka was released on bail and the charges were dropped. After the charges were dropped, Baraka announced that he was suing for damages for false arrest, malicious prosecution and accused the prosecutor, Alina Habba of defamation for comments that she had made about the arrest on X (formerly known as Twitter).	Ongoing
Media Matters for America v. Federal Trade Commission (D.D.C) 1:25-cv-01959 Appealed to the D.C. Cir., 25-5302	June 23, 2025	Media Matters for America filed a lawsuit over an FTC investigation into the organization organizing an advertiser boycott of Twitter under Elon Musk.	Preliminary injunction granted Ongoing
American Federation of Government Employees v. U.S. Department of Education (D.D.C.) 1:25-cv-03553	October 3, 2025	In the run-up to the 2025 federal government shutdown, the Department of Education demanded that furloughed workers set up an out-of-office e-mail message. That message was later changed without their knowledge to include partisan language blaming the shutdown on "Democrat Senators." The union sued on First Amendment grounds, and an expedited summary judgement went for the plaintiffs ordering for the removal of the messages.	Summary judgement for union
Aaron v. Bondi (D.D.C.) 1:25-cv-04250	December 8, 2025	The developer of the ICEBlock app claimed in a lawsuit that the government violated the First Amendment when it threatened him with criminal charges and pressured Apple to remove it from the app store. See also: ICEBlock	Ongoing
O’Hara v. Beck (D.D.C.), 1:25-cv-03753	October 23, 2025	The ACLU filed a lawsuit on behalf of a man who claims he was handcuffed and detained solely for following an Ohio National Guard patrol while playing "The Imperial March", Darth Vader's theme from The Empire Strikes Back, on his phone. He is suing the District of Columbia for violating his First and Fourth Amendment rights.	Ongoing
Longworth v. Trump (D. Or.), 6:25-cv-02268	December 5, 2025	In November of 2025, federal agents arrested and threatened to arrest protesters for using bullhorns citing new regulations prohibiting loud noises near federal property instead of on the property.	Preliminary injunction granted Ongoing
Swalwell v. Pulte (D.D.C.) 1:25-cv-04125	November 25, 2025	After Bill Pulte, the director of the Federal Housing Finance Agency, sent a letter to Attorney General Pam Bondi alleging that representative Eric Swalwell may have committed mortgage fraud, Swalwell sued claiming Pulte "abused his authority" in retaliation for his speech, violating the First Amendment and the Privacy Act of 1974.	Ongoing
UAW v. Department of State (S.D.N.Y.) 1:25-cv-08566	October 16, 2026	Three labor unions (United Auto Workers, Communications Workers of America and American Federation of Teachers) sued multiple agencies in the federal government on First Amendment grounds after the State Department claimed it revoked the visas of six people due to their comments on social media about the assassination of Charlie Kirk.	Ongoing
Kelly v. Hegseth (D.D.C.) 1:26-cv-00081	January 12, 2026	After Senator Mark Kelly and five other congressional Democrats made a video reminding service members of their duty to reject unlawful orders, Defense Secretary Pete Hegseth attempted to reduce his military rank and pension as punishment. Kelly sued, arguing the comments were first amendment protected.	Preliminary injunction granted Ongoing
Trump v. Internal Revenue Service (S.D. Fl), 1:26-cv-20609	January 29, 2026	In his personal capacity, Trump filed suit against his own Internal Revenue Service for the unauthorized leak of his tax returns during his first term. The lawsuit asked the government agency to pay him at least $10 billion. The Judge ruled that the lawsuit was filed for an "improper purpose" and referred lawyers for potential disciplinary action.	Ongoing
NewsGuard Technologies v. Federal Trade Commission (D.D.C.) 1:26-cv-00353	February 6, 2026	NewsGuard Technologies sued the Federal Trade Commission responding to what the FTC claims was a probe into illegal advertising boycotts of conservative websites. The company says the probe is retaliation and a free speech violation. "Chairman Ferguson does not like NewsGuard’s news ratings," says the lawsuit adding "The First Amendment does not allow the government to pick and choose speech based on what it likes or dislikes.”	Ongoing
University Corporation for Atmospheric Research v. National Science Foundation (D. Colo.) 1:26-cv-01061	March 16, 2026	See also: National Center for Atmospheric Research	Ongoing
Anthropic v. Department of War (N.D. Cal.) 3:26-cv-01996, appealed to the Ninth Circuit 26-2011	March 9, 2026		Ongoing
Anthropic PBC v. United States Department of War (D.C. Cir.) 26-01049	March 9, 2026		Ongoing
Garman v. Patel (D.D.C.) 1:26-cv-01086	March 31, 2026		Ongoing
United States v. Southern Poverty Law Center (M.D. Ala.) 2:26-cr-00139	April 21, 2026	Claiming the Southern Poverty Law Center supported extremist hate groups, the DOJ charged the organization with wire fraud, making false statements to a bank, and conspiracy to commit money laundering. The SPLC argues the case is vindictive prosecution.	Ongoing
Rosado v. Bondi (N.D. Ill.) 1:26-cv-01532	February 11, 2026		Ongoing
Demster v. Blanche (W.D. Tenn.) 2:26-cv-02546	May 13, 2026		Ongoing
Accountability Now USA v. Griess (D.D.C.) 1:26-cv-01385			Ongoing
The Donald J. Trump Revocable Trust v. Capital One, N.A. (S.D. Fla), 1:25-cv-21596	April 7, 2025		Ongoing

== Conditions of imprisonment ==
Case name	Date filed	Case summary	Status
Taylor v. Trump I (D.D.C.), 1:25-cv-01161	April 16, 2025	21 former death row inmates who had their sentence commuted to life without parole by the Biden administration sued the Trump administration for bypassing statutorily-required procedures for reassignment of 37 such prisoners, by using Executive Order 14164 to move 36 of them (including plaintiffs) to ADX Florence (the only "supermax" prison in the US), despite the Federal Bureau of Prisons determining that they were not suitable for transfer to ADX Florence, they also requested a temporary restraining order (TRO). The court converted the TRO request to a preliminary injunction motion, which was denied since the administrative process had not been exhausted. It noted in the Memorandum and Opinion "Still, the Court expects that the Bureau of Prisons—if, as it asserts, it is applying its normal process here—will follow what it maintains is the usual practice of not transferring Plaintiffs before their administrative appeals conclude."	Preliminary injunction denied. Briefing suspended by plaintiffs October 10, 2025.
Taylor v. Trump II 1:25-cv-03742	October 21, 2025	A related case to the above filed under seal, pursuant to a minute order granting motion to file under seal. A motion for a temporary restraining order (TRO) was also filed. On October 28, 2025, the court issued a minute order requiring the government to "48 hours written notice on the record of any transfer of Plaintiffs to ADX." while the TRO was taken under advisement.	Minute order requiring 48 hours notice issued.

== Copyright controversies ==
Under the second presidency of Donald Trump beginning in January 2025, the United States federal government has come under controversy for its unauthorized use of copyrighted works such as music, film, and video game assets in social media content promoting the administration's policies and actions, including its immigration policy and the 2026 Iran war. Many of these images and videos have been posted to the White House and the Department of Homeland Security's social media accounts as well as to Trump's personal account on Truth Social.

Several of the involved authors, performers, and copyright owners have publicly condemned the use of their works in the administration's social media content, with some videos being taken down or muted due to copyright claims. Lee Mendelson Film Productions brought a lawsuit on May 20, 2026, alleging that the U.S. Department of the Interior used a musical arrangement from the soundtrack for A Charlie Brown Christmas in a series of social media posts without its authorization. Under Title 28 of the United States Code, the available remedies in a copyright infringement lawsuit against the federal government are limited to monetary damages, and the court cannot issue an injunction to prevent further infringement. Some commentators have also suggested that the government may be able to claim fair use.

== Department of Government Efficiency ==
=== Disclosure of personal and financial records ===
Case name	Date filed	Case summary	Outcome
Alliance for Retired Americans v. Bessent (D.D.C.), 1:25-cv-00313	February 3, 2025	Federal employee unions sued the Treasury Department for granting DOGE access to sensitive financial data without legal justification, alleging violations of the Administrative Procedure Act and the Privacy Act.	Preliminary injunction denied
American Federation of Labor and Congress of Industrial Organizations v. Department of Labor (D.D.C.), 1:25-cv-00339	February 5, 2025	The American Federation of Labor and Congress of Industrial Organizations are suing the Department of Labor for allowing DOGE access to confidential agency records. The court denied the plaintiff's preliminary injunction and stated that they failed to demonstrate irreparable harm.	Preliminary injunction denied
State of New York v. Donald J. Trump (S.D.N.Y.), 1:25-cv-01144 Appealed to 2nd Cir., 25-1860	February 7, 2025	19 states, led by New York sued President Donald Trump and the United States Department of the Treasury claiming that they unlawfully expanded access to Treasury financial systems to DOGE, risking unauthorized data use and potential misuse of federal funds. On 21 February, a preliminary injunction was granted, barring the Treasury Department from granting access to DOGE. On April 11 the judge allowed one DOGE staffer access, and on May 27 allowed four more DOGE staffers and cleared the way for the entire DOGE team to get access.	Preliminary injunction granted
University of California Student Association v. Carter (D.D.C.), 1:25-cv-00354	February 7, 2025	The University of California Student Association sued over the United States Department of Education's decision to allow DOGE to access student financial records, alleging violations of the Administrative Procedure Act, the Internal Revenue Code and the Privacy Act. Judge Randolph D. Moss denied the plaintiff's TRO, stating that access to view data did not create irreparable injury and on April 8, the plaintiffs dropped the case.	Voluntarily dismissed
National Treasury Employees Union v. Vought (D.D.C.), 1:25-cv-00380	February 9, 2025	The National Treasury Employees Union allege that the Consumer Financial Protection Bureau's sharing of personnel records with DOGE violated privacy laws.	Voluntarily dismissed
American Federation of Teachers v. Bessent (D. Md.), 8:25-cv-00430	February 10, 2025	The plaintiffs alleged that the United States Department of Education had permitted their personal information to be accessed by DOGE-affiliated individuals without legal justification. The court issued a TRO on February 24 and a preliminary injunction on March 24. On April 7, the Fourth Circuit granted the government's motion to stay.	Preliminary injunction granted, then stayed by 4th Circuit
American Federation of Government Employees v. Office of Personnel Management (S.D.N.Y.), 1:25-cv-01237	February 11, 2025	Current and former employees allege that the Office of Personnel Management had permitted their personal information to be accessed by DOGE-affiliated individuals without legal justification. The court granted injunctive relief prohibiting any further disclosure of OPM records.	Preliminary injunction granted
Morris v. Trump (D. Md.), 1:25-cv-00435	February 11, 2025	Deborah Morris filed a lawsuit against the Trump administration, declaring that the creation and actions of DOGE were in violation of the Privacy Act and the False Claims Act. The court dismissed it the following day, finding that the plaintiff lacked standing as she was not personally involved in the claims made.	Dismissed by court
Nemeth-Greenleaf v. U.S. Office of Personnel Management (D.D.C.), 1:25-cv-00407	February 11, 2025	Five federal employees filed a class action lawsuit against the United States Office of Personnel Management, claiming that they had permitted their personal information to be accessed by DOGE-affiliated individuals without legal justification.	Ongoing
Gribbon v. Musk (D.D.C.), 1:25-cv-00422	February 12, 2025	Six individual plaintiffs filed a class action lawsuit stating that DOGE unlawfully accessed their personal information. On May 15, they voluntarily dropped their case.	Voluntarily dismissed
Center for Taxpayer Rights v. Internal Revenue Service (D.D.C.), 1:25-cv-00457	February 17, 2025	The Center for Taxpayer Rights challenges DOGE's access to taxpayer information stored by the Internal Revenue Service.	Ongoing
Electronic Privacy Information Center v. U.S. Office of Personnel Management (E.D.V.A.), 1:25-cv-00255	February 17, 2025	The Electronic Privacy Information Center alleges a mass data breach of federal employee and taxpayer information, citing screenshots of confidential Treasury payments. The court stated that they had not met the burden for a TRO or preliminary injunction.	Preliminary injunction denied
American Federation of State, County and Municipal Employees, AFL-CIO v. Social Security Administration (D. Md.), 1:25-cv-00596	February 21, 2025	The American Federation of State, County and Municipal Employees alleged that the Social Security Administration's gave sensitive data to DOGE personnel. The court granted a temporary restraining order on March 7 and on April 1, the Fourth Circuit dismissed an appeal by the defendant. On April 15, the District court granted a preliminary and on April 30, the Fourth Circuit denied a motion to stay. On May 2, a request for an administrative stay was appealed to SCOTUS, which was granted on June 6.	TRO granted, then stayed by SCOTUS
American Civil Liberties Union v. Social Security Administration (D.D.C.), 1:25-cv-01217	April 21, 2025	The American Civil Liberties Union sued the Social Security Administration and United States Department of Veterans Affairs for denying their Freedom of Information Act requests to information regarding DOGE’s access to sensitive personal data.	Ongoing
Gribbon v. Office of Personnel Management (D.D.C.) 1:26-cv-01575	May 8, 2026		Ongoing

=== Establishment of DOGE ===
Case name	Date Filed	Case Summary	Outcome
American Public Health Association v. Office of Management and Budget (D.D.C.), 1:25-cv-00167 (consolidated with Public Citizen v. Trump)	January 20, 2025	The plaintiffs challenged the legality of DOGE under the Federal Advisory Committee Act. On February 18, it was consolidated into Public Citizen, Inc. v. Trump. On May 12, the plaintiffs voluntarily dismissed the case.	Voluntarily dismissed
Lentini v. Department of Government Efficiency (D.D.C.), 1:25-cv-00166 (consolidated with Public Citizen v. Trump)	January 20, 2025	The plaintiff challenged the legality of DOGE under the Federal Advisory Committee Act. On February 4, it was consolidated into Public Citizen, Inc. v. Trump.	Voluntarily dismissed
Public Citizen, Inc. v. Trump (D.D.C.), 1:25-cv-00164 (consolidated with Lentini v. DOGE and American Public Health Association v. OMB)	January 20, 2025	The plaintiff challenged the legality of DOGE under the Federal Advisory Committee Act. On March 3, the plaintiffs voluntarily dismissed the case.	Voluntarily dismissed
State of New Mexico v. Musk (D.D.C.), 1:25-cv-00429 Petitioned to D.C. Circuit, In re: Elon Musk, 25-5072 (consolidated with Japanese American Citizens League v. Musk)	February 13, 2025	14 states challenges Elon Musk's role in DOGE, asserting that he is performing governmental duties without official nomination by the President or confirmation by the Senate.	TRO denied Ongoing
J. Does 1–26 v. Musk (D. Md.), 8:25-cv-00462-TDC Appealed to 4th Cir., 25-1273	February 26, 2025	26 anonymous plaintiffs, current and former employees of the United States Agency for International Development alleged that the broad scope of DOGE was in violation of the Appointments Clause and separation of powers, since Elon Musk was never confirmed by the Senate. On March 18, a preliminary injunction was granted, prohibiting the defendants from taking further action to shut down USAID, however, a stay was issued by the Fourth Circuit on March 28.	Ongoing
Center for Biological Diversity v. U.S. Department of Interior (D.D.C.), 1:25-cv-00612	March 3, 2025	The Center for Biological Diversity allege that the creation of DOGE violated the Administrative Procedure Act and the Federal Advisory Committee Act and that several federal agencies had failed to respond to FOIA requests.	Ongoing
Japanese American Citizens League v. Musk (D.D.C.), 1:25-cv-00643 (consolidated with State of New Mexico v. Musk)	March 5, 2025	The plaintiffs allege that DOGE overstepped its authority when cutting federal spending, terminating government employees and dismantling government agencies. On March 20, it was consolidated with State of New Mexico v. Musk.	Consolidated with State of New Mexico v. Musk)

=== Freedom of Information Act and record-keeping requirements ===
Case name	Date Filed	Case Summary	Outcome
Center for Biological Diversity v. Office of Management and Budget (D.D.C.), 1:25-cv-00165	January 20, 2025	The Center for Biological Diversity filed a lawsuit seeking Trump presidential transition and DOGE records regarding environmental related issues such as air and water quality, climate change, public land and imperiled plants and wildlife.	Ongoing
American Oversight v. U.S. Department of Government Efficiency (D.D.C.), 1:25-cv-00409	February 11, 2025	The American Oversight organization filed a lawsuit against DOGE, requesting communication between Elon Musk and his staff after the Office of Management and Budget failed to issue a determination within the required time for FOIA requests.	Ongoing
Citizens for Responsibility and Ethics in Washington v. U.S. DOGE Service (D.D.C.), 1:25-cv-00511 In re: U.S. DOGE Service (D.C. Cir.), 25-5130 U.S. Doge Service v. Citizens for Responsibility and Ethics in Washington (U.S. Supreme Court), 24A1122	February 20, 2025	The Citizens for Responsibility and Ethics in Washington allege that the United States Digital Service and DOGE wrongfully withheld documents relating to DOGE and its activities. On March 10, the court partially awarded a preliminary injunction and on April 15, ordered limited discovery into DOGE's activities. After being denied a stay by the D.C. Circuit, the Supreme Court ruled that portions of the discovery order had to be narrowed, but left the rest of the discovery order intact.	Preliminary injunction granted
Project on Government Oversight, Inc. v. Trump (D.D.C.), 1:25-cv-00527	February 21, 2025	The Project on Government Oversight alleges that the Trump administration's recordkeeping practices are subject to the Federal Records Act and that they have unlawfully designated their records as presidential to avoid transparency obligations. On June 17, the court denied a preliminary injunction.	Preliminary injunction denied
Democracy Forward Foundation v. U.S. Department of the Treasury (D.D.C.), 1:25-cv-00684	March 7, 2025	The Democracy Forward Foundation filed a lawsuit after being denied a FOIA request regarding communication between DOGE, government agencies and the White House.	Preliminary injunction denied
Democracy Forward Foundation v. U.S. Marshals Service (D.D.C.), 1:25-cv-00749	March 14, 2025	The Democracy Forward Foundation filed a lawsuit after several FOIA requests related to communications between the United States Marshals Service and federal judges about cases relating to the January 6 United States Capitol attack, potentially following direction from DOGE.	Ongoing
The Intercept v. U.S. Department of Government Efficiency (S.D.N.Y.), 1:25-cv-02404	March 24, 2025	The Intercept alleges that DOGE and the United States Digital Service wrongfully withheld information regarding emails between Elon Musk and staffers that were subject to a FOIA request on the erroneous assertion that they are not subject to FOIA.	Ongoing
Citizens For Responsibility And Ethics In Washington v. Consumer Financial Protection Bureau (D.D.C.), 1:25-cv-01768	April 8, 2025	In December 2024, Citizens for Responsibility and Ethics in Washington filed a FOIA request related to DOGE to a number of government agencies and did not hear back from any of them.	Ongoing

=== Large-scale reductions in force ===
- American Association of People With Disabilities v. Dudek (D.D.C.), 1:25-cv-00977
- American Federation Of Government Employees, AFL-CIO v. Office of Personnel Management and Ezell (N.D. Cal.), 3:25-cv-01780, appealed to the Ninth Circuit, 25-1677, and Office of Personnel Management v. American Federation of Government Employees (Supreme Court), 24A904
- American Federation Of Government Employees, AFL-CIO v. Trump (N.D. Cal.), 3:25-cv-03698, appealed to the 9th Cir., 25-3030 and 25-3293
- Elev8 Baltimore, Inc. v. Corporation for National and Community Service (D. Md), 1:25-cv-01458
- Jackson v. Kennedy (D.D.C.), 1:25-cv-01750
- National Treasury Employees Union v. Donald J. Trump (D.D.C.), 1:25-cv-00420 (voluntarily dismissed)
- Pueblo of Isleta v. Secretary of the Department of the Interior (D.D.C.), 1:25-cv-00696
- State of Maryland v. Corporation for National and Community Service (D. Md.),1:25-cv-01363
- State of Maryland v. U.S. Department of Agriculture (D. Md.), 1:25-cv-00748, appealed to the 4th Cir., 25-1248
- Office of Special Counsel, ex rel. v. Department of Agriculture (filed with Merit Systems Protection Board) CB-1208-25-0020-U-1

== Dismantling of agencies ==
=== Consumer Financial Protection Bureau ===
- Mayor and City Council of Baltimore v. Vought (D. Md.), 1:25-cv-00458
- National Treasury Employees Union v. Vought (D.D.C.), 1:25-cv-00381, appealed to the D.C. Cir., 25-5091
- State of New York v. Vought (D. Ore.) 0:25-cv-02384

=== Executive order 14217, pertaining to the U.S. African Development Foundation ===
- Brehm v. Marocco (D.D.C.), 1:25-cv-00660

=== Executive order 14217, pertaining to actions against the U.S. Institute of Peace ===
- Pippenger v. U.S. DOGE Service (D.D.C.), 1:25-cv-01090
- U.S. Institute of Peace v. Jackson (D.D.C.), 1:25-cv-00804, appealed to the D.C. Cir., 25-5185

=== Executive order 14238, pertaining to the Institute of Museum and Library Services, the Minority Business Development Agency, and the Federal Mediation and Conciliation Service ===
- American Federation of Teachers, AFL-CIO v. Goldstein (S.D.N.Y.), 1:25-cv-03072
- American Library Association v. Sonderling, 1:25-cv-01050
- State of Rhode Island v. Trump (D.R.I.), 1:25-cv-00128

=== Executive order 14238, pertaining to the U.S. Agency for Global Media ===
- Abramowitz v. Lake (D.D.C.), 1:25-cv-00887, appealed to the DC Cir., 25-5145
- Middle East Broadcasting Networks, Inc. v. United States (D.D.C.), 1:25-cv-00966, appealed to the DC Cir., 25-5150
- Open Technology Fund v. Lake (D.D.C.), 1:25-cv-00840
- Radio Free Asia v. United States (D.D.C.), 1:25-cv-00907, appealed to the DC Cir., 25-5151
- RFE/RL, Inc. v. Lake (D.D.C.), 1:25-cv-00799, appealed to the DC Cir., 25-5158
- Widakuswara v. Lake (D.D.C.), 1:25-cv-01015 (transferred from S.D.N.Y., 1:25-cv-02390), appealed to the DC Cir., 25-5144

=== Executive order 14242, pertaining to the U.S. Department of Education ===
- American Educational Research Association v. Department of Education (D. Md.), 8:25-cv-01230
- Association for Education Finance and Policy, Inc. v. McMahon (D.D.C.), 1:25-cv-00999
- Carter v. Department of Education (D.D.C.), 1:25-cv-00744
- Morgan v. McMahon (W.D. Tex.), 1:25-cv-00416
- NAACP v. United States of America (D.Md.), 8:25-cv-00965
- Somerville Public Schools v. Trump (D. Mass.), 1:25-cv-10677 (consolidated with State of New York v. McMahon)
- State of New York v. McMahon (D.Mass), 1:25-cv-10601, appealed to the 1st Cir., 25-1500
- Victim Rights Law Center v. U.S. Department of Education (D. Mass.) 1:25-cv-11042

=== Head Start ===
- Washington State Association of Head Start and Early Childhood Education and Assistance Program v. Kennedy (W.D. Wash.) 2:25-cv-00781

=== Department of Health and Human Services ===
- State of New York v. Kennedy (D.R.I.) 1:25-cv-00196

=== Job Corps ===
- Cabrera v. U.S. Department of Labor (D.D.C.), 1:25-cv-01909
- National Job Corps Association v. U.S. Department of Labor (S.D.N.Y.), 1:25-cv-04641

=== National Endowment for the Humanities ===
- American Council of Learned Societies v. McDonald (S.D.N.Y.), 1:25-cv-03657
- The Authors Guild v. National Endowment for the Humanities (S.D.N.Y.), 1:25-cv-03923 (case consolidated with American Council of Learned Societies v. McDonald)

=== National Institute for Occupational Safety and Health ===
- National Nurses United v. Robert F. Kennedy, Jr. (D.D.C.), 1:25-cv-01538

== Diversity, equity, inclusion and accessibility ==
- National Association of the Deaf v. Trump (D. D.C.), 1:25-cv-01683
- Espinoza v. Blanche (N.D. Ill.) 1:26-cv-05157
- National Association of Diversity Officers in Higher Education v. Trump (D. Md.) 8:26-cv-01532
- National Fair Housing Alliance v. Consumer Financial Protection Bureau (D.D.C.) 1:26-cv-01820

=== Data collection ===
- Massachusetts v. Department of Education (D. Mass.) 1:26-cv-11229

=== Dear colleague letter ===
- American Federation of Teachers v. U.S. Department of Education (D. Md.), 1:25-cv-00628, appealed to the 4th Cir., 25-2228
- NAACP v. U.S. Department of Education (D.D.C.), 1:25-cv-01120 (joint motion to dismiss with stipulation by the government)
- National Education Association v. US Department of Education (D.N.H.), 1:25-cv-00091

=== Executive orders 14151, 14168 and 14173, pertaining to a ban on DEIA initiatives and transgender rights in the executive branch and by contractors and grantees ===
- American Association of Colleges for Teacher Education v. McMahon (D. Md.), 1:25-cv-00702, appealed to the Fourth Circuit, 25-1281
- Chicago Women in Trades v. Trump (N.D. Ill.), 1:25-cv-02005, appealed to the 7th Cir., 25-2144
- Commonwealth of Massachusetts v. Trump (D. Mass.), 1:25-cv-12162
- Cross v. Equal Employment Opportunity Commission (D.D.C.), 1:25-cv-03702 (case dismissed)
- Doe 1 v. Office of the Director of National Intelligence (E.D.Va.), 1:25-cv-00300, appealed to the 4th Cir., 25-1527
- Doe v. Collins (D.D.C.), 1:25-cv-00760 (voluntary dismissal by plaintiffs)
- Erie County New York v. Corporation for National and Community Service (D.D.C.), 1:25-cv-00783 (voluntary dismissal by plaintiffs)
- Fell v. Trump (D.D.C.), 1:25-cv-04206
- FreeState Justice v. Equal Employment Opportunity Commission (D. Md.), 1:25-cv-02482
- National Association of Diversity Officers in Higher Education v. Trump (D. Md.), 1:25-cv-00333, appealed to the Fourth Circuit, 25-1189
- National Urban League v. Trump (D.D.C.), 1:25-cv-00471
- Rhode Island Latino Arts v. National Endowment for the Arts (D. R.I.), 1:25-cv-00079, appealed to the 1st Cir., 25-2113
- San Francisco AIDS Foundation v. Trump (D.D.C.), 4:25-cv-01824, appealed to the 9th Cir., 25-4988
- Southern Education Foundation v. Department of Education (D.D.C.), 1:25-cv-01079, appealed to DC Cir., 25-5262 (voluntary dismissal by plaintiffs)
- State of California v. U.S Department of Education (D. Mass.), 1:25-cv-10548, appealed to the 1st Cir., 25-1244, appealed to the Supreme Court as Department of Education v. California, 24A910
- Withrow v. United States (D.D.C.), 1:25-cv-04073

=== Executive orders 14168, 14185 and 14190, pertaining to the removal of books from school libraries ===
- E.K. v. Department of Defense Education Activity (E.D. Va.), 1:25-cv-00637, appealed to the 4th Cir., 25-2497 and 26-1002
- King County v. Turner (W.D. Wa.), 2:25-cv-00814, appealed to the 9th Cir., 25-3664
- Bakken v. United States Military Academy (S.D.N.Y.) 7:25-cv-07826

=== Executive Order 14253 ===
- City of Philadelphia v. Burgum (E.D. Pennsylvania), 2:26-cv-00434
- National Parks Conservation Association v. Department of the Interior (D. Mass.) 1:26-cv-10877, appealed to First Circuit 26-1714

== Elections and voter registration ==
- Common Cause v. Department of Homeland Security (S.D.N.Y), 1:26-cv-08882
- Common Cause v. Department of Justice (D.D.C), 1:26-cv-01352
- Democratic National Committee v. Trump (D.D.C.), 1:26-cv-03506
- Democratic National Committee v. U.S. Department of Justice (D.D.C.), 1:26-cv-02928
- DSCC v. Trump (D.D.C.), 1:26-cv-03674
- League of Women Voters v. Department of Homeland Security (D.D.C.) 1:25-cv-03501
- LULAC v. Abbott (W.D. Tex.) 3:21-cv-00259
- NAACP v. USPS (D.D.C.) 1:20-cv-02295, appealed to the DC Cir. 26-5257
- National Council of Jewish Women v. U.S. Citizenship and Immigration Services (D. Md.), 8:25-cv-03675

=== Executive order 14248 ===
- League of United Latin American Citizens v. Executive Office of the President (D.D.C.), 1:25-cv-00946
  - Democratic National Committee v. Trump (D.D.C.), 1:25-cv-00952
  - League of Women Voters Education Fund v. Trump (D.D.C.), 1:25-cv-00955
- State of California v. Trump (D. Mass.), 1:25-cv-10810
- State of Washington v. Trump (W.D. Wa.), 2:25-cv-00602

Democratic National Committee v. Trump, League of Latin American Citizens v. Executive Office of the President and League of Women Voters Education Fund v. Trump have been consolidated and proceed under League of United Latin American Citizens v. Executive Office of the President.

=== Executive Order 14399 ===
- California v. Trump (D. Mass.) 1:26-cv-11581, appealed to First Circuit 26-1774, appealed to Supreme Court (shadow docket) 26A124
- Democratic Senatorial Campaign Committee v. Trump (D.D.C.) 1:26-cv-01114
- League of United Latin American Citizens v. Executive Office of the President (D.D.C.) 1:26-cv-01132
- League of Women Voters of Massachusetts v. Trump (D. Mass.), 1:26-cv-11549
- NAACP v. Trump (D.D.C.) 1:26-cv-01151

=== State voter rolls ===
As of July 2026, judges ruled against the administration in all (16) decisions issued regarding the administration's lawsuits seeking state voter rolls.

== Environment ==
- Arizona v. Environmental Protection Agency (W.D. Wash.) 2:25-cv-02015

=== Alligator Alcatraz ===
- Friends of the Everglades, Inc. v. Noem (S.D. Fla.) 1:25-cv-22896

=== Cancellation of mitigation right-of-way on Alaska's North Slope ===
- Nuiqsut Trilateral, Inc. v. Burgum (D.D.C.), 1:26-cv-00239

=== Claim of federal jurisdiction over oil pipelines ===
- State of California v. Pipeline and Hazardous Materials Safety Administration (9th Cir.), 26-0508

=== Construction on public lands ===
- Conserve Southwest Utah v. U.S. Department of the Interior (D.D.C.), 1:26-cv-00317
- Defenders of Wildlife v. Burgum (D. Alaska), 3:25-cv-00319
- Lopez v. United States of America (D. Ariz.), 2:25-cv-02758, appealed to the 9th Cir., 25-5197
- Native Village of Hooper Bay v. Burgum (D. Alaska), 3:25-cv-00316
- Southern Utah Wilderness Alliance v. U.S. Department of the Interior (D. Utah), 2:25-cv-00657

=== Deletion of climate change data from federal websites ===
- Northeast Organic Farming Association of New York v. U.S. Department of Agriculture (S.D.N.Y.), 1:25-cv-01529

=== Elimination of the Environmental and Climate Justice block grant program ===
- Appalachian Voices v. U.S. Environmental Protection Agency (D.D.C.), 1:25-cv-01982

=== Endangered Species Act ===
- Center for Biological Diversity v. U.S. Environmental Protection Agency (9th Cir.), 26-0298
- Center for Biological Diversity v. U.S. Fish and Wildlife Service (D.D.C.), 1:26-cv-00043
- Center for Biological Diversity v. U.S. Fish and Wildlife Service (W.D. Wash.), 2:25-cv-02125

=== Environmental impact requirements ===
- Center For Biological Diversity v. National Marine Fisheries Service (N.D. Cal.), 4:25-cv-09109
- Center For Biological Diversity v. U.S. Department of Agriculture (N.D. Cal.), 3:26-cv-00866
- Sovereign Inupiat for a Living Arctic v. Burgum (D. Alaska), 3:25-cv-00356

=== Executive Order 14148 ===
- Northern Alaska Environmental Center v. Trump (D. Alaska), 3:25-cv-00038

=== Executive Order 14156 ===
- Lighthiser v. Trump (D. Mont.), 2:25-cv-00054, appealed to the 9th Cir., 25-6714
- State of Washington v. Trump (W.D. Wash.) 2:25-cv-00869

=== Modification of national parks passes ===
- Center for Biological Diversity v. Burgum (D.D.C.), 1:25-cv-04285

=== Oil drilling on protected lands ===
- Gwich'in Steering Committee v. U.S. Department of the Interior (D. Alaska), 3:20-cv-00204

=== Opening the Pacific Islands Heritage Marine National Monument to commercial fishing ===
- Kāpaʻa v. Trump (D. Haw.), 1:25-cv-00209

=== Opening the Northeast Canyons and Seamounts Marine National Monument ===
- Conservation Law Foundation v. Trump (D.D.C.) 1:26-cv-01528

=== Reconsideration of the endangerment finding ===
- Environmental Defense Fund v. United States Department of the Interior (D.D.C), 1:25-cv-00871
- Environmental Defense Fund, Inc. v. Wright (D. Mass.), 1:25-cv-12249
- American Public Health Association v. EPA (D.C. Cir.) 26-1037
- Massachusetts v. EPA (D.C. Cir.) 26-1061
- Environmental Defense Fund v. Wright (D.D.C.) 1:26-cv-00928

=== Renewable energy ===
- Oregon Environmental Council v. Internal Revenue Service (D.D.C.), 1:25-cv-04400

==== Solar energy ====
- Maryland Clean Energy Center v. United States (Fed. Cl.) 1:25-cv-01738

==== Wind energy ====
- Empire Leaseholder LLC v. Burgum (D.D.C.), 1:26-cv-00004
- Mayor & City Council of Ocean City v. U.S. Department of the Interior (D. Md.) 1:24-cv-03111
- Protect Our Coast NJ v. United States (D.N.J.), 3:25-cv-06890
- Revolution Wind LLC v. Burgum (D.D.C.) 1:25-cv-02999
- State of New York v. Burgum (D.D.C.) 1:26-cv-00071 and 1:26-cv-00072
- State of New York v. U.S. Department of the Interior (D.D.C.) 1:26-cv-01910
- State of New York v. Trump (D. Mass.) 1:25-cv-11221 (summary judgment in favor of plaintiffs)
- State of Rhode Island v. U.S. Department of the Interior (D.D.C.), 1:25-cv-04328
- Sunrise Wind LLC v. Burgum (D.D.C.), 1:26-cv-00028
- Vineyard Wind 1 LLC v. U.S. Department of the Interior (D. Mass.), 1:26-cv-10156
- Virginia Electric and Power Company v. U.S. Department of the Interior (E.D. Va.), 2:25-cv-00830

=== Vehicle and emissions standards ===
- CleanAIRE NC v. Trump (D.D.C.), 1:26-cv-00233
- State of California v. United States of America (N.D. Ca.), 4:25-cv-04966, appealed to the 9th Cir., 25-8013

== Epstein Files ==
- MSW Media, Inc. v U.S. Department of Justice (D.D.C), 1:25-cv-02518
- Phang v. Blanche (D.D.C), 1:26-cv-01417
- State of New Mexico v. U.S. Department of Justice (D.D.C.), 1:26-cv-02762
- American Oversight v. U.S. Department of Justice (D.D.C.), 1:26-cv-02212

== Executive control over independent agencies ==
- Board of Governors of the Federal Reserve System v. United States (D.D.C), 1:26-mc-00012-JEB
- Cook v. Trump (D.D.C.), 1:25-cv-02903
- Corporation for Public Broadcasting v. Trump (D.D.C.), 1:25-cv-01305

=== Executive Order 14215 ===
- Democratic National Committee v. Trump (D.D.C.), 1:25-cv-00587 (dismissed)

=== Removal of independent agency heads ===
- Aviel v. Gor (D.D.C.), 1:25-cv-00778, appealed to the D.C. Cir., 25-5105
- Boyle v. Trump (D. Md.), 8:25-cv-01628
- Brown v. Trump (D.D.C.), 1:25-cv-01764
- Dellinger v. Bessent (D.D.C.), 1:25-cv-00385, appealed to the D.C. Cir., 25-5025 / 25-5028 / 25-5052, appealed to the Supreme Court, Bessent v. Dellinger, 24A790 (case closed after petitioner withdrew it)
- Grundmann v. Trump (D.D.C.), 1:25-cv-00425, appealed to the D.C. Cir., 25-5165
- Harris v. Bessent (D.D.C.), 1:25-cv-00412, appealed to the D.C. Cir., 25-5055 and 25-5037, appealed to the Supreme Court, Bessent v. Harris (consolidated with Trump v. Wilcox)
- LeBlanc v. U.S. Privacy and Civil Liberties Oversight Board (D.D.C.), 1:25-cv-00542, appealed to the D.C. Cir., 25-5197
- Perlmutter v. Blanche (D.D.C.), 1:25-cv-01659; appealed to the D.C. Cir. 25-5285;
- Primus v. Trump (D.D.C.) 1:25-cv-03521
- Samuels v. Trump (D.D.C.), 1:25-cv-01069
- Slaughter v. Trump (D.D.C.), 1:25-cv-00909
- Wilcox v. Trump (D.D.C.), 1:25-cv-00334, appealed to the D.C. Cir., 25-5057, appealed to the Supreme Court, Trump v. Wilcox, 24A966
- Marvit v. Trump (D.D.C.) 1:26-cv-01563

== Federalism ==
=== Deployment of ICE agents to Minnesota ===
- Hussen v. Noem (D. Minnesota), 0:26-cv-00324
- State of Minnesota v. Noem (D. Minnesota), 0:26-cv-00190

=== Federalizing the California National Guard ===
- Newsom v. Trump (N.D.Ca.), 3:25-cv-04870, appealed to the 9th Cir., 25-3727

=== Federalizing the Illinois National Guard and deploying the Texas National Guard to Illinois ===
- State of Illinois v. Department of Homeland Security (N.D. Ill.), 1:26-cv-00321
- State of Illinois v. Trump (N.D. Ill.), 1:25-cv-12174, appealed to the 7th Cir., 25-2798

=== Federalizing the Oregon National Guard and deploying the National Guard from other states to Oregon ===
- State of Oregon v. Trump (D. Ore.), 3:25-cv-01756, appealed to the 9th Cir., 25-6268

=== Rescission of approval of New York City's congestion pricing plan ===
- Metropolitan Transportation Authority v. Duffy (S.D.N.Y.), 1:25-cv-01413

=== Takeover of Washington, D.C. metropolitan police department ===
- District of Columbia v. Trump (D.D.C.), 1:25-cv-02678 (voluntarily dismissed by plaintiffs)
- District of Columbia v. Trump (D.D.C.) 1:25-cv-03005, appealed to the D.C. Cir., 25-5418

=== Tennessee ===
- Harris v. Lee (Tennessee Chancery Court) 25-1461-I

== Federal building renovations ==
=== Changes to the Kennedy Center ===
- Beatty v. Trump (D.D.C.), 1:25-cv-04480, appealed to the D.C. Cir., 26-5224
- Washington National Opera v. United States (Fed. Cl.), 1:26-cv-00864

=== Demolition of East Wing and construction of ballroom ===
- National Trust for Historic Preservation v. Trump (D.D.C.), 1:25-cv-04316

=== Painting of Eisenhower Executive Office Building ===
- DC Preservation League and Cultural Heritage Partners v. Trump (D.D.C.),1:25-cv-03969

=== Proposed Arch at Memorial Circle ===
- Lemmon v. Trump (D.D.C.), 1:26-cv-00544

=== Removal of Pride flag from Stonewall National Monument ===
- Gilbert Baker Foundation v. U.S. Department of Interior (S.D.N.Y.), 1:26-cv-01317

=== Resurfacing of the Lincoln Memorial Reflecting Pool ===
- Cultural Landscape Foundation v. Department of the Interior (D.D.C.), 1:26-cv-01593

=== UFC Freedom 250 ===
- Douglas v. National Park Service (D.D.C.) 1:26-cv-02016

== First Amendment ==
=== Freedom of the press ===
==== Alleged defamation by press ====
- Trump v. Murdoch (S.D. Fla.), 1:25-cv-23232 (dismissed without prejudice)
- Trump v. New York Times (M.D. Fla.), 8:25-cv-02487

==== Broadcasting licenses ====
- American Broadcasting Companies, Inc. v. Federal Communications Commission (D.D.C.), 1:26-Cv-02902

==== Executive order 14172 ====
===== Associated Press v. Budowich =====
The Associated Press has sued three members of the White House Office for banning them from press pool events in the Oval Office and aboard Air Force One, in response to the organization's continued references to the Gulf of Mexico instead of the "Gulf of America", the name promulgated in Executive Order 14172.

- Associated Press v. Budowich (D.D.C.), 1:25-cv-00532, appealed to the D.C. Cir., 25-5109

==== Executive Order 14290 ====
- National Public Radio, Inc. v. Trump (D.D.C.), 1:25-cv-01674
- Public Broadcasting Service v. Trump (D.D.C.), 1:25-cv-01722

==== Force used against reporters ====
- Chicago Headline Club v. Noem (N.D. Ill.), 1:25-cv-12173
- Los Angeles Press Club v. Noem (C.D. Cal.), 2:25-cv-05563, appealed to the 9th Cir., 25-5975

==== Pentagon access ====
- The New York Times Company v. Department of Defense (D.D.C.) 1:25-cv-04218
- Slavin v. Parnell (D.D.C.), 1:26-cv-03009

==== Truth Social access ====
- The Intercept Media v. Trump (S.D.N.Y.), 1:26-cv-06867

==== White House access ====
- Cable News Network, Inc. v. Trump (D.D.C.), 1:26-cv-03287, appealed to the D.C. Cir., 26-5356
- Roth v. Trump (S.D.N.Y.), 1:26-cv-09327

=== Freedom of speech ===
- Streever v. Mullin (D.D.C.), 1:26-cv-02356

== Freedom of Information Act, records retention and online information removal ==
- America First Legal Foundation v. Roberts (D.D.C.), 1:25-cv-01232
- American Oversight v. Hegseth (D.D.C.), 1:25-cv-00883
- American Oversight v. Internal Revenue Service (D.D.C.), 1:25-cv-01585
- Cato Institute v. U.S. Special Operations Command (D.D.C.), 1:25-cv-01719
- Center for Biological Diversity v. U.S. Department of Interior (D.D.C.), 1:25-cv-01131
- Citizens for Responsibility and Ethics in Washington v. Centers for Disease Control and Prevention (D.D.C.), 1:25-cv-01020
- Citizens for Responsibility and Ethics in Washington v. Office of Management and Budget (D.D.C.), 1:25-cv-01051
- Democracy Forward Foundation v. Office of Management and Budget (D.D.C.), 1:25-cv-00586
- Democracy Forward Foundation v. Office of Personnel Management (D.D.C.), 1:25-cv-00567
- Democracy Forward Foundation v. U.S. Department of Education (D.D.C.), 1:25-cv-00940
- Democracy Forward Foundation v. U.S. Department of Justice (D.D.C.), 1:25-cv-01535
- Environmental Defense Fund v. U.S. Environmental Protection Agency (D.D.C.), 1:25-cv-00617
- Georgetown Law Center on Privacy and Technology v. Customs and Border Protection (D.D.C), 1:25-cv-01732
- Northeast Organic Farming Association of New York v. U.S. Department of Agriculture (S.D.N.Y.), 1:25-cv-01529
- Protect Democracy Project v. U.S. Office of Management and Budget (D.D.C.), 1:25-cv-01111
- Public Employees for Environmental Responsibility v. Department of the Interior (D.D.C.) 1:26-cv-01611
- American Civil Liberties Union v. Department of Justice (S.D.N.Y.) 1:25-cv-10189

=== Presidential Records Act ===
- American Historical Association v. Trump (D.D.C.), 1:26-cv-01169
- Freedom of the Press Foundation v. Trump (D.D.C.) 1:26-cv-01402

== Gender identity ==
=== Executive order 14168, pertaining to the housing of transgender inmates ===
- Doe v. McHenry (D.D.C.), 1:25-cv-00286 (retitled Doe v. Bondi), appealed to the D.C. Cir., 25-5213, 25-5304 and 25-5419
- Jones v. Trump (D.D.C), 1:25-cv-00401 (retitled Jones v. Bondi), appealed to the D.C. Cir., 25-5101, 25-5210 25-5306 and 25-5420
- Kingdom v. Trump (D.D.C), 1:25-cv-00691
- Moe v. Trump (D. Mass.), 1:25-cv-10195, transferred to 1:25-cv-00653 (D.D.C.), appealed to the D.C. Cir., 25-5108
- Doe v. Blanche (D.C. Cir.), 25-5099 (consolidated appeals from 1:25-cv-00286, 1:25-cv-00401, 1:25-cv-00653; vacated and remanded)
- Poe v. U.S. Department of Justice (D.D.C), 1:26-cv-01552

=== Executive order 14168, pertaining to the passport policy for transgender people ===
- Orr v. Trump (D. Mass), 1:25-cv-10313, appealed to the 1st Cir., 25-1579, appealed to the Supreme Court, Trump v. Orr, 25A319
- Schlacter v. U.S. Department of State (D.Md), 1:25-cv-01344

=== Executive order 14168, pertaining to the removal of information on gender-related topics from federal websites ===
- Doctors for America v. Office of Personnel Management (D.D.C.), 1:25-cv-00322
- Schiff v. U.S. Office of Personnel Management (D. Mass), 1:25-cv-10595

=== Executive orders 14168 and 14187, pertaining to the ban on gender affirming care for individuals under the age of 19 ===
- Doe v. Department of Defense (D. Md.), 8:25-cv-02947
- PFLAG, Inc. v. Trump (D. Md.), 8:25-cv-00337
- State of Washington v. Trump (W.D. Wash), 2:25-cv-00244
- Commonwealth of Massachusetts v. Trump (D. Mass.), 1:25-cv-12162
- State of Oregon v. Kennedy (D. Oregon), 6:25-cv-02409
- State of Illinois v. Department of Health and Human Services (D. Massachusetts), 1:26-cv-14051
- Goe v. Department of Health and Human Services (D. New Hampshire), 1:26-cv-00803

=== Executive orders 14168 and 14201, pertaining to the ban on transgender athletes in women’s sports ===
- State of California v. U.S. Department of Justice (N.D. Cal.), 3:25-cv-04863
- State of Maine v. U.S. Department of Agriculture (D. Me.), 1:25-cv-00131 (voluntarily dismissed with prejudice)
- Tirrell v. Edelblut (D.N.H.), 1:24-cv-00251
- United States v. California Interscholastic Federation (C.D. Cal.), 8:25-cv-01485
- United States v. Minnesota Department of Education (D. Minnesota), 0:26-cv-02078

=== Executive order 14183, pertaining to the ban on transgender individuals serving in the military ===
- Ireland v. Hegseth (D. N.J.), 1:25-cv-01918
- Ireland v. United States, 1:25-cv-01921
- Shilling v. Trump (W.D. Wash.), 2:25-cv-00241, appealed to the Ninth Circuit, 25-2039 (retitled Shilling v. United States), appealed to the Supreme Court, United States v. Shilling, 24A1030
- Talbott v. Trump (D.D.C.), 1:25-cv-00240

=== Executive order 14168, pertaining to the ban on including gender identity in sex education curriculum ===
- State of Washington v. United States Department of Health and Human Services (D. Oregon), 6:25-cv-01748

=== Executive order 14168, pertaining to restrictions on the duties of transgender TSA officers ===
- Mittereder v. Noem (E.D. Virginia), 1:25-cv-01991

=== Executive order 14168, pertaining to civil rights of transgender employees of the federal government ===
- O'Neill v. Hartman (D. Maryland), 1:25-cv-04228

=== Executive order 14168, pertaining to making HHS grant funding conditional on complying with this EO ===
- State of New York v. U.S. Department of Health and Human Services (D. Rhode Island), 1:26-cv-00022
- American Academy of HIV Medicine v. Health Resources and Services Administration (D. Massachusetts), 1:26-cv-12638

=== Executive order 14187, pertaining to making education funding conditional on the forced outing of transgender students ===
- State of California v. U.S. Department of Education (N.D. California), 3:26-cv-01259

=== Subpoenas ===
Administrative subpoenas
Case	Provider subpoenaed	Lawsuit filed	Notes	Outcome
QueerDoc PLC v. United States Department of Justice (W.D. Wash.) 2:25-mc-00042, appealed to the Ninth Circuit 25-7384	QueerDoc (telehealth)	July 8, 2025	Quashed by Judge Jamal Whitehead in October 2025. In August 2026, a 3-judge panel on the Ninth Circuit overturned the injunction in 2-1 ruling along ideological lines. The Ninth Circuit sent the case back to Judge Whitehead, but did not order QueerDoc to turn over the documents sought by the subpoena. On September 28, 2026, QueerDoc filed a petition with the Ninth Circuit seeking an en banc rehearing.	Ongoing
In Re: 2025 Subpoena to Children's National Hospital (D. Md.) 1:25-cv-03780, appealed to Fourth Circuit 26-1104	Children's National Hospital	November 17, 2025	Quashed for limited plaintiffs by Judge Julie Rubin in January 2026.	Preliminary injunction granted
In re 2025 UPMC Subpoena (W.D. Pa.) 2:25-mc-01069	University of Pittsburgh Medical Center	September 24, 2025	A judge quashed the subpona in March 2026. The DOJ appealed to the Third Circuit, but dropped its appeal in August 2026. The case was subsequently voluntarily dismissed leaving in place the ruling that permanently quashed its subpoena.	Voluntarily dismissed
In Re 2025 Childrens Hospital of Los Angeles Subpoena (C.D. Cal.) 2:25-cv-11183	Childrens Hospital of Los Angeles	November 21, 2025	The DOJ withdrew the subpoena in January 2026 and the case was voluntarily dismissed.	Voluntarily dismissed
In Re: Administrative Subpoena No. 25-1431-014 (E.D. Pa.) 2:25-mc-00054, appealed to the Third Circuit 26-1134	Children's Hospital of Philadelphia	September 22, 2025	Quashed by Judge Judge Mark A. Kearney in November 2025. The DOJ appealed to the Third Circuit, but in May 2026, voluntarily dropped the appeal.	Voluntarily dismissed
In Re: Subpoena No. 25-1431-014 (E.D. Pa.) 2:25-mc-00039	Children's Hospital of Philadelphia	July 8, 2025	In July 2025, the court stayed the hospital's obligation to comply with the subpoena while the case proceeds.	Preliminary injunction granted
Department of Justice Administrative Subpoena No. 25-1431-030 (D. Colo.) 1:25-mc-00063	Children's Hospital Colorado	August 8, 2025		Ongoing
In Re: Administrative Subpoena 25-1431-032 (N.D. Tex.) 4:26-mc-00006, appealed to Fifth Circuit 26-10431	Rhode Island Hospital	April 30, 2026	Filed by the Department of Justice to enforce the subpoena Compliance ordered on April 30, 2026 by Judge Reed O'Connor. RIH is entitled to seek reconsideration or file any other motion in this Court and to seek relief before the United States Court of Appeals for the Fifth Circuit or the United States Supreme Court but not in front of any other court. (...) RIH is hereby ENJOINED from seeking relief, encouraging others to seek relief, or cooperate with others in seeking relief from any other court related to these proceedings, and from aiding and abetting others or encouraging others from seeking relief from any other court but those identified above. — Reed O'Connor SO ORDERED on this 18th day of May, 2026.	Preliminary injunction denied
In Re: Motion to Quash Administrative Subpoena to Rhode Island Hospital (D.R.I.) 1:26-mc-00007, appealed to First Circuit 26-1568	Rhode Island Hospital	May 4, 2026	Quashed by Judge Mary S. McElroy in May 2026. Injunction not to produce records to O'Connor pending appeal denied by Judges Gustavo Gelpí, Lara Montecalvo and Joshua Dunlap on First Circuit. The records will be produced to O'Connor, but held in the custody of the court and unavailable to the DOJ pending an appeal.	Preliminary injunction denied
In Re: Administrative Subpoena No. 25-1431-019 (D. Mass.) 1:25-mc-91324	Boston Children's Hospital	July 8, 2025	Quashed by Judge Myong J. Joun in September 2025.	Preliminary injunction granted
Seattle Children's Hospital v. United States Department of Justice (W.D. Wash.) 2:25-mc-00041	Seattle Children's Hospital	July 8, 2025	Quashed by Judge John H. Chun in September 2025.	Preliminary injunction granted
In Re Administrative Subpoenas to Children's Hospitals (D. Md.), 1:26-cv-01834	All	May 8, 2026	Country-wide class certification denied by Judge Julie Rubin.	Preliminary injunction denied
FTC v. Mount Sinai Hospitals Group (S.D. New York), 1:26-mc-00532	Mount Sinai	October 27, 2026		Ongoing

Federal grand jury subpoenas in the Northern District of Texas
Case	Provider subpoenaed	Lawsuit filed	Notes	Outcome
Z.A. v. Blanche (N.D. Cal.), 5:26-cv-04998	Lucile Salter Packard Children's Hospital at Stanford	May 27, 2026 (AMENDED COMPLAINT June 8)	Temporary restraining order and provisional class certification granted by Judge P. Casey Pitts on July 2, 2026. On July 9, 2026, the DOJ announced an appeal to the United States Court of Appeals for the Ninth Circuit.	Preliminary injunction granted
Coe v. Blanche (S.D. New York), 1:26-cv-04641, appealed to the Second Circuit 26-1886	NYU Langone Health	June 2, 2026	Temporary restraining order and provisional class certification granted by Judge Katherine Polk Failla on June 24, 2026. On July 10, 2026, the DOJ announced an appeal to the United States Court of Appeals for the Second Circuit.	Preliminary injunction granted

=== Civil investigative demands ===
Civil investigative demands to medical organizations over gender-affirming care
Case	Organization	Lawsuit filed	Notes	Outcome
WPATH v. FTC (D. D.C.), 1:26-cv-00532	World Professional Association for Transgender Health	February 18, 2026	Preliminary injunction granted on May 8, 2026. CID withdrawn on June 17, 2026 following the filing of FTC v. WPATH. On October 29, 2026, the case was dismissed as "moot".	Dismissed
Endocrine Society v. FTC (D. D.C.), 1:26-cv-00512	Endocrine Society	February 17, 2026	Preliminary injunction granted on May 8, 2026. CID withdrawn on June 17, 2026 following the filing of FTC v. WPATH. The case was subsequently dismissed voluntarily.	Voluntarily dismissed
AAP v. FTC (D. D.C.), 1:26-cv-00508	American Academy of Pediatrics	February 17, 2026	CID withdrawn on June 17, 2026 following the filing of FTC v. WPATH. The case was subsequently dismissed voluntarily.	Voluntarily dismissed

=== Lawsuits ===
Lawsuits against medical organizations over gender-affirming care
Case	Organization	Lawsuit filed	Notes	Outcome
FTC v. WPATH (N.D. Texas), 4:26-cv-00748	World Professional Association for Transgender Health	June 17, 2026		Ongoing

== Government personnel ==
=== Disclosure of civil servant personnel records ===
- Comans v. Department of Homeland Security (D.D.C.), 1:25-cv-00624

=== Executive order 14147, pertaining to Department of Justice review of FBI personnel involved in January 6 investigations ===
- Does 1-9 v. Department of Justice (D.D.C.), 1:25-cv-00325
- Federal Bureau of Investigation Agents Association v. Department of Justice (D.D.C.), 1:25-cv-00328

=== Executive order 14171, pertaining to the reinstatement of schedule F ===
- American Federation of Government Employees, AFL-CIO v. Trump (D.D.C.), 1:25-cv-00264
- Government Accountability Project v. U.S. Office of Personnel Management (D.D.C.), 1:25-cv-00347
- National Treasury Employees Union v. Trump (D.D.C.), 1:25-cv-00170
- Public Employees for Environmental Responsibility v. Trump (D. Md.), 8:25-cv-00260

=== Federal deferred resignation program ("Fork in the Road" memo) ===
- American Federation of Government Employees, AFL-CIO v. Ezell (D. Mass), 1:25-cv-10276

=== Federal employees' freedom of speech ===
- American Federation of Government Employees, AFL-CIO v. Kupor (D. Mass.), 1:25-cv-13305
- Does v. Patel (D.D.C.), 1:25-cv-04258
- Joslin v. U.S. Department of the Interior (D.D.C.), 1:26-cv-00576
- Marrazzo v. Kennedy Jr. (D. Md.), 1:25-cv-04144
- National Association of Immigration Judges v. Neal (E.D. Va.), 1:20-cv-00731
- Schnitt v. Bondi (D.D.C), 1:25-cv-04111
- Wright v. Noem (D.D.C.), 1:26-cv-00144

=== Rescission of collective bargaining ===
- American Federation of Government Employees, AFL-CIO v. Noem (W.D. Wa.), 2:25-cv-00451, appealed to the D.C. Cir., 25-5157
- American Federation Of Government Employees, AFL-CIO v. Trump (N.D. Cal.), 4:25-cv-03070
- American Foreign Service Association v. Trump, 1:25-cv-01030
- National Treasury Employees Union v. Trump (D.D.C.), 1:25-cv-00935
- International Federation of Professional & Technical Engineers, AFL-CIO v. Trump (D.D.C.) 1:25-cv-03615
- International Brotherhood of Electrical Workers v. Trump (D.D.C.) 1:25-cv-03826
- National Council of Prison Locals, American Federation of Government Employees v. Federal Bureau of Prisons (D.D.C.) 3:25-cv-01907
- Department of Treasury v. National Treasury Employees Union Chapter 73 (E.D. Ky.) 2:25-cv-00049
- American Federation of State, County and Municipal Employees, AFL-CIO v. Trump (D.D.C.) 1:25-cv-03306
- National Weather Service Employees Organization v. Trump (D.D.C.) 1:25-cv-02947
- American Federation of Labor and Congress of Industrial Organizations v. Trump (D.D.C.) 1:25-cv-02445
- National Association of Agriculture Employees v. Trump (D.D.C.) 1:25-cv-02657
- Department of Defense v. American Federation of Government Employees (W.D. Tex.) 1:25-cv-01362

=== Removal of FBI agents ===
- Doe 1 v. Patel (D.D.C.), 1:26-cv-00959

=== Removal of inspectors general ===
- Storch v. Hegseth (D.D.C.), 1:25-cv-00415

=== Solicitation of information ===
- Jane Does 1-2 v. Office of Personnel Management (D.D.C.), 1:25-cv-00234

== Grants, loans, and assistance ==
=== 2025 SNAP ===
- Massachusetts v. USDA (D. Mass.) 1:25-cv-13165
- Rhode Island State Council of Churches v. Rollins (D.R.I.) 1:25-cv-00569

=== Anti-Weaponization Fund ===
- Citizens for Responsibility and Ethics in Washington v. Department of Justice (D.D.C.), 1:26-cv-01789
- Dunn v. Trump (D.D.C.), 1:26-cv-01719
- Floyd v. Department of Justice (E.D. Va.), 1:26-cv-01399
- Gill v. Department of Justice (S.D. Cal.), 3:26-cv-03283
- Gordon v. Blanche (D.D.C.), 1:26-cv-01907

=== Denial of grants ===
- American Association of Physicians for Human Rights v. National Institutes of Health (D.Md.), 8:25-cv-01620
- American Public Health Association v. National Institutes of Health (D. Mass.), 1:25-cv-10787, appealed to the 1st Cir., 25-1611, appealed to the Supreme Court as National Institutes of Health v. American Public Health Association, 25A103 (joint stipulation, plaintiffs dismissed their remaining claims)
- City of New York v. Trump (S.D.N.Y.), 1:25-cv-01510
- Climate United Fund v. Citibank (D.D.C.), 1:24-cv-00698, appealed to the D.C. Cir., 25-5122 and 25-5123
- Commonwealth of Massachusetts v. Kennedy (D. Mass.), 1:25-cv-10814, appealed to the 1st Cir., 25-1612 (consolidated with American Public Health Association v. National Institutes of Health, joint stipulation, plaintiffs dismissed their remaining claims)
- Harris County, Texas v. Kennedy (D.D.C), 1:25-cv-01275
- Massachusetts Fair Housing Center v. Department of Housing and Urban Development (D. Mass), 3:25-cv-30041, appealed to the 1st Cir., 25-1368 (joint motion to dismiss)
- Metropolitan Government Of Nashville And Davidson County, Tennessee v. U.S. Department Of Homeland Security (D.D.C.), 1:26-Cv-02886
- National Alliance to End Homelessness v. Turner (D.R.I.), 1:25-cv-00447
- Rhode Island Coalition Against Domestic Violence v. Bondi (D. R.I.), 1:25-cv-00279
- State of Illinois v. Federal Emergency Management Agency (D. R.I.), 1:26-cv-00485
- State of New York v. U.S. Department of Education (D. Mass),1:25-cv-11116 (joint motion to dismiss)
- State of New York v. U.S. Department of Education (S.D.N.Y.), 1:25-cv-02990, appealed to the 2nd Cir., 25-1424 (joint stipulation)

=== Executive orders 14154, 14151 and 14222, regarding impoundment of allocated energy- and environment-related funds ===
- Butterbee Farm v. United States Department of Agriculture (D.D.C.), 1:25-cv-00737
- California Infrastructure and Economic Development v. Citibank (D.D.C.), 1:25-cv-00820 (consolidated with Climate United Fund v. Citibank)
- State of Washington v. United States Department of Transportation (W.D. Wash.) 2:25-cv-00848
- Sustainability Institute v. Trump (D.S.C.), 2:25-cv-02152, appealed to the 4th Cir., 25-1575
- Woonasquatucket River Watershed Council v. Department of Agriculture (D.R.I.), 1:25-cv-00097

=== Executive order 14188 and Title VI, regarding revocation of university grants in response to alleged antisemitism ===
- American Association of University Professors v. U.S. Department of Justice (S.D.N.Y.), 1:25-cv-02429, appealed to the 2nd Cir., 25-1529
- American Association of University Professors - Harvard Faculty Chapter v. U.S. Department of Justice (D. Mass.), 1:25-cv-10910, appealed to the 1st Cir., 25-2231
- President and Fellows of Harvard College v. Department of Health and Human Services (D.Mass), 1:25-cv-11048

=== Reduction of the indirect cost reimbursement rate for research institutions ===
- Association of American Medical Colleges v. National Institutes of Health (D. Mass.), 1:25-cv-10340, appealed to the 1st Cir., 25-1344 (appeals court consolidated it with Commonwealth of Massachusetts v. National Institutes of Health, affirming the district court's permanent injunction)
- Association of American Universities v. National Science Foundation (D. Mass.), 1:25-cv-11231
- Association of American Universities v. U.S. Department of Defense (D. Mass.), 1:25-cv-11740, appealed to the 1st Cir., 25-2184
- Association of American Universities v. U.S. Department of Energy (D. Mass.), 1:25-cv-10912, appealed to the 1st Cir., 25-1727
- Association of American Universities v. U.S. Department of Health and Human Services (D. Mass.), 1:25-cv-10346, appealed to the 1st Cir., 25-1345 (appeals court consolidated it with Commonwealth of Massachusetts v. National Institutes of Health, affirming the district court's permanent injunction)
- Commonwealth of Massachusetts v. National Institutes of Health (D. Mass.), 1:25-cv-10338, appealed to the 1st Cir., 25-1343 (1st Cir. affirmed the district court's permanent injunction)

=== Temporary pause in grants, loans, and assistance ===
- American Federation of State, County & Municipal Employees, AFL-CIO v. U.S. Department of Health and Human Services (N.D. Cal.), 3:26-cv-00759
- Catholic Charities Diocese of Fort Worth, Inc. v. Department of Health and Human Services (D.D.C.), 1:25-cv-00605 (case dismissed by joint stipulation)
- Corporation for Public Broadcasting v. Federal Emergency Management Agency (D.D.C.), 1:25-cv-00740
- Inclusiv, Inc. v. U.S. Environmental Protection Agency (D.D.C.) 1:25-cv-00948
- Michigan v. Noem (D. Ore.) 6:25-cv-02053
- National Council of Nonprofits v. Office of Management and Budget (D.D.C.), 1:25-cv-00239, appealed to the D.C. Cir., 25-5148
- National Endowment for Democracy v. United States of America (D.D.C.), 1:25-cv-00648
- National Family Planning & Reproductive Health Association v. Kennedy (D.D.C.) 1:25-cv-01265
- Saint Paul, Minnesota v. Wright (D.D.C.) 1:25-cv-03899
- Shapiro v. U.S. Department of the Interior (E.D. Pa.), 2:25-cv-00763 (voluntarily dismissed by plaintiffs)
- State of California v. McMahon (D.R.I.) 1:25-cv-00329
- State of California v. U.S. Department of Agriculture (N.D. Cal.) 3:25-cv-06310
- State of California v. U.S. Department of Health and Human Services (D. Mass.) 1:25-cv-12118
- State of California v. U.S. Department of Transportation (D. R.I.), 1:25-cv-00208, appealed to the 1st Cir., 26-1026 (appeal voluntarily dismissed by defendants)
- State of Illinois v. Federal Emergency Management Agency (D. R.I.), 1:25-cv-00206
- State of Illinois v. Noem (D.R.I.) 1:25-cv-00495
- State of New Jersey v. Department of Justice (D.R.I.) 1:25-cv-00404
- State of New Jersey v. United States Department of Transportation (S.D.N.Y.) 1:26-cv-00939
- State of New York v. Administration for Children and Families (S.D.N.Y.) 1:26-cv-00172
- State of New York v. Department of Energy (D. Ore) 6:25-cv-01458
- State of New York v. National Science Foundation (S.D.N.Y.) 1:25-cv-04452
- State of New York v. Noem (S.D.N.Y.) 1:25-cv-08106
- State of New York v. Rollins (D. Ore.) 6:25-cv-02186
- State of New York v. Trump (D. R.I.), 1:25-cv-00039, appealed to the First Circuit, 25-1236
- State of New York v. U.S. Department of Justice (D.R.I) 1:25-cv-00345
- State of New York v. U.S. Department of Justice (D.R.I.) 1:25-cv-00499
- State of Washington v. U.S. Department of Housing and Urban Development (D.R.I.) 1:25-cv-00626
- Metropolitan Transportation Authority v. United States (Fed. Cl.) 1:26-cv-00422
- Illinois v. Department of Housing and Urban Development (N.D. Cal.) 1:26-cv-02262
- Minnesota v. United States Department of Agriculture (D. Minn.) 0:25-cv-04767
- Massachusetts v. United States Department of Agriculture (D. Mass.) 1:26-cv-11396
- National Alliance to End Homelessness v. United States Department of Housing and Urban Development (D.R.I.) 1:25-cv-00636
- Minnesota v. Oz (D. Minn.) 0:26-cv-01701
- Harris County, Texas v. Department of Health and Human Services (D.D.C.) 1:25-cv-01058
- California v. United States Department of Education (N.D. Cal.) 3:26-cv-05549

=== Termination of grants ===
- American Association of Physics Teachers v. National Science Foundation (D.D.C.), 1:25-cv-01923
- American Association of University Professors v. Trump (N.D. Cal.) 3:25-cv-07864, appealed to the 9th Cir., 26-0263
- American Bar Association v. U.S. Department of Justice (D.D.C.), 1:25-cv-01263
- Child Trends, Incorporated v. U.S. Department of Education (D. Md.), 8:25-cv-01154
- City of Chicago v. U.S. Department of Homeland Security (N.D. Ill.), 1:25-cv-05462
- City of Chicago v. U.S. Department of Homeland Security (N.D. Ill.), 1:25-cv-05463
- Shapiro v. U.S. Department of Agriculture (M.D.Pa.), 1:25-cv-00998
- State of Colorado v. Trump (D. Colo.) 1:25-cv-03428
- State of Colorado v. U.S. Department of Health and Human Services (D.R.I.), 1:25-cv-00121
- State of Washington v. U.S. Department of Education (W.D. Wash.) 2:25-cv-01228
- Thakur v. Trump (N.D.Cal.), 3:25-cv-04737, appealed to the 9th Cir., 24-4249
- VERA Institute of Justice v. U.S. Department of Justice (D.D.C.), 1:25-cv-01643, appealed to the D.C. Cir., 25-5248
- Right to Be v. Bondi (D.D.C.) 1:25-cv-03248
- State of Washington v. FEMA (D. Mass.) 1:25-cv-12006
- Illinois v. Vought (N.D. Ill.) 1:26-cv-01566
- Urban Sustainability Directors Network v. U.S. Department of Agriculture (D.D.C.) 1:25-cv-01775
- California v. Wright (N.D. Cal.) 3:26-cv-01417
- New Jersey v. Office of Management and Budget (D. Mass.) 1:25-cv-11816
- Hennepin County, Minnesota v. Department of Health and Human Services (D.D.C.) 1:26-cv-02460

=== Education ===
- American Association of Nurse Practitioners v. McMahon (D.D.C.) 1:26-cv-01780
- Maryland v. Department of Education (D. Md.) 1:26-cv-01957

==== Loan Forgiveness ====
- Massachusetts v. U.S. Department of Education (D. Mass.) 1:25-CV-13244
- National Council of Nonprofits v. McMahon (D. Mass.) 1:25-cv-13242

== Gun control ==
- State of New Jersey v. Bondi (D. Md.), 1:25-cv-01807

== Health ==
- American Academy of Pediatrics v. Kennedy (D. Mass.) 1:25-cv-11916
- City of Columbus v. Kennedy (D. Md.) 1:25-cv-02114, appealed to the 4th Cir., 25-2012
- Commonwealth of Massachusetts v. Oz (D. Mass.), 1:26-cv-12962
- The Family Planning Association of Maine v. U.S. Department of Health and Human Services (D. Me.) 1:25-cv-00364, appealed to the 1st Cir., 25-1829
- Planned Parenthood Federation of America, Inc. v. Kennedy (D. Mass.) 1:25-cv-11913
- Planned Parenthood of Greater New York v. U.S. Department of Health and Human Services (D.D.C.), 1:25-cv-01334, appealed to the D.C. Cir., 25-5238 (voluntarily dismissed by the plaintiffs, and a related case―1:25-cv-02453―was filed by a subset of the plaintiffs)
- Planned Parenthood of Greater New York v. U.S. Department of Health and Human Services (D.D.C.), 1:25-cv-02453
- State of California v. Centers for Medicare and Medicaid Services (D. Mass.), 1:25-cv-12019
- State of California v. U.S. Department of Health and Human Services (D. Mass.), 1:25-cv-12118, appealed to the 1st Cir., 25-2165
- California v. Zeldin (N.D. Cal.) 3:26-cv-03500
- Smart Approaches to Marijuana v. Kennedy (D.D.C.) 1:26-cv-01081
- Minority Veterans of America v. Secretary of Veterans Affairs (Fed. Cir.) 26-1861

== Immigration, detention, deportation and citizenship ==
- Dorcas International Institute of Rhode Island v. USCIS (D.R.I.) 1:26-cv-00132
- Hernandez v. Noem (D.D.C.) 1:25-cv-02344

=== Actions at immigration proceedings ===
- African Communities Together v. Lyons (S.D.N.Y.) 1:25-cv-06366
- Immigrant Advocates Response Collaborative v. Department of Justice (D.D.C.) 1:25-cv-02279
- A.M. v. DHS (S.D. Cal.) 3:25-cv-02308
- Pablo Sequen v. Kaiser (N.D. Cal.) 5:25-cv-06487

=== Actions at schools ===
- Fridley Independent School District 14 v. Noem (D. Minn.) 0:26-cv-01023

=== Actions related to unaccompanied minors ===
- Angelica S. v. Department Of Health And Human Services, 1:25-cv-01405
- Community Legal Services in East Palo Alto v. U.S. Department of Health and Human Services (N.D. Ca.), 3:25-cv-02847, appealed to the 9th Cir., 25-2358 and 25-2808
- L.G.M.L. v. Kristi Noem (D.D.C.) 1:25-cv-02942
- N. v. U.S. Department of Health and Human Services (D.D.C.) 1:26-cv-00577

=== Adjustment of status ===
- A. v. Noem (D. Mass.) 3:26-cv-30031
- U.H.A. v. Bondi (D. Minn.) 0:26-cv-00417

=== Asylum ===
- Al Otro Lado v. Kelly 3:17-cv-02366 (S.D. Cal.), appealed to the 9th Cir. as Al Otro Lado v. Kristi Noem 22-55988, and the Supreme Court as Noem v. Al Otro Lado 25-5.
- Iranian American Legal Defense Fund v. Rubio (D.D.C.), 1:26-cv-02375
- RAICES v. Markwayne Mullin (D.D.C) 1:25-cv-00306, appealed to the DC circuit 25-5243

=== Biometric information ===
- Coalition for Humane Immigrant Rights v. Department of Homeland Security ( D.D.C.), 1:25-cv-00943, appealed to the D.C. Cir., 25-5152
- Z. v. Department of Homeland Security (D.D.C.) 1:26-cv-01510

=== Board of Immigration Appeals ===
- Amica Center for Immigrant Rights v. Executive Office for Immigration Review (D.D.C.) 1:26-cv-00696

=== Bond ===
- Lazaro Maldonado Bautista v. Ernesto Santacruz Jr (C.D. Cal.) 5:25-cv-01873
- Buenrostro Mendez v. Bondi (S.D. Tex.) 4:25-cv-03726 appealed to 5th Cir. 25-20496
- Guerrero Orellana v. Moniz (D. Mass.) 1:25-cv-12664
- Joaquin Avila v. Pamela Bondi (D. Minn.) 0:25-cv-03741, appealed to the 8th Cir., 25-3248

=== Closure of oversight offices ===
- Robert F. Kennedy Human Rights v. U.S. Department of Homeland Security (D.D.C.), 1:25-cv-01270

=== Tech researchers and online safety workers visas ===
- Coalition for Independent Technology Research v. Rubio (D.D.C.) 1:26-cv-00815

=== Department of Homeland Security revocation of temporary protected status ===
Temporary protected status (TPS)
Case	Challenges termination for	Filed	
African Communities Together v. Noem (D. Mass.) 1:26-cv-10278, appealed to First Circuit 26-01376	Ethiopia	March 9, 2026	termination postponed by Brian E. Murphy
African Communities Together v. Noem (D. Mass.) 1:26-cv-11201	Somalia	March 9, 2026	administrative stay of termination granted by Allison D. Burroughs
Doe v. Noem (N.D. Ill.) 1:25-cv-15483, appealed to Seventh Circuit 26-01294	Myanmar	December 19, 2025	termination postponed by Matthew Kennelly
Lesly Miot v. Trump (D.D.C.) 1:25-cv-02471, appealed to D.C. Cir. 26-5050, appealed to Supreme Court 25-1084	Haiti	July 30, 2025	judicial review of TPS blocked by Supreme Court
African Communities Together v. Noem (D. Mass.) 1:25-cv-13939	South Sudan	December 22, 2025	administrative stay of termination granted by Angel Kelley
Mullin v. Doe (S.D.N.Y.) 1:25-cv-08686, appealed to 2nd Cir., 25-2995, appealed to Supreme Court, Noem v. Doe, 25-1083	Syria	October 20, 2025	judicial review of TPS blocked by Supreme Court
National TPS Alliance v. Noem (N.D. Cal.), 3:25-cv-05687, appealed to 9th Cir., 25-4901 and 26-199	Honduras; Nepal; Nicaragua	July 7, 2025	termination vacated by Trina Thompson Thompson's ruling stayed by Michael Daly Hawkins, Consuelo Callahan and Eric D. Miller
National TPS Alliance v. Noem (N.D. Cal.), 3:25-cv-01766, appealed to 9th Cir., 25-2120, appealed to the Supreme Court (shadow docket), Noem v. National TPS Alliance, 24A1059 and 25A326	Haiti; Venezuela	February 19, 2025	Kim McLane Wardlaw, Salvador Mendoza Jr. and Anthony Johnstone affirmed summary judgment by Edward M. Chen for TPS recipients. However, Chen's judgment will remain stayed by the Supreme Court's shadow docket.
Haitian Evangelical Clergy Association v. Trump (E.D.N.Y.) 1:25-cv-01464, appealed to the 2nd Circuit 25-02372	Haiti	March 14, 2025	termination blocked by Brian Cogan
Haitian Americans United Inc. v. Trump (D. Mass.), 1:25-cv-10498	Haiti; Venezuela	March 3, 2025	
CASA, Inc. v. Noem (D. Md.), 8:25-cv-00525	Venezuela	February 20, 2025	
Doe v. Noem (S.D.N.Y.) 1:26-cv-02103	Yemen	March 14, 2026	termination postponed by Dale Ho
CASA v. Noem (D. Md.) 8:25-cv-01484, appealed to Fourth Circuit 25-01792	Afghanistan; Cameroon	May 7, 2025	
Doe v. Noem (S.D.N.Y.) 1:26-cv-02280	Yemen	March 19, 2026	

=== Deportation of the family of an alleged hate-crime perpetrator ===
- Dvortsin v. Noem (D. Tex.), 5:25-cv-00664 (transferred from D. Colo., 1:25-cv-01741)

=== Deportation to imprisonment in El Salvador's Terrorism Confinement Center ===
Robert F. Kennedy Human Rights v. Department of State (D.D.C.), 1:25-cv-01774

=== Deportation to a third country and torture prohibition ===
- D.V.D. v. U.S. Department of Homeland Security (D. Mass.), 1:25-cv-10676, appealed to the First Circuit, 25-1311 and 1393, appealed to the Supreme Court as Department of Homeland Security v. D.V.D. (on application of stay) and Department of Homeland Security v. D.V.D. (on motion for clarification), 24A1153
- Quintero Chacon v. Dickerson (also known as E.D.Q.C. v. Stewart Detention Facility) (M.D. Georgia), 4:25-cv-00050
- Martinez Moncada v. Bondi (S.D. Fla.) 1:26-cv-21625
- U.T. v. Blanche (D.D.C.) 1:20-cv-00116

=== Detention and removal of a U.S. citizen child in connection with deportation of non-citizen family members ===
- V.M.L. v. Harper (W.D. La.), 1:25-cv-0055 (voluntarily dismissed)

=== Detention centers ===
==== 26 Federal Plaza ====
- Barco Mercado v. Noem (S.D.N.Y.) 1:25-cv-06568

==== Alligator Alcatraz ====
- C.M. v. Noem (S.D. Fla.) 1:25-cv-23182

==== Broadview ====
- Village of Broadview v. DHS 1:25-cv-12164 (N.D. Ill.)
- Moreno Gonzalez v. Noem (N.D. Ill.) 1:25-cv-13323

==== California City ====
- Gomez Ruiz v. ICE (N.D. Cal.) 3:25-cv-09757

==== Camp East Montana ====
- Angye v. ICE (W.D. Tex.) 3:26-cv-01515

=== Employment ===
- Doe v. USCIS (D.D.C.) 1:26-cv-01336
- Service Employees International Union v. Scott (D. Mass.) 1:26-cv-11251

=== Executive Order 14159 ===
==== Access of lawyers to immigrants in detention ====
- Amica Center for Immigrant Rights v. U.S. Department of Justice (D.D.C.), 1:25-cv-00298

==== Expedited removal ====
- Make the Road New York v. Noem (D.D.C.), 1:25-cv-00190, appealed to D.C. Circuit 25-5320

==== Funding freeze for immigration services ====
- Solutions In Hometown Connections v. Noem (D. Md.), 8:25-cv-00885

==== Sanctuary cities ====
- City and County of San Francisco v. Donald J. Trump (N.D. Cal.), 3:25-cv-01350
- City of Chelsea v. Trump (D. Mass.), 1:25-cv-10442
- Organized Communities Against Deportations v. Donald Trump (N.D.Ill.), 1:25-cv-00868 (case dismissed without prejudice)
- Pineros y Campesinos Unidos Del Noreste v. Noem (D. Ore.), 6:25-cv-00699
- United States v. City of Newark (D.N.J.), 2:25-cv-05081

=== Executive order 14160, pertaining to birthright citizenship ===
On January 20, 2025, Donald Trump signed Executive Order 14160, which seeks to revoke birthright citizenship for children of undocumented immigrants. The executive order argues that the children of undocumented immigrants are not “subject to the jurisdiction” of the US.

==== New Hampshire Indonesian Community Support v. Donald J. Trump (D.N.H.) Case No. 1:25-cv-00038 ====
On January 20, 2025, the American Civil Liberties Union sued the Trump Administration, citing the 14th Amendment and U.S. v. Wong Kim Ark (1898) as affirming birthright citizenship, on behalf of New Hampshire Indonesian Community, the League of United Latin American Citizens, and Make the Road Work.

On February 10, 2025, Judge Joseph N. Laplante of the United States District Court for the District of New Hampshire issued a preliminary injunction.

==== O. Doe; Brazilian Worker Center, Inc; La Colaborativa v. Donald J. Trump et al (D. Mass.) Case No. 1:25-cv-10135-LTS ====
In Massachusetts, a plaintiff, going by "O. Doe", along with a group of pregnant women whose children would not receive citizenship, if birthright citizenship were to be rescinded due to Executive Order 14160, sued Donald J. Trump et al., citing the 14th Amendment and U.S. v. Wong Kim Ark (1898).

On February 13, 2025 Judge Leo T. Sorokin of the District Court of Massachusetts issued a preliminary injunction blocking enforcement of the Executive Order.

==== Case list ====
- Barbara v. Trump (D.N.H.), 1:25-cv-00244, appealed to the Supreme Court, Trump v. Barbara, 25-365
- CASA Inc. v. Trump (D. Md.), 8:25-cv-00201-DLB, appealed to the 4th Cir., 25-1153, appealed to the Supreme Court, Trump v. Casa Inc., 24A884
- County of Santa Clara v. Trump (N.D. Cal.), 5:25-cv-00981
- Doe v. Trump (D. Mass.), 1:25-cv-10135-LTS, appealed to the 1st Cir., 25-1169 (consolidated with State of New Jersey v. Trump, 25-1170, at the appellate level)
- Franco Aleman v. Trump (W.D. Wash.), 2:25-cv-00163-JCC (consolidated with State of Washington v. Trump in the district court)
- Le v. Trump (C.D. Cal.), 8:25-cv-00104
- New Hampshire Indonesian Community Support v. Trump (D.N.H.), 1:25-cv-00038, appealed to the 1st Cir., 25-1348
- New York Immigration Coalition v. Trump (S.D.N.Y.), 1:25-cv-01309
- OCA–Asian Pacific American Advocates v. Rubio (D.D.C.), 1:25-cv-00287
- State of New Jersey v. Trump (D. Mass.), 1:25-cv-10139, appealed to the 1st Cir., 25-1158, 25-1170, 25-1200, and 25-1898, appealed to the Supreme Court, Trump v. State of New Jersey, 24A886
- State of Washington v. Trump (W.D. Wash.), 2:25-cv-00127-JCC, appealed to the 9th Cir., 25-674 and 25-807, appealed to the Supreme Court, Trump v. State of Washington, 24A885

Note: the Supreme Court consolidated Trump v. Casa Inc., Trump v. State of New Jersey, and Trump v. State of Washington.

=== Executive orders 14161 and 14188, pertaining to speech-related revocation of green cards and visas ===
- American Association of University Professors v. Rubio (D. Mass), 1:25-cv-10685
- Chung v. Trump (S.D.N.Y.), 1:25-cv-02412
- Khalil v. Joyce (D.N.J.), 2:25-cv-01963 (formerly S.D.N.Y. case number 1:25-cv-01935), appealed to the 3rd Circuit, 25-2162 and 25-2357 (these two appeals were consolidated) and 25-8019
- Mahdawi v. Trump (D. Vt.), 2:25-cv-00389, appealed to the 2nd Cir., 25-1113
- Ozturk v. Hyde (D. Vt.), 2:25-cv-00374 (formerly D. Mass. case number 1:25-cv-10695), appealed to the 2nd Cir., 25-1019
- President and Fellows of Harvard College v. Department of Homeland Security (D. Mass), 1:25-cv-11472, appealed to the 1st Circuit, 25-1627
- Suri v. Trump (E.D. VA), 1:25-cv-00480, appealed to the 4th Cir., 25-1560
- Taal v. Trump (N.D.N.Y.), 3:25-cv-00335 (case closed after petitioner self-deported)
- Vizguerra-Ramirez v. Choate (D. Colo.), 25-cv-00881
- Stanford Daily Publishing Corporation v. Rubio (N.D. Cal.) 5:25-cv-06618

=== Executive order 14163, pertaining to suspension of the US refugee admissions program ===
- Pacito v. Trump (W.D. Wash), 2:25-cv-00255, appeals to the 9th Cir., 25-1313 and 25-1939
- United States Conference of Catholic Bishops v. U.S. Department of State (D.D.C.), 1:25-cv-00465

=== Executive order 14165 ===
==== Pertaining to the discontinuation of CBP One app ====
- Las Americas Immigrant Advocacy Center v. U.S. Department of Homeland Security (D.D.C.), 1:24-cv-01702
- Doe v. DHS (D. Mass.) 1:25-cv-12245

==== Pertaining to the IRS data sharing for immigration enforcement purposes ====
- Centro de Trabajadores Unidos v. Bessent (D.D.C.), 1:25-cv-00677, appealed to the DC Cir., 25-5181

=== Executive Order 14165, pertaining to the termination of categorical parole programs ===
- Doe v. Noem (D. Mass.), 1:25-cv-10495, appealed to the 1st Cir., 25-1384, appealed to the Supreme Court, Noem v. Doe, 24A1079

=== Fines ===
- Maria L. v. Noem (D. Mass.) 1:25-cv-13471

=== H-1B visa ===
- Chamber of Commerce of the United States of America v. DHS (D.D.C.) 1:25-cv-03675
- Global Nurse Force v. Trump (N.D. Cal.) 4:25-cv-08454
- California v. Noem (D. Mass.) 1:25-cv-13829

=== Habeas corpus ===
Over 55,000 habeas corpus petitions have been filed.

=== Health data ===
- California v. Department of Health and Human Services (N.D. Cal.) 3:25-cv-05536
- National Health Law Program v. Department of Health and Human Services (D.D.C.) 1:26-cv-01200

=== Memorandum pertaining to immigration enforcement against places of worship and schools ===
- Denver Public Schools v. Noem (D. Colo.), 1:25-cv-00474, case dismissed after plaintiffs dismissed their claims
- Fridley Public School District, Independent School District 14 v. Noem (D. Minn.), 0:26-cv-01023
- Mennonite Church USA v. U.S. Department of Homeland Security (D.D.C.), 1:25-cv-00403, appealed to the D.C. Cir., 25-5209
- New England Synod, Evangelical Lutheran Church in America v. Department of Homeland Security (D. Mass.), 4:25-cv-40102
- Philadelphia Yearly Meeting of the Religious Society of Friends v. U.S. Department of Homeland Security (D. Md.), 8:25-cv-00243, appealed to the 4th Cir., 25-1512

=== Memorandum pertaining to migrant transfers to Guantanamo ===
- Espinoza Escalona v. Noem (D.D.C.), 1:25-cv-00604 (voluntarily dismissed)
- Las Americas Immigrant Advocacy Center v. Noem (D.D.C.), 1:25-cv-00418
- Perez Parra v. Castro (D. N.M.), 1:24-cv-00912 (case dismissed after the petitioners were deported)
- Luna Gutierrez v. Noem (D.D.C.) 1:25-cv-01766

=== Observers' and protesters' rights ===
- Tincher v. Noem (D. Minn.), 0:25-cv-04669
- Dickinson v. Trump (D. Or.), 3:25-cv-02170
- Joe Neguse v. ICE (D.D.C.) 1:25-cv-02463, appealed to the D.C. Circuit 26-5072
- The Advocates For Human Rights v. Bondi (D.D.C.) 1:26-cv-00865
- San Diego v. Department of Homeland Security (S.D. Cal.) 3:26-cv-01520

=== Operations ===
==== Actions in California ====
- Noem v. Vasquez Perdomo (C.D. Cal.) 2:25-cv-05605
- United Farm Workers v. Noem (E.D. Cal.), 1:25-cv-00246

==== Metro Surge ====
- Advocates for Human Rights v. Noem (D. Minn.) 0:26-cv-00749
- Minneapolis Area Synod of the Evangelical Lutheran Church in America v. U.S. Department of Homeland Security (D. Minn.) 0:26-cv-01576
- Minnesota v. US Department of Justice

=== Proclamation 10888, prohibiting non-citizens from invoking asylum provisions ===
- Refugee and Immigrant Center for Education and Legal Services v. Noem (D.D.C.), 1:25-cv-00306

=== Proclamation 10903, pertaining to the Alien Enemies Act ===
J.G.G. v. Trump (D.D.C.) is a class action and habeas corpus lawsuit brought by five Venezuelan men in immigration custody, contesting Trump's invocation of the Alien Enemies Act (AEA) in presidential proclamation 10903 and the attempt to deport Venezuelan citizens in the US who are alleged to be members of the criminal organization Tren de Aragua. The district court judge granted temporary restraining order for the five plaintiffs and then, after certifying the class, granted another temporary restraining order for the class. The Trump administration appealed to the U.S. Court of Appeals for the District of Columbia, which denied the appeal, and then to the Supreme Court, which vacated the temporary restraining orders, stating that any challenges to removal under the AEA must be brought as a habeas corpus petitions, which requires that the petition be filed in the district where a petitioner is detained, and since the petitioners were detained in Texas, their petition in the District of Columbia had been filed in the wrong jurisdiction. The court did not reach whether the use of the AEA to deport the men was constitutional, nor whether it applied to the plaintiffs. It added that the government had to give anyone it sought to deport under the AEA enough notice that they could file habeas complaints challenging their removal. Related cases were then filed in other districts.

- Agelviz-Sanguino v. Noem (S.D. Tex.), 4:25-cv-02116, appealed to the Fifth Circuit, 25-20203 (voluntary dismissal)
- A.S.R. v. Trump (W.D. Pa.), 3:25-cv-00113
- Darwin Antonio Arevalo Millan v. Trump (C.D. Ca.), 5:25-cv-01207
- D.B.U. v. Trump (D. Colo.), 1:25-cv-01163
- G.F.F. v. Trump (S.D.N.Y.), 1:25-cv-02886
- J.A.V. v. Trump (S.D. Tex.), 1:25-cv-00072, appealed to the 5th Cir., 25-40400
- J.G.G. v. Trump (D.D.C.), 1:25-cv-00766, appealed to the D.C. Cir., 25-5067 and 25-5068 (cases consolidated and voluntarily dismissed after Supreme Court ruling), and Trump v. J.G.G. (Supreme Court), 24A931; second appeal to the D.C. Cir., 25-5124, third appeal to the D.C. Cir., 25-5217, fourth appeal to the D.C. Cir., 25-5452
- J.O.P. v. U.S. Department of Homeland Security (D. Md.), 8:19-CV-01944, appealed to the Fourth Circuit, 25-1519
- M.A.P.S. v. Garite (W.D. Tex.), 3:25-cv-00171
- Sanchez Puentes v. Garite (W.D. Tex.), 3:25-cv-00127
- W.J.C.C. v. Trump (W.D. Pa.), 3:25-cv-00153
- W.M.M. v. Trump (N.D. Tex.), 1:25-cv-00059, appealed to the 5th Cir., A.A.R.P. v. Trump, 25-10534, and Supreme Court, 24A1007
- Y.A.P.A. v. Trump (M.D. Ga.), 4:25-cv-00144
- Zacarias Matos v. Venegas (S.D. Tex.), 1:25-cv-00057 (case dismissed without prejudice)

=== Profiling and warrantless detention of US citizen despite evidence of citizenship ===
- Venegas v. Homan (S.D. Ala.), 1:25-cv-00397

=== Removal despite "withholding of removal" status due to fear of persecution ===
- Abrego Garcia v. Noem (D. Md.), 8:25-cv-00951, first appeal to the Fourth Cir., 25-1345, and Noem v. Abrego Garcia (Supreme Court), 24A949, second appeal to the Fourth Cir.: Abrego Garcia v. Noem, 25-1404; related district court case, Abrego Garcia v. Noem (D. Md.), 8:25-cv-02780

=== Termination of F-1 student visa status ===
- Jane Doe 1 v. Bondi (N.D. Ga.), 1:25-cv-01998
- Pasula v. Department of Homeland Security, (D.N.H.), 1:25-cv-00156

In addition to this class action suit, there are over 100 other suits.

=== Travel restrictions ===
- Catholic Legal Immigration Network, Inc. v. Rubio (S.D.N.Y.) 1:26-cv-00858
- Doe v. Department of State (D.D.C.) 1:26-cv-01270
- Doe v. Trump 1:25-cv-13946
- Thein v. Trump (D.D.C.) 1:25-cv-02369

=== Warrants ===
- Ramirez Ovando v. Noem (D. Colo.) 1:25-cv-03183
- Escobar Molina v. DHS (D.D.C.) 1:25-cv-03417
- M-J-M-A v. Wamsley (D. Ore.) 6:25-cv-02011
- Greater Boston Latino Network v. Noem (D. Mass.) 1:26-cv-10472
- Castañon Nava v. DHS (N.D. Ill.) 1:18-cv-03757
- Peralta v. Department of Homeland Security (S.D. Ohio) 2:26-cv-00337
- Benitez v. Department of Homeland Security (E.D.N.Y.) 2:26-cv-02082
- Gibson Brown v. Mullin (D.D.C.) 1:26-cv-01131

== International ==
=== Boat strikes ===
- Burnley v. United States (D. Mass.), 1:26-cv-10364

=== Foreign aid ===
==== Ending agreements between the Bureau of International Labor Affairs and nonprofits ====
- American Center for International Labor Solidarity v. Chavez-Deremer (D.D.C.), 1:25-cv-01128

==== Executive order 14169 ====
- AIDS Vaccine Advocacy Coalition v. U.S. Department of State (D.D.C.), 1:25-cv-00400, appealed to the D.C. Cir., 25-5046 and 25-5098, appealed to the Supreme Court, Department of State v. AIDS Vaccine Advocacy Coalition, 24A831
- American Federation of Government Employees v. Trump (D.D.C.), 1:25-cv-00352
- Global Health Council v. Trump (D.D.C.), 1:25-cv-00402
- Personal Services Contractor Association v. Trump (D.D.C.), 1:25-cv-00469

=== Executive order 14203, pertaining to the International Criminal Court ===
- Iverson v. Trump (D.D.C.), 1:25-cv-01353 (voluntarily dismissed)
- L.C. v. Trump (D.D.C.) 1:26-cv-00688, appealed to the D.C. Cir., 26-5172
- Rona v. Trump (S.D.N.Y.), 1:25-cv-03114
- Smith v. Trump (D. Me.), 1:25-cv-00158
- Prost v. Trump (S.D.N.Y.) 1:26-cv-05305
- Democracy for the Arab World Now, Inc. v. Trump (S.D.N.Y.) 1:26-cv-05957

=== Tariffs ===
Case name	Date filed	Case summary	Outcome
Emily Ley Paper, Inc. v Trump (N.D. Fla.), 3:25-cv-00464	April 3, 2025	A Florida business that imports goods from China filed suit challenging President Trump's 2025 tariffs on imports from China.	Ongoing
V.O.S. Selections, Inc. v. Trump (U.S. Court of International Trade), 1:25-cv-00066, appealed to the Federal Cir., 25-1812	April 14, 2025	Five small businesses and several states filed suit challenging President Trump's use of the International Emergency Economic Powers Act (IEEPA) to impose tariffs. Was consolidated into Learning Resources Inc. v. Trump upon appeal to the U.S. Supreme Court.	On February 20, 2026, in a 6-3 decision, the Supreme Court ruled that the IEEPA does not give the President the power to set tariffs.
Learning Resources, Inc. v. Trump (D.D.C.), 1:25-cv-01248 appealed to the Federal Cir., 24-1287	April 22, 2025	Two educational toy companies filed suit challenging use of the International Emergency Economic Powers Act (IEEPA) to impose tariffs. See also: Learning Resources, Inc. v. Trump	On February 20, 2026, in a 6-3 decision, the Supreme Court ruled that the IEEPA does not give the President the power to set tariffs.
State of California v. Trump (N.D. Ca.), 3:25-cv-03372 appealed to the 9th Cir., 25-3493	April 16, 2025	California and Gavin Newsom acting his capacity as Governor filed suit against Trump's use of the IEEPA.	Ongoing
State of Oregon v. Trump (U.S. Court of International Trade), 1:25-cv-00077, appealed to the Federal Cir., 25-1813	April 23, 2025	Twelve states (Oregon, Arizona, Colorado, Connecticut, Delaware, Illinois, Maine, Minnesota, Nevada, New Mexico, New York and Vermont) sued contesting Trump's use of the IEEPA to levy tariffs.	consolidated with V.O.S. Selections, Inc. v. Trump
Webber v. U.S. Department of Homeland Security (D. Mont.), 4:25-cv-00026	April 4, 2025	Two members of the Blackfeet Nation of Montana filed suit against the Department of Homeland Security and Kristi Noem over the use of IEEPA to impose tariffs and the lack of exceptions for indigenous trade.	Ongoing
Costco v. United States (Ct. Int'l Trade) 1:25-cv-00316	November 28, 2025	The warehouse chain Costco sued the government over its imposition of tariffs and requested the US refund them for all IEEPA duties collected.	Ongoing
Federal Express Corporation v. United States (Ct. Int'l Trade) 1:26-cv-01150	February 23, 2026		
Oregon v. Trump (Ct. Int'l Trade) 1:26-cv-01472, appealed to the Federal Circuit 26-1804	March 5, 2026		
Nintendo of America Inc. v. U.S. Department of the Treasury (Ct. Int'l Trade) 1:26-cv-1540	March 6, 2026		
Burlap and Barrel, Inc. v. Greer (Ct. Int'l Trade), 1:26-cv-03345	July 24, 2026	Two businesses sued the administration to stop tariffs implemented under Section 301 of the Trade Act of 1974.	Ongoing

== Transportation ==
=== Congestion Pricing ===
- Metropolitan Transportation Authority v. Duffy (S.D.N.Y.), 1:25-cv-01413

== See also ==
- Legal affairs of the first Trump presidency
- List of significant shadow docket decisions made by the United States Supreme Court
