= Cover (intelligence gathering) =

Ostensible identity in an infiltrated organization assumed by a covert agent

A cover in foreign, military or police human intelligence or counterintelligence is the ostensible identity and role or position in an infiltrated organization assumed by a covert agent during a covert operation.

== Official cover ==
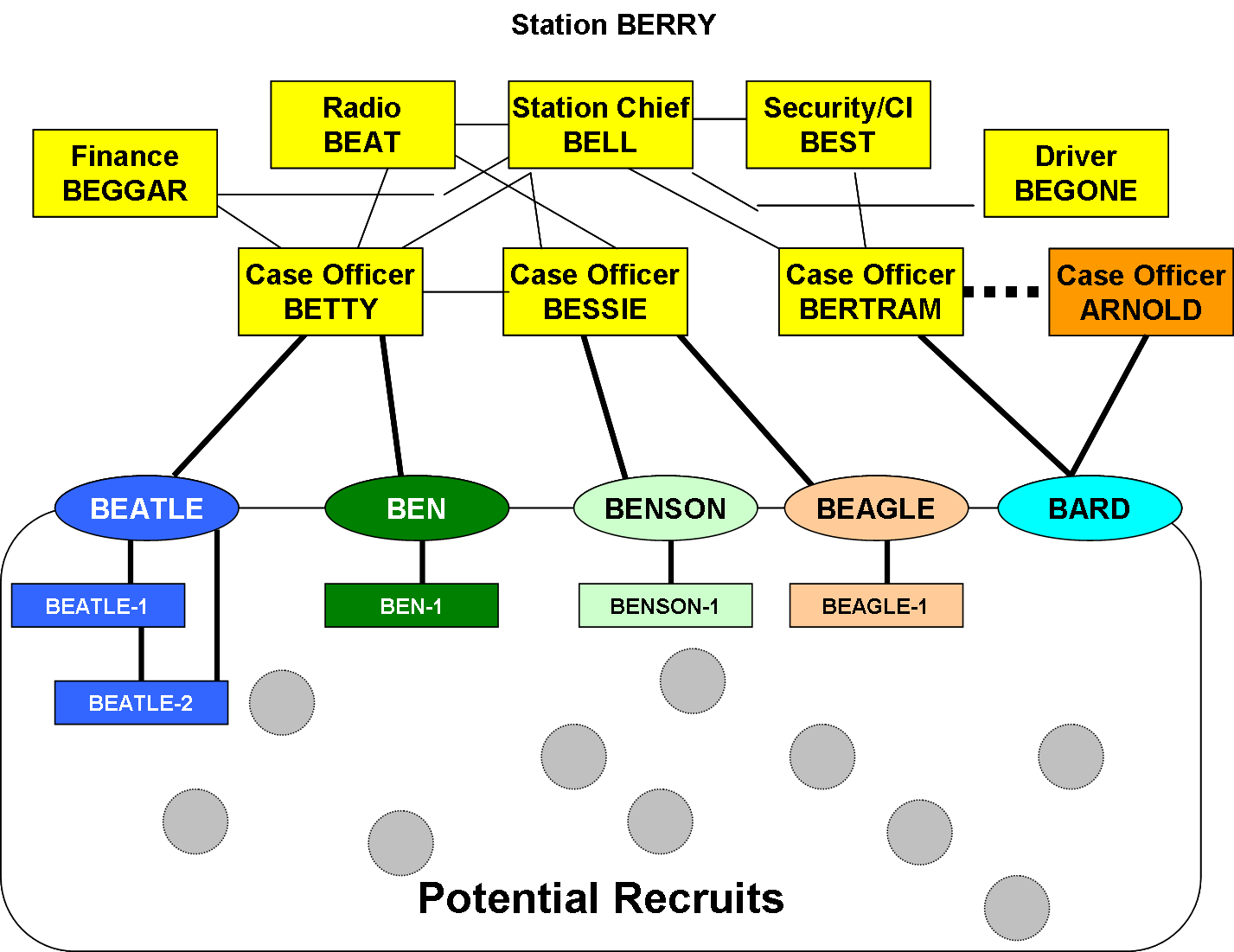
Representative clandestine operations run from diplomatic cover

In espionage, an official cover operative is one who assumes a position in an organization with diplomatic ties to the government for which the operative works such as an embassy or consulate. This provides the agent with official diplomatic immunity, thus protecting them from the severe punishments normally meted out to captured spies. Upon discovery of an official cover agent's secret hostile role, the host nation often declares the agent persona non grata and orders them to leave the country.

Official cover operatives are granted a set of governmental protections, and if caught in the act of espionage, they can request diplomatic protection from their government. In other words, official cover operatives are agents officially recognized by their country.

== Non-official cover ==
In espionage, operatives under non-official cover (NOC) are operatives without official ties to the government for which they work who assume covert roles in organizations. Another term often used is deep cover, which the Oxford English Dictionary defines as "designating an intelligence agent whose real identity and allegiance are thoroughly protected."

This is in contrast to an operative with official cover, where they assume a position in their government, such as the diplomatic service, which provides them with diplomatic immunity if their espionage activities are discovered. Operatives under non-official cover do not have this "safety net", and if captured and charged as spies are subject to severe criminal punishments, up to and including execution. Operatives under non-official cover are also usually trained to deny any connection with their government, thus preserving plausible deniability, but also denying them any hope of diplomatic legal assistance – or official acknowledgment of their service. Such an operative or agent may be referred to as a NOC (pronounced /nɒk/ NOK) or as an illegal (see Clandestine HUMINT operational techniques). Sometimes, front companies or strawman entities are established in order to provide false identities for agents.

== History ==
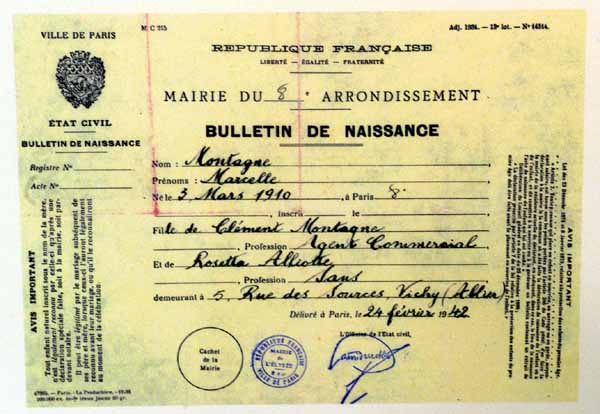
Fake birth certificate used by Virginia Hall during the Second World War; it gave her the alias of a Frenchwoman named Marcelle Montagne.

An agent sent to spy on a foreign country might, for instance, work as a businessperson, a worker for a non-profit organization (such as a humanitarian group), or an academic. For example, the CIA's Ishmael Jones spent nearly two decades as a NOC.

Many of the agents memorialized without names or dates of service on the CIA Memorial Wall are assumed to have been killed or executed in a foreign country while serving as NOC agents. In nations with established and well-developed spy agencies, most captured non-native NOC agents have, however, historically been repatriated through prisoner exchanges for other captured NOCs as a form of gentlemen's agreement.

Some countries have regulations regarding the use of non-official cover: the CIA, for example, has at times been prohibited from disguising agents as members of certain aid organizations, or as members of the clergy.

The degree of sophistication put into non-official cover stories varies considerably. Sometimes, an agent will simply be appointed to a position in a well-established company which can provide the appropriate opportunities. Other times, entire front companies can be established in order to provide false identities for agents.

Examples include Air America, used by the CIA during the Vietnam War, and Brewster Jennings & Associates, used by the CIA in WMD investigations and made public as a result of the Plame affair.

== Examples ==
Former MI6 officer "Nicholas Anderson" wrote an account of his service in a fictionalized autobiography (as per English law) entitled NOC: Non-Official Cover: British Secret Operations, and two sequels: NOC Twice: More UK Non-Official Cover Operations and NOC Three Times: Knock-On Effect (Last of the Trilogy).

Michael Ross, a former Mossad officer, operated as a Mossad NOC or "combatant" as described in his memoir, The Volunteer: The Incredible True Story of an Israeli Spy on the Trail of International Terrorists (Skyhorse Publishing, September 2007, ISBN 978-1-60239-132-1).

Fictional notable examples include Chuck Barris, who made a satirical claim to have been a NOC with 33 kills in his book and movie Confessions of a Dangerous Mind. Other examples are featured in the books Debt of Honor and The Eleventh Commandment; the films Mission: Impossible, Spy Game, The Bourne Identity, Safe House, and The Recruit; and the television shows The Americans, Burn Notice, Spooks, The Night Manager, Covert Affairs, The Spy, Patriot, The Agency and Slow Horses.

== See also ==
- Illegals Program
- Secret identity
- Sleeper agent
