= Patricia Tolliver Giles =

American judge (born 1973)

Patricia Giles
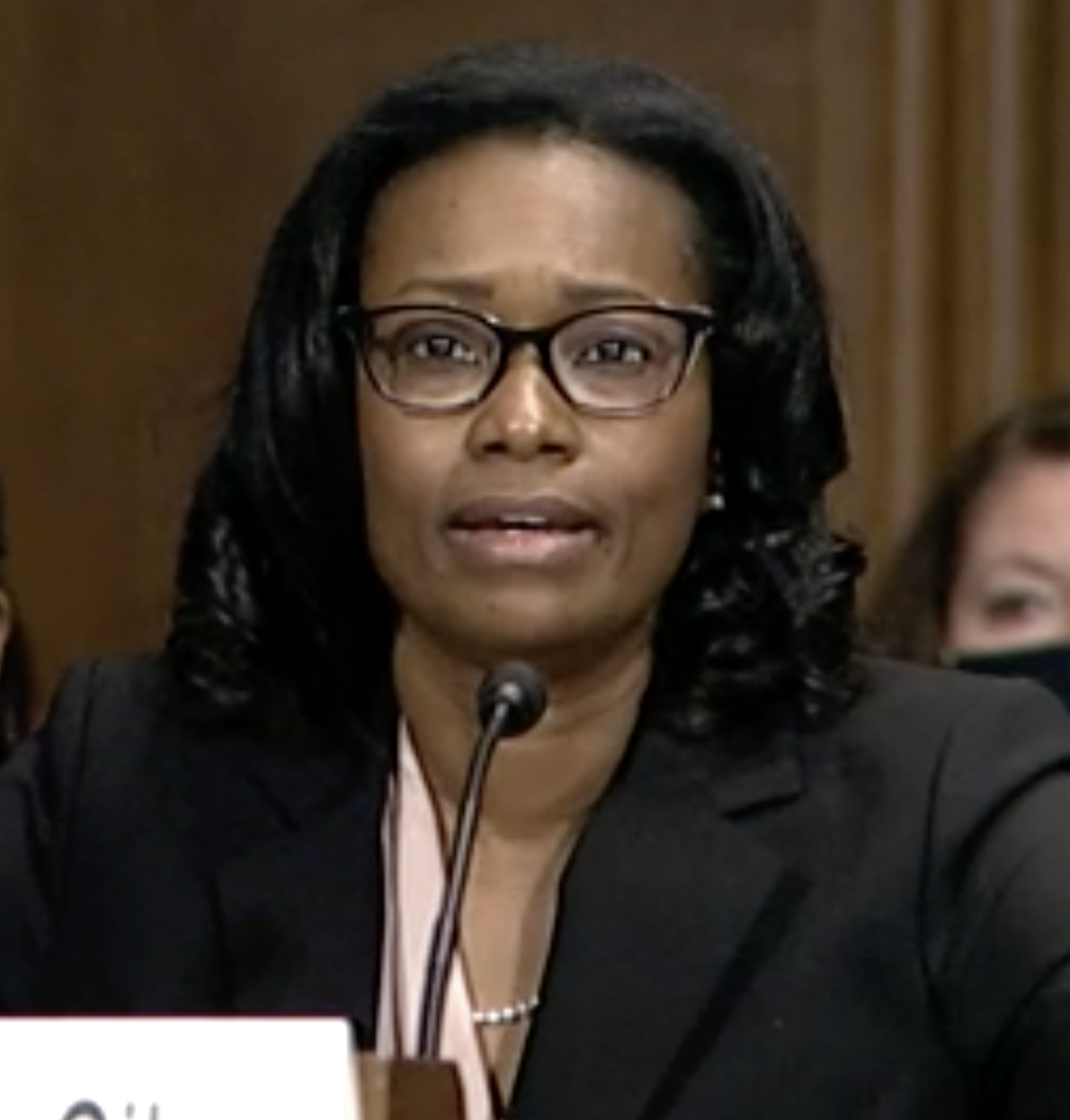

Judge of the United States District Court for the Eastern District of Virginia
- Incumbent
- Assumed office November 1, 2021
- Appointed by: Joe Biden
- Preceded by: Liam O'Grady

Personal details
- Born: Patricia Denise Tolliver; 1973 (age 52–53) West Point, New York, U.S.
- Education: University of Virginia (BA, JD)

Patricia Tolliver Giles (née Patricia Denise Tolliver; born 1973) is a United States district judge of the United States District Court for the Eastern District of Virginia. She served as an Assistant United States Attorney in the U.S. Attorney's Office for the Eastern District of Virginia from 2003 to 2021 then became a judge.

== Education ==
Giles grew up in Hampton, Virginia. Giles received her Bachelor of Arts from the University of Virginia in 1995 and her Juris Doctor from the University of Virginia School of Law in 1998.

== Career ==
After graduating law school, Giles served as a law clerk for Judge Gerald Bruce Lee of the United States District Court for the Eastern District of Virginia from 1998 to 2000. From 2000 to 2003, she was an associate at Cooley Godward LLP. Her work included commercial cases in the areas of contracts, intellectual property, securities, and employment law. From 2003 to 2019, she served as an assistant United States attorney in the Major Crimes Unit. She was with the U.S. Attorney's Office for the Eastern District of Virginia from 2003 to 2021, and served as managing assistant U.S. attorney. She also served on the Attorney General's Transnational Organized Crime Task Force MS-13 Subcommittee.

=== Federal judicial service ===
In 2017, Giles had been recommended among a list of individuals to fill the seat left vacant when Gerald Bruce Lee retired, but the Trump Administration nominated Rossie D. Alston Jr., who was confirmed. In April 2021, Senators Mark Warner and Tim Kaine recommended Giles to be a United States District Judge for the Eastern District of Virginia to the seat vacated by Judge Liam O'Grady. On June 30, 2021, President Joe Biden announced his intent to nominate Giles to serve as a United States district judge for the United States District Court for the Eastern District of Virginia. On July 13, 2021, her nomination was sent to the Senate. President Biden nominated Giles to the seat vacated by Judge Liam O'Grady, who assumed senior status on May 1, 2020. On July 28, 2021, a hearing on her nomination was held before the Senate Judiciary Committee. On September 23, 2021, her nomination was reported out of committee by a 17–5 vote. On October 26, 2021, the United States Senate invoked cloture on her nomination by a 69–29 vote. Her nomination was confirmed later that day by a 68–27 vote. She received her judicial commission on November 1, 2021.

==== Notable rulings ====
In October 2024, Giles ruled that Virginia had illegally purged alleged non-citizen registered voters from the state's voter rolls too close to the upcoming November 2024 election, and she ordered the state to restore removed voters. The next day, the United States Supreme Court issued an order staying her order pending further litigation, allowing the state to proceed with the removals.

In May 2025, Giles ordered the release of Badar Khan Suri, a postdoctoral fellow at the Alwaleed Bin Talal Center for Muslim-Christian Understanding at Georgetown's foreign service program, while he awaits an immigration court decision on his deportation order related to the Trump Administration's accusation of Suri being related to Hamas members and distributing Hamas propaganda.

== See also ==
- List of African-American federal judges
- List of African-American jurists

Legal offices
Preceded by Liam O'Grady	Judge of the United States District Court for the Eastern District of Virginia; 2021–present	Incumbent
