= E.K. v. Department of Defense Education Activity =

2025 United States District Court case

E.K et al v. Department of Defense Education Activity et al
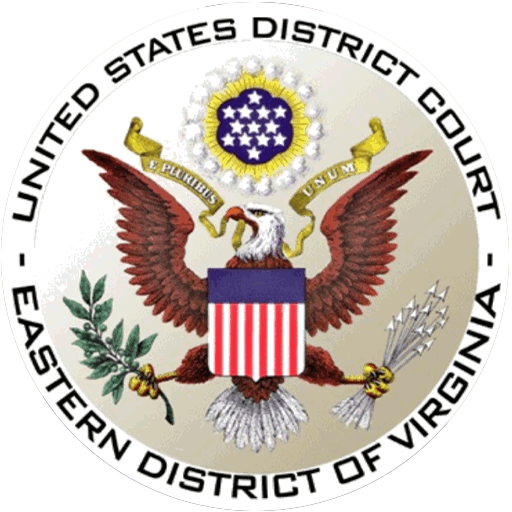
- Court: United States District Court for the Eastern District of Virginia
- Full case name: E.K. and S.K., minors, by and through their parent and next friend LINDSEY KEELEY; O.H., S.H., and H.H., minors, by and through their parent and next friend, JESSICA HENNINGER; E.G., a minor, by and through his parent and next friend MEGAN JEBELES; E.Y. and C.Y. minors, by and through their parent and next friend ANNA YOUNG; L.K., L.K., and L.K., minors, by and through their parent and next friend ANNA KENKEL; and M.T., a minor, by and through her parent NATALIE TOLLEY, v. DEPARTMENT OF DEFENSE EDUCATION ACTIVITY; DR. BETH SCHIAVINO-NARVAEZ, in her official capacity as Director of the Department of Defense Education Activity; and PETER BRIAN HEGSETH, in his official capacity as Secretary of Defense,

Court membership
- Judge sitting: Patricia Tolliver Giles

E.K. v. Department of Defense Education Activity is a case pending in the U.S District Court for the Eastern District of Virginia brought by the American Civil Liberties Union, ACLU of Virginia, and ACLU of Kentucky against the Department of Defense Education Activity (DoDEA). The complaint claims that Trump's Executive Orders 14168, 14185, and 14190 violate the First Amendment on their face and in the way they are being used by defendants. The executive orders aim to remove gender ideology, DEI, and critical race theory and aim to remove them from schools. The case specifically relates to the application in military schools of Executive Order 14190, titled "Ending Radical Indoctrination in K-12 Schooling".

== History ==
On April 15, 2025, the lawsuit was filed and claimed that multiple books based on civil rights—To Kill a Mockingbird, Fahrenheit 451, and Well-Read Black Girl—have been banned because of the executive orders. The First Amendment claims rely on the Supreme Court case Island Trees School District v. Pico (1982). The judge for the case is Patricia Tolliver Giles.

On October 20, Judge Giles granted a prelimenary injunction, ordering the removed books be reinstated and enjoining DoDEA from further book removals.
