= Liam O'Grady =

American judge (born 1950)

Judge of the United States Foreign Intelligence Surveillance Court
- In office August 21, 2020 – August 18, 2023
- Appointed by: John Roberts
- Preceded by: Michael W. Mosman
- Succeeded by: Carl J. Nichols

Senior Judge of the United States District Court for the Eastern District of Virginia
- In office May 1, 2020 – August 18, 2023

Judge of the United States District Court for the Eastern District of Virginia
- In office July 11, 2007 – May 1, 2020
- Appointed by: George W. Bush
- Preceded by: Claude M. Hilton
- Succeeded by: Patricia Tolliver Giles

Magistrate Judge of the United States District Court for the Eastern District of Virginia
- In office 2003–2007

Personal details
- Born: 1950 (age 75–76) Newark, New Jersey, U.S.
- Education: Franklin & Marshall College (BA); George Mason University (JD)

Liam O'Grady (born 1950) is a former United States district judge of the United States District Court for the Eastern District of Virginia. In 2020, he was appointed as a judge of the United States Foreign Intelligence Surveillance Court and as a judge of the Alien Terrorist Removal Court. He retired in August 2023.

== Early life and education ==
Born in Newark, New Jersey, O'Grady attended Glen Ridge High School, graduating in 1968. He received a Bachelor of Arts degree from Franklin & Marshall College in 1973 and a Juris Doctor from George Mason University School of Law in 1977.

== Career ==
O'Grady was in private practice in Virginia from 1992 to 2003. He was an Assistant commonwealth's attorney for the Commonwealth of Virginia from 1982 to 1986. He was an assistant United States attorney of the Eastern District of Virginia from 1986 to 1992.

=== Federal judicial service ===
O'Grady was a United States magistrate judge for the Eastern District of Virginia from 2003 to 2007. On January 9, 2007, O'Grady was nominated by President George W. Bush to a seat on the United States District Court for the Eastern District of Virginia vacated by Claude M. Hilton. O'Grady was confirmed by the United States Senate on July 9, 2007, and received his commission on July 11, 2007. He assumed senior status on May 1, 2020. In 2021, he was appointed to the Alien Terrorist Removal Court and as a judge of the Foreign Intelligence Surveillance Court. He retired from active service on August 18, 2023.

=== Megaupload case ===
O'Grady was the presiding judge in extradition proceedings against Kim Dotcom relating to the Megaupload file storage service. During April 2012 he stated: "I frankly don't know that we are ever going to have a trial in this matter," when he found that the company had never been formally served with criminal papers by the US.

In April 2022 O’Grady was replaced as a judge in the RIAA and MPA civil cases against Megaupload.

On May 21, 2022 O’Grady was replaced as a judge in both the criminal case against Megaupload due to conflict of interest, O'Grady had a financial stake in Disney.

=== Daniel Hale case ===
O'Grady was the presiding judge in the case against Daniel Hale. Hale is a whistleblower who leaked approximately 150 documents to a reporter on U.S. drone operations in the Middle East. The documents detailed how the policy of selecting targets was presumptuous rather than thorough; and the targeting was far from precise. In March 2021 Hale pleaded guilty to one count of providing classified information to a reporter.

During sentencing, defense attorneys argued the government had no evidence showing that actual harm had arisen from the leaks, and the fact should be taken into account. In July 2021 O'Grady sentenced Hale to 45 months in prison. It was the second harshest sentence for a whistleblower (the harshest was Reality Winner's sentence of 5 years in prison for whistleblowing).

== Sources ==
Legal offices
Preceded by Claude M. Hilton	Judge of the United States District Court for the Eastern District of Virginia; 2007–2020	Succeeded by Patricia Tolliver Giles
Preceded by Michael W. Mosman	Judge of the United States Foreign Intelligence Surveillance Court; 2020–2023	Succeeded by Carl J. Nichols
