= Gerald Bruce Lee =

American judge

Judge of the United States District Court for the Eastern District of Virginia
- In office October 1, 1998 – September 30, 2017
- Appointed by: Bill Clinton
- Preceded by: James C. Cacheris
- Succeeded by: Rossie D. Alston Jr.

Personal details
- Born: February 9, 1952 (age 74) Washington, D.C., U.S.
- Education: American University (BA, JD)

Gerald Bruce Lee (born February 9, 1952) is an American former district judge of the United States District Court for the Eastern District of Virginia.

== Education and career highlights ==
Lee was the first in his family to attend college and attended American University where he earned a Bachelor of Arts degree in 1973, and a Juris Doctor in 1976 from American University's Washington College of Law. Lee worked in private practice in Alexandria, Virginia until 1992, when he became a Circuit court judge on the 19th Judicial Circuit of Virginia, Fairfax Circuit Court. Lee was nominated to his present position as United States District Judge by President Bill Clinton on May 22, 1998, and received his commission on October 1, 1998. He retired from active service on September 30, 2017.

== Biography ==
=== As an attorney ===
Prior to ascending to the bench, Lee was a trial lawyer for fifteen years, representing individuals and businesses in civil and criminal cases in state and federal courts. He was a partner at Cohen, Dunn & Sinclair, an Alexandria, Virginia, law firm.

As an attorney, Lee was involved in a number of notable cases. He was one of the first to assert the "battered woman defense" in a murder case in 1978 and his client was acquitted of murder. He successfully defended a Vietnam veteran in a criminal case and arranged for the veteran to receive proper medical treatment for Post Traumatic Stress Disorder and drug treatment. As counsel for local civil rights organization he defended the principal of a local high school against disciplinary action after school officials learned he was in an interracial marriage. He defended a number of corporations against commercial and employment claims.

Lee was an active member of the Virginia State Bar. He was an elected member of the Virginia State Bar Council, Chairman of the General Practice of Law Section, President of the Northern Virginia Black Attorneys Association, and Chairman of the Judicial Selection Committee of the Alexandria Bar Association.

In 1990, Governor Douglas Wilder appointed Lee to serve on the Board of Directors of the Metropolitan Washington Airports Authority, the managers of Washington National and Dulles International Airports. During his tenure on the board both airports were in the midst of modernization and expansion.

When he was under consideration for the appointment, Lee's credentials were reviewed by twelve bar associations. Lee received the highest rating possible for all twelve bar associations for the appointment.

=== As a state judge ===
Prior to his appointment to the United States District Court, Lee was a trial judge with the 19th Judicial Circuit of Virginia (Fairfax) for six and one-half years. As a Circuit Court Judge in Virginia's largest and busiest trial court, he tried a wide variety of cases, both jury and non-jury. His trial docket included cases involving commercial law, products liability, personal injury, medical malpractice, contracts, and criminal law.

During his tenure on the Fairfax Bench, Lee was an active member of the Virginia Judges Judicial Conference. He served on two key committees of the conference, the Circuit Court Judicial Education Committee, and the Circuit Court Judges Bench Book Committee. He served as Chairman of the Judicial Educational Committee, and was responsible for ongoing training and continuing education programs for 150 state trial judges. Lee served as a member of the Bench Book Committee, where he was responsible for editing and updating the Virginia Judges' courtroom reference text, the Virginia Circuit Court Judges Benchbook.

Lee has been a member of the legal community for twenty-five years. Subsequent to his appointment to the Fairfax Circuit Court in 1992, he became known throughout the legal community for his handling of complex civil cases, his efforts to improve the court's use of technology, and his commitment to community service.

=== As a federal judge ===
In April 1998, Virginia's United States Senators Chuck Robb and John Warner recommended Lee for appointment to the United States District Court for the Eastern District of Virginia, to fill the seat vacated when Judge James C. Cacheris assumed senior status. President Clinton made the nomination on May 22, 1998, which was confirmed by the Senate in unanimous vote on September 28, 1998. He received his commission on October 1, 1998. He retired from active service on September 30, 2017.

==== Notable cases ====
- Brian Patrick Regan, former Air Force master sergeant convicted of espionage
- Jay Lentz, who was acquitted of the kidnapping and murder of his ex-wife, but later convicted on retrial before Judge T. S. Ellis III
- Ahmed Omar Abu Ali, convicted of providing material support to Al-Qaeda and a conspiracy to assassinate the President of the United States

== Commentary ==
Lee coined the phrase "adrenaline of excellence" for what occurs in the instant before entering the courtroom to begin a proceeding.

One day I was about to enter court and one of my student interns, a WCL [Washington College of Law] student, asked me, he said, "Well, Judge, are you ever afraid when you walk into the courtroom? Is it fear that you experience?" I stopped and I thought about it and I said, You know, we're never afraid as we enter a courtroom or as we begin a presentation, fear suggests that we're not prepared or that we're inadequate. What we experience as we're about to enter a courtroom as lawyers to present a case is what I call "the adrenaline of excellence." I call it "the adrenaline of excellence," I call it that because, as you walk into a room, what you experience is your body and your muscles tighten, your heart and your mind concentrate, and your body and your heart and mind are telling you that you're prepared to deliver peak performance, so I call the feeling of what you're about to do "the adrenaline of excellence."

Lee's motto is "To whom much is given, much is expected."

== Controversy ==
In 2003, Lee dismissed the kidnapping and murder charges against Jay E. Lentz, a former naval intelligence officer, even though a jury had found him guilty. It marked the first time a judge dismissed a jury verdict in a federal death penalty case. Earlier in the case, Lee advised a witness that if she cried he would stop her testimony, a move that is unusual in that it is rare for a judge to preview testimony in a death penalty hearing or restrict how witnesses can act or what they can say.

In the 2011 case of USA v. Ishmael Jones, a pen name, Lee ruled in summary judgment for the government that Jones, a former CIA officer, had violated his agreement with the Agency by failing to obtain pre-publication approval for his book.

== See also ==
- List of African-American federal judges
- List of African-American jurists

== Sources ==
Legal offices
Preceded by James C. Cacheris	Judge of the United States District Court for the Eastern District of Virginia; 1998–2017	Succeeded by Rossie D. Alston Jr.
