= Rossie D. Alston Jr. =

American judge (born 1957)

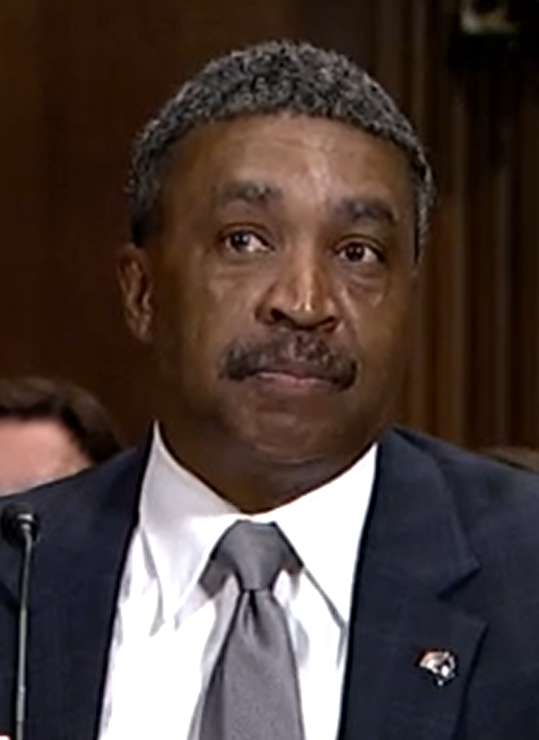

Judge of the United States District Court for the Eastern District of Virginia
- Incumbent
- Assumed office June 12, 2019
- Appointed by: Donald Trump
- Preceded by: Gerald Bruce Lee

Judge of the Court of Appeals of Virginia
- In office March 1, 2009 – June 12, 2019
- Preceded by: Jean Harrison Clements

Judge of the Prince William County Circuit Court
- In office 2001–2009

Judge of the Prince William County Juvenile and Domestic Relations District Court
- In office 1998–2001

Personal details
- Born: Rossie David Alston Jr. May 31, 1957 (age 69) Washington, D.C., U.S.
- Spouse: Carol Miller
- Education: Averett University (BA); North Carolina Central University (JD)

Military service
- Allegiance: United States
- Branch/service: United States Army
- Years of service: 1975
- Rank: Private First Class

Rossie David Alston Jr. (born May 31, 1957) is a United States district judge of the United States District Court for the Eastern District of Virginia. He was appointed by President Donald Trump in 2019.

He was formerly a Judge of the Court of Appeals of Virginia after having previously been a judge in the Prince William County Circuit Court and the Prince William County Juvenile and Domestic Relations District Court.

== Biography ==
Alston graduated with a Bachelor of Arts degree from Averett University in 1979 and obtained his Juris Doctor from the North Carolina Central University School of Law in 1982. He worked as a staff attorney for the National Labor Relations Board for two years before going into private practice. He was elected by the Virginia General Assembly to be a judge of the Juvenile and Domestic Relations District Court for the 31st Judicial District, encompassing Prince William County, in 1998.

He was elected to the Prince William County Circuit Court in 2001. While on the circuit court, he presided over the case of John Allen Muhammad, the mastermind of the D.C. sniper attacks, which brought him national attention. He was selected by his colleagues to be Chief Judge of the circuit court in 2007, when that position became vacant upon the elevation of LeRoy F. Millette Jr. to the Court of Appeals. Alston was elevated to the Virginia Court of Appeals in 2009 to fill the vacancy created upon the retirement of Jean Harrison Clements.

Alston was known to be tough on violent criminals and those he thought had squandered second chances. He is quoted as saying "If you deserve the hammer, you're getting the hammer." In another case a man whose 21-month-old child died in a sweltering van, the jury recommended a one-year prison sentence. However Alston instead ordered the father to spend a day in jail for seven years on the anniversary of his daughter's death and run an annual blood drive in her name.

On March 4, 2016, the state Senate Courts of Justice Committee certified Alston as qualified for a seat on the Virginia Supreme Court after the Senate nominated him to be elected to a twelve-year term. He was blocked by Democrats in the House of Delegates from joining the state Supreme Court.

=== Federal judicial service ===
On June 7, 2018, President Donald Trump announced his intent to nominate Alston to serve as a United States district judge of the United States District Court for the Eastern District of Virginia. He was Trump's second African American federal judicial nominee. On June 18, 2018, his nomination was sent to the United States Senate. Trump nominated Alston to the seat on the vacated by Gerald Bruce Lee, who retired on September 30, 2017. On October 10, 2018, a hearing on his nomination was held before the Senate Judiciary Committee.

On January 3, 2019, his nomination was returned to the President under Rule XXXI, Paragraph 6 of the Senate. On January 23, 2019, President Trump announced his intent to renominate Alston Jr. for a federal judgeship. His nomination was sent to the Senate later that day. On February 7, 2019, his nomination was reported out of committee by a 20–2 vote.

On June 5, 2019, the Senate invoked cloture on Alston's nomination by a 74–19 vote. On June 10, 2019, his nomination was confirmed by a 75–20 vote. He received his judicial commission on June 12, 2019.

In December 2023, Alston issued a temporary restraining order (TRO) preventing the U.S. Army from removing the 1914 Confederate Monument at Arlington National Cemetery, pending a hearing. This memorial was commissioned in 1914 by the United Daughters of the Confederacy and is dedicated "To our dead heroes"; in 2022, the Renaming Commission recommended in a report to Congress the removal of the statuary, along with other Confederate monuments and memorials on Defense Department property. However, some Republican politicians had expressed opposition to removing the memorial, expressing the belief that this Monument, the work of sculptor and Confederate veteran Sir Moses Ezekiel, commemorates the reconciliation of the North and South post-Appomattox and not the Confederate States of America. Alston's order was issued after a group called Defend Arlington, the plaintiffs seeking to halt the memorial's removal, alleged that Ezekiel's headstones was damaged during the removal. However, one day after issuing the TRO, Alston allow the removal to go forward, denying the plaintiff's request for a preliminary injunction; during a hearing and in an order, Alston wrote that Defend Arlington had not come forward with evidence of any disturbance of graves, and during a site visit he had seen nothing supporting the group's claims. The Army resumed its removal work after Alston's order.

== See also ==
- List of African-American federal judges
- List of African-American jurists

Legal offices
Preceded by Jean Harrison Clements	Judge of the Court of Appeals of Virginia; 2009–2019	Vacant
Preceded by Gerald Bruce Lee	Judge of the United States District Court for the Eastern District of Virginia; 2019–present	Incumbent
