= Ishmael Jones =

Pseudonym of a former CIA officer

Ishmael Jones (born 15 December 1960) is the pseudonym used by a former CIA officer. He resigned from the CIA and became a leading proponent of American intelligence reform, with special emphasis on the improvement of human source intelligence collection (Humint). He is a former deep cover case officer (or clandestine officer) for the Central Intelligence Agency (CIA). He is the author of the book The Human Factor: Inside the CIA's Dysfunctional Intelligence Culture and many articles on intelligence reform. He believes that improvement of American intelligence capabilities is necessary to protect Americans and American allies.

== Early years ==
Jones was born in the United States and raised in the Middle East, East Asia, and East Africa. He attended universities in the US and served as an officer in the US Marine Corps.

== Active CIA career ==
In the late 1980s he joined the Central Intelligence Agency where he served as a deep cover officer focusing on human sources with access to intelligence on weapons of mass destruction and terrorism. Except for his initial training and service in the United States, his career was spent entirely in the field, and his assignments included more than 15 years of continuous overseas service in numerous countries and several rogue nations. He resigned from the CIA in good standing in order to work toward intelligence reform.

== Work toward intelligence reform ==
After resigning in good standing, Jones began to work for intelligence reform by meeting with members of Congress and their staffs, members of the executive branch, journalists, political operatives and political contributors, and writing articles and a book.

While many policy and opinion makers agree that the CIA's human source programs do not function effectively, Jones believes the problems are not to be found with the quality of employees in the CIA, who he considers overwhelmingly talented and intelligent. Rather, the problem lies within the structure of the organization itself, which encourages a bureaucracy featuring excessive layers of non-producing administrators and managers.

Jones recommends dramatic reductions in the layers of managers and administrators and restructuring of the CIA's chain of command to clarify precisely who is in charge of any given operation.

He also recommends the introduction of a whistleblower system in which any CIA employee with information on fraud can contact a cleared FBI agent.

== The Human Factor ==
In 2008, Jones published The Human Factor: Inside the CIA's Dysfunctional Intelligence Culture describing his work against weapons of mass destruction proliferators and terrorists, and offering solutions to intelligence reform in an appendix. While the topic of intelligence collection and intelligence reform is deadly serious, Jones' writing when dealing with situational espionage and government bureaucracy contains humor. "If the subject were not so deadly serious, The Human Factor would be one of the funniest books of the year," wrote David Forsmark in FrontPage Magazine.

In 2011, US district court judge Gerald Lee ruled that Jones had violated the law by not properly going through CIA's pre-publication review process. Jones claimed the process was deliberately stalled by the CIA. The ruling marked the first time a judge has used summary judgment to rule in favor of the CIA, as plaintiff, in a censorship case.
