= ICEBlock =

Online map

- Developer: Joshua Aaron
- Release: April 2025; 1 year ago
- Stable release: 1.44 / August 1, 2025; 15 months ago
- Platform: iOS 18.2+
- Available in: 18 languages
- List of languages Arabic, Armenian, English, French, German, Hindi, Indonesian, Italian, Korean, Nepali, Portuguese, Russian, Chinese, Slovenian, Spanish, Ukrainian, Urdu, Vietnamese
- Type: Online map; Participatory GIS; Mashup
- License: Proprietary software
- Website: www.iceblock.app

ICEBlock is an online map iOS-only application service that provides locations of Immigration and Customs Enforcement (ICE) agents in the United States which is reported by app users. The app was developed by Joshua Aaron, who began developing it in April 2025. At the beginning of July, the app was the third-most popular free app on the App Store, with around 95,200 users. The app was removed from the App Store in October 2025, after the Department of Justice urged Apple to do so. It was compatible with iPhone XR and later.

ICEBlock allows users to report the locations of ICE agents; optionally, they can also provide additional information about the agents. Reported sightings are visible within a five-mile radius for four hours. Users nearby are also alerted when a sighting is reported. The app also warns that it is not to be used for the incitement of violence or for interfering with law enforcement.

== Features and functionality ==
ICEBlock allows users to report the location of Immigration and Customs Enforcement agents and provide optional details about the official, with a warning stating, "Please note that the use of this app is for information and notification purposes only. It is not to be used for the purposes of inciting violence or interfering with law enforcement." Users are not allowed to report more than one sighting every five minutes, and reported sightings are visible within a five-mile radius, disappearing after four hours. After a sighting is reported, those in a nearby radius are notified. ICEBlock does not collect personal data; it is only available on iOS, as Aaron believes Android would require an app to collect push notification information that could put users at greater risk. The app is available in fourteen languages, including Arabic, Hindi, Nepali, Spanish, and Vietnamese.

== App reviews ==
Slate praised ICEBlock as "a welcome indicator that grassroots momentum for immigration advocacy hasn't let up." Cooper Quintin, a security engineer at the Electronic Frontier Foundation, analyzed the network traffic of ICEBlock and confirmed that individual reports are anonymous, and the app does not actively collect the geolocation or device information of its users.

Aaron's claims that an Android version of the app would de-anonymize users to a greater extent than iOS have been disputed by the development team of GrapheneOS. Both The Verge and cybersecurity expert Bruce Schneier expressed doubts about some of the privacy claims made by the app. Micah Lee, a journalist involved in the handling of the Snowden leaks, noted multiple transparency issues with ICEBlock, including unfounded privacy claims, a refusal to make the app open source or allow third-party audits of the source code, and no method for handling false positives.

== History ==
In April 2025, in response to Donald Trump's second term as president and his immigration policy, Joshua Aaron began developing ICEBlock.

"When I brought it to Apple and I submitted it to the app store, it got pushed back, and it took three weeks of going back and forth with Apple’s legal department and higher-ups in Apple’s app review, and there were conversations almost on a daily basis with senior people there saying: “Is this even legal? Can we do this? Are we going to get in trouble for having this?” Apple had a hard time wrapping their head around it, because they were like, “What do you mean you’re never going to make money? What do you mean you’re never going to track anything?” I was like, “Yeah, that’s the point. I don’t care.” I don’t care about people’s data as far as, like, being able to get analytics or track them or sell their data. I don’t care about any of that. I care about keeping people safe. That is literally the whole point. Eventually they allowed it on." - Joshua Aaron, July 2025

In June 2025, the app garnered attention amid protests in Los Angeles.

In July 2025, Aaron said that the app had twenty thousand users, primarily in Los Angeles. After receiving media attention from Trump officials following a CNN report on the app, ICEBlock became the third-most downloaded free app in the App Store and the most downloaded free social networking app. Aaron told NBC News that ICEBlock had approximately 95,200 users by the beginning of July.

On July 1, 2025, in response to CNN's reporting on ICEBlock, Secretary of Homeland Security Kristi Noem stated that she was in communication with the United States Department of Justice (DOJ) to investigate the possibility of prosecuting CNN over its article. Tom Homan, the executive associate director of enforcement and removal operations, and Todd Lyons, the acting director of Immigration and Customs Enforcement, broadly criticized CNN for reporting on the app. Attorney General Pam Bondi warned Aaron to "watch out", and alleged that it could cause federal agents to be injured, although ICEBlock warns users against using the app for "inciting violence or interfering with law enforcement". According to Aaron, ICEBlock's legality has been attested to by several lawyers. Aaron's full legal name and home address was published online by right-wing figures on X over the app.

On July 18, 2025, Joshua Aaron's wife, Carolyn Feinstein was fired from work as a bankruptcy auditor for the United States Department of Justice in Austin, Texas. Aaron claimed in an interview with The Guardian that this dismissal was in retaliation against him as he individually could not be attacked having been uninvolved in any illegal act. Aaron alleges that she had no involvement in the development or operation of the ICEBlock app. According to Aaron, she was accused of lack of candor in the termination letter. Aaron further alleges that the app was not mentioned in the letter. When journalists contacted the United States Department of Justice, a prepared statement was sent out stating that she was endangering the lives of ICE agents.

On August 17, 2025, at Hackers on Planet Earth HOPE_16, developer Joshua Aaron was interviewed remotely about ICEBlock.

On October 2, 2025, the app's listing was removed from the Apple App Store after the Department of Justice, at the direction of Attorney General Pam Bondi, demanded its removal. In a statement, Bondi said, "We reached out to Apple today demanding they remove the ICEBlock app from their App Store — and Apple did so." Apple stated it removed the app "based on information we've received from law enforcement about the safety risks associated with ICEBlock." A similar app for both iOS and Android, Red Dot, was removed from both the App Store and Google Play a few weeks earlier. Aaron criticized the move as "capitulating to an authoritarian regime," and Kate Ruane of the Center for Democracy and Technology said the removal should be viewed as part of the Trump administration's attempts to weaken free speech.

Aaron v. Bondi
- Court: United States District Court for the District of Columbia
- Started: December 8, 2025
- Docket nos.: 1:25-cv-04250

Court membership
- Judge sitting: Dabney Friedrich

Joshua Aaron filed a lawsuit against several high-ranking Trump administration officials, including U.S. Attorney General Pam Bondi and Secretary of Homeland Security Kristi Noem. The lawsuit, lodged on December 8, 2025, in a D.C. federal court, claims the government violated the developer's First Amendment rights (freedom of speech). This violation allegedly occurred when the officials used pressure and coercion to force Apple to remove the ICEBlock app from its distribution platform. The ICEBlock application allowed users to share and track public sightings of U.S. Immigration and Customs Enforcement (ICE) agents. The developer is seeking a judicial declaration that the government's action constitutes unconstitutional censorship and an order preventing future interference with app distributors.

== See also ==
- Waze – an app that provides real-time information on traffic conditions and police speed enforcement activity, technically similar to ICEBlock but for different purposes
- Sideloading - installing an app in .ipa format onto an Apple device

== Works cited ==
- Duffy, Clare (June 30, 2025). "'I wanted to do something to fight back': This iPhone app alerts users to nearby ICE sightings". CNN.
- Forlini, Emily (July 1, 2025). "What Is the ICEBlock App? Attorney General Tells Its Creator to 'Watch Out'". PCMag.
- Grynbaum, Michael (July 1, 2025). "Kristi Noem raises prospect of prosecuting CNN over ICE app story". The New York Times.
- Jiménez, Marisol (July 1, 2025). "ICEBlock: The app that alerts users about immigration raids". El País.
- Mastrangelo, Dominick (July 1, 2025). "Homan: DOJ needs to 'look' at CNN's ICE reporting". The Hill.
- Moon, Mariella (July 1, 2025). "ICEBlock climbs to the top of the App Store charts after officials slam it". Engadget.
- Pahwa, Nitish (May 16, 2025). "Immigration Crackdowns Are Booming. So Is the Digital Resistance Fighting Them". Slate.
- Rosenblatt, Kalhan (July 2, 2025). "App that allows people to share ICE sightings gets boost in downloads after White House backlash". NBC News.
- Roth, Emma (July 2, 2025). "ICE-tracking app tops App Store". The Verge.
- Sutherland, Callum (June 30, 2025). "ICEBlock, an iPhone App Intended to Alert Users of Nearby ICE Sightings, Comes Under Fire". Time.
