= List of United States federal courthouses in Virginia =

Following is a list of current and former courthouses of the United States federal court system located in Virginia. Each entry indicates the name of the building along with an image, if available, its location and the jurisdiction it covers, the dates during which it was used for each such jurisdiction, and, if applicable the person for whom it was named, and the date of renaming. Dates of use will not necessarily correspond with the dates of construction or demolition of a building, as pre-existing structures may be adapted or court use, and former court buildings may later be put to other uses. Also, the official name of the building may be changed at some point after its use as a federal court building has been initiated.

== Courthouses ==
Courthouse	City	Image	Street address	Jurisdiction	Dates of use	Named for
U.S. Post Office and Courthouse	Abingdon		?	W.D. Va.	1890–?	n/a
U.S. Courthouse	Abingdon		180 West Main Street	W.D. Va.	1960–present	n/a
U.S. Custom House and Post Office	Alexandria		?	E.D. Va.	1871–1930; Razed in 1930.	n/a
Martin V.B. Bostetter, Jr. U.S. Courthouse	Alexandria		200 South Washington Street	E.D. Va.	1931–present	Martin V.B. Bostetter
Albert V. Bryan U.S. Courthouse	Alexandria		401 Courthouse Square	E.D. Va.	1995–present	District Court judge Albert V. Bryan
C. Bascom Slemp Federal Building^{†}	Big Stone Gap		401 East Wood Avenue	W.D. Va.	1913–1950; 1978–present	U.S. Rep. C. Bascom Slemp (1978)
U.S. Post Office and Courthouse	Charlottesville		201 East Market Street	W.D. Va.	1907–1980; Now the Jefferson-Madison Regional Library.	n/a
Federal Building and U.S. Courthouse	Charlottesville		255 West Main Street	W.D. Va.	1980–present	n/a
U.S. Courthouse and Post Office	Danville		?	W.D. Va.	1883–1934; Razed in the 1930s.	n/a
U.S. Post Office and Courthouse	Danville		700 East Main Street	W.D. Va.	1934–present	n/a
U.S. Courthouse and Post Office	Harrisonburg		?	W.D. Va.	1889–c. 1930; Razed in the 1930s.	n/a
U.S. Courthouse	Harrisonburg		116 N. Main Street	W.D. Va.	1940–present	n/a
U.S. Courthouse and Post Office	Lynchburg		?	W.D. Va.	1888–1912; Razed in 1912.	n/a
U.S. Post Office and Courthouse	Lynchburg		901 Church Street	W.D. Va.	1912–1933; Now the Monument Terrace Building	n/a
U.S. Post Office and Courthouse	Lynchburg		900 Church Street	W.D. Va.	1933–1980; Now Lynchburg City Hall.	n/a
U.S. Courthouse	Lynchburg		1101 Court Street	W.D. Va.	?–present	n/a
U.S. Post Office, Courthouse and Custom House	Newport News		101 25th Street	E.D. Va.	1938–2007	n/a
U.S. Courthouse	Newport News		2400 West Avenue	E.D. Va.	2007–present	n/a
Owen B. Pickett U.S. Custom House†	Norfolk		101 East Main Street	E.D. Va. D. Va.	1859–1900; Still in use as a custom house.	U.S. Rep. Owen B. Pickett
U.S. Courthouse and Post Office†	Norfolk		235 East Plume Street	E.D. Va.	1900–1934; Later used as City Hall; now part of the Slover Library	n/a
Walter E. Hoffman U.S. Courthouse^{†}	Norfolk		600 Granby Street	E.D. Va.	1934–present	District Court judge Walter Edward Hoffman
U.S. Custom House and Post Office†	Petersburg	Custom House & Post Office, Petersburg, VA	135 North Union Street	E.D. Va.	1858–1938; Now Petersburg City Hall.	n/a
Lewis F. Powell, Jr. U.S. Courthouse^{†}	Richmond		1000 East Main Street	E.D. Va. D. Va. 4th Cir.	1858–1861; 1865–present	Supreme Court Justice Lewis F. Powell, Jr.
Spottswood W. Robinson III and Robert R. Merhige, Jr., Federal Courthouse	Richmond		701 East Broad Street	E.D. Va.	2008–present	Court of Appeals judge Spottswood W. Robinson III and District Court judge Robert R. Merhige, Jr.
U.S. Post Office and Courthouse	Roanoke		?	W.D. Va.	1902–1931; Completed in 1897; building razed.	n/a
U.S. Post Office and Courthouse	Roanoke		210 Church Avenue Southwest	W.D. Va.	1931–? Now privately owned and leased to the Bankruptcy Court for the Western District of Virginia.	n/a
Richard H. Poff Federal Building	Roanoke		210 Franklin Road Southwest	W.D. Va.	?–present Completed in 1975.	Richard Harding Poff
U.S. Custom House†	Wheeling (now West Virginia)		1528 Market Street	W.D. Va. D.W.V. N.D.W.V.	1860–1907; Now a museum, renamed West Virginia Independence Hall.	n/a

== Key ==
^{†}	Listed on the National Register of Historic Places (NRHP)
^{††}	NRHP-listed and also designated as a National Historic Landmark
