= Kellam =

Kellam is a surname. Notable people with the surname include:

- Alphonso G. Kellam (1837–1909), American lawyer, judge, and Republican politician
- Eman Kellam (born 1997), Nigerian British actor, rapper, television presenter
- Ian Kellam (1933–2014), British composer and teacher
- Murray Kellam, formerly a judge of the Supreme Court of Victoria, Australia
- Paul Kellam (born 1965), Professor of Viral Genomics at Imperial College London
- Phillip Kellam (born 1956), politician from a well known political family in Virginia Beach
- Richard Boykin Kellam (1909–1996), United States district judge in the Eastern District of Virginia
- Gregory Kellam Scott (1948–2021), associate justice of the Colorado Supreme Court
- Arthur Kellam Tylee OBE (1887–1961), Canadian officer in the Royal Flying Corps during World War I

== See also ==
- Lucius J. Kellam Jr. Bridge-Tunnel, a 17.6-mile (28.3-km) bridge–tunnel in the U.S. state of Virginia
- Floyd E. Kellam High School, public high school in Virginia Beach, Virginia
