= David J. Novak =

American judge (born 1961)

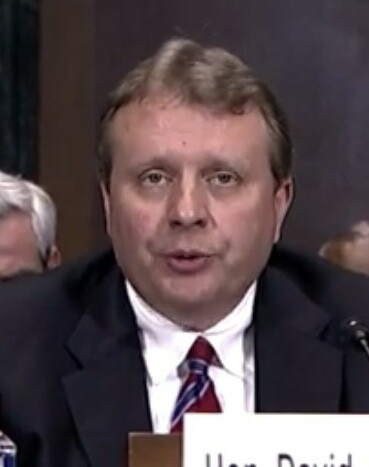

Judge of the United States Foreign Intelligence Surveillance Court
- Incumbent
- Assumed office May 19, 2026
- Appointed by: John Roberts
- Preceded by: George Z. Singal

Judge of the United States District Court for the Eastern District of Virginia
- Incumbent
- Assumed office October 17, 2019
- Appointed by: Donald Trump
- Preceded by: Henry E. Hudson

Magistrate Judge of the United States District Court for the Eastern District of Virginia
- In office February 1, 2012 – October 17, 2019
- Preceded by: Dennis Dohnal
- Succeeded by: Elizabeth Hanes

Personal details
- Born: 1961 (age 64–65) Greensburg, Pennsylvania, U.S.
- Education: Saint Vincent College (BA); Villanova University (JD)

David John Novak (born 1961) is a United States district judge for the United States District Court for the Eastern District of Virginia and a former United States magistrate judge of the same court.

== Education ==
Novak received his Bachelor of Arts, magna cum laude, from Saint Vincent College in 1983 and his Juris Doctor from Villanova University School of Law in 1986.

== Legal career ==
Novak has served in multiple positions at the United States Department of Justice, including serving as an Assistant United States Attorney in the Southern District of Texas from 1991 to 1994 and as a Trial Attorney in the Criminal Division. He later served 18 years as an Assistant United States Attorney in the Eastern District of Virginia, including as Chief of the Criminal Division and as Senior Litigation Counsel.

== Federal judicial service ==
=== Failed nomination for district court under Bush ===
On November 15, 2007, President George W. Bush nominated Novak to serve as a Judge on the United States District Court for the Eastern District of Virginia to the seat vacated by Robert E. Payne, who assumed senior status on May 7, 2007. A hearing on his nomination was held on April 3, 2008. The Senate never acted on the nomination.

=== United States magistrate judge ===
In 2012 he was selected to be a United States magistrate judge for the United States District Court for the Eastern District of Virginia and served as one until his elevation as a federal district judge.

=== Renomination to district court under Trump ===
On March 15, 2019, President Donald Trump announced his intent to nominate Novak to serve as a United States district judge for the United States District Court for the Eastern District of Virginia. On March 26, 2019, his nomination was sent to the Senate. Novak was nominated to the seat vacated by Judge Henry E. Hudson, who assumed senior status on June 1, 2018. On April 30, 2019, a hearing on his nomination was held before the Senate Judiciary Committee. On June 13, 2019, his nomination was reported out of committee by a 19–3 vote. On October 16, 2019, the United States Senate invoked cloture on his nomination by a 86–4 vote. His nomination was confirmed later that day by a 89–3 vote. He received his judicial commission on October 17, 2019.

=== Notable rulings ===
On January 6, 2026, Novak issued an order directing Lindsey Halligan to provide an explanation within seven days of why she identified herself as the United States Attorney for the Eastern District of Virginia, contradicting "a binding Court Order" from Senior Judge Cameron McGowan Currie. On November 24, 2025, Judge Currie had previously found President Trump's appointment of Lindsey Halligan to be interim U.S. Attorney for the Eastern District of Virginia to be unlawful, as it "violated 28 U.S.C. § 546 and the Appointments Clause of the U.S. Constitution.” Novak also directed Halligan to explain why her identification as U.S. Attorney should not be stricken and why it did not "constitute a false or misleading act."

Legal offices
Preceded by Henry E. Hudson	Judge of the United States District Court for the Eastern District of Virginia; 2019–present	Incumbent
Preceded by George Z. Singal	Judge of the United States Foreign Intelligence Surveillance Court; 2026–present	Incumbent
