= Albert Bryan =

Albert Bryan may refer to:

- Albertus Bryne (1620s–1668), aka Albert Bryan, English organist and composer
- Albert Vickers Bryan (1899–1984), US federal judge
- Albert Vickers Bryan Jr. (1926–2019), US federal judge and son of Albert Vickers Bryan
- Albert Bryan Jr. (born 1968), Governor of the U.S. Virgin Islands

== See also ==
- Albert Bryant Jr., United States Army brigadier general
