= Merhige =

Merhige is a surname. Notable people with the surname include:

- E. Elias Merhige (born 1964), American filmmaker
- Robert R. Merhige Jr. (1919–2005), American judge
