= Inez Baker =

American politician (1921–2011)

Inez DeGraw Baker

Member of the Virginia House of Delegates from Portsmouth
- In office 1959 – January 12, 1960
- Preceded by: John A. MacKenzie
- Succeeded by: Donald Sandie Jr.

Member of the Virginia House of Delegates from Portsmouth
- In office January 12, 1966 – January 9, 1968 Serving with Willard J. Moody
- Preceded by: Donald Sandie Jr.
- Succeeded by: Glenn Yates Jr.

Personal details
- Born: Margaret Inez DeGraw; January 6, 1921 Baltimore, Maryland, U.S.
- Died: March 11, 2011 (aged 90) Portsmouth, Virginia, U.S.
- Party: Democratic
- Spouse: Barnabas William (Billy) Baker

(Margaret) Inez DeGraw Baker (January 6, 1921 – March 11, 2011) was an American civic activist, bookkeeper, housewife and Democratic politician who became the first woman to represent Portsmouth, Virginia in the Virginia General Assembly. First elected during the Massive Resistance crisis in 1959, she served two separate terms in the Virginia House of Delegates.

== Early and family life ==
Born in Baltimore, Maryland to George DeGraw, a shipyard welder, and his wife Lucy. By the 1930 census, the family included two sons (12 year old George Jr. and 9 year old Raymond) and baby Gertrude. During the Great Depression, the DeGraw family moved back to Virginia. Inez attended the Portsmouth, Virginia public schools and graduated from then-all-white Woodrow Wilson High School in 1938. On June 1, 1941, she married her former classmate, Barnabas William ("Billy") Baker, of an established Portsmouth family and who could trace his ancestry to the colonial era.

== Career ==
After graduation, she worked as a stenographer and bookkeeper, and lived at home with her parents, brother Raymond (who had become a shipfitter apprentice), and sister Gertrude. During World War II, Baker worked as a bookkeeper for the American Red Cross. Her husband had been a reserve draftsman with the U.S. Army Air Corps during the war, then became a sheriff's deputy and ran an ambulance and taxicab business, as well as won election to the city council for eight years and served as Portsmouth's mayor in 1958-1960, before retiring to concentrate on his azalea horticulture business.

Inez Baker ran for a seat in the Virginia House of Delegates to succeed lawyer and fellow Episcopalian John Ashton MacKenzie, and served alongside Willard J. Moody (who repeatedly won re-election and represented the city for decades in both houses of the Virginia General Assembly). Unlike Moody, MacKenzie and her successor, who were attorneys and political moderates who continued to support Gov. Almond after he acknowledged decisions by federal judges and the Virginia Supreme Court which upheld racial integration in Virginia's schools in 1959, Baker aligned with the Byrd Organization and supported Massive Resistance to racial integration. Fellow Episcopalian and lawyer Donald Sandie Jr. succeeded her beginning in January 1960, following an election when Baker only won 7% of the votes cast. Her opposition to the proposed state sales tax also proved insufficient for victory.

Nonetheless, Baker ran again and narrowly won election to the spring 1966 legislative session over architect Glenn Yates Jr., again serving alongside veteran Moody, whom Yates would succeed in the 1968 session. During her second term Baker worked with the three other women in the state legislature, Mary A. R. Marshall of Arlington, Marion Galland of Alexandria and Dorothy McDiarmid of Fairfax. She gained favorable publicity for her unsuccessful attempt to have the new "car tax" reduced for people who traded in older vehicles, and for calling for a study to permit unemployment benefits for state and local employees not currently covered. However, Baker was defeated in the next Democratic primary (Yates and newcomers Lester E. Schiltz and L. Cleaves Manning all outpolling her). Thus, she again only served a single term, although the next legislature still had four women because Richmond voters elected Eleanor P. Sheppard. Until mid-1966, she had supported Senator Willis Robertson, a Democratic and Byrd Organization stalwart, who was also defeated in that primary election, by William B. Spong, Jr., a Portsmouth lawyer whom President Lyndon Johnson and his allies had recruited to oppose the Byrd organization.

== Death and legacy ==
Baker died in Portsmouth in 2011, survived by her husband (who would remarry the next year) as well as nieces and nephew. She is buried at historic Cedar Grove cemetery in Portsmouth. Barnabas Baker died at age 100, and was buried with military honors beside her in 2020.

Virginia House of Delegates
Preceded by	Virginia Delegate for Arlington; 1958–1959	Succeeded by
