= Spencer Bell =

Spencer Bell may refer to:

- Spencer Bell (actor) (1887–1935), American actor and comedian
- J. Spencer Bell (1906–1967), American federal judge
- James Spencer-Bell (1818–1872), British MP
