= Robert Nelson Pollard =

American judge (1880–1954)

Senior Judge of the United States District Court for the Eastern District of Virginia
- In office April 22, 1947 – May 24, 1954

Judge of the United States District Court for the Eastern District of Virginia
- In office February 27, 1936 – April 22, 1947
- Appointed by: Franklin D. Roosevelt
- Preceded by: Seat established by 49 Stat. 508
- Succeeded by: Albert Vickers Bryan

Personal details
- Born: Robert Nelson Pollard; June 16, 1880 King and Queen County, Virginia, U.S.
- Died: May 24, 1954 (aged 73) Richmond, Virginia, U.S.
- Resting place: Hollywood Cemetery
- Education: University of Virginia School of Law; University of Richmond School of Law (LL.B.)

Robert Nelson Pollard (June 16, 1880 – May 24, 1954) was a United States district judge of the United States District Court for the Eastern District of Virginia.

== Education and career ==
Born in King and Queen County, Virginia, Pollard attended the University of Virginia School of Law and received a Bachelor of Laws from the University of Richmond School of Law in 1903. He was in private practice in Richmond, Virginia from 1904 to 1930. He was a Judge of the Law and Equity Court of Richmond from 1930 to 1936.

== Federal judicial service ==
On February 20, 1936, Pollard was nominated by President Franklin D. Roosevelt to a new seat on the United States District Court for the Eastern District of Virginia created by 49 Stat. 508. He was confirmed by the United States Senate on February 27, 1936, and received his commission the same day. He assumed senior status due to a certified disability on April 22, 1947. Pollard served in that capacity until his death on May 24, 1954, in Richmond.

== Personal life ==
He had a son.

Pollard died on May 24, 1954. He was buried in Hollywood Cemetery.

== Sources ==
Legal offices
Preceded by Seat established by 49 Stat. 508	Judge of the United States District Court for the Eastern District of Virginia; 1936–1947	Succeeded by Albert Vickers Bryan
