= Harok family murder =

2013 mass murder in Brno, Czech Republic

Harok Family Murder
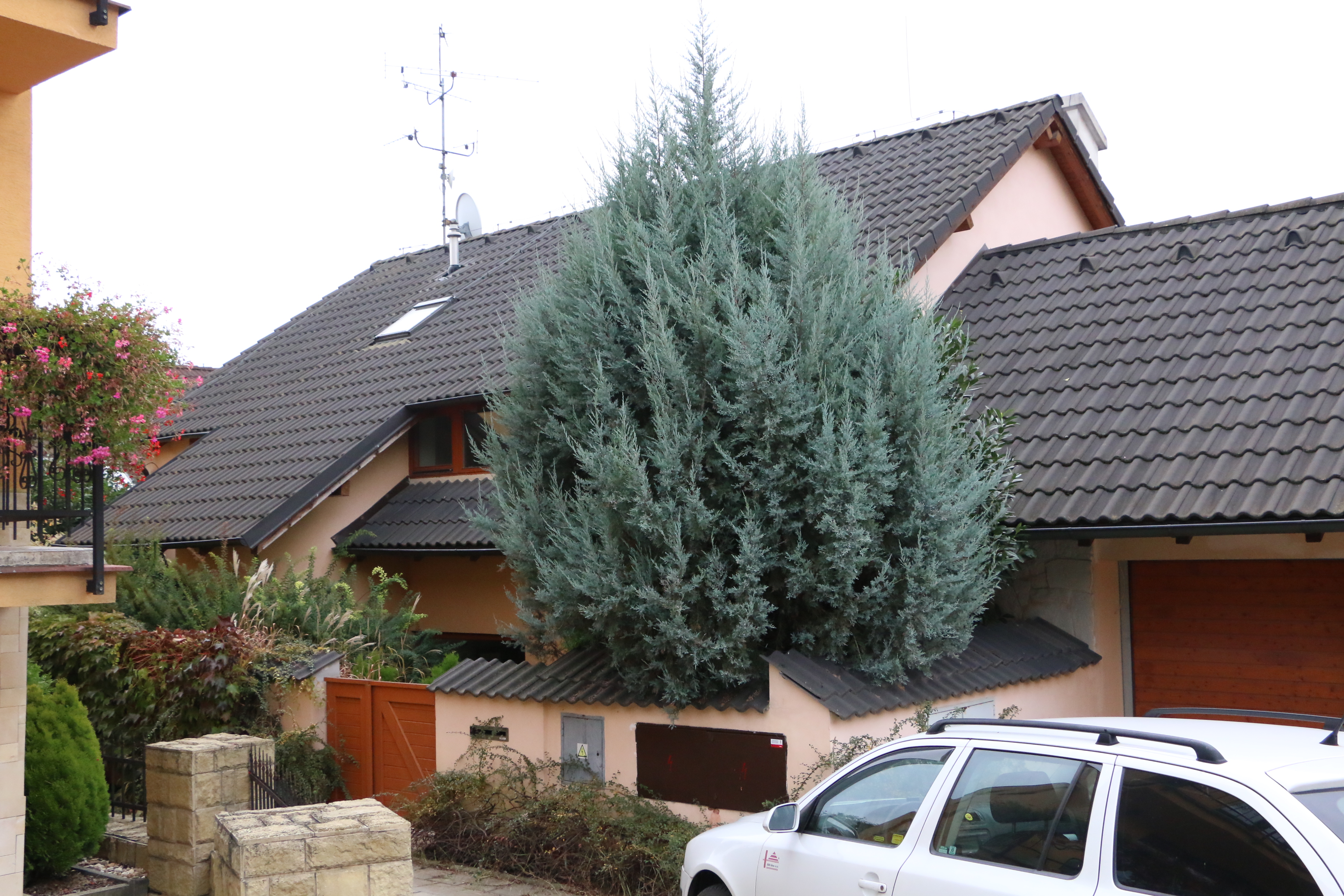
- Place of murder, Harok family house
- Location: 49.2000°N 16.6167°E; Zatloukalova 404/49a, Brno-Ivanovice, Czech Republic
- Date: 22 May 2013
- Attack type: Mass murder
- Weapons: Multiple knives, an ax, a stone
- Deaths: 4
- Victims: Veronika Haroková; Martin Harok; Filip Harok; David Harok
- Perpetrator: Kevin Dahlgren

The Harok family murder took place in the early morning of 22 May 2013 when four members of the Harok family (Veronika Haroková, her husband Martin, and their sons Filip and David) were murdered in their home in Brno, in the Czech Republic.

On 23 May 2013, the Czech police charged in absentia 20-year-old U.S. national Kevin Dahlgren, Veronika Haroková's cousin, with committing the quadruple murder.

At the time he was charged, Dahlgren was on a flight bound for Washington, D.C.; he spent two years and three months in custody in the U.S., fighting extradition. He was extradited on 31 August 2015, becoming the first United States citizen extradited to the Czech Republic. Dahlgren, who denied responsibility for the murders, faced life in prison.

In March 2016, the police closed their investigation; a month later, the State Attorney indicted Dahlgren for committing the four murders. Dahlgren was sentenced to life in prison on 20 July 2016 by Regional Court in Brno; he appealed the verdict but in March 2017 the original ruling was upheld by Superior court in Olomouc. On 11 January 2018 Dahlgren committed suicide in Valdice prison. His extraordinary appeal post-mortem was denied by Supreme Court of Czech Republic

== Victims ==
The Haroks moved to the Brno-Ivanovice district in about 2005 and were described as quiet and polite by neighbors.

Veronika Haroková (aged 46) worked as a teacher of History and the Czech language, and was also a pupil counselor at a Brno grammar school. She was described as being well liked by the students. Her husband Martin Harok (aged 55), an entrepreneur, and their son Filip (aged 25), a Masaryk University student, were both members of the Ukulele Orchestra jako Brno band. The youngest of the victims, David (aged 16), was a student, described as a promising soccer player in the Czech media.

== Investigation ==
=== Reconstruction of the murders ===
From the absence of defensive marks on their bodies, it is clear that the victims were attacked in succession, not expecting the assault.

— Assertion of the Czech police in the extradition request (see below)

According to Czech media reports, the authorities reconstructed the case as follows:

In the early morning of 22 May 2013, a girlfriend of one of the sons left the house. At 6:40 AM, Veronika Haroková called the grammar school where she worked, saying that she had a bad headache and would take the day off. The police believe that she and two other victims were killed between this time and 8:00 AM, which was when Veronika Haroková's wristwatch stopped. A post woman arrived at the door shortly before nine. The doorbell was answered by Dahlgren, who accepted the mail. Two hours later, a cleaner came to the house, but was sent away by Dahlgren immediately after entering the hallway. Meanwhile, the fourth victim, David, who was at school, received text messages from Dahlgren's phone that they would go running after his return. David was probably murdered immediately after returning to the house around 12:30 PM.

Security cameras recorded Dahlgren leaving the house later in the afternoon. He took a taxi to the Vienna International Airport, 140 km (87 miles) away, reaching the airport at about 5 PM.

=== Discovery of victims ===
Neighbors first noticed faint smoke in the afternoon of 22 May 2013; however it wasn't until shortly before 10:00 PM that day that they realised that the smoke was coming from the Harok family's garage. The neighbors entered the garage intending to extinguish what seemed to be a small fire only to find three charred bodies inside, whereupon they immediately alerted the authorities.

The victims were stabbed and slashed to death, each of them having dozens of stab- and slash-wounds in the head and face. The bodies of three of them were wrapped in cloth and set on fire. Due to the condition of the bodies the police were not immediately able to identify the victims.

=== Arrest ===
The next day the Czech authorities issued an international arrest warrant for Dahlgren, who, it was later determined, had already passed through the passport control at Vienna International Airport before his name appeared in the international database. Subsequently, at around 1 PM, the Austrian authorities alerted the crew of Austrian Airlines flight OS93 of the arrest warrant. The flight, carrying Dahlgren, had left Vienna at 10:46 AM and was at the time flying over the United Kingdom. After considering an emergency landing or returning to Vienna, the pilots decided it would be safer to continue the flight. The cabin crew were instructed to pretend to not know anything about the suspect on the flight. Immediately after landing at Washington Dulles International Airport, the plane was boarded by U.S Customs and Border Protection Officers, who arrested Dahlgren and turned him over to the FBI.

The Czech police made it public that they considered Kevin Dahlgren the prime suspect only after his arrest in the US, citing fears that he might have learned about his "wanted" status while on board the airplane, and react by endangering other passengers.

=== Kevin Dahlgren ===
Kevin Dahlgren's relation to the victims, according to Czech Television

Kevin Dahlgren was a 20-year-old native of Sacramento, California, where he graduated from Granite Bay High School, and was Veronika Haroková's cousin. He came to the Czech Republic three weeks prior to the killings to live with the Harok family. An acquaintance of Dahlgren's, identified only as Kyle K. by the Czech press reports, claimed that Dahlgren was trained in martial arts and had been expelled from a military school. Newspapers further alleged that Dahlgren was suffering with "psychological issues" and had been sent to the Czech Republic by his parents.

Dahlgren and Veronika Haroková had the same grandparents, who emigrated from Czechoslovakia following the 1948 communist coup d'état. During their flight, they left their 6-year-old daughter Ivana, Veronika's mother, behind. The initial plan to get her out of the country following their escape failed, and it wasn't until 20 years later that they could meet again. This is when Ivana first met her sister Sandy, Dahlgren's mother, who had been born in the United States. Veronika's and Sandy's families were in contact and started visiting each other after the fall of communism in Czechoslovakia in 1989.

The Harok family learned about Dahlgren's plan to come to the Czech Republic only a couple of days in advance, when he contacted them, saying that he had already bought an airline ticket and that he expected them to pick him up at the airport. Indeed, they picked him up in Vienna, accommodated him in their home and were generally taking care of Dahlgren, who did not speak any Czech.

According to the authorities, Dahlgren sent SMS messages to other people on the day of the killing. At 8:33, he supposedly messaged a Harok family friend that he planned to return to the US. He canceled a class with a student whom he was tutoring in English two hours later. At 15:14, he messaged another Harok family friend saying the family had left for Vienna and that he would follow them there.

The authorities further claim that Dahlgren had been boasting about having managed to get a knife on board the airplane that brought him to Europe, and that he was seen walking in the vicinity of the victims' house with a knife in his hand two days before the killings.

Dahlgren's former babysitter, Shauna Seymour, described him as a trouble-free person. According to Garry O'Dell, Dahlgrens' family friend, Kevin denied responsibility for the murders. Dahlgren claimed that he had gone jogging and found the bodies after returning to the house. Scared for his own life, he wanted to get away as fast as possible.

== Extradition proceedings in Virginia ==
Five people are in the home. Four get killed. One flees. That alone, we submit, is probable cause.

— Assistant United States Attorney Patricia Haynes during extradition hearing, 12 September 2013

The Czech Ministry of Justice issued a request for preliminary custody of Kevin Dahlgren during the afternoon of 23 May 2013 on the basis of an international arrest warrant issued by a judge in the Municipal Court in Brno.

Dahlgren was arrested on the basis of the international arrest warrant immediately after landing in the United States on 23 May 2013. An application for Dahlgren to be placed in custody was brought by Assistant United States Attorney Patricia Haynes and approved by Magistrate Judge Theresa Carroll Buchanan the next day. The Czech authorities announced that they would seek Dahlgren's extradition. Under the Czech-US extradition treaty, they had 60 days to file a formal request (until 23 July 2013). Dahlgren was represented by Theodore Simon in extradition proceedings in Alexandria, Virginia.

While there have been numerous cases of extradition of third country nationals from either country to the other, there had never been a US citizen extradited by the US to the Czech Republic. According to the Czech Ministry of Justice, Dahlgren could not be prosecuted in the US for crimes committed abroad, and if not extradited, he would have walked free in the United States.

Dahlgren's legal representation had filed objections to the initial arrest, body search, and the handing over of Dahlgren's belongings to the Czech authorities. These objections were rejected.

The Czech Ministry of Justice filed the formal request for Dahlgren's extradition on 12 July 2013. Public Czech Television, which had obtained the 300 page extradition request from the US authorities, claimed that the evidence presented by the Czech police included the victims' DNA samples found on Dahlgren's clothing. The US authorities had already handed Dahlgren's belongings over to the Czech authorities, following his arrest in Washington, D.C.

The Czech police concluded that short trousers found in Dahlgren's suitcase had blood stains on them: the police alleged that "beyond any doubt, the blood was that of David Harok, and further with a very strong probability, also the blood of Martin Harok and Veronika Haroková. In the case of 25 stains examined, the blood could not have stained the short trousers merely from abrasion". The police had also secured a bloodied knife and a bar stool from the crime scene. However, according to the authorities, more weapons were used in the killings.

The extradition hearing took place on 12 September 2013 at United States District Court for the Eastern District of Virginia with Magistrate Judge Ivan D. Davis presiding. Concluding that the state needed to prove only probable cause, Davis ruled that Dahlgren could be extradited to the Czech Republic. The ruling, if upheld, allowed the US Department of State to only extradite him, while the Department of State would make its own decision whether to do so. Dahlgren's attorney, Theodore Simon announced that he would appeal the verdict. A court hearing in the matter that was supposed to take place on 8 May 2015 was adjourned. Another court hearing scheduled on 22 May 2015 - two years after the murders - was adjourned until 12 June 2015.

On 1 July 2015, the court in Virginia heard Dahlgren's filing for a writ of habeas corpus and decided that the detention was lawful. Dahlgren appealed the verdict. In August 2015, the court dealing with the extradition ruled that Dahlgren could be extradited without waiting for the verdict regarding his custody, and on 31 August 2015, Dahlgren was transported to Prague, becoming the first U.S. citizen extradited to the Czech Republic.

== Criminal proceedings in the Czech Republic ==
=== Charges ===
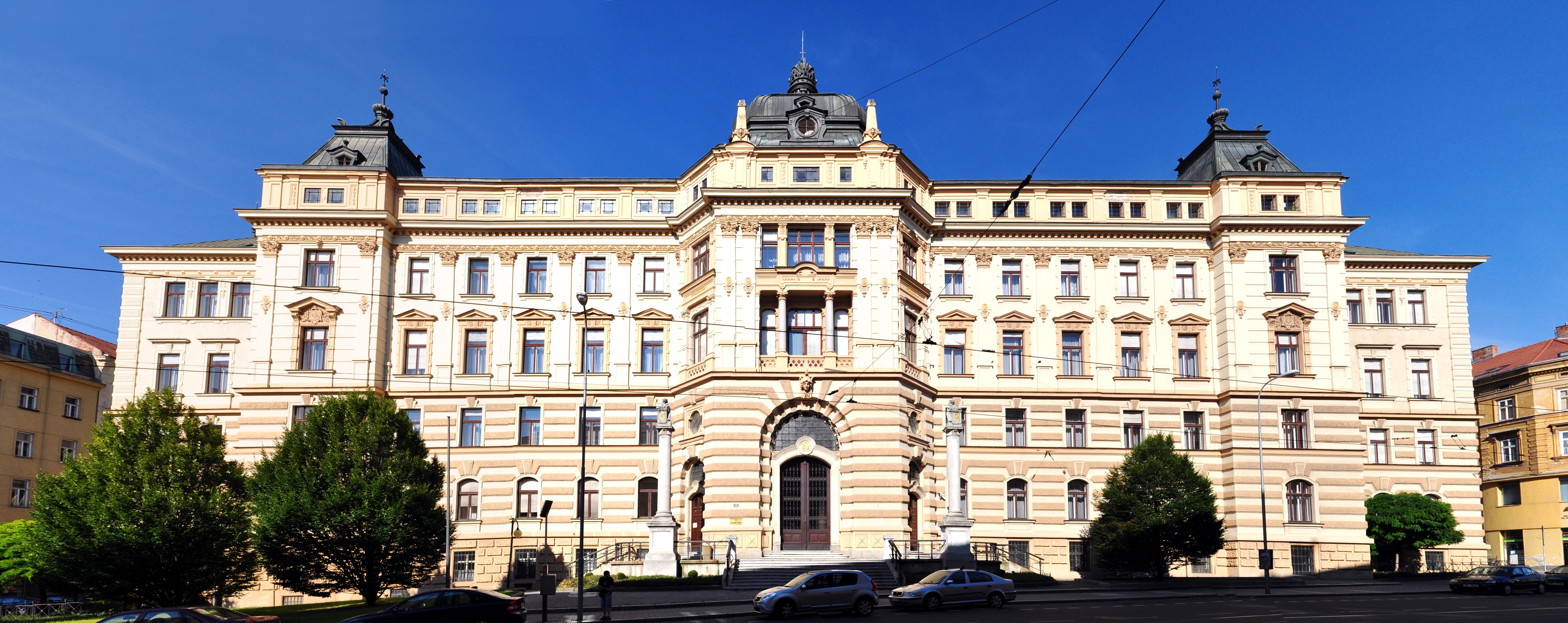
Palace of Justice in Brno which houses the regional court appropriate to hear the Harok family murder case.

After learning that their prime suspect had left the country, on 23 May 2013 the Czech authorities charged Kevin Dahlgren in absentia with committing the quadruple murder. If convicted, he could be sentenced up to life imprisonment. Court appointed attorney Richard Špíšek represented Dahlgren in the Czech murder proceedings.

Dahlgren was extradited to the Czech Republic on 31 August 2015. On the same day, the Regional Court in Brno held a hearing concerning Dahlgren's custody. The court refused Dahlgren's plea to be released on bail and ordered his remand. Dahlgren appealed the decision but the original ruling was upheld.

=== Indictment ===
After lengthy psychiatric and psychological assessments of Dahlgren's mental state, which concluded that he was sane, the police officially closed the investigation on 21 March 2016 and recommended the State Attorney indict Dahlgren. The investigators claimed that there was no doubt about Dahlgren committing the murders; however, they failed to establish a motive. State Attorney Ludmila Doležalová subsequently indicted Dahlgren in April 2016. The case fell into the hands of judge Michal Zámečník, who presided over a panel consisting of himself and two lay judges. Dahlgren chose to remain silent during the investigation as well as during most of the court hearings.

According to the indictment, a combination of Dahlgren's personal attributes and situational motivations led him to commit the murders: he was emotionally unstable and narcissistic, and he became aggressive when he found himself unable to fulfill the expectations of his relatives.

=== Trial ===
The first day of the trial consisted of personal testimonies of a number of witnesses, which included one of the victim's girlfriend who had left the house in the early morning before the murders, a mail carrier, house cleaner, neighbors who had entered the house in the evening after observing smoke, and other people who were text messaging either with the victims or with Dahlgren on the day of the killings. On the second day, more testimonies were, after the State Attorney's and Dahlgren's consent, read by the judge. This was followed by questioning of expert witnesses. According to a toxicology report, there were no drugs or alcohol in the blood of the victims. According to a sexologist testimony, Dahlgren was not a sadist, despite being interested in sadomasochism. His sexual orientation could not be determined due to his sexual immaturity.

The state attorney also presented Dahlgren's testimony before the FBI, given after his arrest in the US, in which he claimed that he got into a conflict with an unknown group of Russians or Romanians the night before the murders. After jogging the next morning, Dahlgren claimed to have found a note saying "we will find and kill you, American", after which he found the bodies in the house. Fearing for his own safety, he went to Vienna and flew to the US. Dahlgren's attorney declared the testimony inadmissible under Czech law due to the fact that there was no attorney present during the interrogation. Dahglren himself, through his interpreter, chose to remain silent on the issue, as he had also done when given a chance to cross-examine previous witnesses.

The afternoon hearing on the second day started by testimonies of pathologists. The youngest of the victims was incapacitated by a blow to the head with a blunt object, most probably a stone found by police, and subsequently stabbed multiple times, dying due to a cut throat. The father suffered 29 stab and slash wounds, including those made with an ax. Neither of the two victims could have been saved, even if given immediate aid, and both died within a minute of being attacked. The older son was murdered while lying in his bed, also suffering numerous stab and slash wounds to the head and neck. The mother suffered 29 stab wounds and died, most probably after several minutes, due to a stab wound to the neck. One stab wound hit her brain thus probably instantly incapacitating her.

A psychiatrist's testimony followed. While Dahlgren remained silent when questioned by police, he had cooperated with the psychiatrist who commented that she had examined Dahlgren several times longer than any other person before. According to her, Dahlgren suffered from mixed personality disorder, but not to such an extent he could be declared mentally ill during the murders. He had had a sexual relationship with a male classmate during his time in high school, and sexual relationships with women afterwards. Dahlgren had claimed to like animals more than people. Before going to Brno, Dahlgren was contemplating going to Africa instead in order to kill poachers there. In Brno, he first felt fine: however, later Mr. Harok Sr. started asking him to find a meaningful occupation, which meant that he was in the same position as back in the US. During repeated interviews with the psychiatrist, Dahlgren had spoken about his "internal voice" that told him what to do "in order to become a hero". This, however, did not reach a state of psychosis: according to the psychiatrist a person in the state of psychosis would not be able to commit the murders in the manner they were carried out (over several hours, with bodies being dragged to the garage, covered, and with an attempt to burn the house). The defense attorney criticized the psychiatrist claiming that American specialists found that he was suffering from bipolar-type schizoaffective disorder. The psychiatrist rejected that analysis, saying that she had spent more time with Dahlgren, collected much more data, and that Dahlgren had shown no symptoms of such a disorder during his long-term pre-trial custody.

The psychiatrist claimed that Dahlgren considered the Harok family a source of his stress, while he was indifferent to other persons including the girlfriend of one of the victims, a mail carrier, and a house cleaner who all made contact with Dahlgren either prior to or in between the killings. The psychiatrist was the first witness who was asked additional questions by Dahlgren; Dahlgren claimed he had been hearing voices in his head for two years every ten or fifteen seconds. Following this expert testimony, the defense attorney announced that the defense would order another expert witness testimony, while the judge adjourned the hearing until June 19.

Dahlgren was sentenced to life in prison on July 20, 2016, but appealed the verdict. In December 2016, the court asked for another medical opinion on Dahlgren's sanity. In March 2017, the original ruling was upheld.

== Death of Dahlgren ==
Dahlgren committed suicide in Valdice prison by hanging on 11 January 2018. An investigation of a prison guard who was on duty during Dahlgren's suicide and tasked with periodical checks of prisoners ended in June 2018 with no criminal charges.

== See also ==
- Randy Blythe manslaughter case
