= James Cacheris =

American judge (1933–2025)

James C. Cacheris
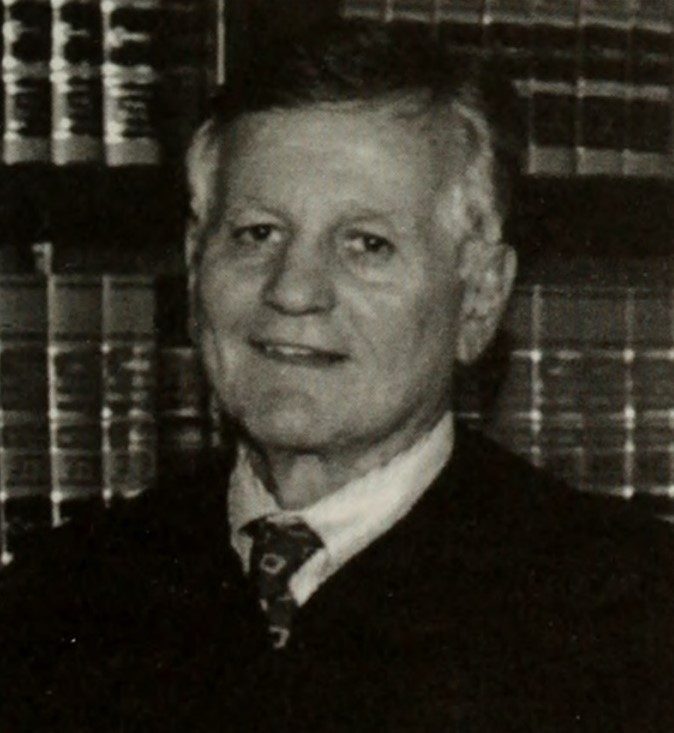

Senior Judge of the United States District Court for the Eastern District of Virginia
- In office March 30, 1998 – January 26, 2018

Judge of the United States Foreign Intelligence Surveillance Court
- In office September 10, 1993 – May 18, 2000
- Appointed by: William Rehnquist
- Preceded by: Herbert Frazier Murray
- Succeeded by: Claude M. Hilton

Chief Judge of the United States District Court for the Eastern District of Virginia
- In office 1991–1997
- Preceded by: Albert Vickers Bryan Jr.
- Succeeded by: Claude M. Hilton

Judge of the United States District Court for the Eastern District of Virginia
- In office December 1, 1981 – March 30, 1998
- Appointed by: Ronald Reagan
- Preceded by: Seat established by 92 Stat. 1629
- Succeeded by: Gerald Bruce Lee

Personal details
- Born: James Chris Cacheris; March 30, 1933 Pittsburgh, Pennsylvania, U.S.
- Died: April 29, 2025 (aged 92)
- Education: University of Pennsylvania (BS); George Washington University (JD)

James Chris Cacheris (March 30, 1933 – April 29, 2025) was a United States district judge of the United States District Court for the Eastern District of Virginia.

== Early life and education ==
Born in Pittsburgh, Cacheris was educated at the University of Pennsylvania where he earned a Bachelor of Science degree in 1955. He earned a Juris Doctor in 1960 from the George Washington University Law School.

== Career ==
Cacheris served as assistant corporation counsel from 1960 to 1962, in Washington, D.C., before entering private practice in 1962. He remained in private practice in Washington, D.C., and northern Virginia until 1971, when he became a judge of the 19th Judicial Circuit of Virginia, Fairfax Circuit Court.

=== Federal judicial service ===
Cacheris was nominated by President Ronald Reagan on October 20, 1981, to the United States District Court for the Eastern District of Virginia, to a new seat authorized by 92 Stat. 1629. He was confirmed by the United States Senate on November 24, 1981, and received a commission on December 1, 1981. He served as Chief Judge from 1991 to 1997. He assumed senior status on March 30, 1998, and was succeeded by Judge Gerald Bruce Lee. Cacheris served as a Judge of the Foreign Intelligence Surveillance Court from 1993 to 2000 and served as a Judge of the Alien Terrorist Removal Court from 2005 to 2016, serving as chief judge from 2006 to 2016. He retired from active service on January 26, 2018.

== Notable cases ==
Cacheris presided over several high-profile cases during his tenure on the United States District Court for the Eastern District of Virginia.

In Dickerson v. United States, Cacheris suppressed statements made by a bank robbery suspect that were obtained without full compliance with Miranda v. Arizona warnings, while finding the statements voluntary. The United States Court of Appeals for the Fourth Circuit reversed, holding that 18 U.S.C. § 3501 governed the admissibility of confessions rather than Miranda. The Supreme Court of the United States reversed the Fourth Circuit in 2000, reaffirming that Miranda is a constitutional rule that cannot be overruled by statute.

In United States v. Nicholson, Cacheris handled the prosecution of Harold James Nicholson, a senior Central Intelligence Agency officer charged with espionage for Russia. Cacheris denied a motion for recusal based on his prior service on the Foreign Intelligence Surveillance Court and denied a motion to suppress evidence obtained pursuant to the Foreign Intelligence Surveillance Act (FISA), upholding the constitutionality of FISA-authorized electronic surveillance and physical searches. Nicholson pleaded guilty and was sentenced to more than 23 years in prison.

In 2016, Cacheris sentenced Romanian hacker Marcel Lehel Lazăr (known as "Guccifer") to 52 months in prison following a guilty plea to unauthorized access to a protected computer and aggravated identity theft. Lazăr had gained unauthorized access to the email and social media accounts of approximately 100 Americans, including high-profile political figures, between 2012 and 2014.

In Jehovah v. Clarke, a pro se prisoner civil rights action under 42 U.S.C. § 1983, the Religious Land Use and Institutionalized Persons Act (RLUIPA), the First Amendment, and the Eighth Amendment, Judge Cacheris dismissed sua sponte the plaintiff's claims regarding Sabbath observance, cell assignments, and deliberate indifference to serious medical needs, and granted summary judgment to the defendants on the claim concerning a ban on communion wine (the prison enacted the ban after allowing inmates communion wine for over 40 years without a single incident or problem from doing so, and the inmate challenged such ban). After the inmate appealed arguing his points to the Fourth Circuit, in a published 2015 decision the Fourth Circuit reversed Judge Cacheris' decision in its entirety (over 40 different holdings were reversed) and remanded for further proceedings, holding that the plaintiff had stated plausible claims under RLUIPA and the First Amendment and that genuine issues of material fact precluded summary judgment on the communion wine claim.

Other notable matters included the 1992 conviction of fertility doctor Cecil B. Jacobson for fraud and perjury related to his clinic practices, and a 2011 ruling in a campaign finance case applying Citizens United v. FEC to hold that corporations could not be banned from making direct contributions within statutory limits applicable to individuals.

A 2018 Virginia General Assembly resolution commending Cacheris upon his retirement noted his involvement in high-profile cases including United States v. Jacobson, United States v. Russell, Williams v. Taylor, and United States v. Nicholson, as well as the upholding of his Dickerson ruling by the Supreme Court.

== Death ==
Cacheris died on April 29, 2025, at the age of 92.

Legal offices
| Preceded by Seat established by 92 Stat. 1629 | Judge of the United States District Court for the Eastern District of Virginia; 1981–1998 | Succeeded by Gerald Bruce Lee |
| Preceded by Albert Vickers Bryan Jr. | Chief Judge of the United States District Court for the Eastern District of Virginia; 1991–1997 | Succeeded by Claude M. Hilton |
| Preceded by Herbert Frazier Murray | Judge of the United States Foreign Intelligence Surveillance Court; 1993–2000 | Succeeded by Claude M. Hilton |
