= In re Petition for Naturalization of Horst Nemetz =

1981 US Court of Appeals case

- Court: United States Court of Appeals for the Fourth Circuit
- Full case name: In re Petition for Naturalization of Horst Nemetz
- Argued: December 5 1980
- Decided: April 24 1981
- Citation: 647 F.2d 432

Case history
- Prior history: 485 F.Supp. 470

Holding
- Admission of committing sodomy, though illegal in the jurisdiction in which petitioner resided, was not grounds for denial of petition for naturalization when sodomy was legal in other U.S. jurisdictions

Court membership
- Judges sitting: Harrison Lee Winter, James Marshall Sprouse, Samuel James Ervin III

Case opinions
- Majority: Ervin, joined by Winter & Sprouse

Laws applied
- 8 U.S.C. § 1427

In re Petition for Naturalization of Horst Nemetz was a 1981 naturalization case decided by the United States Court of Appeals for the Fourth Circuit, involving whether a petitioner for naturalization, who admitted to committing sodomy—at that time illegal in Virginia, his state of residence—could be denied naturalization on the ground that he was not of good moral character, when the same activity was not prohibited in other U.S. states.

Horst Nemetz was admitted into the United States lawfully in 1967. During the 10 years he had been living in the US, in Virginia, he lived with a male “roommate”. During his trial it became known that the two were part of a monogamous homosexual relationship. One of the requirements for Naturalization was to prove that you were of good moral character. This fact brought into question for the courts whether Nemetz was in fact of good moral character. The first trial was with the U.S. District Court for the Eastern District of Virginia who denied Therefore, Nemetz admitting to the relationship with his roommate caused for speculation in illegal activity and being of bad moral character.

== Original petition for Naturalization ==
Nemetz petitioned for naturalization in 1980 and was at first denied naturalization based being a person of bad moral character. Nemetz admitted to his relationship with his roommate and explained that all of their sexual activities took place within their home. The following is part of the questioning that occurred:

Q: Mr. Nemetz, are you now or have you ever been a homosexual?
A: I’m now.
Q: Have you ever had sexual relations with your roommate?
A: Well we have a relationship. I like him.
Q: Have you ever had sexual relationships with him?
A: What do you mean sexual relationships?
Q: Intimate relationships. Getting into Sexual aspects.
Q: Either yes or no.
A: Yes.
…
Q: So what you’re saying is that your relationship in the United States has been with one individual. Is that correct?
A: Yes.
Q: And no others?
A: That’s right. Yeah.
Q: And in your lifetime that is the only individual you’ve had a relationship of this type with?

== Appeals case ==
Nemetz took the appeals case to a higher court, The Court of Appeals for the Fourth Circuit, who looked at the case logically by setting aside the possible sodomy, which was still illegal in Virginia at the time. The previous court felt that even the possibility of sodomy occurring proved that Nemetz wasn't of good character. Nemetz proved that any interaction between himself and his roommate happened in the privacy of their own home and was not a threat to the public. Their conclusion was that naturalization requires national law therefore federal law must be used for the case. Since sodomy was not illegal across the country or under federal law, there was nothing to hold Nemetz back from naturalization.
