= Joseph Calvitt Clarke Jr. =

American judge (1920–2004)

Senior Judge of the United States District Court for the Eastern District of Virginia
- In office July 31, 1991 – May 6, 2004

Judge of the United States District Court for the Eastern District of Virginia
- In office December 20, 1974 – July 31, 1991
- Appointed by: Gerald Ford
- Preceded by: Walter Edward Hoffman
- Succeeded by: Robert E. Payne

Personal details
- Born: Joseph Calvitt Clarke Jr. August 9, 1920 Harrisburg, Pennsylvania, U.S.
- Died: May 6, 2004 (aged 83) Virginia Beach, Virginia, U.S.
- Resting place: Hollywood Cemetery
- Education: University of Virginia (B.S.); University of Virginia School of Law (LL.B.)

Joseph Calvitt Clarke Jr. (August 9, 1920 – May 6, 2004) was a United States district judge of the United States District Court for the Eastern District of Virginia.

== Education and career ==
Clarke was born on August 9, 1920, in Harrisburg, Pennsylvania. He received a Bachelor of Science degree from the University of Virginia in 1945 and a Bachelor of Laws from the University of Virginia School of Law in 1945. He was in private practice in Richmond, Virginia, from 1945 to 1975.

== Federal judicial service ==
On December 11, 1974, Clarke was nominated by President Gerald Ford to a seat on the United States District Court for the Eastern District of Virginia vacated by Judge Walter Edward Hoffman. He was confirmed by the United States Senate on December 19, 1974, and received his commission on December 20, 1974. He assumed senior status on July 31, 1991. He served in that capacity until his death on May 6, 2004, in Virginia Beach, Virginia. He was buried in Hollywood Cemetery.

== Sources ==
Legal offices
Preceded by Walter Edward Hoffman	Judge of the United States District Court for the Eastern District of Virginia; 1974–1991	Succeeded by Robert E. Payne
