= Albert Vickers Bryan Jr. =

American judge (1926–2019)

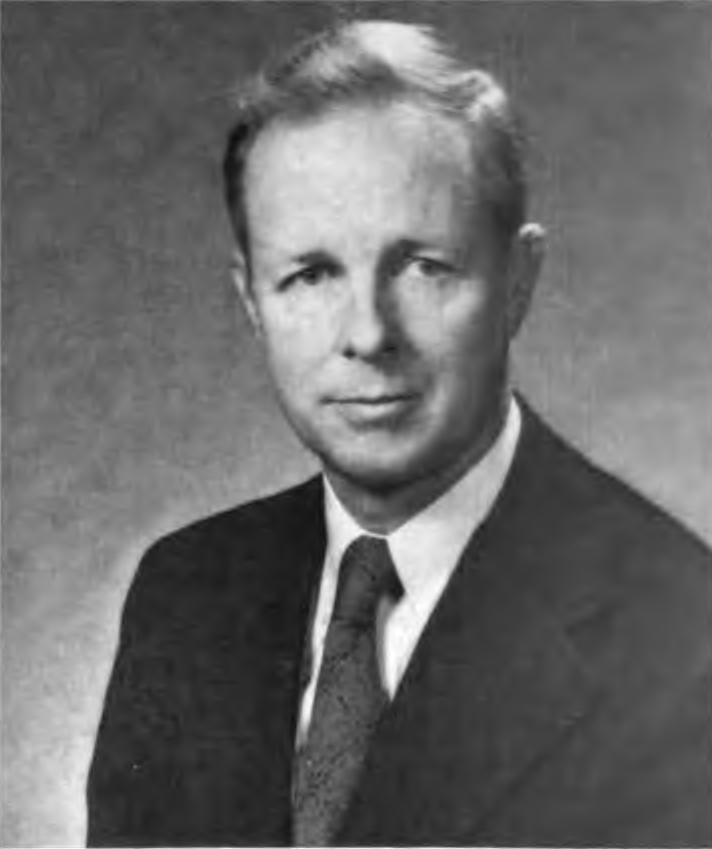

Senior Judge of the United States District Court for the Eastern District of Virginia
- In office December 1, 1991 – August 27, 2019

Chief Judge of the United States District Court for the Eastern District of Virginia
- In office 1985–1991
- Preceded by: John Ashton MacKenzie
- Succeeded by: James C. Cacheris

Judge of the United States Foreign Intelligence Surveillance Court
- In office May 19, 1979 – May 18, 1986
- Appointed by: Warren Burger
- Preceded by: seat established
- Succeeded by: Herbert Frazier Murray

Judge of the United States District Court for the Eastern District of Virginia
- In office July 29, 1971 – December 1, 1991
- Appointed by: Richard Nixon
- Preceded by: Seat established by 84 Stat. 294
- Succeeded by: Leonie Brinkema

Personal details
- Born: November 8, 1926 Alexandria, Virginia, U.S.
- Died: August 27, 2019 (aged 92) Alexandria, Virginia, U.S.
- Education: University of Virginia School of Law (LLB)

Albert Vickers Bryan Jr. (November 8, 1926 – August 27, 2019) was a United States district judge of the United States District Court for the Eastern District of Virginia.

== Education and career ==
Born in Alexandria, Virginia, Bryan's father Albert Vickers Bryan, was also a federal judge. The Albert V. Bryan United States Courthouse, in Alexandria, is named for his father. The younger Bryan served in the United States Marine Corps reserve from 1944 to 1946, and then received a Bachelor of Laws from the University of Virginia School of Law in 1950. He was in private practice of law in Alexandria from 1950 to 1962. He was a judge of the 16th Judicial Circuit of Virginia from 1962 to 1971.

=== Federal judicial service ===
Bryan was nominated by President Richard Nixon on July 19, 1971, to a new seat on the United States District Court for the Eastern District of Virginia created by 84 Stat. 294. He was confirmed by the United States Senate on July 29, 1971, and received his commission the same day. He served as Chief Judge from 1985 until December 1, 1991, when he assumed senior status. His service terminated on August 27, 2019, due to his death of pneumonia in Alexandria.

In 1979, Bryan was selected by Chief Justice Warren Burger as one of the seven original members of the Foreign Intelligence Surveillance Court, and he served on that court until 1986.

=== Rocket docket ===
While serving as a federal judge, Bryan decided that justice was being dispensed too slowly for his liking, and as a result he ran a rocket docket.

== Notable cases ==
- United States v. LaRouche (1988)
- French Quarter Cafe v. Virginia Alcoholic Beverage Control Board (1991)
- Harvey v. Horan (2001)

== See also ==
- List of United States federal judges by longevity of service

== Sources ==
- Political Graveyard

Legal offices
Preceded by Seat established by 84 Stat. 294	Judge of the United States District Court for the Eastern District of Virginia; 1971–1991	Succeeded by Leonie Brinkema
New seat	Judge of the United States Foreign Intelligence Surveillance Court; 1979–1986	Succeeded by Herbert Frazier Murray
Preceded by John Ashton MacKenzie	Chief Judge of the United States District Court for the Eastern District of Virginia; 1985–1991	Succeeded by James C. Cacheris
