= Leonie Brinkema =

American federal judge (born 1944)

Judge of the United States District Court for the Eastern District of Virginia
- Incumbent
- Assumed office October 20, 1993
- Appointed by: Bill Clinton
- Preceded by: Albert Vickers Bryan Jr.

Magistrate Judge of the United States District Court for the Eastern District of Virginia
- In office 1985–1993

Personal details
- Born: Leonie Helen Milhomme; June 26, 1944 (age 82) Teaneck, New Jersey, U.S.
- Education: Rutgers University (BA, MLS); Cornell University (JD)

Leonie Helen Milhomme Brinkema (born June 26, 1944) is an American lawyer and jurist serving as a United States district judge of the U.S. District Court for the Eastern District of Virginia. She was appointed in 1993 by President Bill Clinton.

== Early life and education ==
Brinkema was born Leonie Milhomme in Teaneck, New Jersey, and was raised in Teaneck, Englewood and Tenafly, where she attended Tenafly High School. She received a Bachelor of Arts degree from Rutgers University in 1966 and a Master of Library and Information Science from the same institution in 1970. She earned a Juris Doctor from Cornell Law School in 1976.

== Career ==
From 1976 to 1977, Brinkema worked in the United States Department of Justice Criminal Division's Public Integrity Section. She then worked in the United States Attorney's office in the Eastern District of Virginia, Criminal Division from 1977 to 1983. From 1983 to 1984, she returned to the Criminal Division and worked as a sole practitioner from 1984 to 1985.

=== Federal judicial service ===
Brinkema was a United States Magistrate Judge in the Eastern District of Virginia from 1985 to 1993.

On August 6, 1993, President Bill Clinton nominated Brinkema to a seat on the United States District Court for the Eastern District of Virginia vacated by Judge Albert Vickers Bryan Jr. She was confirmed by the United States Senate on October 18, 1993, and received her commission on October 20, 1993. She took up her post on October 23, 1993.

=== Notable rulings ===
- Brinkema presided over RTC v. Lerma et al. (1995), a case that involved the reproduction of materials owned by the Church of Scientology. Brinkema found for the defendants in most of the claims, and awarded minimum damages of $2,500 for copyright infringement, citing the "increasingly vitriolic rhetoric" of Religious Technology Center (RTC)'s legal filings.
- On October 28, 2003, she sentenced al-Qaeda operative Iyman Faris to twenty years imprisonment for providing material support to the group.
- In 2006, Brinkema presided over the case of 9/11 conspirator Zacarias Moussaoui. When she asked about the videotapes showing the interrogation of Abu Zubaydah, the government denied their existence. As she sentenced Moussaoui to life in a supermax prison, she told him: "You came here to be a martyr and to die in a great big bang of glory, but to paraphrase the poet T. S. Eliot, instead, you will die with a whimper. The rest of your life you will spend in prison." Mr. Moussaoui began to respond, but Judge Brinkema continued. "You will never again get a chance to speak," she said, "and that is an appropriate and fair ending."
- On April 2, 2009, Brinkema weighed in on the question of whether terrorist detainees at the Guantanamo Bay detention camp could be prosecuted in the civilian justice system.
- In 2011, she presided over the fraud trial of Lee Farkas, CEO of Taylor, Bean & Whitaker. During his sentencing hearing on June 30, 2011, she said that she did not observe any genuine remorse, and sentenced the 58-year-old Farkas to 30 years in federal prison. She ordered Farkas and six others to pay a total of about US$3.5 billion in restitution.
- She was the judge dealing with CIA officer John Kiriakou's whistleblower case, where she sentenced him to 30 months.
- On January 28, 2017, she was the second to order a stay of an executive order by President Donald Trump, which restricted immigration into the United States and prevented the return of green-card holders and others. Although the order issued was a temporary restraining order, it blocked the removal of any green-card holders being detained at Dulles International Airport for seven days. Brinkema's action also ordered that lawyers have access to those held there because of the president's ban.
- In 2011, Brinkema sentenced Lee Farkas to 30 years in federal prison for the multi-billion dollar collapse of Taylor, Bean & Whitaker (TBW) and Colonial BancGroup, with Colonial having knowingly become a financing partner in Farkas' fraudulent business operations at TBW starting in 2002. However Judge Brinkema turned around and released him on 29 September 2020 after serving only 9 years, just in case Farkas were to catch the COVID-19 virus in prison. When met with opposition from the prosecution, Brinkema stated in her decision that she wasn't "at all concerned about the interests of justice not being served."
- On March 28, 2025, Brinkema ordered the release of a Venezuelan couple who received temporary protected status after illegally crossing the border in 2022, but who were arrested in front of their children by ICE on March 21, which sparked fears that the Trump administration was again willing to separate families as part of its immigration initiatives. Brinkema rejected the description of the woman that Erik Weiss, an assistant director of a U.S. Immigration and Customs Enforcement field office in Washington, had offered in a court filing, in which he called her an "affiliate" of the gang and later as a "senior member," which Brinkema said was solely on account of her being married to a member of that gang. Brinkema stated, "Is somebody an affiliate because he or she is married to a member of the gang?" She later questioned how the government could describe her as such, or as a threat to public safety, stating, "This is a terrible, terrible affidavit." Brinkema said that Weiss's assertion was "pure hearsay," "assumptions," and constituted "putting words in people's mouths," and told the Trump administration's attorney, "If this was a criminal case, I'd throw you out of my chambers."
- On April 17, 2025, she ruled that Google illegally monopolized online advertising markets. She found Google liable for "willfully acquiring and maintaining monopoly power" in markets for publisher ad servers and the market for ad exchanges which sit between buyers and sellers.
- On May 29, 2026, Brinkema issued a ruling which temporarily blocked U.S. President Donald Trump's proposed $1.8 billion "anti weaponization" fund which included people who participated in the January 6 United States Capitol attack of 2021. The Trump administration agreed to comply with this order on June 1, 2026.

== See also ==
- Ali al-Tamimi
- 2005 CIA interrogation tapes destruction
- List of United States federal judges by longevity of service

Legal offices
Preceded by Albert Vickers Bryan Jr.	Judge of the United States District Court for the Eastern District of Virginia; 1993–present	Incumbent
