= John A. Gibney Jr. =

American judge (born 1951)

Senior Judge of the United States District Court for the Eastern District of Virginia
- Incumbent
- Assumed office November 1, 2021

Judge of the United States District Court for the Eastern District of Virginia
- In office December 17, 2010 – November 1, 2021
- Appointed by: Barack Obama
- Preceded by: Robert E. Payne
- Succeeded by: Elizabeth Hanes

Personal details
- Born: John Adrian Gibney Jr. October 27, 1951 (age 74) Coatesville, Pennsylvania, U.S.
- Education: College of William & Mary (BA); University of Virginia (JD)

John Adrian Gibney Jr. (born October 27, 1951) is a senior United States district judge of the United States District Court for the Eastern District of Virginia.

== Early life and education ==
Born in Coatesville, Pennsylvania, Gibney received a Bachelor of Arts degree in English from The College of William & Mary in 1973 and a Juris Doctor from the University of Virginia School of Law in 1976. From 1976 until 1978, Gibney served as a law clerk for Justice Harry L. Carrico of the Supreme Court of Virginia.

== Career ==
From 1978 until 1982, Gibney was an associate at the now-dissolved Richmond, Virginia law firm Bell, Lacy & Baliles. From 1982 until 1984, Gibney served in the office of the attorney general for the commonwealth of Virginia in the litigation section as an assistant attorney general. From 1984 until 1987, he served as an associate at the now-dissolved Richmond law firm Lacy & Mehfoud. From 1987 until 2003, Gibney served as a shareholder (partner) in the Richmond law firm Shuford, Rubin & Gibney. From 2003 until his confirmation as a federal judge, he served as a partner and a civil litigator in the Richmond law firm Thompson McMullan. From 2005 to 2010, he was an adjunct professor at the University of Richmond School of Law.

=== Federal judicial service ===
On September 30, 2009, Virginia Senators Jim Webb and Mark Warner recommended Gibney for a seat on the United States District Court for the Eastern District of Virginia. On April 14, 2010, President Obama nominated Gibney to the seat that had been created by the retirement of Judge Robert E. Payne, who assumed senior status in May 2007. The United States Senate confirmed Gibney's nomination on December 16, 2010 by a voice vote, during the lame duck session of the 111th Congress. He received his commission on December 17, 2010. He assumed senior status on November 1, 2021.

On January 22, 2026, Gibney ruled in King v. O'Bannon that Virginia may not disenfranchise people "whose convictions stem from felonies created after 1870, when Congress passed the Virginia Readmission Act... The injunctive ruling refranchises those with convictions for drug offenses, which weren’t in consideration in the 1870 law." The Act was a successor to the Reconstruction Acts. Other former Confederate states have similar laws and a similar path to change. Virginia had expanded its anti-felon laws as recently as 1971, "in 1971, Virginia’s newly adopted constitution explicitly allowed the disenfranchisement of anyone convicted of a felony."

Legal offices
Preceded by Robert E. Payne	Judge of the United States District Court for the Eastern District of Virginia; 2010–2021	Succeeded by Elizabeth Hanes
