= Claude M. Hilton =

American judge (born 1940)

Senior Judge of the United States District Court for the Eastern District of Virginia
- Incumbent
- Assumed office December 31, 2005

Judge of the United States Foreign Intelligence Surveillance Court
- In office May 19, 2000 – May 18, 2007
- Appointed by: William Rehnquist
- Preceded by: James Cacheris
- Succeeded by: Roger Vinson

Chief Judge of the United States District Court for the Eastern District of Virginia
- In office 1997–2004
- Preceded by: James C. Cacheris
- Succeeded by: James R. Spencer

Judge of the United States District Court for the Eastern District of Virginia
- In office July 11, 1985 – December 31, 2005
- Appointed by: Ronald Reagan
- Preceded by: Seat established by 98 Stat. 333
- Succeeded by: Liam O'Grady

Commissioner in Chancery for the Circuit Court of Arlington County, Virginia
- In office 1976–1985

Commonwealth Attorney of Arlington County, Virginia
- In office 1974–1975

Personal details
- Born: Claude Meredith Hilton; December 8, 1940 (age 85) Scott County, Virginia, U.S.
- Spouse: Joretta Cabaniss
- Education: Ohio State University (BS); American University (JD)

Claude Meredith Hilton (born December 8, 1940) is a senior United States district judge of the United States District Court for the Eastern District of Virginia.

== Education and career ==
Born in Scott County, Virginia, Hilton spent his earliest childhood largely outdoors on his family's farm and raised an adopted fox. His family later moved to Dayton, Ohio and he eventually received a Bachelor of Science degree from Ohio State University in 1963 while working as a men's clothier clerk at the Lazarus Department Store.

He achieved a Juris Doctor from the Washington College of Law at American University in 1966, and married his wife Joretta.

He was an assistant commonwealth's attorney of Arlington, Virginia, from 1967 to 1968. He was in private practice in Arlington from 1968 to 1973, was the Commonwealth's Attorney for Arlington County from 1974 to 1975, and returned to private practice from 1976 to 1985. He was also a commissioner in chancery for the Circuit Court of Arlington County from 1976 to 1985.

=== Federal judicial service ===
On May 15, 1985, Hilton was nominated by President Ronald Reagan to a new seat on the United States District Court for the Eastern District of Virginia. He was confirmed by the United States Senate on July 10, 1985.

Hilton served as chief judge from 1997 to 2004, assuming senior status on December 31, 2005. In May 2000, Chief Justice William Rehnquist appointed Hilton as a judge on the Foreign Intelligence Surveillance Court (FISC). His term on the FISC expired on May 18, 2007.

As of December 2025, Hilton, who sat in Alexandria, appears to be inactive.

Legal offices
Preceded by Seat established by 98 Stat. 333	Judge of the United States District Court for the Eastern District of Virginia; 1985–2005	Succeeded by Liam O'Grady
Preceded by James C. Cacheris	Chief Judge of the United States District Court for the Eastern District of Virginia; 1997–2004	Succeeded by James R. Spencer
Preceded by James Cacheris	Judge of the United States Foreign Intelligence Surveillance Court; 2000–2007	Succeeded by Roger Vinson
