= Rocket docket =

Colloquial term for a judicial court known for expedited proceedings

A rocket docket is a court or other tribunal that is noted for its speedy disposition of cases and controversies that come before it, often by maintaining strict adherence to the law as pertains to filing deadlines, etc.

The term was originally applied to the United States District Court for the Eastern District of Virginia, after Judge Albert V. Bryan Jr., who ran the federal courthouse in Alexandria, decided that justice was being dispensed too slowly for his liking. The court earned the nickname among attorneys practicing there in the 1970s, who told stories of Bryan ruling on the spot when motions were argued, and trying entire cases in one afternoon. As of September 2011, the Eastern District of Virginia had the shortest average time from filing to disposition for civil cases that went to trial (at 12.1 months) and was second (behind the Eastern District of Pennsylvania) in median time for resolution of all civil cases.

Later the term was applied to the United States District Court for the Eastern District of Texas. Other jurisdictions that have been characterized as rocket dockets include the United States District Court for the Northern District of California; the United States District Court for the Southern District of California; the United States District Court for the Northern District of Georgia; and the United States District Court for the Western District of Wisconsin.

The U.S. Patent & Trademark Office has designated its expedited examination of design patent applications as a rocket docket.

In Jefferson County (Louisville), Kentucky a team of prosecutors is assigned to the Progressive Criminal Justice Plan, referred to as the "rocket docket," for speedy resolution of certain criminal matters.

Another notable "rocket docket" court involved Lee County, Florida (Fort Myers), home of numerous foreclosure proceedings due to the collapse of the Florida housing market as a result of the 2008 financial crisis, part of the 2010 United States foreclosure crisis. On some days, the court heard up to 1,000 cases per day; assuming an 8-hour day, this equates to less than 30 seconds per case. The entire case frequently consists of two questions: whether the homeowner is behind on payments, and whether they are still in the house. If yes, the judge allows the homeowner 60 days to come to an agreement with the bank for payments or lose the house.
