= Cable News Network L.P. v. CNNews.com =

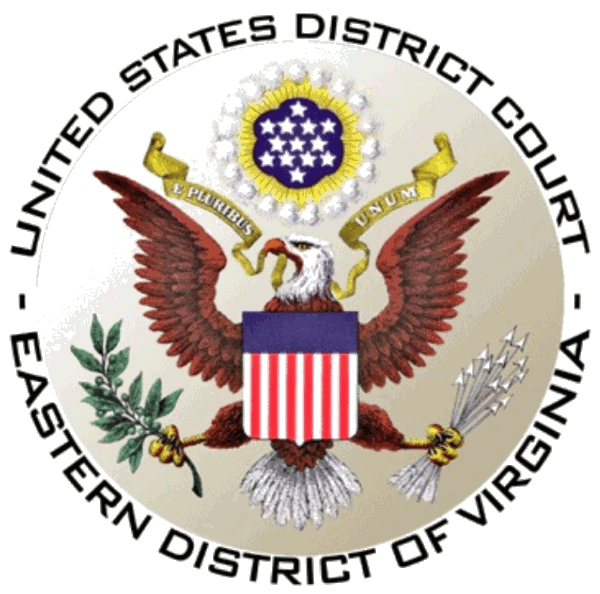
- Court: United States District Court for the Eastern District of Virginia
- Full case name: Cable News Network L.P. v. CNNews.com
- Decided: September 18, 2001
- Citation: 162 F.Supp.2d 484

Holding
- The Anticybersquatting Consumer Protection Act requires a show of bad faith.

Case opinions
- Majority: T. S. Ellis III

Laws applied
- Cybersquatting, Lanham Act, United States trademark law

Cable News Network L.P. v. CNNews.com, 162 F.Supp.2d 484 (2001), was a trademark law case of the United States District Court for the Eastern District of Virginia, over the use of a registered trademark owned by an American company in the web address of a foreign company. The court ruled that a foreign firm's use of an American trademark in a web address could be a violation of the Anticybersquatting Consumer Protection Act, but such a violation requires a show of bad faith.

== Background ==
Cable News Network had owned the American trademark for the acronym "CNN" since 1980, and in the late 1990s registered the domain name "cnn.com" for its website. In 1999, Maya Online Broadband Network of China, a subsidiary of Shanghai Online Broadband Network Co. Ltd., registered the domain name "cnnews.com" with Network Solutions for use worldwide. The Chinese firm claimed that the "cn" in the domain name utilized a widely-known abbreviation for China, while Cable News Network claimed that the first three letters of the offending domain name violated its trademark for the "cnn" acronym and could cause confusion among Internet users. The Chinese firm noted that it planned to use the "cnnews.com" site only in China and with content only in the Chinese language, and that this would not cause confusion because few people in China were familiar with the American CNN.

== Opinion ==
The district court set to determine if the Anticybersquatting Consumer Protection Act (ACPA) allowed Cable News Network to seek damages for trademark infringement. The court also had to determine if it had in rem jurisdiction, which requires a domain name to be considered an item of property owned by a party within its territory. Per U.S. Supreme Court precedents, this type of jurisdiction requires that the defendant who is accused of infringing on the property must have minimum contacts within the court's territory. The district court found that it had jurisdiction because the site "cnnews.com" could be accessed by Internet users within its geographical territory.

The district court then had to determine if the Chinese company had violated the ACPA in bad faith. The court found that this was not the case; but in a separate proceeding, ordered the Chinese company to transfer the "cnnews.com" domain name to Cable News Network due to likelihood of confusion under the ACPA.

== Impact ==
Cable News Network L.P. v. CNNews.com has been cited as an important early ruling on the law of domain names as property, and the implications of domain names using terms that are trademarked in a particular country but visible to Internet users around the world. It has also been named as an important early precedent on the matter of establishing minimum contacts for Internet usage, with the availability of a website to users within a court's territory found to be sufficient for jurisdiction.
