= John D. Butzner Jr. =

American judge (1917–2006)

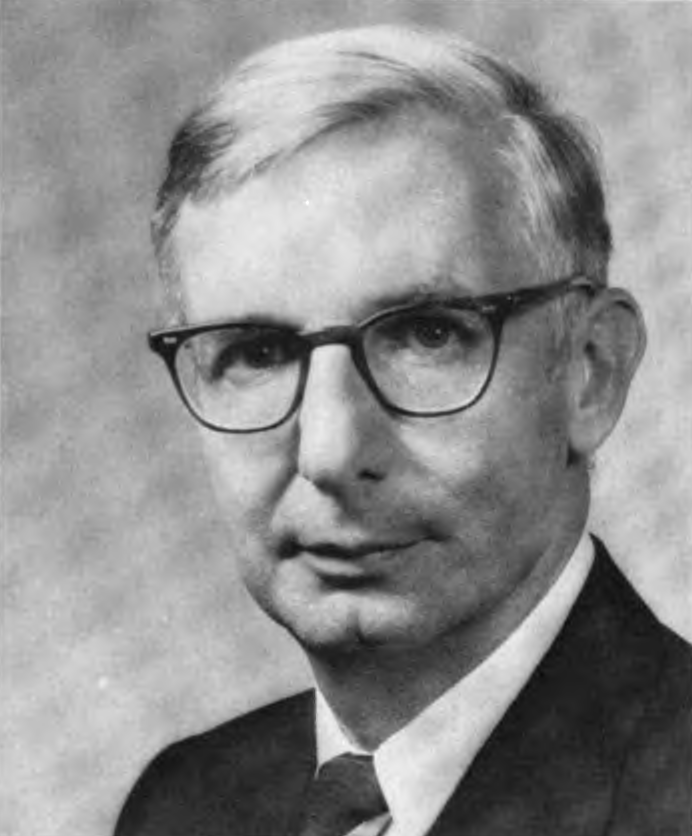

Senior Judge of the United States Court of Appeals for the Fourth Circuit
- In office November 1, 1982 – January 20, 2006

Judge of the United States Court of Appeals for the Fourth Circuit
- In office July 31, 1967 – November 1, 1982
- Appointed by: Lyndon B. Johnson
- Preceded by: J. Spencer Bell
- Succeeded by: J. Harvie Wilkinson III

Judge of the United States District Court for the Eastern District of Virginia
- In office June 20, 1962 – August 1, 1967
- Appointed by: John F. Kennedy
- Preceded by: Albert Vickers Bryan
- Succeeded by: Robert R. Merhige Jr.

Personal details
- Born: John Decker Butzner Jr. October 2, 1917 Scranton, Pennsylvania, US
- Died: January 20, 2006 (aged 88) Richmond, Virginia, US
- Education: University of Scranton (BA); University of Virginia School of Law (LLB)

John Decker Butzner Jr. (October 2, 1917 – January 20, 2006) was a United States circuit judge of the United States Court of Appeals for the Fourth Circuit and previously was a United States district judge of the United States District Court for the Eastern District of Virginia.

== Education and career ==
Born on October 2, 1917, in Scranton, Pennsylvania, Butzner began to become interested in the law when, as a child, he visited his uncle Billy Butzner, an attorney. He received a Bachelor of Arts degree, magna cum laude, in 1938 from the University of Scranton and a Bachelor of Laws in 1941 from the University of Virginia School of Law, where he served on the board of editors of the Virginia Law Review. He entered private practice in Fredericksburg, Virginia from 1941 to 1942, with his uncle's firm of Butzner & Hicks. He was a United States Air Force staff sergeant in the Weather Service from 1942 to 1945, serving in Alaska, returning to private practice in Fredericksburg from 1946 to 1958. He served as an Associate Judge of the Virginia Circuit Court for the Fifteenth Judicial Circuit from 1958 to 1960. He served as a Judge of the Virginia Circuit Court for the Thirty-Ninth Judicial Circuit from 1960 to 1962.

=== Personal ===
Butzner's sister, Jane Jacobs, was a leading twentieth century urbanist and reformer. Butzner married Viola Peterson within two years of the end of his military service.

== Federal judicial service ==
Butzner was nominated by President John F. Kennedy on May 15, 1962, to a seat on the United States District Court for the Eastern District of Virginia vacated by Judge Albert Vickers Bryan. He was confirmed by the United States Senate on June 15, 1962, and received his commission on June 20, 1962. His service terminated on August 1, 1967, due to elevation to the Fourth Circuit.

Butzner was nominated by President Lyndon B. Johnson on June 27, 1967, to a seat on the United States Court of Appeals for the Fourth Circuit vacated by Judge J. Spencer Bell. He was confirmed by the Senate on July 31, 1967, and received his commission on July 31, 1967. He assumed senior status on November 1, 1982. He took inactive senior status in 2000. His service terminated on January 20, 2006, due to his death in Richmond, Virginia, after a lengthy illness.

== Kenneth Starr ==
Butzner served on the three-judge panel that appointed Kenneth W. Starr as independent counsel investigating Bill Clinton. He was interviewed by Ken Gormley for his 2010 book on the Clinton scandals, The Death of American Virtue: Clinton vs. Starr. Janet Maslin of the New York Times, in her review of the book, says "Breathing with the help of an oxygen tube and with his speech severely impaired, Judge Butzner is able to utter only one complete sentence: 'I was against Starr, from start to finish.'"

== Honor ==
In 1976, Butzner received the Distinguished Service Award from the Virginia Trial Lawyers Association.

== Sources ==
Legal offices
Preceded by Albert Vickers Bryan	Judge of the United States District Court for the Eastern District of Virginia; 1962–1967	Succeeded by Robert R. Merhige Jr.
Preceded by J. Spencer Bell	Judge of the United States Court of Appeals for the Fourth Circuit; 1967–1982	Succeeded by J. Harvie Wilkinson III
