= John Ashton MacKenzie =

American judge

Senior Judge of the United States District Court for the Eastern District of Virginia
- In office November 30, 1985 – January 30, 1998

Chief Judge of the United States District Court for the Eastern District of Virginia
- In office 1979–1985
- Preceded by: Richard Boykin Kellam
- Succeeded by: Albert Vickers Bryan Jr.

Judge of the United States District Court for the Eastern District of Virginia
- In office August 25, 1967 – November 30, 1985
- Appointed by: Lyndon B. Johnson
- Preceded by: Seat established by 80 Stat. 75
- Succeeded by: James R. Spencer

Member of the Virginia House of Delegates from Portsmouth
- In office January 13, 1954 – January 8, 1958
- Preceded by: William H. W. Cassell
- Succeeded by: Inez D. Baker

Personal details
- Born: September 17, 1917 Portsmouth, Virginia
- Died: January 1, 2010 (aged 92) Portsmouth, Virginia
- Party: Democratic
- Education: Washington and Lee University; School of Law (LL.B.)

John Ashton MacKenzie (September 17, 1917 – January 1, 2010) was a Virginia lawyer, Coast Guard officer and politician who became United States district judge of the United States District Court for the Eastern District of Virginia.

== Early life and education ==
Born in Portsmouth, Virginia, to Henry William MacKenzie and his wife, the former Clare Maupin Ashton, young MacKenzie was educated in the local public schools (his maternal great-grandfather having been the city's first public school superintendent after the American Civil War), including the then-segregated Woodrow Wilson High School. He had an elder brother, Henry, and two sisters. Following his brother's example, he traveled to Lexington, Virginia for college and law school, receiving a Bachelor of Laws from Washington and Lee University School of Law in 1939.

== Legal career ==
Following admission to the Virginia bar, MacKenzie had a private legal practice in Portsmouth from 1939 to 1967. He also served as an officer in the United States Coast Guard during World War II, from 1941 to 1946. He was an associate judge of the Municipal Court of Portsmouth from 1952 to 1962, during the last several years of which his brother was an associate judge of the Circuit Court for Portsmouth as well as Princess Anne and Isle of Wight counties.

Portsmouth voters elected and re-elected MacKenzie to represent them in the Virginia House of Delegates (part-time) from 1954 to 1958. MacKenzie also served as president of the Portsmouth Assembly from 1950 to 1955, and as president of the Portsmouth Chamber of Commerce in 1967. In 1968, the local Moose lodge selected him as Portsmouth's "First Citizen" for his accomplishments on behalf of the city.

== Federal judicial service ==
On July 17, 1967, President Lyndon B. Johnson nominated MacKenzie to a new seat on the United States District Court for the Eastern District of Virginia created by 80 Stat. 75. He was confirmed by the United States Senate on August 18, 1967, and received his commission on August 25, 1967. He served three decades, including as Chief Judge from 1979 to 1985. MacKenzie assumed senior status on November 30, 1985, serving in that capacity until his retirement from the bench, on January 30, 1998. MacKenzie died on January 1, 2010, in Portsmouth.

== Personal life ==
MacKenzie married Elizabeth Nash during World War II, and during their 61-year marriage they raised a son and daughter. Mackenzie served as chairman of the Eastern Virginia Council of Boy Scouts in 1972-1972, and was also active in Trinity Episcopal Church, including service on the vestry.

== Sources ==
Legal offices
Preceded by Seat established by 80 Stat. 75	Judge of the United States District Court for the Eastern District of Virginia; 1967–1985	Succeeded by James R. Spencer
Preceded by Richard Boykin Kellam	Chief Judge of the United States District Court for the Eastern District of Virginia; 1979–1985	Succeeded by Albert Vickers Bryan Jr.
