= United States District Court for the Eastern District of Virginia =

United States district court

- (E.D. Va.)
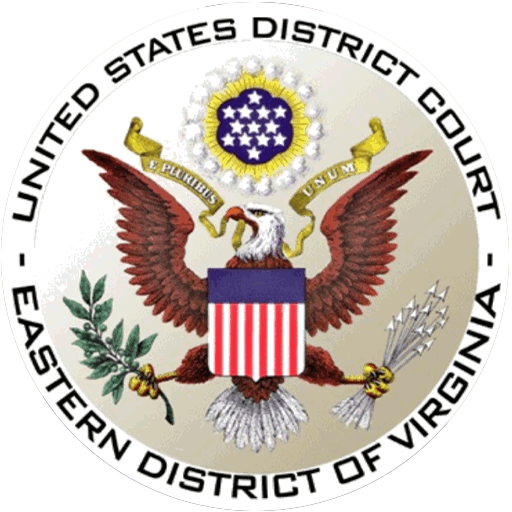
- Location: Albert V. Bryan U.S. Courthouse (Alexandria) More locations: Walter E. Hoffman U.S. Courthouse (Norfolk); Richmond; Newport News
- Appeals to: Fourth Circuit
- Established: September 24, 1789
- Judges: 11
- Chief Judge: M. Hannah Lauck

Officers of the court
- U.S. Attorney: Theo Stamos (acting)
- U.S. Marshal: Nick Edward Proffitt
- www.vaed.uscourts.gov

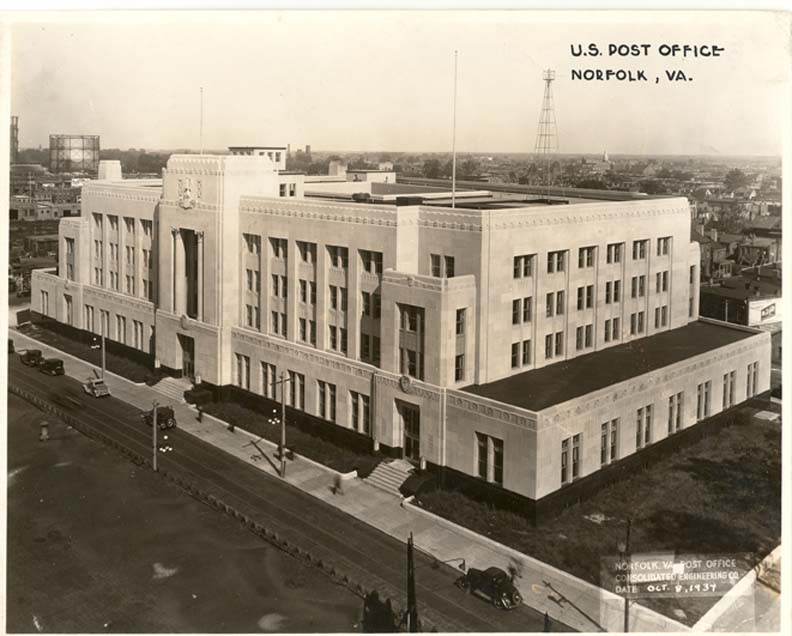
The Norfolk courthouse for the United States District Court, Eastern District of Virginia

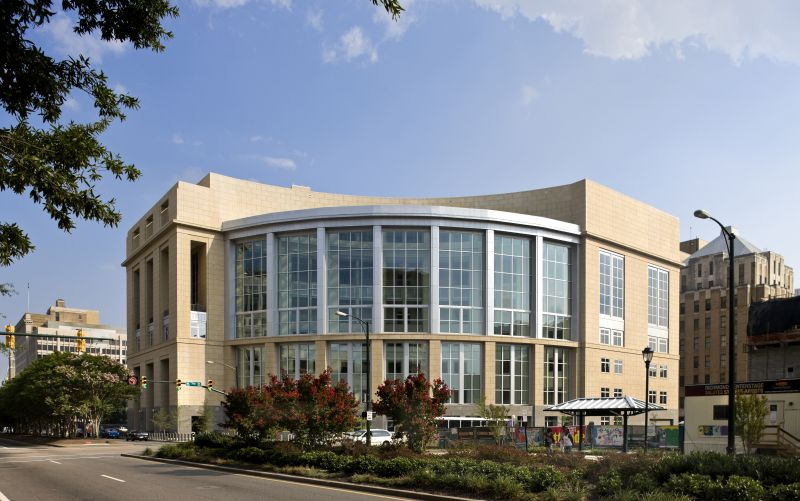
The Richmond courthouse for the United States District Court, Eastern District of Virginia

The United States District Court for the Eastern District of Virginia (EDVA; in case citations, E.D. Va.) is one of two United States district courts serving the Commonwealth of Virginia. Its jurisdiction includes over 85 percent of the state's population, including the metropolitan areas of Northern Virginia, Hampton Roads, and Richmond. Courthouses are located in Alexandria, Norfolk, Richmond, and Newport News.

Known widely as "the rocket docket", the Eastern District of Virginia has been the fastest federal trial court in the country for over 50 years. Adhering to the maxim "justice delayed is justice denied", the court aims to complete cases within one year, regardless of complexity. It schedules trials on weekends and holidays and maintains a virtual ban on continuance. The court utilizes a unique "master docket" to expedite cases: rather than assign individual caseloads, when a motion is up for consideration or a trial is scheduled to start, the matter will be handled by whichever judge is available. Judges are assigned only for patent cases and in rare exceptions.

With a jurisdiction which includes the Pentagon, much of the Intelligence Community, and Naval Station Norfolk, the world's largest naval base, the EDVA is a fixture in U.S. national security law, handling a large portion of the nation's espionage and terrorism cases. More than 1 in 5 terrorism charges filed in the United States since 1995 were filed in the EDVA. One of the district's senior judges also presides over the U.S. Foreign Intelligence Surveillance Court.

The U.S. Attorney for the Eastern District of Virginia wields one of the largest federal prosecutor offices in the country, staffed by over 300 attorneys and support staff.

Appeals from the Eastern District of Virginia are taken to the United States Court of Appeals for the Fourth Circuit, except for patent claims and claims against the U.S. government under the Tucker Act, which are appealed to the Federal Circuit.

== History ==
The United States District Court for the District of Virginia was one of the original 13 courts established by the Judiciary Act of 1789, 1 Stat. 73, on September 24, 1789.

On February 13, 1801, the Judiciary Act of 1801, 2 Stat. 89, divided Virginia into three judicial districts: the District of Virginia, which included the counties west of the Tidewater and south of the Rappahannock River; the District of Norfolk, which included the Tidewater counties south of the Rappahannock; and the District of Potomac, which included the counties north and east of the Rappahannock as well as Maryland counties along the Potomac. Just over a year later, on March 8, 1802, the Judiciary Act of 1801 was repealed and Virginia became a single district again, 2 Stat. 132, effective July 1, 1802.

The District of Virginia was subdivided into Eastern and Western Districts on February 4, 1819, by 3 Stat. 478. At that time, West Virginia was still part of Virginia, and was encompassed in Virginia's Western District, while the Eastern District essentially covered what is now the entire state of Virginia. With the division of West Virginia from Virginia during the American Civil War, the Western District of Virginia became the District of West Virginia, and those parts of the Western District that were not part of West Virginia were combined with the Eastern District to again form a single District of Virginia on June 11, 1864, by 13 Stat. 124. Congress again divided Virginia into the Eastern and Western Districts on February 3, 1871, by 16 Stat. 403.

Courts at Richmond are located in the Spottswood W. Robinson III and Robert R. Merhige Jr. Federal Courthouse, having previously been held in the historic Lewis F. Powell Jr. United States Courthouse.

During the second presidency of Donald Trump, the U.S. Attorney for the Eastern District of Virginia had been held by Erik Siebert, initially on an interim basis, before being appointed in May 2025. However, he resigned in September when he refused to prosecute former FBI director James Comey and Attorney General of New York Letitia James, two people who previously led legal cases against Trump. The position was briefly held by Maggie Cleary, before Lindsey Halligan was appointed, despite having no prosecutorial experience. She was disqualified on November 24, 2025 after being deemed to have been unlawfully appointed. Halligan left the Department of Justice in January 2026, and Frank Bradsher, an executive assistant U.S. attorney was elevated to the position instead. On February 20, 2026, the judges of the Eastern District of Virginia unanimously appointed James Hundley, but he was fired just hours later by Deputy Attorney General Todd Blanche. Bradsher continued to serve in the role until his 120 days were up, until Theo Stamos succeeded him in July.

=== The rocket docket ===
The Eastern District of Virginia is the originator of the term "rocket docket", which has since been applied to various other courts at times. The culture of speed was embedded in the EDVA by two judges who served on the court in the 1960's: Albert V. Bryan Jr., who often ruled on cases on the spot after motions were argued, and Walter E. Hoffman, who was known for scheduling trials for weekends, holidays and reportedly once on Christmas Day. Current chief judge Mark S. Davis has said that the current bench is driven in part by a shared belief in the maxim that "justice delayed is justice denied", but that the "expectations of the [EDVA] bar" nevertheless ensure that the court continues to maintain its famed pace.

== Jurisdiction ==
Map of the United States District Courts in Virginia, showing the boundaries of the Eastern and Western Districts, and their divisions.

The Eastern District of Virginia court's jurisdiction covers slightly over six million people, comprising approximately 85% of the state's population. Its jurisdiction is grouped into four geographic divisions:

=== Alexandria Division ===
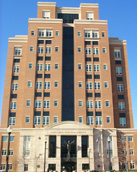
View of the US District Court for the Eastern District of Virginia at Alexandria, Virginia.

The Alexandria Division covers the counties of suburban Washington, D.C.: Arlington, Fairfax, Fauquier, Loudoun, Prince William, and Stafford, and includes the independent cities of Alexandria, Fairfax, Manassas, Manassas Park, and Falls Church.

=== Richmond Division ===
The Richmond Division comprises the counties of Amelia, Brunswick, Caroline, Charles City, Chesterfield, Dinwiddie, Essex, Goochland, Greensville, Hanover, Henrico, James City, King and Queen, King George, King William, Lancaster, Lunenburg, Mecklenburg, Middlesex, New Kent, Northumberland, Nottoway, Powhatan, Prince Edward, Prince George, Richmond, Spotsylvania, Surry, Sussex, and Westmoreland, as well as independent cities such as Colonial Heights and Fredericksburg.

=== Norfolk Division ===
Norfolk Division includes the counties of Accomack, Northampton, Isle of Wight, Southampton, and independent cities such as Chesapeake, Norfolk, Portsmouth, Suffolk, and Virginia Beach.

=== Newport News Division ===
The Newport News Division includes the counties of Gloucester, Mathews, York County, James City and cities such as Hampton, Newport News, Poquoson, and Williamsburg.

== United States Attorney ==
The U.S. attorney for the Eastern District of Virginia serves as prosecution for criminal cases brought by the federal government, and representing the United States in civil cases in the court. The U.S. Attorney's office also manages the Project Safe Neighborhoods program within the district to reduce gun violence, and is involved with federal initiatives on drug trafficking, terrorism, cybercrime, and the prevention of elder care abuse.

== Current judges ==
As of May 13, 2026:

#	Title	Judge	Duty station	Born	Term of service			Appointed by
#	Title	Judge	Duty station	Born	Active	Chief	Senior	Appointed by
44	Chief Judge	M. Hannah Lauck	Richmond	1963	2014–present	2025–present	—	Obama
33	District Judge	Leonie Brinkema	Alexandria	1944	1993–present	—	—	Clinton
40	District Judge	Mark Steven Davis	Norfolk; Newport News	1962	2008–present	2018–2025	—	G.W. Bush
45	District Judge	Rossie D. Alston Jr.	Alexandria	1957	2019–present	—	—	Trump
46	District Judge	David J. Novak	Richmond	1961	2019–present	—	—	Trump
47	District Judge	Roderick C. Young	Richmond	1966	2020–present	—	—	Trump
48	District Judge	Patricia Tolliver Giles	Alexandria	1973	2021–present	—	—	Biden
49	District Judge	Michael S. Nachmanoff	Alexandria	1968	2021–present	—	—	Biden
50	District Judge	Elizabeth Hanes	Norfolk; Newport News	1978	2022–present	—	—	Biden
51	District Judge	Jamar K. Walker	Norfolk; Newport News	1986	2023–present	—	—	Biden
52	District Judge	vacant	—	—	—	—	—	—
27	Senior Judge	Claude M. Hilton	inactive	1940	1985–2005	1997–2004	2005–present	Reagan
30	Senior Judge	Rebecca Beach Smith	Norfolk; Newport News	1949	1989–2019	2011–2018	2019–present	G.H.W. Bush
32	Senior Judge	Robert E. Payne	Richmond	1941	1992–2007	—	2007–present	G.H.W. Bush
34	Senior Judge	Raymond Alvin Jackson	Norfolk; Newport News	1949	1993–2021	—	2021–present	Clinton
37	Senior Judge	Henry E. Hudson	Richmond	1947	2002–2018	—	2018–present	G.W. Bush
41	Senior Judge	Anthony Trenga	Alexandria	1949	2008–2021	—	2021–present	G.W. Bush
42	Senior Judge	John A. Gibney Jr.	Richmond	1951	2010–2021	—	2021–present	Obama
43	Senior Judge	Arenda Wright Allen	Norfolk; Newport News	1960	2011–2026	—	2026–present	Obama

== Vacancies and pending nominations ==
Seat	Prior Judge's Duty Station	Seat last held by	Vacancy reason	Date of vacancy	Nominee	Date of nomination
4	Norfolk; Newport News	Arenda Wright Allen	Senior status	May 13, 2026	–	–

== Former judges ==
#	Judge	Born–died	Active service	Chief Judge	Senior status	Appointed by	Reason for termination
1	St. George Tucker	1752–1827	1813–1825 (Note: Initially appointed to the United States District Court for the District of Virginia, reassigned by operation of law to the Eastern District of Virginia on February 4, 1819.)	—	—	Madison	resignation
2	George Hay	1765–1830	1825–1830 (Note: Recess appointment; formally nominated on December 13, 1825, confirmed by the United States Senate on March 31, 1826, and received commission the same day.)	—	—	J.Q. Adams	death
3	Philip P. Barbour	1783–1841	1830–1836 (Note: Recess appointment; formally nominated on December 14, 1830, confirmed by the Senate on December 16, 1830, and received commission the same day.)	—	—	Jackson	elevation
4	Peter Vivian Daniel	1784–1860	1836–1841	—	—	Jackson	elevation
5	John Y. Mason	1799–1859	1841–1844	—	—	Van Buren	resignation
6	James Halyburton	1803–1879	1844–1861	—	—	Tyler	resignation
7	John Curtiss Underwood	1809–1873	1863–1864 (Note: Recess appointment; formally nominated on January 5, 1864, confirmed by the Senate on January 25, 1864, and received commission the same day.); 1871–1873 (Note: Reassigned from the United States District Court for the District of Virginia on June 11, 1864.)	—	—	Lincoln; Operation of law	reassignment death
8	Robert William Hughes	1821–1901	1874–1898	—	—	Grant	retirement
9	Edmund Waddill Jr.	1855–1931	1898–1921	—	—	McKinley	elevation
10	Duncan Lawrence Groner	1873–1957	1921–1931	—	—	Harding	elevation
11	Luther B. Way	1879–1943	1931–1943	—	—	Hoover	death
12	Robert Nelson Pollard	1880–1954	1936–1947	—	1947–1954	F. Roosevelt	death
13	Charles Hutcheson	1894–1969	1944–1959	1948–1959	1959–1969	F. Roosevelt	death
14	Albert Vickers Bryan	1899–1984	1947–1961	1959–1961	—	Truman	elevation
15	Walter Edward Hoffman	1907–1996	1954–1974	1961–1973	1974–1996	Eisenhower	death
16	Oren Ritter Lewis	1902–1983	1960–1974	—	1974–1983	Eisenhower	death
17	John D. Butzner Jr.	1917–2006	1962–1967	—	—	Kennedy	elevation
18	Richard Boykin Kellam	1909–1996	1967–1981	1973–1979	1981–1996	L. Johnson	death
19	John Ashton MacKenzie	1917–2010	1967–1985	1979–1985	1985–1998	L. Johnson	retirement
20	Robert R. Merhige Jr.	1919–2005	1967–1986	—	1986–1998	L. Johnson	retirement
21	Albert Vickers Bryan Jr.	1926–2019	1971–1991	1985–1991	1991–2019	Nixon	death
22	David Dortch Warriner	1929–1986	1974–1986	—	—	Nixon	death
23	Joseph Calvitt Clarke Jr.	1920–2004	1974–1991	—	1991–2004	Ford	death
24	Richard Leroy Williams	1923–2011	1980–1992	—	1992–2011	Carter	death
25	James C. Cacheris	1933–2025	1981–1998	1991–1997	1998–2018	Reagan	retirement
26	Robert G. Doumar	1930–2023	1981–1996	—	1996–2023	Reagan	death
28	James R. Spencer	1949–present	1986–2014	2004–2011	2014–2017	Reagan	retirement
29	T. S. Ellis III	1940–2025	1987–2007	—	2007–2025	Reagan	death
31	Henry Coke Morgan Jr.	1935–2022	1992–2004	—	2004–2022	G.H.W. Bush	death
35	Jerome B. Friedman	1943–present	1997–2010	—	2010–2011	Clinton	retirement
36	Gerald Bruce Lee	1952–present	1998–2017	—	—	Clinton	retirement
38	Walter D. Kelley Jr.	1955–present	2004–2008	—	—	G.W. Bush	resignation
39	Liam O'Grady	1950–present	2007–2020	—	2020–2023	G.W. Bush	retirement

== Chief judges ==
Chief judges have administrative responsibilities with respect to their district court. Unlike the Supreme Court, where one justice is specifically nominated to be chief, the office of chief judge rotates among the district court judges. To be chief, a judge must have been in active service on the court for at least one year, be under the age of 65, and have not previously served as chief judge.

A vacancy is filled by the judge highest in seniority among the group of qualified judges. The chief judge serves for a term of seven years, or until age 70, whichever occurs first. The age restrictions are waived if no members of the court would otherwise be qualified for the position.

When the office was created in 1948, the chief judge was the longest-serving judge who had not elected to retire, on what has since 1958 been known as senior status, or declined to serve as chief judge. After August 6, 1959, judges could not become or remain chief after turning 70 years old. The current rules have been in operation since October 1, 1982.

== Succession of seats ==
Seat 1
Seat reassigned from the District of Virginia on February 4, 1819 by 3 Stat. 478
Tucker	1819–1825
Hay	1825–1830
Barbour	1830–1836
Daniel	1836–1841
Mason	1841–1844
Halyburton	1844–1861
Underwood	1863–1864
Seat reassigned to the District of Virginia on June 11, 1864 by 13 Stat. 124
Seat reassigned from the District of Virginia on February 3, 1871 by 16 Stat. 403
Underwood	1871–1873
Hughes	1874–1898
Waddill Jr.	1898–1921
Groner	1921–1931
Way	1931–1943
Hutcheson	1944–1959
Lewis	1960–1974
Warriner	1974–1986
Smith	1989–2019
Young	2020–present

Seat 2
Seat established on August 2, 1935 by 49 Stat. 508
Pollard	1936–1947
Bryan	1947–1961
Butzner Jr.	1962–1967
Merhige Jr.	1967–1986
Ellis III	1987–2007
Davis	2008–present

Seat 3
Seat established on February 10, 1954 by 68 Stat. 8
Hoffman	1954–1974
Clarke Jr.	1974–1991
Payne	1992–2007
Gibney Jr.	2010–2021
Hanes	2022–present

Seat 4
Seat established on March 18, 1966 by 80 Stat. 75
Kellam	1967–1981
Doumar	1981–1996
Friedman	1997–2010
Allen	2011–2026
vacant	2026–present

Seat 5
Seat established on March 18, 1966 by 80 Stat. 75
MacKenzie	1967–1985
Spencer	1986–2014
Lauck	2014–present

Seat 6
Seat established on June 2, 1970 by 84 Stat. 294
Bryan Jr.	1971–1991
Brinkema	1993–present

Seat 7
Seat established on October 20, 1978 by 92 Stat. 1629
Williams	1980–1992
Jackson	1993–2021
Walker	2023–present

Seat 8
Seat established on October 20, 1978 by 92 Stat. 1629
Cacheris	1981–1998
Lee	1998–2017
Alston Jr.	2019–present

Seat 9
Seat established on July 10, 1984 by 98 Stat. 333
Hilton	1985–2005
O'Grady	2007–2020
Giles	2021–present

Seat 10
Seat established on December 1, 1990 by 104 Stat. 5089 (temporary)
Seat made permanent on November 2, 2002 by 116 Stat. 1758
Morgan Jr.	1992–2004
Kelley Jr.	2004–2008
Trenga	2008–2021
Nachmanoff	2021–present

Seat 11
Seat established on December 21, 2000 by 114 Stat. 2762
Hudson	2002–2018
Novak	2019–present

== Notable cases ==
The Eastern District of Virginia has handled many notable cases, including:

- West v. Bliley, striking down Virginia's white primary, 33 F.2d 177 (E.D. Va., 1929)
- United States v. Zacarias Moussaoui, No. 01-455-A (E.D. Va.)
- United States v. Ahmed Omar Abu Ali
- United States v. John Walker Lindh, No. 02-37-A (E.D. Va.)
- Yaser Hamdi v. Donald Rumsfeld, No. 02-439 (E.D. Va.)
- United States v. Michael Vick, No. 3:07CR274 (E.D. Va) (the Bad Newz Kennels dogfighting case)
- eBay Inc. v. MercExchange, L.L.C., 271 F. Supp. 2d 789 (E.D. Va. 2002) (in which the court took the position, eventually upheld by the U.S. Supreme Court, that a prevailing plaintiff in a patent suit is not necessarily entitled to injunctive relief)
- Extradition of Kevin Dahlgren, charged with committing mass murder in Brno, Czech Republic in 2013
- Bostic v. Rainey
- Matter of Baby K, controversial ruling to provide life-sustaining care to an anencephalic newborn.
- United States v. Paul J. Manafort Jr.
- Chelsea Manning's contempt of court case
- United States v Daniel Hale
- United States v Javaid Perwaiz
- United States v. Randall Todd Royer, Ibrahim Ahmed Al-Hamdi, Masoud Ahmad Khan, Yong Ki Kwon, Mohammed Aatique, Seifullah Chapman, Donald Thomas Surratt, Caliph Basha Ibn Abdur-Raheem, Khwaja Mahmood Hasan, and Sabri Benkhala (E.D. Va., 2004)
- Cable News Network L.P. v. CNNews.com, 162 F.Supp.2d 484 (E.D. Va., 2001)
- Petition of Nemetz

== United States attorneys ==
List of US attorneys since 1831:

- Thomas E. Burfoot (1831–1833)
- Robert C. Nicholas (1833–1850)
- William T. Joynes (1850–1853)
- John Munford Gregory (1853–1860)
- Patrick H. Aylett (1860–1861)
- A. Judson Crane (1861–1863)
- Lucius H. Chandler (1863–1870)
- Henry H. Wells (1870–1874)
- Lunsford L. Lewis (1874–1882)
- John Sergeant Wise (1882–1883)
- Edmund Waddill Jr. (1883–1885)
- John C. Gibson (1885–1889)
- Thomas R. Borland (1889–1893)
- Francis R. Lassiter (1893–1896)
- William H. White (1896–1898)
- Edgar Allan (1898–1902)
- Lunsford L. Lewis (1902–1905)
- Robert H. Talley (1905)
- Lunsford L. Lewis (1905–1912)
- Duncan Lawrence Groner (1912–1914)
- Richard H. Mann (1914–1919)
- Hiram M. Smith (1914–1920)
- Duncan Lawrence Groner (1920)
- Julien Gunn (1920–1921)
- Duncan Lawrence Groner (1921)
- Paul W. Kear (1921–1931)
- Robert H. Talley (1931–1932)
- Paul W. Kear (1932–1933)
- Charles Sterling Hutcheson (1933–1944)
- Henry Holt (1944–1947)
- George R. Humrickhouse (1947–1951)
- A. Carter Whitehead (1951–1953)
- Lester S. Parsons Jr. (1953–1957)
- John M. Hollis (1957–1959)
- Joseph S. Bambacus (1959–1961)
- Claude V. Spratley Jr. (1961–1969)
- Brian P. Gettings (1969–1974)
- David H. Hopkins (1974–1975)
- William B. Cummings (1975–1979)
- Justin W. Williams (1979–1981)
- Elsie L. Munsell (1981–1986)
- Justin W. Williams (1986)
- Henry E. Hudson (1986–1991)
- Kenneth E. Melson (1991)
- Richard Cullen (1991–1993)
- Kenneth E. Melson (1993)
- Helen F. Fahey (1993–2001)
- Kenneth E. Melson (2001)
- Paul McNulty (2001–2006)
- Chuck Rosenberg (2006–2008)
- Dana Boente (2008–2009)
- Neil MacBride (2009–2013)
- Dana Boente (2013–2018)
- Tracy Doherty-McCormick (2018)
- G. Zachary Terwilliger (2018–2021)
- Raj Parekh (2021)
- Jessica Aber (2021–2025)
- Erik Siebert (2025)
- Maggie Cleary (2025)
- Lindsey Halligan (2025–2026)
- Frank Bradsher (2026)
- James Hundley (2026)
- Theo Stamos (2026–present)

== See also ==
- Albert V. Bryan United States Courthouse
- Alexandria City Jail
- Courts of Virginia
- List of current United States district judges
- List of United States federal courthouses in Virginia
- United States Attorney for the District of Virginia
