= Phillip Kellam =

American politician (born 1956)

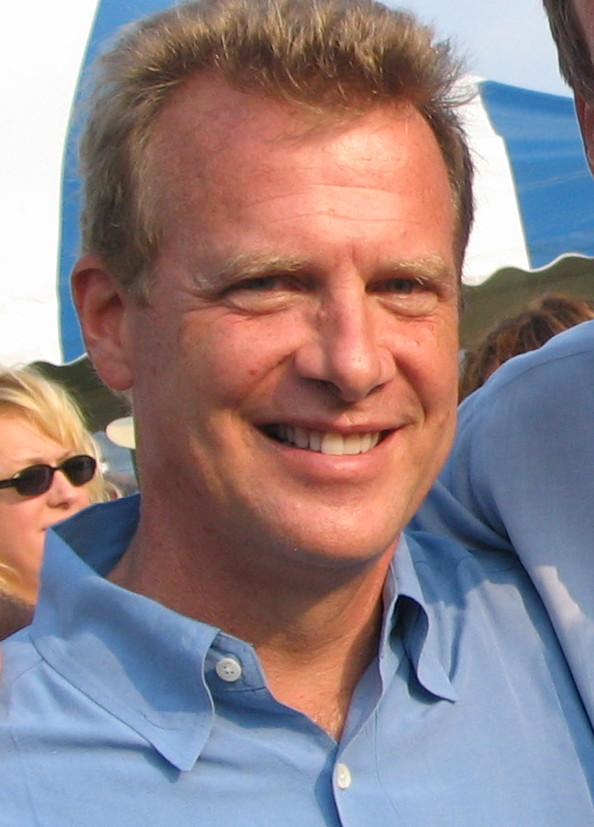
- Kellam in 2006

Commissioner of the Revenue for Virginia Beach
- Incumbent
- Assumed office 1998

Personal details
- Born: 1956 (age 69–70)
- Party: Democratic Party
- Education: Elon College

Phillip Kellam (born 1956) is a politician from a well known political family in Virginia Beach. A member of the Democratic Party, he has served as the Commissioner of the Revenue for Virginia Beach since 1998. He ran for Congress in Virginia's 2nd congressional district in 2006.

== Family life ==
Kellam is a graduate of Elon College. He has two sons.

Kellam comes from a well known political family in Southeast Virginia. His grandfather, Abel Kellam, served as clerk of the Princess Anne Circuit Court for 20 years. The Chesapeake Bay Bridge-Tunnel is officially named the Lucius J. Kellam Jr. Bridge-Tunnel, named after a great-uncle. Floyd E. Kellam High School is named after an uncle who was a circuit court judge. Another uncle, Sidney Kellam, was the county's political leader for 40 years and engineered the merger of Virginia Beach and Princess Anne County. His father, Richard B. Kellam, was a federal judge for 29 years, after serving seven years on the Circuit Court in Virginia Beach.

== Virginia Beach Commissioner of the Revenue ==
Kellam was first elected Virginia Beach's Commissioner of the Revenue in 1997. He was re-elected in 2001, 2005, 2009, 2013, 2017, 2021, and 2025.

== 2006 congressional campaign ==
In 2005 Kellam filed to challenge incumbent Republican Rep. Thelma Drake for the Virginia's 2nd congressional district. A poll conducted on September 6 showed Kellam leading Rep. Drake by 8 points, 51–43, with 6% undecided. However, Kellam lost to Drake by a 3 percent margin.
