= Elizabeth Hanes =

American judge (born 1978)

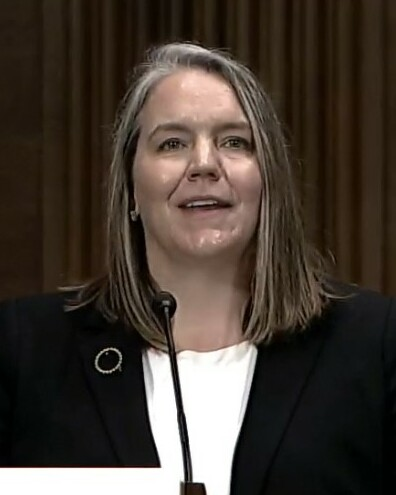

Judge of the United States District Court for the Eastern District of Virginia
- Incumbent
- Assumed office August 5, 2022
- Appointed by: Joe Biden
- Preceded by: John A. Gibney Jr.

Magistrate Judge of the United States District Court for the Eastern District of Virginia
- In office June 15, 2020 – August 5, 2022

Personal details
- Born: Elizabeth Slater Wilson; 1978 (age 47–48) Roanoke, Virginia, U.S.
- Education: University of Richmond (BA, JD)

Elizabeth Wilson Hanes (née Elizabeth Slater Wilson, born 1978) is an American lawyer from Virginia who serves as a United States district judge for the United States District Court for the Eastern District of Virginia. She previously served as a United States magistrate judge of the same court.

== Early life and education ==
Hanes was born in 1978 in Roanoke, Virginia. She received her Bachelor of Arts from the University of Richmond, cum laude, in 2000 and her Juris Doctor from the University of Richmond School of Law, summa cum laude, in 2007.

== Career ==
After completing law school, Hanes served as a law clerk for Judge Joseph R. Goodwin of the United States District Court for the Southern District of West Virginia from 2007 to 2008, and then as a law clerk for Judge Robert Bruce King of the United States Court of Appeals for the Fourth Circuit from 2008 to 2009. From 2009 to 2016, she was an assistant federal public defender in the Eastern District of Virginia. She then joined the firm Consumer Litigation Associates, P.C. in Newport News, Virginia, where she worked as a civil litigator from 2016 to 2020. Hanes served on the Criminal Justice Act Panel Committee for the Richmond Division of the United States District Court for the Eastern District of Virginia.

=== Federal judicial service ===
Hanes was sworn in as a magistrate judge for the Eastern District of Virginia on June 15, 2020. She sat with the court's Richmond division. On November 4, 2021, Senators Mark Warner and Tim Kaine recommended Hanes to fill a vacancy on the Eastern District of Virginia created by Judge John A. Gibney Jr., who assumed senior status on November 1, 2021. On April 27, 2022, President Joe Biden announced his intent to nominate Hanes to serve as a United States district judge of the United States District Court for the Eastern District of Virginia. On May 19, 2022, her nomination was sent to the Senate. A hearing on her nomination was held before the Senate Judiciary Committee on June 22, 2022. On July 21, 2022, her nomination was reported out of committee by a 15–7 vote. On August 1, 2022, the United States Senate invoked cloture on her nomination by a 56–33 vote. On August 2, 2022, her nomination was confirmed by a 59–37 vote. She received her judicial commission on August 5, 2022.

Legal offices
| Preceded by John A. Gibney Jr. | Judge of the United States District Court for the Eastern District of Virginia; 2022–present | Incumbent |
