= Glenn Yates Jr. =

American politician (1927–2022)

Member of the Virginia House of Delegates
- In office 1966–1972

Personal details
- Born: September 7, 1927
- Died: January 26, 2022 (aged 94)
- Occupation: architect

Military service
- Branch/service: United States Merchant Marines

Glennie Yates Jr. (September 7, 1927 – January 26, 2022) was an American politician and architect.

== Biography ==
Yates was born in Walnut Ridge, Arkansas. He moved with his family to Virginia Beach, Virginia, during World War II. He served in the United States Merchant Marines for two years. Yates then went to University of Virginia, University of Pennsylvania, and Pratt Institute. Yates served in the Virginia House of Delegates from 1966 until 1972. Yates lived in Portsmouth, Virginia, with his wife and family and was an architect.
