= Richard Boykin Kellam =

American judge

Senior Judge of the United States District Court for the Eastern District of Virginia
- In office May 30, 1981 – June 8, 1996

Chief Judge of the United States District Court for the Eastern District of Virginia
- In office 1973–1979
- Preceded by: Walter Edward Hoffman
- Succeeded by: John Ashton MacKenzie

Judge of the United States District Court for the Eastern District of Virginia
- In office August 25, 1967 – May 30, 1981
- Appointed by: Lyndon B. Johnson
- Preceded by: Seat established by 80 Stat. 75
- Succeeded by: Robert G. Doumar

Personal details
- Born: Richard Boykin Kellam; May 30, 1909 Princess Anne County, Virginia
- Died: June 8, 1996 (aged 87) Virginia Beach, Virginia
- Children: Richard Kellam, Phillip Kellam, Martha Kellam
- Education: read law

Richard Boykin Kellam (May 30, 1909 – June 8, 1996) was a United States district judge of the United States District Court for the Eastern District of Virginia.

== Education and career ==
Born in Princess Anne County, Virginia, Kellam read law to enter the bar in 1934. He was in private practice in Virginia from 1934 to 1960. He was a judge of the Circuit Court for the 28th Judicial Circuit of Virginia from 1960 to 1967.

== Federal judicial service ==
On July 17, 1967, Kellam was nominated by President Lyndon B. Johnson to a new seat on the United States District Court for the Eastern District of Virginia created by 80 Stat. 75. He was confirmed by the United States Senate on August 18, 1967, and received his commission on August 25, 1967. He served as Chief Judge from 1973 to 1979, and assumed senior status on May 30, 1981. Kellam served in that capacity until his death, on June 8, 1996, in Virginia Beach, Virginia. He was regarded by the local trial lawyers as the best prepared, most fair of the federal jurist in the Eastern District of Virginia.

== Family ==
Kellam was one of twelve sons, part of a well known political family in Southeast Virginia. His father, Abel Kellam, served as clerk of the Princess Anne Circuit Court for 20 years. The Chesapeake Bay Bridge-Tunnel, is officially named the Lucius J. Kellam Jr. Bridge-Tunnel, named after an uncle. Floyd E. Kellam High School is named after a brother who was a circuit court judge. Another brother, Sidney Kellam, was the county's political leader for 40 years and engineered the merger of Virginia Beach and Princess Anne County. Sidney was a lieutenant in the Byrd Machine and his run for Governor was thwarted over controversy with the IRS. His son, Phillip Kellam was Commissioner of the Revenue for Virginia Beach for 12 years and later ran unsuccessfully for Congress.

== Sources ==
Legal offices
Preceded by Seat established by 80 Stat. 75	Judge of the United States District Court for the Eastern District of Virginia; 1967–1981	Succeeded by Robert G. Doumar
Preceded by Walter Edward Hoffman	Chief Judge of the United States District Court for the Eastern District of Virginia; 1973–1979	Succeeded by John Ashton MacKenzie
