= Albert V. Bryan United States Courthouse =

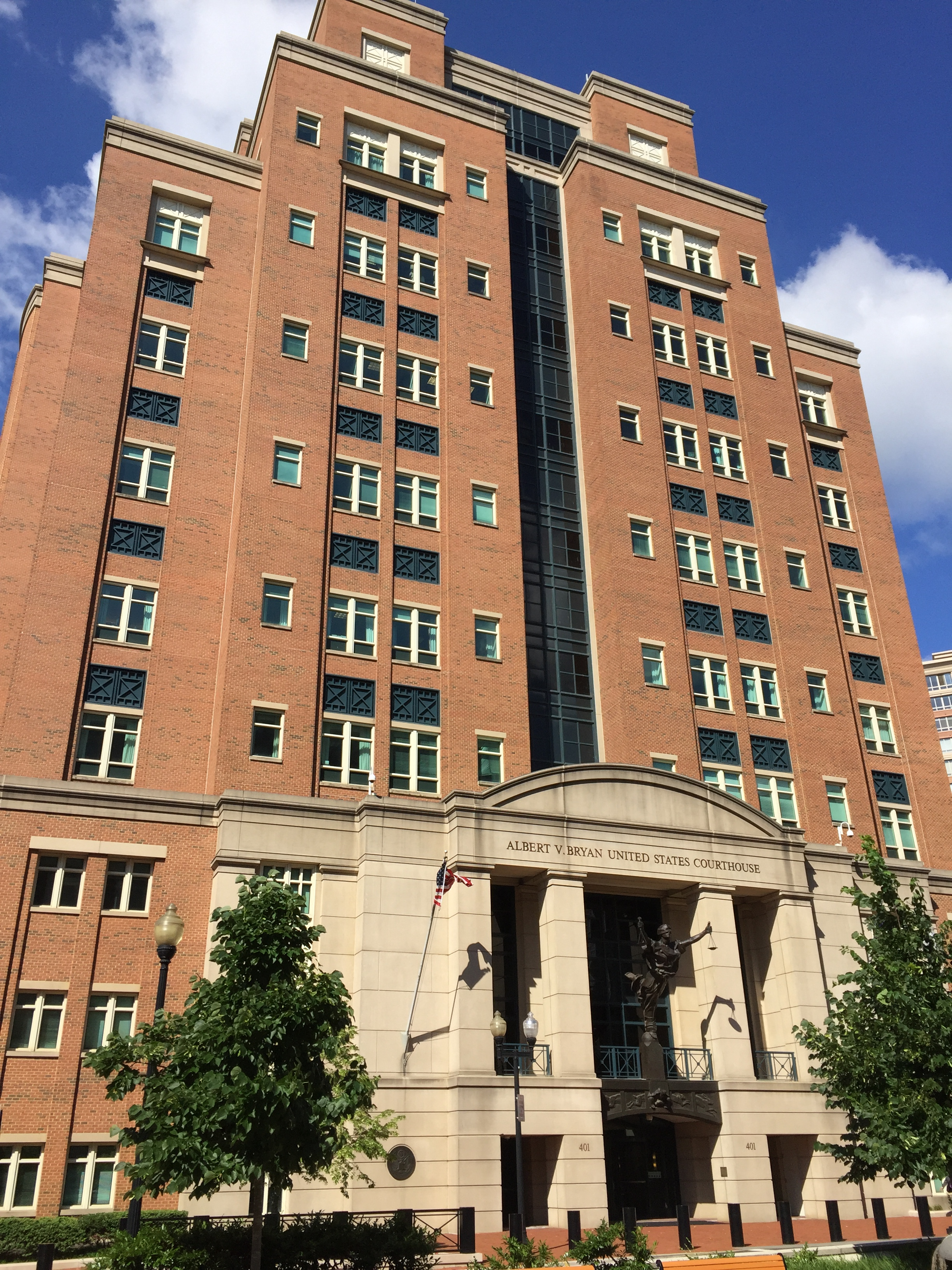
- Bryan Courthouse

- Location within Virginia Location within the United States

General information
- Type: Court House
- Location: 401 Courthouse Square; Alexandria, Virginia 22314, U.S.
- Coordinates: 38.80230°N 77.06617°W
- Construction started: 1992
- Completed: 1995

Height
- Roof: 117 ft.

Technical details
- Floor count: 10

The Albert V. Bryan United States Courthouse is a United States courthouse of the United States District Court for the Eastern District of Virginia. It is located at 401 Courthouse Square (2200 Jamieson Avenue) in Alexandria, Virginia, and was built in the early 1990s. It was named in honor of U.S. Court of Appeals judge Albert V. Bryan on June 26, 1995, through Congressional legislation sponsored by U.S. Senator John Warner of Virginia. From the mid-1980s until 1995, the name was applied to the 1932 federal courthouse at 200 South Washington Street that is now called the Martin V.B. Bostetter Courthouse.

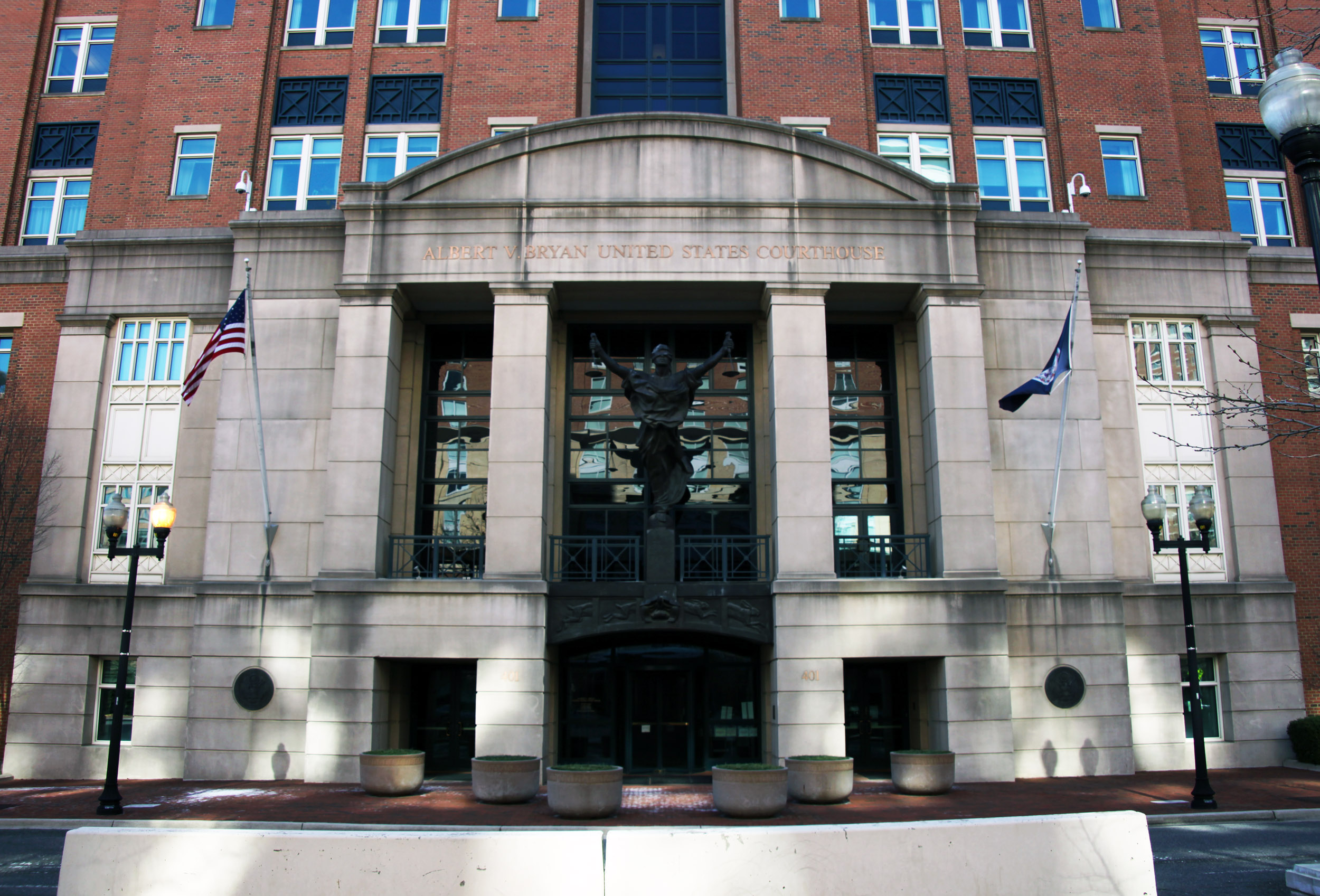
Entrance to the courthouse
