= Robert E. Payne =

American judge (born 1941)

Senior Judge of the United States District Court for the Eastern District of Virginia
- Incumbent
- Assumed office May 7, 2007

Judge of the United States District Court for the Eastern District of Virginia
- In office May 13, 1992 – May 7, 2007
- Appointed by: George H. W. Bush
- Preceded by: Joseph Calvitt Clarke Jr.
- Succeeded by: John A. Gibney Jr.

Personal details
- Born: May 7, 1941 (age 85) Mount Sterling, Kentucky, U.S.
- Education: Washington and Lee University (BA, JD)

Military service
- Branch/service: United States Army
- Unit: Judge Advocate General's Corps

Robert E. Payne (born 1941) is an American attorney and jurist serving as a senior United States district judge of the United States District Court for the Eastern District of Virginia.

== Early life and education ==
Born in Mount Sterling, Kentucky, Payne received a Bachelor of Arts degree from Washington and Lee University in 1963 and a Juris Doctor from Washington and Lee University School of Law in 1967.

== Career ==
While serving in the United States Army, Payne was a member of the Judge Advocate General's Corps from 1967 to 1971. He operated a private practice in Richmond, Virginia from 1971 to 1992.

=== Federal judicial service ===
On November 20, 1991, Payne was nominated by President George H. W. Bush to a seat on the United States District Court for the Eastern District of Virginia vacated by Joseph Calvitt Clarke Jr. Payne was confirmed by the United States Senate on May 12, 1992, and received his commission on May 13, 1992. He assumed senior status on May 7, 2007.

In June 2026, Payne blocked a Virginia law that prevented Immigration and Customs Enforcement officers from wearing masks to conceal their identities.

== Sources ==
Legal offices
Preceded by Joseph Calvitt Clarke Jr.	Judge of the United States District Court for the Eastern District of Virginia; 1992–2007	Succeeded by John A. Gibney Jr.
