= J. Spencer Bell =

American judge (1906–1967)

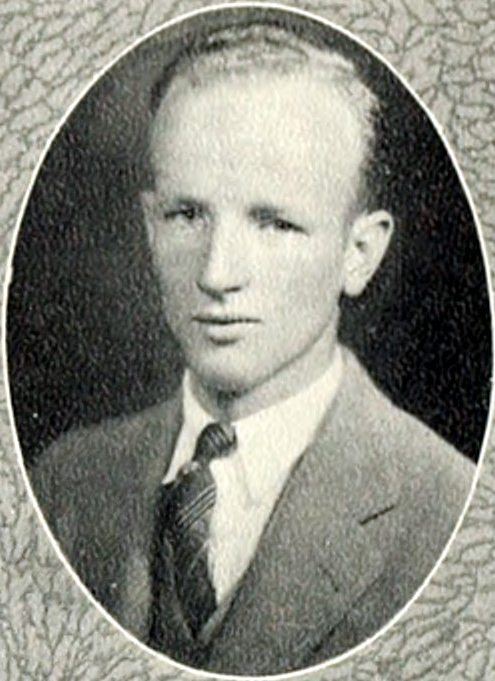
- 1927 Duke University Yearbook (age 21)

Judge of the United States Court of Appeals for the Fourth Circuit
- In office September 27, 1961 – March 19, 1967
- Appointed by: John F. Kennedy
- Preceded by: Seat established by 75 Stat. 80
- Succeeded by: John D. Butzner Jr.

Personal details
- Born: Jesse Spencer Bell; April 1, 1906 Charlotte, North Carolina
- Died: March 19, 1967 (aged 60)
- Education: Duke University (BA); University of North Carolina School of Law (LLB)
- Committees: Bell Commission (1950s)

Jesse Spencer Bell (April 1, 1906 – March 19, 1967) was a United States circuit judge of the United States Court of Appeals for the Fourth Circuit.

== Education and career ==
Born in Charlotte, North Carolina, Bell received a Bachelor of Arts degree from Duke University in 1927 and after studying at Harvard Law School received a Bachelor of Laws from the University of North Carolina School of Law in 1930. Bell was in private practice of law in Charlotte from 1930 to 1961. He served in the United States Army in field artillery, achieving the rank of major.

He was a member of the North Carolina Senate from 1957 to 1961. In the 1950s, he chaired the Committee on Improving and Expediting the Administration of Justice in North Carolina, also known as the Bell Commission. He was a delegate to the 1960 Democratic National Convention.

== Federal judicial service ==
Bell was nominated by President John F. Kennedy on September 14, 1961, to the United States Court of Appeals for the Fourth Circuit, to a new seat created by 75 Stat. 80. Bell was confirmed by the United States Senate on September 23, 1961, and received his commission on September 27, 1961. His service was terminated on March 19, 1967, due to his death.

== Sources ==
- Jesse Spencer Bell Papers J. Murrey Atkins Library, UNC Charlotte
- Jesse Spencer Bell Paper Atkins Library

Legal offices
Preceded by Seat established by 75 Stat. 80	Judge of the United States Court of Appeals for the Fourth Circuit; 1961–1967	Succeeded by John D. Butzner Jr.
