= Robert R. Merhige Jr. =

American judge

Robert Reynold Merhige Jr.

Senior Judge of the United States District Court for the Eastern District of Virginia
- In office November 30, 1986 – June 8, 1998

Judge of the United States District Court for the Eastern District of Virginia
- In office August 25, 1967 – November 30, 1986
- Appointed by: Lyndon B. Johnson
- Preceded by: John D. Butzner Jr.
- Succeeded by: T. S. Ellis III

Personal details
- Born: Robert Reynold Merhige Jr. February 5, 1919 New York City, New York
- Died: February 18, 2005 (aged 86) Richmond, Virginia
- Education: University of Richmond School of Law (LL.B.); University of Virginia School of Law (LL.M.)

Robert Reynold Merhige Jr. (February 5, 1919 – February 18, 2005) was a United States district judge of the United States District Court for the Eastern District of Virginia who was known for his rulings on desegregation in the 1970s.

== Early life and education ==
Born February 5, 1919, in New York City, New York, Merhige attended High Point College in North Carolina and received a Bachelor of Laws from the University of Richmond School of Law in 1942. He later received a Master of Laws from the University of Virginia School of Law in 1982.

== Military and early legal career ==
Merhige served in the United States Army Air Corps from 1942 to 1945, flying many missions in Boeing B-17 Flying Fortress bombers during World War II. He entered private practice in Richmond, Virginia from 1945 to 1967. He taught law at the Smithdeal-Massey School of Law from 1945 to 1948. He was vice president and general counsel for the Crass Coca-Cola Bottling Company from 1952 to 1955. He was a lecturer at the University of Virginia from 1968 to 1972. He was an adjunct professor at the University of Richmond School of Law from 1973 to 1976.

== Federal judicial service ==
Merhige was nominated by President Lyndon B. Johnson on July 17, 1967, to a seat on the United States District Court for the Eastern District of Virginia vacated by Judge John D. Butzner Jr. He was confirmed by the United States Senate on August 18, 1967, and received his commission on August 25, 1967. He was a member of the Judicial Conference of the United States from 1980 to 1985. He assumed senior status on November 30, 1986. He was a member of the Judicial Panel on Multidistrict Litigation from 1990 to 1998. His service terminated on June 8, 1998, due to his retirement.

=== Notable cases ===
Although the first stage of Massive Resistance to desegregation of Virginia's schools was over (which even included United States District Judge C. Sterling Hutcheson retiring from the bench rather than enforce Brown v. Board of Education), segregation remained. Early in his long judicial career, Merhige ordered dozens of Virginia's public school systems to desegregate, and for a time was considered the most hated man in Richmond—under 24-hour protection by the United States Marshals Service and with weekly protests at his home, his mother-in-law's cottage on his property was burned to the ground, and his dog tied up and shot dead. Black families moved into white urban neighborhoods in Richmond throughout the 1950s, 1960s, and by the 1970s white flight to suburbs in neighboring counties had left the Richmond city schools predominately black. In January 1972, Merhige ruled that students in Henrico and Chesterfield counties in Virginia would have to be bused to the Richmond city schools in order to decrease the high percentage of black students in Richmond's schools. Critics focused on Judge Merhige personally, including noting that his own children were enrolled in private school and thus unaffected by his order. One of Merhige's orders in that case was overturned by the Fourth Circuit Court of Appeals on June 6, 1972, barring most busing schemes that made students cross county/city boundaries, but not before influencing that year's presidential primary in Miami Beach, Florida. (Note: Since 1871, Virginia has had independent cities which are not politically located within counties, although some are completely surrounded geographically by a single county. This distinctive and unusual arrangement was pivotal in the Court of Appeals decision overturning Merhige's ruling). Merhige's courage and strength of character, as well as his preparation, courtesy, dedication to the rule of law and respect for the litigants before him ultimately turned that hatred into deep respect.

In 1970 Judge Merhige ordered the University of Virginia to admit women. He also clarified the rights of pregnant women to keep their jobs, and with United States Bankruptcy Judge Blackwell Shelley handled the complex products liability litigation and bankruptcy reorganization of the A. H. Robins Company concerning the Dalkon Shield. Moreover, by 1988, some noticed that Merhige was one of the federal judges with the lowest percentage (5%) of being overruled by appellate panels.

In 1968 Merhige ruled that the conflict in Vietnam was a war, whether or not it was a declared war, and denied the request of 96 Army reservists to avoid that combat. Judge Merhige also presided over the complex litigation concerning Allied Chemical's discharges of kepone and other chemicals into the James River, approving the creation of an environmental trust fund.

Merhige authored the ruling of the three federal judge panel that rejected the appeals of Watergate criminals G. Gordon Liddy, Bernard Barker, and Eugenio Martinez and upheld their criminal convictions for breaking into the office of Daniel Ellsberg's psychiatrist.

Merhige presided over the Greensboro massacre trials of members of the Ku Klux Klan and American Nazi Party for killing Communist Workers Party members in 1979.

== Retirement, death and legacy ==
Merhige retired from the federal bench on June 8, 1998, and joined the law firm of Hunton & Williams in Richmond with a practice focusing on mediation. Merhige died on February 18, 2005, at Virginia Commonwealth University Medical College of Virginia in Richmond after undergoing open heart surgery.

One recollection has him faithfully at a dry cleaners every Friday at the opening time of 8:00 am. Though the attendant was always late, he persisted, saying that, "Unbelievable, the control this woman has over a federal judge!".

In 2008, the new federal courthouse in Richmond (to which the district and bankruptcy courts and probation office moved) was named to honor Merhige and Spottswood Robinson III, who fought many desegregation battles in Virginia before also becoming a distinguished federal judge. In 1993, the building where they had practiced as lawyers and judges was renamed the Lewis F. Powell Jr. United States Courthouse, after their longtime friend and colleague. The United States Court of Appeals for the Fourth Circuit continues to use that National Historic Landmark building. The Center for Environmental Studies at the University of Richmond School of Law is named in his honor, as is the moot court room. The William Taylor Muse Law Library at the University of Richmond holds his papers in its special collections.

Merhige's life and career has been covered in a 2022 documentary entitled The Judge – Character. Cases. Courage. Directed by Robert Griffith and narrated by Justin Theroux, the film was released as a project of the American Documentary Film Fund.

== Sources ==
- FJC Bio
- Ronald J. Bacigal, May it please the court: a biography of Judge Robert R. Merhige Jr. (University Press of America, 1992)
- Baliles, Gerald L. (April 2005). "Reflections: The Honorable Robert R. Merhige Jr" (PDF). Virginia Lawyer. 53 (9): 26–27.

Legal offices
Preceded by John D. Butzner Jr.	Judge of the United States District Court for the Eastern District of Virginia; 1967–1986	Succeeded by T. S. Ellis III
