= Martin V. B. Bostetter =

American judge (1926–2014)

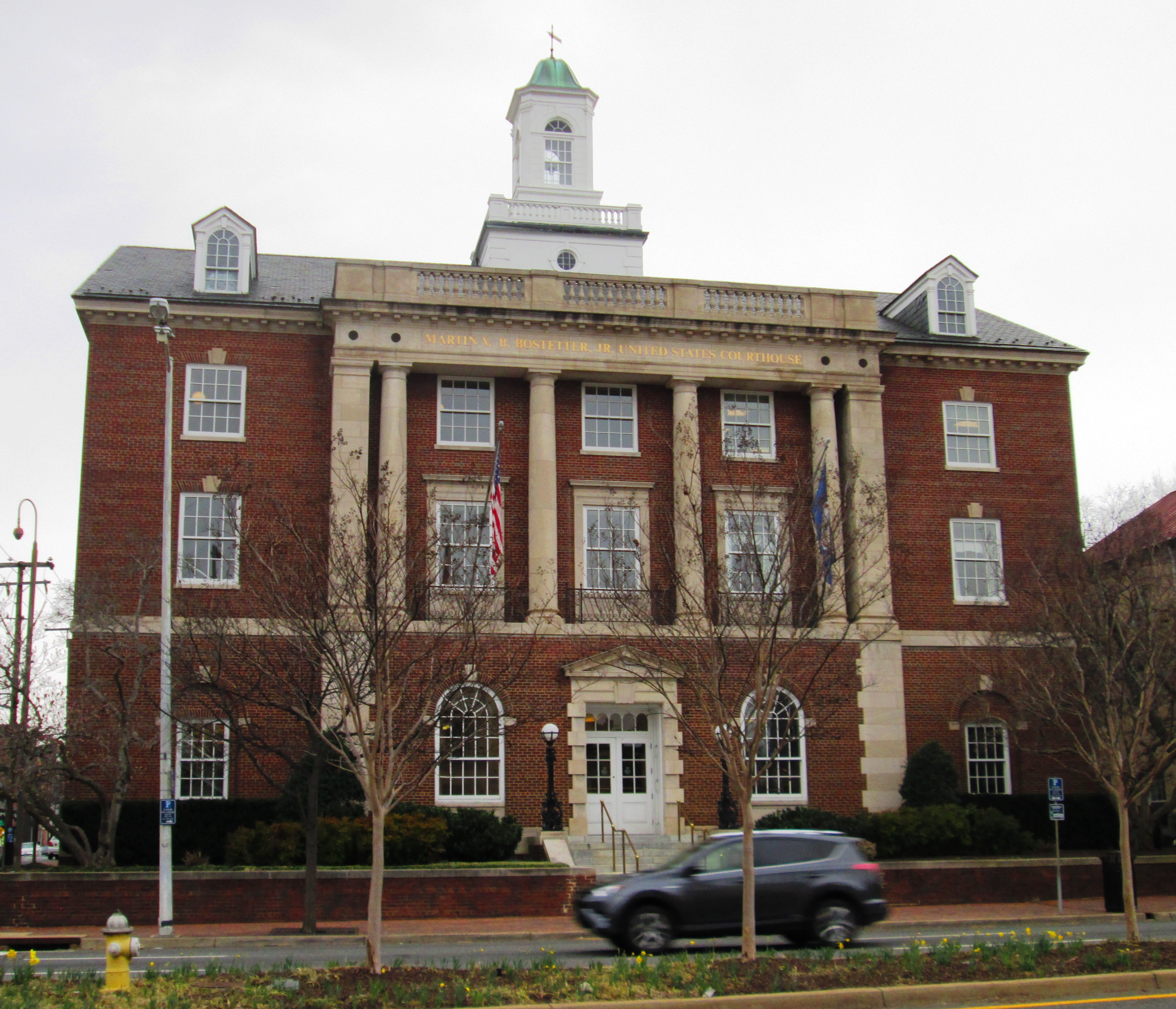
The Martin V. B. Bostetter, Jr. United States Courthouse at 200 S. Washington Street in the Old Town of Alexandria, Virginia. The building is a contributing property to the Alexandria Historic District, a National Historic Landmark.

Martin V. B. Bostetter Jr. (March 11, 1926 – August 8, 2014) was the Chief Judge of United States Bankruptcy Court for the Eastern District of Virginia and among the longest sitting full-time bankruptcy judges in the United States.

Bostetter was born in Baltimore, Maryland. During World War II, he served in the United States Navy. He attended the University of Virginia, following his tour of duty, where he obtained his B.A. degree in 1950, and his Latin Bachelor of Laws degree in 1952.

Since 1952, Bostetter's entire career took place within a radius of eight blocks in Old Town, Alexandria, Virginia. He began practicing law in Alexandria in 1952, and was appointed Special Assistant to the City Attorney in 1953, serving in the capacity of Prosecutor. He resigned this post in 1957, to become Associate Judge of the Municipal Court of the City of Alexandria. He served in this position for a two-year period, resigning in 1959, to accept an appointment to the United States Bankruptcy Court.

Bostetter continued to serve as a judge for the United States Bankruptcy Court for the Eastern District of Virginia until his retirement. He was appointed Chief Judge on February 1, 1985.
