= Albert Vickers Bryan =

American judge (1899–1984)

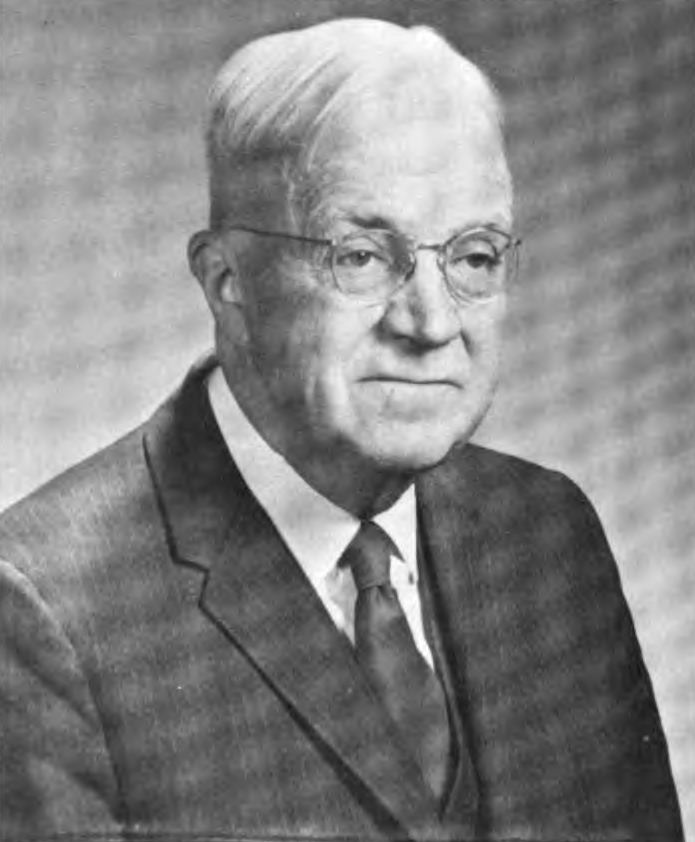

Senior Judge of the United States Court of Appeals for the Fourth Circuit
- In office May 3, 1972 – March 13, 1984

Judge of the United States Court of Appeals for the Fourth Circuit
- In office August 15, 1961 – May 3, 1972
- Appointed by: John F. Kennedy
- Preceded by: Seat established by 75 Stat. 80
- Succeeded by: Hiram Emory Widener Jr.

Chief Judge of the United States District Court for the Eastern District of Virginia
- In office 1959–1961
- Preceded by: Charles Sterling Hutcheson
- Succeeded by: Walter Edward Hoffman

Judge of the United States District Court for the Eastern District of Virginia
- In office June 5, 1947 – August 23, 1961
- Appointed by: Harry S. Truman
- Preceded by: Robert Nelson Pollard
- Succeeded by: John D. Butzner Jr.

Personal details
- Born: July 23, 1899 Alexandria, Virginia
- Died: March 13, 1984 (aged 84) Fairfax, Virginia
- Resting place: Ivy Hill Cemetery; Alexandria, Virginia
- Education: University of Virginia School of Law (LLB)

Albert Vickers Bryan (July 23, 1899 – March 13, 1984) was a United States circuit judge of the United States Court of Appeals for the Fourth Circuit and previously was a United States district judge of the United States District Court for the Eastern District of Virginia and the father of another federal judge, Albert Vickers Bryan Jr.

== Education and career ==
Born in Alexandria, Virginia, Bryan received a Bachelor of Laws from University of Virginia School of Law in 1921. He was in private practice of law in Alexandria from 1921 to 1947.

== Federal judicial service ==
Bryan was nominated by President Harry S Truman on May 15, 1947, to a seat on the United States District Court for the Eastern District of Virginia vacated by Judge Robert Nelson Pollard. He was confirmed by the United States Senate on June 3, 1947, and received his commission on June 5, 1947. He served as Chief Judge from 1959 to 1961. His service was terminated on August 23, 1961, due to elevation to the Fourth Circuit.

Bryan was nominated by President John F. Kennedy on August 2, 1961, to the United States Court of Appeals for the Fourth Circuit, to a new seat created by 75 Stat. 80. He was confirmed by the Senate on August 15, 1961, and received his commission the same day. He assumed senior status on May 3, 1972. His service was terminated on March 13, 1984, due to his death in Fairfax, Virginia. He is interred in Ivy Hill Cemetery in Alexandria.

=== Notable case ===
Bryan's decisions on the Davis v. County School Board of Prince Edward County (1952) case were among those that served to implement the United States Supreme Court's ruling in Brown vs. Board of Education (1954) to force the desegregation of Virginia's public schools in the face of the so-called Massive Resistance to the ruling urged by Senator Harry F. Byrd and other Virginia political leaders.

== Honor ==
The Albert V. Bryan United States Courthouse in Alexandria was named in Bryan's honor in 1986.

Legal offices
Preceded by Robert Nelson Pollard	Judge of the United States District Court for the Eastern District of Virginia; 1947–1961	Succeeded by John D. Butzner Jr.
Preceded by Charles Sterling Hutcheson	Chief Judge of the United States District Court for the Eastern District of Virginia; 1959–1961	Succeeded by Walter Edward Hoffman
Preceded by Seat established by 75 Stat. 80	Judge of the United States Court of Appeals for the Fourth Circuit; 1961–1972	Succeeded by Hiram Emory Widener Jr.
