= Temporary protected status of Haitians in the United States =

From July 23, 2011 to July 27, 2026, Haitian nationals were offered temporary protected status in the United States. This status was initially granted due to a large influx of Haitian refugees arriving after the 2010 Haiti earthquake. Although the first Trump administration attempted to end TPS in 2017, they were delayed by two separate court orders. In 2023, the Biden administration introduced a new parole system which expedited the temporary immigration process for over 200,000 Haitians. In total, over 330,000 Haitians took advantage of TPS, allowing them to work in the US and send remittances back to Haiti. Haitians who did not qualify for TPS, or who had committed one felony or two misdemeanors, were deported. The second Trump administration ended TPS for Haiti after the Supreme Court ruling Mullin v. Doe.

== 2010 earthquake and beginning of TPS ==
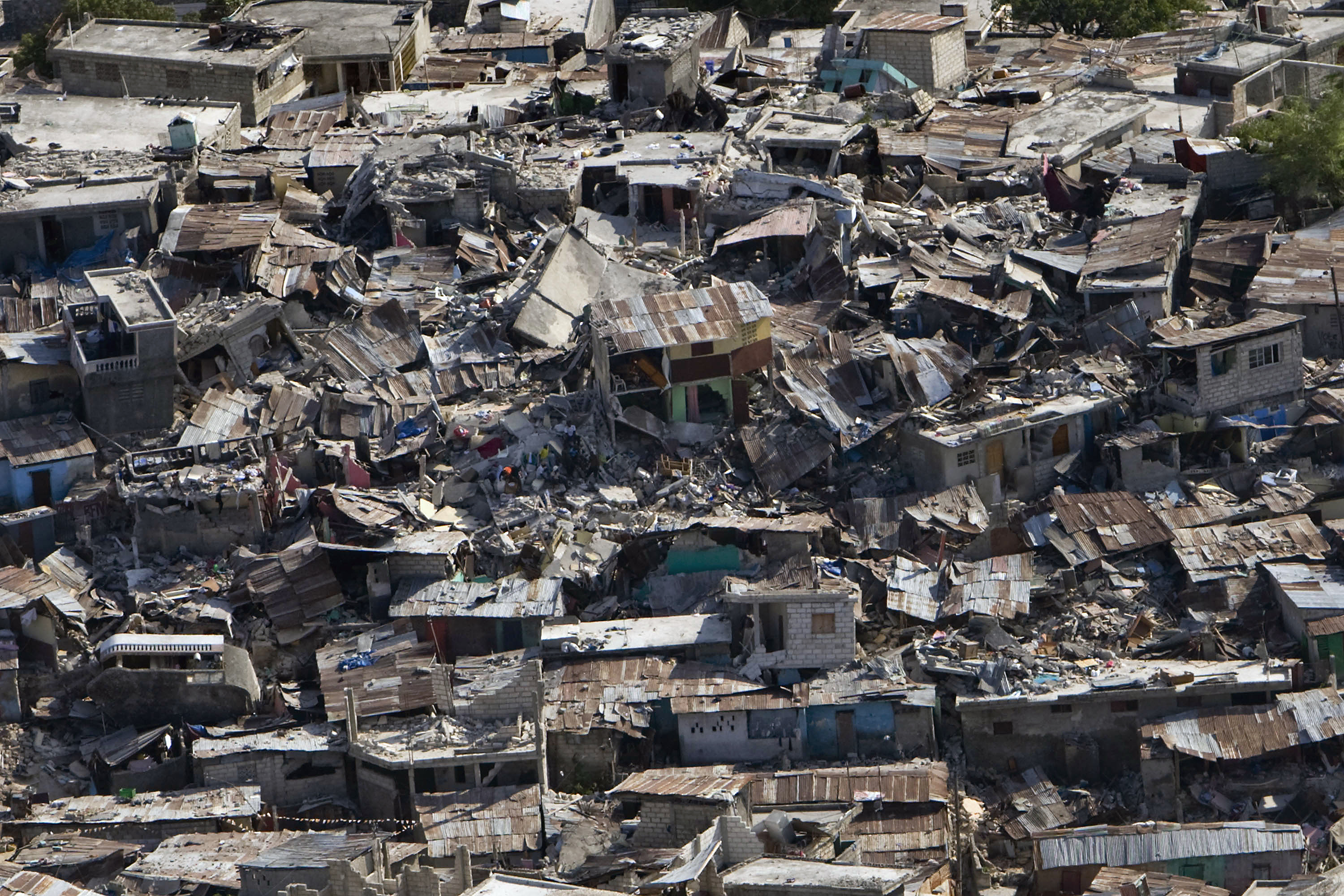
Damage from the 2010 Haiti Earthquake

A 7.0 earthquake hit Léogâne, Haiti on January 12, 2010, causing damage to about 80-90% of the city's buildings. Many other cities were destroyed and over 100,000 people were killed. This caused an influx of Haitian immigrants, mostly to Florida and New York.

In 2010, the United States granted Temporary Protected Status (TPS) for Haitians currently living in the United States after the earthquake. This allowed Haitians currently residing in the United States without legal residency and Haitian immigrants within a year of the earthquake to continue living there as refugees. Haiti was deemed unsafe and improper for Haitians to return to, and unable to support the return of these immigrants. However, the TPS only included Haitians without a certain criminal record, one felony or two misdemeanors. Over time, many of these eligible Haitians were deported from the United States.

Many Haitians living outside of Haiti experienced transnationalism, and worked in the United States to send remittances to their families in Haiti.

== Criminal deportation during TPS ==
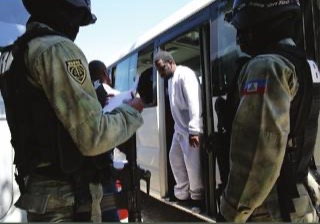
Deportees under criminal charges arriving in Haiti

Between 2010 and 2015, the five years after the earthquake, deportations to Haiti on criminal offenses began. Over 1,500 men and women were deported to Haiti due to a criminal history. Within the first year after the 2010 Haiti earthquake, criminal deportations to Haiti began. Many of those deported were lawful permanent residents who had lived in the United States for years, leaving behind family members and children. Some later died. In response, the United States halted deportations but then began again after two months.

In 2016, six years after the earthquake, the United States began removing undocumented Haitians unprotected by TPS (temporary protected status), and deported them back to Haiti. About 600 Haitians were deported in 2016. In 2017, efforts to end TPS by the national government and the Trump administration began and about 5,500 Haitian refugees were deported.

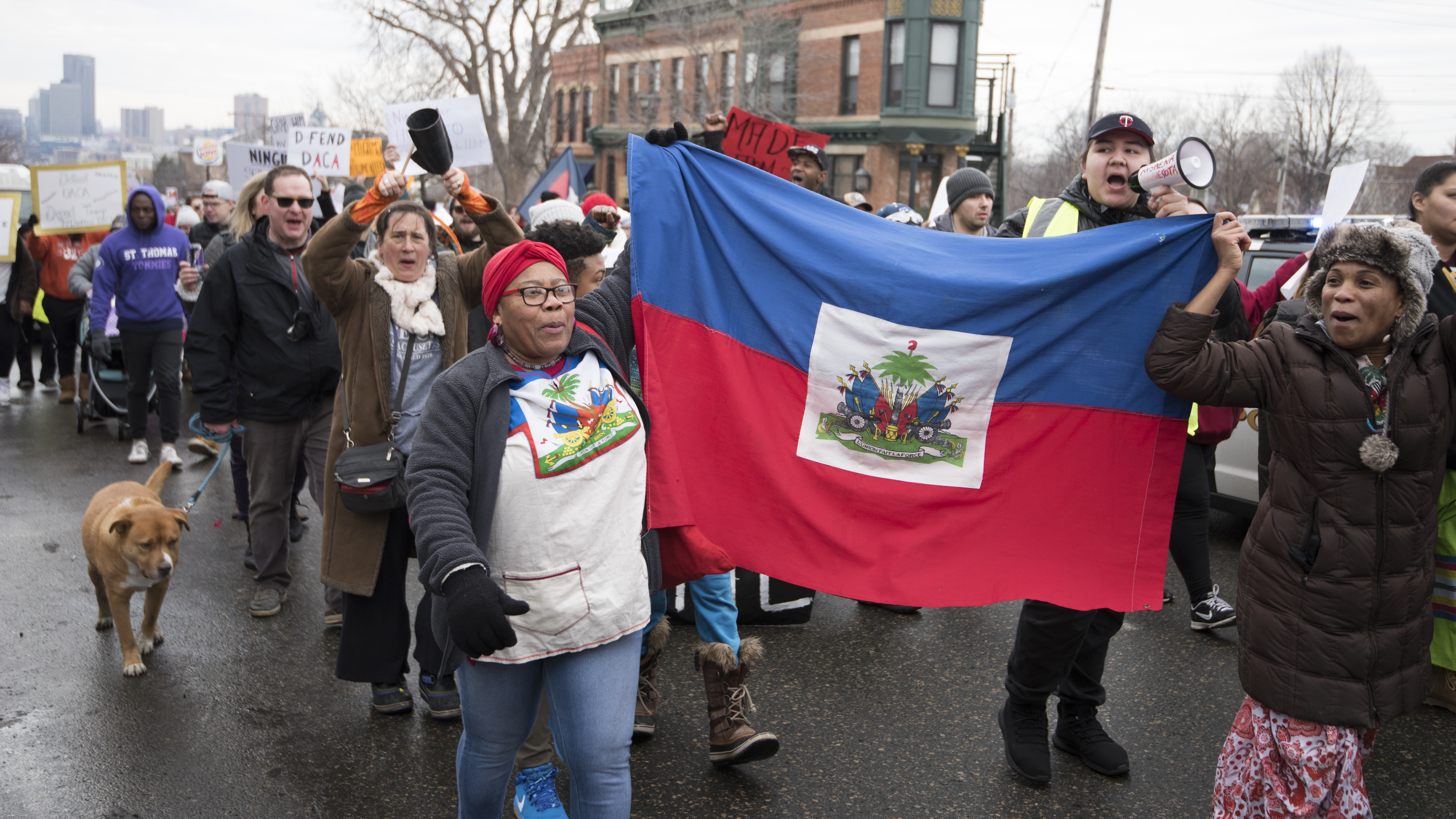
Haitian immigrants protesting Trump immigration policies

== Attempt to end TPS under the first Trump administration, 2017-21 ==
In 2017, the Trump administration attempted to end the Temporary Protection Status (TPS) for all Haitians in the United States. He claimed that the Haitian TPS because it had gone on too long and was becoming permanent rather than temporary as it was anticipated to be. In 2018, a California court ruled in Ramos v. Nielsen that Trump had violated the Administrative Procedure Act by not providing time for the public to comment on the ruling. Although this ruling was overturned on appeal in 2020, Haitians on TPS remained protected due to a different court order. The court proceedings continued through 2021, at which time President Joe Biden voluntarily withdrew the lawsuit. The department of United States Citizenship and Immigration Services automatically extended TPS documents through January 4, 2021.

From 2020 to 2022, over 18,000 Haitian nationals seeking asylum were expelled under Title 42.

== Policies under the Biden administration, 2021-25 ==
The assassination of Jovenel Moïse in July 2021 degenerated conditions in Haiti severely. It is estimated that 245,000 residents were displaced by criminal groups which attacked local police and engaged in mafia-like tactics. The country was also subject to severe weather conditions: in 2023 alone, 200,000 Haitians were displaced by torrential rain. This coincided with the new Biden administration, which was relatively lenient to refugees.

In September 2021, a group of approximately 15,000 migrants, about 95% of whom were Haitian, resided in a camp under a bridge between Del Rio, Texas and Mexico. On September 24, 2021, United States Secretary of Homeland Security Alejandro Mayorkas stated that approximately 2,000 had been deported to Haiti on 17 flights, while 5,000 were awaiting processing by Homeland Security agents, and approximately 8,000 had returned to Mexico. Thousands were freed inside the U.S. to await immigration hearings, with some 2,000 released in Houston alone, contradicting the administration's statement that Haitians entering illegally were subject to immediate deportation. By the morning of September 24, 2021, all migrants had been removed from the camp near Del Rio. On September 23, 2021, United States Special Envoy for Haiti Daniel Lewis Foote resigned in protest of the deportations, stating that "armed gangs" had made Haiti so dangerous that US officials were "confined to secure compounds".

A Federal Reserve Bank of Dallas study found that following the assassination of Moïse and the mass deportation of September 2021, Customs and Border Patrol began admitting Haitians to file asylum claims without detention or processing, starting sometime in spring 2022. In 2023, Biden standardized this practice through Parole for Cubans, Haitians, Nicaraguans, and Venezuelans (CHNV), an expedited parole process which over the two-year course of its existence admitted 211,040 Haitians for a temporary two-year stay. Haitians were able to apply for CHNV parole through a new smartphone application, CBP One.

Biden's expansion of parole and temporary protected status created non-permanent and precarious forms of legal residency for Haitians, as opposed to the permanent residency options open to affluent and well-connected Haitian immigrants.

In April 2024, after a months long pause on deportations to Haiti, the Biden administration resumed deportations to Haiti despite the ongoing crisis. In August 2024, CHNV parole was temporarily suspended due to widespread fraud, but it resumed at the end of the month.

== End of temporary protected status ==
Protest sign in the wake of the Death of Pierre Damas Bel in Ohio, hosted by various activist organizations

On January 20, 2025, the first day of the second Trump administration, Donald Trump shut off the CBP One app and ended CHNV parole. On May 30, 2025, a Supreme Court ruling upheld Trump's decision. Haitians who had entered the United States before May 2024 were still eligible to apply for TPS.

On February 3, 2026, the Trump administration announced that the TPS issued in 2010 would end, affecting 330,735 Haitian immigrants. A federal district judge barred the revocation, finding that the decision might have been grounded in "racial animus" owing to, among other things, Republican endorsements of a racialized hoax about Haitians eating cats and dogs in Springfield, Ohio. In June 2026, the Supreme Court found in a 6-3 decision that the possibility of "racial animus" was insufficient reasoning to prevent the government from revoking TPS. USCIS announced the expiration would happen on July 1, which was then shifted to July 10 and then to July 24. Confusion over the expiration date caused some companies to fire Haitian staff early.

On July 16, ICE flew 100 Haitians to Haiti, on the same day that a gangland massacre killed 61 people near Port-au-Prince. ICE announced its intention to deport 250 Haitians per week. Haiti was described as ill-equipped to handle returnees. Newsweek reported on August 6 that ICE would avoid arresting Haitians with expired TPS. However, in reality, ICE continued raids on Haitians. The end of TPS was expected to damage the health care and manufacturing sectors in the US and to devastate the Haitian economy, which was largely reliant on remittances. By July, more than 800,000 Haitian emigrés had already been forcibly returned from nearby countries such as the Dominican Republic, Jamaica, and the Bahamas.

By September, immigration authorities had required many Haitians to check in with ICE. Some were stripped of passports, fitted with ankle monitors, or offered $2,600 and free flights to self-deport. Deportation, however, posed serious risks, especially for returnees perceived as financially well-off, given kidnappings and severe gang violence in Haiti. Advocates said the immigration policy was fueling fear, anxiety, shame, and financial hardship in Springfield, Ohio, where many Haitians had settled, worked, and run businesses for several years. Pierre Damas Bel, an Ohio college student wearing an ankle monitor died by suicide after publicly describing feelings of humiliation.
