= List of significant shadow docket decisions of the United States Supreme Court =

List of significant US Supreme Court shadow docket decisions

The Supreme Court of the United States rules on cases in its shadow docket when it believes an applicant will suffer "irreparable harm" if its request is not immediately granted. Historically, the shadow docket was rarely used for rulings of serious legal or political significance. However, since 2017, it has been increasingly used for consequential rulings, especially for requests by the Department of Justice for emergency stays of lower-court rulings.

The Court usually places consequential cases on the formal merits docket (with a vote granting a writ of certiorari). Rulings from lower courts remain in place until the Supreme Court has held oral arguments and makes a formal decision that includes extensive written opinions from the majority justifying supporting or rejecting lower court rulings as well as dissent from the minority of justices who opposed the decision. This process can take months and is meant to provide comprehensive explanations and ensure a fair process.

In contrast, these shadow docket cases were placed on the emergency docket and decided and implemented rapidly even though they were widely consequential. Some of these rulings were temporary until the Court heard the case in the regular merits docket, usually many months later. But if the Court did not decide to bring the case to the merits docket, it became the final decision, often changing the status quo and confusing lower courts by overturning long-standing precedent without explanation. Some of these cases were decided even before appellate courts had a chance to consider or rule on them. In the 2025 term, for the first time, the Court made more consequential shadow docket decisions than merit docket decisions.

Below is a list of shadow docket rulings that are considered particularly significant because they meet several of these criteria:

- paused lower-court stays or overturned lower-court decisions
- appeared to upend long-standing precedent or be inconsistent with previous emergency rulings
- effectively resolved a case due to real-world deadlines, particularly in death penalty cases
- had wide consequences
- received extensive media attention
- was decided by a split vote indicating a divided Court
- elicited public dissent from some of the justices
- were unsigned, leaving it unclear which justices supported it
- lacked a substantive written decision, leaving the public and lower courts without a clear understanding of the Court's reasoning

These significant decisions are listed by the term year (Note: Each Supreme Court term officially begins on October 1 and extends through the next calendar year to September 30. But note that Court Docket numbering begins for the next term at the start of the Court recess on July 1.) and then grouped by issue area and chronologically. Each entry has the shadow docket case number (with a link to the Supreme Court Order Docket), a shortened case name, the date of the decision, a short summary of that decision and why it was particularly significant, and if known, the vote total and any dissenting opinions.

== 2006 ==
=== Voting restrictions ===
- 06A375 Purcell v. Gonzalez, October 20, 2006. Allowed a new Arizona voter ID law to remain in effect during the 2006 election by vacating an injunction by the Ninth Circuit. In subsequent years, the per curium opinion has been frequently cited to justify leaving in place state election rules. Decided unanimously. Justice Stevens filed a concurring opinion.

== 2013 ==
=== Voting restrictions ===
- 14A336 Husted v. Ohio NAACP, September 29, 2014. Allowed Ohio to cut the number of early voting days from 35 to 28 days including the “Golden Week,” when Ohioans could register and vote on the same day, as well as Sundays when many African-American churches had conducted “Souls to the Polls” drives after services. Justices Ginsburg, Breyer, Kagan, and Sotomayor would have denied the application for stay.

== 2014 ==
=== Voting restrictions ===
- 14A393 Veasey v. Perry, October 18, 2014. Allowed Texas' restrictive voter ID law to remain in effect through the 2014 election. Justices Ginsburg, Sotomayor, and Kagan dissented.

== 2015 ==
February 2016 West Virginia v. EPA order

=== Environmental protection ===
- 15A773 West Virginia v. EPA, February 9, 2016. Stopped the Environmental Protection Agency's Clean Power Plan. The vote was 5–4. Justices Ginsburg, Breyer, Sotomayor, and Kagan would have denied the application. This was the first time the Court had stayed a regulation before a federal appeals court review. This ruling allowed opponents of the climate change policy to delay its implementation for years. This ruling is widely cited as the starting point for the modern era of the Supreme Court using its shadow docket to influence national policy. This understanding was bolstered by internal Supreme Court memos obtained by a New York Times investigation that concluded that that decision "marks the birth, many legal experts believe, of the court's modern 'shadow docket,' the secretive track that the Supreme Court has since used to make many major decisions, including granting President Trump more than 20 key victories on issues from immigration to agency power."

== 2016 ==
=== Travel ban ===
- 16A1190 Trump v. International Refugee Assistance Project, (and 16A1911 Trump v. Hawaii), June 26, 2017. Allowed the Trump administration to block foreign nationals from certain countries who lacked a "bona fide relationship with a person or entity in the United States." Justices Alito, Gorsuch, and Thomas concurred in part and dissented in part.

== 2017 ==
=== Travel ban ===
- 17A550 Trump v. Hawaii, December 4, 2017. Allowed President Trump to fully ban travelers from several Muslim-majority countries. Justices Ginsburg and Sotomayor would have denied the application.

== 2018 ==
=== Transgender soldiers ===
- 18A625 Trump v. Karnoski and 18A627 Stockman v. Trump, January 22, 2019. Allowed President Trump to ban transgender troops from the military. Justices Ginsburg, Breyer, Sotomayor, and Kagan would have denied the application.

=== Death penalty ===
- 18A815 Dunn v. Ray, February 6, 2019. Dismissed a Muslim prisoner's challenge to an Alabama policy that prevented him from having his imam instead of a Christian chaplain with him as he died. Justices Kagan, Ginsburg, Breyer, and Sotomayor dissented.
- 18A985 Murphy v. Collier, March 28, 2019. Allowed a death row inmate to have his Buddhist spiritual advisor with him in the death chamber and prevented his execution until Texas prison officials changed their policy. Justices Thomas, Gorsuch, and Kavanaugh dissented.
- 18A1238 Price v. Dunn, May 30, 2019. In a late night decision, refused to allow a death row inmate to be executed by nitrogen gas instead of lethal injection. Justices Breyer, Ginsburg, Sotomayor, and Kagan dissented.

=== Border wall ===
- 19A60 Trump v. Sierra Club, July 26, 2019. Allowed President Trump to redirect $2.5 billion in military funds to build part of a wall on the southern border with Mexico. Justices Ginsburg, Sotomayor, and Kagan would have denied the application. Justice Breyer dissented in part.

=== Immigration ===
- 19A230 Barr v. East Bay Sanctuary, September 11, 2019. Allowed the "transit rule" to stay in place. This rule blocked asylum for anyone who passed through another country before they reached the US southern border. Justices Sotomayor and Ginsburg dissented.

== 2019 ==
=== Immigration ===
- 19A960 Wolf v. Innovation Law Lab, March 11, 2020. Allowed the Trump administration to continue enforcing its Migrant Protection Protocols, also called the "Remain in Mexico" policy, that prevented asylum seekers from entering the US while waiting for a hearing in US immigration court. Justice Sotomayor would have denied the application.

=== Voting and preventing the spread of COVID-19 during the pandemic ===
- 19A1016 Republican National Committee v. Democratic National Committee, April 6, 2020. On the day before the April 7 election, refused to extend the deadline for absentee voting by six days despite the pandemic that had scared voters away from in-person voting. Justices Ginsburg, Breyer, Sotomayor, and Kagan dissented.
- 19A60 Sierra Club v. Trump, July 31, 2020. Allowed the Trump administration to continue constructing a border wall along the US southern border. Justice Breyer dissented. Justices Ginsburg, Sotomayor, and Kagan would not have granted the application.

=== Death penalty ===
- 20A8 Barr v. Lee, July 14, 2020. Vacated a preliminary injunction. The ruling provided a brief explanation of the Court's majority thinking in execution cases (it is important to stop unjustified delays). Justices Breyer, Ginsburg, Sotomayor, and Kagan dissented.

=== Voting restrictions ===
- 19A1071 Raysor v. DeSantis, July 16, 2020. Allowed Florida to bar almost a million people with felony convictions from voting unless they have paid court fines and fees (also called the "pay-to-vote system"). Justices Sotomayor, Ginsburg, and Kagan dissented.

== 2020 ==
=== Election procedures ===
- 20A55 Andino v. Middleton, October 5, 2020. Allowed South Carolina to require that another individual must witness a voter's signature on an absentee ballot envelope despite the danger during the COVID-19 pandemic. Justices Thomas, Alito, and Gorsuch would have granted the application in full. Justice Kavanaugh concurred.
- 20A54 Republican Party of Pennsylvania v. Boockvar, October 19, 2020. Rejected Republican effort right before the election to end a Pennsylvania policy to count mail-in votes that were mailed on or before Election Day and received after election day. Justices Thomas, Alito, Gorsuch, and Kavanaugh would have granted the application.
- 20A67 Merrill v. People First of Alabama, October 21, 2020. Stopped Alabama counties from implementing curbside voting for voters with disabilities during the COVID-19 pandemic. Justices Sotomayor, Breyer, and Kagan dissented in part.

=== Census ===
- 20A62 Ross v. National Urban League, October 13, 2020. Forced the Census Bureau to stop collecting census data despite delays caused by the COVID-19 pandemic, clearing the way for President Trump to try to exclude unauthorized immigrants from the numbers used to reallocate congressional seats. Justice Sotomayor dissented.

=== Religious freedom and preventing the spread of COVID-19 during the pandemic ===
- 20A87 Roman Catholic Diocese of Brooklyn v. Cuomo, November 25, 2020. Prevented occupancy limits on religious services during the COVID-19 pandemic. Justices Gorsuch and Kavanaugh filed concurring opinions. Chief Justice Roberts filed a dissenting opinion. Justices Breyer, Sotomayor, and Kagan filed a separate dissenting opinion.
- 20A136 South Bay United Pentecostal Church v. Newsom ("South Bay II"), February 5, 2021. Stopped the statewide COVID-19 prohibition on indoor worship services (but not other public gatherings) and went beyond any decisions made in lower courts. The justices published multiple opinions.
- 20A138 Gateway City Church v. Newsom, February 26, 2021. Stopped another prohibition against indoor worship services citing as precedent the shadow docket decision in South Bay United Pentecostal Church v. Newsom. Justices Kagan, Breyer, and Sotomayor dissented.
- 20A151 Tandon v. Newsom, April 9, 2021. Stopped COVID-related restrictions on in-home Bible study and prayer meetings. The Court rebuked the Ninth Circuit Court of Appeals for not following four prior Supreme Court shadow docket orders involving California COVID-19 restrictions thus declaring giving shadow docket rulings precedential value. Chief Justice Roberts would deny the application. Justices Kagan, Breyer, and Sotomayor dissented.

=== Death penalty ===
- 20A134 United States v. Higgs, January 15, 2021. Denied a death row inmate's request for reconsideration. The Court took the unprecedented step of granting certiorari before judgment and summarily reversed a district court opinion without explanation.
- 20A128 Dunn v. Smith, February 11, 2021. Denied a death row inmate's request to have his pastor in the execution chamber. This decision appears to be inconsistent with earlier free-exercise-of-religion rulings. The justices published multiple conflicting opinions.

=== Immigration ===
- 21A21 Biden v. Texas, August 24, 2021. Required the Biden administration to implement the Migrant Protection Protocols (MPP), also known as the "Remain in Mexico policy," in which the government returns asylum seekers who cross the southern US border to Mexico instead of letting them remain while their asylum case is considered. Justice Breyer, Justice Sotomayor, and Justice Kagan would have granted the application.

=== Preventing the spread of COVID-19 during the pandemic ===
- 21A23 Alabama Association of Realtors v. Department of Health and Human Services, August 26, 2021. Ended the eviction moratorium established during the COVID-19 pandemic and allowed landlords and realtors to evict tenants. Justices Breyer, Sotomayor, and Kagan dissented.

=== Abortion ===
- 20A34 FDA v. American College of Obstetricians and Gynecologists, January 12, 2021. Overturned a lower court order and reinstated the FDA’s in-person requirements for picking up a prescribed abortion drug during the COVID-19 pandemic. Chief Justice Roberts concurred. Justices Breyer, Sotomayor, and Kagan dissented.
- 21A24 Whole Woman's Health v. Jackson, September 1, 2021. Refused to block Texas's "Heartbeat Act," which banned all abortions after the sixth week of pregnancy, overturning the precedent set by Roe v. Wade. Justices Roberts, Breyer, Kagan, and Sotomayar dissented.

== 2021 ==
=== Workplace safety during the COVID-19 pandemic ===
- 21A244 National Federation of Independent Business (NFIB) v. Department of Labor, Occupational Safety and Health Administration (OSHA), January 13, 2022. Blocked OSHA's vaccinate-or-test rule for businesses with 100 or more employees designed to protect employees during the Covid pandemic. Justices Gorsuch, Thomas, and Alito concurred. Justices Breyer, Sotomayor, and Kagan dissented.

=== Vaccines during the COVID-19 Pandemic ===
- 21A240 Biden v. Missouri, January 13, 2022. Allowed the Centers for Medicare & Medicaid Services' (CMS) to require vaccines for healthcare workers at facilities receiving federal funds. Justices Thomas, Alito, Gorsuch and Barrett dissented.

=== Racial gerrymandering ===
- 21A375 Merrill v. Milligan, February 7, 2022. Reinstated, until after the 2022 election, an Alabama Congressional map. This map had only one majority-Black district (out of 7) even though a quarter of the state's population is Black, and lower courts ruled this map violated the Voting Rights Act. Justices Kavanaugh and Alito concurred in granting of applications for stay. Chief Justice Roberts and justices Kagan, Breyer, and Sotomayor dissented.
- 21A471 Wisconsin Legislature v. Wisconsin Elections Commission, March 23, 2022. Reinstated Wisconsin's outdated and discriminatory maps for the state legislature. Justices Sotomayor and Kagan dissented.
- 21A814 Ardoin v. Robinson, June 28, 2022. Overturned lower court rulings and allowed a congressional redistricting map to remain in place until after the 2022 election. The map was drawn by the Louisiana legislature and included only one majority-Black district (out of 6) even though a third of Louisiana's population is Black and the Black population had increased from the previous cycle. Justices Breyer, Sotomayor, and Kagan would have denied the application for stay and dissented from the treatment of the application as a petition for a writ of certiorari before judgment and the granting of certiorari before judgment.

=== Environmental protection ===
- 21A539 Louisiana v. American Rivers, April 6, 2022. Prevented states from blocking infrastructure projects that could contaminate rivers, lakes, and streams. Justices Kagan, Roberts, Breyer, and Sotomayor dissented.

== 2022 ==
=== Death penalty ===
- 22A441 Hamm v. Smith, November 17, 2022. Allowed Kenneth Eugene Smith to be executed, though later the state called off the execution after having trouble inserting the necessary IV lines in Smith's veins. Justices Sotomayor, Kagan, and Jackson would have denied the application.
- 22A941 Glossip v. Oklahoma, May 5, 2023. Granted an emergency stay of execution for death row inmate Richard Glossip, which was crucial in saving his life and highlighting the many irregularities in his case, including that the prosecution violated its constitutional obligation to correct false testimony. Justice Gorsuch recused himself.

=== Trump tax returns ===
- 22A362 Trump v. Committee on Ways and Means, November 22, 2022. Declined to overturn a ruling by the DC Circuit Court of Appeals allowing the House of Representatives Ways and Means Committee to receive former President Trump's tax returns for 2015–2020.

=== Immigration ===
- 22A544 Arizona v. Alejandro Mayorkas, December 27, 2022. Allowed US border officials to continue expelling migrants under Title 42, a public health law that does not permit migrants to request asylum. Top officials at the US Centers for Disease Control and Prevention (CDC) under both the Trump and Biden administrations said that Title 42 would curb the spread of the coronavirus, but this was disputed by outside experts and found unlawful. Justices Sotomayor and Kagan would have denied the application. Justices Gorsuch and Jackson dissented.

=== Abortion drugs ===
- 22A902 FDA v. Alliance for Hippocratic Medicine and 22A901 Danco Laboratories v. Alliance for Hippocratic Medicine, April 21, 2023. Allowed the abortion pill mifepristone to remain available while litigation plays out in a lower court. For both cases, Justice Alito dissented and Justice Thomas would have denied the application for stay.

=== Environmental protection ===
- 23A35 Mountain Valley Pipeline, LLC v. The Wilderness Society, July 27, 2023. Allowed completion of the Mountain Valley Pipeline even while lower court cases proceeded.

=== Gun control ===
- 23A82 Garland v. VanDerStok, August 8, 2023. Allowed the Biden administration to reinstate a federal regulation aimed at reining in firearms called "ghost guns" that are assembled from parts, lack a serial number, and are difficult for law enforcement to trace. Justices Thomas, Alito, Gorsuch, and Kavanaugh would have denied the application for stay.

== 2023 ==
=== Gun control ===
- 23A302 Garland v Blackhawk Manufacturing, October 16, 2023. Once again (see 23A82 Garland v. VanDerStok, August 8, 2023) allowed the federal government to ban "ghost guns" after lower courts tried to countermand the Supreme Court's earlier decision.

=== Misinformation ===
- 23A243 Murthy v. Missouri, October 20, 2023. Allowed Biden administration officials to continue to contact social media platforms and urge them to remove misinformation. Justices Alito, Thomas, and Gorsuch dissented from grant of application for stay.

=== Abortion ===
- 23A469 Moyle v. United States and 23A470 Idaho v. United States, January 5, 2024. Allowed Idaho to enforce its strict abortion ban that prevented abortions even in medical emergencies.

=== Immigration and the border ===
- 23A607 Department of Homeland Security v. Texas, January 22, 2024. Allowed federal border agents to cut concertina wire put up by Texas officials near the border with Mexico and upheld longstanding court rulings that the Constitution gives the federal government sole responsibility for border security. Justices Thomas, Alito, Gorsuch, and Kavanaugh would have denied the application to vacate injunction.

=== Transgender minors ===
- 23A763 Labrador v. Poe, April 15, 2024. Allowed Idaho officials to enforce a strict statewide ban on puberty-blocking drugs, hormone therapy, and certain surgeries to transgender minors. Justices Gorsuch, Thomas, and Alito concurred in the grant of stay. Justices Kavanaugh and Barrett concurred in the grant of stay in a second opinion. Justices Jackson and Sotomayor dissented from grant of stay, and Justice Kagan would have denied the application for stay.

=== Privacy ===
- 23A925 Free Speech Coalition v. Paxton, April 30, 2024. Allowed Texas to enforce a law requiring age verification to access pornography websites even though it made adults submit personally identifying information over the Internet.

=== Racial gerrymandering ===
- 23A994 Robinson v. Callais and 23A1002 Landry v. Callais, May 15, 2024. Just before the candidate filing deadline, upheld a new congressional redistricting plan for Louisiana that provided for a second majority-Black district, but scheduled a further challenge after the 2024 election cycle. Justice Jackson dissented and Justices Sotomayor and Kagan would have denied the application for stay.

=== Environmental protection ===
- 23A349 Ohio v. Environmental Protection Agency, June 27, 2024. Stopped enforcement of the EPA's "Good Neighbor" rule, which aimed to reduce air pollution affecting downwind states, for states whose own plans the EPA deemed inadequate. Justice Gorsuch wrote the majority opinion, which won 5–4. Justices Barrett, Sotomayor, Kagan, and Jackson dissented.

=== Death penalty ===
- 23A1160 Gutierrez v. Saenz, July 16, 2024. Stopped the execution of Ruben Guterrez 20 minutes before his execution. Gutierrez asked for DNA testing that would prove he was not responsible for the fatal stabbing of an 85-year-old woman during a home robbery.
- 24A290 Marcellus Williams v. Missouri, September 24, 2024. Denied a death row inmate's request for reconsideration even though DNA evidence appeared to exonerate him and his prosecutors, jurors, and even the family of the victim opposed his execution. Justices Sotomayor, Kagan, and Jackson would have granted the application for stay.

=== LGBTQ+ ===
- 24A78 Department of Education v. Louisiana, August 16, 2024. Blocked the Department of Education from protecting LGBTQ+ people from discrimination. Justices Sotomayor, Kagan, Gorsuch, and Jackson dissented in part.

=== Voting restrictions ===
- 24A164 Republican National Committee v. Mi Familia Vota, August 22, 2024. Just before a presidential election, allowed an Arizona state law requiring proof of citizenship to be reinstated, but did allow voters who registered with the standard federal form to vote without providing proof of citizenship. Justices Thomas, Alito, and Gorsuch would have granted the application in full. Justices Sotomayor, Kagan, Barrett, and Jackson would have denied the application in full.

=== Student loan payments ===
- 24A173 Biden v. Missouri, August 28, 2024. Blocked the Biden administration's new student debt relief plan — the Saving on a Valuable Education (SAVE) plan, an income-driven repayment program intended to provide debt relief, particularly for lower-income borrowers recovering from the COVID-19 pandemic.
- 24A11 Alaska v. Department of Education, August 28, 2024. Further blocked the Biden administrations's SAVE plan.

== 2024 ==
=== Elections ===
- 24A407 Beals v. Virginia Coalition for Immigrant Rights, October 30, 2024. Paused a lower court order and allowed Virginia to continue its voter removal program just before the election. Justices Sotomayor, Kagan, and Jackson would have denied the request.
- 25A62 Turtle Mountain Band of Chippewa Indians v. Howe, July 24, 2025. Left the Voting Rights Act in place for now. Justices Thomas, Alito, and Gorsuch would have denied the application.

=== Government grants ===
- 24A831 Department of State v. AIDS Vaccine Advocacy Coalition, March 5, 2025. Forced the Trump administration to reimburse USAID contractors for federal foreign-assistance work already completed. Justices Alito, Thomas, Gorsuch, and Kavanaugh dissented.
- 24A910 Department of Education v. California, April 4, 2025. Allowed the Trump administration to withhold previously granted funding to states and cities, impacting various programs. The Court reasoned that disbursed funds would likely be unrecoverable if the government ultimately prevailed, while withholding them temporarily posed no irreversible harm to recipients. Chief Justice Roberts would have denied the application. Justices Kagan, Sotomayor, and Jackson dissented.
- 25A103 National Institutes of Health (NIH) v. American Public Health Association (APHA), August 21, 2025. Allowed $800 million in research funding to be cancelled. The justices disagreed in various ways with Chief Justice Roberts and justices Sotomayor, Kagan, and Jackson mostly denying the application and justices Thomas, Alioto, Gorsuch, and Kavanaugh mostly granting.
- 25A269 Department of State v. AIDS Vaccine Advocacy Coalition, September 26, 2025. Allowed the Trump administration to withhold $4 billion in foreign aid funding approved by Congress. Justices Kagan, Sotomayor, and Jackson dissented.

=== Immigration ===
- 24A931 Trump v. J.G.G., April 7, 2025. Upheld due process for Venezuelan nationals alleged to be members of a terrorist group before they can be shipped to a prison in El Salvador, but made the process more difficult for immigrants to secure that due process. Justice Kavanaugh concurred. Justices Sotomayor, Kagan, and Jackson dissented and Justice Barrett partially joined that dissent.
- 24A949 Noem v. Abrego Garcia, April 10, 2025. Required the Government to return Abrego Garcia from El Salvador and ensure that his case be handled as it would have been had he not been improperly sent to El Salvador. However, the Court also critiqued another aspect of the lower court's order and sent the case back for further litigation. Justices Sotomayor, Kagan, and Jackson dissented that part.
- 24A1007 A.A.R.P. v. Trump, May 16, 2025. Blocked the removal of a proposed class of Venezuelan men in immigration custody under the 1798 Alien Enemies Act. The Court emphasized that due process requires sufficient notice and a real opportunity to contest removal before deportations proceed. Justice Kavanaugh concurred. Justices Alito and Thomas dissented.
- 24A1059 Noem v. National TPS Alliance, May 19, 2025. Allowed the Secretary of Homeland Security to prematurely remove "temporary protected status" (TPS) (that protects people from war-torn countries) from Venezuelans living in the United States thus subjecting them to deportation. Justice Jackson would have denied the application.
- 24A1079 Noem v. Doe, May 30, 2025. Allowed Secretary of Homeland Security to revoke a categorical grant of parole and work authorizations of over 400,000 non-citizens from Cuba, Haiti, Nicaragua, and Venezuela, without conducting individualized assessments. Justices Jackson and Sotomayor dissented.
- 24A1153 Department of Homeland Security v. D.V.D., June 23, 2025. Allowed the Trump administration to continue deporting people without a hearing to countries other than the one they are from and where they might be tortured or killed. Justices Sotomayor, Kagan, and Jackson dissented.
- 25A169 Noem v. Vasquez Perdomo, September 8, 2025. Allowed the Trump administration's immigration enforcement based on racial profiling to continue. Justice Kavanaugh concurred. Justices Sotomayor, Kagan, and Jackson dissented.

=== Government employees ===
- 24A904 Office of Personnel Management v. American Federation of Government Employees, April 8, 2025. Allowed the Office of Personnel Management (OPM) to fire probationary workers. Justices Sotomayor and Jackson would have denied the application.
- 24A1174 Trump v. American Federation of Government Employees, July 8, 2025. Allowed the Trump administration to slash the federal work force and dismantle federal agencies without input from Congress. Justice Sotomayor concurred. Justice Jackson dissented.
- 24A1203 McMahon v New York, July 14, 2025. Allowed the Trump administration to proceed with dismantling the Education Department by firing more than a thousand workers and without input from Congress. Justices Sotomayor, Kagan, and Jackson dissented.

=== Transgender ===
- 24A1030 United States v. Shilling, May 6, 2025. Banned transgender individuals serving in the military. Justices Sotomayor, Kagan, and Jackson would have denied the application.
- 24A1051 Libby v. Fecteau, May 20, 2025. Ordered the Maine legislature to count the votes of a Republican lawmaker who was censured for identifying a transgender teen athlete in a social-media post and was censured by the House for putting the student at risk. Justice Jackson dissented and Justice Sotomayor would have denied the application.

=== Independent agencies ===
- 24A966 Trump v. Wilcox, May 22, 2025. Allowed the Trump administration to fire members of the National Labor Relations Board (NLRB) and Merit Systems Protection Board (MSPB) without cause, overturning long-standing precedent from Humphrey's Executor v. FTC (1935). Justices Kagan, Sotomayor, and Jackson dissented.
- 25A11 Trump v. Boyle, July 23, 2025. Allowed the Trump administration to fire members of the Consumer Product Safety Commission and cited shadow docket case 24A966 Trump v. Wilcox as precedent. Justice Kavanaugh concurred. Justices Kagan, Sotomayor, and Jackson dissented.
- 25A264 Trump v. Slaughter, September 22, 2025. Allowed the Trump administration to fire the director of the Federal Trade Commission. Justices Kagan, Sotomayor, and Jackson dissented.

=== Department of Government Efficiency ===
- 24A1122 U.S. Doge Service v. Citizens for Responsibility and Ethics in Washington, June 6, 2025. Stopped Freedom of Information Act (FOIA) requests for DOGE information materials. Justices Sotomayor, Kagan, and Jackson would have denied the application.

=== Privacy ===
- 24A1063 Social Security Administration v. American Federation of State, County, and Municipal Employees, June 6, 2025. Allowed the Department of Government Efficiency to access American's sensitive Social Security data. Justices Jackson and Sotomayor dissented.

=== Citizenship ===
- 24A884 Trump v. CASA Inc., June 27, 2025. Consolidated on April 17, 2025, with 24A885 Trump v. Washington and 24A886 Trump v. New Jersey. Instead of addressing the Trump administration's restrictions on birthright citizenship directly, the Court decided that lower-court judges do not have the authority to issue "universal injunctions" to block the enforcement of policies nationwide but only for those specifically filing the lawsuit, a major procedural shift with far-reaching consequences for challenges to federal policies. Justice Barrett wrote the majority opinion. Justices Thomas, Alito, and Kavanaugh filed separate concurrences. Justice Gorsuch joined Thomas's concurrence and Thomas joined Alito's concurrence. Justices Sotomayor, Kagan, and Jackson dissented.

=== Education ===
- 24A1203 McMahon v. New York, July 14, 2025. Allowed the Trump administration to continue dismantling the Department of Education. Justices Sotomayor, Kagan, and Jackson dissented.

== 2025 ==
=== Immigration ===
- 25A326 Noem v. National TPS Alliance, October 4, 2025. Once again (see Shadow Docket Case 24A1059 Noem v. National TPS Alliance, May 19, 2025), allowed the Secretary of Homeland Security to remove "temporary protected status" (TPS) (that protects people from war-torn countries) from over 500,000 Venezuelan nationals living in the United States thus subjecting them to deportation. Justices Sotomayor and Kagan would have denied the application. Justice Jackson dissented.
- 26A406 Department of Homeland Security v. D. V. D., September 29, 2026. Allowed federal officials to deport migrants to third countries without prior notice. Justices Sotomayor, Kagen, and Jackson would have denied the stay.

=== Transgender ===
- 25A319 Trump v. Orr, November 6, 2025. Allowed the Trump administration to require US passports to show the sex designation of the traveler's biological sex at birth rather than their current self-identified sex thus possibly subjecting them to harassment. Justices Jackson, Kagen, and Sotomayor dissented.
- 25A810 Mirabelli v. Bonta, March 2, 2026. Reinstated a district court decision that California schools must inform parents if their child identifies as transgender. Justices Thomas and Alito would have granted the application in full. Justices Barrett, Roberts, and Kavanaugh concurred. Justice Sotomayor would have denied the application in full. Justices Kagan and Jackson dissented.

=== SNAP ===
- 25A539 Rhode Island State Council of Churches v. Rollins, November 11, 2025. Stayed a lower court order which allowed the Trump administration to continue to withhold full food stamp benefits for three more days until lawmakers ended the government shutdown. Justice Jackson would have denied the request for extension of the administrative stay and would have denied the application. This decision allowed the Court to avoid any substantive legal ruling about whether lower court orders to keep full payments flowing during the shutdown were correct.

=== Gerrymandering ===
- 25A608 Abbott v. League of United Latin American Citizens, December 4, 2025. Allowed the newly redistricted Congressional map in Texas to be used in the 2026 election even though the lower court found that Republicans in the state legislature had drawn districts to deliberately limit the ability of racial minorities to win seats. Justices Alito, Thomas, and Gorsuch concurred. Justices Kagan, Sotomayor. and Jackson dissented.
- 25A839 Tangipa v. Newsom, February 4, 2026. Allowed California to use a gerrymandered congressional map enacted by Proposition 50, which was authored by Democrats and approved in November, in the 2026 election.
- 25A914 Malliotakis v. Williams and 25A915 Kosinski v. Williams, March 2, 2026. Stopped a New York state court’s order to redraw a Republican-leaning district, allowing the current map to remain in place for the 2026 midterms, despite a lower-court ruling that it illegally diluted the power of minority voters. The Supreme Court also acted before the state high court had a chance to weigh in. Justice Alito concurred. Justices Sotomayor, Kagan, and Jackson dissented.
- 25A1197 Callais v. Louisiana, May 4, 2026. After outlawing racially-based voting districts in Louisiana v. Callais, granted permission to immediately allow Louisiana to draw partisan maps (instead of waiting the customary 32 days) so the new lines could be used in the election that had been underway but was postponed. Justice Alito, Thomas, and Gorsuch concurred. Justice Jackson dissented.
- 25A1314 Allen v. Milligan, 25A1315 Allen v. Singleton, and 25A1316 Allen v. Caster, June 2, 2026. See also: 21A375 Merrill v. Milligan, February 7, 2022. Overturned a unanimous ruling by a lower court and allowed Alabama to use a congressional map in the 2026 elections that lower courts had found to be intentionally designed to be racially discriminatory. Justices Sotomayor, Kagan, and Jackson dissented.
- 25-234 State Board of Election Commissioners v. NAACP and 25-253 Turtle Mountain Band of Chippewa Indians v. Howe, May 18, 2026. Nullified two lower court rulings in Mississippi and North Dakota cases and sent them back to the lower courts for reconsideration in light of the Court's recent ruling in 25A1197 Louisiana v. Callais. Justice Jackson dissented.
- 26A326 People Not Politicians v. Onder, September 10, 2026. Affirmed the decision of the Missouri Supreme Court to block the 2025 gerrymandered Congressional map contested by a citizen referendum on the November 2026 ballot and use the earlier less-gerrymandered map. 26A388, September 25, 2026. The Supreme Court reaffirmed its previous decision.

=== National Guard ===
- 25A443 Trump v. Illinois, December 23, 2025. In a 3-page decision, supported lower courts and blocked the Trump administration from ordering National Guard troops to the Chicago area to provide support for federal immigration officials carrying out deportations over the objection of Illinois officials. Justice Kavanaugh concurred in the judgment. Justices Alito, Thomas, and Gorsuch dissented.

=== Abortion drugs ===
- 25A1207 Danco Laboratories v. Louisiana, May 14, 2026. Allowed women to continue to obtain a widely-used abortion medication (mifepristone) by mail while the case proceeds through lower courts. Justices Thomas and Alito dissented.

=== Federal Reserve ===
- 25A312 Trump v. Cook, June 29, 2026. In contrast to the 25-332 Trump v. Slaughter merit ruling made the same day that allowed President Trump to fire an FTC commissioner, and after a drawn-out process including an oral hearing in January, the Court ruled that Lisa Cook could not be fired by President Trump and could remain on the Federal Reserve Board of Governors as lower court litigation against her continues. Justices Roberts, Sotomayor, Kagen, Kavanaugh, and Jackson voted in favor. Justices Kavanaugh and Jackson filed a concurring opinion. Justice Thomas filed one dissenting opinion, Justices Alito and Gorsuch filed another, and Justice Barret filed a third.

=== White House Construction ===
- 26A203 National Park Service v. National Trust for Historic Preservation, August 21, 2026. Stayed a lower court injunction, allowing construction to proceed on President Trump's White House Ballroom/security complex without Congress’s permission. Decided by Chief Justice Roberts alone.
- 26A203 National Park Service v. National Trust for Historic Preservation, August 31, 2026. Allowed construction to continue on President Trump’s massive White House ballroom, ruling the Trust does not have legal standing to stop construction. Justices Roberts, Sotomayor, Kagan, and Jackson dissented.

=== 2026 Election ===
- 26A124 Donald Trump v. California, August 24, 2026. Stayed a lower court ruling and allowed the Trump administration to move forward with plans to restrict mail-in voting before the midterm elections through the US Postal Service. Justices Sotomayor, Kagan, and Jackson dissented.
- 26A274 National Republican Congressional Committee v. Sherrod Brown, September 4, 2026. Decided that political parties are entitled to the same low-cost TV ad rates as candidates. Justice Jackson dissented.
- 26A305 United States Postal Service v. California, September 14, 2026. Supported two lower court injunctions blocking the US Postal Service from imposing new ballot requirements on states. This decision came after voting by mail had already begun in several states. President Trump had ordered these restrictive requirements in March. Justice Kavanaugh concurred. Justices Alito and Thomas dissented.
- 26A308 Department of Homeland Security v. League of Women Voters, September 25, 2026. Stayed a lower court ruling and allowed states to verify the eligibility of voters by using a Department of Homeland computer program called Systematic Alien Verification for Entitlements (SAVE) despite the program's use of voters’ sensitive personal data and its tendency to wrongly flag some eligible voters as noncitizens. Justices Jackson, Sotomayor, and Kagan dissented.

== 2026 ==
=== Environmental protection ===
- 26A560 Homeland Security v. Friends of the Ruidosa Church, November 9, 2026. Overturned a lower court and allowed the Trump administration to continue construction of a border wall in the Big Bend region of the southwestern region of Texas including in Big Bend National Park. Justice Jackson would have denied the application for stay.

== See also ==
- Shadow docket
- Certiorari before judgment
