= Death of Pierre Damas Bel =

2026 death of a Haitian college student

- Pierre Damas Bel
- Location: Springfield, OH

Pierre Damas Bel (March 14, 2006 – August 31, 2026) was a Haitian student at Wright State University in Ohio who died by suicide after walking into traffic on Interstate 70 in Springfield. About a month earlier, after his temporary protected status ended, U.S. Immigration and Customs Enforcement had fitted him with an electronic ankle monitor; his family said the monitor led to bullying at school. His death drew national coverage. Homeland Security Secretary Markwayne Mullin said the department bore no responsibility. His funeral was attended by Governor Mike DeWine and it drew national coverage.

== Death ==
Bel travelled to the United States to reunite with his parents in 2024, entering through CBP One mobile app established by the Biden administration for immigrants to enter the country at a port of entry and request asylum. His family was granted temporary protected status, purchased a home in Springfield, and in May 2026 graduated from high school with honors and as a member of the Junior Reserve Officer Training Corps (JROTC).

He had temporary protected status (TPS) and a pending asylum claim, but lost his status after the Supreme Court allowed the Trump administration to proceed with canceling the status for Haitian recipients. In July he was summoned to an Immigration and Customs Enforcement office, where agents placed an electronic monitoring device on his ankle.

On August 31, 2026, before 8:45 a.m., Bel parked on the shoulder of Interstate 70 in Springfield, Ohio, got out of his vehicle and walked into westbound traffic, getting hit by a tractor-trailer. He was pronounced dead at the scene, being 20 years old at the time. A death certificate completed on October 16, 2026, lists his death as a suicide.

After his death, his father said in a written statement: “He felt like he was treated like an animal.”

== Reactions ==
Protest in the wake of the death of Pierre Damas Bel in Ohio.

Homeland Security Secretary Markwayne Mullin said the department bore no responsibility for Bel's death, stating: "It breaks my heart for the parents. But we were following our procedures; we did our job. What happened when he went home ... he wasn't in our custody. We're not responsible for that." Mullin also said TPS "was never designed to be permanent."

Governor Mike DeWine called Bel's death "a horrible, horrible tragedy" but did not call for changes to ICE's ankle-monitoring practices.

=== Community response ===
On September 2, 2026, the Council on American-Islamic Relations' Ohio chapter (CAIR-Ohio) and local faith and community leaders held a vigil for Bel at Columbus City Hall, drawing state legislators, coworkers of Bel from Springfield, and supporters of the city's Haitian community.

Haitian Bridge Alliance and the Springfield-based Haitian Support Center issued a joint statement on September 1 calling for the U.S. Senate to act on legislation restoring Haiti's TPS designation and for "full accountability" from the Trump administration over the consequences of its immigration policies.

Ohio Immigrant Alliance, which had run an "Unshackle Springfield" assistance effort for Haitian residents fitted with ankle monitors, published a tribute to Bel and its executive director, Lynn Tramonte, called on Governor DeWine, Senators Moreno and Husted, Springfield's mayor, police chief, and county sheriff to act against continued ICE operations in the city. The organization held a candlelight memorial for Bel in Springfield on September 8.

=== Funeral ===
External videos
- Pierre Damas Bel Homegoing Service 10/03/2026

Bel's funeral was held in Springfield on October 2, 2026. His family opened the service to the media, which PBS NewsHour compared to the decision of Emmett Till's mother, and speakers described his death as the result of a racialized immigration system. Governor Mike DeWine and his wife, Fran DeWine, attended to offer condolences to Bel's parents; DeWine connected the visit to the death of his own daughter, Becky. According to PBS NewsHour, DeWine said the policy was wrong for people like Bel. The same day, about 25 miles (40 km) away, President Donald Trump held a campaign rally in Vandalia, Ohio, where he blamed Democrats for "dumping" migrants into Springfield.

== Personal life ==
Bel was the eldest of three siblings. His family fled Haiti and travelled to the US in 2021. He had temporary protected status, a form of temporary immigration relief in the United States for nationals of countries affected by armed conflict, environmental disaster, or other extraordinary conditions that prevent their safe return.
