= Deportation of Neri Alvarado Borges =

2025 US extrajudicial deportation

A colored ribbon closely resembling Borges' tattoo dedicated to his austic brother that allegedly proved connection to organized crime.

In February 2025, Neri José Alvarado Borges, a Venezuelan asylum seeker in the United States residing and working in Lewisville, Texas, was illegally detained and later deported to the Terrorism Confinement Center maximum security prison in El Salvador without trial by the United States Immigration and Customs Enforcement. He was arrested over an Autism Awareness tattoo dedicated to his brother, that ICE agents claimed proved connection the Tren de Aragua gang. His fate is one of many.

== Borges ==
Borges was born in 2000. He was studying psychology in Venezuela. Given the economic situation of Venezuela worsening, he wanted to find a way to support his family. In 2024, he traveled on foot to the US and crossed the border in Texas legally using the CBP app. He was given Temporary Protected Status and a work permit while awaiting his asylum hearing.

In honour of his 15-year-old brother to whom he is "deeply devoted" to, he had a tattoo of an autism awareness ribbon. At one point, he gave swimming lessons to children with developmental disabilities.

Borges worked at a friend's bakery in Lewisville, Texas.

== Arrest ==
In early February, Borges was stopped by ICE agents at his apartment complex, and brought in for questioning. The next day, his boss, came to visit Borges in immigration detention to check on him. Borges recounted how ICE agents had told him he was being arrested because of his tattoos and that they were “finding and questioning everyone who has tattoos".

He agreed to an ICE agent browsing his phone for any evidence of gang activity and after explaining his tattoo's meaning, the ICE agent told him was cleared of gang suspicion. For unclear reasons however, he was kept in detention.

The Dallas County Sheriff's Office told NBC Dallas Fort-Worth that there were no records of Borges being charged with any crime in the area.

While in detention, he told his boss that there were more than 90 people arrested in the same camp for the same reason - for having tattoos. Both Borges and his boss assumed, he would be deported back to his home country of Venezuela.

On 20 March 2025, CBS News published a list it had obtained of 238 Venezuelans that were being held at the maximum security Terrorism Confinement Center (CECOT) in El Salvador, a prison with human rights concerns. Borges's name is on the list, which was how his family and friends learned about his whereabouts.

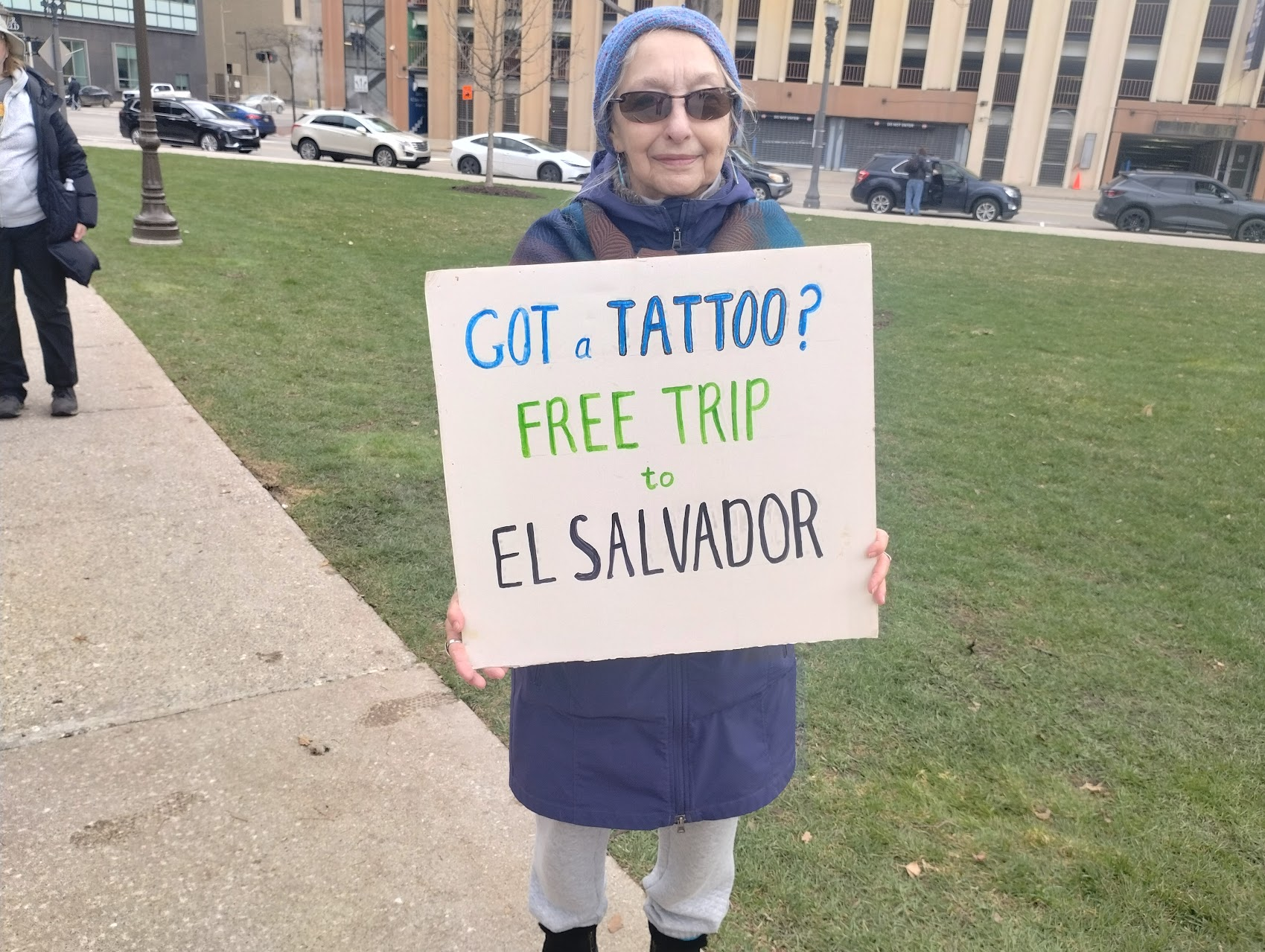
A protester

== Rationale ==
The Trump administration has repeatedly denied instructing ICE to target individuals solely based on tattoos. However this claim has been disputed as numerous similar cases are recorded and internal documents prove reliance on vague tattoos and social media posts to justify deportations.

An investigation from Bloomberg, focused on the 238 Venezuelans who were deported, found that approximately 90% had no criminal record, and that of the remaining men, several had only been charged with traffic or immigration violations.
