= Ahilan Arulanantham =

American immigration lawyer

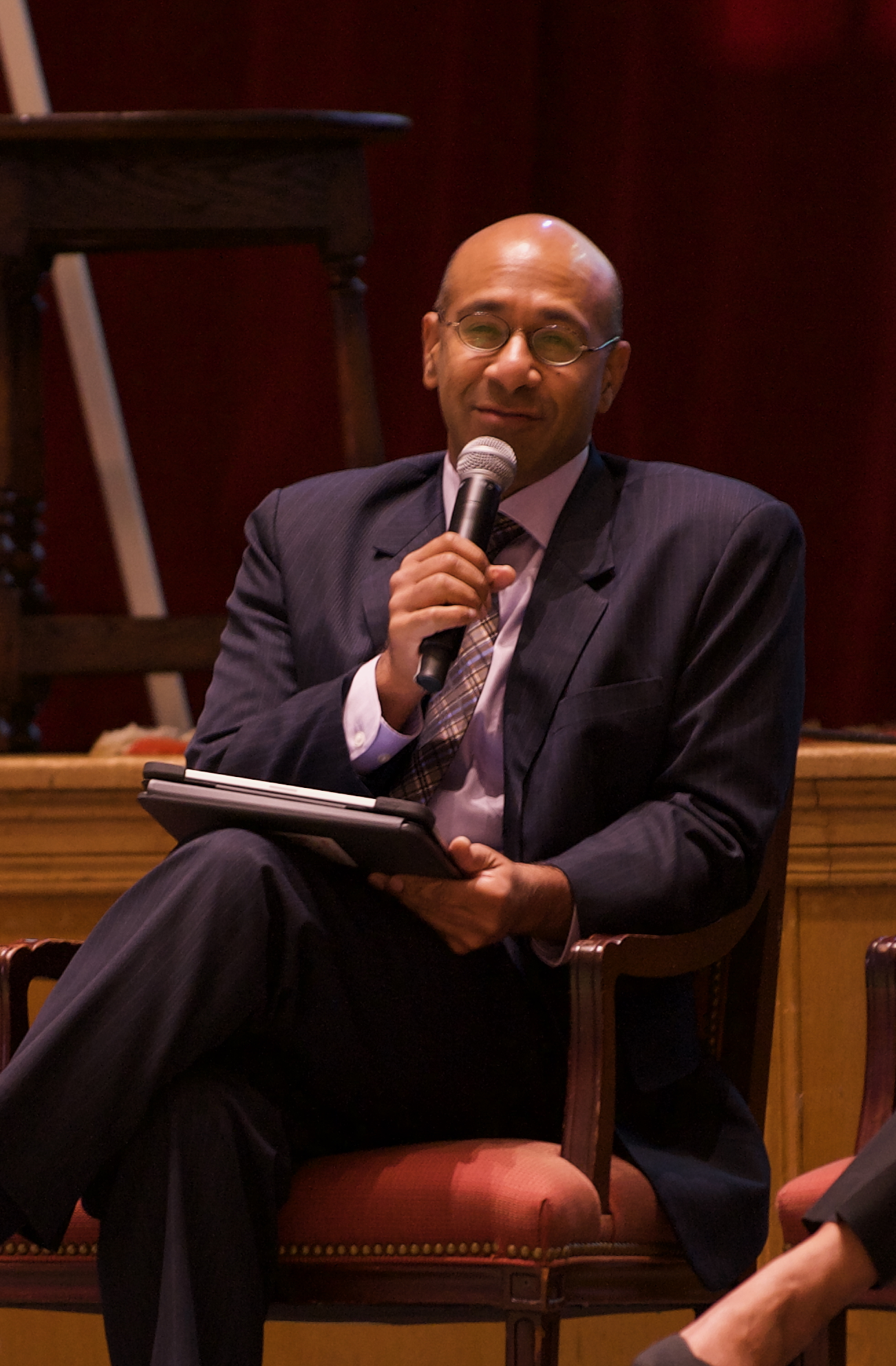
- Arulanantham speaking at the Knight First Amendment Institute in 2024
- Occupation: Lawyer
- Awards: MacArthur Fellowship

Ahilan Arulanantham is an American human rights lawyer. He specializes in immigrants' rights, particularly the rights of people facing deportation from the United States. He has been Senior Counsel and Director of Advocacy/Legal Director for the American Civil Liberties Union of Southern California, and has also been a lecturer at the University of Chicago and University of California, Irvine law schools. Arulanantham is the recipient of a 2016 MacArthur Fellow (a "Genius Grant").

== Life and career ==
Arulanantham is the child of Sri Lankan Tamil immigrants. He grew up in Lancaster, California. Like many other members of the Sri Lankan Tamil community, most of Arulanantham's extended family fled Sri Lanka in the 1980s to escape war. Many of them came to live with his family in Southern California.

Arulanantham attended Georgetown University, where he completed a B.A. degree in 1994. In 1996, he graduated from Lincoln College, Oxford with a B.A. degree. He then attended Yale Law School, where he obtained a J.D. in 1999. He was a Marshall Scholar.

Arulnantham worked as a law clerk on the United States Court of Appeals for the Ninth Circuit for Stephen Reinhardt. He was also an Equal Justice Works Fellow at the American Civil Liberties Union Immigrants' Rights Project in New York. Then, he spent two years as an Assistant Federal Public Defender in El Paso, Texas, before joining the American Civil Liberties Union in Los Angeles.

As an attorney for the ACLU of Southern California, Arulanantham has been involved in several landmark cases that established rights for individuals facing deportation. In 2006, he was part of a group of attorneys that successfully challenged the United States government's practice of indefinite detentions in the case Nadarajah v Gonzales. Arulanantham was also involved in the class action suit Rodriguez v Robbins in 2013, in which the United States Court of Appeals for the Ninth Circuit established that immigrants in pending removal proceedings who had been detained for at least six months had a right to ask for a hearing where they could argue to be released on bond, which enabled hundreds of immigrants to seek to be released to the company of their families rather than being held in detention while they waited for their cases to be heard. This case was subsequently adjudicated by the United States Supreme Court in Jennings v. Rodriguez, and during that process Arulanantham argued the case twice before the Supreme Court. Arulanantham also led a group of attorneys in the case Franco-Gonzalez v Holder, which established the right of immigrants with mental disabilities to appointed counsel.

As an immigrants' rights specialist working as the Southern California legal director for the American Civil Liberties Union during the Presidency of Donald Trump, Arulanantham became substantially involved in litigation regarding the immigration policy of Donald Trump. Los Angeles magazine described him as being "on the front line for civil rights in the Trump era", for example for his work in Ramos v. Nielsen against attempts to end temporary protected status.

In addition to his work as a practicing lawyer, Arulanantham has also taught in law schools. He has been a lecturer at both the University of Chicago Law School and at the University of California, Irvine School of Law.

== Selected awards ==
In 2010, the American Immigration Lawyers Association gave Arulanantham the Arthur C. Helton Human Rights Award. In 2014, he and the rest of the litigation team in Franco-Gonzalez v Holder were given the Jack Wasserman Memorial Award, also by the American Immigration Lawyers Association. He has also been repeatedly listed by The Daily Journal among the "top 100 lawyers in California".

Arulanantham was named a 2016 MacArthur Fellow, for "leading advocacy and legal efforts to secure the right to due process for immigrants facing deportation and working to set new precedents for the constitutional rights of noncitizens."
