= National TPS Alliance v. Noem =

US federal court case regarding repeal of temporary protected status

- Court: Northern District of California
- Full case name: National TPS Alliance et al. v. Kristi Noem et al.
- Decided: Ongoing
- Docket nos.: 3:25-cv-01766 (N.D. Cal.); 25-2120 and 25-5724 (9th Cir.); 24A1059 and 25A326 (Supreme Court)

Court membership
- Judge sitting: Edward M. Chen

Keywords
- Temporary Protected Status; Administrative Procedure Act; 2023 Designation of Venezuela for Temporary Protected Status

National TPS Alliance v. Noem is an ongoing court case in the United States brought by 7 temporary protected status (TPS) recipients challenging the second Trump administration's actions to terminate TPS for Venezuelans and later amended to include Haitians. The TPS recipients are represented by the National TPS Alliance (an organization composed of TPS recipients and allies from across the country), the National Day Laborer Organizing Network (NDLON), the California branches of the American Civil Liberties Union, and staff at the UCLA Law Center for Immigration Law and Policy. The suit follows Ramos v. Nielsen, a case deliberated during the first Trump administration over the repeal of TPS designation for status holders from several nations.

In March 2025, District Judge Edward M. Chen ordered the administration's actions be postponed. In May 2025, the United States Supreme Court granted an application by the administration to stay Chen's March 2025 order and sent the case to the Ninth Circuit Court of Appeals via the shadow docket. In August 2025, the Ninth Circuit affirmed Chen's March 2025 order. In September 2025, Chen granted the TPS recipient's motion for summary judgment, which the Supreme Court again stayed in October 2025. In January 2026, the Ninth Circuit affirmed Chen's September 2025 ruling.

In March 2026, the Ninth Circuit declined to rehear the case en banc. On June 25, 2026, the US Supreme Court held, in Mullin v. Doe, that TPS bars judicial review.

== Background ==
=== First Trump administration (Jan 2021) ===
The first Trump administration was characterized by efforts to restrict additional and existing designations of temporary protected status to foreign nationals, despite those pursuits largely being blocked in the courts. Nevertheless, the president issued directives at the end of his presidency to protect migrants originating in Venezuela.

On January 19, 2021, President Donald Trump issued a Deferred Enforced Departure (DED) directive to the Attorney General and Secretary of Homeland Security to defer the deportation of migrants originating from Venezuela on account of the extraordinary nature of the circumstances presented in the country by the actions of Nicolas Maduro's administration. The directive began by stating that Maduro had "consistently violated the sovereign freedoms of the Venezuelan people.” The agencies were thus directed:

to take appropriate measures to defer for 18 months the removal of any national of Venezuela, or alien without nationality who last habitually resided in Venezuela, who is present in the United States as of January 20, 2021, except for aliens who:

1. have voluntarily returned to Venezuela or their country of last habitual residence outside the United States;
2. have not continuously resided in the United States since January 20, 2021;
3. are inadmissible under section 212(a)(3) of the Immigration and Nationality Act (INA) (8 U.S.C. 1182(a)(3)) or removable under section 237(a)(4) of the INA (8 U.S.C. 1227(a)(4));
4. who have been convicted of any felony or 2 or more misdemeanors committed in the United States, or who meet the criteria set forth in section 208(b)(2)(A) of the INA (8 U.S.C. 1158(b)(2)(A));
5. who were deported, excluded, or removed, prior to January 20, 2021;
6. who are subject to extradition;
7. whose presence in the United States the Secretary of Homeland Security has determined is not in the interest of the United States or presents a danger to public safety; or
8. whose presence in the United States the Secretary of State has reasonable grounds to believe would have potentially serious adverse foreign policy consequences for the United States.

The administration further directed that the latter agency open up pathways to employment for any individual who met these requirements. The following day, Joe Biden was inaugurated as the 46th President of the United States.

=== Biden administration (Jan 2021 – Jan 2025) ===
On March 9, 2021, the Biden administration directed DHS and Immigration and Customs Enforcement (ICE) to grant temporary protected status for 18 months to registrants from the Republic of Venezuela, deferring to the earlier judgement made by Trump's office on the country's political situation. It maintained the DED policy enacted by the previous administration, but offered a broader means of access to Venezuelan nationals by means of TPS. On April 22, the administration further extended employment authorization to F-1 student visa recipients "experiencing severe economic hardship as a direct result of the...humanitarian crisis in Venezuela."

In July 2022, the administration announced its plans to extend the TPS designation, leaving the DED order to lapse, effectively replacing it with the new policy. In August 2021, the administration extended the deadline for registration by new applicants from Venezuela, Syria, and Myanmar from September of that year to November 2022. On September 8, the administration issued a continuation of the TPS designation for another 18-month period, ending March 10, 2024.

In September 2023, then-DHS Secretary Alejandro Mayorkas announced the extension of TPS and work authorization to an additional 472,000 Venezuelans, as well as additional work authorizations, citing "increased instability and lack of safety due to the enduring humanitarian, security, political, and environmental conditions." It additionally expanded the designation to encompass any Venezuelan who arrived before July 31 of that year, lasting until September 2025. ICE continued, though, to carry out deportations of new arrivals from the country at the southern border during the same period.

On January 10, 2025, DHS announced the final continuation of TPS under the Biden administration. It would have maintained the order from April 2 on to October 2026 for roughly 600,000 Venezuelans, as well as 100,000 designees from Ukraine, more than 200,000 designees from El Salvador, and nearly 2,000 designees from Sudan. This order was rescinded almost immediately upon the beginning of the second Trump administration, with designation set to expire in April.

=== Second Trump administration (Jan 2025 – present) ===
On January 28, Secretary Noem announced the vacatur of the previous designation, reverting to the initial deadline set by the October 2023 designation. On February 1, 2025, the Department of Homeland Security announced its intention to seek the removal of Temporary protected status for roughly 350,000 Venezuelans who had been granted the charter under the Biden administration. On February 5, an order was published in the federal register. A suit was filed against the order on February 19. Termination was to go into effect in early April, but the order was blocked by Judge Edward M. Chen in the US Court for the Ninth District of California. TPS was revoked for Venezuelans in October and November of 2025.

== Lower Court ==
On February 19, 2025, the National TPS Alliance and its partners filed suit in federal court to challenge the department's efforts to remove the temporary status of roughly 600,000 Venezuelans: 350,000 whose designation would expire on April 7, and an additional 250,000 whose designation is set to expire in September. They filed preliminary motion the following day. In a press release, they claimed that the "explanation for her decision [was] irrational and riddled with legal errors." The case was assigned to District Judge for the Northern District of California Edward M. Chen.

=== Arguments ===
Information on deliberations can be found here.

==== Plaintiffs (National TPS Alliance et al.) ====
In their preliminary filing, plaintiffs claimed that the DHS under Noem had violated the Administrative Procedure Act, as well as the guidelines of the TPS statute itself, which prohibits the premature vacatur of previous administrations' designations. They further claimed that the administration's actions were driven by racial/ethnic animus.

Representatives have further argued that the actions thus far taken by the administration have caused irreparable harm to the claimants–notwithstanding others affected by the order and litigation process–through family separation, psychological trauma, and unwarranted social stigma.

==== Defendants (Noem et al.) ====
Noem's office has held that Biden's office did not have the authority to renew the 2023 designation, and thus its vacatur is justified, given the fact that the current administration believes the designation is no longer warranted. They and the Trump administration at large have also advanced claims challenged both in and by the court surrounding the presence of dangerous elements within the Venezuelan migrant population at large in the United States. This has included their allegation of the broadly-based membership of Venezuelan migrants in the Tren de Aragua gang, the subject of additional court proceedings. The administration has further argued that TPS status designations are not subject to judicial review.

=== Ruling ===
On March 31, Judge Chen granted the plaintiff's motion to allow time for status holders' designations to be reviewed and deliberated in court, finding that Noem did not have a legal right to vacate the 2023 designation prior to its expiration; even if she had, it was based in legal error, according to his argument siding with the plaintiffs' reasoning. Judge Chen stated he felt Noem's actions appeared to be "predicated on negative stereotypes casting class-wide aspersions on their [Venezuelans'] character," and that the policy appeared in part to be driven by unconstitutional animus. The court found that the vacatur would do irreparable harm to the families designated under the provision; it did not feel that Noem's office had provided sufficient explanation of the harm inherent to redesignating Venezuelans under temporary status, and that Noem's office itself had conceded that its intention was principally to revisit then-Secretary Mayorkas' renewal of the 2023 designation.

Defendants almost immediately filed a motion to stay the order by no later than 3 pm on April 4, given that the department's vacatur of TPS was set to take effect on the 7th. Though the motion to shorten the deadline was granted, the motion to stay was denied by the court. An emergency application was then filed by DHS in the Supreme Court, claiming that multiple rulings by judges had encroached on the department's authority. In the emergency filing, Solicitor General D. John Sauer argued that "The court’s order contravene[d] fundamental executive branch prerogatives," indefinitely delaying work in areas of policy that Congress had recognized to required "flexible, fast-paced, and discretionary" action.

== Supreme Court ==
In an unsigned order on May 19, the Supreme Court granted an emergency application filed by the administration to stay Judge Chen's earlier order. The initial application for the stay was forwarded by Justice Kagan. Individuals whose status was set to expire in April are now without substantial legal protection, and face the prospect of deportation. The decision did not affect the status of 250,000 Venezuelans whose status was set to expire in September; their status is not set for final determination by DHS until July 12, 2025. Nor does the decision affect Haitian status holders. The court offered a pathway to later challenges, though observers have noted that the language is unspecific. The case was sent down to the Ninth Circuit Court of Appeals for further deliberation.

=== Dissent ===
Ketanji Brown Jackson was the only Justice noted in dissent. The order was unsigned and did not include a concurrence.

== Implications and reactions ==
The case, along with several others, will set precedent in deciding the extent to which the Trump administration can manipulate or repeal existing executive policy on temporary status. Independent observers note that it is likely the Trump administration will take steps to deport previous status holders in the event that the case is ultimately decided in their favor. This has partly been performed by means of the Alien Enemies Act, the subject of further litigation, most pertinently in J.G.G. v. Trump.

Many outside actors have noted the critical role that Venezuelan asylum seekers and other TPS designees play in the US economy, and the dangers that lie therein for its functions in the event that large-scale deportation efforts against recent or existing temporary status holders are greenlit by the courts. They constitute a population of more than 1 million people, and fulfill functions that are otherwise shortly supplied in the US labor market. In 2021, status holders contributed more than $2 billion to the US economy, roughly a fifth of their total earnings. 94% of working-age designees are employed, comparable with the national average, and they play a substantial role in the economic health and diversity of their communities.

=== Reactions ===
==== Plaintiffs ====
Representatives for the plaintiffs noted their surprise after an emergency verdict was reached. In a statement following the ruling, the co-director for the UCLA Immigration Law Center surmised:

[Noem's Feb. 5 order] is the largest single action stripping any group of non-citizens of immigration status in modern US history. That the Supreme Court authorized it in a two-paragraph order with no reasoning is truly shocking.

==== Defendants ====
DHS reacted to the ruling in a tweet on X, in which they claimed that it represented "a win for the American people and the safety of our communities." They further advanced unsupported claims of broad-based arrivals of gang members on US soil under the Biden administration. A notice on the Temporary Protected Status page of the Immigration and Customs Enforcement website describes the court's ruling as "convincing" and showing the merits of the order; further, it claims Judge Chen's March ruling to have been an "erroneous error".

== See also ==
- Legal affairs of the second Donald Trump presidency
- Venezuelan refugee crisis
- Alien and Sedition Acts
- Tren de Aragua
- Temporary protected status
- Parole (United States immigration)
- Deportation in the second presidency of Donald Trump
- March 2025 American deportations of Venezuelans
