= Turtle Mountain Band of Chippewa Indians v. Howe =

Turtle Mountain v. Howe
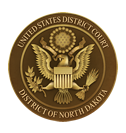
- Court: District of North Dakota
- Full case name: Turtle Mountain Band of Chippewa Indians v. Jaeger; Turtle Mountain Band of Chippewa Indians v. Howe
- Docket nos.: 3:22-cv-00022 (D.N.D.); 23-3655 (8th Cir.); 25A62 (Supreme Court)

Case history
- Appealed to: 8th Circuit
- Subsequent action: 8th Circuit's ruling stayed by Supreme Court via shadow docket

Turtle Mountain v. Howe is a United States court case regarding the ability of private parties (those other than the US government) to sue to enforce the Voting Rights Act.

== Background ==
Native American tribes filed a lawsuit represented by the Native American Rights Fund and the Campaign Legal Center against then North Dakota Secretary of State Alvin Jaeger alleging that North Dakota's redistricting violated Section 2 of the Voting Rights Act. The defendants moved to dismiss the suit, arguing that plaintiffs lacked standing because the Voting Rights Act does not contain a private right of action for violations of Section 2. The district court denied the defendants motion. On appeal, the 8th Circuit overturned the lower court's ruling holding that the Voting Rights Act does not contain a private right of action.

=== Other parties ===
In 2022, the United States Department of Justice filed a statement of interest "to explain its view that private parties can enforce Section 2 of the VRA".

Florida AG James Uthmeier, Georgia AG Chris Carr, Indiana AG Todd Rokita, Iowa AG Brenna Bird, Kansas AG Kris Kobach, Louisiana AG Liz Murrill, Mississippi AG Lynn Fitch, Missouri AG Andrew Bailey, Montana AG Austin Knudsen, Nebraska AG Mike Hilgers, South Carolina AG Alan Wilson, South Dakota AG Marty Jackley, Texas AG Ken Paxton, and West Virginia AG JB McCuskey submitted an amici curiae brief in opposition to the supreme court staying the 8th circuit's ruling.

== See also ==
- List of significant shadow docket decisions of the United States Supreme Court
- Democratic backsliding in the United States
  - Shelby County v. Holder
  - Louisiana v. Callais
