= Cuban-Haitian Entrants =

Status of some American non-citizens

Cuban-Haitian Entrants are Cuban and Haitian citizens living in the United States who qualify for certain benefits under US immigration law because of their immigration status and classification as "qualified non-citizens".

The classification was created during the Mariel boatlift in 1980. Historically, Cubans were eligible for certain immigration programs, but several of them expired in 2017.

Currently, the term Cuban-Haitian Entrant refers to benefits eligibility, and encompasses several different immigration statuses including parole and asylum pending. Cuban-Haitian Entrants are eligible for the same benefits as refugees, whereas most immigrants in the US are not.

Cubans and Haitians who came to the US under humanitarian parole under the Processes for Cubans, Haitians, Nicaraguans, and Venezuelans from 2023-2025 were generally eligible for mainstream benefits because of their status as Cuban-Haitian entrants.
