= Parole for Cubans, Haitians, Nicaraguans, and Venezuelans =

United States immigration program

Humanitarian Parole for Cubans, Haitians, Nicaraguans, and Venezuelans was a program under which citizens of these four countries, and their immediate family members, could be paroled into the United States for a period of up to two years if a person in the US agreed to financially support them. The program allowed a combined total of 30,000 people per month from the four countries to enter the US. The program was implemented in 2022 (Venezuela) to 2023 (Cuba, Haiti, and Nicaragua) in response to high numbers of migrants and asylum seekers from these countries crossing into the US at the southwest border with Mexico. Each of the four countries is facing political, social, and/or economic instability.

The CHNV Program is credited with greatly reducing numbers of people of these nationalities crossing into the US at the southwest border. After the implementation of Humanitarian Parole for Venezuelans, the number of Venezuelans encountered each week by the US Department of Homeland Security fell by over 90%. The US government promised to deport any person from these four countries who arrived to the US not through the program.

The CHNV Parole program was modeled after Uniting for Ukraine, which was implemented in response to large numbers of Ukrainians arriving at the US border with Mexico in 2022 as a result of the Ukrainian refugee crisis since the beginning of Russia's invasion of Ukraine on 24 February 2022.

The program was ended on January 20, 2025, through an executive order by President Donald Trump.

== Process ==
The first step is for a US-based sponsor to complete form I-134A online through a USCIS account. The form asks the sponsor to agree to financially support an individual ("beneficiary") for the term of their parole.

If the form I-134A is confirmed (approved), the beneficiary will submit attestations of eligibility, along with photos of their face and their passport, to U.S. Customs and Border Protection through the CBP One app. CBP completes additional vetting and if approved, will issue Travel Authorization. This gives the beneficiary 90 days to arrive in the US.

The beneficiary must travel by air. Upon arrival in the US, they may be paroled into the US for two years.

=== Unaccompanied children ===
Children must be accompanied by a parent or legal guardian.

=== In the United States ===
The beneficiary must complete a tuberculosis test within 90 days of arriving in the US. Beneficiaries may file a request for work authorization (I-765), which typically take several months to be approved. Unlike Ukrainian and Afghan parolees, CHNV parolees do not automatically get work authorization upon arrival in the US. A Social Security number can be requested as part of the work authorization form.

Beneficiaries of the CHNV program are typically not eligible for refugee benefits or services. Beneficiaries from Nicaragua and Venezuela are typically not eligible for any mainstream government benefits, such as healthcare (Medicaid), food assistance (SNAP), and cash assistance (TANF). However, in some states, children or people who are pregnant are eligible for Medicaid regardless of immigration status. Beneficiaries from Cuba and Haiti may be eligible for government benefits as a result of their status as Cuban-Haitian Entrants.

Beneficiaries may apply for asylum, family-based immigration, or another immigration pathway if they are eligible. Some beneficiaries from Venezuela may be eligible for Temporary Protected Status if they arrived before July 31, 2023. Cubans may adjust their status to apply for permanent residency after one year under the Cuban Adjustment Act. However, for many migrants, there is no pathway to stay in the US after the two-year parole period.

==== Texas v. DHS ====
Texas v. Department of Homeland Security
- Court: Southern District of Texas
- Docket nos.: 6:23-cv-00007

The Humanitarian Parole process is being challenged in court by Texas and 21 other states. A bench trial was held in Victoria, Texas, on August 24–25, 2023. Post-trial briefs and Proposed Findings of Fact/ Conclusions of Law were filed by both parties on September 29, 2023. Responses to post-trial briefs were filed on October 27, 2023. On March 8, 2024, Judge Tipton found that "Texas did not establish that it has suffered harm due to the CHNV parole programs and therefore did not have standing to bring its claims." The judge's ruling emphasized that the program has actually reduced the number of migrants coming from these four countries. Texas is appealing the decision.

An amicus brief in support of CHNV Parole was filed by attorneys general of New York and 14 other states and the District of Colombia.

=== Wait times ===
While initially some applications for sponsorship were being approved in a matter of days, wait times were typically many months to over a year. As of June 2024, a year and a half into the program, USCIS was still processing applications filed in January 2023, the first month of the program.

According to USCIS data, over 1.8 million sponsorship applications had been filed as of July 2023. With a limit of 30,000 people per month, this represents five years' worth of applications.

USCIS selects half the monthly cases to process on a "first in first out" basis, and the other half are selected randomly.

== Scope of the program ==
By the end of August 2024, about 530,000 migrants had entered the US; of these about 214,000 persons were from Haiti, 117,000 from Venezuela, 111,000 from Cuba, and 96,000 from Nicaragua.

== Pause and end of program ==
Noem v. Doe
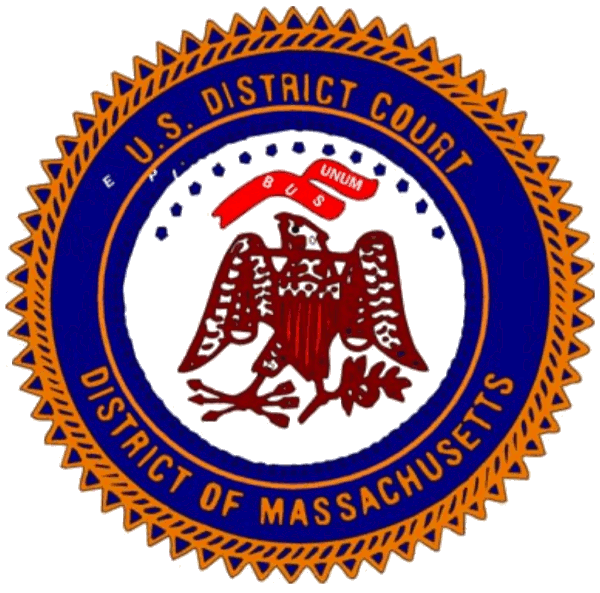
- Court: District of Massachusetts
- Started: February 28, 2025
- Docket nos.: 1:25-cv-10495 (D. Mass.); 25-1384 (1st Cir.); 24A1079 (SCOTUS)

Case history
- Appealed to: First Circuit
- Subsequent action: district ruling stayed by supreme court via shadow docket

Court membership
- Judge sitting: Indira Talwani

In July 2024, the program was paused due to a fraud investigation. Some processing resumed on August 29, 2024, with additional security measures including fingerprinting of sponsors. Although CHNV parole resumed in name, it appears that no new travel authorizations were issued after the investigation, and the final months of the program only processed parole claims for those who were previously authorized to enter before August.

A retrospective Government Accountability Office analysis later showed that the expedited nature of the parole process had led to widespread fraud. Over 3,000 instances of fraudulent passports were located on CHNV and Uniting for Ukraine supporter applications; one used a photo of reporter Connie Chung, and another used actor Cote de Pablo. One application was full of fraudulent information including the Social Security number of deceased singer Elvis Presley. Prior to the August 2024 investigation, USCIS had been given no way to check for fraud during the CHNV process.

On January 20, 2025, Donald Trump signed Executive Order 14165 which orders "action to: (...) Terminate all categorical parole programs that are contrary to the policies of the United States established in my Executive Orders, including the program known as the "Processes for Cubans, Haitians, Nicaraguans, and Venezuelans."". In March 2025, a notice in the Federal Register stated that DHS was terminating the program.

On April 9, 2025, U.S. District Judge Indira Talwani indicated that she will "stay revocation of parole" for those currently in the program. On 30 May 2025, Talwani's preliminary injunction was lifted by the Supreme Court. As a result, parole granted under the CHNV parole programs and work authorizations were revoked. Haitians and Venezuelans were able to convert their parole to temporary protected status until the 2026 ruling Mullin v. Doe.
