= Case bond =

A case bond is an investment in a legal claim. More specifically, it is a non-recourse purchase of an assignment interest in a legal cause of action. A case bond provides a litigant with money prior to a monetary recovery. In return, the case bond accrues fees until there is a recovery which triggers the satisfaction of the assignment interest. If there is no recovery in the underlying claim or lawsuit the case bond self terminates and the obligation to satisfy its terms expire. Typically, case bonds are used by litigants to cover the costs of daily living expenses, medical bills and litigation costs.

This investment vehicle was first developed in the late 1990s due to the need for funding to claimants in lawsuits prior to a recovery due to the extended lengths of time involved with litigation. A case bond is a type of structured investment product; it varies in size based on the anticipated value of a potential resolution in a pending lawsuit or claim securitized solely by any proceeds recovered.

== History ==
Historically, a third party investing in a lawsuit was a problem. In the Common law of England, the practice of financing lawsuits was connected with champerty and maintenance, which was a practice whereby the investor would become involved in the lawsuit. Lawsuits were won through intimidation and other methods rather than the merit of the case.

English common law was incorporated into the statutes of many states, thus the states inherited the rules prohibiting this practice. However, the definition of Champerty and/or Maintenance differs between states. In many states, it is no longer part of the law, in favor of existing laws regarding legal fees and recognizing existing laws regarding investment and financing in general. It is also important to note that in some instances, the retraction of these laws was due to the belief that the modern judicial system is not susceptible to the pressures exerted on medieval English judges. The original laws stemmed from the fact that the third party would or could interfere with the justice system.

In a case bond, the third party does not get involved with the lawsuit at all. The purpose of the investor in a case bond is to allow the plaintiff to continue life without the requirement of a settlement due solely to a lack of funds (which is often the case). Historically in the US, the plaintiff has often been "caught" in a lawsuit that could be won or settled for a large figure, but simply cannot support him/herself long enough to see the lawsuit through to its end. In many cases a defendant has been aware of this situation and has relied upon it to coerce the plaintiff to settle for a much lower figure than would otherwise be possible.

With the present system of case bonds, there is a lack of "urgency" for the plaintiff to settle out of court for lower amounts than those they would owe based on the amount of the case bond already in force. For example: if a plaintiff were required to pay $10,000 to the case bond investor based on the contractual case bond amount, settling for less than $10,000 would not be possible. This creates a problem for the defendant and possibly even for the plaintiff's attorney if they are considering settling for a lower amount. So, the purpose of the case bond is to reduce the "urgency" or "need" of the plaintiff to settle for a lower amount.

== Disambiguity ==
=== Lawsuit venture capitalism ===
Lawsuit venture capitalism is different from a case bond in that it occurs before the lawsuit begins. It is arguable that in many cases the lawsuit would not have been filed without the introduction of the 3rd party. A case bond requires that a case already be filed and "underway".

=== Litigation funding ===
Litigation funding is different from a case bond in that it is primarily used for support of the lawsuit itself, or related items such as expert fees and court fees. A case bond is only linked to the case by the simple nature of the possibility of payout at the end, should the case be successful. while litigation funding may or may not be dependent upon the outcome and may involve fee recovery being attached. Litigation funding may also be required in a case where a contingency fee-based attorney is not available.

=== Legal finance ===
Legal finance is the category in which a case bond will be found. A case bond is one distinct type of legal finance or legal funding.

=== Champerty and maintenance ===
Maintenance "...is directed against those who, for an improper motive, often described as wanton or officious intermeddling, become involved with disputes (litigation) of others in which the maintainer has no interest whatsoever and where the assistance he or she renders to one or the other parties is without justification or excuse."

Champerty "...is an egregious form of maintenance in which there is the added element that the maintainer shares in the profits of the litigation. Importantly, without maintenance there can be no champerty."

Unlike the above, a case bond is merely supplied, with no involvement on the part of the investor(s) in the bond (therefore there is no meddling).
