= Mullin v. Doe =

2026 U.S. Supreme Court case on Temporary Protected Status

- Supreme Court of the United States

Argued April 29, 2026 Decided June 25, 2026
- Full case name: Mullin, Secretary of Homeland Security, et al. v. Doe et al.; Trump, President of the United States, et al. v. Miot et al.
- Docket nos.: 25-1083; 25-1084
- Citations: 609 U.S. ___ (more)

Holding
- The Temporary Protected Status statute, 8 U.S.C. § 1254a, bars judicial review of non-constitutional claims challenging the designation or termination of a country's TPS. The Miot respondents' equal protection claim that Haiti's TPS designation was terminated because of race is unlikely to succeed, and they are therefore not entitled to interim relief.

Court membership
- Chief Justice John Roberts Associate Justices Clarence Thomas · Samuel Alito; Sonia Sotomayor · Elena Kagan; Neil Gorsuch · Brett Kavanaugh; Amy Coney Barrett · Ketanji Brown Jackson

Case opinions
- Majority: Alito (except as to Part III–A), joined by Roberts, Thomas, Kavanaugh, Gorsuch, Barrett
- Plurality: Alito (Part III–A), joined by Roberts, Thomas, Kavanaugh
- Concurrence: Thomas
- Dissent: Kagan, joined by Sotomayor, Jackson

Laws applied
- 8 U.S.C. § 1254a; U.S. Const. amend. V

Mullin v. Doe, consolidated with Trump v. Miot, 609 U.S. ___ (2026), is a landmark United States Supreme Court case in which the Court held that the temporary protected status (TPS) statute bars judicial review of non-constitutional claims challenging the second Trump administration's termination of TPS for Haitian and Syrian nationals. In a 6–3 decision issued on June 25, 2026, the Court ruled along ideological lines, clearing the way for the Department of Homeland Security (DHS) to end protections for roughly 350,000 Haitians and 6,000 Syrians.

Justice Samuel Alito wrote for the majority, holding that the statutory provision barring "judicial review of any determination" related to a TPS designation was "clear" and "very broad". Justice Elena Kagan, joined by Justices Sonia Sotomayor and Ketanji Brown Jackson, dissented. Because the ruling held that courts cannot review most TPS terminations, commentators noted it placed at risk protections for the nearly 1.3 million people from 17 countries then enrolled in the program.

== Background ==
Congress created temporary protected status (TPS) in 1900 to protect immigrants from deportation to countries that had suffered disasters, were considered dangerous, or were in the midst of wars. The status allows residence without a pathway to citizenship, and it must be renewed every 18 months. Section 244 of the Immigration and Nationality Act (8 U.S.C. § 1254a), as added by the Immigration Act of 1990, serves as the modern statutory basis for TPS and states in subsection (b), paragraph (5), subparagraph (A) that:

(A) DESIGNATIONS.—There is no judicial review of any determination of the Attorney General with respect to the designation, or termination or extension of a designation, of a foreign state under this subsection.

Under the Biden Administration between 2021 and 2025, the number of people covered by TPS doubled. As of 2026, there were 1.3 million people living in the United States under TPS designations, many of whom had lived there for decades. Among those were 350,000 people from Haiti.

=== Doe v. Noem ===
Doe v. Noem
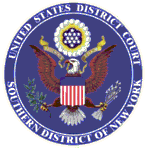
- Court: United States District Court for the Southern District of New York
- Started: October 20, 2025
- Docket nos.: 1:25-cv-08686 (S.D.N.Y.); 25-2995 (2nd Cir.)

Case history
- Appealed to: Second Circuit

Court membership
- Judge sitting: Katherine Polk Failla

In September 2025, Secretary of Homeland Security Kristi Noem announced the termination of TPS for Syrians. In October 2025, International Refugee Assistance Project filed Doe v. Noem challenging the termination.

=== Miot v. Trump ===
Miot v. Trump
- Court: United States District Court for the District of Columbia
- Started: July 30, 2025
- Docket nos.: 1:25-cv-02471 (D.D.C.); 26-5050 (D.C. Cir.)

Case history
- Appealed to: Court of Appeals for the District of Columbia Circuit

Court membership
- Judge sitting: Ana C. Reyes

In June 2025, Noem announced the termination of TPS for Haitians. In July 2025, Haitians seeking a class action filed Miot v. Trump, challenging the termination. In February 2026, Judge Ana C. Reyes blocked Noem and the DHS's termination order, stating that Noem did not have the authority to end the status and her arguments for ending it were flawed and racially motivated. The opinion quotes Trump previously denigrating Haitian immigrants by repeating the Springfield pet-eating hoax, and Noem calling them "leeches," "entitlement junkies," and "foreign invaders." After the D.C. Circuit declined to pause Reyes's ruling, the Supreme Court granted the government an emergency appeal.

== Supreme Court ==
On March 16, 2026, the Supreme Court granted certiorari before judgment and consolidated the two cases.

=== Oral arguments ===
On April 29, 2026, Solicitor General D. John Sauer argued for the Trump administration, Ahilan Arulanantham argued for Doe while Geoffrey Pipoly argued for Miot. During oral arguments, Justice Jackson asked "what was the point of Congress putting this statute into being and having requirements for the Secretary if there was no ability for anyone to challenge the Secretary's compliance?". Justice Sotomayor said, "What you basically are saying is that Congress wrote a statute for no purpose." The administration argued that the review process is "entrusted to the political branches" and that there is no judicial review of the administration's TPS review. Sauer said that "Respondents' attempts to carve out exceptions to the review bar would eviscerate it because virtually any substantive challenge could be recast as a procedural claim, as their own claims demonstrate."

Asked by Justice Barrett "if it's just kind of a box-checking exercise, I mean, why would Congress permit review of the procedural aspect when, really, what everybody cares about much more is the substance?", Arulanantham said "I think it's because Congress and us too and the millions of people who live with TPS holders have some faith in government, and they believe that if there is consultation, the decisions will be better." Justice Jackson said the procedural requirement is "not unusual" such as for the Administrative Procedure Act. Justice Sotomayor said, "this is a due process claim, we've never said what the final determination is important to due process".

Justices Sotomayor and Jackson referred to Village of Arlington Heights v. Metropolitan Housing Development Corp. (1977) regarding the racial views of Donald Trump, views that Justice Jackson said Judge Reyes found "illuminating". Jackson said, "we're not looking at this de novo." Sotomayor said to the administration, "not so long ago you came in and said that every executive officer has to be answerable to the President" and "Noem, said she was following the President's policy. (...) So I don't know how we can't attribute what the President had said his policy is when she herself says she's following it." Sauer said "It's the third time this sort of claim has been brought. The lower courts are enamored of these kinds of claims, but this is the third time this kind of claim has come before this Court. It's rejected it in Hawaii (2018), rejected it in Regents (2020), should be rejected again here." Justice Roberts said that Hawaii involved "entry restrictions (...) Here, we're concerned with (...) aliens that are already present. Your argument is a significant expansion of Trump versus Hawaii". Sauer said about Webster v. Doe (1988), "we don't argue that the judicial review bar extends to the constitutional claim."

Pipoly said, "It is the termination, not the determination, which is not subject to judicial review."

=== Decision ===
The Court issued its decision on June 25, 2026. In a 6–3 ruling split along ideological lines, it held that the TPS statute bars judicial review of non-constitutional claims and that the Haitian respondents were unlikely to succeed on their equal protection claim, reversing the lower courts that had postponed the terminations. Justice Samuel Alito delivered the opinion of the Court except as to Part III–A. Chief Justice John Roberts and Justices Clarence Thomas and Brett Kavanaugh joined in full; Justices Neil Gorsuch and Amy Coney Barrett joined except for Part III–A, making that portion a plurality.

Alito wrote that the statute allows "no judicial review of any determination ... with respect to the ... termination" of a TPS designation, and that "this text is clear, and its plain meaning is very broad." He reasoned that the word "determination" covered both an individual decision and the process leading to it, and that the phrase "with respect to" had a "broadening effect," so the bar reached "all of respondents' non-constitutional claims." Addressing the Haitian respondents' equal protection claim, Alito wrote that "none of the cited statements by either the President or the Secretary was overtly racial," and that the administration's record of terminating "every TPS designation that has come up for renewal" supplied "a strong, race-neutral explanation." He concluded that the respondents were "unlikely to prove that race was a motivating factor" and were not entitled to interim relief.

Justice Thomas filed a concurring opinion joining the majority "in full" but writing separately to argue that the equal protection claim was also "beyond the District Court's jurisdiction" and that "aliens have no equal protection rights against the Federal Government."

Justice Elena Kagan, joined by Justices Sotomayor and Jackson, dissented. She wrote that the evidence of animus included "statements by the President so repellent and racially inflected that the majority declines to put them in print," and reproduced several of them, including remarks invoking the Springfield pet-eating hoax and describing Haiti as a "shithole country." The statements, she wrote, "fairly shout, in their racial undertones and overtones alike, that race entered into the President's resolve to remove Haitians from this country." Kagan also argued that the judicial-review bar did not reach the procedural steps the Secretary was required to take before making a determination, and warned that "hundreds of thousands of lives will be uprooted, most permanently," while the underlying litigation continued.

== Reactions ==
The ruling cleared the way for DHS to terminate protections for approximately 350,000 Haitian and 6,000 Syrian TPS holders; according to the Congressional Research Service, nearly 1.3 million people from 17 countries were enrolled in TPS as of March 2025.

Derrick Johnson, president of the NAACP, called the decision "a devastating betrayal of Haitian families who have lived, worked, and contributed to this country for years — only to be cast out based on anti-Black immigration sentiment." Krish O'Mara Vignarajah, president of Global Refuge, said the Court "did not find that Haiti or Syria is safe" but rather that "the question is beyond the reach of judicial review." Guerline Jozef of the Haitian Bridge Alliance said the ruling "slammed the courthouse door on judicial review for most TPS terminations, but it did not erase the truth." New York Attorney General Letitia James called the decision "a betrayal of our values." Jessica Bansal, TPS counsel for the National Day Laborer Organizing Network, which represented plaintiffs in the case, said the ruling "allows the Trump administration to strip humanitarian protections from hundreds of thousands of immigrants, in blatant violation of laws enacted by Congress," and that "it is now up to Congress, and the people, to prevent the impending tragedy."

Republican officials praised the decision. Wisconsin Representative Tom Tiffany said, "Over 14 years later, we are finally putting the 'T' back in TPS." DHS General Counsel James Percival said the ruling was "a win for the rule of law and common sense," and a White House spokeswoman said TPS "was never intended to be a pathway to permanent status."

== Aftermath ==
=== End of Haiti's designation ===
After the decision, USCIS and the courts kept Haiti's TPS in place through a series of short extensions, first to July 10 and then to July 24. On July 22, the D.C. Circuit rejected the government's request to end the protections on July 24, writing that the case would return to the court on July 27.

USCIS announced that the designation was terminated effective July 27, 2026. It said that employment authorization documents in categories A12 and C19 issued to Haitian TPS holders were no longer valid, and that employers completing Form I-9 had to reverify those workers. Two days later, The Washington Post reported that DHS and the federal courts appeared to disagree about whether TPS had ended, because lawyers argued that it could not officially end until the lower courts carried out the Supreme Court's ruling.

On August 5, Judge Ana C. Reyes of the United States District Court for the District of Columbia issued an order stating that her February stay of the termination was "no longer in effect." She denied the government's request to halt discovery and asked the parties for a briefing schedule. Between 330,000 and 350,000 Haitians lost their TPS. DHS General Counsel James Percival disputed reports that the termination had not taken effect before Reyes's order. The plaintiffs' claim that the termination was motivated by racial animus remained pending before Reyes.

=== Enforcement in Springfield, Ohio ===
Springfield, Ohio, where Haitian residents number about 15,000 according to a local advocacy group, became a focus of enforcement after the termination. In August, U.S. Immigration and Customs Enforcement (ICE) began detaining Haitians in the city. The Haitian Community Help and Support Center said that 29 people had been detained as of Friday, August 21. Mayor Rob Rue confirmed the arrests and said ICE had indicated that targeted enforcement would continue across Ohio, adding that the city does not direct or control ICE activity. DHS also sent letters ordering many Haitian residents to report to ICE offices in Blue Ash or Westerville, and some were fitted with ankle monitors.

By the end of August, advocates counted more than 40 detainees, including two Haitian pastors. A Springfield pastor said the city was "under siege." On September 4, Homeland Security Secretary Markwayne Mullin said at a roundtable in Cincinnati that ICE had made 380 arrests in Springfield. He added, "We encourage everybody to go home." The figure was more than ten times the count the advocacy group had given two weeks earlier. Nonprofits and faith leaders in Springfield started a campaign called Unshackle Springfield, which calls on ICE to stop using ankle monitors.

=== Deportations to Haiti ===
In July, U.S. officials told the Haitian government to expect deportation flights after July 24, carrying about 250 people per week. The first deportation flight to Haiti since TPS ended left Alexandria, Louisiana, on August 20 with 161 passengers and landed at Cap-Haïtien. Reports differed on whether any of them were former TPS holders. Further flights followed roughly weekly. A third consecutive flight on September 3 carried 101 people and brought the total to 319, and a fourth on September 10 carried 82 people, including children, for a total of 401.

As of a sixth flight from Miami on September 24, Haiti's National Office for Migration counted 529 people deported since TPS ended. Of the 39 people on that flight, 23 were former TPS holders and six had open asylum cases. The flights arrived amid a surge in kidnappings and gang violence in Haiti, and United Nations officials and Haitian rights advocates called for deportations to stop. The State Department maintains a "do not travel" advisory for Haiti.

== See also ==
- Commissioner v. Zuch
- Department of Agriculture v. Moreno
- Louisiana v. Callais
