= Temporary protected status =

Temporary status for eligible nationals who reside in the United States

Temporary protected status (TPS) is a form of temporary immigration relief in the United States for nationals of countries affected by armed conflict, environmental disaster, or other extraordinary conditions that prevent their safe return. Created by the Immigration Act of 1990, it is designated country by country by the Secretary of Homeland Security.

Eligible nationals already in the country may remain for a fixed period, usually 6 to 18 months and renewable, and in most cases receive work authorization. TPS does not by itself lead to permanent residence or citizenship. In March 2025, approximately 1,297,635 people held TPS.

In 2025 and 2026, the second Trump administration moved to end TPS for most of the countries designated when it took office, including Venezuela, Haiti, Honduras, Nicaragua, Nepal and Syria. In June 2026, in Mullin v. Doe, the Supreme Court ruled 6-3 that the TPS statute bars courts from hearing non-constitutional challenges to a termination, allowing the terminations for Haiti and Syria to proceed.

== History ==
2017-2025
As of	Number of people with TPS (approximate)
October 2017	436,866
November 2018	417,341
November 2019	411,326
March 2021	320,000
February 2022	354,625
November 2022	537,075
March 2023	610,630
September 2023	697,530
March 2024	863,880
September 2024	1,095,115
March 2025	1,297,635

In 1990, as part of the Immigration Act of 1990 ("IMMACT"), P.L. 101–649, Congress established a procedure by which the Attorney General may provide temporary protected status to immigrants in the United States who are temporarily unable to safely return to their home country because of ongoing armed conflict, an environmental disaster, or other extraordinary and temporary conditions.

On March 1, 2003, pursuant to the Homeland Security Act of 2002, Public Law 107–296, the former Immigration and Naturalization Services (INS) of the Department of Justice was divided into three different agencies under the Department of Homeland Security, namely U.S. Immigration and Customs Enforcement (ICE), United States Citizenship and Immigration Services (USCIS), and U.S. Customs and Border Protection (CBP). As of October 2017, the authority to designate a country for temporary protected status rests with the United States Secretary of Homeland Security.

TPS beneficiaries and those who are found preliminarily eligible for TPS upon initial review of their cases are not removable from the United States, can obtain employment authorization, with an Employment Authorization Document (EAD), and may be granted travel authorization via Form I-131, Application for Travel Document.

By 2017, the temporary protected status program covered people from ten countries, namely El Salvador, Haiti, Honduras, Liberia, Nepal, Nicaragua, Somalia, Sudan, Syria, and Yemen. By November 2017, about 300,000 foreign nationals were recipients of protection under temporary protected status.

Deferred Enforced Departure is a status similar to temporary protected status. It covers those who formerly had TPS from certain countries prior to its termination. It is active for Liberia through March 30, 2020 and covers those who had TPS as of the termination of the second most recent TPS designation of Liberian on September 30, 2007. Liberians covered by DED, as well as some Liberians not covered by DED, may be eligible for permanent resident status (a Green Card) under recently enacted legislation known as Liberian Refugee Immigration Fairness Act (LRIF).

The first Trump administration tried to end temporary protected status for certain individuals of certain nationalities, while advocacy groups recommended that people with temporary protected status be allowed to apply for permanent residency status.

The 2021 United States Supreme Court case Sanchez v. Mayorkas affirmed that temporary protected status only granted legal status to remain in the country and was not equivalent to lawful admission into the country. Thus, those immigrants that had entered the country unlawfully but had received temporarily protected status are ineligible to apply for permanent resident status simply through virtue of their temporary protected status.

As of March 2025 there were 1.2 million people eligible for or receiving TPS in the United States, and Venezuelans were the largest group.

President Trump issued Proclamation 10888, titled "Guaranteeing the States Protection Against Invasion", which mandated various actions. Executive Order 14165 terminated various programs. Paroled individuals are only to be admitted, or allowed to remain in the U.S., if they show an urgent humanitarian need or if they can contribute significantly to the United States. This change creates uncertainty as to whether individuals who would have previously been granted temporary status under one of the categorical parole programs, or who are currently in the United States under one of those programs, will now be able to come into or stay in the United States.

== Eligibility ==
Designation of a country's nationals for temporary protected status allows all of those country's nationals who are in the United States on the day of the designation to apply for temporary protected status. Anyone from that country who enters after that date is not eligible. When the status comes up for expiration, the Attorney General of the United States may choose to redesignate, allowing that country's nationals who have entered since the original designation to apply, or to extend, which merely allows the previous recipients to maintain their status until the new expiration date.

A person who is a national of a country, or a person having no nationality who last habitually resided in that country, designated for temporary protected status is eligible to apply for temporary protected status benefits if he or she:

- Establishes the necessary continuous physical presence and continuous residence in the United States as specified by each designation;
- Is not subject to one of the criminal, security-related, or other bars to temporary protected status; and
- Applies for temporary protected status within the specified time period. If the Attorney General of the United States extends a temporary protected status designation beyond the initial designation period, the beneficiary must timely re-register to maintain his or her temporary protected status benefits under the temporary protected status program.

A person is not eligible for temporary protected status if he or she:

- Has been convicted of any felony or two or more misdemeanors committed in the United States;
- Is a person who ordered, incited, assisted, or otherwise participated in the persecution of any person on account of race, religion, nationality, membership in a particular social group, or political opinion, or is otherwise subject to one of the bars to asylum; or
- Is subject to one of several criminal-related or terrorism-related grounds of inadmissibility for which a waiver is not available.

Late initial registration is available for those who did not apply during the initial registration period of a country's temporary protected status designation. In addition to meeting all of the other requirements for temporary protected status in one's own right (residence, physical presence, etc.), a late initial registrant must establish eligibility to file late by showing that one or more of the late initial filing conditions existed during the initial registration period and also within 60 days of filing the late initial temporary protected status application. Children and spouses of temporary protected status-eligible individuals cannot derive continuous residence or continuous physical presence from their parents or spouses for late initial filings.

== Employment authorization ==
TPS applicants are eligible to receive an Employment Authorization Document (EAD) based on temporary protected status only if they have a pending or approved initial Form I-821 (application for temporary protected status). Category C19 appears on Employment Authorization Documents issued while the initial Form I-821 is pending approval or denial; therefore, receiving a C19 Employment Authorization Document does not mean that an applicant has been granted temporary protected status. Category A12 appears on Employment Authorization Documents issued after the initial Form I-821 has been approved.

During the period for which a country has been designated for TPS, beneficiaries may remain in the United States and may obtain work authorization. A person in temporary protected status is considered as being in "lawful status as a nonimmigrant". Temporary protected status does not provide a path to permanent resident status (green card) or United States citizenship.

TPSs is typically designated for between 6 and 18 months at a time for each country; once that time is up, the status expires and its beneficiaries revert to the same immigration status they maintained before TPS (unless that status had since expired). Accordingly, if an immigrant did not have lawful status prior to receiving temporary protected status and did not obtain any other lawful status during the designation of temporary protected status, the person reverts to unlawful status upon the expiration of that designation of temporary protected status. However, employment authorization documentation (EADs) and/or TPS approval notices that appear to contain expired validity dates on their face may be automatically extended without the need to file a new Form I-821 and/or Form I-765 per the most recent Federal Register Notices (FRNs) for each country.

== Denial or withdrawal of application ==
U.S. Citizenship and Immigration Services (USCIS) may withdraw TPS if the person was not originally eligible or is no longer eligible; if the person has left the U.S. without first receiving advance parole since status was granted; or if the person does not re-register within 30 days of the end each 12-month period of status, unless for good cause.

As long as the current designation of TPS for a registrant's country remains active, withdrawal of TPS must be by written notice to the person from USCIS.

Applicants are not eligible to file a re-registration of TPS application if their initial Form I-821 has been denied or if United States Citizenship and Immigration Services has withdrawn its prior approval of their TPS. The automatic validity extension of certain TPS documentation for countries covered by the injunctions/litigation (El Salvador, Nicaragua, Haiti, Sudan, Honduras, and Nepal) also does not apply for anyone whose TPS has been formally withdrawn by USCIS.

If temporary protected status has been denied or withdrawn, however, it is possible to file another initial Form I-821. USCIS will treat the new initial Form I-821 as a late initial registration application. The full initial application fees must be paid for all multiple initial Form I-821s, and in Part 1 of the new initial Form I-821, Box A must be selected.

If USCIS approves a subsequent initial Form I-821, the applicant's temporary protected status will be established or restored and she or he may thereafter file re-registration applications.

Alternatively, an applicant whose temporary protected status has been denied or withdrawn may follow the instructions provided in the Notice of Denial or Withdrawal for filing a Form I-290B (Notice of Appeal or Motion) or, if applicable, seeking de novo review of TPS eligibility before an Immigration Judge in deportation or exclusion proceedings.

== Injunctions ==
Section 302A of the Immigration Act of 1990 (later 8 U.S.C. § 1254a(b)(5)(A))) states:

There is no judicial review of any determination of the Attorney General with respect to the designation, or termination or extension of a designation, of a foreign state under this subsection.

The first Trump administration's announced decisions to terminate TPS for El Salvador, Nicaragua, Sudan, Haiti, Honduras, and Nepal were challenged in court. Between 2018 and 2020, partial decisions were made regarding Sudan, Nicaragua, Haiti, and El Salvador. Specifically:

On October 3, 2018, in Ramos, et al. v. Nielsen, et al., No. 18-cv-01554 (N.D. Cal. Oct. 3, 2018), the U.S. District Court for the Northern District of California enjoined DHS from implementing and enforcing the decisions to terminate TPS for Sudan, Nicaragua, Haiti and El Salvador. As of September 2020, the Ninth Circuit Court of Appeals made the decision to temporarily prohibited DHS from terminating any beneficiaries that are from the countries listed above. Given this decision, the beneficiaries should remain in the United States through December 31, 2022 which was acknowledged and upheld by DHS. In addition, DHS put out an official Federal Register Notice ("FRN") that stated the following documents will automatically extend through December 2022: Employment Authorization Documents (EAD), Form I-797, Notice of Action (also known as an Approval Notice), Form I-94, Arrival and Departure Record (other TPS eligibility documentation).

In 2019, TPS beneficiaries' statuses, from Honduras and Nepal, were threatened by DHS similarly to those of TPS beneficiaries from Nicaragua, Sudan, Haiti, and El Salvador. Because the cases were very alike, a judge from the US District Court for the Northern District of California decided to link this case to that of Ramos v. Nielsen. By doing so, DHS was in no position to terminate the beneficiaries status in the US until that was resolved. Now— because this the future of Honduras and Nepal beneficiaries depends on what happens to the beneficiaries of Haiti, El Salvador, Sudan, and Nicaragua; the final decision that will come in the future for Ramos v. Nielsen will determine what happens to the TPS beneficiaries of Haiti, Sudan, Nicaragua, El Salvador, Honduras, and Nepal.

In regards to Venezuela, Syria, and Burma (also known as Myanmar) being added as countries whose nationals are eligible to become beneficiaries of TPS, DHS has extended the initial registration period from 180 days to 18 months, as of August 2021. DHS is strictly enforcing that extensions nor submission of applications later that the given time period will not be considered and rejected.

The "Automatic Extension of EADs Issued Under the TPS Designations for El Salvador, Haiti, Honduras, Nepal, Nicaragua, and Sudan" and "Automatic Extension of Forms I-94 and Forms I-797" tables in the most recent Federal Register Notices (FRNs) for these countries state whether the validity of current TPS registrants' Employment Authorization Documents (EADs), TPS I-821 approval notices, and/or I-94s has been automatically extended without needing to file a new Form I-821 and/or Form I-765. The "Automatic Employment Authorization Document (EAD) Extension" section of each of U.S. Citizenship and Immigration Services (USCIS)'s country-specific TPS webpages also states which prior EAD, approval notice, and I-94 end validity dates have been automatically extended without the need to re-file as long as beneficiaries remain eligible for TPS and the injunctions isn't removed or updated on behalf of the court.

Those whose TPS documents have been automatically extended can show their existing documentation and a copy of the relevant FRN to employers and agencies as verification of their continuing TPS and employment authorization. Registrants whose EADs, I-821 approval notices, and/or I-94s have been automatically extended do not receive any notification of or documentation concerning the extension of validity other than the FRN itself.

=== Impact ===
Registrants who are poised to potentially lose TPS if it is terminated for their country and not continued based on an injunction have a number of options. Salvadoran official Roberto Lorenzana (Note: See "Roberto Lorenzana". Thirty-sixth session of ECLAC (Biography). May 5, 2016.) estimates that about half will be eligible to apply for permanent residence. Many are expected to stay in the United States illegally. However, those who do choose to stay in the United States illegally are expected to be much easier to deport than most undocumented immigrants because their home and workplace are known to the government through the application process for temporary protected status.

César Ríos of the Salvadoran Migrant Institute estimates that, at most, 15% of Salvadorans with temporary protected status will return to El Salvador if their status terminates. Some have considered moving to Canada. The government of El Salvador has been in conversation with the government of Qatar about some of those formerly under temporary protected status working in Qatar temporarily.

The United States has made an agreement with El Salvador to limit the number of deportation flights to eight a week, each with a maximum capacity of 135 people. This puts the maximum number of deportations at 56,000 Salvadorans a year. (Note: ICE typically utilizes only eight airplanes for deportation worldwide, at a cost of $8,410 per flight-hour in 2015.)

Business owners and local governments in the United States have expressed concern about the economic impact of possibly enforcing TPS terminations on industries which depend on workers in the United States under temporary protected status. Deportation is expected to cause disruption in El Salvador and increase illegal immigration from El Salvador to the United States.

A 2017 study by the Immigrant Legal Resource Center found that removing temporary protected status from Haitians, Salvadorans, and Hondurans would decrease Social Security and Medicare income by $6.9 billion, decrease Gross Domestic Product by $45.2 billion, and incur deportation costs of $3.1 billion over 10 years.

Concerns also exist that if TPS is terminated for large numbers of registrants who have now lived and worked in the United States for decades under the program, numerous United States citizen children who currently reside with and depend on their TPS registrant parents or guardians will be impacted.

On February 5, 2025, Secretary of Homeland Security Kristi Noem announced that the 2023 TPS designation for Venezuelan nationals would end on April 7, 2025, rather than the original end date of October 2, 2026. National TPS Alliance filed a lawsuit in order to prevent the termination of the 2023 TPS designation. A federal judge ordered the continuation of the TPS designation on March 31, 2025. On May 19, 2025, the Supreme Court allowed the federal government to terminate the 2023 TPS designation pending the federal government's appeal. On September 5, 2025, a federal court ordered the continuation of the 2023 TPS designation. On October 3, 2025, the Supreme Court allowed the termination of the 2023 TPS designation to be effective immediately.

On June 25, 2026, in Mullin v. Doe (consolidated with Trump v. Miot), the Supreme Court ruled 6–3 that the TPS statute bars judicial review of non-constitutional claims challenging a TPS termination, reversing lower courts that had postponed the terminations for Haiti and Syria. The decision cleared the way for the Department of Homeland Security to end protections for approximately 350,000 Haitians and 6,000 Syrians, and, because it held that courts cannot review most TPS determinations, was reported to place at risk protections for others among the roughly 1.3 million TPS holders from 17 countries.

== Nationals ==
March 2025
Country	Number of TPS approved people (approximate)
Afghanistan	8,105
Burma	3,670
Cameroon	4,920
El Salvador	170,125
Ethiopia	4,540
Haiti	330,735
Honduras	51,225
Lebanon	140
Nepal	7,160
Nicaragua	2,910
Somalia	705
South Sudan	210
Sudan	1,790
Syria	3,860
Ukraine	101,150
Venezuela (2021)	252,825
Venezuela (2023)	352,190
Yemen	1,380
Total	1,297,635

=== Countries under temporary protected status ===
- El Salvador — since March 9, 2001; in response to the January 2001 and February 2001 El Salvador earthquakes; extended through September 9, 2026; Salvadorans also had TPS in the 1990s.
- Lebanon — since July 26, 2024; in response to the Israel–Hezbollah conflict; designated through November 27, 2026. Previously designated March 1991 to March 1993 in response to the aftermath of the Lebanese Civil War.
- Sudan — since May 3, 2013; in response to the ongoing Sudanese conflict in South Kordofan and Blue Nile; ongoing as of October 18, 2026.
- Ukraine — since March 3, 2022; in response to Russo-Ukrainian War; ongoing as of October 18, 2026.

=== Countries formerly under temporary protected status ===
- Afghanistan: March 16, 2022 – July 14, 2025 in response to violence surrounding Taliban takeover and ISIS-K insurgency. (Note: CASA sued the federal government over the termination of temporary protected status for Afghanistan, saying the decision had been racially motivated and failed to follow a Congressionally required process. The Fourth U.S. Circuit Court of Appeals in Virginia temporarily extended the end date to July 21, 2025, while it considered a request for a longer postponement, but it later decided that there was "insufficient evidence to warrant the extraordinary remedy" of temporarily extending further while the lawsuit is pending.)
- Angola: March 29, 2000 – March 29, 2003; in response to the Angolan Civil War.
- Bosnia-Herzegovina: August 1992 – February 2001; in response to the Bosnian War.
- Burundi: November 4, 1997 – May 2, 2009; in response to the Burundian Civil War.
- Cameroon — April 15, 2022 – August 4, 2025; in response to Boko Haram insurgency and Anglophone Crisis.
- Ethiopia — December 12, 2022 – August 18, 2026 in response to both violence and the humanitarian crisis resulting in "severe food shortages, flooding, drought, and displacement.
- Guinea: November 21, 2014 – April 25, 2017; in response to the 2014 Ebola outbreak.
- Haiti — July 23, 2011 – July 27, 2026; in response to the 2010 Haiti earthquake. See Temporary protected status of Haitians in the United States.
- Honduras — January 5, 1999 – September 8, 2025; in response to Hurricane Mitch in November 1998. Though the termination order is under appeal, the court has allowed the protections to end during the process.
- Kosovo: June 1998 – December 2000; in response to the Kosovo War.
- Kuwait: March 1991 – March 1992; in response to Iraq's invasion of Kuwait.
- Liberia: November 21, 2014 – April 25, 2017; in response to the Ebola outbreak; a prior Liberian TPS designation terminated on September 30, 2007, and it is that older designation which renders TPS holders at that time eligible for Deferred Enforced Departure
- Montserrat: 1997 – February 2005; in response to the eruption of Soufrière Hills. (Note: Discontinued because no longer temporary as "volcanic eruptions are unlikely to cease in the foreseeable future".)
- Myanmar: May 25, 2021 – August 7, 2026 in response to the 2021 Myanmar coup d'état.
- Nepal — June 24, 2015 – August 5, 2025; in response to the conditions resulting from the devastating magnitude 7.8 April 2015 Nepal earthquake and the subsequent aftershocks. Though the termination order is under appeal, the court has allowed the protections to end during the process.
- Nicaragua — January 5, 1999 – September 8, 2025; in response to Hurricane Mitch in November 1998. Though the termination order is under appeal, the court has allowed the protections to end during the process.
- Rwanda: June 1995 – December 1997 in response to the Rwandan genocide.
- Sierra Leone: November 4, 1997 – May 3, 2004 in response to the Sierra Leone Civil War and November 21, 2014 – April 25, 2017 in response to an Ebola outbreak.
- Somalia — September 16, 1991 – August 14, 2026; in response to the ongoing Somali Civil War; a deadline of March 17, 2026 was temporarily stayed by a judge, but was ultimately lifted on August 14, 2026, which allowed the termination to go into effect.
- South Sudan — January 25, 2016 – August 7, 2026 in response to the ongoing South Sudanese Civil War.
- Syria — March 29, 2012 – July 20, 2026 in response to the ongoing Syrian Civil War.
- Venezuela — since March 9, 2021; due to socioeconomic and political crisis; extended through September 10, 2025 and terminated on November 7, 2025. One of two separate TPS designations for Venezuela, the other, since October 3, 2023, was terminated on April 7, 2025, though remained partially in effect due to the legal case National TPS Alliance, et al., v. Kristi Noem et al. until October 3, 2025 when the Supreme Court allowed its termination. Some beneficiaries, however, may maintain their status until October 2, 2026 due to a court order from the U.S. District Court for the Northern District of California.
- Yemen — September 3, 2015 – July 20, 2026 in response to the ongoing Yemeni Civil War.

== See also ==
- Deferred Enforced Departure – a similar U.S. status for eligible nationals of Liberia, Hong Kong, and Lebanon
- Temporary protection visa – Australian counterpart
- Temporary Protection Directive – European Union counterpart
