= CBP One =

Mobile app by US government

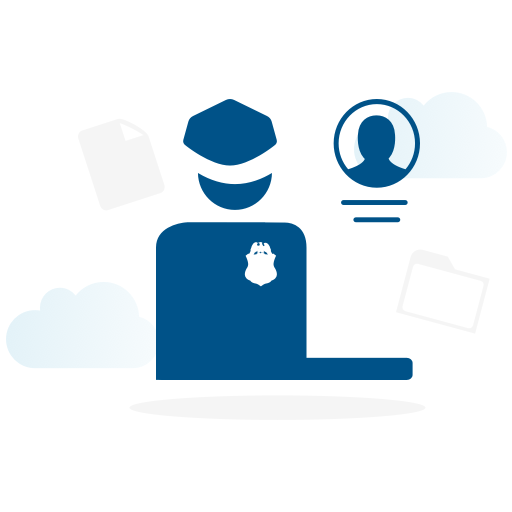
- Other names: CBP Home (since March 2025)
- Developer: U.S. Customs and Border Protection
- Release: 2020-10-28
- Operating system: Android, iOS
- Platform: Google Play, App Store
- Available in: English, Spanish, Russian, Portuguese, Haitian Creole
- Type: Government mobile app

CBP One, known as CBP Home since March 2025, is a mobile app developed by U.S. Customs and Border Protection (CBP).

Originally launched in October 2020 to help commercial trucking companies schedule cargo inspections, its functionality was expanded in 2023 to include migrants making asylum claims. The app faced criticism from Republicans who argued that it facilitated illegal immigration, allowing individuals to enter the U.S. before their asylum case claims were fully vetted.

The Trump administration shut down the app on January 20, 2025, and later relaunched it in March 2025 with a new purpose of assisting illegal immigrants in self-deportation, renaming it to "CBP Home".

CBP Home app launch announcement by Donald Trump

== History ==
CBP One was launched on October 28, 2020, primarily to help commercial trucking companies schedule cargo inspections.

In January 2023, CBP One's functionality was expanded to include migrants making asylum claims.

In May 2023, CBP One was designated by the Biden administration as the only path to request asylum on the Mexico–United States border and book asylum appointments. Nearly one million persons arranged screening appointments using the app—about 1,450 each day—since January 2023.

On January 20, 2025, shortly after being inaugurated, the Trump administration ended the use of the app. In addition to the app no longer being used, any existing appointments with the app were cancelled. Early morning 5:00 a.m. confirmed appointments on Inauguration Day were kept as scheduled, but by 1:00 p.m. the app notified asylum seekers that their appointment was cancelled. Some of those with cancelled appointments were part of a Mexican transportation program for persons with confirmed CBP appointments.

The app was relaunched in March 2025 as CBP Home to assist illegal immigrants in self-deportation from the United States. According to DHS secretary Kristi Noem, illegal immigrants who use the app and leave the country voluntarily may have the opportunity to return legally in the future, whereas those who are subject to removal would not have a chance at legal residency.

In October 2025, Pro Publica stated that some users of the app were not being provided with the travel documents, plane tickets, or financial aid they had been promised.

== Features ==
CBP One facilitated access to a range of CBP services. It became the mandated platform for migrants at the Mexico–United States border to schedule appointments for asylum processing at ports of entry. A class action lawsuit against the US government was filed by humanitarian organizations and those affected by the app. They argued the need for Internet access and a smartphone, as well as the limited language options, made it harder to file for asylum. In a 2024 report, Amnesty International described the app's selection process as a "lottery", with some waiting for over a year.

Additionally, it was the required application for Cubans, Haitians, Nicaraguans, and Venezuelans to submit biometric data necessary for travel authorization and parole under the Parole for Cubans, Haitians, Nicaraguans, and Venezuelans program. The collection of personal information was criticized by Amnesty International, adding that its facial recognition systems were unreliable for some demographics, and had a potential for discrimination.

CBP One required migrants to be located in central and northern Mexico for functionality. The app verified a user's location and blocked attempts to make appointments from outside authorized regions.

CBP One was available on Android and iOS in five languages: English, Spanish, Russian, Portuguese, and Haitian Creole.

CBP Home can be used to notify DHS of self-deportation, apply for I-94 departure forms, request luggage and cargo inspections, submit travel manifests, and check wait times for border crossings.
