= Virginia Christian =

Last female juvenile offender to be executed in the United States

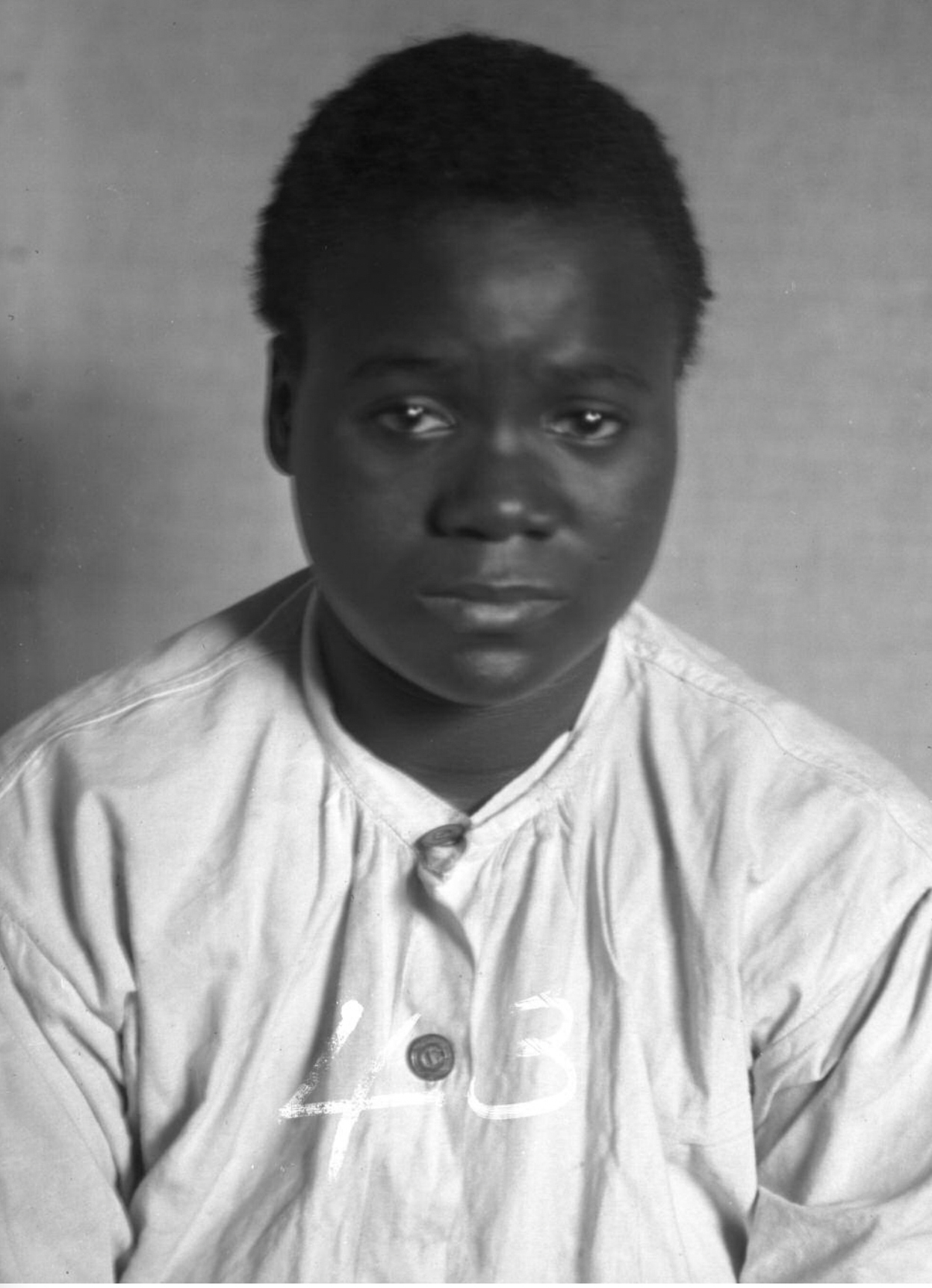
- Christian in 1912
- Born: August 15, 1895; Hampton City, Virginia, U.S.
- Died: August 16, 1912 (aged 17); Virginia State Penitentiary, Virginia, U.S.
- Resting place: First Baptist Church-Hampton Cemetery; Hampton City, Virginia, U.S.
- Other name: Gennie
- Known for: Last female juvenile offender to be executed in the United States
- Status: Executed by electrocution
- Motive: Argument
- Conviction: First degree murder
- Penalty: Death

Details
- Victims: Ida Belote, 51
- Date: March 18, 1912

Virginia Christian (August 15, 1895 – August 16, 1912) was an African American teenager executed by the state of Virginia. Convicted of first degree murder for killing her white employer Ida Belote, Christian became the last female juvenile offender to be executed in the United States and was the only such execution in the 20th century.

Virginia Christian left school at age 13 to work for Ida Belote. On March 18, 1912, when Christian was 16, Belote accused Christian of theft and attacked her. In response, Christian struck her with a broom handle and forced a towel down her throat, killing her. Christian was arrested and tried before an entirely white and male jury. Her lawyers, Joseph Thomas Newsome and George Washington Fields, argued that the killing was not premeditated, but the jury found her guilty of first degree murder after only 23 minutes of deliberation. Despite a Virginia law aimed at placing minors in reformatories for first-time offenses, Christian was sentenced to death.

Christian's case drew backlash from newspapers and civil rights advocates, who considered it unjust to execute an underage girl and believed her sentence was racist. Advocates also questioned whether Christian was mentally disabled. The National Association of Colored Women and National Association for the Advancement of Colored People petitioned Virginia governor William Hodges Mann to commute her sentence. The backlash was especially strong in Chicago, where newspaper editor E. Van Putnam led an aggressive campaign against her execution. Ultimately, Mann refused to pardon Christian; she was executed by electrocution on August 16, 1912.

== Early life ==
Virginia Christian was born on August 15, 1895. She was the third child and oldest daughter of Henry Christian and Charlotte Christian, who lived in Hampton, Virginia. Her father earned $1.25 per day working as a fisherman and performing odd jobs. When Virginia was 13, her mother became paralyzed and unable to work; to help support her family, Virginia dropped out of her classes at the Whittier Training School and began working as a laundress for a white woman named Ida Belote, earning $4 per week. Before marrying Henry, Charlotte Christian had worked for the Belotes, and Henry had sold them fish. Belote had a reputation for being difficult, temperamental, and sometimes abusive; Virginia's father and aunt both discouraged her from taking the job.

Some contemporary authors, including Victor Streib, Lynn Sametz, and David V. Baker, believe Christian was intellectually disabled. At the time, the Newport News Times-Herald wrote that "her intelligence is below average", the Hampton Monitor called her "crazy" and unaware of her actions, and the Richmond Times-Dispatch wrote that she "possesses little sensibility". Other reports described her as "dull". However, she likely never received a formal diagnosis.

== Killing of Ida Belote ==
On March 18, 1912, Ida Belote visited the Christian family's house and accused Virginia of stealing a skirt. Charlotte told Virginia to visit Belote's house and resolve the dispute. Once Virginia arrived, Belote also accused her of stealing a gold locket. Christian denied stealing anything and threatened to quit. In response, Belote attacked her with a spittoon. Christian responded by striking Belote's head with a broomstick, then forced a towel five inches down her throat, suffocating her. Christian later stated she and Belote both raced to grab separate broom handles, and that she put the towel in Belote's mouth to stop her from screaming. She fled with Belote's pocketbook, which contained $4 and a ring.

After the confrontation, Christian returned home to do chores. Two of Belote's children discovered her body, and the police reported seeing a trail of blood and overturned furniture in her house. One hour and 15 minutes after the killing, Virginia was arrested. She had no prior criminal record. In jail, without speaking to an attorney, she confessed to attacking Belote. However, she maintained that she acted in self-defense and had not meant to kill her. Dr. George Vanderslice, the county coroner, led a two-day inquest before a grand jury of six white men. After hearing testimony from two of Belote's daughters, the grand jury indicted Christian on March 20, 1912.

Belote's murder sparked tensions between the town's white and black residents, and Ida Belote's brother Lewter Hobbs discussed forming a lynch mob. Many black residents of Hampton, including Reverend John Gray, publicly denounced Christian.

== Trial ==
=== Background ===
In 1910, Virginia had passed a law shielding first-time offenders under the age of 17 from prison sentences; instead, underage offenders were to be placed in reformatories. However, the bill made exceptions for rape or when "the offense is aggravated, or the ends of justice demand otherwise". The state of Virginia did not have a dedicated reformatory for black girls, but sometimes transferred them to a reformatory in Baltimore. First degree murder carried a mandatory death sentence under state law at the time. The law was changed to make it discretionary several years after Christian's execution.

Under Virginia's revised 1902 constitution, only registered voters could be jurors in criminal trials, and first degree murder cases required jury verdicts. However, black men were systematically disenfranchised, and women did not gain the right to vote in Virginia until 1920. In 1904, Virginia codified an 1880 court decision that defendants had no legal right to a racially diverse jury. Accordingly, Christian's jury was made up of exclusively white men.

=== Proceedings ===
Christian's trial began on April 8, 1912. Her parents borrowed money to pay her legal fees, using their house as collateral. She was defended by two black lawyers: Joseph Thomas Newsome and George Washington Fields. The trial drew a large audience, which sat in separate sections of the courtroom segregated by race.

Six witnesses, including one of Belote's daughters, established Christian's presence near Belote's house on the morning of her death. The defense conceded that Christian killed Belote, but argued she acted out of passion, not malice, and therefore lacked the mens rea necessary for first degree murder. The prosecution argued that Christian wanted to rob Belote, and that the attack was the result of premeditated burglary, citing the money Christian took. The prosecution also argued that forcing the towel so far down Belote's throat required an instrument and would have taken minutes, which was sufficient to show premeditation. The defense called two expert witnesses to argue Belote did not die of asphyxiation. However, county coroner Dr. Vanderslice testified that asphyxiation was in fact the cause of death, and that Belote was unconscious when the towel was forced in her mouth. The police also claimed Christian had washed her hands in Belote's kitchen after killing her, suggesting she was not overcome with passion. Although Belote had a reputation for treating her employees poorly, Christian's lawyers did not leverage this during the trial.

The state argued that Christian was actually an adult, leaving the defense to prove she was underage. Virginia's father Henry Christian testified that she was born on February 22, but could not give her birth year. The defense introduced the Christian family Bible and Virginia's school records as evidence, which both established her birthday as August 15, 1895.

Christian asked to testify in her own defense, but her lawyers refused; Fields considered her "a coarse-mannered, homely girl and extremely ignorant", and he and Newsome worried she might cause a disturbance or alienate the jury. Both attorneys later regretted this decision, believing her testimony could have proven her lack of premeditation, offered support for an appeal, or prompted a new trial.

=== Verdict and appeal ===
On April 9, after 23 minutes of deliberation, the jury returned a verdict of guilty. Christian was sentenced to death by electrocution, with a scheduled execution date of June 21.

After the trial, Christian's lawyers submitted a writ of error to the Virginia Supreme Court of Appeals, arguing that the lower court violated state law by not sending Christian to a reformatory. On June 12, the Court of Appeals initially announced it would grant the writ, then revised its announcement and denied the appeal.

== Public reaction ==
After the trial, multiple groups petitioned William Hodges Mann, the governor of Virginia, for clemency, including the National Association of Colored Women (NACW) and the National Association for the Advancement of Colored People (NAACP). On July 24, Mary Church Terrell, the president of the NACW, met with Governor Mann alongside fellow activist Nellie Griswold Francis. She presented a petition signed by 300 members of the NACW and asked Mann to commute Christian's death sentence due to her young age. In response, Mann defended the court's decision and argued her age should not be a factor, since most criminals in the United States were young. Instead of a pardon, he granted a two week reprieve so that the NACW could hire private detectives to find new evidence. He also allowed Terrell to meet with Christian in jail.

On August 1, the NAWC wrote a letter to the NAACP about Christian's case. The NAACP established the Virginia Christian Litigation Fund, which raised $500 to research grounds for a new trial, and urged its members to write to Governor Mann. On August 5, a representative from the NAACP met with Mann to request a commutation, citing Christian's age and the unlikeliness that Belote's death was premeditated. However, Mann stated he believed Christian had premeditated the crime in order to steal Belote's money. Mann also incorrectly claimed Belote was 70 years old rather than 51. On August 14, attorney E. Griffith Dods also met with Mann on behalf of the NAACP. Finally, in September, W.E.B. Du Bois wrote an article in The Crisis about Christian's case.

The African American newspapers The Chicago Defender, The Cleveland Gazette, and The Washington Bee opposed Christian's execution. John Mitchell, editor of the Richmond Planet, called the crime "diabolical", but felt the state should show mercy to Christian since she was a woman. Charles Mears, a reporter for the Times-Herald who recorded Christian's original confession, wrote two letters to Governor Mann insisting that the crime was not premeditated. Mann also received letters from YWCA president Lucy Brooks Lewis, the Colored Young Women's Christian Association of Baltimore, and Virginia's mother Charlotte, who wrote:

My dear Mr. Governor, please forgive me for bothering you... I have been paralyzed for more than three years and I could not look after Gennie as I wants to. I know she done an awful wicked thing when she killed Miss Belote and I hear that the people at the penitentiary wants to kill her. But I am praying night and day on my knees to God that he will soften your heart. If you only save my child who is so little, God will bless you forever.

=== Reactions in Chicago ===
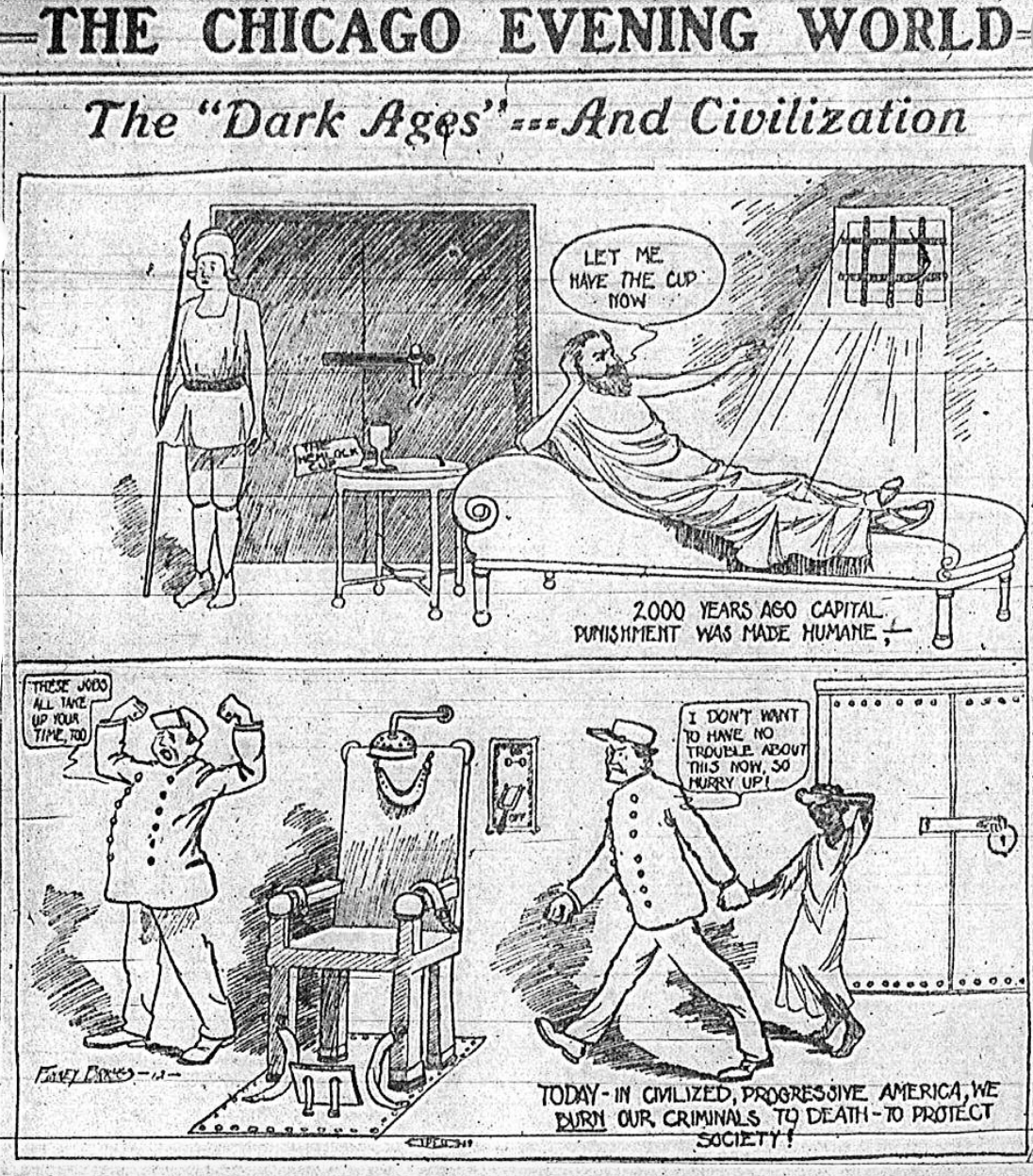
The Chicago Daily World opposed Christian's execution. In this political cartoon, the newspaper compared Christian to Socrates, arguing that Christian's execution was less humane.

E. Van Putnam, editor of The Chicago Daily World, (Note: The Chicago Daily World published two editions per day. The latter was called The Chicago Evening World.) and William Walling, an NAACP board member who wrote for the Daily World, aggressively campaigned against Christian's execution. The newspaper, which had the largest readership in Chicago, printed the NACW petition in full, called Christian's sentence "an indictment against society", condemned her conviction as racist, criticized the state of Virginia for executing women but not allowing them to vote, and urged readers to write Governor Mann. Putnam questioned Christian's competence and offered to pay for her to be mentally examined. In response, Mann insisted Christian was competent and sane, highlighting her ability to write letters. Mann also emphasized that the state had offered her an education, and claimed "I have not taken into consideration sex or color". The Daily World prominently advocated for Christian for two weeks, including seven days of front page coverage. Inspired by the paper's campaign, political and business leaders across Chicago criticized the sentence, including U.S. Congressman Martin B. Madden.

Other Chicago newspapers echoed the Daily World. The Chicago Examiner hired a lawyer to meet with Governor Mann. The Chicago Defender argued Christian's sentence should be reduced to life in prison, and claimed the state of Virginia was partially culpable for Belote's death, since it had denied Christian a proper education and social support. In response, the Richmond Times-Dispatch defended Christian's sentence, emphasized the brutality of Belote's death and the death penalty's role in deterring future crimes, and generally criticized the Chicago press.

== Execution ==
On August 13, 1912, Governor Mann announced he would no longer delay Christian's execution, which was to take place on August 16. On the 16th, Mann reiterated that he would not commute Christian's sentence and affirmed his belief that she was guilty of premeditated murder. Newspapers reported on Christian's stoicism leading up to her death. Before her execution, Christian wrote to her family and supporters:

I know that I am getting no more than I deserve. I am prepared to answer for my sins, and I believe that the Lord has forgiven me. I fear that Mrs. Belote may not have been Christian. I blame no one for my situation. I hope to meet Mrs. Belote in heaven. I thank all who have worked on my behalf.

Christian was electrocuted in the state prison in Richmond at 7:23 am on August 16, 1912, less than five months after Belote's death and one day after her 17th birthday. She received three electric shocks, although the Richmond Times-Dispatch reported she died after the first. Her death certificate was signed by prison surgeon Dr. Herbert Mann, the nephew of Governor Mann.

Christian was the first woman executed by electrocution in the South, the last female juvenile offender to be executed in the United States, and the only such execution in the 20th-century. Only two other girls younger than Christian would face execution in the 20th-century. In May 1944, 14-year-old Annie Mae Allison was condemned to death in North Carolina for her role in the murder of a cab driver, whom she had beaten with a brick. The sentence had been mandatory upon her conviction for first degree murder. However, on December 28, 1944, the day before the scheduled executions of Allison and two of her adult codefendants in 1944, Governor J. Melville Broughton commuted the now 15-year-old's sentence to life in prison, citing her age. The adult defendants, 18-year-old Ralph Thompson and 19-year-old Bessie Mae Williams, were executed the following day. In 1986, 16-year-old Paula Cooper was condemned to death in Indiana for the murder of Ruth Pelke, a 78-year-old Bible teacher whom she'd stabbed 33 times during a robbery, on May 14, 1985, when she was 15. Her sentence was reduced to 60 years by the Indiana Supreme Court in 1989.

== Aftermath ==
Christian was buried at the First Baptist Church cemetery in Hampton, although some newspapers incorrectly reported that her body went to a state medical school. Over 1,500 people attended her funeral. Despite widespread opposition to her execution, there were no riots or protests following her death.

At the time of Christian's death, there were no reformatories in the state of Virginia for black girls. In discussing her death sentence, The Crisis criticized the state of Virginia for not providing one. After Christian's execution, the Virginia State Federation of Colored Women’s Clubs established the first such reformatory, the Virginia Industrial School for Colored Girls, in 1915. Its first superintendent, Janie Porter Barrett, believed she could have saved Christian's life if the school had opened earlier.

In 2016, Ross Howell Jr. adapted Christian's story into the novel Forsaken.

== See also ==
- Capital punishment in Virginia
- List of people executed in Virginia (pre-1972)
- Capital punishment for juveniles in the United States
- Hannah Ocuish
- Mary (slave)
- George Stinney
- James Arcene
- Forsaken, a historical novel written about Christian
