= James A. Fields =

American commissary and politician (1844–1903)

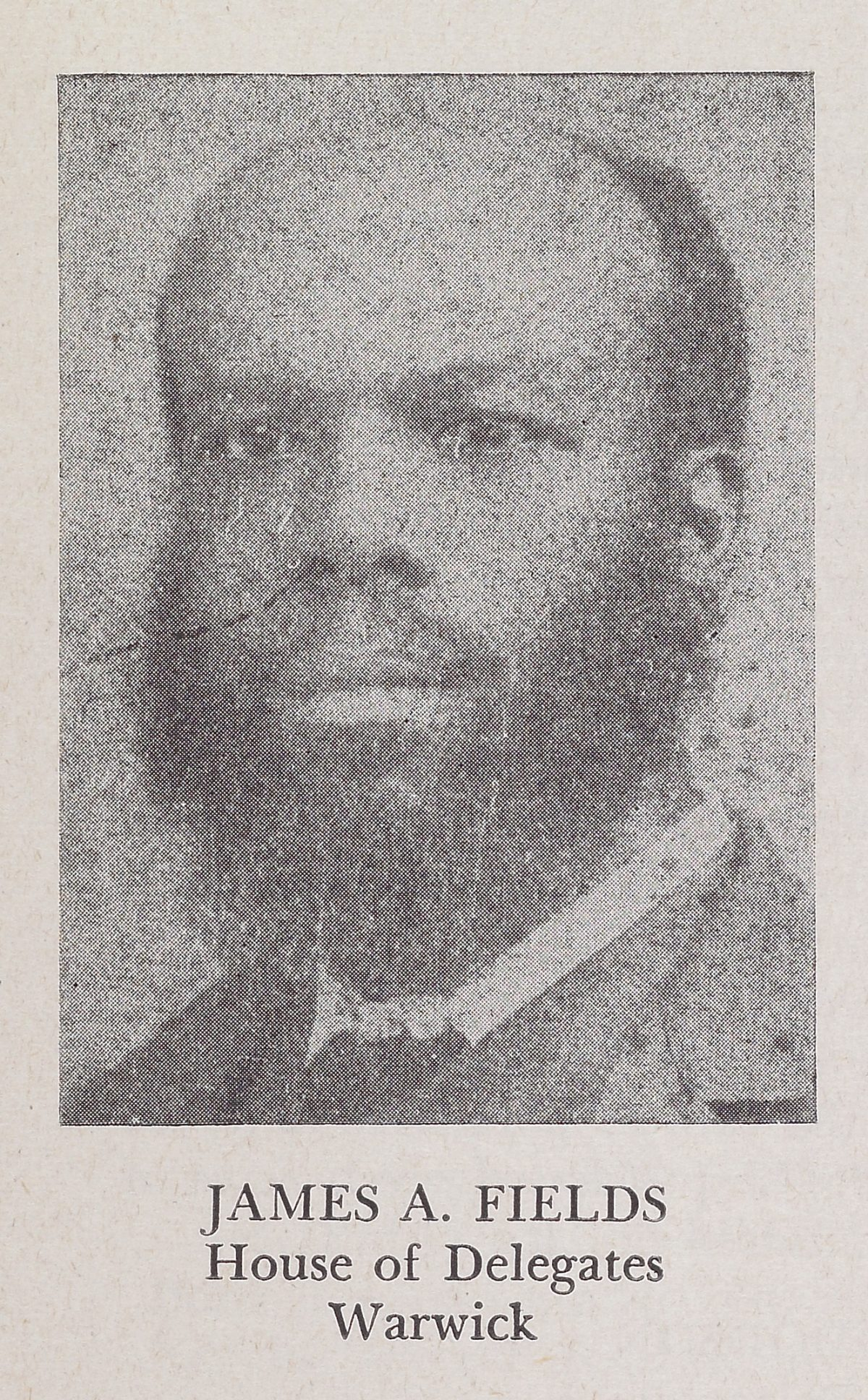

Member of the Virginia House of Delegates from Elizabeth City, James City, Warwick and York Counties and Williamsburg
- In office December 4, 1889 – December 1, 1891
- Preceded by: J.H. Robinson
- Succeeded by: John A. Crafford

Personal details
- Born: August 1844 Hanover County, Virginia
- Died: November 23, 1903 (aged 59) Newport News, Virginia
- Cause of death: Bright's disease
- Resting place: Pleasant Shade Cemetery, Newport News, Virginia
- Spouse: Carrie E. Armistead Washington
- Relations: George Washington Fields (brother)
- Children: four sons
- Parent(s): Washington Fields and Martha Ann Berkley
- Education: Hampton Normal and Agricultural Institute
- Alma mater: Howard University Law School
- Occupation: lawyer, politician, farmer, landowner

James Apostle Fields (August, 1844 – November 23, 1903), although born enslaved in Hanover County, Virginia, became a prominent lawyer, educator and landowner in Virginia's Hampton Roads area, including serving one term in the Virginia House of Delegates in 1889-1890.

== Early life and education ==
Born in slavery in Hanover County, Virginia in 1844 to Washington Fields and his wife Martha Ann (her surname given as Berkley or Thornton). One of his duties was to tend the horses of lawyers practicing in the Hanover County Courthouse.

== Civil War ==
Following a brutal beating, Fields escaped during the Civil War and by 1863 joined other family members who had resettled in the Hampton Roads area. He attended a school run by missionaries for African Americans, and by 1864 worked for the army’s Quartermaster Department at Fort Monroe. After the conflict, Fields was a watchman for the Freedmen's Bureau. In 1869, Fields was among the first students enrolled at the Hampton Normal and Agricultural Institute. While completing his own studies before graduating in 1871, Fields taught African-American children in nearby Williamsburg.

== Career ==
By 1873 and until 1886, Fields lived in Elizabeth City County. He became active in Republican Party politics and was a captain in the Libby Guards, a local militia unit in Hampton. He received a patronage post as the doorkeeper for the Virginia House of Delegates in Richmond for the 1879-1880 session. Meanwhile, Fields farmed as well as took courses at Howard University in Washington, D.C., graduating in 1882. Following graduation, he began a private legal practice in Hampton, and was a justice of the peace in either Elizabeth City County or nearby Warwick County. Voters elected Fields commonwealth attorney (prosecutor) for Warwick County in 1887.

Voters in the combined Hampton Roads communities of Elizabeth City, James City, Warwick and York Counties and the city of Williamsburg elected Fields to be their representative in the House of Delegates for 1889–90. He did not seek reelection, having accepted a position as school superintendent.

In addition to his legal practice, Fields taught students for 14 years in makeshift schools at Williamsburg’s First Baptist Church and at Hampton’s Third Baptist Church. He become a school superintendent in 1890. In 1893, as Newport News expanded due to the construction of a railroad line, Fields founded the first hospital serving Blacks in Newport News and Elizabeth City. By 1900, Fields owned (and paid taxes on) at least twenty-five properties in Newport News and Elizabeth City County.

== Personal life ==
On May 9, 1885, in Hampton, Fields married Carrie E. Armistead Washington, who bore four sons.

== Death and legacy ==
In 1903, Fields died of Bright's Disease and was buried in Newport News. In 2002 the James A. Fields House in Newport News, Virginia was included on the National Register of Historic Places. In 2021 Virginia approved a historical highway marker slated for Hanover County for the Fields family. James' brother George Washington Fields also became a lawyer. His niece Inez C. Fields was the third black woman to practice law in Virginia.

== See also ==
- List of first minority male lawyers and judges in Virginia
- African American officeholders from the end of the Civil War until before 1900
