= Forsaken =

Forsaken or The Forsaken may refer to:

== Film and television ==
- "Forsaken" (Stargate SG-1), the eighteenth episode of the sixth season of Stargate SG-1
- "The Forsaken" (Star Trek: Deep Space Nine), the seventeenth episode of the first season of Star Trek: Deep Space Nine
- The Forsaken (2001 film), a horror film starring Brendan Fehr and Kerr Smith
- The Forsaken (1937 film), a French war drama film
- The Prophecy: Forsaken, the latest film in The Prophecy series
- Forsaken (2015 film), a western-drama film starring Kiefer Sutherland and Donald Sutherland
- Forsaken (2018 film), a Russian film
- Forsaken (2026 film), a French film

== Gaming ==
- Forsaken (video game), a first person shooting video game similar to Descent
- Forsaken (series), a series of World of Warcraft machinima produced by Edgeworks Entertainment
- The Forsaken, an undead faction in the Warcraft series of games
- Werewolf: The Forsaken, a role-playing game published by White Wolf, Inc.
- Destiny 2: Forsaken, the third expansion to 2017's first-person shooter Destiny 2

== Literature ==
- Forsaken (The Wheel of Time), a group of characters from the Wheel of Time fantasy series
- Forsaken (novel), a 2016 historical novel
- The Forsaken: An American Tragedy in Stalin's Russia, a 2008 history book by Tim Tzouliadis

== Music ==
- The Forsaken (album), an album by the black metal band Antestor
- Forsaken (album), an album by the Irish alternative rock band Hail The Ghost
- "Forsaken", a song by As I Lay Dying from the album An Ocean Between Us
- "Forsaken", a song by Black Label Society from the album Doom Crew Inc.
- "Forsaken", a song by Converge from the album Petitioning the Empty Sky
- "Forsaken", a song by David Draiman from the soundtrack Queen of the Damned
- "Forsaken", a song by Dream Theater from the album Systematic Chaos
- "Forsaken", a song by Obscura from the album A Valediction
- "Forsaken", a song by Seether from the album Holding Onto Strings Better Left to Fray
- "Forsaken", a song by Skillet from the album Collide
- "Forsaken", a song by VNV Nation from the album Praise the Fallen
- "Forsaken", a song by Within Temptation from the album The Silent Force
