= List of first minority male lawyers and judges in Virginia =

This is a list of the first minority male lawyer(s) and judge(s) in Virginia. It includes the year in which the men were admitted to practice law (in parentheses). Also included are men who achieved other distinctions such becoming the first in their state to graduate from law school or become a political figure.

== Firsts in Virginia's history ==
=== Lawyers ===
- First Jewish American male: James M. Wolfe (1821)
- First African American male: Wathal G. Wynn (1871)
- First African American male (practice before the Supreme Court of Virginia): Giles Beecher Jackson in 1887
- First African American male (admitted to the Virginia State Bar): Herman Benn in 1958

=== Law Clerk ===
- First African American male to clerk for the Supreme Court of Virginia: Jerrauld Jones (1980)

=== State judges ===
- First African American male (elected): Daniel M. Norton in 1866
- First African American male (actively serve): James A. Fields in 1879
- First African American male (since Reconstruction Era): Willard Douglas (1949) in 1974
- First African American male (Circuit Court): Thomas R. Monroe, Sr. in 1982
- First African American male (Virginia Supreme Court): John Charles Thomas (1975) in 1983
- First African American male (Virginia Court of Appeals): James W. Benton in 1984
- First Native American (Cherokee) male: Charles Riley Cloud in 1986
- First African American male (Chief Justice; Virginia Supreme Court): Leroy R. Hassell Sr. (1980) in 2003
- First Asian American male (Vietnamese descent): John M. Tran (1984) in 2013
- First openly gay male: Tracy Thorne-Begland in 2013
- First Indian American male: Rupen Shah in 2017

=== Federal judges ===
- First African American male: James R. Spencer (1974) in 1986
- First African American male (U.S. Court of Appeals for the Fourth Circuit): Roger Gregory (1978) in 2000
- First African American male (United States District Court for the Eastern District of Virginia): Ivan D. Davis in 2008
- First African American male (Chief Justice; U.S. Court of Appeals for the Fourth Circuit): Roger Gregory (1978) in 2016
- First (African American) openly LGBT male (United States District Court for the Eastern District of Virginia): Jamar K. Walker in 2023

=== Attorneys General of Virginia ===
- First Latino American male: Jason Miyares in 2022
- First African American male: Jay Jones in 2026

=== United States Attorney ===
- First minority male (Indian American; Eastern District of Virginia): Raj Parekh in 2021

=== Assistant United States Attorney ===
- First African American male (Eastern District of Virginia): William T. Mason, Jr.

=== Political Office ===
- First Indian American (Congressman-elect): Suhas Subramanyam in 2024

=== Bar associations ===
- First Jewish American male (President; Virginia State Bar): Michael A. Glasser in 2014
- First African American male (President; Virginia Bar Association): Victor Cardwell in 2022

== Firsts in local history ==
- Walter H. Land: First African American male lawyer in the Tidewater Region of Virginia
- Eugene Butler: First African American male to serve as a Judge of the 24th Judicial District (2023) [Amherst, Bedford, Campbell, Lynchburg (city) and Nelson Counties, Virginia]
- Thomas R. Monroe, Sr.: First African American male judge in Arlington County, Virginia. He was also the first African American male admitted to the Arlington County Bar Association.
- Jesse Pollard: First African American male judge in Arlington County, Virginia
- Daniel T. Lopez: First Latino American male judge in Arlington County, Virginia (2019)
- Gregory Swanson: First African American male admitted to the University of Virginia School of Law (1950)
- John Merchant: First African American male to graduate from the University of Virginia School of Law (1958)
- Larry S. Gibson (1967): First African American male to serve as a law professor for the University of Virginia School of Law (1972)
- Marcellus Sheppard: First African American male lawyer in Bristol, Virginia
- Dr. Ralph Brown: First African American male to serve as the Assistant City Attorney of Charlottesville, Virginia
- James Ghee (c. 1970s): First African American male lawyer in Farmville, Cumberland County and Prince Edward County, Virginia
- Marcus Doyle Williams: First African American male judge in Fairfax County, Virginia (1987)
- Thomas Calhoun "T.C." Walker: First African American male lawyer in Gloucester County, Virginia
- Garland P. Faison: First African American male to serve as a Justice of the Peace in Greensville County, Virginia
- Wilford Taylor, Jr.: First African American male judge in Hampton, Virginia
- Joseph (J.) Thomas Newsome: First African American male lawyer from post-Civil War Newport News, Virginia to practice before the Supreme Court of Virginia
- David F. Pugh: First African American male judge in Newport News, Virginia (1990)
- R.G.L. Paige: Reputed to be the first African American male lawyer in Norfolk, Virginia
- Lester V. Moore: First African American male judge in Norfolk, Virginia (c. 1975)
- Carlos Flores Laboy: First Latino American male judge in Prince William County, Virginia (2020)
- Herman Benn (1958): First African American male lawyer, Assistant City Attorney (1967), and Assistant Commonwealth's Attorney (1976) in Richmond, Virginia
- T.D. Taylor (c. 1969): First African American male lawyer in Warsaw, Richmond County, Virginia
- Onzlee Ware: First African American male to serve as a Judge of the Roanoke Circuit Court (2020)
- Kevin Duffan: First African American male to serve as a circuit judge in Virginia Beach, Virginia (2020)
- James A. Fields: First African American male lawyer and judicial officer in Warwick County, Virginia
- Albert Durant Sr.: First African American male to serve as a Justice of the Peace and magistrate in Williamsburg, Virginia [Williamsburg-James City County, Virginia]
- William Stone: First African American male judge in Williamsburg-James City County, Virginia
- A. Benjamin Spencer: First African American male to serve as the Dean of the College of William & Mary (2020)

== See also ==
- List of first minority male lawyers and judges in the United States

== Other topics of interest ==
- List of first women lawyers and judges in the United States
- List of first women lawyers and judges in Virginia
