= Charles Sterling Hutcheson =

American judge

Senior Judge of the United States District Court for the Eastern District of Virginia
- In office September 1, 1959 – October 24, 1969

Chief Judge of the United States District Court for the Eastern District of Virginia
- In office 1948–1959
- Preceded by: Office established
- Succeeded by: Albert Vickers Bryan

Judge of the United States District Court for the Eastern District of Virginia
- In office February 10, 1944 – September 1, 1959
- Appointed by: Franklin D. Roosevelt
- Preceded by: Luther B. Way
- Succeeded by: Oren Ritter Lewis

Personal details
- Born: July 23, 1894 Mecklenburg County, Virginia, US
- Died: October 24, 1969 (aged 75)
- Education: University of Virginia; College of William & Mary

Charles Sterling Hutcheson (July 23, 1894 – October 24, 1969) was a United States district judge of the United States District Court for the Eastern District of Virginia.

== Early life and education ==
Born in Mecklenburg County, Virginia, to Mary Hutcheson Young and her lawyer husband, Mecklenburg county clerk Herbert Farrar Hutcheson, C. Sterling Hutcheson would have six brothers and a sister. His family had been large landowners and influential in Mecklenburg County for more than a century. His grandfather, Joseph C. Hutcheson, was one of the county's largest landowners and a justice of the peace, although he lost his one attempt at election to the Virginia House of Delegates (in 1855). Young Sterling was named for a great-uncle, Col. Charles Sterling Hutcheson, a plantation owner who served one term as a Whig in the Virginia House of Delegates, then became the county's circuit judge and raised a regiment for the Confederate States Army during the American Civil War, and after receiving a pardon from President Andrew Johnson, remained in Mecklenburg county to care for a disabled son (also C.S. Hutcheson, rather than move to Texas to join his son Joseph Chappell Hutcheson, who survived his Confederate service and became a U.S. Congressman and leading citizen in Houston, although his eldest son, lawyer and CSA Captain John William Hutcheson, died of wounds received defending Richmond at the Battle of Cold Harbor. His next-eldest brother, John Young Hutcheson, served as the deputy clerk under their father, but their brother Nathaniel Goode Hutcheson succeeded their father as the county clerk, and another brother, Joseph Collier Hutcheson would represent the county in the Virginia Senate (1906–1972) during Massive Resistance. Their brother Herbert Farrar Hutcheson would become an executive with Imperial Tobacco Company and begin writing the family's history, which C. Sterling Hutcheson would help finish after his retirement. Meanwhile, C. Sterling Hutcheson attended the University of Virginia and the College of William & Mary. He served as a private in the United States Army from 1918 to 1919.

== Early career ==
After admission to the Virginia bar, Hutcheson entered private practice in Boydton, Virginia from 1920 to 1944. During the Great Depression, he served as the United States Attorney for the Eastern District of Virginia from 1933 to 1944.

== Federal judicial service ==
Hutcheson was nominated by President Franklin D. Roosevelt on January 19, 1944, to a seat on the United States District Court for the Eastern District of Virginia vacated by deceased Judge Luther B. Way. He was confirmed by the United States Senate on February 8, 1944, and received his commission on February 10, 1944. He served as Chief Judge from 1948 to 1959. He assumed senior status on September 1, 1959. His service terminated on October 24, 1969, due to his death.

=== Racial discrimination cases ===
Although Judge Hutcheson had a docket of many varieties of cases, his rulings in racial discrimination cases became the most controversial, including with his neighbors in southside Virginia. Shortly before Judge Way's final illness, he had ruled against a black fireman working for the Norfolk Southern Railroad, and who had sued the Brotherhood of Locomotive Firemen & Enginemen for excluding blacks from their union, but the Fourth Circuit remanded the case for further consideration of jurisdictional questions and the federal Railway Labor Act. Judge Hutcheson soon granted summary judgement for the plaintiff fireman, which the appellate court affirmed. In 1945, Judge Hutcheson ruled that the Newport News School Board had not complied with an order forbidding discrimination against black teachers issued by Judge Way.

In 1948, three years after Judge Pollard required Richmond to equalize its teachers' pay, Judge Hutcheson handled four significant racial discrimination cases. In one, he required Surry County to provide equal buildings and equipment for its black schools, which the Richmond Times Dispatch realized could foretell the ending of dual school systems based on race. Judge Hutcheson also decided a schoolteacher pay discrimination case against the school board of Chesterfield County. He also decided cases brought by black parents against the King George County and Gloucester County school boards, which failed to meet the "separate but equal" standard set forth in Plessy v. Ferguson, and two years later found the board and superintendent guilty of contempt of court for failing to comply with his orders and imposed $250 individual fines, which future Justice Thurgood Marshall believed encouraging.

=== Stanley Plan decision ===
Beginning in 1955, Hutcheson served on a 3-judge panel with new district judge Walter E. Hoffman and senior 4th Circuit judge Morris Ames Soper (previously a state and federal trial judge in Baltimore, Maryland). That three judge panel issued a decision on January 19, 1959, declaring parts of the Stanley Plan (enacted as part of Massive Resistance to the desegregation mandate in Brown v. Board of Education) violated the United States Constitution; and the Virginia Supreme Court on the same day (Robert E. Lee's birthday, a holiday in Virginia) issued a decision declaring other aspects of the Stanley Plan unconstitutional under the Virginia Constitution. However, some local leaders (including his state senator brother) continued to inflame controversy for several years, which Hutcheson avoided by retiring.

== Papers ==
In 1983, Hutcheson's widow donated his papers to the Library of Virginia, which also has the papers of his state senator brother, Joseph Collier Hutcheson .

Legal offices
Preceded by Paul W. Kear	United States Attorney for the Eastern District of Virginia; 1933–1944	Succeeded by Henry Holt
Preceded by Luther B. Way	Judge of the United States District Court for the Eastern District of Virginia; 1944–1959	Succeeded by Oren Ritter Lewis
Preceded by Office established	Chief Judge of the United States District Court for the Eastern District of Virginia; 1948–1959	Succeeded by Albert Vickers Bryan
