= Mark Steven Davis =

American judge (born 1962)

Mark Davis

Chief Judge of the United States District Court for the Eastern District of Virginia
- In office December 4, 2018 – December 4, 2025
- Preceded by: Rebecca Beach Smith
- Succeeded by: M. Hannah Lauck

Judge of the United States District Court for the Eastern District of Virginia
- Incumbent
- Assumed office June 23, 2008
- Appointed by: George W. Bush
- Preceded by: T. S. Ellis III

Personal details
- Born: Mark Steven Davis; 1962 (age 62–63) Portsmouth, Virginia, U.S.
- Education: University of Virginia (BA); Washington and Lee University (JD)

Mark Steven Davis (born 1962) is a United States district judge of the United States District Court for the Eastern District of Virginia.

== Education and career ==
Davis was born in Portsmouth, Virginia. He attended Longwood College in Farmville, transferring to and receiving a Bachelor of Arts degree from the University of Virginia in 1984, and a Juris Doctor from Washington and Lee University School of Law in 1988. He was a law clerk for Judge John Ashton MacKenzie of the United States District Court for the Eastern District of Virginia from 1988 to 1989. He was in private practice in Virginia from 1989 to 2003, serving in McGuireWoods from 1989 to 1998 and at Carr-Porter LLC from 1998 to 2003, where he served as an expert on maritime law. He was a judge on the Portsmouth Circuit Court, Third Judicial Circuit of Virginia from 2003 to 2008.

=== Federal judicial service ===
On November 15, 2007, Davis was nominated by President George W. Bush to a seat on the United States District Court for the Eastern District of Virginia vacated by Judge T. S. Ellis III. Davis was confirmed by the United States Senate on June 10, 2008, and received his commission on June 23, 2008. He became chief judge on December 4, 2018.

== Sources ==
Legal offices
Preceded by T. S. Ellis III	Judge of the United States District Court for the Eastern District of Virginia; 2008–present	Incumbent
Preceded by Rebecca Beach Smith	Chief Judge of the United States District Court for the Eastern District of Virginia; 2018–2025	Succeeded by M. Hannah Lauck
