= M. Hannah Lauck =

American federal judge (born 1963)

Hannah Lauck
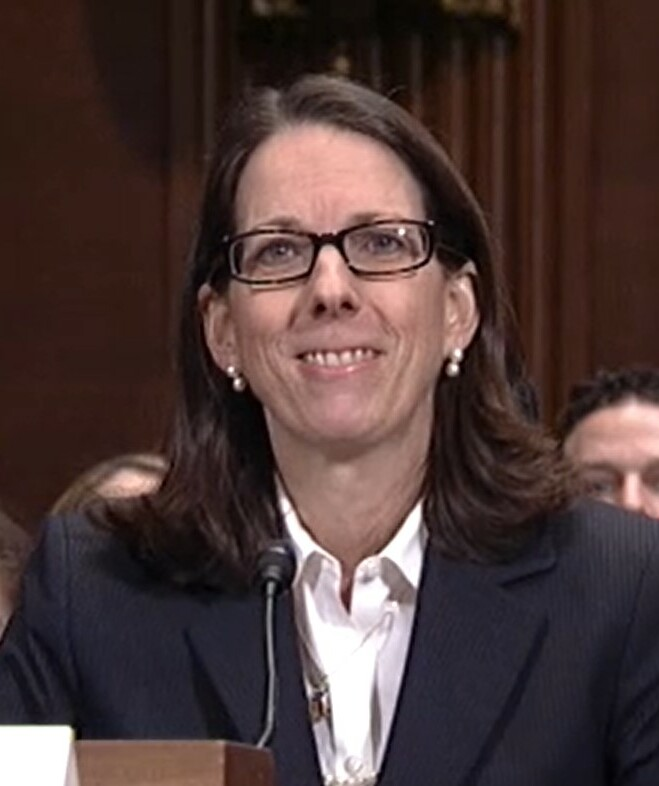
- Lauck in 2014

Chief Judge of the United States District Court for the Eastern District of Virginia
- Incumbent
- Assumed office December 4, 2025
- Preceded by: Mark Steven Davis

Judge of the United States District Court for the Eastern District of Virginia
- Incumbent
- Assumed office June 10, 2014
- Appointed by: Barack Obama
- Preceded by: James R. Spencer

Personal details
- Born: Mary Hannah Lauck; 1963 (age 62–63) Alexandria, Virginia, U.S.
- Domestic partner: Jay Wood
- Education: Wellesley College (BA); Yale University (JD)

Mary Hannah Lauck (born 1963) is an American lawyer and jurist serving as the chief United States district judge of the United States District Court for the Eastern District of Virginia. She previously served as a United States magistrate judge of the same court.

== Biography ==
Lauck received a Bachelor of Arts degree, magna cum laude, in 1986 from Wellesley College. She received a Juris Doctor in 1991 from Yale Law School. She served as a law clerk to Judge James R. Spencer of the United States District Court for the Eastern District of Virginia from 1991 to 1992. She worked at the law firm of Anderson, Kill, Olick & Oshinsky, from 1992 to 1994. From 1994 to 2004, she was an assistant United States attorney in the Eastern District of Virginia. She was the supervising attorney at Genworth Financial, Inc., from 2004 to 2005.

=== Federal judicial service ===
From 2005 to 2014, she served as a United States magistrate judge in the Eastern District of Virginia.

On December 19, 2013, President Barack Obama nominated Lauck to serve as a United States district judge of the United States District Court for the Eastern District of Virginia, to the seat which was vacated by Judge James R. Spencer, who assumed senior status on March 25, 2014. She received a hearing before the United States Senate Judiciary Committee on February 25, 2014. On March 27, 2014, her nomination was reported out of committee by a voice vote. On June 5, 2014, Senate Majority Leader Harry Reid filed for cloture on the nomination. On June 9, 2014, The United States Senate invoked cloture on her nomination by a 52–32 vote. On June 10, 2014, her nomination was confirmed by a 90–0 vote. She received her judicial commission on June 10, 2014. She became the court's chief judge on December 4, 2025.

Legal offices
Preceded by James R. Spencer	Judge of the United States District Court for the Eastern District of Virginia} 2014–present	Incumbent
Preceded by Mark Steven Davis	Chief Judge of the United States District Court for the Eastern District of Virginia; 2025–present	Incumbent
