= David Dortch Warriner =

American judge

Judge of the United States District Court for the Eastern District of Virginia
- In office May 21, 1974 – March 17, 1986
- Appointed by: Richard Nixon
- Preceded by: Oren Ritter Lewis
- Succeeded by: Rebecca Beach Smith

Personal details
- Born: February 25, 1929 Brunswick County, Virginia
- Died: March 17, 1986 (aged 57) Brunswick County, Virginia
- Education: University of North Carolina at Chapel Hill (B.A.); University of Virginia School of Law (LL.B.)

David Dortch Warriner (February 25, 1929 – March 17, 1986) was a United States district judge of the United States District Court for the Eastern District of Virginia.

== Education and career ==
Born in Brunswick County, Virginia, Warriner received a Bachelor of Arts degree from the University of North Carolina at Chapel Hill in 1951 and a Bachelor of Laws from the University of Virginia School of Law in 1957. He was in the United States Navy as a Lieutenant (JG) from 1951 to 1954. He was in private practice in Emporia, Virginia from 1957 to 1974. He was city attorney of Emporia from 1969 to 1974.

== Federal judicial service ==
Warriner was nominated by President Richard Nixon on May 6, 1974, to a seat on the United States District Court for the Eastern District of Virginia vacated by Judge Oren Ritter Lewis. He was confirmed by the United States Senate on May 16, 1974, and received his commission on May 21, 1974. Warriner served in that capacity until his death of an apparent heart attack on March 17, 1986, in Brunswick County.

== Sources ==
Legal offices
Preceded by Oren Ritter Lewis	Judge of the United States District Court for the Eastern District of Virginia; 1974–1986	Succeeded by Rebecca Beach Smith
