= Oren Ritter Lewis =

American judge

Senior Judge of the United States District Court for the Eastern District of Virginia
- In office January 1, 1974 – June 12, 1983

Judge of the United States District Court for the Eastern District of Virginia
- In office May 31, 1960 – January 1, 1974
- Appointed by: Dwight D. Eisenhower
- Preceded by: Charles Sterling Hutcheson
- Succeeded by: David Dortch Warriner

Personal details
- Born: October 7, 1902 Seymour, Indiana, U.S.
- Died: June 12, 1983 (aged 80) Arlington County, Virginia, U.S.
- Resting place: Columbia Gardens Cemetery; Arlington, Virginia, U.S.
- Education: George Washington University Law School (LL.B.)

Oren Ritter Lewis (October 7, 1902 – June 12, 1983) was a United States district judge of the United States District Court for the Eastern District of Virginia.

== Education and career ==
Born in Seymour, Indiana, Lewis received a Bachelor of Laws from George Washington University Law School in 1939. He was in private practice in Arlington County, Virginia from 1940 to 1960.

== Federal judicial service ==
On March 21, 1960, Lewis was nominated by President Dwight D. Eisenhower to a seat on the United States District Court for the Eastern District of Virginia vacated by Judge Charles Sterling Hutcheson. Lewis was confirmed by the United States Senate on May 31, 1960, and received his commission the same day. He was a member of the Judicial Conference of the United States from 1970 to 1973. He assumed senior status on January 1, 1974. He served in that capacity until his death.

== Death ==
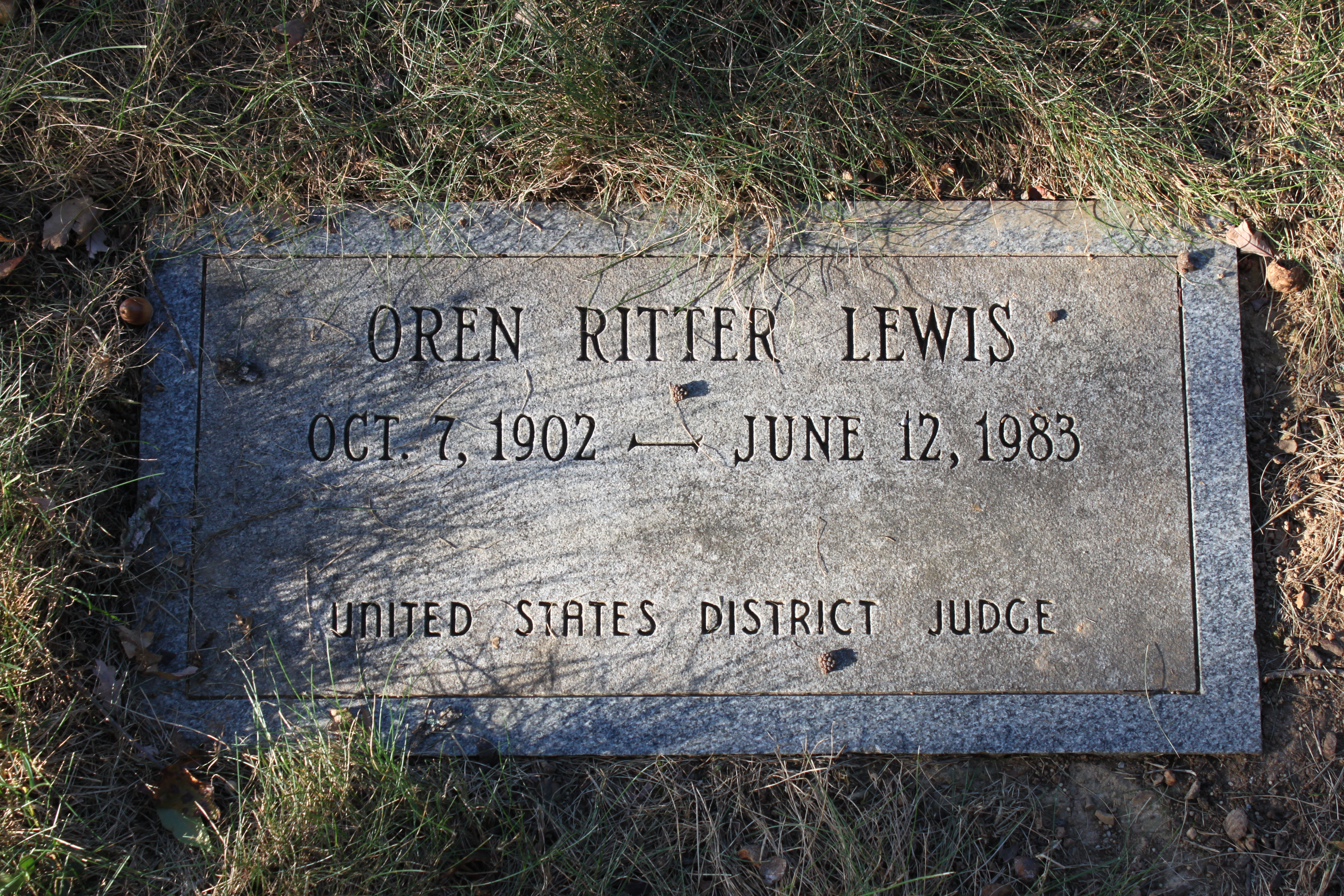
Grave of Lewis in Columbia Gardens Cemetery

Lewis died of a heart attack suffered at his Arlington County home on June 12, 1983, dying at Arlington Hospital in Arlington County. He continued to preside over cases up until his death. Lewis is buried at the Columbia Gardens Cemetery in Arlington.

Legal offices
Preceded by Charles Sterling Hutcheson	Judge of the United States District Court for the Eastern District of Virginia; 1960–1974	Succeeded by David Dortch Warriner
