= J. Thomas Newsome House =

Historic house in Virginia, United States

- U.S. National Register of Historic Places
- Virginia Landmarks Register
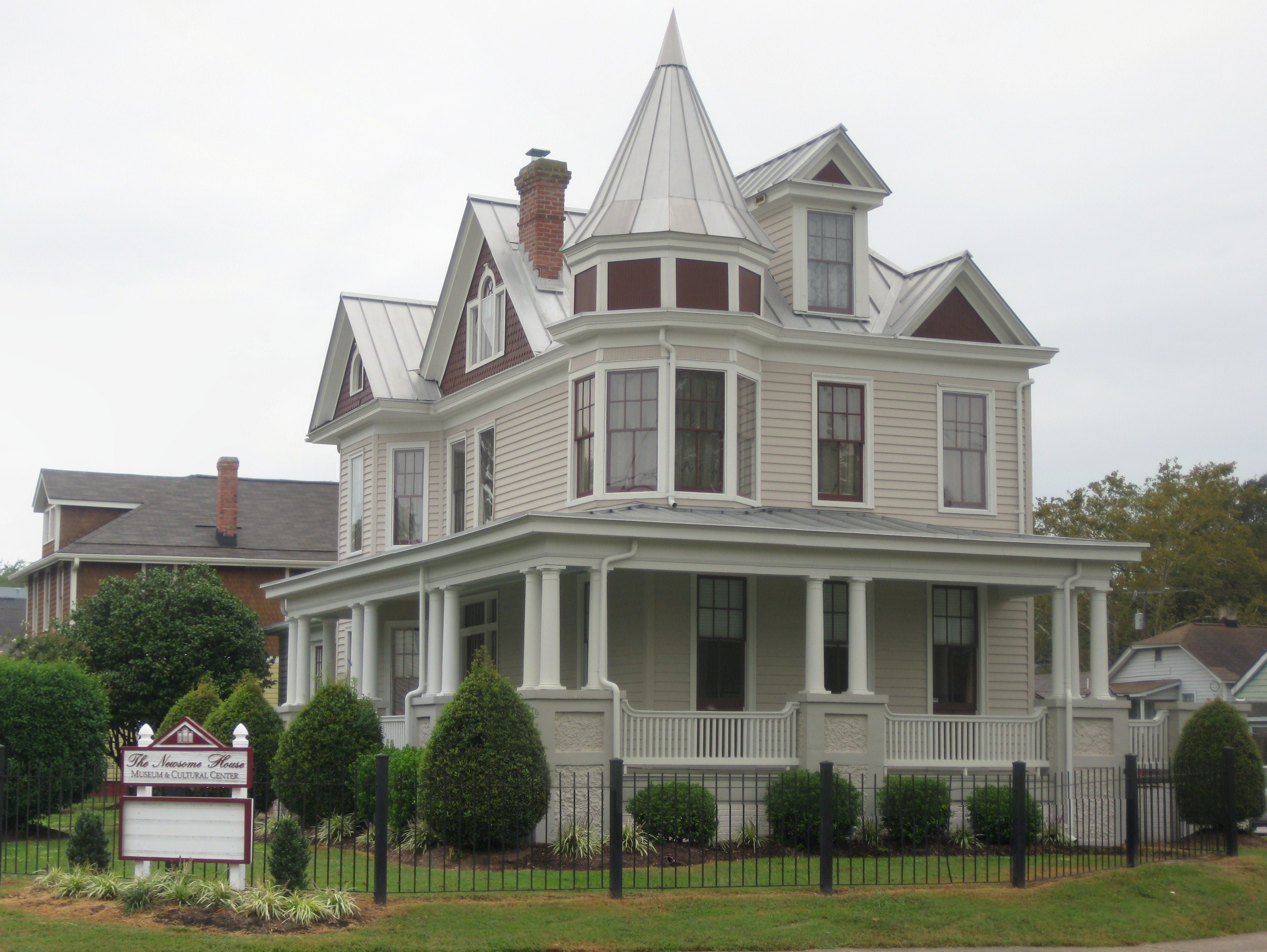
- J. Thomas Newsome House, September 2012

- Location within Virginia Location within the United States
- Location: 2803 Oak Ave., Newport News, Virginia
- Coordinates: 36°59′23″N 76°24′18″W
- Area: 0.3 acres (0.12 ha)
- Built: 1898
- Architectural style: Queen Anne
- NRHP reference No.: 90001831
- VLR No.: 121-0052

Significant dates
- Added to NRHP: December 19, 1990
- Designated VLR: December 12, 1989

J. Thomas Newsome House is a historic home located at Newport News, Virginia. It was built in 1898, and is a three-story, seven-bay, asymmetrical, frame Queen Anne style dwelling. It features a steeply pitched irregularly composed roof, three sided bay, front Palladian window, and corner tower. From 1906 until 1942, it was the residence of J. Thomas Newsome (1869–1942), an African-American attorney and journalist.

The restored house is open to the public as the Newsome House Museum & Cultural Center, and features exhibits related to African-American art, history and culture.

It was listed on the National Register of Historic Places in 1990.

== Early history ==
In 1899, the house was constructed by the Granger family, a prominent African American professional family in Newport News, following their relocation from Oklahoma Territory in 1895. William R. R. Granger, a physician and former public official, built the residence as a permanent home for his family during Newport News’s late-19th-century industrial expansion.

The family’s son Lester Granger, later a nationally recognized civil rights leader and executive secretary of the National Urban League, was born in Newport News in 1896, prior to the completion of the house. The Granger family’s residence reflects broader patterns of African American migration and settlement in industrializing cities of the Upper South during this period.
