= Luther B. Way =

American judge

Judge of the United States District Court for the Eastern District of Virginia
- In office March 4, 1931 – October 23, 1943
- Appointed by: Herbert Hoover
- Preceded by: Duncan Lawrence Groner
- Succeeded by: Charles Sterling Hutcheson

Personal details
- Born: September 26, 1879 Alamance County, North Carolina
- Died: October 23, 1943 (aged 64) Norfolk, Virginia
- Education: University of Virginia School of Law

Luther Bynum Way (September 26, 1879 – October 23, 1943) was a United States district judge of the United States District Court for the Eastern District of Virginia.

== Early and family life ==
Born in Alamance County, North Carolina, Way graduated from the University of Virginia School of Law in 1907. He married Ione Hornaday, and they had three sons: Franklin (b. 1911), Luther Jr. (b. 1913) and O. Newton (b. 1915).

== Legal career ==
Admitted to the Virginia bar, Way was in private practice in Norfolk from 1907 to 1922, and tried to revitalize the Republican party in the Tidewater region. As campaign manager for Menalcus Lankford, he did twice secure his friend's election to Congress. He was a special assistant to the United States Attorney in the United States Department of Justice in 1922. He was in private practice in Norfolk, Virginia from 1923 to 1931, and widely endorsed for the judicial post.

== Federal judicial service ==
On February 21, 1931, President Herbert Hoover nominated Way to a seat on the United States District Court for the Eastern District of Virginia when Judge Duncan Lawrence Groner was promoted to the U.S. Court of Appeals for the District of Columbia Circuit. The United States Senate confirmed Way on March 2, 1931, and he received his commission on March 4, 1931. He served in that capacity until his death on October 23, 1943, in Norfolk.

Because of the Great Depression, bankruptcies and receiverships (including of the Norfolk Southern Railway) in 1932, dominated his docket. Until Prohibition ended in December 1933, he also heard many liquor cases, as the Internal Revenue Service campaigned against untaxed liquor. He also was scheduled to hear the Curtiss Wright Corporation's libel suit against famed aviator Billy Mitchell, which was dismissed after Mitchell's death in 1936. During the New Deal, Judge Way heard cases concerning constitutionality of the Agricultural Adjustment Act, which the U.S. Supreme Court ultimately ruled unconstitutional. He also upheld the Railway Labor Act in 1934, deciding against the Virginian Railway and in favor of AFL Railway Employees Union No. 40. In 1935, he was joined by Judge Robert N. Pollard, the first Democrat to become a judge in the district since the Civil War, and they would sit on several 3-judge panels in the next years.

Two of the more controversial cases Judge Way decided involved disparate pay for black schoolteachers and administrators. In the first case, involving Margaret Alston, Way had granted the school board's motion to dismiss, holding that Alston had accepted the lower pay in her annual contract. The Fourth Circuit Court of Appeals reversed him, and the U.S. Supreme Court denied the school board's petition for review. Thus, when a similar matter involving schoolteacher Dorothy Roles reached Judge Way, in January 1943, he issued an injunction forbidding further pay discrimination.

== Death and legacy ==
Judge Way died of a heart attack on October 23, 1943, about two weeks after being hospitalized for a heart condition. He was survived by his two older sons, who both served in the U.S. Army during World War II. He was preceded in death by his youngest son (1935) and his wife (1940). He was buried at Norfolk's Forest Lawn cemetery.

Legal offices
Preceded by Duncan Lawrence Groner	Judge of the United States District Court for the Eastern District of Virginia; 1931–1943	Succeeded by Charles Sterling Hutcheson
