= James R. Spencer =

American judge

James Randolph Spencer

Senior Judge of the United States District Court for the Eastern District of Virginia
- In office March 25, 2014 – June 2, 2017

Chief Judge of the United States District Court for the Eastern District of Virginia
- In office 2004–2011
- Preceded by: Claude M. Hilton
- Succeeded by: Rebecca Beach Smith

Judge of the United States District Court for the Eastern District of Virginia
- In office October 14, 1986 – March 25, 2014
- Appointed by: Ronald Reagan
- Preceded by: John Ashton MacKenzie
- Succeeded by: M. Hannah Lauck

Personal details
- Born: James Randolph Spencer; 1949 (age 76–77) Florence, South Carolina
- Education: Clark College (BA); Harvard University (JD); Howard University (MDiv)

Military service
- Allegiance: United States
- Branch/service: United States Army
- Years of service: 1975-1978, 1981-1986
- Rank: Captain
- Unit: J.A.G. Corps

James Randolph Spencer (born 1949) is a former United States district judge for the United States District Court for the Eastern District of Virginia.

== Early life and education ==
He was born in Florence, South Carolina in 1949 and attended Clark College in Atlanta, Georgia, graduating with a Bachelor of Arts degree in 1971. He earned Juris Doctor in 1974 at Harvard Law School. After Harvard, he was commissioned as a captain in the J.A.G. Corps. He served in that capacity from 1975 until 1978. After being honorably discharged from active duty, he was appointed Assistant United States Attorney for the District of Columbia, serving there from 1978 until 1983. He also was recommissioned in the United States Army Reserves, serving as a Military Judge from 1981 until 1986. From 1983 until 1986, he served as an Assistant United States Attorney for the Eastern District of Virginia. In 1985, Spencer earned a Master of Divinity degree from Howard University.

== Federal judicial service ==
James R. Spencer was nominated by President Ronald Reagan on September 9, 1986, to the a seat on the United States District Court for the Eastern District of Virginia, Richmond Division. He was confirmed by the United States Senate on October 8, 1986, and received his commission on October 14, 1986. He was the first African American to be appointed as a federal judge in Virginia. From 2004 to 2011, Judge Spencer was Chief Judge of the Eastern District of Virginia. He was succeeded as Chief Judge by Rebecca Beach Smith. He assumed senior status on March 25, 2014. He retired from active service on June 2, 2017.

=== United States v. Robert McDonnell ===
He presided over the highly visible trial of former Virginia Governor Bob McDonnell and First Lady Maureen McDonnell who were convicted of federal corruption charges. The Supreme Court ruled on the certiorari granted in relation to United States v. Robert McDonnell in 2016.

== Personal life ==
His wife, Margaret Spencer is a Judge on the Richmond, Virginia Circuit Court.

== See also ==
- List of African-American federal judges
- List of African-American jurists
- List of first minority male lawyers and judges in Virginia

Legal offices
Preceded by John Ashton MacKenzie	Judge of the United States District Court for the Eastern District of Virginia; 1986–2014	Succeeded by M. Hannah Lauck
Preceded by Claude M. Hilton	Chief Judge of the United States District Court for the Eastern District of Virginia; 2004–2011	Succeeded by Rebecca Beach Smith
