= Roderick C. Young =

American judge (born 1966)

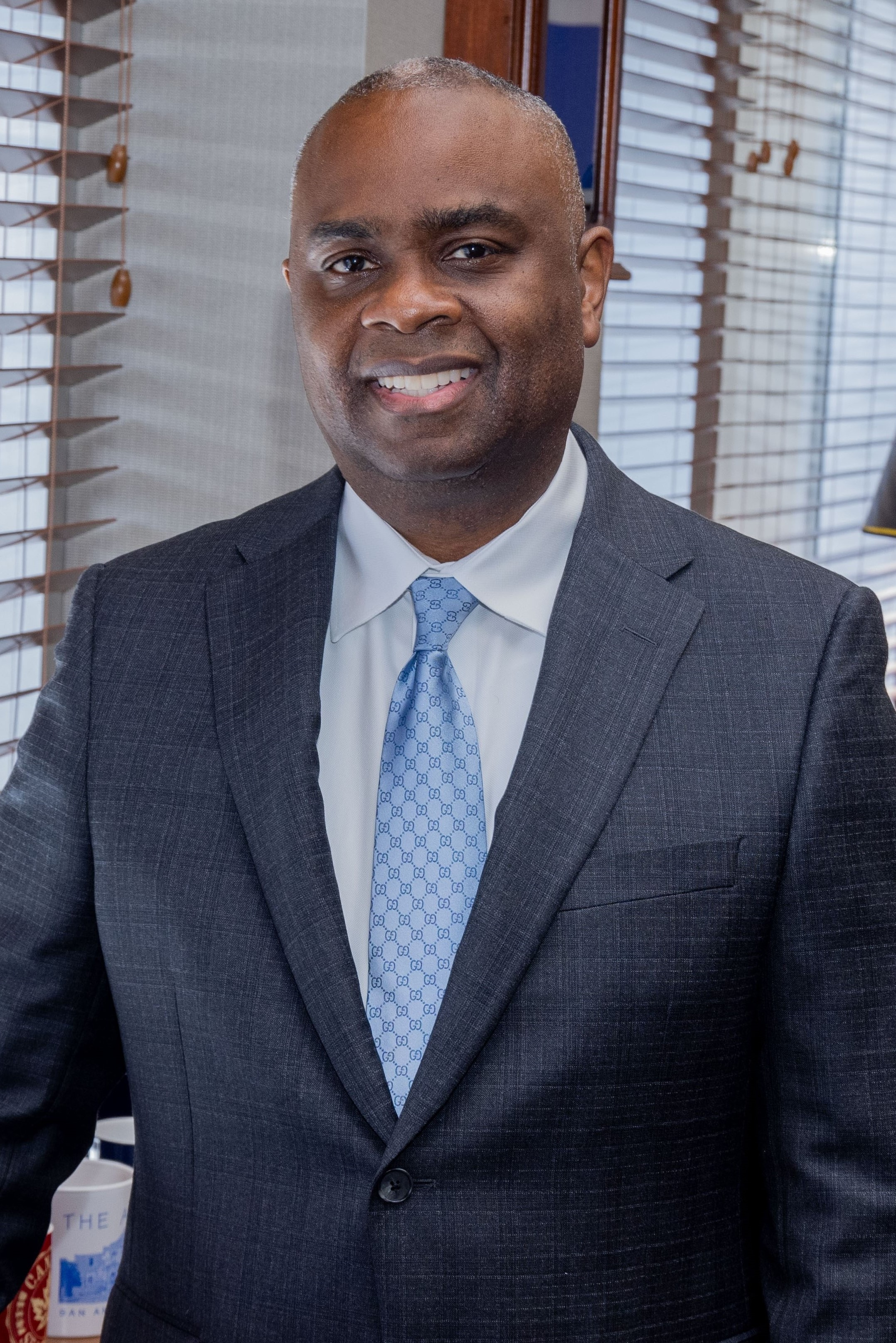

Judge of the United States District Court for the Eastern District of Virginia
- Incumbent
- Assumed office September 29, 2020
- Appointed by: Donald Trump
- Preceded by: Rebecca Beach Smith

Magistrate Judge of the United States District Court for the Eastern District of Virginia
- In office October 28, 2014 – September 29, 2020

Personal details
- Born: Roderick Charles Young; 1966 (age 59–60) Petersburg, Virginia, U.S.
- Education: George Mason University (BA, MA); West Virginia University (JD)

Roderick Charles Young (born 1966) is a United States district judge of the United States District Court for the Eastern District of Virginia and former United States magistrate judge of the same court.

== Education ==
Young earned his Bachelor of Arts in 1989 and Master of Arts in 1994 from George Mason University, and his Juris Doctor from the West Virginia University College of Law in 1994.

== Career ==
After admission to the Virginia bar, he became an assistant public defender for the Portsmouth, Virginia Public Defender's Office from 1996 to 1998. He then spent four years from 1998 to 2002 as a prosecutor in Richmond, Virginia, eventually becoming a Senior Assistant Commonwealth's Attorney from 2000 to 2002. Young then served for twelve years as an Assistant United States Attorney for the Eastern District of Virginia from 2002 to 2014, rising to become the Deputy Criminal Supervisor from 2012 to 2014. Attorney Young also once served as a special assistant United States attorney for the District of Columbia from 2001 to 2002, and is also an adjunct professor at William & Mary Law School since 2018.

=== Federal judicial service ===
Young served as a United States magistrate judge of the United States District Court for the Eastern District of Virginia, a position he was appointed to on October 28, 2014, and left in 2020 upon becoming a district judge.

On March 20, 2020, Young's name along with fellow Magistrate Judge Douglas Miller was recommended by Virginia Senators Tim Kaine and Mark Warner to the White House. On May 6, 2020, President Donald Trump announced his intent to nominate Young to serve as a United States district judge for the United States District Court for the Eastern District of Virginia. On May 21, 2020, his nomination was sent to the United States Senate. He has been nominated to the seat vacated by Judge Rebecca Beach Smith, who assumed senior status on August 1, 2019. A hearing on his nomination before the Senate Judiciary Committee was held on June 24, 2020. On July 30, 2020, his nomination was reported out of committee by a 22–0 vote. On September 23, 2020, the United States Senate invoked cloture on his nomination by a 93–3 vote. On September 24, 2020, his nomination was confirmed by a 93–2 vote. He received his judicial commission on September 29, 2020.

== See also ==
- List of African-American federal judges
- List of African-American jurists

Legal offices
Preceded by Rebecca Beach Smith	Judge of the United States District Court for the Eastern District of Virginia; 2020–present	Incumbent
