= Rebecca Beach Smith =

American judge (born 1949)

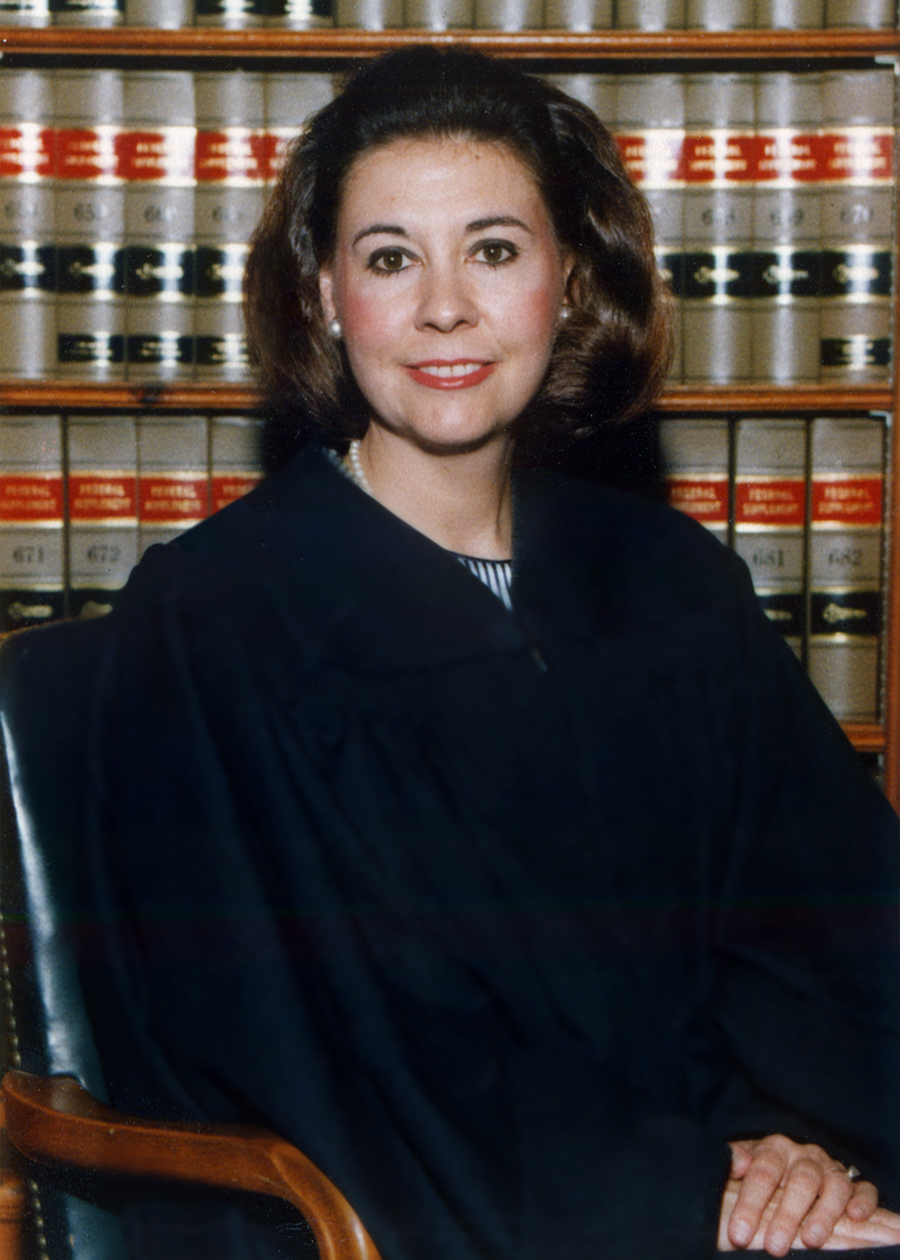

Senior Judge of the United States District Court for the Eastern District of Virginia
- Incumbent
- Assumed office August 1, 2019

Chief Judge of the United States District Court for the Eastern District of Virginia
- In office December 4, 2011 – December 4, 2018
- Preceded by: James R. Spencer
- Succeeded by: Mark Steven Davis

Judge of the United States District Court for the Eastern District of Virginia
- In office October 25, 1989 – August 1, 2019
- Appointed by: George H. W. Bush
- Preceded by: David Dortch Warriner
- Succeeded by: Roderick C. Young

Magistrate Judge of the United States District Court for the Eastern District of Virginia
- In office 1985–1989

Personal details
- Born: 1949 (age 76–77) Hopewell, Virginia, U.S.
- Education: College of William & Mary (BA, JD); University of Virginia (MA)

Rebecca Beach Smith (born 1949) is a senior United States district judge of the United States District Court for the Eastern District of Virginia and a civic leader. Among her many decisions is the 2011 ruling that decided the title to and restrictions upon artifacts salvaged from the wreck of the RMS Titanic.

== Early life, education ==
Smith was born in Hopewell, Virginia. She received a Bachelor of Arts degree from the College of William & Mary in 1971, and then received a Master of Arts degree from the University of Virginia in 1973. After she worked as a planning analyst for Enviro-Med, Inc. (1973-1974) and research associate at the National Academy of Sciences (1974-1977), Smith attended law school and received her Juris Doctor from William & Mary Law School in 1979. She was executive editor of the William and Mary Law Review, graduated first in her law school class and was awarded membership in the Order of the Coif. In 1997, Judge Smith received The College of William and Mary Alumni Medallion, the highest award the William and Mary Alumni Association can bestow on a graduate of the College of William and Mary.

== Career ==
After earning her Master of Arts degree, Smith was a planning analyst for Enviro-Med, Inc. in Washington, D.C., and La Jolla, California from 1973 to 1974. She then was a research associate for the National Academy of Sciences, Institute of Medicine in Washington, D.C. from 1974 to 1977. After she graduated from law school, Smith served as a law clerk in private practice in Norfolk, Virginia. She then served as a law clerk for Judge Joseph Calvitt Clarke Jr. of the United States District Court for the Eastern District of Virginia from 1979 to 1980. She was again in the private practice of law at a large firm in Norfolk from 1980 to 1985.

=== Federal judicial service ===
Before being appointed a federal district judge, she was a United States magistrate judge for the Eastern District of Virginia from 1985 to 1989.

On August 4, 1989, President George H. W. Bush nominated Smith for appointment as a United States District Judge of the United States District Court for the Eastern District of Virginia to a seat vacated by Judge D. Dortch Warriner. The United States Senate confirmed Smith's appointment on October 24, 1989, and she received her commission on October 25, 1989. She was the first female federal judge in Virginia. Smith served as Chief Judge for the Eastern District of Virginia and from December 4, 2011 until December 4, 2018. Smith assumed senior status on August 1, 2019.

== Notable decisions ==
=== Titanic artifacts decision ===
Premier Exhibitions Inc., the parent company of RMS Titanic Inc., the company that salvaged the artifacts from the wrecked ship RMS Titanic on the ocean floor, asked Judge Smith to award it sole title to the artifacts with covenants to preserve them forever. On August 15, 2011, Judge Smith granted title to thousands of artifacts from the Titanic to RMS Titanic Inc., subject to a detailed list of conditions concerning preservation of the items. The artifacts can be sold only to a company that would abide by the lengthy list of conditions and restrictions. RMS Titanic Inc., can profit from the artifacts through exhibiting them.

=== Viagra patent decision ===
Just a few days before her decision in the Titanic artifacts case, Judge Smith upheld the validity of Pfizer Inc.'s patent for the erectile dysfunction pill Viagra. The decision blocked Israeli firm Teva Pharmaceutical Industries Ltd., a manufacturer of generic drugs, from marketing a generic version until 2019. Teva had argued that the Pfizer patent was invalid and unenforceable. Among reasons for her decision, Judge Smith found there was no convincing evidence to support Teva's claim that Pfizer intentionally withheld documents from the U.S. Patent and Trademark Office.

== Civic work ==
In addition to her professional work, Smith has devoted much time to work with civic groups, professional associations, charities and educational institutions, including a term as President of the Alumni Association of The College of William and Mary. Judge Smith was a founding member of the I'Anson - Hoffman American Inn of Court, which "was established by charter on May 1, 1987, in Norfolk, Virginia, as part of a nationwide movement to emulate the British Inns of Court, for the purpose of promoting the goals of excellence, civility, professionalism and ethics in the legal profession" and was president of the organization between 1989 and 1991. She was a member of the Federal Judges Association's board of directors and the United States Judicial Conference Committee on Technology. She also was the president of the Norfolk Academy Board of Trustees between 2002 and 2005 and a trustee of the school, a private elementary and secondary school in Norfolk, Virginia, for eighteen years. United States Chief Justice John Roberts appointed Smith to the United States Judicial Conference Codes of Conduct Committee, and she was serving in this capacity in 2011.

Legal offices
Preceded by David Dortch Warriner	Judge of the United States District Court for the Eastern District of Virginia; 1989–2019	Succeeded by Roderick C. Young
Preceded by James R. Spencer	Chief Judge of the United States District Court for the Eastern District of Virginia; 2011–2018	Succeeded by Mark Steven Davis
