= Forsaken (novel) =

2016 novel by Ross Howell Jr.

- First edition book cover
- Author: Ross Howell Jr.
- Language: English
- Publisher: NewSouth Books
- Publication date: 2016
- Publication place: United States
- Media type: Print (hardback), e-book
- Pages: 300 pages

Forsaken is a 2016 historical fiction novel that was written by Ross Howell Jr. It was first published in hardback on February 1, 2016, through NewSouth Books and is based on the true story of Virginia Christian, a black teenage maid who was the first woman executed in the 20th century in the state of Virginia.

== Synopsis ==
The book is narrated by Charles Mears, an eighteen-year-old reporter covering the trial of Virginia Christian, who is accused of murdering her employer Ida Belote, for whom Christian worked as a maid. Belote was terribly cruel and abusive towards Christian, which culminated in a physical altercation between the two that resulted in Christian striking her boss. She stuffed cloth in her boss's mouth to muffle her screams and avoid detection, as physically harming her boss would result in severe repercussions for Christian, only for this to end up killing Belote. Mears believes that Christian deserves clemency and tries to argue for this from William Hodges Mann, who is currently serving as Virginia's governor. He's unsuccessful and Christian is executed, but Mears' defense of the teen has provoked the ire of white supremacists that continually issue threats against the reporter. During all of this Mears also tries to protect Belote's two young daughters, one of whom is being sexually abused by her appointed guardian.

== Reception ==
The Richmond Times-Dispatch praised Howell Jr.'s research for the novel, which they felt "paid handsomely in this strikingly affecting novel." The Montgomery Advisor commented that the book's "fully imagined scenes, characters and themes resonate surprisingly in the supposedly more enlightened world of 2016" and that the "novel's ending may be a bit pat, but readers won't begrudge Howell the hopeful finale." The Atlanta Journal-Constitution also reviewed the work, which they found "harrowing".
