= Inez C. Fields =

African-American lawyer

Inez C. Fields, a native of Hampton, Virginia, became one of the first known black women to become a second-generation lawyer. She graduated from Boston University School of Law in 1922 and became the second black woman admitted to the Massachusetts bar on April 15, 1924. Fields did not remain in Massachusetts, but instead returned to Virginia, where she joined her father's law firm in Hampton. On November 7, 1928, she became the third black woman admitted to the Virginia bar. Joining Marian Poe and Bertha Douglass, Inez was one of three black women practicing law in Virginia between the late 1920s and 1960.

Inez C. Fields is the daughter of George Washington Fields. George Washington Fields, who had been blind since 1896, graduated from Cornell University Law School in 1890. He is likely the first black lawyer in Virginia whose daughter followed him into the legal profession. Fields practiced with her father until his death in 1932, and then practiced on her own.
