= J. Thomas Newsome =

American lawyer

Joseph Thomas Newsome (1869–1942) was the first African-American lawyer in post-Civil War Newport News, Virginia, to practice before the Virginia Supreme Court. Newsome was a respected lawyer, newspaper editor, State Senator and civic leader who hosted many up and coming African-Americans in his historic Queen Anne home including, Booker T. Washington.

Newsome was the editor of the Newport News Star, a weekly African-American publication.

The J. Thomas Newsome House was listed on the National Register of Historic Places in 1990, and is open to the public.
