= George Washington Fields =

African-American lawyer

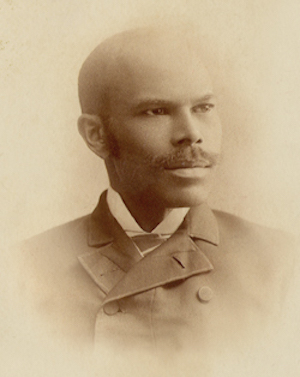
- George Washington Fields
- Born: April 25, 1854
- Died: August 19, 1932 (aged 78)
- Occupation: Lawyer

George Washington Fields (April 25, 1854 – August 19, 1932) was the first African-American graduate of Cornell Law School and among the first class of African Americans to graduate from Cornell University. He is believed to be the only former slave to graduate from Cornell.

== Early years ==
Fields was the child of Washington Fields and Martha Ann Berkley, two enslaved individuals in Virginia, and grew up on a plantation in Hanover Courthouse, Virginia. During an American Civil War skirmish in July 1863, Fields and his family escaped the plantation to Fort Monroe. Over the next decade, he intermittently pursued a public education while working various jobs as an oyster culler, hack driver, and steamboat waiter. He graduated from the Hampton Normal and Agricultural Institute in 1878 and headed north for full-time employment.

== Legal education and career ==
Following several jobs as a waiter at resorts and servant for prominent families, Fields became employed as a butler for Alonzo B. Cornell, who served as Governor of New York from 1880 to 1882. Continuing to educate himself, Fields began reading law in preparation for a legal career. Although intending to study at Yale Law School, Cornell convinced him to enroll at Cornell University, founded by Cornell's father Ezra Cornell. In 1887, Fields enrolled in the inaugural class of Cornell Law School, graduating in 1890 and having authored a thesis titled Trial by Jury.

George returned to Hampton, Virginia to practice law with his older brother. Although he lost his sight in 1896, he became a leading lawyer in the area with a large law practice of both white and Black clients, and he was active in several community organizations.

Fields died at the Dixie Hospital in Hampton in 1932.

== Family and personal life ==
Fields married Sarah "Sallie" Haws Baker on November 28, 1892, with whom he had two children. Their son died in infancy, but their daughter, Inez C. Fields, became the second Black woman admitted to the Massachusetts Bar and worked for William H. Lewis. She was the third Black woman admitted to the Virginia State Bar and worked for her father's practice. They were possibly the first Black father-daughter team to practice law in Virginia.
