= List of University of North Carolina at Chapel Hill alumni =

This is a list of notable alumni of the University of North Carolina at Chapel Hill.

== Academia ==
=== University leaders ===
Name	Class	Major	Notability
Edwin Alderman	1882		Former president of the University of North Carolina at Chapel Hill, Tulane University and University of Virginia
William Brantley Aycock	Grad.	Law	Former chancellor of the University of North Carolina at Chapel Hill
M. Katherine Banks	1985	Environmental Engineering	26th president of Texas A&M University
Kemp P. Battle	1848		Former president of the University of North Carolina at Chapel Hill
Erskine Bowles	1967	Business administration	Former president of the University of North Carolina; former U.S. Senate candidate; former White House chief of staff; co-chair president of the National Commission on Fiscal Responsibility and Reform
Mary Sue Coleman	Grad.	Biochemistry	Former president of the University of Michigan
Margaret Mordecai Jones Cruikshank	1904	Education	Former president of St. Mary's Junior College
James Danieley	Grad.	Organic chemistry	Former president of Elon University
Adam Falk	1987	Physics	President of Williams College
Elson S. Floyd	1978 / Grad.	Higher and adult education	Former president of Washington State University
Porter Lee Fortune Jr.	1941 / Grad.	History	Former chancellor of the University of Mississippi
Julius Isaac Foust	1890	Philosophy	Former president of the University of North Carolina at Greensboro
William C. Friday	Grad.	Law	Former president of the University of North Carolina
Carol Garrison	1974 / Grad.	Epidemiology	Former president of the University of Alabama at Birmingham
R. Barbara Gitenstein	Grad.	English	Current president of the College of New Jersey
Edward Kidder Graham	1898		Former president of the University of North Carolina at Chapel Hill
Frank Porter Graham	1909		Former president of the University of North Carolina at Chapel Hill, and United States senator from North Carolina
Gordon Gray	1930		Former president of the University of North Carolina, secretary of the Army, and National Security advisor
Michael Hooker	1969	Philosophy	Former chancellor of the University of North Carolina at Chapel Hill
Charles Duncan McIver	1881		Founder of the University of North Carolina at Greensboro
Heather Monroe-Blum	Grad.	Epidemiology	Former principal and vice-chancellor of McGill University
Robert Hall Morrison	1818		First president of Davidson College
Joseph S. Murphy	Grad.		Former president of Queens College and of Bennington College, and chancellor of the City University of New York
J. Michael Ortiz	Grad.	Education	Former president of California State Polytechnic University, Pomona (Cal Poly Pomona)
William L. Pollard	Grad.	Social work	Former president of Medgar Evers College and the University of the District of Columbia
Thomas Ross	Grad.	Law	Former president of the University of North Carolina, former president of Davidson College
Terry Sanford	1939 / Grad.	Law	Former president of Duke University; senator from and governor of North Carolina
Albert Micajah Shipp	1840		Former president of Wofford College and Greensboro College
J. Carlyle Sitterson	1931 / Grad.	History	Former chancellor of the University of North Carolina at Chapel Hill
Holden Thorp	1986	Chemistry	Former chancellor of the University of North Carolina at Chapel Hill
Tony Waldrop	1974 / Grad.	Political science / physiology	President of the University of South Alabama; gold medalist, 1975 Pan American Games
George T. Winston			Former president of the University of North Carolina at Chapel Hill

=== Professors ===
Name	Class	Major	Notability
Dan Ariely	Grad.	Cognitive Psychology	Professor of behavioral economics at Duke University
Valerie Ashby	Grad.	Chemistry	Dean of Trinity College of Arts and Sciences at Duke University
Beth Allison Barr	2004	History	Professor of history at Baylor University
Donald H. Baucom	1971 / Grad.	Psychology	Professor of psychology at University of North Carolina at Chapel Hill
Volker Berghahn	Grad.	History	Professor of history at Columbia University
Lewis Binford	1954	Arts & sciences	Archaeologist
Sherilynn Black		Psychology	Assistant professor of the Practice of Medical Education at Duke University
Andrew C. Boynton	Grad.	Business	Dean of Carroll School of Management at Boston College
Li Cai	Grad.	Statistics & Quantitative Psychology	Professor of education and psychology at UCLA and director of the National Center for Research on Evaluation, Standards, and Student Testing
Dan T. Carter	Grad.	History	Professor of history at the University of South Carolina
Meredith Clark	2014	Media Studies	Professor of media studies at the University of Virginia
W. H. Clatworthy	Grad.	Statistics	Professor of mathematics at the University at Buffalo
Albert Coates	1918	Arts & Sciences	Founder and director of the Institute of Government at the University of North Carolina at Chapel Hill
David R. Colburn		History	Professor of history at UNC, East Carolina University, and the University of Florida
Robert Digges Wimberly Connor	1899	Philosophy	UNC professor, historian, and Archivist of the United States
Frederick A. de Armas	Grad.	Comparative literature	Professor in Spanish and comparative literature at the University of Chicago
Elizabeth DeLong	1979	Biostatistics	Professor of biostatistics and bioinformatics at Duke University
Scott DeRue	1999	Business administration	Current dean of the Ross School of Business at the University of Michigan
David L. Downie	Grad.	Political science	Professor of politics and environment policy at Fairfield University
Carol Fowler Durham	Grad.	Nursing	Professor of nursing and medical simulation leader at the University of North Carolina at Chapel Hill
Charles Engel	1977	Economics and Political Science	Professor of economics at the University of Wisconsin
Christine Blasey Ford	1988	Psychology	Professor of psychology at Palo Alto University, also known for testifying against Brett Kavanaugh at his Supreme Court confirmation hearing
Glenda Gilmore	Grad.	History	Professor of history at Yale University
Bud Goodall	Grad.	Speech	Professor of communication at Arizona State University
William A. Graham	1966		Former dean of Harvard Divinity School
James Haar	Grad.	Musicology	W.R. Kenan Jr. Professor Emeritus of Music at the University of North Carolina at Chapel Hill
James N. Hardin Jr.	1964, 1967	German literature	Distinguished professor at the University of South Carolina
Joseph A. Helpern	Grad.	Neuroscience and Radiology	Professor emeritus at the Medical University of South Carolina
Peter Blair Henry	1991	Economics	Dean of New York University Stern School of Business
Robert Hobbs	Grad.	Art history	Professor of art at Virginia Commonwealth University
C. Hugh Holman	Grad.	English	Professor of English and provost at University of North Carolina at Chapel Hill
E. Philip Howrey	Grad.	Economics	Professor of economics at University of Michigan
Rafat Hussain	Grad.	Public health	Deputy head of the School of Rural Medicine at the University of New England
John D. Kasarda	1971	Sociology	Director, Frank Hawkins Kenan Institute of Private Enterprise, Kenan-Flagler Business School, University of North Carolina at Chapel Hill; developer of the aerotropolis concept
Jack Knight	1974 / Grad.	English & religious studies / law	Professor at Duke University School of Law
Kevin M. Kruse	1994	History	Professor at Princeton University; member of the Society of American Historians
E. Christian Kopff	Grad.	Classics	Director of the Center for Western Civilization, and associate director of the honors program at the University of Colorado Boulder
Christina Kramer	Grad.	Slavic languages and literature	Professor of Slavic and Balkan languages at University of Toronto
Kenneth Margerison	1967	History	Professor of history at Texas State University
Leo Moser	Grad.	Mathematics	Professor of mathematics at University of Alberta
Charles Nam	Grad.	Sociology	Professor of sociology at Florida State University
Sharlotte Neely	Grad.	Anthropology	Professor emerita of Anthropology at Northern Kentucky University
Kai Nielsen	1949		Professor of philosophy at Concordia University
Kellis Parker	1964	Law	Professor at Columbia Law School
Arthur F. Raper	1924 / Grad.	Sociology	Professor at Agnes Scott College
Dwijendra Kumar Ray-Chaudhuri	Grad.	Mathematics	Professor of mathematics at Ohio State University
D. W. Robertson Jr.	1935 / Grad.	English	Professor of medieval English at Princeton University
Caryl Rusbult	Grad.	Psychology	Professor of psychology at Vrije Universiteit
Douglas A. Shackelford	1980		Dean of the UNC Kenan–Flagler Business School
Scott Silliman	1965 / Grad.	Philosophy / law	Professor of the practice of law at Duke Law School
Susanne Sreedhar	Grad.	Philosophy	Assistant professor of philosophy at Boston University
Carol Miller Swain	Grad.	Political science	Professor of law at Vanderbilt Law School
Valerie Tiberius	Grad.	Philosophy	Professor of philosophy at University of Minnesota
Greg Turk	Grad.	Computer science	Professor of computer science at Georgia Institute of Technology
Bruce Waller	Grad.	Philosophy	Professor of philosophy at Youngstown State University
Odd Arne Westad	Grad.	History	Professor of international history at the London School of Economics
Ross T. Whitaker	Grad.	Computer science	Director of the University of Utah School of Computing
Walter Lee Williams	Grad.	History	Professor of anthropology, history, and gender studies at the University of Southern California; former FBI Ten Most Wanted Fugitive; arrested for sexual acts with underage boys and possession of erotic paraphernalias related to child pornography
C. Vann Woodward	Grad.	History	Sterling Professor of History at Yale and Professor of History at Johns Hopkins University, recipient of Pulitzer Prize for History

== Arts and literature ==
=== Artists ===
Name	Class	Major	Notability
Richard Adler	1943	Dramatic art	Composer and lyricist
Bill Bamberger	1979	American studies	Documentary photographer
Richard Kern	1977	Art	Photographer
Ben Long	1967	Did not graduate	Artist
Benjamin Forrest Williams	1949	Art history	Artist and art curator

=== Playwrights ===
Name	Class	Major	Notability
Paul Green	1921	Dramatic art	Playwright and Pulitzer Prize winner
Kermit Hunter	Grad.	Dramatic art / English	Playwright
Amon Liner	1965	Dramatic art	Poet and playwright

=== Poets ===
Name	Class	Major	Notability
Edgar Bowers	1950		Poet
Hayden Carruth	1943	Journalism	Poet and winner of the National Book Award
Cid Corman			Poet and translator
Lawrence Ferlinghetti	1941	Journalism	Poet and publisher
Kerri French	2003	English	Poet
Donald Justice	Grad.	English	Poet
Amon Liner	1965	Dramatic art	Poet and playwright
William Matthews	Grad.	English	Poet
Michael McFee	1976 / Grad.	English	Poet
Joanna Pearson	2002	English	Poet, novelist, and short-story writer
Michael Rothenberg	1973	English	Poet and editor

=== Writers ===
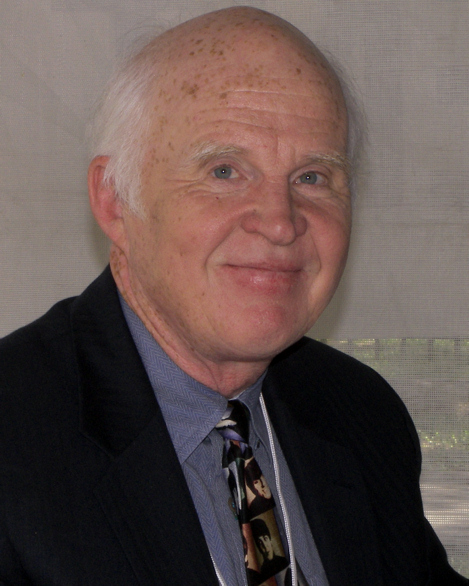
Taylor Branch

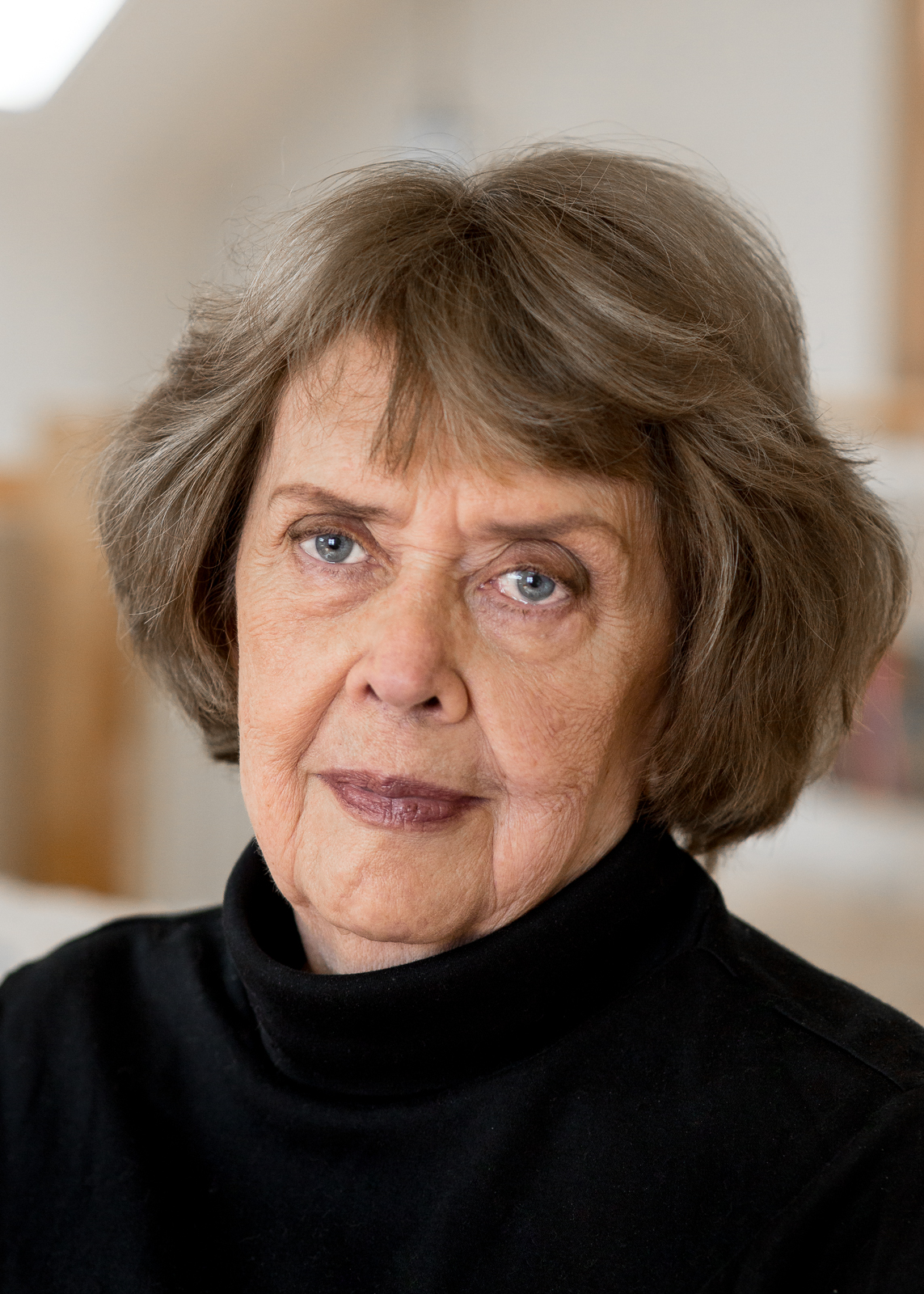
Gail Godwin

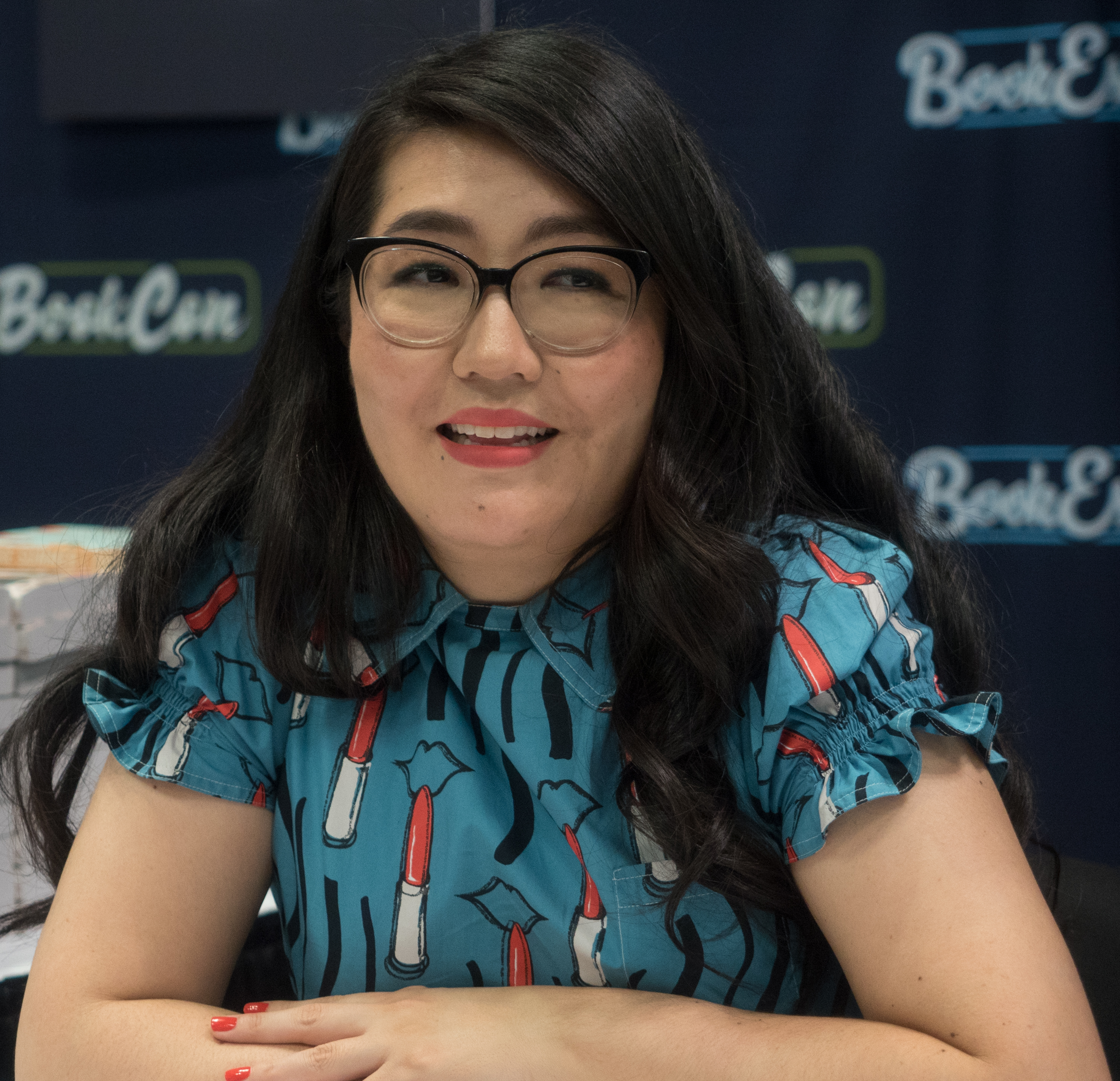
Jenny Han

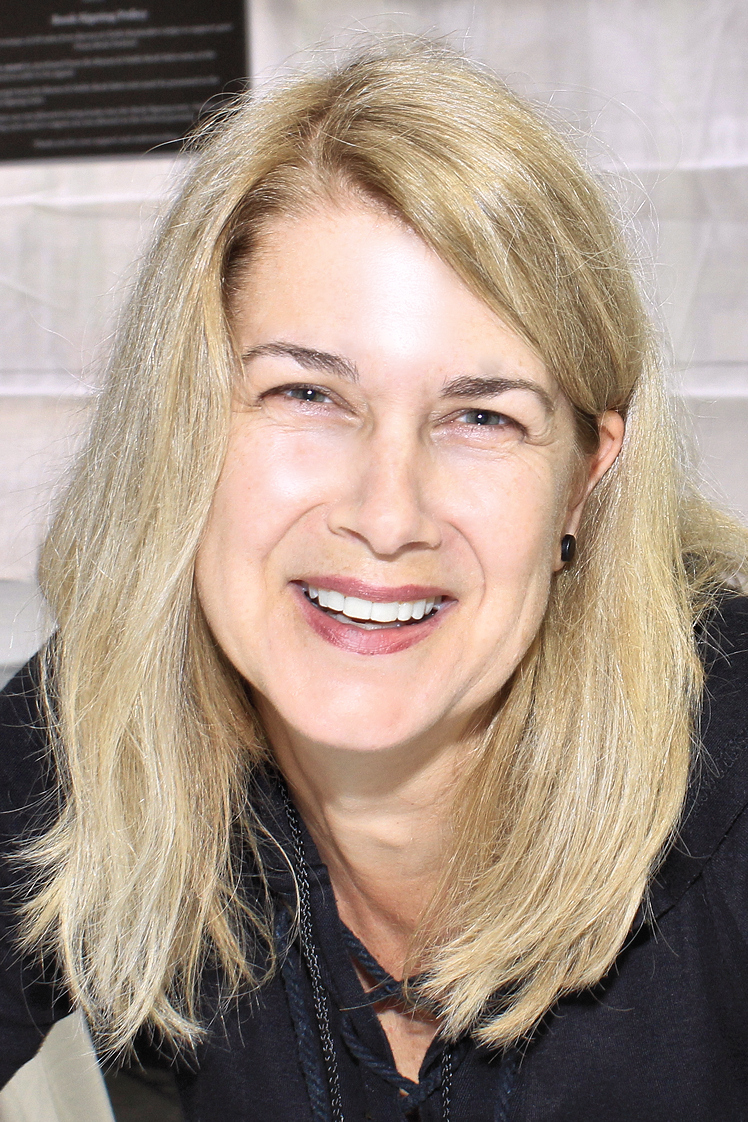
Lydia Millet

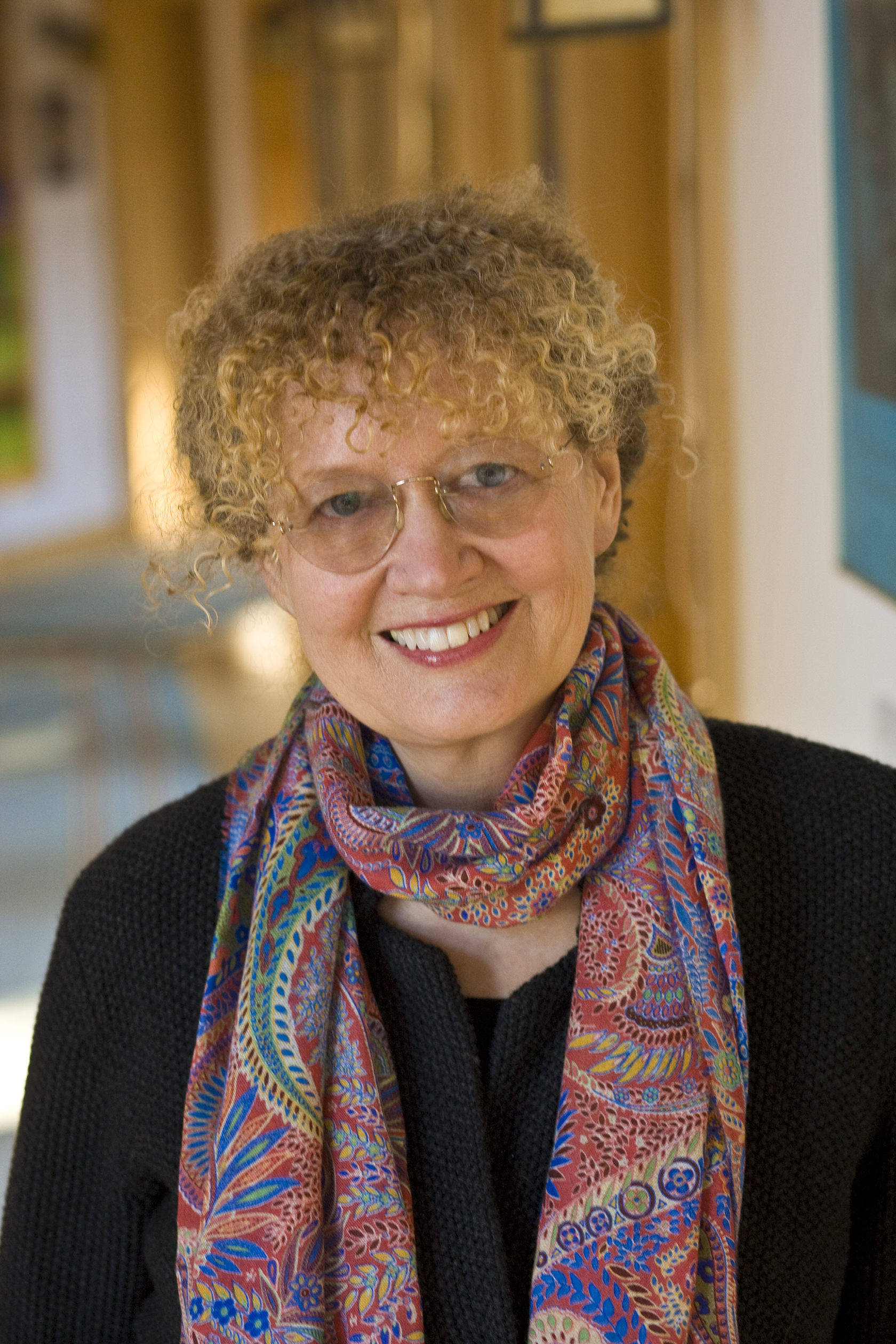
Mary Pope Osborne

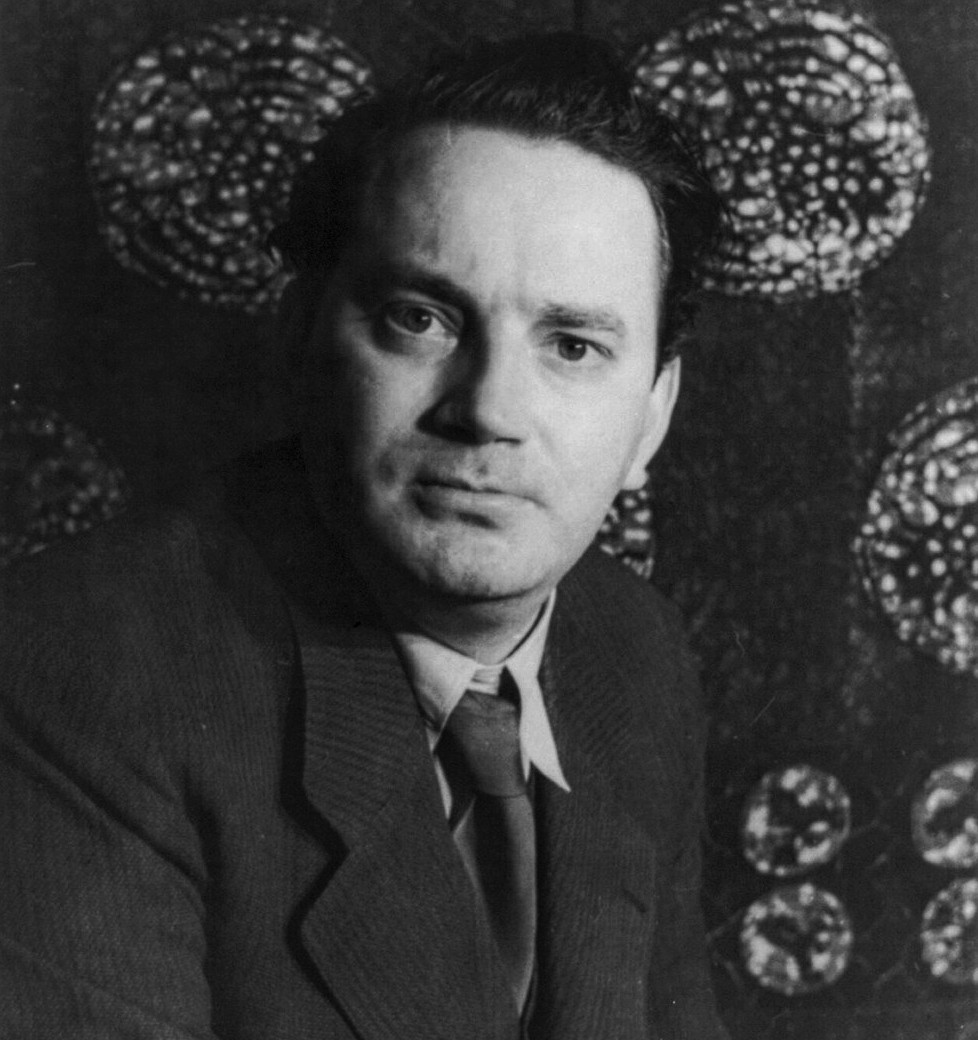
Thomas Wolfe

Name	Class	Major	Notability
Daphne Athas	1943	Arts & sciences	Writer
Russell Banks	1967	English	Novelist and poet
Doris Betts			Author
Brian Blanchfield			Essayist and poet
Will Blythe	1979	English	Writer and author
Taylor Branch	1968		Author and historian
Poppy Z. Brite			Novelist
Don Brown	1983	Political science	Novelist and author
Blake Crouch	2000	English, creative writing	Novelist
Tracy Deonn	2008		Novelist
Sarah Dessen	1993	English	Writer and author
Clyde Edgerton	1966 / Grad.	English	Novelist
L. M. Elliott	Grad.	Journalism	Young adult novelist
Thomas Fleming	Grad.	Classics	Writer and founding editor of neo-confederate journal Southern Partisan
Shelby Foote	1992	Honorary	Historian and novelist
Ben Fountain	1980	English	Writer and author
Charles Frazier	1973		Novelist
Kaye Gibbons	1984		Novelist
Gail Godwin	1960	Journalism	Novelist
Jenny Han	2002		Writer
Randall Kenan	1985	English	Writer
Mur Lafferty		English	Novelist
Armistead Maupin	1966	English	Novelist
Richard McKenna	1956	Arts & sciences	Novelist
Lydia Millet	1990	Interdisciplinary studies	Novelist
Joseph Mitchell			Writer for The New Yorker
Mary Lambeth Moore			Writer and podcaster
Lawrence Naumoff	1969	Arts & sciences	Novelist
Thuc Doan Nguyen		Public policy & Interdisciplinary studies	Essayist and screenwriter
Jenny Offill			Novelist
Mary Pope Osborne	1971	Religious studies	Author
Walker Percy	1937	Arts & sciences	Novelist
Charles F. Price	Grad.	Urban planning	Novelist
James Reston Jr.	1963	Philosophy	Writer and journalist
Robert Spencer	Grad.	Religious studies	Author and blogger, known for critiques of Islam and research of Islamic terrorism
Richard G. Stern	1947		Novelist
Melanie Sumner	1986	Religious studies	Novelist
Bryan Tucker	1993	Journalism	Head writer for Saturday Night Live
Rysa Walker	Grad.	Political science	Novelist
Daniel Wallace	2008	English	Novelist and teacher
Brandon Wilson	1973	Theatre, radio, television & motion pictures	Author and explorer
Thomas Wolfe	1920	Arts & sciences	Novelist
C. Vann Woodward	Grad.	History	Author, historian, winner of Pulitzer Prize for History

=== Other ===
Name	Class	Major	Notability
Charles M. Atkinson	Ph.D	Music	Musicologist
Watson Brown	Grad.	City Planning	Photographer
Brent Glass	Grad.	History	Director of the Smithsonian National Museum of American History
Alexander Julian	1969		Fashion designer
Paul R. Laird	Grad.	Music	Musicologist
Claude McKinney	1951	painting and design	Chief contributor to the design of Research Triangle Park
Anne-Imelda Radice	Ph.D. 1976	Art History	Art historian and museum director

== Business ==
Name	Class	Major	Notability
John Allison	1971	Business administration	Former CEO and president of Cato Institute; former chairman of BB&T Corporation/Branch Banking & Trust Co
Robert J. Bach	1984	Economics	Business executive; former president of the Entertainment & Devices Division at Microsoft
Eduardo Belmont Anderson		Business administration	Peruvian billionaire, owner of Belcorp
Caleb Bradham	1890		Pharmacist and inventor of Pepsi-Cola, president of Pepsi-Cola Company
Michele Buck	1987	Business administration	President and CEO of the Hershey Company
Julian Carr	1860s		Industrialist; Carrboro, North Carolina named for him
Max C. Chapman	1966	Economics	Former president and CEO of Kidder, Peabody & Co
Ned Davis		French	Founder of Ned Davis Research
Warren Grice Elliott	1867		President of Atlantic Coast Line Railroad
David Gardner	1988	English	Co-founder of The Motley Fool
Peaches Golding	1976	Biology	High Sheriff of Bristol, England, 2010–11
Peter Grauer	1968	English	Chairman of Bloomberg L.P.
Bowman Gray Sr.	1890	Did not graduate	Former president and chairman of R.J. Reynolds
J. Frank Harrison III	1977	Business administration	CEO of Coca-Cola Bottling Co. Consolidated
William B. Harrison Jr.	1966	Economics	Former CEO and chairman of JPMorgan Chase
George Watts Hill	1922 / Grad.	Commerce / law	Banker and philanthropist
John Sprunt Hill	1889	Philosophy	Banker and philanthropist
Walter E. Hussman Jr.	1969	Journalism	Publisher of the Arkansas Democrat-Gazette
Richard "Dick" Jenrette	1951		Founder of the Wall Street firm Donaldson, Lufkin & Jenrette and former chairman and CEO of The Equitable
William Johnson	Grad.	Law	President and CEO of Tennessee Valley Authority
Jason Kilar	1993	Journalism / business administration	Former CEO of WarnerMedia; former CEO of Hulu
Paul Kolton	1944	Journalism	Former chairman of the American Stock Exchange
Sallie Krawcheck	1987	Journalism	CEO and co-founder, Ellevest; former chairman and CEO of Citigroup Global Wealth Management; former CFO of Citigroup Inc.
Howard R. Levine	1981	Business administration	Former chairman of the board and CEO of Family Dollar
Scott Livengood	1974	Industrial relations	Owner and CEO of Dewey's Bakers; former CEO of Krispy Kreme
Tristan Louis	1993	Journalism / Political Science	CEO of Casebook PBC
John T. Lupton II		Business administration	President of JTL Corporation, one-time largest Coca-Cola's bottler in U.S.
Frank J. Manheim	1932	History, French Literature	Partner, Lehman Brothers; influential in the global success of Hertz Corp.; director of 20 US corporations; author
Hugh McColl	1957	Business administration	Former CEO of Bank of America
John Medlin	1956	Business administration	Former CEO of Wachovia
Allen B. Morgan Jr.	1965	History	Founder and former CEO of Morgan Keegan & Company
Gary Parr	1979	Business administration	Vice chairman of Lazard
Mercer "Merce" Reynolds III	1967	Business administration	Finance chair of U.S. President George W. Bush's 2004 re-election campaign and a U.S. ambassador to Switzerland and Liechtenstein
Chuck Robbins	1987	Mathematical sciences	CEO of Cisco Systems
Julian Robertson	1955	Business administration	Founded the investment firm Tiger Management Corp.
William H. Rogers Jr.		Business administration	Chairman and CEO of SunTrust Banks
Bill Ruger	1940	Did not graduate	Founded firearms manufacturer Sturm, Ruger
Pete Rummell	1967	Chemistry / English literature	Former Chairman and CEO of Walt Disney Imagineering and St. Joe Company
John Skipper	1978	English literature	Executive chairman of Perform Group and former president of ESPN
Marcus G. Smith	Did not graduate	Journalism	CEO of Speedway Motorsports, Inc.
Mitchell S. Steir	1977	Economics	Chairman and CEO of Studley, Inc.
Ken Thompson	1973	American studies	Former chairman and CEO of Wachovia
Robert L. Tillman	1967		Former Lowe's CEO
James M. Wells III			CEO of SunTrust Banks 2007–2011

== Entertainment and broadcasting ==
=== Actors ===
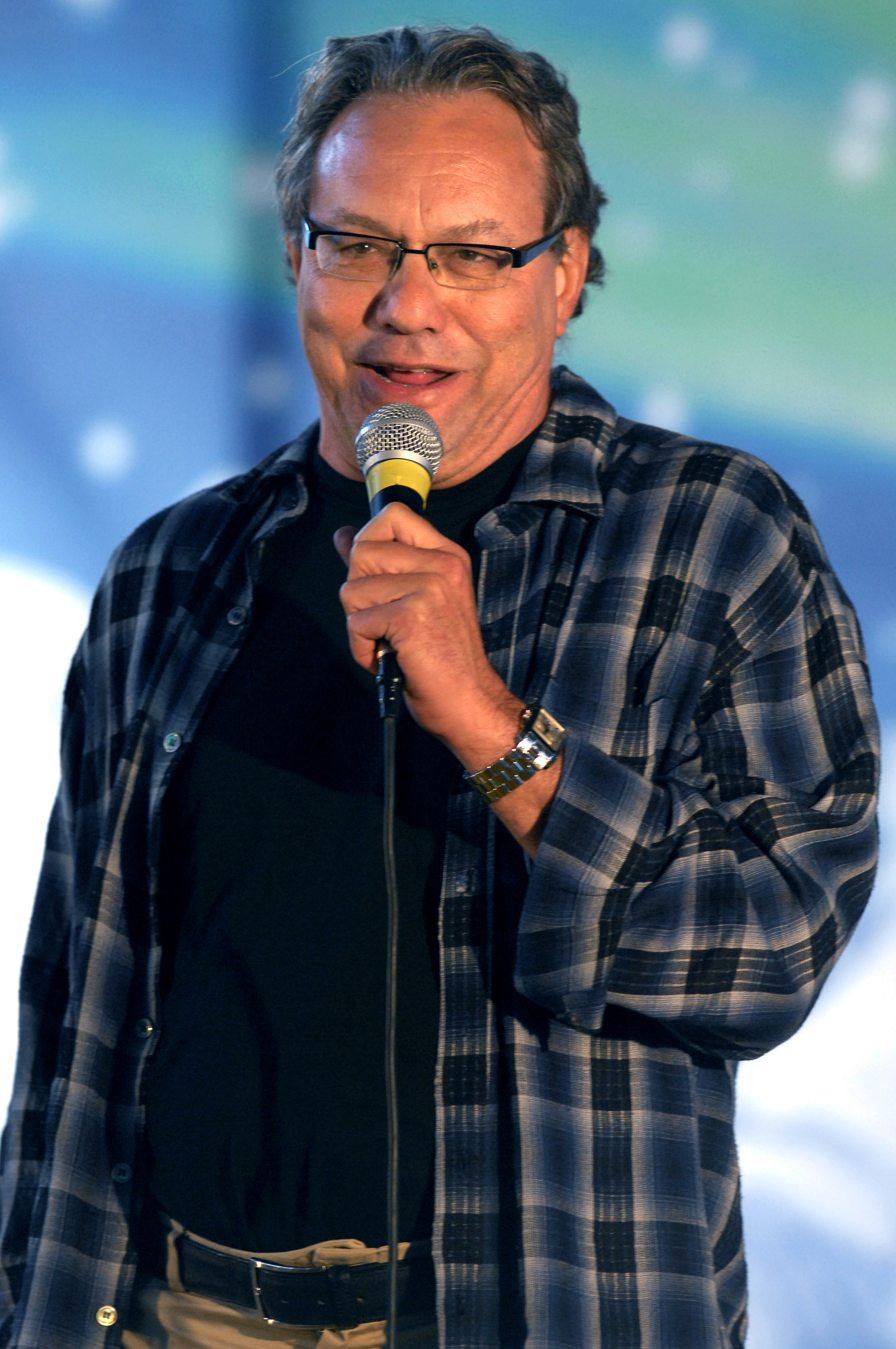
Lewis Black

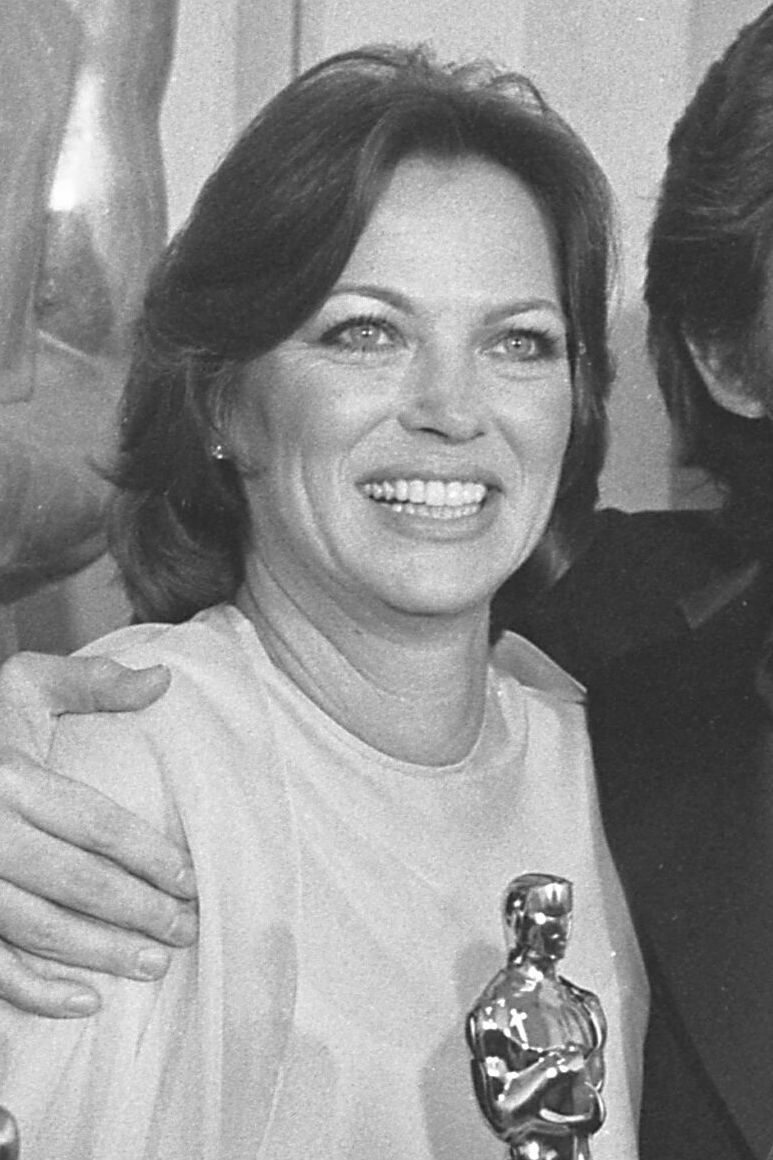
Louise Fletcher

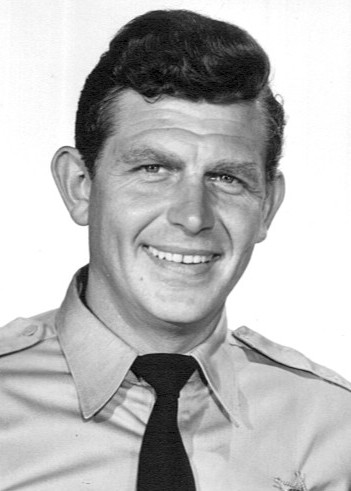
Andy Griffith

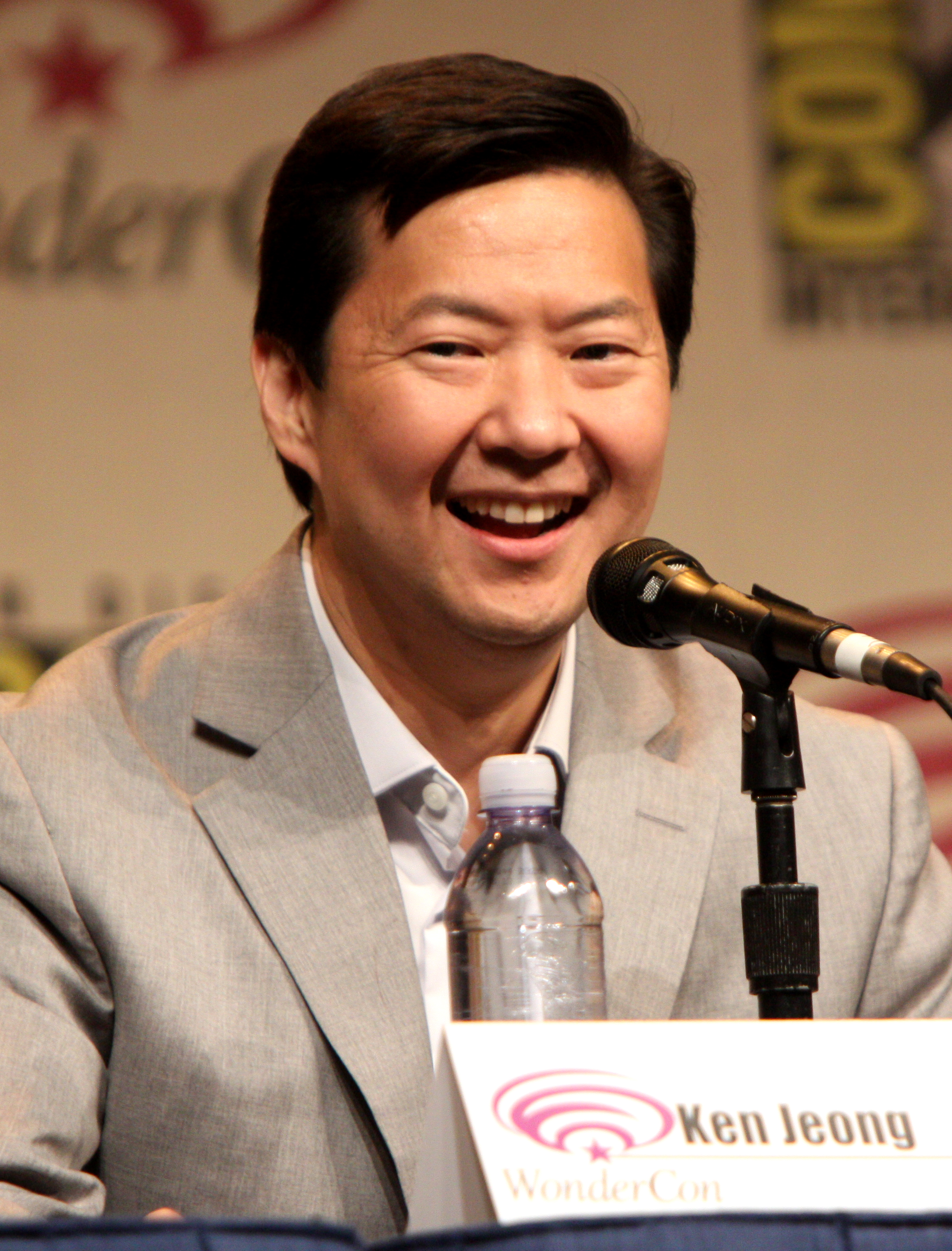
Ken Jeong

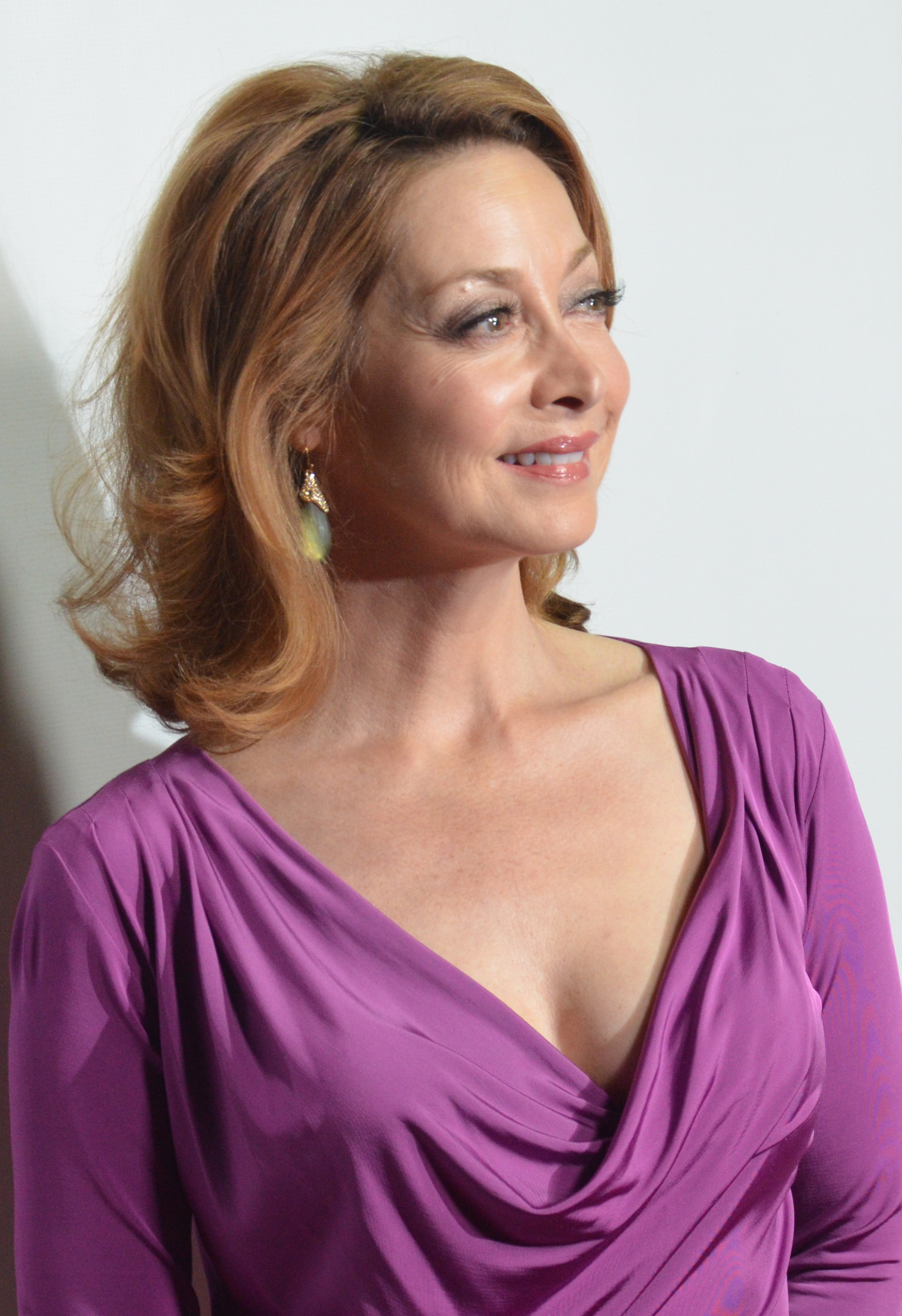
Sharon Lawrence

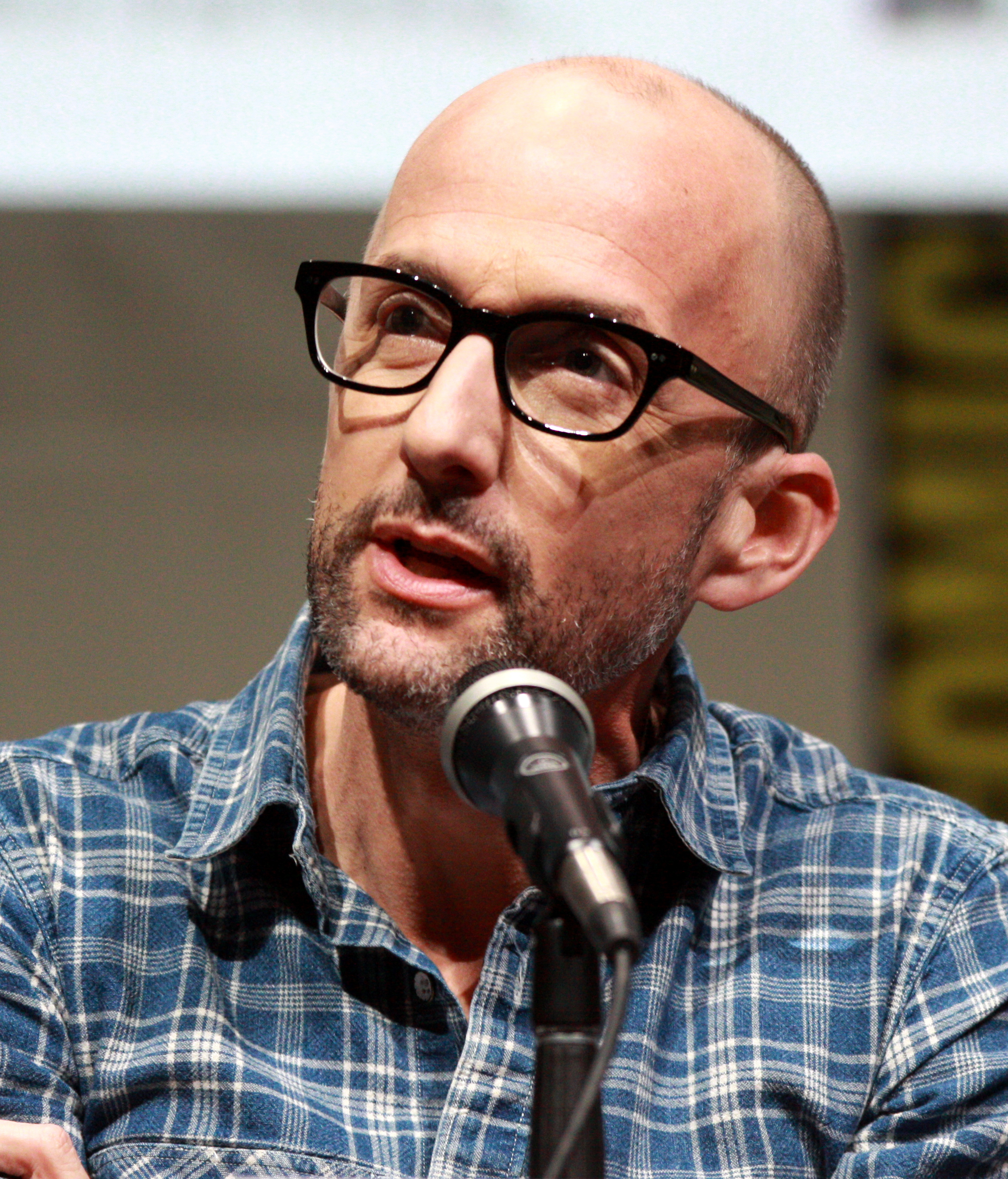
Jim Rash

Name	Class	Major	Notability
Whit Bissell	1932	Arts & sciences	Actor
Lewis Black	1970	Dramatic Art	Actor and stand-up comedian
Wyatt Cenac	1994	Did not graduate	Comedian, actor producer, and writer
Kelen Coleman	2006	Communications	Actress
Dan Cortese	1990	Radio, television and motion picture	Actor and TV personality
Billy Crudup	1990	Speech	Actor
Michael Cumpsty	1982 / Grad.	English / dramatic art	Actor
Melissa Claire Egan	2003	Dramatic art	Soap opera actress
Louise Fletcher	1957	Dramatic art	Academy Award-winning actress
John Forsythe	1948		Actor
Rick Fox	1994	Radio, television and motion picture	Actor; former professional basketball player
Ed Grady		Theater / English	Actor
Andy Griffith	1949	Dramatic art	Actor, comedian, writer, and producer
George Grizzard	1949	Radio, television and motion picture	Actor
Anne Haney	1956	Radio, television and motion picture	Actress
Mamrie Hart		Dramatic art	Comedian, actress, writer, and performer
Liza Huber			Soap opera actress; daughter of Susan Lucci
Ken Jeong	Grad.	Medicine	Actor and comedian
Ben Jones			Actor; former U.S. representative from Georgia
Darwin Joston	1960	Dramatic art	Actor
Kay Kyser	1928	Economics	Bandleader, radio personality, and movie actor
Sharon Lawrence	1983	Journalism	Emmy Award-nominated actress
Michael Louden	1986	Did not graduate	Actor
Jane McNeill		Journalism	Actress
Nolan North	1992	Journalism	Actor, voice actor
Jack Palance		Did not graduate	Actor
Jim Rash	1994	Radio, television and motion picture	Actor and Oscar-winning screenwriter
Adam Reed	1992		Voice actor, writer, and producer
Jeff Richards	1998	Communications	Actor and comedian
Randolph Scott		Did not graduate	Actor
Nick Searcy		English	Actor
Lionel Stander		Did not graduate	Actor
Christine White		English	Actress

=== Broadcasters ===
Name	Class	Major	Notability
Andrew Ballen	1995	Political science	TV personality, producer, A&R executive in Mainland China
Howie Carr	1973	Journalism	Radio personality
Rick Dees	1972	Radio, television and motion picture	Radio personality and composer of novelty song "Disco Duck"
Barry Farber	1952	Journalism	Conservative radio talk show host
Ashlan Gorse	2002	Journalism	E! television network personality
Kit Hoover	1992	Speech	Television personality
Bomani Jones	Grad.	Economics	Radio and television personality
Chris Matthews	Grad.	Did not graduate	Television personality and speechwriter for President Carter
Elyse Ribbons	2003	Asian Studies	Actress, writer and popular radio host on CRI
Rick Sebak	1975	English	WQED personality
David Venable	1987	Radio, television and motion picture	Host on QVC and cookbook author
Eboni K. Williams		Communications & African-American studies	Television host, lawyer

=== Musicians ===
Name	Class	Major	Notability
Richard Adler	1943		Composer, lyricist, writer and producer (Broadway, TV); Songwriters Hall of Fame; UNC Lifetime Achievement Award
Emanuel Ayvas	2005		Lead singer and guitarist for Emanuel and the Fear
Laura Ballance	1990	Anthropology	Bassist in the rock band Superchunk and co-founder of Merge Records
David Burris	1987	Political Science	Guitarist in the rock bands Jolene and The Veldt
Meg Christian	1968	Music	Singer and founder of lesbian record company Olivia
Anoop Desai	2008	Political science / American studies	American Idol 6th place finalist, singer
Don Dixon			Musician, songwriter, member of Arrogance, and producer of bands such as R.E.M.
Lisa Furukawa	1999	Music / Asian studies	Pianist, singer, and songwriter
George Hamilton			Country music singer
Wayne Handy	1962	Business administration	Rockabilly singer
Brendan James	2002	Communications	Singer and songwriter
Kay Kyser	1928	Economics	Bandleader, radio personality, and movie actor
Lachi	2005	Economics, management and society	Alternative rock artist, author
Tift Merritt	2000		Singer
Oliver	1967	Radio, television and motion picture	Pop singer
David Olney		Did not graduate	Musician
Chase Rice	2009		Country music singer and songwriter
Scott Routenberg	2001	Music and communications	Composer
Rick Seibold	2005		Singer, songwriter, and producer
Bud Shank	1947		Musician

=== Writers, producers, directors ===
Name	Class	Major	Notability
John Altschuler	1985	Economics and anthropology	TV and film writer and producer, co-writer of Blades of Glory, five-time Emmy-nominated for writing and producing Silicon Valley and King of the Hill
David Burris	1987	Political science	TV and film producer, writer, director; executive producer of Survivor; director of The World Made Straight; writer of Good vs. Evil
Norwood Cheek	1990	French	Director of music videos and documentaries
Grady Cooper	1987	English	Emmy-nominated film editor
Andy Griffith	1949	Dramatic art	Actor, comedian, writer, and producer
Brian Hargrove	1977	Dramatic art	TV writer and producer
Jeffrey Hayden	1948?		Stage and TV director and writer; director of Omnibus and episodes of The Andy Griffith Show, Leave it to Beaver, Route 66, and Mannix
Rachael Horovitz	1984		Film and television producer, Moneyball, Grey Gardens, and Patrick Melrose
Robert Klane	1963		Screenwriter, Where's Poppa? and Weekend at Bernie's
Dave Krinsky	1985	Economics	TV and film writer and producer, co-writer of Blades of Glory, five-time Emmy-nominated for writing and producing Silicon Valley and King of the Hill
Josh Pate	1992	English	Screenwriter, director and producer
Larry Peerce	1951		Film and television director
Michael Piller	1970	Radio, television and motion picture	Writer and co-creator of Star Trek: Deep Space Nine and Star Trek: Voyager
Peyton Reed	1986	Radio, television and motion picture	Director of Bring It On, The Break-Up, Down With Love, and Ant-Man
Scott Sanders	1991	Radio, television and motion picture	Screenwriter and director; director of Black Dynamite, Thick as Thieves
John Schultz	1985	Business	Film director of Drive Me Crazy, Like Mike, Aliens in the Attic
Hughes Winborne	1975	History	Academy Award-winning film editor

=== Other ===
Name	Class	Major	
James D. Bissell	Grad.	Theater	Academy Award-nominated production designer
Jeff MacNelly	`1970	Did not graduate	Three-time winner of the Pulitzer Prize for political cartooning; creator of Shoe and Pluggers comic strips
Caleb Pressley	2014	Communications	Blogger and podcaster at Barstool Sports

== Journalism ==
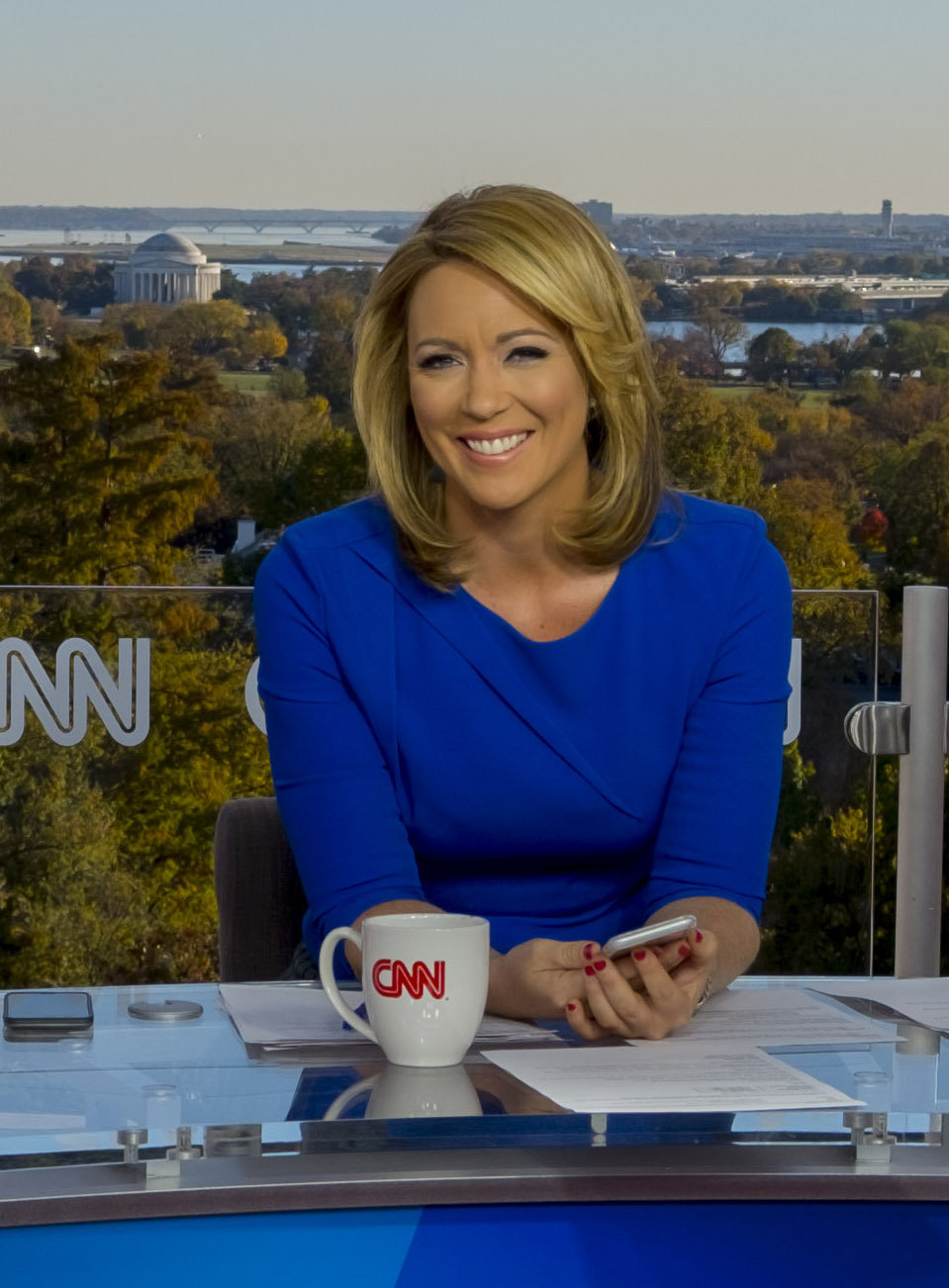
Brooke Baldwin

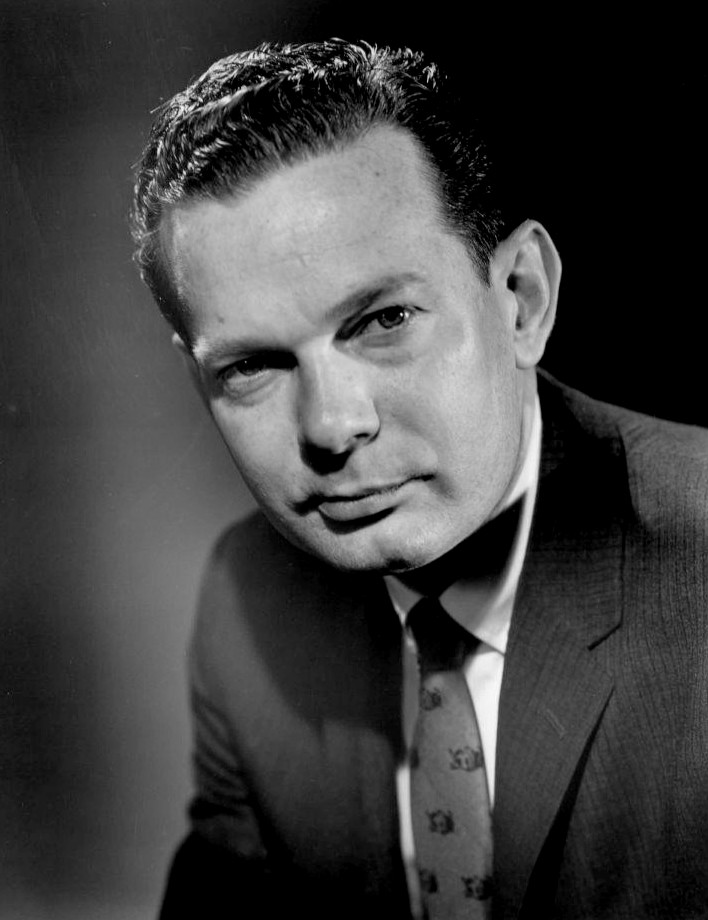
David Brinkley

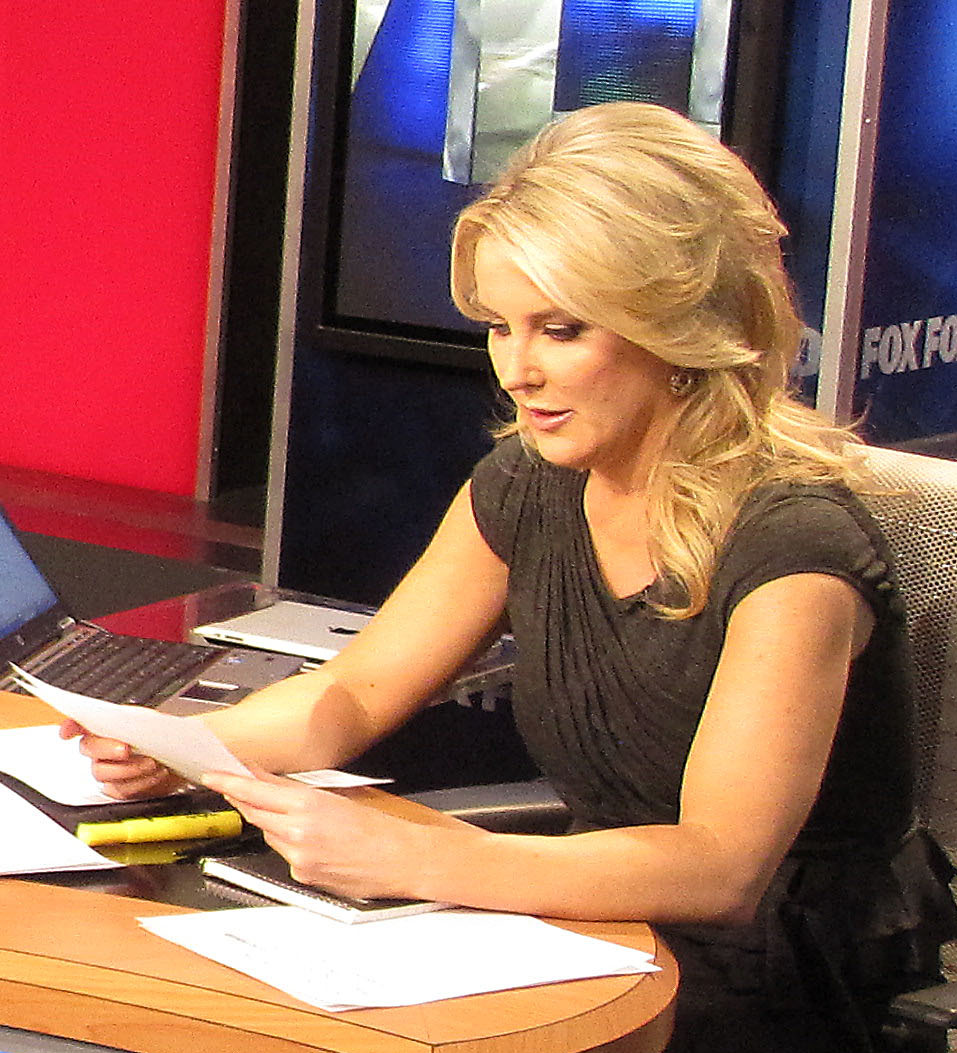
Heather Childers

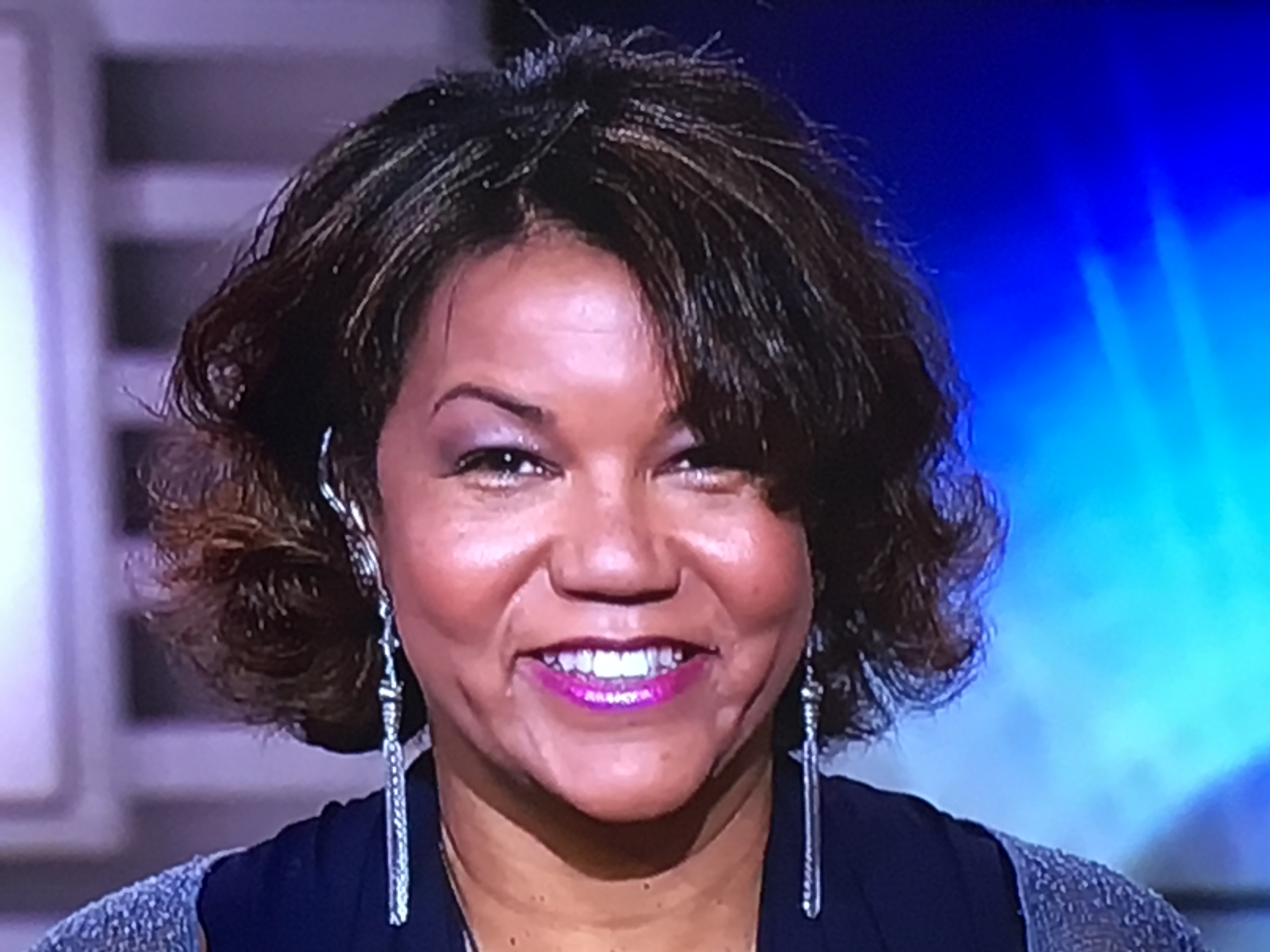
Helene Cooper

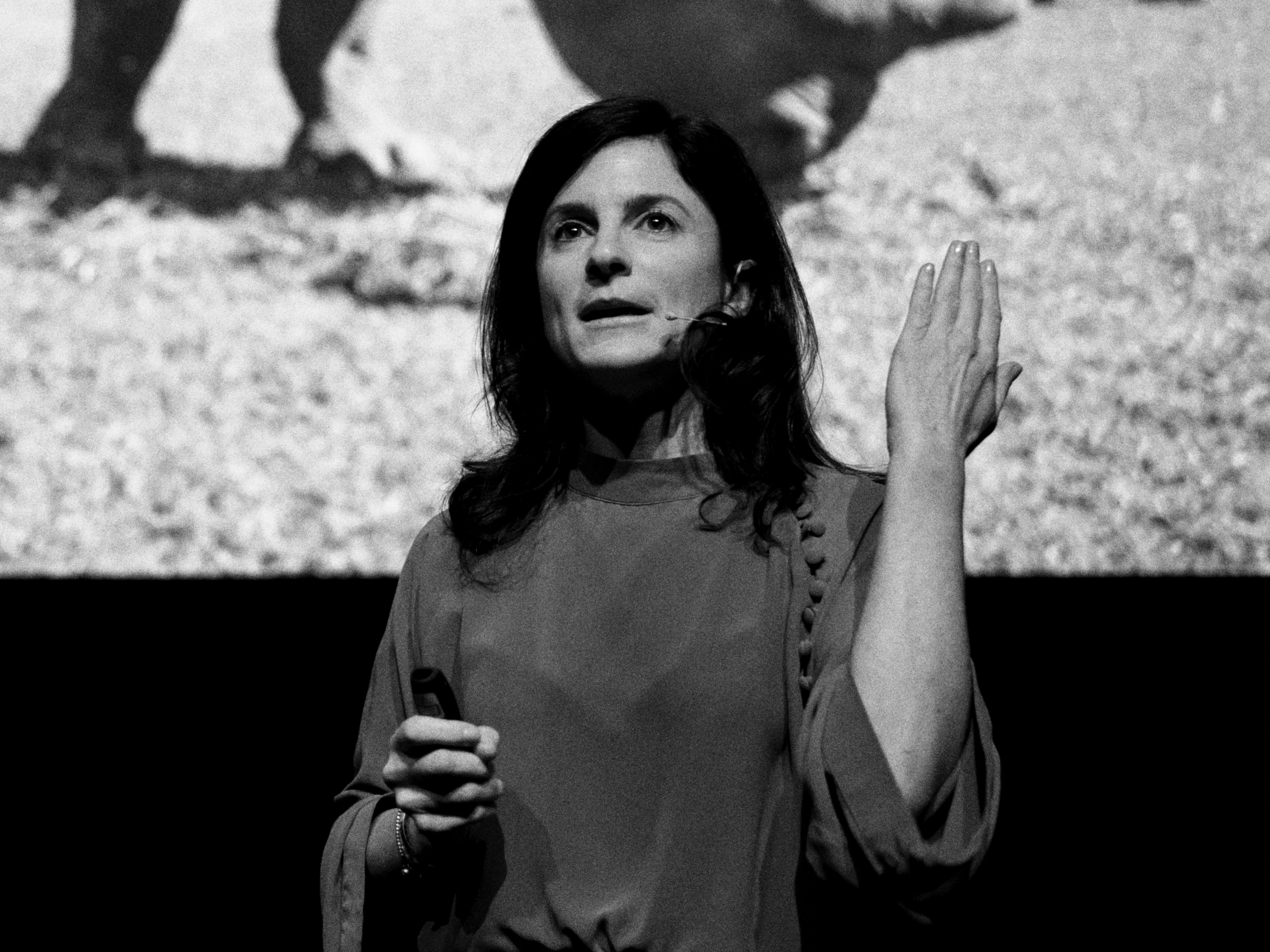
Ami Vitale

Name	Class	Major	Notability
Dan Ashley	1985	English and speech communication	Television news anchor, columnist, commentator
Brooke Baldwin	2001	Journalism and Spanish	Television journalist and anchor for CNN
Jack Betts	1968	Journalism	Editor and columnist for the Charlotte Observer
Furman Bisher	1938	Journalism	Sportswriter and editor
Marty Brennaman	1965	Radio, television and motion picture	Sportscaster
David Brinkley	–	Did not graduate	Television journalist
Joel Brinkley			Journalist with The New York Times
Pamela Brown	2006	Journalism	Television journalist, CNN
Frank Bruni	1986	English	Restaurant critic and op-ed columnist for The New York Times
Heather Childers	1991	English	On-air personality for Fox News Channel
Helene Cooper	1987	Journalism	New York Times correspondent
Laurie Dhue	1990	Political science	TV news anchor, reporter
Woody Durham	1963	Radio, television and motion picture	Sportscaster and voice of the Tar Heels
Joseph Egemonye	1970	Journalism	Journalist; co-founder of the Winston-Salem Chronicle
Samuel T. Francis	Grad.	History	Syndicated conservative columnist
Molly Sullivan French	2002	Communications	Team reporter for the Las Vegas Raiders
Peter Gammons	1967		Sportswriter and member of the Baseball Hall of Fame
Maddie Gardner		Journalism	News anchor and reporter for WFMY-TV
Gail Gregg	1975	Journalism	Artist, photographer and journalist
Carl Kasell	1956		NPR newscaster
Chavi Khanna Koneru	2006	Journalism	Journalist, lawyer, and executive director and co-founder of North Carolina Asian Americans Together (NCAAT)
Charles Kuralt	1965	Radio, television and motion picture	Journalist, won 13 Emmys and three Peabody Awards for broadcast journalism
Jim Lampley	1971	English	Sportscaster
Tristan Louis	1993	Journalism	Author, journalist, and entrepreneur
Monica Malpass	1983	Journalism	News anchor and reporter for WPVI
John Manuel			Author; editor-in-chief of Baseball America
Philip Meyer	Grad.	Political science	Journalist and professor of journalism
Mick Mixon	1980	Radio, television and motion picture	Sportscaster and voice of the Carolina Panthers
Roger Mudd	Grad.	History	Journalist and broadcaster
Rob Nelson	2000	Journalism	Television journalist
Karen L. Parker	1965	Journalism	First African-American female undergraduate; journalist for the Winston-Salem Journal
Sophie Pyle	2009	Journalism	New media entrepreneur
Don Robertson	1950	Communication	Sportscaster
Robert Ruark	1935	Journalism	Syndicated columnist and author
Reed Sarratt	1937	Journalism	Executive director of the Southern Education Reporting Service and the Southern Newspaper Publishers Association
Stuart Scott	1987	Radio, television and motion picture	Sportscaster
Lloyd Shearer	1936	English	Author of "Walter Scott's Personality Parade" column in Parade
James Surowiecki	1988	History	Journalist for The New Yorker; author of The Wisdom of Crowds
David Swerdlick	Grad.	Law	Journalist for Washington Post
Kayla Tausche	2008	Journalism	Reporter for CNBC
Ami Vitale	1994	International studies	Photographer and journalist
Tom Wicker	1948	Journalism	Author and New York Times journalist
Perry Deane Young	1993	Journalism	Journalist and author

=== Pulitzer Prize winners ===
Name	Class	Major	Notability
Joel Brinkley	1975	Journalism	Pulitzer Prize winner for International Reporting
W. Horace Carter	1949	Journalism	Pulitzer Prize winner for public service, owner and publisher of the Tabor City Tribune
Lenoir Chambers	1914		Pulitzer Prize winner for editorial writing; editor of The Virginian-Pilot
Sarah Cohen	1979	Economics	Pulitzer Prize winner for investigative reporting
Nikole Hannah-Jones	Grad.	Journalism	Pulitzer Prize winner for commentary
Jeff MacNelly			Three-time Pulitzer Prize winner for editorial cartoons
Gene Roberts	1954	Journalism	Pulitzer Prize–winning author; former executive editor of The Philadelphia Inquirer; former managing editor of The New York Times; professor of journalism at the University of Maryland
Vermont C. Royster	1935	Journalism	Pulitzer Prize winner for editorial writing; former editor of The Wall Street Journal
Emily Steel	2005	Journalism	Pulitzer Prize-winning New York Times reporter
Jim Yardley	1986	History	Pulitzer Prize-winning New York Times reporter
Jonathan Yardley	1961	English	Author and Pulitzer Prize-winning book critic for The Washington Post
Edwin Yoder	1956	English	Pulitzer Prize winner for editorial writing

== Politics and public life ==
=== President of the United States ===
Name	Class	Major	Notability
James K. Polk	1818 / Grad.		11th president of the United States

=== Vice president of the United States ===
Name	Class	Major	Notability
William R. King	1803		13th vice president of the United States

=== Governors and lieutenant governors ===
Name	Class	Major	Notability
Charles B. Aycock	1880	Oratory and essay writing	Former governor of North Carolina and leader of the 1898 Wilmington Coup
John Branch	1801	Arts & sciences	Former governor of and U.S. senator from North Carolina, secretary of the Navy
Aaron V. Brown	1814		Former governor of and U.S. representative from Tennessee; postmaster general
Tod Robinson Caldwell	1840		19th-century governor of North Carolina
Gaston Caperton	1963	Business administration	Former governor of West Virginia
Elias Carr	1859		19th-century governor of North Carolina
Henry Toole Clark	1826 / Grad.		19th-century governor of North Carolina
Roy Cooper	1979 / Grad.	Psychology and political science / law	Former governor of North Carolina and former North Carolina attorney general
Steve Cowper	1960 / Grad.	History / law	Former governor of Alaska
Locke Craig	1880		Former governor of North Carolina
Walter Dalton	1971 / Grad.	Law	Former lieutenant governor of North Carolina
Mike Easley	1972	Political science	Former governor of North Carolina
John C. B. Ehringhaus	1902		Former governor of North Carolina
John Willis Ellis	1841		19th-century governor of North Carolina
Oliver Max Gardner	Grad.	Law	Former governor of North Carolina
William Alexander Graham	1824 / Grad.		19th-century US senator and governor of North Carolina; secretary of the Navy; vice-presidential candidate; CSA senator
Luther H. Hodges	1919		Former governor of North Carolina
Clyde R. Hoey	Grad.	Law	Former governor of North Carolina
James Holshouser	Grad.	Law	Former governor of North Carolina
Thomas Michael Holt		Did not graduate	19th-century governor of North Carolina
Jim Hunt	Grad.	Law	Former governor of North Carolina
William Walton Kitchin	Grad.	Law	Former governor of North Carolina
Charles Manly	1814		19th-century governor of North Carolina
Angus Wilton McLean	1892 / Grad.	Law	Former governor of North Carolina
William Miller		Did not graduate	19th-century governor of North Carolina
Dan K. Moore	1927 / Grad.	Law	Former governor of North Carolina, former justice of N.C. Supreme Court
John Motley Morehead	1817		19th-century governor of North Carolina
William Dunn Moseley	1818	Arts & sciences	First governor of the State of Florida
John Owen		Did not graduate	Former governor of North Carolina
Daniel Lindsay Russell		Did not graduate	19th-century governor of North Carolina
Terry Sanford	1939 / Grad.	Law	Former senator from and governor of North Carolina; president of Duke University
Alfred Moore Scales		Did not graduate	19th-century governor of North Carolina
Richard Dobbs Spaight Jr.	1815		19th-century governor of North Carolina, governor of Florida, and U.S. representative from North Carolina
David Lowry Swain		Did not graduate	19th-century governor of North Carolina
John Swainson	Grad.	Law	Former governor of Michigan
William B. Umstead	1916		Former governor of North Carolina, U.S. representative from North Carolina
Zebulon Baird Vance			Former governor of North Carolina
Warren Winslow			19th-century governor of North Carolina; U.S. representative from North Carolina

=== U.S. senators ===
Name	Class	Major	Notability
Thomas Hart Benton	–	Did not graduate/expelled	Former senator from Missouri
John Branch	1801		Former governor of and U.S. senator from North Carolina; secretary of the Navy
Thomas Lanier Clingman	1832		Former U.S. senator and U.S. representative from North Carolina
John Eaton	Grad.		Senator from Tennessee and secretary of war
John Edwards	Grad.	Law	Former U.S. senator from North Carolina; 2004 Democratic candidate for vice president; 2004 and 2008 Democratic primary candidate for presidential nomination
Samuel James Ervin Jr.	1917		Former senator from North Carolina
William Alexander Graham	1824 / Grad.		19th-century US senator and governor of North Carolina; secretary of the Navy; vice-presidential candidate, and CSA senator
William Henry Haywood Jr.	1819 / Grad.		Former senator from North Carolina
Willie Person Mangum	1815 / Grad.		Former senator from North Carolina
Alfred O. P. Nicholson	1827		Former senator from Tennessee
John Pool	1847		Former senator from North Carolina
Terry Sanford	1939 / Grad.	Law	Former senator from and governor of North Carolina; president of Duke University
William R. Webb	1867 / Grad.		Former senator from Tennessee
Paul Wellstone	1965 / Grad.	Political science	Former senator from Minnesota

=== U.S. representatives ===
Name	Class	Major	Notability
Charles Laban Abernethy	Grad.	Law	U.S. representative from North Carolina
Hugh Quincy Alexander	Grad.	Law	U.S. representative from North Carolina
Sydenham Benoni Alexander	1860		U.S. representative from North Carolina
Ike Franklin Andrews	1950 / Grad.	Business / law	U.S. representative from North Carolina
Thomas Samuel Ashe	1832		U.S. representative from North Carolina
Cass Ballenger	1948		U.S. representative from North Carolina
Michael D. Barnes	1965		U.S. representative from Maryland
Daniel Moreau Barringer	1826		U.S. representative from North Carolina
J. Daniel Bishop	1990		U.S. representative from North Carolina
James Jefferson Britt	Grad.	Law	U.S. representative from North Carolina
Robin Britt	1963 / Grad.	Law	U.S. representative from North Carolina
Aaron V. Brown	1814		Former U.S. representative from and governor of Tennessee; postmaster general
Jim Broyhill	1950	Business administration	U.S. representative from North Carolina
Alfred L. Bulwinkle	Grad.	Law	U.S. representative from North Carolina
Frank Ertel Carlyle			U.S. representative from North Carolina
Henry Selby Clark	1828		U.S. representative from North Carolina
J. Bayard Clark		Law	U.S. representative from North Carolina
Thomas Lanier Clingman	1832		U.S. representative from North Carolina
Howard Coble	Grad.	Law	U.S. representative from North Carolina
Jim Cooper	1975	History & economics	U.S. representative from Tennessee
Francis Burton Craige	1829 / Grad.		U.S. representative from North Carolina
William C. Cramer	1946		U.S. representative from Florida
William T. Crawford	Grad.	Law	U.S. representative from North Carolina
John Reeves Jones Daniel	1821 / Grad.		U.S. representative from North Carolina
Susan Davis	Grad.	Social work	U.S. representative from California
James C. Dobbin	1832		U.S. representative from North Carolina and secretary of the Navy
Richard Spaight Donnell	1839		U.S. representative from North Carolina
Joseph Wilson Ervin	1921		U.S. representative from North Carolina
Samuel James Ervin Jr.	1917		U.S. representative and senator from North Carolina
Alonzo Dillard Folger	1912 / Grad.	Law	U.S. representative from North Carolina
John Hamlin Folger	Grad.	Law	U.S. representative from North Carolina
Daniel Munroe Forney	1808		U.S. representative from North Carolina
Lawrence H. Fountain	1934 / Grad.	Law	U.S. representative from North Carolina
Virginia Foxx	1968 / Grad.	English / education	U.S. representative from North Carolina elected in 2004
Valerie Foushee	2008	African-American studies	U.S. representative from North Carolina elected in 2023
Hannibal Lafayette Godwin	Grad.	Law	U.S. representative from North Carolina
Gwen Graham	1984		U.S. representative from Florida
James Graham	1814		U.S. representative from North Carolina
V. Lamar Gudger	1940 / Grad.	Law	U.S. representative from North Carolina
William C. Hammer	Grad.	Law	U.S. representative from North Carolina
Micajah Thomas Hawkins	1807		U.S. representative from North Carolina
David N. Henderson	Grad.	Law	U.S. representative from North Carolina
John S. Henderson	1865	Law	U.S. representative from North Carolina
John Hill	1816		U.S. representative from North Carolina
Jeff Jackson	2009	Law (JD)	U.S. representative from North Carolina
Charles R. Jonas	1925 / Grad.	Law	U.S. representative from North Carolina
Ben Jones		Did not graduate	Former U.S. representative from Georgia and actor
Hamilton C. Jones	1906	Law	U.S. representative from North Carolina
William Carter Love	1806		Former U.S. representative from North Carolina
Allard Lowenstein	1949		Former U.S. representative from New York
Willie Person Mangum	1815 / Grad.		U.S. representative from North Carolina
John Y. Mason	1816		Former U.S. representative from Virginia; United States attorney general; secretary of the Navy
Mike McIntyre	1978 / Grad.	Political science / law	Former U.S. representative from North Carolina
Alex McMillan	1954	History	Former U.S. representative from North Carolina
Brad Miller	1975		Former U.S. representative from North Carolina
Anderson Mitchell	1821 / Grad.		Former U.S. representative from North Carolina
James Turner Morehead	1819		U.S. representative from North Carolina
Mick Mulvaney	Grad.	Law	U.S. representative from South Carolina
William H. Murfree			U.S. representative from North Carolina
Greg Murphy	1989 / Grad.	Medicine	U.S. representative from North Carolina
David Outlaw	1824		U.S. representative from North Carolina
Ebenezer Pettigrew			U.S. representative from North Carolina
David Price	1961	Arts & sciences	U.S. representative from North Carolina
George M. Pritchard	1907		U.S. representative from North Carolina
Abraham Rencher	1822 / Grad.	Law	U.S. representative from North Carolina
Sion Hart Rogers	1846 / Grad.		U.S. representative from North Carolina
Charlie Rose	Grad.	Law	U.S. representative from North Carolina
Deborah Ross	1990 / Grad.	Law	U.S. representative from North Carolina
Thomas Hart Ruffin			U.S. representative from North Carolina
Romulus Mitchell Saunders			U.S. representative from North Carolina
Samuel Tredwell Sawyer			U.S. representative from North Carolina
Charles Biddle Shepard			U.S. representative from North Carolina
William Crawford Sherrod			U.S. representative from Alabama
Francis Edwin Shober	1851 / Grad.		U.S. representative from North Carolina
Charles Manly Stedman	1861 / Grad.		U.S. representative from North Carolina
Walter Leak Steele	1844 / Grad.		U.S. representative from North Carolina
William B. Umstead	1916		Former governor of North Carolina; U.S. representative from North Carolina
Tim Valentine	Grad.	Law	U.S. representative from North Carolina
Matt Van Epps	Grad.	Public Administration	U.S. representative from Tennessee
Alfred Moore Waddell			U.S. representative from North Carolina
Hallett Sydney Ward	Grad.	Law	U.S. representative from North Carolina
Lindsay Carter Warren	1906 / Grad.	Law	U.S. representative from North Carolina
Mel Watt	1967	Business Administration	Former U.S. representative from North Carolina
Zebulon Weaver	Grad.	Law	U.S. representative from North Carolina
Edwin Y. Webb	Grad.	Law	U.S. representative from North Carolina
Lewis Williams	1808 / Grad.		U.S. representative from North Carolina
Warren Winslow	1827		19th-century governor of and U.S. representative from North Carolina
Bartlett Yancey			U.S. representative from North Carolina

=== U.S. cabinet members and other executive officers ===
Name	Class	Major	Notability
Claude Allen	1982	Political science	Director of the Domestic Policy Council for the George W. Bush administration
Melody Barnes	1986	History	Director of the Domestic Policy Council for the Obama administration
James Crawford Biggs	1893 / Grad.	Philosophy / law	Former solicitor general of the United States
John Branch	1801		Former governor of and U.S. senator from North Carolina; secretary of the Navy
Duke Buchan	1985	Economics and Spanish	Former U.S. ambassador to Spain and Andorra
Jonathan W. Daniels	1921 / Grad.		Former White House press secretary
James C. Dobbin	1832		U.S. representative from North Carolina and secretary of the Navy
John Eaton	Grad.		Senator from Tennessee and secretary of war
William Alexander Graham	1824 / Grad.		19th-century US senator and governor of North Carolina; secretary of the Navy; vice-presidential candidate, and CSA senator
C. Boyden Gray	Grad.	Law	Former White House counsel; former ambassador to the EU
Gordon Gray	1930		secretary of the Army; National Security advisor; president of the University of North Carolina
Patricia Horoho	1982	Nursing	Surgeon General of the United States Army
Karl Inderfurth	1968	Political science	Former assistant secretary of state for South Asian Affairs; former U.S. representative for special political affairs to the United Nations
Thomas Krajeski	Grad.	Russian literature	U.S. ambassador to Bahrain; former U.S. ambassador to Yemen
Kevin Martin	1989	Political Science	Former chairman of the Federal Communications Commission
John Y. Mason	1816		Former United States attorney general and secretary of the Navy
H. R. McMaster	Grad.	History	National Security advisor in the Trump administration
Colin R. McMillan	1957	Geology	Former assistant secretary of the Navy; nominee for secretary of defense
Mary J. Miller	Grad.	City and regional planning	Assistant secretary of the Treasury for Financial Markets
Otto Reich	1966	International studies	Former U.S. ambassador to Venezuela
Kenneth Claiborne Royall	1914		Former secretary of war and secretary of the Army
Jacob Thompson	1831		Secretary of the Interior, U.S. representative from Mississippi
Shari Villarosa	1972	International studies	Current ambassador to Mauritius and to the Seychelles
Daniel Werfel	Grad.	Law	Current commissioner of the U.S. Internal Revenue Service

=== Federal judges ===
Name	Class	Major	Notability
Lance Africk	1973 / Grad.	Law	Judge of the U.S. District Court for the Eastern District of Louisiana
James A. Beaty Jr.	Grad.	Law	Judge of the U.S. District Court for the Middle District of North Carolina
J. Spencer Bell	Grad.	Law	Judge of the U.S. Court of Appeals for the Fourth Circuit
Frank William Bullock Jr.	1961 / Grad.	Law	Judge of the U.S. District Court for the Middle District of North Carolina
Algernon Lee Butler			Judge of the U.S. District Court for the Eastern District of North Carolina
Eric L. Clay	1969	Law	Judge of the U.S. Court of Appeals for the Sixth Circuit
Robert Hardy Cleland	Grad.	Law	Judge of the U.S. District Court for the Eastern District of Michigan
Max O. Cogburn Jr.	1973	Political science	Judge of the U.S. District Court for the Western District of North Carolina
Robert P. Dick	1843 / Grad.		Judge of the U.S. District Court for the Western District of North Carolina
Franklin Taylor Dupree Jr.	1933 / Grad.	Law	Judge of the U.S. District Court for the Eastern District of North Carolina
James Carroll Fox	1950 / Grad.	Law	Judge of the U.S. District Court for the Eastern District of North Carolina
Donnell Gilliam	1909 / Grad.	Law	Judge of the U.S. District Court for the Eastern District of North Carolina
Leo M. Gordon	1973		Judge of the United States Court of International Trade
Peter W. Hall	1971 / Grad.	English / education	Judge of the U.S. Court of Appeals for the Second Circuit
David Ezekiel Henderson	1904		Judge of the U.S. District Court for the Western District of North Carolina
Karen L. Henderson	Grad.	Law	Judge of the U.S. Court of Appeals for the District of Columbia Circuit
Truman McGill Hobbs	1942		Judge of the U.S. District Court for the Middle District of Alabama
Algenon L. Marbley	1976	Political science	Judge of the U.S. District Court for the Southern District of Ohio
John Young Mason	1816		Judge of the U.S. District Court for the Eastern District of Virginia
Harold Brent McKnight	1974 / Grad.	Law	Judge of the U.S. District Court for the Western District of North Carolina
James Bryan McMillan	1937		Judge of the U.S. District Court for the Western District of North Carolina
James Ward Morris	1912		Judge of the U.S. District Court for the District of Columbia
Richard E. Myers II	Grad.	Law	Judge of the U.S. District Court for the Eastern District of North Carolina
William Lindsay Osteen Jr.	1983 / Grad.	Law	Judge of the U.S. District Court for the Middle District of North Carolina
William Lindsay Osteen Sr.	Grad.	Law	Judge of the U.S. District Court for the Middle District of North Carolina
John J. Parker	1907 / Grad.	Law	Judge of the U.S. Court of Appeals for the Fourth Circuit
James Dickson Phillips Jr.	Grad.	Law	Judge of the U.S. Court of Appeals for the Fourth Circuit
S. Jay Plager	1952		Judge of the U.S. Court of Appeals for the Federal Circuit
Martin Karl Reidinger	1981 / Grad.	Law	Judge of the U.S. District Court for the Western District of North Carolina
David B. Sentelle	1965 / Grad.	Law	Judge of the U.S. Court of Appeals for the District of Columbia Circuit
Thomas Settle	1850		Judge of the U.S. District Court for the Northern District of Florida
William Bostwick Sheppard	1881		Judge of the U.S. District Court for the Northern District of Florida
Lacy Thornburg	1952 / Grad.	Law	Judge of the U.S. District Court for the Western District of North Carolina
Richard Lesley Voorhees	Grad.	Law	Judge of the U.S. District Court for the Western District of North Carolina
Wilson Warlick	1911 / Grad.	Law	Judge of the U.S. District Court for the Western District of North Carolina
David Dortch Warriner	1951		Judge of the U.S. District Court for the Eastern District of Virginia
Frank DeArmon Whitney	Grad.	Law / business	Judge of the U.S. District Court for the Western District of North Carolina
James A. Wynn Jr.	1975	Journalism	Judge of the U.S. Court of Appeals for the Fourth Circuit

=== Law ===
Name	Class	Major	Notability
Thomas Samuel Ashe	1832		Former justice of the North Carolina Supreme Court; U.S. representative from North Carolina
M. V. Barnhill	Grad.	law	Former chief justice of the North Carolina Supreme Court
William Horn Battle			Former justice of the North Carolina Supreme Court
William H. Bobbitt			Former chief justice of the North Carolina Supreme Court
Peter Carlisle	1974	Psychology	Mayor of Honolulu; former prosecuting attorney of Honolulu
J. Phil Carlton	Grad.	Law	Former justice of the North Carolina Supreme Court
Pamela Brewington Cashwell		Economics, Law	Lawyer; North Carolina secretary of Cultural Resources, North Carolina secretary of Administration
Walter Clark	1864		Former chief justice of the North Carolina Supreme Court
William J. Clarke	1841		Judge of the North Carolina Superior Court
Pell Cooper	1984, 1988	Law	North Carolina District Court judge
Roy Asberry Cooper Jr.	1956	Law	Lawyer and Democratic Party strategist
Sam Currin		Law	United States attorney for the Eastern District of North Carolina, North Carolina Superior Court judge, and chair of the North Carolina Republican Party
Joseph J. Davis	Grad.	Law	Former justice of the North Carolina Supreme Court; U.S. representative from North Carolina
Walter E. Dellinger III	1963	Political science	Former U.S. solicitor general
William A. Devin	Grad.	Law	Former chief justice of the North Carolina Supreme Court
Robert P. Dick	1843		Former justice of the North Carolina Supreme Court; judge for the U.S. District Court for the Western District of North Carolina
Leslie Cooley Dismukes			Secretary of the North Carolina Department of Adult Correction, former Criminal Bureau chief at the North Carolina Department of Justice
Robert H. Edmunds Jr.	Grad.	Law	Current justice of the North Carolina Supreme Court
Elizabeth Edwards	1971 / Grad.	English / Law	Attorney, author and wife of John Edwards
James G. Exum	1957		Former chief justice of the North Carolina Supreme Court
Stormie Forte	1993 / Grad.	sociology, psychology	Lawyer, first black woman and first openly LGBTQ woman to serve on the Raleigh City Council
Franklin Freeman	Grad.	Law	Former justice of the North Carolina Supreme Court
Henry E. Frye	Grad.	Law	Former chief justice of the North Carolina Supreme Court; first African-American chief justice
Robin E. Hudson	Grad.	Law	Current justice of the North Carolina Supreme Court
Robert N. Hunter Jr.	1969 / Grad.	History / law	Former justice of the North Carolina Supreme Court
J. Frank Huskins	1930 / Grad.	Law	Former justice of the North Carolina Supreme Court
Barbara Jackson	1984 / Grad.	Interdisciplinary studies / law	Justice of the North Carolina Supreme Court
Joseph Thomas Knott	1974 / Grad.	Law	Attorney, political candidate, member of the University of North Carolina Board of Governors
James F. Lawrence Jr.	1941		First Marine Corps lawyer to be promoted to brigadier general, Navy Cross recipient
Matthias Evans Manly	1824		Former justice of the North Carolina Supreme Court
John H. Manning	1913 / Grad.	Law	Former adjutant general of North Carolina and U.S. attorney for the Eastern District of North Carolina
Steve Marshall	1987	American studies	Current attorney general of Alabama
Mark Martin	Grad.	Law	Current chief justice of the North Carolina Supreme Court
John Y. Mason	1816		Former United States attorney general and secretary of the Navy
Jesse McClure	1994		Current judge, Texas Court of Criminal Appeals
Burley Mitchell	Grad.	Law	Former chief justice of the North Carolina Supreme Court
Bartholomew F. Moore	1820		Former North Carolina attorney general
Dan K. Moore	1927 / Grad.	Law	Former governor of North Carolina, former justice of N.C. Supreme Court
Paul Martin Newby	Grad.	Law	Current justice of the North Carolina Supreme Court
Mike Nifong	1978	Law	District attorney for Durham County, North Carolina; disbarred for his handling of the 2006 Duke University lacrosse case
Robert F. Orr	1968 / Grad.	Law	Former justice of the North Carolina Supreme Court
Susan Owens	Grad.	Law	Current justice of the Washington Supreme Court
Sarah Parker	Grad.	Law	Former chief justice of the North Carolina Supreme Court
William B. Rodman	1836		Former justice of the North Carolina Supreme Court
Aaron A. F. Seawell	1884		Former justice of the North Carolina Supreme Court
Susie Sharp	Grad.	Law	Former chief justice of the North Carolina Supreme Court, first female chief justice
James E. Shepherd			Former chief justice of the North Carolina Supreme Court
Reggie Shuford	1991	Law	Executive director, ACLU of Pennsylvania
Clive Stafford Smith			Lawyer; founder of Reprieve
Walter P. Stacy	1908		Former chief justice of the North Carolina Supreme Court
Patricia Timmons-Goodson	1976 / Grad.	Speech / law	Former justice of the North Carolina Supreme Court
Earl W. Vaughn	1950 / Grad.	Law	Former justice of the North Carolina Supreme Court, former chief justice of the North Carolina Court of Appeals
John Webb			Former justice of the North Carolina Supreme Court
Willis Whichard	1962 / Grad.	History / law	Former justice of the North Carolina Supreme Court
J. Wallace Winborne			Former chief justice of the North Carolina Supreme Court

=== Religious leaders ===
Name	Class	Major	Notability
Clifton Daniel III	1969	Education	Episcopal bishop of the Diocese of Pennsylvania; former bishop of the Diocese of East Carolina
Thomas F. Davis	1822		Episcopal bishop of South Carolina
Sam Dixon	1971	Political science	Head of the United Methodist Committee on Relief
William Mercer Green	1818		Episcopal bishop of Mississippi
Reid Larkin Neilson	Grad.	Religious history	Managing director of church history, the Church of Jesus Christ of Latter-day Saints
James Hervey Otey	1820 / Grad.		First Episcopal bishop of Tennessee
Lon Solomon	1971	Chemistry	Megachurch evangelist; former member of President's Committee on Intellectual Disabilities
John Shelby Spong	1952	Arts & sciences	Episcopal bishop and progressive theologian
Ruth Carter Stapleton			Evangelist, sister of Jimmy Carter
G. Porter Taylor	1972	English	Episcopal bishop of the Diocese of Western North Carolina
Charles G. vonRosenberg	1969		Episcopal bishop of the Diocese of East Tennessee
Ben Witherington III	1974	English	United Methodist Church minister and New Testament scholar

=== Other ===
Name	Class	Major	Notability
Nina Albert		MBA, MCRP	Acting deputy mayor of Washington, D.C. for planning and economic development (2023–present)
Taylor Brown			New York assistant attorney general and director of the New York City Office of LGBTQIA+ Affairs
Garry Conille	Grad.	Public health	Former prime minister of Haiti
Chelsea Cook			Attorney and member of the City Council of Durham, North Carolina
Charles Dean	1972		Executed in Laos
Loula Friend Dunn		Social work	Social worker, public welfare administrator, and first female executive director of the American Public Welfare Association
Bob Eaves	1958	Accounting	Second Gentleman of North Carolina 2001–2009 and First Gentleman of North Carolina 2009–2013
Thad A. Eure	1921	Law	North Carolina secretary of state
Patricia Hollingsworth Holshouser		Nursing	First Lady of North Carolina; chairwoman of the North Carolina Commission on Citizen Participation; member of the U.S. National Council on Economic Opportunity
Jonathan Howes	Grad.	City and regional planning	Former mayor of Chapel Hill; former secretary of the North Carolina Department of Environment and Natural Resources
Carolyn Leonard Hunt		Education	First Lady of North Carolina
Rashad Hussain	1999	Philosophy, political science	United States special envoy to the Organisation of the Islamic Conference
Perrin Jones			Member of the North Carolina House of Representatives (2019–present)
Jim Jordan	Grad.	Law	Political consultant
Richard M. Kenan	1969		Member of the South Carolina House of Representatives
William Rand Kenan			Collector of the Port of Wilmington
Moushira Khattab	Grad.	International relations	Egyptian politician and diplomat
Pleasant Williams Kittrell	1822	BA, medicine	Planter, physician, member of the Texas House of Representatives for two terms; also served in the legislature for Alabama and North Carolina
Howard Nathaniel Lee	Grad.	Social work	Chairman of the North Carolina State Board of Education
Tim Longest	2013	Economics, philosophy	Member of the North Carolina House of Representatives
Jocelyn Mitnaul Mallette	Grad.	Law	Secretary of the North Carolina Department of Military and Veterans Affairs
Jack McLean	Grad.	African Studies	Second African-American mayor of Tallahassee
Jeanne Milliken Bonds	1985	Economics	Mayor of Knightdale, North Carolina, regional manager of Community Development for North and South Carolina for the Federal Reserve Bank of Richmond, and deputy director of the North Carolina Administrative Office of the Courts
Michael R. Nelson	1989	Political Science	Mayor of Carrboro, North Carolina, commissioner of Orange County; first openly gay mayor in North Carolina
Paul V. Nolan		Two-year medical program	Member of Tennessee General Assembly, 1969–1970
Erica Payne	1991	Radio, television and motion picture	Founder of the Agenda Project
Thomas J. Pearsall	1927	Law	Speaker of the North Carolina House of Representatives in 1947
Sidney Powell	1978	BA, law	Former federal prosecutor; conspiracy theorist who attempted to overturn the 2020 United States presidential election
Ken Russell			Member of the Miami City Commission
Margaret Rose Knight Sanford	1941	English	First Lady of North Carolina
Matt Sherman	1994 / Grad.	History, law	Longest serving U.S. government official to the Iraq and Afghanistan wars
Robert Sprague	Grad.	Business	Member of the Ohio House of Representatives
Anna Harris Stein		JD, Psychology, Public Health	First Lady of North Carolina and legal advisor to the North Carolina Department of Health and Human Services
Samuel Barron Stephens	1832	Law	Member of the Florida House of Representatives
Ivy Taylor	Grad.	City and regional planning	Mayor of San Antonio
Richard Vinroot	1963 / Grad.	Business, law	Mayor of Charlotte

== Sciences ==
Name	Class	Major	Notability
Eben Alexander III	1975	Chemistry	Neurosurgeon and author
Richard Bohannon	Grad.	Physical Therapy	Physiotherapist, author, and professor
Charles E. Brady Jr.	1971	Pre-medicine	Astronaut, flight surgeon
Zena Cardman	2010	Biology	Astronaut and research scientist
Chad M. Cary	2001	Environmental Science	Rear admiral in National Oceanic and Atmospheric Administration (NOAA) Commissioned Officer Corps; director of NOAA Commissioned Officer Corps (2024–present)
Francis Collins	Grad.	Medicine	Director of National Human Genome Project; director of National Institutes of Health (2009–present)
Kizzmekia Corbett	Grad.	Microbiology and Immunology	Viral immunologist at the Vaccine Research Center at the National Institute of Allergy and Infectious Diseases, NIH; key in developing the Moderna COVID-19 vaccine
Robert F. Furchgott	1937	Chemistry	Chemist; Nobel Prize winner in 1998
Seymour Geisser	Grad.	Statistics	Statistician and DNA evidence expert
Ma Haide	1932	Pre-medicine	Doctor and public health official in China
Nancy Haigwood	Grad.		HIV/AIDS researcher; director of the Oregon National Primate Research Center
Marc Levoy	1989	Computer Science	Computer graphics expert
Jerry M. Linenger	Grad.	Public health	Astronaut, captain in the United States Navy Medical Corps
David M. Morris	BS	Physical therapy	Distinguished professor at the University of Alabama at Birmingham
Lloyd S. Nelson	1943	Chemistry	Statistician
Howard T. Odum	1947	Zoology	Ecosystem ecologist
Tamara Sher	Grad.	Psychology	NIH researcher and IIT professor
Kevin R. Stone	Grad.	Medicine	Orthopedic surgeon
Charles Tart	Grad.	Psychology	Psychologist
William E. Thornton	1952 / Grad.	Physics / medicine	Astronaut and medical professor

== Sports ==
=== Baseball ===
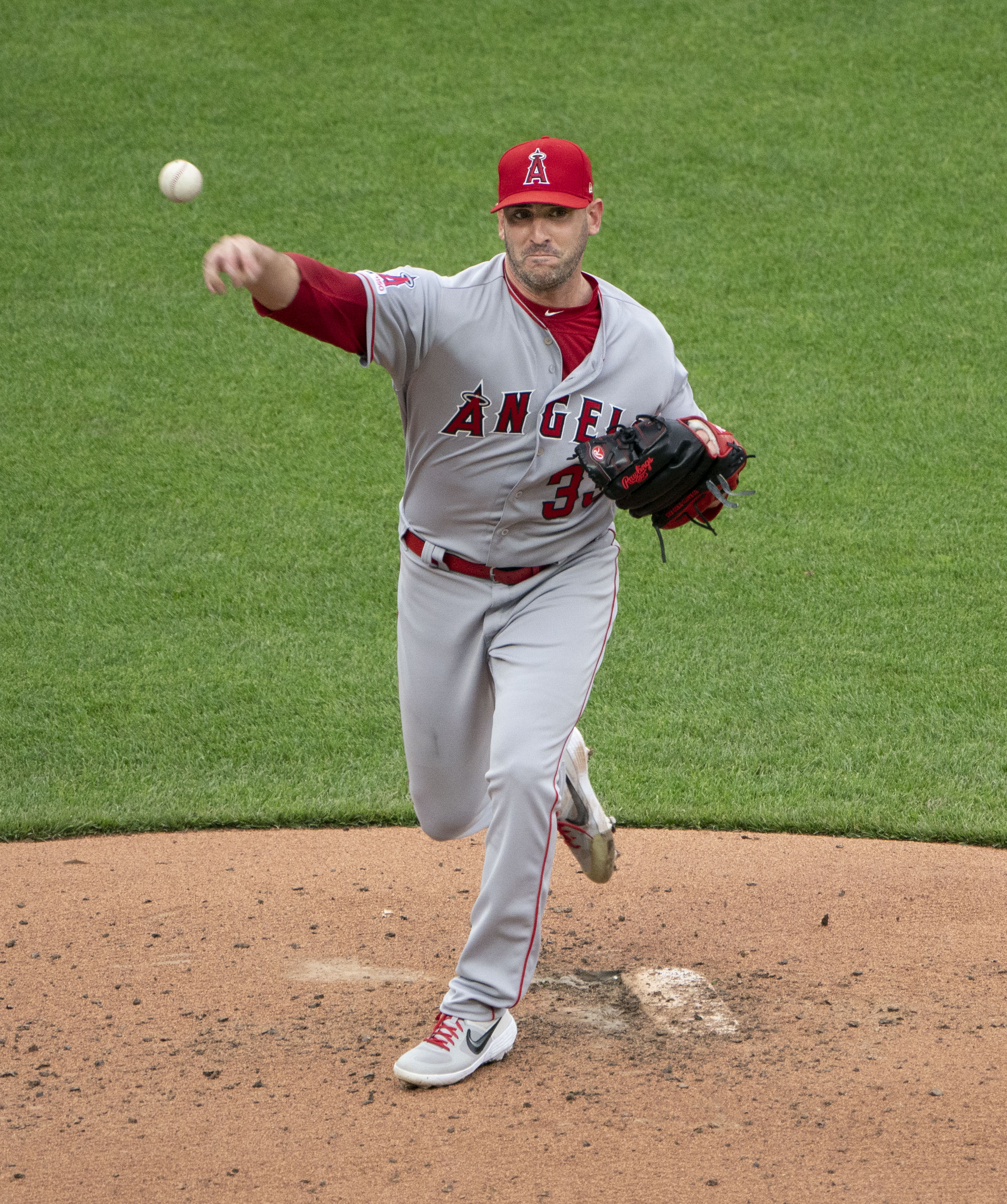
Matt Harvey

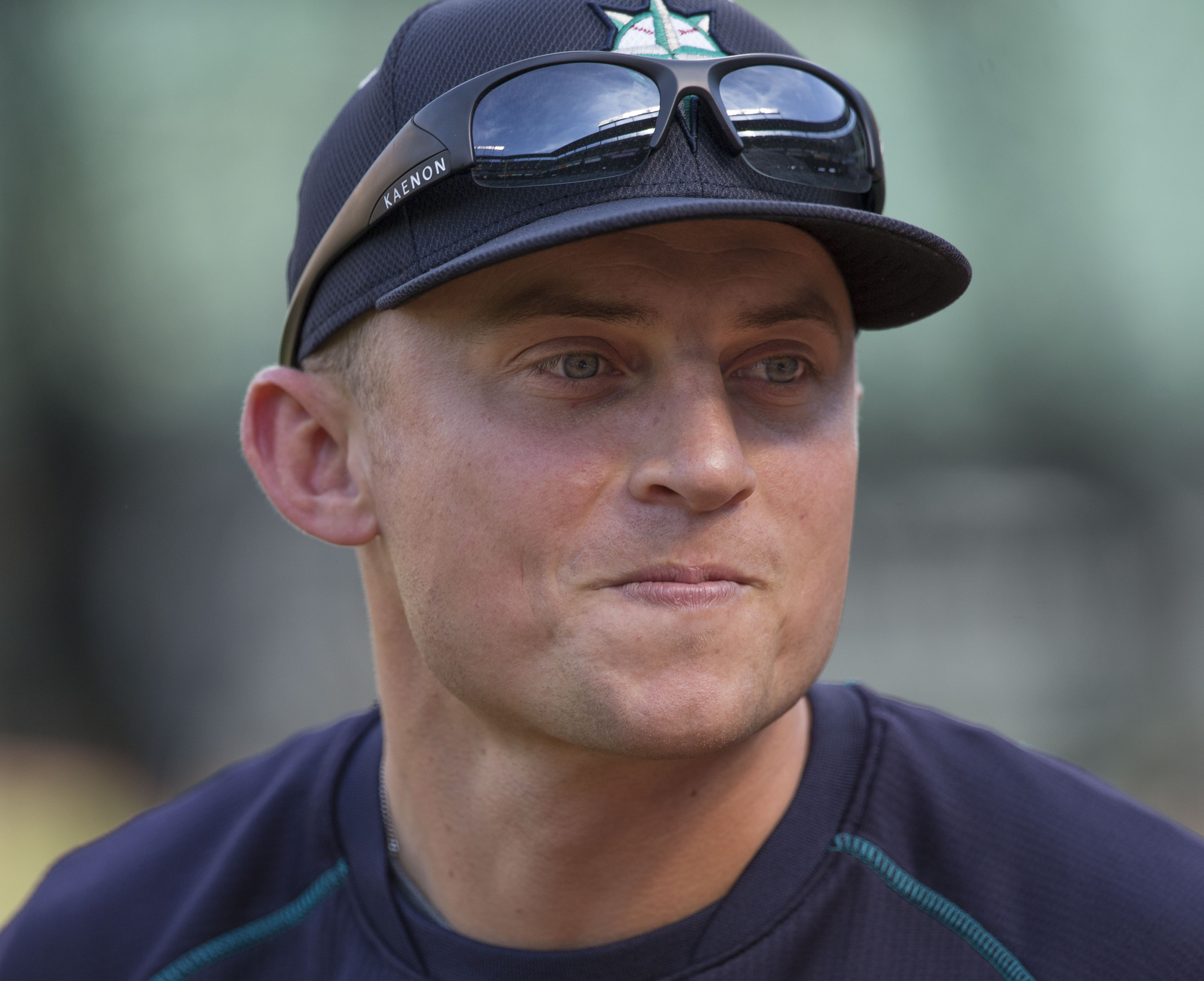
Kyle Seager

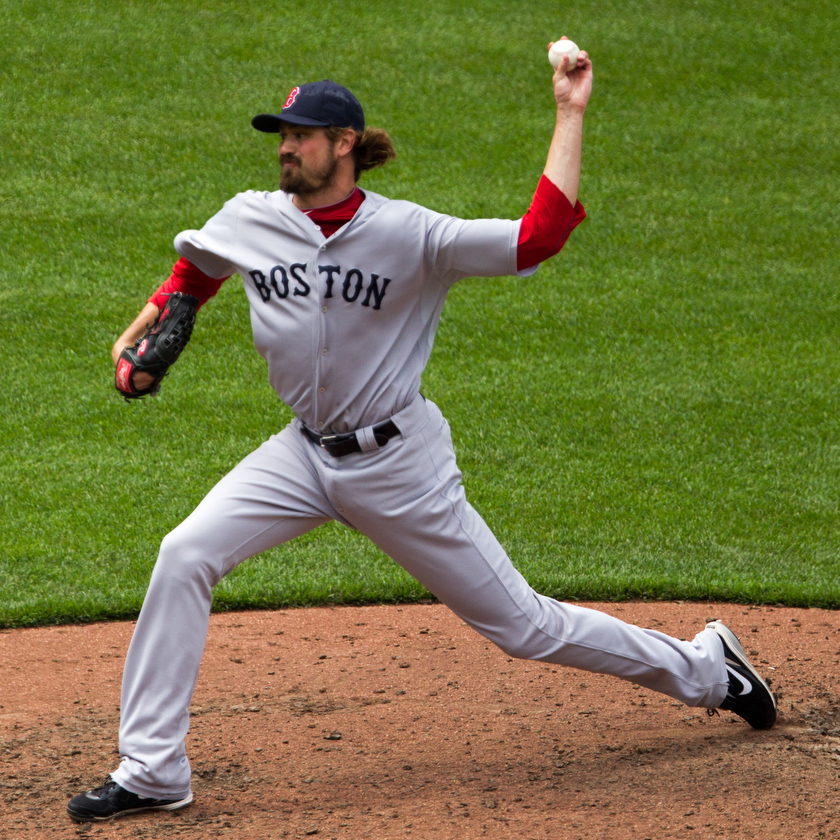
Andrew Miller

Name	Class	Major	Notability
Dustin Ackley			Professional baseball player
Russ Adams			Professional baseball player
Daniel Bard	2006		Professional baseball player
Skye Bolt			Baseball player for the San Francisco Giants
Kent Emanuel			Professional baseball player
Mike Fox	1978	Physical education	College baseball coach
Zac Gallen			Professional baseball player
Moonlight Graham			Professional baseball player
Adam Greenberg			Professional baseball player
Matt Harvey			Professional baseball player
Gary Hill			Professional baseball player
Chris Iannetta			Professional baseball player
Mark Kingston	1995	Communications	Professional baseball player, college baseball coach
Andrew Miller			Professional baseball player
Colin Moran			Professional baseball player
Mike Morin			Professional baseball player
R. C. Orlan			Professional baseball player
Brian Roberts		Transferred to USC	Professional baseball player
Kyle Seager			Professional baseball player
Paul Shuey			Professional baseball player
Kyle Snyder			Professional baseball player
B.J. Surhoff			Former professional baseball player
Trent Thornton			Professional baseball player
Walt Weiss			Former professional baseball player
Brad Woodall			Professional baseball player

=== Basketball players ===
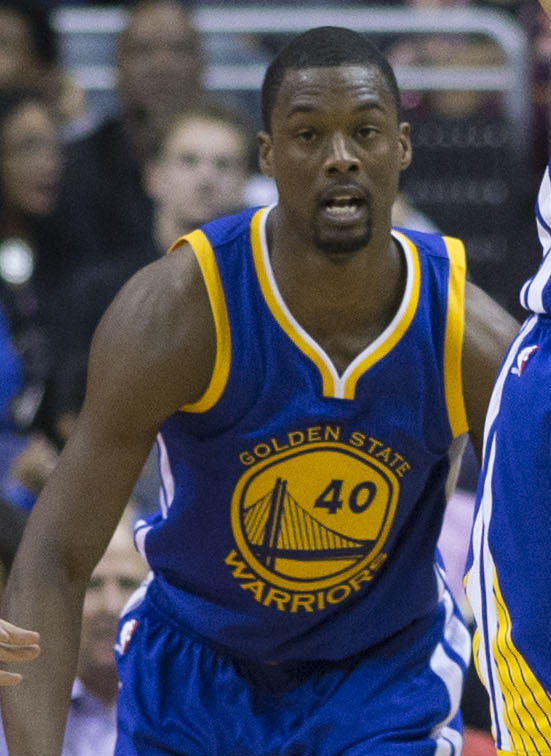
Harrison Barnes

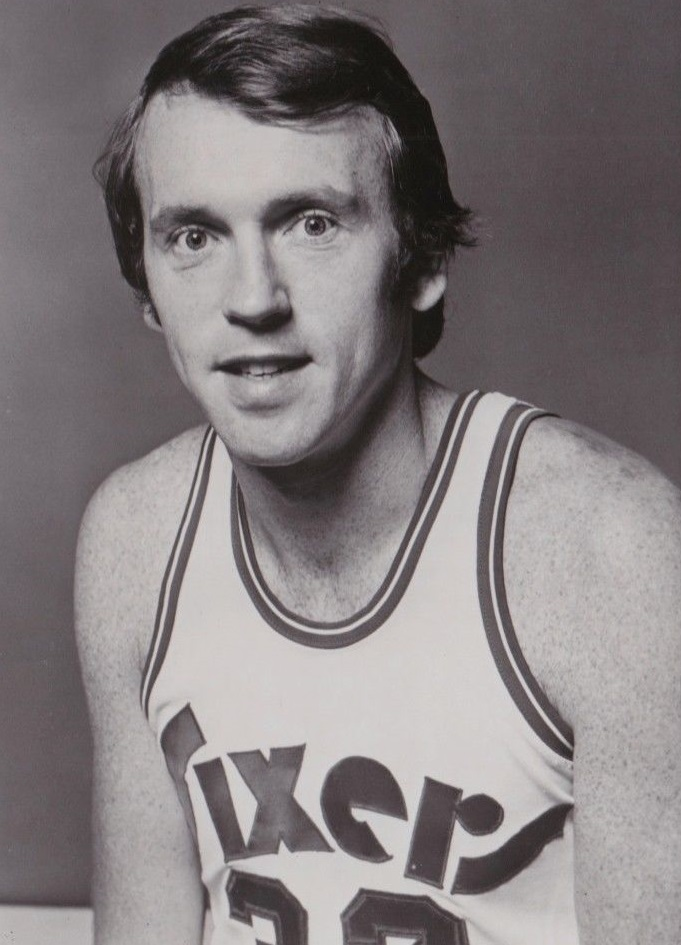
Billy Cunningham

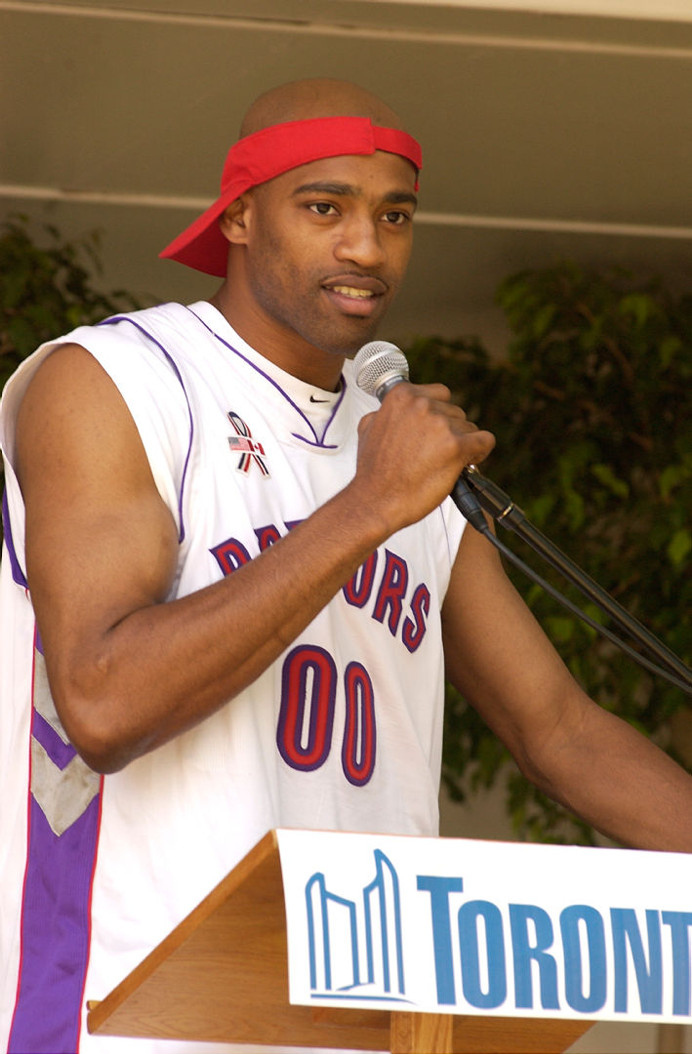
Vince Carter

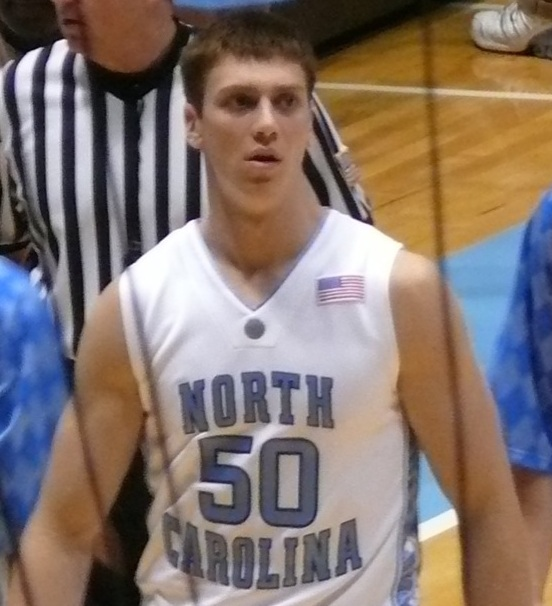
Tyler Hansbrough

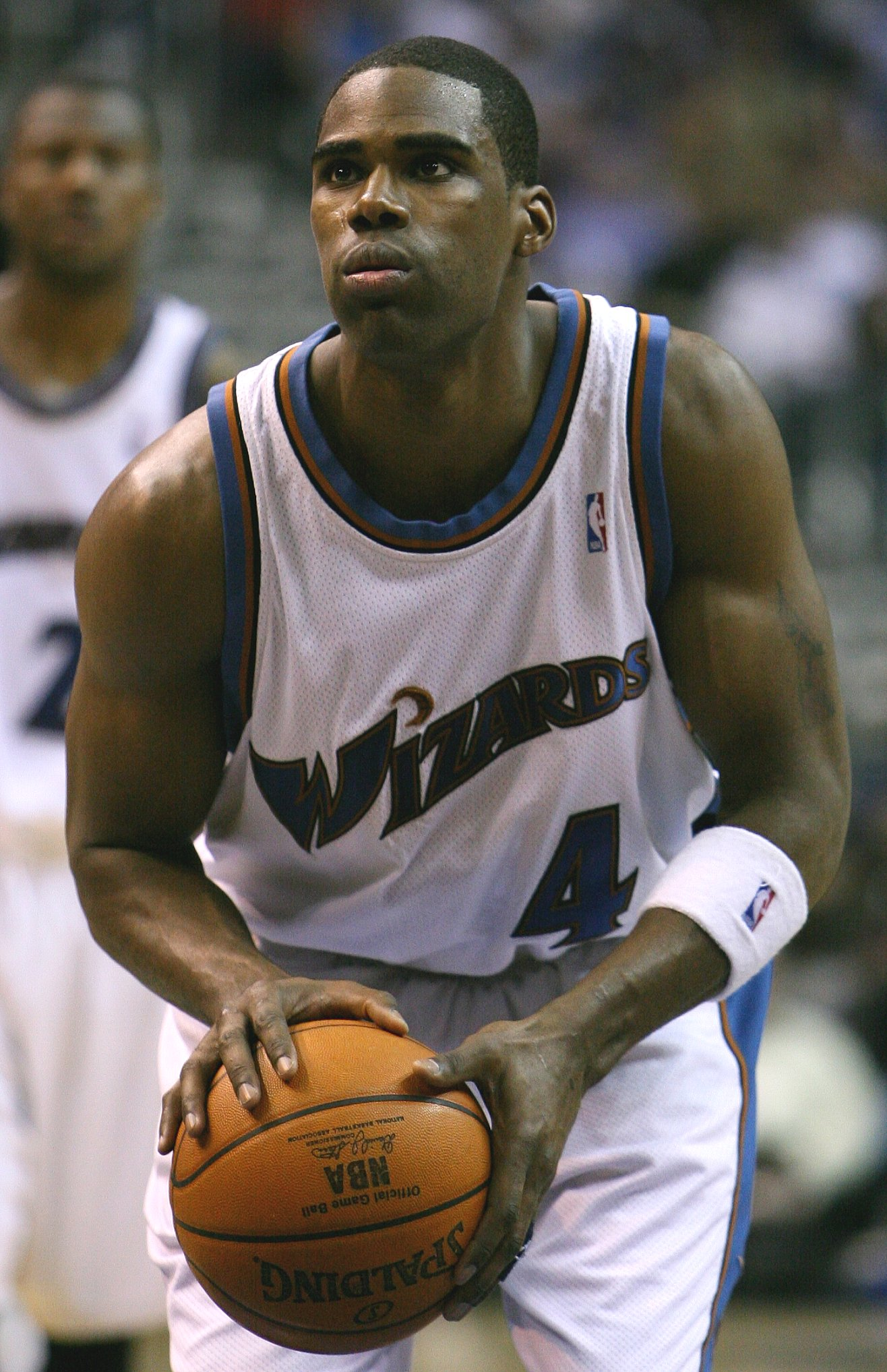
Antawn Jamison

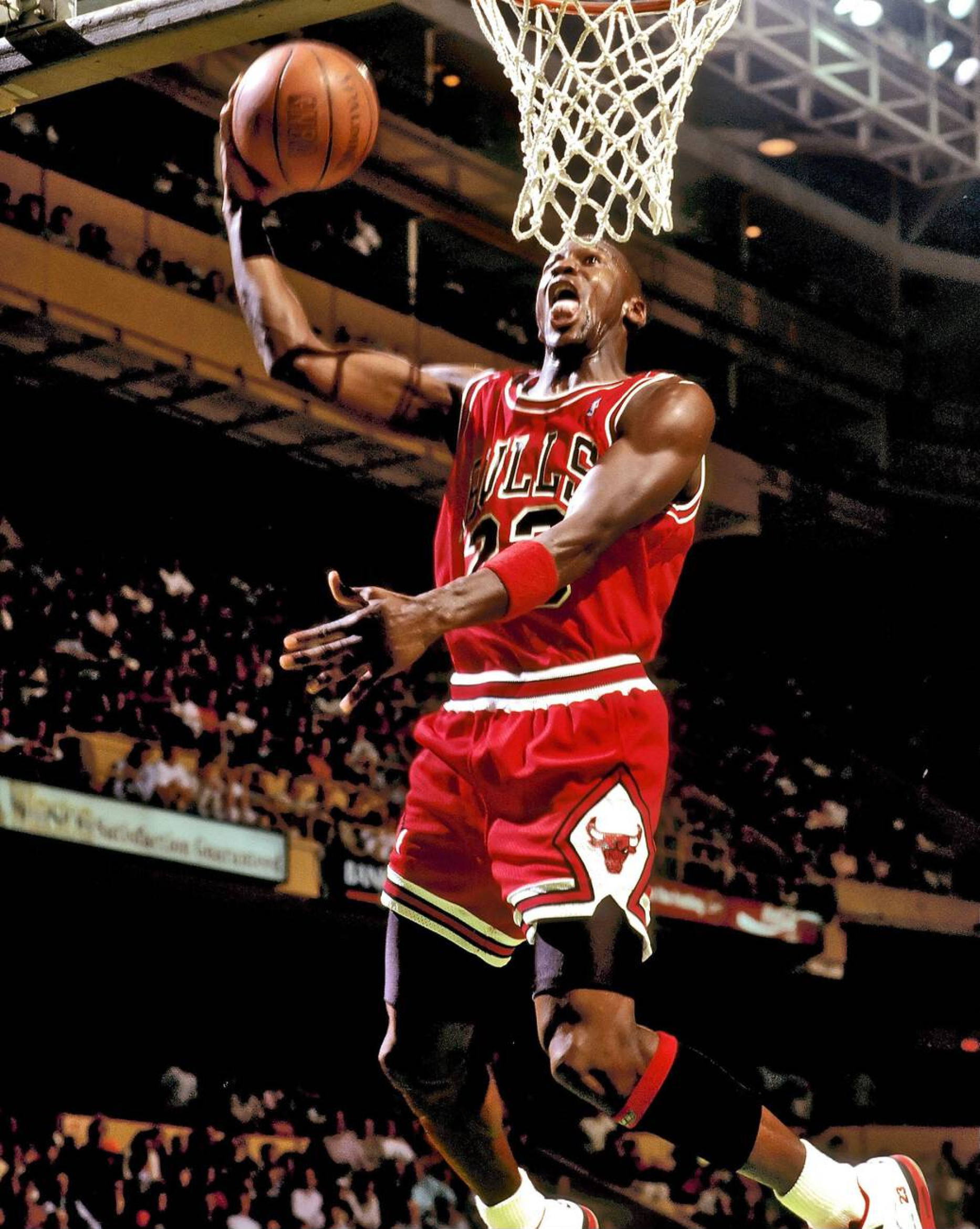
Michael Jordan

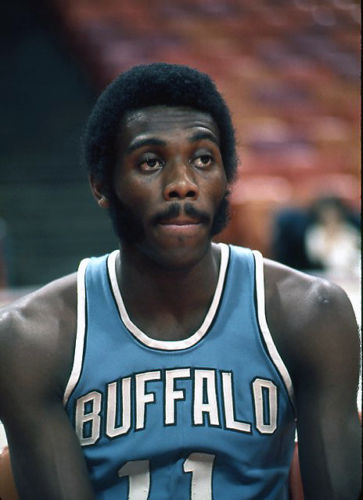
Bob McAdoo

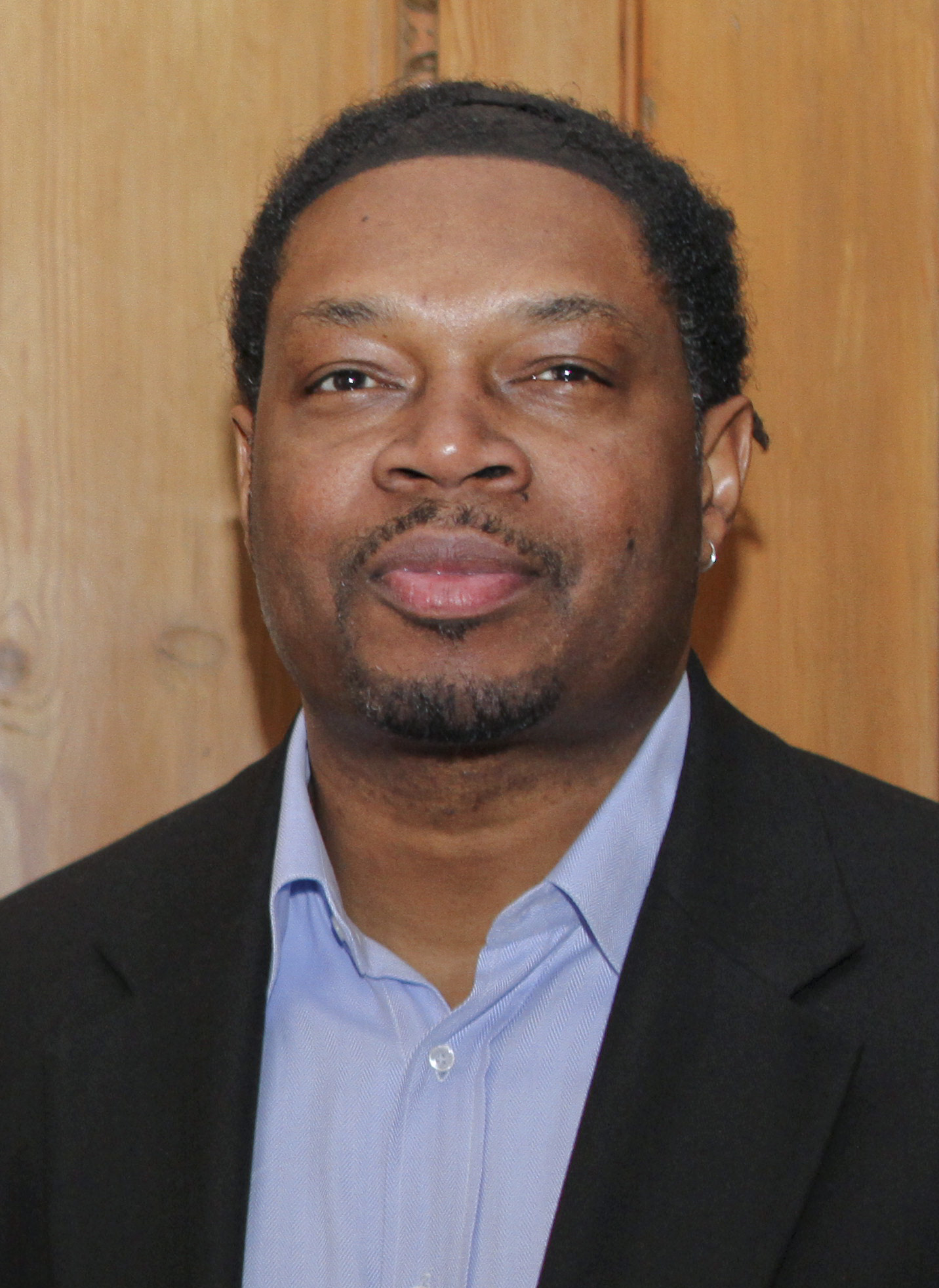
Sam Perkins

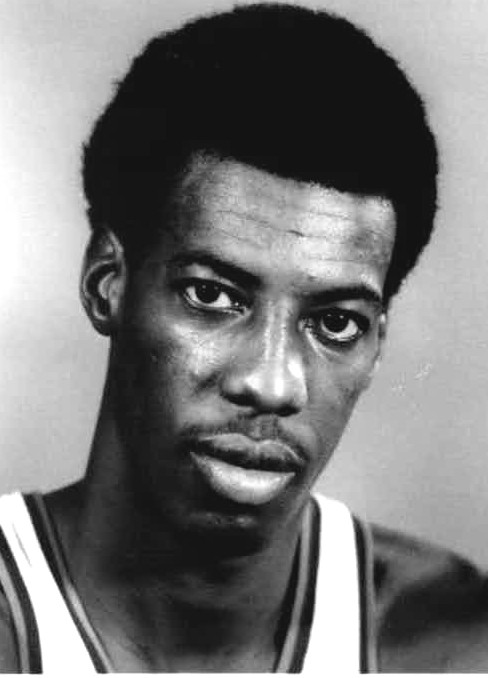
Charlie Scott

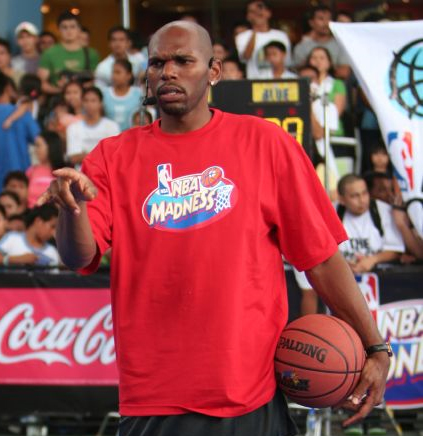
Jerry Stackhouse

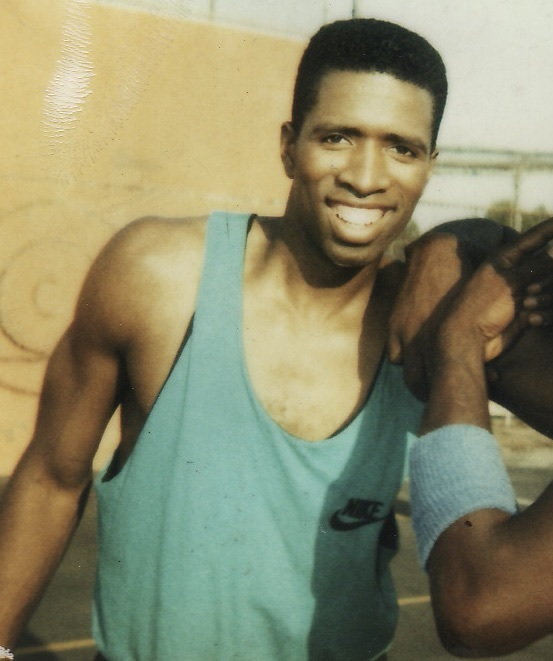
Kenny Smith

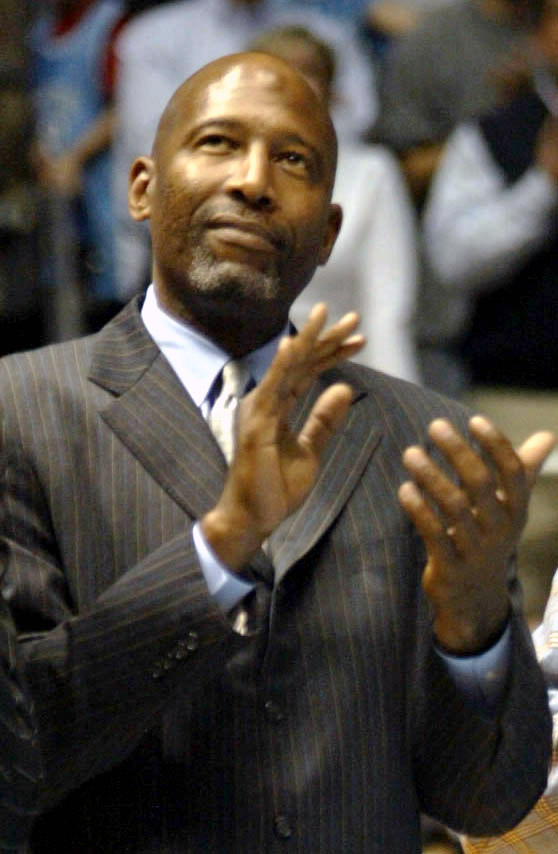
James Worthy

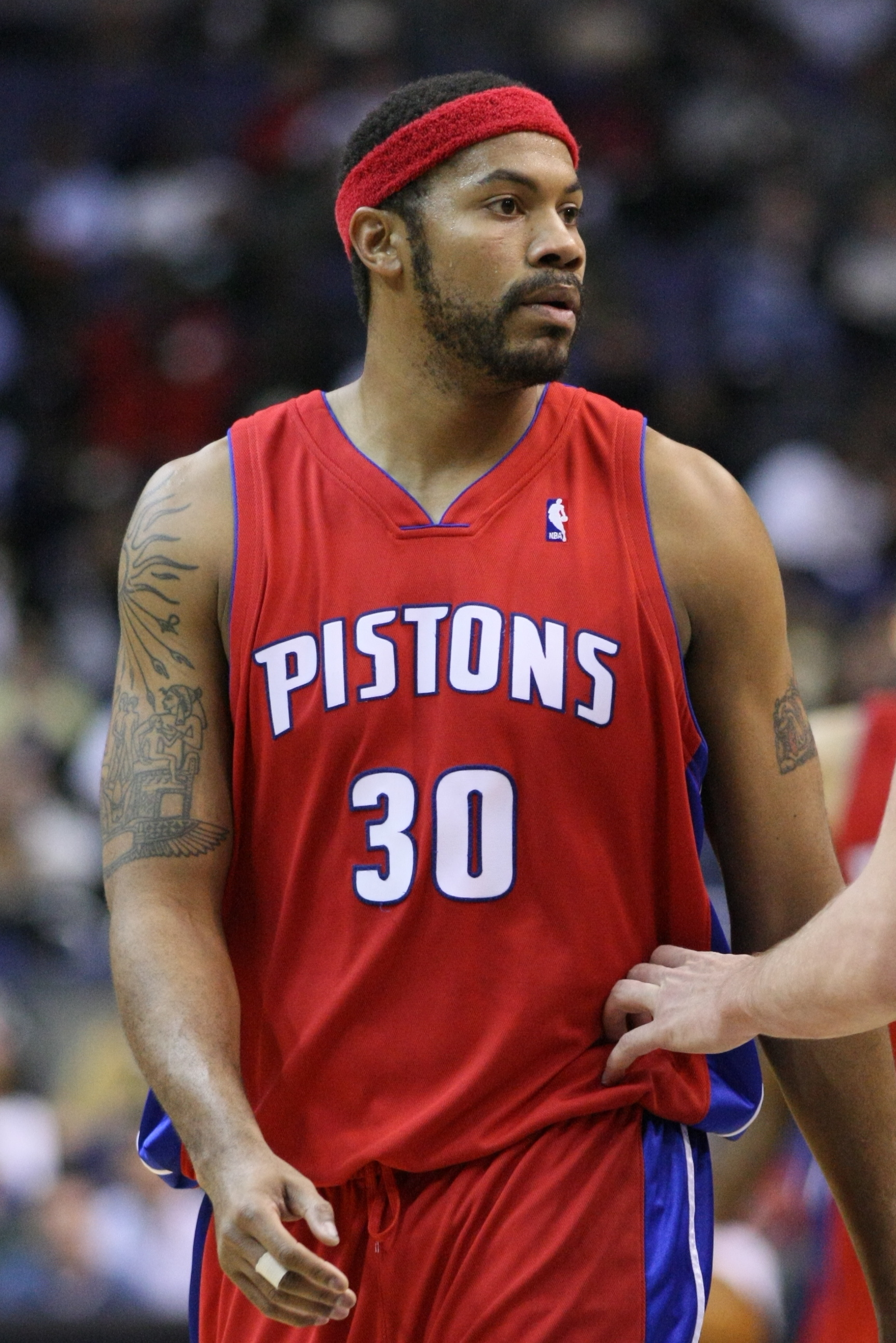
Rasheed Wallace

Name	Class	Major	Notability
Cole Anthony			Professional basketball player
La'Tangela Atkinson	2006		former professional basketball player
Armando Bacot	2023	Exercise & Sport Science	Professional basketball player
LaQuanda Barksdale	2001		Former professional basketball player
Harrison Barnes		Business Administration	Professional basketball player
Joel Berry	2018	Exercise & Sport Science	Professional basketball player
Garrison Brooks	2021	Communication studies	Professional basketball player
Dudley Bradley	1979	Recreation administration	Professional basketball player
Tony Bradley			Professional basketball player
Pete Brennan	1958	Industrial relations	Professional basketball player
Nate Britt	2017	Management & Society	Professional basketball player
Larry Brown	1963	History	College and professional basketball coach; member of the Basketball Hall of Fame
Leaky Black	2022	Exercise & sport science	Professional basketball player
Steve Bucknall	1989	Radio, television and motion picture	Professional basketball player and coach
Reggie Bullock			Professional basketball player
Vince Carter	2001	African-American studies	Professional basketball player
Pete Chilcutt	1991	Industrial relations / psychology	Professional basketball player
Ed Cota			Professional basketball player
Sylvia Crawley	1994	Radio, television and motion picture	Professional basketball player
Billy Cunningham	1971	History	Professional basketball player and member of the Basketball Hall of Fame
Brad Daugherty	1986	Radio, television and motion picture	Former professional basketball player and sportscaster
Ed Davis			Professional basketball player
Hubert Davis	1992	Criminal justice	Professional basketball player
Walter Davis	1988	Recreation administration	Professional basketball player
John Dillon	1948		Professional basketball player
Wayne Ellington			Professional basketball player
Darrell Elston	1974	History	Professional basketball player
Cecil Exum	1984		Professional basketball player
Jalek Felton		Attended; Later withdrew	Professional basketball player
Raymond Felton			Professional basketball player
Phil Ford	1978	Business administration	Professional basketball player
Joseph Forte			Professional basketball player
Rick Fox	1994	Radio, television and motion picture	Professional basketball player and actor
Marcus Ginyard	2010	Communication studies & sociology	Professional basketball player
George Glamack			Professional basketball player
Danny Green	2009	Communications	Professional basketball player
PJ Hairston		Communication Studies	Professional basketball player
Tyler Hansbrough	2009	Communications	Professional basketball player
Brendan Haywood	2001	Communications	Professional basketball player
John Henson			Professional basketball player
Isaiah Hicks	2017	Exercise & sport science	Professional basketball player
Harrison Ingram			Professional basketball player
Justin Jackson			Professional basketball player
Joel James	2016	History	Professional basketball player
Antawn Jamison			Professional basketball player
Brice Johnson	2016	Exercise & Sport Science	Professional basketball player
Cameron Johnson	Grad.	Sports Administration	Professional basketball player
Bobby Jones	1974	Psychology	Professional basketball player
Marion Jones			Professional basketball player; former track and field athlete
Michael Jordan	1986	Geography	Former professional baseball and basketball player; member of the Basketball Hall of Fame
George Karl	1973		Professional basketball player and coach
Tommy Kearns	1958	History	Professional basketball player
Walker Kessler			Professional basketball player
Justin Knox	2011	Business Administration	Professional basketball player
Mitch Kupchak	1976	Political science / psychology	Professional basketball player and general manager of the Charlotte Hornets
York Larese	1961	Sociology	Professional basketball player and coach
Ivory Latta	2007	Exercise / sports science	Professional basketball player
Ty Lawson			Professional basketball player
Nassir Little			Professional basketball player
George Lynch	1993	African studies	Professional basketball player
Kendall Marshall			Professional basketball player
Sean May	2009	African-American studies	Professional basketball player
Luke Maye	2019	Business Administration	Professional basketball player
Bob McAdoo			Professional basketball player and member of the Basketball Hall of Fame
James Michael McAdoo			Professional basketball player
Rashad McCants			Professional basketball player
Rashanda McCants	2009		Professional basketball player
Leslie McDonald			Professional basketball player
Jeff McInnis			Professional basketball player
Horace McKinney	1948		Professional basketball player and coach, college coach
Brady Manek			Professional basketball player
Kennedy Meeks	2017	Communication studies	Professional basketball player
Orlando Meléndez	2002		Former professional basketball player
Larry Miller	1968	Business administration	Professional basketball player
Doug Moe			Professional basketball player and coach
Eric Montross	1994		Professional basketball player
David Noel	2006	African-American studies	Professional basketball player
Mike O'Koren	1980		Professional basketball player
Ademola Okulaja	1999	International studies	Professional basketball player
Marcus Paige	2016	Journalism/History	Professional basketball player
Sam Perkins	1984	Radio, television and motion picture	Professional basketball player
Theo Pinson	2018	communication studies	Professional basketball player
Dave Popson	1987	Geography	Professional basketball player
J.R. Reid	1992	Radio, television and motion picture	Professional basketball player
Henrik Rödl	1993	Biology	Professional basketball player and coach
Lennie Rosenbluth	1957		Professional basketball player
Clifford Rozier			Professional basketball player
Tierra Ruffin-Pratt			Professional basketball player
Charlie Scott			Professional basketball player
Lee Shaffer	1960	Business administration	Professional basketball player
Day'Ron Sharpe			Professional basketball player
Charlotte Smith	1999	Sociology	Professional basketball player
Kenny Smith			Professional basketball player and basketball analyst
Jerry Stackhouse	1999	African-American studies	Professional basketball player
Dexter Strickland			Professional basketball player
J.P. Tokoto			Professional basketball player for Hapoel Tel Aviv of the Israeli Basketball Premier League
Rasheed Wallace			Professional basketball player
Stephanie Watts	2019	Public Policy	Professional basketball player
Coby White			Professional basketball player
Kenny Williams	2019	exercise & sport science	Professional basketball player
Marvin Williams	2014	African-American studies	Professional basketball player
Seventh Woods			Professional basketball player
Scott Williams			Professional basketball player
Shammond Williams			Professional basketball player
Caleb Wilson			Professional basketball player
Jae'Lyn Withers	2025	Applied professional studies	Professional basketball player
Joe Wolf	1987	Industrial relations	Professional basketball player
Al Wood	1988	Recreation administration	Professional basketball player
James Worthy	1985	Recreation administration	Professional basketball player and member of the Basketball Hall of Fame
Brandan Wright			Professional basketball player
Tyler Zeller	2012	Business administration	Professional basketball player

=== Basketball coaches ===
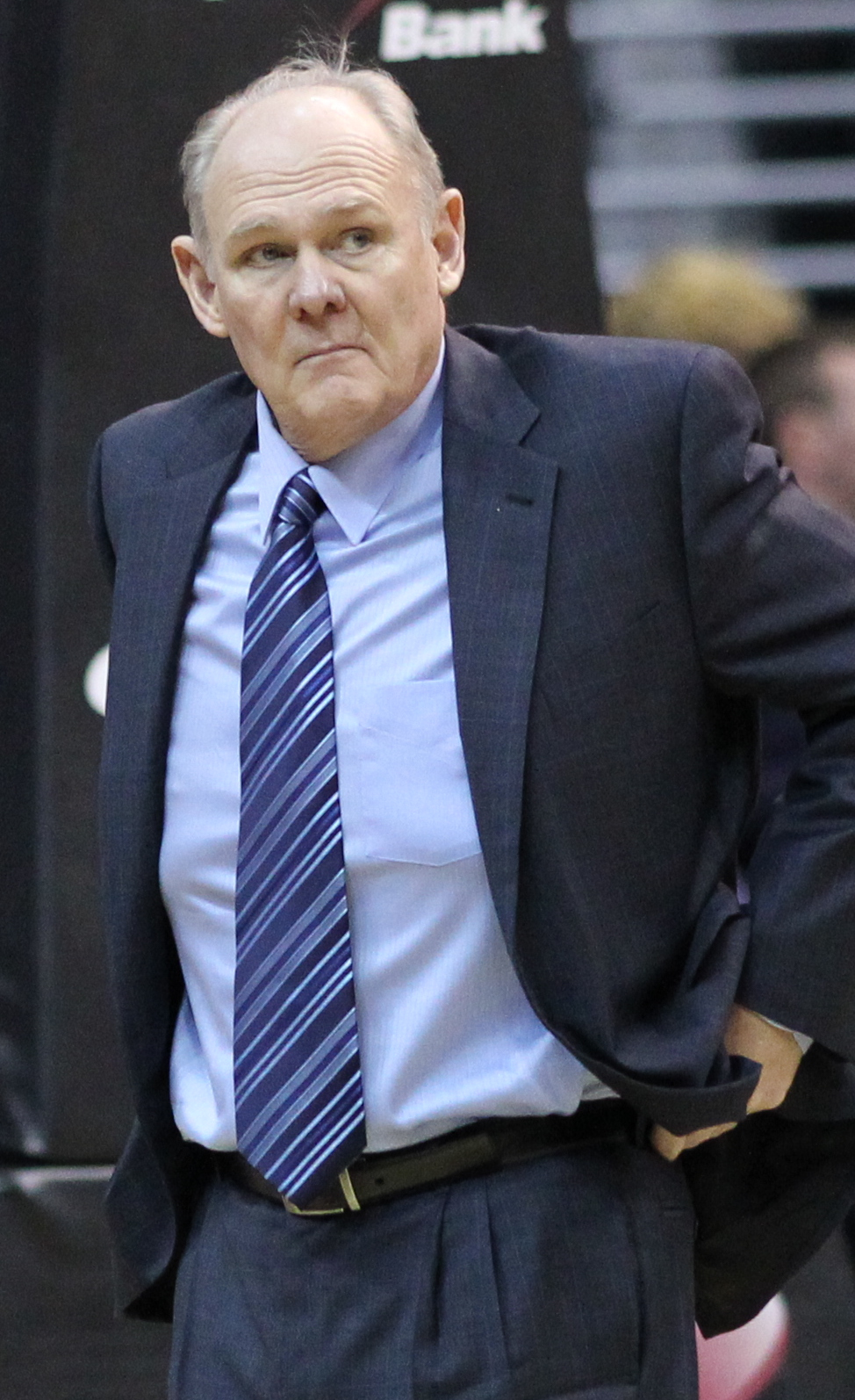
George Karl

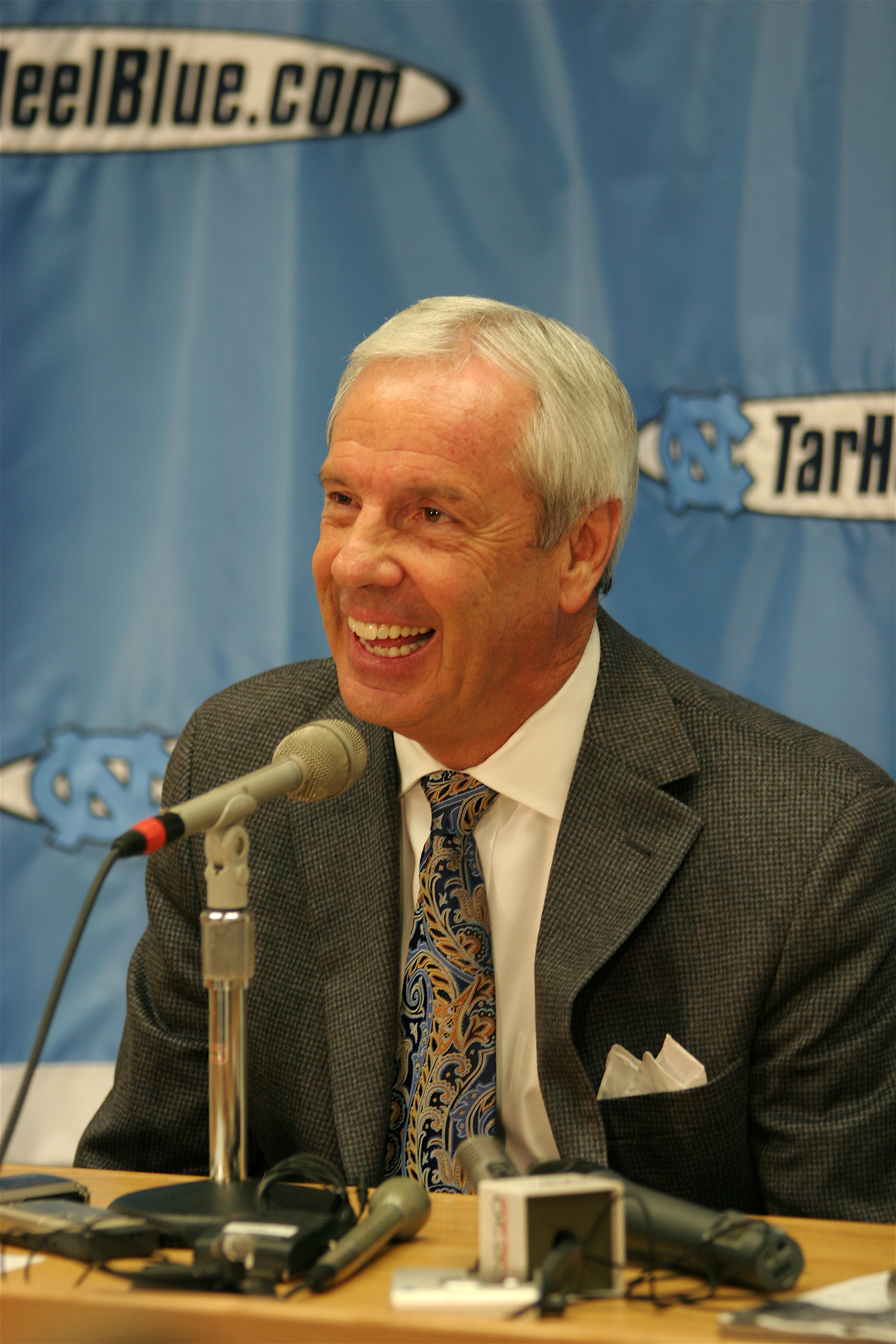
Roy Williams

Name	Class	Major	Notability
Larry Brown	1963	History	College and professional basketball coach; member of the Basketball Hall of Fame
Jason Capel	2002	Communications	College basketball coach
Scott Cherry	1993	Business administration	College basketball coach
Billy Cunningham	1971	History	Professional basketball coach and member of the Basketball Hall of Fame
Hubert Davis	1992	Criminal justice	Professional basketball player and current UNC men's head coach since 2021
Matt Doherty	1984	Business administration	College basketball coach, UNC men's head coach 2000–2003
Eddie Fogler	1970 / Grad.	Mathematics / physical education	College basketball coach
George Karl	1973	Professional basketball player and coach	
John Kuester	1977	Health	Professional and college coach
Jeff Lebo	1990	Business administration	College basketball coach
Monk McDonald	1923 / Grad.	Medicine	College basketball player and coach
Wes Miller	2007	Political science	College basketball coach
Doug Moe			Professional basketball player and coach
Mike O'Koren	1980	Recreation administration	Professional basketball player and coach
Buzz Peterson	1986	Geography	College basketball coach
King Rice	1992	Radio, television and motion picture	College basketball coach
Henrik Rödl	1993	Biology	Professional basketball player and coach
Tony Shaver	1976 / Grad.	Business administration / education	College basketball coach
Roy Williams	1972 / Grad.	Education	College basketball coach; member of the Basketball Hall of Fame; UNC men's head coach 2003–2021

=== Football players ===
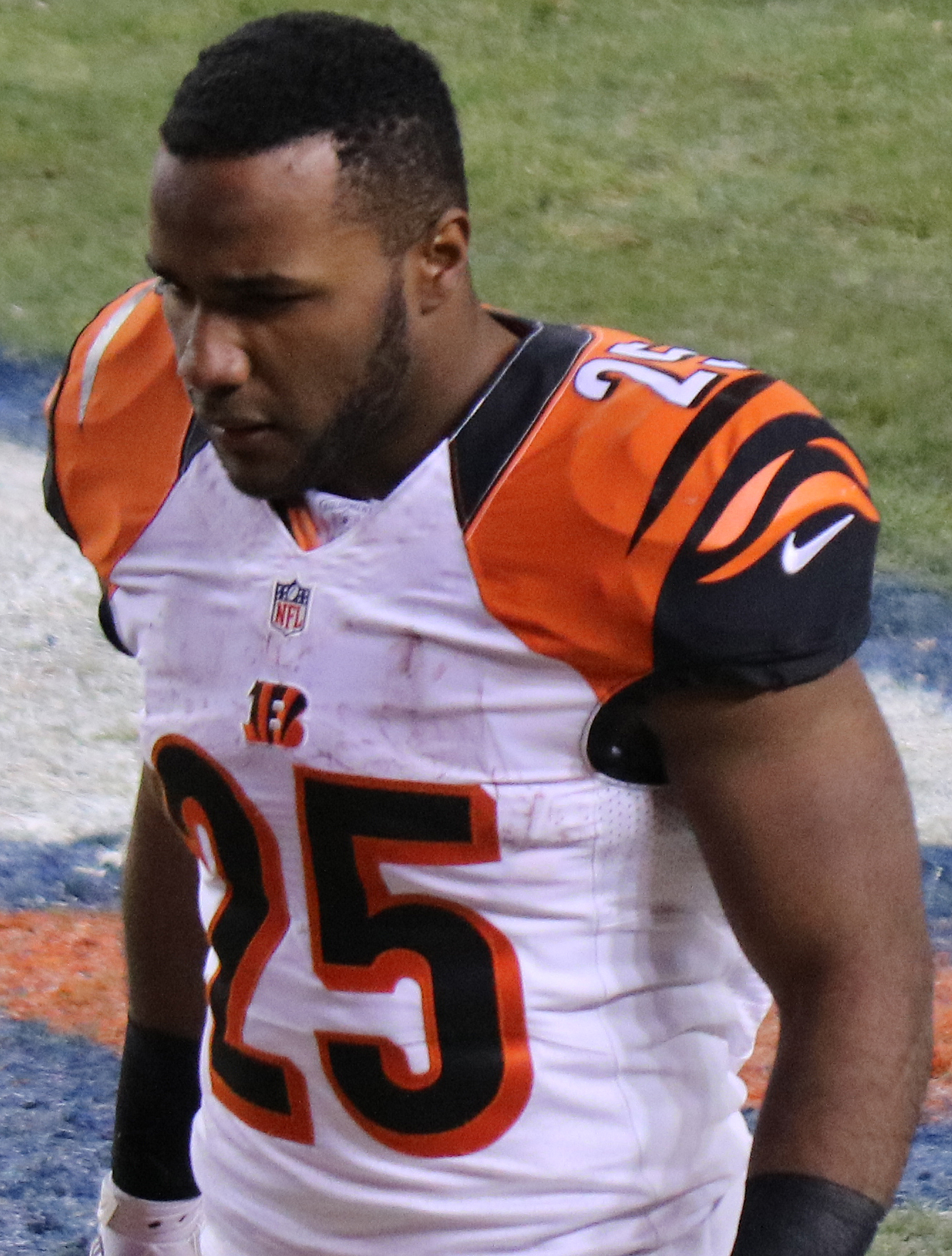
Giovani Bernard

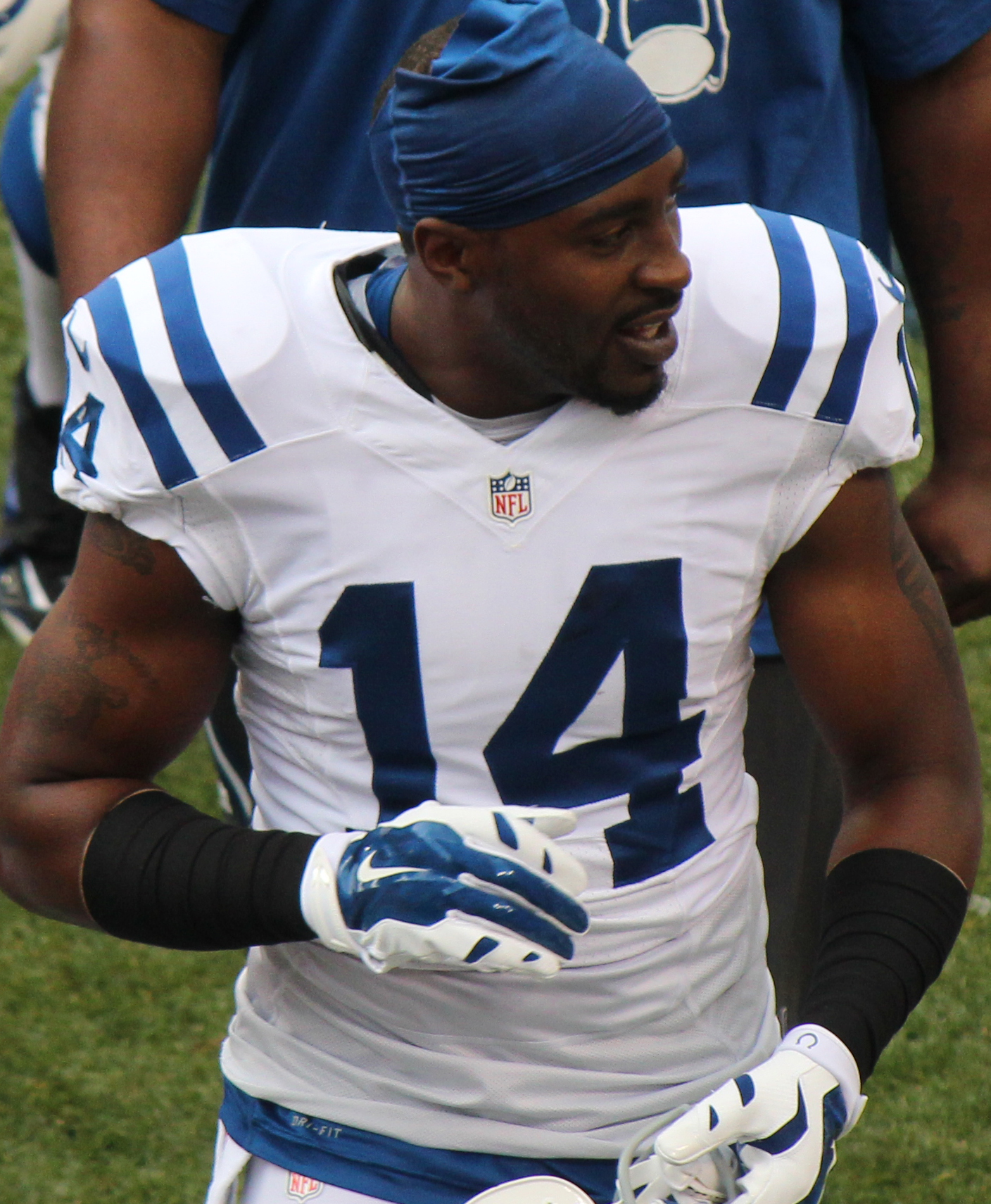
Hakeem Nicks

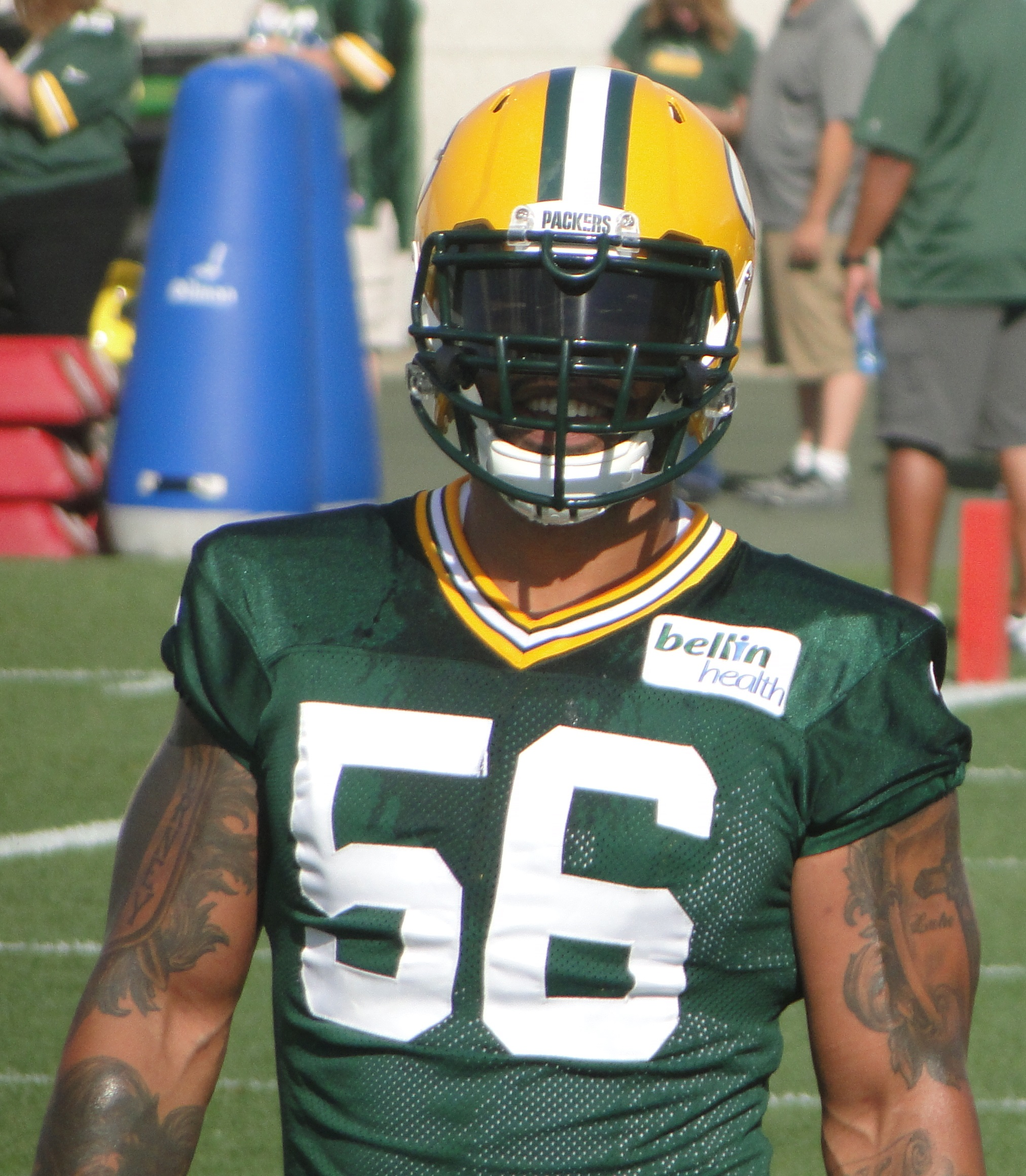
Julius Peppers

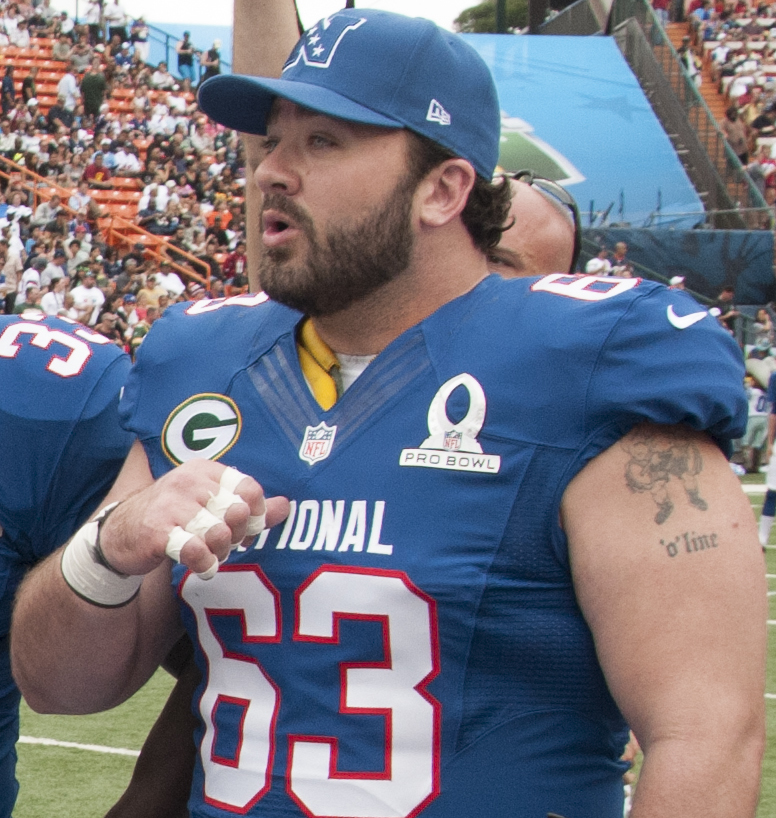
Jeff Saturday

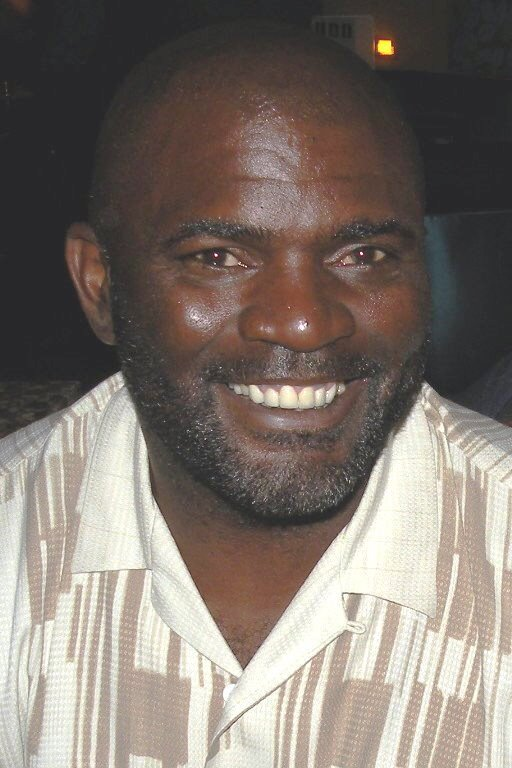
Lawrence Taylor

Name	Class	Major	Notability
Sam Aiken			Professional football player
Ethan Albright			Professional football player
Frank Aschenbrenner			Professional football player
Matthew Baker			Professional football player
Connor Barth	2007	Communications studies	Professional football player
Harris Barton		Finance	Professional football player
Giovani Bernard			Professional football player
Dré Bly			Professional football player
Brian Bollinger			Professional football player
Omar Brown			Professional football player
Jonathan Cooper			Professional football player
Quinton Coples			Professional football player
Alge Crumpler			Professional football player
Ronald Curry			Professional football player
Paul Davis			Professional football player
Dave Drechsler			Professional football player
Darian Durant			Professional football player
Greg Ellis			Professional football player
Brooks Foster	2008	Management & society	Professional football player
Jeff Hayes			Professional football player
William Henderson			Professional football player
Nate Hobgood-Chittick			Professional football player
Jesse Holley			Professional football player
Mack Hollins			Professional football player
James Hurst			Professional football player
Charlie Justice			Professional football player and member of the College Football Hall of Fame
Drake Maye			Professional football player
Kivuusama Mays			Professional football player
Don McCauley			Professional football player and member of the College Football Hall of Fame
Tom McCauley			Professional football player
Natrone Means			Professional football player
Hakeem Nicks			Professional football player, New York Giants
Willie Parker			Professional football player
Julius Peppers			Professional football player
Jeff Reed			Professional football player
Dexter Reid			Professional football player
Jeff Saturday			Professional football player
Brian Simmons			Professional football player
Dave Simmons			Professional football player
Lawrence Taylor			Professional football player and member of the Football Hall of Fame
David Thornton			Professional football player
Mitchell Trubisky			professional football player
Art Weiner			College Football Hall of Fame
Brennan Williams			Professional football player
T. J. Yates			Professional football player

=== Football coaches ===
Name	Class	Major	Notability
Charlie Baggett			College and professional football coach
Rod Broadway			College football coach
Bud Carson	1951		College and professional football coach
Scot Dapp	Grad.	Physical education	College football coach
Arthur Smith			Professional football coach
Jim Tatum	1939	Business administration	College football coach
Kevin Wilson	1984 / Grad.	Mathematics / physical education	College football coach

=== Soccer (football) ===
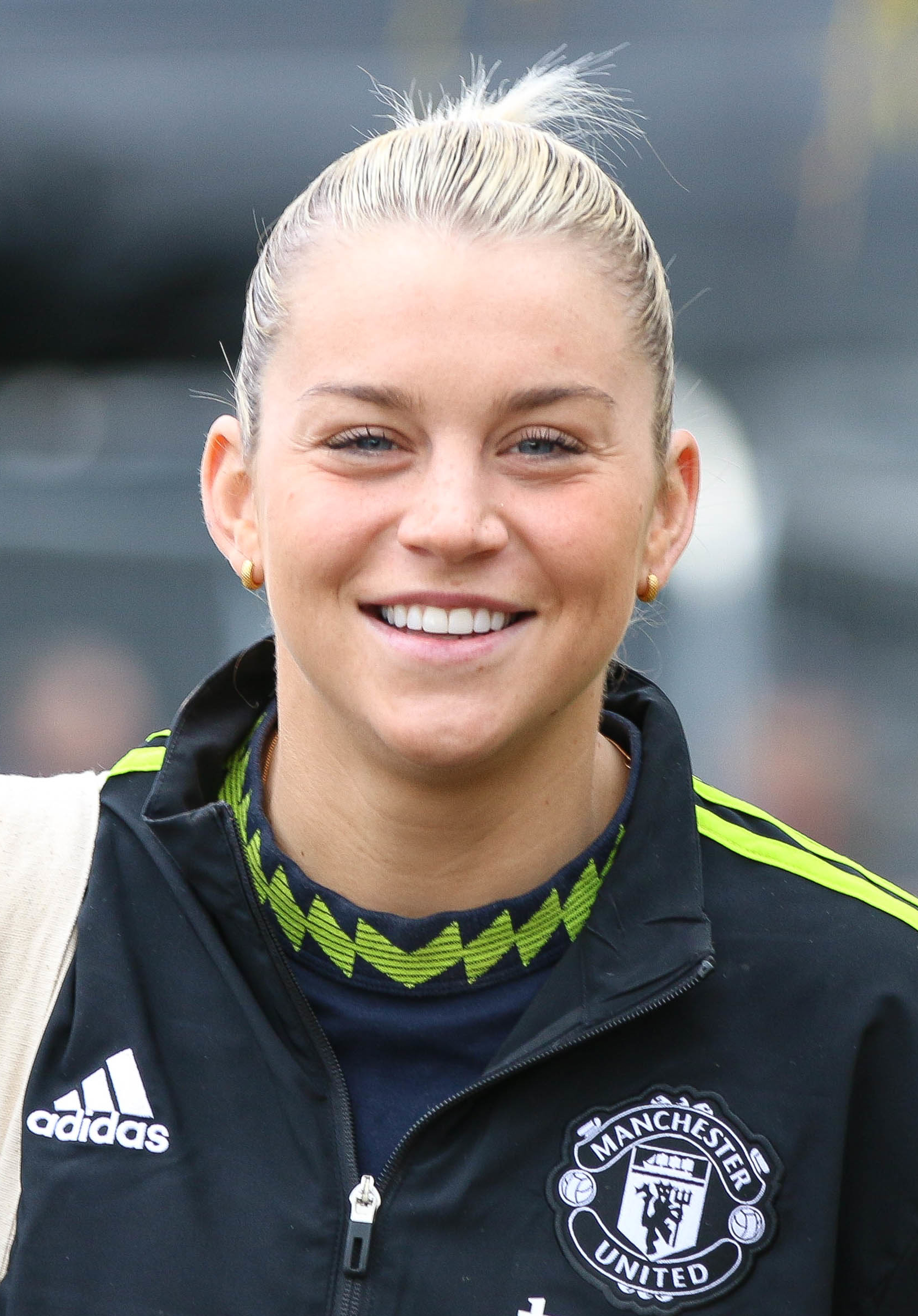
Alessia Russo

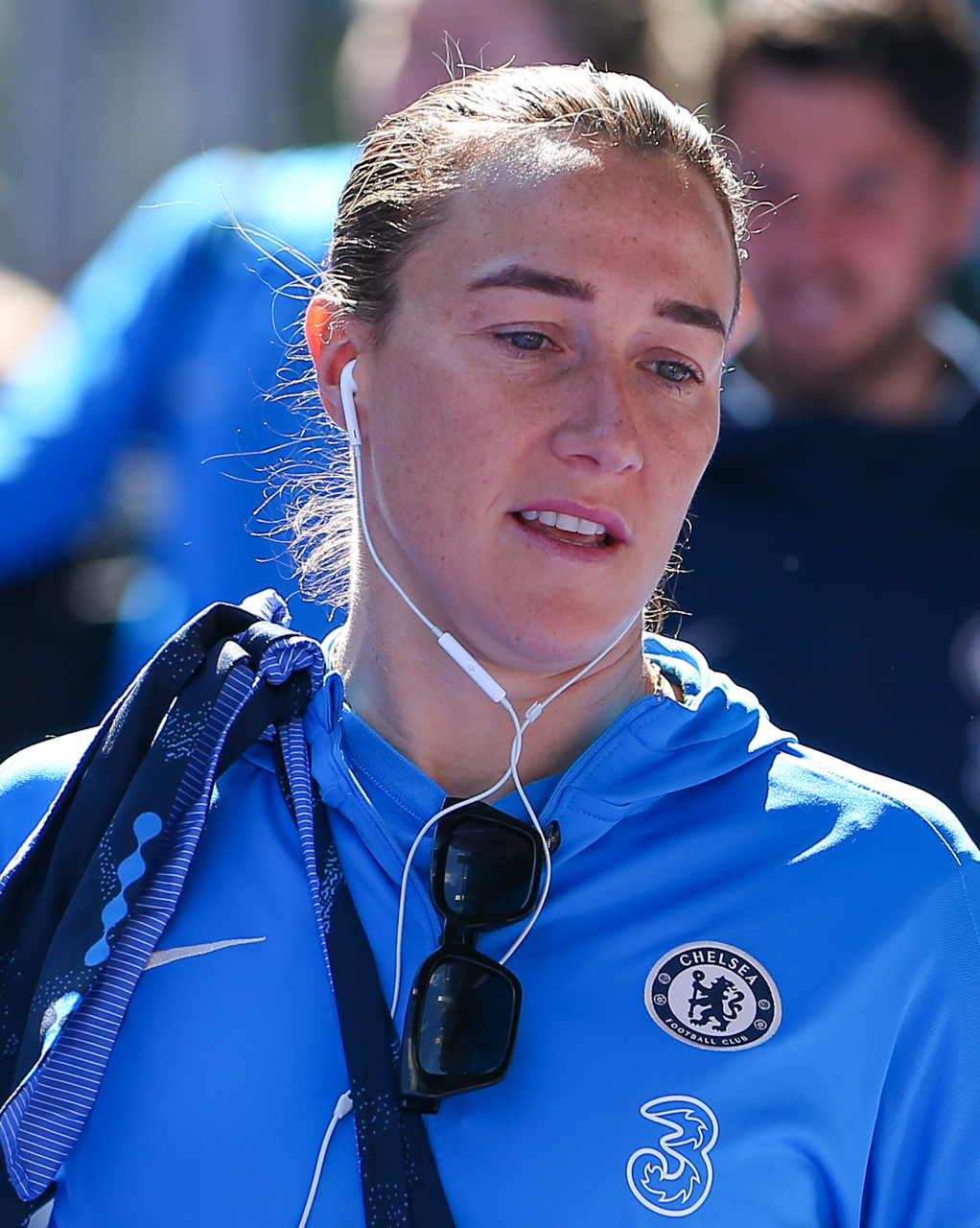
Lucy Bronze

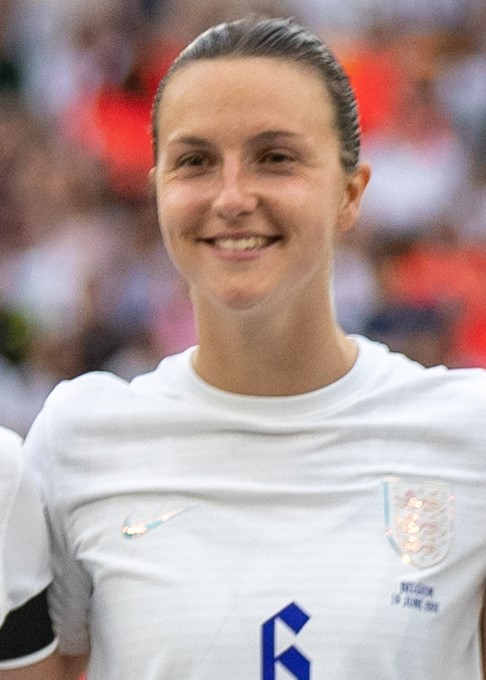
Lotte Wubben-Moy

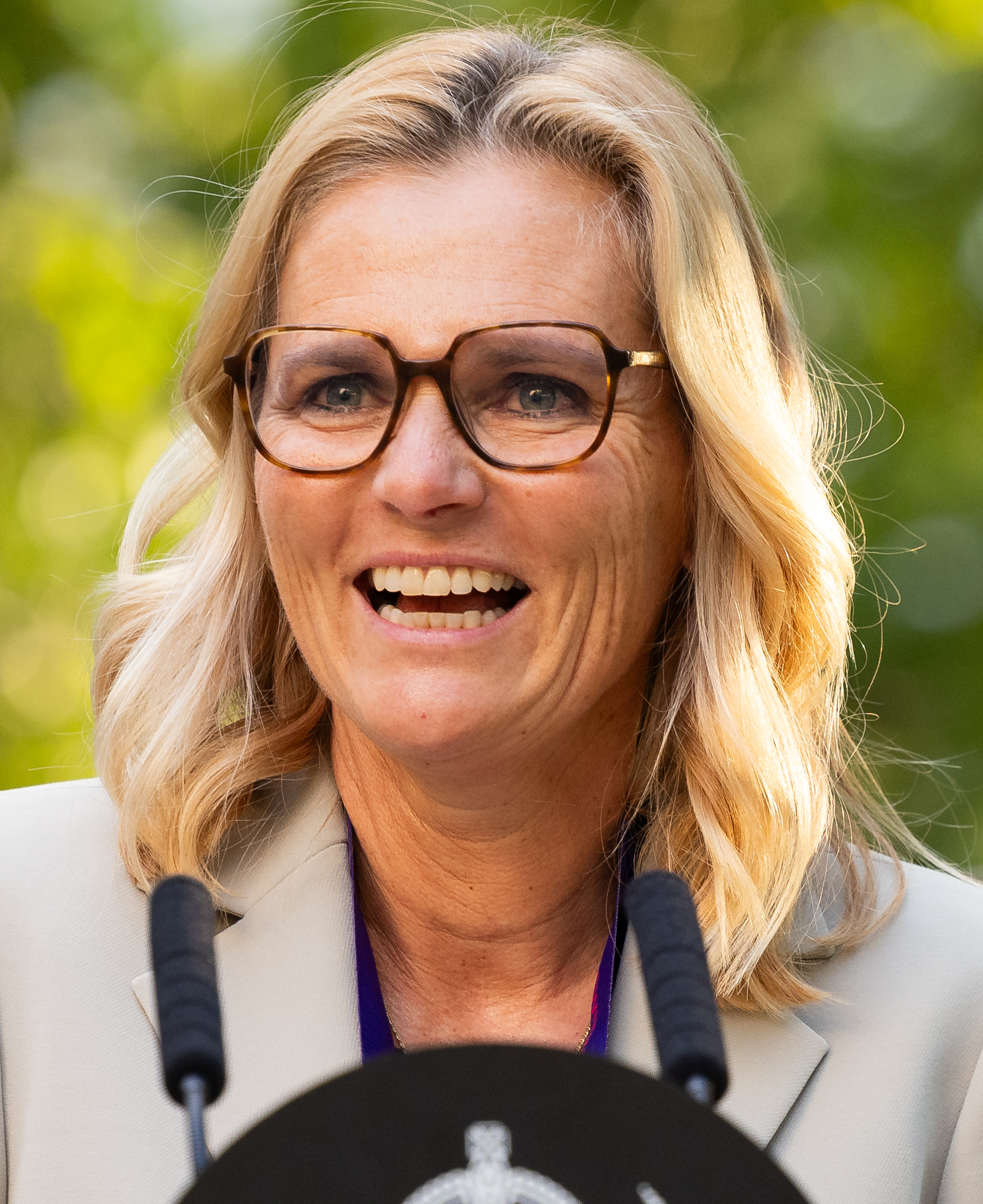
Sarina Wiegman

Name	Class	Major	Notability
Ryan Adeleye	2008		Israeli-American professional soccer player
Yael Averbuch	2008	Psychology	U.S. Women's National Team soccer player
Gregg Berhalter			Professional soccer player
Lucy Bronze			England women's national team footballer
Alessia Russo			England women's national team footballer
Chris Carrieri			Professional soccer player
Lori Chalupny	2006		U.S. Women's National Team soccer player
Matt Crawford	2003	Biology	Professional soccer player
Crystal Dunn	2013	Sociology	U.S Women's National Team soccer player
Whitney Engen	2010		U.S Women's National Team soccer player
Lorrie Fair			U.S Women's National Team soccer player
Michael Farfan			Professional soccer player
Robyn Gayle	2008		Canada Women's National Team soccer player
Jordan Graye	2010		Professional soccer player
Mia Hamm	1993	Political science	U.S Women's National Team soccer player
Ashlyn Harris	2009	Communications	U.S. Women's National Team soccer player
Tobin Heath	2010	Communications	U.S. Women's National Team soccer player
April Heinrichs	1986	Radio, television and motion picture	U.S Women's National Team soccer player
Meghan Klingenberg	2011		U.S. Women's National Team soccer player
Chris Leitch			Professional soccer player
Eric Lichaj			Professional soccer player
Kristine Lilly	1992		U.S. Women's National Team soccer player
Allie Long	2009		U.S. Women's National Team Soccer player
Kealia Ohai	2013		Professional soccer player
Heather O'Reilly	2006		U.S. Women's National Team soccer player
Cindy Parlow Cone			U.S. Women's National Team soccer player; soccer coach
Logan Pause	2007	Economics	Professional soccer player
Eddie Pope			Professional soccer player
Eddie Robinson			Professional soccer player
David Stokes	2009	Communications	Professional soccer player
Carey Talley			Professional soccer player
Lindsay Tarpley	2005		U.S. Women's National Team soccer player
David Testo	2009	Management & society	Professional soccer player
Nikki Washington	2011	Communications	Professional soccer player
Cat Whitehill	2003		United States Women's National Team soccer player
Sarina Wiegman			Dutch women's national team footballer, former manager of the Dutch women’s national team, Manager of the English women’s national team
Sheanon Williams			Professional soccer player
Lotte Wubben-Moy			England women's national team footballer
Kerry Zavagnin	2000	Exercise & sports science	Professional soccer player

=== Golf ===
Name	Class	Major	Notability
Donna Andrews	1989	Business administration	Professional golfer
Raymond Floyd			Professional golfer
Meaghan Francella	2005	Communications	Professional golfer
Casey Grice			Professional golfer
Cathy Johnston			Professional golfer
Davis Love III			Professional golfer
Ashley Prange			Professional golfer
Harvie Ward	1951	Economics	Amateur golfer
Mark Wilson	1997	Mathematics	Professional golfer

=== Sports administrators ===
Name	Class	Major	Notability
J Batt	2004 / Grad.	Journalism & mass communications / sports administration	Athletic director at Georgia Tecn (2022–2025), Michigan State (2025–2026), and Kentucky (2026–present); played on UNC's 2001 men's soccer national championship team
Jim Delany	1970 / Grad.	Political science / law	Commissioner of the Big Ten Conference (1989–2020)
Mike Hill	1990		Athletic director at UNC Charlotte
Mitch Kupchak	1976	Political science / psychology	Professional basketball player and general manager of the Los Angeles Lakers
Ryan McDonough	2002	Journalism	General manager of the Phoenix Suns
Danny Morrison	Grad.	Education administration & supervision	President of the Carolina Panthers
John Swofford	1971	Psychology	Commissioner of the Atlantic Coast Conference (1997–2021)
Norwood Teague	1988	Political science	Former athletic director at the University of Minnesota
Malcolm Turner		Business	Athletic director at Vanderbilt University
Travis Tygart	1993	Philosophy	CEO of the United States Anti-Doping Agency
Donnie Walsh	1962 / Grad.	Political science / law	Former president of New York Knicks, former CEO of Indiana Pacers

=== Track and field ===
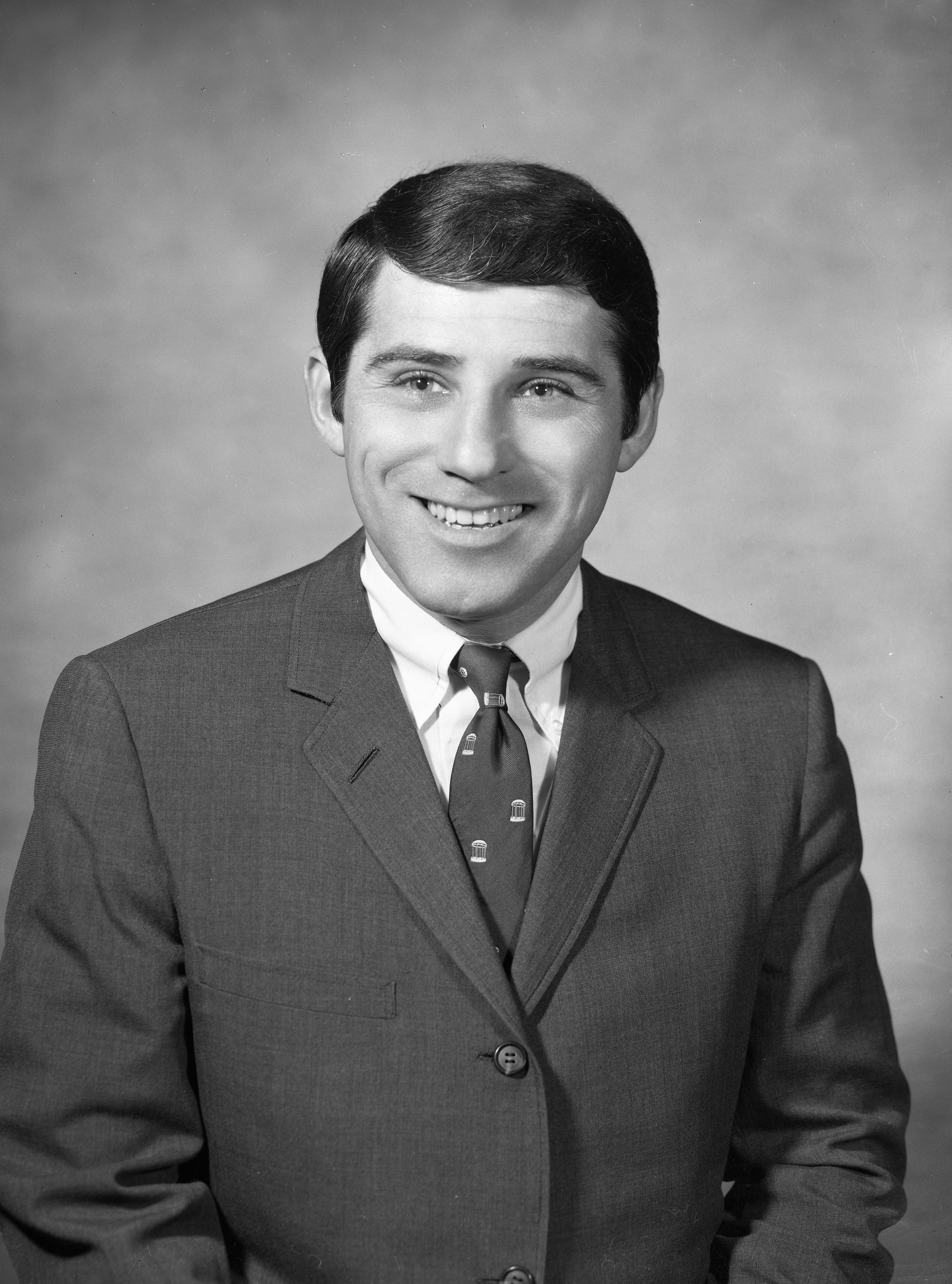
Jim Beatty

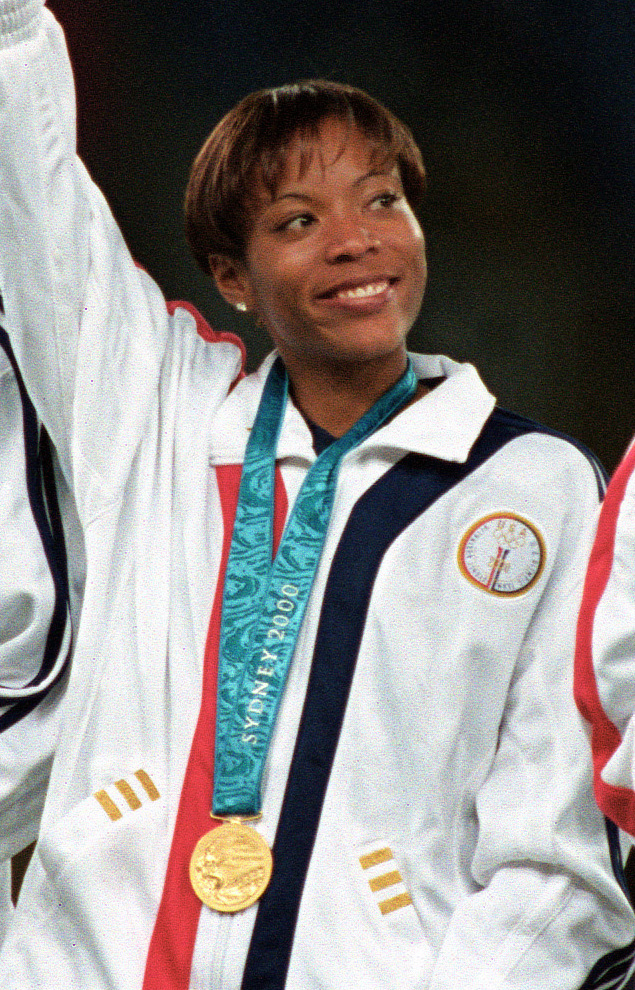
LaTasha Colander

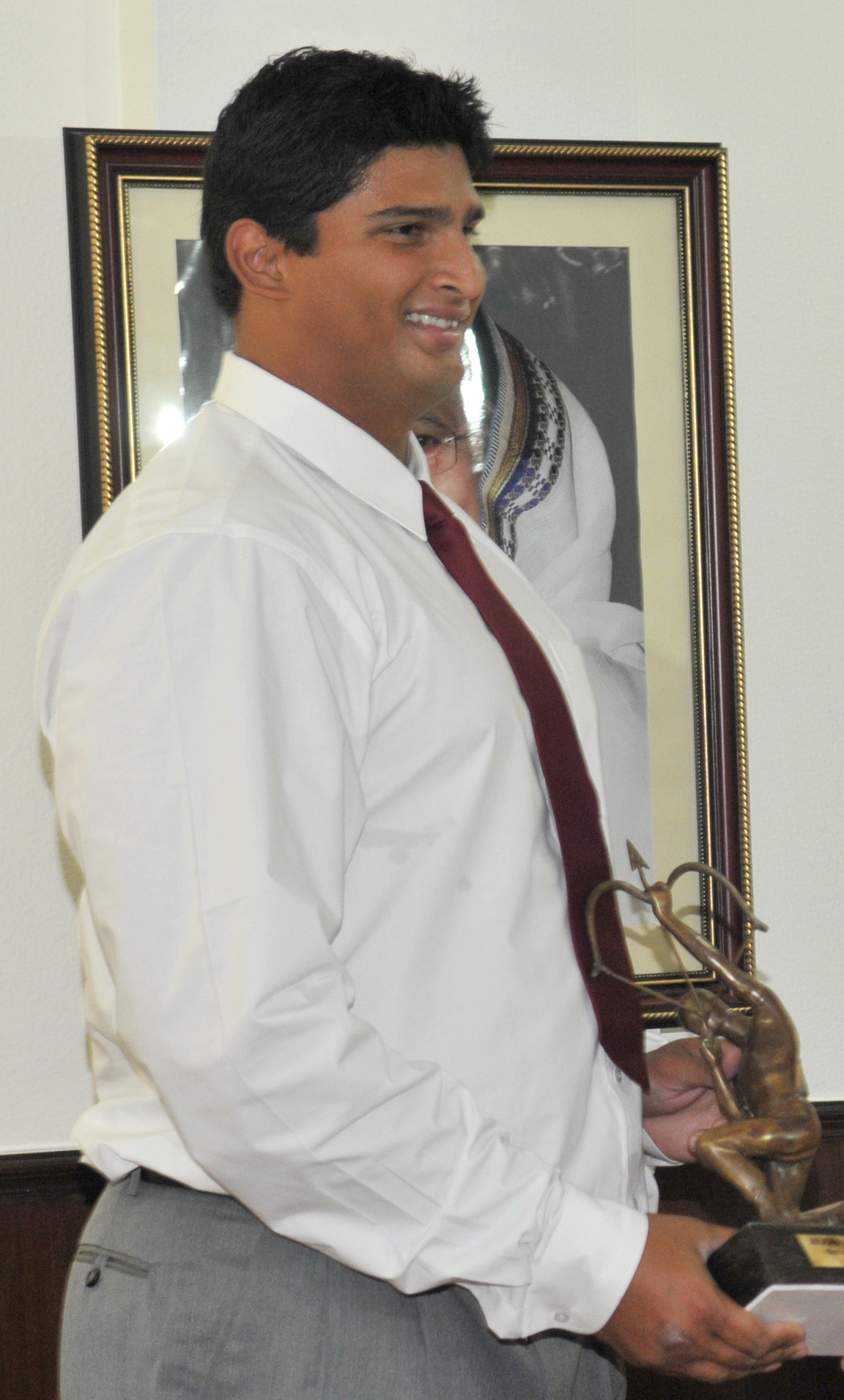
Vikas Gowda

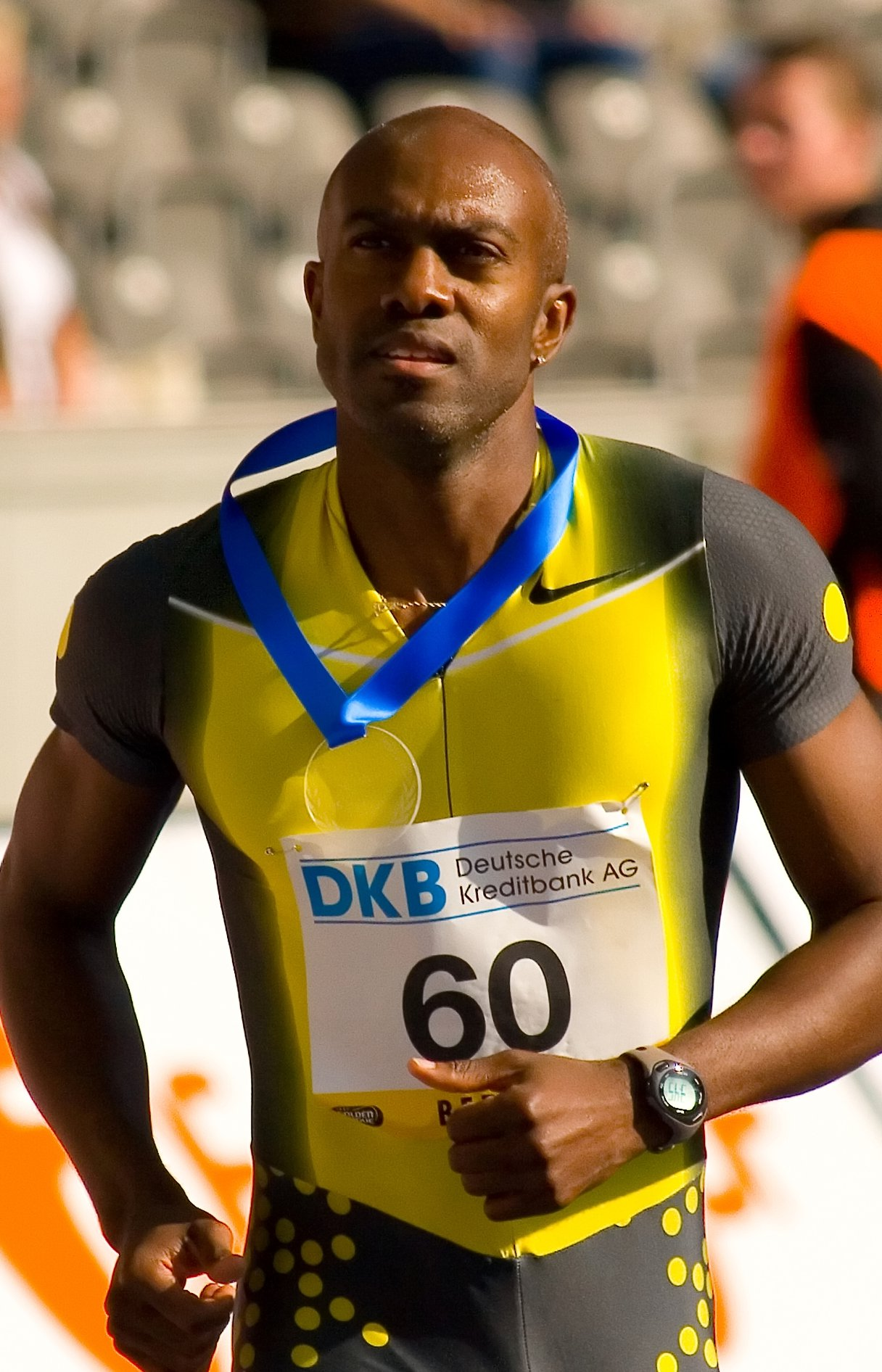
Allen Johnson

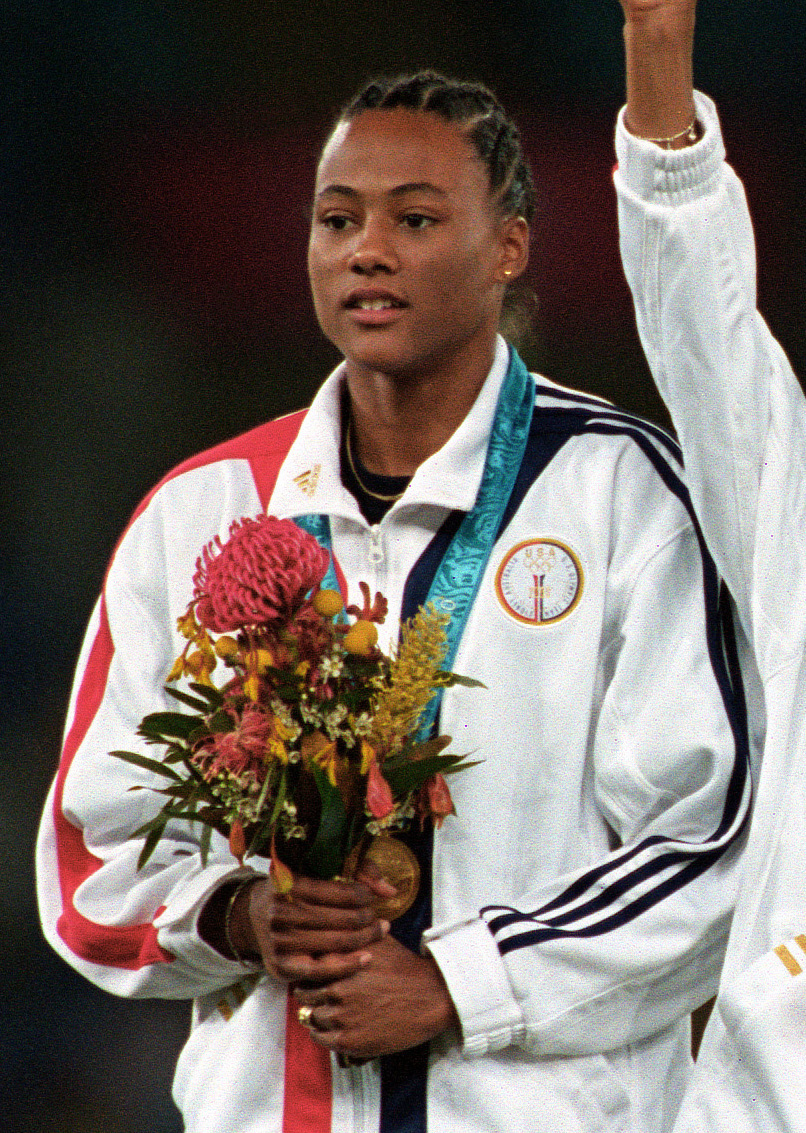
Marion Jones

Name	Class	Major	Notability
Jim Beatty			First person to run a four-minute mile indoors
Samuel Bryan	2010		Steeplechase
LaTasha Colander	1998	Communications	Former track and field athlete
Dominic Demeritte	1999	Economics	Former track and field athlete
Shalane Flanagan	2004		Long-distance runner
Vikas Gowda	2006		Gold medalist 2014 Commonwealth Games in discus throw
Allen Johnson			Former track and field athlete
Marion Jones			Former track and field athlete and professional basketball player
Earl Owens			Professional runner and triathlete
Alice Schmidt	2004		Middle-distance runner
Ola Sesay	2001		Long jumper
Tony Waldrop	1974 / Grad.	Political science / physiology	Gold medalist, 1975 Pan American Games in the 1500 meter; president of the University of South Alabama

=== Other sports ===
Name	Class	Major	Notability
Rachel Dawson	2007		Field hockey
Katelyn Falgowski	2011		Field hockey
Shalane Flanagan	2004		Distance runner
John Friedberg	1984		Olympic fencer; NCAA champion
Rinky Hijikata			Professional tennis player
Rob Koll	1989	Speech	College wrestling coach
Jamie Loeb		Sports administration	NCAA singles champion; professional tennis player
Sanaz Marand	2010	Psychology	Professional tennis player
Richie Meade	1976 / Grad.		College lacrosse coach
Nick Monroe			Professional tennis player
Bill Roy	Grad.		U.S. Olympic and world champion skeet shooter; professor of English at United States Air Force Academy
Vic Seixas	1949		Tennis player, International Tennis Hall of Fame
Amy Swensen	2002		Field hockey
Naya Tapper	2016	Exercise and Sport Science	Rugby player; U.S. Olympic sevens team
Peter Warfield	1971		Rugby player; England national team
Cindy Werley			U.S. Olympic field hockey player

== Miscellaneous ==
Name	Class	Major	Notability
Robert D. Atkinson	Grad.	City and regional planning	President of the Information Technology and Innovation Foundation
Rye Barcott	2001	Peace, war, and defense	Founder of Carolina for Kibera
Christine Burckle	1988	Mathematics	Brigadier general, retired assistant adjutant general - Air - Utah Air National Guard
Eve Carson	2008	Biology and political science	Student body president; murdered in 2008
Laura M. Dickey	1990	Law	US Coast Guard Rear Admiral
Julia Compton Moore	1950		Wife of Hal Moore
Charles Moose	1975	History	Former police chief of Montgomery County, Maryland; investigated Beltway snipers in 2002
Johnston Pettigrew	1847	Arts & sciences	Confederate general in the American Civil War who participated in Pickett's Charge
Jonathan Reckford		Political science	CEO of Habitat for Humanity International
Hunter Scott	2007	Economics / physics	Researcher on history of USS Indianapolis
Joey Tynch	1987	Business Administration	Rear admiral of the United States Navy
George D. Webster	1940 / Grad.	Arts & sciences	Brigadier general in the Marine Corps

== Faculty ==
- Penny Abernathy
- Jonathan Abramowitz
- Marilyn McCord Adams
- Maynard Adams
- Robert Merrihew Adams
- Dorothy Adkins
- Robert S. Adler
- Harry E. Ahles
- Kristy M. Ainslie
- Susan Grey Akers
- Howard E. Aldrich
- Virgil Aldrich
- Eben Alexander
- Nancy Allbritton
- Trey Allen
- Walter R. Allen
- Jennifer Alley
- Bernhard Anderson
- Daniel Anderson
- James H. Anderson
- James M. Anderson
- Jessica Anderson
- Naomi André
- Kenneth Andrews
- C. Edson Armi
- Lester Asheim
- Idris Assani
- Daphne Athas

== Coaches ==
=== Football head coaches ===
Tenure	Coach	Years	Record	Pct.
1889	Hector Cowan	1	1–1	.500
1893	William J. "Yup" Cook	1	3–4	.429
1894	V. K. Irvine	1	6–3	.667
1895	T. C. Trenchard	1	7–1–1	.833
1896	Gordon Johnston	1	3–4–1	.438
1897–1900	W. A. Reynolds	4	27–7–4	.763
1901	Charles O. Jenkins	1	7–2	.778
1902–1903	H. S. Olcott	2	11–4–3	.694
1904	R. R. Brown	1	5–2–2	.667
1905	William Warner	1	4–3–1	.563
1906	W. S. Keinholz	1	1–4–2	.286
1907	Otis Lamson	1	4–4–1	.500
1908	Edward Green	1	3–3–3	.500
1909–1910	A. E. Brides	2	8–8	.500
1911	Branch Bocock	1	6–1–1	.813
1912	C. W. Martin	1	3–4–1	.438
1913–1915	T. C. Trenchard	3	19–8–1	.696
1916–1919	Thomas Campbell	2	9–7–1	.559
1920	M. E. Fuller	1	2–6	.250
1921–1925	Bill Fetzer	5	30–12–4	.696
1926–1933	Chuck Collins	8	38–31–9	.545
1934–1935	Carl Snavely	2	15–2–1	.833
1936–1941	Raymond Wolf	6	38–17–3	.681
1942	Jim Tatum	1	5–2–2	.667
1943	Tom Young	1	6–3	.667
1944	Gene McEver	1	1–7–1	.167
1945–1952	Carl Snavely	8	44–33–4	.568
1953–1955	George Barclay	3	11–18–1	.383
1956–1958	Jim Tatum	3	12–15–1	.429
1959–1966	Jim Hickey	8	36–45	.444
1967–1977	Bill Dooley	11	69–53–2	.565
1978–1987	Dick Crum	10	72–41–3	.634
1988–1997	Mack Brown	10	69–46–1	.599
1998–2000	Carl Torbush	3	17–18	.486
2001–2006	John Bunting	6	27–45	.375
2007–2010	Butch Davis	4	12–23	.343
2011	Everett Withers	1	7–6	.538
2012–2018	Larry Fedora	7	45–43	.511
2019–2024	Mack Brown	6	44–31	.587
2025-	Bill Belichick	0	0-0	–
