= 23XI Racing v. NASCAR =

2025 NASCAR antitrust trial

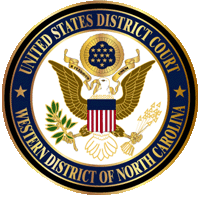
- Court: United States District Court for the Western District of North Carolina
- Full case name: 23XI Racing & Front Row Motorsports v. NASCAR
- Decided: December 11, 2025
- Defendant: NASCAR
- Plaintiffs: 23XI Racing; Front Row Motorsports

Holding
- The two sides came to a settlement on December 11, 2025 which allowed for evergreen charters for all teams going forward. Teams have a greater say over changes to the sport. Undisclosed monetary damages paid to the suing teams.

Court membership
- Judge sitting: Judge Kenneth Bell

23XI Racing & FRM v. NASCAR was a civil lawsuit filed in late 2024 and settled on December 11, 2025. In the case, two NASCAR Cup Series teams 23XI Racing and Front Row Motorsports alleged antitrust violations by NASCAR.

The trial began on December 1, 2025. The teams sought change in NASCAR's business practices, claiming they are monopolistic. Another separate but key part of the two teams' legal battle with NASCAR was over an injunction request for them to compete as chartered entries during the 2025 season before the December trial was held. Kenneth D. Bell, a judge of the United States District Court for the Western District of North Carolina (the state where the NASCAR industry is based), was the presiding judge over the case. The legal case ended in settlement.

== Background ==
Beginning in 2016, the majority of teams running the full season schedule of what is now the NASCAR Cup Series and NASCAR came to an agreement. Team owners would be issued a charter, an in exchange NASCAR would provide a guaranteed starting spot in each race, guaranteed purse (reward) money, and other benefits. The charter concept is modeled after the Concorde Agreement in Formula 1. The initial charter agreement ran through the 2020 season and was extended to 2024 to match the end of NASCAR's current media rights agreement with little fanfare or discussion between NASCAR and the teams.

Negotiations for the next charter agreement began in late 2022. Once NASCAR secured its next media rights deal in 2023, negotiations increased in frequency. Teams occasionally spoke to the media to say negotiations were not going well, while NASCAR refused any comment on the negotiation process.

After two years of negotiations, NASCAR issued a "take it or leave it" offer for the teams, represented by the Race Team Alliance, to sign by September 6, two days before the first race of the 2024 playoffs at Atlanta Motor Speedway. Teams felt "threatened and coerced" to sign the new agreement by the deadline, according to people who spoke on the condition of anonymity to The Associated Press. One of the biggest reasons the teams did not sign on to the new agreement was because charters would not be made permanent. NASCAR Chairman and CEO Jim France was especially against the charter system being made permanent. However, aside from 23XI and Front Row Motorsports, all other teams planning to return in 2025 did sign the new deal, claiming they had no choice and could not risk their teams going out of business and having to shut down operations.

== Pre–trial ==
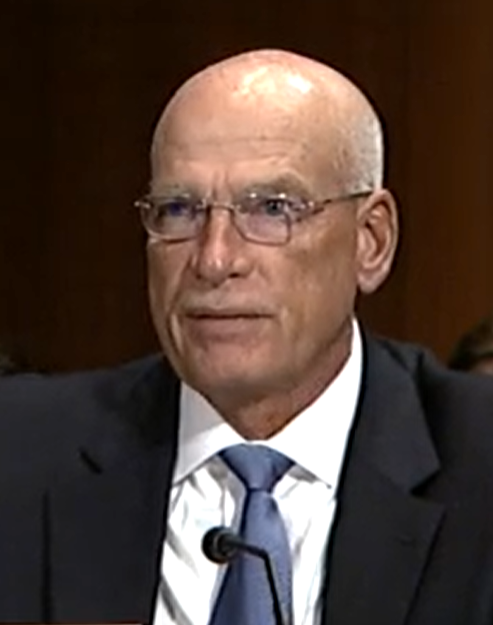
United States district court judge Kenneth Bell, who presided over arguments of the case.

On October 2, 2024, it was announced that 23XI Racing, along with Front Row Motorsports, filed an antitrust lawsuit against NASCAR over the terms of the updated charter agreement, as well as anti-competitive practices committed by the France family. 23XI and Front Row were represented by sports attorney Jeffrey L. Kessler.

On December 18, both teams were granted a motion of preliminary injunction, allowing them to race as chartered entries in 2025 while continuing their legal battle with NASCAR. The injunction also allowed the transfer of two Stewart–Haas Racing charters to both teams (23XI and Front Row each purchased 1 charter from SHR after the team closed down; the third SHR charter to be transferred went to Trackhouse Racing).

However, on June 5, 2025, the U.S. Court of Appeals for the 4th Circuit overturned the preliminary injunction ruling. After the teams' request for a rehearing on the injunction was denied, 23XI and Front Row had to begin competing as open teams starting at the race at Dover Motor Speedway in July. As a result, the six cars from the two teams, the No. 4 of Noah Gragson, No. 23 of Bubba Wallace, No. 34 of Todd Gilliland, No. 35 of Riley Herbst, No. 38 of Zane Smith and No. 45 of Tyler Reddick, would not have guaranteed entry in any remaining races if over 40 cars would attempt to qualify for a race and would also receive significantly less purse money in each race. However, NASCAR did modify its qualification rules to ensure the impacted teams would still qualify for all remaining 2025 races while the case was being decided.

On August 25, NASCAR filed a legal notice of its agreement to issue one of the charters to a redacted entity. Also at that time, Reddick gave the team a breach of contract notice as a result of the lawsuit. On August 28, another hearing for an injunction to have both teams gain their chartered status back for the remainder of the 2025 season was held, and it included the revealing of text messages from NASCAR executives as well as 23XI team executives had against the other side. After the hearing, Kessler and 23XI owners Michael Jordan and Denny Hamlin spoke with the media. Jordan stated that "If I have to fight this to the end for the betterment of the sport, I will do it." On September 3, the courts denied the 23XI/FRM motion for preliminary injunction.

On October 7, NASCAR asked the court to order a settlement conference. On October 8, Judge Bell ordered both parties to participate in a settlement conference on October 21 with mediator Jeffrey Mishkin. On October 21, both parties met for a settlement conference. No agreement was reached, but both sides met again for further discussions on October 22. As part of the lawsuit process, the 2025 charter agreement became public on October 29. On December 1, 2025, the jury was selected and included six men and three women. Although there were some minor hiccups during jury selection due to their fandom for either side.

Just prior to trial starting, Judge Bell warned trial "could tear NASCAR apart" and urged settlement. No settlement was reached and trail began.

== Trial ==
=== Day 1 ===
On December 1, the trial started. After the jury was selected, Hamlin took the stand as the first witness and told the jury that he and other NASCAR team owners are "essentially just professional fundraisers" due to NASCAR's business model. 23XI had to generate $45 million in sponsorship revenue just to make a minor profit, but they were the exception, Hamlin testified. "The difficult part is coming up with tens of millions just to break even," Hamlin said. "Your costs (as an owner) aren't covered to put on (NASCAR's) show." He further emphasized that without Jordan's ability to pull in major sponsors and close deals, his team would not be profitable. "If I couldn't be successful with Michael as a partner, I was never going to make this work," he stated.

Kessler explained why NASCAR and its controlling France family fit the definition of abusing their monopoly power, outlining a roadmap of evidence he claims will show NASCAR tied up the racetracks and race cars and restricted the eligibility of teams to illegally maintain their monopoly. He compared the teams' situation to wanting to be a nurse for a career but having only one hospital to work at, with that hospital setting a below-market salary. The nurse's choice would be to "accept what they pay you or don't be a nurse." Kessler noted FRM owner Bob Jenkins has not made a profit for his race team in the 20 years he's been competing in NASCAR. Kessler said he plans to show evidence that the France family itself has received almost US$400 million in a recent three-year period.

Meanwhile, NASCAR attorney John E. Stephenson said the teams were suing as a result of failed negotiations, not for an actual antitrust claim. The France family built NASCAR from the ground up through hard work, innovation, and risk-taking, Stephenson said, an "American success story that shouldn't result in a lawsuit, but in admiration." Stephenson said race teams on average generated a combined US$640 million in sponsor dollars per year and were receiving US$431 million from the new media rights deal and the sport's charter system, which guarantees certain revenues to teams. "If charters are so bad, why do great businessmen keep buying and investing in them?, If charters are so bad, why do they want to make them permanent?"

=== Day 2 ===
On December 2, 2025, Day 2 of the trial started. Hamlin returned to the stand for cross-examination by NASCAR's other attorney, Lawrence Buterman. Hamlin first relayed how, in 2023, he had expressed concerns about the negotiations for the 2025 charter agreement to Steve Phelps, who advised Hamlin to speak with Jim France. Hamlin said he spotted France eating alone at lunch during NASCAR Awards Week in Nashville, so Hamlin joined France and came away "very, very discouraged" by their conversation. "He told me directly the problem in NASCAR is teams spend too much money," Hamlin recounted, adding France said teams should only be spending US$10 million per season to run their cars rather than the current US$20 million average. Hamlin responded, "We've cut this grass so short, we're down to the dirt," and said it was not realistic to cut costs in half. He then added that he told France he was "not trying to be a statistic, like the many owners who have gone out of business". Hamlin asked France how he could recoup his investment in the sport, to which he said, "he had no answer".

Hamlin rejected the notion that NASCAR was doing teams a favor by offering a renewable seven-year term on the 2025 charter agreements because it locked teams into a dollar amount with no negotiations rather than a percentage of the next media rights deal. "We will not be in business if we sign this within 10 years. This is essentially my team's death certificate for the future," he said. Hamlin was then asked if bringing a lawsuit in response was the right decision in light of the charter negotiations. Hamlin said, "I think it was the only decision. It's time for change. All I knew is we were right and what they did was wrong." Hamlin said, "23XI's profit margin was 2.26 percent, and one sponsor away from having all this profit gone." His most optimistic goal, as stated in documents, was to reach a 10 percent profit margin. However, under cross-examination, Buterman asked if Hamlin thought it was fair to be asking the jury for US$205 million in damages (a 900 percent return on Hamlin's investment, Buterman noted) to which Hamlin struggled to answer and told Buterman, "We want to be made whole for what you guys did to us."

After Hamlin's testimony, the teams put NASCAR executive vice president Scott Prime, who heads NASCAR's strategy, on the witness stand. Kessler began to build his case for NASCAR's anticompetitive practices by using Prime's strategy memos and presentation decks to show how NASCAR was concerned about a possible LIV Golf-type situation in stock car racing. Kessler showed NASCAR's options to counter a potential breakaway series included a strengthened relationship with track ownership company Speedway Motorsports, which ended up coming to fruition (though Prime denied any knowledge of NASCAR's sanction agreements with the SMI racetracks). Las Vegas Motor Speedway carried a two-year exclusivity clause beyond the term of the agreement. Kessler then showed a document from Prime that planned for a meeting between senior executives and France which laid out two pathways the first of which was "NASCAR has all the leverage and the teams will almost have to sign the terms we put in front of them." Prime said he disagreed with that path and pushed for a compromise with the teams, which other executives agreed with.

Then text messages from Phelps citing a chart that had "zero wins for teams", and then Steve O'Donnell saying the lack of support for the teams would result in a "1998, Fuck the teams dictatorship, redneck, Southern, tiny sport." Prime denied on the stand and said, "From my point of view, where we landed was strong for the teams and progress had been made from the day of the frustrated text messages."

=== Day 3 ===
On December 3, 2025, day 3 of the trial started. Prime returned to the stand. Kessler used Prime's emails and corporate communications to paint a picture of what he said were NASCAR's monopolistic abuses. Prime originally worked for consulting firm McKinsey, during which he prepared a 2014 report expressing "concerns over the longevity of the sport" if NASCAR did not take steps to improve the health of its race teams. One such step in his report included taxi-like "medallions" which ultimately came to fruition in NASCAR's charter system. Kessler noted how despite the charter system's existence, teams are hamstrung by a weak negotiating position and stuck in unfavorable terms when it comes to renewing charters because they have nowhere else to go. He also mentioned a 2019 letter from one team that asked for a better business model with more sustainable revenues to aid in teams' viability, which Prime acknowledged: "We presented the offer, and they accepted it."

Kessler interjected, "You're a monopoly! There's no place else to compete. There was no place else for them to go, correct?" Prime responded with, "NASCAR is the premier stock car racing series today, yes." One of the emails from Prime to other executives during the 2024 charter negotiations relayed four demands from the race teams. He found these "quite disappointing" because the teams said they would be "forced to recommit our energy to exploring all our options if NASCAR did not agree." One of the options was to create a panic among the teams, updating the charter language to NASCAR's liking and then offering a take-it-or-leave-it deadline to sign, dissolving the charter system altogether, or taking all of the cars in-house and eliminating the need for race teams. "You accurately reflected our options," Phelps responded to Prime in an email. "They are playing with fire. Lots of options, but all have the same theme: Pick a date and they can sign or lose their charters. It is that simple." Kessler claimed, "Only a monopolist could say this. Only a monopolist has the power to say, 'Take my offer, and if you don't take it, you will no longer be in this business, and someone else will take your place."

Ultimately, when NASCAR presented a "take-it-or-leave-it offer to teams" on Sept. 6, 2024, Prime described it as "a gun to your head", though he did not favor that as he wanted to strike a fair deal with teams. "That's what Jim wanted," Kessler said. "I don't know what he wanted," Prime replied. Prime wrote via text after one meeting, "No bueno with Jim on charters. Can say O'Donnell and I put our best foot forward, but it was a brick wall." Phelps responded, "I'm sorry to hear this. Super disappointing." Kessler also brought up NASCAR's "goodwill provision" in its charter agreements, which says any owner of a race team even a minority owner of only 10 percent may not own a team nor invest in a competing stock car series. He then called it a "non-compete" agreement, which Prime disagreed with. "It's not goodwill, it's anti-competitive will. Shouldn't that be the name?" Kessler said. NASCAR's attorneys objected to that statement, and it was sustained. But Kessler kept going and cited a provision's clause that states even if a charter team leaves NASCAR or simply forfeits the charter, it still cannot join a competitor series for more than a year. "And you think that's goodwill?" Kessler said. "I do," Prime responded. Later, under cross-examination, Prime said the teams' demand of US$20 million per car in revenue payouts would "bankrupt NASCAR" and denied the earlier communications were a sign of ill intent on NASCAR's part. Prime said the idea of permanent charters did not make sense for anyone. "You can't negotiate a deal and have the exact same deal forever. You can't write a contract today that's going to last forever,"

Jenkins took the stand as the third witness. Jenkins told the jury how his two-decade journey as a NASCAR Cup Series team owner had never ended in an operational profit for any year, resulting in an average loss of US$6.8 million per season and a loss of US$8 million in 2022 alone, followed by another US$5.7 million loss the next year. Jenkins told the jury he is a lifelong race fan whose business success in other ventures has allowed him to remain in NASCAR as "the team that has done the most with the least despite losing tens of millions of dollars in stock car racing". That's where his in this lawsuit came in. Jenkins said "I can assure you it's not from malpractice, We're very frugal." Jenkins has persisted as a team owner not because charter agreements are fair but "based on the belief someday they will be fair. If we ever do get it right, NASCAR teams will be valuable," he said. The other team told Jenkins they did not want to sign it either, with a sudden deadline on Sept. 6, 2024. They were apologetic, He said, "They knew they had to blindly sign it or not. They can't walk away from their investments. You can't turn a race shop into a warehouse."

Buterman was skeptical of Jenkins' money-losing claims and accused the owner of hiding expenses that could have otherwise made FRM's finances look better. For example, in five races this season, Jenkins put Long John Silver's on what would otherwise be unsponsored cars. Buterman said that equated to Jenkins "giving your children millions of dollars in free advertising". But Jenkins explained he will not run a blank car in a race because it's bad for business, and his company only puts one of Jenkins' family businesses on a car when no sponsor can be found in time for the event. Buterman then questioned why Jenkins only pays his drivers 8.5 percent of team revenues while claiming NASCAR underpaid the teams with 25 percent of revenues. Jenkins called it apples and oranges, saying teams have far more costs than other sports, like their US$350,000 race cars. "You don't wreck a US$350,000 basketball," he said of NBA teams' costs.

=== Day 4 ===
On December 4, 2025, day 4 of the trial started. NASCAR successfully got Jenkins to admit the US$20 million cost per car figure used in this lawsuit. "The median cost is US$20 million; the fact I can do it for less helps me reduce my costs," Jenkins said. Jenkins' cost per car was closer to US$14 million than US$20 million in 2023, though Jenkins said his smaller team's goal was to run as leanly as possible. Buterman also showed the jury how Jenkins had included some of his Truck Series team losses in the overall profit/loss chart, which Buterman said was misleading for a trial about the Cup Series. Jenkins acknowledged this but said "the Truck team's impact on his bottom line was minimal."

Buterman also painted Jenkins' complaints about NASCAR's "take it or leave it" charter offer at 5 p.m. on a Friday night as hypocritical, noting Jenkins himself had used such a strategy with Denny Hamlin while the two pondered a possible merger between their teams in 2021. "We can't keep negotiating this forever...That's why we decided we had to have a deal by 5 p.m. (Friday)." Jenkins wrote in a text to Hamlin. Jenkins said it was "another analogy that doesn't work because Hamlin had other options, unlike NASCAR pressuring teams into signing something as a monopolist. The gun was not to his head."

Steve O'Donnell was the fourth to take the stand. O'Donnell acknowledged he had thought through a variety of options NASCAR's car owners could pursue after a contentious meeting with teams, which came at the height of conversations around the first season of LIV Golf and PGA Tour split in 2022. O'Donnell was worried teams could participate in a similar split, potentially building their own cars and partnering with SMI. In part to counter that move, O'Donnell presented various options to NASCAR's board of directors about partnering with SMI on multiyear sanctioning agreements, which ultimately included exclusivity clauses preventing other stock car series from racing at those venues. The exclusivity clauses extended to independent tracks where NASCAR's premier Cup Series races and included the tracks for lower national series. O'Donnell did not disagree when Kessler asked if NASCAR was a monopoly. But O'Donnell said the teams could compete as "open", non-charter teams if they did not like the proposed terms of NASCAR's charter agreement. Kessler argued "open" teams make far less than charter teams, which made such a decision financially unsustainable.

The jury was shown O'Donnell's notes from a March 2022 meeting with four team owner representatives, who told O'Donnell and other executives that the business model was broken for race teams. O'Donnell acknowledged that teams could go out of business if they lost a sponsor and said he understood there needed to be a model that was fair for everyone. "We knew the industry was challenged," he said. Polk told O'Donnell of three goals in that meeting: Maximize television revenue from an upcoming media rights deal, create a more competitive landscape, and look at the cost model for teams, including a potential cost cap and a way of limiting spending to even the playing field. NASCAR agreed with those goals, O'Donnell indicated. In that same meeting, Jeff Gordon asked NASCAR executive Ben Kennedy, "Do you believe the family is open to a new model?" Kennedy replied "yes". Although there was more money from media deals, the teams said Jim France was unwilling to budge on other key points.

"As it turned out, Jim France was not open to a new model, right?" Kessler asked O'Donnell. O'Donnell replied, "No." O'Donnell was presented with his own text messages expressing his frustration with France and the board. He said it was a general feeling about the state of the negotiations and not one directed at a specific individual. "Poor choice of words, I was very frustrated." O'Donnell said. Kessler attempted to get O'Donnell to pin those comments on France, asking, "Who is the dictator? Who is fucking the teams?" but O'Donnell refused to pin it on anybody. O'Donnell also walked back a message he wrote to Kennedy about Jim France's reaction to an email written by Heather Gibbs, a co-owner of Joe Gibbs Racing, which pleaded with the France family to see the light on giving teams permanent charters. Though O'Donnell wrote France was "swearing every other sentence" while reading Gibbs' letter aloud, he testified he was exaggerating and France never actually cursed while reading it. O'Donnell also refused to say what was on his handwritten notes from a February 2023 meeting, in which he wrote it was "difficult to try to be a step ahead with the existing board (of directors); legacy mindset hinders growth," were directed at anyone specifically. "I was hoping the future board would include the next generation and was hoping to see that change," O'Donnell testified.

Kessler then asked O'Donnell on his thoughts about the defunct Superstar Racing Experience that O'Donnell felt began to have the look and feel of NASCAR races and even used some NASCAR drivers. NASCAR blocked SRX from racing at SMI tracks by invoking its exclusivity clause, O'Donnell said, because "we were in a major negotiation for a new media rights deal, and we wanted to retain as much revenue as possible for the teams". But texts sent between O'Donnell and Phelps told a different story. "This is NASCAR. Pure and simple. Enough. We need legal to take a shot at this," O'Donnell wrote about SRX. "Need to put a knife in this trash series," Phelps responded.

== Settlement ==
On December 11, 2025, both parties settled. The settlement included both 23XI Racing and Front Row Motorsports receiving their six charters back and compensation for lost income from the previous races that were unchartered. Charters for all teams will be permanent. There will be a return to the "Three-Strike Rule," which allows teams to vote against three NASCAR proposals that would cost them money, and this has been increased to five. Teams will now see revenue from NASCAR’s international media rights deal, which was changed to an unknown amount. Teams will be paid one-third of any new NASCAR deals that involve the teams’ intellectual property usage, and NASCAR will also pay 23XI Racing and Front Row Motorsports an unknown amount of monetary damages.

The settlement also included: two-thirds of teams need to OK renewal of charters; if they don’t sign a renewal, they are still chartered and get a year or possibly more to sell the charter; if they don’t meet certain performance standards, they must sell but get time to sell; NASCAR gets 10% of the sale (it was 2%).

== Reaction & Fallout ==
Judge Bell applauded the settlement, implying the case was clearly in the teams favor before the case went to trial. "I wish we could have done this a few months ago," he said, adding, "I believe this is great for NASCAR. Great for the future of NASCAR. Great for the entity of NASCAR. Great for the teams and ultimately great for the fans." Judge Kenneth Bell would shortly oversee another NASCAR case, this one involving Kyle Busch and his wife Samantha alleging sponsor Pacific Life Company failed to meet sponsor obligations.

Immediately after the news of the settlement was announced, every NASCAR team owner released a positive statement or otherwise commented in a positive manner on how the case ended. Many gave expressions of optimism for the sport and stated how now that the case was behind them, all involved could move forward in growing the sport.

Prior to the case going to trial, NASCAR fan opinion was mixed on the case. Following the case, fan opinion was almost entirely on the side of the race teams. The in-trial reveal of hurtful, damaging messages against well liked team owner Richard Childress was particularly damaging. Many fans and prominent media voices called for top NASCAR executives involved - particularly Jim France & Steve Phelps - to immediately resign. Given NASCAR's governance structure, they could not be fired by a board or other bodies as is typical in most large American entities. Some called for Childress to open his own defamation suit against NASCAR leadership.

On January 6, 2026, NASCAR announced Steve Phelps would leave NASCAR. On April 24, 2026, Jim France stepped down as NASCAR CEO, though he will remain chairperson and majority owner.

Following the resignations, Steve O'Donnell was named the new President of NASCAR, the first time someone not in the France family would hold the role. Ben Kennedy, who some had suggested could become the next President of NASCAR, was named Chief Operating Officer.
