= 2020 GEICO 500 =

NASCAR Cup Series race

Race details
- Race 13 of 36 in the 2020 NASCAR Cup Series
- 2020 GEICO 500 program cover
- Date: June 22, 2020
- Location: Talladega Superspeedway in Lincoln, Alabama
- Course: Permanent racing facility
- Course length: 2.66 miles (4.28 km)
- Distance: 191 laps, 508.06 mi (817.48 km)
- Scheduled distance: 188 laps, 500.08 mi (804.64 km)
- Average speed: 146.933 miles per hour (236.466 km/h)

Pole position
Driver	Martin Truex Jr.	Joe Gibbs Racing
- Grid positions set by ballot

Most laps led
Driver	Ryan Blaney	Team Penske
- Laps: 63

Winner
No. 12	Ryan Blaney	Team Penske

Television in the United States
- Network: Fox
- Announcers: Mike Joy and Jeff Gordon
- Nielsen ratings: 3.300 million

Radio in the United States
- Radio: MRN
- Booth announcers: Alex Hayden and Jeff Striegle
- Turn announcers: Dave Moody (1 & 2), Mike Bagley (Backstretch) and Kurt Becker (3 & 4)

The 2020 GEICO 500 was a NASCAR Cup Series race held on June 22, 2020, at Talladega Superspeedway in Lincoln, Alabama. Contested over 191 laps—extended from 188 laps due to an overtime finish, on the 2.66 mile (4.28 km) superspeedway, it was the 13th race of the 2020 NASCAR Cup Series season.

The race was originally scheduled to be held on April 26, but was rescheduled due to the COVID-19 pandemic. In turn, the race was postponed from June 21 due to inclement weather.

== Report ==
=== Background ===
Talladega Superspeedway, the track where the race was held

Talladega Superspeedway, formerly known as Alabama International Motor Speedway, is a motorsports complex located north of Talladega, Alabama. It is located on the former Anniston Air Force Base in the small city of Lincoln. A tri-oval, the track was constructed in 1969 by the International Speedway Corporation, a business controlled by the France family. Talladega is most known for its steep banking. The track currently hosts NASCAR's Cup Series, Xfinity Series and Gander RV & Outdoors Truck Series. Talladega is the longest NASCAR oval with a length of 2.66-mile-long (4.28 km) tri-oval like the Daytona International Speedway, which is 2.5-mile-long (4.0 km).

The GEICO 500 was the first NASCAR event since The Real Heroes 400 in May to admit a limited number of public spectators. Races had been held behind closed doors due to the COVID-19 pandemic, but the previous week's Dixie Vodka 400 was the first to admit spectators in grandstands — limited to an invited audience of local members of the U.S. military. Attendance was capped at 5,000 in grandstands and towers, with social distancing and mandatory masking enforced. A limited number of campsites above the Alabama Gang Superstretch were also opened. Tickets were being re-issued on a first come first served basis to local residents who had originally purchased tickets to the race before these changes. Only the Cup race allowed spectators; support races did not open grandstands, but Alabama Gang Superstretch campsites were open for those races.

==== Impact of the FIA's End Racism campaign and noose incident ====
This was the first race open to spectators after NASCAR's decision to ban the Confederate battle flag following a pair of incidents—a complaint by Bubba Wallace and the FIA's "End Racism" campaign by Sir Lewis Hamilton, since NASCAR is a founding member of the Automobile Competition Committee for the United States, the national governing body of motorsport designated by the FIA. On the day of the race, vendors outside of the track sold memorabilia carrying the flag, and a plane towing a banner with the flag and "Defund NASCAR" circled the track; NASCAR officials and Governor of Alabama Kay Ivey condemned the flyover, for which Sons of Confederate Veterans later claimed responsibility.

NASCAR reported that a noose had been found inside Wallace's stall, and stated that it would investigate it as a hate crime with the FBI. NASCAR president Steve Phelps threatened that anyone found responsible "will be banned from this sport for life. I don't care who they are, they will not be here." The United States Department of Justice Civil Rights Division also joined the investigation. As a sign of solidarity, other drivers and crew members pushed Wallace's car down pit road prior to the start of the race (which had been rescheduled to June 22 due to rain), while "#IStandWithBubba" was painted on the infield grass.

On June 23, the FBI concluded that no hate crime targeting Wallace had occurred at the track, stating that the "noose" was a pulldown rope for a door, and had been present at the track since 2019. On June 25, NASCAR released a photo of the rope, and announced that it had investigated the stalls of all other NASCAR facilities — concluding that the pulldown rope in that stall was the only one that had been tied in such a manner.

==== Entry list ====
- (R) denotes rookie driver.
- (i) denotes driver who are ineligible for series driver points.

No.	Driver	Team	Manufacturer
00	Quin Houff (R)	StarCom Racing	Chevrolet
1	Kurt Busch	Chip Ganassi Racing	Chevrolet
2	Brad Keselowski	Team Penske	Ford
3	Austin Dillon	Richard Childress Racing	Chevrolet
4	Kevin Harvick	Stewart-Haas Racing	Ford
6	Ryan Newman	Roush Fenway Racing	Ford
8	Tyler Reddick (R)	Richard Childress Racing	Chevrolet
9	Chase Elliott	Hendrick Motorsports	Chevrolet
10	Aric Almirola	Stewart-Haas Racing	Ford
11	Denny Hamlin	Joe Gibbs Racing	Toyota
12	Ryan Blaney	Team Penske	Ford
13	Ty Dillon	Germain Racing	Chevrolet
14	Clint Bowyer	Stewart-Haas Racing	Ford
15	Brennan Poole (R)	Premium Motorsports	Chevrolet
17	Chris Buescher	Roush Fenway Racing	Ford
18	Kyle Busch	Joe Gibbs Racing	Toyota
19	Martin Truex Jr.	Joe Gibbs Racing	Toyota
20	Erik Jones	Joe Gibbs Racing	Toyota
21	Matt DiBenedetto	Wood Brothers Racing	Ford
22	Joey Logano	Team Penske	Ford
24	William Byron	Hendrick Motorsports	Chevrolet
27	Gray Gaulding (i)	Rick Ware Racing	Ford
32	Corey LaJoie	Go Fas Racing	Ford
34	Michael McDowell	Front Row Motorsports	Ford
37	Ryan Preece	JTG Daugherty Racing	Chevrolet
38	John Hunter Nemechek (R)	Front Row Motorsports	Ford
41	Cole Custer (R)	Stewart-Haas Racing	Ford
42	Matt Kenseth	Chip Ganassi Racing	Chevrolet
43	Bubba Wallace	Richard Petty Motorsports	Chevrolet
47	Ricky Stenhouse Jr.	JTG Daugherty Racing	Chevrolet
48	Jimmie Johnson	Hendrick Motorsports	Chevrolet
51	Joey Gase (i)	Petty Ware Racing	Ford
53	J. J. Yeley (i)	Rick Ware Racing	Chevrolet
62	Brendan Gaughan	Beard Motorsports	Chevrolet
66	Timmy Hill (i)	MBM Motorsports	Toyota
77	B. J. McLeod (i)	Spire Motorsports	Chevrolet
78	Garrett Smithley (i)	B. J. McLeod Motorsports	Chevrolet
88	Alex Bowman	Hendrick Motorsports	Chevrolet
95	Christopher Bell (R)	Leavine Family Racing	Toyota
96	Daniel Suárez	Gaunt Brothers Racing	Toyota
Official entry list

NOTE: Garrett Smithley was added as a late addition after owner B. J. McLeod was inserted into the Spire Motorsports car following NASCAR rejecting the team's original plan of having James Davison in the car because he lacked NASCAR superspeedway experience in a situation where practice and qualifying were omitted. Although the Australian has high-speed oval experience in other ACCUS-sanctioned events, NASCAR rejected Davison because he lacked drafting experience in similar cars in regards to the adverse conditions rules in effect after the pandemic.

== Qualifying ==
Martin Truex Jr. was awarded the pole for the race as determined by a random draw.

=== Starting Lineup ===
Pos	No.	Driver	Team	Manufacturer
1	19	Martin Truex Jr.	Joe Gibbs Racing	Toyota
2	11	Denny Hamlin	Joe Gibbs Racing	Toyota
3	18	Kyle Busch	Joe Gibbs Racing	Toyota
4	48	Jimmie Johnson	Hendrick Motorsports	Chevrolet
5	4	Kevin Harvick	Stewart-Haas Racing	Ford
6	2	Brad Keselowski	Team Penske	Ford
7	1	Kurt Busch	Chip Ganassi Racing	Chevrolet
8	88	Alex Bowman	Hendrick Motorsports	Chevrolet
9	22	Joey Logano	Team Penske	Ford
10	14	Clint Bowyer	Stewart-Haas Racing	Ford
11	9	Chase Elliott	Hendrick Motorsports	Chevrolet
12	12	Ryan Blaney	Team Penske	Ford
13	42	Matt Kenseth	Chip Ganassi Racing	Chevrolet
14	6	Ryan Newman	Roush Fenway Racing	Ford
15	10	Aric Almirola	Stewart-Haas Racing	Ford
16	8	Tyler Reddick (R)	Richard Childress Racing	Chevrolet
17	3	Austin Dillon	Richard Childress Racing	Chevrolet
18	20	Erik Jones	Joe Gibbs Racing	Toyota
19	24	William Byron	Hendrick Motorsports	Chevrolet
20	47	Ricky Stenhouse Jr.	JTG Daugherty Racing	Chevrolet
21	17	Chris Buescher	Roush Fenway Racing	Ford
22	38	John Hunter Nemechek (R)	Front Row Motorsports	Ford
23	21	Matt DiBenedetto	Wood Brothers Racing	Ford
24	43	Bubba Wallace	Richard Petty Motorsports	Chevrolet
25	32	Corey LaJoie	Go Fas Racing	Ford
26	34	Michael McDowell	Front Row Motorsports	Ford
27	15	Brennan Poole (R)	Premium Motorsports	Chevrolet
28	41	Cole Custer (R)	Stewart-Haas Racing	Ford
29	27	Gray Gaulding (i)	Rick Ware Racing	Ford
30	77	B. J. McLeod (i)	Spire Motorsports	Chevrolet
31	37	Ryan Preece	JTG Daugherty Racing	Chevrolet
32	00	Quin Houff (R)	StarCom Racing	Chevrolet
33	13	Ty Dillon	Germain Racing	Chevrolet
34	53	J. J. Yeley (i)	Rick Ware Racing	Chevrolet
35	95	Christopher Bell (R)	Leavine Family Racing	Toyota
36	51	Joey Gase (i)	Petty Ware Racing	Ford
37	96	Daniel Suárez	Gaunt Brothers Racing	Toyota
38	66	Timmy Hill (i)	MBM Motorsports	Toyota
39	62	Brendan Gaughan	Beard Motorsports	Chevrolet
40	78	Garrett Smithley (i)	B. J. McLeod Motorsports	Chevrolet
Official starting lineup

== Race ==
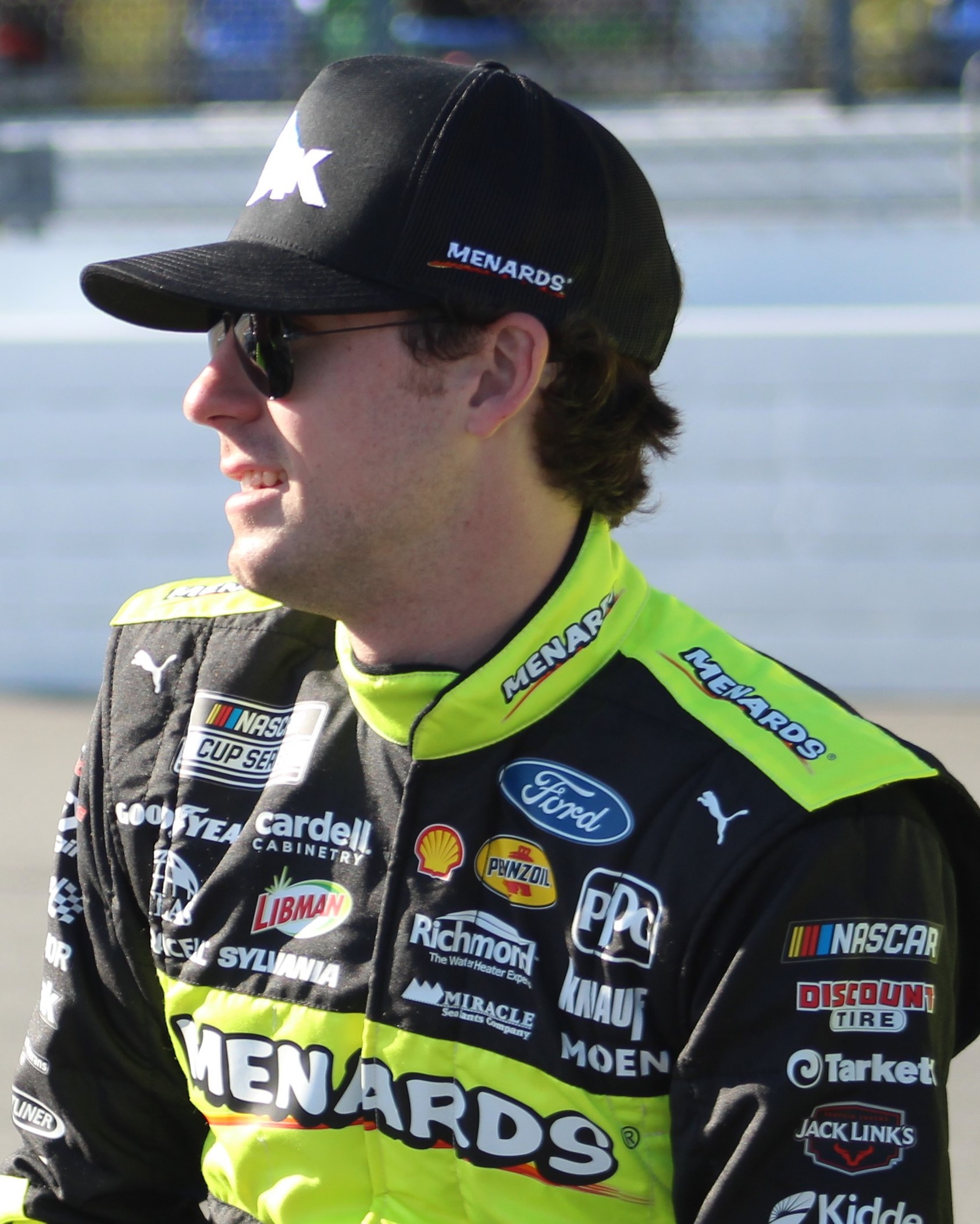
Ryan Blaney won the race.

=== Stage Results ===
Stage One Laps: 60

Pos	No	Driver	Team	Manufacturer	Points
1	8	Tyler Reddick (R)	Richard Childress Racing	Chevrolet	10
2	88	Alex Bowman	Hendrick Motorsports	Chevrolet	9
3	22	Joey Logano	Team Penske	Ford	8
4	48	Jimmie Johnson	Hendrick Motorsports	Chevrolet	7
5	18	Kyle Busch	Joe Gibbs Racing	Toyota	6
6	12	Ryan Blaney	Team Penske	Ford	5
7	2	Brad Keselowski	Team Penske	Ford	4
8	1	Kurt Busch	Chip Ganassi Racing	Chevrolet	3
9	9	Chase Elliott	Hendrick Motorsports	Chevrolet	2
10	24	William Byron	Hendrick Motorsports	Chevrolet	1
Official stage one results

Stage Two Laps: 60

Pos	No	Driver	Team	Manufacturer	Points
1	47	Ricky Stenhouse Jr.	JTG Daugherty Racing	Chevrolet	10
2	12	Ryan Blaney	Team Penske	Ford	9
3	18	Kyle Busch	Joe Gibbs Racing	Toyota	8
4	2	Brad Keselowski	Team Penske	Ford	7
5	95	Christopher Bell (R)	Leavine Family Racing	Toyota	6
6	22	Joey Logano	Team Penske	Ford	5
7	43	Bubba Wallace	Richard Petty Motorsports	Chevrolet	4
8	41	Cole Custer (R)	Stewart-Haas Racing	Ford	3
9	17	Chris Buescher	Roush Fenway Racing	Ford	2
10	24	William Byron	Hendrick Motorsports	Chevrolet	1
Official stage two results

=== Final Stage Results ===
Stage Three Laps: 68

Pos	Grid	No	Driver	Team	Manufacturer	Laps	Points
1	12	12	Ryan Blaney	Team Penske	Ford	191	54
2	20	47	Ricky Stenhouse Jr.	JTG Daugherty Racing	Chevrolet	191	45
3	15	10	Aric Almirola	Stewart-Haas Racing	Ford	191	34
4	2	11	Denny Hamlin	Joe Gibbs Racing	Toyota	191	33
5	18	20	Erik Jones	Joe Gibbs Racing	Toyota	191	32
6	21	17	Chris Buescher	Roush Fenway Racing	Ford	191	33
7	8	88	Alex Bowman	Hendrick Motorsports	Chevrolet	191	39
8	22	38	John Hunter Nemechek (R)	Front Row Motorsports	Ford	191	29
9	7	1	Kurt Busch	Chip Ganassi Racing	Chevrolet	191	31
10	5	4	Kevin Harvick	Stewart-Haas Racing	Ford	191	27
11	19	24	William Byron	Hendrick Motorsports	Chevrolet	191	28
12	33	13	Ty Dillon	Germain Racing	Chevrolet	191	25
13	4	48	Jimmie Johnson	Hendrick Motorsports	Chevrolet	191	31
14	24	43	Bubba Wallace	Richard Petty Motorsports	Chevrolet	191	27
15	31	37	Ryan Preece	JTG Daugherty Racing	Chevrolet	191	22
16	25	32	Corey LaJoie	Go Fas Racing	Ford	191	21
17	9	22	Joey Logano	Team Penske	Ford	191	33
18	26	34	Michael McDowell	Front Row Motorsports	Ford	191	19
19	6	2	Brad Keselowski	Team Penske	Ford	191	29
20	16	8	Tyler Reddick (R)	Richard Childress Racing	Chevrolet	191	27
21	39	62	Brendan Gaughan	Beard Motorsports	Chevrolet	191	16
22	28	41	Cole Custer (R)	Stewart-Haas Racing	Ford	191	18
23	14	6	Ryan Newman	Roush Fenway Racing	Ford	191	14
24	1	19	Martin Truex Jr.	Joe Gibbs Racing	Toyota	191	13
25	10	14	Clint Bowyer	Stewart-Haas Racing	Ford	191	12
26	23	21	Matt DiBenedetto	Wood Brothers Racing	Ford	191	11
27	32	00	Quin Houff (R)	StarCom Racing	Chevrolet	190	10
28	27	96	Daniel Suárez	Gaunt Brothers Racing	Toyota	190	9
29	35	95	Christopher Bell (R)	Leavine Family Racing	Toyota	190	14
30	29	27	Gray Gaulding (i)	Rick Ware Racing	Ford	190	0
31	30	77	B. J. McLeod (i)	Spire Motorsports	Chevrolet	190	0
32	3	18	Kyle Busch	Joe Gibbs Racing	Toyota	189	19
33	38	66	Timmy Hill (i)	MBM Motorsports	Toyota	185	0
34	40	78	Garrett Smithley (i)	B. J. McLeod Motorsports	Chevrolet	185	0
35	27	15	Brennan Poole (R)	Premium Motorsports	Chevrolet	178	2
36	34	53	J. J. Yeley (i)	Rick Ware Racing	Chevrolet	178	0
37	36	51	Joey Gase (i)	Petty Ware Racing	Ford	141	0
38	11	9	Chase Elliott	Hendrick Motorsports	Chevrolet	135	3
39	17	3	Austin Dillon	Richard Childress Racing	Chevrolet	133	1
40	13	42	Matt Kenseth	Chip Ganassi Racing	Chevrolet	127	1
Official race results

=== Race statistics ===
- Lead changes: 56 among 19 different drivers
- Cautions/Laps: 9 for 31
- Red flags: 1 for 57 minutes and 18 seconds
- Time of race: 3 hours, 27 minutes and 28 seconds
- Average speed: 146.933 miles per hour (236.466 km/h)

== Media ==
=== Television ===
Fox Sports covered their 20th race at the Talladega Superspeedway. Mike Joy and six-time Talladega winner – and all-time restrictor plate race wins record holder – Jeff Gordon covered the race from the Fox Sports studio in Charlotte. Jamie Little and Vince Welch handled the pit road duties. Larry McReynolds provided insight from the Fox Sports studio in Charlotte.

Fox
Booth announcers	Pit reporters	In-race analyst
Lap-by-lap: Mike Joy; Color-commentator: Jeff Gordon	Jamie Little; Vince Welch	Larry McReynolds

=== Radio ===
MRN had the radio call for the race which was also simulcast on Sirius XM NASCAR Radio. Alex Hayden and Jeff Striegle called the race in the booth when the field raced through the tri-oval. Dave Moody called the race from the Sunoco spotters stand outside turn 2 when the field raced through turns 1 and 2. Mike Bagley called the races from a platform inside the backstretch when the field raced down the backstretch. Kurt Becker called the race from the Sunoco spotters stand outside turn 4 when the field races through turns 3 and 4. Winston Kelley and Steve Post worked pit road for the radio side.

MRN Radio
Booth announcers	Turn announcers	Pit reporters
Lead announcer: Alex Hayden; Announcer: Jeff Striegle	Turns 1 & 2: Dave Moody; Backstretch: Mike Bagley; Turns 3 & 4: Kurt Becker	Winston Kelley; Steve Post

== Standings after the race ==
Drivers' Championship standings

	Pos	Driver	Points
	1	Kevin Harvick	490
1	2	Joey Logano	468 (–22)
2	3	Ryan Blaney	465 (–25)
2	4	Chase Elliott	458 (–32)
1	5	Brad Keselowski	441 (–49)
1	6	Denny Hamlin	428 (–62)
1	7	Martin Truex Jr.	423 (–67)
	8	Alex Bowman	419 (–71)
	9	Kyle Busch	378 (–112)
	10	Kurt Busch	369 (–121)
	11	Jimmie Johnson	353 (–137)
1	12	Aric Almirola	337 (–153)
1	13	Clint Bowyer	328 (–162)
1	14	William Byron	319 (–171)
1	15	Matt DiBenedetto	312 (–178)
1	16	Tyler Reddick	306 (–184)
Official driver's standings

Manufacturers' Championship standings

Pos	Manufacturer	Points
1	Ford	484
2	Toyota	452 (–32)
3	Chevrolet	443 (–41)

- Note: Only the first 16 positions are included for the driver standings.
- . – Driver has clinched a position in the NASCAR Cup Series playoffs.

Previous race: 2020 Dixie Vodka 400	NASCAR Cup Series; 2020 season	Next race: 2020 Pocono Organics 325
