= Kenneth D. Bell =

American judge (born 1958)

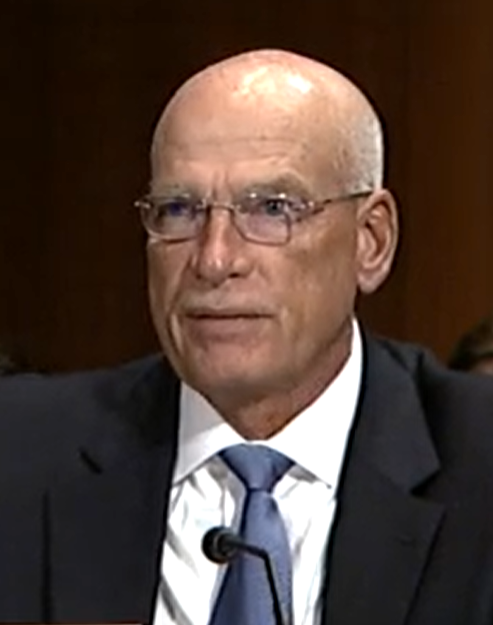

Judge of the United States District Court for the Western District of North Carolina
- Incumbent
- Assumed office June 12, 2019
- Appointed by: Donald Trump
- Preceded by: Richard Lesley Voorhees

Personal details
- Born: Kenneth Duard Bell; 1958 (age 67–68) Bedford, Ohio, U.S.
- Party: Republican
- Education: Wake Forest University (BA, JD)

Kenneth Davis Bell Sr. (born 1958) is a United States district judge of the United States District Court for the Western District of North Carolina.

== Early life ==
Bell earned his Bachelor of Arts from Wake Forest University and his Juris Doctor from the Wake Forest University School of Law. In 1990, he unsuccessfully ran for North Carolina's 5th congressional district as a Republican.

== Legal career ==
In the Western District of North Carolina, Bell served as an Assistant United States Attorney for eight years and then as First Assistant U.S. Attorney for ten years. In 2003, he received the Department of Justice's John Marshall Award for prosecuting the first conviction of material support to a terrorist organization, which was by a Hezbollah cell. He later was a partner at Hunton & Williams and Mayer Brown. From 2003 to 2019 he was a partner at McGuireWoods.

== Federal judicial service ==
On April 10, 2018, President Donald Trump announced his intent to nominate Bell to serve as a United States District Judge of the United States District Court for the Western District of North Carolina. On April 12, 2018, his nomination was sent to the Senate. He was nominated to the seat vacated by Judge Richard Lesley Voorhees, who assumed senior status on August 31, 2017. On August 22, 2018, a hearing on his nomination was held before the Senate Judiciary Committee. On October 11, 2018, his nomination was reported out of committee by an 11–10 vote.

On January 3, 2019, his nomination was returned to the President under Rule XXXI, Paragraph 6 of the United States Senate. On January 23, 2019, President Trump announced his intent to renominate Bell for a federal judgeship. His nomination was sent to the Senate later that day. On February 7, 2019, his nomination was reported out of committee by a 12–10 vote. On May 21, 2019, the Senate invoked cloture on his nomination by a 56–42 vote. On May 22, 2019, his nomination was confirmed by a 55–43 vote. He received his judicial commission on June 12, 2019.

One of the most notable cases he has presided over as a district judge has been the 23XI Racing v. NASCAR.

Legal offices
Preceded by Richard Lesley Voorhees	Judge of the United States District Court for the Western District of North Carolina; 2019–present	Incumbent
