= Max O. Cogburn Jr. =

American judge (born 1951)

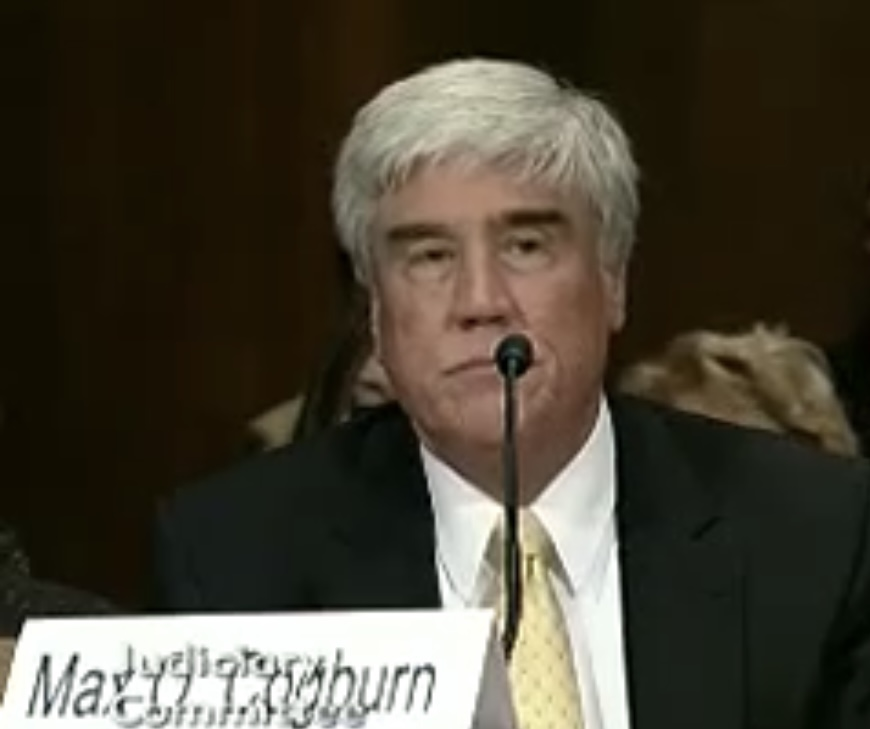

Judge of the United States District Court for the Western District of North Carolina
- Incumbent
- Assumed office March 11, 2011
- Appointed by: Barack Obama
- Preceded by: Lacy Thornburg

Magistrate Judge of the United States District Court for the Western District of North Carolina
- In office 1995–2004

Personal details
- Born: Max Oliver Cogburn Jr. April 21, 1951 (age 75) Cambridge, Massachusetts, U.S.
- Education: University of North Carolina at Chapel Hill (BA); Samford University (JD)

Max Oliver Cogburn Jr. (born April 21, 1951) is a United States district judge of the United States District Court for the Western District of North Carolina.

== Early life and education ==
Cogburn was born in Cambridge, Massachusetts, while his father, Max Cogburn Sr., pursued a Master of Laws degree from Harvard Law School. After four years in Chapel Hill, where Cogburn Sr. taught the University of North Carolina Institute of Government, the family returned to Buncombe County in 1955, where Cogburn Sr. would continue practice law for nearly 50 years. The Cogburn family owns Pisgah View Ranch near Candler, which will become Pisgah View State Park.

Cogburn earned a Bachelor of Arts degree from the University of North Carolina in 1973 and a Juris Doctor from the Samford University Cumberland School of Law in 1976.

== Career ==
From 1976 until 1980, Cogburn worked as an associate and then as a partner at an Asheville, North Carolina law firm. From 1980 until 1992, he worked in the United States Attorney's office in Asheville as an Assistant United States Attorney, including as Chief Assistant United States Attorney from 1986 until 1988. From 1992 until 1995, Cogburn was a partner in a law firm in Charlotte, North Carolina. From 1995 until 2004, he served as a federal magistrate judge on the United States District Court for the Western District of North Carolina. He returned to private practice in 2004, working in Asheville, North Carolina.

=== Federal judicial service ===
On May 27, 2010, President Barack Obama nominated Cogburn to a seat on the Western District of North Carolina. He was reported out of the Senate Judiciary Committee on December 8, 2010, but his nomination lapsed at the end of 2010 and the end of the 111th Congress. Obama renominated Cogburn on January 5, 2011, and he was reported out of the Senate Judiciary Committee on February 3, 2011. The Senate confirmed Cogburn by a 96–0 vote on March 10, 2011. He received his commission on March 11, 2011.

In February 2022, Cogburn announced his decision to move to senior status to take a reduced court caseload. In November 2024, Cogburn reversed his decision to take senior status and remain a full-time federal district court judge.

=== Notable rulings ===
- On October 10, 2014, Cogburn struck down North Carolina's gay marriage ban as unconstitutional, opening the way for same-sex marriages in North Carolina to begin immediately.
- Cogburn was a member of a three-judge panel that struck down the redistricting of certain North Carolina Congressional districts for relying too heavily on race. Cogburn also wrote a separate concurring opinion in that case. The case eventually made its way to the Supreme Court. The case, Cooper v. Harris, was upheld by a 5–3 decision of the Supreme Court on May 22, 2017.

Legal offices
Preceded by Lacy Thornburg	Judge of the United States District Court for the Western District of North Carolina; 2011–present	Incumbent
