= Tyler Reddick =

American racing driver (born 1996)

- Reddick at Las Vegas Motor Speedway in 2026
- Born: Tyler George Reddick; January 11, 1996 (age 30); Corning, California, U.S.
- Achievements: First Driver to win First 3 races of a NASCAR Cup Series season 2026 Daytona 500 Winner; 2024 NASCAR Cup Series Regular Season Champion; 2018, 2019 NASCAR Xfinity Series Champion; 2019 NASCAR Xfinity Series Regular Season Champion; 2024 Bluegreen Vacations Duel Winner
- Awards: 2018 NASCAR Xfinity Series Rookie of the Year; 2016 NASCAR Camping World Truck Series Most Popular Driver; 2011 Lucas Oil Late Model Dirt Series Rookie of the year

NASCAR Cup Series career
- 254 races run over 8 years
- Car no., team: No. 45 (23XI Racing)
- 2026 position: 5th
- Best finish: 4th (2024)
- First race: 2019 Daytona 500 (Daytona)
- Last race: 2026 Season Finale 400 (Homestead)
- First win: 2022 Kwik Trip 250 (Road America)
- Last win: 2026 Freeway Insurance 500 (Phoenix)
Wins	Top tens	Poles
14	113	16

NASCAR O'Reilly Auto Parts Series career
- 99 races run over 7 years
- 2024 position: 96th
- Best finish: 1st (2018, 2019)
- First race: 2017 PowerShares QQQ 300 (Daytona)
- Last race: 2024 Tennessee Lottery 250 (Nashville)
- First win: 2017 VisitMyrtleBeach.com 300 (Kentucky)
- Last win: 2022 SRS Distribution 250 (Texas)
Wins	Top tens	Poles
10	58	7

NASCAR FedEx Freight Truck Series career
- 63 races run over 4 years
- 2016 position: 9th
- Best finish: 2nd (2015)
- First race: 2013 North Carolina Education Lottery 200 (Rockingham)
- Last race: 2016 Ford EcoBoost 200 (Homestead)
- First win: 2015 NextEra Energy Resources 250 (Daytona)
- Last win: 2016 DC Solar 350 (Las Vegas)
Wins	Top tens	Poles
3	40	3

ARCA Menards Series career
- 4 races run over 3 years
- Best finish: 63rd (2012)
- First race: 2012 Mobile ARCA 200 (Mobile)
- Last race: 2014 Lucas Oil 200 (Daytona)
Wins	Top tens	Poles
0	2	0

ARCA Menards Series East career
- 2 races run over 2 years
- Best finish: 47th (2012)
- First race: 2012 Classic 3 Championship (Rockingham)
- Last race: 2013 DRIVE4COPD 125 (Bristol)
- First win: 2012 Classic 3 Championship (Rockingham)
Wins	Top tens	Poles
1	1	0
- Statistics up to date as of November 8, 2026.

Tyler George Reddick (born January 11, 1996) is an American professional stock car racing driver. He competes full-time in the NASCAR Cup Series, driving the No. 45 Toyota Camry XSE for 23XI Racing.

Reddick is a two-time champion in the NASCAR Xfinity Series, winning consecutive titles in 2018 and 2019. In 2018, Reddick set a NASCAR record at Daytona for the closest finish in NASCAR history by 0.0004 seconds. In 2026, he had a breakout year, becoming the first driver in the history of the Cup Series to win the first three races of a season, including that year's Daytona 500.

== Racing career ==
=== Early career ===
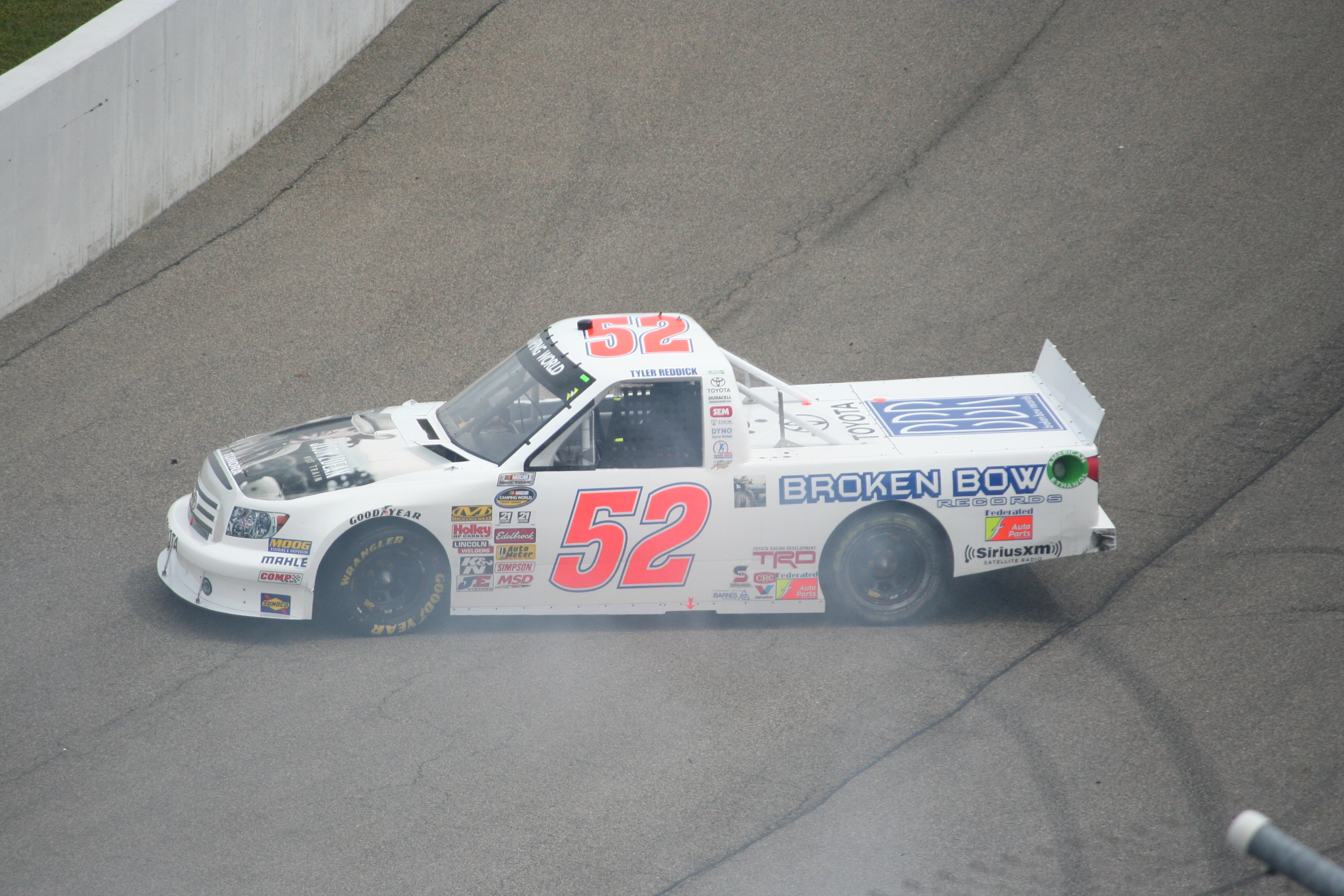
Reddick's 2013 truck

Reddick began his racing career at the age of four, competing in Outlaw Karts; soon after, he was competing in mini sprints, midgets, dirt late models, and sprint cars. He was the youngest driver to qualify for the pole position at Eldora Speedway World 100, the youngest driver to win at the East Bay Winter Nationals, and the youngest winning driver in the Lucas Oil Late Model Dirt Series. He is also the youngest driver ever to qualify for a feature race in World of Outlaws sprint car racing.

Reddick made his debut in the ARCA Racing Series in 2012. That October, he won in his first career start in the NASCAR K&N Pro Series East at Rockingham Speedway.

=== Camping World Truck Series ===
Reddick made his debut in the NASCAR Camping World Truck Series in April 2013, driving for Ken Schrader Racing at Rockingham Speedway; he was involved in an accident during the race, and finished 30th.

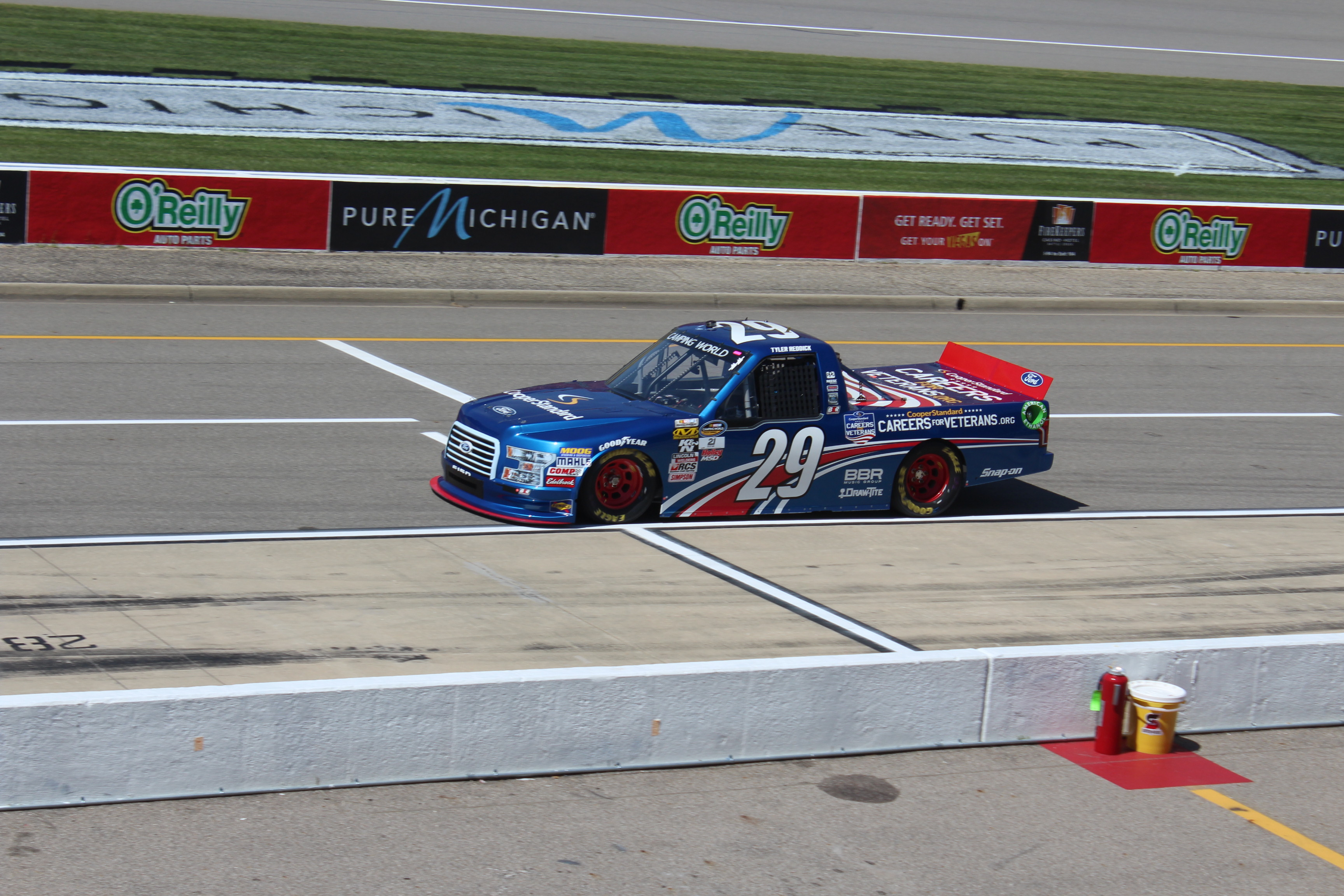
Reddick's No. 29 F-150, sporting a special paint scheme for the 2016 Careers for Veterans 200 at Michigan International Speedway

In November 2013, it was announced that Reddick had been signed by Brad Keselowski Racing to compete in the Camping World Truck Series; he was scheduled to drive the team's No. 19 Ford in 16 events in the series in 2014, before running the full series schedule for the team in 2015. On February 20, 2015, Reddick got his first career victory in the Camping World Truck Series at Daytona. On May 29, he got his second career victory in the Truck Series at Dover. He led the points during the later stages of the summer until wrecking at Mosport, at which point he surrendered the lead to eventual champion Erik Jones. He ultimately finished 2nd in his first full year of competition.

In 2016, Reddick returned to BKR, switching the No. 19 to the No. 29, with his new BKR teammate Hemric using his previous No. 19. He started the season with a crash at Daytona, finishing 18th. He would have been in contention for the championship in 2016, but he failed to make it into the playoffs. He won at Las Vegas for his first victory of the season. On November 10, 2016, it was announced that Reddick would not return to BKR next season.

=== Xfinity Series ===
Eight days after the BKR announcement, Reddick joined Chip Ganassi Racing to drive the No. 42 Chevrolet Camaro in the Xfinity Series on a part-time basis starting in 2017. That September, he won his first Xfinity race at Kentucky Speedway after leading 66 laps and winning with a 14-second advantage over teammate Brennan Poole. A month later, Reddick won his first Xfinity pole at Kansas Speedway.

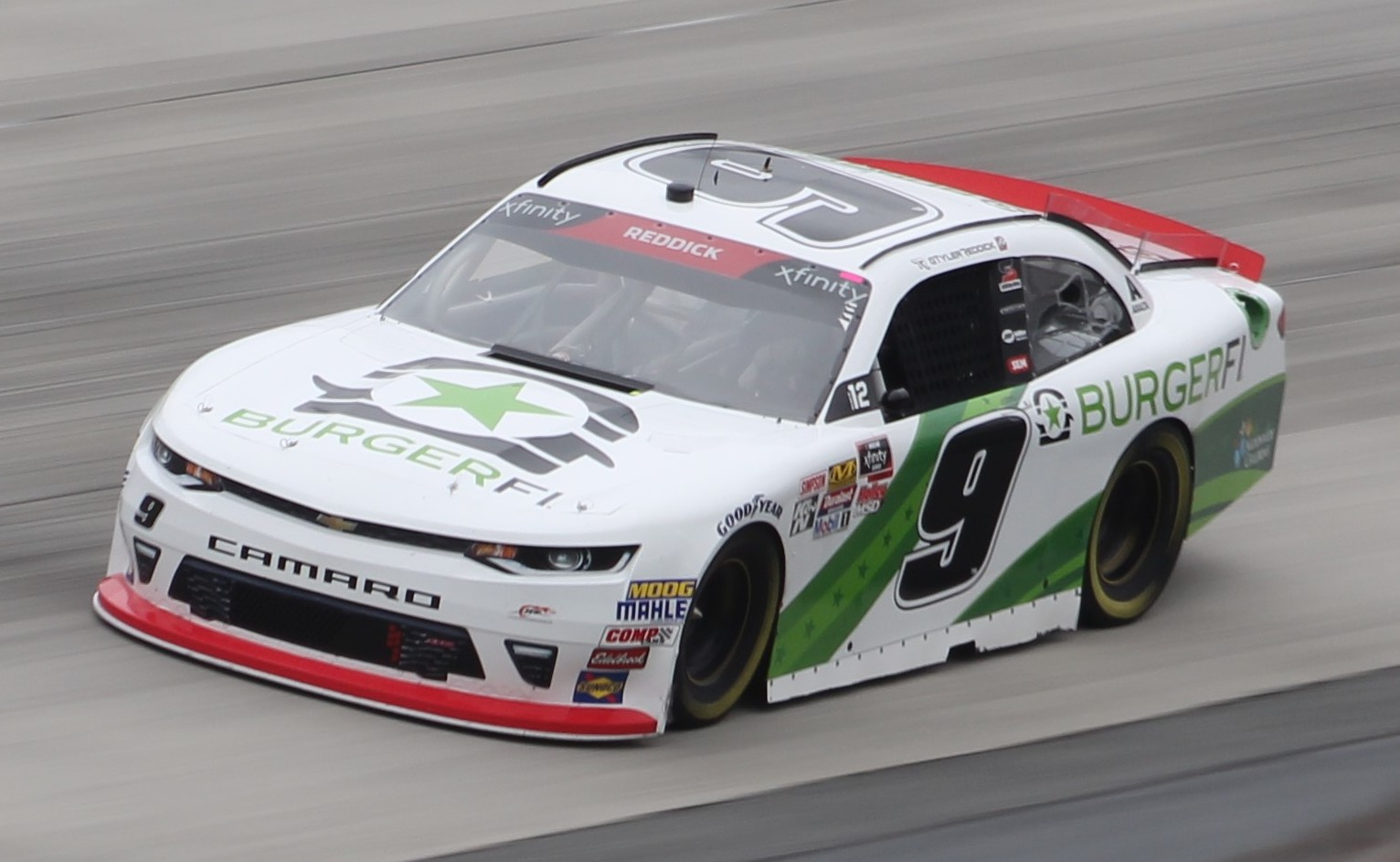
Reddick's No. 9 Xfinity championship car

On September 14, 2017, Reddick was signed by JR Motorsports to a full-time schedule for the 2018 Xfinity season, replacing William Byron, who was promoted to the Monster Energy NASCAR Cup Series, in the No. 24 car. On February 17, 2018, Reddick beat teammate Elliott Sadler in a photo finish to win the season-opening race at Daytona. At a margin of .0004 seconds, it is the closest finish in NASCAR history. Although he did not win again for the remainder of the regular season, he qualified for the playoffs and reached the Championship Round. In the season finale at Homestead, Reddick won the race and his first Xfinity Series championship.

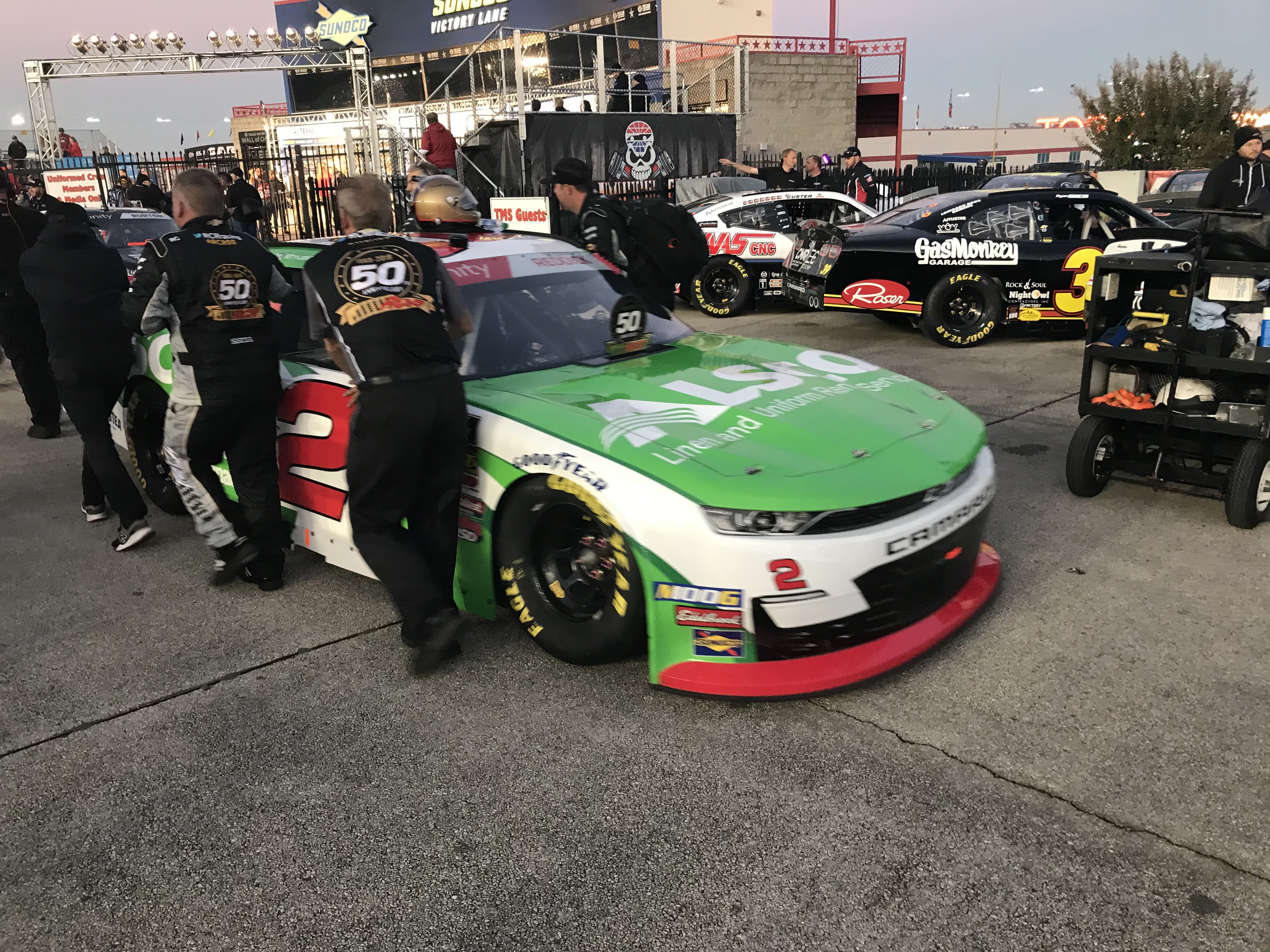
Reddick's 2019 Xfinity car was pushed to the grid at the 2019 O'Reilly Auto Parts 300 at Texas Motor Speedway. He finished 29th after starting on the pole.

On October 31, 2018, it was announced that Reddick would switch from JR Motorsports to Richard Childress Racing in 2019. He explained that his move to RCR was for a better chance to run in the Monster Energy NASCAR Cup Series in the near future. In April 2019, Reddick won his first race with RCR in the MoneyLion 300 at Talladega. At the end of the Kansas race, he got into a fight with Cole Custer on pit road. At the 2019 O'Reilly Auto Parts 300 at Texas Motor Speedway, Reddick scored his fourth pole of the season and led 32 laps before crashing and finishing 29th in the final order. He won at Homestead to claim his second consecutive Xfinity Series championship.

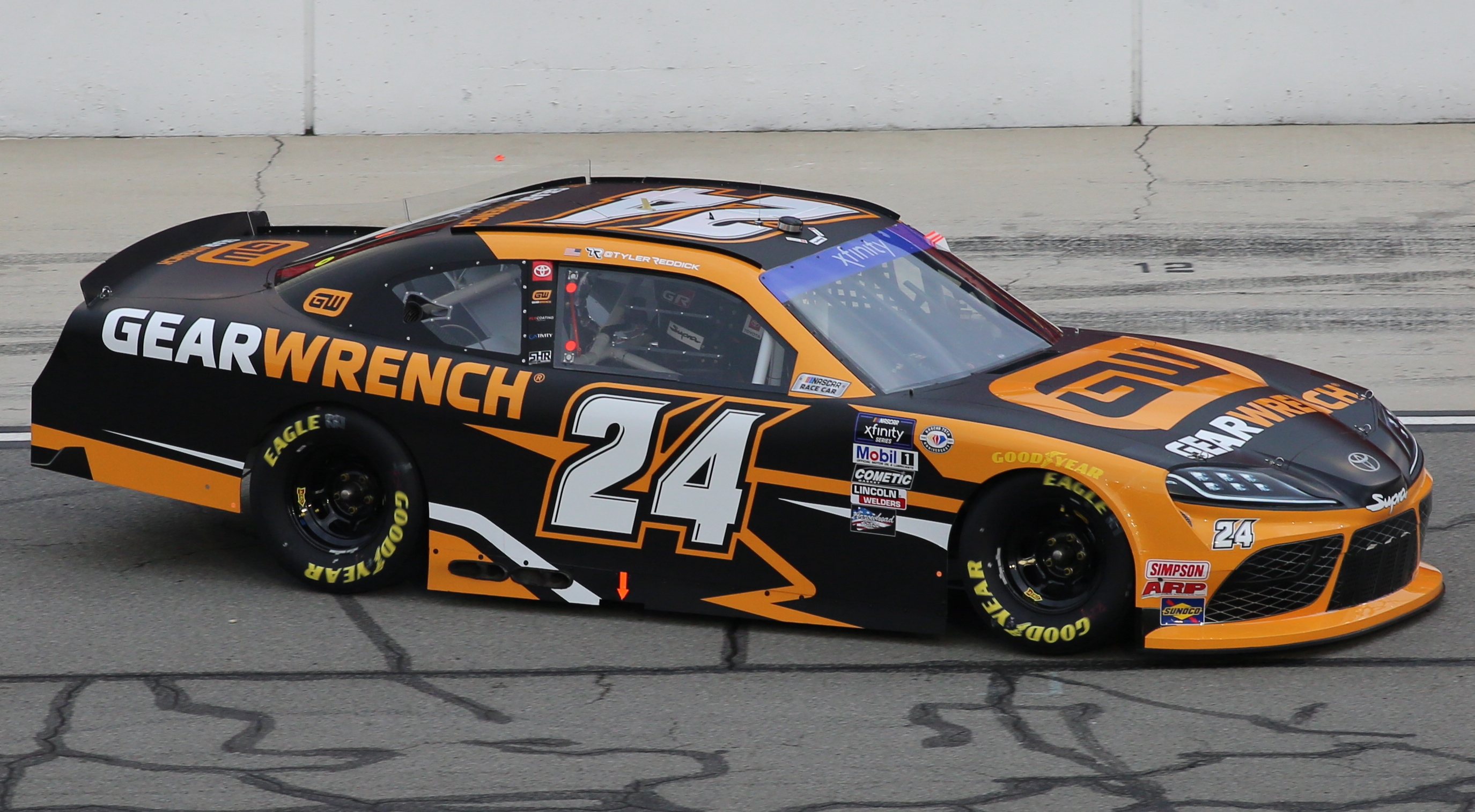
Reddick at Auto Club Speedway in 2023

Reddick returned to the Xfinity Series for the 2021 season opener at Daytona, driving a newly opened No. 03 car for Our Motorsports. However, the car missed the race as qualifying was rained out. Two weeks later at Homestead, he moved to RSS Racing's No. 23 in a partnership with Our; he finished second behind RCR's Myatt Snider, but was disqualified when his car failed the rear height requirements during post-race inspection. In May, he signed with Jordan Anderson Racing to race at Circuit of the Americas.

In 2022, Reddick drove the Big Machine Racing No. 48 to the team's first win at Texas.

In 2023, he drove the No. 24 Toyota for Sam Hunt Racing for select races.

In 2024, he returned to Sam Hunt Racing behind the wheel of the No. 26 Toyota at Nashville.

=== Cup Series ===
==== 2019 ====
On February 1, 2019, it was announced that Reddick would make his Cup Series debut at the 2019 Daytona 500, driving the No. 31 car for RCR. After qualifying for the race as an open (non-charter) car, he started 39th. He was involved in two incidents during the race: on lap 159, as he was about to pit, contact by Cody Ware sent him airborne before being hit by Jimmie Johnson, ripping Johnson's left side; on lap 191, he was involved in "The Big One" that collected 20 other drivers.

In April, Reddick participated in qualifying at Talladega, driving the No. 62 Beard Motorsports car in place of Brendan Gaughan, who was attending his son's communion. Reddick was 29th fastest, but Gaughan started at the rear for the race under NASCAR's driver change rules. In only his second MENCS start at Kansas, Reddick finished ninth.

On October 2, 2019, RCR officially announced Reddick as the driver of the No. 8 Chevrolet for the 2020 season.

==== 2020 ====
Reddick scored his first top-ten of the 2020 season at the first Darlington spring race, finishing seventh. At Homestead, he ran in the top-five almost all day and finished fourth, his then-best career finish, despite almost losing the position on the last lap after thinking that the race ended a lap early.

Reddick nearly won the 2020 GEICO 500 at Talladega, controlling the lead in the late stages but ultimately losing it with four laps to go and finishing 20th. He also contended with RCR teammate Austin Dillon for the victory at Texas after opting not to pit during a caution caused by fellow rookie Quin Houff spinning out, which moved him to the lead with 23 laps to go as a result. Reddick finished a then career-best second-place to Dillon, marking an RCR 1–2 finish for the first time since the 2011 Good Sam Club 500. Reddick posted three top-five finishes and nine top-ten finishes. He was in playoff contention for most of the year, being 19th in points heading into the regular-season finale in the Coke Zero Sugar 400, the regular-season finale. He nearly won the race, but in the late stages, he attempted to clear the No. 18 of Kyle Busch, but had not fully passed him and instead collided with Busch. The contact lost Reddick the lead, and he was caught up in another wreck, resulting in him missing the playoffs. He finished the season 19th in points.

==== 2021: First playoff appearance ====
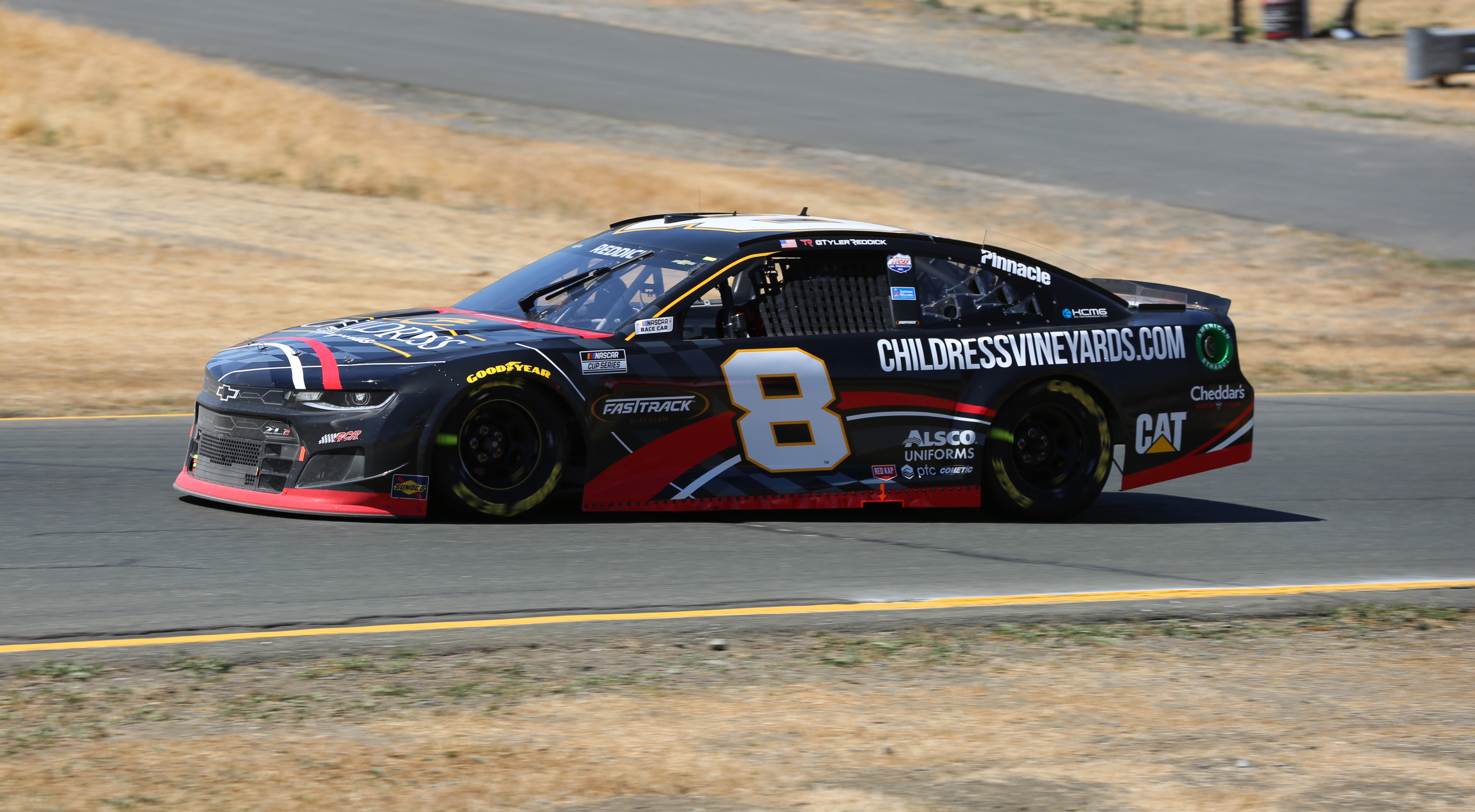
Reddick in the No. 8 at Sonoma Raceway in 2021

In August 2020, Reddick announced that he would return to the No. 8 for RCR for a second year. He again was close to winning, this time at Homestead-Miami Speedway. He climbed up to fourth with roughly ten to go and battled with Martin Truex Jr. and Kyle Larson. However, when he finally got by both of them for good, he did not have enough time to catch the race winner William Byron, despite having the fastest car on the track. Reddick's consistency and a fifth-place finish at the 2021 Coke Zero Sugar 400 at Daytona enabled him to make the playoffs for the first time. He was eliminated from the playoffs following the conclusion of the Round of 16 at Bristol. He finished the season thirteenth in the points standings.

==== 2022: First Cup wins and final season at RCR ====
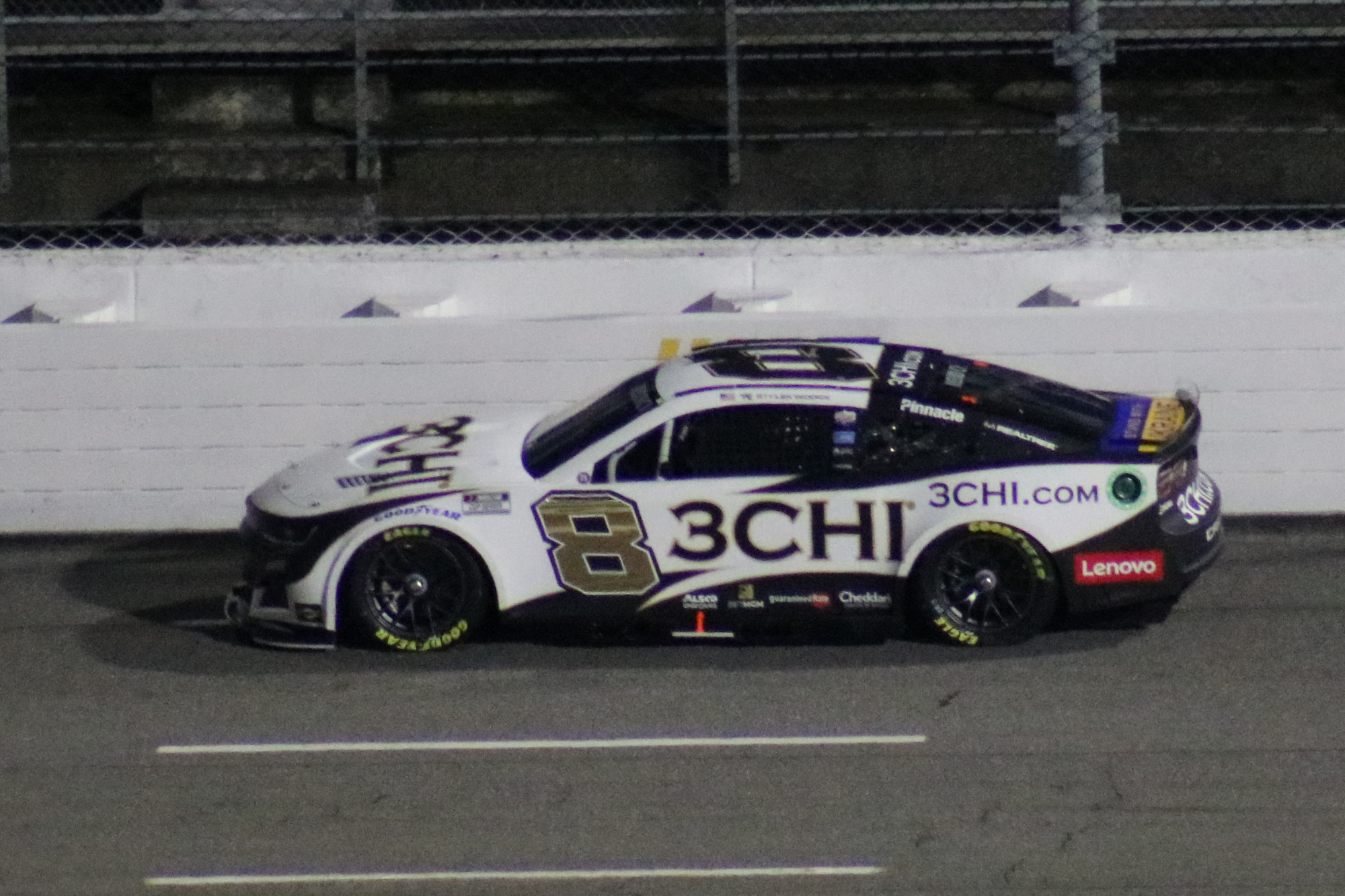
Reddick's No. 8 car at Martinsville Speedway in 2022

Reddick began the 2022 season with a 35th-place finish at the 2022 Daytona 500. At the Bristol dirt race, he battled Chase Briscoe for the lead on the closing laps when Briscoe lost control and caused both cars to slide on the final turn, leading to Reddick finishing second to Kyle Busch. At Road America, Reddick held off Chase Elliott to score his first career Cup Series win. On July 12, 2022, it was announced that Reddick had signed with 23XI Racing for a full-time Cup ride in 2024. At the Indianapolis Road Course, he held off the field in overtime to win his second race of the season. Reddick was eliminated in the Round of 16 after being involved in a multi-car pileup at the Bristol night race. Despite his elimination, he scored his third career win at Texas a week later. He retired from the Martinsville playoff race early, as he was not feeling well. He finished the season 14th in the points standings.

==== 2023: Start of tenure at 23XI Racing ====
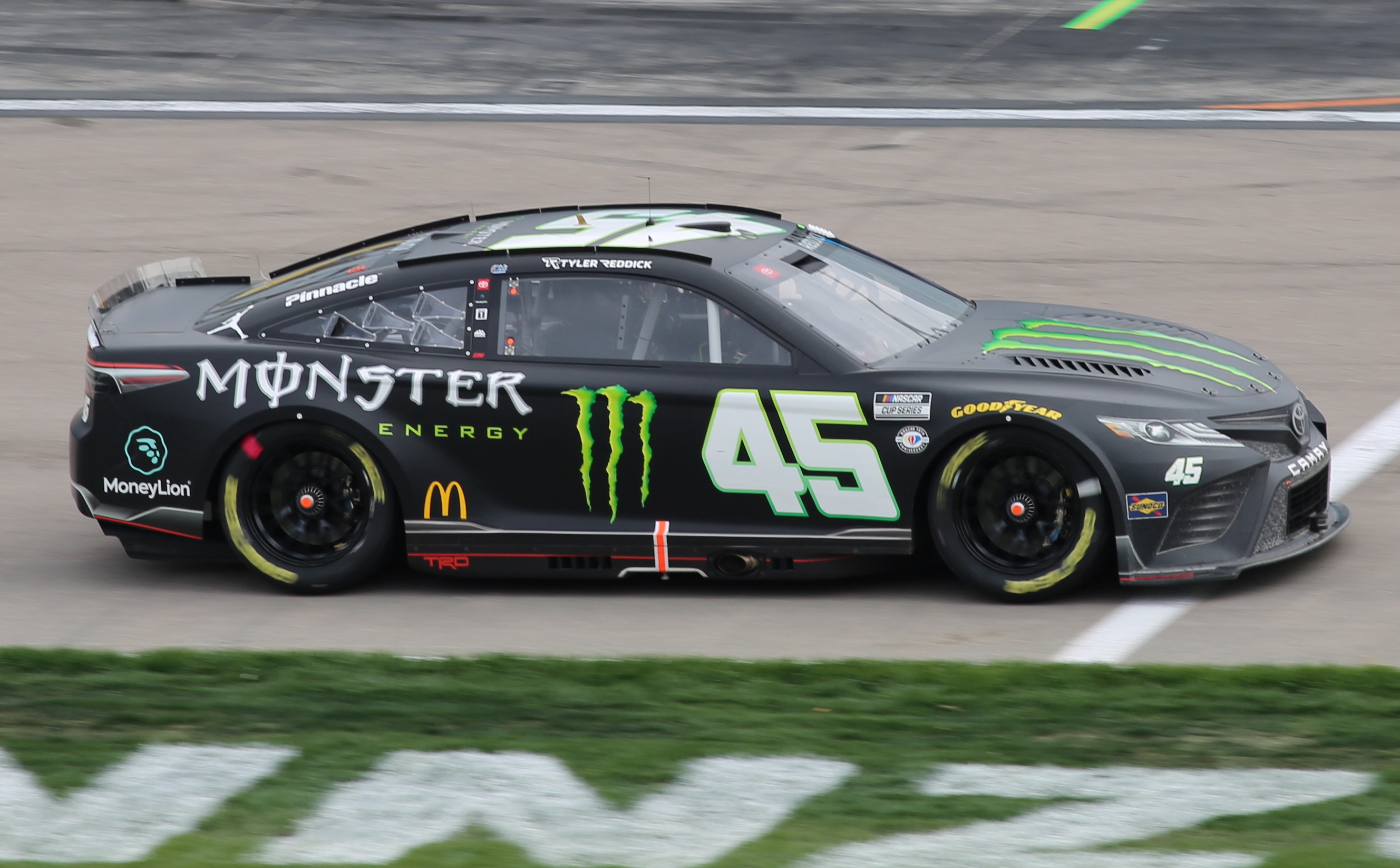
Reddick's No. 45 car at Las Vegas Motor Speedway in 2023

On October 15, 2022, 23XI Racing announced that it had bought out the remainder of Reddick's contract from RCR to replace Kurt Busch in the No. 45 for the 2023 season.

Reddick started the 2023 season with a 39th-place DNF at the 2023 Daytona 500. A month later, he scored his first win of the season at COTA in triple overtime, earning the first win for the No. 45 team since Kurt Busch's final career win in the 2022 Advent Health 400. On May 16, NASCAR docked the No. 45 team ten owner and driver points for unapproved ballasts during inspection prior to qualifying at Darlington. Although suffering from a small summer slump, Reddick was still able to qualify for the playoffs. During the playoffs, Reddick won at Kansas to advance to the Round of 12. He was eliminated at the conclusion of the Round of 8. He finished a career-high sixth in the points standings.

==== 2024: Regular Season Winner, and fight for the Championship ====
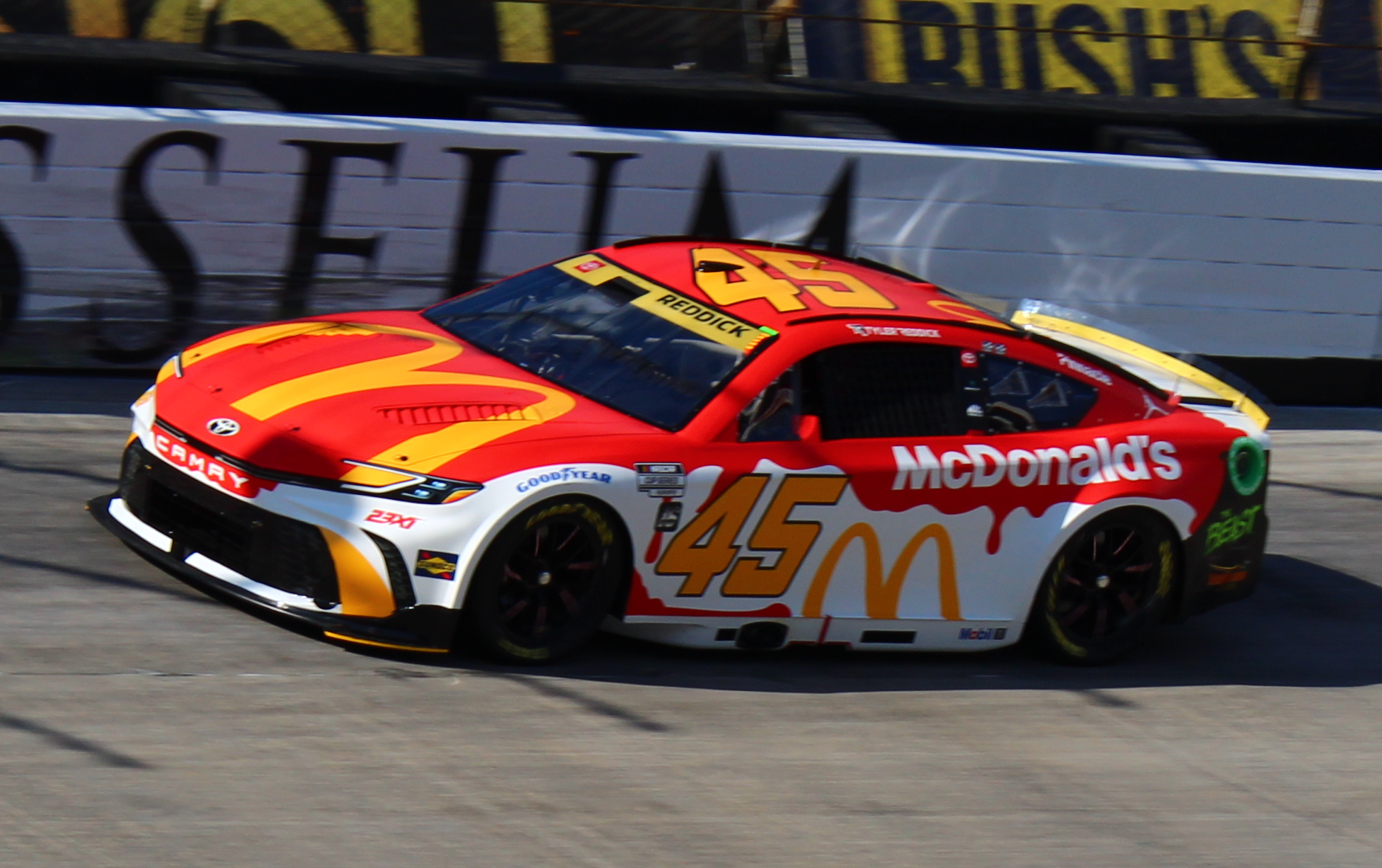
Reddick's No. 45 car at Bristol Motor Speedway in 2024

Reddick started the 2024 season with a 29th-place DNF at the 2024 Daytona 500. Following top-five and top-ten finishes, he scored his first win of the season at Talladega by overtaking Brad Keselowski on the final stretch after Keselowski spun Michael McDowell and triggered a multi-car crash. This was not just Reddick's first win of the season, but also Michael Jordan's first appearance at one of his driver's wins, in which he began celebrating with the team.

During the 2024 Goodyear 400, Reddick had a competitive car, sporting a throwback to former racer Tim Richmond. In this race, Reddick had a hard charge for the win with RFK Racing's Chris Buescher in a fight for the win. This fight for the win culminated in a dive to Buescher’s left in Turn 3. Reddick drifted high and came back up on the track into Buescher, who had no choice but to bounce off the SAFER barrier to his right. Following the race, Buescher unleashed his frustrations on Reddick with a shove and a stern discussion, saying "We don't have that sticker on right now!", in reference to the "Win and You're In" aspect of the Playoffs that required drivers to win to advance to the Playoffs. Reddick did not offer a defense for the contact and was apologetic after climbing out of his damaged No. 45 Toyota. He scored his second win of the season at Michigan.

Following the Southern 500, Reddick clinched the regular season championship, beating Kyle Larson by just one point, while suffering from a stomach bug throughout the race. He advanced to the Round of 8 after having an incredible run at the Charlotte Roval against Playoff contender Joey Logano, slowly gaining spots throughout the day as Logano lost spots. It was all for naught, however, as hours after the Roval race, Alex Bowman received a post-race penalty from NASCAR for not meeting weight requirements, dropping him to 38th as a result of being disqualified and promoting Reddick as the seventh driver to enter the Round of 8, whilst also advancing Logano.

On lap 90 at Las Vegas, Reddick, as well as Chase Elliott and Martin Truex Jr., were three-wide coming off Turn 4. Elliott's No. 9 was shoved up high into Reddick's No. 45, which spun them both out, also collecting Brad Keselowski's No. 6. As Reddick's car was sliding through the grass, the car clipped the pavement of the Legends oval on the front stretch and rolled over one time before landing on all four tires. Reddick finished 36th due to the accident.

Following the accident the week prior, Reddick entered a deep point deficit, and would need good races through the rest of the round to have any chance to make the Championship 4. At Homestead, Reddick did exactly that, having an incredible race all day. Once a caution flew with 11 to go, the drivers would restart as Reddick fought a tough battle with Ryan Blaney. In the final laps, Reddick closed in on Blaney and, while in turn 4 on the final lap, ran the outside line around Blaney and team-owner Denny Hamlin, to win the race and securing him a spot in the Championship 4 at Phoenix. Although Reddick made the Championship 4, he had a good, but overall weak run compared to the other championship contenders, finishing a new record high fourth in the standings with a sixth place finish.

==== 2025: Winless slump, familial struggles, and lawsuit ====
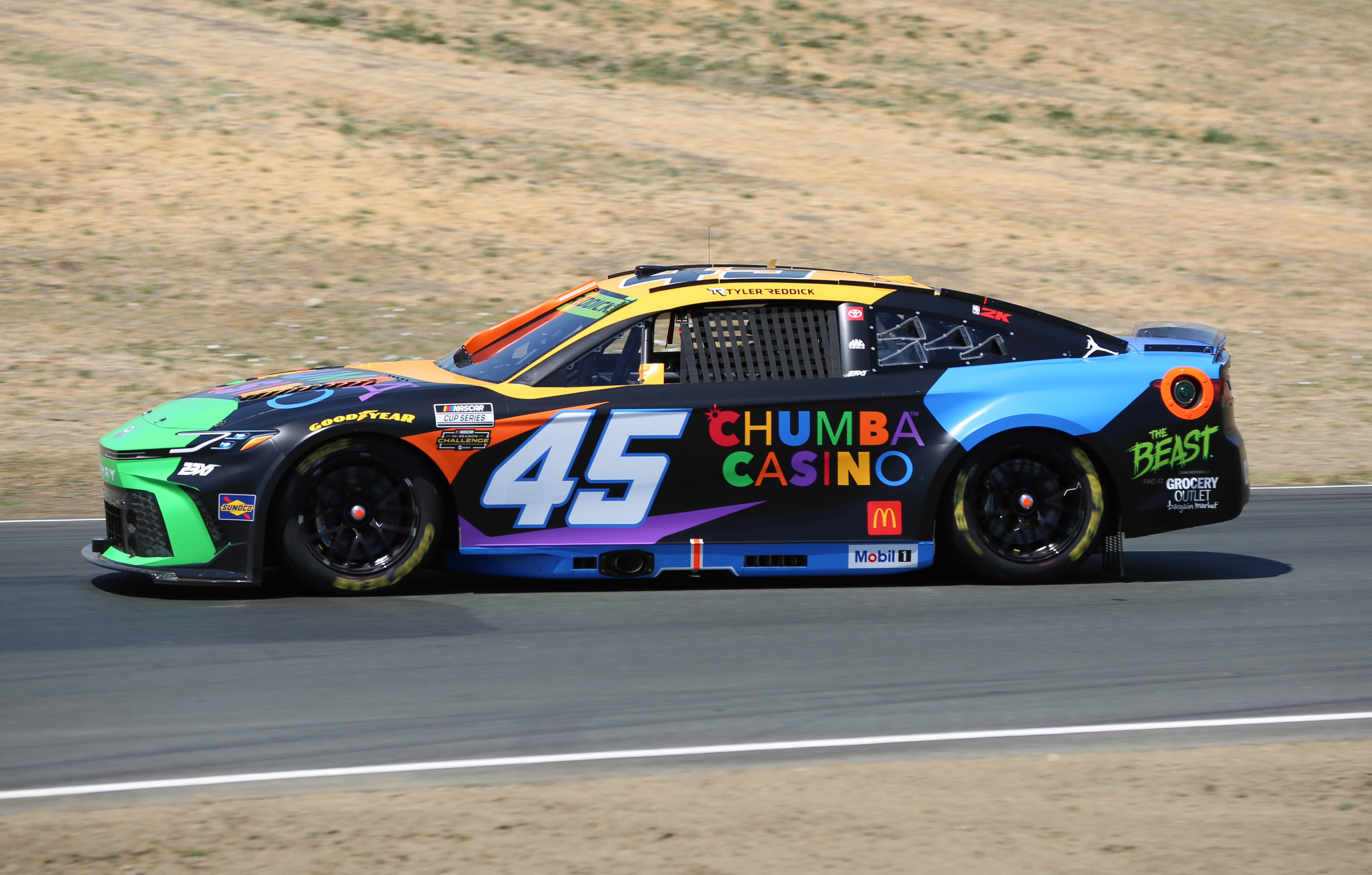
Reddick's No. 45 car at Sonoma Raceway in 2025

Reddick started the 2025 season with a runner-up finish at Daytona, as well as getting top-five finishes at COTA, Darlington, Atlanta, and Chicago. While Reddick's season was consistent, top-fives and top-tens were not as plentiful as they had been the years prior. Despite not scoring a win, he was consistent enough to make the playoffs, as well as being in contention to win the playoff-opening race at Darlington, but settled again for another runner-up finish. After being eliminated following the Round of 12, Reddick finished ninth in the points standings.

Reddick's season was very tough due to numerous issues, both career-wise and personal. While he suffered from not winning this year, he also had a personal scare as his newborn son, Rookie, suffered from a tumor, but would recover and would be released from the hospital as the season concluded. The lawsuit between his team owners and NASCAR also helped create worry and dissent, not just within 23XI Racing, but also fellow plaintiff and race team Front Row Motorsports. Events such as these helped contribute to more distractions that hurt the performance of drivers like Reddick.

==== 2026: Record-breaking season and dominance ====
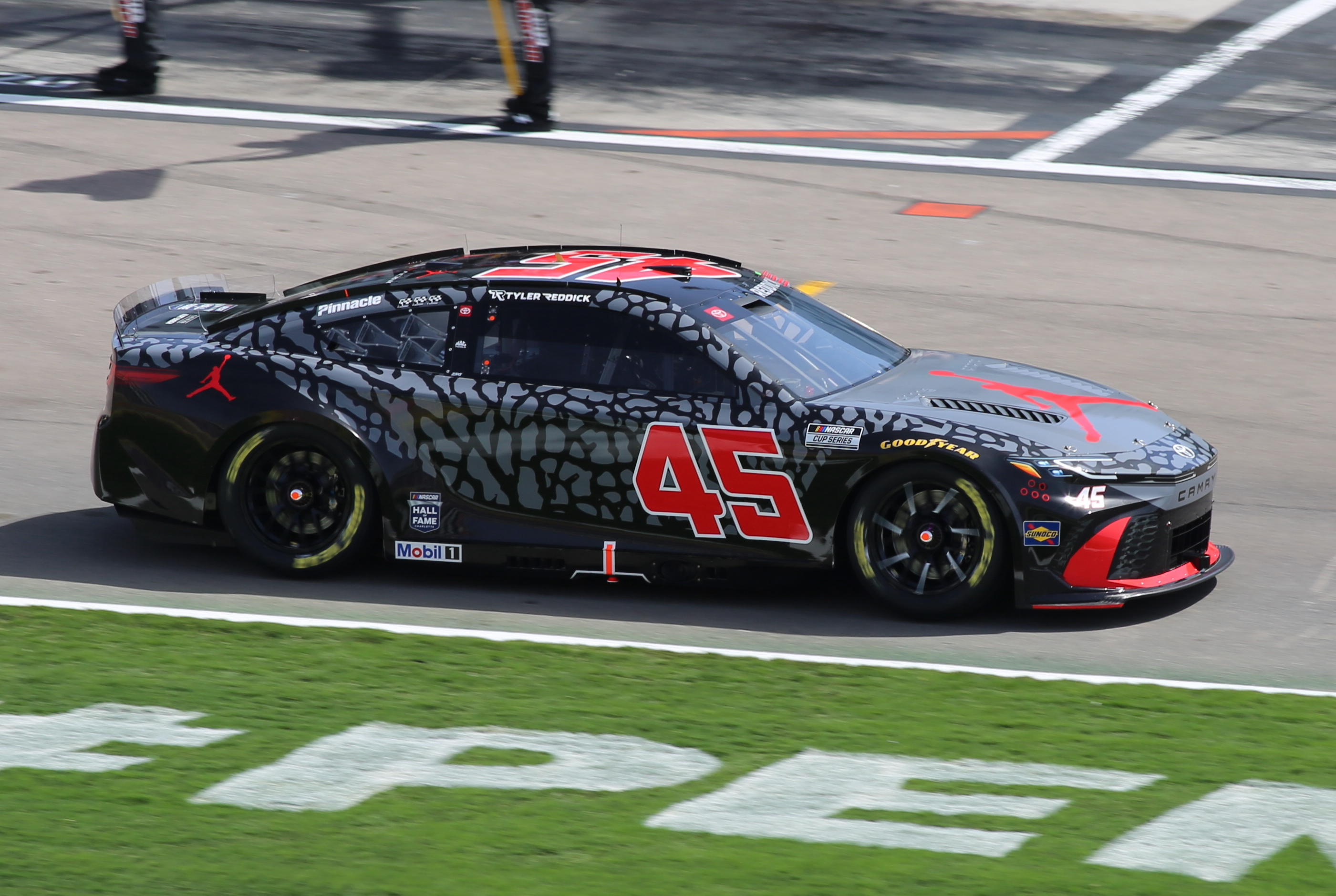
Reddick's No. 45 car at Las Vegas Motor Speedway in 2026

Entering a contract year for the 2026 season, Reddick started the season by winning the Daytona 500 in spectacular fashion. Following a late-race crash, Reddick restarted in second place. On the final lap, Reddick, sitting in fourth, missed a large last-lap pileup going into Turn 1 to run with the leaders for the win. Going into Turn 3, Reddick's teammate Riley Herbst would give him a tremendous push past Zane Smith and race leader Chase Elliott, which he would use in the final stretch to pass Elliott and win the Daytona 500 as they wrecked behind. This was not just Reddick's first Daytona 500 win, but also 23XI Racing's first Daytona 500 victory, and the first Toyota to win at Daytona since his team owner, Denny Hamlin, in 2020.

Despite being caught up in a wreck earlier in the race and suffering a significant amount of damage, Reddick was also able to charge a large run back to the lead to win the week following the Daytona 500 at Atlanta. This helped make Reddick the first driver since Matt Kenseth in 2009 to win the first two races of the season. The following week, running off the momentum he had earned the two weeks prior, he wiped the field and won at COTA, becoming the first driver to win the first three races of the season in NASCAR history.

As the early season continued, Reddick remained extremely consistent, winning the pole at Darlington, but suffering battery issues and falling far back into the field. He was able to reclaim his spots, however, and gained his fourth win of the season in the race. He won again after having a competitive race in Kansas following an overtime restart, becoming the first driver since Dale Earnhardt in 1987 to score five of the first nine races in a season. Reddick later signed a contract extension on April 26. After having no victories for the rest of the regular season, he won at Phoenix during "The Chase". Reddick ultimately led the series in wins with a career-high six.

== Personal life ==
Reddick was born in Corning, California and grew up most of his life in DuQuoin, Illinois and Peoria, Illinois. He attended DuQuoin Christian Fellowship School before transferring to homeschooling for the last two years and graduating in 2014. He is the grandson of Benny Brown, founder of BBR Music Group. Reddick is married to Alexa DeLeon, and the couple has two sons. Reddick has Obstructive sleep apnea.

== Motorsports career results ==
=== Stock car career summary ===
Season	Series	Team	Races	Wins	Top 5	Top 10	Points	Position
2012	NASCAR K&N Pro Series East	Curb Racing	1	1	1	1	47	47th
2012	ARCA Racing Series	Ken Schrader Racing	2	0	0	1	345	63rd
2013	NASCAR Camping World Truck Series	Ken Schrader Racing	1	0	0	0	14	77th
2013	NASCAR K&N Pro Series East	Ken Schrader Racing	1	0	0	0	25	62nd
2013	ARCA Racing Series	Cunningham Motorsports	1	0	0	0	160	111th
2014	NASCAR Camping World Truck Series	Brad Keselowski Racing	16	0	3	9	539	12th
2014	ARCA Racing Series	Cunningham Motorsports	1	0	1	1	205	78th
2015	NASCAR Camping World Truck Series	Brad Keselowski Racing	23	2	14	19	884	**2nd**
2016	NASCAR Camping World Truck Series	Brad Keselowski Racing	23	1	8	12	511	9th
2017	NASCAR Xfinity Series	Chip Ganassi Racing	18	1	4	6	484	18th
2018	NASCAR Xfinity Series	JR Motorsports	33	2	7	20	4040	**1st**
2019	NASCAR Cup Series	Richard Childress Racing	2	0	0	1	0	NC†
2019	NASCAR Xfinity Series	Richard Childress Racing	33	6	24	27	4040	**1st**
2020	NASCAR Cup Series	Richard Childress Racing	36	0	3	9	780	19th
2021	NASCAR Cup Series	Richard Childress Racing	36	0	3	16	2250	13th
2021	NASCAR Xfinity Series	Our Motorsports	3	0	0	1	0	NC†
2021	NASCAR Xfinity Series	RSS Racing with Reaume Brothers Racing	1	0	0	0	0	NC†
2021	NASCAR Xfinity Series	Jordan Anderson Racing	3	0	1	2	0	NC†
2022	NASCAR Cup Series	Richard Childress Racing	36	3	10	15	2215	14th
2022	NASCAR Xfinity Series	Big Machine Racing	5	1	2	2	0	NC†
2023	NASCAR Cup Series	23XI Racing	36	2	10	16	2344	6th
2023	NASCAR Xfinity Series	Sam Hunt Racing	2	0	0	0	0	NC†
2024	NASCAR Cup Series	23XI Racing	36	3	12	21	5031	4th
2024	NASCAR Xfinity Series	Sam Hunt Racing	1	0	0	0	0	NC†
2025	NASCAR Cup Series	23XI Racing	36	0	7	14	2309	9th
2026	NASCAR Cup Series	23XI Racing	22	5	10	14	802*	**2nd***

^{†} As Reddick was a guest driver, he was ineligible for championship points.

=== NASCAR ===
(key) (Bold – Pole position awarded by qualifying time. Italics – Pole position earned by points standings or practice time. * – Most laps led.)

==== Cup Series ====
NASCAR Cup Series results
Year	Team	No.	Make	1	2	3	4	5	6	7	8	9	10	11	12	13	14	15	16	17	18	19	20	21	22	23	24	25	26	27	28	29	30	31	32	33	34	35	36	NCSC	Pts	Ref
2019	Richard Childress Racing	31	Chevy	DAY; 27	ATL	LVS	PHO	CAL	MAR	TEX	BRI	RCH			KAN; 9	CLT	POC	MCH	SON	CHI	DAY	KEN	NHA	POC	GLN	MCH	BRI	DAR	IND	LVS	RCH	ROV	DOV	TAL	KAN	MAR	TEX	PHO	HOM	43rd	0^{1}	
2019	Beard Motorsports	62	Chevy										TAL; QL^{†}	DOV																										43rd	0^{1}	
2020	Richard Childress Racing	8	Chevy	DAY; 28	LVS; 18	CAL; 11	PHO; 33	DAR; 7	DAR; 13	CLT; 8	CLT; 14	BRI; 36	ATL; 16	MAR; 16	HOM; 4	TAL; 20	POC; 30	POC; 35	IND; 8	KEN; 10	TEX; 2	KAN; 13	NHA; 10	MCH; 18	MCH; 24	DRC; 18	DOV; 13	DOV; 18	DAY; 29	DAR; 23	RCH; 11	BRI; 4	LVS; 38	TAL; 7	ROV; 12	KAN; 25	TEX; 15	MAR; 24	PHO; 19	19th	780	
2021	Richard Childress Racing	8	Chevy	DAY; 27	DRC; 38	HOM; 2	LVS; 22	PHO; 29	ATL; 26	BRD; 7	MAR; 8	RCH; 20	TAL; 7	KAN; 7	DAR; 12	DOV; 8	**COA**; 9	CLT; 9	SON; 19	NSH; 18	POC; 11	POC; 9	ROA; 8	ATL; 6	NHA; 13	GLN; 10	IRC; 21	MCH; 29	DAY; 5	DAR; 18	RCH; 15	BRI; 12	LVS; 6	TAL; 39	ROV; 2	TEX; 9	KAN; 22	MAR; 18	PHO; 19	13th	2250	
2022	Richard Childress Racing	8	Chevy	DAY; 35	CAL; 24*	LVS; 7	PHO; 3	ATL; 28	COA; 5	RCH; 12	MAR; 18	BRD; 2*	TAL; 39	DOV; 30	DAR; 2	KAN; 30	CLT; 6	GTW; 16	SON; 35	NSH; 18	ROA; 1	ATL; 29	NHA; 21	POC; 2	**IRC**; 1*	MCH; 29	RCH; 31	GLN; 7	DAY; 2	DAR; 3	**KAN**; 35	BRI; 25	TEX; 1*	TAL; 28	ROV; 8	**LVS**; 6	HOM; 35	MAR; 35	PHO; 23	14th	2215	
2023	23XI Racing	45	Toyota	DAY; 39	CAL; 34	LVS; 15	PHO; 3	ATL; 5	COA; 1*	RCH; 16	BRD; 2	MAR; 22	TAL; 16	DOV; 7	KAN; 9	DAR; 22	CLT; 5	GTW; 35	SON; 33	NSH; 30	CSC; 28	ATL; 27	NHA; 6	POC; 2	**RCH**; 16	MCH; 30	IRC; 4	GLN; 8	DAY; 25	DAR; 2	KAN; 1	BRI; 15	TEX; 25	TAL; 16	**ROV**; 6	LVS; 8	HOM; 3	MAR; 26	PHO; 22	6th	2344	
2024	23XI Racing	45	Toyota	DAY; 29	ATL; 30	LVS; 2	PHO; 10*	BRI; 30	COA; 5	RCH; 10	MAR; 7	TEX; 4	TAL; 1	DOV; 11	KAN; 20	**DAR**; 32*	CLT; 4	GTW; 4	SON; 8*	IOW; 22	NHA; 6	NSH; 3	CSC; 2	POC; 6	**IND**; 2*	RCH; 3	MCH; 1	DAY; 28	DAR; 10	ATL; 6	GLN; 27	BRI; 20	KAN; 25	TAL; 20	ROV; 11	LVS; 36	**HOM**; 1*	MAR; 34	PHO; 6	4th	5031	
2025	23XI Racing	45	Toyota	DAY; 2	ATL; 19	**COA**; 3	PHO; 20	LVS; 24	HOM; 8	MAR; 14	DAR; 4	BRI; 18	TAL; 14	TEX; 21	KAN; 17	CLT; 26	NSH; 9	MCH; 13	MXC; 20	POC; 32	ATL; 4	CSC; 3	SON; 6	DOV; 12	IND; 29	IOW; 19	GLN; 9	RCH; 34	DAY; 21	DAR; 2	GTW; 16	BRI; 15	NHA; 21	KAN; 7	**ROV**; 10	LVS; 5	TAL; 7	MAR; 11	PHO; 26	9th	2309	
2026	23XI Racing	45	Toyota	DAY; 1	ATL; 1*	**COA**; 1*	PHO; 8	LVS; 13	**DAR**; 1	MAR; 15	BRI; 4	**KAN**; 1	TAL; 14	TEX; 4	GLN; 5	CLT; 4*	NSH; 6	MCH; 35	POC; 2	COR; 25	SON; 36	CHI; 36	ATL; 8	NWS; 30	IND; 10	IOW; 36	RCH; 11	**NHA**; 8	DAY; 3	DAR; 3	GTW; 25	BRI; 18	KAN; 11	LVS; 3	CLT; 8	PHO; 1	TAL; 37	MAR; 12	HOM; 2	5th	2397	
^{†} – Qualified for Brendan Gaughan

===== Daytona 500 =====
Year	Team	Manufacturer	Start	Finish
2019	Richard Childress Racing	Chevrolet	39	27
2020	Richard Childress Racing	Chevrolet	22	28
2021	Richard Childress Racing	Chevrolet	29	27
2022	Richard Childress Racing	Chevrolet	15	35
2023	23XI Racing	Toyota	26	39
2024	23XI Racing	Toyota	3	29
2025	23XI Racing	Toyota	11	2
2026	23XI Racing	Toyota	26	**1**

==== Xfinity Series ====
NASCAR Xfinity Series results
Year	Team	No.	Make	1	2	3	4	5	6	7	8	9	10	11	12	13	14	15	16	17	18	19	20	21	22	23	24	25	26	27	28	29	30	31	32	33	NXSC	Pts	Ref
2017	Chip Ganassi Racing	42	Chevy	DAY; 20	ATL	LVS	PHO; 14	CAL	TEX; 33	BRI	RCH	TAL; 20	CLT; 10	DOV	POC	MCH; 13	IOW; 3	DAY; 27	KEN; 10	NHA	IND; 37	IOW; 36	GLN	MOH	BRI; 11	ROA	DAR; 16	RCH; 17	CHI	KEN; 1*	DOV; 26	CLT	**KAN**; 2	TEX	PHO	**HOM**; 4	18th	484	
2018	JR Motorsports	9	Chevy	DAY; 1	ATL; 19	LVS; 8	PHO; 10	CAL; 7	TEX; 23	BRI; 7	RCH; 11	TAL; 8	DOV; 5	CLT; 23	POC; 9	MCH; 7	IOW; 8	CHI; 33	DAY; 31	KEN; 6	NHA; 25	IOW; 22	GLN; 11	MOH; 31	BRI; 9	ROA; 34	DAR; 3	IND; 2	LVS; 28	RCH; 7	ROV; 9	DOV; 14	KAN; 5	TEX; 2*	PHO; 6	HOM; 1	1st	4040	
2019	Richard Childress Racing	2	Chevy	**DAY**; 9	ATL; 5	LVS; 14	PHO; 3	**CAL**; 4	TEX; 2	BRI; 2	RCH; 4	TAL; 1*	DOV; 3	CLT; 1*	POC; 2	MCH; 1	IOW; 15	CHI; 9	**DAY**; 16	KEN; 3	NHA; 4	IOW; 5	GLN; 5	MOH; 4	BRI; 1	ROA; 3	DAR; 2*	IND; 30	LVS; 1	RCH; 10	ROV; 2	DOV; 12	KAN; 2	**TEX**; 29	PHO; 3	**HOM**; 1*	1st	4040	
2021	Our Motorsports	03	Chevy	DAY; DNQ	DRC																																80th	0^{1}	
2021	RSS Racing with Reaume Brothers Racing	23	Chevy			HOM; 40																															80th	0^{1}	
2021	Our Motorsports	23	Chevy				LVS; 12	PHO	ATL	MAR	TAL	DAR	DOV												MCH; 16	DAY	DAR; 7	RCH	BRI	LVS	TAL	ROV	TEX	KAN	MAR	PHO	80th	0^{1}	
2021	Jordan Anderson Racing	31	Chevy											COA; 8	CLT; 5	MOH	TEX	NSH; 15	POC	ROA	ATL	NHA	GLN	IRC													80th	0^{1}	
2022	Big Machine Racing	48	Chevy	DAY	CAL	LVS	PHO	ATL	COA	RCH	MAR	TAL	DOV	DAR; 26	TEX; 1	CLT	PIR	NSH; 21	ROA; 30	ATL; 4	NHA	POC	IRC	MCH	GLN	DAY	DAR	KAN	BRI	TEX	TAL	ROV	LVS	HOM	MAR	PHO	76th	0^{1}	
2023	Sam Hunt Racing	24	Toyota	DAY	CAL; 36	LVS; 13	PHO	ATL	COA	RCH	MAR	TAL	DOV	DAR	CLT	PIR	SON	NSH	CSC	ATL	NHA	POC	ROA	MCH	IRC	GLN	DAY	DAR	KAN	BRI	TEX	ROV	LVS	HOM	MAR	PHO	92nd	0^{1}	
2024	Sam Hunt Racing	26	Toyota	DAY	ATL	LVS	PHO	COA	RCH	MAR	TEX	TAL	DOV	DAR	CLT	PIR	SON	IOW	NHA	NSH; 14	CSC	POC	IND	MCH	DAY	DAR	ATL	GLN	BRI	KAN	TAL	ROV	LVS	HOM	MAR	PHO	96th	0^{1}	

==== Camping World Truck Series ====
NASCAR Camping World Truck Series results
Year	Team	No.	Make	1	2	3	4	5	6	7	8	9	10	11	12	13	14	15	16	17	18	19	20	21	22	23	NCWTC	Pts	Ref
2013	Ken Schrader Racing	52	Toyota	DAY	MAR	CAR; 30	KAN	CLT	DOV	TEX	KEN	IOW	ELD	POC	MCH	BRI	MSP	IOW	CHI	LVS	TAL	MAR	TEX	PHO	HOM		77th	14	
2014	Brad Keselowski Racing	19	Ford	DAY; 12	MAR; 16	KAN	CLT	DOV; 8	TEX; 21	GTW; 13	KEN	IOW; 9	ELD; 11	POC; 23	MCH	BRI	MSP	CHI; 4	NHA; 8	LVS; 15	**TAL**; 4	MAR; 6	**TEX**; 4	PHO; 10	HOM; 6		12th	539	
2015	Brad Keselowski Racing	19	Ford	DAY; 1*	ATL; 5	MAR; 5	KAN; 13	CLT; 4	DOV; 1	TEX; 11	GTW; 8	IOW; 3	KEN; 6	ELD; 3	POC; 3	MCH; 9	BRI; 8	MSP; 19	CHI; 2	NHA; 15	LVS; 7	TAL; 5	MAR; 5	TEX; 5	PHO; 5	HOM; 3	2nd	884	
2016	Brad Keselowski Racing	29	Ford	DAY; 18	ATL; 14	MAR; 20	KAN; 13	DOV; 7	CLT; 4	TEX; 5	IOW; 5	GTW; 25	KEN; 10	ELD; 5	POC; 26	**BRI**; 14	MCH; 19	MSP; 6	CHI; 10	NHA; 4	LVS; 1*	TAL; 26	MAR; 17	TEX; 4	PHO; 12	HOM; 2	9th	511	

^{*} Season still in progress
^{1} Ineligible for series points

=== ARCA Racing Series ===
(key) (Bold – Pole position awarded by qualifying time. Italics – Pole position earned by points standings or practice time. * – Most laps led.)

ARCA Racing Series results
Year	Team	No.	Make	1	2	3	4	5	6	7	8	9	10	11	12	13	14	15	16	17	18	19	20	21	ARSC	Pts	Ref
2012	Ken Schrader Racing	18	Chevy	DAY	MOB; 15	SLM; 8	TAL	TOL	ELK	POC	MCH	WIN	NJE	IOW	CHI	IRP	POC	BLN	ISF	MAD	SLM	DSF	KAN		63rd	345	
2013	Cunningham Motorsports	22	Dodge	DAY	MOB	SLM	TAL	TOL	ELK	POC	MCH	ROA	WIN	CHI	NJE	POC	BLN	ISF	MAD	DSF; 15	IOW	SLM	KEN	KAN	111th	160	
2014	Cunningham Motorsports	22	Dodge	DAY; 5	MOB	SLM	TAL	TOL	NJE	POC	MCH	ELK	WIN	CHI	IRP	POC	BLN	ISF	MAD	DSF	SLM	KEN	KAN		78th	205	

==== K&N Pro Series East ====
NASCAR K&N Pro Series East results
Year	Team	No.	Make	1	2	3	4	5	6	7	8	9	10	11	12	13	14	NKNPSEC	Pts	Ref
2012	Curb Racing	98	Dodge	BRI	GRE	RCH	IOW	BGS	JFC	LGY	CNB	COL	IOW	NHA	DOV	GRE	CAR; 1	47th	47	
2013	Ken Schrader Racing	52	Dodge	BRI; 19	GRE	FIF	RCH	BGS	IOW	LGY	COL	IOW	VIR	GRE	NHA	DOV	RAL	62nd	25	

Sporting positions
Preceded by William Byron	Daytona 500 Winner; 2026	Succeeded by Incumbent
Preceded by William Byron	NASCAR Xfinity Series Champion; 2018, 2019	Succeeded by Austin Cindric
Awards
Preceded by Chris Wall	Lucas Oil Late Model Dirt Series Rookie of the Year; 2011	Succeeded by Jonathan Davenport
