= Richard Lesley Voorhees =

American judge (born 1941)

Senior Judge of the United States District Court for the Western District of North Carolina
- Incumbent
- Assumed office August 31, 2017

Chief Judge of the United States District Court for the Western District of North Carolina
- In office 1991–1998
- Preceded by: Robert Daniel Potter
- Succeeded by: Graham Calder Mullen

Judge of the United States District Court for the Western District of North Carolina
- In office October 17, 1988 – August 31, 2017
- Appointed by: Ronald Reagan
- Preceded by: David B. Sentelle
- Succeeded by: Kenneth D. Bell

Personal details
- Born: June 5, 1941 (age 84) Syracuse, New York, U.S.
- Education: Davidson College (BA); University of North Carolina (JD)

Richard Lesley Voorhees (born June 5, 1941) is a senior United States district judge of the United States District Court for the Western District of North Carolina.

== Education and career ==
Voorhees was born in Syracuse, New York. He was in the United States Army as an ROTC cadet from 1959 to 1963. He received a Bachelor of Arts degree from Davidson College in 1963 and a Juris Doctor from the University of North Carolina School of Law in 1968. He was in the United States Army Signal Corps as a Lieutenant from 1963 to 1965. He was an Army Reserves Captain from 1965 to 1969, and was in private practice in Gastonia, North Carolina from 1968 to 1988.

=== Federal judicial service ===
On July 31, 1987, Voorhees was nominated by President Ronald Reagan to a seat on the United States District Court for the Western District of North Carolina vacated by Judge David B. Sentelle. He was confirmed by the United States Senate on October 14, 1988, and received his commission on October 17, 1988. He served as chief judge from 1991 to 1998. He assumed senior status on August 31, 2017.

== Sources ==
Legal offices
Preceded by David B. Sentelle	Judge of the United States District Court for the Western District of North Carolina; 1988–2017	Succeeded by Kenneth D. Bell
Preceded by Robert Daniel Potter	Chief Judge of the United States District Court for the Western District of North Carolina; 1991–1998	Succeeded by Graham Calder Mullen
