= Lacy Thornburg =

American judge

Lacy Herman Thornburg
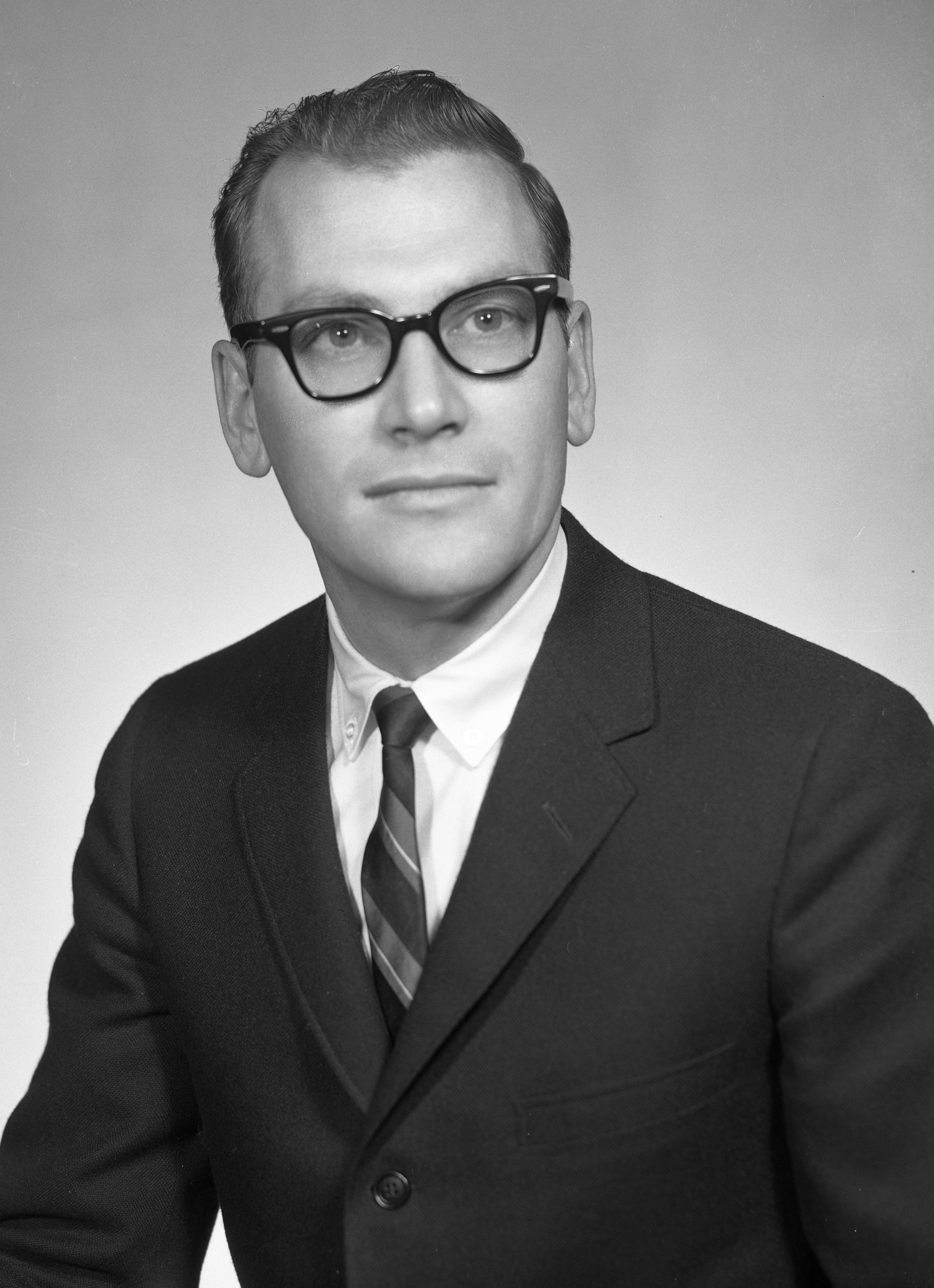
- c. 1965

Judge of the United States District Court for the Western District of North Carolina
- In office March 17, 1995 – August 31, 2009
- Appointed by: Bill Clinton
- Preceded by: Robert D. Potter
- Succeeded by: Max O. Cogburn Jr.

47th Attorney General of North Carolina
- In office 1985–1993
- Governor: James G. Martin
- Preceded by: Rufus Edmisten
- Succeeded by: Mike Easley

Member of the North Carolina House of Representatives from Jackson County
- In office 1961–1966
- Preceded by: Marcellus Buchanan
- Succeeded by: District abolished

Personal details
- Born: Lacy Herman Thornburg; December 20, 1929 (age 96) Charlotte, North Carolina, U.S.
- Party: Democratic
- Education: University of North Carolina (BA, JD)

Military service
- Allegiance: United States
- Branch/service: United States Army
- Years of service: 1947-1948
- Rank: Private First Class (PFC)

Lacy Herman Thornburg (born December 20, 1929) is an American lawyer and retired United States district judge of the United States District Court for the Western District of North Carolina. He served as the North Carolina attorney general from 1985 to 1993.

== Education and career ==
Thornburg was born in Charlotte, North Carolina. He received a Bachelor of Arts degree from the University of North Carolina in 1952. He received a Juris Doctor from the University of North Carolina School of Law in 1954. He was in the United States Army as a Private First Class from 1947 to 1948. He was in private practice of law in Webster, North Carolina from 1954 to 1967. He was a Member of the North Carolina House of Representatives from 1961 to 1966. He was a Special judge of the Superior Court of the 30th Judicial District of North Carolina from 1967 to 1971. He was a Resident judge of the Superior Court of the 30th Judicial District of North Carolina from 1971 to 1983. He was the state attorney general of State of North Carolina from 1985 to 1992. He was an Emergency judge of the Superior Court of the 30th Judicial District of North Carolina from 1993 to 1994. He was a Consultant for the National Indian Gaming Commission from 1994 to 1995.

== Gubernatorial campaign ==
In 1992, he unsuccessfully ran as a Democrat for Governor of North Carolina. He was defeated in the primary by former governor Jim Hunt, who went on to win the general election.

== Federal judicial service ==
Thornburg was a United States District Judge of the United States District Court for the Western District of North Carolina. Thornburg was nominated by President Bill Clinton on January 11, 1995, to a seat vacated by Robert D. Potter. He was confirmed by the United States Senate on March 17, 1995, and received commission the same day. He retired on August 31, 2009.

== Personal life ==
A stretch of U.S. Highway 23 in North Carolina is named for Thornburg. He is the father of Alan Z. Thornburg.

Party political offices
Preceded by Rufus Edmisten	Democratic nominee for Attorney General of North Carolina; 1984, 1988	Succeeded by Mike Easley
Legal offices
Preceded by Rufus L. Edmisten	Attorney General of North Carolina; 1985–1993	Succeeded by Mike Easley
Preceded by Robert Daniel Potter	Judge of the United States District Court for the Western District of North Carolina; 1995–2009	Succeeded by Max O. Cogburn Jr.
