= Robert Daniel Potter =

American judge (1923–2009)

Senior Judge of the United States District Court for the Western District of North Carolina
- In office May 1, 1994 – July 2, 2009

Chief Judge of the United States District Court for the Western District of North Carolina
- In office 1984–1991
- Preceded by: Woodrow W. Jones
- Succeeded by: Richard Lesley Voorhees

Judge of the United States District Court for the Western District of North Carolina
- In office October 29, 1981 – May 1, 1994
- Appointed by: Ronald Reagan
- Preceded by: Seat established by 92 Stat. 1629
- Succeeded by: Lacy Thornburg

Personal details
- Born: April 4, 1923 Wilmington, North Carolina, U.S.
- Died: July 2, 2009 (aged 86) Charlotte, North Carolina, U.S.
- Education: Stanford University (A.B.); Harvard University (LL.B.)

Robert Daniel Potter (April 4, 1923 – July 2, 2009) was a United States district judge of the United States District Court for the Western District of North Carolina.

== Education and career ==
Born in Wilmington, North Carolina, Potter received an Artium Baccalaureus degree from Duke University in 1947. He received a Bachelor of Laws from Duke University School of Law in 1950. He was a second lieutenant in the United States Army from 1944 to 1946. He was in private practice of law in Charlotte, North Carolina from 1951 to 1981. He was a Commissioner of Mecklenburg County, North Carolina from 1966 to 1968.

== Federal judicial service ==
Potter was a campaign worker for Republican Senator Jesse Helms of North Carolina, who recommended his appointment to the federal bench to President Ronald Reagan.

Potter was nominated by President Ronald Reagan on October 1, 1981, to the United States District Court for the Western District of North Carolina, to a new seat created by 92 Stat. 1629. He was confirmed by the United States Senate on October 29, 1981, and received commission the same day. He served as Chief Judge from 1984 to 1991. He assumed senior status on May 1, 1994, serving that status until his death on July 2, 2009, in Charlotte.

== Notable cases ==
Potter was known for sentencing convicted defendants to long terms at or near the maximum, a tendency that won him the nickname "Maximum Bob." Potter was the presiding judge in the 1989 trial of televangelist Jim Bakker, who Potter sentenced to 45 years in prison for multiple fraud and conspiracy accusations (the jury was not allowed to see the Heritage USA apartment complex that was 90 days from completion). In passing sentence, Potter stated: "Those of us who do have a religion are sick of being saps for money-grubbing preachers and priests." On appeal, the United States Court of Appeals for the Fourth Circuit affirmed the conviction but vacated the sentence, holding that "Regrettably, we are left with the apprehension that the imposition of a lengthy prison term here may have reflected the fact that the court's own sense of religious propriety had somehow been betrayed. In this way, we believe that the trial court abused its discretion."

In 1997, in the case of Swann v. Charlotte-Mecklenburg Board of Education, Potter ordered the termination of desegregation busing of students in the Charlotte-Mecklenburg School District, ruling that the district had achieved "unitary" status; i.e., that it had "eliminated, to the extent practicable, the vestiges of past discrimination in the traditional areas of school operations." The decision was overturned by the Fourth Circuit in 2000.

== Other service ==
Potter was a longtime financial supporter of Christendom College. He raised funds for the college and was a member of its advisory board.

== Personal life ==
Potter was Roman Catholic.

== Sources ==
Legal offices
Preceded by Seat established by 92 Stat. 1629	Judge of the United States District Court for the Western District of North Carolina; 1981–1994	Succeeded by Lacy Thornburg
Preceded by Woodrow W. Jones	Chief Judge of the United States District Court for the Western District of North Carolina; 1984–1991	Succeeded by Richard Lesley Voorhees
