= Steve Phelps =

American motorsports executive (born 1962)

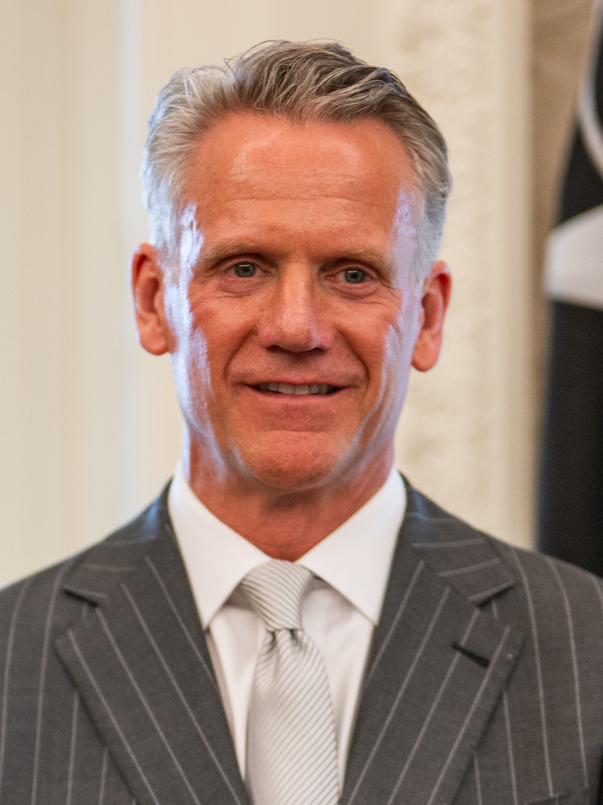
- Phelps in 2025

Commissioner of NASCAR
- In office March 31, 2025 – January 31, 2026
- Succeeded by: Steve O'Donnell

Personal details
- Born: December 23, 1962 (age 63) Burlington, Vermont, U.S.
- Spouse: Dina (div. 2024)
- Children: 4
- Education: University of Vermont (BA); Boston College (MBA)

Steve Phelps (born December 23, 1962) is an American motorsports executive. He was formerly the Commissioner of NASCAR.

== Early life ==
Phelps was born in Burlington, Vermont. As a young man, he attended stock car races at Catamount Stadium.

He attended University of Vermont and was a member of the track team. After graduating from UVM, Phelps obtained an MBA from Boston College.

== Career ==
After graduating college, Phelps worked in New York City for American Home Products as a brand manager for Chef Boyardee and later at Guinness.

In 1990, Phelps began working for the NFL, first as a marketing manager and eventually as a vice president of Corporate Marketing. He remained with the company until 2004.

After leaving the NFL, Phelps was recruited by Casey Wasserman to work at the Wasserman Media Group as head of global sales. After one year at WMG, Phelps left to work at NASCAR.

In July 2005, Phelps joined NASCAR, first as Vice President of Corporate Marketing. In January 2006, Phelps was promoted to Chief Marketing Officer. In January 2010, he was named Senior Vice President. In December 2013, he was named Executive Vice President. Phelps was named Chief Operating Officer in April 2018.

At NASCAR, Phelps won Adweek's Sports Marketing Executive of the Year. He also won Adweek's Brand Genius Award winner in the “sports” category.

In September 2018, it was announced that Phelps would be named the fifth President in NASCAR's history, succeeding Brent Dewar.

As President of NASCAR, Phelps oversaw the merger between NASCAR and the track-owning organization, International Speedway Corporation. He also led the introduction of NASCAR's Next Gen car in 2022. Phelps negotiated NASCAR's 2023 media rights deal, a seven-year, $7.7 billion in value. Phelps has also overseen significant innovation of NASCAR's schedule, including the Busch Light Clash at the Los Angeles Memorial Coliseum that debuted in 2022, the Chicago Street Race that debuted in 2023 and was named "Sports Event of The Year" at the Sports Business Journal's 2024 Sports Business Awards, NASCAR's first Cup Series points race in Mexico in 2025, and the introduction of the NASCAR In-Season Challenge in 2025.

Under Phelps' leadership, NASCAR launched NASCAR IMPACT in 2023, the sport's social responsibility and sustainability platform, which included committing to a number of important sustainability benchmarks, including the goal of net-zero operating carbon emissions by 2035.

In March 2025, Phelps was promoted to the position of NASCAR Commissioner. The position would allow him to take a bigger picture role of the sport, as well as overseeing international expansion, NASCAR's ownership of IMSA, and the 15 tracks NASCAR owns.

Phelps was twice named to the Sports Business Journal's list of "40 Under 40" list of influential sports businesspeople.

In 2010, Phelps was featured on an episode of the television program Undercover Boss.

In November 2025, as part of an antitrust lawsuit against NASCAR, it was revealed that Phelps referred to Richard Childress, owner of the RCR racing team, as a "stupid redneck who owes his entire fortune to NASCAR" and saying that "Childress needs to be taken out back and flogged" during the course of a text exchange that took place between Phelps and NASCAR Vice President Brian Herbst in 2023 while NASCAR was negotiating a new charter agreement with Childress.

On January 6, 2026, Phelps announced that he would be stepping away from NASCAR.

== Personal life ==
Phelps has four children, Katherine, Maddie, Jack, and Ryan.
