= Steve O'Donnell (NASCAR) =

American auto racing executive

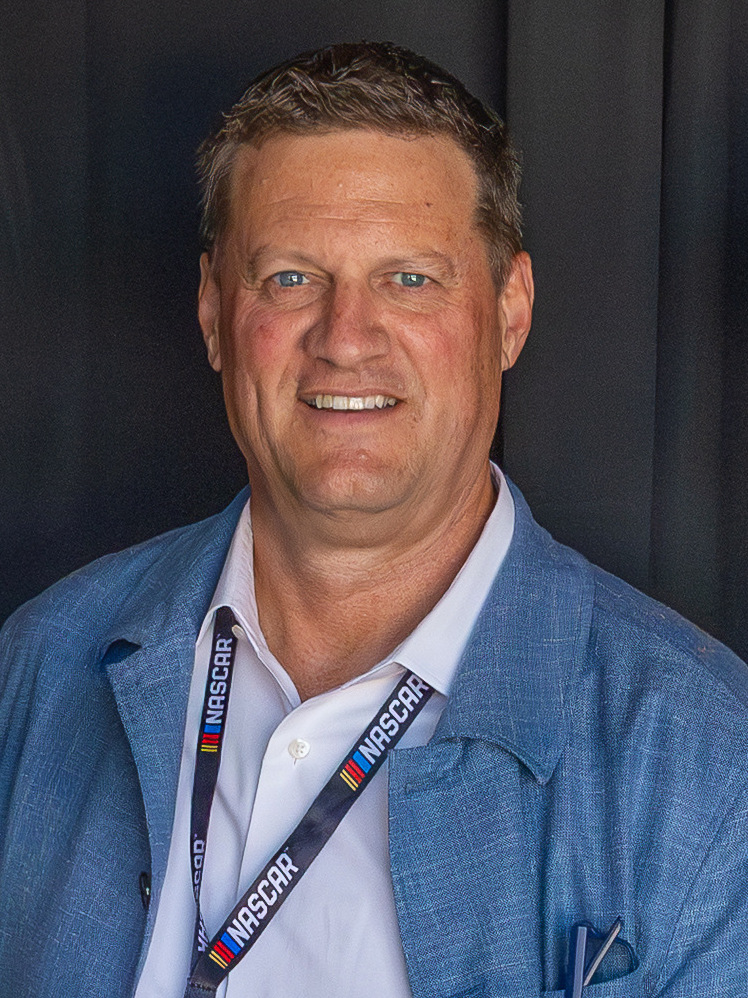
- O'Donnell at Texas Motor Speedway in 2026

President of NASCAR
- In office March 31, 2025 – April 24, 2026
- Preceded by: Steve Phelps
- In office CEO of NASCAR
- Incumbent
- Assumed office April 24, 2026
- Preceded by: Jim France

Personal details
- Born: November 3, 1968 (age 57) New Jersey, U.S.
- Education: Rollins College

Steve O'Donnell (born November 3, 1968) is an American motorsports executive. He is CEO of NASCAR.

== Early life ==
O'Donnell was born in New Jersey and was raised in Massachusetts. As a teenager, he and his family lived in Egypt near Cairo.

O'Donnell graduated from Rollins College in 1991. He then worked for a communications company before joining the Daytona Cubs and later the Florida Citrus Bowl.

== NASCAR ==
O'Donnell joined NASCAR in 1996 as part of the marketing department. Part of his role involved handing out hats in victory lane and placing sponsor products on the winning car for victory lane ceremonies. He was heavily involved in the planning and promotion of NASCAR's 50th Anniversary celebration in 1998.

O'Donnell was named managing director of Events and Operations of NASCAR's weekly racing series and his job involved traveling to the many local short tracks. He was soon promoted to Vice President of Racing Operations for the national series.

In 2014, O'Donnell was promoted to Chief Racing Development Officer. He was credited with implementing the NASCAR Playoff System in the top-three series, the creation of stage racing in 2017, and the development of the Next Gen car in 2022.

In March 2022, O'Donnell was named Chief Operating Officer of NASCAR. In March 2025, O'Donnell was promoted to President. In April 2026, O'Donnell was promoted to CEO, the first non-France family member to hold that position in NASCAR.

== Personal life ==
O'Donnell is married. The couple have a son and a daughter.
