= Joe Gibbs Racing v. Chris Gabehart =

2026 NASCAR non-compete agreement trial

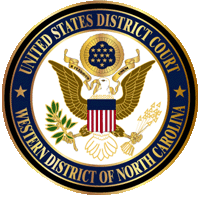
- Court: United States District Court for the Western District of North Carolina
- Full case name: Joe Gibbs Racing v. Chris Gabehart & Spire Motorsports
- Defendants: Chris Gabehart; Spire Motorsports
- Plaintiff: Joe Gibbs Racing

Court membership
- Judge sitting: Susan C. Rodriguez

Joe Gibbs Racing v. Chris Gabehart & Spire Motorsports is a pending case in which Joe Gibbs Racing alleges Chris Gabehart stole confidential team information before departing the organization and accepting a leadership role with Spire Motorsports.

== Background/Beginnings ==
Chris Gabehart was a former competition director and crew chief of Joe Gibbs Racing and requested a bigger and broader role from JGR. Joe Gibbs, the owner of JGR, declined Gabehart's request and Gabehart left the company on November 10. Gabehart returned his JGR work computer and phone. JGR claims that Gabehart photographed sensitive data from his company laptop, and synced proprietary files to a personal Google Drive folder labeled "Spire," which retained confidential team information.

== Pre–trial ==
On February 9, Gabehart was terminated from JGR. On February 19, 2026, two months and nine days after Gabehart left, it was announced that JGR filed a lawsuit against Gabehart regarding the information and leadership role and seeking damages of at least US$8 million. On February 21, 2026, Spire Motorsports confirmed Gabehart was hired as their Chief Motorsports Officer. Three days later, JGR filed an amended complaint which added Spire as a defendant and sought a temporary restraining order preventing Gabehart from working in a comparable competition role for Spire during the noncompete period, as well as barring both defendants from using or retaining confidential team information.

Later on the same day, Gabehart formally opposed the temporary restraining order and preliminary injunction and released his statement claiming that JGR was using the lawsuit to punish a former employee for daring to leave rather than protecting trade secrets, and denying that confidential team information was transmitted, distributed, or used. Gabehart also claimed that JGR had a dysfunctional organizational structure, claims he expressed "serious concerns" about how the No. 54 team was managed and how he was pressured by JGR to become a crew chief to Ty Gibbs back in June. On February 27, a hearing for the temporary restraining order request was held, and the court delayed the decision on the restraining order until March 2 to allow both parties to work on a resolution, which ended up not happening. On March 2, the court granted JGR the temporary restraining order against Gabehart, which prevented Gabehart from performing duties similar to a competition director at Spire, mandated the return of all JGR data, and put a US$100,000 bond in place. The request for the temporary restraining order against Spire was denied.

On March 1, JGR filed a motion for discovery against Spire and Gabehart, claiming that Spire encouraged Gabehart to acquire confidential team information as part of a job change. On that same day, Spire filed a declaration that shows Gabehart signed an agreement not to disclose JGR's confidential team information. On March 7, JGR filed an argument alongside declarations from multiple JGR employees, JGR driver Denny Hamlin, Toyota's Andy Graves, and Front Row Motorsports owner Bob Jenkins in support of expedited fact discovery. Alongside the arguments and multiple declarations, it was also revealed that JGR hired a private investigator that showed Spire owner Jeff Dickerson and Gabehart driving to and from a restaurant and sitting at the same table. JGR also claims that Spire was trying to poach their sponsors, SAIA and Zep.

On March 11, Spire and Gabehart addressed the declarations. Gabehart stated that Spire already had three crew chiefs and a competition director, and that his new job as Chief Motorsports Officer had no overlap with those two things. Gabehart also stated that Spire was more expansive, competing in more series than JGR and additionally with Spire's holding company TWG Motorsports adding even more motorsports to the umbrella. Dickerson filed his own declaration stating that he was surprised and disturbed to learn that JGR hired a private investigator to follow Gabehart around. He also stated that nobody from JGR informed Spire or himself that Gabehart's non-compete was applicable until the lawsuit. Dickerson also claims that they didn't want JGR's confidential team information, and it was useless due to engineering changing on a day-to-day and week-by-week basis.

On March 16, the preliminary injunction hearing was delayed again, and the courts granted both parties' motions of discovery. Also, JGR told the court that Gabehart, prior to meeting with Dickerson, had opened a JGR-owned file named "Project Howler" twice.

A few days later, on March 25, the statements following both discoveries were submitted. JGR claims that Gabehart deleted the texts prior to the lawsuit, stating: "Gabehart has now admitted the deletion of an unknown number of responsive text messages with Spire's co-owner, Dickerson communications deleted in the days immediately following his misappropriation depriving JGR of critical evidence and warranting an adverse inference that the deleted messages would have further implicated both Defendants in the joint misappropriation of JGR's trade secrets." JGR also accused Spire of using this lawsuit as a show. On March 26, Spire's president Bill Anthony filed a declaration stating that his team is not paying for Gabehart's legal fees. JGR asked the courts to expedite the trial process and have the trial as soon as possible before the 2026 Cup Series ends. Later that day, the preliminary injunction results were not decided. During the court hearing, JGR showed a photo of Gabehart sitting in the grandstands watching the Cup race at Darlington Raceway, claiming he was wearing a team headset and radio. Spire denied it was a team headset and radio, as it didn't have a microphone.

On April 1, JGR filed a motion for the courts to retrieve the deleted text messages from Gabehart's phone providers, while also obtaining third-party subpoenas from Haas Factory Team owner Joe Custer, Trackhouse Racing owner Justin Marks, Todd Meredith, Rick Ware Racing owner Rick Ware, and Tommy Baldwin Jr. Claiming that those who were in communication with Dickerson/Gabehart might have JGR's trade secrets and confidential team information, and this demonstrates irreparable harm. Eight days later, Spire and Gabehart responded that JGR's motion should be denied as the courts had already addressed and expanded expedited discovery well beyond the narrow scope the Court previously authorized, and needlessly pulled third parties into the litigation without even trying to articulate a factual basis. They also stated that JGR was clearly desperate but failed to identify that Gabehart gave out the confidential team information. Gabehart did not object to the subpoenas to recover the deleted texts but thinks that getting the third-party subpoenas from the other teams is harassment, as the courts already had denied gaining those subpoenas due to lack of evidence on JGR's part. Dickerson also responded that if the courts granted third-party discovery of his personal devices, the court should authorize reciprocal third-party discovery of communications contained on personal devices belonging to JGR's owners and employees. He also stated that he has not shared any of JGR's trade secrets or confidential information with any of the individuals or their teams for whom JGR requested subpoenas, and questioned why JGR hasn't asked for a subpoena from Hendrick Motorsports, as that is the team with whom they traded information.

On April 13, JGR filed another declaration claiming that Gabehart violated the restraining order as he was wearing a team radio and looking at data during the 2026 Food City 500 practice and qualifying, as well as the race itself. JGR claims that executives who don't have input into competition typically are not actively engaged in practice or qualifying sessions, which violates the TRO. Later the same day, Gabehart's legal team filed a response claiming that his radios didn't have microphones on them and he was watching the TVs on the tool cart and wasn't doing anything that a competition director would do, they went on and compared his job to Jeff Gordon's job at HMS. They also brought up the former JGR COO's move to Legacy Motor Club and that JGR didn't prevent or even protest the move if they were concerned about the confidential team information. Finally, they asked the courts to disregard JGR's claims: "Unable to substantiate its claims, JGR has resorted to stalking Mr. Gabehart at racetracks, then rushing to this Court to spin routine behavior into suggested misconduct and it is an improper attempt to introduce surveillance photos as evidence outside the briefing schedule."

On April 23, the courts granted JGR a partial injunction against Gabehart, preventing him from performing similar duties to those he did at JGR, but did not prevent him from doing his job at Spire or attending races. The injunction against Spire was denied.

On May 6, a trial date was set for January 2027, which is between JGR's requested date of November 2026 and Gabehart/Spire's requested date of April/May 2027. Alongside the trial date, JGR filed two amendments, claiming that Spire improved with their Talladega win and also claiming that "Chief Motorsports Officer" is a workaround title for competition director and that the job title is nonexistent. Also on May 6, the court half-granted JGR's request for a subpoena from Dickerson Communications between him and Gabehart but declined a subpoena between Dickerson and HFT, Trackhouse Racing, and RWR.

On June 15, JGR filed a second amended complaint that was similar to their first, besides stating JGR has intel from one of the Spire employees that Gabehart is participating in and leading competition meetings at Spire, which it believes is a violation of their non-compete agreement.

On June 25, Spire countersued JGR for unjust enrichment, claiming that "JGR breached their trade deal by not releasing a JGR employee selected by Spire from contractual restrictions so that Spire could employ that person, or paying Spire US$100,000, within a reasonable time". Gabehart also countersued JGR, claiming that JGR was slow to act on their separation agreement process, including wage withholding, as a form of leverage. Gabehart also claimed that JGR is in violation of numerous laws involving client attorney privileges, when Gabehart turned over his electronic devices, Gabehart says "JGR collected information that exceeded this legal matter". Finally, Gabehart also claims that the only reason he left JGR was because they wanted him to only focus on the No. 54 car and do crew chief roles outside of his role as competition director, even paying from another business, dubbed as Ty Gibbs Racing, LLC.

On July 15, the trial date was moved from January 2027 to February 2027. On July 29, JGR withdrew the claim that it had intel from one of the Spire employees that Gabehart was participating in and leading competition meetings at Spire. JGR says "it does not possess nonprivileged information sufficient to support the allegations." The courts granted the withdrawal. On August 26, the courts upheld Gabehart and Spire's countersuits against JGR, but allowed JGR to refile a dismissal at a future date as an option.

On September 17, JGR asked the court to hold Gabehart and Spire in contempt, claiming that the title "Chief Motorsports Officer" and the role of "all things racing" are deceptive and that Spire failed to impose restrictions on Gabehart. JGR also claims that they have testimony that Gabehart attended five at least to twelve at most competition meetings, and Spire only provided video and notes of one meeting. On September 25, a nonparty HMS made a filing to the courts stating that JGR was trying to obtain their confidential information and trade secrets through Spire.

On October 1, both parties went over what was found in the discovery process. Spire argued that JGR was asking for more documents from Spire even though the discovery process had ended. JGR claims that despite Gabehart giving up all his work devices to JGR in February, Gabehart still had access to JGR confidential information and trade secrets until June. HMS and JGR made an agreement that JGR would not get any info regarding HMS, and another nonparty, Toyota Racing Development, told the courts that they did not tell JGR to file the lawsuit nor did they want to be a part of it. On October 7, 2026 the courts ordered that JGR must provide full TRD agreement and all JGR–TRD contracts, Spire and JGR must provide final race setups for 2025 & 2026, and Spire must provide debriefs/all competition meeting notes and materials from Cup races Gabehart attended.

On October 9, 2026, Spire reported that they placed Gabehart on administrative leave over the past month. JGR then claims that is proof of contempt for violating a restraining order and preliminary injunction. On October 20, it was reported that JGR upped the damages from US$8 million to US$150 million from Gabehart and Spire. On November 9, 2026, JGR paid Spire US$100,000 for one of the June 25 countersuit claims regarding releasing another Spire employee to JGR.
