= Charles Jonas =

Charles Jonas may refer to:

- Charles A. Jonas (1876–1955), congressman from North Carolina
- Charles R. Jonas (1904–1988), congressman from North Carolina
- Charles Jonas (Wisconsin politician) (1840–1896), Czech journalist then Wisconsin journalist and politician
