= Ruben J. Dailey =

American politician (1910–1981)

Ruben Jasper Dailey (24 January 1910, Asheville - 8 January 1981, Asheville was the first African American attorney to practice in Buncombe County, North Carolina, which includes Asheville. Dailey worked to press the issue of school integration not only in Buncombe County, but also across Western North Carolina in order to level the educational playing field and ensure that the mandate of Brown v. Board of Education was observed. He handled a multitude of county cases; "[i]n county after county, attorney Ruben J. Dailey confronted school boards who were trying to find ways to ignore the law and to overlook students with black skin." In addition to being Buncombe County's first black lawyer, in 1969, Ruben Dailey became the first black Asheville City Council member. He was reelected in 1971 and at some time subsequent to that reelection, he retired from politics due to health issues.

== Participation in integration in Transylvania County, NC ==
In 1962, long after the 1954 decision in Brown, schools in Transylvania County, North Carolina were not yet fully integrated. In order to attain a high school education, many black students were making a 42-mile round trip to the Ninth Avenue School in Hendersonville, in neighboring Henderson County, North Carolina. The exasperated parents, tiring of excuses from the local school board, filed in U.S. District Court on August 17, 1962 seeking relief under the Brown decision, which they received in 1963.

Despite gradual high school integration after the summer of 1962, the school board limited the number of black students who could attend Brevard High, citing lack of space, and requested that parents of black children have patience while a larger facility was being constructed. Parents of the children and other community members, organized as the Transylvania Citizens Improvement Organization (TCIO), soon discovered that upon completion of the addition to Brevard High there was unused space and black students were still traveling to neighboring Henderson County to receive a secondary education.

After this discovery, the Members of TCIO hired Ruben J. Dailey to represent them if a legal proceeding was required. Mr. Dailey succeeded in obtaining an order from the U.S. District Court for the Western District of North Carolina; in March 1963, Judge Wilson Warlick called for the integration of the "junior and senior high schools" in Transylvania County and "directed attorney Ruben J. Daily to prepare the order for his [Judge Warlick's] signature." After the decision declaring full integration of Transylvania County's secondary schools, a reporter for The Transylvania Times wrote, "[l]ast year [1962] Ruben J. Bailey [sic], Asheville attorney, petitioned the courts to admit 40 Negro junior and senior high school students to the Brevard schools. The courts ruled that eight be permitted to attend during the 1962-63 term."

== See also ==
- Timeline of African-American firsts
- School integration in the United States
