= Greg Newman (politician) =

American attorney and politician (born 1961)

District Attorney for North Carolina Prosecutorial District 42
- In office July 23, 2013 – April 27, 2021
- Preceded by: Jeff Hunt
- Succeeded by: R. Andrew Murray

Mayor of Hendersonville, North Carolina
- In office December 8, 2005 – December 10, 2009
- Preceded by: Fred Niehoff
- Succeeded by: Barbara Volk

Personal details
- Born: Gregory Alan Newman; November 25, 1961 (age 64) Henderson County, North Carolina
- Party: Republican
- Education: University of North Carolina at Asheville; University of Dayton School of Law

Gregory Alan Newman (born November 25, 1961) is an American attorney and politician who was mayor of Hendersonville, North Carolina from 2005 to 2009 and district attorney for Henderson, Transylvania, and Polk counties from 2013 until his removal from office in 2021.

== Early life ==
A native of Henderson County, Newman graduated from the University of North Carolina at Asheville and the University of Dayton School of Law. He worked in private practice in Ohio and in a district attorney's office in Tennessee before returning to Hendersonville in 2000.

== Politics ==
In 2000, Newman was elected mayor of Hendersonville by a two to one margin over city councilor Ron Stephens. He did not run for reelection in 2009.

In 2010, Newman ran for the United States House of Representatives seat in North Carolina's 11th congressional district, which was held by Democrat Heath Shuler. He finished third in the Republican primary.

In 2013, Governor Pat McCrory appointed Newman to fill the unexpired term of Judicial District 29B district attorney Jeff Hunt, who had been appointed to the North Carolina Superior Court bench. He was elected uncontested to a full term in 2014 and reelected in 2018.

In 2019, Newman was reprimanded by the North Carolina state bar for conflict of interest after he agreed to a plea bargain with a defendant he had previously worked for as a defense attorney. In 2020, he was issued a three-year stayed suspension by the state bar for making false statements to a judge and a victim in a 2015 child rape case.

In 2021, the families of alleged rape and murder victims petitioned to have Newman removed from office. On March 17, 2021, Judge Robert C. Ervin found probable cause to conduct a public hearing into allegations that Newman had committed "willful misconduct in office" and had "conduct prejudicial to the administration of justice which brings the office into disrepute". On April 27, 2021, Ervin ruled that while serving as DA, Newman had "on four separate occasions made false representations to the trial court or the State Bar" and removed him from office. It was the third time in the state's history that a DA had been removed from office (Jerry Spivey was removed in 1995 and Tracey Cline was removed in 2012).
