= Dena J. King =

American lawyer (born 1981)

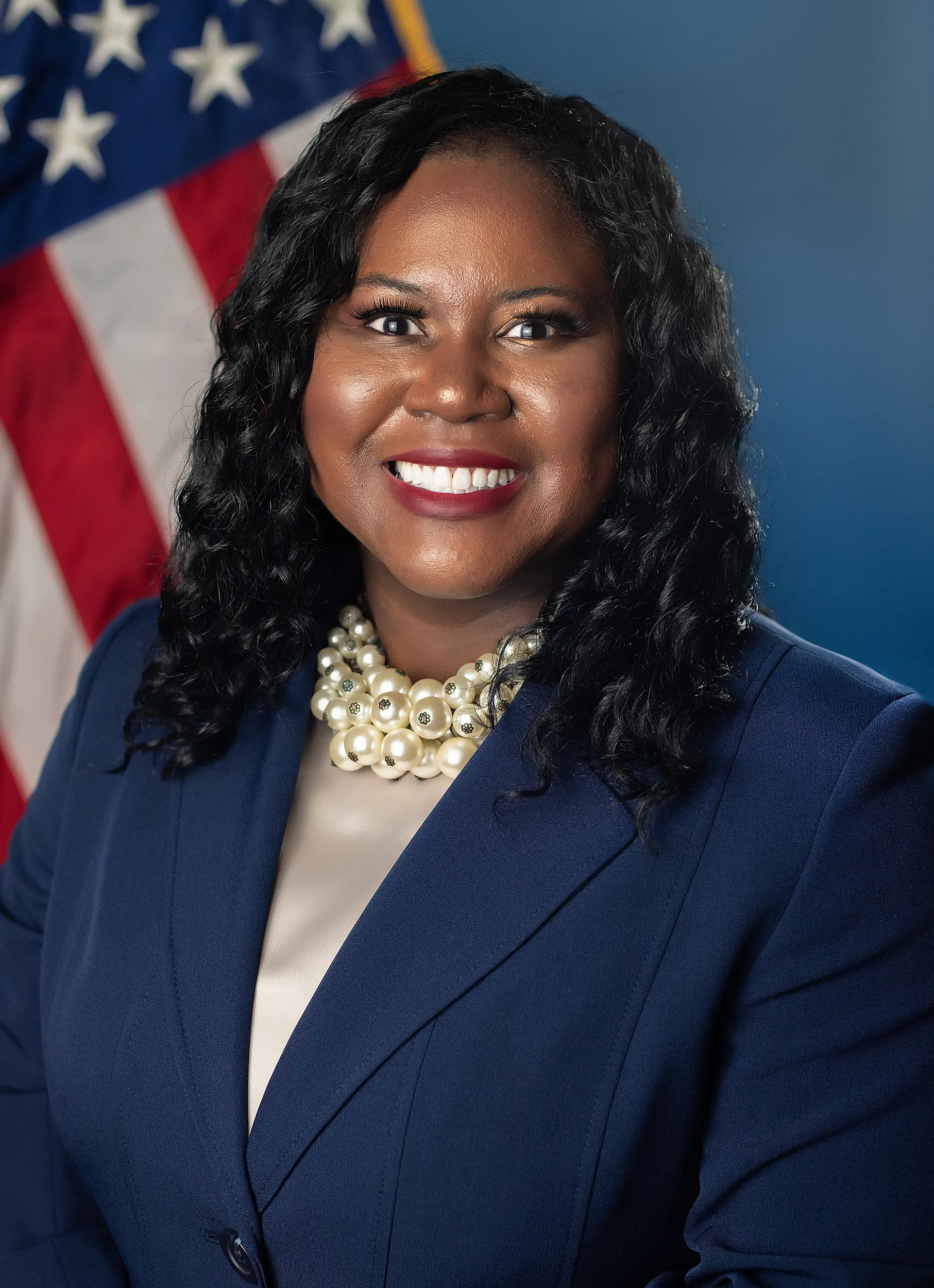

United States Attorney for the Western District of North Carolina
- In office November 29, 2021 – February 12, 2025
- President: Joe Biden; Donald Trump
- Preceded by: R. Andrew Murray; William T. Stetzer (acting)
- Succeeded by: Lawrence J. Cameron (acting); Russ Ferguson

Personal details
- Born: Dena Janae King; 1981 (age 44–45) Charlotte, North Carolina, U.S.
- Education: North Carolina State University (BS); North Carolina Central University (JD)

Dena Janae King (born 1981) is an American lawyer and who had served as the United States attorney for the Western District of North Carolina.

== Education ==
King received her Bachelor of Science, magna cum laude, from the North Carolina State University in 2003 and her Juris Doctor from North Carolina Central University School of Law in 2006.

== Career ==
From 2006 to 2008, King served as an Assistant District Attorney at the Mecklenburg County District Attorney's Office in Charlotte, North Carolina. From 2009 to 2014, she served as an enforcement attorney in the Securities Division at the North Carolina Department of State. From 2014 to 2020, she served as a Special Assistant United States Attorney and then as an Assistant United States Attorney in the United States Attorney's office for the Eastern District of North Carolina. From 2020 to 2021, she served as an Assistant United States Attorney in the United States Attorney's office for the Western District of North Carolina while having the duties of deputy criminal chief for the violent crimes, organized crime drug enforcement task forces, and narcotics units.

=== United States attorney for the Western District of North Carolina ===
On September 28, 2021, President Joe Biden nominated King to be the United States Attorney for the Western District of North Carolina. On October 28, 2021, her nomination was favorably reported out of committee by a voice vote. On November 19, 2021, her nomination confirmed in the United States Senate by voice vote. She was sworn in on November 29, 2021, by Chief Judge Martin Karl Reidinger. Upon confirmation, King became the first Black person or person of color to serve as U.S. Attorney in the Western District of North Carolina.

After leaving the Department of Justice, King joined the Charlotte-based law firm Parker Poe Adams & Bernstein LLP as a partner in the firm’s Charlotte office.

Legal offices
Preceded by R. Andrew Murray; William T. Stetzer; Acting	United States Attorney for the Western District of North Carolina; 2021–present	Incumbent
