= Charles R. Jonas Federal Building =

Historic structure in North Carolina, US

- U.S. National Register of Historic Places
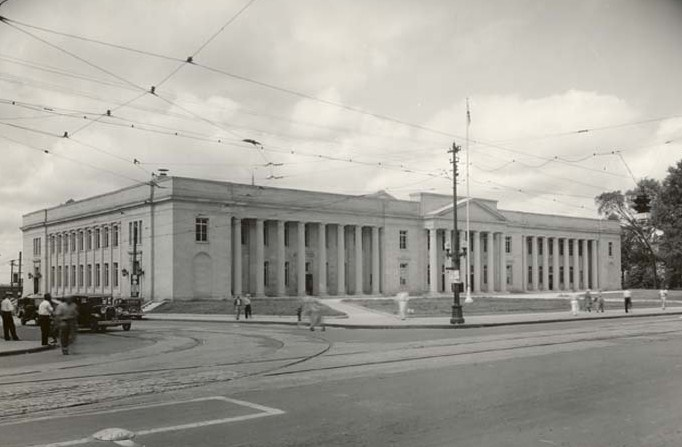
- Charles R. Jonas Federal Building

- Location within North Carolina Location within the United States
- Location: 401 W. Trade St., Charlotte, North Carolina
- Coordinates: 35°13′49″N 80°50′49″W
- Area: 2.9 acres (1.2 ha)
- Built: 1915
- Architect: Wetmore, James A.
- Architectural style: Classical Revival, Renaissance
- NRHP reference No.: 78001965
- Added to NRHP: June 7, 1978

The Charles R. Jonas Federal Building, also known as the United States Post Office and Courthouse, is an historic structure located at 401 West Trade Street, in Charlotte, North Carolina, which has served at various times as a courthouse of the United States District Court for the Western District of North Carolina, and a United States post office. Designed by the Office of the Supervising Architect under James A. Wetmore, it was completed in 1915; the building was renamed in honor of long-serving North Carolina Congressman Charles R. Jonas, and was transferred to the city in exchange for land in the fall of 2005, and has been leased back to the federal government for continued use.

== History ==
The Charles R. Jonas Federal Building is located on a site important to the history of Charlotte, and is one of the few historic structures remaining in the Central Business District.

The first branch of the U.S. Mint had been built on the northeast section of the site in 1836, and in 1891, a Post Office facility was built on the southwest portion of the site. The space between the two buildings was converted to a park/plaza. In 1913 the Mint functions were discontinued (the building eventually becoming the Mint Museum) and the 1891 post office building was torn down. In 1915 the first portion of what would later become the Charles R. Jonas Federal Building, a new post office, was built on the site of the older one. In 1934 an addition to the original Post Office was completed on the site of the Mint. The addition tripled the size of the original and changed the orientation of the main facade and entry of the building to West Trade Street at the southeast.

The site of the Federal building has historically been used for U.S. government buildings. That use continues today as the site of the Jonas Federal Building where the 1915-1934 building remains a symbol of the Federal presence in Charlotte. It is, in fact, the busiest statutory location for holding Federal Court in the Western District of North Carolina. Although the settlement of Charlotte dates from the colonial period, it is very much a symbol of the "new South". It has become one of the nation's most important financial and marketing centers. As a result of this, the Central Business District is now largely given over to commercial enterprises housed in new buildings. Therefore, in addition to representing the Federal government in Charlotte, the Charles R. Jonas Federal Building is one of the few historic structures remaining in the Central Business District.

== Architectural description ==
The building is a two-story Neoclassical limestone structure. The main elevation (northeast) faces West Trade Street. It features a full-length colonnade, with a projecting central temple-front pavilion. On either side of the central pavilion are colonnades divided into eight bays. Massive, monolithic Corinthian columns support an entablature with denticulated cornice. Each of the three entry doors has an elaborate limestone surround featuring fluted engaged pilasters which support a decorative cornice. There are two secondary entrances with decorative limestone surrounds set within the flanking colonnades.

The southeast elevation is the main elevation of the original 1915 building and features two entries, one at either end. The entry doors are set within projecting corner pavilions. The decorative door surrounds feature fluted engaged pilasters which support a classical cornice. Flanking each entry door are original bronze wall-mounted lanterns. The central pavilion of the elevation is expressed as nine bays delineated by engaged Corinthian pilasters. The denticulated cornice and unembellished frieze are present on the southeast, northwest, and northeast.

The northwest elevation reflects the design of the southeast elevation though there are no main entry doors here. The central portion of the facade is divided into nine bays delineated by engaged pilasters. Due to the slope of the site, basement windows are above grade on this elevation. The southwest elevation features a distinctive original copper-clad loading dock.

Significant interior spaces include the main lobby and the ceremonial courtroom on the second floor. The L-shaped lobby, once a Post Office sales area, retains its original marble floors, wainscot, pilasters, light fixtures and ornamental plaster ceiling. The 1930s courtroom features wood paneling and carved door surround. An effort has been made to retain original woodwork in the second floor office spaces.
