= Gretchen Shappert =

American lawyer

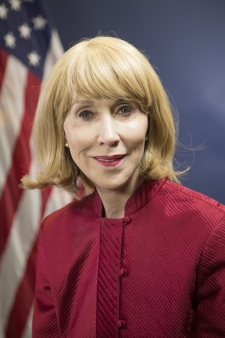

United States Attorney for the District of the Virgin Islands
- In office April 23, 2018 – May 03, 2022
- President: Donald Trump; Joe Biden
- Preceded by: Ronald W. Sharpe
- Succeeded by: Delia L. Smith

United States Attorney for the Western District of North Carolina
- In office 2004–2009
- President: George W. Bush
- Preceded by: Robert J. Conrad
- Succeeded by: Anne Tompkins

Personal details
- Born: United States
- Party: Republican
- Education: Duke University; Washington and Lee Law School

Gretchen C. F. Shappert is an attorney. She served as the United States Attorney for the Western District of North Carolina from 2004 to 2009 and the United States Attorney for the District of the Virgin Islands from 2018 to 2022.

== Education and legal career ==
Shappert passed the North Carolina bar in 1980. She graduated from Duke University in 1977, and from Washington and Lee Law School. She was in private practice and was an assistant district attorney and an assistant public defender in Charlotte before becoming a federal prosecutor.

Shappert stressed tough prosecution of drug offenders while in office. Shappert also served as chair of the Justice Department's subcommittee on Native American issues. Shappert also opposed retroactively lessening prison sentences related to crack-cocaine.

Shappert resigned as U.S. Attorney for the Western District of North Carolina in March 2009. In addition to prosecuting serious drug offenses, Shappert is also keenly interested in anti-terrorism efforts. Shappert published an article about Attorney General Amos Akerman's leadership in prosecuting the Ku Klux Klan immediately after the civil war in what Shappert describes as "the worst outbreak of domestic violence in American history to date."

Shappert became the court-appointed U.S. Attorney for the Virgin Islands on April 23, 2018. On February 8, 2021, she along with 55 other Trump-era attorneys, were asked to resign.

Legal offices
Preceded by Robert J. Conrad	United States Attorney for the Western District of North Carolina; 2004–2009	Succeeded by Anne Tompkins
