= R. Andrew Murray =

American attorney

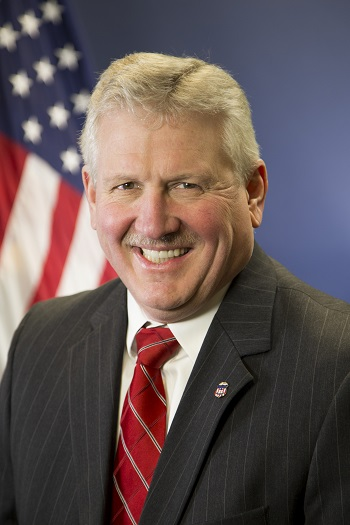

District Attorney for North Carolina Prosecutorial District 42
- Incumbent
- Assumed office May 3, 2021
- Preceded by: Greg Newman

United States Attorney for the Western District of North Carolina
- In office November 27, 2017 – February 28, 2021
- President: Donald Trump; Joe Biden
- Preceded by: Anne Tompkins
- Succeeded by: Dena J. King

Personal details
- Party: Republican
- Education: University of North Carolina at Charlotte; University of North Carolina School of Law

R. Andrew Murray is an American attorney who is the district attorney for North Carolina Prosecutorial District 42. He previously served as the United States Attorney for the United States District Court for the Western District of North Carolina from 2017 to 2021 and Mecklenburg County District Attorney.

== Early life ==
Murray earned a Bachelor of Arts in political science and hovernment from the University of North Carolina at Charlotte and a Juris Doctor from the University of North Carolina School of Law. He enlisted in the United States Coast Guard in 1980 and was later commissioned as an officer in the United States Coast Guard Reserve. In 2016, he retired as a captain after 35 years of service.

== Mecklenburg County ==
After serving as a managing partner in a private law firm and an assistant district attorney in Mecklenburg County, Murray was elected district attorney of Mecklenburg County in 2010. He served as DA from 2011 until 2017, when he was appointed U.S. Attorney.

== United States Attorney ==
Murray was recommended for the position of U.S. Attorney by Richard Burr and Thom Tillis, the U.S. senators from North Carolina. As a U.S. Attorney, Murray runs an office that prosecutes criminal and civil cases in an area covering 32 counties and 2.9 million people.

On November 9, 2017, he was confirmed to be the United States Attorney for the United States District Court for the Western District of North Carolina. He was sworn in on November 27, 2017. On February 8, 2021, he along with 55 other Trump-era attorneys were asked to resign. On February 16, he announced his resignation, effective February 28.

== District 42 ==
In May 2021, Murray was appointed acting district attorney for Prosecutorial District 42 by Governor Roy Cooper. He succeeded Greg Newman, who was removed from office by Judge Robert C. Ervin. He was elected to a full term in 2022.
