= Swann v. Charlotte-Mecklenburg Board of Education =

- Supreme Court of the United States

Argued October 12, 1970 Decided April 20, 1971
- Full case name: Swann et al. v. Charlotte-Mecklenburg Board of Education et al.
- Citations: 402 U.S. 1 (more) 91 S. Ct. 1267; 28 L. Ed. 2d 554; 1971 U.S. LEXIS 52

Case history
- Subsequent: 431 F.2d 138 (4th Cir. 1970), affirmed as to those parts in which it affirmed the District Court's judgment.

Holding
- Busing students to promote integration is constitutional.

Court membership
- Chief Justice Warren E. Burger Associate Justices Hugo Black · William O. Douglas; John M. Harlan II · William J. Brennan Jr. Potter Stewart · Byron White; Thurgood Marshall · Harry Blackmun

Case opinion
- Majority: Burger, joined by unanimous

Swann v. Charlotte-Mecklenburg Board of Education, 402 U.S. 1 (1971), was a landmark United States Supreme Court case dealing with the busing of students to promote integration in public schools. The Court held that busing was an appropriate remedy for the problem of racial imbalance in schools. This was done to ensure the schools would be "properly" integrated and that all students would receive equal educational opportunities regardless of their race.

Judge John J. Parker of the U.S. Court of Appeals for the Fourth Circuit interpreted the Brown v. Board of Education case as a charge not to segregate rather than an order to integrate. In 1963, the Court ruled in McNeese v. Board of Education and Goss v. Board of Education in favor of integration, and showed impatience with efforts to end segregation. In 1968 the Warren Court ruled in Green v. County School Board that freedom of choice plans were insufficient to eliminate segregation; thus, it was necessary to take proactive steps to integrate schools. In United States v. Montgomery County Board of Education (1969), Judge Frank Minis Johnson's desegregation order for teachers was upheld, allowing an approximate ratio of the races to be established by a district judge.

== Background ==
=== Historical background ===
North Carolina was one of the more moderate Southern states, and its resistance to integration was much weaker than in most other areas of the South. After Brown, it had ended segregation with a school assignment plan based on neighborhoods that was approved by the Court. However, when Charlotte consolidated school districts from the city itself with a surrounding area totaling 550 square miles (1,400 km^{2}), the majority of black students (who lived in central Charlotte) still attended mostly black schools as compared with majority white schools further outside the city.

=== Legal background ===
The desegregation order in Swann was an equitable remedy, and the Supreme Court determined its scope according to traditional principles of equity. Although equitable powers do not derive from § 1983, the statute supplied the necessary cause of action against state officials. William Van Alstyne commented that "the manner in which the statutory authorization to provide equitable relief was construed in Swann was felt by many to go to the very verge of judicial discretion".

== Legal proceedings ==
The NAACP Legal Defense Fund brought the Swann case on behalf of six-year-old James Swann and nine other families, with Julius L. Chambers presenting the case. Swann was chosen because his father was a theology professor, and was thus unlikely to be economically burdened by local retaliation.

In 1965, Judge J. Braxton Craven decided Swann v. Charlotte-Mecklenburg Board of Education in favor of Charlotte-Mecklenburg, because there was no requirement in the Constitution to act purposely to increase racial mixing.

After the Green ruling, the Swann case was filed again, and this time taken by Judge James Bryan McMillan as his first important case on the federal bench. McMillan had at one point been a public opponent of busing to integrate schools, but when the case was presented to him he said that the facts outweighed his feelings, and busing was the only way to fulfill the constitutional requirement of desegregation.

Experts from Rhode Island College were brought in for the Plaintiff's side to judge the effectiveness of the school board's new plan. From April to November 1969, McMillan repeatedly ordered the board to revise the plan. The Board eventually submitted a plan rezoning neighborhoods into pie-shaped wedges, where blacks living in the center of Charlotte would be divided up and distributed to outlying, formerly white high schools. The school board's plan required busing and would achieve a black population of 2–36% in all ten of the high schools. Due to the greater number of elementary schools, elaborate gerrymandering was required and would achieve greater integration, but would leave more than half of black elementary students at majority-black schools.

The Court rejected the Board's plan in favor of outsider Dr. John Finger's plan. The Finger Plan required busing of an additional 300 black students, established "satellite zones" and required pairing and grouping techniques to achieve even greater integration. As a consequence, McMillan became a local pariah. Chambers' home, office and car were bombed when he first took up the case.

When the case was appealed to the U.S. Court of Appeals for the Fourth Circuit, the case was heard en banc by six of the seven judges sitting on the court. The seventh judge Judge J. Braxton Craven, recused himself due to him being the original trial court judge. The opinion was 3–2–1 that the restructured busing orders should be affirmed for older students, but that it be remanded for those of elementary school age. Two dissenters would have affirmed the whole decision, while one would reverse McMillan's ruling in its entirety. McMillan decided to follow his original plan for elementary school students after the case was remanded to him.

== Swann before the Supreme Court ==
Justice William O. Douglas had previously been strongly opposed to busing. The Court was urged to begin their term early to hear the case, but decided to wait until the first day of their new term to begin.

Despite his relative youth and inexperience, Julius Chambers argued the case, because of his intimate knowledge of the facts involved. Erwin Griswold, the Solicitor General of the United States, represented the federal government, advocating Nixon's "go-slow" policy. Though no official vote was taken, Chief Justice Warren Burger and Justice Hugo Black wanted to reverse McMillan's order, while Justices Douglas, John Marshall Harlan II, William J. Brennan Jr., and Thurgood Marshall wanted a strong affirmation of the order; Justices Potter Stewart, Byron White, and Harry Blackmun did not express a strong feeling either way. Douglas, Brennan, and Marshall were quite liberal, but Harlan was usually conservative. When Burger circulated his very grudging affirmation of McMillan that limited future action and action in other areas by the Court, he met strong resistance. Douglas, Harlan, Brennan, and Marshall all demanded revisions and circulated suggestions for alternate drafts. Justice Stewart also reacted strongly after carefully considering the facts of the case, and wrote a "dissent" that would have been the opinion of the court without revisions of Burger's drafts.

Burger revised the opinion five times, each time making a stronger affirmation of McMillan and incorporating the language of Harlan, Brennan, Stewart, and others into it. After the fifth draft, Justice Black threatened a dissent if the opinion was made any stronger an affirmation, and so a sixth and final draft was created that was close to what Justice Stewart had composed after the first conference. The final opinion was 9–0 affirming McMillan's order.

The decision led to the widespread use of busing to end segregation by federal judges in the South.

== Timeline of the case being overturned ==
When the courts mandated that busing should occur to desegregate the schools, they also noted that one day when the school system was thought to be unitary, busing would end and the school board would be able to come up with a new plan which would best suit the education of students in Charlotte-Mecklenburg.

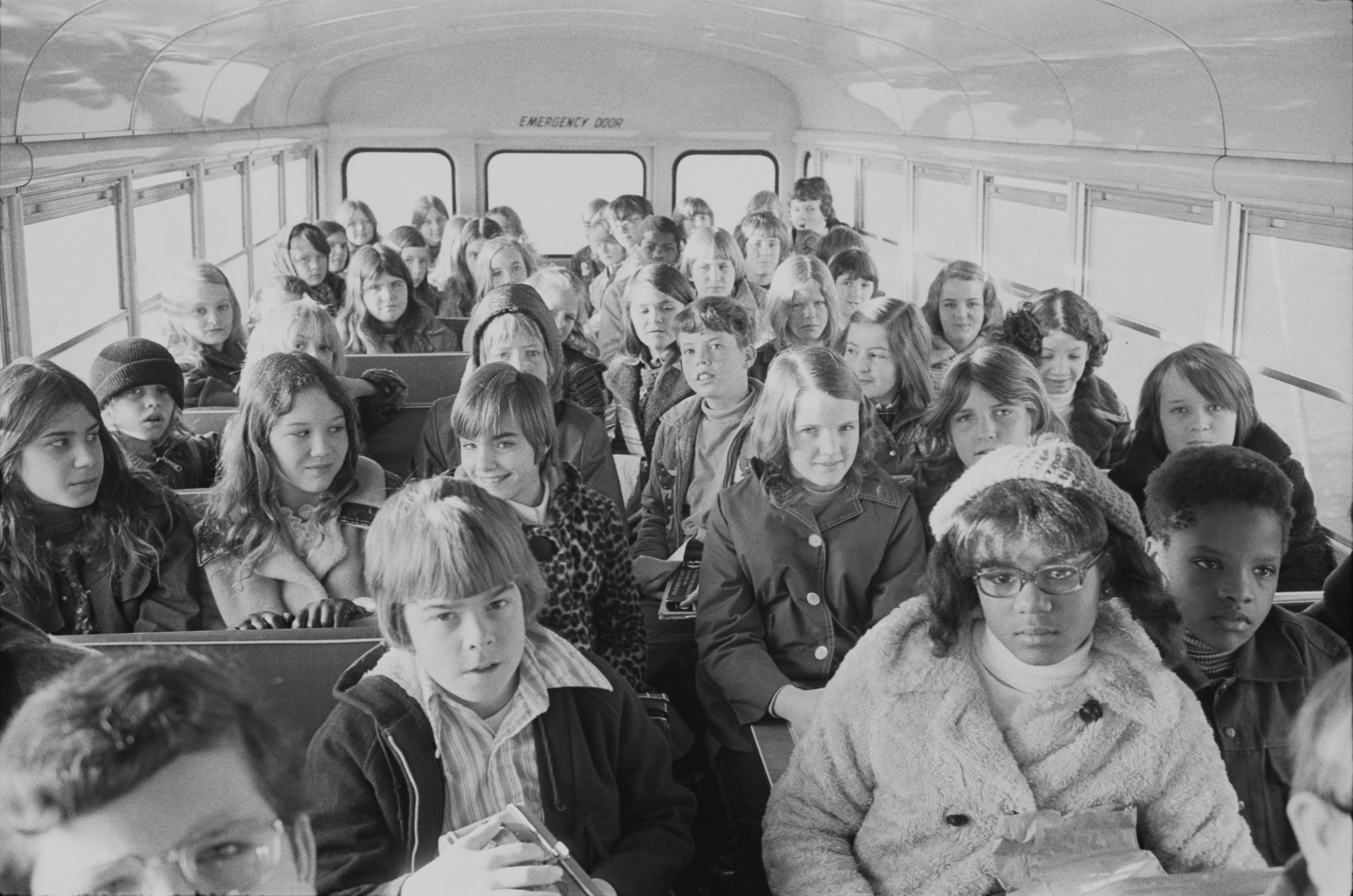
Integrated busing in Charlotte in 1973

After busing was enforced in 1971, throughout the 1970s and the 1980s, Charlotte was known across the nation as the "city that made desegregation work." It paved the way for many different school systems to use the busing plan to force integration in the school systems.

However, due to the booming economy of the city in the late 1980s and early 1990s, Charlotte experienced a rapid immigration from the Northeast and the Midwest, which resulted in a decline of the acceptance of busing. In 1992, in response to these complaints, CMS created a managed choice plan to reduce the number of students being bused. This new choice plan revolved around magnet schools, making one-third of the schools in Charlotte-Mecklenburg either magnets or partial magnets, and each magnet had a quota of black and white students that were allowed to attend. But this didn't please many white families who were denied entrance into magnet schools that had fulfilled their quotas.

In 1997, a parent, William Capacchione, sued the school system when his daughter was denied entrance into a magnet school for the second time based on her race. While the school system opposed the end of busing, Judge Robert D. Potter declared the mandate of a unitary system had been met and lifted the court order on mandatory busing by race or ethnicity. This ruling was upheld by the appeals court in Richmond, Virginia in 2000, and after the final appeal was declined to be heard by the U.S. Supreme Court, federal order of busing was ended in Charlotte-Mecklenburg, leaving decisions about how to redo the assignment policy for school attendance in the hands of the city school board.

The new assignment policy which was adopted in the fall of 2002 was known as the "School Choice Plan." This new choice plan divided the city into four large attendance zones based on neighborhoods. Students were allowed to choose to stay at their neighborhood "home school," or they could rank their top three choices of any other school in CMS; however they would only receive free transportation to their home school or any of the magnet schools in the district. If families chose their home school as their first choice, they were guaranteed that school; otherwise they were entered into a lottery that gave available spaces in overenrolled schools. If people did not choose a school, they were immediately placed into their home school. After creating a variety of programs to inform families about the new plan, over 95% of the families in the Charlotte-Mecklenburg school system submitted choices for the new school year.

The adoption of the 2002 School Choice Plan increased racial inequality despite the Charlotte-Mecklenburg School system's efforts to mitigate the effects of segregation through compensatory resource allocation.

== Subsequent developments ==
In 1977 the Supreme Court said in Dayton Board of Education v. Brinkman that the equitable power of federal courts to restructure the operation of local school boards is "not plenary" and may be exercised "only on the basis of a constitutional violation". Quoting post-Brown cases like Swann v. Charlotte-Mecklenburg and Milliken v. Bradley, the Court ruled that federal courts finding a violation of constitutional significance may apply the Swann standard—"the scope of the remedy is determined by the nature and extent of the constitutional violation"—to design a remedy that redresses the difference between the incremental effect of discriminatory violations on school demographics and "what it would have been in the absence of such constitutional violations".

== See also ==
- List of United States Supreme Court cases, volume 402
