= Anne Tompkins =

American attorney

Anne M. Tompkins
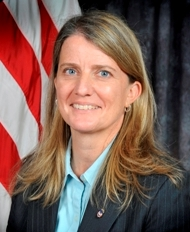

United States Attorney for the Western District of North Carolina
- In office April 2010 – October 2015
- Appointed by: Barack Obama
- Preceded by: Gretchen C.F. Shappert
- Succeeded by: R. Andrew Murray

Personal details
- Born: 1962 (age 63–64) Waynesboro, Virginia, U.S.
- Education: University of North Carolina at Charlotte (B.A.); University of North Carolina at Chapel Hill (M.P.A./J.D.)

Anne Magee Tompkins (born 1962) is an American lawyer who served as the United States Attorney for the United States District Court for the Western District of North Carolina.

== Early life and education ==
Born in Waynesboro, Virginia, Tompkins attended Central Piedmont Community College and the University of North Carolina at Charlotte where she earned a Bachelor of Arts degree in political science. She then went to the University of North Carolina at Chapel Hill, where she was awarded a Master in Public Administration and a Juris Doctor.

== Career ==
Tompkins joined the Mecklenburg County District Attorney's office in 1992 as an Assistant D.A., staying for five years until April 1997. After a brief interlude in private practice in Charlotte, she returned to the Mecklenburg County D.A.'s office just six months after leaving. In May 2000, she left the D.A.'s office to become an Assistant U.S. Attorney in the Western District of North Carolina, serving for five years. While working as an Assistant U.S. Attorney, she was detailed to Baghdad for eight months to help prosecute Saddam Hussein.

In August 2005, Tompkins joined Alston & Bird, a Charlotte law practice, as a partner. There, she specialized in white collar criminal defense and corporate compliance.

On December 23, 2009, Tompkins was nominated by President Barack Obama to serve as U.S. Attorney for the Western District of North Carolina. The Senate Judiciary Committee approved her nomination unanimously on March 25, 2010; she gained unanimous approval from the full Senate on April 22.

On March 18, 2011, Tompkins attracted controversy when she described a man's minting of his own currency as "a unique form of domestic terrorism" that is trying "to undermine the legitimate currency of this country." The comment related to the successful conviction of Bernard von NotHaus, who was found guilty of creating and distributing a counterfeit currency. The Justice Department press release on the matter quotes her as saying: “While these forms of anti-government activities do not involve violence, they are every bit as insidious and represent a clear and present danger to the economic stability of this country". Tompkins pushed for the maximum 22-year sentence, but a U.S. district court judge sentenced him to three years probation, plus six months in house arrest. Her efforts here even earned mention in The New York Sun for A ‘Unique’ Form of ‘Terrorism'.

== Personal life ==
In her time as a United States Attorney, Tompkins "engaged in extensive outreach to the LGBT, Arab-Muslim and Sikh communities, and has met with leaders of numerous faith-based organizations." She was also active in helping transform the culture of Charlotte-Mecklenburg Schools (CMS) through Project "Engage!" where Charlotte schools’ decision to explore the experiences of LGBT youth were noteworthy, At the time of her appointment she was one of four openly LGBT U.S. Attorneys, alongside Jenny Durkan of the Western District of Washington, Laura Duffy of the Southern District of California and Robert L. Pitman of the Western District of Texas.

Legal offices
Preceded by Gretchen C.F. Shappert	United States Attorney for the Western District of North Carolina; 2010–2015	Succeeded by R. Andrew Murray
