= 1957 Georgia Memorial to Congress =

The 1957 Georgia Memorial to Congress was a joint resolution by the legislature of the state of Georgia, and approved by Georgia Governor Marvin Griffin on March 8, 1957, urging the Congress of the United States to declare the 14th and 15th Amendments null and void because of purported violations of the Constitution during the post-Civil War ratification process.

== Historical context ==
The Memorial, part of Georgia's "continuing battle for segregation," followed the Supreme Court's ruling, in Brown v. Board of Education, that the Fourteenth Amendment prohibits states from discriminating against racial minorities in public schools.

=== Numeration of contentions ===
The Georgia resolution is a petition in the form of a memorial. The Resolution makes certain contentions, including the following:

- That the State of Georgia and ten other Southern States meet the conditions laid down by the President for the resumption of practical relations, and elected Senators and Representatives to the 19th Congress [possible typographical error that should have read "39th Congress"].
- That when the southern Senators and Representatives appeared in the Capitol to take their seats, "hostile majorities" in both houses of Congress refused to admit them;
- That the affected Congresses were, constitutionally, nothing more than "private assemblages unlawfully attempting to exercise legislative power";
- That the 19th [i.e., 39th] Congress was without lawful power to propose any constitutional amendments;
- That two-thirds of the members of each house failed to vote for the submission of the 14th and 15th amendments;
- That all subsequent proceedings were null and void;
- That the proposals were rejected by the State of Georgia and twelve other southern states, as well as some northern states, but that subsequent Congresses illegally dissolved the governments in Georgia and nine other southern states by military force, and that puppet governments "compliantly ratified the invalid proposals";
- That the pretended ratification of the 14th and 15th amendments was necessary "to give color to the claim [ . . . ] that these so-called amendments had been ratified by three-fourths of the states";
- That the mere lapse of time does not confirm an invalidly-enacted provision;
- That the continued recognition of the 14th and 15th amendments "is incompatible with the present day position of the United States as the World's champion of Constitutional governments resting upon the consent of the people given through their lawful representatives".

=== Reaction ===
The events described in the memorial were the subject of an editorial in a 1957 U.S. News & World Report.

== See also ==
- Southern Manifesto
