= Samuel James Ervin III =

American judge (1926–1999)

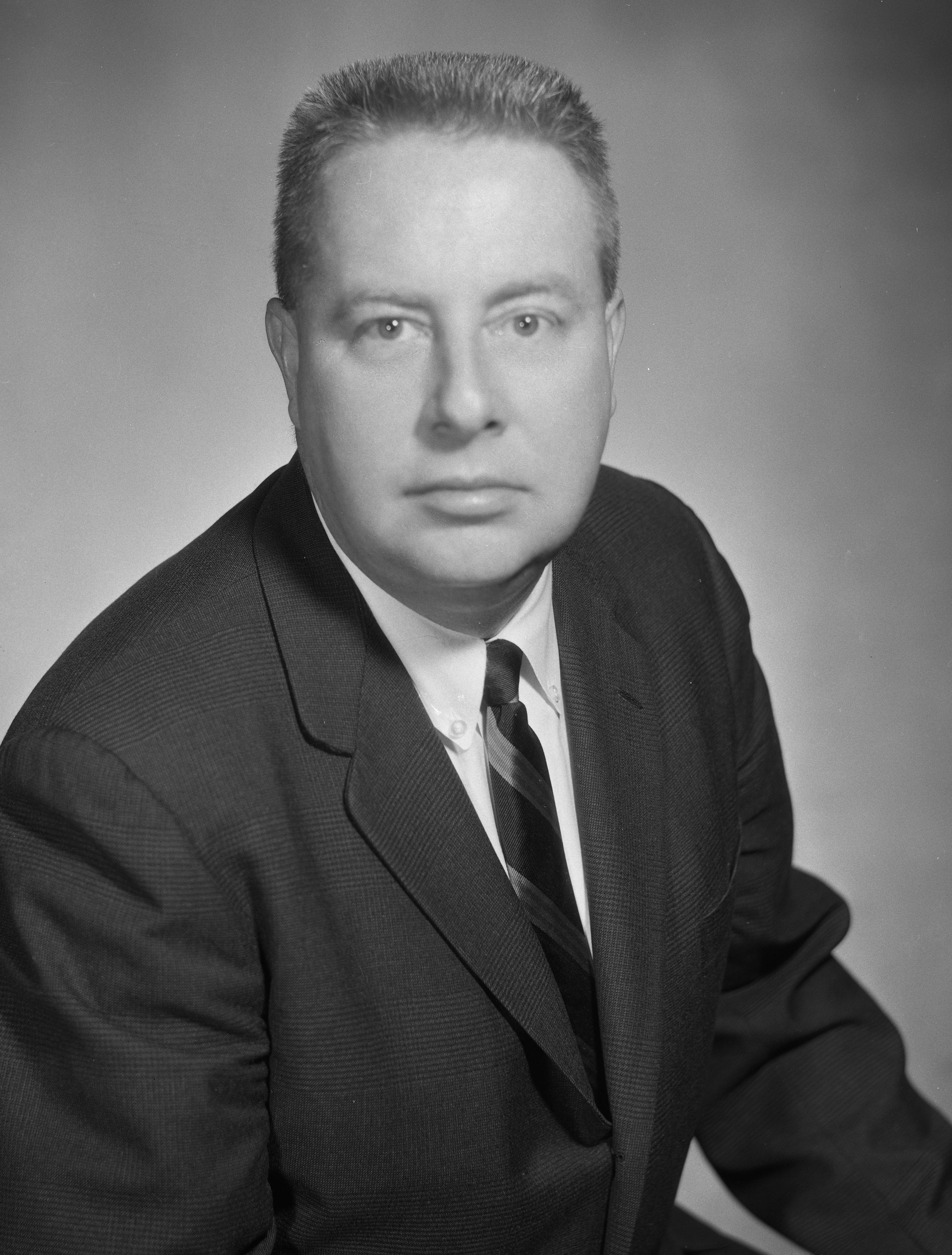
- Ervin c. 1967

Chief Judge of the United States Court of Appeals for the Fourth Circuit
- In office 1989–1996
- Preceded by: Harrison Lee Winter
- Succeeded by: J. Harvie Wilkinson III

Judge of the United States Court of Appeals for the Fourth Circuit
- In office May 23, 1980 – September 18, 1999
- Appointed by: Jimmy Carter
- Preceded by: Seat established by 92 Stat. 1629
- Succeeded by: Allyson K. Duncan

Personal details
- Born: March 2, 1926 Morganton, North Carolina, U.S.
- Died: September 18, 1999 (aged 73) Morganton, North Carolina, U.S.
- Spouse: Elisabeth "Betty" Crawford (m. 1952)
- Children: Sam, Robert
- Parent: Sam Ervin (father)
- Education: Davidson College (BS); Harvard Law School (LLB)

Samuel James Ervin III (March 2, 1926 – September 18, 1999) was a United States circuit judge of the United States Court of Appeals for the Fourth Circuit and the son of United States Senator Sam Ervin.

== Education and career ==
Ervin was born in Morganton, North Carolina. He received a Bachelor of Science from Davidson College in 1948 and a Bachelor of Laws from Harvard Law School in 1951. He served in the United States Army from 1944 to 1946 and from 1951 to 1952. He was in private practice of law in Morganton from 1952 to 1967. He was the solicitor for the Burke County, North Carolina Board of Commissioners, from 1954 to 1956. He was a Member of the North Carolina House of Representatives from 1965 to 1967. He was a judge of the Superior Court of North Carolina from 1967 to 1980.

== Federal judicial service ==
Ervin was nominated by President Jimmy Carter on April 2, 1980, to the United States Court of Appeals for the Fourth Circuit, to a new seat created by 92 Stat. 1629. He was confirmed by the United States Senate on May 21, 1980, and received his commission on May 23, 1980. Ervin served as Chief Judge of the court from 1989 to 1996. He served on the court until his death on September 18, 1999, in Morganton. Among others, he was survived by his sons, Sam J. Ervin IV and Robert C. Ervin, both of whom became judges.

== Sources ==
Legal offices
| Preceded by Seat established by 92 Stat. 1629 | Judge of the United States Court of Appeals for the Fourth Circuit; 1980–1999 | Succeeded by Allyson K. Duncan |
| Preceded by Harrison Lee Winter | Chief Judge of the United States Court of Appeals for the Fourth Circuit; 1989–1996 | Succeeded by J. Harvie Wilkinson III |
