= Southern Manifesto =

Document in opposition to racial integration in public places

Declaration of Constitutional Principles
- School segregation in the United States by state prior to Brown v. Board of Education (1954)
- Date published: March 12, 1956
- Primary authors: Strom Thurmond Richard Russell Jr. Sam Ervin
- Signatories: 101 politicians (19 Senators, 82 Representatives)
- Core purpose: Resistance to public school integration following Brown v. Board of Education
- Country: United States
- Ideologies: Segregationism States' rights

The Declaration of Constitutional Principles (known informally as the Southern Manifesto) was a document written in February and March 1956, during the 84th United States Congress, in opposition to racial integration of public places. The manifesto was signed by 19 US senators and 82 representatives from the Southern United States. The signatories included the entire congressional delegations from Alabama, Arkansas, Georgia, Louisiana, Mississippi, South Carolina, and Virginia, most of the members from Florida and North Carolina, and several members from Tennessee and Texas. All of them were from the former Confederate states. 97 were Democrats; 4 were Republicans.

The Manifesto was drafted to support reversing the landmark Supreme Court 1954 ruling Brown v. Board of Education, which determined that segregation of public schools was unconstitutional. School segregation laws were some of the most enduring and best-known of the Jim Crow laws that characterized the South at the time.

"Massive resistance" to federal court orders requiring school integration was already being practiced across the South, and was not caused by the Manifesto. Senator J. William Fulbright of Arkansas had worked behind the scenes to tone down the original harsh draft. The final version did not pledge to nullify the Brown decision, nor did it support extralegal resistance to desegregation. Instead, it was mostly a states' rights attack against the judicial branch for overstepping its role.

The Southern Manifesto accused the Supreme Court of "clear abuse of judicial power" and promised to use "all lawful means to bring about a reversal of this decision which is contrary to the Constitution and to prevent the use of force in its implementation". It suggested that the Tenth Amendment should limit the reach of the Supreme Court on such issues. Senators in the Southern Caucus led the opposition, with Strom Thurmond writing the initial draft and Richard Russell the final version.

Three Democratic senators from the former Confederate states did not sign:

- Al Gore Sr. and Estes Kefauver of Tennessee
- Senate Majority Leader Lyndon Johnson of Texas

The following Democratic representatives from the former Confederate states also did not sign:

- 16 of 21 Democrats from Texas, including Speaker of the House Sam Rayburn and future Speaker Jim Wright
- 1 of 7 Democrats from Tennessee (Percy Priest)
- 3 of 11 Democrats from North Carolina
- 1 of 7 Democrats from Florida (Dante Fascell)

Also, none of the 12 U.S. senators or 39 U.S. House representatives from the states of Delaware, Maryland, West Virginia, Kentucky, Missouri, and Oklahoma signed the Manifesto—despite all of these states requiring segregation in their public school systems prior to the Brown v. Board decision.

There were seven Republican representatives and three senators from former Confederate states. Only four signed the Manifesto: Charles Jonas of North Carolina, William Cramer of Florida, and Joel Broyhill and Richard Poff of Virginia.

== Key quotes ==
- "The unwarranted decision of the Supreme Court in the public school cases is now bearing the fruit always produced when men substitute naked power for established law."
- "The original Constitution does not mention education. Neither does the 14th Amendment nor any other amendment. The debates preceding the submission of the 14th Amendment clearly show that there was no intent that it should affect the system of education maintained by the States."
- "This unwarranted exercise of power by the Court, contrary to the Constitution, is creating chaos and confusion in the States principally affected. It is destroying the amicable relations between the white and Negro races that have been created through 90 years of patient effort by the good people of both races. It has planted hatred and suspicion where there has been heretofore friendship and understanding."

== Signatories and non-signatories ==
In many southern states, signing was much more common than not signing, with signatories including the entire delegations from Alabama, Arkansas, Georgia, Louisiana, Mississippi, South Carolina, and Virginia. Those from southern states who refused to sign are noted below.

=== United States Senate (in state order) ===
Signatories	Non-signatories
John Sparkman (D-Alabama); Lister Hill (D-Alabama); J. William Fulbright (D-Arkansas); John L. McClellan (D-Arkansas); George A. Smathers (D-Florida); Spessard Holland (D-Florida); Walter F. George (D-Georgia); Richard B. Russell (D-Georgia); Allen J. Ellender (D-Louisiana); Russell B. Long (D-Louisiana); James O. Eastland (D-Mississippi); John Stennis (D-Mississippi); Samuel Ervin (D-North Carolina); W. Kerr Scott (D-North Carolina); Strom Thurmond (D-South Carolina); Olin D. Johnston (D-South Carolina); Price Daniel (D-Texas); Harry F. Byrd (D-Virginia); A. Willis Robertson (D-Virginia)	Allen Frear (D-Delaware); John J. Williams (R-Delaware); Alben Barkley (D-Kentucky); Earle Clements (D-Kentucky); James Glenn Beall (R-Maryland); John Marshall Butler (R-Maryland); Stuart Symington (D-Missouri); Thomas Hennings (D-Missouri); Robert Kerr (D-Oklahoma); Mike Monroney (D-Oklahoma); Albert Gore Sr. (D-Tennessee); Estes Kefauver (D-Tennessee); Lyndon B. Johnson (D-Texas); Harley M. Kilgore (D-West Virginia); Matthew Neely (D-West Virginia)

=== United States House of Representatives ===
Alabama
Signatories
George W. Andrews (D); Frank W. Boykin (D); Carl Elliott (D); George M. Grant (D); George Huddleston Jr. (D); Robert E. Jones Jr. (D); Albert Rains (D); Kenneth A. Roberts (D); Armistead Selden (D)
Arkansas
Signatories
Ezekiel C. Gathings (D); Oren Harris (D); Brooks Hays (D); Wilbur D. Mills (D); William F. Norrell (D); James William Trimble (D)
Florida
Signatories	Non-signatories
Charles Edward Bennett (D); William C. Cramer (R); James A. Haley (D); Syd Herlong (D); D.R. "Billy" Matthews (D); Paul G. Rogers (D); Bob Sikes (D)	Dante Fascell (D)
Georgia
Signatories
Iris F. Blitch (D); Paul Brown (D); James C. Davis (D); John James Flynt Jr. (D); Tic Forrester (D); Phil M. Landrum (D); Henderson Lanham (D); J. L. Pilcher (D); Prince H. Preston (D); Carl Vinson (D)
Louisiana
Signatories
Hale Boggs (D); Overton Brooks (D); F. Edward Hebert (D); George S. Long (D); James H. Morrison (D); Otto E. Passman (D); T. Ashton Thompson (D); Edwin E. Willis (D)
Mississippi
Signatories
Thomas G. Abernethy (D); William M. Colmer (D); Frank E. Smith (D); Jamie L. Whitten (D); John Bell Williams (D); Arthur Winstead (D)
North Carolina
Signatories	Non-signatories
Hugh Q. Alexander (D); Graham A. Barden (D); Herbert C. Bonner (D); Frank Carlyle (D); Carl Durham (D); Lawrence Fountain (D); Charles R. Jonas (R); Woodrow W. Jones (D); George A. Shuford (D)	R. Thurmond Chatham (D); Harold D. Cooley (D); Charles B. Deane (D)
South Carolina
Signatories
Robert T. Ashmore (D); W.J. Bryan Dorn (D); John L. McMillan (D); James P. Richards (D); John J. Riley (D); L. Mendel Rivers (D)
Tennessee
Signatories	Non-signatories
Ross Bass (D); Jere Cooper (D); Clifford Davis (D); Joe Evins (D); James B. Frazier Jr. (D); Tom J. Murray (D)	Howard Baker Sr. (R); Percy Priest (D); B. Carroll Reece (R)
Texas
Signatories	Non-signatories
Wright Patman (D); John Dowdy (D); Walter Rogers (D); O. C. Fisher (D); Martin Dies Jr. (D)	Jack Brooks (D); Brady Gentry (D); Sam Rayburn (D); Bruce Alger (R); Olin E. Teague (D); Albert Thomas (D); Clark W. Thompson (D); Homer Thornberry (D); William Poage (D); Jim Wright (D); Frank Ikard (D); John J. Bell (D); Joe Madison Kilgore (D); J. T. Rutherford (D); Omar Burleson (D); George H. Mahon (D); Paul Kilday (D)
Virginia
Signatories
Edward J. Robeson Jr. (D); Porter Hardy (D); J. Vaughan Gary (D); Watkins M. Abbitt (D); William M. Tuck (D); Richard Harding Poff (R); Burr Harrison (D); Howard W. Smith (D); William Pat Jennings (D); Joel T. Broyhill (R)

== See also ==
- American Civil Rights Movement
- Fourteenth Amendment to the United States Constitution
- Brown v. Board of Education
- 1957 Georgia Memorial to Congress
- Massive resistance
- Racial segregation in the United States
- Solid South
- Southern Democrats
- Conservative Democrat
- 84th United States Congress
- Full Text
