= Robert J. Conrad =

American judge (born 1958)

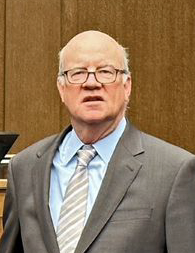

Director of the Administrative Office of the United States Courts
- Incumbent
- Assumed office March 1, 2024
- Appointed by: John Roberts
- Preceded by: Roslynn R. Mauskopf

Senior Judge of the United States District Court for the Western District of North Carolina
- In office May 17, 2023 – February 28, 2025

Chief Judge of the United States District Court for the Western District of North Carolina
- In office 2006–2013
- Preceded by: Graham Calder Mullen
- Succeeded by: Frank DeArmon Whitney

Judge of the United States District Court for the Western District of North Carolina
- In office June 2, 2005 – May 17, 2023
- Appointed by: George W. Bush
- Preceded by: Seat established by 116 Stat. 1758
- Succeeded by: Matthew Orso

Personal details
- Born: Robert James Conrad Jr. 1958 (age 67–68) Chicago, Illinois, U.S.
- Spouse: Ann
- Children: 5
- Education: Clemson University (BA); University of Virginia (JD)

Robert James "Bob" Conrad Jr. (born 1958) is a former United States district judge of the United States District Court for the Western District of North Carolina. He served as chief judge from 2006 to 2013 and was nominated to the United States Court of Appeals for the Fourth Circuit to take the place of the retired James Dickson Phillips Jr. He previously served as a member of the executive committee of the Judicial Conference of the United States from 2016 to 2020.

== Early life and education ==
Conrad was born in 1958, into an Irish-Catholic family in Chicago, Illinois. His family moved to Glen Ellyn, Illinois, in 1967; he graduated from Benet Academy High School in Lisle, Illinois in 1976.

Conrad graduated from Clemson University with a Bachelor of Arts degree in 1980. He received Clemson's coveted "Norris Medal" as the outstanding undergraduate student, as well as being awarded the Atlantic Coast Conference's Jim Weaver Scholarship as the ACC's top student-athlete.

He attended the University of Virginia School of Law, where he earned a Juris Doctor in 1983.

== Athletic career ==
Conrad was a Hall of Fame collegiate player at Clemson University. He was part of a Benet Academy High School basketball home court winning streak of over 100 consecutive games. In college, he was the point guard in 1980 for Clemson's basketball team. In 1980 he led his team in free throw percentage. He was most well known for making 8-8 free throws in overtime in Clemson's upset win against undefeated and No. 1 ranked Duke University.

Conrad was named a "Legend of the ACC", was listed as one of the 25 Best Players of the First 100 Years of Clemson Basketball, became an Academic All-American, and was the inaugural recipient of Clemson's "Bond" Ring as a Distinguished Athletic Alumnus.

== Legal career ==
Conrad's legal career has included stints with Michie Hamlett Donato & Lowry in Charlottesville, Virginia (1983–1986), Horn & Conrad (1986–1987), and Bush Thurman & Conrad (1987–1989). before becoming an Assistant United States Attorney (1989–2001) In 2001, he became the United States Attorney for the Western District of North Carolina (2001–2004). He was a partner with Mayer Brown (2004–2005) and became a federal district court judge in June 2005.

=== U.S. attorney ===
Conrad served as an assistant United States attorney for the Western District of North Carolina from 1989 to 2001.

In 1999, Attorney General Janet Reno selected him to serve as Chief of the Campaign Financing Task Force ("CFTF"), investigating alleged illegal campaign contributions to both parties during the 1996 Presidential election. In making the selection, AG Reno said "Bob is one of the most respected career prosecutors in the Department of Justice."

Conrad led a team of career prosecutors and obtained convictions against James Riady, Pauline Kanchanalak, Maria Hsia, among thirty others. In pleading guilty, Riady on behalf of Lippo Bank agreed to pay $8.6 million, "the largest fine ever imposed for violation of the campaign finance laws." As part of those duties Conrad deposed the President and vice-president of the United States in the same week. As Chief of the CFTF, he was later named Acting U.S. Attorney for New Jersey responsible for investigating and prosecuting alleged campaign financing violations related to the 1996 Torricelli for Senate Campaign.

Conrad was promoted to United States attorney in the same district from 2001 until 2004.

=== Federal judicial service ===
On February 14, 2005, President George W. Bush nominated Conrad to serve as a United States district judge of the United States District Court for the Western District of North Carolina, to a new seat authorized by 116 Stat. 1758. He was confirmed on April 28, 2005, and received his judicial commission on June 2, 2005. He became chief judge of the district in 2006 and served in that capacity until 2013. He assumed senior status on May 17, 2023. He retired from active service on February 28, 2025.

Conrad was appointed by Chief Justice Roberts to a position on the Judicial Conference of the United States. He chaired the District Court Representatives group of that Judicial Conference in 2020. From 2016 to 2020, he served on the executive committee of the Judicial Conference. He also chaired the COVID-19 Task Force on Reconstituting the Jury Trial.

While a judge on the bench of the Western District of North Carolina, Conrad was involved in the local and state bar serving as vice-president of the N.C. Bar Association (2011–12), member and Chair of the Memorials Committee of the Mecklenburg County Bar (2015–2021), and member of the Ayscue Professionalism Committee of that bar association (2019–2021).

On January 23, 2024, Chief Justice John Roberts named Conrad as the next director of the Administrative Office of the United States Courts, succeeding Judge Roslynn R. Mauskopf, effective March 1, 2024.

=== Noteworthy cases ===
- In April 2010, six alleged members of the gang MS-13 were tried before Conrad in two separate trials. The jury found the six defendants guilty on thirty six counts. In the second trial MS-13 gang member Alejandro Enrique Ramirez Umaña was charged with murder after he allegedly killed two brothers who "disrespected" him in a restaurant. A jury convicted Umaña of murder and voted unanimously to impose the death penalty.
- In September 2010, Conrad sat by designation on a panel of the Fourth Circuit that heard the appeal of Derek Tice, one of the "Norfolk Four" who had been convicted for a 1997 rape and murder. Following his conviction another man, Omar Ballard, confessed to committing the crime and had his DNA matched to the crime scene. The panel affirmed that Tice was entitled to a writ of habeas corpus and that his conviction should be overturned.
- In July 2011 Conrad presided over a trial involving a lawsuit against TASER International Inc. for the wrongful death of a minor. When 17-year-old Darryl Green was killed after being struck in the chest and shocked by a TASER product in a North Carolina supermarket in March 2008, the jury in the case found a $10 million judgment against the TASER company. Judge Conrad reduced the amount to $5.49 million in light of the "relatively thin" evidence and prior settlements in the case. The Fourth Circuit reduced that amount even further.
- In September 2011 Conrad issued an order prohibiting the US Airways pilots union from cancelling or delaying flights in their effort to force US Airways into contract negotiations.
- In 2014 Conrad expressed frustration at the mandatory minimum sentencing laws that required him to sentence Corvain Cooper, a 34-year-old black man, to life in prison for money laundering, tax evasion, and conspiracy to sell marijuana. Conrad stated at sentencing that he was "not comfortable with imposing a mandatory minimum life sentence on a 34-year-old individual without some discretion" to consider sentence-reducing factors, but stated that the law tied the Court's hands. Conrad had previously spoken out against such mandatory minimum sentence laws, testifying at a February 2009 Sentencing Commission Public Hearing that "ultimately the goal of uniformity must yield to the imperative of doing justice in individual cases." After President Barack Obama declined to issue a pardon in Cooper's case, President Donald Trump commuted Corvain Cooper's sentence in January 2021.

=== Failed nomination to the court of appeals ===
On July 17, 2007, Conrad was nominated by President George W. Bush to a seat on the United States Court of Appeals for the Fourth Circuit vacated by Judge James Dickson Phillips Jr. in 1994. Conrad was nominated in the place of the prior candidate Terrence Boyle.

Although he had the support of North Carolina's two Republican senators, Elizabeth Dole and Richard Burr, he ran into opposition from Senate Democrats, People for the American Way, and the Alliance for Justice. They expressed concerns over Conrad's writings prior to his confirmation as a district court judge and his rulings.

Conrad had referred to Planned Parenthood's OB/GYNs as "abortionists" in 1988. He also wrote that "Planned Parenthood knowingly kills unborn babies, not fetuses, as a method of post-conception contraception." Additionally, he claimed that Planned Parenthood had done nothing to reduce teen pregnancy rates and should not receive funding for its contraception services. In 1999, Conrad wrote "Habitually Wrong" which was published in the Catholic Dossier. In it, he heavily criticized Sister Helen Prejean's book Dead Man Walking. He referred to the book as "liberal drivel" and to Sister Prejean as a "Church-hating nun." He contended that, "This surprisingly shallow book wallows in worn-out liberal shibboleths and dated anecdotes."

Senator Patrick Leahy D-VT, the Democratic chairman of the Senate Judiciary Committee, used Conrad's writings to schedule a hearing. He said that Conrad was "anti-Catholic", to which Senate Republicans countered that Conrad, a Catholic, had merely criticized Prejean for "the near total contempt [she] displayed for the Roman Catholic Church."

Separately, People for the American Way argued that Conrad's short tenure on the district court had not served to put to rest the concerns raised by his pre-judicial record.

Supporters of Conrad responded by citing his life-long commitment to public service, the support of both home state Senators, his well-qualified ABA rating, and that the Senate had unanimously confirmed him twice before. His advocates also noted Attorney General Reno's commendation of Conrad as "one of the most respected career prosecutors in the Department of Justice."

Conrad's nomination lapsed with the end of the Bush administration. President Barack Obama chose to nominate James Andrew Wynn to the seat in 2009.

=== Academic career ===
In 2015, Conrad received the William J. Brennan Award from the National Trial Advocacy College.

Conrad is as an adjunct professor at Wake Forest School of Law, and taught trial advocacy at the National Advocacy Center in Columbia, SC.

Conrad authored several articles including "The Vanishing Criminal Jury Trial: From Trial Judges to Sentencing Judges," "Jury Trials in a Pandemic Age," and "Judging a Book: Conrad Reviews 'The Jury Crisis.'"

Conrad served on the Board of Trustees of Belmont Abbey College.

== Personal life ==
Conrad is Catholic. He and his wife Ann have five children and ten grandchildren.

== Book ==
In 2021, Conrad published John Fisher and Thomas More: Keeping Their Souls While Losing Their Heads (2021), recounting the stories of Bishop John Fisher and Thomas More, who were executed by King Henry VIII.

== See also ==
- George W. Bush judicial appointment controversies

Legal offices
Preceded by Seat established by 116 Stat. 1758	Judge of the United States District Court for the Western District of North Carolina; 2005–2023	Succeeded by Matthew Orso
Preceded by Graham Calder Mullen	Chief Judge of the United States District Court for the Western District of North Carolina; 2006–2013	Succeeded by Frank DeArmon Whitney
