= Basil Whitener =

American politician

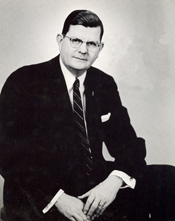

Member of the U.S. House of Representatives from North Carolina
- In office January 3, 1957 – January 3, 1969
- Preceded by: Woodrow W. Jones
- Succeeded by: Jim Broyhill
- Constituency: 11th district (1957–1963); 10th district (1963–1969)

Member of the North Carolina House of Representatives from Gaston County
- In office November 5, 1940 – November 3, 1942 Serving with Carl Rudisill
- Preceded by: R. Gregg Cherry
- Succeeded by: Stephen B. Dolley

Personal details
- Born: Basil Lee Whitener; May 14, 1915 York County, South Carolina, U.S.
- Died: March 20, 1989 (aged 73) Gastonia, North Carolina, U.S.
- Party: Democratic
- Education: Rutherford College; University of South Carolina; Duke University Law School
- Occupation: Lawyer; politician

Military service
- Branch/service: United States Navy
- Years of service: 1942–1945
- Rank: Lieutenant
- Battles/wars: World War II

Basil Lee Whitener (May 14, 1915 – March 20, 1989) was a Democratic U.S. Representative from North Carolina between 1957 and 1969.

Whitener was born in York County, South Carolina on May 14, 1915, and was educated in the public schools of Gaston County, North Carolina. He graduated from Lowell High School in 1931 and from Rutherford College in 1933, attending the University of South Carolina from 1933 to 1935 and graduating from Duke University Law School in 1937. He was admitted to the North Carolina bar in 1937 and commenced practice of law in Gastonia, North Carolina.

In 1940, Whitener was elected to the North Carolina House of Representatives and was renominated in 1942 but resigned to enter the United States Navy. He served as a gunnery officer until November 1945, leaving with a rank of lieutenant. Whitener was appointed solicitor, fourteenth solicitorial district, in January 1946 and elected in November 1946, reelected in 1950 and 1954, and served until December 31, 1956. In 1948, he was a delegate to the Democratic National Convention.

Whitener was elected as a Democrat to the Eighty-fifth and to the five succeeding Congresses (January 3, 1957 – January 3, 1969); he was an unsuccessful candidate for reelection in 1968 to the Ninety-first Congress and an unsuccessful candidate for election in 1970 to the Ninety-second Congress. He resumed the practice of law.

In 1966, Whitener unsuccessfully introduced an amendment to a bill to make Title VI of the Civil Rights Act of 1964 inoperative.

During an address in 1966, Whitener spoke highly of the record of the Democratic Party since 1930 in delivering reforms of benefit to the American people such as the minimum wage, social security, and rural electrification.

Whitener was a resident of Gastonia, North Carolina until his death there on March 20, 1989.

U.S. House of Representatives
Preceded by Woodrow W. Jones	Member of the U.S. House of Representatives from North Carolina's 11th congressional district January 3, 1957 – January 3, 1969	Succeeded by Roy A. Taylor
Preceded by Charles R. Jonas	Member of the U.S. House of Representatives from North Carolina's 10th congressional district January 3, 1963 – January 3, 1969	Succeeded by Jim Broyhill
