= James M. Baley Jr. =

American lawyer and judge (1912–2003)

James M. Baley Jr. (1912–2003) was an American lawyer and judge. A Republican, he served in the North Carolina House of Representatives, representing Madison County, in the General Assemblies of 1937-38 and 1939–40. He served as United States Attorney for the Western District of North Carolina under President Dwight D. Eisenhower from 1953 through 1961. Baley then returned to the practice of law at the firm that became McGuire, Wood & Bissette, until his appointment to the North Carolina Court of Appeals in 1973. After a brief stint on the Court of Appeals, he was appointed to a special superior court judgeship.

Baley also served as chairman of the North Carolina Republican Party from 1951 to 1953 and as a presidential elector for the Bush/Quayle ticket in 1988.

North Carolina House of Representatives
Preceded by J. Herschel Sprinkle	Member of the North Carolina House of Representatives from the Madison County district 1937–1941	Succeeded by James Henry Hutchins
Preceded by Thomas E. Uzzell	United States Attorney for the Western District of North Carolina; 1953–1961	Succeeded by Hugh E. Monteith
