= Alfred L. Bulwinkle =

American politician (1883–1950)

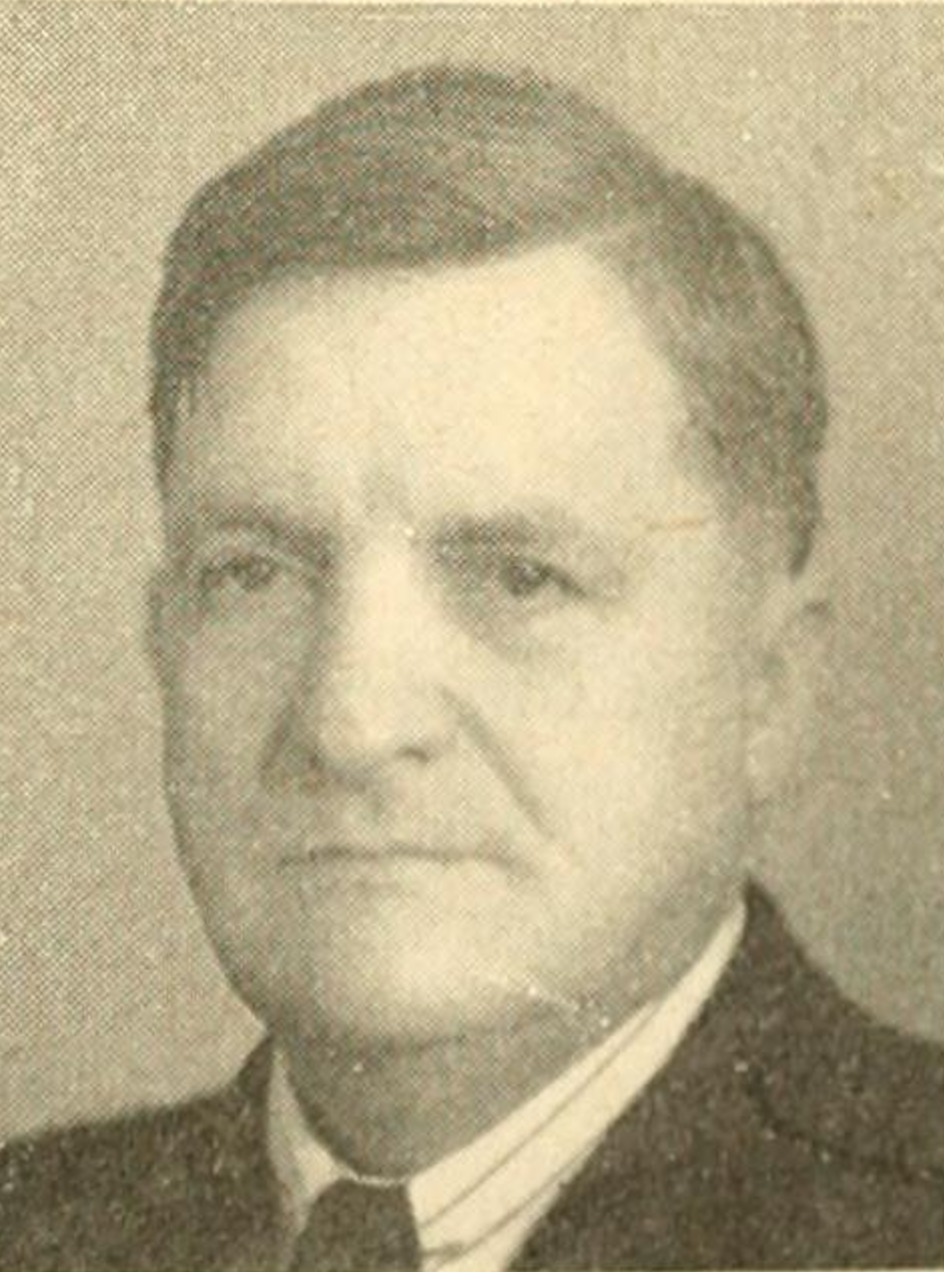

Member of the U.S. House of Representatives from North Carolina
- In office March 4, 1921 – March 3, 1929
- Preceded by: Clyde R. Hoey
- Succeeded by: Charles A. Jonas
- Constituency: 9th district
- In office March 4, 1931 – August 31, 1950
- Preceded by: Charles A. Jonas (9th); Zebulon Weaver (10th & 11th)
- Succeeded by: Robert L. Doughton (9th); Cameron Morrison (10th); Woodrow W. Jones (11th)
- Constituency: 9th district (1931-33); 10th district (1933-43); 11th district (1943-50)

Personal details
- Born: Alfred Lee Bulwinkle; April 21, 1883 Charleston, South Carolina, U.S.
- Died: August 31, 1950 (aged 67) Gastonia, North Carolina, U.S.
- Resting place: Oakwood Cemetery; 35°15′41″N 81°11′18″W
- Party: Democratic
- Education: University of North Carolina

Military service
- Allegiance: United States
- Branch/service: North Carolina National Guard
- Years of service: 1909–1917
- Rank: Major
- Unit: Second Battalion, One Hundred and Thirteenth Field Artillery, Fifty-fifth Brigade, Thirtieth Division, American Expeditionary Forces
- Battles/wars: World War I

Alfred Lee Bulwinkle (April 21, 1883 – August 31, 1950) was an American lawyer and politician who served 14 terms as a U.S. representative from North Carolina between 1921 and 1951.

== Early life ==
Born in Charleston, South Carolina, Bulwinkle moved with his parents to Dallas, North Carolina, in 1891. He attended the common schools. He studied law at the University of North Carolina at Chapel Hill. He was admitted to the bar in 1904 and commenced practice in Dallas, North Carolina. He served as prosecuting attorney for the municipal court of Gastonia from 1913 to 1916. He served as captain in Company B, First Infantry, North Carolina National Guard from 1909 to 1917. He served on the Mexican border in 1916 and 1917. During the First World War served as a major in command of the Second Battalion, One Hundred and Thirteenth Field Artillery, Fifty-fifth Brigade, Thirtieth Division, American Expeditionary Forces.

== Congress ==
Bulwinkle was elected as a Democrat to the Sixty-seventh and to the three succeeding Congresses (March 4, 1921 – March 3, 1929). He was an unsuccessful candidate for reelection in 1928 to the Seventy-first Congress, losing to Charles A. Jonas.

Two years later, Bulwinkle defeated Jonas and was elected to the Seventy-second Congress. He served in nine succeeding Congresses and served from March 4, 1931, until his death. He served as chairman of the Committee on Memorials (Seventy-sixth Congress). In 1938, he was key to passing the La Follette–Bulwinkle Act which sanctioned federal assistance to U.S. states establishing preventive healthcare for venereal diseases.

He served as delegate to the International Aviation Conference at Chicago, Illinois, in 1944. In 1947, he was the United States adviser, International Civil Aviation Organization at Montreal, Canada, and Geneva, Switzerland.

=== Death and burial ===
He died in Gastonia, North Carolina, August 31, 1950, of multiple myeloma. He was interred in Oakwood Cemetery.

== See also ==
- List of members of the United States Congress who died in office (1950–1999)

U.S. House of Representatives
| Preceded by Clyde R. Hoey | Member of the U.S. House of Representatives from North Carolina's 9th congressional district 1921–1929 | Succeeded by Charles A. Jonas |
| Preceded by Charles A. Jonas | Member of the U.S. House of Representatives from North Carolina's 9th congressional district 1931–1933 | Succeeded by Robert L. Doughton |
| Preceded by Zebulon Weaver | Member of the U.S. House of Representatives from North Carolina's 10th congressional district 1933–1943 | Succeeded by Cameron Morrison |
| Preceded by Zebulon Weaver | Member of the U.S. House of Representatives from North Carolina's 11th congressional district 1943–1950 | Succeeded by Woodrow W. Jones |
