= Mitchell N. Berman =

American legal scholar

- Occupation: Law professor
- Title: Leon Meltzer Professor of Law; Co-Director of the Institute for Law & Philosophy

Academic background
- Education: Harvard University (BA); University of Michigan (JD, MA)

Academic work
- Institutions: University of Pennsylvania

Mitchell N. Berman is an American legal scholar. He serves as the Leon Meltzer Professor of Law at the University of Pennsylvania Law School and, in addition, is also a professor of philosophy. He is also the co-director of the Institute for Law & Philosophy at the university.

== Biography ==
Berman attended Harvard University (A.B. 1988), the University of Michigan Law School (J.D. 1993), and the University of Michigan (M.A. 1994). In 1994 to 1995 he was a law clerk to Judge James Dickson Phillips Jr. of the U.S. Court of Appeals for the Fourth Circuit.

Berman is the Leon Meltzer Professor of Law at the University of Pennsylvania Law School, and Professor of Philosophy. He is also the Co-Director of the Institute for Law & Philosophy. Earlier in his career he was the University of Texas at Austin School of Law Richard Dale Endowed Chair in Law.

Among his many articles are "Our Principled Constitution," 166 U. PA. L. REV. 1325 (2018), "The Tragedy of Justice Scalia," 115 MICH. L. REV. 783 (2017), and "Judge Posner’s Simple Law," 113 MICH. L. REV. 777 (2015).
