= Matthew Orso =

American judge (born 1978)

Matthew Emile Orso

Judge of the United States District Court for the Western District of North Carolina
- Incumbent
- Assumed office December 12, 2025
- Appointed by: Donald Trump
- Preceded by: Robert J. Conrad

Personal details
- Born: 1978 (age 47–48) Highland, Illinois, U.S.
- Education: University of Dayton (BA); Saint Louis University (JD)

Matthew Emile Orso (born 1978) is an American lawyer who serves as a United States district judge of the United States District Court for the Western District of North Carolina.

== Early life and education ==
Orso was born in 1978 in Highland, Illinois. He received a Bachelor of Arts degree, cum laude, in 2001 from the University of Dayton, majoring in history. He received a Juris Doctor, magna cum laude, in 2009 from the Saint Louis University School of Law, where he served as editor in chief of the Saint Louis University Law Journal. He served as a law clerk for Judge Robert J. Conrad of the United States District Court for the Western District of North Carolina from 2009 to 2011.

== Career ==
From 2011 to 2012, Orso worked as an associate for Smith Parsons, PLLC in Charlotte. From 2012 to 2023, he worked as an associate and, from 2018, partner for McGuireWoods LLP in its Charlotte office. From 2023 to 2025, Orso was a partner with the law firm of Troutman Pepper Locke at its Charlotte office. He focused on regulatory law, administrative law,and white collar criminal defense, and he often advised clients who were subject to regulatory inquiry and prosecution.

=== Federal judicial service ===
On August 22, 2025, President Donald Trump announced his intention to nominate Orso to a seat on the United States District Court for the Western District of North Carolina vacated by Judge Robert J. Conrad. The nomination was transmitted to the United States Senate on September 15, 2025. On October 9, 2025, his nomination was favorably reported out of committee by a 14–8 vote. On December 3, the Senate invoked cloture on his nomination by a 56–40 vote. Later that day, his nomination was confirmed by a 57–41 vote. He received his judicial commission on December 12, 2025.

Legal offices
Preceded by Robert J. Conrad	Judge of the United States District Court for the Western District of North Carolina; 2025–present	Incumbent
