= Frank DeArmon Whitney =

American judge (born 1959)

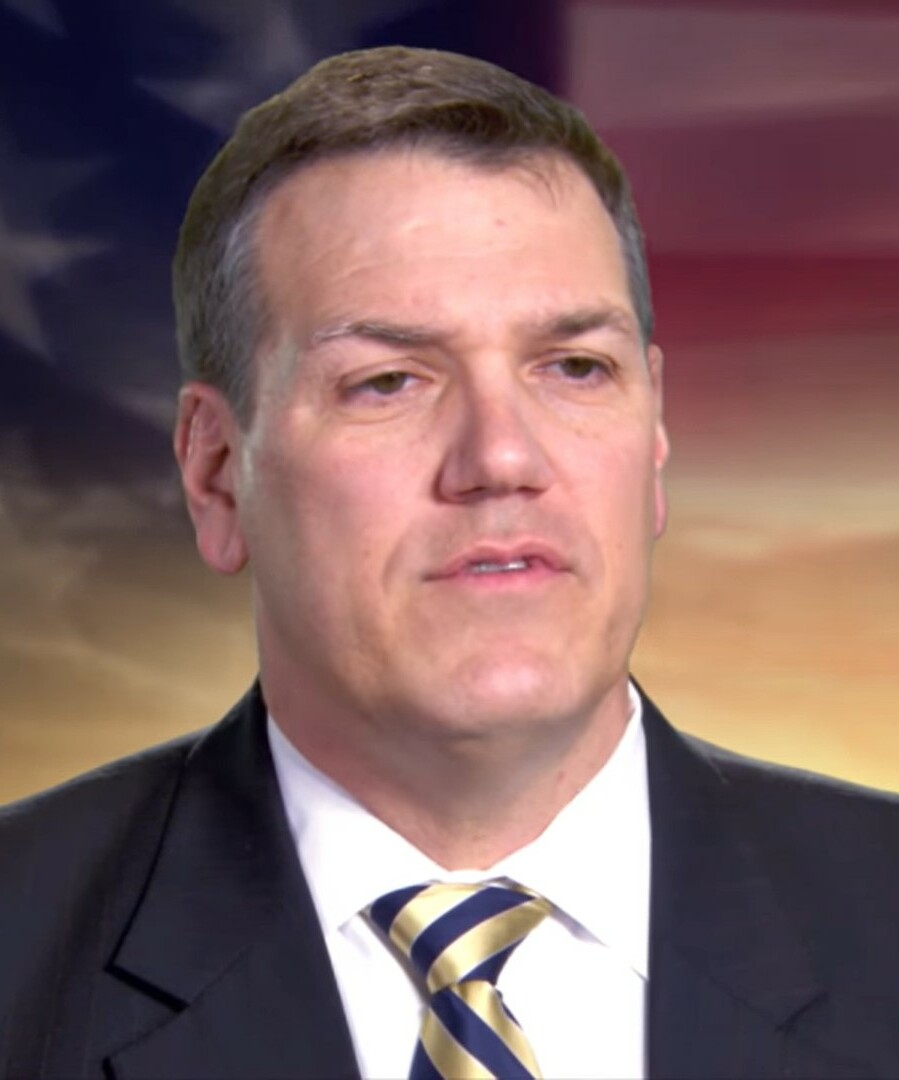
- Whitney in 2012

Senior Judge of the United States District Court for the Western District of North Carolina
- Incumbent
- Assumed office December 1, 2024

Chief Judge of the United States District Court for the Western District of North Carolina
- In office June 2, 2013 – June 2, 2020
- Preceded by: Robert J. Conrad
- Succeeded by: Martin Karl Reidinger

Judge of the United States District Court for the Western District of North Carolina
- In office July 5, 2006 – December 1, 2024
- Appointed by: George W. Bush
- Preceded by: Harold Brent McKnight
- Succeeded by: Susan C. Rodriguez

United States Attorney for the Eastern District of North Carolina
- In office April 2002 – July 2006
- Appointed by: George W. Bush
- Preceded by: Janice Cole
- Succeeded by: George Holding

Personal details
- Born: November 22, 1959 (age 66) Charlotte, North Carolina, U.S.
- Education: Wake Forest University (BA); University of North Carolina at Chapel Hill (JD, MBA)

Military service
- Allegiance: United States
- Branch/service: United States Army; United States Army Reserve
- Years of service: 1982–2012
- Rank: Colonel
- Unit: JAG Corps
- Battles/wars: Iraq War
- Awards: Meritorious Service Medal

For the 19th-century baseball player, see Frank Whitney (baseball).

Frank DeArmon Whitney (born November 22, 1959) is a senior United States district judge of the United States District Court for the Western District of North Carolina.

== Education and career ==
Whitney was born in Charlotte, North Carolina. He received a Bachelor of Arts degree from Wake Forest University in 1982 where he was a member of the ROTC program and inducted into Phi Beta Kappa society. He earned a joint Juris Doctor and Master of Business Administration degree from the University of North Carolina School of Law and the University of North Carolina at Chapel Hill, respectively, in 1987. He entered private practice in Washington, D.C., in 1987. From 1988-89 he was a law clerk for Judge David B. Sentelle of the United States Court of Appeals for the District of Columbia Circuit before returning to private practice from 1989 to 1990. He was an assistant United States attorney for the Western District of North Carolina from 1990 to 2001. He was in private practice in Charlotte from 2001 to 2002, and was then the United States Attorney for the Eastern District of North Carolina from 2002-06.

=== Federal judicial service ===
Whitney was nominated by President George W. Bush on February 14, 2006, to a seat on the United States District Court for the Western District of North Carolina vacated by Judge Harold Brent McKnight. Whitney was confirmed by the United States Senate on June 22, 2006, and received his commission on July 5, 2006. He served as chief judge from 2013 to 2020. He assumed senior status on December 1, 2024.

=== Military service ===
Whitney attended The JAG School at the University of Virginia. He served in the United States Army JAG Corps from 1982 to 2012. According to a JAG Corps historian, he is the first federal judge to serve as a military judge presiding over courts-martial in a combat theater. He also presided over the last court martial in Iraq before the complete withdrawal of U.S. troops from the country.

Legal offices
| Preceded by Harold Brent McKnight | Judge of the United States District Court for the Western District of North Carolina; 2006–2024 | Succeeded by Susan C. Rodriguez |
| Preceded by Robert J. Conrad | Chief Judge of the United States District Court for the Western District of North Carolina; 2013–2020 | Succeeded by Martin Karl Reidinger |
