= Harold Brent McKnight =

American judge (1952–2004)

Judge of the United States District Court for the Western District of North Carolina
- In office August 1, 2003 – November 27, 2004
- Appointed by: George W. Bush
- Preceded by: Seat established by 116 Stat. 1758
- Succeeded by: Frank DeArmon Whitney

Magistrate Judge of the United States District Court for the Western District of North Carolina
- In office 1993–2003

Personal details
- Born: Harold Brent McKnight; February 20, 1952 Mooresville, North Carolina, U.S.
- Died: November 27, 2004 (aged 52) Charlotte, North Carolina, U.S.
- Education: University of North Carolina at Chapel Hill (BA, JD); Magdalen College, Oxford University (MA)

Harold Brent McKnight (February 20, 1952 – November 27, 2004) was a United States district judge of the United States District Court for the Western District of North Carolina.

== Education and career ==
McKnight was born in Mooresville, North Carolina. He received a Bachelor of Arts degree from the University of North Carolina at Chapel Hill in 1974; a Master of Arts degree from Magdalen College, Oxford University in 1976 where he attended as a Rhodes Scholar; and a Juris Doctor from the University of North Carolina School of Law in 1980. While a student at UNC, he spent the summer of 1973 sifting through 1100 boxes of documents searching for information to aid the Senate Select Committee on Watergate. He was an assistant district attorney in North Carolina from 1982 to 1988, and a District judge in the 26th North Carolina Judicial District Court from 1989 to 1993. Judge McKnight was also a visiting lecturer at the University of North Carolina at Charlotte from 1992 to 2003, and an adjunct assistant professor at Wingate University from 1994 to 2003.

=== Federal judicial service ===
McKnight became a United States magistrate judge of the United States District Court for the Western District of North Carolina in 1993, serving in that capacity until 2003. He was nominated to the federal bench by President George W. Bush on April 28, 2003, to fill a new seat created by Congress. In his confirmation hearings, Judge McKnight explained his views on the role of a judge as follows: "If I am so fortunate as to be confirmed, it is my deep-seated belief, one that I've acted on in 14 years now as a judge, that the role of the judge is precisely to interpret the law as it is given to him or her, not to make law, not to expand beyond the law, not to play legislator, but to follow precedent, honestly, fairly, with integrity, to respect precedent that is established, to follow the statutes and give a precise and fair interpretation of the statutes, and do my best with what is given to me, to apply it to specific fact situations accurately and justly." He was confirmed by the United States Senate on July 31, 2003, and received his commission on August 1, 2003.

== Death and tributes ==
McKnight died from throat cancer on November 27, 2004, in Charlotte, North Carolina. Shortly after his death, the North Carolina Bar Association Professionalism Committee dedicated their publication, "Lawyer to Lawyer: North Carolina Reflections on the Practice of Law," in his memory. A Resolution and Memorial in honor of Judge McKnight was filed in Mecklenburg County Superior Court in Charlotte on February 11, 2005.

== Sources ==
Legal offices
Preceded by Seat established by 116 Stat. 1758	Judge of the United States District Court for the Western District of North Carolina; 2003–2004	Succeeded by Frank DeArmon Whitney
