= James Bryan McMillan =

American judge (1916–1995)

Senior Judge of the United States District Court for the Western District of North Carolina
- In office September 1, 1989 – March 4, 1995

Judge of the United States District Court for the Western District of North Carolina
- In office June 7, 1968 – September 1, 1989
- Appointed by: Lyndon B. Johnson
- Preceded by: Wilson Warlick
- Succeeded by: Graham Calder Mullen

Personal details
- Born: James Bryan McMillan; December 19, 1916 Goldsboro, North Carolina, U.S.
- Died: March 4, 1995 (aged 78) Charlotte, North Carolina, U.S.
- Education: University of North Carolina at Chapel Hill (A.B.); Harvard Law School (LL.B.)

James Bryan McMillan (December 19, 1916 – March 4, 1995) was a United States district judge of the United States District Court for the Western District of North Carolina.

== Education and career ==
Born in Goldsboro, North Carolina, McMillan received an Artium Baccalaureus degree from the University of North Carolina at Chapel Hill in 1937. He received a Bachelor of Laws from Harvard Law School in 1940. He was a staff attorney of the State Attorney General's Office for North Carolina from 1940 to 1942. He was in the United States Navy as a Senior Lieutenant from 1942 to 1946. He was in the private practice of law in Charlotte, North Carolina from 1946 to 1968. He was a judge pro tem of the Charlotte City Court from 1947 to 1951. He was a lecturer at the University of North Carolina School of Law from 1975 to 1979. He was a lecturer at the Fredric G. Levin College of Law at the University of Florida from 1979 to 1980.

== Federal judicial service ==
McMillan was nominated by President Lyndon B. Johnson on April 25, 1968, to a seat on the United States District Court for the Western District of North Carolina vacated by Judge Wilson Warlick. He was confirmed by the United States Senate on June 6, 1968, and received his commission on June 7, 1968. He assumed senior status on September 1, 1989. His service was terminated on March 4, 1995, due to his death in Charlotte.

=== Notable case ===
McMillan became one of the first United States district court judges to explicitly approve busing as a remedy for racially segregated schools in the spring of 1970. In the case, he also set racial balance as a standard by which progress in desegregation could be measured. Instantly controversial, McMillan received death threats due to his opinion, and needed to be placed under police protection. The case (Swann v. Charlotte-Mecklenburg Board of Education) soon reached the Supreme Court, where it was the subject of intense debate and negotiations among the justices. Eventually, a unanimous court ruled to uphold McMillan's orders. He achieved temporary fame in the aftermath of this decision, appearing in newspapers across the country, including the New York Times.

== Sources ==
Legal offices
Preceded by Wilson Warlick	Judge of the United States District Court for the Western District of North Carolina; 1968–1989	Succeeded by Graham Calder Mullen
