= Robert C. Ervin =

American lawyer

Robert C. Ervin (born 1960) is a North Carolina Superior Court judge who has presided over numerous high-profile cases. He is the grandson of U.S. Senator Sam J. Ervin, the son of U.S. Court of Appeals Judge Samuel James Ervin III and the brother of state Supreme Court Justice Sam J. Ervin IV.

== Early life and education ==
Ervin is a native of Morganton, North Carolina, graduating from Freedom High School. He went on to graduate from Davidson College with a Bachelor of Arts degree in 1982, and from Harvard Law School with a juris doctor degree in 1985. He was admitted to the bar in North Carolina in 1985.

== Career ==
After practicing law in Charlotte for several years, Ervin joined the Morganton law firm that became known as Byrd, Byrd, Ervin, Whisnant, McMahon and Ervin. He practiced with that firm from 1988 until shortly after he was elected to an eight-year term as a Superior Court judge by voters in District 25A (Burke and Caldwell counties) in 2002.

The North Carolina Advocates for Justice named Ervin "Outstanding Trial Judge of the Year" in 2008. He also was appointed by the chief justice of the North Carolina Supreme Court to serve on the Indigent Defense Services Commission and the Rural Courts Commission.

In 2009, Ervin was one of three candidates recommended by U.S. Senator Kay Hagan to the President for appointment as a judge of the United States District Court for the Western District of North Carolina. The appointment eventually went to Max O. Cogburn Jr.

Ervin and fellow District 25A Superior Court Judge Beverly Beal were re-elected without opposition in 2010. He was re-elected without opposition again in 2018.

Among his most notable cases has been the trial of police officer Randall Kerrick for the shooting of Jonathan Ferrell. The case ended in a mistrial. He also presided over legal proceedings regarding the control of the Charlotte Douglas International Airport. He handled the case in which Bruton Smith sued Cabarrus County over economic incentives. The Charlotte Observer wrote that Ervin is "well-known...for his calm bench demeanor."

In 2007, Ervin ordered a new trial for death row inmate Glen Edward Chapman, finding that "law enforcement officials withheld evidence, used false testimony, and misplaced or destroyed important documents that could have supported Chapman's innocence claim." Chapman was eventually freed after his murder charges were dismissed.

Ervin dismissed a 2016 suit filed by two former University of North Carolina at Chapel Hill student-athletes against the university, alleging fraud in connection with "bogus" classes (see "University of North Carolina academic-athletic scandal").

In 2021, Ervin removed district attorney Greg Newman from office for "willful misconduct in office" and "conduct prejudicial to the administration of justice which brings the office into disrepute".

== Personal life ==
Ervin and his wife, Dana Miller Ervin, have two daughters. He is a member of First Presbyterian Church of Morganton and is the former president of Habitat for Humanity of Burke County.
