= Graham Calder Mullen =

American judge (born 1940)

Senior Judge of the United States District Court for the Western District of North Carolina
- Incumbent
- Assumed office December 1, 2005

Chief Judge of the United States District Court for the Western District of North Carolina
- In office 1998–2005
- Preceded by: Richard Lesley Voorhees
- Succeeded by: Robert J. Conrad

Judge of the United States District Court for the Western District of North Carolina
- In office September 11, 1990 – December 1, 2005
- Appointed by: George H. W. Bush
- Preceded by: James Bryan McMillan
- Succeeded by: Martin Karl Reidinger

Personal details
- Born: Graham Calder Mullen; 1940 (age 85–86) Charlotte, North Carolina, U.S.
- Education: Duke University (BA, JD)

Graham Calder Mullen (born 1940) is a senior United States district judge of the United States District Court for the Western District of North Carolina.

== Education and career ==
Mullen was born in Gastonia, North Carolina. He received a Bachelor of Arts degree from Duke University in 1962 and a Juris Doctor from Duke University School of Law in 1969. He was a lieutenant in the United States Navy from 1962 to 1966. He was then in private practice in Gastonia, North Carolina from 1969 to 1990.

=== Federal judicial service ===
On February 20, 1990, Mullen was nominated by President George H. W. Bush to a seat on the United States District Court for the Western District of North Carolina vacated by Judge James Bryan McMillan. Mullen was confirmed by the United States Senate on September 10, 1990, and received his commission on September 11, 1990. He served as Chief Judge from 1998 to 2005. He assumed senior status on December 1, 2005.

== Sources ==
Legal offices
Preceded by James Bryan McMillan	Judge of the United States District Court for the Western District of North Carolina; 1990–2005	Succeeded by Martin Karl Reidinger
Preceded by Richard Lesley Voorhees	Chief Judge of the United States District Court for the Western District of North Carolina; 1998–2005	Succeeded by Robert J. Conrad
