= David Ezekiel Henderson =

American judge

Judge of the United States District Court for the Western District of North Carolina
- In office September 1, 1948 – February 14, 1949
- Appointed by: Harry S. Truman
- Preceded by: Edwin Y. Webb
- Succeeded by: Wilson Warlick

Personal details
- Born: David Ezekiel Henderson; September 3, 1879 Deppe, North Carolina, U.S.
- Died: July 25, 1968 (aged 88)
- Education: University of North Carolina at Chapel Hill read law

David Ezekiel Henderson (September 3, 1879 – July 25, 1968) was a United States district judge of the United States District Court for the Western District of North Carolina.

== Education and career ==
Born in Deppe, (an unincorporated community near White Oak), North Carolina, Henderson attended the University of North Carolina at Chapel Hill and read law in 1905. He was in private practice in New Bern, North Carolina from 1905 to 1918, and then in Charlotte, North Carolina from 1918 to 1945. He was the United States Attorney for the Western District of North Carolina from 1945 to 1948.

== Federal judicial service ==
Henderson received a recess appointment from President Harry S. Truman on September 1, 1948, to a seat on the United States District Court for the Western District of North Carolina vacated by Judge Edwin Y. Webb. His service terminated on February 14, 1949, due to his resignation. He was never formally nominated by President Truman.

== Later career and death ==
Henderson returned to private practice in Charlotte until his death on July 25, 1968.

== Sources ==
Legal offices
Preceded by Edwin Y. Webb	Judge of the United States District Court for the Western District of North Carolina; 1948–1949	Succeeded by Wilson Warlick
