= Woodrow W. Jones =

American judge (1914–2002)

Woodrow Jones
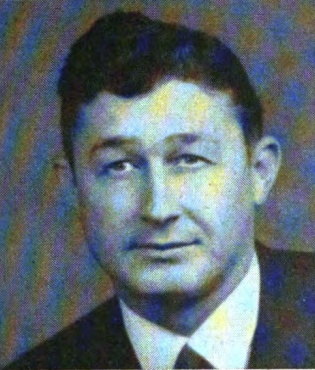

Senior Judge of the United States District Court for the Western District of North Carolina
- In office February 1, 1985 – November 25, 2002

Chief Judge of the United States District Court for the Western District of North Carolina
- In office 1968–1984
- Preceded by: Wilson Warlick
- Succeeded by: Robert Daniel Potter

Judge of the United States District Court for the Western District of North Carolina
- In office June 28, 1967 – February 1, 1985
- Appointed by: Lyndon B. Johnson
- Preceded by: James Braxton Craven Jr.
- Succeeded by: David B. Sentelle

Member of the U.S. House of Representatives from North Carolina's 11th district
- In office November 7, 1950 – January 3, 1957
- Preceded by: Alfred L. Bulwinkle
- Succeeded by: Basil Lee Whitener

Personal details
- Born: Woodrow Wilson Jones; January 26, 1914 Rutherfordton, North Carolina, U.S.
- Died: November 25, 2002 (aged 88) Rutherfordton, North Carolina, U.S.
- Resting place: Rutherfordton City Cemetery; Rutherfordton, North Carolina
- Party: Democratic
- Education: Mars Hill College (AA); Wake Forest University School of Law (LLB)

Woodrow Wilson Jones (January 26, 1914 – November 25, 2002) was a United States representative from North Carolina and a United States district judge of the United States District Court for the Western District of North Carolina.

Jones was nominated by President Lyndon B. Johnson on June 27, 1967, to a seat vacated by J. Braxton Craven, Jr. He was confirmed by the United States Senate on June 28, 1967, and received commission the same day. Served as chief judge, 1968–1984. Assumed senior status on February 1, 1985. Jones's service was terminated on November 25, 2002, due to death.

== Education and career ==
Born on January 26, 1914, in Rutherfordton, (Note: FJC Bio indicates he was born in Rutherfordton, while Cong Bio indicates he was born in the adjacent Green Hill Township.) Rutherford County, North Carolina, Jones attended the public schools of Rutherford County. He received an Associate of Arts degree from Mars Hill College in 1934. He received a Bachelor of Laws from Wake Forest University School of Law in 1937. He was in private practice of law in Rutherfordton from 1937 to 1944. He was City Attorney of Rutherfordton from 1940 to 1943. He was prosecuting attorney of the Rutherford County Recorder's Court from 1941 to 1943. He was a United States Naval Reserve Lieutenant (j.g.) from 1944 to 1946. He was in private practice of law in Rutherfordton from 1946 to 1950. He was a Member of the North Carolina House of Representatives from 1947 to 1949. He was a United States representative from North Carolina from 1950 to 1957. He was in private practice of law in Rutherfordton from 1956 to 1967.

== Congressional and subsequent political service ==
Jones was elected as a Democrat to the 81st Congress to fill the vacancy caused by the death of United States Representative Alfred L. Bulwinkle. He was reelected to the three succeeding Congresses, serving from November 7, 1950, to January 3, 1957, but was not a candidate for renomination to the 85th Congress in 1956. He was a delegate to all Democratic State Conventions from 1940 to 1960 and was a delegate to the Democratic National Convention in 1960. He was the Chairman of the North Carolina Democratic Party Executive Committee from 1958 to 1960. He was appointed by Governor Luther Hodges as a member of state constitution commission from 1958 to 1960.

Jones was a signatory to the 1956 Southern Manifesto that opposed the desegregation of public schools ordered by the Supreme Court in Brown v. Board of Education.

== Federal judicial service ==
Jones was nominated by President Lyndon B. Johnson on June 27, 1967, to a seat on the United States District Court for the Western District of North Carolina vacated by Judge James Braxton Craven Jr. He was confirmed by the United States Senate on June 28, 1967, and received his commission the same day. He served as Chief Judge from 1968 to 1984. He assumed senior status on February 1, 1985. He presided over the criminal proceedings related to Project WestVote, a large federal investigation into vote-buying in western North Carolina. His service was terminated on November 25, 2002, due to his death in Rutherfordton. He was interred in the Rutherfordton City Cemetery in Rutherfordton.

U.S. House of Representatives
Preceded by Alfred L. Bulwinkle	Member of the U.S. House of Representatives from North Carolina's 11th congressional district 1950–1957	Succeeded by Basil Lee Whitener
Legal offices
Preceded by James Braxton Craven Jr.	Judge of the United States District Court for the Western District of North Carolina; 1967–1985	Succeeded by David B. Sentelle
Preceded by Wilson Warlick	Chief Judge of the United States District Court for the Western District of North Carolina; 1968–1984	Succeeded by Robert Daniel Potter
