= Susan C. Rodriguez =

American judge (born 1981)

Susan Courtwright Rodriguez
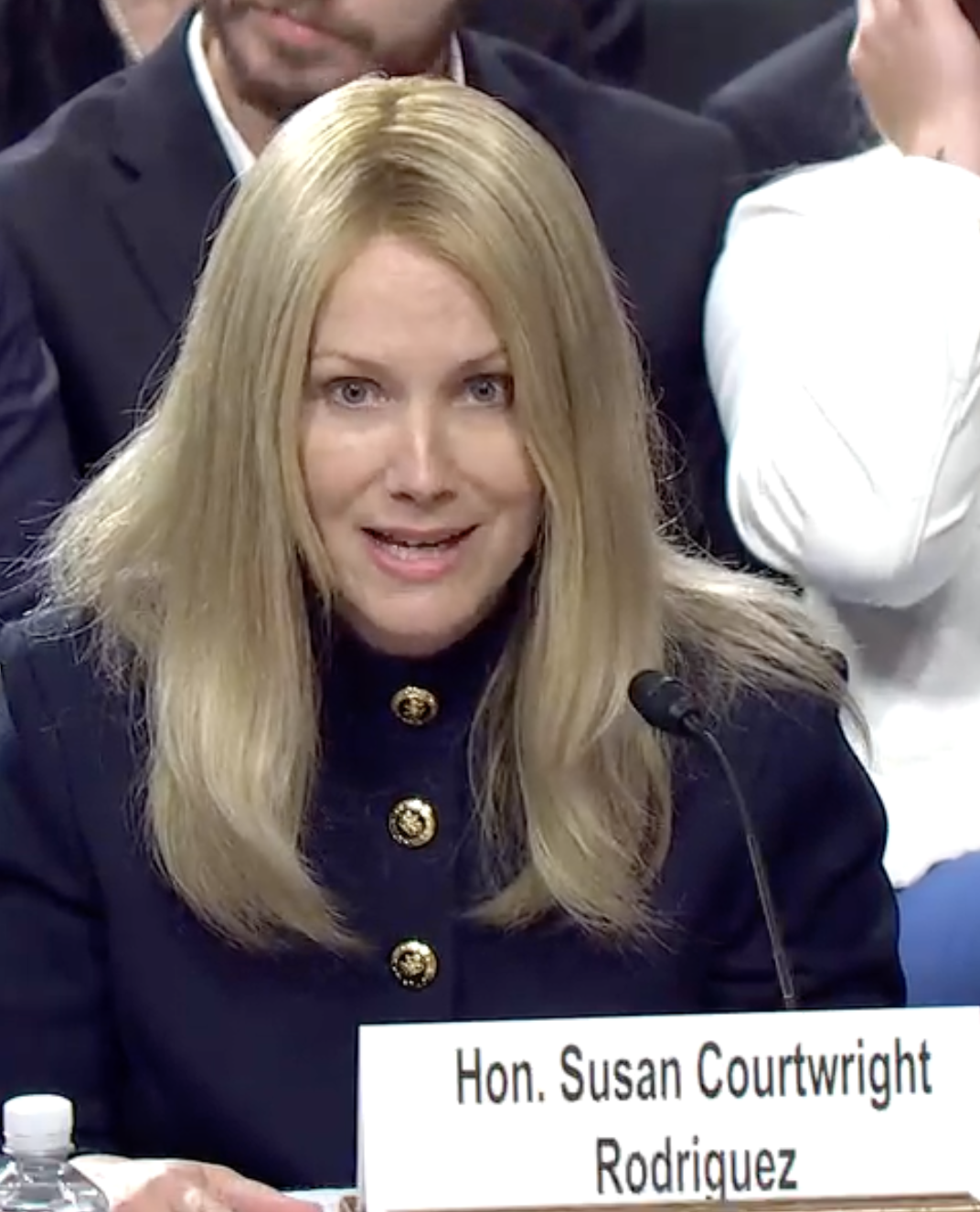

Judge of the United States District Court for the Western District of North Carolina
- Incumbent
- Assumed office December 6, 2025
- Appointed by: Donald Trump
- Preceded by: Frank DeArmon Whitney

Personal details
- Born: Susan Mauritia Courtwright; 1981 (age 44–45) Lebanon, Kentucky, U.S.
- Education: Centre College (BA); George Mason University (JD)
- Awards: Kentucky Colonel

Susan Courtwright Rodriguez (née Courtwright; born 1981) is a United States district judge of the United States District Court for the Western District of North Carolina. She previously served as a United States magistrate judge of the same court.

== Early life and education ==
Rodriguez was born Susan Mauritia Courtwright in 1981 in Lebanon, Kentucky. She received a Bachelor of Arts degree from Centre College in 2003 and her Juris Doctor from George Mason University School of Law (now Antonin Scalia Law School) in 2009. Rodriguez was appointed as a Kentucky Colonel in June 2003.

== Career ==
In 2011, she was hired to be an associate at McGuireWoods LLP at their Charlotte office and later became a partner, ultimately being promoted to co-leader of the firm's financial institutions industry team. From 2023 to 2025, Rodriguez was a United States magistrate judge of the United States District Court for the Western District of North Carolina.

=== Federal judicial service ===
On August 22, 2025, President Donald Trump announced his intention to nominate Rodriguez to a seat on the United States District Court for the Western District of North Carolina vacated by Judge Frank DeArmon Whitney. The nomination was sent to the United States Senate on September 15, 2025. On September 17, 2025, a confirmation hearing was held for her and other nominees before the Senate Judiciary Committee. On October 9, 2025, the committee favorably reported her confirmation by a 17–5 vote. On December 3, 2025, the United States Senate invoked cloture on her nomination by a 63–34 vote. On December 4, 2025, her nomination was confirmed by a 57–32 vote. She received her judicial commission on December 6, 2025.

Legal offices
Preceded by Frank DeArmon Whitney	Judge of the United States District Court for the Western District of North Carolina; 2025–present	Incumbent
