= Charles A. Jonas =

American politician

Charles Andrew Jonas

Member of the U.S. House of Representatives from North Carolina's 9th district
- In office March 4, 1929 – March 3, 1931
- Preceded by: Alfred L. Bulwinkle
- Succeeded by: Alfred L. Bulwinkle

United States Attorney for the Western District of North Carolina
- In office April 1, 1931 – July 1, 1932
- Preceded by: Thomas J. Harkins
- Succeeded by: Frank Caldwell Patton

Personal details
- Born: August 14, 1876 Lincolnton, North Carolina, U.S.
- Died: May 25, 1955 (aged 78) Charlotte, North Carolina, U.S.
- Resting place: Hollybrook Cemetery, Lincolnton, North Carolina, U.S.
- Party: Republican

Charles Andrew Jonas (August 14, 1876 – May 25, 1955) was an American attorney and politician, serving one term as a U.S. representative from western North Carolina from 1929 to 1931. A Republican, he was appointed as United States Attorney for the western district of North Carolina, serving from April 1, 1931, to July 1, 1932. Jonas later unsuccessfully ran for the US Senate and House of Representatives.

He and his son Charles R. Jonas had a law practice together in Lincolnton, the county seat of Lincoln County. His son also entered politics, serving for two decades (1953–1973) as a Congressman from North Carolina and building up the Republican Party in the state.

== Early life and education ==
Jonas was born on a farm near Lincolnton, North Carolina, the son of Martha Diane (Scronce) and Cephas Anderson Jonas. Jonas attended the public schools, Ridge Academy in Henry, North Carolina, and the Fallston (North Carolina) Institute.

He graduated from the University of North Carolina at Chapel Hill in 1902. Jonas taught school from 1902 to 1906, while also studying law as an apprentice with an established firm (known as "reading the law").

== Law and politics ==
Jonas was admitted to the bar in 1906 and commenced practice in Lincolnton. He joined the Republican Party and was appointed as the local United States Postmaster at Lincolnton, serving 1907-1910 during the Theodore Roosevelt administration. He became editor of a local newspaper which he helped to establish in 1906.

Jonas served as City Attorney of Lincolnton 1908–1912. He was elected to the North Carolina Senate in 1914, serving 1915–1919. Active in the party, he served as delegate to the Republican National Conventions in 1916, 1932, and 1936.

He was an unsuccessful candidate for election to the Sixty-sixth Congress in 1918. After returning to his law practice, he was appointed during President Warren G. Harding's administration as assistant United States attorney for the western district of North Carolina, serving 1921–1925.

Jonas was elected to two terms, separated by years, to the North Carolina House of Representatives, serving 1927–1929 and 1935–1937. He also served as a member of the Republican National Committee.

Jonas was elected in 1928 as a Republican to the 71st United States Congress (March 4, 1929 – March 3, 1931), defeating Alfred L. Bulwinkle. He served during the Stock Market Crash and onset of the Great Depression. That year his son Charles R. Jonas joined him in his law practice, which they named Jonas and Jonas. His son also became active in the Republican Party.

The senior Jonas did not succeed in winning re-election to Congress in 1930 or 1932, when many Democrats won on the strength of Franklin D. Roosevelt's coattails. Jonas lost to Bulwinkle who had he defeated in the prior election.

He was appointed as United States attorney for the western district of North Carolina, serving from April 1, 1931, to July 1, 1932. He was an unsuccessful candidate for election to the United States Senate in 1938. He was an unsuccessful candidate for election in 1942 to the Seventy-eighth Congress.

== Later years ==
Jonas resumed the general practice of law at Lincolnton, North Carolina. He died in a nursing home near Charlotte, North Carolina, on May 25, 1955. He was interred in Hollybrook Cemetery, Lincolnton, North Carolina.

Party political offices
Preceded by Jake F. Newell	Republican nominee for U.S. Senator from North Carolina (Class 3); 1938	Succeeded by A. I. Ferree
Political offices
Preceded by Alfred L. Bulwinkle	Member of the U.S. House of Representatives from North Carolina's 9th congressional district 1929-1931	Succeeded by Alfred L. Bulwinkle
