= Jerry Spivey =

Jerry Spivey (born May 12, 1942) is an American attorney who was district attorney of North Carolina's 5th Judicial District, which consisted of New Hanover and Pender Counties, from 1983 until his removal from office in 1995.

== Biography ==
Spivey was born in Whiteville, North Carolina on May 12, 1942. He graduated from the University of North Carolina at Chapel Hill in 1964 and the University of North Carolina School of Law in 1967. He was an attorney in private practice for sixteen years before being elected district attorney in 1982. He succeeded retiring DA W. Allen Cobb, who had been in office since 1967. He was sworn in on January 1, 1983. He was reelected three times.

In 1993, Spivey declined to file charges in connection with the death of Brandon Lee, who was shot on the set of the film The Crow in Wilmington, North Carolina after a police investigation ruled the shooting an accident due to negligence.

On June 30, 1995, Spivey called Denver Broncos linebacker Ray Jacobs a nigger during an argument at a Wrightsville Beach, North Carolina bar. Spivey publicly apologized and admitted to having a drinking problem. He refused a request from the Pender County commission to resign. Two black lawyers, Peter Grear and Terry B. Richardson, the latter a former assistant under Spivey, filed a petition with the North Carolina Superior Court seeking Spivey's removal from office for "conduct prejudicial to the administration of justice". On August 29, 1995, judge Richard Allsbrook ruled that Spivey had engaged in prejudicial conduct and removed him from office. He was the first district attorney in North Carolina to be removed from office. Governor Jim Hunt appointed senior assistant district attorney John E. Carriker to succeed Spivey on an interim basis. Spivey challenged his ouster on the grounds that the law providing for the removal of district attorneys violated the Constitution of North Carolina and his use of a racial slur was protected by the First Amendment to the United States Constitution. On February 10, 1997, the North Carolina Supreme Court unanimously ruled against Spivey.
