= Wilson Warlick =

American judge

Senior Judge of the United States District Court for the Western District of North Carolina
- In office June 24, 1968 – January 30, 1978

Chief Judge of the United States District Court for the Western District of North Carolina
- In office 1966–1968
- Preceded by: James Braxton Craven Jr.
- Succeeded by: Woodrow W. Jones

Chief Judge of the United States District Court for the Western District of North Carolina
- In office 1961–1962
- Preceded by: Office established
- Succeeded by: James Braxton Craven Jr.

Judge of the United States District Court for the Western District of North Carolina
- In office February 2, 1949 – June 24, 1968
- Appointed by: Harry S. Truman
- Preceded by: David Ezekiel Henderson
- Succeeded by: James Bryan McMillan

Personal details
- Born: Wilson Warlick; March 8, 1892 Newton, North Carolina, U.S.
- Died: January 30, 1978 (aged 85)
- Education: Catawba College (BS); University of North Carolina School of Law (LLB)

Wilson Warlick (March 8, 1892 – January 30, 1978) was a United States district judge of the United States District Court for the Western District of North Carolina.

== Education and career ==
Born in Newton, North Carolina, Warlick received a Bachelor of Science degree from Catawba College in 1911 and a Bachelor of Laws from the University of North Carolina School of Law in 1913. He was in private practice of law in Newton from 1913 to 1930. He was a Judge of the Superior Court for the 16th Judicial District of North Carolina from 1931 to 1949.

== Federal judicial service ==
Warlick was nominated by President Harry S. Truman on January 13, 1949, to a seat on the United States District Court for the Western District of North Carolina vacated by Judge David Ezekiel Henderson. He was confirmed by the United States Senate on January 31, 1949, and received his commission on February 2, 1949. He served as Chief Judge from 1961 to 1962 and from 1966 to 1968. Warlick assumed senior status on June 24, 1968 and served in that status until his death on January 30, 1978.

== Sources ==
Legal offices
Preceded by David Ezekiel Henderson	Judge of the United States District Court for the Western District of North Carolina; 1949–1968	Succeeded by James Bryan McMillan
Preceded by Office established	Chief Judge of the United States District Court for the Western District of North Carolina; 1961–1962	Succeeded by James Braxton Craven Jr.
Preceded by James Braxton Craven Jr.	Chief Judge of the United States District Court for the Western District of North Carolina; 1966–1968	Succeeded by Woodrow W. Jones
