= James Dickson Phillips Jr. =

American judge (1922–2017)

Senior Judge of the United States Court of Appeals for the Fourth Circuit
- In office July 31, 1994 – August 27, 2017

Judge of the United States Court of Appeals for the Fourth Circuit
- In office August 11, 1978 – July 31, 1994
- Appointed by: Jimmy Carter
- Preceded by: James Braxton Craven Jr.
- Succeeded by: James Andrew Wynn

Personal details
- Born: James Dickson Phillips Jr. September 23, 1922 Scotland County, North Carolina, U.S.
- Died: August 27, 2017 (aged 94) Chapel Hill, North Carolina, U.S.
- Education: Davidson College (BS); University of North Carolina (JD)

James Dickson Phillips Jr. (September 23, 1922 – August 27, 2017) was an American attorney and jurist who served as a United States circuit judge of the United States Court of Appeals for the Fourth Circuit.

== Early life and education ==
Born in Scotland County, North Carolina, Phillips grew up in Laurinburg, North Carolina and attended its public schools. He graduated from high school in 1939 as the salutatorian of his graduating class. He earned a Bachelor of Science degree Phi Beta Kappa in 1943 from Davidson College and a Juris Doctor in 1948 from the University of North Carolina School of Law, where he was associate editor of the school's law review and a member of the Order of the Coif.

=== Military service ===
Phillips was a First Lieutenant in the United States Army from 1943 until 1946. He served as a rifle platoon leader in the 17th Airborne Division's 513th Parachute Regiment while it took part in three European campaigns: the Ardennes, Rhineland and Central Europe. Following a parachute drop over the Rhine River on March 28, 1945, Phillips was wounded, evacuated and remained hospitalized until the end of World War II. Phillips ultimately was awarded the Bronze Star, the Purple Heart and a Presidential Unit Citation.

== Career ==
Phillips served as the assistant director of the Institute of Government in Chapel Hill, North Carolina from 1948 until 1949, and then he worked in private law practice in Laurinburg from 1949 until 1955. From 1955 until 1959, he worked in private law practice in Fayetteville, North Carolina. From 1960 until 1964, Phillips was a lecturer and an associate professor of law at the University of North Carolina School of Law. He then became a professor of law at the same institution from 1964 until 1978, specializing in procedural law. He concurrently served as the school's dean from 1964 until 1974.

=== Federal judicial service ===
Phillips was nominated by President Jimmy Carter on July 20, 1978, to a seat on the United States Court of Appeals for the Fourth Circuit vacated by Judge James Braxton Craven Jr. He was confirmed by the United States Senate on August 11, 1978, and received commission the same day. He assumed senior status on July 31, 1994, serving in that status until his death at his home in Chapel Hill. From 1994 to 1995 he had as a law clerk Mitchell N. Berman, who later became a Professor of Law at the University of Pennsylvania Law School.

Legal offices
Preceded by James Braxton Craven Jr.	Judge of the United States Court of Appeals for the Fourth Circuit; 1978–1994	Succeeded by James Andrew Wynn
