= Martin Karl Reidinger =

American judge (born 1958)

Martin Reidinger

Chief Judge of the United States District Court for the Western District of North Carolina
- Incumbent
- Assumed office June 2, 2020
- Preceded by: Frank DeArmon Whitney

Judge of the United States District Court for the Western District of North Carolina
- Incumbent
- Assumed office September 12, 2007
- Appointed by: George W. Bush
- Preceded by: Graham Calder Mullen

Personal details
- Born: Martin Karl Reidinger; December 18, 1958 (age 67) New Haven, Connecticut, U.S.
- Education: University of North Carolina, Chapel Hill (BA, JD)

Martin Karl Reidinger (born December 18, 1958) is the chief United States district judge of the United States District Court for the Western District of North Carolina.

== Education and career ==
Born in New Haven, Connecticut, Reidinger received a Bachelor of Arts degree from the University of North Carolina at Chapel Hill in 1981 and a Juris Doctor from the University of North Carolina School of Law in 1984. He practiced as a civil litigator at Adams, Hendon, Carson, Crow & Saenger in Asheville from 1984 to 2007.

== Federal judicial service ==
President George W. Bush first nominated Reidinger to a seat on the United States District Court for the Western District of North Carolina, vacated by Graham Calder Mullen, on September 29, 2006. The nomination did not receive a Senate vote before end of the congressional session, with Bush renominating Reidinger on January 9, 2007. Reidinger was confirmed by the United States Senate on September 10, 2007, and received his commission on September 12, 2007. He became chief judge on June 2, 2020.

== Personal life ==
Reidinger is married, has four children, and lives in Asheville, North Carolina.

Legal offices
Preceded by Graham Calder Mullen	Judge of the United States District Court for the Western District of North Carolina; 2007–present	Incumbent
Preceded by Frank DeArmon Whitney	Chief Judge of the United States District Court for the Western District of North Carolina; 2020–present	Incumbent
