= James Braxton Craven Jr. =

American judge (1918–1977)

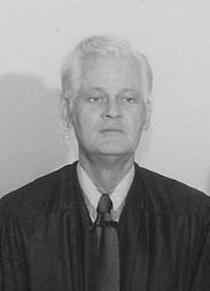
- Craven in 1973

Judge of the United States Court of Appeals for the Fourth Circuit
- In office June 29, 1966 – May 3, 1977
- Appointed by: Lyndon B. Johnson
- Preceded by: Seat established by 80 Stat. 75
- Succeeded by: James Dickson Phillips Jr.

Chief Judge of the United States District Court for the Western District of North Carolina
- In office 1962–1966
- Preceded by: Wilson Warlick
- Succeeded by: Wilson Warlick

Judge of the United States District Court for the Western District of North Carolina
- In office August 10, 1961 – July 5, 1966
- Appointed by: John F. Kennedy
- Preceded by: Seat established by 75 Stat. 80
- Succeeded by: Woodrow W. Jones

Personal details
- Born: James Braxton Craven Jr. April 3, 1918 Lenoir, North Carolina, U.S.
- Died: May 3, 1977 (aged 59) Richmond, Virginia, U.S.
- Education: Duke University (AB); Harvard University (LLB)

James Braxton Craven Jr. (April 3, 1918 – May 3, 1977) was a United States circuit judge of the United States Court of Appeals for the Fourth Circuit and previously was a United States district judge of the United States District Court for the Western District of North Carolina.

== Education and career ==
Born in Lenoir, North Carolina, Craven received an Artium Baccalaureus degree from Duke University in 1939 and a Bachelor of Laws from Harvard Law School in 1942. He was a solicitor for Burke County, North Carolina in 1947. He was in private practice of law in Charlotte and Asheville, North Carolina from 1948 to 1956. He was an Assistant United States Attorney for the Western District of North Carolina from 1948 to 1952. Governor Luther H. Hodges appointed him a special judge of the North Carolina Superior Court, where he served from 1956 to 1961.

== Federal judicial service ==
Craven was nominated by President John F. Kennedy on July 24, 1961, to the United States District Court for the Western District of North Carolina, to a new seat authorized by 75 Stat. 80. He was confirmed by the United States Senate on August 9, 1961, and received his commission on August 10, 1961. He served as Chief Judge from 1962 to 1966. His service terminated on July 5, 1966, due to elevation to the Fourth Circuit.

Craven was nominated by President Lyndon B. Johnson on June 13, 1966, to the United States Court of Appeals for the Fourth Circuit, to a new seat authorized by 80 Stat. 75. He was confirmed by the Senate on June 29, 1966, and received his commission on June 29, 1966. His service terminated on May 3, 1977, due to his death in Richmond, Virginia.

== Sources ==
- Holderness Moot Court

Legal offices
Preceded by Seat established by 75 Stat. 80	Judge of the United States District Court for the Western District of North Carolina; 1961–1966	Succeeded by Woodrow W. Jones
Preceded by Wilson Warlick	Chief Judge of the United States District Court for the Western District of North Carolina; 1962–1966	Succeeded by Wilson Warlick
Preceded by Seat established by 80 Stat. 75	Judge of the United States Court of Appeals for the Fourth Circuit; 1966–1977	Succeeded by James Dickson Phillips Jr.
