= Charles R. Jonas =

American politician (1904–1988)

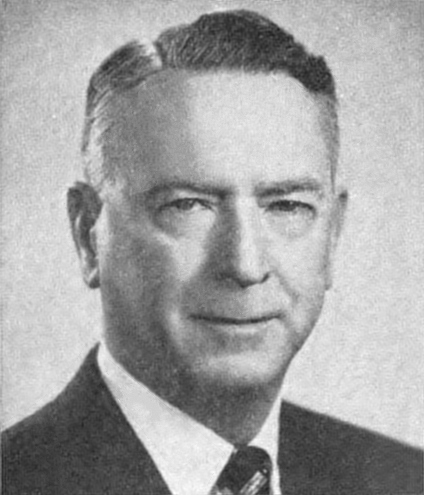

Member of the U.S. House of Representatives from North Carolina
- In office January 3, 1953 – January 3, 1973
- Preceded by: Hamilton C. Jones
- Succeeded by: Jim Martin
- Constituency: 10th District (1953–1963); 8th District (1963–1969); 9th District (1969–1973)

Personal details
- Born: December 9, 1904 Lincolnton, North Carolina, U.S.
- Died: September 28, 1988 (aged 83) Lincolnton, North Carolina, U.S.
- Party: Republican
- Spouse: Annie Elliott Lee
- Children: 2
- Education: University of North Carolina at Chapel Hill

Charles Raper Jonas (December 9, 1904 – September 28, 1988) was a U.S. representative from North Carolina for ten terms (1953–1973). At the time of his election in 1952, he became the first Republican to represent his state in either house of the U.S. Congress since his own father, Charles A. Jonas, and George M. Pritchard left office in 1931.

== Life and career ==
Jonas was born and grew up in Lincolnton, North Carolina, where he attended public schools, which were then racially segregated. He graduated from Lincolnton High School in 1921, where he was voted "Best All Around Member of his Senior Class". He graduated from the University of North Carolina with an AB degree in 1925 and a Juris Doctor with high honors in 1928. As an undergraduate, he was president of the Dialectic Society (1925) and the Monogram Club, and was president of the Class of 1925. In law school, he was student body president in 1926 and founded the school's College Republicans chapter in 1927. He was editor-in-chief of the North Carolina Law Review from 1927 to 1928 and a member of the Order of the Coif.

After graduating from law school, he entered into the law practice of his father, Charles A. Jonas. The firm was renamed as Jonas and Jonas in 1928. His father had been the first Republican elected from North Carolina to serve in Congress in the twentieth century following the disenfranchisement of African Americans by a new suffrage amendment in 1900, which cut them out of the political system and reduced membership in the Republican Party. Jonas later was a Republican candidate for the U. S. Senate, but the state legislature chose a Democratic candidate. The younger Jonas entered the National Guard for the state.

From 1931 to 1932, Jonas served briefly as an appointed Assistant United States Attorney for the Western District of North Carolina. In September 1940 he was called to active service as a member of the North Carolina National Guard. During World War II he served in the United States Army Judge Advocate General's Corps, rising to the rank of lieutenant colonel in 1945. While later serving in the Judge Advocate General Corps of the North Carolina National Guard, Jonas reached the rank of brigadier general.

He was a member of the North Carolina Bar Association, serving as president, 1946–1957. He also served on the North Carolina Board of Law Examiners, 1948–1949.

While in Congress, Jonas served for nearly two decades, from 1954 to 1972, on the important House Appropriations Committee. During this period, the committee cut more than $93 billion from budgets proposed by four presidents: Eisenhower, Kennedy, Johnson, and Nixon. Jonas signed onto the 1956 Southern Manifesto that opposed the desegregation of public schools ordered by the Supreme Court in Brown v. Board of Education and voted against the Civil Rights Acts of 1957, 1960, 1964, and 1968, as well as the Voting Rights Act of 1965. He did, however, support the 24th Amendment to the U.S. Constitution.

Jonas' long and pioneering service to the Republican Party in North Carolina and his efforts to make North Carolina a competitive two-party state, earned him the nickname, "Mr. Republican". He retired in 1972, declining to run for an eleventh term. The General Assembly of North Carolina passed a joint resolution in 1991 honoring the life of Jonas "former Congressman and 'Mister Republican.'"Jonas lived most of his life in Lincolnton, North Carolina.

== Legacy and honors ==
- The public library in Lincolnton, North Carolina, is named in his honor.
- The federal building in Charlotte, North Carolina, is named for him, as is a section of North Carolina Highway 27. This highway connects Charlotte to cities to its north, including Jonas's hometown of Lincolnton. *His home at Lincolnton, Shadow Lawn, was listed on the National Register of Historic Places in 1972.

U.S. House of Representatives
Preceded by Hamilton C. Jones	Member of the U.S. House of Representatives from North Carolina's 10th congressional district 1953–1963	Succeeded by Basil L. Whitener
Preceded by A. Paul Kitchin	Member of the U.S. House of Representatives from North Carolina's 8th congressional district 1963–1969	Succeeded by Earl B. Ruth
Preceded by Jim Broyhill	Member of the U.S. House of Representatives from North Carolina's 9th congressional district 1969–1973	Succeeded by Jim Martin
