= United States District Court for the Western District of North Carolina =

United States federal district court in North Carolina

- (W.D.N.C.)
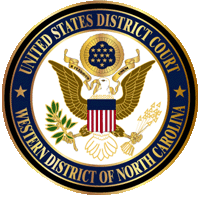
- Location: Charles R. Jonas Federal Building (Charlotte) More locations: Asheville; Statesville
- Appeals to: Fourth Circuit
- Established: June 4, 1872
- Judges: 5
- Chief Judge: Martin Karl Reidinger

Officers of the court
- U.S. Attorney: Russ Ferguson
- U.S. Marshal: Terry J. Burgin
- www.ncwd.uscourts.gov

The United States District Court for the Western District of North Carolina (in case citations, W.D.N.C.) is a federal district court which covers the western third of North Carolina.

Appeals from the Western District of North Carolina are taken to the United States Court of Appeals for the Fourth Circuit (except for patent claims and claims against the U.S. government under the Tucker Act, which are appealed to the Federal Circuit).

== Jurisdiction ==
The court's jurisdiction comprises the following counties: Alexander, Alleghany, Anson, Ashe, Avery, Buncombe, Burke, Caldwell, Catawba, Cherokee, Clay, Cleveland, Gaston, Graham, Haywood, Henderson, Iredell, Jackson, Lincoln, Macon, Madison, McDowell, Mecklenburg, Mitchell, Polk, Rutherford, Swain, Transylvania, Union, Watauga, Wilkes and Yancey. It has jurisdiction over the cities of Asheville, Charlotte, Hickory, and Statesville.

The United States Attorney's Office for the Western District of North Carolina represents the United States in civil and criminal litigation in the court. As of March 3, 2025 the United States attorney is Russ Ferguson.

== History ==
The United States District Court for the District of North Carolina was established on June 4, 1790, by 1 Stat. 126. On June 9, 1794, it was subdivided into three districts by 1 Stat. 395, but on March 3, 1797, the three districts were abolished and the single District restored by 1 Stat. 517, until April 29, 1802, when the state was again subdivided into three different districts by 2 Stat. 156.

In both instances, these districts, unlike those with geographic designations that existed in other states, were titled by the names of the cities in which the courts sat. After the first division, they were styled the District of Edenton, the District of New Bern, and the District of Wilmington; after the second division, they were styled the District of Albemarle, the District of Cape Fear, and the District of Pamptico. However, in both instances, only one judge was authorized to serve all three districts, causing them to effectively operate as a single district. The latter combination was occasionally referred to by the cumbersome title of the United States District Court for the Albemarle, Cape Fear & Pamptico Districts of North Carolina.

On June 4, 1872, North Carolina was re-divided into two Districts, Eastern and Western, by 17 Stat. 215. The presiding judge of the District of North Carolina, George Washington Brooks, was then reassigned to preside over only the Eastern District, allowing President Ulysses S. Grant to appoint Robert P. Dick to be the first judge of the Western District of North Carolina. The Middle District was created from portions of the Eastern and Western Districts on March 2, 1927, by 44 Stat. 1339.

== Current judges ==
As of December 12, 2025:

#	Title	Judge	Duty station	Born	Term of service			Appointed by
#	Title	Judge	Duty station	Born	Active	Chief	Senior	Appointed by
18	Chief Judge	Martin Karl Reidinger	Asheville	1958	2007–present	2020–present	—	G.W. Bush
19	District Judge	Max O. Cogburn Jr.	Asheville	1951	2011–present	—	—	Obama
20	District Judge	Kenneth D. Bell	Charlotte	1958	2019–present	—	—	Trump
21	District Judge	Susan C. Rodriguez	Charlotte	1981	2025–present	—	—	Trump
22	District Judge	Matthew Orso	Charlotte	1978	2025–present	—	—	Trump
12	Senior Judge	Richard Lesley Voorhees	Charlotte	1941	1988–2017	1991–1998	2017–present	Reagan
13	Senior Judge	Graham Calder Mullen	Charlotte	1940	1990–2005	1998–2005	2005–present	G.H.W. Bush
17	Senior Judge	Frank DeArmon Whitney	Charlotte	1959	2006–2024	2013–2020	2024–present	G.W. Bush

== Former judges ==
#	Judge	Born–died	Active service	Chief Judge	Senior status	Appointed by	Reason for termination
1	Robert P. Dick	1823–1898	1872–1898	—	—	Grant	retirement
2	Hamilton G. Ewart	1849–1918	1898–1899 (Note: Recess appointment; the United States Senate later rejected the appointment.); 1899–1900 (Note: Received a second recess appointment and was again rejected by the Senate.)	—	—	McKinley; McKinley	not confirmed not confirmed
3	James Edmund Boyd	1845–1935	1900–1935 (Note: Recess appointment; formally nominated on December 15, 1900, confirmed by the Senate on January 9, 1901, and received commission the same day.)	—	—	McKinley	death
4	Edwin Y. Webb	1872–1955	1919–1948	—	1948–1955	Wilson	death
5	David Ezekiel Henderson	1879–1968	1948–1949 (Note: Recess appointment; resigned prior to consideration by the Senate.)	—	—	Truman	resignation
6	Wilson Warlick	1892–1978	1949–1968	1961–1962; 1966–1968	1968–1978	Truman	death
7	James Braxton Craven Jr.	1918–1977	1961–1966	1962–1966	—	Kennedy	elevation
8	Woodrow W. Jones	1914–2002	1967–1985	1968–1984	1985–2002	L. Johnson	death
9	James Bryan McMillan	1916–1995	1968–1989	—	1989–1995	L. Johnson	death
10	Robert Daniel Potter	1923–2009	1981–1994	1984–1991	1994–2009	Reagan	death
11	David B. Sentelle	1943–present	1985–1987	—	—	Reagan	elevation
14	Lacy Thornburg	1929–present	1995–2009	—	—	Clinton	retirement
15	Harold Brent McKnight	1952–2004	2003–2004	—	—	G.W. Bush	death
16	Robert J. Conrad	1958–present	2005–2023	2006–2013	2023–2025	G.W. Bush	retirement

== Chief judges ==
Chief judges have administrative responsibilities with respect to their district court. Unlike the Supreme Court, where one justice is specifically nominated to be chief, the office of chief judge rotates among the district court judges. To be chief, a judge must have been in active service on the court for at least one year, be under the age of 65, and have not previously served as chief judge.

A vacancy is filled by the judge highest in seniority among the group of qualified judges. The chief judge serves for a term of seven years, or until age 70, whichever occurs first. The age restrictions are waived if no members of the court would otherwise be qualified for the position.

When the office was created in 1948, the chief judge was the longest-serving judge who had not elected to retire, on what has since 1958 been known as senior status, or declined to serve as chief judge. After August 6, 1959, judges could not become or remain chief after turning 70 years old. The current rules have been in operation since October 1, 1982.

== Succession of seats ==
Seat 1
Seat established on June 4, 1872 by 17 Stat. 215
Dick	1872–1898
Ewart	1898–1899
Ewart	1899–1900
Boyd	1901–1935
Seat abolished on August 21, 1935 (temporary judgeship expired)

Seat 2
Seat established on November 5, 1919 pursuant to 40 Stat. 1156 (temporary)
Seat became permanent upon the abolition of Seat 1 on August 21, 1935
Webb	1919–1948
Henderson	1948–1949
Warlick	1949–1968
McMillan	1968–1989
Mullen	1990–2005
Reidinger	2007–present

Seat 3
Seat established on May 19, 1961 pursuant to 75 Stat. 80
Craven, Jr.	1961–1966
Jones	1967–1985
Sentelle	1985–1987
Voorhees	1988–2017
Bell	2019–present

Seat 4
Seat established on October 20, 1978 pursuant to 92 Stat. 1629
Potter	1981–1994
Thornburg	1995–2009
Cogburn, Jr.	2011–present

Seat 5
Seat established on November 2, 2002 pursuant to 116 Stat. 1758
McKnight	2003–2004
Whitney	2006–2024
Rodriguez	2025–present

Seat 6
Seat established on November 2, 2002 pursuant to 116 Stat. 1758 (temporary)
Conrad, Jr.	2005–2023
Seat made permanent on December 23, 2024 by 138 Stat. 2693
Orso	2025–present

== U.S. attorneys for the Western District ==
The Western and Eastern districts were created in 1872. D. H. Starbuck, who was serving as U.S. Attorney for the entire state, continued in office by serving as Attorney for the Western District.

- D. H. Starbuck (1870–1876)
- Virgil S. Lusk (1876–1880)
- James E. Boyd (1880–1885)
- Hamilton C. Jones Jr. (1885–1889)
- Charles Price (1889–1893)
- Robert B. Glenn (1893–1897)
- Alfred E. Holton (1897–1914)
- William C. Hammer (1914–1920)
- Stonewall J. Durham (1920–1921)
- Frank A. Linney (1921–1927)
- Thomas J. Harkins (1927–1931)
- Charles A. Jonas (1931–1932)
- Frank Caldwell Patton (1932–1933)
- Marcus Erwin (1933–1939)
- W. Roy Francis (1939–1940)
- Theron L. Caudle (1940–1945)
- David E. Henderson (1945–1948)
- Thomas E. Uzzell (1948–1953)
- James M. Baley Jr. (1953–1961)
- Hugh E. Monteith (1961)
- William Medford (1961–1969)
- James O. Israel Jr. (1969)
- Keith S. Snyder (1969–1977)
- Harold M. Edwards (1977–1981)
- Harold J. Bender (1981)
- Charles R. Brewer (1981–1987)
- Thomas J. Ashcraft (1987–1993)
- Jerry W. Miller (1993)
- Mark T. Calloway (1994–2001)
- Robert J. Conrad Jr. (2001–2004)
- Gretchen Shappert (2004–2009)
- Edward R. Ryan (acting; 2009–2010)
- Anne Tompkins (2010–2015)
- Jill Westmoreland Rose (2015–2017)
- R. Andrew Murray (2017–2021)
- Dena J. King (2021–2025)
- Russ Ferguson (2025-)

== See also ==
- Courts of North Carolina
- List of current United States district judges
- List of United States federal courthouses in North Carolina
