= List of African American jurists =

This list includes individuals self-identified as African Americans who have made prominent contributions to the field of law in the United States, especially as eminent judges or legal scholars. Individuals who may have obtained law degrees or practiced law, but whose reasons for notability are not closely related to that profession, are generally not listed here.

== Attorneys and legal scholars ==
| Name | Historical significance |
|---|---|
| Violette Neatley Anderson (1882–1937) | First African-American woman to practice law before the United States Supreme Court on January 29, 1926 |
| Dennis Archer (b. 1942) | First African American president of the American Bar Association; former mayor of Detroit |
| Derrick Bell (1930–2011) | Proponent of critical race theory; law professor at Harvard University |
| Stephen L. Carter (b. 1954) | William Nelson Cromwell Professor of Law at Yale Law School |
| Johnnie Cochran (1937–2005) | Prominent defense attorney |
| Christopher Darden (b. 1956) | Associate District Attorney of Los Angeles who gained fame as a prosecutor in the O. J. Simpson trial |
| Marian Wright Edelman (b. 1939) | Founder of the Children's Defense Fund |
| Lani Guinier (1950–2022) | Voting rights scholar; first African American woman tenured by Harvard Law School |
| William Henry Harrison Hart (1857–1934) | Attorney who fought against Jim Crow laws |
| Barbara Jordan (1936–1996) | First African American Congresswoman from a southern state; while on House Judiciary Committee was influential in impeachment of Richard Nixon |
| Wade H. McCree (1920–1987) | Second African American (following Thurgood Marshall) to serve as Solicitor General of the United States |
| Barack Obama (b. 1961) | University of Chicago law professor, United States Senator, first African-American President of the Harvard Law Review, and 44th President of the United States of America |
| Ida Platt (1862–1939) | First African-American woman licensed to practice law in Illinois, and the third in the United States |
| Charlotte E. Ray (1850–1911) | First Black American female lawyer in the United States |
| Scovel Richardson (1912–1982) | Party to a housing desegregation case anticipating Shelley v. Kraemer; also a judge in federal courts from 1957 |
| Patricia J. Williams (b. 1951) | Proponent of critical race theory; law professor at Columbia University |
| William F. Yardley (1844–1924) | Anti-segregation advocate; first African American candidate for governor of Tennessee (1876) |

=== Others ===
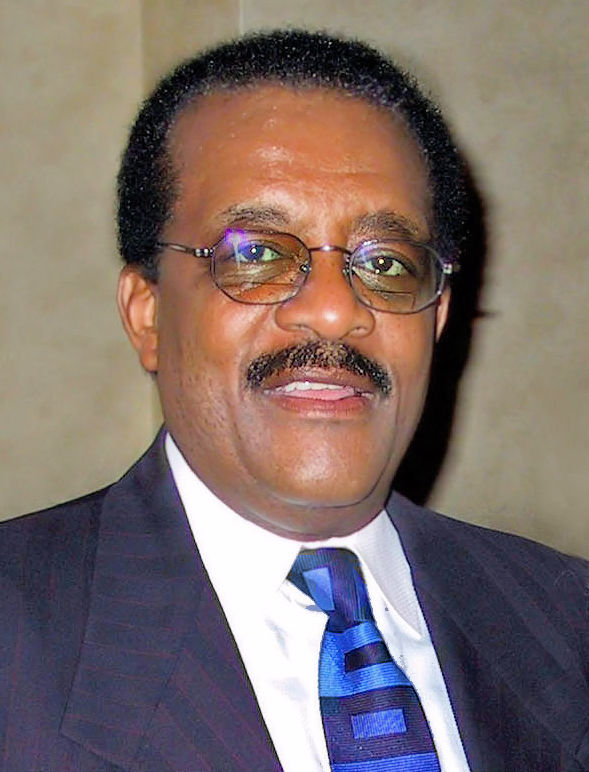
Johnnie Cochran

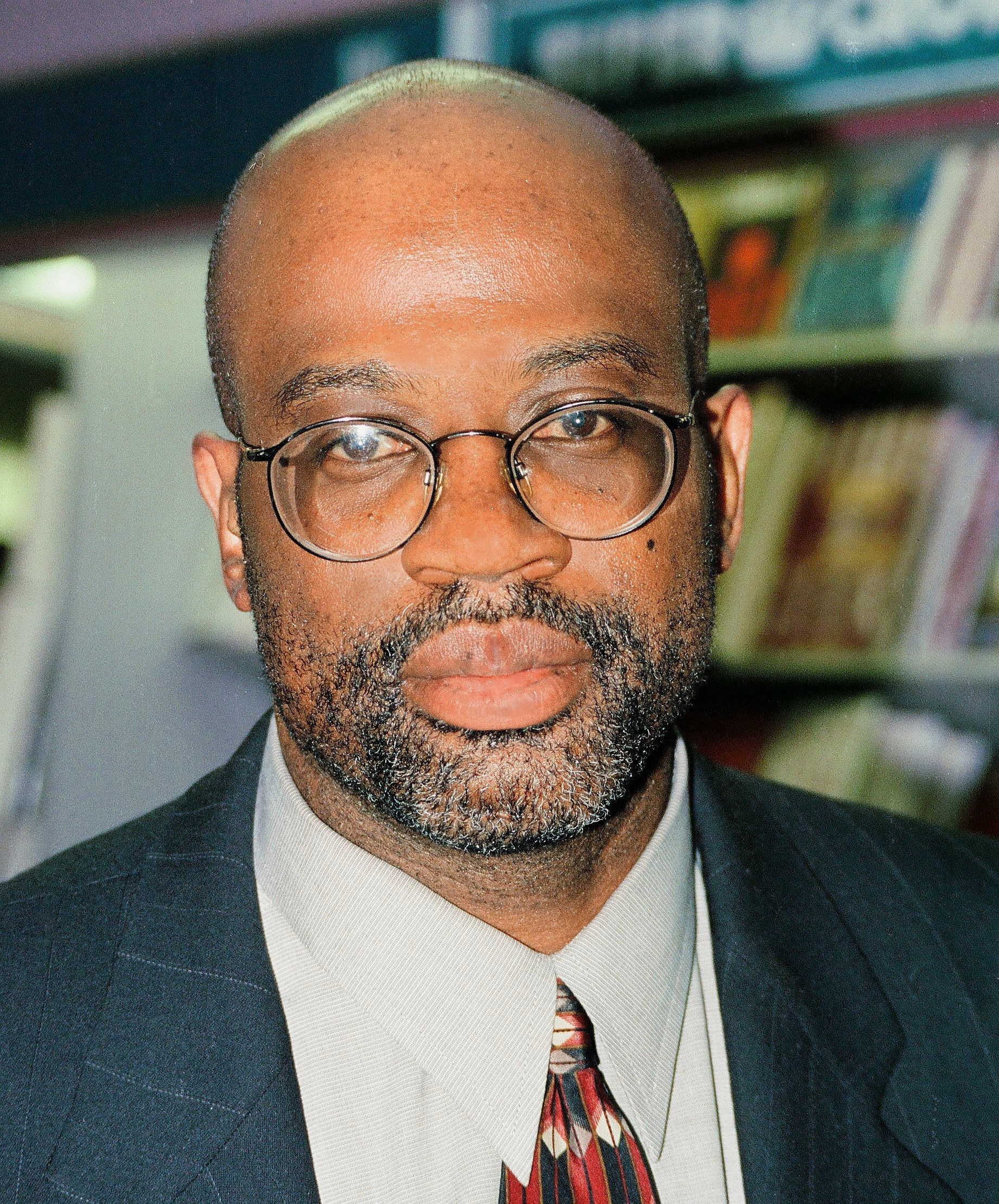
Christopher Darden

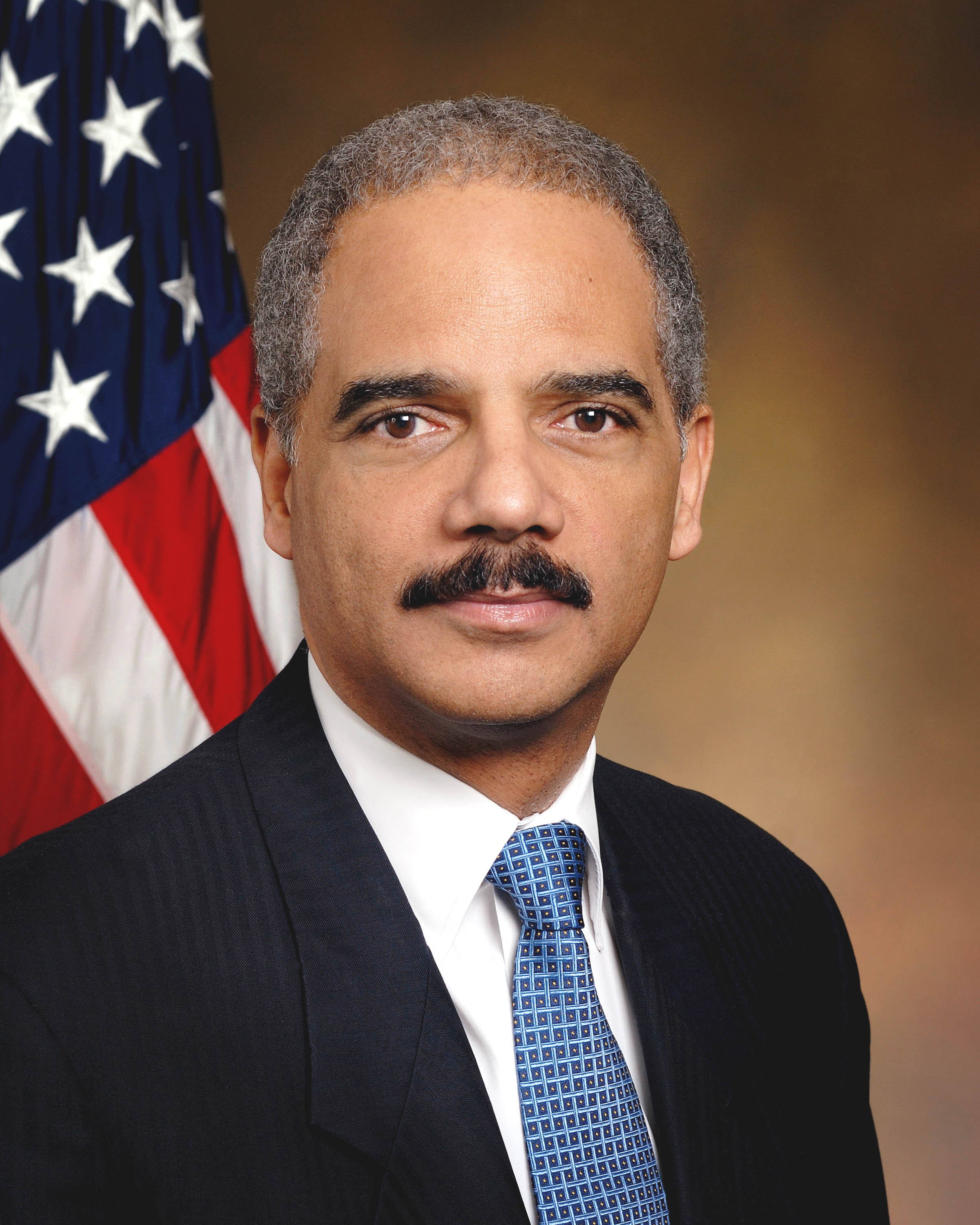
Eric Holder

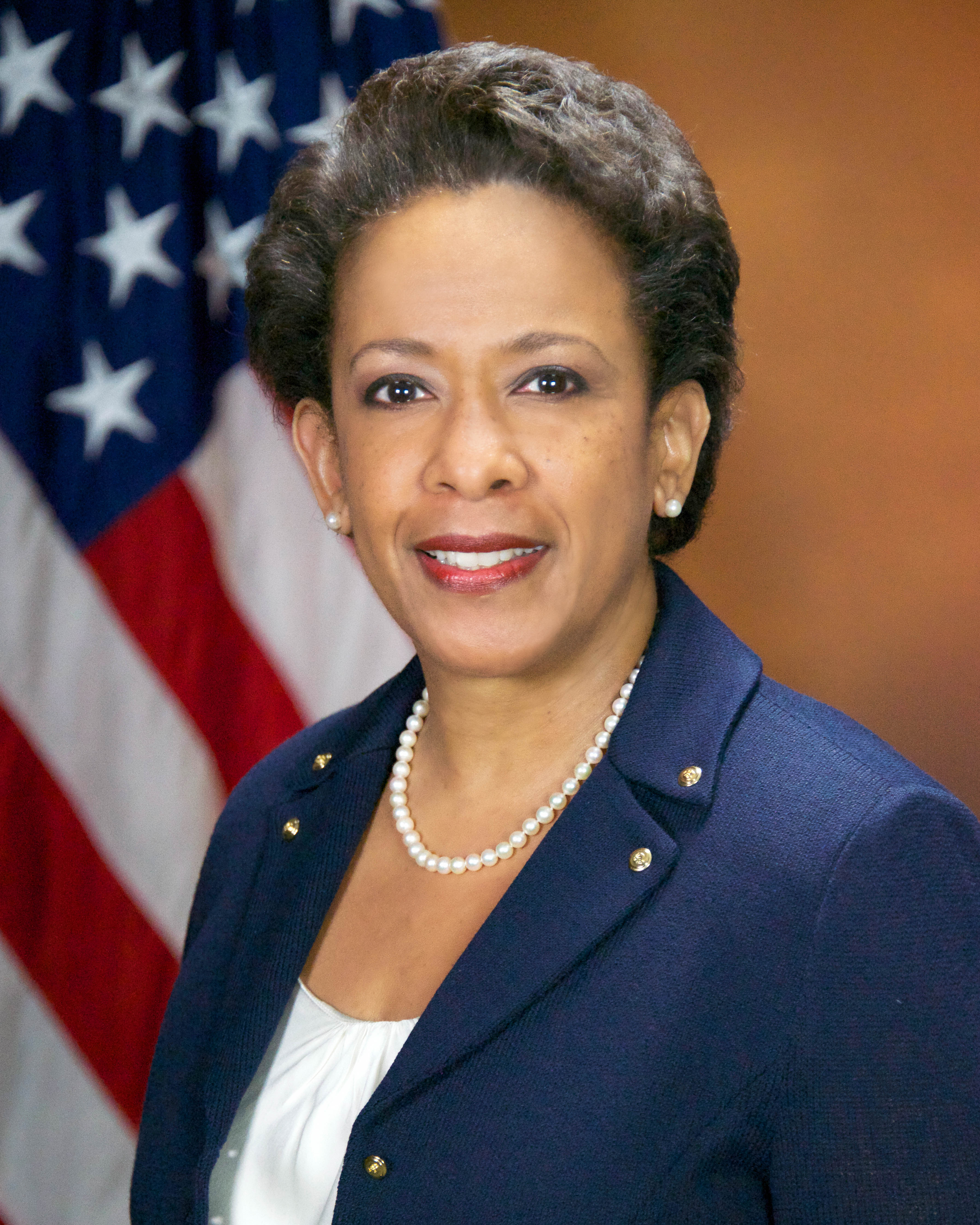
Loretta Lynch

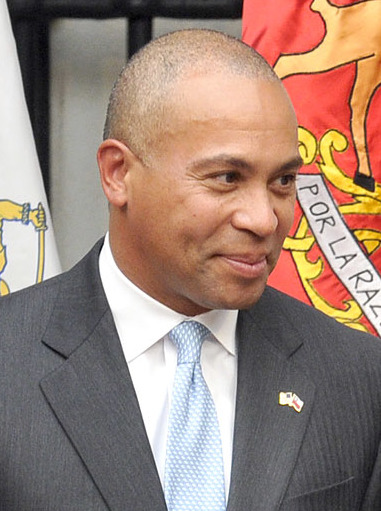
Deval Patrick

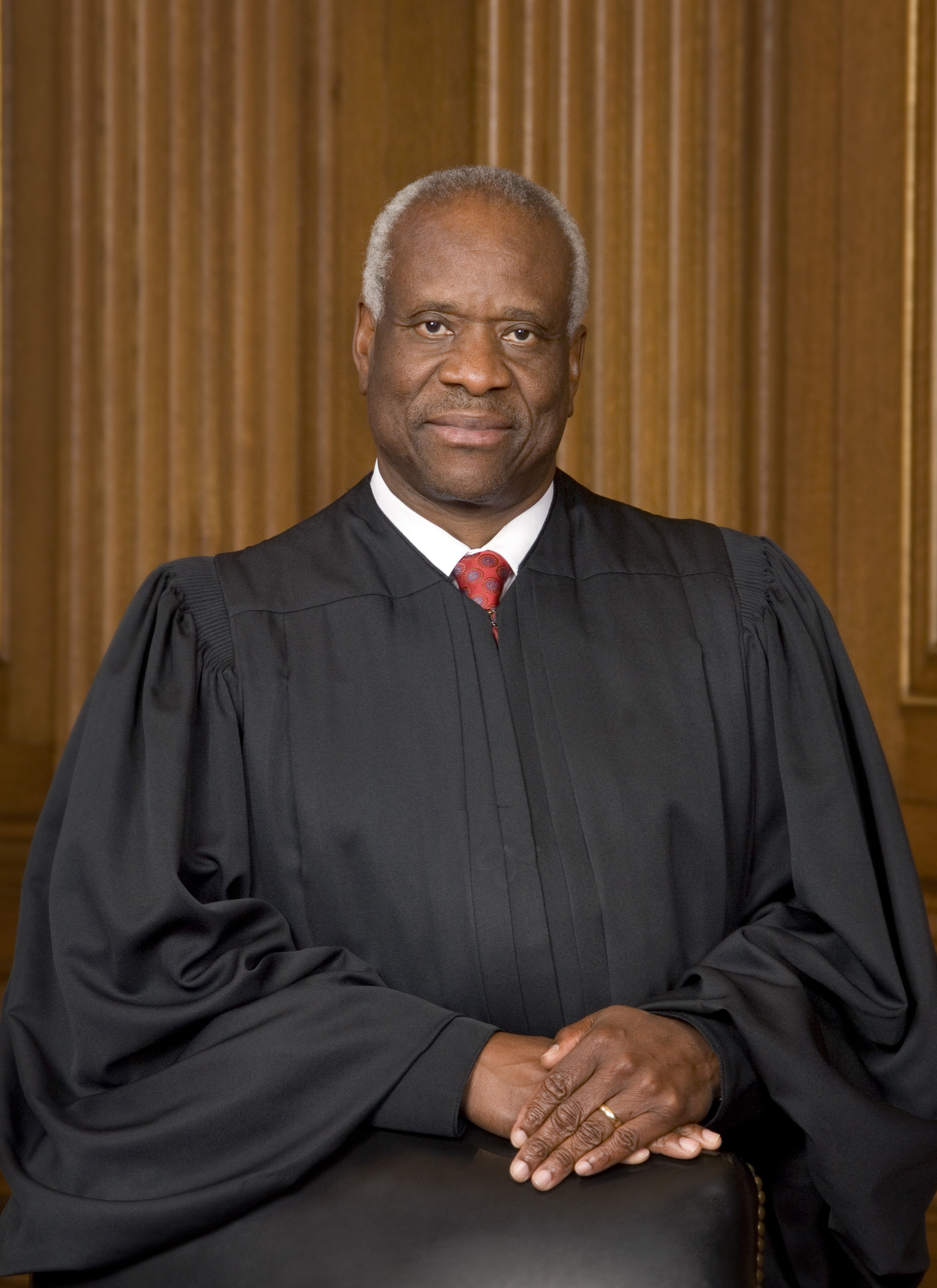
Clarence Thomas

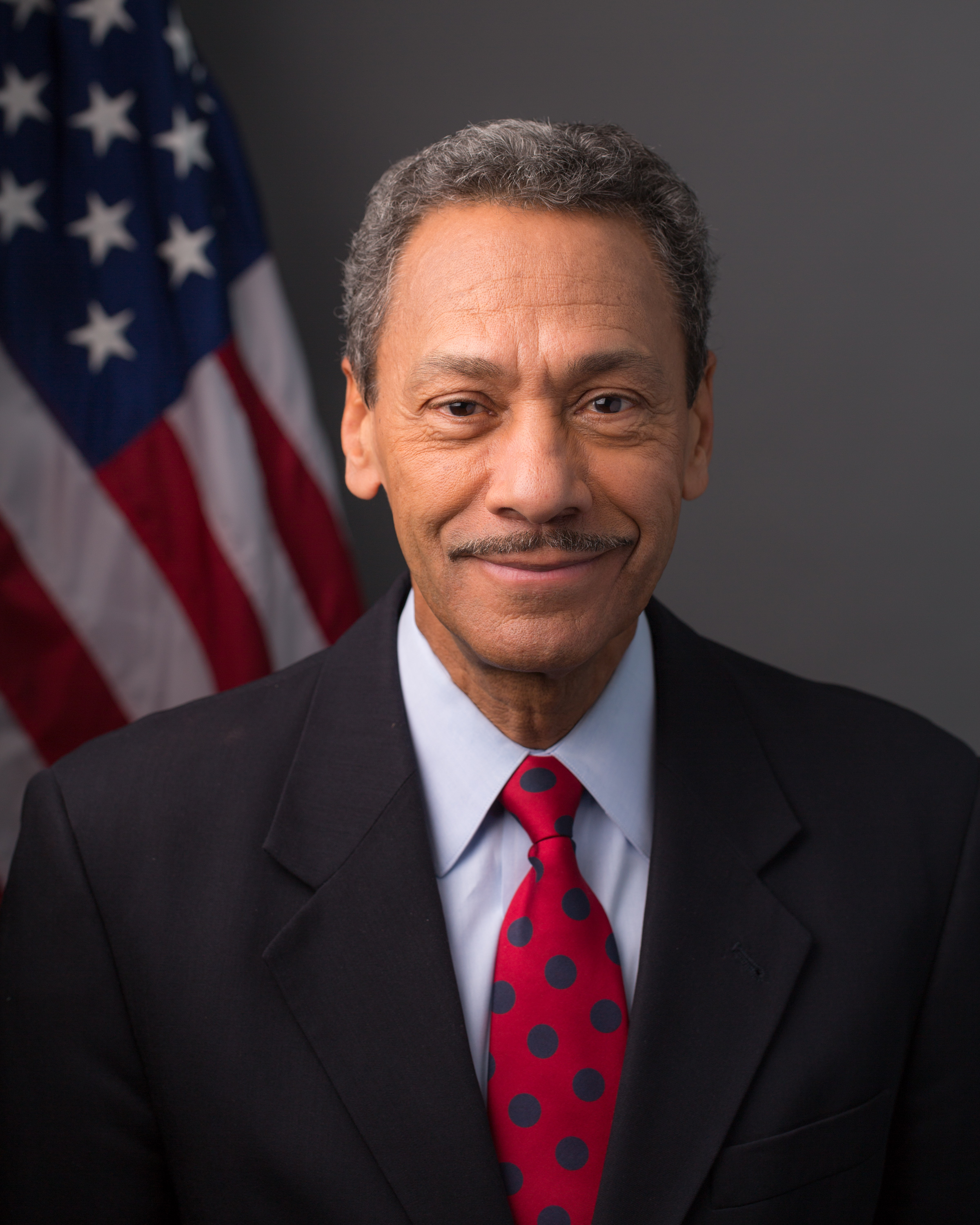
Mel Watt

- Robert Sengstacke Abbott, lawyer, newspaper publisher, editor
- Raymond Pace Alexander, lawyer, politician, civil rights activist
- Sadie Tanner Mossell Alexander, lawyer
- Anita L. Allen, lawyer, professor
- Helen Elsie Austin, lawyer
- Ferdinand Lee Barnett, lawyer, journalist
- Tom Bradley, lawyer, politician
- Roland Burris, lawyer, politician
- Eunice Carter, lawyer
- William Calvin Chase, lawyer, newspaper editor
- Julius L. Chambers, lawyer, civil rights activist, educator
- Laura Coates, attorney, law professor
- William Thaddeus Coleman Jr., lawyer, politician
- Mo Cowan, lawyer, politician
- Artur Davis, lawyer, politician
- Gordon Davis, lawyer
- James Dean, lawyer, activist, businessperson, deacon, first African-American appointed as a judge in Florida
- Elaine Denniston, lawyer, supported the Apollo program as a keypunch operator
- Carl E. Douglas, lawyer
- B. Kwaku Duren, lawyer, educator, writer, editor
- Larry Elder, lawyer, author, radio show host
- Keith Ellison, lawyer, politician
- Karen Freeman-Wilson, lawyer, judge
- Walter A. Gordon, lawyer
- Fred Gray, civil rights lawyer
- Al Green, lawyer, politician
- A. Leon Higginbotham Jr., lawyer, author, civil rights advocate, federal court judge
- Anita Hill, lawyer, academic
- Curtis Hill, lawyer, prosecutor
- Eric Holder, lawyer, 82nd United States Attorney General
- Sunny Hostin (African American father), lawyer
- Benjamin Hooks, lawyer, minister, civil rights activist
- Ketanji Brown Jackson, lawyer, judge, Associate Justice of the United States Supreme Court
- Valerie Jarrett, lawyer, businesswoman, government official
- Jeh Johnson, lawyer, government official
- Eddie Jordan, lawyer
- Vernon Jordan, lawyer, business executive, civil rights activist
- Florynce Kennedy, lawyer, civil rights advocate
- Leondra Kruger, lawyer
- Reginald Lewis, lawyer, businessman
- William H. Lewis, lawyer
- Lori Lightfoot, lawyer, politician
- Loretta Lynch, lawyer, 83rd United States Attorney General
- Conrad Lynn, lawyer, civil rights activist
- Thurgood Marshall, lawyer, judge, former Associate Justice of the United States Supreme Court
- Thurgood Marshall Jr., lawyer
- Robert Morris, lawyer
- Constance Baker Motley, lawyer, judge, politician, civil rights activist
- Pauli Murray, lawyer, author, priest, civil rights activist
- Ronald Noble, lawyer
- Deval Patrick, lawyer, author, businessman, politician
- Terri Sewell, lawyer, politician
- Bryan Stevenson, lawyer, professor
- Clarence Thomas, lawyer, judge, Associate Justice of the United States Supreme Court
- Jordan A. Thomas, lawyer, writer
- Larry Thompson, lawyer
- Samuel Wilbert Tucker, lawyer
- Mel Watt, lawyer, politician
- Tony West, lawyer

== Judicial officers ==
This is a dynamic list of African Americans who are or were judges, magistrate judges, court commissioners, or administrative law judges. If known, it will be listed if a judge has served on multiple courts.

| Judge | Court/agency and years of service (if known) | State/territory | Status | | | | |
|---|---|---|---|---|---|---|---|
| Sheila Abdus-Salaam | New York City Civil Court (1992–1993); New York Supreme Court (1993–2009); Appellate Division of the New York Supreme Court, First Judicial Department (2009–2013); New York Court of Appeals (2013–2017) | New York | deceased | | | | |
| Nancy Abudu | United States Court of Appeals for the Eleventh Circuit (2023– ) | Georgia | active | | | | |
| Henry Lee Adams Jr. | Fourth Judicial Circuit of Florida (1979–1993); United States District Court for the Middle District of Florida (1993– ) | Florida | active | | | | |
| Oscar W. Adams Jr. | Supreme Court of Alabama (1980–1993) | Alabama | deceased | | | | |
| Fritz W. Alexander II | New York Appellate Division, First Department (1982–1985) | New York | resigned | | | | |
| Raymond Pace Alexander | Pennsylvania Courts of Common Pleas (1959–1974) | Pennsylvania | deceased | | | | |
| Elreta Melton Alexander-Ralston | North Carolina District Court (appt. 1968) | North Carolina | deceased | | | | |
| Arenda Wright Allen | United States District Court for the Eastern District of Virginia (2011– ) | Virginia | active | | | | |
| Macon Bolling Allen | Justice of the Peace for Middlesex County (appt. 1848); Inferior Court of Charleston (appt. 1873); Charleston County Probate Court (appt. 1873) | Massachusetts | deceased | | | | |
| Christopher M. Alston | Bankruptcy Court, Western District of Washington (2015– ) | Washington | active | | | | |
| Rossie D. Alston Jr. | Court of Appeals of Virginia (2009–2019); United States District Court for the Eastern District of Virginia (2019– ) | Virginia | active | | | | |
| Eldora Anderson | Perry County Probate Court (2006– ) | Alabama | active | | | | |
| Percy Anderson | United States District Court for the Central District of California (2002– ) | California | active | | | | |
| Saundra Brown Armstrong | United States District Court for the Northern District of California (1991– ) | California | active | | | | |
| Israel "I.M." Augustine Jr. | Orleans Criminal District Court (1969) | Louisiana | deceased | | | | |
| Jacquelyn D. Austin | United States District Court for the District of South Carolina (2011– ) | South Carolina | active | | | | |
| Henry Autrey | United States District Court for the Eastern District of Missouri (2002– ) | Missouri | active | | | | |
| Dionne Phillips Bagsby | Tarrant County Commissioners Court (1978–2005) | Texas | deceased | | | | |
| Nannette A. Baker | Missouri Court of Appeals (2004–2009); United States District Court for the Eastern District of Missouri (2010–2023) | Missouri | retired | | | | |
| Cynthia Baldwin | Allegheny County Court of Common Pleas (1989–2005); Supreme Court of Pennsylvania (2006–2008) | Pennsylvania | retired | | | | |
| Shannon Baldwin | Harris County Court (2018– ) | Texas | active | | | | |
| Camara Banfield | Clark County Superior Court (2021– ) | Washington | active | | | | |
| Patricia Banks | Cook County 5th Subcircuit (1994–2018) | Illinois | retired | | | | |
| Boce W. Barlow Jr. | Connecticut Municipal Court (appt. 1957) | Connecticut | deceased | | | | |
| Randolph Baskerville | North Carolina 9B Judicial District (2005–2014) | North Carolina | retired | | | | |
| Gordon S. Baranco | Oakland-Piedmont-Emeryville Municipal Court (1980–1984); Alameda County Superior Court (1984–2016) | California | retired | | | | |
| Lucia Bates | Harris County Justice of the Peace Court (2019– ) | Texas | active | | | | |
| Deborah Batts | United States District Court for the Southern District of New York (1994–2020) | New York | deceased | | | | |
| DeLawrence Beard | Sixth Judicial Circuit Court (1996–2007) | Maryland | retired | | | | |
| Cheri Beasley | North Carolina Supreme Court (2012–2020) | North Carolina | term ended | | | | |
| James A. Beaty Jr. | United States District Court for the Middle District of North Carolina (1994–2018) | North Carolina | retired | | | | |
| Diana Becton | Contra Costa County Municipal Court (1995–1998); Contra Costa County Superior Court (1998–2017) | California | retired | | | | |
| Louis A. Bedford Jr. | Dallas Municipal Court (1966–1980) | Texas | deceased | | | | |
| Wendy Beetlestone | United States District Court for the Eastern District of Pennsylvania (2014– ) | Pennsylvania | active | | | | |
| Romonda Belcher-Ford | Polk County District Court (2010–2024) | Iowa | retired | | | | |
| Kathleen Bell | Arkansas First Judicial District (1989–2016) | Arkansas | retired | | | | |
| Robert M. Bell | Circuit Court for Baltimore City (1980–1984); Maryland Court of Special Appeals (1984–1991); Maryland Court of Appeals (1991–2013) | Maryland | retired | | | | |
| Te'iva Bell | Harris County 339th District Court (2021– ) | Texas | active | | | | |
| DeAndrea G. Benjamin | South Carolina Circuit Court (2011–2023); United States Court of Appeals for the Fourth Circuit (2023– ) | South Carolina | active | | | | |
| Alfred H. Bennett | United States District Court for the Southern District of Texas (2015– ) | Texas | active | | | | |
| L. Howard Bennett | Minneapolis Municipal Court (appt. 1957) | Minnesota | deceased | | | | |
| Gail B. Bereola | Alameda County Municipal Court (1992–1998); Alameda County Superior Court (1998– ) | California | active | | | | |
| Irene Berger | Kanawha County Circuit Court (1994–2009); United States District Court for the Southern District of West Virginia (2009– ) | West Virginia | active | | | | |
| Karen Bethea-Shields | North Carolina 14th District Court (1980–1986) | North Carolina | resigned | | | | |
| Deborah Biggers | Alabama Fifth Judicial Circuit (2014– ) | Alabama | active | | | | |
| Loretta Copeland Biggs | United States District Court for the Middle District of North Carolina (2014– ) | North Carolina | active | | | | |
| A. A. Birch Jr. | Tennessee Court of Appeals (1987–1990); Supreme Court of Tennessee (1990–2001) | Tennessee | deceased | | | | |
| Fannie Birckhead | Worcester County Orphans' Court (1998–2002) | Maryland | deceased | | | | |
| Kea S. Bird-Riley | 16th Circuit Court (2020– ) | Missouri | active | | | | |
| Andre Birotte Jr. | United States District Court for the Central District of California (2014– ) | California | active | | | | |
| Ollie B. Bivins Jr. | Flint Municipal Court (1969–1972); Genesee County Circuit Court (1972–1982) | Michigan | deceased | | | | |
| Charnelle Bjelkengren | Spokane County Superior Court (2019– ) | Washington | active | | | | |
| Stuart Black | Isabella County Probate Court (2018– ) | Michigan | active | | | | |
| Carolyn Wade Blackett | Shelby County Criminal Court (1994– ) | Tennessee | active | | | | |
| Jerry W. Blackwell | United States District Court for the District of Minnesota (2022– ) | Minnesota | active | | | | |
| Juanita Boger-Allen | Cabarrus County District Court (2019– ) | North Carolina | active | | | | |
| Kyra Harris Bolden | Michigan Supreme Court (2023– ) | Michigan | active | | | | |
| Victor Allen Bolden | United States District Court for the District of Connecticut (2014– ) | Connecticut | active | | | | |
| Jane Bolin | New York City Domestic Relations Court (1939–1978) | New York | deceased | | | | |
| Gia G. Bosley | Los Angeles County Superior Court (2017– ) | California | active | | | | |
| Richard F. Boulware | United States District Court for the District of Nevada (2014– ) | Nevada | active | | | | |
| Colin T. Bowen | Alameda County Superior Court (2018– ) | California | active | | | | |
| Robert Bowers | Solano County Superior Court (2003– ) | California | active | | | | |
| Amos E. Bowman | New York City Magistrates’ Court | New York | deceased | | | | |
| Susan Bragg | Oklahoma County District Court (1988–1999); Oklahoma Seventh District Court (1999–2005) | Oklahoma | deceased | | | | |
| Henry Bramwell | United States District Court for the Eastern District of New York (1974–2010) | New York | deceased | | | | |
| William McKinley Branch | Greene County Probate Court (appt. 1970) | Alabama | deceased | | | | |
| George Bridges | Nineteenth Judicial Circuit Court First Subcircuit (2012–2016) | Illinois | retired | | | | |
| Cristal C. Brisco | St. Joseph County Superior Court (2021–2024); United States District Court for the Northern District of Indiana (2024– ) | Indiana | active | | | | |
| Vernon S. Broderick | United States District Court for the Southern District of New York (2013– ) | New York | active | | | | |
| Margo Kitsy Brodie | United States District Court for the Eastern District of New York (2012– ) | New York | active | | | | |
| Alicia Brooks | North Carolina District Court (elect. 2014) | North Carolina | lost reelection | | | | |
| Claudette Brooks | Alameda County Superior Court (Referee: 1989–1997; Commissioner: 1997– ) | California | deceased | | | | |
| Allen Broussard | Supreme Court of California (1981–1991) | California | deceased | | | | |
| Aaron Brown Jr. | Portland Municipal Court (1968–1971); Multnomah County District Court (1971–1995) | Oregon | deceased | | | | |
| Ada E. Brown | Dallas County Criminal Court (2005–2007); Fifth Court of Appeals of Texas (2013–2019); United States District Court for the Northern District of Texas (2019– ) | Texas | active | | | | |
| Debra M. Brown | United States District Court for the Northern District of Mississippi (2013– ) | Mississippi | active | | | | |
| F. Keith Brown | Illinois 16th Judicial Circuit (1991–2014) | Illinois | retired | | | | |
| George H. Brown | Supreme Court of Tennessee (1980–1982) | Tennessee | lost reelection | | | | |
| Harry C. Brown | Jasper County Probate Court (appt. 1987–1997) | South Carolina | suspended | | | | |
| Homer S. Brown | Allegheny County Court (1949–1975) | Pennsylvania | deceased | | | | |
| Janice Rogers Brown | California Supreme Court (1996–2005); United States Court of Appeals for the D.C. Circuit (2005–2017) | Washington, D.C. | retired | | | | |
| Larry Brown Jr. | Alamance County District Court (2017– ) | North Carolina | active | | | | |
| Nannette Jolivette Brown | United States District Court for the Eastern District of Louisiana (2011– ) | Louisiana | active | | | | |
| Ronnisha Bowman | Harris County Criminal Court at Law No. 2 (2019– ) | Texas | active | | | | |
| Yvette McGee Brown | Franklin County Court of Common Pleas (1993–2002); Supreme Court of Ohio (2011–2012) | Ohio | term ended | | | | |
| Vanessa Lynne Bryant | United States District Court for the District of Connecticut (2007– ) | Connecticut | active | | | | |
| Wanda G. Bryant | North Carolina Court of Appeals (2001–2020) | North Carolina | retired | | | | |
| William B. Bryant | United States District Court for the District of Columbia (1965–1982) | Washington, D.C. | deceased | | | | |
| Frank Burgess | United States District Court for the Western District of Washington (1981–2010) | Washington, D.C. | deceased | | | | |
| Rhonda N. Burgess | Superior Court of Alameda County (Commissioner: 2003–2007; Judge: 2007– ) | California | active | | | | |
| Lillian W. Burke | Cleveland Municipal Court (1969–1987) | Ohio | deceased | | | | |
| Sharon M. Burney | Precinct 7, Place 2 in Harris County (2019– ) | Texas | active | | | | |
| Margaret Burnham | Boston Municipal Court (1977–1982) | Massachusetts | resigned | | | | |
| Garland E. Burrell Jr. | United States District Court for the Eastern District of California (1992– ) | California | inactive | | | | |
| Sharon V. Burrell | Circuit Court for Montgomery County (2008– ) | Maryland | active | | | | |
| Louis B. Butler | Wisconsin Circuit Court, Branch 9 (2002–2004); Wisconsin Supreme Court (2004–2008) | Wisconsin | term expired | | | | |
| Tjuana Byrd | Sixth Circuit Court (2021– ) | Arkansas | active | | | | |
| Rupert Byrdsong | Los Angeles County Superior Court (2014– ) | California | active | | | | |
| Chinhayi Cadet | San Mateo County Superior Court (2021– ) | California | active | | | | |
| Clyde S. Cahill Jr. | United States District Court for the Eastern District of Missouri (1980–2004) | Missouri | deceased | | | | |
| Victoria Marie Calvert | United States District Court for the Northern District of Georgia (2022– ) | Georgia | active | | | | |
| Gloria J. Cannon | Kern County Superior Court (2017– ) | California | active | | | | |
| Larry Card | Superior Court of Alaska (1993–2017) | Alaska | retired | | | | |
| Donine Carrington Martin | Charles County Circuit Court (2017– ) | Maryland | active | | | | |
| George Carroll | Contra Costa Municipal Court (1965–1982) | California | deceased | | | | |
| Andrew L. Carter Jr. | United States District Court for the Eastern District of New York (2011– ) | New York | active | | | | |
| Geoffrey N. Carter | Alameda County Municipal Court (1988–1998); Alameda County Superior Court (Commissioner: 1998–2013) | California | retired | | | | |
| Robert L. Carter | United States District Court for the Southern District of New York (1972–2012) | New York | deceased | | | | |
| Joan S. Cartwright | Alameda County Superior Court (1996–2014) | California | retired | | | | |
| Denise J. Casper | United States District Court for the District of Massachusetts (2010– ) | Massachusetts | active | | | | |
| Agnes Chappell | Birmingham Municipal Court (2002–2016); Alabama Tenth Judicial Circuit (2016– ) | Alabama | active | | | | |
| Carlos Chappelle | Tulsa County District Court (1995–2015) | Oklahoma | died in office | | | | |
| Dewayne Charleston | Waller County Justice of the Peace (2003–2009) | Texas | suspended | | | | |
| Sharon Chatman | Santa Clara County Superior Court (2000–2020) | California | retired | | | | |
| Benjamin J. Cheeks | United States District Court for the Southern District of California (2024– ) | California | active | | | | |
| Sammie Chess Jr. | North Carolina Superior Court (1971–2007) | North Carolina | deceased | | | | |
| Wentworth Cheswill | Rockingham County Justice of the Peace (1805–1817) | New Hampshire | deceased | | | | |
| J. Michelle Childs | United States District Court for the District of South Carolina (2010–2022); United States Court of Appeals for the District of Columbia Circuit (2022– ) | Washington, D.C. | active | | | | |
| Tanya S. Chutkan | United States District Court for the District of Columbia (2014– ) | Washington, D.C. | active | | | | |
| Crittenden Clark | St. Louis Justice of the Peace (appt. 1922) | Missouri | deceased | | | | |
| Darcel D. Clark | New York Appellate Division, First Department (2012–2015) | New York | resigned | | | | |
| Sidney Clark | Wilmington Municipal Court (1961–1966) | Delaware | resigned | | | | |
| Jessica G. L. Clarke | United States District Court for the Southern District of New York (2023– ) | New York | active | | | | |
| Sheria Clarke | United States District Court for the District of South Carolina (2026– ) | South Carolina | active | | | | |
| C. Don Clay | Alameda County Superior Court (2003– ) | California | active | | | | |
| Eric L. Clay | United States Court of Appeals for the Sixth Circuit (1997– ) | Michigan | active | | | | |
| Jason A. Clay | Alameda County Superior Court (2018– ) | California | active | | | | |
| Denise Clayton | Jefferson County District Court (1996–2007); Kentucky Court of Appeals (2007– 2023) | Kentucky | active | | | | |
| Franklin Cleckley | Supreme Court of Appeals of West Virginia (1994–1996) | West Virginia | resigned | | | | |
| U. W. Clemon | United States District Court for the Northern District of Alabama (1980–2009) | Alabama | retired | | | | |
| Charles N. Clevert Jr. | United States District Court for the Eastern District of Wisconsin (1996–2017) | Wisconsin | retired | | | | |
| Courtney Clyburn-Pope | South Carolina Second Judicial Circuit (2019– ) | South Carolina | active | | | | |
| Lewis W. Clymer | Common Pleas Court for the City of Detroit (1956–1957); Recorder's Court for the City of Detroit (1957–1977) | Missouri | deceased | | | | |
| David H. Coar | United States District Court for the Northern District of Illinois (1994–2010) | Illinois | retired | | | | |
| Ivory Cobb or Ivorey Cobb | Colebrook Superior Court (1968–1981) | New Hampshire | deceased | | | | |
| Jia M. Cobb | United States District Court for the District of Columbia (2021– ) | Washington, D.C. | active | | | | |
| E. Curtissa R. Cofield | New Britain District Superior Court (1991–2005) | Connecticut | retired | | | | |
| Dena M. Coggins | Sacramento County Superior Court (2021–2024); United States District Court for the Eastern District of California (2024– ) | California | active | | | | |
| Harry A. Cole | Supreme Bench of Baltimore City (1967–1977); Maryland Court of Appeals (1977–1991) | Maryland | deceased | | | | |
| R. Guy Cole Jr. | United States Court of Appeals for the Sixth Circuit (1995– ) | Ohio | active | | | | |
| Tom Colbert | Oklahoma Supreme Court (2004–2021) | Oklahoma | retired | | | | |
| J. Carlton “J.C.” Cole | North Carolina Superior Court (2009–2021) | North Carolina | retired | | | | |
| James H. Coleman Jr. | New Jersey Workers’ Compensation Court (1964–1972); Union County Court (1972–1977); New Jersey Superior Court (1978–1987); New Jersey Appellate Court (1987–1994); Supreme Court of New Jersey (1994–2003) | New Jersey | retired | | | | |
| Myrlys Stockdale Coleman | Napa County Superior Court (Commissioner: 2019–2020) Sacramento County Superior Court (Commissioner: 2020– ) | California | active | | | | |
| Sharon Johnson Coleman | United States District Court for the Northern District of Illinois (2010– ) | Illinois | active | | | | |
| Curtis Lynn Collier | United States District Court for the Eastern District of Tennessee (1995– ) | Tennessee | active | | | | |
| Audrey B. Collins | United States District Court for the Central District of California (1994–2014); California Second District Court of Appeal, Fourth Division (2014– ) | California | active | | | | |
| Raner Collins | Pima County Superior Court (Judge Pro Tem: 1985–1988; Judge: 1988–1998); United States District Court for the District of Arizona (1998–present) | Arizona | active | | | | |
| Robert Frederick Collins | United States District Court for the Eastern District of Louisiana (1978–1993) | Louisiana | resigned | | | | |
| Verda Colvin | Macon Judicial Circuit (2014–2020); Georgia Court of Appeals (2020–2021); Georgia Supreme Court (2021– ) | Georgia | active | | | | |
| Charles Swinger Conley | Macon County Court of Common Pleas (elec. 1972) | Alabama | deceased | | | | |
| C. Ellen Connally | Cleveland Municipal Court (1980–2004) | Ohio | deceased | | | | |
| Annette Cook | Office of Administrative Hearings | Washington | active | | | | |
| Julian A. Cook | United States District Court for the Eastern District of Michigan (1978–2017) | Michigan | deceased | | | | |
| Marcia G. Cooke | United States District Court for the Southern District of Florida (2004–2023) | Florida | deceased | | | | |
| Christopher R. Cooper | United States District Court for the District of Columbia (2014– ) | Washington, D.C. | active | | | | |
| Clarence Cooper | Georgia Court of Appeals (1990–1994); United States District Court for the Northern District of Georgia (1994– ) | Georgia | active | | | | |
| James P. Cooper III | Los Angeles County Superior Court (Commissioner: 2020– ) | California | active | | | | |
| LaDoris Cordell | Santa Clara Municipal Court (1982–1988) Santa Clara County Superior Court (1988–2011) | California | retired | | | | |
| Gerald Council | Vicinage 7 Superior Court (1998–2015) | New Jersey | suspended | | | | |
| Michelle Williams Court | Los Angeles County Superior Court (2012–2024); United States District Court for the Central District of California (2024– ) | California | active | | | | |
| Ronald K. Creighton | Contra Costa County Superior Court (Commissioner: 2004– ) | California | active | | | | |
| Waverly D. Crenshaw Jr. | United States District Court for the Middle District of Tennessee (2016– ) | Tennessee | active | | | | |
| Kato Crews | United States District Court for the District of Colorado (2018– ) | Colorado | active | | | | |
| Zina Pickens Cruse | Illinois 20th Judicial Circuit (2009– ) | Illinois | active | | | | |
| Raymond Dean Crutchley | Deschutes County Circuit Court (2018– ) | Oregon | active | | | | |
| Gordon Cuffy | Onondaga County Court (2017– ) | New York | active | | | | |
| Mark E. Cullers | Fresno County Superior Court (2015– ) | California | active | | | | |
| Taylor Culver | Alameda County Superior Court (Commissioner: 2005–2016) | California | resigned | | | | |
| Jeffrey Cummings | United States District Court for the Northern District of Illinois (2019– ) | Illinois | active | | | | |
| Tiffany P. Cunningham | United States Court of Appeals for the Federal Circuit (2021– ) | Washington, D.C. | active | | | | |
| Donald Cureton | North Carolina District Court (2011–2018) | North Carolina | lost reelection | | | | |
| Herbert Curtis | Ventura County Municipal Court (1984–1998); Ventura County Superior Court (1998–2007) | California | deceased | | | | |
| Angelita Dalton | Davidson County Criminal Court (2017– ) | Tennessee | active | | | | |
| Jeremy C. Daniel | United States District Court for the Northern District of Illinois (2023– ) | Illinois | active | | | | |
| Wiley Young Daniel | United States District Court for the District of Colorado (1995–2019) | Colorado | deceased | | | | |
| George B. Daniels | United States District Court for the Southern District of New York (2000– ) | New York | active | | | | |
| Hayzel Burton Daniels | Phoenix City Court (appt. 1965) | Arizona | deceased | | | | |
| Beverly Daniels-Greenberg | Alameda County Superior Court (Commissioner: 1996–2003; Judge: 2003–2012) | California | retired | | | | |
| June Berry Darensburg | Louisiana Twenty-Fourth Judicial District Court (2006– ) | Louisiana | active | | | | |
| Elvin L. Davenport | Jackson County Circuit Court (1970–1980) | Missouri | deceased | | | | |
| Horace A. Davenport | Montgomery County Court (1975–2003) | Pennsylvania | retired | | | | |
| John L. Davidson | San Diego Municipal Court (1994–2010) | California | retired | | | | |
| Andre M. Davis | United States District Court for the District of Maryland (1995–2009); United States Court of Appeals for the Fourth Circuit (2009–2017) | Maryland | retired | | | | |
| Brian J. Davis | United States District Court for the Middle District of Florida (2013– ) | Florida | active | | | | |
| Carlton G. Davis | Sacramento County Superior Court (Commissioner: 2017–2020; Judge 2020– ) | California | active | | | | |
| Dedra Davis | Harris County District Court (2019– ) | Texas | active | | | | |
| Legrome D. Davis | United States District Court for the Eastern District of Pennsylvania (2002– ) | Pennsylvania | inactive | | | | |
| Leland Davis III | San Mateo County Superior Court (2010– ) | California | active | | | | |
| Michael J. Davis | Hennepin County Municipal Court (1983–1984); Fourth Judicial District of Minnesota (1984–1994); United States District Court for the District of Minnesota (1994– ) | Minnesota | active | | | | |
| Stephanie D. Davis | United States District Court for the Eastern District of Michigan (2016–2022); United States Court of Appeals for the Sixth Circuit (2022– ) | Michigan | active | | | | |
| Terrye D. Davis | Solano County Superior Court (Judge Pro Tem: 2009–2014; Judge: 2019– ) | California | active | | | | |
| Theodore Z. Davis | Camden County Superior Court | New Jersey | deceased | | | | |
| Joseph Dawson III | United States District Court for the District of South Carolina (2020– ) | South Carolina | active | | | | |
| Charles Bernard Day | United States District Court for the District of Maryland (1997–2022) | Maryland | retired | | | | |
| James Dean | Monroe County Court (appt. 1888) | Florida | deceased | | | | |
| LaShann DeArcy Hall | United States District Court for the Eastern District of New York (2015– ) | New York | active | | | | |
| Leland G. Degrasse | New York Appellate Division, First Department (2008–2015) | New York | retired | | | | |
| Mercedes Deiz | Multnomah County Circuit Court (1972–1992) | Oregon | retired | | | | |
| Elisha Demerson | Potter County Court (Commissioner: 1980–1986; Judge: 1986–1990) | Texas | term ended | | | | |
| Thomas Dickens | New York State Supreme Court (ret. 1984) | New York | deceased | | | | |
| Ursula Jones Dickson | Alameda County Superior Court (2013– ) | California | active | | | | |
| Judith Nelson Dilday | Massachusetts Probate and Family Court Circuit (1993–2009) | Massachusetts | retired | | | | |
| William S. Diuguid | St. Louis Magistrates’ Court | Missouri | deceased | | | | |
| Bernice B. Donald | United States District Court for the Western District of Tennessee (1995–2011); United States Court of Appeals for the Sixth Circuit (2011–2023) | Tennessee | retired | | | | |
| Earnestine Hunt Dorse | Memphis City Court (1990–2019) | Tennessee | retired | | | | |
| Dana Douglas | United States District Court for the Eastern District of Louisiana (2019–2022); United States Court of Appeals for the Fifth Circuit (2022– ) | Louisiana | active | | | | |
| Michael L. Douglas | Supreme Court of Nevada (2004–2019) | Nevada | retired | | | | |
| Willard H. Douglas Jr. | Richmond Juvenile and Domestic Relations Court (appt. 1974) | Virginia | retired | | | | |
| Gershwin A. Drain | United States District Court for the Eastern District of Michigan (2012– ) | Michigan | active | | | | |
| Melissa R. DuBose | Rhode Island District Court (2019– ); United States District Court for the District of Rhode Island (2025– ) | Rhode Island | active | | | | |
| Allyson Kay Duncan | U.S. Court of Appeals for the Fourth Circuit (2003–2019) | Virginia | retired | | | | |
| Robert Morton Duncan | Supreme Court of Ohio (1969–1971); United States Court of Appeals for the Armed Forces (1971–1974); United States District Court for the Southern District of Ohio (1974–1985) | Ohio | decreased | | | | |
| Shauna Dunnings | 30th Circuit Court (2018– ) | Michigan | active | | | | |
| Linda Marie Dunson | Harris County District Court (2019– ) | Texas | active | | | | |
| Joseph E. Dyer | New York Domestic Relations Court | New York | deceased | | | | |
| Anita Earls | Supreme Court of North Carolina (2019– ) | North Carolina | active | | | | |
| George Edgecomb | Hillsborough County Court (1973–1976) | Florida | deceased | | | | |
| Harry T. Edwards | United States Court of Appeals for the District of Columbia Circuit (1980– ) | Washington, D.C. | active | | | | |
| Jerry Edwards Jr. | United States District Court for the Western District of Louisiana (2023– ) | Louisiana | active | | | | |
| Harry J. Elam | Boston Municipal Court | Massachusetts | deceased | | | | |
| Sara L. Ellis | United States District Court for the Northern District of Illinois (2013– ) | Illinois | active | | | | |
| Christina Elmore | 17th Circuit Court (2019– ) | Michigan | active | | | | |
| Morrison C. England Jr. | United States District Court for the Eastern District of California (2002–2024) | California | retired | | | | |
| Richard Erwin | United States District Court for the Middle District of North Carolina (1980–2006) | North Carolina | deceased | | | | |
| Stacy Boulware Eurie | Sacramento County Superior Court (2007–2022) Third District Court of Appeal (2022– ) | California | active | | | | |
| Kelli Evans | California Supreme Court (2023– ) | California | active | | | | |
| Stephen Everett | Florida Second Judicial Circuit (2019– ) | Florida | active | | | | |
| Charles S. Farmer | Detroit Common Pleas Court (1961–1965); Wayne County Circuit Court (elec. 1965) | Michigan | deceased | | | | |
| Walter M. Farmer | St. Louis Municipal Court | Missouri | deceased | | | | |
| Charlye O. Farris | Special Wichita County Court (appt. 1954); Texas 78th District Court (1973) | Texas | deceased | | | | |
| Joseph Jerome Farris | United States Court of Appeals for the Ninth Circuit (1979–2020) | Washington | deceased | | | | |
| Henry C. Ferguson | Chicago Municipal Court (elec. 1951) | Illinois | deceased | | | | |
| Marshall Ferguson | King County Superior Court (2018– ) | Washington | active | | | | |
| Wilkie D. Ferguson | Florida Industrial Claims Court (1973–1977); 11th Judicial Circuit Court of Florida (1977–1981); Florida Third District Court of Appeal (1980–1993); United States District Court for the Southern District of Florida (1993–2003) | Florida | deceased | | | | |
| Arthur S. Fickling | District of Columbia Court of Appeals (1968–1977) | Washington, D.C. | deceased | | | | |
| Bernard R. Fielding Sr. | Charleston County Probate Court (1976–1995) | South Carolina | lost reelection | | | | |
| Richard Fields | Riverside County Superior Court (Commissioner: 1991–2000; Judge: 2000–2017); California Fourth Appellate District (2017– ) | California | active | | | | |
| Richard E. Fields | Charleston Municipal Court (1969–1980); South Carolina Circuit Court (1980–1992) | South Carolina | retired | | | | |
| Kelvin D. Filer | Los Angeles Municipal Court (Commissioner: 1993–2002); Los Angeles County Superior Court (2002– ) | California | active | | | | |
| Toria J. Finch | Harris County Criminal Court at Law No. 9 (2019– ) | Texas | active | | | | |
| Ernest A. Finney Jr. | Supreme Court of South Carolina (1985–2000) | South Carolina | retired | | | | |
| Arthur O. Fisher | Dayton Municipal Court (1961–1970); Montgomery County Common Pleas Court (Domestic Relations) (elec. 1970) | Ohio | deceased | | | | |
| Judith D. Ford | Alameda County Municipal Court (1982–1998); Alameda County Superior Court (1998–2002) | California | retired | | | | |
| Arthur Fisher | Dayton Municipal Court (1961–1970); Montgomery County Common Pleas Court (1970–1994) | Ohio | deceased | | | | |
| Lewis S. Flagg Jr. | Brooklyn Municipal Court (elect. 1953) | New York | deceased | | | | |
| James C. Flanigan | Denver District Court (elec. 1964) | Colorado | deceased | | | | |
| Charles E. Fleming | United States District Court for the Northern District of Ohio (2022– ) | Ohio | active | | | | |
| Andrea Flint | Santa Clara County Superior Court (2010– ) | California | active | | | | |
| Marquette Floyd | Suffolk District Court (1969–1989); Supreme Court of New York (appt. 1989) | New York | retired | | | | |
| Maurice B. Foley | United States Tax Court (1995–2010); (2011– ) | Washington, D.C. | active | | | | |
| Geraldine Bledsoe Ford | Michigan Recorder's Court (1966–1998) | Michigan | deceased | | | | |
| John Thomas Fowlkes Jr. | United States District Court for the Western District of Tennessee (2012– ) | Tennessee | active | | | | |
| Ramona Franklin | Harris County District Court (2019– ) | Texas | active | | | | |
| Robert V. Franklin Jr. | Toledo Municipal Court (appt. 1960); Lucas County Common Pleas Court (appt. 1968) | Ohio | deceased | | | | |
| Maame Ewusi-Mensah Frimpong | Los Angeles County Superior Court (2015–2021); United States District Court for the Central District of California (2021– ) | California | active | | | | |
| Shannon Frison | Massachusetts Superior Court (2013– ) | Massachusetts | active | | | | |
| Arianna J. Freeman | United States Court of Appeals for the Third Circuit (2022– ) | Pennsylvania | active | | | | |
| Charles E. Freeman | Cook County Circuit Court (1976–1986); Illinois Supreme Court (1990–2018) | Illinois | retired | | | | |
| Juanita Freeman | Minnesota Tenth Judicial District (2018– ) | Minnesota | active | | | | |
| Teneka Frost | Schenectady City Court (2018– ) | New York | active | | | | |
| Henry Frye | North Carolina Supreme Court (1983–2001) | North Carolina | term ended | | | | |
| Fernando J. Gaitan Jr. | United States District Court for the Western District of Missouri (1991– ) | Missouri | active | | | | |
| Leslie Abrams Gardner | United States District Court for the Middle District of Georgia (2014– ) | Georgia | active | | | | |
| Sherilyn Peace Garnett | Los Angeles County Superior Court (2014–2022); United States District Court for the Central District of California (2022– ) | California | active | | | | |
| Carla Garrett | Los Angeles County Superior Court (2020– ) | California | active | | | | |
| Ramona Garrett | Solano County Municipal Court (1992–1997); Solano County Superior Court (1997–2015) | California | retired | | | | |
| Darrin P. Gayles | United States District Court for the Southern District of Florida (2014– ) | Florida | active | | | | |
| John D. Geathers | South Carolina Court of Appeals (2008– ) | South Carolina | active | | | | |
| Albert B. George | Illinois Municipal Courts (elec. 1924) | Illinois | deceased | | | | |
| Mifflin Wistar Gibbs | Little Rock Police Court (1873–1875) | Arkansas | deceased | | | | |
| Benjamin F. Gibson | United States District Court for the Western District of Michigan (1979–1999) | Michigan | retired | | | | |
| James T. Giles | United States District Court for the Eastern District of Pennsylvania (1979–2008) | Pennsylvania | retired | | | | |
| Patricia Tolliver Giles | United States District Court for the Eastern District of Virginia (2021– ) | Virginia | active | | | | |
| Earl Ben Gilliam | San Diego Municipal Court (1963–1975); San Diego County Superior Court (1975–1980); United States District Court for the Southern District of California (1980–2001) | California | deceased | | | | |
| Haywood Gilliam | United States District Court for the Northern District of California (2014– ) | California | active | | | | |
| Vanessa Gilmore | United States District Court for the Southern District of Texas (1994–2022) | Texas | retired | | | | |
| Walter H. Gladwin | Bronx Criminal Court | New York | deceased | | | | |
| Luther T. Glanton Jr. | Des Moines Municipal Court (1958–1973); Iowa District Court (1973–1985) | Iowa | retired | | | | |
| Robert D. Glass | Waterbury Superior Court (1978–1987); Supreme Court of Connecticut (1987–1992) | Connecticut | deceased | | | | |
| Carmen Julia Lynn Goodman | Illinois Twelfth Circuit Court (2007– ) | Illinois | active | | | | |
| Edward Gourdin | Roxbury District Court (1951–1958); Massachusetts Superior Court (1958–1966) | Massachusetts | deceased | | | | |
| Donald L. Graham | United States District Court for the Southern District of Florida (1991– ) | Florida | active | | | | |
| Cy A. Grant Sr. | North Carolina District 6B Court (appt. 1989) | North Carolina | active | | | | |
| James E. Graves Jr. | Mississippi Supreme Court (2001–2011); United States Court of Appeals for the Fifth Circuit (2011– ) | Mississippi | active | | | | |
| Angela Graves-Harrington | 246th District Court, Harris County (2019– ) | Texas | active | | | | |
| Shauna Graves-Robertson | Salt Lake County Justice Court (1990– ) | Utah | active | | | | |
| Lori Chambers Gray | Texas 262nd District Court (2019– ) | Texas | active | | | | |
| Clifford Scott Green | Court of Common Pleas of Philadelphia County (1964–1971); United States District Court for the Eastern District of Pennsylvania (1971–2007) | Pennsylvania | deceased | | | | |
| Nathaniel Green Jr. | King County District Court (2011– ) | Washington | active | | | | |
| Samuel L. Green | Buffalo City Court (1973–1978); Supreme Court of New York (1978–2016) | New York | retired | | | | |
| Joseph A. Greenaway Jr. | United States District Court for the District of New Jersey (1996–2010); United States Court of Appeals for the Third Circuit (2010–2023) | New Jersey | retired | | | | |
| Clayton Greene Jr. | Maryland Court of Appeals (2004–2019) | Maryland | retired | | | | |
| George Greene | Wake County Court (1974–1995) | North Carolina | deceased | | | | |
| Roger Gregory | United States Court of Appeals for the Fourth Circuit (2000– ) | Virginia | active | | | | |
| Jonathan J. C. Grey | United States District Court for the Eastern District of Michigan (2021– ) | Michigan | active | | | | |
| Maurice W. Grey | New York City Magistrates' Court | New York | deceased | | | | |
| Thomas L. Griffith | Los Angeles Municipal Court (1953–1968); Los Angeles Superior Court (1968–1972) | California | deceased | | | | |
| Lydia Kay Griggsby | United States Court of Federal Claims (2014–2021); United States District Court for the District of Maryland (2021– ) | Maryland | active | | | | |
| Hubert Grimes | Florida 7th Judicial Circuit (1999–2013) | Florida | retired | | | | |
| Stephanie Grogan Jones | Solano County Superior Court (2019– ) | California | active | | | | |
| Pamela Gutierrez | Maricopa County Justice of the Peace (2003–2007) | Alabama | deceased | | | | |
| Addeliar Dell Guy | Nevada Eighth Judicial District Court (1975–1996) | Nevada | deceased | | | | |
| Ancer L. Haggerty | Multnomah County District Court (1989–1990); Multnomah County Circuit Court (1990–1993); United States District Court for the District of Oregon (1994–2009) | Oregon | retired | | | | |
| Amos T. Hall | Tulsa County District Court (1969–1971) | Oklahoma | deceased | | | | |
| Phyllis J. Hamilton | U.S. District Court for the Northern District of California (2001– ) | California | active | | | | |
| George C. Hanks Jr. | United States District Court for the Southern District of Texas (2015– ) | Texas | active | | | | |
| Brenda Harbin-Forte | Alameda County Municipal Court (1992–1998); Alameda County Superior Court (1998–2019) | California | retired | | | | |
| Eddie Hardaway Jr. | Alabama Seventeenth Judicial District (1995– ) | Alabama | active | | | | |
| Lisa White Hardwick | Missouri 16th Judicial Circuit (2000); Missouri Court of Appeals (2001– ) | Missouri | active | | | | |
| Richard Harewood | Superior Court of Cook County (c. 1960) | Illinois | deceased | | | | |
| John R. Hargrove Sr. | District Court of Maryland for Baltimore City (1968–1974); Supreme Bench of Baltimore City (1974–1984); United States District Court for the District of Maryland (1984–1997) | Maryland | deceased | | | | |
| Lubbie Harper Jr. | Connecticut Superior Court (1997–2005); Connecticut Appellate Court (2005–2011); Connecticut Supreme Court (2011–2012) | Connecticut | retired | | | | |
| Nathaniel R. Harper | Louisville Court (appt. 1888) | Kentucky | deceased | | | | |
| Kevin D. Harrell | 16th Judicial Circuit Court (2012– ) | Missouri | active | | | | |
| Jeffrey L. Harris | Iowa District Court (1997–2021) | Iowa | deceased | | | | |
| Jesse S. Harris | District Court of Tulsa County (ret. 2014) | Oklahoma | retired | | | | |
| John W. Harvey | St. Louis Court | Missouri | deceased | | | | |
| Leroy R. Hassell Sr. | Supreme Court of Virginia (1989–2011) | Virginia | deceased | | | | |
| William H. Hastie | United States District Court of the Virgin Islands (1937–1939); United States Court of Appeals for the Third Circuit (1949–1976) | United States Virgin Islands | deceased | | | | |
| Alcee Hastings | 17th Judicial Circuit Court of Florida (1977–1979); United States District Court for the Southern District of Florida (1979–1989) | Florida | impeached | | | | |
| Joseph W. Hatchett | Supreme Court of Florida (1975–1979); United States Court of Appeals for the Fifth Circuit (1979–1981); United States Court of Appeals for the Eleventh Circuit (1981–1999) | Florida | retired | | | | |
| Terry J. Hatter Jr. | Los Angeles Superior Court (1977–1980); United States District Court for the Central District of California (1980– ) | California | inactive | | | | |
| William Joseph Haynes Jr. | United States District Court for the Middle District of Tennessee (1984–2017) | Tennessee | retired | | | | |
| George J. Hazel | United States District Court for the District of Maryland (2014–2023) | Maryland | resigned | | | | |
| Harry Hazelwood | Newark Magistrates’ Court | New Jersey | deceased | | | | |
| Elliott Heard Jr. | Gloucester County Court (1984–1991) | New Jersey | deceased | | | | |
| Wanda Keyes Heard | Baltimore City Circuit Court, 8th Judicial Circuit (1999–2019) | Maryland | retired | | | | |
| Thelton Henderson | United States District Court for the Northern District of California (1980– ) | California | inactive | | | | |
| William J. Hibbler | Illinois Circuit Court, Cook County (1986–1999); United States District Court for the Northern District of Illinois (1999–2012) | Illinois | deceased | | | | |
| A. Leon Higginbotham Jr. | United States District Court for the Eastern District of Pennsylvania (1964–1977); United States Court of Appeals for the Third Circuit (1977–1991); United States Foreign Intelligence Surveillance Court of Review (1979–1986); United States Court of Appeals for the Third Circuit (1990–1993) | Pennsylvania | deceased | | | | |
| Paul B. Higginbotham | Madison Municipal Court (1992–1994); Dane County Superior Court (1994–2003); Wisconsin Court of Appeals (2003–2017) | Wisconsin | retired | | | | |
| Kellie Hill | Cobb County's Magistrate Court (2016–2020) Superior Court (2021– ) | Georgia | active | | | | |
| Geraldine Hines | Massachusetts Superior Court (2001–2013); Massachusetts Appeals Court (2013–2014); Massachusetts Supreme Judicial Court (2014–2017) | Massachusetts | retired | | | | |
| Kelley B. Hodge | United States District Court for the Eastern District of Pennsylvania (2022– ) | Pennsylvania | active | | | | |
| Lisa Holder White | Illinois Sixth Judcicial Circuit Court (2001–2013); Illinois Fourth District Appellate Court (2013–2022); Illinois Supreme Court (2022– ) | Illinois | active | | | | |
| Cassandra Y. Holleman | Harris County Criminal Court at Law Texas No. 12 (2019) | Texas | deceased | | | | |
| Jerome A. Holmes | United States Court of Appeals for the Tenth Circuit (2006– ) | Oklahoma | active | | | | |
| Sharon Holmes | Tulsa County District Court (2014– ) | Oklahoma | active | | | | |
| Charlene Honeywell | United States District Court for the Middle District of Florida (2009– ) | Florida | active | | | | |
| Denise Page Hood | United States District Court for the Eastern District of Michigan (1994– ) | Michigan | active | | | | |
| Benjamin Hooks | Shelby County Criminal Court (appt. 1965) | Tennessee | deceased | | | | |
| Jeffery P. Hopkins | United States District Court for the Southern District of Ohio (1997– ) | Ohio | active | | | | |
| Odell Horton | United States District Court for the Western District of Tennessee (1980–2006) | Tennessee | deceased | | | | |
| Michele D. Hotten | Maryland Court of Special Appeals (2010–2015); Maryland Court of Appeals (2015–2024) | Maryland | retired | | | | |
| John A. Houston | United States District Court for the Southern District of California (2003– ) | California | active | | | | |
| Andrew J. Howard | District of Columbia Municipal Court | Washington, D.C. | deceased | | | | |
| George Howard Jr. | Arkansas Supreme Court (1977–1979); Arkansas Court of Appeals (1977–1980); United States District Court for the Western District of Arkansas (1980–1990); United States District Court for the Eastern District of Arkansas (1980–2007) | Arkansas | deceased | | | | |
| John A. Howard | Elyria Municipal Court (1985–1998) | Ohio | retired | | | | |
| Joseph C. Howard Sr. | Supreme Bench of Baltimore City (1968–1979); United States District Court for the District of Maryland (1991–2000) | Maryland | deceased | | | | |
| Karen Aileen Howze | Superior Court of the District of Columbia (Magistrate Judge: appt. 2002) | Washington, D.C. | retired | | | | |
| Kenneth M. Hoyt | United States District Court for the Southern District of Texas (1988– ) | Texas | active | | | | |
| Mabel H. Hubbard | District Court of Maryland for Baltimore City (1981–1985); Circuit Court for Baltimore City (1985–1999) | Maryland | deceased | | | | |
| Natalie Hudson | Minnesota Court of Appeals (2002–2015); Minnesota Supreme Court (2015– ) | Minnesota | active | | | | |
| William Clarence Hueston Sr. | Gary Magistrate Court (appt. 1924) | Indiana | deceased | | | | |
| Rufus C. Huffman Sr. | Bullock County Probate Court (1976–1994) | Alabama | deceased | | | | |
| Norma S. Huggins | King County Superior Court (1983–2000) | Washington | retired | | | | |
| Erica Hughes | Harris County Criminal Court at Law No. 3 (2019– ) | Texas | active | | | | |
| John Hulett | Lowndes County Probate Court | Alabama | deceased | | | | |
| LaShonda A. Hunt | United States District Court for the Northern District of Illinois (2023– ) | Illinois | active | | | | |
| Clay E. Hunter | Canton Municipal Court | Ohio | deceased | | | | |
| Robert B. Hutson | Orange County Superior Court (1982–2010) | California | retired | | | | |
| Herbert J. Hutton | United States District Court for the Eastern District of Pennsylvania (1988–2007) | Pennsylvania | deceased | | | | |
| Todd D. Irby | Placer County Superior Court (Commissioner: 2017–2018; Judge 2018– ) | California | active | | | | |
| Roderick L. Ireland | Boston Juvenile Court (1977–1990); Massachusetts Court of Appeals (1990–1997); Massachusetts Supreme Judicial Court (1997–2014) | Massachusetts | retired | | | | |
| Earlean Isaac | Greene County Probate Court (1989–2016) | Alabama | resigned | | | | |
| Brian Anthony Jackson | United States District Court for the Middle District of Louisiana (2010– ) | Louisiana | active | | | | |
| Carol E. Jackson | United States District Court for the Eastern District of Missouri (1992–2017) | Missouri | retired | | | | |
| Harrison S. Jackson | New York City Court | New York | deceased | | | | |
| Ketanji Brown Jackson | United States District Court for the District of Columbia (2013–2021); United States Court of Appeals for the District of Columbia (2021–2022); Supreme Court of the United States (2022– ) | Washington, D.C. | active | | | | |
| Maria T. Jackson | 339th State District Court (2009–2019) | Texas | resigned to seek for another office | | | | |
| Perry B. Jackson | Cleveland Municipal Court (1942–1960); Cuyahoga County Common Pleas Court (1960–1973) | Ohio | decreased | | | | |
| Raymond Alvin Jackson | United States District Court for the Eastern District of Virginia (1993– ) | Virginia | active | | | | |
| Candace Jackson-Akiwumi | United States Court of Appeals for the Seventh Circuit (2021– ) | Illinois | active | | | | |
| George E. James | Beaver County Court (1998–2007) | Pennsylvania | retired | | | | |
| Andrew L. Jefferson Jr. | Harris County Family District Court (1970–1973); Texas 208th District Court (1973–1975) | Texas | deceased | | | | |
| Bernard Jefferson | California Second District Court of Appeal (1975–1980) | California | deceased | | | | |
| Deadra L. Jefferson | South Carolina Circuit Court (2001– ) | South Carolina | active | | | | |
| Edwin L. Jefferson | Los Angeles Municipal Court (1941–1949); Los Angeles Superior Court (1949–1961); California Second Appellate District (1961–1975) | California | deceased | | | | |
| Wallace B. Jefferson | Supreme Court of Texas (2001–2013) | Texas | resigned | | | | |
| Lindsay C. Jenkins | United States District Court for the Northern District of Illinois (2023– ) | Illinois | active | | | | |
| Martin Jenkins | Alameda County Municipal Court (1989–1992); Alameda County Superior Court (1992–1997); United States District Court—Northern (1997–2008); California First Appellate District (2008–2019); Supreme Court of California (appt. 2020) | California | active | | | | |
| Angela Jewell | New Mexico 2nd Judicial District Court (1996–2010) | New Mexico | retired | | | | |
| Tommy Jewell | Bernalillo County Metropolitan Court (1983–1991); New Mexico 2nd Judicial District Court (1991–2005) | New Mexico | retired | | | | |
| Z. Mae Jimison | Marion County Superior Court (1996–2002) | Indiana | deceased | | | | |
| Bernette Joshua Johnson | Louisiana Supreme Court (1994–2020) | Louisiana | retired | | | | |
| C. Anthony Johnson | General Sessions Criminal Court | Tennessee | deceased | | | | |
| Clifton Johnson (jurist) | North Carolina Court of Appeals (1982–1996) | North Carolina | deceased | | | | |
| Golden E. Johnson | Newark Municipal Court (appt. 1974); Montclair Municipal Court | New Jersey | deceased | | | | |
| Joseph D. Johnson | Kansas Third Judicial District (2005–2018) | Kansas | deceased | | | | |
| Norma Holloway Johnson | United States District Court for the District of Columbia (1980–2003) | Washington, D.C. | retired | | | | |
| Shanice Johnson | Sixth Circuit Court (2021– ) | Arkansas | active | | | | |
| Sterling Johnson Jr. | United States District Court for the Eastern District of New York (1991–2022) | New York | deceased | | | | |
| Tiffany R. Johnson | United States District Court for the Northern District of Georgia (2025– ) | Georgia | designate | | | | |
| Alesia Jones | Solano County Superior Court (2008– ) | California | active | | | | |
| Bernard M. Jones | United States District Court for the Western District of Oklahoma (2015– ) | Oklahoma | active | | | | |
| C. Darnell Jones II | First Judicial District of Pennsylvania (1987–2008); United States District Court for the Eastern District of Pennsylvania (2008– ) | Pennsylvania | active | | | | |
| Charles W. Jones | Detroit Recorder's Court (appt. 1950) | Michigan | deceased | | | | |
| DaSean Jones | Harris County District Court (2019– ) | Texas | active | | | | |
| Gaynelle Griffin Jones | First Court of the Texas Courts of Appeals (1992–1993) | Texas | deceased | | | | |
| Jennifer L. Jones | Sedgwick County District Court (1992–2001); Wichita Municipal Court (2001– ) | Kansas | active | | | | |
| Joscelyn Jones | Alameda County Superior Court (2020– ) | California | active | | | | |
| Napoleon A. Jones Jr. | San Diego Municipal Court (1977–1982); San Diego County Superior Court (1982–1994); United States District Court for the Southern District of California (1994–2009) | California | deceased | | | | |
| Nathaniel R. Jones | United States Court of Appeals for the Sixth Circuit (1979–2002) | Ohio | retired | | | | |
| Okla Jones II | United States District Court for the Eastern District of Louisiana (1994–1996) | Louisiana | deceased | | | | |
| Richard A. Jones | King County Superior Court (1994–2007); United States District Court for the Western District of Washington (2007– ) | Washington | active | | | | |
| Sidney A. Jones | Cook County Circuit Court (1960–1980) | Illinois | deceased | | | | |
| Steve C. Jones | United States District Court for the Northern District of Georgia (2011– ) | Georgia | active | | | | |
| Tierra Jones | Clark County District Court (2017– ) | Nevada | active | | | | |
| Tonya Jones | Harris County Criminal Court at Law No. 15 (2019– ) | Texas | active | | | | |
| Tanya Jones Bosier | Superior Court of the District of Columbia (2017– ) | Washington, D.C. | active | | | | |
| Claudia Jordan | Denver County Court (1994–2014) | Colorado | retired | | | | |
| Robert E. Jourdan | Chelan County Superior Court (2021– ) | Washington | active | | | | |
| J. Curtis Joyner | Chester County Court of Common Pleas for the 15th Judicial District of Pennsylvania (1987–1992); United States District Court for the Eastern District of Pennsylvania (1992–2021) | Pennsylvania | retired | | | | |
| Maria Araújo Kahn | Connecticut Superior Court (2006–2017); Connecticut Appellate Court (2017); Supreme Court of Connecticut (2017–2023); United States Court of Appeals for the Second Circuit (2023– ) | Connecticut | active | | | | |
| Abdul Kallon | United States District Court for the Northern District of Alabama (2010–2022) | Alabama | resigned | | | | |
| Michelle Kazadi | Los Angeles County Superior Court (2021– ) | California | active | | | | |
| Amalya Lyle Kearse | United States Court of Appeals for the Second Circuit (1979– ) | New York | active | | | | |
| Damon Keith | United States District Court for the Eastern District of Michigan (1967–1977); United States Court of Appeals for the Sixth Circuit (1977–2019) | Michigan | deceased | | | | |
| Angel Kelley | Brockton District Court (2009–2013); Massachusetts Superior Court (2013–2021); United States District Court for the District of Massachusetts (2021– ) | Massachusetts | active | | | | |
| Cain James Kennedy | Mobile County Circuit Court (1979–1998) | Alabama | deceased | | | | |
| Henry H. Kennedy Jr. | United States District Court for the District of Columbia (1997– ) | Washington, D.C. | inactive | | | | |
| Embry Kidd | United States District Court for the Middle District of Florida (2019–2024); United States Court of Appeals for the Eleventh Circuit (2024– ) | Florida | active | | | | |
| Peter Killough | Supreme Court of Maryland (2024– ) | Maryland | active | | | | |
| James C. Kimbrough | Lake County Superior Court (1974–1987) | Indiana | deceased | | | | |
| Klinette H. Kindred | United States Bankruptcy Court Eastern District of Virginia (2017– ) | Virginia | active | | | | |
| Kimberly Kiner | LaPorte Superior Court (Judge Pro Tem: appt. 2013) | Indiana | deceased | | | | |
| Alex Kinlaw Jr. | South Carolina Circuit Court (2018– ) | South Carolina | active | | | | |
| David M. Krashna | Alameda County Municipal Court (Commissioner: 1992–1998); Alameda County Superior Court (Commissioner: 1998–2001; Judge: 2001–2015) | California | retired | | | | |
| Leondra Kruger | California Supreme Court (2015– ) | California | active | | | | |
| William Francis Kuntz II | United States District Court for the Eastern District of New York (2011– ) | New York | active | | | | |
| Gary L. Lancaster | United States District Court for the Western District of Pennsylvania (1987–2013) | Pennsylvania | deceased | | | | |
| Adam B. Landy | United States Tax Court (2021– ) | Washington, D.C. | active | | | | |
| Monique Langhorne | Napa County Superior Court (2019–2023) Courts of Appeal, First Appellate District, Division One (2023– ) | California | active | | | | |
| Rick Lawrence | Lewiston District Court (2000–2022) Supreme Judicial Court (2022– ) | Maine | active | | | | |
| Alison Renee Lee | South Carolina Fifth Judicial Circuit (1999–2023) | South Carolina | retired | | | | |
| Amarra A. Lee | San Mateo Superior Court (2018– ) | California | active | | | | |
| Eunice C. Lee | United States Court of Appeals for the Second Circuit (2021– ) | New York | active | | | | |
| Gerald Bruce Lee | United States District Court for the Eastern District of Virginia (1998–2017) | Virginia | retired | | | | |
| Helen Shores Lee | Jefferson County Circuit Court (2003–2017) | Alabama | deceased | | | | |
| Ida Leggett | Idaho Second District Court (1992–1998) | Idaho | resigned | | | | |
| George N. Leighton | Circuit Court of Cook County (1964–1969); First District Appellate Court of Illinois (1969–1976); United States District Court for the Northern District of Illinois (1976–1987) | Illinois | deceased | | | | |
| Ivan L. R. Lemelle | United States District Court for the Eastern District of Louisiana (1984– ) | Louisiana | active | | | | |
| John T. Letts | Grand Rapids Municipal Court (elect. 1959); Kent County District Court (elect. 1967) | Michigan | deceased | | | | |
| Bill Lewis | Alabama Circuit Court, Nineteenth Judicial Circuit (2016–2024); Alabama Court of Civil Appeals (2024–2025); Alabama Supreme Court (2025); United States District Court for the Middle District of Alabama (2025– ) | Alabama | active | Ola M. Lewis | North Carolina 13th Judicial District (appt. 1993) | North Carolina | deceased |
| Timothy K. Lewis | United States District Court for the Western District of Pennsylvania (1991–1992); United States Court of Appeals for the Third Circuit (1992–1999) | Pennsylvania | resigned | | | | |
| Reginald C. Lindsay | United States District Court for the District of Massachusetts (1993–2009) | Massachusetts | deceased | | | | |
| Sam A. Lindsay | United States District Court for the Northern District of Texas (1998– ) | Texas | active | | | | |
| Joe O. Littlejohn | San Diego County Superior Court (1995–2006) | California | retired | | | | |
| Melony Lockwood | Alaska Fourth Judicial District (2017–2021) | Alaska | resigned | | | | |
| Steven Logan | United States District Court for the District of Arizona (2014– ) | Arizona | active | | | | |
| Raymond Lohier | United States Court of Appeals for the Second Circuit (2010– ) | New York | active | | | | |
| James L. Long | Sacramento County Superior Court (app. 1982) | California | retired | | | | |
| Mary Johnson Lowe | New York City Criminal Court (1971–1973); New York County Supreme Court (1973–1974); Bronx County Supreme Court (1975–1976); Supreme Court of New York (1977–1978); United States District Court for the Southern District of New York (1978–1991) | New York | deceased | | | | |
| Alice A. Lytle | Sacramento Municipal Court (1983–1998); Sacramento County Superior Court (1998–2002) | California | deceased | | | | |
| Matthew J. Maddox | United States District Court for the District of Maryland (2022– ) | Maryland | active | | | | |
| Conrad Mallett Jr. | Michigan Supreme Court (1990–1998) | Michigan | retired | | | | |
| William A. Mallory | Hamilton County Municipal Court (1993–2006; 2011– ); Hamilton County Court of Common Pleas (2006–2009) Hamilton County First District Court of Appeals (2009–2011) | Ohio | active | | | | |
| Mercer M. Mance | Marion County Superior Court (1958–1978) | Indiana | deceased | | | | |
| Robert J. Mangum | New York State Court of Claims (appt. 1971) | New York | deceased | | | | |
| Blanche M. Manning | United States District Court for the Northern District of Illinois (1994–2020) | Illinois | deceased | | | | |
| L. Casey Manning | South Carolina Circuit Court (1994– ) | South Carolina | active | | | | |
| Jeralynn Manor | Harris County District Court (2021– ) | Texas | active | | | | |
| Calvin Mapp | Miami-Dade County Court (1973–1994) | Florida | deceased | | | | |
| Algenon L. Marbley | United States District Court for the Southern District of Ohio (1997– ) | Ohio | active | | | | |
| Consuelo Bland Marshall | United States District Court for the Central District of California (1980– ) | California | inactive | | | | |
| Thurgood Marshall | United States Court of Appeals for the Second Circuit (1961–1965); Supreme Court of the United States (1967–1991) | Washington, D.C. | deceased | | | | |
| Janice R. Martin | Kentucky District Court (1993–2009) | Kentucky | retired | | | | |
| Joshua W. Martin III | Superior Court of Delaware (1982–1989) | Delaware | resigned | | | | |
| Aaron B. Mason | Clayton County Superior Court (2016– ) | Georgia | active | | | | |
| Rhonda Mason | Johnson County Court (2016– ) | Kansas | active | | | | |
| Andre Mathis | United States Court of Appeals for the Sixth Circuit (2022– ) | Tennessee | active | | | | |
| Albert Matthews | Los Angeles Superior Court (Assigned Judge: appt. 1993) | California | deceased | | | | |
| James Campbell Matthews | Albany, New York Recorder's Court (1896–1899) | New York | deceased | | | | |
| Stephen L. Maxwell | Minnesota 2nd Judicial District Court (1967–1987) | Minnesota | deceased | | | | |
| Mabel Mayfield | Berrien County Courts (2000– ) | Michigan | active | | | | |
| William E. McAnulty Jr. | Jefferson County District Court (1977–1980; 1983–1990; 1993–1998); Kentucky Court of Appeals (1998–2006); Supreme Court of Kentucky (2006–2007) | Kentucky | deceased | | | | |
| Mark A. McCannon | Alameda County Superior Court (2013– ) | California | active | | | | |
| Jesse McClure | 339th District Court (2019–2020); Texas Court of Criminal Appeals (2021– ) | Texas | active | | | | |
| LaRonda J. McCoy | Los Angeles County Superior Court (2017– ) | California | active | | | | |
| Kari McCrea | Alaska Third Judicial District (2017– ) | Alaska | active | | | | |
| Wade H McCree Jr. | United States District Court for the Eastern District of Michigan (1961–1966) United States Court of Appeals for the Sixth Circuit (1966–1977) | Michigan | deceased | | | | |
| Wade Harper McCree | Wayne County Circuit Court (2004–2013; 2020– ) suspended and reinstated | Michigan | active | | | | |
| Joe Billy McDade | Tenth Judicial Circuit, State of Illinois (1982–1991); United States District Court for the Central District of Illinois (1991– ) | Illinois | active | | | | |
| Gabrielle Kirk McDonald | United States District Court for the Southern District of Texas (1979–1988) | Texas | resigned | | | | |
| Odell McGhee, II | Iowa District Court (2002– ) | Iowa | active | | | | |
| Theodore McKee | Philadelphia Court of Common Pleas (1984–1994); United States Court of Appeals for the Third Circuit (1994– ) | Pennsylvania | active | | | | |
| Kevin McKeever | Iowa District Court (2015– ) | Iowa | active | | | | |
| Elwood S. McKenney | Roxbury District Court (appt. 1960) | Massachusetts | deceased | | | | |
| Patricia McKinley | Bay District Municipal Court District (1982–1986) | California | deceased | | | | |
| Theodore McMillian | United States Court of Appeals for the Eighth Circuit (1978–2006) | Missouri | deceased | | | | |
| Brandy R. McMillion | United States District Court for the Eastern District of Michigan (2023– ) | Michigan | active | | | | |
| Tyrone Medley | Utah Fifth Circuit Court (1984–1992); Utah Third Circuit Court (1992–2012) | Utah | retired | | | | |
| Cordell D. Meeks Sr. | Wyandotte County District Court (1972–1980) | Kansas | deceased | | | | |
| Alfonza Menefee | Macon County Probate Court (1988–2019) | Alabama | retired | | | | |
| Orelia Merchant | United States District Court for the Eastern District of New York (2023– ) | New York | active | | | | |
| Robin M. Meriweather | United States District Court for the District of Columbia (2017–2024); United States Court of Federal Claims (2024– ) | Washington, D.C. | active | | | | |
| Natasha C. Merle | United States District Court for the Eastern District of New York (2023– ) | New York | active | | | | |
| Stephan P. Mickle | Alachua County Court (1979–1984); Florida Eighth Judicial Circuit (1984–1992); Florida First District Court of Appeal (1993–1998); United States District Court for the Northern District of Florida (1998–2021) | Florida | deceased | | | | |
| Vicki Miles-LaGrange | United States District Court for the Western District of Oklahoma (1994– ) | Oklahoma | inactive | | | | |
| Brian Stacy Miller | United States District Court for the Eastern District of Arkansas (2008– ) | Arkansas | active | | | | |
| Sheila Miller | 41B District Court (2006–2010) | Michigan | retired | | | | |
| Herbert E. Millin | Philadelphia Municipal Court (appt. 1947) | Pennsylvania | deceased | | | | |
| Toni Y. Mims-Cochran | Alameda County Superior Court (Commissioner: 2016–2022; Judge 2022) | California | active | | | | |
| Cameron Mitchell | Benton-Franklin Superior Court (2004– ) | Washington | deceased | | | | |
| Irvin C. Mollison | United States Customs Court (1945–1962) | New York | deceased | | | | |
| Tamika Montgomery–Reeves | Delaware Court of Chancery (2015–2019); Supreme Court of Delaware (2019–2023); United States Court of Appeals for the Third Circuit (2023– ) | Delaware | active | | | | |
| Vershenia Ballance Moody | Illinois 6th Judicial District (2012– ) | Illinois | active | | | | |
| Herman E. Moore | United States District Court of the Virgin Islands (1939–1957) | United States Virgin Islands | deceased | | | | |
| Lester V. Moore | Norfolk Juvenile and Domestic District Court (1976–1997) | Virginia | deceased | | | | |
| Michelle Moore | 314th District Court (2019– ) | Texas | active | | | | |
| Raymond P. Moore | United States District Court for the District of Colorado (2013– ) | Colorado | active | | | | |
| Terry F. Moorer | United States District Court for the Middle District of Alabama (2007–2018); United States District Court for the Southern District of Alabama (2018– ) | Alabama | active | | | | |
| Michael R. Morgan | Supreme Court of North Carolina (2016– ) | North Carolina | active | | | | |
| Ernest Nathan Morial | Louisiana Juvenile Court (1970–1974); Louisiana Fourth Circuit Court of Appeal (1974–1977) | Louisiana | deceased | | | | |
| Brittanye Morris | Harris County District Court (2021– ) | Texas | active | | | | |
| Carl W. Morris | Alameda County Municipal Court (1988–1993); Alameda County Superior Court (1993–2012) | California | retired | | | | |
| Denise Langford Morris | Oakland County Circuit Court (1992–2022) | Michigan | retired | | | | |
| Elizabeth Morris | Anne Arundel County Circuit Court (2018– ) | Maryland | active | | | | |
| Angil Morris-Jones | Merced County Superior Court (appt. 1997) | California | retired or lost reelection | | | | |
| Franklin Morton Jr. | New York Municipal Court (appt. 1958); New York State Supreme Court (elect. 1969) | New York | deceased | | | | |
| Constance Baker Motley | United States District Court for the Southern District of New York (1966–2005) | New York | deceased | | | | |
| Harriet Mitchell Murphy | Austin Municipal Court (1973–1993) | Texas | retired | | | | |
| Richard E. Myers II | United States District Court for the Eastern District of North Carolina (2019– ) | North Carolina | active | | | | |
| Julien Neals | United States District Court for the District of New Jersey (2021– ) | New Jersey | active | | | | |
| Adrienne Nelson | Multnomah County Circuit Court (2006–2018); Supreme Court of Oregon (2018–2023); United States District Court for the District of Oregon (2023– ) | Oregon | active | | | | |
| David Sutherland Nelson | Massachusetts Superior Court (1973–1979); United States District Court for the District of Massachusetts (1979–1998) | Massachusetts | deceased | | | | |
| P. Scott Neville Jr. | Illinois Supreme Court (2018– ) | Illinois | active | | | | |
| Irma Newburn | Oklahoma Fifth Judicial Circuit (2016–2021) Federal Immigration Judge (2021–) | Oklahoma Tennessee | active | | | | |
| Clifton B. Newman | South Carolina Circuit Court (2000–2023) | South Carolina | retired | | | | |
| Jocelyn Newman | South Carolina Circuit Court (2016– ) | South Carolina | active | | | | |
| Tara L. Newman | Los Angeles County Superior Court (2021– ) | California | active | | | | |
| Robert N. C. Nix Jr. | Supreme Court of Pennsylvania (1972–1996) | Pennsylvania | deceased | | | | |
| Troy L. Nunley | Sacramento County Superior Court (2002–2012); United States District Court for the Eastern District of California (2013– ) | California | active | | | | |
| Jimmy Nunn | Dallas County Probate Court (2018– ) | Alabama | active | | | | |
| Edirin Okoloko | Snohomish County Superior Court (2020– ) | Washington | active | | | | |
| Eileen A. Olds | Chesapeake Juvenile and Domestic Relations District Court (1995–2019) | Virginia | retired | | | | |
| Solomon Oliver Jr. | United States District Court for the Northern District of Ohio (1994– ) | Ohio | active | | | | |
| Vernon D. Oliver | Connecticut Superior Court (2009–2023); United States District Court for the District of Connecticut (2023– ) | Connecticut | active | | | | |
| Dayo O. Onanubosi | Idaho Third Judicial District (2009– ) | Idaho | active | | | | |
| Revius Ortique Jr. | Supreme Court of Louisiana (elec. 1992) | Louisiana | deceased | | | | |
| Alexis Otis-Lewis | St. Clair County Court (1992–2009) | Illinois | retired | | | | |
| Jalilah Otto | Jackson County Circuit Court (2017– ) | Missouri | active | | | | |
| Morris Overstreet | Texas Court of Criminal Appeals (1991–1999) | Texas | term ended | | | | |
| Charles L. Owens | Oklahoma County District Court (1968–1998) | Oklahoma | deceased | | | | |
| Alan Page | Supreme Court of Minnesota (1993–2015) | Minnesota | retired | | | | |
| Myles Paige | New York City Criminal Court (1939–1956); Domestic Relations Court (1958–1966) | New York | deceased | | | | |
| Wilma Palmer | Tulsa County District Court (2007– ) | Oklahoma | active | | | | |
| Darrel J. Papillion | United States District Court for the Eastern District of Louisiana (2023– ) | Louisiana | active | | | | |
| Barrington D. Parker | United States District Court for the District of Columbia (1969–1993) | Washington, D.C. | deceased | | | | |
| Barrington D. Parker Jr. | United States District Court for the Southern District of New York (1994–2001); United States Court of Appeals for the Second Circuit (2001– ) | New York | active | | | | |
| Gerald Parker | Montgomery County Common Pleas Court (2019– ) | Ohio | active | | | | |
| Linda Vivienne Parker | United States District Court for the Eastern District of Michigan (2014– ) | Michigan | active | | | | |
| James Benton Parsons | United States District Court for the Northern District of Illinois (1961–1993) | Illinois | deceased | | | | |
| Thomas H. Parrott | Los Angeles Superior Court (Commissioner: 1990–2006) | California | retired | | | | |
| Cecil B. Patterson Jr. | Maricopa County Superior Court (1980–1991); Arizona First Appellate Court (1995–2003) | Arizona | retired | | | | |
| Gary D. Payne | Fayette County Court (1988–2011) | Kentucky | retired | | | | |
| Latosha Lewis Payne | Harris County District Court (2019– ) | Texas | active | | | | |
| Sandra Peake | Harris County District Court (2019– ) | Texas | active | | | | |
| Benita Y. Pearson | United States District Court for the Northern District of Ohio (2008– ) | Ohio | active | | | | |
| John Garrett Penn | District of Columbia Court of General Sessions (1970–1971); Superior Court of the District of Columbia (1971–1979); United States District Court for the District of Columbia (1979–2007) | Washington, D.C. | deceased | | | | |
| Mia Roberts Perez | Philadelphia County Court of Common Pleas (2016–2022); United States District Court for the Eastern District of Pennsylvania (2022– ) | Pennsylvania | active | | | | |
| James E.C. Perry | Florida 18th Judicial Circuit (1999–2009); Supreme Court of Florida (2009–2016) | Florida | retired | | | | |
| Matthew J. Perry | United States Court of Military Appeals (1976–1979); United States District Court for the District of South Carolina (1979–2011) | South Carolina | deceased | | | | |
| Fredericka Phillips | Harris County District Court (2016– ) | Texas | active | | | | |
| Vel Phillips | Milwaukee County Circuit Court (1971–1978) | Wisconsin | deceased | | | | |
| Kenneth A. Phipps | Criminal Court of the City of New York (1958–1968) | New York | deceased | | | | |
| Risë Jones Pichon | Santa Clara Municipal Court (Commissioner: 1983–1984; Judge 1984–1998); Santa Clara Superior Court (1998–2019) | California | retired | | | | |
| Juan Pickett | Louisiana 32nd Judicial District (2015– ) | Louisiana | active | | | | |
| Lawrence W. Pierce | United States District Court for the Southern District of New York (1971–1981); United States Court of Appeals for the Second Circuit (1981–1995) | New York | retired | | | | |
| Victor Pippins Jr. | San Diego County Superior Court (2020– ) | California | active | | | | |
| Freddy Pitcher Jr. | Louisiana 19th Judicial District Court; Louisiana First Circuit Court of Appeal | Louisiana | retired | | | | |
| Elizabeth Davis Pittman | Omaha Municipal Court (1971–1986) | Nebraska | deceased | | | | |
| Donald F. Pitts | Los Angeles Superior Court (appt. 1984) | California | retired | | | | |
| Marlon Polk | Fourth Judicial District Court (2005– ) | Nebraska | active | | | | |
| Cecil F. Poole | United States District Court for the Northern District of California (1976–1980); United States Court of Appeals for the Ninth Circuit (1979–1997) | California | deceased | | | | |
| David M. Porter | Iowa District Court (2015– ) | Iowa | active | | | | |
| John D. Posten | United States District Court for the District of Montana (United States Commissioner: 1893–1917) | Montana | deceased | | | | |
| Cleo Powell | Virginia Court of Appeals (2008–2011); Supreme Court of Virginia (2011– ) | Virginia | active | | | | |
| Tanya Walton Pratt | United States District Court for the Southern District of Indiana (2010– ) | Indiana | active | | | | |
| William A. Price | Justice of the Peace for Matagorda (appt. 1872) | Texas | deceased | | | | |
| John E. Prim | Seattle Municipal Court (Judge pro tem: appt. 1954) | Washington | deceased | | | | |
| Doris Pryor | United States District Court for the Southern District of Indiana (2018–2022); United States Court of Appeals for the Seventh Circuit (2022– ) | Indiana | active | | | | |
| Jason K. Pulliam | Texas Fourth Court of Appeals (2015–2016); United States District Court for the Western District of Texas (2019– ) | Texas | active | | | | |
| Rudolph R. Pyle III | Madison County Circuit Court (2009–2012); Indiana Court of Appeals (2012– ) | Indiana | active | | | | |
| William D. Quarles Jr. | United States District Court for the District of Maryland (2003–2016) | Maryland | retired | | | | |
| Peggy Quince | Supreme Court of Florida (1999–2019) | Florida | retired | | | | |
| Henry Ramsey Jr. | Alameda County Superior Court (1981–1990) | California | deceased | | | | |
| Murlene J. Randle | San Francisco County Superior Court (2020– ) | California | active | | | | |
| Robin Ransom | St. Louis County Family Court (2002–2008); 22nd Judicial Circuit Court (2008–2018); Missouri Court of Appeals, Eastern District (2019–2021); Missouri Supreme Court (2021– ) | Missouri | active | | | | |
| Nusrat Rashid | Delaware County Court of Common Pleas (2019– ) | Pennsylvania | active | | | | |
| Monique F. Rauls | Louisiana 9th Judicial District Court (2015– ) | Louisiana | active | | | | |
| Johnnie B. Rawlinson | United States District Court for the District of Nevada (1998–2000); United States Court of Appeals for the Ninth Circuit (2000– ) | Nevada | active | | | | |
| Thomas J. Reddick Jr. | Broward County Court of Record; Florida Circuit Court | Florida | deceased | | | | |
| Carlton W. Reeves | United States District Court for the Southern District of Mississippi (2010– ) | Mississippi | active | | | | |
| Dawna F. Reeves | Stanislaus County Superior Court (2008– ) | California | active | | | | |
| Sheldon K. Rennie | Superior Court of Delaware (2018– ) | Delaware | active | | | | |
| Gloria Clark Reno | Missouri 21st Judicial Circuit (2002–2020) | Missouri | retired | | | | |
| Dianne Renwick | New York City Civil Court (1977–2001); New York Supreme Court (2001–2008); Supreme Court, First Judicial Department (2008– ) | New York | active | | | | |
| Edward A. Reid | Camden County Domestic Relations Court (appt. 1956) | New Jersey | deceased | | | | |
| Robert L. Reid | Las Vegas Alternate Municipal Court (appt. 1966–1970) Justice of the Peace for Las Vegas Township (1970– ) | Nevada | active | | | | |
| Scoval Richardson | United States Customs Court (1957–1980); United States Court of International Trade (1980–1982) | New York | deceased | | | | |
| Tony L. Richardson | Los Angeles County Superior Court (2012– ) | California | active | | | | |
| Moxey Rigby | Nassau County District Court (elect. 1959) | New York | deceased | | | | |
| Elizabeth Riggs | San Diego Superior Court (1979–2011) | California | deceased | | | | |
| Frances E. Rivers | New York City Court (1943–1963) | New York | deceased | | | | |
| Andree Layton Roaf | Arkansas Supreme Court (1995–1996); Arkansas Court of Appeals (1996–2006) | Arkansas | retired | | | | |
| Richard W. Roberts | United States District Court for the District of Columbia (1998– ) | Washington, D.C. | inactive | | | | |
| Terrie E. Roberts | San Diego County Superior Court (2019– ) | California | active | | | | |
| Victoria A. Roberts | United States District Court for the Eastern District of Michigan (1998–2023) | Michigan | retired | | | | |
| Alfred S. Robbins | New York State Supreme Court (appt. 1979) | New York | deceased | | | | |
| Aubrey Eugene Robinson Jr. | Juvenile Court of the District of Columbia (1965–1966); United States District Court for the District of Columbia (1966–2000) | Washington, D.C. | deceased | | | | |
| G. Bruce Robinson | Boston Juvenile Court (appt. 1948) | Massachusetts | deceased | | | | |
| Julie A. Robinson | United States District Court for the District of Kansas (2001– ) | Kansas | active | | | | |
| Richard A. Robinson | Connecticut Supreme Court (2013–2024) | Connecticut | retired | | | | |
| Spottswood William Robinson III | United States District Court for the District of Columbia (1964–1966); United States Court of Appeals for the District of Columbia Circuit (1966–1998) | Washington, D.C. | deceased | | | | |
| Stephen C. Robinson | United States District Court for the Southern District of New York (2003–2010) | New York | resigned | | | | |
| Edward Rodgers | Palm Beach County Court (1973–1995) | Florida | deceased | | | | |
| Dawn Rogers | Harris County District Court (2021– ) | Texas | active | | | | |
| Judith Ann Wilson Rogers | District of Columbia Court of Appeals (1983–1994); United States Court of Appeals for the District of Columbia Circuit (1994– ) | Washington, D.C. | active | | | | |
| Eleanor L. Ross | United States District Court for the Northern District of Georgia (2014– ) | Georgia | active | | | | |
| Joseph D. Roulhac | Akron Municipal Court (1967–1987) | Ohio | deceased | | | | |
| Robert D. Rucker | Supreme Court of Indiana (1999–2017) | Indiana | retired | | | | |
| George Lewis Ruffin | Municipal Court, Charlestown District (appt. 1883) | Massachusetts | deceased | | | | |
| John "Jack" H. Ruffin Jr. | Georgia Court of Appeals (1994–2008) | Georgia | deceased | | | | |
| George L. Russell Jr. | Supreme Bench of Baltimore (1966–1968) | Maryland | retired | | | | |
| George L. Russell III | Maryland Circuit Court, Baltimore City (2007–2012); United States District Court for the District of Maryland (2012– ) | Maryland | active | | | | |
| Edith S. Sampson | Municipal Court of Chicago (1962–1966); Circuit Court of Cook County (1966–1978) | Illinois | deceased | | | | |
| James B. Sanderlin | Pinellas County Court (1972–1985); Florida District Court of Appeals (1985–1987) | Florida | deceased | | | | |
| Willie Louis Sands | United States District Court for the Middle District of Georgia (1994– ) | Georgia | inactive | | | | |
| Anita L. Santos | Contra Costa County Superior Court (Commissioner: 2012–2014; Judge: 2014–2022) | California | retired | | | | |
| Ruth Sconiers | Buffalo City Court (1987–1993); New York Supreme Court 8th Judicial District (1993–2010); New York Supreme Court, Appellate Division, Fourth Department (2010–2016) | New York | retired | | | | |
| Calvin L. Scott Jr. | Superior Court of Delaware (2003– ) | Delaware | active | | | | |
| Elisha Scott | Michigan Department of Labor | Michigan | deceased | | | | |
| Gregory Kellam Scott | Colorado Supreme Court (1992–2000) | Colorado | resigned | | | | |
| Kai Scott | Philadelphia County Court of Common Pleas (2015–2022); United States District Court for the Eastern District of Pennsylvania (2022– ) | Pennsylvania | active | | | | |
| Mary Stenson Scriven | United States District Court for the Middle District of Florida (2008– ) | Florida | active | | | | |
| Renard F. Shepard | Sacramento County Municipal Court (1998–1998); Sacramento County Superior Court (1998– ) | California | retired | | | | |
| Leah Ward Sears | Fulton County Superior Court (1988–1992); Supreme Court of Georgia (1992–2009) | Georgia | resigned | | | | |
| Myra C. Selby | Indiana Supreme Court (1995–1999) | Indiana | retired | | | | |
| Jamel K. Semper | United States District Court for the District of New Jersey (2023– ) | New Jersey | active | | | | |
| Phyllis Senegal | Lake County Superior Court (appt. 1975) | Indiana | deceased | | | | |
| Margaret B. Seymour | United States District Court for the District of South Carolina (1996–2022) | South Carolina | retired | | | | |
| Charles Alexander Shaw | United States District Court for the Eastern District of Missouri (1993–2020) | Missouri | deceased | | | | |
| Leander J. Shaw Jr. | Florida District Courts of Appeal (1979–1983); Supreme Court of Florida (1983–2003) | Florida | deceased | | | | |
| Phrasel L. Shelton | San Mateo Municipal Court (1976–1988); San Mateo County Superior Court (1988–2004) | California | deceased | | | | |
| Rod Shelton | San Diego County Superior Court (2007– ) | California | active | | | | |
| Michael A. Shipp | United States District Court for the District of New Jersey (2007– ) | New Jersey | active | | | | |
| Benjamin Shobe | Jefferson County Circuit Court (1976–1992) | Kentucky | deceased | | | | |
| Paul Allen Simmons | United States District Court for the Western District of Pennsylvania (1978–2014) | Pennsylvania | deceased | | | | |
| James E. Simmons Jr. | San Diego County Superior Court (2017–2023); United States District Court for the Southern District of California (2023– ) | California | active | | | | |
| Leah Simms | Dade County Superior Court (appt. 1981) | Florida | retired | | | | |
| Sandra A. Simms | Oahu Circuit Court (1991–2004) | Hawaii | retired | | | | |
| Frederick Wayman "Duke" Slater | Cook County Superior Court (appt. 1960) | Illinois | deceased | | | | |
| Fred W. Slaughter | Orange County Superior Court (2014–2022); United States District Court for the Central District of California (2022– ) | California | active | | | | |
| Gregory M. Sleet | United States District Court for the District of Delaware (1998–2018) | Delaware | retired | | | | |
| Charles Smiley | Alameda County Superior Court (Commissioner: 2007–2012; Judge: 2012– ) | California | active | | | | |
| Charles Z. Smith | Supreme Court of Washington (1998–2002) | Washington | deceased | | | | |
| Erithe A. Smith | U.S. Bankruptcy Court—Central (1994– ) | California | active | | | | |
| George Bundy Smith | New York Appellate Division, First Department (1987–1992) | New York | retired | | | | |
| Karla Smith | Montgomery District Court (2012–2015) Montgomery County Circuit Court (2015– ) | Maryland | active | | | | |
| Lavenski Smith | Arkansas Supreme Court (1999–2000); United States Court of Appeals for the Eighth Circuit (2002– ) | Arkansas | active | | | | |
| Lori K. Smith | Washington Court of Appeals (2018– ) | Washington | active | | | | |
| Lynne H. Smith or Lynne M Hobbs | Los Angeles County Superior Court (2012– ) | California | active | | | | |
| Micah W. J. Smith | United States District Court for the District of Hawaii (2024– ) | Hawaii | active | | | | |
| Otis M. Smith | Michigan Supreme Court (1961–1966) | Michigan | deceased | | | | |
| Rodney Smith | Miami-Dade County Court (2008–2012); Eleventh Judicial Circuit Court of Florida (2012–2019); United States District Court for the Southern District of Florida (2019– ) | Florida | active | | | | |
| Doris Smith-Ribner | Pennsylvania Commonwealth Court (1987–2009) | Pennsylvania | retired | | | | |
| Julie S. Sneed | United States District Court for the Middle District of Florida (2015– ) | Florida | active | | | | |
| Joe Somers | Champaign County Court (elec. 1961) | Illinois | deceased | | | | |
| Theodore O. Spaulding | Pennsylvania Superior Court (appt. 1966) | Pennsylvania | deceased | | | | |
| James R. Spencer | United States District Court for the Eastern District of Virginia (1986–2017) | Virginia | retired | | | | |
| Vaino Spencer | California Second Appellate District (1980–2007) | California | deceased | | | | |
| Erica Standfield Brandon | North Carolina 17A Judicial District (2019– ) | North Carolina | active | | | | |
| Booker T. Stephens | Eighth Judicial Circuit, McDowell County (c. 1985–2019) | West Virginia | retired | | | | |
| William H. Stephens | Marin County Superior Court | California | retired | | | | |
| Barry Stevens | Superior Court of Connecticut (1994–) | Connecticut | active | | | | |
| Harold A. Stevens | New York Court of General Sessions (1950–1955); New York Supreme Court (1955–1974); New York Court of Appeals (1974–1977) | New York | deceased | | | | |
| Carl E. Stewart | United States Court of Appeals for the Fifth Circuit (1994– ) | Louisiana | active | | | | |
| LaToyia Jenkins Stewart | Passaic County Superior Court (2017– ) | New Jersey | active | | | | |
| Melody J. Stewart | Ohio 8th District Court of Appeals (2006–2019); Supreme Court of Ohio (2019– ) | Ohio | active | | | | |
| Charles M. Stokes | King County District Court (1968–1978) | Washington | deceased | | | | |
| Jesse N. Stone | Supreme Court of Louisiana (1972–1974) | Louisiana | term ended | | | | |
| William Stone | Williamsburg-James City County Court (1968–1998) | Virginia | deceased | | | | |
| Rita L. Stotts | Circuit Court in the Shelby County (2000–2009) | Tennessee | deceased | | | | |
| Juanita Kidd Stout | Supreme Court of Pennsylvania (1988–1989) | Pennsylvania | deceased | | | | |
| Diane Clarke Streett | Superior Court of Delaware (2010– ) | Delaware | active | | | | |
| Emmet G. Sullivan | United States District Court for the District of Columbia (1994– ) | Washington, D.C. | active | | | | |
| Laura Taylor Swain | United States District Court for the Southern District of New York (2000– ) | New York | active | | | | |
| V. Raymond Swope | San Mateo County Superior Court (2010– ) | California | active | | | | |
| Daphne Sykes | Orange County Superior Court (2010– ) | California | active | | | | |
| Germaine J. Tanner | Harris County District Court (2019– ) | Texas | active | | | | |
| Jack Edward Tanner | United States District Court for the Eastern District of Washington (1978); United States District Court for the Western District of Washington (1978–1991; 1991–2006) | Washington | deceased | | | | |
| Anna Diggs Taylor | United States District Court for the Eastern District of Michigan (1979–2017) | Michigan | deceased | | | | |
| Tricia Taylor | Los Angeles County Superior Court (2019– ) | California | active | | | | |
| Wilford Taylor Jr. | Hampton District Court (appt. 1995) | Virginia | deceased | | | | |
| Darwin W. Telesford | New York State Supreme Court, First Judicial District (elect. 1964) | New York | deceased | | | | |
| Clarence Thomas | United States Court of Appeals for the District of Columbia Circuit (1990–1991); Supreme Court of the United States (1991– ) | Washington, D.C. | active | | | | |
| Holly A. Thomas | Los Angeles County Superior Court (2018–2022); United States Court of Appeals for the Ninth Circuit (2022– ) | California | active | | | | |
| John Charles Thomas | Supreme Court of Virginia (1983–1989) | Virginia | resigned | | | | |
| Lawton E. Thomas | Negro Municipal Court (appt. 1950; court has since disbanded) | Florida | deceased | | | | |
| Roderick B. Thomas | Dallas County Criminal Court (1874) | Alabama | deceased | | | | |
| Lauren Thomasson | San Joaquin County Superior Court (2005– ) | California | active | | | | |
| Alvin W. Thompson | United States District Court for the District of Connecticut (1994– ) | Connecticut | inactive | | | | |
| Anne Elise Thompson | United States District Court for the District of New Jersey (1979–2001) | New Jersey | retired | | | | |
| Carolyn Thompson | NC Court of Appeals (2023–2024); NC District Court Judge; NC Superior Court District 9 Judge | North Carolina | inactive | | | | |
| Emerson R. Thompson Jr. | Orange County Court (1976–1980); Ninth Judicial Circuit Court (1980–1993); Florida 5th Judicial Court (1993–2019) | Florida | retired | | | | |
| Myron Herbert Thompson | United States District Court for the Middle District of Alabama (1980– ) | Alabama | inactive | | | | |
| Ojetta Rogeriee Thompson | United States Court of Appeals for the First Circuit (2010– ) | Rhode Island | active | | | | |
| Patrick S. Thompson | San Francisco County Superior Court (2022– ) | California | active | | | | |
| Trina Thompson | Alameda County Superior Court (2003–2022); United States District Court for the Northern District of California (2022– ) | California | active | | | | |
| Willie Thompson | Supreme Court, Appellate Division, Second Department (ret. 2001) | New York | deceased | | | | |
| Sherry M. Thompson-Taylor | San Diego County Superior Court (2022– ) | California | active | | | | |
| C. Elliott Thornton | Harris County District Court (2021– ) | Texas | active | | | | |
| Patricia Timmons-Goodson | North Carolina Supreme Court (2006–2012) | North Carolina | resigned | | | | |
| Patricia Titus | Los Angeles County Superior Court (2000– ) | California | active | | | | |
| Demetrica Todd-Ruiz | Vineland Municipal Court (2017–2023) Salem Superior Court (2023–) | New Jersey | active | | | | |
| Shirley Tolentino | Jersey City Municipal Court (1976–1984); New Jersey Superior Court (1984–2010) | New Jersey | deceased | | | | |
| Charles H. Toliver IV | Superior Court of Delaware (1990–2014) | Delaware | retired | | | | |
| Analisa Torres | New York City Criminal Court (2000–2002); New York City Civil Court (2003–2004); New York Supreme Court (2004–2013); United States District Court for the Southern District of New York (2013– ) | New York | active | | | | |
| Faya Ora Rose Touré | Alabama Municipal Courts (1973–1977) | Alabama | resigned | | | | |
| Sandra L. Townes | City Court of Syracuse (1988–1999); Fifth Judicial District New York Supreme Court (2000–2004); 2nd Judicial Department of the New York State Supreme Court (2001–2004); United States District Court for the Eastern District of New York (2004–2018) | New York | deceased | | | | |
| Randa Trapp | San Diego County Superior Court (ret. 2021) | California | retired | | | | |
| Marcus O. Tucker | Long Beach Municipal Court (appt. 1976–1985); Los Angeles Superior Court (1985–2004) | California | deceased | | | | |
| Petrese B. Tucker | United States District Court for the Eastern District of Pennsylvania (2000– ) | Pennsylvania | active | | | | |
| Jasmine Twitty | Easley Municipal Court (2015– ) | South Carolina | active | | | | |
| Ralph E. Tyson | United States District Court for the Middle District of Louisiana (1998–2011) | Louisiana | deceased | | | | |
| Franklin U. Valderrama | Circuit Court of Cook County (2007–2020); United States District Court for the Northern District of Illinois (2020– ) | Illinois | active | | | | |
| Leo Valentine Jr. | San Diego Municipal Court (1995–1998); San Diego County Superior Court (1998–2019) | California | retired | | | | |
| Holly Veal | Henry County Superior Court (Flint Judicial Circuit) (2018– ) | Georgia | active | | | | |
| Teresa Vincent | Guilford County District Court (2019– ) | North Carolina | active | | | | |
| Joseph Cornelius Waddy | United States District Court for the District of Columbia.(1967–1978) | Washington, D.C. | deceased | | | | |
| Herman G. Walker | Superior Court of Alaska-Anchorage (2015– ) | Alaska | active | | | | |
| Jamar K. Walker | United States District Court for the Eastern District of Virginia (2023– ) | Virginia | active | | | | |
| Toni Wallace | Fort Bend County Court at Law No.5 (2016– ) | Texas | active | | | | |
| William H. Walls | United States District Court for the District of New Jersey (1994–2019) | New Jersey | deceased | | | | |
| Reggie Walton | United States District Court for the District of Columbia (2001– ); United States Foreign Intelligence Surveillance Court (2007–2014) | Washington, D.C. | active | | | | |
| Horace Ward | Fulton County Civil Court (1974–1977); Superior Court of Fulton County (1977–1979); United States District Court for the Northern District of Georgia (1979–2016) | Georgia | retired | | | | |
| James Ware | United States District Court for the Northern District of California (1990–2012) | California | retired | | | | |
| Joyce Elise Williams Warren | Pulaski County Juvenile Court (1983–1990); Arkansas Sixth Judicial District (1991–2020) | Arkansas | active | | | | |
| Lisa R. Washington | Los Angeles County Superior Court (2020– ) | California | active | | | | |
| Pamela Scott Washington | Alaska District Court (2010– ) | Alaska | active | | | | |
| Paul J. Watford | United States Court of Appeals for the Ninth Circuit (2012–2023) | California | resigned | | | | |
| James Lopez Watson | United States Customs Court (1966–1980); United States Court of International Trade (1980–2001) | New York | deceased | | | | |
| Robert B. Watts | Baltimore Municipal Court (appt. 1960); Supreme Bench of Baltimore City (1968–1985) | Maryland | deceased | | | | |
| Gerald Webb | Hamilton County General Sessions Court (2019– ) | Tennessee | active | | | | |
| E. Gregory Wells | Maryland Court of Special Appeals (2019– ) | Maryland | active | | | | |
| Ryan Wells | Fresno County Superior Court (2021– ) | California | active | | | | |
| Briana Westry-Robinson | Wilcox County District Court (2017– ) | Alabama | active | | | | |
| Nancy Cornelia Wheeler (formerly Francis) | Washtenaw County Trial Court (1990–2014) | Michigan | retired | | | | |
| Charles W. White | Court of Common Pleas (appt. 1955) | Ohio | deceased | | | | |
| George Washington White | United States District Court for the Northern District of Ohio (1980–2011) | Ohio | deceased | | | | |
| Maxine White | Milwaukee County Court (1992–2020) Wisconsin Court of Appeals (2020– ) | Wisconsin | active | | | | |
| Ronnie L. White | Supreme Court of Missouri (1995–2007); United States District Court for the Eastern District of Missouri (2014–2024) | Missouri | retired | | | | |
| Jamal Whitehead | United States District Court for the Western District of Washington (2023– ) | Washington | active | | | | |
| Helen Whitener | Pierce County Superior Court (2015–2020); Washington Supreme Court (2020– ) | Washington | active | | | | |
| Marshall I. Whitley | Alameda County Municipal Court (1993–1998); Alameda County Superior Court (1998–2013) | California | retired | | | | |
| Tadia Whitner | Gwinnett County Superior Court (2019– ) | Georgia | active | | | | |
| Susan D. Wigenton | United States District Court for the District of New Jersey (2006– ) | New Jersey | active | | | | |
| Alton W. Wiley Sr. | Rhode Island District Court (1981–1991); Rhode Island Superior Court (appt. 1991) | Rhode Island | retired | | | | |
| Monica Wiley | San Francisco County Superior Court (2009– ) | California | active | | | | |
| Henry "Hank" Wilkins IV | Jefferson County Court (2017–2018) | Arkansas | resigned | | | | |
| Robert L. Wilkins | United States District Court for the District of Columbia (2010–2014); United States Court of Appeals for the District of Columbia Circuit (2014– ) | Washington, D.C. | active | | | | |
| Alexander Williams Jr. | United States District Court for the District of Maryland (1994–2014) | Maryland | retired | | | | |
| Ann Claire Williams | United States District Court for the Northern District of Illinois (1985–1999); United States Court of Appeals for the Seventh Circuit (1999–2018) | Illinois | retired | | | | |
| Arthur G. Williams | Madison Circuit Court | Connecticut | deceased | | | | |
| David W. Williams | Los Angeles Municipal Court (1956–1962); Los Angeles County Superior Court (1962–1969); United States District Court for the Central District of California (1969–2000) | California | deceased | | | | |
| Felicia Toney Williams | Louisiana Second Circuit Court of Appeal (1992–2020) | Louisiana | retired | | | | |
| Gregory B. Williams | United States District Court for the District of Delaware (2022– ) | Delaware | active | | | | |
| Janice M. Williams | Solano County Superior Court (2021– ) | California | active | | | | |
| Jean Williams | Tucson Municipal Courts (1974–1976); Phoenix Municipal Court (1976–1996) | Arizona | deceased | | | | |
| LaShawn A. Williams | Harris County Civil. Court at Law #3 (2018– ) | Texas | active | | | | |
| Karen M. Williams | United States District Court for the District of New Jersey (2009– ) | New Jersey | active | | | | |
| Milton L. Williams | Supreme Court of the State of New York (1993–2002, 2003–2008) | New York | retired | | | | |
| Oliver D. Williams | New York State Supreme Court (1963–1968) | New York | deceased | | | | |
| Omar A. Williams | Connecticut Superior Court for the District of New London (2016–2021); United States District Court for the District of Connecticut (2021– ) | Connecticut | active | | | | |
| Charles J. Willoughby Jr. | Superior Court of the District of Columbia (2024– ) | Washington, D.C. | active | | | | |
| Charles R. Wilson | United States Court of Appeals for the Eleventh Circuit (1999– ) | Florida | active | | | | |
| Lionel Wilson | Alameda County Municipal Court (1960–1964); Alameda County Superior Court (1964–1977) | California | deceased | | | | |
| Brian C. Wimes | United States District Court for the Western District of Missouri/United States District Court for the Eastern District of Missouri (2012– ) | Missouri | active | | | | |
| Henry Travillion Wingate | United States District Court for the Southern District of Mississippi (1985– ) | Alabama | active | | | | |
| Joan Winn | Dallas County Court at Law (1975–1978); 191st District Court (appt. 1978) | Texas | retired | | | | |
| Andrea R. Wood | United States District Court for the Northern District of Illinois (2013– ) | Illinois | active | | | | |
| Gregory Howard Woods | United States District Court for the Southern District of New York (2013– ) | New York | active | | | | |
| Joseph Wood | Washington County (2017–2023?) | Arkansas | resigned to seek different office | | | | |
| W. Fillmore Wood | Union County Court | New Jersey | deceased | | | | |
| Jonathan Jasper Wright | Supreme Court of South Carolina (1870–1877) | South Carolina | deceased | | | | |
| Otis D. Wright II | Los Angeles County Superior Court (2005–2007); United States District Court for the Central District of California (2007– ) | California | active | | | | |
| Wilhelmina Wright | Ramsey County District Court (2000–2002); Minnesota Court of Appeals (2002–2012); Minnesota Supreme Court (2012–2016); United States District Court for the District of Minnesota (2016– ) | Minnesota | active | | | | |
| James A. Wynn Jr. | North Carolina Supreme Court (1998); North Carolina Court of Appeals (1999–2010); United States Court of Appeals for the Fourth Circuit (2010– ) | North Carolina | active | | | | |
| Robert W. Yancey | Essex County Court (1960–1972) | New Jersey | deceased | | | | |
| Staci Michelle Yandle | United States District Court for the Southern District of Illinois (2014– ) | Illinois | active | | | | |
| K. Patrick Yarbrough | Illinois 17th Judicial Circuit Court (2007–2019) | Illinois | retired | | | | |
| Lowynn Y. Young | Los Angeles County Superior Court (2021– ) | California | active | | | | |
| Reuben Young | North Carolina Court of Appeals (2019–2020) | North Carolina | active | | | | |
| Roderick C. Young | United States District Court for the Eastern District of Virginia (2014– ) | Virginia | active | | | | |
| John Milton Younge | Court of Common Pleas for Philadelphia County (1996–2019); United States District Court for the Eastern District of Pennsylvania (2019– ) | Pennsylvania | active | | | | |

== See also ==
- List of African American federal judges
- List of Asian American jurists
- List of Hispanic and Latino American jurists
- List of Jewish American jurists
- List of LGBT jurists in the United States
- List of Native American jurists
- List of first women lawyers and judges in the United States
- List of first minority male lawyers and judges in the United States

== Bibliography ==
Smith, John Clay Jr. (1999). Emancipation: The Making of the Black Lawyer, 1844–1944. Philadelphia, Pennsylvania: University of Pennsylvania Press. ISBN 9780812216851.
