= Solano County Superior Court =

Superior Court of California, County of Solano
- Jurisdiction: California; Solano County, California
- Website: solano.courts.ca.gov

Presiding Judge
- Currently: William J. Pendergast, III
- Since: Jan 1, 2026
- Lead position ends: Dec 31, 2027

Assistant Presiding Judge
- Currently: Shauna L. Chastain
- Since: Jan 1, 2026
- Lead position ends: Dec 31, 2027

Court Executive Officer
- Currently: Brian K. Taylor

The Superior Court of California, County of Solano is the California superior court with jurisdiction over Solano County.

== Historical Summary ==
The California Constitution of 1849 laid the framework for the judicial system. In Solano County, prior to the establishment of the superior court, there was a County Court and Court of Sessions. In 1854, the Court of Sessions ordered that Solano County be divided into the townships of Montezuma, Suisun, Green Valley, Vacaville, Vallejo, Benicia and Tremont. By the following year, the Court of Sessions was abolished and a Board of Supervisors was created in its stead.

By 1873, the County Court was established and the first judge elected. In 1885, the Solano County Superior Court was created. Nevertheless, Solano County still possessed municipal courts in its districts. California Proposition 3 (1950) laid the groundwork for the Vallejo Municipal Court to be formed due to the city’s expanding population. California Senate Bill 136 (1975) allowed for the Solano County Board of Supervisors to enact an ordinance consolidating the Fairfield-Suisun-Vacaville District and Dixon Judicial District. The districts were then unified and renamed as the Northern Solano Judicial District. There was another merger in 1975 that established the Vallejo-Benicia Municipal Court.

The Northern Solano Judicial District comprised municipal and small claims courts and included a civil and traffic division. Whereas the Solano County Superior Court handled legal matters such as felonies, divorces, and other matters such as probate. By 1987, there was the Solano County Superior Court, Vallejo Municipal Court District, and Northern Solano Judicial District. Following the passing of Proposition 220 (1998), Solano’s municipal courts were consolidated with the superior court.

== Courthouses ==
=== Fairfield ===
In 1850, the first courthouse was erected in Benicia. When the county seat was moved from Benicia to Fairfield in 1858, a courthouse construction project was spearheaded by Captain Robert Waterman. The initial building became too small, and a new brick courthouse was thereby constructed in 1860. By 1909, the courthouse had been expanded to include a Hall of Records (which contained the County Clerk and County Recorder offices) and a county jail. The courthouse grew dilapidated and unsafe due to damage sustained from an earthquake that occurred in 1892. In 1910, the Board of Supervisors accepted a bid to construct a new courthouse, and the prior building was razed to make way for construction.

==== Old Solano Courthouse ====
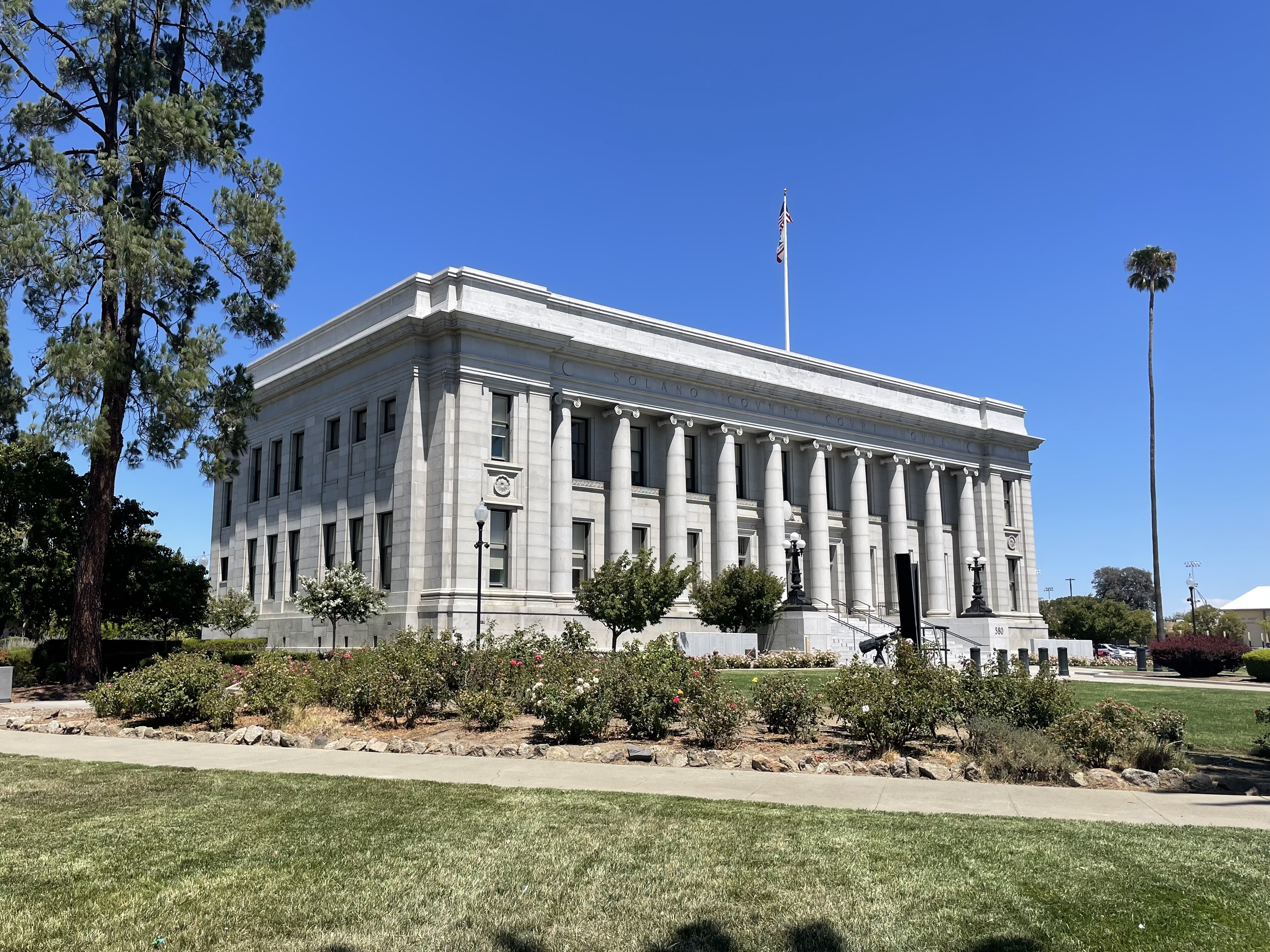
Old Solano Courthouse in 2022

The Old Solano Courthouse is located at 580 Texas Street in Fairfield, California. The Beaux-Arts building, designed by architect E.C. Hemmings, was originally built in 1911 and functioned as a courthouse until 1970 when the Hall of Justice was officially opened. The building then housed several county offices until the Solano County Government Center was constructed in 2005. Henceforth, the building remained vacant until undergoing a series of renovations beginning in 2013.

The Old Solano Courthouse was officially reopened in 2014. The Civil/Small Claims Division, Civil Mediation Center, and three courtrooms that mainly hear civil cases are located in the Old Solano Courthouse.

==== Hall of Justice ====
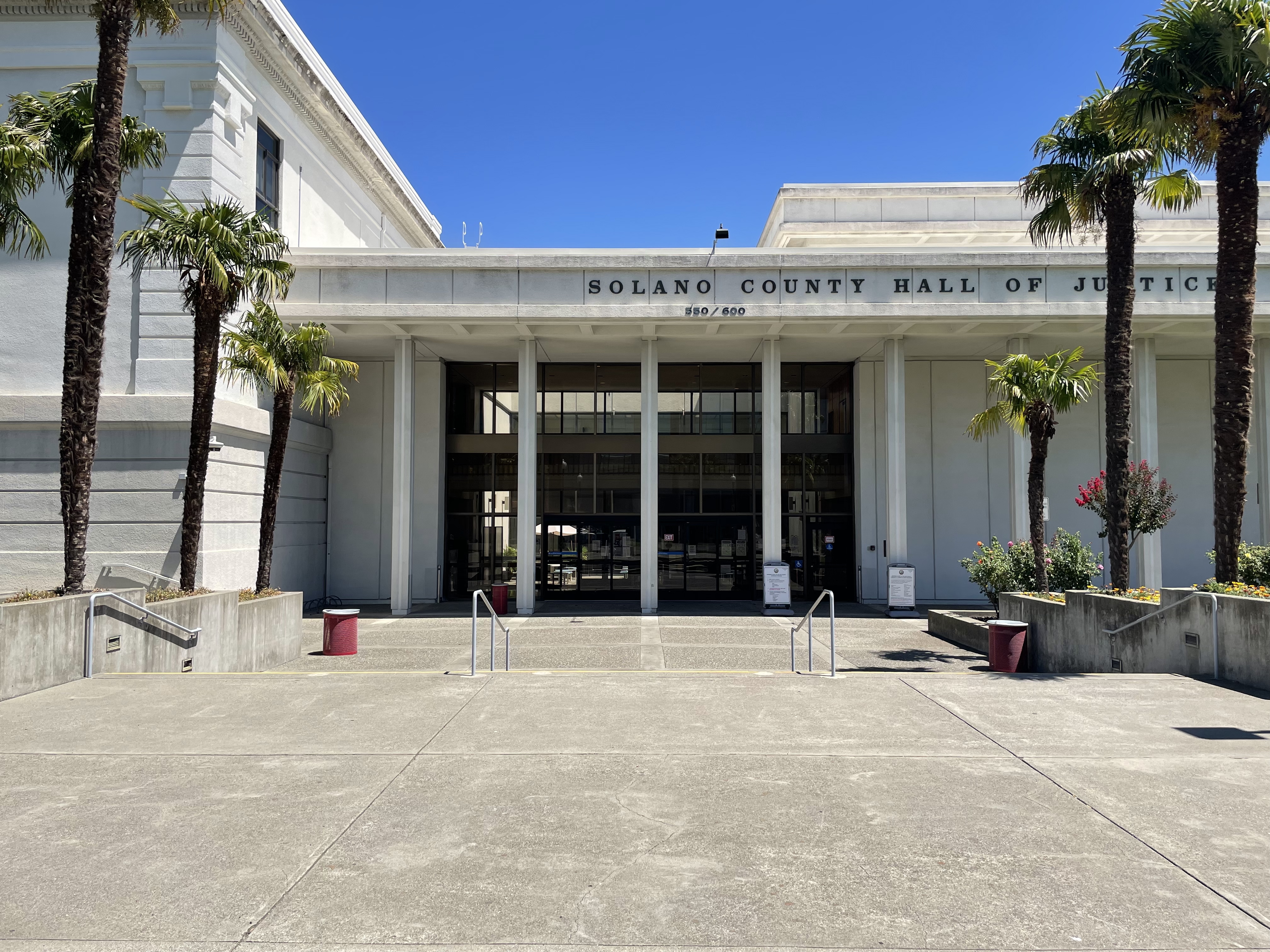
Solano County Hall of Justice in 2022

The Hall of Justice was established in 1970, and is located at 600 Union Avenue in Fairfield, California. Its Neoclassical building (built in 1914) is the former site of Armijo High School. By 1976, a connecting wing was constructed to accommodate more courtrooms and county and court departments. The Family Law/Adoption/Probate Division, Family Law Facilitator, Criminal/Traffic Division, Juvenile Division, Solano County Law Library (an institution established in 1891 and lodged in the Fairfield courthouse that served as the epicenter), eleven courtrooms that mainly hear family or probate law cases, and other departments are located in the Hall of Justice.

==== Law and Justice Center ====
The Law and Justice Center is located at 530 Union Avenue in Fairfield, California. The building, constructed by Hellmuth, Obata & Kassabaum, was established in 1989. The Sheriff's Office and six courtrooms that mainly hear criminal cases are located in the Law and Justice Center.

=== Vallejo ===
==== Solano Justice Center ====
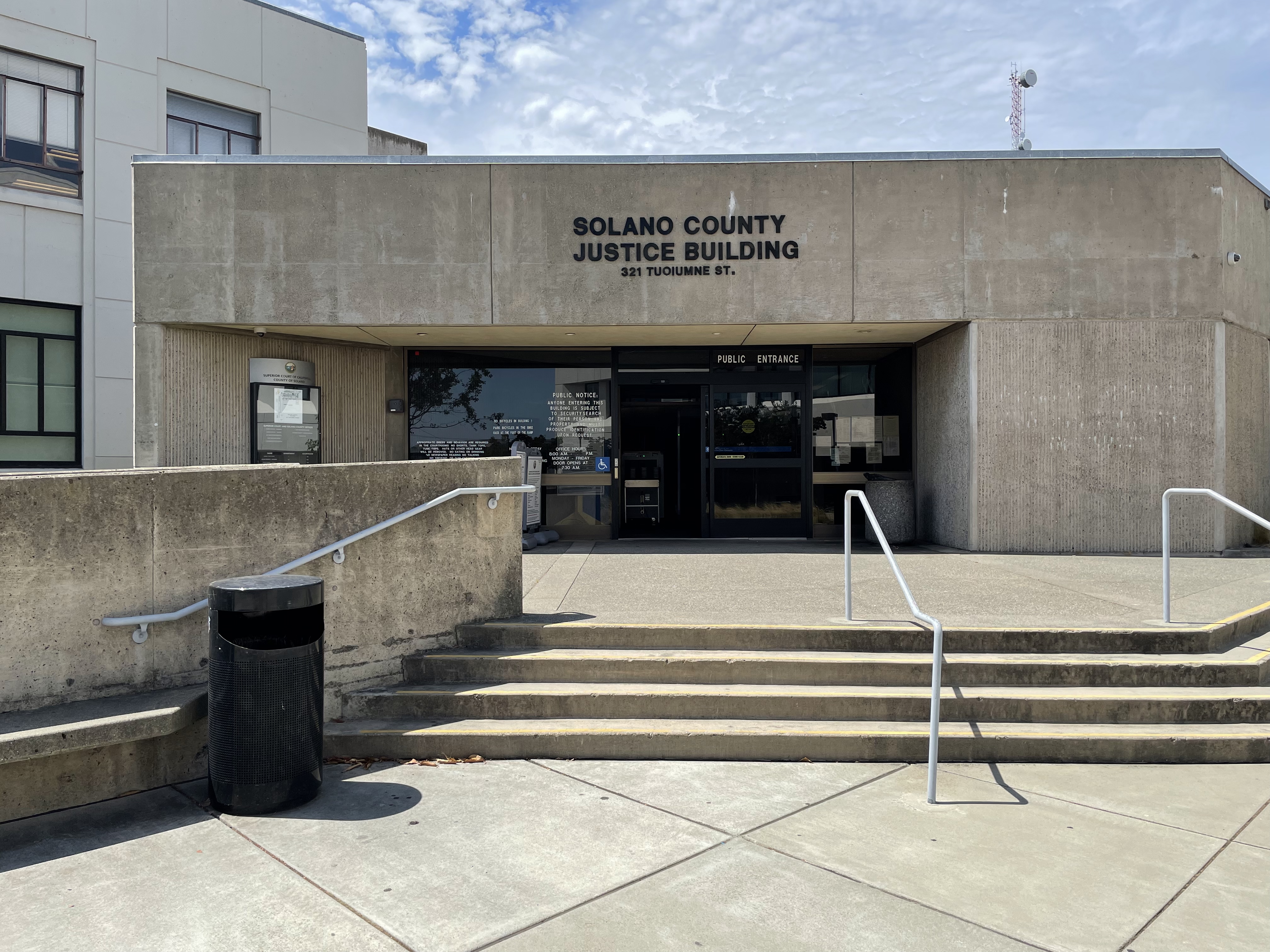
Solano County Justice Building in 2022

Beginning in the 1950s, the Vallejo Municipal Court was located at the Solano County Branch Office Building at 321 Tuolumne Street in Vallejo, California.

By 1974, plans to construct a new justice complex in a vacant parking area behind the county building gained traction. In 1976, the Vallejo Municipal Court moved into what is now called the Solano Justice Center. Constructed by Beland Gianelli and Associates and Lillis and Cooper, the center is located at the same Tuolumne address. The Criminal/Traffic Division, four courtrooms that mainly hear criminal cases, and other court departments are located in the Solano Justice Center.

== Court Executive Officers (1998–present) ==
In Solano County, prior to the consolidation of the municipal and superior courts, there was the Municipal Court Executive Officer who was appointed by the Presiding Judge with the majority of the judges of the court. After the consolidation, the position was henceforth referred to as the Court Executive Officer. California Rule of Court 10.610 states that the Court Executive Officer is responsible for personnel, budgetary, contractual and technological matters, as well as calendar management and jury management. As of 1998, the following Court Executive Officers have served Solano County Superior Court:

- Charles E. Ramey (Municipal Court Executive Officer: 1987–1997; Court Executive Officer: 1998–2005)
- Linda G. Ashcraft (2005–2007)
- Brian K. Taylor (2007–present)

== Judicial Officers (Current) ==
=== Judges ===
Arranged by appointment year, then alphabetically if applicable

- Robert Bowers (2003–present)
- Wendy G. Getty (2006–present)
- Alesia F. Jones (2008–present)
- Tim P. Kam (2010–present)
- John B. Ellis (2011–present)
- Dan J. Healy (2011–present)
- Carlos R. Gutierrez (2016–present)
- William J. Pendergast III (Commissioner: 2011–2017; Judge: 2017-present)
- Dora M. Rios (2017–present) [Solano County's first Latina judge]
- Shauna L. Chastain (2018–present)
- Jeffrey C. Kauffman (2018–present)
- Terrye D. Davis (Judge Pro Tem: 2009–2014; Judge: 2019-)
- Stephen Gizzi (2019–present)
- Stephanie Grogan Jones (2019–present)
- Janice M. Williams (2021–present)
- Christine N. Donovan (2021–present)
- Amyra Cobb-Hampton (2022–present)
- Kelly Trujillo (2024–present)
- Bryan John Kim (Commissioner: 2019–2024; Judge: 2024–)
- Marlo S. Nisperos (2024–present) [Solano County's first Filipino American judge]
- Wendy Casas (2025–present)

=== Commissioners ===
Arranged by appointment year

- David L. Haet (1989–present) [Solano County’s first superior court commissioner]
- Susan A. Rados (2023–present)
- Jennifer Proctor (2024–present)

== Presiding Judges (2000–present) ==
According to California Rules of Court 10.602 and 10.603, the Presiding Judge is chosen by their peers and "elected for an initial term of not less than two years" if the court has three or more judges. With the assistance of the Court Executive Officer, the Presiding Judge's main objectives are to lead the court, establish policies, and allocate resources in order to ensure that the public has access to justice. Since 2000, the following judicial officers have been appointed as the Presiding Judge for Solano County Superior Court:

- William C. Harrison (2000–2001)
- Scott Kays (2002–2003)
- Peter B. Foor (2004–2005)
- David Edwin Power (2006–2007)
- Ramona J. Garrett (2008–2009)
- D. Scott Daniels (2010–2011)
- Paul L. Beeman (2012–2013)
- E. (Earl) Bradley Nelson (2014–2015)
- Robert Fracchia (2016–2017)
- John B. Ellis (2018–2019)
- Donna L. Stashyn (2020–2021)
- Robert S. Bowers (2022)
- Wendy G. Getty (2022-2023)
- Alesia F. Jones (2024–2025)
- William J. Pendergast, III (2026–2027)

== Judicial Officers (Past) ==
The judicial officers, all of whom were elected to office, included the County Judge and the Justices of the Peace. The first County Judge was Joseph Winston (1850) and the last John M. Gregory (who served intermittently from 1873–1884). Solano County’s first superior court judge Abraham Jay Buckles ascended to the bench in 1885.

Initially, upon the creation of Solano County Superior Court in 1884, there was only one superior court judge. Beginning in 1943 (Stats. 1943, ch. 628), the number of judges began to steadily increase. It was during the 1940s that Solano County’s first female judicial officers Ruth Yatsie and Georgia H. Crowley took office, and served as a police judge and justice of the peace respectively. Other municipal court judges that had served in Solano County included Sinclair M. Dobbins, Joseph R. Raftery, Ralph Gibson, Charles Flodin, W.E. Rayn, Wallace W. Cox, Curtis G. Singleton, Donald L. Balding and Richard J. Swan. Commissioners included George W. Brewer.

When the Northern Solano Judicial District was instated, three judges were allowed to serve on the bench due to California Senate Bill 136 (1975). With the passage of Assembly Bill 82 (1984), Northern Solano Judicial District was allowed to have five judges. California law at the time allowed for Solano County to have five superior court judges and three municipal court judges. With the passage of Assembly Bill 511 (1985), the number of judges increased to seven and four respectively. The next significant trend in the number of judicial officers occurred following the consolidation of the municipal and superior courts due to Proposition 220 (1998).

The following judicial officers once served on the Superior Court of California, Solano County (arranged by years of service):

=== Judges ===
- Abraham J. Buckles (1885–1905; 1908–1915) [Solano’s first superior court judge]
- Lewis G. Harrier (1905–1909)
- Frank R. Devlin (1909)
- W. T. O'Donnell (1915–1944)
- Joseph M. Raines (1945–1955)
- Harlow V. Greenwood (1945–1961)
- Raymond J. Sherwin (1956–1977)
- Phillip B. Lynch (1961–1963)
- Thomas N. Healy (1961–1983)
- Ellis R. Randall (1966–1986)
- John DeRonde (1970–1991)
- Victor M. Castagnetto (1971–1978)
- William E. Jensen (Municipal court judge: 1961–1979; Superior Court Judge: 1979-1986)
- Michael L. McInnis (1979–1991)
- F. (Frederick) Paul Dacey (1979–2000)
- Dwight C. Ely (1980–2000)
- Luis M. Villarreal (1982–2005) [Solano County's first Latino judge]
- Richard "Mack" Harris (1983–1998)
- Franklin R. Taft (1985–2003)
- James F. Moelk (1986–2003)
- J. (John) Clinton Peterson (1986–1998)
- Dennis W. Bunting (1987–1994)
- David Edwin Power (1990–2015)
- William C. Harrison (1991–2010)
- Ramona Garrett (1992–2015) [Solano County's first appointed female judge and African American judge]
- Michael E. Nail (1993–2007)
- Harry S. Kinnicutt (1994–2018)
- Eric “Rick” Raymond Uldall (Northern Solano Municipal Court: 1984–1996; Superior Court Judge: 1996-2002)
- Ramona J. Garrett (1997–2015)
- Scott Kays (1997–2017)
- Peter B. Foor (1997–2018)
- R. Michael Smith (Northern Solano Municipal Court Judge: c. 1986–1998; Superior Court Judge: c. 1998-2007)
- Allan P. Carter (1998–2011)
- Garry T. Ichikawa (2000–2017) [Solano County's first Asian American judge]
- Paul L. Beeman (2000–2018)
- Cynda R. Unger (2000–2018) [Solano County's first elected female judge]
- Michael C. Mattice (2003–2020)
- Donna L. Stashyn (Commissioner: 2005–2007; Judge: 2007–2022)
- Robert C. Fracchia (Commissioner: 2005–2008; Judge: 2008-2020)
- D. Scott Daniels (2005–2023)
- E. (Earl) Bradley Nelson (Commissioner: 2007–2008; Judge: 2008-2023)
- Christine A. Carringer (2013–2025)

=== Commissioners ===
- Barbara James (1989–2011) [Solano County's first female commissioner]
- Shelly McEwan (1989-1993)
- J. Paul Coan (1994–2005)
- Alberta Chew (1994–2008)
- Raymond C. Wieser Jr. (1998–2019)
- Robert Q. Warshawsky (2017–2023)

== See also ==
- California superior courts
