= Abram J. Buckles =

American military figure and judge

Abraham Jay Buckles
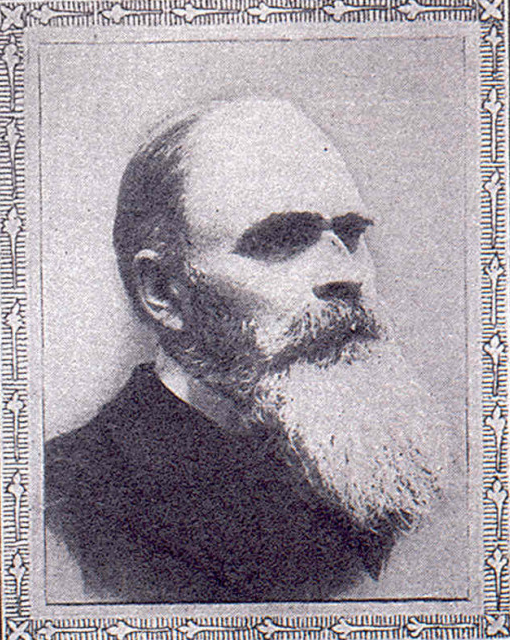
- Born: August 2, 1846; Muncie, Indiana, U.S.
- Died: January 19, 1915 (aged 68); San Bernardino County, California, U.S.
- Burial place: Suisun-Fairfield Cemetery
- Military career
- Allegiance: United States; Union
- Branch: United States Army; Union Army
- Service years: 1862–1865
- Rank: Second Lieutenant
- Unit: 19th Regiment Indiana Volunteer Infantry - Company E
- Conflicts: American Civil War
- Awards: Medal of Honor
- Other work: Lawyer, teacher and judge

Abraham Jay Buckles (August 2, 1846 – January 19, 1915) was an American soldier and jurist. Born near Muncie, Indiana, on August 2, 1846, to Thomas and Rebecca (Graham) Buckles, his first name was often abbreviated as "Abram". Buckles was largely self-educated, and was known for his heroism during the American Civil War and his years of service on the California bench.

On December 15, 1865, he married Louiza/Louisa Conn. Together, they had two daughters, Addie Jessie and Lola B.

== Civil War ==
In 1862, Buckles joined Company E, 19th Indiana Infantry, which was to become part of the "Iron Brigade," First Army Corps of the Army of the Potomac, even though he was only 15 years old. Buckles was wounded by bullets four times during the Civil War: at the Second Battle of Bull Run (thigh); Gettysburg (right shoulder); the Wilderness (body); and the Battle of Hatcher's Run (knee). His right leg was amputated after being shot through the knee at Hatcher's Run, and was discharged from service just 15 days before Lee's surrender. By that time, Buckles was a Second Lieutenant in the 20th Regiment Indiana Infantry (Reorganized).

Buckles left the Army in May 1865 as a 19-year-old man and returned to Indiana. He was later awarded the Medal of Honor for his actions during the Battle of the Wilderness.

== Citation ==
Rank and organization: Sergeant, Company E, 19th Indiana Infantry. Place and date: At Wilderness, Va., 5 May 1864. Entered service at: Muncie, Ind. Birth: Delaware County, Ind. Date of issue: 4 December 1893. Citation: Though suffering from an open wound, carried the regimental colors until again wounded.

== Judge Buckles ==
After his discharge, Buckles became a teacher while he read the law. He was admitted to the Indiana bar, but then moved his family to Dixon, California in 1875. There, he began his legal career. In 1879, he was elected District Attorney of Solano County, a position he retained until 1884, when he became Judge of the Superior Court of Solano County. Governor George Pardee named Buckles to the newly created Court of Appeal, Third Appellate District, in April 1905. Buckles lost the partisan nomination for election to the appellate court in 1906, and left office upon the expiration of his term in 1907. He returned to practice in Fairfield, and in 1908 returned to the bench of the Superior Court of Solano County, where he served for the remainder of his life.

Buckles was actively involved in civic and fraternal organizations. He was elected commander of the Grand Army of the Republic, Department of California and served as Past Grand Chancellor of the Knights of Pythias in California.

== Death ==
Buckles died 11 days after an operation at Ramona Hospital in San Bernardino County on January 19, 1915. He was buried in Suisun-Fairfield Cemetery.

== See also ==
- List of Medal of Honor recipients
