= Zina Pickens Cruse =

American judge

Zina Pickens Cruse (born May 2, 1963) is an American jurist serving as the 20th Judicial Circuit judge in St. Clair County, Illinois, the first African-American woman to serve in the circuit.

== Education and career ==
Cruse graduated from Northeast Missouri State in 1985 with her Bachelors of Science in Business Administration. She then attended law school at Florida State University College of Law and graduated with her Juris Doctor in 1993.

Cruse started a law firm focused on: Family/ Domestic, Criminal, Real Estate, Not-for-Profit organizations and Bankruptcy. Cruse was appointed as an Associate Judge to the 20th Judicial Circuit in 2009 and was elected as a Circuit Judge in 2012.

On January 31, 1998, in Edwardsville, Illinois, Alpha Kappa Alpha sorority, Upsilon Phi Omega chapter was chartered and Cruse was a chartering general member.

== Family ==
Cruse has a daughter with Mark Cruse, Marissa Cruse. The family resides in Belleville, Illinois.
