= Robert H. Jackson =

US Supreme Court justice from 1941 to 1954 (1892–1954)

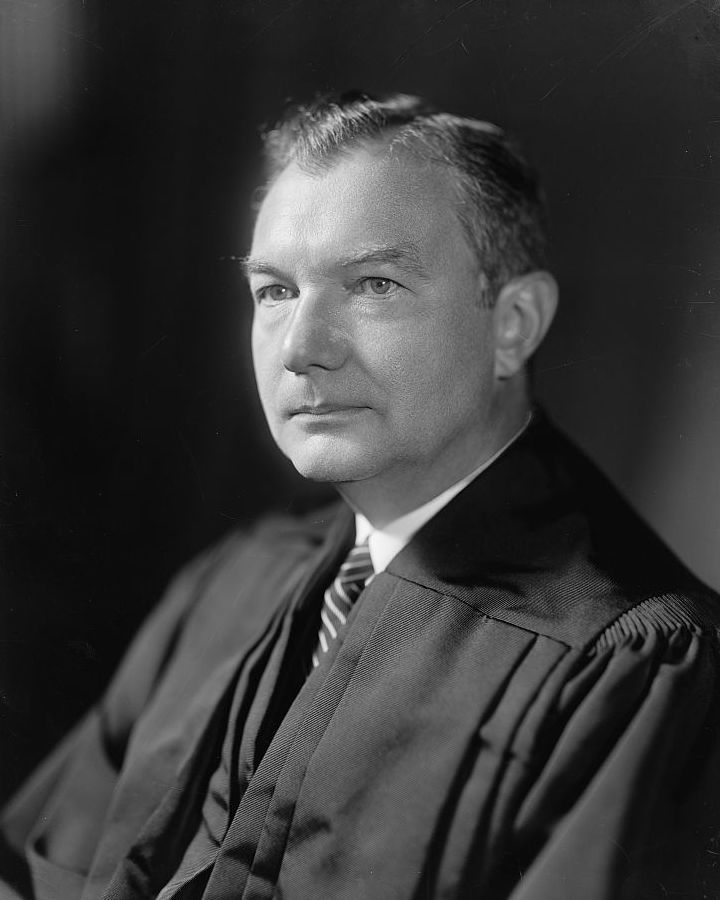
- Jackson, 1905–1945

Associate Justice of the Supreme Court of the United States
- In office July 11, 1941 – October 9, 1954
- Nominated by: Franklin D. Roosevelt
- Preceded by: Harlan F. Stone
- Succeeded by: John Marshall Harlan II

57th United States Attorney General
- In office January 18, 1940 – August 25, 1941
- President: Franklin D. Roosevelt
- Preceded by: Frank Murphy
- Succeeded by: Francis Biddle

24th Solicitor General of the United States
- In office March 5, 1938 – January 18, 1940
- President: Franklin D. Roosevelt
- Preceded by: Stanley Forman Reed
- Succeeded by: Francis Biddle

United States Assistant Attorney General for the Antitrust Division
- In office January 21, 1937 – March 4, 1938
- President: Franklin D. Roosevelt
- Preceded by: John Lord O'Brian
- Succeeded by: Thurman Arnold

United States Assistant Attorney General for the Tax Division
- In office February 26, 1936 – January 21, 1937
- President: Franklin D. Roosevelt
- Preceded by: Frank J. Wideman
- Succeeded by: James W. Morris

Assistant General Counsel for the Bureau of Internal Revenue
- In office February 1, 1934 – February 26, 1936
- President: Franklin D. Roosevelt
- Preceded by: E. Barrett Prettyman
- Succeeded by: Morrison Shafroth

Personal details
- Born: Robert Houghwout Jackson; February 13, 1892 Spring Creek, Pennsylvania, U.S.
- Died: October 9, 1954 (aged 62) Washington, D.C., U.S.
- Resting place: Maple Grove Cemetery, Frewsburg, New York, U.S.
- Party: Democratic
- Spouse: Irene Alice Gerhardt (m. 1916)
- Children: 2
- Education: Albany Law School
- Awards: Medal for Merit

Robert Houghwout Jackson (February 13, 1892 – October 9, 1954) was an American lawyer, jurist, and politician who served as an associate justice of the U.S. Supreme Court from 1941 until his death in 1954. He had previously served as United States Solicitor General and United States Attorney General, and is the only person to have held all three of those offices. Jackson was also notable for his work at the Nuremberg trials prosecuting Nazi war criminals following World War II. Jackson developed a reputation as one of the best writers on the Supreme Court and one of the most committed to enforcing due process as protection from overreaching federal agencies.

Jackson was the most recent U.S. Supreme Court justice who did not earn a law degree. He was admitted to the bar via the older tradition of an internship under an established lawyer ("reading law") after studying at Albany Law School for a year. Jackson is recognized for his advice that, "Any lawyer worth his salt will tell the suspect, in no uncertain terms, to make no statement to the police under any circumstances", and for his aphorism describing the Supreme Court, "We are not final because we are infallible, but we are infallible only because we are final."

He was viewed as a moderate liberal, and is known for his dissents in Terminiello v. City of Chicago, Zorach v. Clauson, Everson v. Board of Education, and Korematsu v. United States, as well as his majority opinion in West Virginia State Board of Education v. Barnette and his concurring opinion in Youngstown Sheet & Tube Co. v. Sawyer. Justice Antonin Scalia, who occupied the seat once held by Jackson, considered Jackson to be "the best legal stylist of the 20th century".

== Early life ==
Jackson was born on February 13, 1892, on his family's farm in Spring Creek Township, Warren County, Pennsylvania, to William Eldred Jackson and Angelina Houghwout. He grew up in Frewsburg, New York. He graduated from Frewsburg High School in 1909, spending the next year as a post-graduate student at Jamestown High School, where he worked to improve his writing skills.

After high school, Jackson decided on a legal career. In early 20th-century America, it was still prevalent to become a lawyer by "reading law" under the tutelage of an established attorney instead of attending university or law school, although the practice was declining. At age 18, Jackson began reading law with the Jamestown, New York, law firm where his uncle, Frank Mott, was a partner. His uncle soon introduced him to Franklin Delano Roosevelt, who was then a member of the New York State Senate and would later become President of the United States in 1933. From 1911 to 1912, Jackson attended classes at Albany Law School. At the time, students at Albany Law School had three options: taking individual courses without receiving a degree; completing a two-year program and receiving a Bachelor of Laws degree; or demonstrating the knowledge required of a first-year student and then taking the second year of the two-year program and receiving a certificate of completion. Jackson chose the third option; he completed the second-year courses and received a certificate of completion in 1912.

After his year at Albany Law School, Jackson returned to Jamestown to complete his studies. He attained admission to the bar in 1913 at age 21, then joined a law practice in Jamestown. In 1916, he married Irene Alice Gerhardt, in Albany. In 1917, Jackson was recruited to work for Penney, Killeen & Nye, a leading Buffalo firm, primarily defending the International Railway Company in trials and appeals. In late 1918, Jackson was recruited back to Jamestown to serve as the city's corporation counsel.

Over the next 15 years, Jackson built a successful practice and became a leading lawyer in New York. He also enhanced his reputation nationally, through leadership roles with bar associations and other legal organizations. In 1930, Jackson was elected to membership in the American Law Institute; in 1933, he was elected Chairman of the American Bar Association's Conference of Bar Association Delegates (a predecessor to today's ABA House of Delegates).

Jackson became active in politics as a Democrat; in 1916, he spearheaded Jamestown's local Wilson for President organization. In the years during and after World War I, he was a member of the New York State Democratic Committee. He also continued his association with Roosevelt; when Roosevelt served as Governor of New York from 1929 to 1933, he appointed Jackson to a commission which reviewed the state judicial system and proposed reforms. He served on that commission from 1931 to 1939. Jackson also turned down Roosevelt's offer to appoint him to the New York Public Service Commission, because he preferred to remain in private practice.

== Federal appointments, 1934–1938 ==
In 1932, Jackson was active in Franklin Roosevelt's presidential campaign as chairman of an organization called Democratic Lawyers for Roosevelt. (Another Robert H. Jackson was also active in the Roosevelt campaign. That Jackson (1880–1973) was Secretary of the Democratic National Committee, and was a resident of New Hampshire.)

In 1934, Jackson agreed to join the Roosevelt administration; he served initially as Assistant General Counsel of the U.S. Treasury Department's Bureau of Internal Revenue (today's Internal Revenue Service), where he was in charge of 300 lawyers who tried cases before the Board of Tax Appeals. In 1936, Jackson became Assistant Attorney General, heading the Tax Division of the Department of Justice, and in 1937, he became Assistant Attorney General, heading the Antitrust Division.

Jackson was a supporter of the New Deal, litigating against corporations and utilities holding companies. He participated in the 1934 prosecution of Samuel Insull, the 1935 income tax case against Andrew Mellon, and the 1937 anti-trust case against Alcoa, in which the Mellon family held an important interest.

== U.S. Solicitor General, 1938–1940 ==
In March 1938, Jackson became United States Solicitor General, succeeding Stanley Forman Reed, who had been appointed to the Supreme Court. Jackson served as Solicitor General until January 1940, working as the government's chief advocate before the U.S. Supreme Court. During his time in this post, he argued 44 cases to the Supreme Court on behalf of the federal government, and lost only six. His record of accomplishment caused Justice Louis Brandeis to once remark that Jackson should be Solicitor General for life.

Roosevelt regarded Jackson as a possible successor to the presidency in 1940, and worked with his staff on an effort to raise Jackson's public profile. Their plan was to mention Jackson favorably in presidential remarks as often as possible, and to have Jackson take part frequently in Roosevelt's public appearances. Roosevelt and his advisers next intended for Jackson to become the Democratic nominee for Governor of New York in 1938. They abandoned their effort to create a groundswell of support for Jackson's gubernatorial candidacy when they ran into resistance from state Democratic Party leaders. In addition, Roosevelt's decision to run for a third term in 1940 rendered moot the need to identify and promote a successor. Instead of running for Governor or President, Jackson joined Roosevelt's cabinet when he was appointed as Attorney General.

== U.S. Attorney General, 1940–1941 ==
Jackson was appointed as United States Attorney General by Roosevelt, on January 4, 1940, replacing Frank Murphy, whom Roosevelt had appointed to the Supreme Court. As Attorney General, Jackson supported a bill introduced by Sam Hobbs that would have legalized wiretapping by the Federal Bureau of Investigation, or any other government agency, if it was suspected that a felony was occurring. The bill was opposed by Federal Communications Commission (FCC) chairman James Lawrence Fly, and it did not pass. While in office, he also helped President Roosevelt organize the Lend-Lease agreement, which allowed the United States to supply materials to help with the war effort to the Allied forces, before formally entering World War II.

In his 1940 speech "The Federal Prosecutor", Jackson emphasized the importance of maintaining consistent policies and balancing federal oversight with local independence. Moreover, he stressed that prosecutors must act with integrity, fairness, and restraint, focusing on prosecuting crimes rather than targeting individuals. Later, the speech was widely praised and repeatedly cited by Attorneys General across administrations as an expression of Department of Justice values, though these institutional traditions have arguably eroded under increased presidential control.

== U.S. Supreme Court, 1941–1954 ==
On June 12, 1941, Roosevelt nominated Jackson as an associate justice of the U.S. Supreme Court, to fill the vacancy created when Harlan Fiske Stone replaced Charles Evans Hughes as chief justice. Jackson was confirmed by the United States Senate on July 7, 1941, and took the judicial oath of office on July 11, 1941. On the Court, he was known for his eloquent writing style and championing of individual liberties.

In 1943, Jackson wrote the majority opinion in West Virginia State Board of Education v. Barnette, which overturned a public school regulation making it mandatory to salute the flag, and imposing penalties of expulsion and prosecution upon students who failed to comply. Jackson's stirring language in Barnette concerning individual rights is widely quoted. Jackson's concurring opinion in 1952's Youngstown Sheet & Tube Co. v. Sawyer (forbidding President Harry Truman's seizure of steel mills during the Korean War to avert a strike), in which Jackson formulated a three-tier test for evaluating claims of Presidential power, remains one of the most widely cited opinions in Supreme Court history.

=== Feud with Hugo Black ===
Justices Jackson and Hugo Black had profound professional and personal disagreements dating back to October 1941, the first term during which they served together on the Supreme Court. According to Dennis Hutchinson, editor of The Supreme Court Review, Jackson objected to Black's practice of importing his personal preferences into his jurisprudence. Hutchinson quotes Jackson as having remarked, "With few exceptions, we all knew which side of a case Black would vote on when he read the names of the parties." While Hutchinson points out that Jackson objected to Black's style of jurisprudence in such cases as Minersville v. Gobitis (1940) and United States v. Bethlehem Steel (1942), Black's involvement in the Jewell Ridge case struck Jackson as especially injudicious.

In Jewell Ridge Coal Corp. v. Mine Workers (1945), the Supreme Court faced the issue of whether to grant the coal company's petition for a rehearing, on the grounds that the victorious miners were, in a previous matter, represented by Crampton P. Harris, who was Justice Black's former law partner and personal lawyer. Despite this apparent conflict of interest, Black lobbied the Court for a per curiam denial of the petition. Justice Jackson objected, with the result that Jackson filed a concurrence disassociating himself from the ruling and, by implication, criticizing Black for not addressing the conflict of interest. Jackson also strongly objected to Black's judicial conduct in Jewell Ridge for another reason. As Jackson later alleged, while Justice Murphy was preparing his opinion, Black urged that the Court hand down its decision without waiting for the opinion and dissent. In Jackson's eyes, the "...only apparent reason behind this proposal was to announce the decision in time to influence the contract negotiations during the coal strike" between the coal company and the miners, which were taking place at the time.

Jackson probably regarded Black's conduct as unbecoming of a Supreme Court Justice in another related matter. On April 3, 1945, the Southern Conference for Human Welfare held a dinner, at which it honored Justice Black as the 1945 recipient of the Thomas Jefferson Award. Fred M. Vinson spoke at the dinner. While Jackson declined an invitation to the event, citing a conflict arising out of the fact that a number of leading sponsors of the dinner were then litigants before the Supreme Court, Black attended the dinner and received his award. Crampton Harris, counsel in two pending cases, Jewell Ridge and CIO v. McAdory (1945), was one of the sponsors.

Jackson later took these grievances public in two cables from Nuremberg. Jackson had informally been promised the Chief Justiceship by Roosevelt; however, the seat came open while Jackson was in Germany, and Roosevelt was dead. President Harry S. Truman was faced with two factions, one recommending Jackson for the seat, and the other advocating for Hugo Black. In an attempt to avoid controversy, Truman appointed Vinson. Jackson blamed machinations by Black for his being passed over for the seat, and publicly exposed some of Black's controversial behavior and feuding within the Court. The controversy was heavily covered in the press, casting the New Deal Court in a negative light, and had the effect of tarnishing Jackson's reputation in the years that followed.

On June 8, 1946, Jackson sent a cable to President Truman. Jackson's cable to Truman began with an insincere offer of congratulations to the President for his appointment of Vinson. However, the cable then quickly addressed the rumor, which Jackson had gotten wind of in Nuremberg, according to which Truman had appointed Fred Vinson, in part, to avert a resignation on the part of Justice Black. Rumors had been circulating in Washington that Black would resign in the event that Truman chose Jackson as Chief Justice Stone's successor. "I would be loath to believe that you would concede to any man a veto over court appointments." Jackson closed his cable by stating that he could not continue his service as an Associate Justice under Vinson if an associate "had something on [him]", which would disqualify him from serving, or if he, Truman, regarded Jackson's opinion in the Jewell Ridge case as a "gratuitous insult" to Justice Black.

After receiving a response from Truman in which he denied having given consideration to, or having even heard of, the rumor of Black's threatened resignation, Jackson rashly fired off a second cable to Congress, on June 10. This cable stated Jackson's reasons for his belief that Justice Black faced a conflict of interest in Jewell Ridge, from which he wrongfully, at least, in Jackson's eyes, did not recuse himself, and ended with Jackson's threat that if such a practice "is ever repeated while I am on the bench, I will make my Jewell Ridge opinion look like a letter of recommendation by comparison."

=== Dennis v. United States ===
==== "Clear and present danger" test ====
In 1919, the Supreme Court decided Schenck v. United States. In Schenck, the petitioners, members of the Socialist Party, were convicted of violating the Espionage Act of 1917 for printing and distributing circulars asserting that American citizens had a right to oppose the draft during World War I because, among other things, it violated the United States Constitution. The Schenck decision promulgated the "clear and present danger test," which provided the standard for sustaining a conviction when speech is relied upon as evidence that an offense has been committed. Justice Holmes, writing for a unanimous court, affirmed the decision of the lower court positing:

We admit that, in many places and in ordinary times, the defendants, in saying all that was said in the circular, would have been within their constitutional rights. But the character of every act depends upon the circumstances in which it is done ... The question in every case is whether the words used are used in such circumstances, and are of such a nature as to create a "clear and present danger" that they will bring about the substantive evils that Congress has a right to prevent. It is a question of proximity and degree.

==== Background ====
In 1951, the Supreme Court decided Dennis v. United States. In Dennis, the petitioners were zealous Communists who organized for the purpose of teaching the "Marxist-Leninist Doctrine." The principal texts used to teach the doctrine were: History of the Communist Party of the Soviet Union; Foundations of Leninism by Stalin; The Communist Manifesto by Marx and Engels; and State and Revolution by Lenin. The Petitioners were convicted for violating clause 2 and clause 3 of the Smith Act which, among other things, made it unlawful to conspire to organize a group which advocates the overthrow of the United States government by force or violence. The issue before the Supreme Court was "[w]hether either §2 or §3 of the Smith Act, inherently, or as construed and applied in the instant case, violates the First Amendment and other provisions of the Bill of Rights ..."

==== Jackson's concurrence ====
In Dennis, Jackson concluded that the "clear and present danger test" should not be applied. To this end, Jackson analyzed: the effect Communism had outside the United States; the nature of Communists; and the problems with applying the test. Jackson's analysis can be summarized as follows:

On the effect that Communists historically had on foreign countries, Jackson analyzed their effect on Czechoslovakia. In Czechoslovakia, a Communist organization disguised as a competing political faction secretly established its roots in key control positions "of police and information services." During a period of national crisis, a clandestine Communist organization appeared and overthrew the Czechoslovak government. Establishing control of mass communication and industry, the Communist organization's rule was one of "oppression and terror." Ironically, as Jackson points out, the Communist organization suppressed the very freedoms which made its conspiracy possible.

On the nature of Communists, Jackson characterized them as an extraordinarily dedicated and highly selective group, disciplined and indoctrinated by Communist policy. The goal of Party members is to secretly infiltrate key positions of government, industry, and unions and to leverage their power once in such positions. Jackson goes on to say that, although "Communist[s] have no scruples against sabotage, terrorism, assassination, or mob disorder," they "advocate force only when prudent," which "may never be necessary, because infiltration and deception may be enough."

On the problems with applying the clear and present danger test in Dennis, Jackson deemed significant that the test was authored "before the era of World War II revealed the subtlety and efficacy of modernized revolutionary technique used by totalitarian parties." Jackson believed that the application of the test should be limited to cases bearing strong enough likeness to those for which it was originally crafted – i.e., "...criminality of hot-headed speech on a street corner, or parading by some zealots behind a red flag, or refusal of a handful of Jehovah Witness school children to salute our flag." Expressing strong concern that the expansive construction the Court had recently given the test in Bridges v. California, Jackson asserted that the test provided Communists with "unprecedented immunities," while the "Government is captive in a judge-made verbal trap." Jackson goes on to describe the application of the test to Communists, when determining the constitutionality of the Smith Act facially, or as applied as one of "...apprais[ing] imponderables, including international and national phenomena, which baffle the best informed foreign offices and our most experienced politicians."

Jackson concludes his First Amendment analysis in Dennis by asserting that:

The authors of the "clear and present danger test" never applied it to a case like this, nor would I. If applied as it is proposed here, it means that the Communist plotting is protected during its period of incubation; its preliminary stages of organization and preparation are immune from the law; the Government can move only after imminent action is manifest, when it would, of course, be too late.

==== Conclusion ====
In the end, the Court applied its own version of the "clear and present danger test" in Dennis, essentially disregarding the analytical elements of probability and temporality which had previously appeared to be requirements of the doctrine. Jackson, however, as one commentator put it, expressed in Dennis (at least with regards to Communists) that, "when used as part of a conspiracy to act illegally, speech loses its First Amendment protection."

=== Korematsu v. United States ===
==== Background ====
Following the Japanese attack on Pearl Harbor on December 7, 1941, there was great suspicion surrounding Japanese-Americans, particularly those residing on the West Coast of the United States. Roosevelt issued Executive Order 9066 on February 19, 1942, giving the War Department permission to declare some zones "military zones" in which they could prohibit certain people from accessing prescribed areas. With this executive order, the War Department was able to declare that all United States citizens of Japanese ancestry were prohibited from areas in California that were deemed unsafe for Japanese-American habitation for national security purposes, and it forced them into internment camps.

Fred Korematsu, born to Japanese parents on American soil, believed that this was an unconstitutional infringement on an individual's civil liberty. The question that came before the Supreme Court was whether the Executive and Legislative branches went beyond their war powers by depriving citizens of rights with no criminal basis.

==== Jackson's dissent ====
The Supreme Court decided that the President and Congress did not stretch their war powers too far by choosing national security over an individual's rights in a time of war. Justice Hugo Black wrote the majority opinion for this case, and Jackson wrote a dissenting opinion. The opening paragraph of Jackson's dissent illustrated his view of the case:

Korematsu was born on our soil, of parents born in Japan. The Constitution makes him a citizen of the United States by nativity, and a citizen of California by residence. No claim is made that he is not loyal to this country. There is no suggestion that apart from the matter involved here, he is not law-abiding and well- disposed. Korematsu, however, has been convicted of an act not commonly a crime. It consists merely of being present in the state whereof he is a citizen, near the place where he was born, and where all his life he has lived.

Jackson warned of the danger that this great allowance of executive power presented, through the War Department's ability to deprive individuals of their rights in favor of national security in time of war:

But if we cannot confine military expedients by the Constitution, neither would I distort the Constitution to approve all that the military may deem expedient. That is what the Court appears to be doing, whether consciously or not. I cannot say, from any evidence before me, that the orders of General DeWitt were not reasonably expedient military precautions, nor could I say that they were. But even if they were permissible military procedures, I deny that it follows that they are constitutional. If, as the Court holds, it does follow, then we may as well say that any military order will be constitutional, and have done with it.

Jackson was not concerned in evaluating the validity of DeWitt's claim that the internment of Japanese citizens on the West Coast was necessary for national security purposes, but whether this would set a precedent of war-time racial discrimination that would be used to strip individual liberties.

But once a judicial opinion rationalizes such an order to show that it conforms to the Constitution, or rather rationalizes the Constitution to show that the Constitution sanctions such an order, the Court for all time has validated the principles of racial discrimination in criminal procedure, and of transplanting American citizens. The principle then lies about like a loaded weapon, ready for the hand of any authority that can bring forward a plausible claim of an urgent need. Every repetition imbeds that principle more deeply in our law and thinking, and expands it to new purposes.

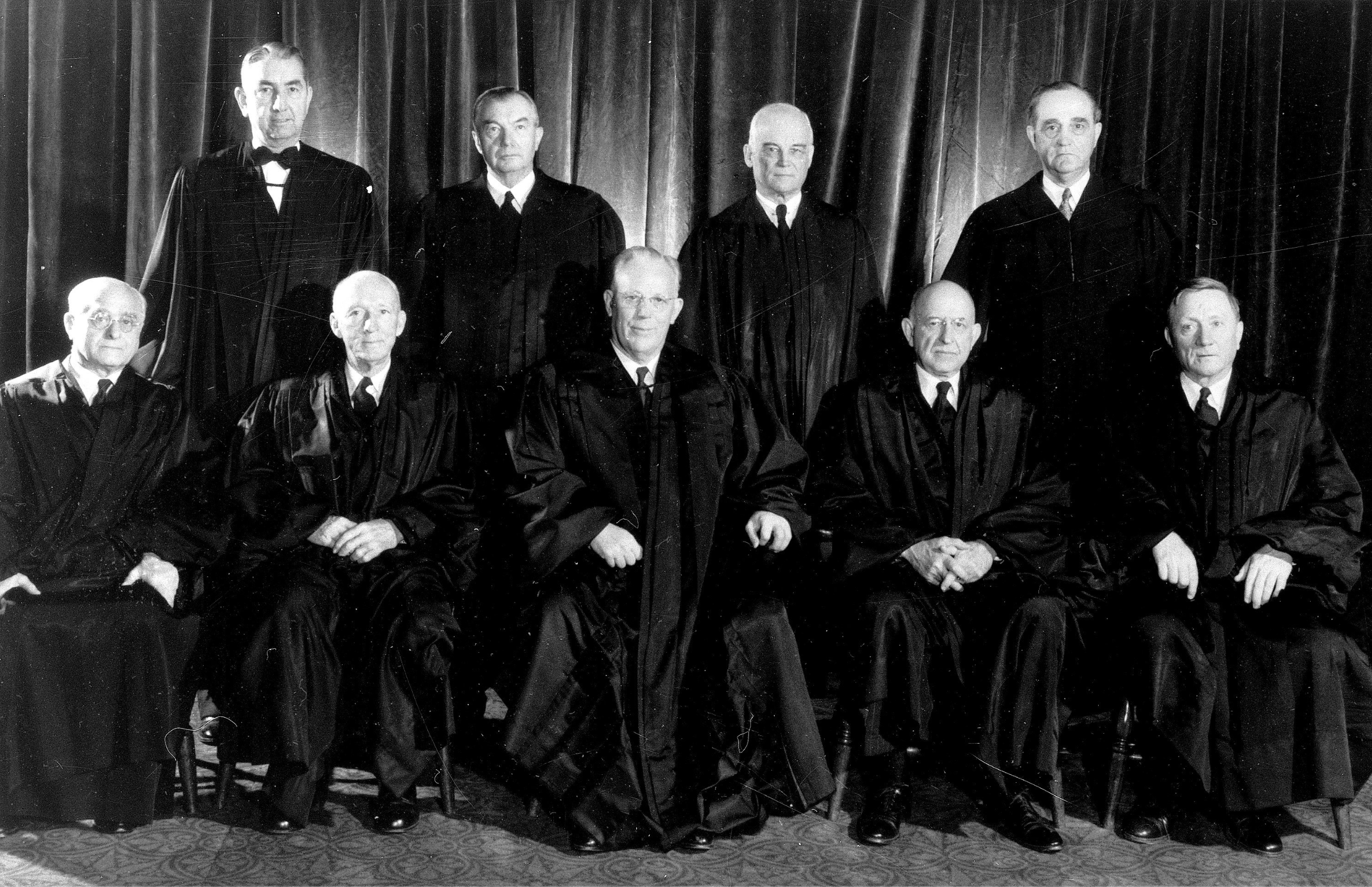
Robert H. Jackson, Associate Justice of the Supreme Court, in 1953: second from the left, in the back row. Also pictured are, from the left, in the bottom row: Felix Frankfurter; Hugo Black; Earl Warren (Chief Justice); Stanley Reed; William O. Douglas. In the back row, from left: Tom Clark; Robert H. Jackson; Harold Burton; Sherman Minton

=== Brown v. Board of Education ===
One of Jackson's law clerks during 1952 – 53, William H. Rehnquist, was appointed to the Supreme Court in 1971, and became chief justice in 1986. In December 1971, after Rehnquist's nomination had been approved by the Senate Judiciary Committee and was pending before the full Senate, a 1952 memorandum came to light that he had written as Jackson's law clerk in connection with the landmark case Brown v. Board of Education that argued in favor of affirming the separate-but-equal doctrine of Plessy v. Ferguson. Rehnquist wrote a brief letter attributing the views to Jackson, and was confirmed. In his 1986 hearing, he was questioned about the matter. His explanation of the memorandum was disputed in both 1971 and 1986 by Jackson's former secretary, and scholars have questioned its plausibility. However, the papers of Justices Douglas and Frankfurter indicate that Jackson voted for Brown in 1954 only after changing his mind.

The views of Justice Jackson about Brown can be found in his 1954 unpublished draft concurrence. The "Memorandum by Mr. Justice Jackson, March 15th, 1954", is available with Jackson's papers in the Library of Congress, but did not become publicly available until after Rehnquist's 1986 hearing for chief justice. Jackson's draft concurrence in Brown, divided into four parts, shows how he struggled with how to write an effective opinion to strike down segregation. In Part 1 of Jackson's draft concurrence in Brown, he wrote that he went to school where "Negro pupils were very few" and that he was "predisposed to the conclusion that segregation elsewhere has outlived whatever justification it may have had." Despite his own opinions regarding desegregation, Jackson acknowledged the inability of the Court to "eradicate" the "fears, prides and prejudices" that made segregation an important social practice in the South. Jackson thus concluded that the Northerners on the Court should be sensitive to the conditions that brought segregation to the South.

In Part 2 of the draft memorandum, Jackson described the legal framework for forbidding segregation in "Does Existing Law Condemn Segregation?". Jackson notes that it was difficult for the Court, which expected "not to make new law, but only to declare existing law," to overturn a decision of such longevity as Plessy. Looking at the doctrine of original intent with regard to the Fourteenth Amendment, Jackson found no evidence that segregation was prohibited, particularly since states that had ratified the Fourteenth Amendment had segregated schools at the time. Jackson concluded, "I simply cannot find in the conventional material of constitutional interpretation any justification for saying" that segregated schools violated the Fourteenth Amendment.

Part 3 of the draft memorandum, titled "Enforcement Power Limits", describes enforcement by Congress of the Fourteenth Amendment. Jackson addressed the possibility of leaving enforcement to Congress, particularly because the "courts have no power to enforce general declarations of law." Jackson noted that while segregation was already fading in some states, it would be difficult to overcome in those states where segregation was firmly established. While Jackson recognized the difficulties in the Supreme Court enforcing its judgment, he did not want the task to be left to the lower courts, as suggested by the Government. Jackson concluded that the Court must act because "our representative system has failed", and even though this "premise is not a sound basis for judicial action."

Finally, in Part 4 of the draft memorandum, "Changed Conditions", Jackson began by stating that prior to Brown, segregation was legal. According to Jackson, the premise for overruling Plessy was the now erroneous "factual assumption" that "there were differences between the Negro and the white races, viewed as a whole." The draft asserted that the "spectacular" progress of African-Americans, under adverse circumstances, "enabled [them] to outgrow the system and to overcome the presumptions on which it was based." Jackson emphasized that the changed conditions, along with the importance of a public education, required the Court to strike down the concept of "separate but equal" in public education. While Jackson could not justify the decision in Brown in law, he did so on the basis of a political and social imperative. It is unknown if Jackson ever intended to publish this concurrence.

Jackson was in the hospital from March 30 to May 17, 1954. It is reported that Chief Justice Warren visited Jackson in the hospital several times, and discussed both Jackson's draft opinion and Warren's drafts. One suggestion that Warren took from Jackson was adding the following sentence: "Negroes have achieved outstanding success in the arts and sciences, as well as in the business and professional world." This quote is tied to the arguments in Part 4 of Jackson's draft opinion. On May 17, 1954, Jackson went to the Court from the hospital, so that he could be there the day that the Brown decision was handed down. When the Brown decision was handed down, a full court was present, to emphasize the unanimity of the decision. Robert H. Jackson died on October 9, 1954, and so there was not enough time between Brown and the death of Jackson to fully explore his views on desegregation.

=== Procedural due process ===
Jackson was a staunch defender (along with Felix Frankfurter) of procedural due process, for the rule of law that protects members of the public from overreaching by government agencies. One of his hymns to due process is often quoted:

Procedural fairness, if not all that originally was meant by due process of law, is at least what it most uncompromisingly requires. Procedural due process is more elemental and less flexible than substantive due process. It yields less to the times, varies less with conditions, and defers much less to legislative judgment. Insofar as it is technical law, it must be a specialized responsibility within the competence of the judiciary on which they do not bend before political branches of the Government, as they should on matters of policy which compromise substantive law. If it be conceded that in some way [the agency could take the action it did], does it matter what the procedure is? Only the untaught layman or the charlatan lawyer can answer that procedure matters not. Procedural fairness and regularity are of the indispensable essence of liberty. Severe substantive laws can be endured if they are fairly and impartially applied. Indeed, if put to the choice, one might well prefer to live under Soviet substantive law applied in good faith by our common-law procedures, than under our substantive law enforced by Soviet procedural practices. Let it not be overlooked that due process of law is not for the sole benefit of an accused. It is the best insurance for the Government itself against those blunders which leave lasting stains on a system of justice but which are bound to occur on ex parte consideration.

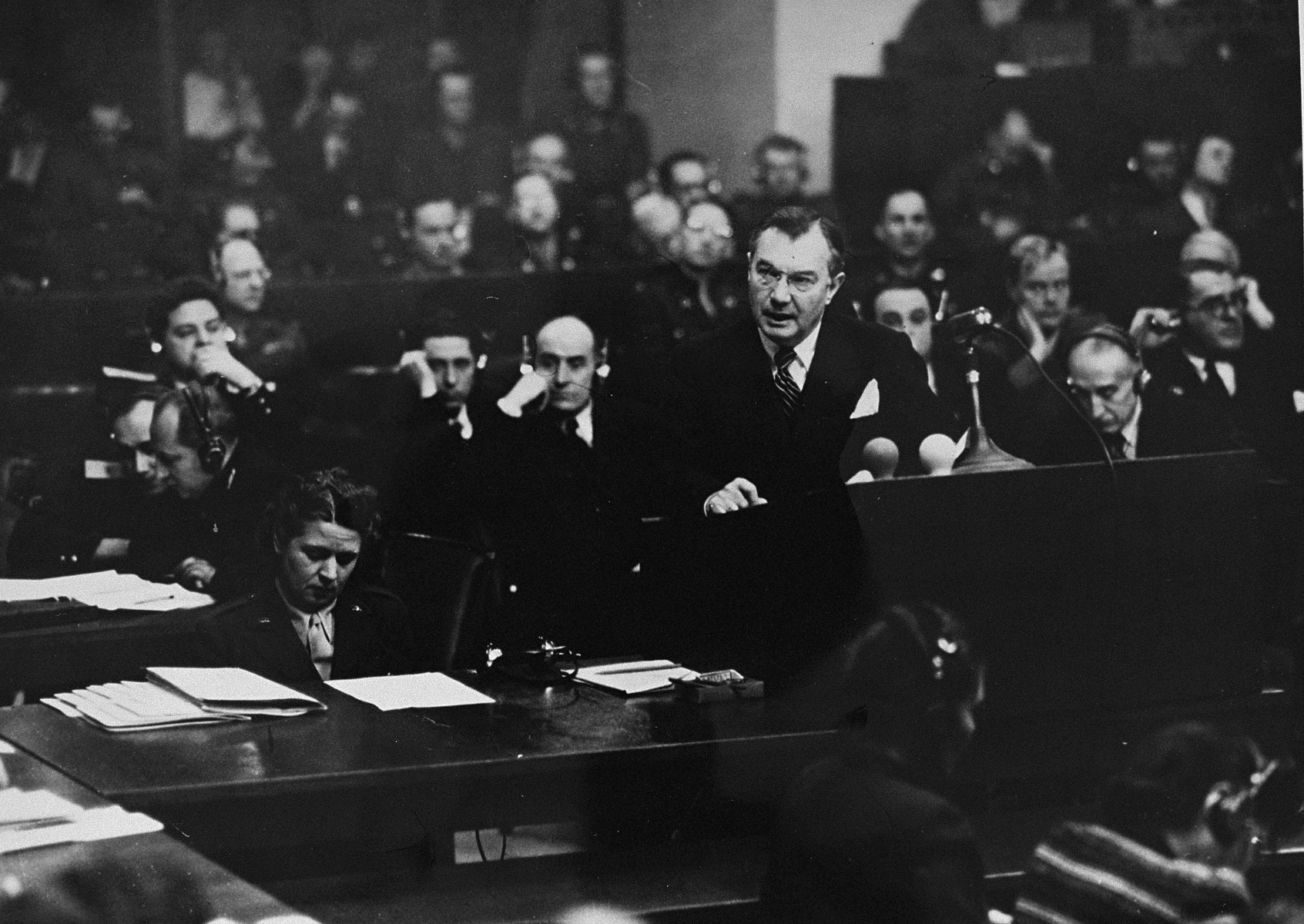
Chief U.S. Prosecutor at the International Military Tribunal, Nuremberg, Germany, Robert H. Jackson,1945-46

== International Military Tribunal, 1945–1946 ==
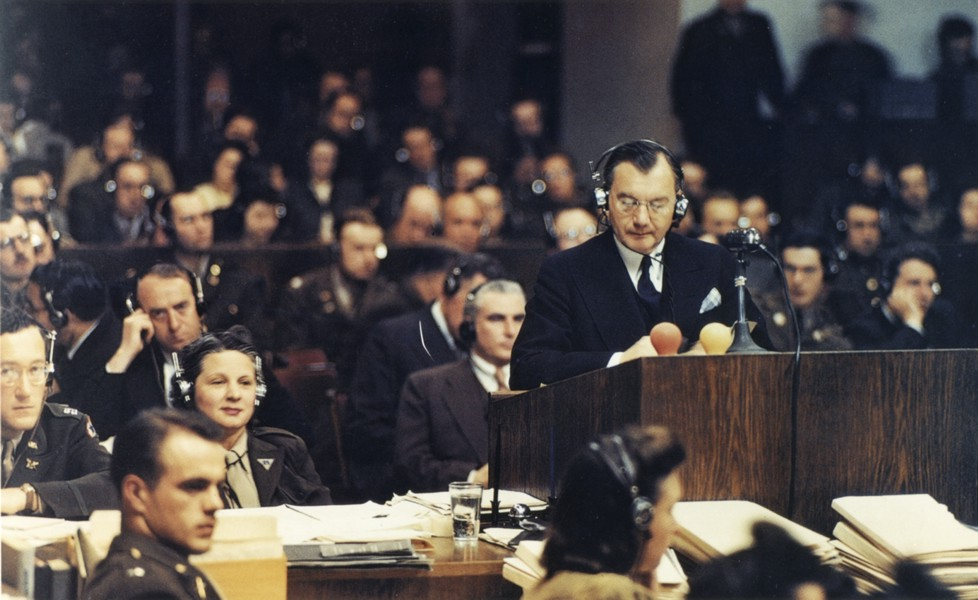
Robert H. Jackson, Chief U.S. Prosecutor at the International Military Tribunal in Nuremberg, Germany, 1945–46

In 1945, President Harry S. Truman appointed Jackson (who took a leave of absence from the Supreme Court), as U.S. Chief of Counsel for the prosecution of Nazi war criminals. He helped draft the London Charter of the International Military Tribunal, which created the legal basis for the Nuremberg Trials. He then served in Nuremberg, Germany, as United States Chief Prosecutor at the International Military Tribunal. Jackson pursued his prosecutorial role with a great deal of vigor. His opening and closing arguments before the Nuremberg court were widely celebrated. In the words of defendant Albert Speer, the Nazi Minister of Armaments and War Production,

The trial began with the grand, devastating opening address by the Chief American Prosecutor, Justice Robert H. Jackson. But I took comfort from one sentence in it which accused the defendants of guilt for the regime's crimes, but not the German people.

However, some believe that his cross-examination skills were generally weak, and it was British prosecutor David Maxwell Fyfe who got the better of Hermann Göring in cross-examination, rather than Jackson, who was rebuked by the Tribunal for losing his temper and being repeatedly baited by Göring during the proceedings.

== Death ==
On March 30, 1954, Jackson suffered a massive heart attack at the apartment of his secretary, Elsie Douglas. He was confined to the hospital until May 17 when he returned to the Court for the announcement of the Brown decision. He remained functioning in his position as Justice until October 4, 1954. On Saturday, October 9, 1954, Jackson had another heart attack; at 11:45 a.m. he died aged 62. Funeral services were held in Washington's National Cathedral and later in Jamestown's St. Luke's Church. All eight of the other Supreme Court Justices traveled together to Jamestown, New York, to attend his funeral service; the last time, for security purposes, that the Supreme Court all traveled together. Other prominent guests included Thomas E. Dewey. He was interred near his boyhood home in Frewsburg, New York. His headstone reads "He kept the ancient landmarks and built the new."

Jackson was the last justice to die while in active service to the Court until the passing of his former law clerk, William Rehnquist, on September 3, 2005, and the last sitting Associate Justice to die until Antonin Scalia — who occupied the seat Jackson once held — on February 13, 2016.

== Legacy ==
The Robert H. Jackson Center in Jackson's hometown of Jamestown, New York, offers guided tours to visitors who can see exhibits on Jackson's life, collections of his writings, and photos from the International Military Tribunal. An extensive collection of Jackson's personal and judicial papers is archived at the Manuscript Division of the Library of Congress and is open for research. Smaller collections are available at several other repositories.

There are statues dedicated to Jackson outside the Robert H. Jackson Center in Jamestown, New York, as well as the Robert H. Jackson field at the Chautauqua County-Jamestown Airport. The United States District Court for the Western District of New York main courthouse, which is located in Buffalo and opened in November 2011, is dedicated to Jackson and is named the Robert H. Jackson United States Courthouse.

=== Honors and awards ===
- Awarded the Medal for Merit by President Harry Truman on February 7, 1947.

=== In film and fiction ===
On screen, Jackson has been portrayed by:

- Andrzej Łapicki (1970) Epilog norymberski (Polish TV production)
- Henderson Forsythe (1991) Separate but Equal (telefilm)
- Alec Baldwin (2000) Nuremberg (Canadian/U.S. TV production); this series adds a fictional subplot in which Jackson is having a love affair with assistant Elsie Douglas.
- Edmund Dehn (2005) Speer und Er (German TV miniseries)
- Colin Stinton (2006) Nuremberg: Nazis on Trial (British television docudrama)
- Michael Shannon (2025) Nuremberg (U.S. film)

== See also ==
- List of justices of the Supreme Court of the United States
- List of United States Supreme Court cases by the Stone Court
- List of United States Supreme Court cases by the Vinson Court
- List of United States Supreme Court cases by the Warren Court
- Separation of powers under the United States Constitution

== Bibliography ==
- Abraham, Henry J., Justices and Presidents: A Political History of Appointments to the Supreme Court. 3d ed. New York, NY: Oxford University Press, 1992. ISBN 0-19-506557-3.
- Cushman, Clare, The Supreme Court Justices: Illustrated Biographies, 1789–1995 (2nd ed.) (Supreme Court Historical Society). Congressional Quarterly Books, 2001 ISBN 1-56802-126-7; ISBN 978-1-56802-126-3.
- Department of State. Report of Robert H. Jackson, United States Representative, to the International Conference on Military Trials. CreateSpace Independent Publishing Platform, 2013.
- Frank, John P., The Justices of the United States Supreme Court: Their Lives and Major Opinions (Leon Friedman and Fred L. Israel, eds.). New York, NY: Chelsea House Publishers, 1995 ISBN 0-7910-1377-4, ISBN 978-0-7910-1377-9.
- Gerhart, Eugene. Robert H. Jackson: Country Lawyer, Supreme Court Justice, America's Advocate. Getzville, NY: William S. Hein & Co., 2003. ISBN 1575887738, ISBN 978-1575887739.
- Harris, Whitney. Tyranny on Trial: The Trial of the Major German War Criminals at the End of World War II, at Nuremberg, Germany, 1945-46. College Station, TX: Texas A & M University Press, 1999 ISBN 0870744364, ISBN 978-0870744365.
- Hockett, Jeffrey D.. New Deal Justice: The Constitutional Jurisprudence of Hugo L. Black, Felix Frankfurter, and Robert H. Jackson. Lanham, MD: Rowman & Littlefield Publishers, 1996 ISBN 0-8476-8210-2 ISBN 9780847682102.
- Jackson, Robert H. The Case Against the Nazi War Criminals. New York, NY: Alfred A. Knopf, 1946.
- Jackson, Robert H. FBI Law Enforcement Bulletin, Volume 9, No. 3, March 1940. Federal Bureau of Investigation.
- Jackson, Robert H. General Welfare and Industrial Prosperity: Address prepared by Robert H. Jackson, Solicitor General of the United States, for Delivery at the Convention in Rockford, Illinois, on September 14th, 1938. The Department of Justice, 1938.
- Jackson, Robert. The Meaning of Liberalism: An Address by Robert H. Jackson to the Liberal Voters' League of Montgomery Co., MD, Rockville, MD, November 22nd, 1938. 1938.
- Jackson, Robert H. The Nürnberg Case, as Presented by Robert H. Jackson. New York, NY: Alfred A. Knopf, 1947.
- Jackson, Robert H. The Reminiscences of Robert H. Jackson. Washington, D.C.: Supreme Court of United States, 1955.
- Jackson, Robert H. Struggle for Judicial Supremacy. New York, NY: Alfred A. Knopf, 1941.
- Jackson, Robert H. (1955). The Supreme Court in the American System of Government. Cambridge, MA: Harvard University Press – via Internet Archive.
- Jackson, Robert H. Statement by Robert H. Jackson to the Judiciary Committee of the Senate. The Department of Justice, 1937.
- Jackson, Robert H. That Man: An Insider's Portrait of Franklin D. Roosevelt. John Q. Barrett, ed.. New York, NY: Oxford University Press, 2003. ISBN 0195168267.
- Jackson, Robert H. Trial of German War Criminals: Opening Address by Robert H. Jackson. Literacy Licensing, LLC, 2003. ISBN 1258767759.
- Jarrow, Gail. New Deal Lawyer, Supreme Court Justice, Nuremberg Prosecutor. Honesdale, PA: Calkins Creek, 2008. ISBN 1590785118.
- Massa, Stephen J. Justice Jackson and the Perpetrators: Robert H. Jackson, the Third Reich, WWII, Nuremberg, the Defendants. Eagles Publishing, 2012. ISBN 0986012629
- Martin, Fenton S. and Goehlert, Robert U., The U.S. Supreme Court: A Bibliography. Congressional Quarterly Books, 1990. ISBN 0-87187-554-3.
- Nielsen, James. Robert H. Jackson: The Middle Ground. 6 La. L. Rev. / The University of Louisiana, 1945.
- O'Brien, David M. Justice Robert H. Jackson's Unpublished Opinion in Brown v. Board: Conflict, Compromise, and Constitutional Interpretation. Lawrence, KS: University Press of Kansas, 2017. ISBN 0700625186.
- Shubert, Glendon. Dispassionate Justice: A Synthesis of the Judicial Opinions of Robert H. Jackson. Indianapolis, IN: Bobbs-Merrill Company, 1969. ISBN 1299346685.
- Tusa, Ann and Tusa, John, The Nuremberg Trial. London: Macmillan, 1983. ISBN 0-333-27463-6.
- United States of America. Nomination of Robert H. Jackson to be an Associate Justice of the Supreme Court. Hearings, Seventy-Seventh Congress, First Session. 1941.
- Urofsky, Melvin I., The Supreme Court Justices: A Biographical Dictionary. New York: Garland Publishing, 1994. 590 pp. ISBN 0-8153-1176-1; ISBN 978-0-8153-1176-8.
- White, G. Edward. Robert H. Jackson: A Life in Judgment. Oxford University Press, 2025. ISBN 978-0197778432
- Olivier Beauvallet and Yves Ternon, Robert H. Jackson : Faire campagne pour la justice. Michalon, 2025. ISBN 978-2-347-00398-2

Legal offices
Preceded by Stanley Reed	United States Solicitor General; 1938–1940	Succeeded by Francis Biddle
Preceded by Frank Murphy	United States Attorney General; 1940–1941	Succeeded by Francis Biddle
Preceded by Harlan Stone	Associate Justice of the Supreme Court of the United States; 1941–1954	Succeeded by John Harlan II
