= Hively v. Ivy Tech Community College =

U.S. court case

- Court: United States Court of Appeals for the Seventh Circuit
- Full case name: Kimberly Hively, Plaintiff-Appellant, v. Ivy Tech Community College, Defendant-Appellee
- Argued: November 30 2016
- Decided: April 4 2017
- Citation: 853 F.3d 339

Case history
- Prior history: Motion to dismiss granted, 2015 U.S. Dist. LEXIS 25813, 2015 WL 926015 (N.D. Ind. 2015), affirmed, 830 F.3d 698 (7th Cir. 2015), rehearing en banc granted, 2016 U.S. App. LEXIS 20302 (7th Cir. 2016)

Holding
- Discrimination on the basis of sexual orientation violates the Civil Rights Act of 1964.

Court membership
- Judges sitting: Wood, Chief Judge, and Bauer, Posner, Flaum, Easterbrook, Ripple, Kanne, Rovner, Williams, Sykes, and Hamilton, Circuit Judges

Case opinions
- Majority: Wood, joined by Posner, Flaum (Parts I & II only), Easterbrook, Ripple (Parts I & II only), Rovner, Williams, and Hamilton
- Concurrence: Posner
- Concurrence: Flaum, joined by Ripple
- Dissent: Sykes, joined by Bauer, Kanne

Laws applied
- Title VII of the Civil Rights Act of 1964

Kimberly Hively v. Ivy Tech Community College, 853 F.3d 339 (7th Cir. 2017), was a decision of the United States Court of Appeals for the Seventh Circuit in which the Court held that discrimination on the basis of sexual orientation violates Title VII of the Civil Rights Act of 1964. The ruling made the Seventh Circuit the first federal appeals court to find that sexual orientation is a protected class under the Civil Rights Act of 1964.

Educator Kimberly Hively sued Ivy Tech Community College for employment discrimination in the United States District Court for the Northern District of Indiana, alleging that Ivy Tech had unlawfully discriminated on the basis of her sexual orientation. The District Court dismissed the lawsuit, holding that Title VII does not prohibit discrimination on the basis of sexual orientation. A three-judge panel of the United States Court of Appeals for the Seventh Circuit affirmed the dismissal of the lawsuit, but the Seventh Circuit judges voted to rehear the case en banc, before all 11 judges of the Court of Appeals.

Writing for the 8–3 majority, Chief Judge Diane Wood held that Title VII of the Civil Rights Act of 1964 prohibits employers from discriminating on the basis of sexual orientation. Wood wrote that discrimination on the basis of sexual orientation constitutes discrimination on the basis of sex, because if an employer discriminates on the basis of sex, a man in a relationship with a woman would not be discriminated against, but a woman in a relationship with a woman would be. Additionally, relying on the Supreme Court's decision in Loving v. Virginia, Wood wrote that discrimination on the basis of a person's partner's sex is tantamount to discrimination on the basis of sex.

After the Seventh Circuit's ruling, the Supreme Court in 2020 came to the same conclusion in Bostock v. Clayton County, holding that discrimination on the basis of sexual orientation violates Title VII of the Civil Rights Act of 1964.

== Background ==
=== District Court ===
Kimberly Hively, an openly lesbian educator, taught at Ivy Tech Community College as a part-time adjunct professor starting in 2000. In 2009, Hively asserted she was reprimanded for a kiss goodbye with her girlfriend in the parking lot of the school. After receiving a graduate degree in 2011, Hively applied for multiple full-time positions at Ivy Tech. Despite other educators who were hired after Hively having been given full-time positions, Hively was not. Further, her part-time contract was not renewed in 2014.

Facing difficulty finding lawyers to take her case in Indiana, she filed an employment discrimination lawsuit against Ivy Tech without a lawyer (pro se) in the United States District Court for the Northern District of Indiana under Title VII of the Civil Rights Act of 1964. The District Court dismissed the case in March 2015 on the basis that discrimination on the basis of sexual orientation does not violate Title VII.

=== Seventh Circuit panel ===
After securing legal representation by Lambda Legal, an LGBT civil rights legal group, Hively appealed to the United States Court of Appeals for the Seventh Circuit. A panel of three 7th Circuit judges affirmed the dismissal of the case in July 2016. In its ruling, the panel noted that it had so ruled only because it was bound by prior precedent from 2000, and urged the full Seventh Circuit to reconsider them. (Note: The cases establishing the precedent included Hamner v. St. Vincent Hosp. & Health Care Ctr., Inc., 224 F.3d 701, 704 (7th Cir. 2000), and Spearman v. Ford Motor Co., 231 F.3d 1080, 1085 (7th Cir. 2000).)

== En banc proceedings ==
Following the panel ruling, Hively petitioned the Seventh Circuit to rehear the case en banc (before all 11 judges of the Court). In October 2016, the full Court voted to rehear the case and vacate the older ruling. The en banc Court heard arguments in the case in November 2016.

=== Majority opinion ===
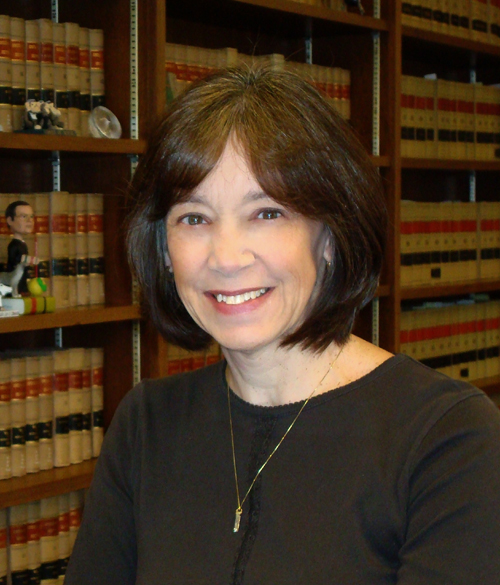
Chief Judge Diane Wood delivered the opinion of the 8–3 majority.

Chief Judge Diane Wood delivered the opinion of the Court in April 2017. By an 8–3 vote, the Seventh Circuit reversed the district court's dismissal and held that discrimination on the basis of sexual orientation violates the Civil Rights Act of 1964. Writing for the Court, Wood held that discrimination on the basis of sexual orientation constitutes sex discrimination for two reasons.

First, Wood analyzed Hively's claims by asking if she would have faced discrimination if she was male – that is, whether a man in a relationship with a woman would have been discriminated against, assuming that Ivy Tech discriminated on the basis of sexual orientation. Wood concluded that because a man in Hively's position would not have faced discrimination, any discrimination Hively faced would constitute "paradigmatic sex discrimination." In addition, relying on the Supreme Court's holding that discrimination for failure to conform to gender stereotypes constitutes sex discrimination, Wood wrote that homosexuality constitutes the "ultimate case of failure to conform to the female stereotype" and is thus protected by Title VII.

Second, Wood held that discrimination basis of an employee's intimate partner constitutes "associational discrimination." In Loving v. Virginia, the Supreme Court ruled that discrimination on the basis of a person's partner's race amounts to discrimination on the basis of race. Relying on the same reasoning, Wood held that discrimination on the basis of a person's partner's sex amounts to discrimination on the basis of sex.

Accordingly, the Court reversed the dismissal of the lawsuit and remanded the case back to the District Court for further action. The Court did not find that Ivy Tech had discriminated on the basis of sexual orientation – rather, the Court determined that the case should not have been dismissed.

=== Concurrences ===
Judge Flaum wrote a concurrence, which was joined by Judge Ripple. Flaum wrote that the text of the Civil Rights Act of 1964 justifies the majority's opinion. Flaum specifically noted that sex need only be a "motivating factor" in order for an action to constitute unlawful sex discrimination, and sex is naturally an element of an employer who discriminates on the basis of sexual orientation.

Judge Posner also wrote a concurrence, in which he agreed that sex discrimination should be prohibited by Title VII of the Civil Rights Act of 1964. However, taking a different approach than other judges in the majority, Posner wrote that judges should modify the interpretation of statutes based on their experiences. Noting the long time between the enactment of the Civil Rights Act of 1964 and the case before him, Posner wrote that interpreting sexual orientation to be protected by Title VII is necessary to "satisfy modern needs and understandings."

=== Dissent ===
Judge Sykes wrote a dissent, in which Judges Bauer and Kanne joined. Sykes found fault with the majority's approach to statutory interpretation, writing that in 1964, when the Civil Rights Act was enacted, "sex" did not include sexual orientation. Sykes wrote that Congress has specifically prohibited discrimination on the basis of "sexual orientation" in addition to "sex", suggesting that Congress views the terms as covering distinct meanings. Sykes wrote that bias on the basis of sexual orientation is entirely distinct from bias on the basis of sex, and argued that any attempt to prohibit sexual orientation discrimination should come from Congress, not the judiciary.

== Aftermath ==
Following the Seventh Circuit's ruling, Ivy Tech released a statement saying it "respects and appreciates" the Court's ruling and would not seek Supreme Court review of the ruling. Ivy Tech denied that it had engaged in any discrimination, and indicated that it would defend Hively's claims in the District Court. The parties reached a settlement in 2018.

== Legal developments ==
The Court's decision in Hively made the Seventh Circuit the highest federal court to find sexual orientation discrimination unlawful. The New York Times called the ruling a "significant victory for gay rights" and noted that five of the eight judges in the majority were appointed by Republican presidents. The ruling resulted in a circuit split, which made it more likely that the Supreme Court would grant a petition for a writ of certiorari (i.e., to agree to review a case presenting a similar issue), although the defendant in Hively did not file a petition for certiorari.

In Evans v. Georgia Regional Hospital, the U.S. Court of Appeals for the Eleventh Circuit, faced with an identical issue, came to the opposite ruling, holding in 2017 that Title VII's prohibition on employment discrimination "because of ... sex" does not apply to discrimination based on sexual orientation. The Supreme Court denied a cert petition in that case.

In Bostock v. Clayton County, the Supreme Court in 2020 held that discrimination on the basis of sexual orientation or gender identity violates Title VII of the Civil Rights Act.
