= Candace Jackson-Akiwumi =

American judge (born 1979)

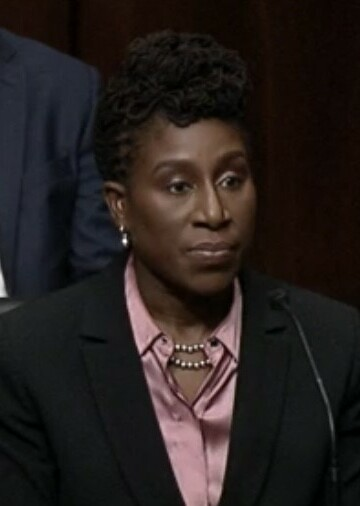

Judge of the United States Court of Appeals for the Seventh Circuit
- Incumbent
- Assumed office July 1, 2021
- Appointed by: Joe Biden
- Preceded by: Joel Flaum

Personal details
- Born: Candace Rae Jackson; 1979 (age 46–47) Norfolk, Virginia, U.S.
- Parent: Raymond Alvin Jackson (father)
- Education: Princeton University (BA); Yale University (JD)

Candace Rae Jackson-Akiwumi (born 1979) is an American jurist and attorney who has served as a United States circuit judge of the United States Court of Appeals for the Seventh Circuit since July 2021. She was previously a staff attorney at the federal defender program in the Northern District of Illinois from 2010 to 2020 and a partner at Zuckerman Spaeder in Washington, D.C., from 2020 to 2021.

== Early life and education ==
Jackson-Akiwumi was born in Norfolk, Virginia, to United States District Judge Raymond Alvin Jackson and former Norfolk General District Court Judge Gwendolyn Jackson. Jackson-Akiwumi received her Bachelor of Arts, with honors, from Princeton University in 2000 and her Juris Doctor from Yale Law School in 2005. At Yale, she served as a senior editor on the Yale Law Journal.

== Career ==
She began her legal career as a law clerk to Judge David H. Coar of the United States District Court for the Northern District of Illinois from 2005 to 2006, and then for Judge Roger Gregory of the United States Court of Appeals for the Fourth Circuit from 2006 to 2007. She was a litigation associate at Skadden, Arps, Slate, Meagher & Flom in Chicago from 2007 to 2010.

From 2010 to 2020, she worked as a staff attorney at the federal public defender program in the Northern District of Illinois. In 2018, she also co-taught a class in criminal law at Northwestern University Pritzker School of Law. From 2020 to 2021, she was a partner at Zuckerman Spaeder in Washington, D.C., where she focused on complex civil litigation, white collar criminal defense, and investigations.

=== Federal judicial service ===
On March 30, 2021, President Joe Biden announced his intent to nominate Jackson-Akiwumi to serve as a United States circuit judge for the United States Court of Appeals for the Seventh Circuit. On April 19, 2021, her nomination was sent to the Senate. President Biden nominated Jackson-Akiwumi to the seat vacated by Judge Joel Flaum, who assumed senior status on November 30, 2020. On April 28, 2021, a hearing on her nomination was held before the Senate Judiciary Committee. On May 20, 2021, her nomination was favorably reported by the committee by a 12–10 vote. On June 21, 2021, Majority Leader Chuck Schumer filed cloture on her nomination. On June 23, 2021, the United States Senate invoked cloture on her nomination by a 53–47 vote. On June 24, 2021, her nomination was confirmed by a 53–40 vote. She received her judicial commission on July 1, 2021. She is the second African-American woman (after Ann Claire Williams) and the first former federal public defender to sit on the Seventh Circuit.

=== U.S. Supreme Court speculation ===
In January 2022, Supreme Court Associate Justice Stephen Breyer announced that he would retire at the end of the term. Jackson-Akiwumi was included in lists of potential nominees for a Supreme Court appointment under President Joe Biden, who pledged to nominate the first Black woman to the Supreme Court if given the opportunity. Ultimately, Biden nominated Ketanji Brown Jackson, who was confirmed in April of that year.

== See also ==
- Joe Biden Supreme Court candidates
- List of African American federal judges
- List of African American jurists

Legal offices
Preceded by Joel Flaum	Judge of the United States Court of Appeals for the Seventh Circuit; 2021–present	Incumbent
