= Hively =

Hively is a surname. Notable persons with this name include:

- George Hively (1889–1950), American film writer and editor
- Jack Hively (1910–1995), American film editor and film and television director

== See also ==
- Hively v. Ivy Tech Community College of Indiana, a 2017 decision of the United States Court of Appeals for the Seventh Circuit holding that employment discrimination on the basis of sexual orientation violates Title VII of the Civil Rights Act
