= Spring Creek Township, Pennsylvania =

Spring Creek Township is the name of some places in the U.S. state of Pennsylvania:

- Spring Creek Township, Elk County, Pennsylvania
- Spring Creek Township, Warren County, Pennsylvania
