= Sufit =

Sufit is a surname. Notable people with the surname include:

- Alisha Sufit (born 1946), English singer-songwriter
- Robert L. Sufit, American neurologist
