= Morrisville, Virginia =

Unincorporated community in Virginia, United States

- Unincorporated community
- Location within Northern Virginia Location within Virginia Location within the United States
- Coordinates: 38°30′06″N 77°42′00″W
- Country: United States
- State: Virginia
- County: Fauquier
- Time zone: UTC−5 (Eastern (EST))
  - Summer (DST): UTC−4 (EDT)

Morrisville is an unincorporated community in southern Fauquier County, Virginia, United States, located on U.S. Route 17, and the southern terminus of State Route 806, at an elevation of 436 feet (133 m).

== Notable person ==
- Richard Leroy Williams, United States District Court judge
