= Robert Arthur Sprecher =

American judge (1917–1982)

Judge of the United States Court of Appeals for the Seventh Circuit
- In office April 23, 1971 – May 15, 1982
- Appointed by: Richard Nixon
- Preceded by: Latham Castle
- Succeeded by: Joel Flaum

Personal details
- Born: Robert Arthur Sprecher; May 30, 1917 Chicago, Illinois, U.S.
- Died: May 15, 1982 (aged 64)
- Education: Central YMCA College (AA); Northwestern University (BS, JD)

Robert Arthur Sprecher (May 30, 1917 – May 15, 1982) was a United States circuit judge of the United States Court of Appeals for the Seventh Circuit.

== Education and career ==
Born in Chicago, Illinois, Sprecher received an Associate of Arts degree from Central YMCA College in 1936, a Bachelor of Science degree from Northwestern University in 1938, and a Juris Doctor from Northwestern University School of Law in 1941. He was in private practice in Chicago from 1941 to 1971. He was a bar examiner for the State of Illinois from 1949 to 1971. He was a special assistant to the attorney general of Illinois from 1957 to 1963.

== Federal judicial service ==
On March 29, 1971, Sprecher was nominated by President Richard Nixon to a seat on the United States Court of Appeals for the Seventh Circuit vacated by Judge Latham Castle. Sprecher was confirmed by the United States Senate on April 21, 1971, and received his commission on April 23, 1971. Sprecher served in that capacity until his death on May 15, 1982.

== Sources ==
Legal offices
Preceded by Latham Castle	Judge of the United States Court of Appeals for the Seventh Circuit; 1971–1982	Succeeded by Joel Flaum
