= Raymond Alvin Jackson =

American judge (born 1949)

Raymond Jackson

Senior Judge of the United States District Court for the Eastern District of Virginia
- Incumbent
- Assumed office November 23, 2021

Judge of the United States District Court for the Eastern District of Virginia
- In office November 22, 1993 – November 23, 2021
- Appointed by: Bill Clinton
- Preceded by: Richard Leroy Williams
- Succeeded by: Jamar K. Walker

Personal details
- Born: Raymond Alvin Jackson; August 3, 1949 (age 75); Sussex, Virginia, U.S.
- Spouse: Gwendolyn Jackson
- Children: Candace
- Education: Norfolk State University (BA); University of Virginia (JD)

Raymond Alvin Jackson (born August 3, 1949) is a senior United States district judge of the United States District Court for the Eastern District of Virginia.

== Education and career ==
Born in Sussex, Virginia, Jackson received a Bachelor of Arts degree from Norfolk State University in 1970 and a Juris Doctor from the University of Virginia School of Law in 1973. He was in the United States Army, JAG Corps, from 1973 to 1977, attaining the rank of captain. He thereafter remained in the United States Army Reserve, achieving the rank of colonel. He was an Assistant United States Attorney of the Eastern District of Virginia from 1977 to 1993, and was an adjunct lecturer at the College of William and Mary, Marshall-Wythe School of Law, from 1981 to 1991 and in 1993.

=== Federal judicial service ===
On September 24, 1993, Jackson was nominated by President Bill Clinton to a seat on the United States District Court for the Eastern District of Virginia vacated by Richard Leroy Williams. Jackson was confirmed by the United States Senate on November 20, 1993, and received his commission on November 22, 1993. He assumed senior status on November 23, 2021.

== Personal life ==
Jackson is married to retired judge Gwendolyn Jackson from the 4th Judicial District of Virginia. Their daughter Candace Jackson-Akiwumi is a judge of the United States Court of Appeals for the Seventh Circuit.

== See also ==
- List of African-American federal judges
- List of African-American jurists

Legal offices
Preceded by Richard Leroy Williams	Judge of the United States District Court for the Eastern District of Virginia; 1993–2021	Succeeded by Jamar K. Walker
