= Joel Flaum =

American judge (1936–2024)

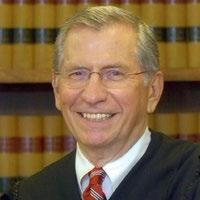
- Flaum in 2019

Senior Judge of the United States Court of Appeals for the Seventh Circuit
- In office November 30, 2020 – December 4, 2024

Chief Judge of the United States Court of Appeals for the Seventh Circuit
- In office August 1, 2000 – November 27, 2006
- Preceded by: Richard Posner
- Succeeded by: Frank Easterbrook

Judge of the United States Court of Appeals for the Seventh Circuit
- In office May 5, 1983 – November 30, 2020
- Appointed by: Ronald Reagan
- Preceded by: Robert Arthur Sprecher
- Succeeded by: Candace Jackson-Akiwumi

Judge of the United States District Court for the Northern District of Illinois
- In office December 20, 1974 – June 1, 1983
- Appointed by: Gerald Ford
- Preceded by: Philip Willis Tone
- Succeeded by: Ilana Rovner

Personal details
- Born: Joel Martin Flaum; November 26, 1936 Hudson, New York, U.S.
- Died: December 4, 2024 (aged 88) Elkhorn, Wisconsin, U.S.
- Children: 2
- Education: Union College (BA); Northwestern University School of Law (JD, LLM)

Joel Martin Flaum (November 26, 1936 – December 4, 2024) was a United States circuit judge of the United States Court of Appeals for the Seventh Circuit and a United States District Judge of the United States District Court for the Northern District of Illinois.

== Education ==
Born in Hudson, New York, Flaum received a Bachelor of Arts degree from Union College in 1958, a Juris Doctor from Northwestern University School of Law in 1963, and a Master of Laws from the same institution in 1964. He was a United States Naval Reserve Lieutenant Commander, JAG Corps from 1981 to 1992.

== Career ==
Flaum was in private practice in Chicago, Illinois, from 1964 to 1965. He then transitioned into public service as an Assistant State's Attorney of Cook County, Illinois, from 1965 to 1969. He served as a Lecturer, Northwestern University School of Law from 1967 to 1969, and he helped found the Police Legal Advisory Program at Northwestern. Flaum was an Assistant Attorney General of Illinois from 1969 to 1970, and he became First Assistant Attorney General of Illinois from 1970 to 1972. He was First Assistant United States Attorney for the Northern District of Illinois from 1972 to 1975.

== Federal judicial service ==
On November 18, 1974, at the age of 38, Flaum was nominated by President Gerald Ford to a seat on the United States District Court for the Northern District of Illinois vacated by Judge Philip Willis Tone. Flaum was confirmed by the United States Senate on December 18, 1974, and received his commission on December 20, 1974. Flaum's service terminated on June 1, 1983, due to elevation to the Seventh Circuit Court.

Flaum was then nominated by President Ronald Reagan on April 14, 1983, to a seat on the United States Court of Appeals for the Seventh Circuit vacated by Judge Robert Arthur Sprecher. Flaum was confirmed by the Senate on May 4, 1983, and received his commission on May 5, 1983. He served as Chief Judge from 2000 to 2006. Flaum assumed senior status on November 30, 2020.

=== Notable opinions ===
In March 2017, Flaum found that police officers could not be sued for needlessly destroying property during a search because they had prevented the owner from witnessing which officers had caused the damage. Judge David Hamilton partially dissented, arguing that the owner should not have been required to instead plead a novel "conspiracy of silence" claim.

On April 4, 2017, Flaum wrote a concurrence when the 7th Circuit upheld (in an 8–3 vote) that employment discrimination based on sexual orientation violates Title VII of the Civil Rights Act.

Flaum wrote: "Consequently, employment discrimination based on an employee’s interracial relationship is, in part, tied to an enumerated trait: the employee’s race. This type of discrimination is prohibited by Title VII. The same principle applies here. Ivy Tech allegedly refused to promote Professor Hively because she was homosexual—or (A) a woman who is (B) sexually attracted to women. Thus, the College allegedly discriminated against Professor Hively, at least in part, because of her sex. I conclude that Title VII, as its text provides, does not allow this."

Flaum was joined by Kenneth Francis Ripple in his concurrence, and the two of them joined part of the majority opinion written by Diane Wood.

On April 19, 2018, Flaum was the deciding vote in blocking Indiana's fetal burial requirement. Flaum was also in the 3–0 majority to block Indiana's ban on abortions due to race, sex, or disability. The majority opinion was written by William J. Bauer, and the 2–1 and 3–0 discrepancy comes from the partial dissent of Daniel Anthony Manion.

On June 25, 2018, Flaum again cast the decisive vote in favor of abortion rights, to deny rehearing of the April 2018 cases. The U.S. Supreme Court partially overturned and partially declined to review the opinion in Box v. Planned Parenthood of Indiana and Kentucky, Inc.

Despite his 2018 votes in favor of abortion rights, on November 1, 2019, Flaum voted to rehear a case after a three-judge panel blocked Indiana's parental notification requirements. Flaum joined a dissent written by Michael Stephen Kanne.

On September 7, 2018, Flaum ruled that the felon dispossession statutes that barred felons from getting rifles does not violate the Second Amendment. Flaum was joined by Kenneth Francis Ripple over the dissent of Amy Coney Barrett.

In June 2020, Flaum, joined by Judge Amy St. Eve and then-Judge Amy Coney Barrett, held that during resentencing under the First Step Act, a previous sentence over double the United States Federal Sentencing Guidelines range could not simply be reimposed without explanation.

== Personal life and death ==
Flaum was married to Delilah Flaum and previously had been married to television producer Thea Flaum. He died in Elkhorn, Wisconsin on December 4, 2024, at the age of 88.

== Awards ==
Flaum was inducted as a Laureate of The Lincoln Academy of Illinois and awarded the Order of Lincoln (the State's highest honor) by the Governor of Illinois in 2008 in the area of government and law.

== See also ==
- List of Jewish American jurists
- List of United States federal judges by longevity of service

== Sources ==
Legal offices
Preceded by Philip Willis Tone	Judge of the United States District Court for the Northern District of Illinois; 1974–1983	Succeeded by Ilana Rovner
Preceded by Robert Arthur Sprecher	Judge of the United States Court of Appeals for the Seventh Circuit; 1983–2020	Succeeded by Candace Jackson-Akiwumi
Preceded by Richard Posner	Chief Judge of the United States Court of Appeals for the Seventh Circuit; 2000–2006	Succeeded by Frank Easterbrook
