= John Z. Lee =

American judge (born 1968)

John Lee
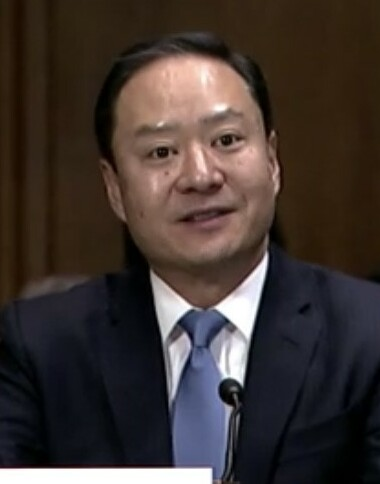

Judge of the United States Court of Appeals for the Seventh Circuit
- Incumbent
- Assumed office September 9, 2022
- Appointed by: Joe Biden
- Preceded by: Diane Wood

Judge of the United States District Court for the Northern District of Illinois
- In office May 8, 2012 – September 12, 2022
- Appointed by: Barack Obama
- Preceded by: David H. Coar
- Succeeded by: Lindsay C. Jenkins

Personal details
- Born: John Zihun Lee; March 30, 1968 (age 58) Aachen, West Germany (now Germany)
- Education: Harvard University (BA, JD)

John Zihun Lee (born March 30, 1968) is an American lawyer serving as a United States circuit judge of the United States Court of Appeals for the Seventh Circuit. He served as a United States district judge of the United States District Court for the Northern District of Illinois from 2012 to 2022.

== Biography ==
Lee was born in Aachen, Germany. He graduated from Harvard College in 1989 with a Bachelor of Arts, magna cum laude, and from Harvard Law School in 1992 with a Juris Doctor, cum laude.

He first worked as a trial attorney in the United States Department of Justice Environment and Natural Resources Division. He worked as an associate at Mayer Brown, a white shoe Chicago law firm, from 1994 to 1996 and the boutique law firm of Grippo & Elden LLC from 1996 to 1999. He was a partner at Freeborn & Peters LLP in Chicago, where he handled complex federal civil litigation. In the fall of 2000, he was an adjunct professor at The John Marshall Law School teaching a course on antitrust law. In the fall terms of 1990 and 1991, while a teaching fellow at Harvard University, he taught a class on Greek mythology.

== Federal judicial service ==
=== District court service ===
On November 10, 2011, President Barack Obama nominated Lee to be a United States district judge for the United States District Court for the Northern District of Illinois. He was nominated to the seat vacated by Judge David H. Coar, who assumed senior status on August 12, 2009. Lee received his hearing by the Senate Judiciary Committee on January 26, 2012, and his nomination was favorably reported by the committee on February 16, 2012, by a voice vote, with Senator Mike Lee recording the only no vote. On May 7, 2012, his nomination was confirmed by a voice vote. He received his commission on May 8, 2012. His service as a district judge was terminated on September 12, 2022, when he was elevated to the court of appeals.

=== Notable rulings ===
In July 2018, Lee, sitting by designation, wrote for the unanimous panel of the United States Court of Appeals for the Seventh Circuit in Doe No. 55 v. Madison Metropolitan School District when it found that the Madison Metropolitan School District was not liable for child sex abuse of a student by its security guard because the school's principal had not had actual knowledge of the abuse. This decision was affirmed en banc.

On May 3, 2020, Lee ruled that Governor J. B. Pritzker's stay-at-home order during the COVID-19 pandemic in Illinois was constitutional, after an Evangelical church sought an injunction against the order in order to continue worship services.

In 2026, Lee upheld a lower court's decision that ruled the possession of AI-generated child sex abuse material (CSAM) was protected by the First Amendment. He cited a previous Supreme Court ruling, which found that CSAM that did not portray a real person was not considered child pornography; he recommended the Supreme Court revisit the issue in the face of technological advances.

=== Court of appeals service ===
On April 13, 2022, President Joe Biden announced his intent to nominate Lee to serve as a United States circuit judge for the United States Court of Appeals for the Seventh Circuit. On April 25, 2022, his nomination was sent to the Senate. President Biden nominated Lee to the seat to be vacated by Judge Diane Wood, who announced her intent to assume senior status upon confirmation of a successor. On May 11, 2022, a hearing on his nomination was held before the Senate Judiciary Committee. During his confirmation hearing, Republican senators criticized him over his decision to uphold J. B. Pritzker's stay-at-home order, which limited in-person church services. On June 9, 2022, his nomination was favorably reported by the committee by a 12–8–2 vote. On August 7, 2022, Majority Leader Chuck Schumer filed cloture on his nomination. On September 6, 2022, the United States Senate invoked cloture on his nomination by a 48–42 vote. On September 7, 2022, his nomination was confirmed by a 50–44 vote. He received his judicial commission on September 9, 2022. He is the first Asian American judge to ever serve on the 7th Circuit.

== See also ==
- List of Asian American jurists
- List of first minority male lawyers and judges in Illinois

Legal offices
| Preceded by David H. Coar | Judge of the United States District Court for the Northern District of Illinois; 2012–2022 | Succeeded by Lindsay C. Jenkins |
| Preceded by Diane Wood | Judge of the United States Court of Appeals for the Seventh Circuit; 2022–present | Incumbent |
