= Jamar K. Walker =

American judge (born 1986)

Jamar Walker
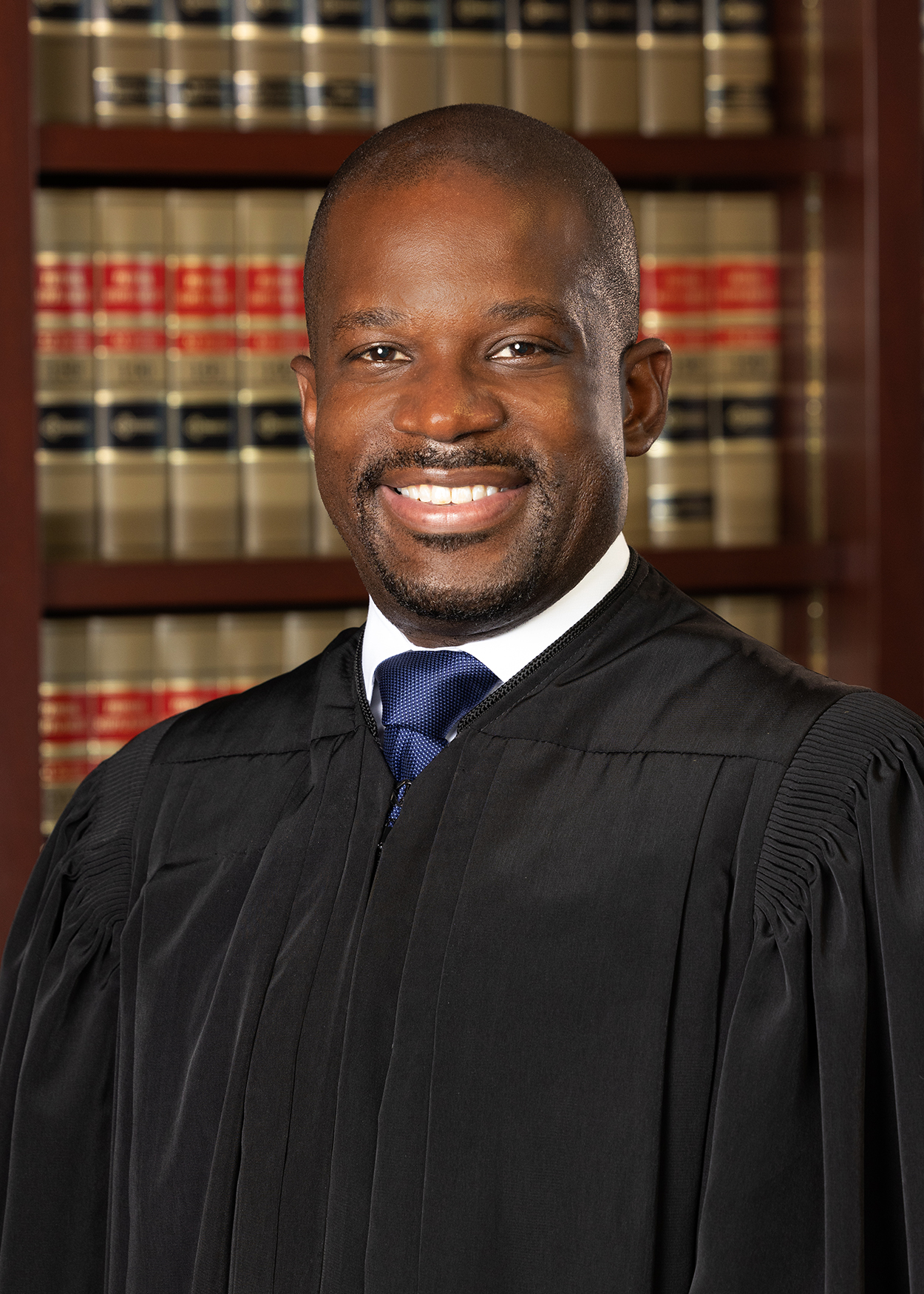

Judge of the United States District Court for the Eastern District of Virginia
- Incumbent
- Assumed office March 3, 2023
- Appointed by: Joe Biden
- Preceded by: Raymond Jackson

Personal details
- Born: Jamar Kentrell Walker; 1986 (age 39–40) Nassawadox, Virginia, U.S.
- Education: University of Virginia (BA, JD)

Jamar Kentrell Walker (born 1986) is an American lawyer serving as a United States district judge of the United States District Court for the Eastern District of Virginia. He previously served as an assistant United States attorney for the United States Attorney's Office for the Eastern District of Virginia.

== Early life and education ==
Walker was born and raised on the Eastern Shore of Virginia. He attended Nandua High School and served as class president. He earned a Bachelor of Arts degree from the University of Virginia in 2008 and a Juris Doctor from the University of Virginia School of Law in 2011.

== Career ==
From 2011 and 2012, Walker served as a law clerk for Judge Raymond Alvin Jackson of the United States District Court for the Eastern District of Virginia. From 2012 to 2015, he worked as an associate at Covington & Burling in Washington, D.C. He served as an assistant United States attorney in the United States Attorney's Office for the Eastern District of Virginia from 2015 to 2023, where he focused on white-collar crime.

=== Federal judicial service ===
In March 2022, Walker was one of two candidates recommended to the president by U.S. Senators Mark Warner and Tim Kaine. On July 13, 2022, President Joe Biden nominated Walker to serve as a United States district judge of the United States District Court for the Eastern District of Virginia. President Biden nominated Walker to the seat vacated by Judge Raymond Alvin Jackson, who assumed senior status on November 23, 2021. On September 21, 2022, a hearing on his nomination was held before the Senate Judiciary Committee. On December 1, 2022, his nomination was reported out of committee by a 15–7 vote. On January 3, 2023, his nomination was returned to the President under Rule XXXI, Paragraph 6 of the United States Senate; he was renominated later the same day. On February 2, 2023, his nomination was reported out of committee by a 14–6 vote. On February 27, 2023, the Senate invoked cloture on his nomination by a 52–39 vote. On February 28, 2023, his nomination was confirmed by a 52–41 vote. He received his judicial commission on March 3, 2023. He was sworn in on March 6, 2023. Walker is the first openly LGBTQ Article III judge to serve in Virginia.

== See also ==
- List of African-American federal judges
- List of African-American jurists
- List of LGBT jurists in the United States

Legal offices
Preceded by Raymond Jackson	Judge of the United States District Court for the Eastern District of Virginia; 2023–present	Incumbent
