= The Supreme Court Review =

- Discipline: Law
- Language: English
- Edited by: Dennis J. Hutchinson, David A. Strauss, Geoffrey R. Stone

Publication details
- History: 1960-present
- Publisher: University of Chicago Press for the University of Chicago Law School (United States)
- Frequency: Annual
- Impact factor: 1.188 (2017)

Standard abbreviations
- Bluebook: Sup. Ct. Rev.
- ISO 4: Supreme Court Rev.

Indexing
- ISSN: 0081-9557 (print); 2158-2459 (web)
- LCCN: sf84019067
- JSTOR: 00819557
- OCLC no.: 1039464547

Links
- Journal homepage; Journal page at the University of Chicago Press; Online access; Online archive

The Supreme Court Review is an annual peer-reviewed law journal covering the legal implications of decisions by the Supreme Court of the United States. It is published by the University of Chicago Press and was established in 1960. The journal's founding editor Philip B. Kurland held the position until 1988. The editors-in-chief are Dennis J. Hutchinson, David A. Strauss, and Geoffrey R. Stone (University of Chicago Law School).

== Abstracting and indexing ==
The journal is abstracted and indexed in:

- EBSCO databases
- MEDLINE/PubMed (selected citations only)
- ProQuest databases
- Scopus
- Social Sciences Citation Index

According to the Journal Citation Reports, the journal has a 2016 impact factor of 1.188.
