= Diane Wood =

American judge (born 1950)

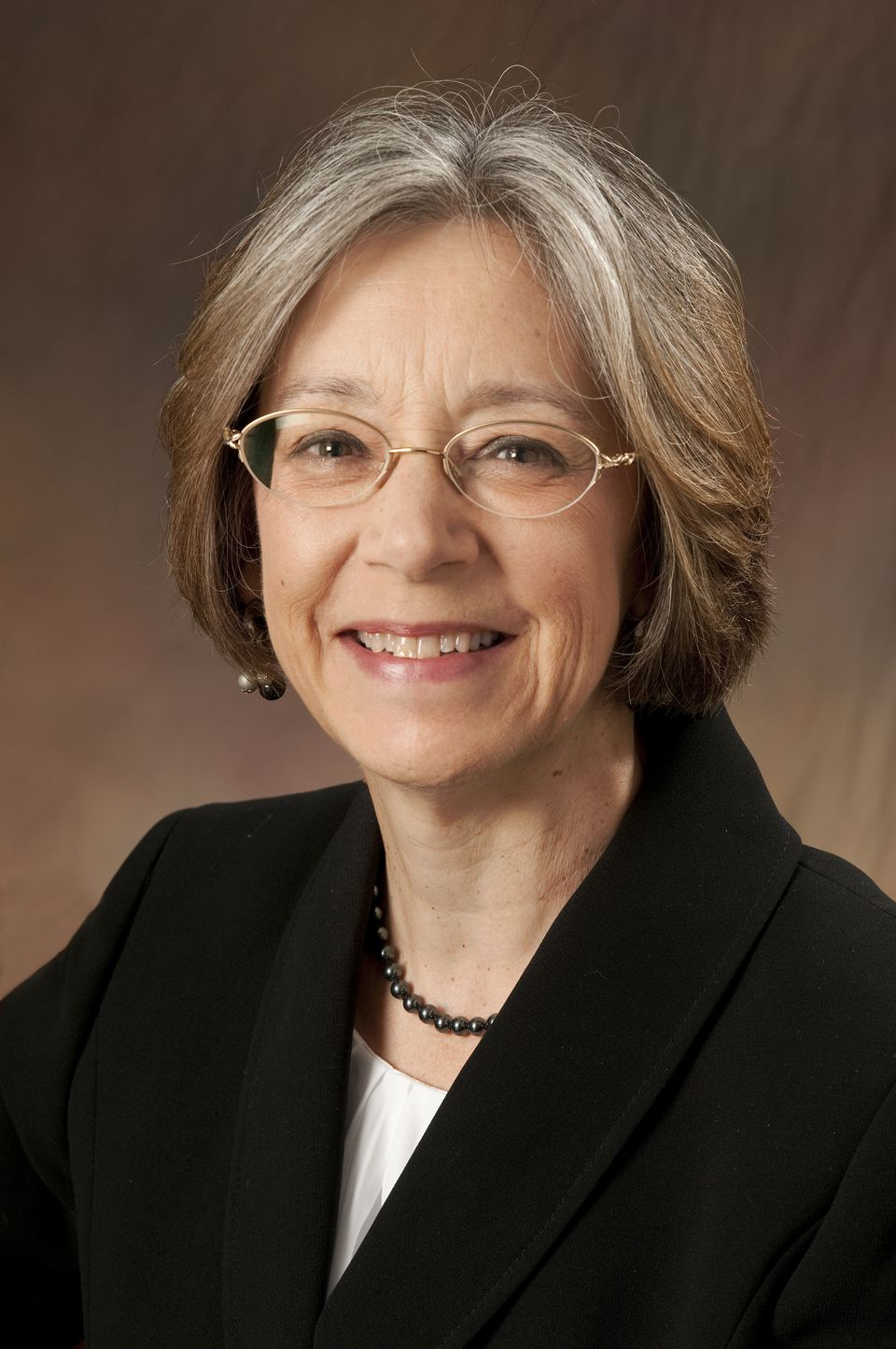

Senior Judge of the United States Court of Appeals for the Seventh Circuit
- In office September 7, 2022 – April 30, 2024

Chief Judge of the United States Court of Appeals for the Seventh Circuit
- In office October 1, 2013 – July 3, 2020
- Preceded by: Frank H. Easterbrook
- Succeeded by: Diane S. Sykes

Judge of the United States Court of Appeals for the Seventh Circuit
- In office June 30, 1995 – September 7, 2022
- Appointed by: Bill Clinton
- Preceded by: William J. Bauer
- Succeeded by: John Z. Lee

Personal details
- Born: Diane Pamela Wood; July 4, 1950 (age 76) Plainfield, New Jersey, U.S.
- Spouse(s): Steve Van (early 1970s) Dennis J. Hutchinson (m. 1978; div. 1998) Robert L. Sufit (m. 2006)
- Children: 6
- Education: University of Texas at Austin (BA, JD)
- Awards: Henry J. Friendly Medal (2026)

Diane Pamela Wood (born July 4, 1950) is an American attorney who serves as the director of the American Law Institute and a senior lecturer at the University of Chicago Law School. She previously served as a circuit judge on the United States Court of Appeals for the Seventh Circuit.

After working in private practice and the executive branch, Wood became the third woman ever hired as a law professor at the University of Chicago Law School. President Bill Clinton nominated her to the Seventh Circuit on March 31, 1995. As a judge, she was considered a liberal intellectual counter to Richard Posner and Frank H. Easterbrook. She was also a finalist to be nominated for the Supreme Court during the first two years of the Obama Administration.

== Early life and education ==
Diane Pamela Wood was born on July 4, 1950, in Plainfield, New Jersey, to Lucille Padmore Wood and Kenneth Reed Wood. She lived in nearby Westfield, New Jersey, where her father was an accountant at Exxon, and her mother worked for the Washington Rock Girl Scout Council. She is the second of three children, with an older sister and a younger brother. When Wood was 16, her family moved to Houston, Texas. In 1968, she graduated as valedictorian of Westchester High School in Houston.

Wood graduated from the University of Texas at Austin in 1972 with a bachelor's degree in English with high honors. She was then accepted to University of Texas School of Law. There, Wood was an editor of the Texas Law Review and a member of the Women's Legal Caucus. Wood earned her Juris Doctor from the University of Texas School of Law in 1975, graduating with high honors and Order of the Coif. She was among the first women at the University of Texas admitted as a member of the Friar Society.

== Career ==
Wood clerked for Judge Irving Loeb Goldberg of the United States Court of Appeals for the Fifth Circuit from 1975 to 1976 and for Justice Harry Blackmun of the United States Supreme Court from 1976 to 1977. She was one of the first women to serve as a law clerk for a Supreme Court justice. After clerking at the Supreme Court, Wood was an attorney-advisor for the Office of the Legal Adviser of the United States Department of State from 1977 to 1978. From 1978 to 1980, she practiced at the law firm Covington & Burling in Washington, D.C.

Wood began her teaching career as an assistant professor of law at Georgetown University from 1980 to 1981. In 1981, she settled in Chicago and joined the faculty of the University of Chicago Law School. She was the third woman ever hired as a law professor at the University of Chicago and the only woman on the faculty when she began in 1981. Wood served as Professor of Law from 1989 to 1992, Associate Dean from 1990 to 1995, and (as the first woman to be honored with a named chair) the Harold J. and Marion F. Green Professor of International Legal Studies from 1992 to 1995. Since her appointment to the Seventh Circuit, she has continued to teach at the University of Chicago Law School as a Senior Lecturer in Law, along with fellow Seventh Circuit judges Frank Easterbrook and Richard Posner.

Wood was a special assistant to the Assistant Attorney General at the United States Department of Justice from 1985 to 1987. From 1993 to 1995, she served as Deputy Assistant Attorney General for international, appellate, and policy in the Antitrust Division of the Department of Justice.

Wood is a member of the American Law Institute and sits on its Council. She is also a member of the American Society of International Law, and a Fellow of the American Academy of Arts and Sciences where she serves as Chair of the Council. A past member of the American Bar Association, she has served on the governing councils of the ABA's Section of Antitrust Law and its Section of International Law and Practice. Wood has pursued various law reform projects through the American Bar Association and the Brookings Institution Project on Civil Justice Reform. She was also instrumental in developing the University of Chicago's first policy on sexual harassment. While still a full-time law school professor (before joining the Department of Justice and the Court of Appeals), she was a member of Planned Parenthood and the National Organization for Women.

In January 2021, the University of Chicago Law School, where Wood teaches as a senior lecturer, announced that it would honor Wood for her 25th anniversary on the United States Court of Appeals for the Seventh Circuit with a special edition of essays published by her colleagues in the University of Chicago Law Review.

== Federal judicial service ==
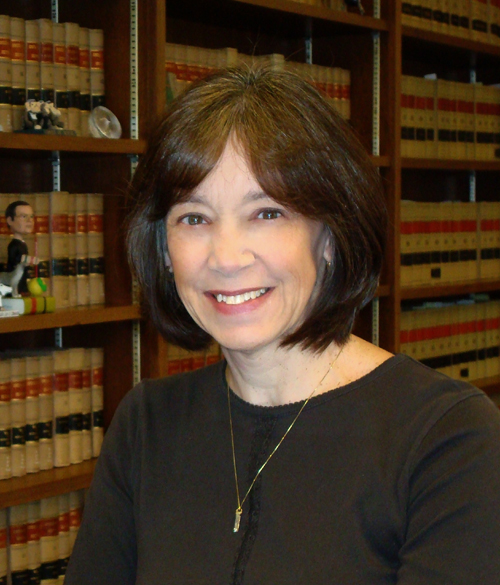
Prior official photograph from 2008

On March 31, 1995, President Bill Clinton nominated Wood to the United States Court of Appeals for the Seventh Circuit after William J. Bauer assumed senior status. She was confirmed unanimously by the Senate and received her commission on June 30, 1995. Wood became the second woman ever to sit on the Seventh Circuit. She is known for building consensus on the court and rallying other judges around her positions. Neil A. Lewis has called Wood an "unflinching and spirited intellectual counterweight" to the Seventh Circuit's well-known conservative heavyweights Richard Posner and Frank Easterbrook. She served as Chief Judge from October 1, 2013, to July 3, 2020. On December 9, 2021, Wood announced she would assume senior status upon confirmation of her successor. She assumed senior status on September 7, 2022. She retired from the bench on April 30, 2024.

Wood was considered to be nominated for the United States Supreme Court in the Obama administration. Speculation that she might be appointed intensified after Justice David Souter's retirement announcement, and Wood was the first candidate Obama interviewed for the post, meeting with her at the White House while she was visiting from Chicago. When Justice John Paul Stevens announced that he would retire at the end of October 2009 term, Wood's name was again widely put forward as a likely replacement.

== Noteworthy rulings ==
=== LGBTQ Rights ===
- Wetzel v. Glen St. Andrew Living Community, No. 17-1322 (7th Cir. Aug. 27, 2018): A gay woman living in a senior-living facility was repeatedly abused by other tenants because of her sexual orientation. She complained about the abuse several times to management, but management refused to help her in any way. Wood first ruled that the Fair Housing Act prohibits discrimination based on sexual orientation and then ruled that a landlord may be held liable under the same act if it has knowledge of sexual-orientation harassment but fails to take any action to remedy it.
- Hively v. Ivy Tech Community College of Indiana, Hively v. Ivy Tech Community College of Indiana No. 15-1720 (7th Cir. Apr. 4, 2017) (en banc): Wood wrote the majority opinion for the en banc court concluding that the prohibition on sex discrimination in Title VII of the Civil Rights Act of 1964 encompasses discrimination on the basis of sexual orientation. The plaintiff, Hively, alleged that Ivy Tech failed to promote her from an adjunct to a full-time professor because she was a lesbian. Wood's opinion reasoned that discrimination on the basis of sexual orientation is discrimination on the basis of sex, because, according to Hively's allegations, if she were a man in a relationship with a woman, she would have been promoted to full-time status, but because she was a woman in a relationship with a woman, she was not promoted. In so ruling, the Seventh Circuit became the first federal court of appeals to find that Title VII forbids discrimination on the basis of sexual orientation.

=== Separation of church and state ===
- St. Augustine School v. Evers, 906 F.3d 591 (7th Cir. 2018).: Wood wrote for the majority when it found that Tony Evers, then Superintendent of Public Instruction of Wisconsin, did not violate the Constitution's Free Exercise Clause nor its Establishment Clause when he denied bussing to an independent Catholic school because there was a nearby archdiocesan school, over the dissent of Judge Kenneth Francis Ripple.
- Christian Legal Society v. Walker, 453 F.3d 853 (7th Cir. 2006) (dissenting): Christian Legal Society appealed after an Illinois district court denied their motion to enjoin Southern Illinois University (SIU) School of Law to recognize a Christian student organization that required members to sign a statement of faith. The majority reversed, and Wood dissented, writing that the facts were insufficient to grant a preliminary injunction. Wood did not reach the merits of the case, her decision was purely procedural in nature. She wrote:

If, in the end, the facts show that [the university's] nondiscrimination policy does not apply to student organizations, or that SIU is discriminating against CLS based upon its evangelical Christian viewpoint, the district court should certainly enjoin SIU from enforcing its policy.

She cited Lawrence v. Texas to support the proposition that a state may ban discrimination based on either status or conduct. In April 2010, the Supreme Court heard arguments in Christian Legal Society v. Martinez, 08-1371 (Apr. 19, 2010). A Supreme Court blogger opined that Justice Kennedy was concerned, that the record might not have developed enough to move forward. Judge Wood stated in her dissenting opinion in Christian Legal Society v. Walker that the record was insufficient to grant injunctive relief.

=== Immigration ===
- Bayo v. Napolitano, 593 F.3d 495 (7th Cir. 2010) (en banc): Wood wrote for a unanimous en banc court, holding that an alien's waiver of constitutional due process rights must be done knowingly and voluntarily and that the government may rely upon any valid ground to remove an alien illegally in the United States.

=== Firearms ===
- Bevis v. City of Naperville, (7th Cir. Nov. 3, 2023): In consolidated cases challenging Illinois's ban on assault weapons, Wood wrote that assault weapons are not "arms" within the meaning of the Second Amendment: "We come to this conclusion because these assault weapons and high-capacity magazines are much more like machineguns and military-grade weaponry than they are like the many different types of firearms that are used for individual self-defense (or so the legislature was entitled to conclude)." Slip op. at 31. She also held that assault-weapons bans are consistent with the history and tradition of firearms regulation. See, generally, slip op. at 35-45. Wood was joined by Judge Easterbrook; Judge Michael B. Brennan dissented.

=== Fair Housing Act ===
- Bloch v. Frischholz, 533 F.3d 562 (7th Cir. 2008) (Wood, J., dissenting): An observant Jewish family affixed their mezuzah to the doorpost of their condominium. The condo association repeatedly removed the mezuzah, and the family sued, alleging violations of the Fair Housing Act. Wood argued there was sufficient evidence of intentional discrimination, but the majority of the panel disagreed. After the panel decision issued, the Seventh Circuit reheard the case en banc and unanimously reversed the panel majority. Wood's dissenting opinion, highly protective of the right to free exercise, became the unanimous opinion of the Seventh Circuit. Bloch v. Frischholz, 587 F.3d 771 (7th Cir. 2009). Two judges who initially opposed Wood's position joined the unanimous court.

=== First Amendment ===
- National Organization for Women v. Scheidler, 267 F.3d 687 (7th Cir. 2001) and 396 F.3d 807 (7th Cir. 2005); see also National Organization of Women v. Scheidler, 510 U.S. 249 (1994) (Supreme Court permits case to proceed under Racketeer Influenced and Corrupt Organizations Act (RICO)); 537 U.S. 393 (2003) (Supreme Court reverses 267 F.3d 687, construing extortion predicate to RICO violations); 547 U.S. 9 (2006) (Supreme Court holds that physical violence not covered under the Hobbs Act): Wood found that the district court did not err in concluding that RICO authorized private plaintiffs to seek an injunction. Wood recognized that:

Protection of politically controversial speech is at the core of the First Amendment, and no one disputes that the defendants' speech labeling abortion as murder, urging the clinics to get out of the abortion business, and urging clinics patients not to seek abortions is fully protected by the First Amendment.

However, Wood held that the injunction issued by the district court, which prohibited violent conduct by protesters, struck a proper balance and avoided any risk of curtailing activities protected by the First Amendment.

- Goldwasser v. Ameritech Corp., 222 F.3d 390 (7th Cir. 2000): Because the plaintiffs had alleged only that Ameritech violated the Telecommunications Act of 1996, Wood decided that they had not shown that the antitrust laws have been violated. The opinion defers to Congress's deregulation of the telecommunications market. Four years later, the position that Wood took in Goldwasser was approved by the Supreme Court in Verizon Communications v. Law Offices of Curtis V. Trinko LLP, 540 U.S. 398 (2004).

=== Abortion ===
On June 25, 2018, Wood wrote a concurrence in the denial of en banc after the Seventh Circuit blocked Indiana's fetal burial requirement and ban on disability-based abortion. Wood's concurrence was joined by Ilana Rovner and David Hamilton.

=== COVID-19 mandates ===
In early September 2020, Wood wrote the opinion in a ruling against the Illinois Republican Party's challenge against Governor J. B. Pritzker's COVID-19 orders.

=== Voting Rights ===
In League of Women Voters v. Sullivan (7th Cir. July 19, 2021), Wood wrote a unanimous ruling striking down an Indiana law allowing the state to purge voters without notifying the voter first. Wood was joined by Michael Brennan and Amy St. Eve, both of whom are Trump appointees.

== Law reform work ==
Wood was elected to the American Law Institute in 1990 and was elected to the ALI Council in 2003. She is Chair of the ALI's Nominating Committee and an Adviser on two projects: the Restatement Fourth, The Foreign Relations Law of the United States project (Jurisdiction) and the Restatement Third, The Law of American Indians. She used to be an Adviser on the Principles of the Law of Aggregate Litigation project and the Transnational Rules of Civil Procedure project.

== Writings ==
Wood has been called a "rock star of the written word" by Mother Jones. She has written extensively in many areas of the law, and a full bibliography can be found at the University of Chicago Law School website. Some representative works include:

- The Changing Face of Diversity Jurisdiction, 82 Temp. L. Rev. 593 (2009) (initially given as the Arlin M. and Neysa Adams Lecture, October 2009).
- Trade Regulation: Cases and Materials, Casebook (with Robert Pitofsky & Harvey J. Goldschmid) (4th ed. 1997 to 6th ed. 2010).
- The Bedrock of Individual Rights in Times of Natural Disaster, 51 Howard L.J. 747 (2008).
- 'Original Intent' Versus 'Evolution', The Scrivener 7 (Summer 2005) (also published in Green Bag Almanac & Reader 267 (2007)).
- Our 18th Century Constitution in the 21st Century World, 80 N.Y.U. L. Rev. 1079 (2005).
- Reflections on the Judicial Oath, 8 Green Bag 2d 177 (2005).
- The Rule of Law in Times of Stress, 70 U. Chi. L. Rev. 455 (2003).
- International Harmonization of Antitrust Law: The Tortoise or the Hare?, 3 Chi. J. Int'l L. 391 (2002).
- Sex Discrimination in Life and Law, 1999 U. Chi. Legal F. 1.
- Generalist Judges in a Specialized World, 50 SMU L. Rev. 1755 (1997).
- The Impossible Dream: Real International Antitrust, 1992 U. Chi. Legal F. 277.
- 'Unfair' Trade Injury: A Competition-Based Approach, 41 Stan. L. Rev. 1153 (1989).
- Class Actions: Joinder or Representational Device?, 1983 S. Ct. Rev. 459.

== Personal life ==
Wood is married to Robert L. Sufit, a professor of neurology at Northwestern University's Feinberg School of Medicine, to whom she was introduced by her fellow Seventh Circuit Judge Ilana Rovner. She has six children, including three stepchildren, from her previous two marriages.

She was married from 1978 to 1998 to Dennis J. Hutchinson, a professor at the University of Chicago Law School. Wood married her first husband, Steve Van, while both were law students.

She plays oboe and English horn in the North Shore Chamber Orchestra in Evanston, Illinois, in the Chicago Bar Association Symphony Orchestra, and in the West Suburban Concert Band in LaGrange, Illinois.

Wood lives in Hinsdale, Illinois, and is Protestant.

== See also ==
- List of law clerks for the second seat of the Supreme Court of the United States
- Barack Obama Supreme Court candidates
- Hively v. Ivy Tech

Legal offices
Preceded by William J. Bauer	Judge of the United States Court of Appeals for the Seventh Circuit; 1995–2022	Succeeded by John Z. Lee
Preceded by Frank H. Easterbrook	Chief Judge of the United States Court of Appeals for the Seventh Circuit; 2013–2020	Succeeded by Diane S. Sykes
