= Lindsay C. Jenkins =

American judge (born 1977)

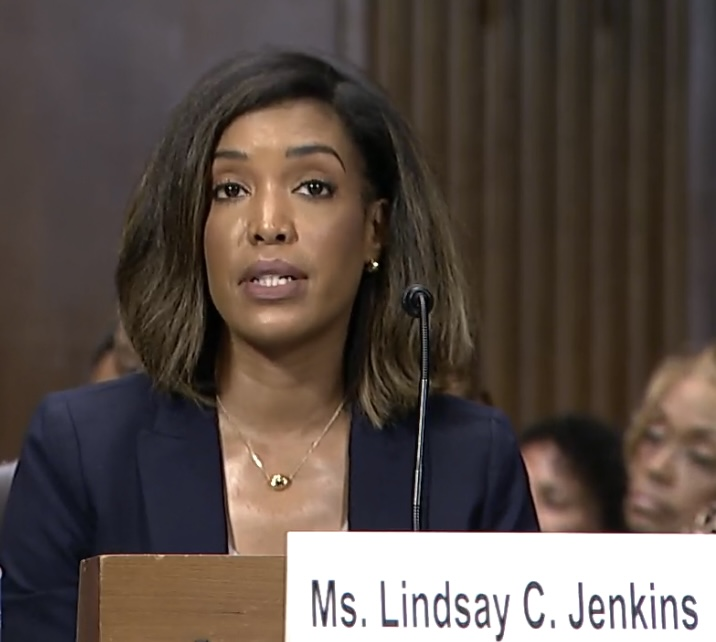

Judge of the United States District Court for the Northern District of Illinois
- Incumbent
- Assumed office February 24, 2023
- Appointed by: Joe Biden
- Preceded by: John Z. Lee

Personal details
- Born: Lindsey Carole Clayton; 1977 (age 48–49) Cleveland, Ohio, U.S.
- Education: Miami University (BA); Cleveland State University (JD)

Lindsay Carole Jenkins (née Clayton; born 1977) is an American judicial officer who is serving as a federal judge in the United States District Court for the Northern District of Illinois. She is a former assistant United States attorney from Illinois.

== Education ==
Jenkins received a Bachelor of Arts from Miami University in 1998 and a Juris Doctor, summa cum laude, from Cleveland–Marshall College of Law of Cleveland State University in 2002.

== Career ==
From 2002 to 2004, she served as a law clerk for Judge Solomon Oliver Jr. of the United States District Court for the Northern District of Ohio. From 2004 to 2006, she was an associate at Jones Day. From 2006 to 2021, she was an assistant United States attorney in the United States Attorney's Office for the Northern District of Illinois; she has served in roles, including Deputy Chief and later Chief of the General Crimes section and eventually Chief of the Violent Crimes section. From 2021 to 2023, she was a partner at Cooley LLP in Chicago, where her focus was on white collar crime.

She has taught trial advocacy courses at Loyola University Chicago School of Law and at the Northwestern University Pritzker School of Law on the Chicago gun violence epidemic.

=== Notable prosecutions ===
In 2015, Jenkins helped prosecute Chicago's public schools chief Barbara Byrd-Bennett. Byrd-Bennett pleaded guilty in federal court to using her position as chief executive officer of the Chicago Public Schools to guide lucrative no-bid contracts to her former employer in exchange for bribes and kickbacks.

In 2016, Jenkins was part of a team of lawyers from the United States Department of Justice that investigated the force practices of the Chicago Police Department, being part of the prosecution team in United States v. Aldo Brown.

=== Federal judicial service ===
In December 2021, Jenkins was recommended to the president by Senators Dick Durbin and Tammy Duckworth. On July 14, 2022, President Joe Biden announced his intent to nominate Jenkins to serve as a United States district judge of the United States District Court for the Northern District of Illinois. On September 19, 2022, her nomination was sent to the Senate. President Biden nominated Jenkins to the seat vacated by Judge John Z. Lee, who was elevated to the United States Court of Appeals for the Seventh Circuit on September 12, 2022.

On October 12, 2022, a hearing on her nomination was held before the Senate Judiciary Committee. On December 1, 2022, her nomination was reported out of committee by a 15–7 vote. On January 3, 2023, her nomination was returned to the President under Rule XXXI, Paragraph 6 of the United States Senate; she was renominated later the same day.

On February 2, 2023, her nomination was reported out of committee by a 14–6 vote. On February 14, 2023, the Senate invoked cloture on her nomination by a 58–41 vote. That same day, her nomination was confirmed by a 59–40 vote. She received her judicial commission on February 24, 2023.

She was sworn in on February 27, 2023.

=== Notable rulings ===
On April 18, 2023, Jenkins dismissed a lawsuit against a school district by a parent claiming his parental rights were violated under the 14th Amendment, alleging the school district facilitated his child's gender transition.

On April 27, 2023, Jenkins declined to block enforcement of the Protect Illinois Communities Act, an assault weapons ban. In reasoning that the assault weapons ban is consistent with the Supreme Court holding in Bruen, Jenkins said "because assault weapons are particularly dangerous weapons and high-capacity magazines are particularly dangerous weapon accessories, their regulation accords with history and tradition." The 7th Circuit subsequently affirmed Jenkins' ruling on November 4, 2023.

== See also ==
- List of African-American federal judges
- List of African-American jurists

Legal offices
Preceded by John Z. Lee	Judge of the United States District Court for the Northern District of Illinois; 2023–present	Incumbent
