= Richard Leroy Williams =

American judge

Senior Judge of the United States District Court for the Eastern District of Virginia
- In office May 1, 1992 – February 19, 2011

Judge of the United States District Court for the Eastern District of Virginia
- In office September 30, 1980 – May 1, 1992
- Appointed by: Jimmy Carter
- Preceded by: Seat established by 92 Stat. 1629
- Succeeded by: Raymond Alvin Jackson

Personal details
- Born: Richard Leroy Williams; April 6, 1923 Morrisville, Virginia
- Died: February 19, 2011 (aged 87) Richmond, Virginia
- Education: University of Virginia School of Law (LLB)

Richard Leroy Williams (April 6, 1923 – February 19, 2011) was Virginia state judge and later a United States district judge of the United States District Court for the Eastern District of Virginia.

== Education and career ==
Born in Morrisville, Virginia in 1923, Williams was the son of a police officer and a farm wife. He joined the United States Army Air Forces at age 17 and served during World War II, including as a survivor of the Japanese attack on Pearl Harbor in 1941. After the war, Williams received a Bachelor of Laws in 1951 from the University of Virginia School of Law. He then began the private practice of law in Richmond, Virginia from 1951 to 1972, becoming a founding partner in the firm that would later be known as McGuireWoods. In 1972, Williams was selected as a judge of the circuit court of the City of Richmond. He served as a circuit court judge and a lecturer at the University of Virginia School of Law until 1976, before returning to the private practice of law.

== Federal judicial service ==
Williams was nominated by President Jimmy Carter on April 9, 1979, to the United States District Court for the Eastern District of Virginia, to a new seat authorized by 92 Stat. 1629. He was confirmed by the United States Senate on September 29, 1980, and received his commission on September 30, 1980. He assumed senior status on May 1, 1992. His service terminated on February 19, 2011, due to his death of natural causes at his home in Richmond.

== Sources ==
Legal offices
Preceded by Seat established by 92 Stat. 1629	Judge of the United States District Court for the Eastern District of Virginia; 1980–1992	Succeeded by Raymond Alvin Jackson
