= David H. Coar =

American judge (born 1943)

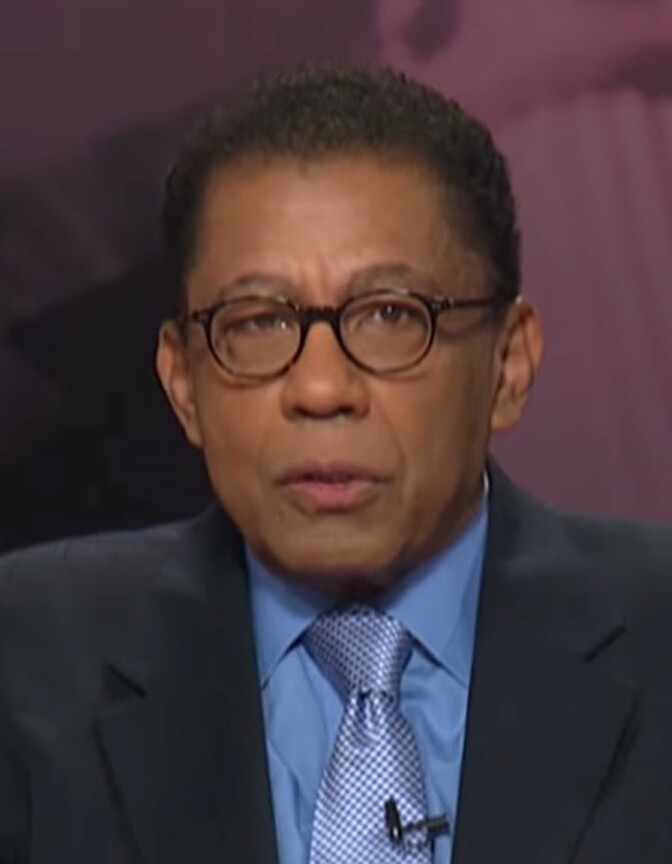
- Coar in 2014

Senior Judge of the United States District Court for the Northern District of Illinois
- In office August 12, 2009 – December 31, 2010

Judge of the United States District Court for the Northern District of Illinois
- In office October 7, 1994 – August 12, 2009
- Appointed by: Bill Clinton
- Preceded by: Ilana Rovner
- Succeeded by: John Z. Lee

Personal details
- Born: August 11, 1943 (age 82) Birmingham, Alabama
- Education: Syracuse University (BA); Loyola University Chicago School of Law (JD); Harvard Law School (LLM)

David Herndon Coar (born August 11, 1943) is a former United States district judge of the United States District Court for the Northern District of Illinois.

== Education and career ==
Born in Birmingham, Alabama, Coar received a Bachelor of Arts degree from Syracuse University in 1964, a Juris Doctor from Loyola University Chicago School of Law in 1969, and a Master of Laws from Harvard Law School in 1970. He was a United States Marine Corps Sergeant in 1965. and United States Marine Corps Reserve Sergeant from 1965 to 1971. He was a Legal intern for the NAACP Legal Defense and Educational Fund in New York City from 1970 to 1971. Coar entered private practice in Mobile, Alabama from 1971 to 1972, then in Birmingham from 1973 to 1974. He was an Associate professor and associate dean of the DePaul University College of Law from 1974 to 1979 and from 1982 to 1986. He was a United States Trustee for the Northern District of Illinois from 1979 to 1982. He was a visiting professor of law at the College of William and Mary, Marshall-Wythe Law School in 1985 and was the first Black person to teach at the law school. Coar served as a United States Bankruptcy Judge for the Northern District of Illinois from 1986 to 1994.

== Federal judicial service ==
On August 16, 1994, Coar was nominated by President Bill Clinton to a seat on the United States District Court for the Northern District of Illinois vacated by Ilana Rovner. Coar was confirmed by the United States Senate on October 6, 1994, and received his commission on October 7, 1994. He assumed senior status August 12, 2009 and retired December 31, 2010.

== Post judicial service ==
In 2013 he was named to co-lead a commission with Benjamin K. Miller to draw a path to Bond Court reform for the state of Illinois. The next year the commission issued a comprehensive report detailing the problems of the system and gave forty recommendations for reform.

== See also ==
- List of African-American federal judges
- List of African-American jurists

Legal offices
Preceded by Ilana Rovner	Judge of the United States District Court for the Northern District of Illinois; 1994–2009	Succeeded by John Z. Lee
