= Ilana Rovner =

Latvian-American judge (born 1938)

Senior Judge of the United States Court of Appeals for the Seventh Circuit
- Incumbent
- Assumed office July 10, 2024

Judge of the United States Court of Appeals for the Seventh Circuit
- In office August 17, 1992 – July 10, 2024
- Appointed by: George H. W. Bush
- Preceded by: Harlington Wood Jr.
- Succeeded by: Nancy L. Maldonado

Judge of the United States District Court for the Northern District of Illinois
- In office September 12, 1984 – August 17, 1992
- Appointed by: Ronald Reagan
- Preceded by: Joel Flaum
- Succeeded by: David H. Coar

Personal details
- Born: Ilana Kara Diamond; 1938 (age 87–88) Riga, Latvia
- Party: Republican
- Spouse: Richard Rovner (died 2009)
- Children: 1
- Education: Bryn Mawr College (BA); King's College London; Georgetown University; Illinois Institute of Technology (JD)

Ilana Kara Diamond Rovner (Latvian: Ilana Rovnere, born 1938) is a senior United States circuit judge of the United States Court of Appeals for the Seventh Circuit. Rovner was the first woman appointed to the Seventh Circuit. She was previously a United States district judge of the United States District Court for the Northern District of Illinois.

== Early life, education and career ==
Rovner was born in Riga, Latvia to middle-class Jewish parents. While an infant, she and her mother immigrated to the United States during World War II from Latvia to escape its occupation by Nazi Germany. She earned her Artium Baccalaureus degree from Bryn Mawr College in 1960. She studied at King's College London for one year and attended Georgetown University Law Center for two years before moving to Chicago. She received a Juris Doctor from Chicago-Kent College of Law in 1966. She was a legal researcher for Richard J. Phelan of Chicago, Illinois in 1971.

She was a law clerk for Judge James Benton Parsons of the United States District Court for the Northern District of Illinois from 1972 to 1973. She was an assistant United States attorney of the Northern District of Illinois from 1973 to 1977, serving as Deputy Chief of the Public Protection Unit from 1975 to 1976 and chief of the Public Protection Unit from 1976 to 1977. She was a deputy governor and legal counsel for Governor James R. Thompson of Illinois from 1977 to 1984. Her husband, Richard Rovner, died in 2009.

=== Federal judicial service ===
On June 19, 1984, President Ronald Reagan nominated Rovner to a seat on the United States District Court for the Northern District of Illinois vacated by Judge Joel Flaum. She was confirmed by the United States Senate on September 12, 1984, and received commission the same day. Her service was terminated on August 17, 1992, due to elevation to the court of appeals.

On July 2, 1992, President George H. W. Bush nominated Rovner to a seat on the United States Court of Appeals for the Seventh Circuit vacated by Judge Harlington Wood Jr. She was confirmed by the United States Senate on August 12, 1992, and received her commission on August 17, 1992.

On January 12, 2024, Rovner informed President Joe Biden that she would be assuming senior status upon confirmation of her successor. She assumed senior status on July 10, 2024.

=== Notable cases ===
On April 20, 2018, Rovner ruled against President Donald Trump's policy punishing sanctuary cities. She said allowing federal agencies to add conditions to grant funds without explicit congressional authority could lead to "tyranny." Rovner wrote, "The Attorney General in this case used the sword of federal funding to conscript state and local authorities to aid in federal civil immigration enforcement. But the power of the purse rests with Congress, which authorized the federal funds at issue and did not impose any immigration enforcement conditions on the receipt of such funds. It falls to us, the judiciary, as the remaining branch of the government, to act as a check on such usurpation of power." Rovner was joined by Judge William J. Bauer upholding the nationwide injunction against the policy. Judge Daniel Anthony Manion partially dissented, saying he would narrow the injunction to protect only the city of Chicago.

On August 27, 2019, Rovner joined Judge David Hamilton in blocking Indiana's parental notification requirement for abortions for minors. Judge Michael Kanne dissented. On November 1, 2019, the 7th Circuit denied en banc by a vote of 6–5, with Rovner in the majority. Judge Frank Easterbrook, who provided a decisive vote, called on the Supreme Court to hear the case. In July 2020, the Supreme Court ordered a re-hearing in the case.

On October 16, 2025, Rovner was one of three judges who blocked the Trump administration from deploying the National Guard against protesters in Chicago.. The Trump administration appealed to the Supreme Court, and on December 23, 2025, the Supreme Court declined to reverse the ruling blocking National Guard deployment.

== See also ==
- List of United States federal judges by longevity of service

Legal offices
Preceded by Joel Flaum	Judge of the United States District Court for the Northern District of Illinois; 1984–1992	Succeeded by David H. Coar
Preceded by Harlington Wood Jr.	Judge of the United States Court of Appeals for the Seventh Circuit; 1992–2024	Succeeded by Nancy L. Maldonado
