= Bench memorandum =

Document summarizing case issues for a judge

A bench memorandum (pl. bench memoranda) (also known as a bench memo) is a short and neutral memorandum that summarizes the facts, issues, and arguments of a court case. Bench memos are used by the judge as a reference during preparation for trial, the hearing of lawyers' arguments, and the drafting of a decision and also to give the judge an idea of the arguments given by each side in the court case. Bench memos are generally written by the judge's law clerk.

== See also ==
- Judicial clerkship
- Legal brief
