= Robert L. Sufit =

American neurologist

Robert L. Sufit (born July 1950) is a professor of neurology at Northwestern University's Feinberg School of Medicine in Chicago and the husband of Judge Diane Wood, who retired from the United States Court of Appeals for the Seventh Circuit in May 2024 and is now the Director of the American Law Institute. Sufit received his Bachelor of Arts and Master of Arts in chemistry from Johns Hopkins University. He studied medicine at the University of Virginia School of Medicine and completed a residency in neurology at the University of Pittsburgh. Sufit studies peripheral nervous system disorders. He currently directs the Lois Insolia ALS Clinic at Northwestern Memorial Hospital, where he treats patients diagnosed with ALS.
