= Dennis J. Hutchinson =

American legal scholar (born 1946)

Dennis J. Hutchinson (born December 1946) is an American legal scholar. After beginning his teaching career at the Georgetown University Law Center, Hutchinson joined the University of Chicago Law School in 1981. Currently, he is the William Rainey Harper Professor at the University of Chicago, a senior lecturer in law, and master of the undergraduate college's New Collegiate Division where he is the founding director of the Law, Letters, and Society (LLSO) program. His interests primarily lie in the field constitutional law, paying special attention to issues of race. He is best known within the legal community at large for his work as editor of the Law School's Supreme Court Review.

== Life and career ==
Hutchinson graduated summa cum laude from Bowdoin College, studying briefly as a JD candidate at the University of Chicago Law School before attending Magdalen College, Oxford, as a Rhodes Scholar in Jurisprudence, where he graduated with a B.A. and M.A. Upon returning to the United States, he completed his formal studies at the University of Texas Law School, where he received an LLM. Hutchinson then served as a law clerk to Justice William O. Douglas and Justice Byron White of the Supreme Court of the United States. His biography of Byron "Whizzer" White was a New York Times 'Notable Book' for 1998. Hutchinson co-edited The Forgotten Memoir of John Knox: A Year in the Life of a Supreme Court Clerk in FDR's Washington in 2002, with David J. Garrow. He received the Quantrell Award.

He was previously married to Judge Diane Wood, who served on the United States Court of Appeals for the Seventh Circuit, and who remains an academic colleague.

Hutchinson was one of several law faculty members who were called upon by various media sources to provide commentary about President Barack Obama's tenure teaching constitutional law at the school, and was largely supportive.

== See also ==
- List of law clerks for the fourth seat of the Supreme Court of the United States
- List of law clerks for the sixth seat of the Supreme Court of the United States
