= William J. Bauer =

American judge (1926–2025)

William Bauer
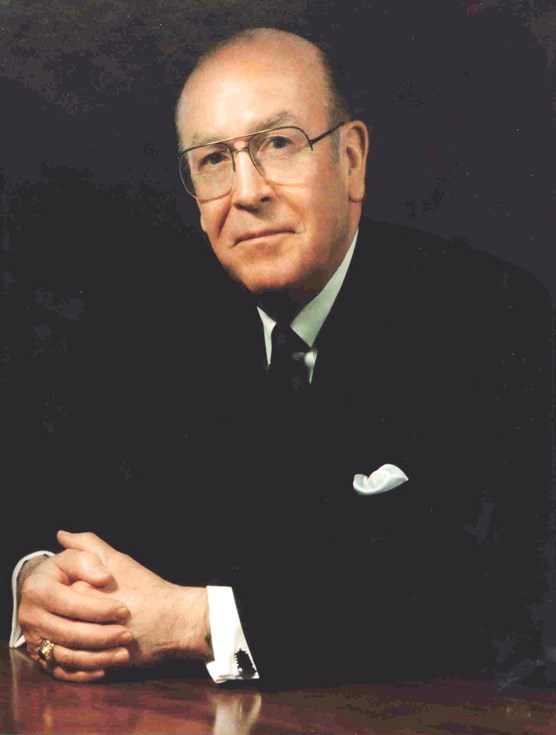

Senior Judge of the United States Court of Appeals for the Seventh Circuit
- In office October 31, 1994 – December 15, 2025

Chief Judge of the United States Court of Appeals for the Seventh Circuit
- In office September 1986 – July 31, 1993
- Preceded by: Walter J. Cummings Jr.
- Succeeded by: Richard Posner

Judge of the United States Court of Appeals for the Seventh Circuit
- In office December 20, 1974 – October 31, 1994
- Appointed by: Gerald Ford
- Preceded by: Otto Kerner Jr.
- Succeeded by: Diane Wood

Judge of the United States District Court for the Northern District of Illinois
- In office November 10, 1971 – January 3, 1975
- Appointed by: Richard Nixon
- Preceded by: Joseph Sam Perry
- Succeeded by: Alfred Younges Kirkland Sr.

Personal details
- Born: William Joseph Bauer; September 15, 1926 Chicago, Illinois, U.S.
- Died: December 15, 2025 (aged 99) North Riverside, Illinois, U.S.
- Spouse: Patricia Spratt (m. 2013)
- Education: Elmhurst College (AB); DePaul University (JD)

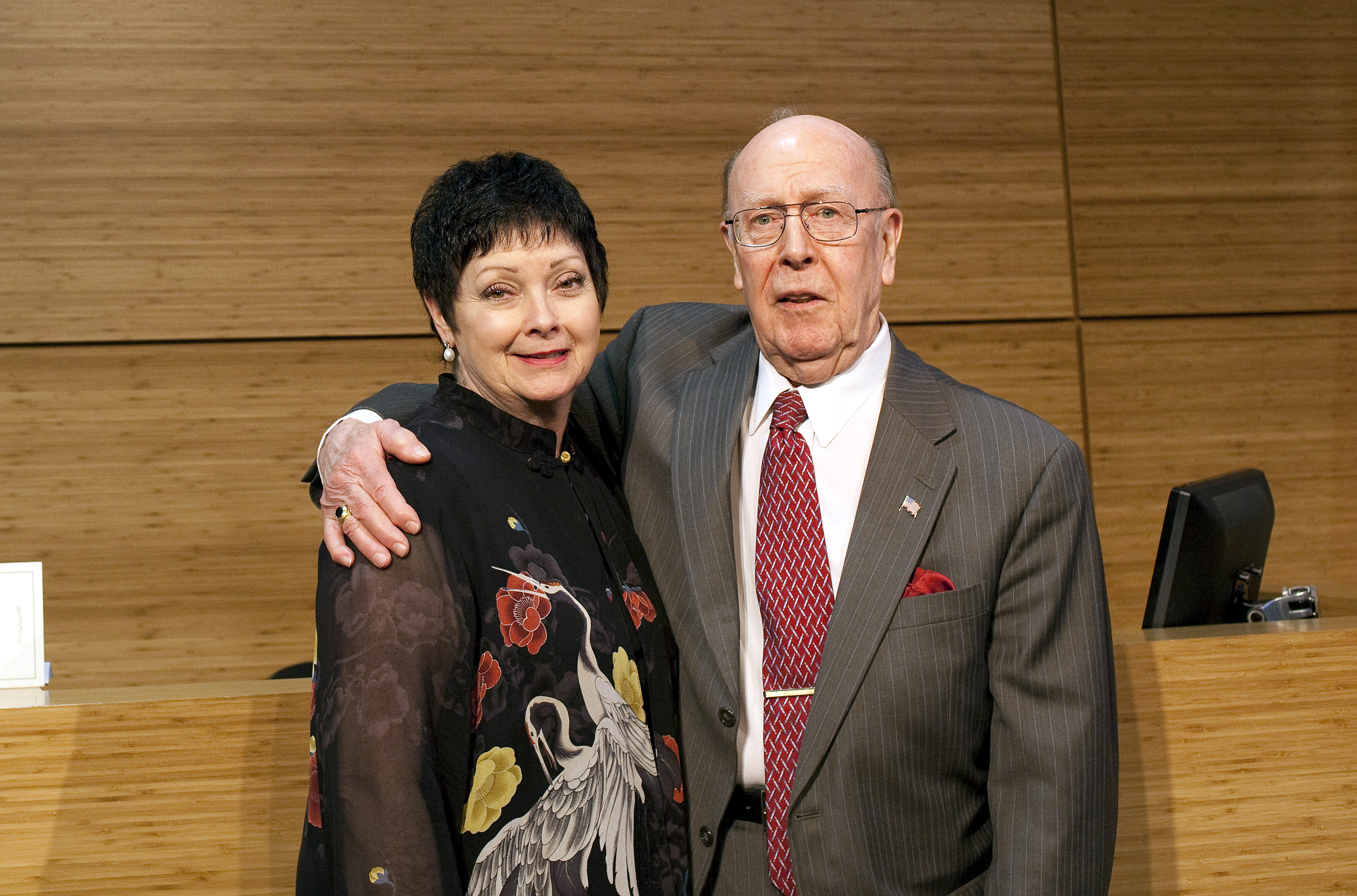
Bauer in 2012, with his future wife Patricia Spratt

William Joseph Bauer (September 15, 1926 – December 15, 2025) was an American judge who was a senior circuit judge of the United States Court of Appeals for the Seventh Circuit in Chicago from 1974 until his death, having been nominated to the position by President Gerald Ford. He previously was a United States district judge of the United States District Court for the Northern District of Illinois from 1971 until 1975, having been nominated by President Richard Nixon. He was known for presiding over the Amoco Cadiz oil spill case.

== Early life ==
William Joseph Bauer was born on September 15, 1926, in Chicago, Illinois. He served in the United States Army from 1945 to 1947. He received an Artium Baccalaureus degree in 1949 from Elmhurst College and a Juris Doctor in 1952 from DePaul University College of Law.

== Career ==
Bauer served as an assistant state's attorney in DuPage County, Illinois, from 1952 to 1956, serving as first assistant state's attorney from 1956 to 1958 and serving as state's attorney from 1959 to 1964. He was an instructor at Elmhurst College from 1952 to 1959 and was in private practice in Illinois from 1953 to 1964.

Bauer served as a Judge of the Illinois Circuit Court for the Eighteenth Judicial Circuit from 1964 to 1970. He was the United States Attorney for the Northern District of Illinois from 1970 to 1971.

=== Federal judicial service ===
Bauer was nominated by President Richard Nixon on September 14, 1971, to a seat on the United States District Court for the Northern District of Illinois vacated by Judge Joseph Sam Perry. He was confirmed by the United States Senate on November 8, 1971, and received his commission on November 10, 1971. His service terminated on January 3, 1975, due to elevation to the Seventh Circuit.

Bauer was nominated by President Gerald Ford on December 11, 1974, to a seat on the United States Court of Appeals for the Seventh Circuit vacated by Judge Otto Kerner Jr. He was confirmed by the Senate on December 19, 1974, and received his commission on December 20, 1974. He served as Chief Judge from 1986 to 1993. His most famous decisions include the Amoco Cadiz oil spill case.

He assumed senior status on October 31, 1994. He was a Member of the Judicial Conference of the United States from 1987 to 1993.

On April 19, 2018, Bauer wrote the majority opinion striking down Indiana's ban on abortion due to disability as unconstitutional. Bauer was joined by Joel Flaum, over the dissent of Daniel Anthony Manion. This part was upheld in Box v. Planned Parenthood.

On September 30, 2022, at the age of 96, Bauer transitioned to inactive senior status on the Court of Appeals.

== Personal life and legacy ==
Bauer was inducted as a Laureate of The Lincoln Academy of Illinois and awarded the Order of Lincoln (the state's highest honor) by the Governor of Illinois in 2010 in the area of Government & Law.

In 2013, Bauer married Patricia Spratt, an appellate litigator and a shareholder of the firm Shefsky & Froelich. She had previously clerked for Bauer in 1991 and 1992. In 2015, the Illinois Supreme Court appointed Spratt to a vacant judgeship on the 7th subcircuit of the Cook County Circuit Court. She was elected to the judgeship in 2016, and won retention in 2022.

Bauer died in North Riverside, Illinois, on December 15, 2025, at the age of 99.

== See also ==
- List of United States federal judges by longevity of service

Legal offices
Preceded by Joseph Sam Perry	Judge of the United States District Court for the Northern District of Illinois; 1971–1975	Succeeded by Alfred Younges Kirkland Sr.
Preceded by Otto Kerner Jr.	Judge of the United States Court of Appeals for the Seventh Circuit; 1974–1994	Succeeded by Diane Wood
Preceded by Walter J. Cummings Jr.	Chief Judge of the United States Court of Appeals for the Seventh Circuit; 1986–1993	Succeeded by Richard Posner
