= Hundley House =

Historic house in Alabama, United States

- U.S. National Register of Historic Places
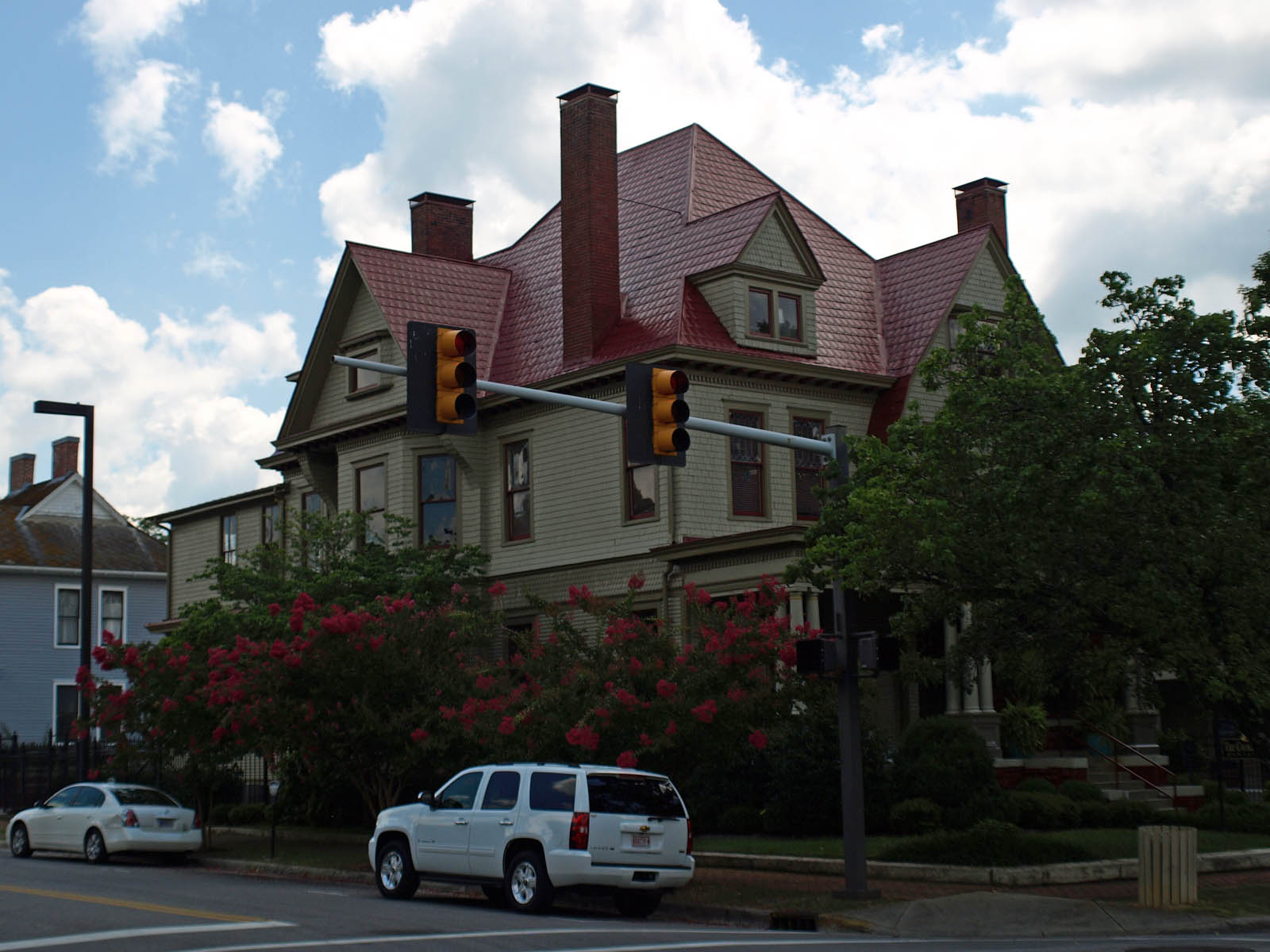
- The house in July 2010

- Location within Huntsville, Alabama Location within Alabama Location within the United States
- Location: 401 Madison St., Huntsville, Alabama
- Coordinates: 34°43′43″N 86°35′4″W
- Area: less than one acre
- Built: 1900
- Architectural style: Queen Anne, Colonial Revival, Shingle Style
- NRHP reference No.: 78000497
- Added to NRHP: May 22, 1978

The Hundley House is a historic residence in Huntsville, Alabama. The house was built in 1900 by Oscar Richard Hundley, a lawyer who served as City Attorney, State Representative, State Senator, and was appointed a judge to the United States District Court for the Northern District of Alabama. Soon after, he built three rental houses, two directly behind his house and one a block away. Hundley left Huntsville for Birmingham in 1909 and the house was later used as a funeral home and offices.

The house was one of the last large houses built in close proximity to Courthouse Square. It is based on the Queen Anne style, but features Colonial Revival and Shingle Style details. The front façade has a round bay on one corner and full-width porch below a large gambrel gable. The steeply pitched hipped roof is covered in red-painted metal with numerous protruding gabled bays and dormers. The ground floor is clad with clapboards and the second floor with square shakes.

The house was listed on the National Register of Historic Places in 1978.
