= Seybourn Lynne =

Seybourn Lynne may refer to:

- Seybourn Arthur Lynne (1877–?), Alabama politician
- Seybourn Harris Lynne (1907–2000), Alabama judge
