= Karon O. Bowdre =

American judge (born 1955)

Karon Owen Bowdre

Senior Judge of the United States District Court for the Northern District of Alabama
- Incumbent
- Assumed office April 25, 2020

Chief Judge of the United States District Court for the Northern District of Alabama
- In office November 18, 2013 – December 31, 2019
- Preceded by: Sharon Lovelace Blackburn
- Succeeded by: L. Scott Coogler

Judge of the United States District Court for the Northern District of Alabama
- In office November 8, 2001 – April 25, 2020
- Appointed by: George W. Bush
- Preceded by: Sam C. Pointer Jr.
- Succeeded by: Anna M. Manasco

Personal details
- Born: Karon Lynn Owen; April 25, 1955 (age 70) Montgomery, Alabama, U.S.
- Spouse(s): J. Birch Bowdre, Jr.
- Education: Samford University (BA); Cumberland School of Law (JD)

Karon Lynn Owen Bowdre (born April 25, 1955) is a senior United States district judge of the United States District Court for the Northern District of Alabama. She also serves as chair of the board of trustees of Samford University.

== Early life and education ==
Born in Montgomery, Alabama, Bowdre graduated from Samford University with her Bachelor of Arts degree in 1977 and later from Cumberland School of Law at Samford University with a Juris Doctor in 1981.

== Career ==
Bowdre was a law clerk for Judge Junius Foy Guin, Jr. of the United States District Court for the Northern District of Alabama from 1981 to 1982. Bowdre was a partner at the Birmingham, Alabama, firm of Rives & Peterson from 1982 to 1990. Beginning in 1989, Bowdre became a full-time Professor of law at Samford University Cumberland School of Law where she taught insurance law, legal ethics, and professional responsibility, and directed Cumberland’s legal research and writing program before her federal appointment in 2001. Bowdre was first elected to Samford's board of trustees in 2008. She became chair of the board on September 9, 2023.

=== Federal judicial service ===
On September 4, 2001, Bowdre was nominated to the United States District Court for the Northern District of Alabama by President George W. Bush. She was nominated to the seat vacated by Judge Sam Clyde Pointer Jr. Bowdre was confirmed by the Senate on November 6, 2001, and received her commission on November 8, 2001. She served as Chief Judge of the United States District Court for the Northern District of Alabama from November 18, 2013 to December 31, 2019. She assumed senior status on April 25, 2020.

Legal offices
| Preceded by Sam C. Pointer Jr. | Judge of the United States District Court for the Northern District of Alabama; 2001–2020 | Succeeded by Anna M. Manasco |
| Preceded by Sharon Lovelace Blackburn | Chief Judge of the United States District Court for the Northern District of Alabama; 2013–2019 | Succeeded by L. Scott Coogler |
