= Annemarie Axon =

American judge (born 1973)

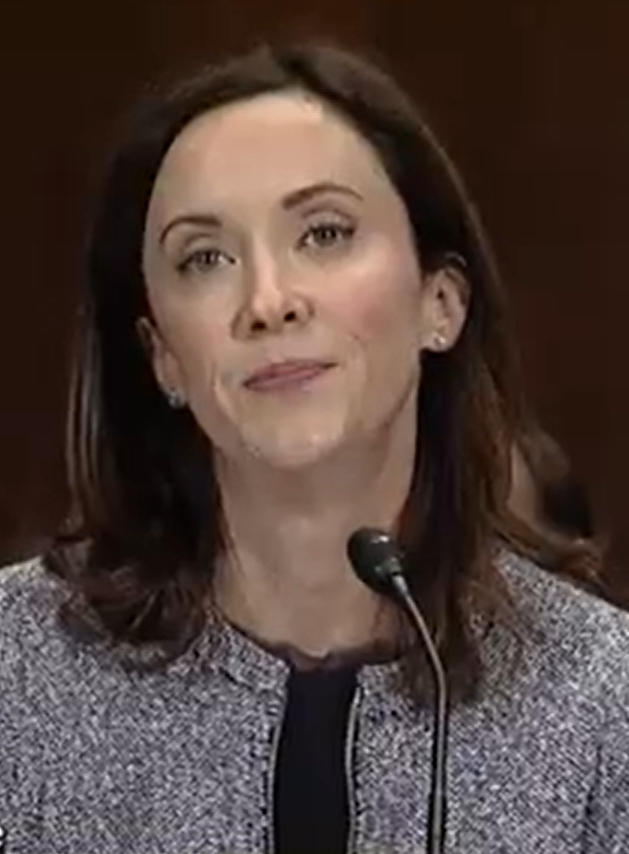

Judge of the United States District Court for the Northern District of Alabama
- Incumbent
- Assumed office June 12, 2018
- Appointed by: Donald Trump
- Preceded by: Sharon Lovelace Blackburn

Personal details
- Born: Annemarie Carney; 1973 (age 52–53) Winter Park, Florida, U.S.
- Education: University of Alabama (BA, JD)

Annemarie Axon (née Carney; born 1973) is a United States district judge of the United States District Court for the Northern District of Alabama.

== Biography ==
She received her Bachelor of Arts from the University of Alabama and Juris Doctor from the University of Alabama School of Law. Immediately upon graduation from law school, she served as a law clerk to Judge Inge Prytz Johnson of the United States District Court for the Northern District of Alabama.

Prior to beginning private practice, she served as Assistant Vice President of AmSouth Bank and as an associate at the law firm of Edwards and Angell, LLP in Providence, Rhode Island. Immediately before becoming a judge, she was a member of the Birmingham, Alabama law firm of Wallace, Jordan, Ratliff, & Brandt, LLC, where she litigated trust, estate, and business cases in both trial and appellate courts.

== Federal judicial service ==
On July 13, 2017, President Donald Trump announced his intent to nominate Axon to serve as a United States District Judge of the United States District Court for the Northern District of Alabama. On July 19, 2017, her nomination was officially transmitted to the United States Senate. She was nominated to the seat vacated by Judge Sharon Lovelace Blackburn, who assumed senior status on May 8, 2015. On September 20, 2017, a hearing on her nomination was held before the Senate Judiciary Committee. On October 19, 2017, her nomination was reported out of committee by voice vote.

On January 3, 2018, her nomination was returned to the President under Rule XXXI, Paragraph 6 of the United States Senate. On January 5, 2018, President Donald Trump announced his intent to renominate Axon to a federal judgeship. On January 8, 2018, her renomination was sent to the United States Senate. On January 18, 2018, her nomination was reported out of committee by a 17–4 vote. On June 5, 2018, the Senate invoked cloture on her nomination by an 84–11 vote.

On June 6, 2018, she was confirmed by an 83–11 vote. She received her judicial commission on June 12, 2018.

Legal offices
Preceded by Sharon Lovelace Blackburn	Judge of the United States District Court for the Northern District of Alabama; 2018–present	Incumbent
