= Hundley Rental Houses =

Historic houses in Alabama, United States

- U.S. National Register of Historic Places
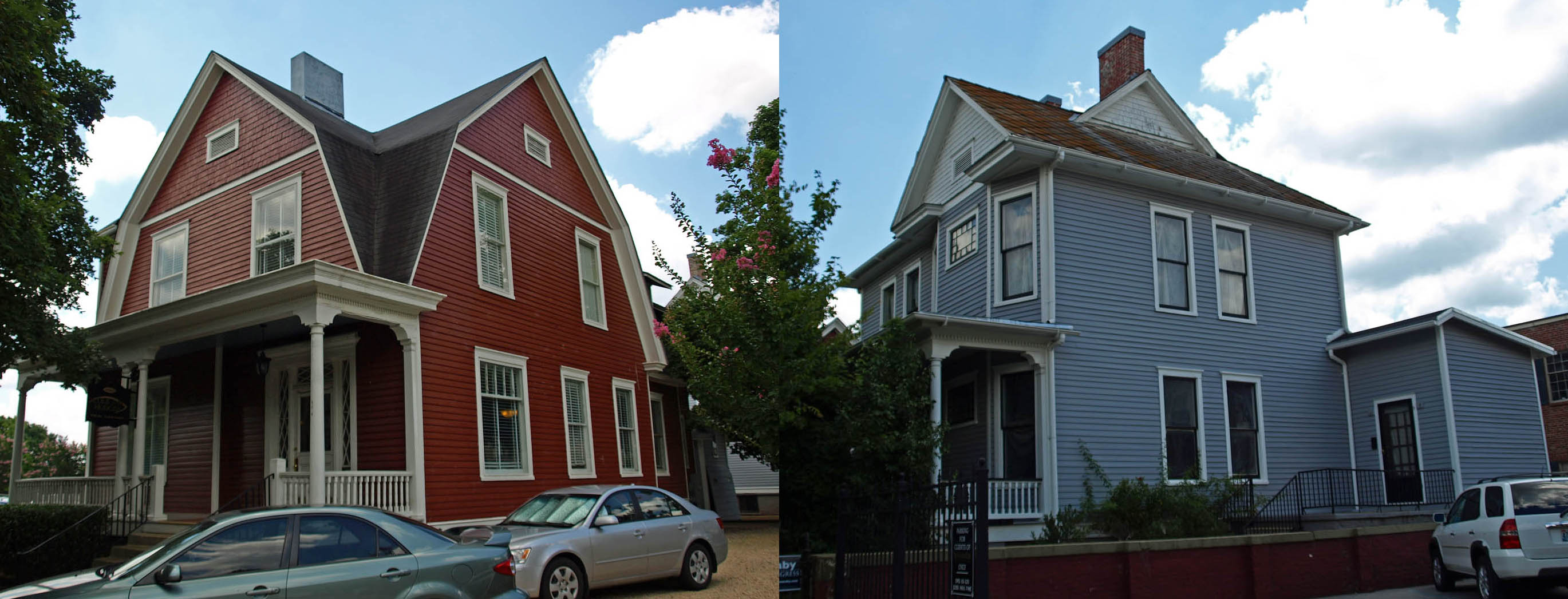
- 400 Franklin Street (left) and 108 Gates Avenue in July 2010

- Location within Huntsville, Alabama Location within Alabama Location within the United States
- Location: 108 Gates Ave. and 400 Franklin St., Huntsville, Alabama
- Coordinates: 34°43′44″N 86°35′2″W
- Area: 1 acre (0.40 ha)
- Built: 1905
- Architectural style: Colonial Revival, Dutch Colonial
- MPS: Downtown Huntsville MRA
- NRHP reference No.: 80000714
- Added to NRHP: September 22, 1980

The Hundley Rental Houses are historic residences in Huntsville, Alabama. The houses were built by Oscar Richard Hundley, a prominent local judge and politician. Hundley built the two houses behind his own, along with a third one block away, in 1905. The houses all represent the transition from Victorian styles popular in the late 19th century to Colonial Revival styles of the early 20th century. A fire damaged the house at 400 Franklin Street in 1909, and a rear addition was likely added at this time. Hundley sold his own house the same year, and sold 400 Franklin in 1912 and 108 Gates Avenue in 1918. The houses are in use today as offices.

108 Gates, also known as the Hundley-Van Valkenburgh House, is a two-story house with strong Victorian influences. The main roof is a Dutch gable, with the gable projecting over a chamfered bay. Both floors of the chamfered bay have a small, multi-light window, while all other windows on the house are one-over-one sashes.
400 Franklin, also known as the Hundley-Clark House, is a two-story Dutch Colonial Revival structure, with the second floor featuring large gambrel gables. Both houses have similar full-width, one story porches, supported by plain wooden columns with tapered capitals. The houses also have similar front doors, with a transom and sidelights with diamond-shaped panes, although 108 Gates lacks the sidelights.

The houses were listed on the National Register of Historic Places in 1980.
