= Crystal Clanton =

American attorney (born c. 1995/6)

Crystal Carolyn Clanton (born March 1995) is an American attorney. She previously clerked for United States Supreme Court Justice Clarence Thomas (2024–2025 term), Chief Judge William H. Pryor, Jr. of the United States Court of Appeals for the Eleventh Circuit, and Judge Corey L. Maze of the United States District Court for the Northern District of Alabama.

Clanton is a 2022 graduate of the Antonin Scalia Law School and is licensed to practice law in Alabama by the Alabama State Bar. She has also made an appearance on Megyn Kelly's show, The Kelly File.

== Biography ==
According to The New Yorker, Clanton was accused of sending a text message in 2015, while she was national field director for Turning Point USA, saying "I HATE BLACK PEOPLE. Like fuck them all . . . I hate blacks. End of story." Clanton told The New Yorker in 2017, "I have no recollection of these messages and they do not reflect what I believe or who I am and the same was true when I was a teenager." Mediaite in 2018 said she also had sent an anti-Arab message via Snapchat.

Following her departure from Turning Point USA, Clanton worked for Ginni Thomas, Justice Thomas's wife, and lived at the Thomases' house for almost a year. Ginni Thomas was a member of the Turning Point USA advisory council at the time of Clanton's departure.

In 2021 Maze and Pryor hired Clanton to clerk for each of them, first for Maze, then for Pryor. Seven Democratic members of Congress protested the hiring in a letter to Chief Justice John Roberts and Circuit Judge Charles Wilson, asking for an investigation, writing that Maze and Pryor "hired an individual with a history of nakedly racist and hateful conduct as a future law clerk in their chambers. Placing an individual with this history in such close proximity to judicial decision-making threatens to seriously undermine the public's faith in the federal judiciary." The investigation was not pursued after a ruling by the judicial council of the 2nd U.S. Circuit Court of Appeals, which stated that the judges had performed adequate due diligence, which included a reference letter from Justice Thomas. Thomas' letter said, "I know Crystal Clanton and I know bigotry. Bigotry is antithetical to her nature and character."
