= Robert Propst =

Robert Propst may refer to:

- Robert Propst (inventor) (1921–2000), American inventor
- Robert Bruce Propst (1931–2019), American judge
