= Judge Blackburn =

Judge Blackburn may refer to:

- Richard Blackburn (1918–1987), judge in Australia before becoming chief justice of the Australian Capital Territory
- Robert E. Blackburn (born 1950), judge of the United States District Court for the District of Colorado
- Sharon Lovelace Blackburn (born 1950), judge of the United States District Court for the Northern District of Alabama
