= Harold Mooty =

American judge (born 1983)

Harold Dean Mooty III
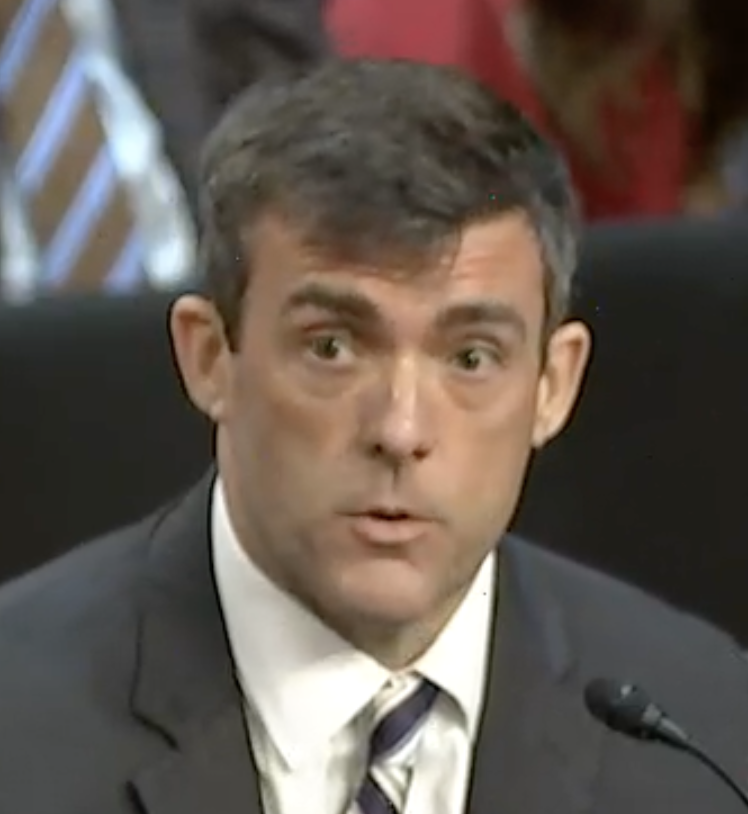

Judge of the United States District Court for the Northern District of Alabama
- Incumbent
- Assumed office October 21, 2025
- Appointed by: Donald Trump
- Preceded by: Abdul K. Kallon

Personal details
- Born: 1983 (age 42–43) Tuscaloosa, Alabama, U.S.
- Education: University of Alabama (BS, JD)

Harold Dean "Hal" Mooty III (born 1983) is an American lawyer who has served as a United States district judge of the United States District Court for the Northern District of Alabama since 2025.

== Early life and education ==
Mooty was born in 1983 in Tuscaloosa, Alabama. He received a Bachelor of Science degree from the University of Alabama in 2005, serving as President of the Student Government Association. He received a Juris Doctor from the University of Alabama School of Law in 2008, graduating The Order of Barristers.

== Career ==
Mooty was a partner at Bradley Arant Boult Cummings in its Huntsville office. He focused on commercial litigation, including contract disputes, shareholder disputes, and torts. He also practiced insurance, medical malpractice, and technology law.

=== Federal judicial service ===
On August 12, 2025, President Donald Trump announced his intention to nominate Mooty to an unspecified seat on the United States District Court for the Northern District of Alabama. On September 2, Trump formally nominated Mooty to the seat vacated by Judge Abdul K. Kallon. A hearing on his nomination was held the next day and his nomination was reported by the United States Senate Committee on the Judiciary on October 1, 2025 by a 18–4 vote. On October 16, cloture was invoked on his nomination by a 62–34 vote. On October 21, his nomination was confirmed by a 66–32 vote. He received his judicial commission on October 21 and he was sworn into office on October 22 by Senior Judge Charles Lynwood Smith Jr.

Legal offices
Preceded by Abdul K. Kallon	Judge of the United States District Court for the Northern District of Alabama; 2025–present	Incumbent
