= Propst =

Propst may refer to:

- Propst (title), German ecclesiastical title

== People ==
- Clyde Propst (died 1959), American college football coach
- Ed Propst, (born 1972), American politician from the Northern Marianas Islands
- Jake Propst (1895–1967), American baseball player
- Robert Propst (inventor) (1921–2000), American inventor
- Robert Bruce Propst (born 1931), American judge
- Rush Propst (born 1958), American football coach
