= Judge Proctor =

Judge Proctor may refer to:

- James McPherson Proctor (1882–1953), judge of the United States Court of Appeals for the District of Columbia Circuit
- R. David Proctor (born 1960), judge of the United States District Court for the Northern District of Alabama
