= Abdul K. Kallon =

American judge (born 1969)

Judge of the United States District Court for the Northern District of Alabama
- In office January 4, 2010 – August 31, 2022
- Appointed by: Barack Obama
- Preceded by: U. W. Clemon
- Succeeded by: Harold Mooty

Personal details
- Born: Abdul Karim Kallon; April 5, 1969 (age 57) Freetown, Sierra Leone
- Education: Dartmouth College (AB); University of Pennsylvania (JD); Duke University (LLM)

Abdul Karim Kallon (born April 5, 1969) is an American lawyer who is a former United States district judge of the United States District Court for the Northern District of Alabama. He is a former nominee to be a United States circuit judge of the United States Court of Appeals for the Eleventh Circuit.

== Early life and education ==
Born in Freetown, Sierra Leone, Kallon earned an Artium Baccalaureus degree from Dartmouth College in 1990. He earned a Juris Doctor in 1993 from the University of Pennsylvania Law School, where he served as Articles Editor for the University of Pennsylvania Journal of International Business Law. Kallon served as a law clerk for Judge U. W. Clemon of the United States District Court for the Northern District of Alabama from 1993 to 1994. In 2020, Kallon graduated from Duke Law School with a Master of Laws in judicial studies.

== Career ==
From 1994 to his judicial appointment, Kallon worked in private legal practice in Birmingham, Alabama. He practiced labor and employment law as a partner at the Birmingham law firm Bradley Arant Boult Cummings LLP.

=== Federal judicial service ===
On July 31, 2009, President Barack Obama nominated Kallon to be a judge on the United States District Court for the Northern District of Alabama. Kallon was nominated for the seat vacated by Clemon, who retired earlier in 2009. According to news accounts, Kallon had been recommended for the judgeship by a panel of legal experts assembled by United States Representative Artur Davis. However, his name was not on a list of candidates compiled by a committee of the Alabama Democratic Party. The United States Senate confirmed Kallon to his judgeship by unanimous consent on November 21, 2009. He received his commission on January 4, 2010.

On February 11, 2016, President Obama nominated Kallon to serve as a circuit judge of the United States Court of Appeals for the Eleventh Circuit, to the seat vacated by Judge Joel Fredrick Dubina, who took senior status on October 26, 2013. His nomination expired on January 3, 2017, with the end of the 114th Congress.

On April 6, 2022, Kallon announced he would resign from the court effective August 31, 2022. He joined Perkins Coie law firm as a partner after leaving the federal bench.

== See also ==
- Barack Obama judicial appointment controversies
- List of African-American federal judges
- List of African-American jurists

Legal offices
Preceded by U. W. Clemon	Judge of the United States District Court for the Northern District of Alabama; 2010–2022	Succeeded by Harold Mooty
