= Thomas Alexander Murphree =

American judge

Judge of the United States District Court for the Northern District of Alabama
- In office May 31, 1938 – September 5, 1945
- Appointed by: Franklin D. Roosevelt
- Preceded by: Seat established by 52 Stat. 120
- Succeeded by: Seybourn Harris Lynne

Personal details
- Born: Thomas Alexander Murphree; December 1, 1883 Blount County, Alabama
- Died: September 5, 1945 (aged 61)
- Education: University of Alabama (B.S.); University of Alabama School of Law (LL.B.)

Thomas Alexander Murphree (December 1, 1883 – September 5, 1945) was a United States district judge of the United States District Court for the Northern District of Alabama.

== Education and career ==
Born in Blount County, Alabama, Murphree received a Bachelor of Science degree from the University of Alabama in 1910 and a Bachelor of Laws from the University of Alabama School of Law in 1911. He was in private practice in Birmingham, Alabama from 1911 to 1938.

== Federal judicial service ==
On May 12, 1938, Murphree was nominated by President Franklin D. Roosevelt to a new seat on the United States District Court for the Northern District of Alabama created by 52 Stat. 120. He was confirmed by the United States Senate on May 17, 1938, and received his commission on May 31, 1938. Murphree served in that capacity until his death on September 5, 1945.

== Sources ==
Legal offices
Preceded by Seat established by 52 Stat. 120	Judge of the United States District Court for the Northern District of Alabama; 1938–1945	Succeeded by Seybourn Harris Lynne
