= Elbert Bertram Haltom Jr. =

American judge

Senior Judge of the United States District Court for the Northern District of Alabama
- In office December 31, 1991 – October 12, 2003

Judge of the United States District Court for the Northern District of Alabama
- In office May 30, 1980 – December 31, 1991
- Appointed by: Jimmy Carter
- Preceded by: Seat established by 92 Stat. 1629
- Succeeded by: Charles Lynwood Smith Jr.

Personal details
- Born: December 26, 1922 Florence, Alabama
- Died: October 12, 2003 (aged 80) Florence, Alabama
- Education: University of Alabama School of Law (LLB)

Elbert Bertram Haltom Jr. (December 26, 1922 – October 12, 2003) was a United States district judge of the United States District Court for the Northern District of Alabama.

== Education and career ==
Born in Florence, Alabama, Haltom was in the United States Army Air Corps as a Sergeant and Air Crew Gunner during World War II, from 1943 to 1945. He received a Bachelor of Laws from the University of Alabama School of Law in 1948. He was in private practice in Florence from 1948 to 1980. He was a member of the Alabama House of Representatives from 1954 to 1958 and of the Alabama Senate from 1958 to 1962.

== Federal judicial service ==
On January 10, 1980, Haltom was nominated by President Jimmy Carter to a new seat on the United States District Court for the Northern District of Alabama created by 92 Stat. 1629. He was confirmed by the United States Senate on May 29, 1980, and received his commission on May 30, 1980. He assumed senior status on December 31, 1991, serving in that capacity until his death on October 12, 2003, in Florence.

== Sources ==
Legal offices
Preceded by Seat established by 92 Stat. 1629	Judge of the United States District Court for the Northern District of Alabama; 1980–1991	Succeeded by Charles Lynwood Smith Jr.
