= Edmund LaCour =

American judge (born 1985)

Edmund Gerald LaCour Jr.
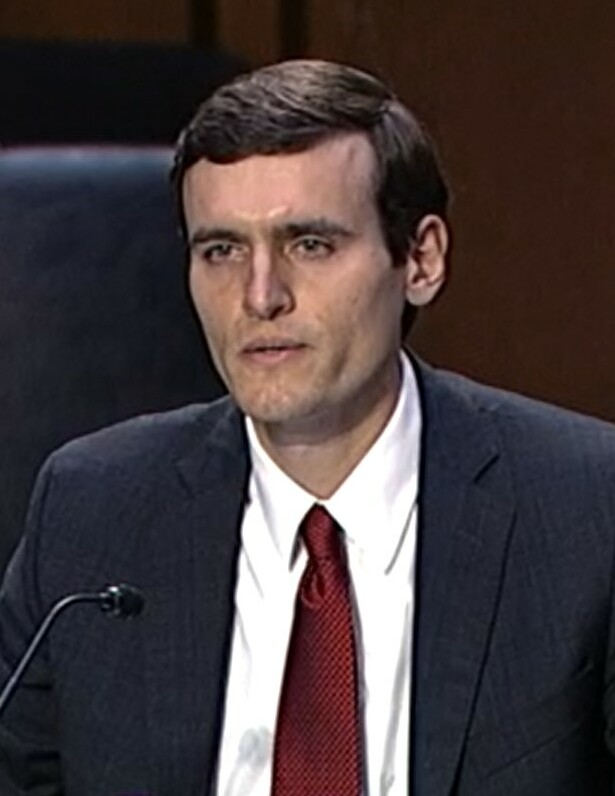

Judge of the United States District Court for the Northern District of Alabama
- Incumbent
- Assumed office November 3, 2025
- Appointed by: Donald Trump
- Preceded by: L. Scott Coogler

Solicitor General of Alabama
- In office May 3, 2019 – November 3, 2025
- Governor: Kay Ivey
- Preceded by: Andrew L. Brasher
- Succeeded by: Barrett Bowdre

Personal details
- Born: 1985 (age 40–41) Phoenix, Arizona, U.S.
- Party: Republican
- Education: Birmingham-Southern College (BA); Trinity College Dublin (MA); Yale University (JD)

Edmund Gerald LaCour Jr. (born 1985) is an American lawyer who is serving as a United States district judge of the United States District Court for the Northern District of Alabama since 2025. He served as the Solicitor General of Alabama from May 3, 2019, to October 2025. LaCour was nominated for federal judgeship once previously, in that instance for a seat in the United States District Court for the Middle District of Alabama.

== Early life, education and career ==
LaCour was born February 17, 1985, in Phoenix, Arizona. He received a Bachelor of Arts, summa cum laude, from Birmingham-Southern College, a Master of Arts from Trinity College Dublin, and a Juris Doctor from Yale Law School. After law school, LaCour served as a law clerk to Judge William H. Pryor Jr. of the United States Court of Appeals for the Eleventh Circuit. He then worked at Baker Botts and Bancroft PLLC. He later became a partner at Kirkland & Ellis, before being appointed Solicitor General of Alabama in May 2019. LaCour has argued cases before the Supreme Court of the United States, including Allen v. Milligan.

== Federal judicial nominations ==
=== Failed nomination to district court under Trump ===
On May 20, 2020, President Donald Trump announced his intent to nominate LaCour to serve as a United States district judge of the United States District Court for the Middle District of Alabama. On June 2, 2020, his nomination was sent to the Senate. President Trump nominated LaCour to the seat vacated by Judge Andrew L. Brasher, who was elevated to the United States Court of Appeals for the Eleventh Circuit. On January 3, 2021, his nomination was returned to the President under Rule XXXI, Paragraph 6 of the United States Senate. Later that same day, his renomination was sent to the Senate. LaCour's nomination was ultimately blocked by Democratic U.S. Senator Doug Jones, who refused to return a blue slip consenting to LaCour's confirmation. On February 4, 2021, his nomination was withdrawn by President Joe Biden.

=== Federal judicial service ===
On August 12, 2025, Donald Trump announced his intent to nominate LaCour for a position on the Northern District of Alabama court. On September 3, 2025, a confirmation hearing was held for LaCour and other nominees by the United States Senate Judiciary Committee. On October 1, 2025, the Senate Judiciary Committee voted to report his nomination to the full U.S. Senate by a 12–10 party-line vote. On October 28, 2025, the Senate invoked cloture on his nomination by a 53–46 vote. The next day, his nomination was confirmed by a 51–47 vote. He received his commission on November 3 and was sworn into office by Chief Circuit Judge William H. Pryor Jr. on November 4.

== See also ==
- Donald Trump judicial appointment controversies

Legal offices
Preceded by Andrew L. Brasher	Solicitor General of Alabama; 2019–2025	Succeeded by Barrett Bowdre
Preceded by L. Scott Coogler	Judge of the United States District Court for the Northern District of Alabama; 2025–present	Incumbent
