= David Jackson Davis =

American judge (1878–1938)

Judge of the United States District Court for the Northern District of Alabama
- In office December 10, 1935 – December 7, 1938
- Appointed by: Franklin D. Roosevelt
- Preceded by: William Irwin Grubb
- Succeeded by: Seat abolished

Personal details
- Born: David Jackson Davis; October 15, 1878 Wedowee, Alabama
- Died: December 7, 1938 (aged 60)
- Education: Yale Law School (LL.B.)

David Jackson Davis (October 15, 1878 – December 7, 1938) was a United States district judge of the United States District Court for the Northern District of Alabama.

== Education and career ==
Born in Wedowee, Alabama, Davis received a Bachelor of Laws from Yale Law School in 1906. He was in private practice in Birmingham, Alabama from 1906 to 1935.

== Federal judicial service ==
On December 10, 1935, Davis received a recess appointment from President Franklin D. Roosevelt to a seat on the United States District Court for the Northern District of Alabama vacated by Judge William Irwin Grubb. Formally nominated to the same seat by President Roosevelt on January 6, 1936, Davis was confirmed by the United States Senate on January 22, 1936, and received his commission on January 28, 1936. Davis served in that capacity until his death on December 7, 1938.

== Sources ==
Legal offices
Preceded by William Irwin Grubb	Judge of the United States District Court for the Northern District of Alabama; 1935–1938	Succeeded by Seat abolished
