= Liles C. Burke =

American judge (born 1969)

Liles Burke
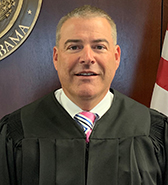

Judge of the United States District Court for the Northern District of Alabama
- Incumbent
- Assumed office October 17, 2018
- Appointed by: Donald Trump
- Preceded by: Charles Lynwood Smith Jr.

Judge of the Alabama Court of Criminal Appeals
- In office February 2011 – October 17, 2018
- Appointed by: Robert J. Bentley
- Preceded by: Alisa Kelli Wise
- Succeeded by: Chris McCool

Judge of the Marshall County District Court
- In office 2007–2011
- Appointed by: Bob Riley

Judge of the Arab Municipal Court
- In office 2001–2007

Personal details
- Born: 1969 (age 56–57) Cullman, Alabama, U.S.
- Party: Republican
- Education: University of Alabama (BA, JD)

Military service
- Allegiance: United States
- Branch/service: United States Army; Alabama Army National Guard
- Years of service: 2013–2023
- Rank: Major
- Unit: United States Army Judge Advocate General's Corps
- Awards: See list: Meritorious Service Medal Army Commendation Medal National Defense Service Medal Army Service Ribbon

Liles Clifton Burke (born 1969) is a United States district judge of the United States District Court for the Northern District of Alabama. His official duty station is the United States Courthouse at Huntsville, Alabama. He previously was an Associate Judge of the Alabama Court of Criminal Appeals.

== Early life and education ==
Burke is a native of Arab, Alabama, and was educated in that city's public school system. He received his Bachelor of Arts from the University of Alabama in 1991 and Juris Doctor from the University of Alabama School of Law in 1994.

== Career ==
Upon graduation from law school, he began practicing with his father, Claud Burke, at the law firm of Burke & Beuoy, P.C., where he represented businesses and individuals in general practice, including domestic, criminal, civil litigation, juvenile, and probate matters.

Burke attended the JAG School at the University of Virginia and entered the Judge Advocate General's Corps of the Alabama Army National Guard. He served for more than a decade, achieving the rank of major.

He also served as a Municipal Prosecutor and Municipal Attorney for the City of Arab, and was named as the Municipal Judge for that City in 2001. He held that office until 2006 when he was appointed Marshall County District Judge by Governor of Alabama Bob Riley. In 2008, Burke was elected to a full term on the District Court without opposition. Burke began Marshall County's first family drug court, and along with District Judge Tim Riley, implemented one of Alabama's first domestic violence courts. Additionally, he served as an officer in both the Alabama District Judges Association and the Alabama Juvenile Judges Association.

In 2011, Governor Robert J. Bentley appointed Burke to the Alabama Court of Criminal Appeals, where he served until becoming a United States district judge. He was elected to a six-year term in 2012 without opposition. While on the Court of Criminal Appeals, Burke also served as the president of the Alabama Appellate Judges Association.

Burke has been active over the past many years in several charitable and community organizations, leading the Marshall County United Way fund drive, serving as President of the Arab Chamber of Commerce, and serving on the board of the Marshall County Healthcare Authority. He is Methodist, a Rotarian, and an alumnus of Leadership Alabama.

=== Federal judicial service ===
On July 13, 2017, President Donald Trump announced his intent to nominate Burke to serve as a United States district judge of the United States District Court for the Northern District of Alabama. On July 19, 2017, his nomination was sent to the Senate. He was nominated to the seat vacated by Charles Lynwood Smith Jr., who assumed senior status on August 31, 2013. On October 4, 2017, a hearing on his nomination was held before the Senate Judiciary Committee. On October 26, 2017, his nomination was reported out of committee by an 11–10 vote.

On January 3, 2018, his nomination was returned to the president under Rule XXXI, Paragraph 6 of the United States Senate. On January 5, 2018, President Donald Trump announced his intent to renominate Burke to a federal judgeship. On January 8, 2018, his renomination was sent to the Senate. On January 18, 2018, his nomination was reported out of committee by an 11–10 vote. On October 11, 2018, the Senate confirmed his nomination by a 55–40 vote. He received his judicial commission on October 17, 2018.

=== Prominent cases ===
In May 2022, Burke issued a preliminary injunction blocking enforcement of an Alabama law which criminalized transgender minors from using hormone therapy and puberty blockers. He concluded that the law had a substantial likelihood of being unconstitutional because it interfered with parents' fundamental rights to direct the medical care of their children and constituted unlawful sex discrimination. The case, Eknes-Tucker v. Marshall, was later dismissed by the Plaintiffs in 2025.

In February 2025, Burke publicly reprimanded two of the plaintiff's attorneys in that case for "judge-shopping" by dropping their original case and refiling in a different district court. He reprimanded a third attorney for testifying falsely and referred his conduct to the United States Attorney for investigation.

== Personal life ==
Burke is married to the former Natalie Jones of Jasper, Alabama; they have two children. Natalie Burke was the mayor of Cherokee Ridge, Alabama, from 2020 to 2025.

Legal offices
Preceded by Alisa Kelli Wise	Judge of the Alabama Court of Criminal Appeals; 2011–2018	Succeeded by Chris McCool
Preceded by Charles Lynwood Smith Jr.	Judge of the United States District Court for the Northern District of Alabama; 2018–present	Incumbent
