= Birmingham School of Law =

Private law school in Birmingham, Alabama, US

- Established: 1915
- School type: Private
- Dean: S. Scott Garrett
- Location: Birmingham, Alabama, U.S. 33.51597°N 86.80641°W
- Enrollment: 400
- USNWR ranking: Unranked
- Bar pass rate: 0% (first-time takers); 11% (repeat takers); (July 2025)
- Website: bsol.com

The Birmingham School of Law is an independent law school located in Birmingham, Alabama. Founded in 1915 by Judge Hugh A. Locke, a judge of the Chancery Court and president of the Birmingham Bar Association, the Birmingham School of Law offers a part-time program of study in which graduates receive the Juris Doctor (J.D.) degree after four years of study.

The law school is not accredited by the American Bar Association, and graduates may not qualify to be admitted to the bar in states other than Alabama.

== Admissions ==
The law school requires applicants to have a bachelor's degree before beginning classes but does not require an LSAT test score as part of its application process unless the applicant's degree is from a foreign country. The school reviews an applicants' academic records and employment history in determining acceptance. The school requires a minimum 2.75 GPA to be considered for admission.

== Accreditation ==
Graduates are eligible to take the Alabama Bar Examination pursuant to the authority granted by the Alabama Legislature and the Alabama Supreme Court. The Birmingham School of Law is not accredited by the American Bar Association, nor is the school seeking accreditation. As a result, graduates are generally not allowed to take the bar exam and practice in other states.

== Bar examination passage ==
The Birmingham School of Law ranks significantly below Alabama's three ABA-accredited law schools in bar examination performance. None of the school's alumni who took the Alabama bar exam in July 2025 passed, while 11% of those who took it on a repeat basis passed.

== Facilities ==
The school is located in downtown Birmingham, in a renovated historic building. It consists of an auditorium, mock courtroom, law library, computer lab, and multimedia classrooms. In the past, classes were held at Birmingham-Southern College, the Birmingham YMCA, the historic Frank Nelson Building in downtown Birmingham, and the Jefferson County Courthouse.

== Associations ==
- American Association for Justice
- Christian Legal Society
- Delta Theta Phi
- National Black Law Students Association

== Notable alumni ==
- Clarence W. Allgood (1902–1991) (LL.B. 1941), former United States federal judge
- James D. Martin (1918–2017), attended, former member of the United States House of Representatives for the 7th district of Alabama 1965–1967
- Richard Shelby (b. 1934) (LL.B. 1961), graduate University of Alabama School of Law (LL.B. 1963), former United States senator from Alabama
- Mike D. Rogers (b. 1958) (JD 1991), U.S. representative for Alabama's 3rd congressional district since 2003
- Phil Williams (b. 1965) (JD 2003), former member of the Alabama State Senate 2010–2018
- Alexander Shunnarah (b. 1966) (JD 1995), prominent personal injury lawyer
