= L. Scott Coogler =

American judge (born 1959)

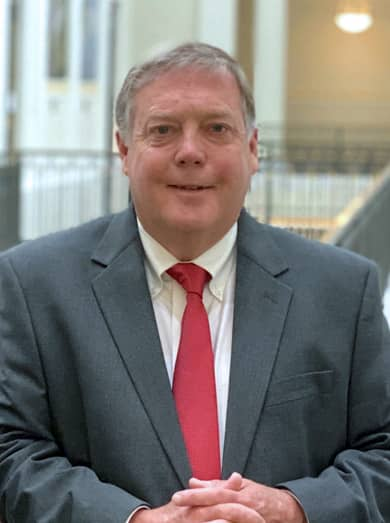
- Coogler in 2020

Chief Judge of the United States District Court for the Northern District of Alabama
- In office January 1, 2020 – December 31, 2023
- Preceded by: Karon O. Bowdre
- Succeeded by: R. David Proctor

Judge of the United States District Court for the Northern District of Alabama
- In office May 28, 2003 – January 2, 2025
- Appointed by: George W. Bush
- Preceded by: H. Dean Buttram Jr.
- Succeeded by: Edmund LaCour

Judge of the Sixth Judicial Circuit Court of Alabama
- In office January 1999 – May 2003

Personal details
- Born: Lawrence Scott Coogler; October 3, 1959 (age 66) Nantucket, Massachusetts, U.S.
- Education: University of Alabama (BA, JD)

Military service
- Branch/service: United States Army; Alabama Army National Guard
- Years of service: 1988–1991 (active); 1991–1997 (inactive)
- Rank: Captain
- Unit: J.A.G. Corps

Lawrence Scott Coogler (born October 3, 1959) is a former United States district judge of the United States District Court for the Northern District of Alabama.

== Early life and education ==
Coogler was born in Nantucket, Massachusetts. He received a Bachelor of Arts degree from the University of Alabama in 1981 and a Juris Doctor from the University of Alabama School of Law in 1984.

== Legal Career ==
From 1982 to 1984, Coogler served as a law clerk to attorney David B. Ellis and later to Judge Paul Conger of the Sixth Judicial Circuit Court of Alabama. He was in private practice in Alabama from 1984 to 1999.

=== Military Service ===
Coogler served in the United States Army National Guard from 1988 to 1991, attaining the rank of Captain in the Judge Advocate General's Corps.

=== State Judgeship ===
He served as a judge on the Sixth Judicial Circuit Court of Alabama from 1996 to 2003, and as an adjunct professor at the University of Alabama School of Law from 2000 to 2003.

== Federal Judgeship ==
On March 27, 2003, Coogler was nominated by President George W. Bush to a seat on the [[United States District Court for the Northern District of Alabama]], vacated by H. Dean Buttram Jr. The American Bar Association unanimously rated him qualified for the nomination. He was confirmed by the United States Senate on May 22, 2003, and his commission was issued on May 28, 2003.

=== Chief Judge ===
Coogler became Chief Judge of the Northern District of Alabama in January 2020, serving until December 31, 2023, when he was succeeded by R. David Proctor. In 2020, he was also elected by the judges of the United States Court of Appeals for the Eleventh Circuit to serve on the Judicial Conference of the United States.

=== Retirement ===
Coogler retired from the federal bench on January 2, 2025, after more than 21 years of service.

== Post-Judicial Career ==
Following his retirement, Coogler joined Federal Arbitration (FedArb) as an arbitrator specializing in federal disputes. He continues to serve as Distinguished Professor of the Practice of Law at the University of Alabama School of Law.

== Education and career ==
Coogler was born in Nantucket, Massachusetts. He received a Bachelor of Arts degree from the University of Alabama in 1981 and a Juris Doctor from the University of Alabama School of Law in 1984. From 1982 to 1984 he was a law clerk to attorney David B. Ellis and later to Judge Paul Conger of the Sixth Judicial Circuit Court of Alabama. He was in private practice in Alabama from 1984 to 1999, also serving in the Army National Guard from 1988 to 1991. He was a judge on the Sixth Judicial Circuit Court of Alabama from 1996 to 2003. He was an adjunct professor at the University of Alabama School of Law, from 2000 to 2003.

=== Federal judicial service ===
On March 27, 2003, Coogler was nominated by President George W. Bush to a seat on the United States District Court for the Northern District of Alabama vacated by H. Dean Buttram Jr. Coogler was confirmed by the United States Senate on May 22, 2003, and received his commission on May 28, 2003. He became Chief Judge on January 1, 2020. and served until December 31, 2023, being succeeded by Judge R. David Proctor. He retired from active service on January 2, 2025.

== Honors ==
Coogler was inducted into the University of Alabama School of Law's Alabama Lawyer Hall of Honor in 2023.

== Sources ==
Legal offices
Preceded by H. Dean Buttram Jr.	Judge of the United States District Court for the Northern District of Alabama; 2003–2025	Succeeded by Edmund LaCour
Preceded by Karon O. Bowdre	Chief Judge of the United States District Court for the Northern District of Alabama; 2020–2023	Succeeded by R. David Proctor
