= Charles Lynwood Smith Jr. =

American judge (born 1943)

Senior Judge of the United States District Court for the Northern District of Alabama
- Incumbent
- Assumed office August 31, 2013

Judge of the United States District Court for the Northern District of Alabama
- In office December 26, 1995 – August 31, 2013
- Appointed by: Bill Clinton
- Preceded by: Elbert Bertram Haltom Jr.
- Succeeded by: Liles C. Burke

Personal details
- Born: February 25, 1943 (age 83) Talladega, Alabama, U.S.
- Education: University of Alabama (BA, JD); Rutgers University (MA)

Charles Lynwood Smith Jr. (born February 25, 1943) is a senior United States district judge of the United States District Court for the Northern District of Alabama.

== Education and career ==
Born in Talladega, Alabama, Smith received a Bachelor of Arts degree from the University of Alabama in 1966, a Master of Arts from Rutgers University in 1967, and a Juris Doctor from the University of Alabama School of Law in 1971. He was a law clerk to Frank H. McFadden of the United States District Court for the Northern District of Alabama from 1971 to 1972, and was thereafter in private practice in Huntsville, Alabama from 1972 to 1981. From 1972 to 1976, he taught political science at the University of Alabama. He was a judge on the Madison County District Court in 1981, and on the 23rd Judicial Circuit Court of Alabama from 1981 to 1995.

== Federal judicial service ==
On December 8, 1995, Smith was nominated by President Bill Clinton to a seat on the United States District Court for the Northern District of Alabama vacated by Elbert Bertram Haltom Jr. Smith was confirmed by the United States Senate on December 22, 1995, and received his commission on December 26, 1995. He took senior status on August 31, 2013.

== Sources ==
Legal offices
Preceded by Elbert Bertram Haltom Jr.	Judge of the United States District Court for the Northern District of Alabama; 1995–2013	Succeeded by Liles C. Burke
