= 1954 United States Senate election in Alabama =

- November 2, 1954
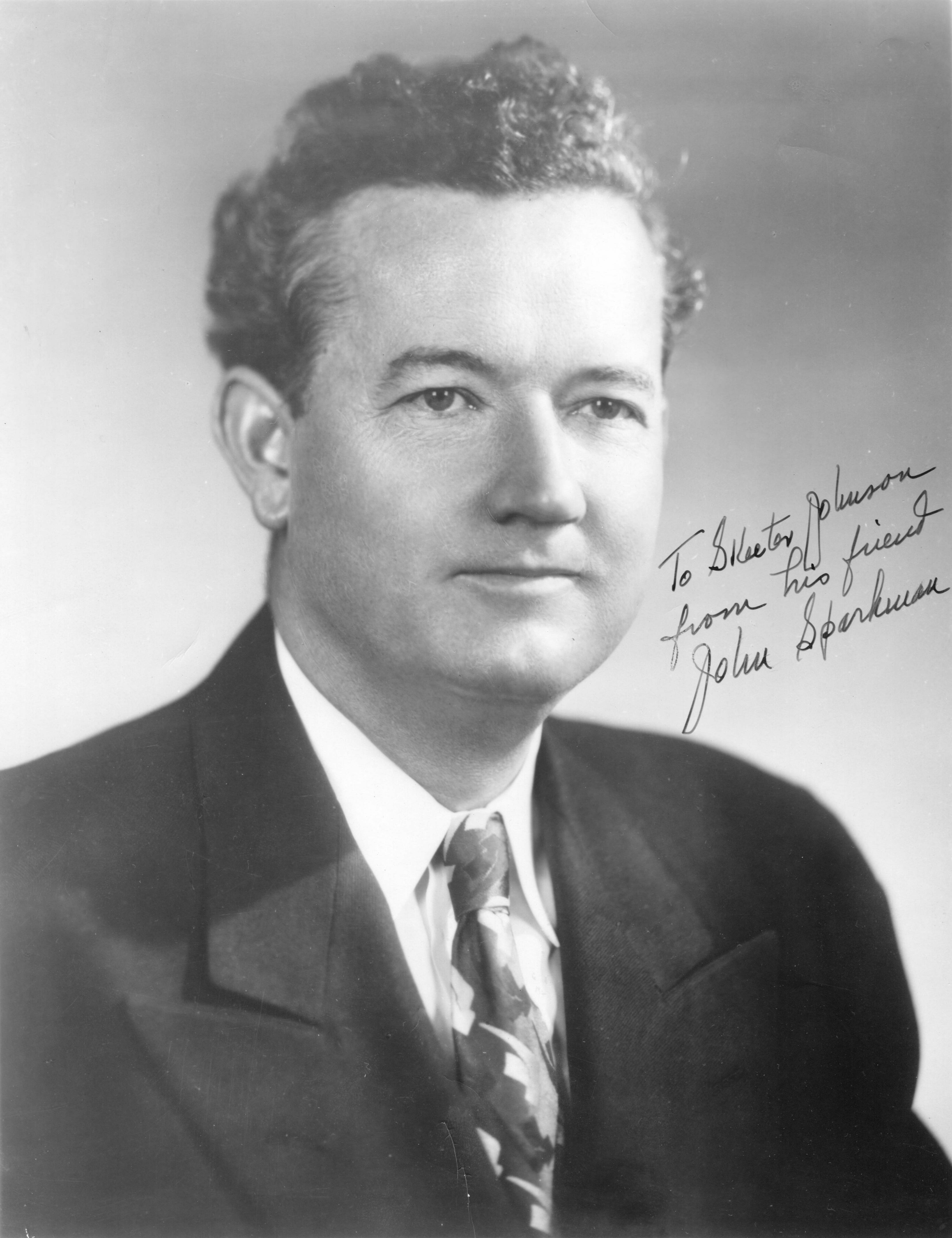

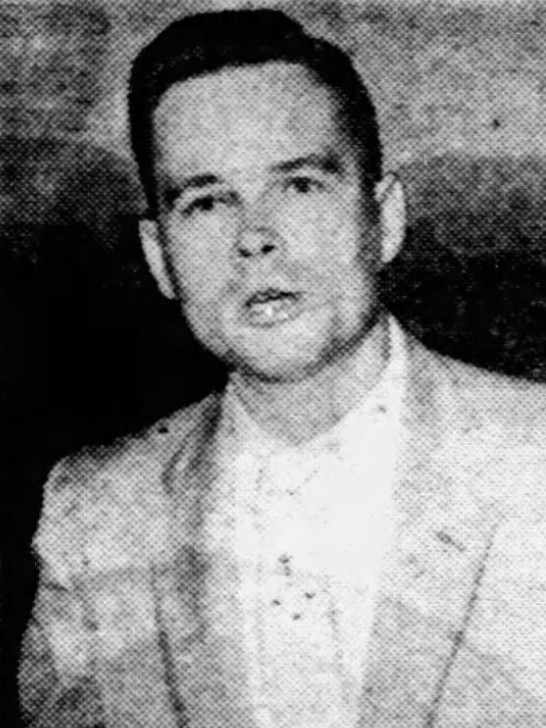
Nominee	John Sparkman	Junius Foy Guin Jr.
Party	Democratic	Republican
Popular vote	259,348	55,110
Percentage	82.48%	17.53%
- County results Sparkman: 50–60% 60–70% 70–80% 80–90% >90%
U.S. senator before election
John Sparkman
Democratic
Elected U.S. Senator
John Sparkman
Democratic

The 1954 United States Senate election in Alabama was held on November 2, 1954.

Incumbent Senator John Sparkman was re-elected to a second full term in office over Republican Junius Foy Guin Jr.

== Democratic primary ==
=== Candidates ===
- Laurie C. Battle, U.S. Representative from Birmingham
- John G. Crommelin, retired U.S. Navy Rear Admiral and white supremacist
- William C. Irby
- John Sparkman, incumbent Senator and 1952 nominee for Vice President

=== Results ===
Democratic primary results by county Sparkman: 30–40%; 40–50%; 50–60%; 60–70%; 70–80%; 80–90%; Battle: 40–50%; 50–60%; 60–70%

1954 Democratic U.S. Senate primary
Party	Candidate	Votes	%
Democratic	John Sparkman (inc.)	323,877	58.26%
Democratic	Laurie C. Battle	208,166	37.44%
Democratic	John G. Crommelin	19,579	3.52%
Democratic	William C. Irby	4,320	0.78%
Total votes		555,942	100.00%

== General election ==
=== Results ===
General election results
Party	Candidate	Votes	%	±%
Democratic	John Sparkman (inc.)	259,348	82.48%	▼1.52
Republican	Junius Foy Guin Jr.	55,110	17.53%	▲1.53
Total votes		314,458	100.00%	

== See also ==
- 1954 United States Senate elections
