= William Acker =

American judge (1927–2018)

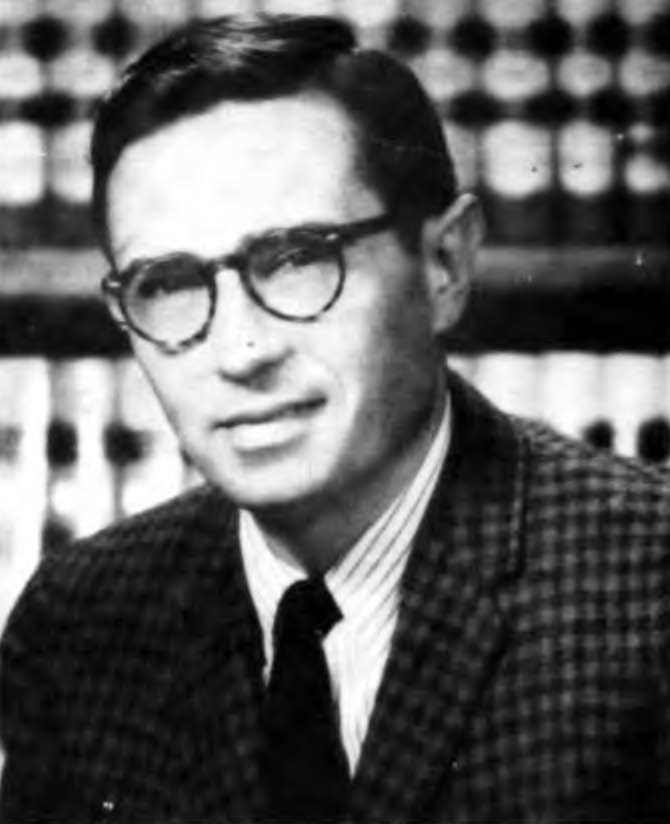
- Acker in 1990

Senior Judge of the United States District Court for the Northern District of Alabama
- In office May 31, 1996 – June 21, 2018

Judge of the United States District Court for the Northern District of Alabama
- In office August 18, 1982 – May 31, 1996
- Appointed by: Ronald Reagan
- Preceded by: Frank Hampton McFadden
- Succeeded by: Seat abolished

Personal details
- Born: William Marsh Acker Jr. October 25, 1927 Birmingham, Alabama, U.S.
- Died: June 21, 2018 (aged 90)
- Education: Birmingham–Southern College (BA); Yale University (LLB)

William Marsh Acker Jr. (October 25, 1927 – June 21, 2018) was a United States district judge of the United States District Court for the Northern District of Alabama.

== Education and career ==
Acker was born in Birmingham, Alabama and served in the United States Army as a private first class from 1946 to 1947. He received a Bachelor of Arts degree from Birmingham–Southern College in 1949 and a Bachelor of Laws from Yale Law School in 1952. He was an attorney in private practice in Birmingham for thirty years, from 1952 to 1982.

== Federal judicial service ==
Acker was nominated by President Ronald Reagan on July 22, 1982, to a seat on the United States District Court for the Northern District of Alabama vacated by Judge Frank Hampton McFadden. He was confirmed by the United States Senate on August 18, 1982, and received his commission the same day. He assumed senior status on May 31, 1996. He took inactive senior status on September 30, 2016, meaning that while he remained a federal judge, he did not hear cases or participate in the business of the court. He remained in that status until his death on June 21, 2018.

== Notable cases ==
In 2007, Acker recommended that the United States Attorney charge Richard Scruggs and the Scruggs Law Firm with criminal contempt for leaking documents in violation of a court order; in 2008, he accused Mississippi Attorney General Jim Hood of conspiring with Scruggs to skirt the court order. In 2008, Acker held the Fair and Accurate Credit Transactions Act unconstitutional in order to impose disproportionate punitive damages ($65,000) on two women defendants who caused no harm (were whistle-blowers exposing insurance fraud), yet Acker did not fine the men found guilty of the insurance fraud. Acker's decision was overturned in 2009.

== Sources ==
Legal offices
Preceded by Frank Hampton McFadden	Judge of the United States District Court for the Northern District of Alabama; 1982–1996	Succeeded by Seat abolished
