= Edwin L. Nelson =

American judge (1940–2003)

Edwin Levon Nelson

Judge of the United States District Court for the Northern District of Alabama
- In office January 24, 1990 – May 17, 2003
- Appointed by: George H. W. Bush
- Preceded by: Junius Foy Guin Jr.
- Succeeded by: Virginia Emerson Hopkins

Magistrate Judge of the United States District Court for the Northern District of Alabama
- In office 1974–1990

Personal details
- Born: Edwin Levon Nelson; February 10, 1940 Brewton, Alabama
- Died: May 17, 2003 (aged 63)
- Education: Cumberland School of Law (LLB)

Edwin Levon Nelson (February 10, 1940 – May 17, 2003) was a United States district judge of the United States District Court for the Northern District of Alabama.

== Education and career ==
Born in Brewton, Alabama, Nelson was in the United States Navy from 1958 to 1962. He received a Bachelor of Laws from Cumberland School of Law at Samford University in 1969, and was in private practice in Fort Payne, Alabama from 1969 to 1974.

=== Federal judicial service ===
Nelson served as a United States magistrate judge for the Northern District of Alabama from 1974 to 1990. On September 13, 1989, he was nominated by President George H. W. Bush to a seat on the United States District Court for the Northern District of Alabama vacated by Junius Foy Guin Jr. Nelson was confirmed by the United States Senate on January 23, 1990, and received his commission on January 24, 1990. Nelson served in that capacity until his death, on May 17, 2003, of bone marrow cancer.

== Sources ==
Legal offices
Preceded by Junius Foy Guin Jr.	Judge of the United States District Court for the Northern District of Alabama; 1990–2003	Succeeded by Virginia Emerson Hopkins
