= U. W. Clemon =

American judge

Chief Judge of the United States District Court for the Northern District of Alabama
- In office 1999–2006
- Preceded by: Sam C. Pointer Jr.
- Succeeded by: Sharon Lovelace Blackburn

Judge of the United States District Court for the Northern District of Alabama
- In office June 30, 1980 – January 31, 2009
- Appointed by: Jimmy Carter
- Preceded by: Seat established by 92 Stat. 1629
- Succeeded by: Abdul Kallon

Member of the Alabama Senate from the 15th district
- In office November 6, 1974 – June 30, 1980
- Succeeded by: Earl Hilliard Sr.

Personal details
- Born: Uriah W. Clemon; April 9, 1943 (age 83) Fairfield, Alabama, U.S.
- Party: Democratic
- Education: Miles College (BA); Columbia University (JD)

Uriah W. Clemon (born April 9, 1943) is an Alabama attorney in private practice and a former United States district judge of the United States District Court for the Northern District of Alabama. He was among the first ten African-American lawyers admitted to the Alabama bar. In 1974 he was one of the first two African Americans elected to the Alabama Senate since Reconstruction.

== Education and career ==
Born in Fairfield, Alabama, to sharecropper parents, Clemon received a Bachelor of Arts degree from the historically black Miles College in 1965. Unable to attend the still segregated University of Alabama, he received a payment from the State of Alabama to attend Columbia University in New York. He received a Juris Doctor from Columbia Law School in 1968. He worked in the New York office of the NAACP Legal Defense Fund from 1968 to 1969 and was in private practice of law in Birmingham, Alabama from 1969 to 1980. He was a member of the Alabama Senate from 1975 to 1980 as a Democrat.

=== Notable service ===
Clemon practiced civil rights law for twelve years. For example, he handled school desegregation cases throughout North Alabama. In Singleton vs. Jackson School District, a Federal Appeals Court approved, for the first time, a desegregation order that set out numeric ratios for black and white children in schools and required school officials to regularly report to the court their progress toward integration. That case set a precedent and standard for school desegregation cases nationally.

In 1969, Clemon sued coach Paul "Bear" Bryant in order to desegregate the University of Alabama's football team. He brought employment discrimination cases against some of the largest employers in Alabama.

In 1974, Clemon was one of the first two black people elected to the Alabama Senate since Reconstruction. As chairman of the Rules Committee and later the Judiciary Committee, he fought against Governor George Wallace's exclusion of black citizens from state boards and agencies. He also fought against reinstatement of the death penalty after the state rewrote its law on capital sentencing. Wallace approved reprieves and postponements for many men on death row, as he disapproved of the death penalty.

== Federal judicial service ==
Clemon was nominated by President Jimmy Carter on January 10, 1980, to the United States District Court for the Northern District of Alabama, to a new seat created by 92 Stat. 1629. Clemon's nomination to the federal judiciary was opposed by Roy Moore, who claimed that Clemon was "soft on crime". However, in 1984, Moore told Clemon "he was sorry that he had done it, it was wrong and he had heard good things about [Clemon]." Then he asked him to share client referrals. He was confirmed by the United States Senate on June 26, 1980, and received his commission on June 30, 1980. The appointment made him Alabama's first Black federal judge. He served as Chief Judge from 1999 to 2006. His service was terminated on January 31, 2009, due to his retirement.

=== Notable cases ===
Clemon was the trial judge in the Ledbetter v. Goodyear case and in several multi-district cases.

== Post judicial service ==
Following his retirement from the federal bench, Clemon retired to the private practice of law in Birmingham and remains active as of June 2018. He continues to fight segregation in public schools. In 2018, he successfully litigated with the NAACP Legal Defense Fund to stop the racially discriminatory plan of the Gardendale, Alabama to create a new, mostly white school system by seceding from the Jefferson County school system .

In February 2022, Clemon wrote to president Joe Biden urging him not to appoint Judge Ketanji Brown Jackson to the United States Supreme Court.

== See also ==
- List of African-American federal judges
- List of African-American jurists
- List of first minority male lawyers and judges in Alabama

== Sources ==
Legal offices
Preceded by Seat established by 92 Stat. 1629	Judge of the United States District Court for the Northern District of Alabama; 1980–2009	Succeeded by Abdul Kallon
Preceded by Sam C. Pointer Jr.	Chief Judge of the United States District Court for the Northern District of Alabama; 1999–2006	Succeeded by Sharon Lovelace Blackburn
