= Harlan Hobart Grooms =

American judge

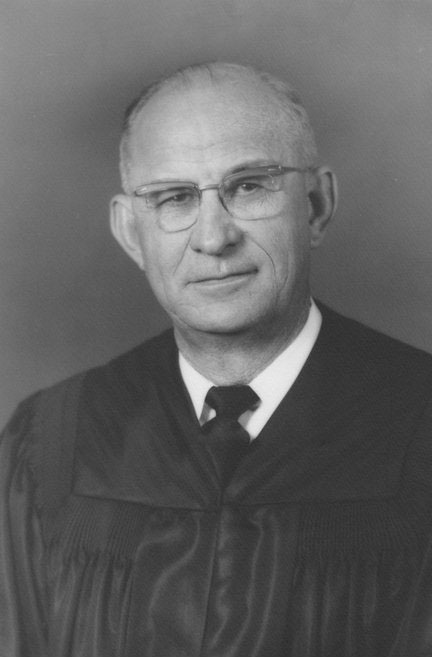

Senior Judge of the United States District Court for the Northern District of Alabama
- In office February 3, 1969 – August 23, 1991

Judge of the United States District Court for the Northern District of Alabama
- In office August 3, 1953 – February 3, 1969
- Appointed by: Dwight D. Eisenhower
- Preceded by: Clarence H. Mullins
- Succeeded by: Frank Hampton McFadden

Personal details
- Born: Harlan Hobart Grooms; November 7, 1900 Montgomery County, Kentucky
- Died: August 23, 1991 (aged 90)
- Education: University of Kentucky College of Law (LL.B.)

Harlan Hobart Grooms (November 7, 1900 – August 23, 1991) was a United States district judge of the United States District Court for the Northern District of Alabama. Grooms was an integral figure in the desegregation of the University of Alabama, having legally granted Vivian Malone Jones and James Hood the right to attend the university.

In a 1963 case filed by the NAACP Legal Defense and Educational Fund of Alabama, Grooms ruled that the college's practice of denying black students admission into their university was a violation of the U.S. Supreme Court's ruling in the Brown v. Board of Education case, in which the act of educating black children in schools intentionally separated from white students was charged as unconstitutional. Judge Grooms also forbid Governor George Wallace from interfering with the students' registration. Wallace ignored the ruling, leading to the Stand in the Schoolhouse Door.

== Education and career ==
Born in Montgomery County, Kentucky, Grooms received a Bachelor of Laws from the University of Kentucky College of Law in 1926, and was in private practice in Birmingham, Alabama from 1926 to 1953. He was in the United States Army Reserve from 1926 to 1939, where he served in the 87th Infantry Division and rose to the rank of 1st Lieutenant.

== Federal judicial service ==
On July 23, 1953, Grooms was nominated by President Dwight D. Eisenhower to a seat on the United States District Court for the Northern District of Alabama vacated by Judge Clarence H. Mullins. Grooms was confirmed by the United States Senate on July 31, 1953, and received his commission on August 3, 1953. He assumed senior status on February 3, 1969, serving in that capacity until his death on August 23, 1991.

=== Notable case ===
On July 1, 1955, Judge Grooms entered an order in the case of Lucy v. Adams, D.C., 134 F. Supp. 235 (N.D. Ala. 1955), permanently enjoining the Dean of Admissions of the University of Alabama from denying African-American students "the right to enroll therein and pursue courses of study thereat solely on account of their race or color." Id. at 239.

== Sources ==
Legal offices
Preceded by Clarence H. Mullins	Judge of the United States District Court for the Northern District of Alabama; 1953–1969	Succeeded by Frank Hampton McFadden
