= Madeline Haikala =

American judge (born 1964)

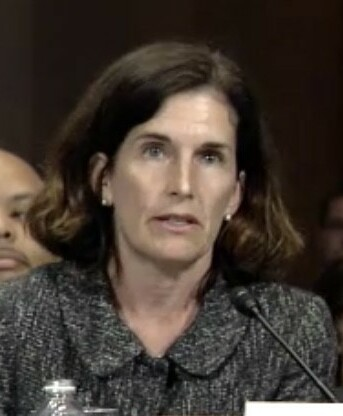
- Haikala in 2013

Chief Judge of the United States District Court for the Northern District of Alabama
- Incumbent
- Assumed office January 1, 2026
- Preceded by: R. David Proctor

Judge of the United States District Court for the Northern District of Alabama
- Incumbent
- Assumed office October 16, 2013
- Appointed by: Barack Obama
- Preceded by: Inge Prytz Johnson

Personal details
- Born: Madeline Clair Hughes; 1964 (age 61–62) New Orleans, Louisiana, U.S.
- Education: Williams College (BA); Tulane University (JD)

Madeline Clair Hughes Haikala (born 1964) is the chief United States district judge of the United States District Court for the Northern District of Alabama.

== Biography ==
Haikala was born Madeline Clair Hughes in 1964, in New Orleans, Louisiana. She received her Bachelor of Arts degree in 1986 from Williams College. She received her Juris Doctor in 1989 from Tulane University Law School, graduating Order of the Coif. She worked in private practice from 1989 until 2011, serving at the law firm of Lightfoot, Franklin & White LLC in Birmingham, Alabama, handling a broad range of commercial litigation at the trial and appellate levels, before state and federal courts. From 1998 to 2005, she taught Appellate Law at Cumberland School of Law as an adjunct professor. She served as a United States magistrate judge in the Northern District of Alabama from 2012 to 2013.

=== Federal judicial service ===
On May 9, 2013, President Barack Obama nominated Haikala to serve as a United States District Judge of the United States District Court for the Northern District of Alabama, to the seat vacated by Judge Inge Prytz Johnson, who assumed senior status on October 24, 2012. She received a hearing before the Senate Judiciary Committee on June 19, 2013, and her nomination was reported to the floor of the Senate on July 18, 2013, by a voice vote. The Senate confirmed her nomination on October 14, 2013, by a 90–0 vote. She received her commission on October 16, 2013. She became chief judge of the court in 2026.

Legal offices
Preceded by Inge Prytz Johnson	Judge of the United States District Court for the Northern District of Alabama; 2013–present	Incumbent
Preceded by R. David Proctor	Chief Judge of the United States District Court for the Northern District of Alabama; 2026–present	Incumbent
