= Clarence W. Allgood =

American judge (1902–1991)

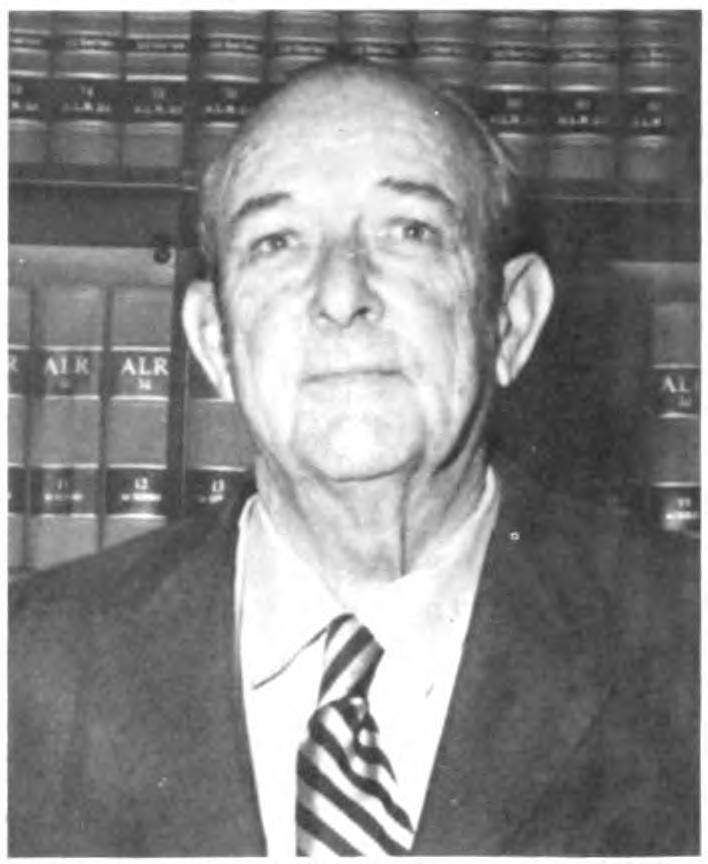

Senior Judge of the United States District Court for the Northern District of Alabama
- In office January 9, 1973 – November 30, 1991

Judge of the United States District Court for the Northern District of Alabama
- In office October 5, 1961 – January 9, 1973
- Appointed by: John F. Kennedy
- Preceded by: Seat established by 75 Stat. 80
- Succeeded by: Junius Foy Guin Jr.

Personal details
- Born: Clarence William Allgood; September 12, 1902 Birmingham, Alabama, U.S.
- Died: November 30, 1991 (aged 89) Birmingham, Alabama, U.S.
- Education: Alabama Polytechnic Institute (BS); Birmingham School of Law (LLB)

Clarence William Allgood (September 12, 1902 – November 30, 1991) was a United States district judge of the United States District Court for the Northern District of Alabama.

== Education and career ==
Born in Birmingham, Alabama, Allgood received a Bachelor of Science degree from Alabama Polytechnic Institute (now Auburn University) in 1926 and a Bachelor of Laws from Birmingham School of Law in 1941. He was a Referee in Bankruptcy for the United States District Court for the Northern District of Alabama from 1937 to 1961.

== Federal judicial service ==
On October 5, 1961, Allgood received a recess appointment from President John F. Kennedy to a new seat on the United States District Court for the Northern District of Alabama created by 75 Stat. 80. Formally nominated to the same seat by President Kennedy on January 15, 1962, he was confirmed by the United States Senate on February 5, 1962, and received his commission on February 9, 1962. He assumed senior status on January 9, 1973, serving in that capacity until his death on November 30, 1991, in Birmingham.

== See also ==
- List of Auburn University people

== Sources ==
Legal offices
Preceded by Seat established by 75 Stat. 80	Judge of the United States District Court for the Northern District of Alabama; 1962–1973	Succeeded by Junius Foy Guin Jr.
