= Sam C. Pointer Jr. =

American judge

Senior Judge of the United States District Court for the Northern District of Alabama
- In office November 19, 1999 – April 3, 2000

Chief Judge of the United States District Court for the Northern District of Alabama
- In office 1982–1999
- Preceded by: Frank Hampton McFadden
- Succeeded by: U. W. Clemon

Judge of the United States District Court for the Northern District of Alabama
- In office October 14, 1970 – November 19, 1999
- Appointed by: Richard Nixon
- Preceded by: Seat established by 84 Stat. 294
- Succeeded by: Karon O. Bowdre

Personal details
- Born: Sam Clyde Pointer Jr. November 15, 1934 Birmingham, Alabama
- Died: March 15, 2008 (aged 73)
- Education: Vanderbilt University (A.B.); University of Alabama School of Law (J.D.); New York University School of Law (LL.M.)

Sam Clyde Pointer Jr. (November 15, 1934 – March 15, 2008) was an attorney in Birmingham, Alabama, and a United States district judge of the United States District Court for the Northern District of Alabama from 1970 to 2000. He was a noted figure in complex multidistrict class-action litigation.

== Early life, education, and career ==
He was born in Birmingham, Alabama, and graduated from Ramsay High School in 1952. He received an Artium Baccalaureus degree from Vanderbilt University in 1955, and a Juris Doctor from the University of Alabama School of Law in 1957, finishing first in his class. He was admitted to the Alabama State Bar in 1957, and went on to receive a Master of Laws in tax law from New York University School of Law in 1958. He was in the United States Army Reserve in the summer of 1957 until 1970, where he served in the 87th Maneuver Area Command and rose to the rank of major. He was in private practice in Birmingham from 1958 to 1970, working for his father, Sam C. Pointer Sr.

== Federal judicial service ==
Pointer was nominated by President Richard Nixon on September 22, 1970, to the United States District Court for the Northern District of Alabama, to a new seat authorized by 84 Stat. 294. He was confirmed by the United States Senate on October 8, 1970, and received his commission on October 14, 1970. He served as Chief Judge from 1982 to 1999. He assumed senior status on November 19, 1999. His service terminated on April 3, 2000, due to his retirement.

Following the failure of the Robert Bork nomination, President Reagan's Justice Department officials showed some interest in naming Pointer to the Supreme Court seat formerly held by Lewis F. Powell Jr. Judge Pointer reached Arthur B. Culvahouse Jr.'s second list of eight candidates in early October, but Edwin Meese and William Bradford Reynolds omitted Pointer from the final list of three candidates at the end of the month.

== Notable cases ==
While on the bench, Pointer ruled that Jefferson County Schools should bus students to achieve racial integration in the 1970s, for which he received numerous death threats. He also issued orders regarding conditions and hiring policies at Birmingham's and Jefferson County's jails. He upheld the City of Birmingham's Affirmative Action hiring plan in 1981 and again in 1992, saying that:

while the failure of Fort McLennan to achieve its affirmative actions goals was not a matter in which to take pride, it was not a violation of civil rights laws

He also made significant rulings in litigation against the manufacturers of silicone gel breast implants, a national case involving as many as twenty-six thousand lawsuits assigned to him by the Judicial Panel on Multidistrict Litigation. He was also involved in antitrust litigation against cast iron pipe and plywood manufacturers.

== Other service ==
In addition to his work on the bench, Pointer was principal author of the Manual for Complex Litigation, 2nd edition and served on the Judicial Panel on Multidistrict Litigation. From 1980 to 1987 he served on the Temporary Emergency Court of Appeals and from 1991 to 1993 was Chair of the Advisory Committee on Civil Rules.

== Post-judicial service ==
After retiring, Pointer joined the Birmingham firm of Lightfoot, Franklin & White as a partner. He led the 2007 investigation into alleged academic improprieties surrounding the Hoover High School football team, concluding that athletes were given special treatment. The report led to the resignation of coach Rush Propst.

== Sources ==
- Meier, Barry (September 29, 1995). "A Judge and a Deadline: The Breast Implant Case". The New York Times.
- Walton, Val (March 16, 2008) "Retired Alabama federal judge Sam Pointer Jr., towering legal figure, dies." Birmingham News

Legal offices
Preceded by Seat established by 84 Stat. 294	Judge of the United States District Court for the Northern District of Alabama; 1970–1999	Succeeded by Karon O. Bowdre
Preceded by Frank Hampton McFadden	Chief Judge of the United States District Court for the Northern District of Alabama; 1982–1999	Succeeded by U. W. Clemon
