= Virginia Emerson Hopkins =

American judge (born 1952)

Senior Judge of the United States District Court for the Northern District of Alabama
- Incumbent
- Assumed office June 22, 2018

Judge of the United States District Court for the Northern District of Alabama
- In office June 17, 2004 – June 22, 2018
- Appointed by: George W. Bush
- Preceded by: Edwin L. Nelson
- Succeeded by: Corey L. Maze

Personal details
- Born: May 6, 1952 (age 73) Anniston, Alabama, U.S.
- Education: University of Alabama (BA); University of Virginia (JD)

Virginia Emerson Hopkins (born May 6, 1952) is an inactive senior United States district judge of the United States District Court for the Northern District of Alabama.

== Early life and education ==
Born in Anniston, Alabama, Hopkins graduated from University of Alabama with her Bachelor of Arts degree in 1974 and later from University of Virginia School of Law with a Juris Doctor in 1977.

== Career ==
Following law school graduation, Hopkins was in private practice in Birmingham, Alabama, from 1977 to 1978. She was in private practice in Washington, D.C. from 1978 to 1991. She was in private practice in Anniston, Alabama from 1991 to 2004.

=== Federal judicial service ===
On the recommendation of Senators Richard Shelby and Jeff Sessions, Hopkins was nominated to the United States District Court for the Northern District of Alabama by President George W. Bush on October 14, 2003, to a seat vacated due to the death of Edwin L. Nelson. Hopkins was confirmed by the Senate on June 15, 2004, and received her commission on June 17, 2004. She assumed senior status on June 22, 2018. She took inactive senior status on September 1, 2019.

== Sources ==
Legal offices
Preceded by Edwin L. Nelson	Judge of the United States District Court for the Northern District of Alabama; 2004–2018	Succeeded by Corey L. Maze
