= Alexander Shunnarah =

American lawyer

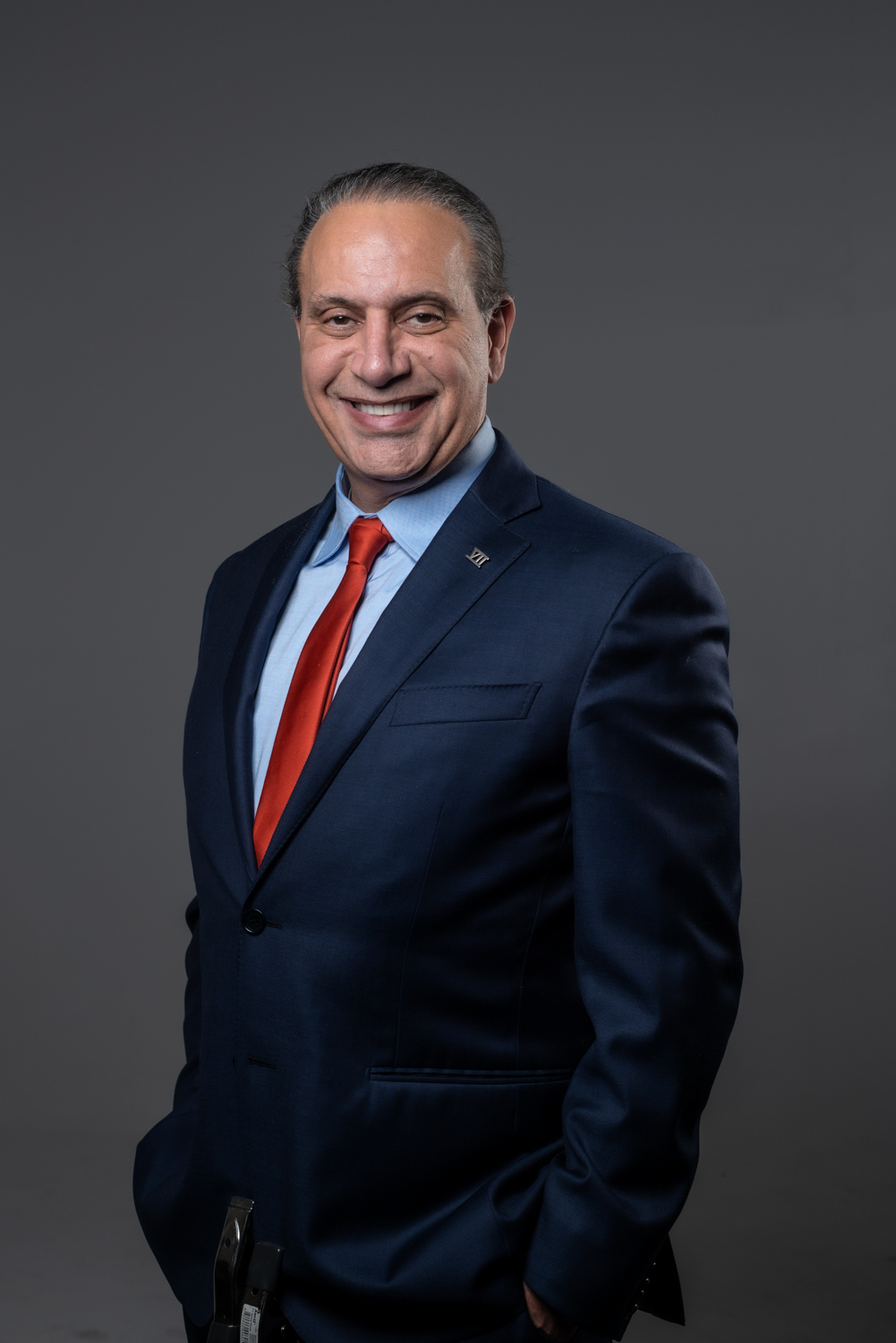
- Shunnarah in 2024
- Born: Alexander Shunnarah; Birmingham, Alabama, U.S.
- Education: University of Alabama at Birmingham (BS),Birmingham School of Law (JD)
- Occupation: Personal injury lawyer
- Years active: 2001–present
- Website: Official website

Alexander Shunnarah is a personal injury lawyer from Alabama, United States. He is the founder, president, and CEO of Alexander Shunnarah Trial Attorneys, which operates in Alabama, Alaska, Arkansas, Florida, Georgia, Illinois, Indiana, Louisiana, Massachusetts, Mississippi, Missouri, New Hampshire, New York, North Carolina, Ohio, South Carolina, Tennessee, Texas and Washington. Shunnarah has built a reputation also for his marketing campaign consisting of television and social media ads and especially billboards, said to be ubiquitous across Alabama. He has gone viral thanks to brainrot memes posted by his official accounts.

== Early life and education ==
Alexander Shunnarah was born in Birmingham, Alabama and attended John Carroll Catholic High School. He attended Samford University but transferred to University of Alabama at Birmingham; he graduated with a B.S. in political science and sociology in 1991. In 1995 he received his Juris Doctor (J.D.) degree from Birmingham School of Law and after working in Birmingham, he established his own law firm in 2001.

== Career ==
Shunnarah's company started with one legal assistant and marketing that consisted of "handing out business cards to family and friends and fellow church members". By 2014 his firm, headquartered in Birmingham, covered North Alabama and in January 2014 had started Alexander Shunnarah & Associates, which covered the Alabama, Florida, and Mississippi coastal areas. In 2016 he opened a new corporate headquarters in Birmingham, employing 60 attorneys.

=== Advertising campaign ===
Shunnarah is well known for the ubiquity of his billboards. He refused to disclose how much he spends on advertising, but did make a video poking fun at his "unparalleled billboard empire across the state and the [southeast]" and has spoken on national conferences about his marketing campaigns. In 2016, he was named "Master of Marketing" by The National Trial Lawyer Magazine. At that time, he and his slogan "Let Me Be Your Attorney" were found "on more than 2,000 billboards and thousands of TV commercials and other ads".

Shunnarah's advertisements have become an internet meme in recent years, which he finds humorous, stating that his team has also started to create their own memes about him on his official accounts.

Shunnarah has stated that his company spends "over $10 million a month on advertising."

=== Alexander Shunnarah Trial Attorneys P.C. ===
Shunnarah opened Alexander Shunnarah Trial Attorneys P.C. in 2001. Over the past 20 years, Alexander Shunnarah Trial Attorneys has grown exponentially, serving over 50,000 clients in over nine states and recovering over $800 million. As of 2025, Alexander Shunnarah Trial Attorneys has offices or lawyers in over 20 states.
