= Clarence H. Mullins =

American judge (1895–1957)

Senior Judge of the United States District Court for the Northern District of Alabama
- In office May 31, 1953 – June 30, 1957

Chief Judge of the United States District Court for the Northern District of Alabama
- In office 1948–1953
- Preceded by: Office established
- Succeeded by: Seybourn Harris Lynne

Judge of the United States District Court for the Northern District of Alabama
- In office April 16, 1943 – May 31, 1953
- Appointed by: Franklin D. Roosevelt
- Preceded by: Seat established by 56 Stat. 1092
- Succeeded by: Harlan Hobart Grooms

Personal details
- Born: Clarence H. Mullins; March 16, 1895 Clanton, Alabama
- Died: June 30, 1957 (aged 62) Mountain Brook, Alabama
- Education: University of Alabama School of Law (LL.B.)

Clarence H. Mullins (March 16, 1895 – June 30, 1957) was an American jurist from the state of Alabama. He served as a United States district judge of the United States District Court for the Northern District of Alabama from 1943 until his death in 1957. He was the Chief Judge of the District court from 1948 until he assumed senior status in 1953 as a result of disability. Mullins was notable for his rulings in the 1940s in favor of desegregation, especially in housing discrimination.

== Education and career ==
Mullins was born in Clanton, Alabama on March 6, 1895. He received a Bachelor of Laws from the University of Alabama School of Law in 1914 and went into private practice in Birmingham, Alabama. He became assistant city attorney of Birmingham and was county attorney of Jefferson County, Alabama until 1943. As an attorney, he once represented New York Yankees player Ben Chapman in his divorce.

== Federal judicial service ==
On March 19, 1943, Mullins was nominated by President Franklin D. Roosevelt to a new seat on the United States District Court for the Northern District of Alabama created by 56 Stat. 1092. He was confirmed by the United States Senate on April 7, 1943, and received his commission on April 16, 1943. In 1948, he was named to the newly created position of Chief Judge for the court.

In 1946, he issued rulings in two cases involving housing discrimination, the first in Birmingham and the second in Tarrant, Alabama. In both cases, Mullins ruled that discrimination in residential zoning was unconstitutional.

In 1947, Samuel Matthews, a Birmingham resident sued the city after he had built a home inside an area that was zoned for blacks. He applied for an occupancy permit, which was denied by the city. Civil rights attorney Arthur Shores argued Matthews v. City of Birmingham before Mullins who ruled that the occupancy permit must be issued to Matthews. This, however, consisted of relief just in the case and did not overturn all of the ordinances. Before he could move in, Samuel Matthews' home was bombed and destroyed.

In 1949, in response to these rulings, Bull Connor, the public safety director of Birmingham, changed the ordinances mandating segregated housing with new codes that made it a misdemeanor for whites to live in black neighborhoods and backs to live in white neighborhoods. Later that year, Mullins struck down the ordinances permanently in Monk v. City of Birmingham. Mary Means Monk, a black resident who had acquired land in a "white area", applied for a building permit to construct a home. She was denied one by the building inspector and enlisted Shores, who was joined by Thurgood Marshall, to file suit. The City hired Horace C. Wilkinson, a member of the Ku Klux Klan, to defend it in court. In December 1949, Mullins ruled that racial zoning laws were unconstitutional and overturned those ordinances. Wilkinson and the city appealed the ruling and, in 1951, the United States Court of Appeals for the Fifth Circuit affirmed Mullins' ruling. Judge Wayne G. Borah wrote the majority opinion, while the dissent was written by Robert Lee Russell, the younger brother of segregationist U.S. Senator Richard Russell Jr. Wilkinson appealed to the Supreme Court, which denied certiorari The rulings set off a wave of bombings of black homes, including those of Samuel Matthews and Mary Monk, during a period when the city acquired the nickname of "Bombingham".

In May 1950, Judge Mullins ruled that the Gulf, Mobile and Ohio Railroad and Brotherhood of Locomotive Firemen and Enginemen, the labor union representing railroad firemen and engineers, could not discriminate against black firemen and had to assign them positions to which they were entitled based on seniority.

On May 31, 1953, Judge Mullins became ill and assumed senior status due to a certified disability. Mullins served in that capacity until his death.

== Personal life and death ==
Mullins died on June 30, 1957, in Mountain Brook, Alabama.

== Sources ==
Legal offices
Preceded by Seat established 56 Stat. 1092	Judge of the United States District Court for the Northern District of Alabama; 1943–1953	Succeeded by Harlan Hobart Grooms
Preceded by Office established	Chief Judge of the United States District Court for the Northern District of Alabama; 1948–1953	Succeeded by Seybourn Harris Lynne
