= James Hughes Hancock =

American judge (1931–2020)

Senior Judge of the United States District Court for the Northern District of Alabama
- In office May 1, 1996 – July 24, 2020

Judge of the United States District Court for the Northern District of Alabama
- In office April 17, 1973 – May 1, 1996
- Appointed by: Richard Nixon
- Preceded by: Seybourn Harris Lynne
- Succeeded by: Inge Prytz Johnson

Personal details
- Born: James Hughes Hancock; April 30, 1931 Montgomery, Alabama, U.S.
- Died: July 24, 2020 (aged 89) Mountain Brook, Alabama, U.S.
- Education: University of Alabama (BS, LLB)

James Hughes Hancock (April 30, 1931 – July 24, 2020) was a United States district judge of the United States District Court for the Northern District of Alabama.

== Education and career ==
Born in Montgomery, Alabama, Hancock received a Bachelor of Science degree from the University of Alabama in 1953 and was a lieutenant in the United States Army from 1953 to 1955. He received his Bachelor of Laws from the University of Alabama School of Law in 1957. He was a law clerk for Justice John L. Goodwyn of Alabama Supreme Court. He was in private practice in Birmingham from 1957 to 1973. He died survived by his wife, Jeanette Kennedy Hancock, and three children: Katherine Hancock Crum; James Hughes Hancock, Jr.; and William Kennedy Hancock.

=== Federal judicial service ===
On March 20, 1973, Hancock was nominated by President Richard Nixon to a seat on the United States District Court for the Northern District of Alabama vacated by Judge Seybourn Harris Lynne. Hancock was confirmed by the United States Senate on April 10, 1973, and received his commission on April 17, 1973. He assumed senior status on May 1, 1996.

== See also ==
- List of United States federal judges by longevity of service

== Sources ==
Legal offices
Preceded by Seybourn Harris Lynne	Judge of the United States District Court for the Northern District of Alabama; 1973–1996	Succeeded by Inge Prytz Johnson
