= Anna M. Manasco =

Alabama judge (born 1980)

Anna Manasco
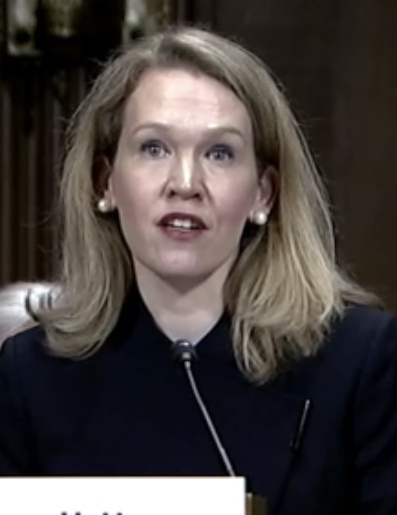

Judge of the United States District Court for the Northern District of Alabama
- Incumbent
- Assumed office May 27, 2020
- Appointed by: Donald Trump
- Preceded by: Karon O. Bowdre

Personal details
- Born: Anna Marie Manasco; 1980 (age 45–46) Montgomery, Alabama, U.S.
- Education: Emory University (BA); St Edmund Hall, Oxford (MSc, DPhil); Yale University (JD)

Anna Marie Manasco (born 1980) is an American lawyer from Alabama who is serving as a United States district judge of the United States District Court for the Northern District of Alabama.

== Education ==
Manasco attended the Saint James School and was the runner-up of the 1998 Tournament of Champions in Lincoln–Douglas debate. Manasco earned her Bachelor of Arts, summa cum laude, from Emory University, her Master of Science and Doctor of Philosophy from The University of Oxford, and her Juris Doctor from Yale Law School, where she served as an executive editor of the Yale Law & Policy Review.

== Career ==
Manasco served as a law clerk to Judge William H. Pryor Jr. of the United States Court of Appeals for the Eleventh Circuit. From 2009 to 2020, she was a partner at Bradley Arant Boult Cummings in Birmingham, Alabama, where her practice focused on trial strategy and appeals in complex commercial litigation. She had represented clients before the Supreme Court of the United States, numerous federal courts of appeals, and the Supreme Court of Alabama.

=== Federal judicial service ===
On December 18, 2019, President Donald Trump announced his intent to nominate Manasco to serve as a United States district judge for the United States District Court for the Northern District of Alabama. On February 4, 2020, her nomination was sent to the Senate. President Trump nominated Manasco to the seat to be vacated by Judge Karon O. Bowdre, who subsequently assumed senior status on April 25, 2020. A hearing on her nomination before the Senate Judiciary Committee was held on February 12, 2020. On March 12, 2020, her nomination was reported out of committee by a 15–6 vote. On May 20, 2020, the United States Senate invoked cloture on her nomination by a 72–20 vote. Her nomination was confirmed later that day by a 71–21 vote. She received her judicial commission on May 27, 2020.

=== Notable rulings ===
Manasco was one of three judges on a special panel that ruled Alabama's proposed maps violated Section 2 of the Voting Rights Act. The three judge panel's ruling was upheld by the U.S. Supreme Court in Allen v. Milligan.

Legal offices
Preceded by Karon O. Bowdre	Judge of the United States District Court for the Northern District of Alabama; 2020–present	Incumbent
