= Corey L. Maze =

American judge (born 1978)

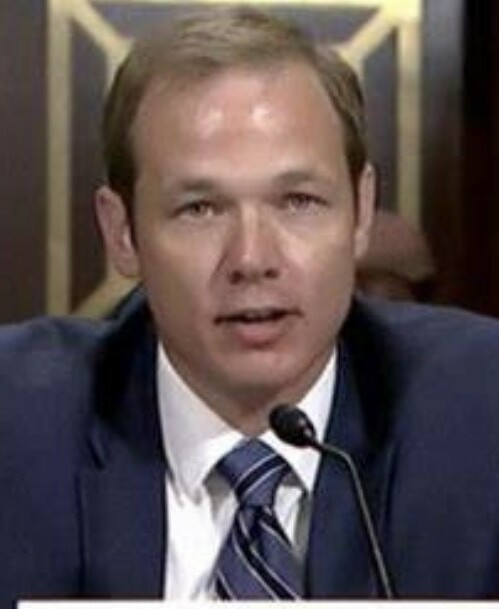

Judge of the United States District Court for the Northern District of Alabama
- Incumbent
- Assumed office June 18, 2019
- Appointed by: Donald Trump
- Preceded by: Virginia Emerson Hopkins

Solicitor General of Alabama
- In office 2008–2011
- Attorney General: Troy King
- Preceded by: Kevin Newsom
- Succeeded by: John Neiman

Personal details
- Born: Corey Landon Maze; 1978 (age 47–48) Gadsden, Alabama, U.S.
- Education: Auburn University (BA); Georgetown University (JD)

Corey Landon Maze (born 1978) is a United States district judge of the United States District Court for the Northern District of Alabama.

== Education ==
Maze earned his Bachelor of Arts, summa cum laude, from Auburn University and his Juris Doctor, cum laude, from the Georgetown University Law Center.

== Career ==
From 2008 to 2011, Maze served as the Solicitor General of Alabama. Before his appointment as Solicitor General, Maze prosecuted criminal trials and appeals for five years as an Assistant Attorney General. During that period, he argued three cases in the Supreme Court of the United States and won three "Best Brief Awards" from the National Association of Attorneys General.

From 2011 to 2019, Maze served as chief of the Attorney General's Special Litigation unit and acted as the state's primary counsel in complex civil matters such as the 2010 oil spill in the Gulf of Mexico and the ongoing opioid crisis.

=== Federal judicial service ===
On May 10, 2018, President Donald Trump nominated Maze to serve as a United States district judge of the United States District Court for the Northern District of Alabama. On May 15, 2018, his nomination was sent to the Senate. He was nominated to the seat vacated by Judge Virginia Emerson Hopkins, who subsequently assumed senior status on June 22, 2018. On October 17, 2018, a hearing on his nomination was held before the Senate Judiciary Committee.

On January 3, 2019, his nomination was returned to the President under Rule XXXI, Paragraph 6 of the United States Senate. On January 23, 2019, President Trump announced his intent to renominate Maze for a federal judgeship. His nomination was sent to the Senate later that day. On February 7, 2019, his nomination was reported out of committee by a 13–9 vote. On June 11, 2019, the Senate invoked cloture on his nomination by a 62–34 vote. On June 12, 2019, his nomination was confirmed by a 62–34 vote. He received his judicial commission on June 18, 2019.

== Memberships ==
He has been a member of the Federalist Society since 2017.

== See also ==
- Crystal Clanton

Legal offices
Preceded by Kevin Newsom	Solicitor General of Alabama; 2008–2011	Succeeded by John Neiman
Preceded by Virginia Emerson Hopkins	Judge of the United States District Court for the Northern District of Alabama; 2019–present	Incumbent
