= William Irwin Grubb =

American judge

Judge of the United States District Court for the Northern District of Alabama
- In office May 18, 1909 – October 27, 1935
- Appointed by: William Howard Taft
- Preceded by: Oscar Richard Hundley
- Succeeded by: David Jackson Davis

Personal details
- Born: William Irwin Grubb; March 8, 1862 Cincinnati, Ohio
- Died: October 27, 1935 (aged 73)
- Education: Yale University (A.B.)

William Irwin Grubb (March 8, 1862 – October 27, 1935) was a United States district judge of the United States District Court for the Northern District of Alabama.

== Education and career ==
Born on March 8, 1862, in Cincinnati, Ohio, Grubb received an Artium Baccalaureus degree in 1883 from Yale University. He entered private practice in Cincinnati starting in 1884. He continued private practice in Birmingham, Alabama until 1909.

== Federal judicial service ==
Grubb was nominated by President William Howard Taft on May 8, 1909, to a seat on the United States District Court for the Northern District of Alabama vacated by Judge Oscar Richard Hundley. Grubb's roommate at Yale had been Horace Taft, the President's youngest brother. He was confirmed by the United States Senate on May 18, 1909, and received his commission the same day. His service terminated on October 27, 1935, due to his death.

=== Notable cases ===
In 1913, 1927, and 1930, Grubb was assigned to the Federal District Court in New York City to help reduce the backlog. He gained a reputation for his decisions against price fixing schemes (for example the Wool Institute case in 1930) and for giving out long jail sentences to bootleggers. He was also a hard taskmaster, insisting for court to begin promptly at 9:30 and to continue after lunch until 5:30.

In 1929, President Herbert Hoover appointed Grubb to the Wickersham Commission in response to the crime wave and lingering questions about the effectiveness of Prohibition. Grubb believed that Prohibition should be given a further trial, but if "proper enforcement and observance are not had, within a reasonable period or if a better system is shown to exist, it will be time enough to abandon Prohibition and to adopt the better substitute." Ironically, Grubb's grandfather was a whiskey distiller.

During the New Deal, Judge Grubb struck down key pieces of Roosevelt's legislation. William E. Bulcher, an Alabama saw mill owner, was indicted by a federal grand jury in August 1934 for violations of the National Recovery Act after earlier agreeing to comply. Lawyers for the NRA decided that the Bulcher case was ideal to test the NRA and knew that Grubb questioned the NRA's constitutionality. In October, Grubb signed the demurrer dismissing the indictment and declared the NRA unconstitutional. Under the Criminal Appeals Act of 1907, that sent the matter directly to the Supreme Court. However, the NRA's lawyers decided that the timing was bad because the NRA required new enabling legislation in June 1935 and dropped the indictment when Bulcher agreed to settle.

In December 1934, Grubb ruled in Ashwander v. Tennessee Valley Authority that the government had no right to engage in the power business except to dispose of a surplus incidental to the exercise of some other constitutional function. While he avoided declaring the Tennessee Valley Authority unconstitutional, he issued an injunction restraining it. Senator George W. Norris, the prime sponsor of the New Deal's power program, declared: "The effect of the injunction is practically to nullify the whole TVA Act."

In July 1935, Grubb's decision was overturned by the 5th Federal Circuit Court in New Orleans. When the case reached the Supreme Court, Chief Justice Charles Evans Hughes wrote that the TVA was constitutional, giving Roosevelt a major victory. In a concurring opinion, Justice Louis Brandeis first elaborated his doctrine of constitutional avoidance: the court should limit its review of constitutional questions to when it is necessary to reach a decision. Brandeis concluded that constitutional review was not necessary in the case because Ashwander had not been injured and so did not have standing to sue.

== Family ==
Grubb was the son of John Grubb and Sidney Irwin. The family was descended from John Grubb, who originally settled in Delaware from Cornwall in the late 1600s. Grubb's parents owned a grocery in Cincinnati, and both were related to President Benjamin Harrison. A local delegation welcoming Harrison was somewhat surprised when he warmly greeted the young lawyer, who responded with "Hello Uncle Ben." In 1906, Grubb married Alice Virgo and had three children.

== Honor and death ==
Grubb was awarded an honorary doctorate in laws by Yale University. He died of a heart attack on October 27, 1935, while he was preparing to leave home for church with his wife.

== Sources ==
Legal offices
Preceded by Oscar Richard Hundley	Judge of the United States District Court for the Northern District of Alabama; 1909–1935	Succeeded by David Jackson Davis
