= H. Dean Buttram Jr. =

American judge (born 1950)

Judge of the United States District Court for the Northern District of Alabama
- In office October 9, 1998 – June 30, 2002
- Appointed by: Bill Clinton
- Preceded by: Robert Bruce Propst
- Succeeded by: L. Scott Coogler

Personal details
- Born: Horace Dean Buttram Jr. November 12, 1950 (age 75) Gadsden, Alabama
- Education: Jacksonville State University (BA, MBA, MPA); Cumberland School of Law (JD)

Horace Dean Buttram Jr., known professionally as H. Dean Buttram Jr., (born November 12, 1950) is a former United States district judge of the United States District Court for the Northern District of Alabama and is an attorney in private practice in Centre, Alabama.

== Education and career ==
Born on November 12, 1950, in Gadsden, Alabama, Buttram received a Bachelor of Arts degree from Jacksonville State University in 1972, a Master of Business Administration and a Master of Public Administration from Jacksonville State University in 1975, and a Juris Doctor from Cumberland School of Law in 1978. He was in private practice in Centre, Alabama from 1978 to 1998.

== Federal judicial service ==
On August 31, 1998, Buttram was nominated by President Bill Clinton to a seat on the United States District Court for the Northern District of Alabama vacated by Robert Bruce Propst. Buttram was confirmed by the United States Senate on October 8, 1998, and received his commission on October 9, 1998. He resigned from the bench on June 30, 2002.

== Post judicial service ==
Since his resignation, Buttram has served as an attorney in private practice at the law firm of Buttram Hawkins Hopper LLC in Centre, Alabama.

== Sources ==
Legal offices
Preceded by Robert Bruce Propst	Judge of the United States District Court for the Northern District of Alabama; 1998–2002	Succeeded by L. Scott Coogler
