= Seybourn Arthur Lynne =

Alabama politician (born 1877)

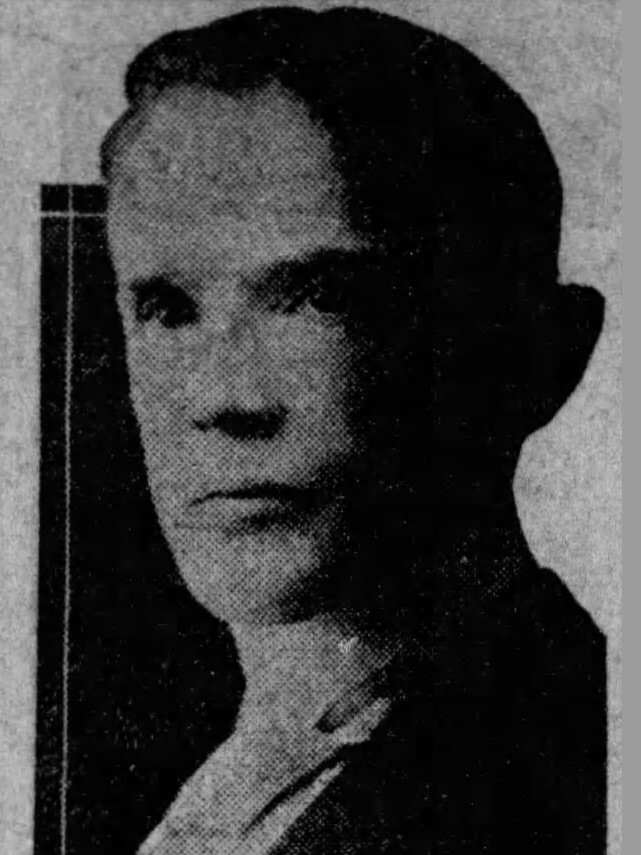

Seybourn Arthur Lynne (July 5, 1877-?) was a lawyer, state legislator, and judge in Alabama. He served in the Alabama Senate and Alabama House of Representatives, including as Speaker of the Alabama House of Representatives. Judge Seybourn H. Lynne was one of his children.

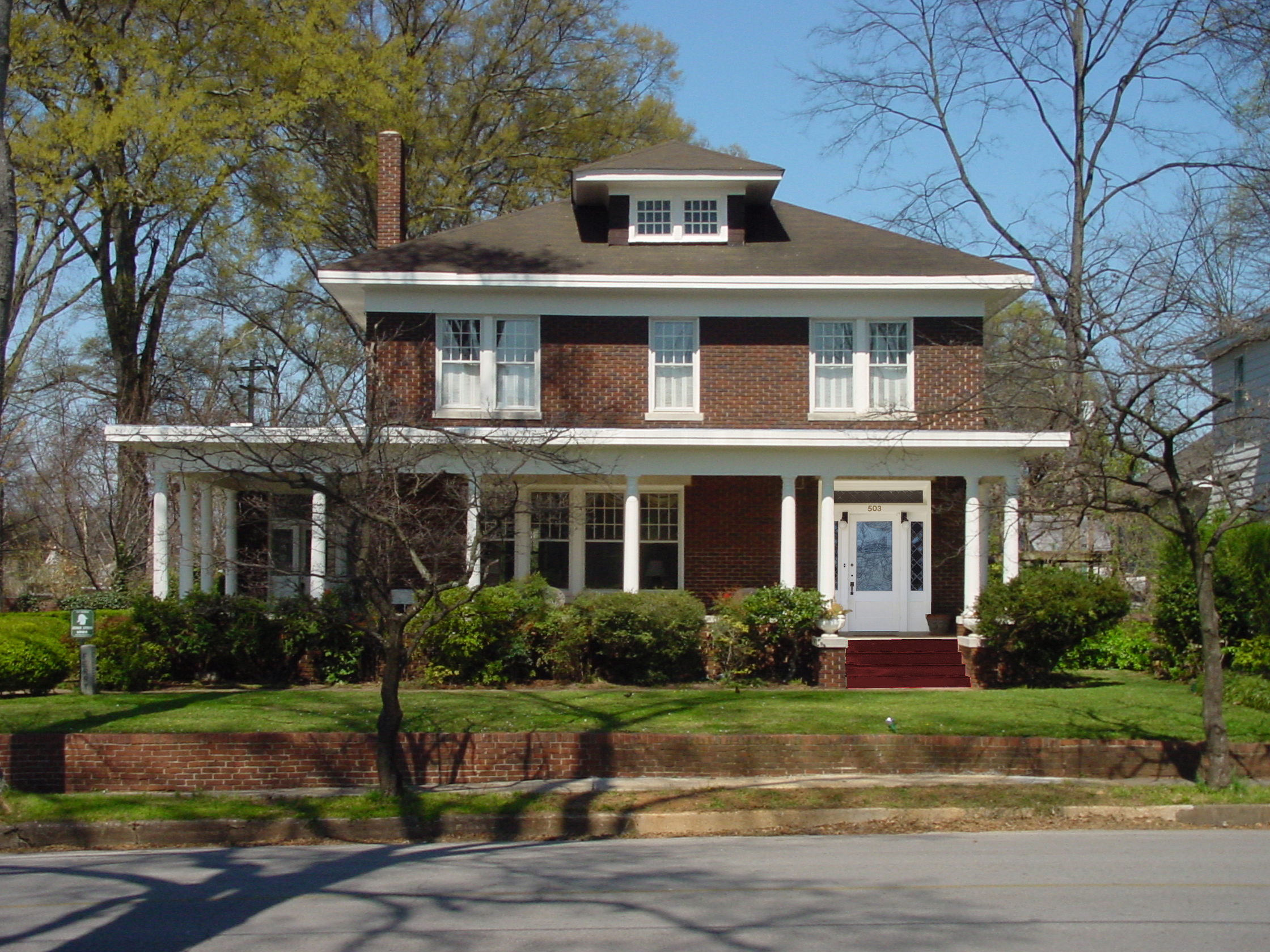
The home he built in Decatur at 503 Ferry Street NE

He was born near Somerville, Alabama. He attended an academy in Somerville and Morgan County College. He taught for a year at a school before studying law at the University of Alabama. He was a Baptist, Odd Fellow, and member of the Junior Order of United American Mechanics.

He married Annie Leigh Harris in 1906. He was a director and lawyer for various companies.
