= Sharon Lovelace Blackburn =

American judge (born 1950)

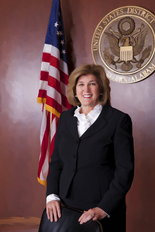

Senior Judge of the United States District Court for the Northern District of Alabama
- Incumbent
- Assumed office May 8, 2015

Chief Judge of the United States District Court for the Northern District of Alabama
- In office 2006–2013
- Preceded by: U. W. Clemon
- Succeeded by: Karon O. Bowdre

Judge of the United States District Court for the Northern District of Alabama
- In office May 30, 1991 – May 8, 2015
- Appointed by: George H. W. Bush
- Preceded by: Seat established by 104 Stat. 5089
- Succeeded by: Annemarie Axon

Personal details
- Born: Sharon Lovelace; May 7, 1950 (age 75) Pensacola, Florida, U.S.
- Education: University of Alabama (BA); Cumberland School of Law (JD)

Sharon Lovelace Blackburn (born May 7, 1950) is a senior United States district judge of the United States District Court for the Northern District of Alabama.

== Education and career ==
Born in Pensacola, Florida, Blackburn received a Bachelor of Arts degree from the University of Alabama in 1973 and a Juris Doctor from Samford University, Cumberland School of Law in 1977. She was a law clerk to the Justice J. O. Sentell of the Alabama Supreme Court in 1977, and to United States District Judge Robert Varner of the Middle District of Alabama, from 1977 to 1978. She was a staff attorney of Birmingham Area Legal Services in Birmingham, Alabama in 1979, and was then an Assistant United States Attorney for the Northern District of Alabama, in the Civil Division from 1979 to 1985, and in the Criminal Division from 1985 to 1991.

== Federal judicial service ==
On April 11, 1991, Blackburn was nominated by President George H. W. Bush to a new seat on the United States District Court for the Northern District of Alabama created by 104 Stat. 5089. She was confirmed by the United States Senate on May 24, 1991, and received her commission on May 30, 1991. She served as Chief Judge from 2006 to 2013. She assumed senior status on May 8, 2015.

== See also ==
- List of first women lawyers and judges in Alabama

== Sources ==
Legal offices
Preceded by Seat established by 104 Stat. 5089	Judge of the United States District Court for the Northern District of Alabama; 1991–2015	Succeeded by Annemarie Axon
Preceded by U. W. Clemon	Chief Judge of the United States District Court for the Northern District of Alabama; 2006–2013	Succeeded by Karon O. Bowdre
