= Frank Hampton McFadden =

American judge (1925–2020)

Chief Judge of the United States District Court for the Northern District of Alabama
- In office 1973–1982
- Preceded by: Seybourn Harris Lynne
- Succeeded by: Sam C. Pointer Jr.

Judge of the United States District Court for the Northern District of Alabama
- In office August 9, 1969 – January 1, 1982
- Appointed by: Richard Nixon
- Preceded by: Harlan Hobart Grooms
- Succeeded by: William Acker

Personal details
- Born: November 20, 1925 Oxford, Mississippi
- Died: December 28, 2020 (aged 95) Birmingham, Alabama
- Education: University of Mississippi (B.A.); Yale Law School (LL.B.)

Frank Hampton McFadden (November 20, 1925 – December 28, 2020) was a United States district judge of the United States District Court for the Northern District of Alabama and later an attorney in private practice.

== Education and career ==
Born on November 20, 1925, in Oxford, Mississippi, McFadden was in the United States Navy from 1944 to 1949 and from 1951 to 1953. He received a Bachelor of Arts degree from the University of Mississippi in 1950 and a Bachelor of Laws from Yale Law School in 1955. He was in private practice in New York City, New York, from 1955 to 1958, and then in Birmingham, Alabama until 1969.

== Federal judicial service ==
On July 22, 1969, McFadden was nominated by President Richard Nixon to a seat on the United States District Court for the Northern District of Alabama vacated by Judge Harlan Hobart Grooms. McFadden was confirmed by the United States Senate on August 8, 1969, and received his commission on August 9, 1969. He served as Chief Judge from 1973 until his resignation on January 1, 1982.

== Post judicial service ==
Following his resignation from the federal bench, McFadden became an executive with Blount, Inc., in Montgomery, Alabama, serving until 1995. In 1995, McFadden joined the Montgomery law firm of Capell and Howard, Inc., serving as Of Counsel at the firm. He specialized in drafting contracts for construction and procurement and alternative dispute resolution.

== Sources ==
- Frank Hampton McFadden's obituary

Legal offices
Preceded by Harlan Hobart Grooms	Judge of the United States District Court for the Northern District of Alabama; 1969–1982	Succeeded by William Acker
Preceded by Seybourn Harris Lynne	Chief Judge of the United States District Court for the Northern District of Alabama; 1973–1982	Succeeded by Sam C. Pointer Jr.
