= Junius Foy Guin Jr. =

American judge

Senior Judge of the United States District Court for the Northern District of Alabama
- In office February 3, 1989 – November 8, 2016

Judge of the United States District Court for the Northern District of Alabama
- In office April 18, 1973 – February 3, 1989
- Appointed by: Richard Nixon
- Preceded by: Clarence W. Allgood
- Succeeded by: Edwin L. Nelson

Personal details
- Born: Junius Foy Guin Jr. February 2, 1924 Russellville, Alabama
- Died: November 8, 2016 (aged 92)
- Education: University of Alabama (A.B.); University of Alabama School of Law (J.D.)

Junius Foy Guin Jr. (February 2, 1924 – November 8, 2016) was a United States district judge of the United States District Court for the Northern District of Alabama.

== Education and career ==
Born in Russellville, Alabama, Guin was an infantry officer in the United States Army during World War II; he served from 1943 to 1946, and achieved the rank of Lieutenant. He received a Juris Doctor from the University of Alabama School of Law in 1947, and was in private practice in Russellville from 1948 to 1973. He received an Artium Baccalaureus degree from the University of Alabama in 1975.

== Federal judicial service ==
On March 20, 1973, Guin was nominated by President Richard Nixon to a seat on the United States District Court for the Northern District of Alabama vacated by Judge Clarence W. Allgood. Guin was confirmed by the United States Senate on April 10, 1973, and received his commission on April 18, 1973. He assumed senior status on February 3, 1989, and died at the age of 92 on November 8, 2016.

Legal offices
Preceded by Clarence W. Allgood	Judge of the United States District Court for the Northern District of Alabama; 1973–1989	Succeeded by Edwin L. Nelson
Party political offices
Preceded by Paul G. Parsons	Republican nominee for U.S. Senator from Alabama (Class 2); 1954	Succeeded by Julian E. Elgin
