= Inge Prytz Johnson =

American judge (born 1945)

Senior Judge of the United States District Court for the Northern District of Alabama
- Incumbent
- Assumed office October 24, 2012

Judge of the United States District Court for the Northern District of Alabama
- In office October 9, 1998 – October 24, 2012
- Appointed by: Bill Clinton
- Preceded by: James Hughes Hancock
- Succeeded by: Madeline Haikala

Personal details
- Born: Inge Prytz; December 19, 1945 (age 80) Svendborg, Denmark
- Education: City of London College (Cert.); University of Copenhagen Faculty of Law (C.Juris); University of Alabama (MCLaw, JD)

Inge Prytz Johnson (born December 19, 1945) is an inactive Senior United States district judge of the United States District Court for the Northern District of Alabama.

== Early life and education ==
Born in Svendborg, Denmark, Johnson received a Certificate of English Law from City of London College in 1968 and a Juris Certificate from the University of Copenhagen Faculty of Law in 1969. In 1970, Johnson moved to the United States, and attended the University of Alabama School of Law and graduated with a M.C.Law degree. She received a Juris Doctor from the University of Alabama School of Law in 1973.

== Career ==
Following law school graduation, Johnson started her legal career as a private practice attorney licensed in the nation of Denmark from 1970 to 1971. During this time, Johnson also served as a part-time faculty member for the University of Copenhagen Faculty of Law.

After receiving her license to practice law in the United States, Johnson started her legal career as a private practice attorney in Alabama from 1973 to 1979. In 1978, Johnson held a part-time Municipal judge for the City Court of Muscle Shoals from 1978 to 1979. In 1979, Johnson was elected by the people of Alabama to become a Circuit court judge in the 31st Judicial Circuit Court of Alabama until her appointment to the federal bench in 1999. Johnson was the Chief Judge of the Court from 1980 to 1999.

=== Federal judicial service ===
On the recommendation of U.S. Senator Richard Shelby, Johnson was nominated by President Bill Clinton on August 31, 1998, to a seat vacated by James Hughes Hancock. Johnson was confirmed by the Senate on October 8, 1998, and received commission on October 9, 1998. She assumed senior status on October 24, 2012.

== See also ==
- List of first women lawyers and judges in Alabama

== Sources ==
Legal offices
Preceded by James Hughes Hancock	Judge of the United States District Court for the Northern District of Alabama; 1998–2012	Succeeded by Madeline Hughes Haikala
