= Seybourn Harris Lynne =

American judge (1907–2000)

Senior Judge of the United States District Court for the Northern District of Alabama
- In office January 9, 1973 – September 10, 2000

Chief Judge of the United States District Court for the Northern District of Alabama
- In office 1953–1973
- Preceded by: Clarence H. Mullins
- Succeeded by: Frank Hampton McFadden

Judge of the United States District Court for the Northern District of Alabama
- In office January 3, 1946 – January 9, 1973
- Appointed by: Harry S. Truman
- Preceded by: Thomas Alexander Murphree
- Succeeded by: James Hughes Hancock

Personal details
- Born: Seybourn Harris Lynne; July 25, 1907 Decatur, Alabama
- Died: September 10, 2000 (aged 93) Birmingham, Alabama
- Education: Auburn University (B.S.); University of Alabama School of Law (LL.B.)

Seybourn Harris Lynne (July 25, 1907 – September 10, 2000) was an American jurist. He was United States district judge for the United States District Court for the Northern District of Alabama. He was Chief Judge of the court from 1953 to 1973. At the time of his death, he was the longest-serving judge on the federal bench and the last remaining judge appointed by President Truman. Judge Lynne served from 1946 to 2000, although his final 27 years were in senior status.

== Early life and career ==
Lynne was born in Decatur, Alabama, in 1907. His father, Seybourn Arthur Lynne, was an attorney who served in the Alabama House of Representatives and the Alabama Senate. Lynne received a Bachelor of Science degree from Alabama Polytechnic Institute (now Auburn University) in 1927 where he starred in both football and track. He received his Bachelor of Laws from the University of Alabama School of Law in 1930. He was in private practice in Decatur from 1930 to 1934 with his father Seybourn Arthur Lynne.

In 1934, he was elected as a judge in Morgan County. He was elected a judge for the Eighth Circuit of Alabama in 1940. In 1942, Lynne joined the United States Army, where he served in the Judge Advocate General's Corps during World War II. He served through 1946 and advanced to the rank of lieutenant colonel and was awarded the Bronze Star for Gallant Service.

== Federal judicial service ==
On December 14, 1945, Lynne was nominated by President Harry S. Truman to a seat on the United States District Court for the Northern District of Alabama vacated by Judge Thomas Alexander Murphree. Lynne was confirmed by the United States Senate on December 20, 1945, and received his commission on January 3, 1946. In 1953, he became the Chief Judge of the court.

Lynne was involved in a number of civil rights cases during his service. On June 5, 1956, in the Browder v. Gayle case, the District Court ruled 2–1 that bus segregation is unconstitutional under the Equal Protection Clause of the 14th Amendment to the U.S. Constitution. Lynne wrote the dissenting opinion in the case. In this case, Lynne's dissent was based on his belief that Brown v. Board of Education desegregated only educational facilities; but for other public services Plessy v. Ferguson remained in effect. This was the first case that extended desegregation to additional facilities, effectively overruling the Supreme Court in Plessy.

In 1957, in the Baldwin v Morgan case, Judge Lynne refused to order the desegregation of waiting rooms at Birmingham Terminal Station after two black residents were arrested for using the whites-only facilities. The plaintiffs' attorney, Oscar Adams, sought a summary judgment to desegregate the waiting rooms. His view was that no law compelled the passengers to observe the signs and, so while their arrest was improper, there was no further action to be taken as this was not legally segregated. His ruling was overturned by the United States Court of Appeals for the Fifth Circuit on appeal in 1961.

Lynne heard two cases on school desegregation in Birmingham, Shuttlesworth v. Birmingham Board of Education in 1958 and Armstrong v. Birmingham Board of Education in 1963. In both cases, Birmingham schools officially did not discriminate on school admissions based on race, but implemented an achievement test that resulted in black students being denied admission to all-white schools. Lynne denied the plaintiff's request to overturn the school admission standards because the plaintiffs had not exhausted all of their remedies. After the case was appealed, the Fifth Circuit overruled Lynne and ordered him to issue a ruling to desegregate the schools. As an added complication, Lynne, as the Chief Judge, imposed a procedural rule that out-of-state attorneys had to associate with a local law firm in order to argue a case in the court. In one case, a local attorney was pressured to sever his ties with the black lawyers, depriving them of an opportunity to have cases heard in Lynne's Court.

In June 1963, he ordered Governor George Wallace, who had promised to block the entrance doors of the University of Alabama to prevent black students from registering, to allow Vivian Malone Jones and James Hood to enter the university, ending segregation at that institution. Lynne's ruling emphasized that law and order had to be maintained and that Wallace could not prevent enforcement of the laws.

His views on civil rights did change slightly over time. In Washington v. Lee of 1966, his court overturned racial segregation in prisons, requiring integration of all facilities. His ruling was upheld by the Supreme Court in 1968.

In 1973, Judge Lynne took on senior status and continued to hear cases until 2000. In 1995, the federal courthouse in Decatur, Alabama, was renamed in his honor.

== Personal life and death ==
Lynne was married to Katherine Lynne and had one child, Bobbie. Lynne died on September 10, 2000, in Birmingham.

== See also ==
- List of United States federal judges by longevity of service

Legal offices
Preceded by Thomas Alexander Murphree	Judge of the United States District Court for the Northern District of Alabama; 1946–1973	Succeeded by James Hughes Hancock
Preceded by Clarence H. Mullins	Chief Judge of the United States District Court for the Northern District of Alabama; 1953–1973	Succeeded by Frank Hampton McFadden
