= R. David Proctor =

American judge (born 1960)

David Proctor

Senior Judge of the United States District Court for the Northern District of Alabama
- In office January 1, 2026 – July 1, 2026

Chief Judge of the United States District Court for the Northern District of Alabama
- In office January 1, 2024 – January 1, 2026
- Preceded by: L. Scott Coogler
- Succeeded by: Madeline Haikala

Judge of the United States District Court for the Northern District of Alabama
- In office September 22, 2003 – January 1, 2026
- Appointed by: George W. Bush
- Preceded by: Seat established
- Succeeded by: Greg Cook

Personal details
- Born: Robert David Proctor; December 5, 1960 (age 65) Atlanta, Georgia, U.S.
- Education: Carson-Newman University (BA); University of Tennessee (JD)

Robert David Proctor (born 1960) is a former United States district judge of the United States District Court for the Northern District of Alabama.

== Education and career ==
Born in Atlanta, Georgia, Proctor received a Bachelor of Arts degree from Carson–Newman College, (now Carson–Newman University), in 1983 and a Juris Doctor from the University of Tennessee College of Law in 1986. He was a law clerk to Hiram Emory Widener Jr. of the United States Court of Appeals for the Fourth Circuit from 1986 to 1987. He was in private practice in Birmingham, Alabama, from 1987 to 2003.

== Federal judicial service ==
On May 1, 2003, Proctor was nominated by President George W. Bush to a new seat on the United States District Court for the Northern District of Alabama created by 116 Stat. 1758. He was confirmed by the United States Senate on September 17, 2003, and received his commission on September 22, 2003. He became chief judge on January 1, 2024. He assumed senior status on January 1, 2026, and retired on July 1, 2026.

== Sources ==
Legal offices
New seat	Judge of the United States District Court for the Northern District of Alabama; 2003–2026	Succeeded by Greg Cook
Preceded by L. Scott Coogler	Chief Judge of the United States District Court for the Northern District of Alabama; 2024–2026	Succeeded by Madeline Haikala
