= United States District Court for the Northern District of Alabama =

Federal court of the 11th circuit

Coordinates: 33°30′58.7″N 86°48′40.2″W

- (N.D. Ala.)
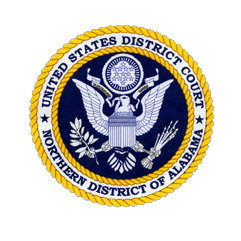

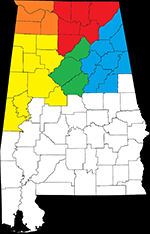
- Location: Birmingham More locations: United States Courthouse (Huntsville); Tuscaloosa; Florence; Anniston
- Appeals to: Eleventh Circuit
- Established: March 10, 1824
- Judges: 8
- Chief Judge: Madeline Haikala

Officers of the court
- U.S. Attorney: Phil Williams
- U.S. Marshal: Chester Martin Keely
- www.alnd.uscourts.gov

The United States District Court for the Northern District of Alabama (in case citations, N.D. Ala.) is a federal court in the Eleventh Circuit (except for patent claims and claims against the U.S. government under the Tucker Act, which are appealed to the Federal Circuit).

The District was established on March 10, 1824, with the division of the state into a Northern and Southern district. The circuit court itself was established on June 22, 1874.

The United States Attorney's Office for the Northern District of Alabama represents the United States in civil and criminal litigation in the court. As of May 28, 2026, the United States attorney is Phil Williams.

== Organization of the court ==
The United States District Court for the Northern District of Alabama is one of three federal judicial districts in Alabama. Court for the District is held at Anniston, Birmingham, Florence, Huntsville, and Tuscaloosa.

Northwestern Division comprises the following counties: Colbert, Franklin, Lauderdale, and Lawrence.

Northeastern Division comprises the following counties: Cullman, Jackson, Limestone, Madison, Marshall, and Morgan.

Southern Division comprises the following counties: Blount, Jefferson, and Shelby.

Eastern Division comprises the following counties: Calhoun, Cherokee, Clay, Cleburne, DeKalb, Etowah, St. Clair, and Talladega.

Western Division comprises the following counties: Bibb, Fayette, Greene, Lamar, Marion, Pickens, Sumter, Tuscaloosa, Walker, and Winston.

== Current judges ==
As of November 12, 2026:

#	Title	Judge	Duty station	Born	Term of service			Appointed by
#	Title	Judge	Duty station	Born	Active	Chief	Senior	Appointed by
37	Chief Judge	Madeline Haikala	Birmingham	1964	2013–present	2026–present	—	Obama
38	District Judge	Annemarie Axon	Birmingham	1973	2018–present	—	—	Trump
39	District Judge	Liles C. Burke	Huntsville	1969	2018–present	—	—	Trump
40	District Judge	Corey L. Maze	Anniston	1978	2019–present	—	—	Trump
41	District Judge	Anna M. Manasco	Birmingham	1980	2020–present	—	—	Trump
42	District Judge	Harold Mooty	Huntsville	1983	2025–present	—	—	Trump
43	District Judge	Edmund LaCour	Tuscaloosa	1985	2025–present	—	—	Trump
44	District Judge	Greg Cook	Birmingham	1962	beg. 2026	—	—	Trump
28	Senior Judge	Sharon Lovelace Blackburn	Birmingham	1950	1991–2015	2006–2013	2015–present	G.H.W. Bush
29	Senior Judge	Charles Lynwood Smith Jr.	Huntsville	1943	1995–2013	—	2013–present	Clinton
30	Senior Judge	Inge Prytz Johnson	inactive	1945	1998–2012	—	2012–present	Clinton
32	Senior Judge	Karon O. Bowdre	inactive	1955	2001–2020	2013–2019	2020–present	G.W. Bush
35	Senior Judge	Virginia Emerson Hopkins	inactive	1952	2004–2018	—	2018–present	G.W. Bush

== Former judges ==
#	Judge	Born–died	Active service	Chief Judge	Senior status	Appointed by	Reason for termination
1	Charles Tait	1768–1835	1824–1826 (Note: Reassigned from the District of Alabama. Jointly appointed to the Northern and the Southern Districts of Alabama.)	—	—	Monroe/Operation of law	resignation
2	William Crawford	1784–1849	1826–1849 (Note: Jointly appointed to the Northern and the Southern Districts of Alabama. From 1839 to 1849, Judge Crawford was jointly appointed to the Middle District of Alabama.)	—	—	J.Q. Adams	death
3	John Gayle	1792–1859	1849–1859 (Note: Jointly appointed to the Middle, Northern, and Southern Districts of Alabama.)	—	—	Taylor	death
4	William Giles Jones	1808–1883	1859–1861 (Note: Recess appointment; formally nominated on January 23, 1860, confirmed by the United States Senate on January 30, 1860, and received commission the same day. Jointly appointed to the Middle, Northern, and Southern Districts of Alabama.)	—	—	Buchanan	resignation
5	George Washington Lane	1806–1863	1861–1863	—	—	Lincoln	death
6	Richard Busteed	1822–1898	1863–1874 (Note: Recess appointment; formally nominated on January 5, 1864, confirmed by the Senate on January 20, 1864, and received commission the same day. Jointly appointed to the Middle, Northern, and Southern Districts of Alabama.)	—	—	Lincoln	resignation
7	John Bruce	1832–1901	1875–1901 (Note: Jointly appointed to the Middle and Northern Districts of Alabama. From 1875 to 1886, Judge Bruce was jointly appointed to the Southern District of Alabama.)	—	—	Grant	death
8	Thomas G. Jones	1844–1914	1901–1914 (Note: Recess appointment; formally nominated on December 5, 1901, confirmed by the Senate on December 17, 1901, and received commission the same day. Jointly appointed to the Middle and Northern Districts of Alabama.)	—	—	T. Roosevelt	death
9	Oscar Richard Hundley	1855–1921	1907–1908 (Note: Recess appointment; the Senate later rejected the appointment.); 1908–1909 (Note: Received a second recess appointment and was again rejected by the Senate.); 1909 (Note: Received a third recess appointment but resigned prior to consideration.)	—	—	T. Roosevelt; T. Roosevelt; Taft	not confirmed not confirmed resignation
10	William Irwin Grubb	1862–1935	1909–1935	—	—	Taft	death
11	Henry D. Clayton Jr.	1857–1929	1914–1929 (Note: Jointly appointed to the Middle and Northern Districts of Alabama.)	—	—	Wilson	death
12	Charles Brents Kennamer	1874–1955	1931–1936	—	—	Hoover	reassignment
13	David Jackson Davis	1878–1938	1935–1938 (Note: Recess appointment; formally nominated on January 6, 1936, confirmed by the Senate on January 22, 1936, and received commission on January 28, 1936.)	—	—	F. Roosevelt	death
14	Thomas Alexander Murphree	1883–1945	1938–1945	—	—	F. Roosevelt	death
15	Clarence H. Mullins	1895–1957	1943–1953	1948–1953	1953–1957	F. Roosevelt	death
16	Seybourn Harris Lynne	1907–2000	1946–1973	1953–1973	1973–2000	Truman	death
17	Harlan Hobart Grooms	1900–1991	1953–1969	—	1969–1991	Eisenhower	death
18	Clarence W. Allgood	1902–1991	1961–1973 (Note: Recess appointment; formally nominated on January 15, 1962, confirmed by the Senate on February 5, 1962, and received commission on February 9, 1962.)	—	1973–1991	Kennedy	death
19	Frank Hampton McFadden	1925–2020	1969–1982	1973–1982	—	Nixon	resignation
20	Sam C. Pointer Jr.	1934–2008	1970–1999	1982–1999	1999–2000	Nixon	retirement
21	James Hughes Hancock	1931–2020	1973–1996	—	1996–2020	Nixon	death
22	Junius Foy Guin Jr.	1924–2016	1973–1989	—	1989–2016	Nixon	death
23	Elbert Bertram Haltom Jr.	1922–2003	1980–1991	—	1991–2003	Carter	death
24	Robert Bruce Propst	1931–2019	1980–1996	—	1996–2019	Carter	death
25	U. W. Clemon	1943–present	1980–2009	1999–2006	—	Carter	retirement
26	William Acker	1927–2018	1982–1996	—	1996–2018	Reagan	death
27	Edwin L. Nelson	1940–2003	1990–2003	—	—	G.H.W. Bush	death
31	H. Dean Buttram Jr.	1950–present	1998–2002	—	—	Clinton	resignation
33	L. Scott Coogler	1959–present	2003–2025	2020–2023	—	G.W. Bush	retirement
34	R. David Proctor	1960–present	2003–2026	2024–2026	2026	G.W. Bush	retirement
36	Abdul K. Kallon	1969–present	2010–2022	—	—	Obama	resignation

== Chief judges ==
Chief judges have administrative responsibilities with respect to their district court. Unlike the Supreme Court, where one justice is specifically nominated to be chief, the office of chief judge rotates among the district court judges. To be chief, a judge must have been in active service on the court for at least one year, be under the age of 65, and have not previously served as chief judge.

A vacancy is filled by the judge highest in seniority among the group of qualified judges. The chief judge serves for a term of seven years, or until age 70, whichever occurs first. The age restrictions are waived if no members of the court would otherwise be qualified for the position.

When the office was created in 1948, the chief judge was the longest-serving judge who had not elected to retire, on what has since 1958 been known as senior status, or declined to serve as chief judge. After August 6, 1959, judges could not become or remain chief after turning 70 years old. The current rules have been in operation since October 1, 1982.

== Succession of seats ==
Seat 1
Seat reassigned from the District of Alabama on March 10, 1824 by 4 Stat. 9 (concurrent with Southern District)
Tait	1824–1826
Seat made concurrent with Middle District on February 6, 1839 by 5 Stat. 315
Crawford	1826–1849
Gayle	1849–1859
W. Jones	1859–1861
Lane	1861–1863
Busteed	1863–1874
Seat reassigned solely to Northern and Middle Districts on August 2, 1886 by 24 Stat. 213
Bruce	1875–1901
T. Jones	1901–1914
Clayton Jr.	1914–1929
Kennamer	1931–1936
Seat reassigned solely to Middle District on June 5, 1936 by 49 Stat. 1476

Seat 2
Seat established on February 25, 1907 by 34 Stat. 931
Hundley	1907–1908
Hundley	1908–1909
Hundley	1909
Grubb	1909–1935
Davis	1936–1938
Seat abolished on December 7, 1938 (temporary judgeship expired)

Seat 3
Seat established on March 26, 1938 by 52 Stat. 120 (temporary)
Seat became permanent upon the abolition of Seat 2 on December 7, 1938
Murphree	1938–1945
Lynne	1946–1973
Hancock	1973–1996
Johnson	1998–2012
Haikala	2013–present

Seat 4
Seat established on December 24, 1942 by 56 Stat. 1092
Mullins	1943–1953
Grooms	1953–1969
McFadden	1969–1982
Acker Jr.	1982–1996
Seat abolished on May 31, 1996 (temporary judgeship expired)

Seat 5
Seat established on May 19, 1961 by 75 Stat. 80
Allgood	1962–1973
Guin Jr.	1973–1989
Nelson	1990–2003
Hopkins	2004–2018
Maze	2019–present

Seat 6
Seat established on June 2, 1970 by 84 Stat. 294
Pointer Jr.	1970–1999
Bowdre	2001–2020
Manasco	2020–present

Seat 7
Seat established on October 20, 1978 by 92 Stat. 1629
Haltom Jr.	1980–1991
Smith Jr.	1995–2013
Burke	2018–present

Seat 8
Seat established on October 20, 1978 by 92 Stat. 1629
Propst	1980–1996
Buttram Jr.	1998–2002
Coogler	2003–2025
LaCour Jr.	2025–present

Seat 9
Seat established on October 20, 1978 by 92 Stat. 1629
Clemon	1980–2009
Kallon	2010–2022
Mooty III	2025–present

Seat 10
Seat established on December 1, 1990 by 104 Stat. 5089 (temporary)
Seat became permanent upon the abolition of Seat 4 on May 31, 1996
Blackburn	1991–2015
Axon	2018–present

Seat 11
Seat established on November 2, 2002 by 116 Stat. 1758 (temporary)
Seat made permanent on December 23, 2024 by 138 Stat. 2693
Proctor	2003–2026
Cook	2026–present

== Court decisions ==
Lucy v. Adams (1955) – A court ruling which affirmed the right of all citizens to be accepted at the University of Alabama. The U.S. Supreme Court upheld the ruling.

Armstrong v. Birmingham Board of Education (1963) – The court dismissed the plaintiff's complaint. On appeal, the Fifth Circuit reversed and ordered the desegregation of Birmingham public schools.

United States v. Wallace (1963) – The court exercised its ruling in Lucy v. Adams and ordered that colored students be permitted to enroll at the University of Alabama in Tuscaloosa. The court order led to the infamous Stand in the Schoolhouse Door incident with Governor George C. Wallace.

Jackson v. Birmingham Board of Education (2002) – A reversal of the decision rendered by the district and Eleventh Circuit. The U.S. Supreme Court held that retaliation against a person on the basis of a sexual complaint is a form of sexual discrimination under Title IX.

Ledbetter v. Goodyear Tire & Rubber Co. (2003) – The U.S. Supreme Court reversed the decision of the district court, stating that employers cannot be sued under Title VII of the Civil Rights Act over race or gender discrimination if the claims are based on decisions over 180 days. The decision of the court led Congress to pass the Lilly Ledbetter Fair Pay Act in 2009.

United States v. Alabama (2011) – The court upheld most parts of Alabama HB 56, an anti-illegal immigration bill signed by Governor Robert J. Bentley. The Eleventh Circuit reversed, invalidating much of Alabama HB 56.

== U.S. attorneys ==
Name	Term started	Term ended	Presidents served under
William Crawford	1820	1820	James Monroe
Frank Jones	1824	1826	James Monroe; John Q. Adams
Harry J. Thornton	1826	1829	John Q. Adams; Andrew Jackson
Joseph Scott	1829	1830	Andrew Jackson
Byrd Brandon	1830	1836	Andrew Jackson
John Dennis Phelan	1836	1836	Andrew Jackson
Edwin R. Wallace	1836	1839	Andrew Jackson; Martin Van Buren
Jeremiah Clemens	1839	1840	Martin Van Buren
Joseph A. S. Acklen	1840	1850	Martin Van Buren; William H. Harrison; John Tyler; James K. Polk; Zachary Taylor; Millard Fillmore
Jefferson F. Jackson	1850	1853	Millard Fillmore; Franklin Pierce
George S. Walden	1853	1859	Franklin Pierce; James Buchanan
M. J. Turnley	1859	1860	James Buchanan
Charles E. Mayer	1876	1880	Ulysses S. Grant; Rutherford B. Hayes
William H. Smith	1880	1885	Rutherford B. Hayes; James A. Garfield; Chester A. Arthur; Grover Cleveland
George H. Craig	1885	1885	Grover Cleveland
William H. Denson	1885	1889	Grover Cleveland; Benjamin Harrison
Lewis E. Parsons Jr.	1889	1893	Benjamin Harrison; Grover Cleveland
Emmet O'Neal	1893	1897	Grover Cleveland; William McKinley
William Vaughn	1897	1902	William McKinley; Theodore Roosevelt
Thomas R. Roulhac	1902	1907	Theodore Roosevelt
Oliver D. Street	1907	1913	Theodore Roosevelt; William H. Taft; Woodrow Wilson
Robert N. Bell	1913	1919	Woodrow Wilson
Erle Pettris or Pettus	1919	1922	Woodrow Wilson; Warren G. Harding
Charles B. Kennamer	1922	1931	Warren G. Harding; Calvin Coolidge; Herbert Hoover
Jim C. Smith	1931	1931	Herbert Hoover
John B. Isabell	1931	1933	Herbert Hoover; Franklin D. Roosevelt
Jim C. Smith	1933	1946	Franklin D. Roosevelt; Harry S. Truman
John D. Hill	1946	1953	Harry S. Truman; Dwight D. Eisenhower
Frank Minis Johnson	1953	1955	Dwight D. Eisenhower
Atley A. Kitchings Jr.	1955	1956	Dwight D. Eisenhower
William L. Longshore	1956	1961	Dwight D. Eisenhower; John F. Kennedy
Macon L. Weaver	1961	1969	John F. Kennedy; Lyndon B. Johnson; Richard Nixon
Wayman G. Sherrer	1969	1977	Richard Nixon; Gerald Ford; Jimmy Carter
Jesse R. Brooks	1977	1981	Jimmy Carter; Ronald Reagan
Frank W. Donaldson	1981	1992	Ronald Reagan; George H. W. Bush
Jack W. Selden	1992	1993	George H. W. Bush; Bill Clinton
Claude Harris Jr.	1993	1994	Bill Clinton
Walter Braswell	1994	1995	Bill Clinton
Caryl P. Privett	1995	1997	Bill Clinton
Gordon D. Jones	1997	2001	Bill Clinton
Alice H. Martin	2001	2009	George W. Bush; Barack Obama
Joyce Vance	2009	2017	Barack Obama
Robert O. Posey	2017	2017	Donald Trump
John E. Town	2017	2020	Donald Trump
Prim F. Escalona	2020	2026	Donald Trump; Joe Biden
Catherine L. Crosby (Acting)	2026	2026	Donald Trump
Phil Williams	2026	Present	Donald Trump

== See also ==
- Courts of Alabama
- List of current United States district judges
- List of United States federal courthouses in Alabama
