= Robert Bruce Propst =

American judge (1931–2019)

Senior Judge of the United States District Court for the Northern District of Alabama
- In office July 15, 1996 – May 14, 2019

Judge of the United States District Court for the Northern District of Alabama
- In office May 30, 1980 – July 15, 1996
- Appointed by: Jimmy Carter
- Preceded by: Seat established by 92 Stat. 1629
- Succeeded by: H. Dean Buttram Jr.

Personal details
- Born: Robert Bruce Propst; July 13, 1931 Ohatchee, Alabama
- Died: May 14, 2019 (aged 87) North Carolina
- Education: University of Alabama (BS); University of Alabama School of Law (JD)

Robert Bruce Propst (July 13, 1931 – May 14, 2019) was a senior United States district judge of the United States District Court for the Northern District of Alabama.

== Education and career ==
Propst was born in Ohatchee, Alabama and graduated from Gadsden High School. He received a Bachelor of Science degree in commerce from the University of Alabama in 1953 and a Juris Doctor from the University of Alabama School of Law in 1957. He was in the United States Army from 1953 to 1955 and was the deputy finance and accounting officer at Camp Stewart, Georgia. He became a first lieutenant. He was in private practice in Anniston, Alabama from 1957 to 1980.

== Federal judicial service ==
On January 10, 1980, Propst was nominated by President Jimmy Carter to a new seat on the United States District Court for the Northern District of Alabama created by 92 Stat. 1629. He was confirmed by the United States Senate on May 29, 1980, and received his commission on May 30, 1980. He assumed senior status on July 15, 1996. Propst died on May 14, 2019, aged 87.

== Sources ==
Legal offices
Preceded by Seat established by 92 Stat. 1629	Judge of the United States District Court for the Northern District of Alabama; 1980–1996	Succeeded by H. Dean Buttram Jr.
