= Oscar Richard Hundley =

American judge

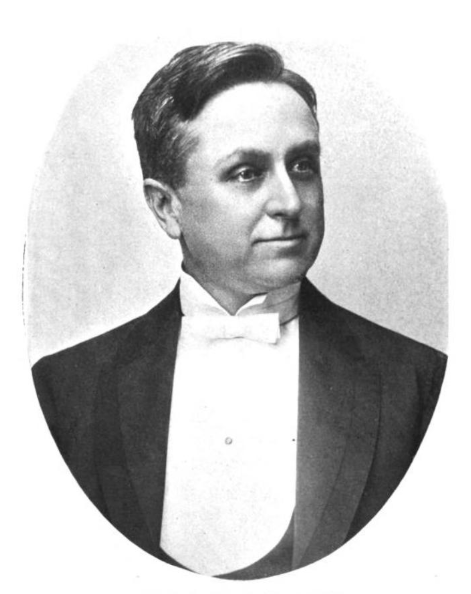

Judge of the United States District Court for the Northern District of Alabama
- In office March 6, 1909 – May 25, 1909
- Appointed by: William Howard Taft
- Preceded by: himself
- Succeeded by: William Irwin Grubb

Judge of the United States District Court for the Northern District of Alabama
- In office May 30, 1908 – March 3, 1909
- Appointed by: Theodore Roosevelt
- Preceded by: himself
- Succeeded by: himself

Judge of the United States District Court for the Northern District of Alabama
- In office April 9, 1907 – May 30, 1908
- Appointed by: Theodore Roosevlt
- Preceded by: Seat established by 34 Stat. 931
- Succeeded by: himself

Member of the Alabama Senate
- In office 1890-1898

Member of the Alabama House of Representatives
- In office 1886-1890

Personal details
- Born: Oscar Richard Hundley; October 30, 1855 Limestone County, Alabama
- Died: December 22, 1921 (aged 66) Birmingham, Alabama
- Education: Vanderbilt University Law School (LL.B.)

Oscar Richard Hundley (October 30, 1855 – December 22, 1921) was a United States district judge of the United States District Court for the Northern District of Alabama.

== Education and career ==
Born in Limestone County, Alabama, Hundley received a Bachelor of Laws from Vanderbilt University Law School in 1877. He was in private practice of law in Huntsville, Alabama from 1878 to 1907, serving as a division counsel to the Nashville, Chattanooga and St. Louis Railway from 1884 to 1907. He was city attorney of Huntsville from 1886 to 1890. He was a member of the Alabama House of Representatives from 1886 to 1890, and of the Alabama Senate from 1890 to 1898. From 1906 to 1907, he was an Assistant United States Attorney for the Northern District of Alabama.

== Federal judicial service ==
Hundley received a recess appointment from President Theodore Roosevelt on April 9, 1907, to the United States District Court for the Northern District of Alabama, to a new seat authorized by 34 Stat. 931. He was nominated to the same position by President Roosevelt on December 3, 1907. His service terminated on May 30, 1908, after his nomination was not confirmed by the United States Senate. He received a second recess appointment from President Roosevelt on May 30, 1908, to the same position. He was nominated to the same position by President Roosevelt on December 8, 1908. His service terminated on March 3, 1909, after his nomination was not confirmed by the Senate. He received a third recess appointment from President William Howard Taft on March 6, 1909, to the same position. However, President Taft did not renominate him. His service terminated on May 25, 1909, due to his resignation.

== Later career and death ==
After his resignation from the federal bench, Hundley was President and general counsel for the Sun Life Insurance Company in Birmingham, Alabama in 1913. He died in Birmingham on December 22, 1921.

== Sources ==
Legal offices
Preceded by Seat established by 34 Stat. 931	Judge of the United States District Court for the Northern District of Alabama; 1907–1908	Succeeded by himself
Preceded by himself	Judge of the United States District Court for the Northern District of Alabama; 1908–1909	Succeeded by himself
Preceded by himself	Judge of the United States District Court for the Northern District of Alabama; 1909	Succeeded by William Irwin Grubb
