= Same-sex marriage in Alabama =

Same-sex marriage has been legal in Alabama since June 26, 2015, in accordance with the U.S. Supreme Court's ruling in Obergefell v. Hodges. Not all counties immediately complied with the ruling, copying behavior from the civil rights era when they had refused to perform interracial marriages. A year after the Supreme Court ruling, twelve counties would either issue licenses to no one or only to opposite-sex couples. By 2017, this number had dropped to only eight counties, with all eight refusing to issue licenses to anyone. In May 2019, the Alabama Legislature passed a bill replacing the option that counties issue marriage licenses and perform marriage ceremonies with the requirement of counties to record marriage certificates. Subsequently, all counties complied and announced on August 29, 2019 that they would record marriage certificates for interracial and same-sex couples. Previously, Alabama had banned the licensing of same-sex marriages and the recognition of such marriages from other jurisdictions by executive order in 1996, by statute in 1998, and by constitutional amendment in June 2006.

Before the Supreme Court's decision in Obergefell on June 26, 2015, which held that the U.S. Constitution requires every U.S. state to recognize and license same-sex marriage, the legal status of same-sex marriage in Alabama had been the subject of a long legal battle. On January 23, 2015, Judge Callie V.S. Granade (Note: Judge Granade is the granddaughter of Judge Richard Rives who, in 1956, wrote the opinion in Browder v. Gayle that found racial segregation of Montgomery's bus system unconstitutional.) of the U.S. District Court for the Southern District of Alabama (Note: The United States District Court for the Southern District of Alabama covers the following 13 counties: Baldwin, Choctaw, Clarke, Conecuh, Dallas, Escambia, Hale, Marengo, Mobile, Monroe, Perry, Washington, and Wilcox.) ruled in Searcy v. Strange that Alabama's refusal to license and recognize same-sex marriages was unconstitutional. She ordered the Attorney General, Luther Strange, to stop enforcing the state's same-sex marriage bans. The Alabama Probate Judges Association issued a statement on January 24 that said "there is nothing in the judge's order [in Searcy] that requires probate judges in Alabama to issue marriage licenses to same-sex couples." The order took effect on February 9, 2015, and 47 of the state's 67 counties began issuing marriage licenses to same-sex couples that day or shortly thereafter, despite an order from Alabama Supreme Court Chief Justice Roy Moore not to do so. The other counties either issued licenses only to opposite-sex couples or stopped issuing marriage licenses altogether. The Eleventh Circuit Court of Appeals and the U.S. Supreme Court had declined state officials' requests for a stay. On March 3, 2015, the Alabama Supreme Court, ruling in a different case, ordered the state's probate judges to stop issuing marriage licenses to same-sex couples, and they promptly complied, though a number of them refused to issue any marriage licenses at all. At least 545 same-sex couples married between February 9 and March 3, 2015. Advocates for same-sex marriage rights responded with renewed efforts in federal court, and on May 21, 2015, a federal court ruled that all probate judges were obliged not to refuse to issue marriage licenses on the basis of the applicants being of the same sex, but stayed its ruling pending action by the U.S. Supreme Court.

== Legal restrictions ==
On August 29, 1996, Governor Fob James issued an executive order banning same-sex marriage and the recognition of same-sex marriages performed in other states or foreign countries. On April 9, 1998, the Alabama State House voted 79–12 in favor of a bill banning same-sex marriage and the recognition of same-sex marriages performed in other states or foreign countries. On April 13, 1998, the Alabama State Senate approved the bill in a 30–0 vote. Governor Fob James signed it into law. On March 8, 2006, the Alabama House voted 85–7 in favor of Amendment 774, a constitutional amendment to the Constitution of Alabama banning same-sex marriage and a "union replicating marriage of or between persons of the same sex" in the state. On March 11, 2006, the Alabama Senate approved the bill in a 30–0 vote, and on June 6, 2006, Alabama voters endorsed the amendment with 81% voting in favor.

== Lawsuits ==
=== Aaron-Brush v. Bentley ===
A plaintiff couple filed suit on June 10, 2014 in the U.S. District Court for the Northern District of Alabama, seeking recognition of their out-of-state marriage. The due date for motions was set at July 31, 2015, to allow for action by the U.S. Supreme Court in other cases. Following the U.S. Supreme Court's decision in Obergefell, the state filed a motion to dismiss the case. The court dismissed the case on October 13, 2015.

=== Hard v. Strange ===
On February 13, 2014, the Southern Poverty Law Center filed suit in the U.S. District Court for the Middle District of Alabama on behalf of Paul Hard, challenging the state's ban on same-sex marriage, both in its statutes and Constitution. Hard and his late husband, David Fancher, Alabama natives, had married in Massachusetts on May 20, 2011. Fancher died in an accident on August 1. The suit, originally Hard v. Bentley, named Governor Robert J. Bentley as the principal defendant, as well as several other government officials. Hard asked for a corrected death certificate and recognition as Fancher's surviving spouse, entitled to a share of the proceeds of a wrongful death suit filed by the administrator of Fancher's estate. Fancher's mother, who opposed Hard's claims and was supported by the Foundation for Moral Law, asked the district court for a ruling on her motion for summary judgement on February 5, 2015. On February 9, the Alabama Department of Public Health provided Hard a corrected death certificate. On March 10, the court removed Governor Bentley as a defendant and stayed proceedings pending action by the U.S. Supreme Court in same-sex marriage cases then scheduled for review.

On July 1, 2015, Hard asked the court to lift its stay and release the wrongful death proceeds, citing the U.S. Supreme Court decision in Obergefell. The district court did so on July 15. Pat Fancher appealed the court's ruling against her. On April 20, 2016, the Eleventh Circuit Court of Appeals affirmed the decision of the district court and ruled for Hard.

=== Searcy v. Strange ===
Plaintiffs Cari Searcy and Kimberly McKeand filed a lawsuit, originally Searcy v. Bentley, on May 7, 2014, seeking recognition of their out-of-state marriage and second-parent adoption for their minor son. In mid-June, attorneys for the couple filed a motion for summary judgment; the state defendants filed a motion to dismiss. On January 23, 2015, Judge Callie V.S. Granade of the U.S. District Court for the Southern District of Alabama ruled that Alabama's refusal to license and recognize same-sex marriages was unconstitutional. She ordered the Attorney General of Alabama, Luther Strange, to stop enforcing those bans. The plaintiffs' attorneys hoped the state would comply, though other LGBT rights advocates anticipated further litigation. Legislative leaders denounced the ruling of "a single unelected and unaccountable federal judge" or saw the ruling as evidence that "traditional values espoused by Alabamians have begun to erode even in our conservative state". Strange immediately asked for a stay of her ruling. On January 25, the plaintiffs asked the court to clarify its order, describing the probate judges "like George Wallace at the schoolhouse door staring defiantly upon this Court's order". They cited at length a 1970 ruling involving the same group of government officials that had ended enforcement of Alabama's anti-miscegenation statute, United States v. Brittain, which extended a ruling from one interracial couple who sought a marriage license and "requir[ed] the Attorney General of the State of Alabama to advise the Judges of Probate of the several counties of Alabama" to cease enforcement of an invalid law. On January 25, Judge Granade stayed her ruling for 14 days to allow Strange to seek a longer stay from the Eleventh Circuit Court of Appeals.

On January 26, Attorney General Strange filed a notice of appeal in the Eleventh Circuit, and asked for a stay of the district court's ruling pending appeal. Governor Bentley and the Probate Judges Association filed an amicus curiae in support of his request. On January 28, Judge Granade clarified her order, quoting at length from Judge Robert Lewis Hinkle's warning in the Florida case of Brenner v. Scott that those who fail to comply will bear the costs of additional suits that will produce the same result and, still quoting Hinkle: "There should be no debate ... on the question of whether a [state official] may follow the ruling, even for marriage-license applicants who are not parties to this case."

=== Strawser v. Strange ===
On January 27, 2015, Judge Granade ruled in favor of a male couple seeking the right to marry in Alabama. She stayed her ruling temporarily, setting the stay to expire on February 9 with her stay in Searcy. The couple, James N. Strawser and John E. Humphrey, had filed their suit in September 2014 without assistance of counsel after being denied a marriage license at the Mobile County Courthouse in July. At a half-hour hearing before Judge Granade on December 18, 2014, each of them testified and Strawser questioned their only other witness, Bishop David M. Carnrike, a minister of the United Gospel Holiness Church of America and presiding bishop of the Staff of Life Church Conference, who had married them on August 16. James W. Davis of the Attorney General's office cross-examined all three. On January 29, the National Center for Lesbian Rights took on the plaintiffs' representation.

==== Reactions to Searcy and Strawser rulings ====
The Alabama Probate Judges Association issued a statement on January 24 that said "There is nothing in the judge's order [in Searcy] that requires probate judges in Alabama to issue marriage licenses to same-sex couples." The next day, the editorial board of AL.com (Note: AL.com is jointly published by three newspapers: The Birmingham News, The Huntsville Times, and Mobile's Press-Register.) called on Governor Bentley and state legislators to end their opposition to same-sex marriage. On January 27, the Chief Justice of the Alabama Supreme Court, Roy Moore, released a letter addressed to Governor Bentley, in which he said that:

Our State Constitution and our morality are under attack by a federal court decision that has no basis in the Constitution of the United States. Nothing in the United States Constitution grants to the Federal Government the authority to desecrate the institution of marriage.

He welcomed the recent letter from the Probate Judges Association and warned any judge who might issue a marriage license to a same-sex couple that "the issuance of such licenses would be in defiance of the laws and Constitution of Alabama." Saying that his court was not bound by U.S. district court rulings, he wrote to Governor Bentley: "Be advised that I stand with you to stop judicial tyranny and any unlawful opinions issue without constitutional authority." Bentley responded that: "The people of Alabama voted in a constitutional amendment to define marriage as being between man and woman. As Governor, I must uphold the Constitution. I am disappointed in Friday's ruling, and I will continue to oppose this ruling. The Federal Government must not infringe on the rights of states."

Once Judge Granade clarified her order on January 28, the Probate Judges Association acknowledged that her order in Searcy, if lifted, required counties to issue marriage licenses to same-sex couples and said it would encourage its members to comply. On February 5, the Alabama Department of Public Health provided the state's probate courts with a revised marriage license application form that replaced the terms "bride" and "groom" with "spouse" and "spouse". Moore sent an order to probate judges and state employees late on February 8, the day before Granade's order was set to take effect, threatening legal action by Governor Bentley against anyone who complied with her order.

On February 3, the Eleventh Circuit rejected Strange's request to extend Judge Granade's stay and consolidated the appeals in Searcy and Strawser. Strange immediately asked Justice Clarence Thomas, Circuit Judge for the Eleventh Circuit, to extend the stay. On February 4, the Eleventh Circuit suspended proceedings in the appeal pending action by the U.S. Supreme Court in same-sex marriage cases it had accepted for review.

==== Implementation ====
Granade's orders in Searcy and Strawser took effect on February 9. Just as state offices were opening that morning, the U.S. Supreme Court declined the state's request for a stay, with Justices Antonin Scalia and Clarence Thomas dissenting. Nine counties issued marriage licenses to same-sex couples that day: Chilton, Coffee, Crenshaw, Etowah, Fayette, Jefferson, Lowndes, Madison and Montgomery. The first couple to marry were Tori Sisson and Shanté Wolfe in Montgomery. The Searcy plaintiffs re-filed the adoption petition that had been the basis of their lawsuit on February 9 as well.

That morning, Attorney General Strange issued a statement in response to the Supreme Court's action disclaiming responsibility for the issuance of marriage licenses and advising probate judges to consult their own legal counsel. That afternoon, Governor Bentley announced he agreed with Moore's statement and Thomas' dissent, but would take no action against any probate judge based on the issuance of marriage licenses to same-sex couples. Also that afternoon, the Searcy plaintiffs asked the district court to hold Don Davis, the Mobile County Probate Judge, in contempt of court for failing to open his marriage license division that day. The court denied that motion later that day because Davis was not a party to the Searcy lawsuit. U.S. Senator Jeff Sessions commented on February 9: "I think it's an unhealthy trend that judges feel that they're somehow reflecting popular opinion when first of all, it's not popular opinion, and secondly, who are they to be ruling on cases based on how they feel."

==== Further proceedings in Strawser ====
Ending the first day of legal same-sex marriage in Alabama, the Strawser plaintiffs, whose pro se suit had originally named only the Attorney General as defendant after they had been denied a marriage license in Mobile County, amended their suit to add Davis as a defendant and add three other same-sex couples seeking marriage licenses from Mobile County as plaintiffs. They also asked for a temporary restraining order or injunction preventing the defendants from enforcing Alabama's same-sex marriage ban and, for the first time in this case, sought attorney's fees. The court added the new parties the next day and scheduled a hearing on the injunction for February 12. After the hearing, Granade issued an injunction against Davis, ordering the probate judge to issue marriage licenses to same-sex couples, and Mobile County began issuing marriage licenses to same-sex couples that afternoon. On February 16, Jefferson County Probate Judge Alan King, one of the four probate judges named in the Alabama Policy Institute lawsuit in state court, asked the district court to allow him to intervene as a defendant in Strawser. He told the court that in that other suit the Alabama Policy Institute and the Alabama Citizens Action Program "acting in concert with and on behalf of the State of Alabama, are improperly attempting to seek further stay of this Court's prior Orders" from the Alabama Supreme Court. On February 17, the Strawser plaintiffs asked the district court to enforce its order by requiring Attorney General Strange to prevent the private parties' suit in the Alabama Supreme Court from proceeding, contending that Strange had the authority to have the suit dismissed and that the court's order extended through the Attorney General to such private parties who sought to frustrate the court's order. Judge King made a similar motion. In response, Strange argued that he lacked such authority over private parties, that the plaintiffs had already received the relief for which they brought suit in the first place, and that the court's order did not require any action on the part of probate judges not named as defendants in Strawser.

On February 20, Judge Granade denied King's request to intervene because he "does not seem to have an interest in the subject matter of this action". She also denied the plaintiffs' request that she order Strange to have the litigation initiated by private parties in the Alabama Supreme Court dismissed. She said the plaintiffs had not demonstrated they required further relief nor shown a link between the relief plaintiffs in this case had already received and the state court suit, whatever its outcome.

==== More proceedings in Strawser ====
On March 6, Davis asked the federal court to stay its order in Strawser, arguing that he had fulfilled its specific requirements by issuing licenses to the plaintiffs and that he could only comply with the Alabama Supreme Court's order if this court did add more plaintiff same-sex couples and require him to issue them marriage licenses. He noted that he had taken no public position on the underlying legal question of the constitutionality of Alabama's denial of marriage rights to same-sex couples and described his "unprecedented, historic and yet difficult position" when subject to conflicting orders from the federal and state courts. Judge Granade immediately asked the plaintiffs to reply to Davis' request by March 13. Later on March 6, just as Davis had anticipated, the Strawser plaintiffs asked Judge Granade to add plaintiffs and defendants to Strawser and to certify the suit as a class action. They named three more couples as plaintiffs "individually and on behalf of other similarly situated persons". Those couples had each been denied marriage licenses in two counties. They added Tim Russell, the Baldwin County Probate Judge, "as representative of a Defendant Class of similarly situated probate judges in the State of Alabama" along with Davis. As counsel for the plaintiffs, they said the National Center for Lesbian Rights was now joined by the Southern Poverty Law Center, Americans United for Separation of Church and State, and the American Civil Liberties Union (ACLU). The court gave Judge Davis until March 17 to respond.

On March 13, Madison County Circuit Judge Karen Hall granted a divorce to a lesbian couple who had married in Iowa in November 2012. They had requested the divorce on February 9 after having been denied a divorce by the same judge a year earlier.

On March 16, Judge Granade denied Davis's request that she stay her order in Strawser, and the next day gave him until March 23 to respond to the plaintiffs' request to add parties and certify the case as a class action. He responded that same day, and on March 18 Judge Granade accepted the additional parties to the suit. To Strange's objection that the lawsuit was too far advanced, she wrote that "the licenses [obtained by the plaintiffs] are of little value if they are not recognized as valid in Alabama". On April 23, she denied the Attorney General's motion to dismiss. She found that Strange was an appropriate defendant in that he had defended the state's ban in court and, in a different case, said he "maintains enforcement authority" over their application by all levels of government in the state, and because the plaintiffs sought the rights of marriage, not just marriage licenses. On May 21, Judge Granade certified the case as a class action and ordered all probate judges and those who acted in concert with them to license same-sex marriages on an equal basis with different-sex marriages, notwithstanding any provision of the State Constitution or statutes, or any ruling of the Alabama Supreme Court. She suspended implementation of her injunction pending action by the U.S. Supreme Court.

==== Final injunction in Strawser ====
On June 7, 2016, Judge Callie Granade issued a permanent injunction barring any state official from enforcing laws that fail to recognize same-sex couples' right to marry.

=== Hedgepeth v. Davis ===
Late on February 9, the attorneys in Searcy filed a new lawsuit, Hedgepeth v. Davis, on behalf of eight couples denied marriage licenses in Mobile County on February 9. They named as defendants Davis and two of his staff, Governor Bentley, Attorney General Strange, and Chief Justice Moore. They sought an emergency injunction and sanctions. Davis asked the Alabama Supreme Court for further instruction in light of the U.S. Supreme Court's action and the contempt motion filed in Searcy, which had already been dismissed, a request the court rejected on February 11, calling it a request for an advisory opinion which the court is only authorized to give to the Governor of Alabama or the Alabama Legislature. The district court denied the Hedgepeth plaintiffs immediate relief for procedural reasons, but invited their attorneys to participate in the February 12 hearing in Strawser. After Mobile County began issuing marriage licenses to same-sex couples, the plaintiffs agreed to remove county officials as defendants, leaving only Strange and Moore. On March 24, having obtained marriage licenses, they asked that their suit be dismissed.

=== State v. King ===
On February 11, 2015, two conservative groups, the Alabama Policy Institute and the Alabama Citizens Action Program, filed a lawsuit asking the Alabama Supreme Court to order the state's probate judges to deny marriage licenses to same-sex couples. (Note: The case has been referred to as Ex parte State ex rel. Alabama Policy Institute and Alabama Citizens Action Program v. King and State v. King.) The suit targeted all the state's probate judges, but identified only four of them by name. On February 13, Equality Alabama filed an amicus curiae asking the Alabama Supreme Court to dismiss the Alabama Policy Institute's lawsuit. It argued that the plaintiffs had not demonstrated a specific injury they had suffered and were seeking improperly to assume the role of state officials. The court gave the four named defendants until February 18 to file briefs, allowing the plaintiffs until 10 a.m. on February 23 to respond. One defendant, Judge Davis, argued that the lawsuit assumed no probate judge was subject to Granade's orders and could not apply to him now that he was a defendant in Strawser. Judges Alan King and Tommy Ragland offered arguments much like those of Equality Alabama. On March 3, the court ruled in a 7 to 1 decision that the plaintiffs had standing and that Alabama's ban on same-sex marriage did not violate the U.S. Constitution. It ordered all probate judges to conform to Alabama law and deny marriage licenses to same-sex couples. The court asked Judge Davis, since he was subject to Granade's orders, to explain by March 5 whether he was required to issue licenses to same-sex couples in addition to those he had already issued to the Strawser plaintiffs as required by the federal court. On that date, Davis asked the court for additional 10 days to respond. On March 11, the court rejected Davis' request for an extension and ordered him not to issue any additional marriage licenses to same-sex couples.

Following the Alabama Supreme Court's order on March 3, Judge Davis kept Mobile County's marriage license bureau closed. On March 18, Montgomery County Probate Judge Steven Reed asked the court to amend its order so that it would become ineffective if the U.S. Supreme Court ruled that state bans on same-sex marriage were unconstitutional. The court denied his request on March 23 without comment.

=== Searcy v. Davis ===
On February 24, 2015, Cari Searcy asked the U.S. District Court for the Southern District of Alabama for an injunction against Don Davis who had issued an initial adoption decree as ordered in Searcy v. Strange but added language stating "that this Decree is qualified in nature, and the Court will not issue a final adoption order until a final ruling is issued in the United States Supreme Court on the Marriage Act cases before it." On March 24, she told the court that Davis had removed the language in question and asked the court to dismiss her suit. The court granted Searcy's motion to dismiss on March 26, 2015.

=== Obergefell v. Hodges ===
On June 26, the U.S. Supreme Court ruled in Obergefell v. Hodges that the denial of marriage rights to same-sex couples is unconstitutional under the Due Process and Equal Protection clauses of the Fourteenth Amendment. Attorney General Luther Strange wrote in a news release: "While I do not agree with the opinion of the majority of the justices in their decision, I acknowledge that the U.S. Supreme Court's ruling is now the law of the land." Some probate judges began issuing marriage license that day, including those in Birmingham and Mobile, while others denied licenses to same-sex couples or issued no licenses to anyone. On June 27, 2015, the ACLU asked the Alabama Probate Judges Association to instruct its members to comply with the ruling. By June 29, 2015, at least 32 of the state's 67 counties were issuing marriage licenses to same-sex couples, and at least 22 counties were either refusing to do so or were refusing to issue marriage licenses to anybody. That same day, the Association of County Commissions, an organization that provides liability insurance to judges, recommended that judges follow the ruling of the U.S. Supreme Court.

After the release of the Obergefell decision, Justice Moore stated that the decision was subject to reconsideration for 25 days and until then not binding, while the Alabama Supreme Court was, within that time frame, asking for briefs with respect to its own order in State v. King that clerks not issue marriage licenses. He later issued a clarification: "In no way does the [Alabama Supreme Court's] order instruct probate judges of this State as to whether or not they should comply with the U.S. Supreme Court's ruling in Obergefell." On July 1, the Strawser plaintiffs asked Judge Granade to clarify the status of her order, and the same day she did so, issuing an order that said her preliminary injunction was now in effect and applied to all the state's probate judges.

== Counties issuing or refusing to issue licenses, February–March 2015 ==
Counties issuing marriage licenses on February 18, 2015, approximately the date of maximum availability Counties that issued marriage licenses to all couples Counties that issued marriage licenses to opposite-sex couples only Counties that had stopped issuing marriage licenses Question marks indicate conflicting reports. Exes mark counties that had issued licenses sometime in the week before this date.

By February 18, 2015, 47 of Alabama's 67 counties had started issuing (or announced they would issue if asked) marriage licenses to same-sex couples, as follows:

Counties that issued marriage licenses
47 counties, 82% of residents (2 others had stopped by this date)
Autauga, Baldwin, Barbour, Blount, Bullock, Butler, Calhoun, Cherokee, Chilton, Coffee, Colbert, Conecuh, Coosa, Crenshaw, Cullman, Dale, Dallas, DeKalb, Etowah, Fayette, Franklin, Greene, Hale, Henry, Jackson, Jefferson, Lamar, Lauderdale, Lawrence, Lee, Limestone, Lowndes, Macon, Madison, Mobile, Monroe, Montgomery, Morgan, Perry, Russell, St. Clair, Sumter, Talladega, Tallapoosa, Tuscaloosa, Wilcox, Winston

Counties that issued marriage licenses to opposite-sex couples only
11 counties, 10% of residents
Chambers, Clay (would not issue unless ordered to directly), Cleburne (would not issue unless ordered to directly), Covington, Elmore (issued, then stopped), Escambia (issued, then stopped), Marengo, Marion (scheduled, then changed mind), Pickens, Shelby (would not issue unless ordered to directly), Washington (awaited U.S. Supreme Court)

Counties that had stopped issuing all marriage licenses
9 counties, 8% of residents
Bibb (no decision could be made while judge out sick), Choctaw, Clarke, Geneva, Houston, Marshall (scheduled, then changed mind), Pike, Randolph, Walker

Some general reports indicated that Choctaw and Houston counties might be issuing licenses to opposite-sex couples only, but local reports in Houston were that it had instead stopped all licensing. Pickens had been scheduled to start issuing marriage licenses on February 16, but it was neither reported to have actually started issuing licenses, nor included among the counties (such as Marion and Marshall) that had similarly scheduled but reversed their decision.

On March 3, 2015, the Alabama Supreme Court ordered all probate judges in the state to stop issuing marriage licenses to same-sex couples in State v. King. By the afternoon of the next day, all or nearly all counties (Note: One source reports that of March 4, Macon County was still issuing licenses. It is possible that this was true in the morning, and that Macon had stopped issuing all licenses by the afternoon, as other sources reported.) stopped issuing such licenses. Autauga, Macon, Mobile, and Talladega stopped issuing licenses to all couples. Choctaw and Geneva, which had earlier issued no licenses, started issuing licenses to opposite-sex couples, while Bibb, Clarke, Houston, Marshall, Pike, Randolph, and Walker continued in not issuing licenses to any couples.

== Developments after legalization ==
=== Moore order and final proceedings in State v. King ===
On January 6, 2016, Alabama Chief Justice Roy Moore again ordered Alabama's probate judges to stop issuing marriage licenses to same-sex couples. Moore said the Obergefell decision differed with earlier opinions from the Alabama Supreme Court, and that the court needed to clarify the situation. Moore added that the decision did not invalidate the state's constitutional amendment, and that the decision only invalidated the bans in the states which were parties in the case: Kentucky, Michigan, Ohio and Tennessee. However, only five probate courts were known to have followed Moore's order: Elmore, Madison, Marengo, Mobile and Walker. Three of those counties (Madison, Mobile and Walker) resumed issuing marriage licenses to same-sex couples a few days later. His statement had no effect and all Alabama counties continued either issuing marriage licenses to all couples or not issue licenses at all. In May 2016, Moore was charged with ethics charges by the Alabama Judicial Inquiry Commission for the order. He was found guilty on 30 September and suspended for the remainder of his term.

On March 4, 2016, the Alabama Supreme Court dismissed all motions and petitions in State v. King, although in terms that left it unclear whether the court was acknowledging Obergefell as the law. The intended effect of the opinion was unclear; although it appeared to acknowledge the invalidity of Alabama judicial decisions post-Obergefell that attempted to challenge that decision, it did not expressly acknowledge Obergefell as the law and instead argued that Obergefell was invalid. "All motions/petitions that were filed subsequent to the original mandamus order are dismissed, technically leaving in place the original decision. But that decision (according to Justice Shaw) is a dead letter in light of Obergefell and the Strawser injunction which binds all probate court judges in Alabama", noted the legal director for the ACLU. The founder of Liberty Counsel, Mathew Staver, argued that "[t]he Judgement makes permanent the Alabama Supreme Court's order prohibiting probate judges from issuing marriage licenses to same-sex couples," adding that "[t]he Alabama Supreme Court has rejected the illegitimate opinion of five lawyers on the U.S. Supreme Court." While the intended effects of this order were unclear, the court's judges issued a number of concurrences. Judge Greg Shaw's concurrence was cited as commenting that the Alabama Supreme Court was bound to abide by the judgments of the U.S. Supreme Court, and noting that judges that failed to recognize that should resign.

=== Final holdouts ===
Counties issuing marriage licenses to all couples (blue) and counties not issuing any licenses (purple) prior to August 29, 2019

As of October 2, 2015, at least eight counties were not issuing any marriage licenses, with no indication if or when they might resume: Autauga, Choctaw, Clarke, Cleburne, Covington, Geneva, Pike and Washington. Chambers and Bibb counties confirmed on August 21 and September 4 that they were not issuing any licenses. Elmore, Madison, Marengo, Mobile and Walker stopped issuing marriage licenses on January 6, 2016 following Roy Moore's order. However, Madison, Mobile and Walker began reissuing marriage licenses to all couples a few days later. Following Judge Granade's final injunction in Strawser v. Strange in June 2016, probate courts from both Clarke and Washington reiterated that they would not issue marriage licenses to either same-sex or different-sex couples. Chambers had begun issuing marriage licenses to all couples by June 26, 2016.

A few days ahead of the first anniversary of the Obergefell decision, the ACLU found that 12 Alabama counties were still not issuing marriage licenses to same-sex couples. 11 of these counties issued no licenses at all, either to opposite-sex or to same-sex couples: Autauga, Bibb, Choctaw, Clarke, Cleburne, Covington, Elmore, Geneva, Marengo, Pike and Washington. Coosa County continued to deny marriage licenses specifically to same-sex couples, citing "technical difficulties" but admitting that it had no plans to remedy the situation. By October 2016, Bibb, Coosa and Marengo counties had begun issuing licenses to couples regardless of gender, while the other nine counties continued to refuse to issue any licenses. At least six counties which were issuing marriage licenses nevertheless refused to preside over any marriage ceremonies.

In June 2017, Ballotpedia confirmed that Choctaw County had begun issuing marriage licenses to all couples. Throughout 2018, eight Alabama counties still refused to issue marriage licenses to anyone: Autauga, Clarke, Cleburne, Covington, Elmore, Geneva, Pike and Washington. The situation was unchanged as of May 2019. All 8 remaining counties began recording marriage certificates on August 29, 2019, following a change in state law removing the obligation that probate judges perform marriage ceremonies for couples.

=== Requiring counties to record marriage certificates ===
On September 16, 2015, the Alabama House of Representatives voted 53 to 36 in favor of a bill to abolish state-issued marriage licenses. Supporters argued the bill would have protected probate judges who opposed issuing marriage licenses to same-sex couples. However, the bill failed as it needed a two-thirds majority. The Alabama Senate had previously approved the legislation. On March 15, 2016, the Senate approved a similar bill in a 23–3 vote. The House adjourned sine die without voting on the bill. A similar bill also failed in 2017. On January 16, 2018, the Alabama Senate approved another bill. It was passed 19–1, with Senator Phil Williams the sole senator to vote against it. The bill also died at the end of the legislative session, as the House did not take any action on it.

In May 2019, the Alabama Legislature passed a bill requiring probate judges to record marriage certificates for same-sex couples, but removing the obligation that they perform marriage ceremonies for them, in order to keep probate judges from violating their consciences by presiding over ceremonies of same-sex couples. The bill requires that every county record marriage certificates, replacing the previous wording that probate judges "may" issue marriage licenses. Under the new law, a couple seeking to marry is no longer required to file an application for a marriage license with the county probate court, and the courts will no longer issue marriage licenses. Once the marriage certificate is completed by both parties, notarized by two notaries public and delivered to the probate court for recording, the marriage will be declared valid. A wedding ceremony may be performed for the parties, but solemnization is no longer required for a recognized marriage in Alabama. Senator Greg Albritton, who pushed for this new bill, said he saw this as a "necessary compromise" between the two sides of the issue. The bill was signed into law by Governor Kay Ivey. All counties in the state, including the final eight holdouts, began recording marriage certificates to all couples who meet the requirements to wed on August 29, 2019.

== Native American nations ==
The Tribal Code of the Poarch Band of Creek Indians does not explicitly forbid same-sex marriage, and uses gender-neutral language with regard to married spouses. However, it is unknown if same-sex couples can marry on the reservation as tribal officials have not publicly commented on the issue.

While there are no records of same-sex marriages as understood from a Western perspective being performed in Native American cultures, there is evidence for identities and behaviours that may be placed on the LGBT spectrum. Many of these cultures recognized two-spirit individuals who were born male but wore women's clothing and performed everyday household work and artistic handiwork which were regarded as belonging to the feminine sphere. It is possible that Muscogee society had a designation like two-spirit but a lot of traditional knowledge was lost in the aftermath of colonization and the Trail of Tears for those Muscogee forcibly removed to the Indian Territory. The modern Muscogee term poyvfekcv hokkolvn (pronounced [po.jəfɪ́ktʃə hok.kôːlɪn]) may be used by two-spirit individuals.

== Demographics and marriage statistics ==
Data from the 2000 U.S. census showed that 8,109 same-sex couples were living in Alabama. By 2005, this had increased to 8,602 couples, likely attributed to same-sex couples' growing willingness to disclose their partnerships on government surveys. Same-sex couples lived in all counties of the state and constituted 0.8% of coupled households and 0.5% of all households in the state. Most couples lived in Jefferson, Mobile and Madison counties, but the counties with the highest percentage of same-sex couples were Perry (0.72% of all county households) and Hale (0.64%). Same-sex partners in Alabama were on average younger than opposite-sex partners, and more likely to be employed. However, the average and median household incomes of same-sex couples were lower than different-sex couples, and same-sex couples were also far less likely to own a home than opposite-sex partners. 25% of same-sex couples in Alabama were raising children under the age of 18, with an estimated 3,309 children living in households headed by same-sex couples in 2005.

According to the Alabama Department of Public Health, at least 545 same-sex couples obtained marriage licenses and were married between February 9 and March 3, 2015. By the end of 2015, 1,622 same-sex marriages had taken place in Alabama, accounting for about 4% of all marriages performed in the state that year. 936 and 715 same-sex couples married in Alabama in 2016 and 2017, respectively, with most taking place in Jefferson, Montgomery, Madison, Mobile and Baldwin counties.

2018 estimates from the United States Census Bureau showed that there were about 9,000 same-sex households in Alabama. The bureau estimated that 61% of same-sex couples in the state were married. The 2020 U.S. census showed that there were 6,274 married same-sex couple households (2,483 male couples and 3,791 female couples) and 5,463 unmarried same-sex couple households in Alabama.

== Public opinion ==
Public opinion for same-sex marriage in Alabama
Poll source	Dates administered	Sample size	Margin of error	Support	Opposition	Do not know / refused
Public Religion Research Institute	March 9 – December 7, 2023	266 adults	?	51%	47%	2%
Public Religion Research Institute	March 11 – December 14, 2022	?	?	53%	41%	6%
Public Religion Research Institute	March 8 – November 9, 2021	?	?	49%	47%	4%
Public Religion Research Institute	January 7 – December 20, 2020	753 adults	?	50%	35%	15%
Public Religion Research Institute	April 5 – December 23, 2017	1,100 adults	?	41%	51%	8%
Public Religion Research Institute	May 18, 2016 – January 10, 2017	1,485 adults	?	41%	48%	11%
Public Religion Research Institute	April 29, 2015 – January 7, 2016	1,308 adults	?	33%	60%	7%
Public Religion Research Institute	April 2, 2014 – January 4, 2015	820 adults	?	32%	59%	9%
New York Times/CBS News/YouGov	September 20 – October 1, 2014	692 likely voters	± 2.6%	28%	60%	12%
Mobile Register/University of South Alabama	March 2004	421 adults	?	?	80%	?

An Auburn University February 2005 survey showed that 58% of Alabamians supported a state constitutional amendment banning same-sex marriage, while 28% opposed such an amendment and 11% were undecided. Support for such an amendment was highest among Republicans at 69% compared to 38% among Democrats.

== See also ==
- LGBT rights in Alabama
- Status of same-sex marriage
- Timeline of same-sex marriage in the United States
