= Alexander Howard =

Alexander Howard may refer to:

- Alex T. Howard Jr. (1924–2011), United States district judge
- Alexander Howard, Viscount Andover (born 1974)
