= 2002 Alabama Attorney General election =

- November 5, 2002

Candidate	Bill Pryor	Boyd Whigham
Party	Republican	Democratic
Popular vote	780,524	515,123
Percentage	58.85%	38.84%
- County results Pryor: 40–50% 50–60% 60–70% 70–80% Whigham: 40–50% 50–60% 60–70% 70–80% 80–90%
Attorney General before election
Bill Pryor
Republican
Elected Attorney General
Bill Pryor
Republican

The 2002 Alabama Attorney General election was held on November 5, 2002 to elect the Alabama Attorney General. Republican incumbent Bill Pryor won re-election to a second term, defeating Democratic District attorney Boyd Whigham by 19 percentage points.

== General election ==
=== Candidates ===
- Bill Pryor, incumbent Alabama Attorney General (1997–2004) (Republican)
- Boyd Whigham, District attorney for the Third Judicial Circuit of Alabama (Democratic)
- Wilson Myers (Libertarian)

=== Results ===
2002 Alabama Attorney General election results
Party	Candidate	Votes	%	±%
Republican	Bill Pryor	780,524	58.85%	+8.59%
Democratic	Boyd Whigham	515,123	38.84%	−10.90%
Libertarian	Wilson Myers	29,202	2.20%	N/A
Write-in		1,455	0.11%	N/A
Total votes		1,326,304	100.00%	
Republican hold				
