= 2006 Alabama Amendment 774 =

Alabama Amendment 774
- June 6, 2006
- Proposing an amendment to the Constitution of Alabama of 1901, to provide that no marriage license shall be issued in Alabama to parties of the same sex and that the state shall not recognize a marriage of parties of the same sex that occurred as a result of the law of any other jurisdiction. (Proposed by Act No. 2005-35)

Results
| Choice | Votes | % |
|---|---|---|
| Yes | 697,591 | 81.18% |
| No | 161,694 | 18.82% |
| Valid votes | 859,285 | 92.74% |
| Invalid or blank votes | 67,271 | 7.26% |
| Total votes | 926,556 | 100.00% |
| Registered voters/turnout | 2,413,279 | 35.61% |
- County results Yes 90–100% 80–90% 70–80% 60–70%

The Amendment 774 of 2006, also known as Alabama Sanctity of Marriage Amendment, is an amendment to the Alabama Constitution that makes it unconstitutional for the state to recognize or perform same-sex marriages or civil unions. The legislature passed Alabama Act 2005-35, which placed this amendment on the election ballot. The referendum was approved by 81% of the voters.

Upon recompilation of the Alabama Constitution in 2022, the Amendment was recodified as Section 36.03 of Article I.

== Contents ==
The text of the amendment states:

(a) This amendment shall be known and may be cited as the Sanctity of Marriage Amendment.

(b) Marriage is inherently a unique relationship between a man and a woman. As a matter of public policy, this state has a special interest in encouraging, supporting, and protecting this unique relationship in order to promote, among other goals, the stability and welfare of society and its children. A marriage contracted between individuals of the same sex is invalid in this state.

(c) Marriage is a sacred covenant, solemnized between a man and a woman, which, when the legal capacity and consent of both parties is present, establishes their relationship as husband and wife, and which is recognized by the state as a civil contract.

(d) No marriage license shall be issued in the State of Alabama to parties of the same sex.

(e) The State of Alabama shall not recognize as valid any marriage of parties of the same sex that occurred or was alleged to have occurred as a result of the law of any jurisdiction regardless of whether a marriage license was issued.

(f) The State of Alabama shall not recognize as valid any common law marriage of parties of the same sex.

(g) A union replicating marriage of or between persons of the same sex in the State of Alabama or in any other jurisdiction shall be considered and treated in all respects as having no legal force or effect in this state and shall not be recognized by this state as a marriage or other union replicating marriage.

== Results ==
The vote for the amendment took place on 6 June 2006.

Amendment 774
| Choice | Votes | % |
|---|---|---|
| For | 697,591 | 81.18 |
| Against | 161,694 | 18.82 |
| Total | 859,285 | 100.00 |

== Legislative repeal attempts ==
Representative Patricia Todd introduced bills to repeal Amendment 774 in 2014 and 2015. These bills died in committee.

== Searcy v. Strange ==
On January 23, 2015, Chief Judge on the United States District Court for the Southern District of Alabama Callie V. Granade issued a ruling striking down Alabama's ban on same-sex marriage as violations of the Fourteenth Amendment's guarantees of equal protection and due process. Alabama supreme court justice Roy S. Moore ordered Alabama's probate judges to ignore Granade's ruling.

== See also ==
- LGBT rights in Alabama
- Same-sex marriage in Alabama
