= Attorney General Pryor =

Attorney General Pryor may refer to:

- Mark Pryor (born 1963), Attorney General of Arkansas
- William H. Pryor Jr. (born 1962), Attorney General of Alabama
