= Kristi DuBose =

American judge (born 1964)

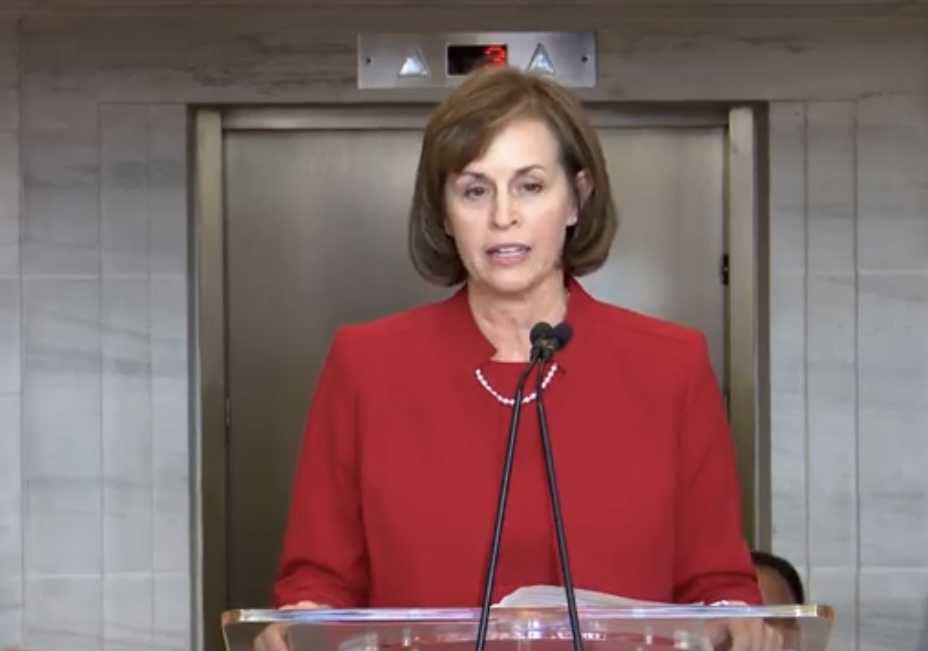

Chief Judge of the United States District Court for the Southern District of Alabama
- In office February 22, 2017 – October 1, 2021
- Preceded by: William H. Steele
- Succeeded by: Jeff Beaverstock

Judge of the United States District Court for the Southern District of Alabama
- Incumbent
- Assumed office December 27, 2005
- Appointed by: George W. Bush
- Preceded by: Charles Randolph Butler Jr.

Magistrate Judge of the United States District Court for the Southern District of Alabama
- In office January 2000 – December 2005

Deputy Attorney General of Alabama
- In office December 1994 – December 1996

Personal details
- Born: Kristi Kaye DuBose; October 1, 1964 (age 61) Brewton, Alabama, U.S.
- Education: Huntingdon College (BA); Emory University (JD)

Kristi Kaye DuBose (born October 1, 1964) is a United States district judge of the United States District Court for the Southern District of Alabama.

== Early life and education ==
Born in Brewton, Alabama, DuBose graduated from Huntingdon College with her Bachelor of Arts degree in 1986 and later graduated from the Emory University School of Law in Atlanta with her Juris Doctor in 1989.

== Career ==
DuBose started her legal career as a law clerk to former Judge Peter Beer of the United States District Court for the Eastern District of Louisiana from 1989 to 1990. In 1990, DuBose joined the US Attorney's Office as an assistant United States attorney for the Southern District of Alabama from 1990 to 1993 before being appointed Assistant district attorney in the Covington County District Attorney's Office in 1994. In 1994, DuBose was appointed by Governor Jim Folsom Jr. as a deputy attorney general in the Alabama Attorney General's Office from 1994 to 1996 before serving as chief counsel for Alabama U.S. Senator Jeff Sessions from 1997 to 1999.

=== Federal judicial service ===
On the unanimous recommendation of Senators Jeff Sessions and Richard Shelby, DuBose was nominated by President George W. Bush on September 28, 2005 to a seat vacated by Charles Randolph Butler Jr. DuBose was confirmed by the Senate on December 21, 2005 and received her commission on December 27, 2005. She served as chief judge from 2017 to 2021.

== Sources ==
Legal offices
Preceded by Charles Randolph Butler Jr.	Judge of the United States District Court for the Southern District of Alabama; 2005–present	Incumbent
Preceded by William H. Steele	Chief Judge of the United States District Court for the Southern District of Alabama; 2017–2021	Succeeded by Jeff Beaverstock
