= Richard W. Moore =

American attorney (born 1952)

Richard Moore
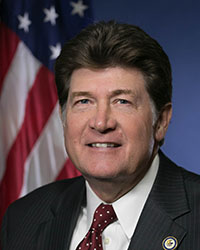

United States Attorney for the Southern District of Alabama
- In office September 22, 2017 – February 26, 2021
- President: Donald Trump; Joe Biden
- Preceded by: Kenyen R. Brown
- Succeeded by: Sean Costello (acting)

Inspector General for the Tennessee Valley Authority
- In office May 9, 2003 – September 21, 2017
- President: George W. Bush; Barack Obama; Donald Trump
- Preceded by: Donald Hickman (Acting)
- Succeeded by: Jill Matthews (Acting)

Personal details
- Born: Richard Wayne Moore; December 5, 1952 (age 73) Bartow, Florida, U.S.
- Education: Spring Hill College (BS); Samford University (JD)

Richard Wayne Moore (born December 5, 1952) is an American lawyer who served as the United States Attorney for the Southern District of Alabama from 2017 to 2021. Prior to assuming that role, he had served as the Inspector General for the Tennessee Valley Authority since 2003, when he was appointed by George W. Bush and confirmed by the United States Senate.

== Education and career ==
Moore received his Bachelor of Science, summa cum laude, from Spring Hill College in 1974 and his Juris Doctor from Cumberland School of Law in 1977. In 2015, Moore was named Cumberland School of Law's Distinguished Alumnus of the Year. From 1997 to 1998, Moore was an Atlantic Fellow in Public Policy at the University of Oxford. At Oxford, Moore conducted an independent study on the prosecution of complex international fraud cases.

Moore has practiced law in Mobile, Alabama and Cleveland, Ohio. He served as an Assistant United States Attorney for the Southern District of Alabama from 1985 to 2003. During this time, Moore served as chief of the criminal division, as senior litigation counsel, and as coordinator of the Anti-Terrorism Task Force.

Moore has served as the Inspector General for the Tennessee Valley Authority since 2003, when he was appointed by George W. Bush and confirmed by the United States Senate. From May 2009 to March 2011, Moore was the chairman of the investigations committee for the Council of Inspectors General on Integrity and Efficiency.

=== United States Attorney ===
In June 2017, Moore was announced as Donald Trump's nominee to become the United States Attorney for the Southern District of Alabama. He was confirmed by voice vote on September 14, 2017. On February 8, 2021, he along with 55 other attorneys were asked to resign by the incoming Biden administration. On February 22, 2021, Moore announced his retirement effective February 26, 2021.
