= United States District Court for the Southern District of Alabama =

United States federal district court in Alabama

- (S.D. Ala.)
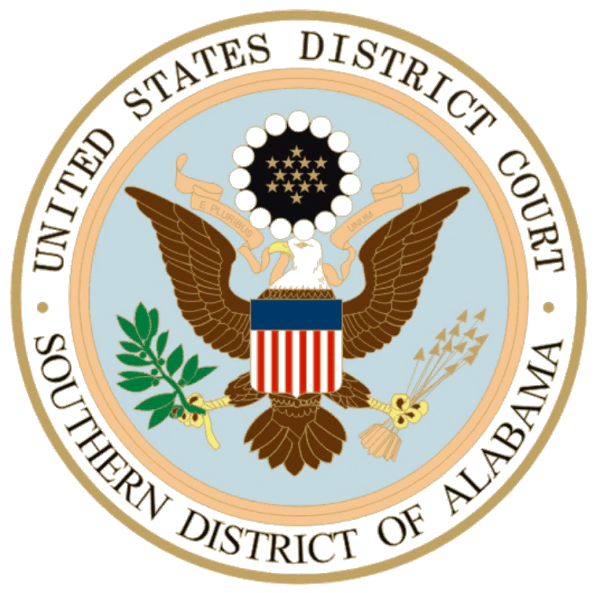

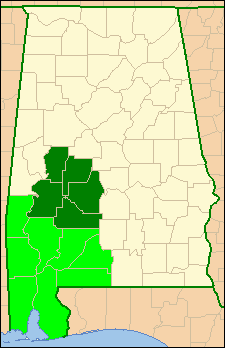
- Location: John Archibald Campbell U.S. Courthouse (Mobile) More locations: United States Post Office Building (Selma)
- Appeals to: Eleventh Circuit
- Established: March 10, 1824
- Judges: 3
- Chief Judge: Jeff Beaverstock

Officers of the court
- U.S. Attorney: Sean P. Costello
- U.S. Marshal: Mark F. Sloke
- www.alsd.uscourts.gov

The United States District Court for the Southern District of Alabama (in case citations, S.D. Ala.) is a federal court in the Eleventh Circuit (except for patent claims and claims against the U.S. government under the Tucker Act, which are appealed to the Federal Circuit).

The District was established on March 10, 1824, with the division of the state into a Northern and Southern district.

The United States Attorney's Office for the Southern District of Alabama represents the United States in civil and criminal litigation in the court. As of February 2, 2021 the United States attorney is Sean P. Costello.

== Organization of the court ==
The United States District Court for the Southern District of Alabama is one of three federal judicial districts in Alabama. Court for the District is held at Mobile and Selma.

Mobile Division comprises the following counties: Baldwin, Choctaw, Clarke, Conecuh, Escambia, Mobile, Monroe, and Washington.

Selma Division comprises the following counties: Dallas, Hale, Marengo, Perry, and Wilcox.

== Current judges ==
As of October 1, 2021:

#	Title	Judge	Duty station	Born	Term of service			Appointed by
#	Title	Judge	Duty station	Born	Active	Chief	Senior	Appointed by
21	Chief Judge	Jeff Beaverstock	Mobile	1968	2018–present	2021–present	—	Trump
20	District Judge	Kristi DuBose	Mobile	1964	2005–present	2017–2021	—	G.W. Bush
22	District Judge	Terry F. Moorer	Mobile	1961	2018–present	—	—	Trump
16	Senior Judge	Charles R. Butler Jr.	Mobile	1940	1988–2005	1994–2003	2005–present	Reagan
18	Senior Judge	Callie V. Granade	Mobile	1950	2002–2016	2003–2010	2016–present	G.W. Bush
19	Senior Judge	William H. Steele	Mobile	1951	2003–2017	2010–2017	2017–present	G.W. Bush

== Former judges ==
#	Judge	Born–died	Active service	Chief Judge	Senior status	Appointed by	Reason for termination
1	Charles Tait	1768–1835	1824–1826 (Note: Reassigned from the District of Alabama. Jointly appointed to the Northern and the Southern Districts of Alabama.)	—	—	Monroe/Operation of law	resignation
2	William Crawford	1784–1849	1826–1849 (Note: Jointly appointed to the Northern and the Southern Districts of Alabama. From 1839 to 1849, Judge Crawford was jointly appointed to the Middle District of Alabama.)	—	—	J.Q. Adams	death
3	John Gayle	1792–1859	1849–1859 (Note: Jointly appointed to the Middle, Northern, and Southern Districts of Alabama.)	—	—	Taylor	death
4	William Giles Jones	1808–1883	1859–1861 (Note: Recess appointment; formally nominated on January 23, 1860, confirmed by the United States Senate on January 30, 1860, and received commission the same day. Jointly appointed to the Middle, Northern, and Southern Districts of Alabama.)	—	—	Buchanan	resignation
5	George Washington Lane	1806–1863	1861–1863	—	—	Lincoln	death
6	Richard Busteed	1822–1898	1863–1874 (Note: Recess appointment; formally nominated on January 5, 1864, confirmed by the Senate on January 20, 1864, and received commission the same day. Jointly appointed to the Middle, Northern, and Southern Districts of Alabama.)	—	—	Lincoln	resignation
7	John Bruce	1832–1901	1875–1886	—	—	Grant	reassignment
8	Harry Theophilus Toulmin	1838–1916	1887–1916	—	—	Cleveland	death
9	Robert Tait Ervin	1863–1949	1917–1935	—	1935–1949	Wilson	death
10	John McDuffie	1883–1950	1935–1950	—	—	F. Roosevelt	death
11	Daniel Holcombe Thomas	1906–2000	1951–1971	1966–1971	1971–2000	Truman	death
12	Thomas Virgil Pittman	1916–2012	1966–1981 (Note: From 1966 to 1970, Judge Pittman was jointly appointed to the Middle and Southern Districts of Alabama.)	1971–1981	1981–2012	L. Johnson	death
13	William Brevard Hand	1924–2008	1971–1989	1981–1989	1989–2008	Nixon	death
14	Emmett Ripley Cox	1935–2021	1981–1988	—	—	Reagan	elevation
15	Alex T. Howard Jr.	1924–2011	1986–1996	1989–1994	1996–2011	Reagan	death
17	Richard W. Vollmer Jr.	1926–2003	1990–2000	—	2000–2003	G.H.W. Bush	death

== Chief judges ==
Chief judges have administrative responsibilities with respect to their district court. Unlike the Supreme Court, where one justice is specifically nominated to be chief, the office of chief judge rotates among the district court judges. To be chief, a judge must have been in active service on the court for at least one year, be under the age of 65, and have not previously served as chief judge.

A vacancy is filled by the judge highest in seniority among the group of qualified judges. The chief judge serves for a term of seven years, or until age 70, whichever occurs first. The age restrictions are waived if no members of the court would otherwise be qualified for the position.

When the office was created in 1948, the chief judge was the longest-serving judge who had not elected to retire, on what has since 1958 been known as senior status, or declined to serve as chief judge. After August 6, 1959, judges could not become or remain chief after turning 70 years old. The current rules have been in operation since October 1, 1982.

== Succession of seats ==
Seat 1
Seat reassigned from the District of Alabama on March 10, 1824 by 4 Stat. 9 (concurrent with Northern District)
Tait	1824–1826
Crawford	1826–1849
Seat made concurrent with Middle District on February 6, 1839 by 5 Stat. 315
Gayle	1849–1859
Jones	1859–1861
Lane	1861–1863
Busteed	1863–1874
Bruce	1875–1886
Seat reassigned solely to Northern and Middle Districts on August 2, 1886, by 24 Stat. 213

Seat 2
Seat established on August 2, 1886 by 24 Stat. 213
Toulmin	1887–1916
Ervin	1917–1935
McDuffie	1935–1950
Thomas	1951–1971
Hand	1971–1989
Vollmer, Jr.	1990–2000
Steele	2003–2017
Moorer	2018–present

Seat 3
Seat established on March 18, 1966 by 80 Stat. 75 (concurrent with Middle District)
Seat reassigned solely to the Southern District on June 2, 1970 by 84 Stat. 294
Pittman	1966–1981
Cox	1981–1988
Butler, Jr.	1988–2005
DuBose	2005–present

Seat 4
Seat established on July 10, 1984 by 98 Stat. 333
Howard, Jr.	1986–1996
Granade	2002–2016
Beaverstock	2018–present

== Court decisions ==
Wallace v. Jaffree (1983) – Court affirmed that silent prayer was permissible in Mobile County public schools. Decision was reversed by Eleventh Circuit and U.S. Supreme Court, both ruling that it violated the Establishment Clause of the First Amendment.

Smith v. Board of School Commissioners of Mobile County (1987) – Court rules that textbooks promoting secular humanism were unconstitutional, running contrary to the Establishment Clause of the First Amendment. Decision was reversed by Eleventh Circuit, which held that secular humanism was not a violation of the Establishment Clause as it is not a system of belief constituting a "religion".

Searcy v. Strange (2015) – District Judge Callie V. S. "Ginny" Granade ruled that Alabama's ban on same-sex marriage was unconstitutional, violating the 14th Amendment's equal protection clause, on January 23. Days later, she issued an order clarifying her ruling, saying that all Alabama probate judges, who issue marriage licenses, must comply with the order. She stayed her order for two weeks to allow state defendants time to seek a stay from a higher court. On February 3, the Eleventh Circuit denied the stay, after denying a stay in a similar case out of Florida months before. On February 9, as the order was set to take effect, the U.S. Supreme Court also denied the stay.

== U.S. Attorneys ==
- Henry Hitchcock (1825–1830)
- John Elliot (1830–1835)
- John Forsyth Jr (1835–1838)
- George W. Gayle (1838–1842)
- George I. S. Walker (1842–1846)
- Alexander B. Meek 1846–1850
- Peter Hamilton 1850
- A. J. Require 1850–1858
- John P. Southworth 1869
- George M. Duskin 1877–1885
- John D. Burnett 1885–1889
- Morris D. Wickersham 1889–1893
- Joseph N. Miller 1893–1897
- Morris D. Wickersham 1897–1904
- William H. Armbecht 1904–1912
- James B. Sloan 1912–1913
- Alexander D. Pitts 1913–1922
- Aubrey Boyles 1922–1926
- Nicholas E. Stallworth 1926–1927
- Alexander C. Birch 1927–1935
- Francis H. Inge 1935–1943
- Albert J. Tully 1943–1948
- Percy C. Fountain 1948–1956
- Ralph Kennamer 1956–1961
- Vernol R. Jansen, Jr. 1961–1969
- Charles S. Spunner-White Jr (1969–1977)
- William A. Kimbrough Jr (1977–1981)
- William R. Favre Jr (1981)
- J. B. Sessions, III (1981–1993)
- Edward Vulevich Jr (1993–1995)
- J. Don Foster (1995–2000)
- David Preston York (2002–2005)
- Deborah Jean Johnson Rhodes (2005–2009)
- Kenyen R. Brown (2009–2017)
- Richard W. Moore (2017–2021)
- Sean P. Costello (2021–present)

== See also ==
- Courts of Alabama
- List of current United States district judges
- List of United States federal courthouses in Alabama
