= 1934 Alabama gubernatorial election =

- November 2, 1934
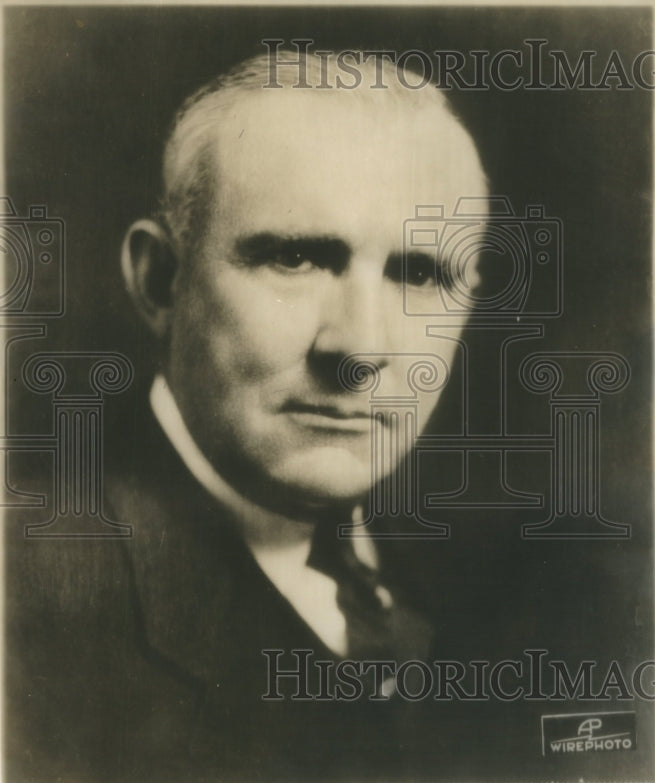

| Nominee | Bibb Graves | Edmund H. Dryer |
| Party | Democratic | Republican |
| Popular vote | 155,197 | 22,621 |
| Percentage | 86.93% | 12.67% |
- County results Graves: 50–60% 60–70% 70–80% 80–90% >90% Dryer: 50–60%
Governor before election
Benjamin M. Miller
Democratic
Elected Governor
Bibb Graves
Democratic

The 1934 Alabama gubernatorial election took place on November 2, 1934, in order to elect the governor of Alabama. Democratic incumbent Benjamin M. Miller was term-limited, and could not seek a second consecutive term.

== Democratic primary ==
At the time this election took place, Alabama, as with most other southern states, was solidly Democratic, and the Republican Party had such diminished influence that the Democratic primary was the de facto contest for state offices; after winning the Democratic primary it was a given you would win the general election.

=== Candidates ===
- Frank M. Dixon, attorney
- Bibb Graves, former Governor
- Leon Clarence McCord, circuit court judge

=== Results ===
1934 Alabama Democratic gubernatorial primary
| Party | Candidate | Votes | % |
|---|---|---|---|
| Democratic | Bibb Graves | 132,462 | 43.41 |
| Democratic | Frank M. Dixon | 97,508 | 31.95 |
| Democratic | Leon Clarence McCord | 75,208 | 24.64 |
| Total votes | | 305,178 | 100 |

=== Runoff ===
As no candidate received a majority of votes, a runoff election was held.

1934 Alabama Democratic gubernatorial primary runoff
| Party | Candidate | Votes | % |
|---|---|---|---|
| Democratic | Bibb Graves | 157,140 | 53.73 |
| Democratic | Frank M. Dixon | 135,309 | 46.27 |
| Total votes | | 292,449 | 100.00 |

== Results ==
1934 Alabama gubernatorial election
| Party | Candidate | Votes | % |
|---|---|---|---|
| Democratic | Bibb Graves | 155,197 | 86.93 |
| Republican | Edmund H. Dryer | 22,621 | 12.67 |
| Socialist | Arlie Barber | 440 | 0.25 |
| Communist | J. M. Davis | 270 | 0.15 |
| Total votes | | 178,528 | 100.00 |
| Democratic hold | | | |
