= Leon Clarence McCord =

American judge (1878–1952)

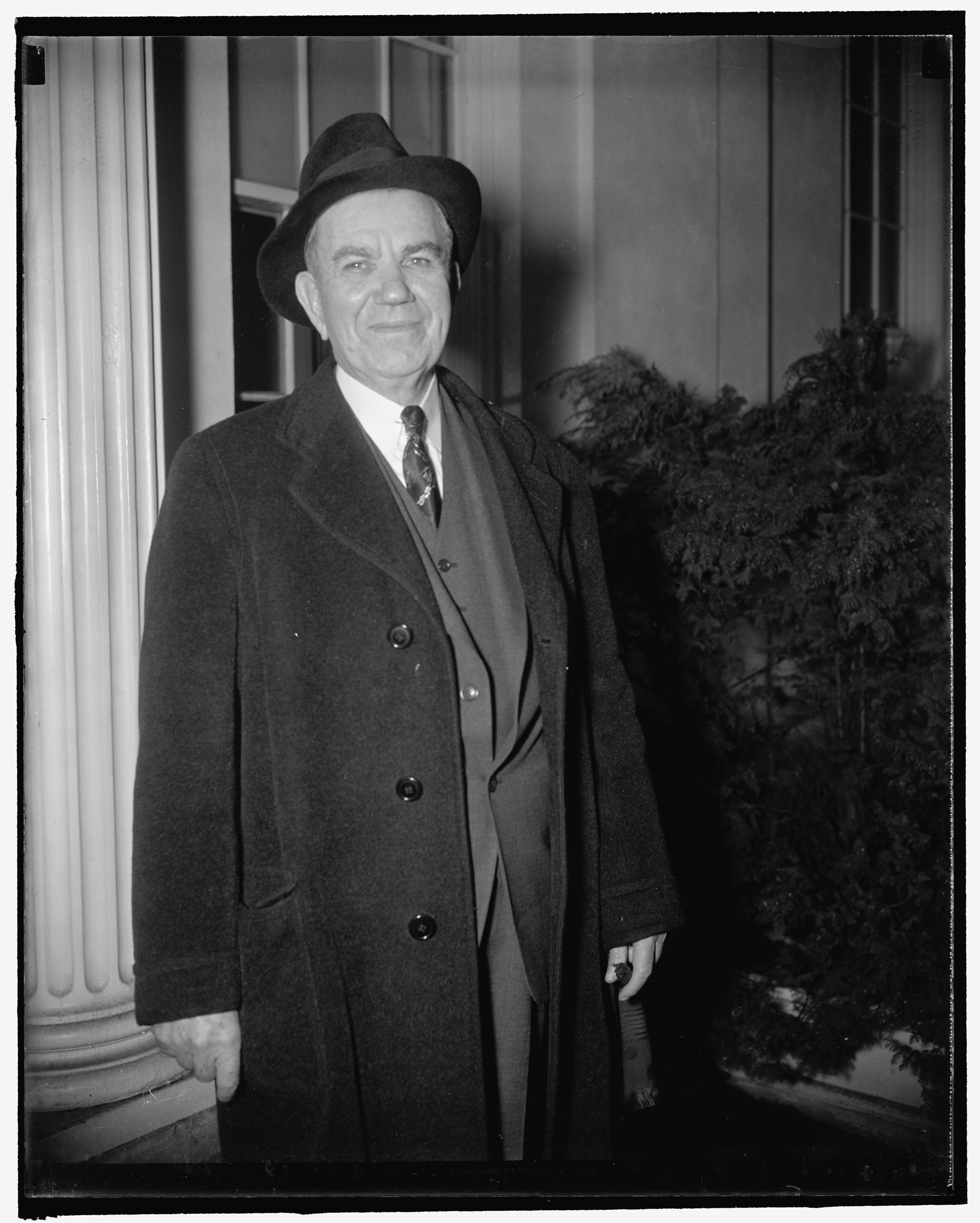

Senior Judge of the United States Court of Appeals for the Fifth Circuit
- In office February 26, 1951 – February 11, 1952

Judge of the United States Court of Appeals for the Fifth Circuit
- In office June 24, 1938 – February 26, 1951
- Appointed by: Franklin D. Roosevelt
- Preceded by: Seat established by 52 Stat 584
- Succeeded by: Richard Rives

Personal details
- Born: Leon Clarence McCord; June 21, 1878 Conyers, Georgia
- Died: February 11, 1952 (aged 73)
- Party: Democratic
- Education: Vanderbilt University read law

Leon Clarence McCord (June 21, 1878 – February 11, 1952) was a United States circuit judge of the United States Court of Appeals for the Fifth Circuit.

== Education and career ==
Born in Conyers, Georgia, McCord attended Vanderbilt University and read law to enter the bar in 1900. He was in private practice in Scottsboro, Alabama from 1900 to 1903. He was a Secretary of the Supreme Court of Alabama from 1903 to 1909. He was in private practice in Montgomery, Alabama from 1910 to 1916. He was the Railroad Commissioner for Alabama from 1911 to 1915. He was a Judge of the Circuit Court for the 15th Judicial Circuit of Alabama from 1916 to 1935, serving as Presiding Judge from 1919 to 1935. He was the Democratic candidate for Governor of Alabama in 1934. McCord was in private practice in Montgomery from 1935 to 1938.

== Federal judicial service ==
McCord was nominated by President Franklin D. Roosevelt on June 9, 1938, to the United States Court of Appeals for the Fifth Circuit, to a new seat created by 52 Stat. 584. He was confirmed by the United States Senate on June 15, 1938, and received his commission on June 24, 1938. He assumed senior status on February 26, 1951. McCord served in that capacity until his death on February 11, 1952.

== Sources ==
Legal offices
Preceded by Seat established by 52 Stat. 584	Judge of the United States Court of Appeals for the Fifth Circuit; 1938–1951	Succeeded by Richard Rives
