= Terry F. Moorer =

American judge (born 1961)

Terry Moorer
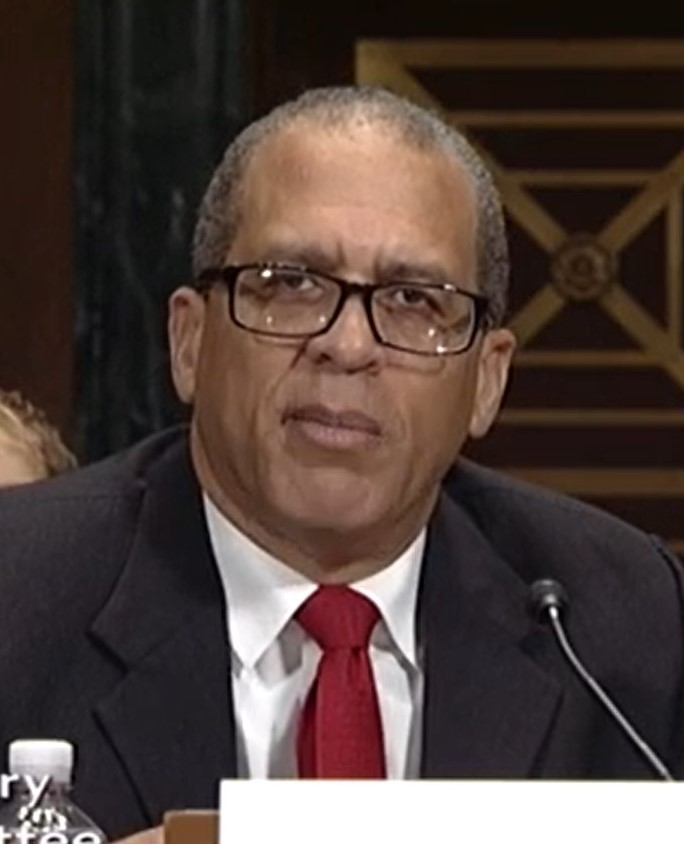

Judge of the United States District Court for the Southern District of Alabama
- Incumbent
- Assumed office September 4, 2018
- Appointed by: Donald Trump
- Preceded by: William Steele

Magistrate Judge of the United States District Court for the Middle District of Alabama
- In office 2007–2018

Personal details
- Born: January 20, 1961 (age 65) Greenville, Alabama, U.S.
- Education: Marion Military Institute (AA); Huntingdon College (BA); University of Alabama (JD)

Military service
- Allegiance: United States
- Branch/service: United States Army
- Years of service: 1981–2014
- Rank: Colonel
- Unit: Alabama Army National Guard
- Awards: Legion of Merit; Bronze Star; Army Commendation Medal (2); Army Achievement Medal; Army Reserve Component Achievement Medal (2); National Defense Service Medal (2); Armed Forces Reserve Medal (4); Army Service Ribbon

Terry Fitzgerald Moorer (born January 20, 1961) is a United States district judge of the United States District Court for the Southern District of Alabama. He was formerly a United States magistrate judge of the United States District Court for the Middle District of Alabama.

== Biography ==
Moorer earned his Associate of Arts from the Marion Military Institute, his Bachelor of Arts from Huntingdon College, and his Juris Doctor from the University of Alabama School of Law.

Before assuming his judgeship, Judge Moorer served as an Assistant United States Attorney for the Middle District of Alabama, as a Command Judge Advocate in Camp Arifjan, Kuwait, and as an attorney in the Office of Staff Judge Advocate at Fort Rucker. As a colonel in the Alabama National Guard, Moorer was the primary architect of the Alabama Code of Military Justice.

=== Federal judicial service ===
Moorer served as a United States magistrate judge of the United States District Court for the Middle District of Alabama, a position he assumed on January 3, 2007, and left on September 4, 2018, when he became a district judge.

On May 8, 2017, President Donald Trump announced his intent to nominate Moorer to an unspecified seat on the United States District Court for the Middle District of Alabama.

On September 7, 2017, President Trump nominated Moorer to serve as a United States district judge of the United States District Court for the Southern District of Alabama, to the seat vacated by Judge William H. Steele, who assumed senior status on June 8, 2017. On November 1, 2017, a hearing on his nomination was held before the Senate Judiciary Committee. On December 7, 2017, his nomination was reported out of committee by voice vote.

On January 3, 2018, his nomination was returned to the President under Rule XXXI, Paragraph 6 of the United States Senate. On January 5, 2018, President Trump announced his intent to renominate Moorer to a federal judgeship. On January 8, 2018, his renomination was sent to the Senate. On January 18, 2018, his nomination was reported out of committee by a 17–4 vote. On August 28, 2018, his nomination was confirmed by voice vote. He received his judicial commission on September 4, 2018.

Moorer was one of three judges that ruled Alabama's proposed redistricting maps unconstitutional under Section 2 of the Voting Rights Act. The three judge panel's ruling was upheld by the U.S. Supreme Court in Allen v. Milligan.

== See also ==
- List of African-American federal judges
- List of African-American jurists

Legal offices
Preceded by William H. Steele	Judge of the United States District Court for the Southern District of Alabama; 2018–present	Incumbent
