= Charles R. Butler Jr. =

American judge (born 1940)

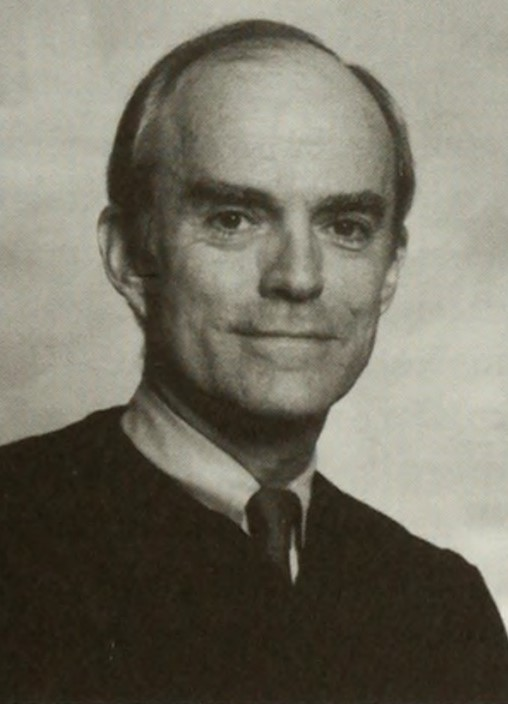

Senior Judge of the United States District Court for the Southern District of Alabama
- Incumbent
- Assumed office March 28, 2005

Chief Judge of the United States District Court for the Southern District of Alabama
- In office 1994–2003
- Preceded by: Alex T. Howard Jr.
- Succeeded by: Callie V. Granade

Judge of the United States District Court for the Southern District of Alabama
- In office October 17, 1988 – March 28, 2005
- Appointed by: Ronald Reagan
- Preceded by: Emmett Ripley Cox
- Succeeded by: Kristi DuBose

Personal details
- Born: Charles Randolph Butler Jr. March 28, 1940 (age 86) New York City, U.S.
- Education: Washington and Lee University (BA); University of Alabama (LLB)

Charles Randolph Butler Jr. (born March 28, 1940) is a senior United States district judge of the United States District Court for the Southern District of Alabama.

== Education ==
Butler was born in New York City. He received a Bachelor of Arts degree from Washington and Lee University in 1962 and was a lieutenant in the United States Army, 8th Artillery, 7th Howitzer Battalion from 1962 to 1964. He attended Washington and Lee University School of Law before receiving a Bachelor of Laws from the University of Alabama School of Law in 1966.

== Career ==
Following his admission to the Alabama bar, Butler joined the law firm of his grandfather and father, later known as Hamilton, Butler, Riddick, Tarlton and Sullivan in Mobile, Alabama. After three years in that private practice (from 1966 to 1969), Butler helped found Mobile's first public defender service and worked as an assistant public defender for Mobile County from 1969 to 1970. He then won election as district attorney of Mobile County, although just 30 years old, and served from 1971 to 1975. In 1971 the Mobile Jaycees named him one of the Outstanding Young Men of America. Butler then returned to private practice until 1988.

=== Federal judicial service ===
On April 28, 1988, Butler was nominated by President Ronald Reagan to a seat on the United States District Court for the Southern District of Alabama vacated by Judge Emmett Ripley Cox. Butler was confirmed by the United States Senate on October 14, 1988, and received his commission on October 17, 1988. He served as Chief Judge from 1994 to 2003, and assumed senior status on March 28, 2005. He presided over corruption trials of Mobile City Commissioner Lambert Mims and Mobile County Commissioner Freeman Jockisch. The Alabama State Bar awarded him its Judicial Award of Merit in 2003.

== Sources ==
Legal offices
Preceded by Emmett Ripley Cox	Judge of the United States District Court for the Southern District of Alabama; 1988–2005	Succeeded by Kristi DuBose
Preceded by Alex T. Howard Jr.	Chief Judge of the United States District Court for the Southern District of Alabama; 1994–2003	Succeeded by Callie V. Granade
