= Richard W. Vollmer Jr. =

American judge (1926–2003)

Senior Judge of the United States District Court for the Southern District of Alabama
- In office December 31, 2000 – March 20, 2003

Judge of the United States District Court for the Southern District of Alabama
- In office May 14, 1990 – December 31, 2000
- Appointed by: George H. W. Bush
- Preceded by: William Brevard Hand
- Succeeded by: William H. Steele

Personal details
- Born: Richard W. Vollmer Jr. March 7, 1926 St. Louis, Missouri, U.S.
- Died: March 20, 2003 (aged 77) Mobile, Alabama, U.S.
- Education: University of Alabama School of Law (LLB)

Richard W. Vollmer Jr. (March 7, 1926 – March 20, 2003) was a United States district judge of the United States District Court for the Southern District of Alabama.

== Education and career ==
Born in St. Louis, Missouri, Vollmer was in the United States Navy during World War II, from 1944 to 1946, and again from 1950 to 1952. He received a Bachelor of Laws from the University of Alabama School of Law in 1953. He was a Claims Representative for the State Farm Mutual Automobile Insurance Company from 1953 to 1956. He was in private practice in Mobile, Alabama from 1956 to 1990.

== Federal judicial service ==
On March 30, 1990, Vollmer was nominated by President George H. W. Bush to a seat on the United States District Court for the Southern District of Alabama vacated by Judge William Brevard Hand. Vollmer was confirmed by the United States Senate on May 11, 1990, and received his commission on May 14, 1990. He assumed senior status on December 31, 2000. Vollmer served in that capacity until his death, in 2003, in Mobile.

== Sources ==
- FJC Bio

Legal offices
Preceded by William Brevard Hand	Judge of the United States District Court for the Southern District of Alabama; 1990–2000	Succeeded by William H. Steele
