= Jeff Beaverstock =

American judge (born 1968)

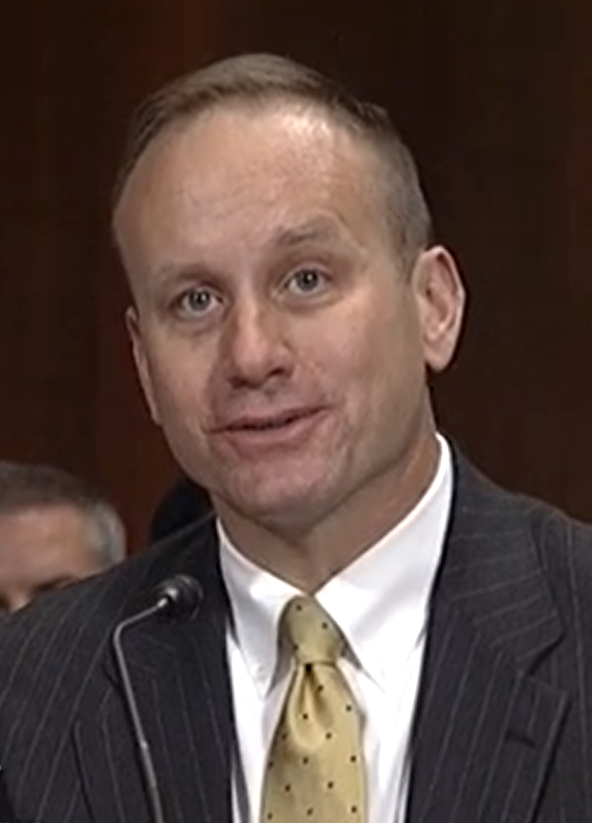

Chief Judge of the United States District Court for the Southern District of Alabama
- Incumbent
- Assumed office October 1, 2021
- Preceded by: Kristi DuBose

Judge of the United States District Court for the Southern District of Alabama
- Incumbent
- Assumed office August 3, 2018
- Appointed by: Donald Trump
- Preceded by: Callie V. Granade

Personal details
- Born: Jeffrey Uhlman Beaverstock; November 29, 1968 (age 57) Waterbury, Connecticut, U.S.
- Party: Republican
- Education: The Citadel (BA); University of Alabama (JD)

Military service
- Allegiance: United States
- Branch/service: United States Army (1991–1995); United States Army Reserve (1995–present)
- Rank: Lieutenant Colonel
- Unit: Army Judge Advocate General's Corps; 377th Theater Sustainment Command
- Awards: Meritorious Service Medal (with bronze oak leaf cluster); Army Commendation Medal (with three bronze oak leaf clusters) Army Achievement Medal (with three bronze oak leaf clusters); Army Reserve Components Achievement Medal; National Defense Service Medal (with bronze star); Army Reserve Components Overseas Training Ribbon; Army Service Ribbon

Jeffrey Uhlman Beaverstock (born November 29, 1968) is the chief United States district judge of the United States District Court for the Southern District of Alabama.

== Early life ==
Beaverstock was born in 1968 in Waterbury, Connecticut.

Beaverstock earned his Bachelor of Arts from The Citadel, where he was selected as the Distinguished Military Graduate and as the Most Outstanding Army Cadet. He earned his Juris Doctor from the University of Alabama School of Law, where he served as managing editor of the Alabama Law Review.

== Military service and legal career ==
Before entering legal practice, he served on active duty for four years as an Airborne Ranger Infantry Officer in the U.S. Army, and has served in the U.S. Army Reserve since leaving active duty. He currently holds the rank of Lieutenant Colonel in the Judge Advocate General's Corps of the U.S. Army Reserve and is the Chief of Contract and Administrative Law for the 377th Theater Sustainment Command.

== Civilian legal career ==
Before becoming a judge, Beaverstock was a partner in the Mobile, Alabama, office of Burr & Forman, LLP, where his practice focused on civil and commercial litigation in state and federal courts. He specialized in construction law, maritime law, as well as mortgage foreclosure cases.

=== Federal judicial service ===
On September 7, 2017, President Donald Trump nominated Beaverstock to serve as a United States district judge of the United States District Court for the Southern District of Alabama, to the seat vacated by Judge Callie V. Granade, who assumed senior status on March 7, 2016. On October 17, 2017, a hearing on his nomination was held before the Senate Judiciary Committee. On November 9, 2017, his nomination was reported out of committee by voice vote.

On January 3, 2018, his nomination was returned to the President under Rule XXXI, Paragraph 6 of the United States Senate. On January 5, 2018, President Donald Trump announced his intent to renominate Beaverstock to a federal judgeship. On January 8, 2018, his renomination was sent to the Senate. On January 18, 2018, his nomination was reported out of committee by a 16–5 vote. On August 1, 2018, his nomination was confirmed by voice vote. He received his judicial commission on August 3, 2018. He became chief judge on October 1, 2021.

Legal offices
Preceded by Callie V. Granade	Judge of the United States District Court for the Southern District of Alabama; 2018–present	Incumbent
Preceded by Kristi DuBose	Chief Judge of the United States District Court for the Southern District of Alabama; 2021–present	Incumbent
