= John Bruce (judge) =

American judge

Judge of the United States District Court for the Middle District of Alabama Judge of the United States District Court for the Northern District of Alabama
- In office February 27, 1875 – October 1, 1901
- Appointed by: Ulysses S. Grant
- Preceded by: Richard Busteed
- Succeeded by: Thomas G. Jones

Judge of the United States District Court for the Southern District of Alabama
- In office February 27, 1875 – August 2, 1886
- Appointed by: Ulysses S. Grant
- Preceded by: Richard Busteed
- Succeeded by: Seat abolished

Member of the Alabama House of Representatives
- In office 1872-1874

Personal details
- Born: John Bruce; February 16, 1832 Stirlingshire, Scotland
- Died: October 1, 1901 (aged 69) Wernersville, Pennsylvania
- Education: Franklin College (A.B.) read law

John Bruce (February 16, 1832 – October 1, 1901) was a United States district judge of the United States District Court for the Middle District of Alabama, the United States District Court for the Northern District of Alabama and the United States District Court for the Southern District of Alabama.

== Education and career ==
Born in Stirlingshire, Scotland, Bruce received an Artium Baccalaureus degree from Franklin College in New Athens, Ohio in 1854 and read law to enter the bar in 1856. He was in private practice in Keokuk, Iowa from 1856 to 1862. He was in the Union Army during the American Civil War from 1862 to 1865 and became a colonel. He was a farmer in Prairie Bluff, Alabama from 1866 to 1872, serving as a member of the Alabama House of Representatives from 1872 to 1874.

== Federal judicial service ==
Bruce was nominated by President Ulysses S. Grant on February 23, 1875, to a joint seat on the United States District Court for the Middle District of Alabama, the United States District Court for the Northern District of Alabama and the United States District Court for the Southern District of Alabama vacated by Judge Richard Busteed. He was confirmed by the United States Senate on February 27, 1875, and received his commission the same day. He was reassigned to serve only in the Middle District and Northern District on August 2, 1886. His service terminated on October 1, 1901, due to his death at the Walters Park sanitarium near Wernersville, Pennsylvania.

== Sources ==
Legal offices
Preceded by Richard Busteed	Judge of the United States District Court for the Southern District of Alabama; 1875–1886	Succeeded by Seat abolished
Preceded by Richard Busteed	Judge of the United States District Court for the Middle District of Alabama; Judge of the United States District Court for the Northern District of Alabama; 1875–1901	Succeeded by Thomas G. Jones
