= William Giles Jones =

American judge (1808–1883)

Judge of the United States District Court for the Middle District of Alabama Judge of the United States District Court for the Northern District of Alabama Judge of the United States District Court for the Southern District of Alabama
- In office September 29, 1859 – January 12, 1861
- Appointed by: James Buchanan
- Preceded by: John Gayle
- Succeeded by: George Washington Lane

Personal details
- Born: William Giles Jones; November 7, 1808 Powhatan County, Virginia
- Died: April 1, 1883 (aged 74) Mobile, Alabama
- Education: Hampden–Sydney College; University of Virginia read law

William Giles Jones (November 7, 1808 – April 1, 1883) was a United States district judge of the United States District Court for the Middle District of Alabama, the United States District Court for the Northern District of Alabama and the United States District Court for the Southern District of Alabama.

== Education and career ==
Born in Powhatan County, Virginia, Jones attended Hampden–Sydney College and the University of Virginia before reading law to enter the bar in 1830. He was in private practice in Virginia from 1830 to 1834, then worked as a clerk in the United States Land Office in Demopolis, Alabama, resuming his private practice in West Greene and Eutaw, Alabama from 1836 to 1843. He was a member of the Alabama House of Representatives in 1843, thereafter relocating his private practice to Mobile, Alabama from 1843 to 1860. He again served in the Alabama House of Representatives in 1849 and in 1857.

== Federal judicial service ==
Jones received a recess appointment from President James Buchanan on September 29, 1859, to a joint seat on the United States District Court for the Middle District of Alabama, the United States District Court for the Northern District of Alabama and the United States District Court for the Southern District of Alabama vacated by Judge John Gayle. He was nominated to the same position by President Buchanan on January 23, 1860. He was confirmed by the United States Senate on January 30, 1860, and received his commission the same day. His service terminated on January 12, 1861, due to his resignation.

== Later career and death ==
Following his resignation from the federal bench, Jones served as a Judge of the Confederate District Court for the District of Alabama from 1861 to 1865. He returned to private practice in Mobile from 1866 to 1883. He died on April 1, 1883, in Mobile.

== Sources ==
Legal offices
Preceded by John Gayle	Judge of the United States District Court for the Middle District of Alabama; Judge of the United States District Court for the Northern District of Alabama; Judge of the United States District Court for the Southern District of Alabama; 1859–1861	Succeeded by George Washington Lane
