= Paul Hitch Roney =

American judge (1921–2006)

Paul Roney

Presiding Judge of the United States Foreign Intelligence Surveillance Court of Review
- In office September 13, 1994 – May 18, 2001
- Appointed by: William Rehnquist
- Preceded by: Collins J. Seitz
- Succeeded by: Ralph B. Guy Jr.

Senior Judge of the United States Court of Appeals for the Eleventh Circuit
- In office October 1, 1989 – September 16, 2006

Chief Judge of the United States Court of Appeals for the Eleventh Circuit
- In office September 3, 1986 – October 1, 1989
- Preceded by: John Cooper Godbold
- Succeeded by: Gerald Bard Tjoflat

Judge of the United States Court of Appeals for the Eleventh Circuit
- In office October 1, 1981 – October 1, 1989
- Appointed by: operation of law
- Preceded by: Seat established by 94 Stat. 1994
- Succeeded by: Rosemary Barkett

Judge of the United States Court of Appeals for the Fifth Circuit
- In office October 16, 1970 – October 1, 1981
- Appointed by: Richard Nixon
- Preceded by: G. Harrold Carswell
- Succeeded by: Seat abolished

Personal details
- Born: Paul Hitch Roney; September 5, 1921 Olney, Illinois, U.S.
- Died: September 16, 2006 (aged 85) St. Petersburg, Florida, U.S.
- Party: Republican
- Education: St. Petersburg College (AA); University of Pennsylvania (BS); Harvard Law School (LLB); University of Virginia School of Law (LLM)

Paul Hitch Roney (September 5, 1921 – September 16, 2006) was a United States circuit judge of the United States Court of Appeals for the Eleventh Circuit and the United States Court of Appeals for the Fifth Circuit.

== Education and career ==
Born in Olney, Illinois, Roney received an Associate of Arts degree from St. Petersburg Junior College in 1940. He received a Bachelor of Science degree from University of Pennsylvania, Wharton School of Business in 1942. He received a Bachelor of Laws from Harvard Law School in 1948. He received a Master of Laws from University of Virginia School of Law in 1984. He was in the United States Army as a Staff Sergeant from 1942 to 1946. He was in private practice of law in New York City, New York from 1948 to 1950. He was in private practice of law in St. Petersburg, Florida from 1950 to 1970. He was a Lecturer for Stetson College of Law in 1957 and from 1965 to 1966.

== Federal judicial service ==
Roney was nominated by President Richard Nixon on October 7, 1970, to a seat on the United States Court of Appeals for the Fifth Circuit vacated by Judge G. Harrold Carswell. He was confirmed by the United States Senate on October 13, 1970, and received his commission on October 16, 1970. Roney was reassigned by operation of law to the United States Court of Appeals for the Eleventh Circuit on October 1, 1981. He served as chief judge from 1986 to 1989. He assumed senior status on October 1, 1989. From 1994 to 2001, Roney served as Presiding Judge of the United States Foreign Intelligence Surveillance Court. His service was terminated on September 16, 2006, due to his death in St. Petersburg.

== Sources ==
- Pudlow, Jan (September 1, 2000). "Nixon era judges celebrate 30 years on the bench". The Florida Bar News, September 1, 2000.

Legal offices
Preceded by G. Harrold Carswell	Judge of the United States Court of Appeals for the Fifth Circuit; 1970–1981	Succeeded by Seat abolished
Preceded by Seat established by 94 Stat. 1994	Judge of the United States Court of Appeals for the Eleventh Circuit; 1981–1989	Succeeded by Rosemary Barkett
Preceded by John Cooper Godbold	Chief Judge of the United States Court of Appeals for the Eleventh Circuit; 1986–1989	Succeeded by Gerald Bard Tjoflat
Preceded by Collins J. Seitz	Presiding Judge of the United States Foreign Intelligence Surveillance Court of Review; 1994–2001	Succeeded by Ralph B. Guy Jr.
