= George Washington Lane =

American politician

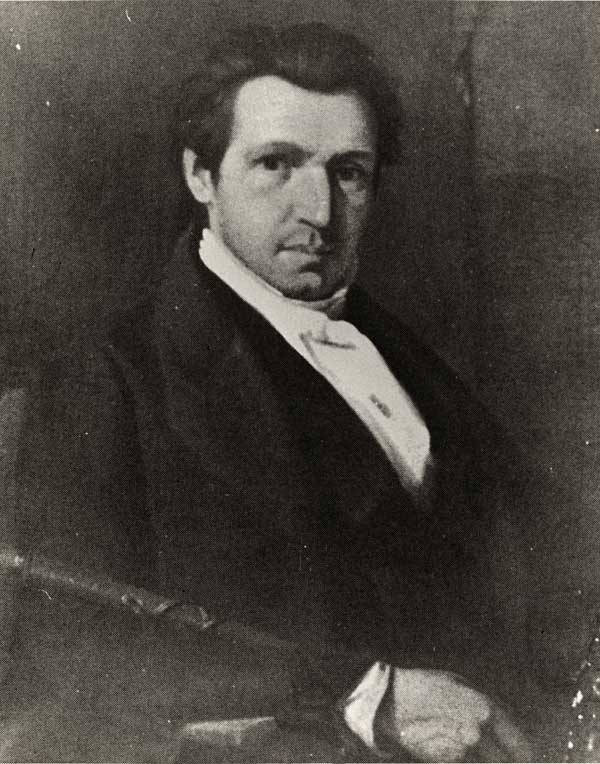

Judge of the United States District Court for the Middle District of Alabama Judge of the United States District Court for the Northern District of Alabama Judge of the United States District Court for the Southern District of Alabama
- In office March 28, 1861 – November 12, 1863
- Appointed by: Abraham Lincoln
- Preceded by: William Giles Jones
- Succeeded by: Richard Busteed

Personal details
- Born: George Washington Lane; 1806 Cherokee County, Georgia, U.S.
- Died: November 12, 1863 (aged 56–57) Louisville, Kentucky, U.S.
- Education: read law

George Washington Lane (1806 – November 12, 1863) was a United States district judge of the United States District Court for the Middle District of Alabama, the United States District Court for the Northern District of Alabama and the United States District Court for the Southern District of Alabama.

== Education and career ==
Born in Cherokee County, Georgia, Lane moved to Limestone County, Alabama with his family in 1821 and read law with Judge Daniel Coleman in Athens, Alabama to enter the bar, and practiced there until 1829. He was a member of the Alabama House of Representatives from 1829 to 1833, a County Court Judge in Alabama beginning in 1832, and a Judge of the Alabama Circuit Court from 1834 to 1846. He was in private practice in Huntsville, Alabama from 1846 to 1861. Lane opposed the secession of Alabama from the United States.

== Federal judicial service ==
Lane was nominated by President Abraham Lincoln on March 26, 1861, to a joint seat on the United States District Court for the Middle District of Alabama, the United States District Court for the Middle District of Alabama and the United States District Court for the Southern District of Alabama vacated by Judge William Giles Jones. He was confirmed by the United States Senate on March 28, 1861, and received his commission the same day. His service terminated on November 12, 1863, due to his death in Louisville, Kentucky. Lane was unable to hold court, as Alabama remained under Confederate control until well after Lane's death.

== Family and character ==
Though Lane was a strong Unionist, his son, Captain Robert W. Lane, was killed in the Confederate service in Forrest's Cavalry Corps. Historian Willis Brewer wrote of Lane that, "as a judge he was lenient but sound and reliable, and as a man he was always popular because of his kind and humane nature".

== Death ==
Lane died on November 12, 1863 in Louisville, Kentucky.

== Honors ==
Lane was inducted into the Alabama Lawyers' Hall of Fame in 2024.

== Sources ==
Legal offices
Preceded by William Giles Jones	Judge of the United States District Court for the Middle District of Alabama; Judge of the United States District Court for the Northern District of Alabama; Judge of the United States District Court for the Southern District of Alabama; 1861–1863	Succeeded by Richard Busteed
