= Richard Busteed =

American judge

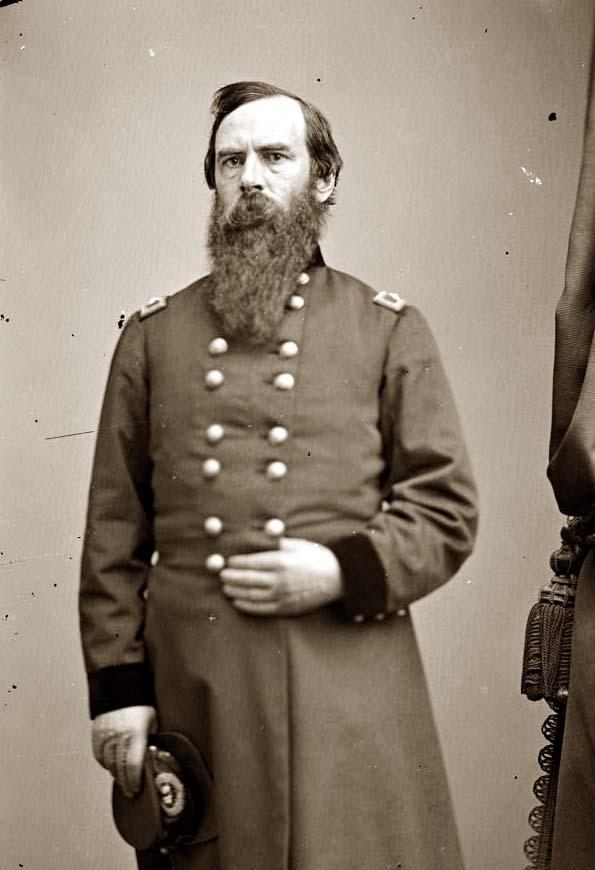
- Brigadier General Richard Busteed

Judge of the United States District Court for the Middle District of Alabama Judge of the United States District Court for the Northern District of Alabama Judge of the United States District Court for the Southern District of Alabama
- In office November 17, 1863 – October 20, 1874
- Appointed by: Abraham Lincoln
- Preceded by: George Washington Lane
- Succeeded by: John Bruce

Personal details
- Born: Richard Busteed; February 16, 1822 County Cavan, Ireland
- Died: September 14, 1898 (aged 76) New York City, US
- Resting place: Woodlawn Cemetery; The Bronx, New York
- Education: read law

Richard Busteed (February 16, 1822 – September 14, 1898) was a soldier in the Union Army during the American Civil War and a United States district judge of the United States District Court for the Middle District of Alabama, the United States District Court for the Northern District of Alabama and the United States District Court for the Southern District of Alabama.

== Education and career ==
Born on February 16, 1822, in County Cavan, Ireland, Busteed read law in 1846. He entered private practice in New York City, New York from 1846 to 1856. He was Corporation Counsel for New York City from 1856 to 1859. He was a Captain in the United States Army in 1861, and a Brigadier General from 1862 to 1863, during the American Civil War.

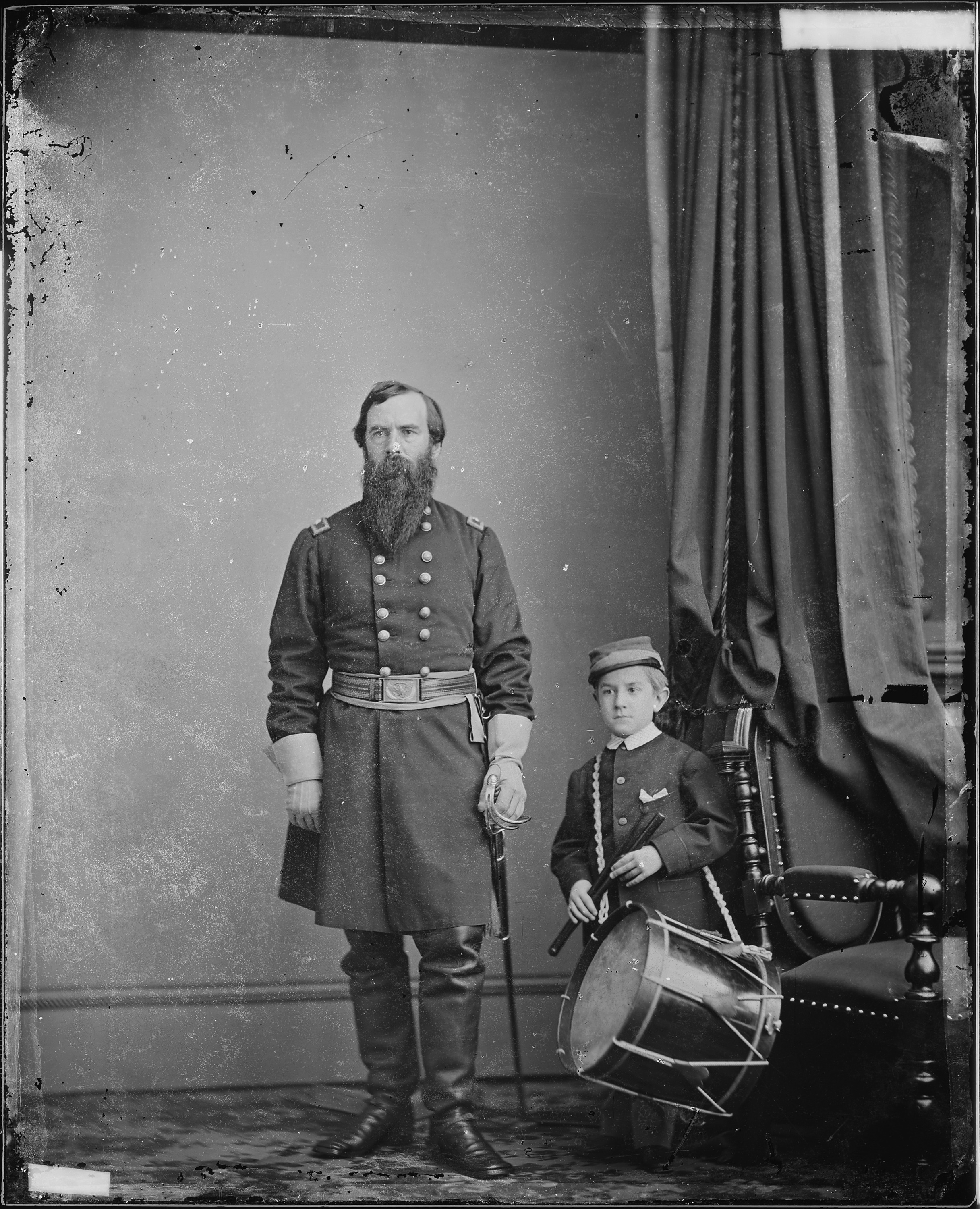
Gen. Richard Busteed and drummer boy

=== Incident ===
Once when confronted with black men being thrown out of a white railroad car by the conductor, Busteed pulled his pistol and defended the black men allowing them to stay.

== Federal judicial service ==
Busteed received a recess appointment from President Abraham Lincoln on November 17, 1863, to a joint seat on the United States District Court for the Middle District of Alabama, the United States District Court for the Northern District of Alabama and the United States District Court for the Southern District of Alabama vacated by Judge George Washington Lane. He was nominated to the same position by President Lincoln on January 5, 1864. He was confirmed by the United States Senate on January 20, 1864, and received his commission the same day. His service terminated on October 20, 1874, due to his resignation.

=== Judicial image and assassination attempt ===
Alabamians generally considered Busteed corrupt and pro-Northern. In December 1867, he was shot on the street in Mobile, Alabama by United States Attorney Lucien V. B. Martin, who fired two more shots into him after he fell. Martin went to Texas and was never prosecuted, while Busteed recovered rapidly.

=== Abortive nomination to the Supreme Court of the District of Columbia ===
Busteed was nominated by President Ulysses S. Grant to the Supreme Court of the District of Columbia (now the United States District Court for the District of Columbia) on January 13, 1873. At the same time, President Grant nominated Judge David Campbell Humphreys, an Alabama native serving on the Supreme Court of the District of Columbia, to assume Busteed's seat, each nomination made contingent on the other's resignation. The Senate returned the nominations to the President as irregular in form on February 13, 1873.

=== Impeachment inquiry and resignation ===
In 1873, Busteed was the subject of an impeachment inquiry by the United States House of Representatives Judiciary Committee. The Committee recommended his impeachment on charges of failing to maintain a residence in his judicial district, failing to hold scheduled terms of court, and using his official position to promote his personal interests (specifically, by remitting a fine due to the Federal government in order to obtain release from a personal judgment against him in a State court). Busteed resigned before the full House could vote on the recommendation. Representatives Butler and Wilson emphasized the revived (previously settled by Blount in 1799) but still-minority position that resignation was no bar to later impeachment, yet voted with the rest of the committee to terminate proceedings.

== Later career and death ==
Following his resignation from the federal bench, Busteed resumed private practice in New York City starting in 1874. He died on September 14, 1898, at the Home for Incurables in New York City's Fordham neighborhood.

== See also ==
- List of American Civil War generals (Union)

== Sources ==
- Gen Busteed at Picture History
- Obituary in The New York Times

Legal offices
Preceded by George Washington Lane	Judge of the United States District Court for the Middle District of Alabama; Judge of the United States District Court for the Northern District of Alabama; Judge of the United States District Court for the Southern District of Alabama; 1863–1874	Succeeded by John Bruce
