= Emmett Ripley Cox =

American judge (1935–2021)

Senior Judge of the United States Court of Appeals for the Eleventh Circuit
- In office December 18, 2000 – March 3, 2021

Judge of the United States Court of Appeals for the Eleventh Circuit
- In office April 18, 1988 – December 18, 2000
- Appointed by: Ronald Reagan
- Preceded by: John Cooper Godbold
- Succeeded by: William H. Pryor Jr.

Judge of the United States District Court for the Southern District of Alabama
- In office November 18, 1981 – April 25, 1988
- Appointed by: Ronald Reagan
- Preceded by: Thomas Virgil Pittman
- Succeeded by: Charles R. Butler Jr.

Personal details
- Born: Emmett Ripley Cox; February 13, 1935 Cottonwood, Alabama, U.S.
- Died: March 3, 2021 (aged 86) Daphne, Alabama, U.S.
- Education: University of Alabama (BA); University of Alabama School of Law (LLB)

Emmett Ripley Cox (February 13, 1935 – March 3, 2021) was an American jurist who served as judge of the United States Court of Appeals for the Eleventh Circuit and the United States District Court for the Southern District of Alabama.

== Education and career ==
Born in Cottonwood, Alabama, Cox received an Artium Baccalaureus degree from the University of Alabama in 1957 and a Bachelor of Laws from the University of Alabama School of Law in 1959. He was in the United States Air National Guard from 1958 to 1964, and was in private practice in Birmingham, Alabama from 1959 to 1964, and in Mobile, Alabama from 1964 to 1981.

== Federal judicial service ==
On October 14, 1981, Cox was nominated by President Ronald Reagan to a seat on the United States District Court for the Southern District of Alabama vacated by Judge Thomas Virgil Pittman. Cox was confirmed by the United States Senate on November 18, 1981, and received his commission the same day. His service terminated on April 25, 1988, due to elevation to the court of appeals.

On December 19, 1987, Reagan nominated Cox to a seat on the United States Court of Appeals for the Eleventh Circuit vacated by Judge John Cooper Godbold. Cox was again confirmed by the Senate, on April 15, 1988, and received his commission on April 18, 1988. He assumed senior status on December 18, 2000. He died on March 3, 2021, aged 86.

== Sources ==
Legal offices
Preceded by Thomas Virgil Pittman	Judge of the United States District Court for the Southern District of Alabama; 1981–1988	Succeeded by Charles R. Butler Jr.
Preceded by John Cooper Godbold	Judge of the United States Court of Appeals for the Eleventh Circuit; 1988–2000	Succeeded by William H. Pryor Jr.
