= Alex T. Howard Jr. =

American judge

Senior Judge of the United States District Court for the Southern District of Alabama
- In office October 21, 1996 – February 10, 2011

Chief Judge of the United States District Court for the Southern District of Alabama
- In office 1989–1994
- Preceded by: William Brevard Hand
- Succeeded by: Charles R. Butler Jr.

Judge of the United States District Court for the Southern District of Alabama
- In office October 14, 1986 – October 21, 1996
- Appointed by: Ronald Reagan
- Preceded by: Seat established by 98 Stat. 333
- Succeeded by: Callie V. Granade

Personal details
- Born: Alexander Travis Howard Jr. July 9, 1924 Mobile, Alabama, US
- Died: February 10, 2011 (aged 86) Mobile, Alabama, US
- Education: Vanderbilt University Law School (LL.B.)

Alexander Travis Howard Jr. (July 9, 1924 – February 10, 2011) was a United States district judge of the United States District Court for the Southern District of Alabama.

== Education and career ==
Born in Mobile, Alabama, Howard was in the United States Army during World War II, from 1943 to 1946, and then received a Bachelor of Laws from Vanderbilt University Law School in 1950. He was a United States Probation Officer from 1950 to 1951, and was in private practice in Mobile from 1951 to 1986. He was a Commissioner for the United States District Court for the Southern District of Alabama from 1956 to 1970.

== Federal judicial service ==
On September 23, 1986, Howard was nominated by President Ronald Reagan to a new seat on the United States District Court for the Southern District of Alabama created by 98 Stat. 333. He was confirmed by the United States Senate on October 8, 1986 and received his commission on October 14, 1986. He served as Chief Judge from 1989 to 1994, assuming senior status on October 21, 1996. Howard died in Mobile and was buried at Pine Crest Cemetery.

== Notable case ==
He presided over the Southern Poverty Law Center vs United Klans of America civil trial when an all-white jury ordered the Klan to pay $7 million to the family of a young black man who was lynched in Mobile in 1981.

Legal offices
Preceded by Seat established by 98 Stat. 333	Judge of the United States District Court for the Southern District of Alabama; 1986–1996	Succeeded by Callie V. Granade
Preceded by William Brevard Hand	Chief Judge of the United States District Court for the Southern District of Alabama; 1989–1994	Succeeded by Charles Randolph Butler Jr.
