= William H. Steele (judge) =

American judge (born 1951)

William Howard Steele

Senior judge of the United States District Court for the Southern District of Alabama
- Incumbent
- Assumed office June 8, 2017

Chief Judge of the United States District Court for the Southern District of Alabama
- In office 2010–2017
- Preceded by: Callie V. Granade
- Succeeded by: Kristi DuBose

Judge of the United States District Court for the Southern District of Alabama
- In office March 14, 2003 – June 8, 2017
- Appointed by: George W. Bush
- Preceded by: Richard W. Vollmer Jr.
- Succeeded by: Terry F. Moorer

Magistrate Judge of the United States District Court for the Southern District of Alabama
- In office 1990–2003

Personal details
- Born: William Howard Steele; June 8, 1951 (age 74) Tuscumbia, Alabama, U.S.
- Education: University of Southern Mississippi (BA); University of Alabama School of Law (JD)

William Howard Steele (born June 8, 1951) is a senior United States district judge of the United States District Court for the Southern District of Alabama.

== Education and career ==
Steele was born in 1951 in Tuscumbia, Alabama. After graduating summa cum laude from the University of Southern Mississippi with a Bachelor of Arts degree in 1972, Steele served in the U.S. Marine Corps as an officer, pilot, and instructor pilot. During his service in the Marine Corps, Steele participated in the operation to evacuate American citizens from Lebanon in 1976. He later served in the Alabama National Guard as a pilot and as commanding officer of an assault helicopter company.

After his service in the Marine Corps, Steele attended the University of Alabama School of Law, receiving a Juris Doctor. After law school, he was employed for six years as assistant and chief assistant district attorney in Mobile, Alabama. In that capacity, he litigated over 100 jury trials, and co-founded the Child Advocacy Center, an agency devoted to identifying and providing assistance to child victims of physical and sexual violence. In 1987, he was hired as an Assistant United States Attorney by U.S. Attorney and future U.S. Senator, Jeff Sessions. He held that position for two years before engaging in the private practice of law.

== Federal judicial service ==
Steele served as a United States magistrate judge for the Southern District of Alabama from 1990 to 2003.

Steele was nominated by President George W. Bush on January 7, 2003, to a seat on the United States District Court for the Southern District of Alabama vacated by Judge Richard W. Vollmer Jr. He was confirmed by the United States Senate on March 13, 2003, and received commission on March 14, 2003. He served as Chief Judge from 2010 to 2017. He assumed senior status on June 8, 2017.

Legal offices
| Preceded by Richard W. Vollmer Jr. | Judge of the United States District Court for the Southern District of Alabama; 2003–2017 | Succeeded by Terry F. Moorer |
| Preceded by Callie V. Granade | Chief Judge of the United States District Court for the Southern District of Alabama; 2010–2017 | Succeeded by Kristi DuBose |
