= John Cooper Godbold =

American judge (1920–2009)

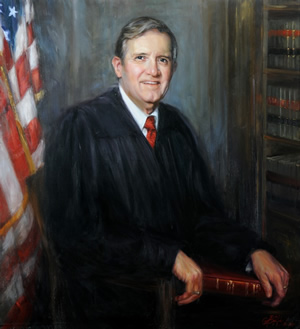

Senior Judge of the United States Court of Appeals for the Eleventh Circuit
- In office October 23, 1987 – December 22, 2009

Chief Judge of the United States Court of Appeals for the Eleventh Circuit
- In office October 1, 1981 – September 3, 1986
- Preceded by: Office established
- Succeeded by: Paul Hitch Roney

Judge of the United States Court of Appeals for the Eleventh Circuit
- In office October 1, 1981 – October 23, 1987
- Appointed by: operation of law
- Preceded by: Seat established by 94 Stat. 1994
- Succeeded by: Emmett Ripley Cox

Chief Judge of the United States Court of Appeals for the Fifth Circuit
- In office February 2, 1981 – October 1, 1981
- Preceded by: James P. Coleman
- Succeeded by: Charles Clark

Judge of the United States Court of Appeals for the Fifth Circuit
- In office July 22, 1966 – October 1, 1981
- Appointed by: Lyndon B. Johnson
- Preceded by: Richard Rives
- Succeeded by: Seat abolished

Personal details
- Born: John Cooper Godbold; March 4, 1920 Coy, Alabama, U.S.
- Died: December 22, 2009 (aged 89) Montgomery, Alabama, U.S.
- Education: Auburn University (BS); Harvard Law School (JD)

John Cooper Godbold (March 24, 1920 – December 22, 2009) was a United States circuit judge of the United States Court of Appeals for the Eleventh Circuit and the United States Court of Appeals for the Fifth Circuit.

== Education and career ==
Born in Coy, Alabama, Godbold received a Bachelor of Science degree from Auburn University in 1940 and was a Major in the United States Army, Division Artillery Headquarters during World War II, from 1941 to 1946. He received a Juris Doctor from Harvard Law School in 1948, and was in private practice in Montgomery, Alabama from 1948 to 1966.

== Federal judicial service ==
Godbold was nominated by President Lyndon B. Johnson on June 28, 1966, to a seat on the United States Court of Appeals for the Fifth Circuit vacated by Judge Richard Rives. He was confirmed by the United States Senate on July 22, 1966, and received his commission the same day. He served as a board member of the Federal Judicial Center from 1976 to 1981. He served as Chief Judge from February 2, 1981, until he was reassigned by operation of law to the newly formed United States Court of Appeals for the Eleventh Circuit on October 1, 1981. He then served as its Chief Judge until September 3, 1986, when he stepped down several days before Judge Paul Hitch Roney's eligibility for the chief judgeship was set to expire. He assumed senior status on October 23, 1987. He was Director of the Federal Judicial Center from 1987 to 1990. His service terminated on December 22, 2009, due to his death in Montgomery.

== Other service ==
Concurrent with his federal judicial service, Godbold was a professor of law at the Cumberland School of Law at Samford University from 1990 until his death.

== See also ==
- List of United States federal judges by longevity of service

== Sources ==
Legal offices
Preceded by Richard Rives	Judge of the United States Court of Appeals for the Fifth Circuit; 1966–1981	Succeeded by Seat abolished
Preceded by James P. Coleman	Chief Judge of the United States Court of Appeals for the Fifth Circuit; 1981	Succeeded by Charles Clark
Preceded by Seat established by 94 Stat. 1994	Judge of the United States Court of Appeals for the Eleventh Circuit; 1981–1987	Succeeded by Emmett Ripley Cox
Preceded by Office established	Chief Judge of the United States Court of Appeals for the Eleventh Circuit; 1981–1986	Succeeded by Paul Hitch Roney
