= Richard Rives =

American lawyer and judge (1895-1982)

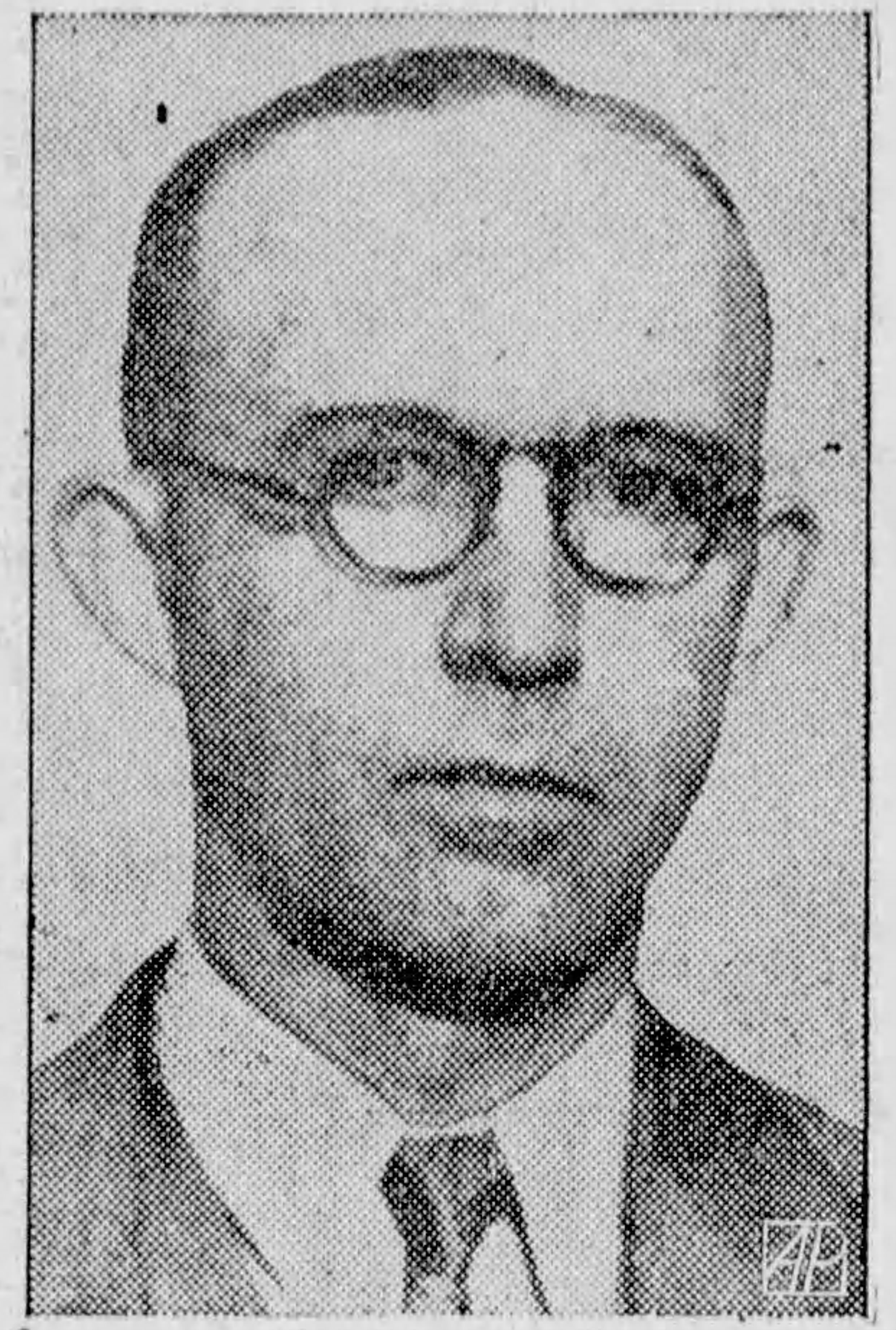
- Richard Rives in 1941

Senior Judge of the United States Court of Appeals for the Eleventh Circuit
- In office October 1, 1981 – October 27, 1982

Senior Judge of the United States Court of Appeals for the Fifth Circuit
- In office February 15, 1966 – October 1, 1981

Chief Judge of the United States Court of Appeals for the Fifth Circuit
- In office 1959–1960
- Preceded by: Joseph Chappell Hutcheson Jr.
- Succeeded by: Elbert Tuttle

Judge of the United States Court of Appeals for the Fifth Circuit
- In office May 3, 1951 – February 15, 1966
- Appointed by: Harry S. Truman
- Preceded by: Leon Clarence McCord
- Succeeded by: John Cooper Godbold

Personal details
- Born: Richard Taylor Rives; January 15, 1895 Montgomery, Alabama, US
- Died: October 27, 1982 (aged 87) Montgomery, Alabama, US
- Party: Democratic
- Relatives: Callie V. Granade
- Education: Tulane University; Reading law

Richard Taylor Rives (January 15, 1895 – October 27, 1982) was an American lawyer and judge. A native of Alabama, he was the sole Democrat among the "Fifth Circuit Four," four United States circuit judges of the United States Court of Appeals for the Fifth Circuit in the 1950s and 1960s that issued a series of decisions crucial in advancing the civil and political rights of African-Americans. At that time, the Fifth Circuit included not only Louisiana, Mississippi, and Texas (its current jurisdiction), but also Alabama, Georgia, and Florida (which were subsequently split off into the United States Court of Appeals for the Eleventh Circuit), and the Panama Canal Zone.

== Ancestry ==
He is a descendant of Robert Ryves (Reve) of Dorset.

== Early and family life ==
Born in Montgomery, Montgomery County, Alabama, on January 15, 1895, to William Henry Rives (1854-1922) and his wife, the former Alice Bloodworth Taylor (1856-1943), Rives had five siblings. A maternal great-great-grandfather had served as the first Baptist minister in Montgomery. Three of his great-great-great-great grandfathers had served in the American Revolutionary War: Captain William Sanford (1734-1806) had carried dispatches to France before settling in Georgia, Major John Mason (1716-1785) had acted as Justice of Sussex County, Virginia during that time, and Private James McLemore (1718-1800) had also served the Revolutionary cause in Granville County, North Carolina. Both sides of his family had operated large plantations using enslaved labor before the American Civil War.

Rives attended the Sidney Lanier High School in Montgomery and graduated as valedictorian of his class. He then won a tuition scholarship and began studies at Tulane University in New Orleans, Louisiana. However, Rives also had to borrow money for living expenses from his sister, so he withdrew from the university after a year and began working for Wiley Hill, an attorney practicing in Montgomery whose family plantation had shared a border with the Rives' plantation before the American Civil War. Rives would later receive honorary degrees from the University of Notre Dame in 1966 and Cumberland Law School at Samford University in 1975.

== Early career, military service and family life ==
After reading law, Rives passed the Alabama bar examination in 1914 at 19 years old. He was in private practice in Montgomery, Alabama, from 1914 to 1916. During World War I, Rives joined the Alabama National Guard, then served in the United States Army (1916 to 1919; commissioned a first lieutenant in 1917). While stationed in Macon, Georgia, Rives met Jessie H. Daugherty. They married soon after he left the Army, and would have four children, although two died as infants. Rives's relationship with his son and namesake Richard Rives Jr. (1922-1949) would later greatly affect his attitudes toward racial discrimination. His son had attended the University of Exeter in England and Harvard University in Massachusetts, then become severely ill while serving in the Pacific theater during World War II. Based on his own reading and discussions with African American soldiers hospitalized with him, the younger Rives determined to confront issues involved in what many Southerners called "the race question." He also went to the University of Michigan Law school, advised his father to read Gunnar Myrdal's treatise and planned to join the family law firm, but died in an auto accident in 1949. After his wife's death in 1973, Rives in 1976 married Martha Blake Thigpen Frazer, but they had no children.

== Career ==
In 1919 Rives returned to private practice in Montgomery after his World War I service, and became involved in politics and the Democratic Party during the New Deal. He directed the 1942 gubernatorial campaign of Bibb Graves, who died before the election. Rives served as president of both the Montgomery County and state bar associations. In 1951, he successfully appeared before the United States Supreme Court on behalf of the Alabama Public Service Commission, and the court reversed a lower federal court's ruling that had allowed the Southern Railway Company to discontinue much local service in the state, deciding such was a state rather than federal matter. He was a close friend of United States Senator then Supreme Court Justice Hugo Black, as well as of Alabama Senators John Sparkman and Lister Hill.

== Federal judicial service ==
Rives was nominated by President Harry S. Truman on April 12, 1951, to a seat on the United States Court of Appeals for the Fifth Circuit vacated by Judge Leon Clarence McCord. He was confirmed by the United States Senate on May 1, 1951, and received his commission on May 3, 1951. He served as Chief Judge and as a member of the Judicial Conference of the United States from 1959 to 1960. He assumed senior status on February 15, 1966. Rives was reassigned by operation of law to the United States Court of Appeals for the Eleventh Circuit on October 1, 1981, pursuant to 94 Stat. 1994. His service terminated on October 27, 1982, due to his death.

=== Civil rights cases ===
The Fifth Circuit supervised federal district judges in six southern states. By the time of the United States Supreme Court rulings concerning desegregation in Brown v. Board of Education, the other "Fifth Circuit Four" judges had all been appointed by Republican President Dwight Eisenhower: Elbert P. Tuttle of Atlanta, Georgia, John Minor Wisdom of New Orleans, Louisiana, and John Robert Brown of Houston, Texas. All shared a quiet passion against injustice. Rives and his colleagues became actively involved in racial desegregation after state officials became involved in Massive Resistance. He also became involved in cases concerning bus desegregation, legislative redistricting and jury selection.

== Death and legacy ==
Rives died at home in Montgomery, age 87 on October 27, 1982, after a long illness.

Rives' granddaughter, United States District Judge Callie V. Granade, of the Southern District of Alabama. Granade struck down Alabama's prohibition on same-sex marriage, a decision eventually affirmed by the United States Supreme Court.

Rives was inducted into the Alabama Lawyers' Hall of Fame in 2022.

Legal offices
Preceded by Leon Clarence McCord	Judge of the United States Court of Appeals for the Fifth Circuit; 1951–1966	Succeeded by John Cooper Godbold
Preceded by Joseph Chappell Hutcheson Jr.	Chief Judge of the United States Court of Appeals for the Fifth Circuit; 1959–1960	Succeeded by Elbert Tuttle
