= William H. Pryor Jr. =

American judge (born 1962)

Bill Pryor
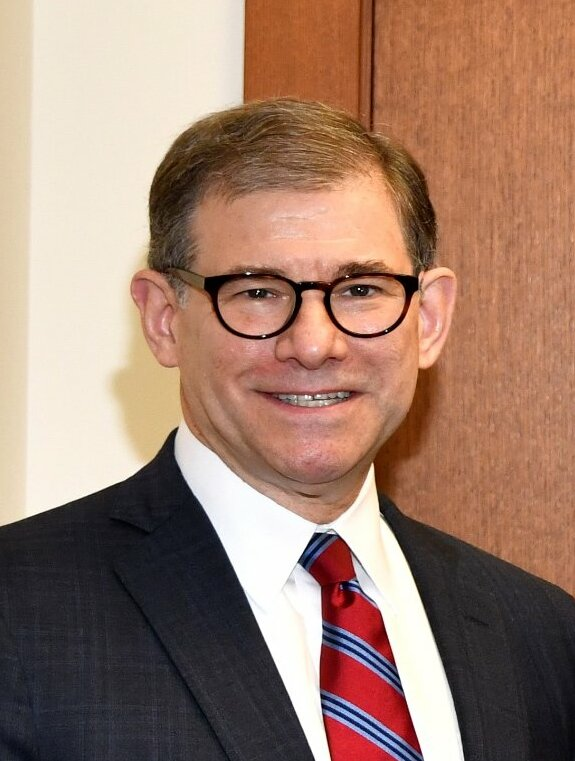
- Pryor in 2022

Chief Judge of the United States Court of Appeals for the Eleventh Circuit
- Incumbent
- Assumed office June 3, 2020
- Preceded by: Edward Earl Carnes

Judge of the United States Court of Appeals for the Eleventh Circuit
- Incumbent
- Assumed office February 20, 2004
- Appointed by: George W. Bush
- Preceded by: Emmett Ripley Cox

Chair of the United States Sentencing Commission
- Acting; January 3, 2017 – December 2018
- President: Barack Obama; Donald Trump
- Preceded by: Patti B. Saris
- Succeeded by: Charles Breyer (acting)

45th Attorney General of Alabama
- In office January 3, 1997 – February 20, 2004
- Governor: Fob James; Don Siegelman; Bob Riley
- Preceded by: Jeff Sessions
- Succeeded by: Troy King

Personal details
- Born: William Holcombe Pryor Jr. 1962 (age 63–64) Mobile, Alabama, U.S.
- Party: Republican
- Education: Northeast Louisiana University (BA); Tulane University (JD)

William Holcombe Pryor Jr. (born 1962) is an American lawyer who has served as the chief judge of the United States Court of Appeals for the Eleventh Circuit since 2020. He was appointed as a United States circuit judge of the court by President George W. Bush in 2004. He is a former commissioner of the United States Sentencing Commission. Previously, he was the Attorney General of Alabama from 1997 to 2004.

== Early life and education ==
Pryor was born in 1962 in Mobile, Alabama, the son of William Holcombe Pryor and Laura Louise Bowles. Pryor was raised in a devoutly Roman Catholic family. He and his siblings attended McGill–Toolen Catholic High School in Mobile.

Pryor attended Northeast Louisiana University (now University of Louisiana at Monroe) on a band scholarship, graduating in 1984 with a Bachelor of Arts, magna cum laude. He then attended Tulane University Law School, where he was editor-in-chief of the Tulane Law Review. He graduated in 1987 with a Juris Doctor, magna cum laude.

== Legal career ==
After law school, Pryor served as a law clerk to judge John Minor Wisdom of the U.S. Court of Appeals for the Fifth Circuit from 1987 to 1988. He then entered private practice with the Birmingham, Alabama, law firm Cabaniss, Johnston, Gardner, Dumas & O'Neal. He also served as an adjunct professor of maritime law at the Cumberland School of Law at Samford University from 1989 to 1995. Pryor is currently a visiting professor at the University of Alabama School of Law and an adjunct professor at the Cumberland School of Law at Samford University.

== Political career ==
In 1994, Pryor was introduced to Jeff Sessions, who was then campaigning to become Attorney General of Alabama. Sessions won, and from 1995 to 1997 Pryor served as Alabama's deputy attorney general. When Sessions became a U.S. Senator in 1997, Alabama Governor Fob James made Pryor the state's Attorney General. He was, at that time, the youngest state attorney general in the United States. Pryor was elected in 1998 and reelected in 2002. At reelection, Pryor received nearly 59% of the vote, the highest percentage of any statewide candidate.

Pryor received national attention in 2003 when he reluctantly called for the removal of Alabama Supreme Court Chief Justice Roy Moore, who had disobeyed a federal court order to remove a Ten Commandments monument from the Alabama judicial building. Pryor said that although he agreed with the propriety of displaying the Ten Commandments in a courthouse, he was bound to follow the court order and uphold the rule of law. Pryor personally prosecuted Moore for violations of the canons of judicial ethics, and the Alabama Court of the Judiciary unanimously removed Moore from office.

Pryor was criticized for his refusal to reopen the case of Anthony Ray Hinton, an Alabama man whose 1985 conviction was vacated in 2015. In 2014, the United States Supreme Court held that Hinton's trial lawyer was "constitutionally deficient" because he failed to research how much money he could obtain for an expert witness. The expert that Hinton's lawyer obtained on the cheap was insufficiently qualified. Hinton was released on April 3, 2015, after the State of Alabama could not gather enough evidence for a retrial. In 2002, Pryor opposed Hinton's attempts to challenge his conviction, stating that Hinton's new experts "did not prove [his] innocence and the state does not doubt his guilt."

== Federal judicial service ==
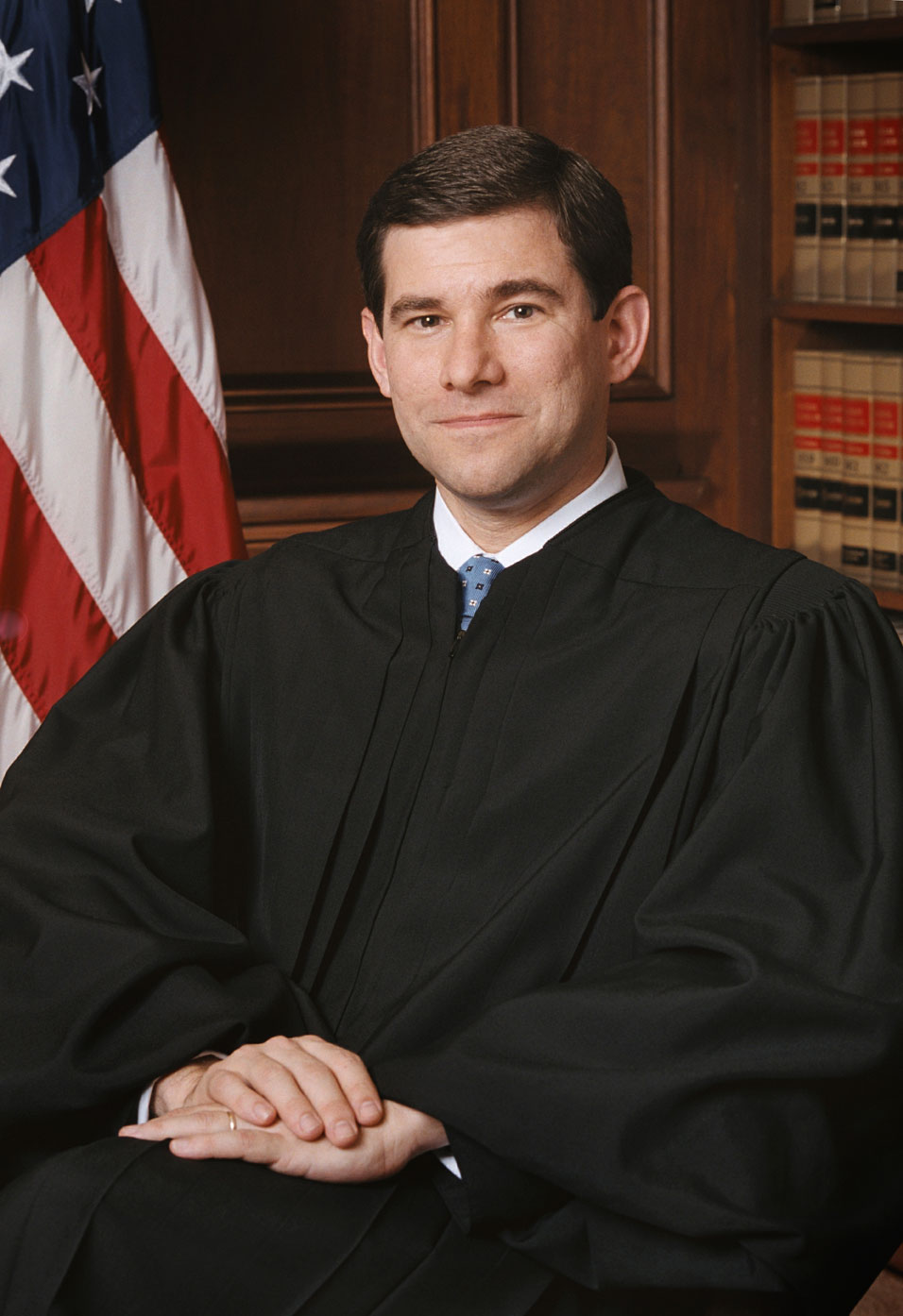
Pryor's official portrait, c. 2004.

=== Eleventh Circuit nomination and confirmation ===
Pryor was nominated to the United States Court of Appeals for the Eleventh Circuit by president George W. Bush on April 9, 2003, to fill a seat vacated by judge Emmett Ripley Cox, who had assumed senior status. Originally, William H. Steele had been nominated to the seat in 2001, but his nomination had become stalled in the Democratic-controlled Senate Judiciary Committee during the 107th United States Congress because African-American groups protested his decisions in two civil rights cases as a magistrate judge. His nomination was withdrawn in January 2003. Pryor was nominated as Steele's replacement.

Despite the fact that the 108th United States Congress was controlled by the Republican Party, Senate Democrats refused to allow Pryor to be confirmed, criticizing him as an extremist, citing statements he had made such as referring to the Supreme Court as "nine octogenarian lawyers" and saying that Roe v. Wade was the "worst abomination in the history of constitutional law."

During the confirmation hearing, Pryor was criticized in particular for filing an amicus brief in 2003 on behalf of the state of Alabama in the U.S. Supreme Court case of Lawrence v. Texas that urged the Court to uphold Texas penal code § 21.06, which classifies homosexual sex as a misdemeanor. Pryor wrote in the brief that "this Court has never recognized a fundamental right to engage in sexual activity outside of monogamous heterosexual marriage, let alone to engage in homosexual sodomy," further arguing that the recognition of a constitutional right to sodomy would "logically extend" to activities like "prostitution, adultery, necrophilia, bestiality, incest and pedophilia."

Due to a filibuster of his nomination, George W. Bush installed Pryor as a circuit court judge on February 20, 2004, using a recess appointment to bypass the regular Senate confirmation process. Pryor resigned as Alabama's attorney general that same day and took his judicial oath for a term lasting until the end of the first session of the 109th Congress (December 22, 2005), when his appointment would have ended had he not been eventually confirmed.

On May 23, 2005, senator John McCain announced an agreement between seven Republican and seven Democratic U.S. senators, the Gang of 14, to ensure an up-or-down vote on Pryor and two other stalled Bush nominees, Priscilla Owen and Janice Rogers Brown. On June 9, 2005, Pryor was confirmed to the Eleventh Circuit by a 53–45 vote.

Pryor received his commission on June 10, 2005. On June 20, 2005, he was sworn in at the age of 43.

=== Sentencing commission service ===
President Barack Obama nominated Pryor to serve as a commissioner on the United States Sentencing Commission on April 15, 2013. Pryor had experience with sentencing issues and reform at the state level.

During his tenure as attorney general of Alabama, he successfully led the effort to establish, by legislation, the Alabama sentencing commission. Pryor has written several law review articles about his experiences with sentencing reform. The Senate unanimously confirmed Pryor by voice vote on June 6, 2013, and he served a term that expired on October 31, 2017. On January 3, 2017, Pryor was named the Acting Chair of the Commission. Pryor continued to serve as an active judge on the Eleventh Circuit during his service on the Commission.

=== Misconduct investigation ===
In January 2022, the United States Court of Appeals for the Second Circuit threw out a complaint against Pryor and a District Court Judge, Corey Maze, for their hiring of Crystal Clanton. The complaint alleged that Pryor hired Clanton despite knowledge of reports that she had sent multiple racist texts to colleagues in her student group, Turning Point USA, including one reading "I hate Black People." After working at Turning Point USA, Clanton had lived with Supreme Court Justice Clarence Thomas and his wife, who wrote a letter to the Second Circuit stating that "She is a good and decent young woman who has had to overcome some challenging difficulties in life only to be smeared by others who would collapse if this happened to their own children.”

On July 8, 2022, the Judicial Conference's Committee on Judicial Conduct and Disability sent the case back to the Second Circuit, writing that "[b]ecause a special committee was not appointed to investigate the complaints, there is not enough information in the record to determine how the matter should be concluded." The case was sent back with instructions to "[a]t a minimum ... attempt to interview the candidate and the witnesses identified in the media reports." But on October 31, 2023, the Second Circuit unanimously declined to disturb its earlier decision. Based on guidance that it received from the Executive Committee of the Judicial Conference of the United States, the Second Circuit ruled that its original decision dismissing the complaint against Pryor and Maze was "final and conclusive."

=== Notable opinions ===
- Georgia v. Meadows (11th Cir. 2023). Pryor was part of a panel that denied the appeal of Mark Meadows, to remove his case from state court to federal court.
- Trump v. United States (11th Cir. 2022). Pryor was part of a panel that issued a per curiam opinion vacating U.S. District Judge Aileen M. Cannon's September 5 Order in the Mar-a-Lago documents case. The opinion held that the district court's exercise of equitable jurisdiction constituted an abuse of discretion and accordingly remanded the matter with instructions for the district court to dismiss the case. In doing so, the opinion rejected the notion that the execution of a search warrant at the home of a former president is sufficient to warrant an exercise of equitable jurisdiction.
- Jones v. Governor of Florida (11th Cir. 2020). Pryor wrote for the six member en banc majority when it found that it was constitutional to impose financial obligations upon felon reenfranchisment. The court held the statute, which restricted voting rights granted by the 2018 Florida Amendment 4 ballot initiative, did not violate the Fourteenth Amendment because felons do not have a fundamental right to vote and that it did not violate the Twenty-fourth Amendment because the fees were not a poll tax.
- United States v. Phillips (11th Cir. 2016). Pryor wrote an opinion for a unanimous panel, affirming the denial of Ted Phillips's motion to suppress. The police caught Phillips, a convicted felon, with a firearm while they were arresting him on a civil writ of bodily attachment for his failure to pay child support. The Court's opinion explored the original meaning of the Fourth Amendment and the history of civil writs to conclude that the writ for unpaid child support gave the police the authority to arrest Phillips and to conduct a search incident to arrest.
- In Alabama Legislative Black Caucus v. Alabama (2015), the Supreme Court, by a vote of 5–4, vacated a three-judge district court opinion by Pryor which had rejected the plaintiff's racial gerrymandering claims.
- In November 2014, Pryor wrote for the en banc circuit when it found, by a vote of 5–4, that an inmate who is no longer classified as a career offender nevertheless cannot seek a sentencing reduction.
- Eternal Word Television Network, Inc. v. Sec'y, U.S. Dept. of Health & Human Services. (11th Cir. 2014). In a unanimous order, a panel of the Eleventh Circuit enjoined the Secretary of HHS from enforcing the contraception mandate against Catholic television network EWTN. Judge Pryor specially concurred, explaining why, in light of the Supreme Court's decision in Hobby Lobby, EWTN had shown a substantial likelihood of success on the merits under the Religious Freedom Restoration Act. The concurrence is particularly notable because Judge Pryor noted that he parted ways with decisions of the Sixth and Seventh Circuits on the subject "because the decisions of those courts are wholly unpersuasive."
- Walker v. R.J. Reynolds Tobacco Co. (11th Cir. 2013). On behalf of a unanimous panel, Pryor rejected the due process challenge brought by R.J. Reynolds to the application, as res judicata, of the previous determinations on liability made by a Florida jury in an unorthodox class action against the tobacco companies in the 1990s. The panel concluded that it was required to give full faith and credit to the decision of the Florida trial court, as interpreted by the Florida Supreme Court, and that the application of full faith and credit did not violate the tobacco company's due process rights because R.J. Reynolds had been given notice and an opportunity to be heard throughout the litigation. The opinion is particularly notable for a colorful paragraph at its conclusion discussing the intractable problem of tobacco litigation.
- Day v. Persels & Associates (11th Cir. 2013). Pryor wrote the majority (2–1) opinion vacating a settlement award in a class action relating to debt-settlement services. The court concluded that the magistrate judge had subject-matter jurisdiction to approve the settlement because unnamed class members are not parties whose consent is required for adjudication by a magistrate judge. But the court also concluded that the magistrate judge had abused his discretion when it approved a settlement that provided no monetary relief to the class members because he found that the defendants could not pay such monetary relief, but no evidence supported that finding.
- United States v. Bellaizac-Hurtado (11th Cir. 2012). Pryor wrote the majority (2–1) opinion reversing the convictions of four defendants for drug-trafficking in the territorial waters of Panama because the Act that criminalized their behavior exceeded the authority of Congress under the Offences against the Law of Nations Clause of the Constitution. The opinion is the first in-depth interpretation of the constitutional provision by a federal circuit court. Judge Rosemary Barkett specially concurred in the judgment.
- Glenn v. Brumby (11th Cir. 2011). Pryor joined a unanimous panel decision that held that "discriminating against someone on the basis of his or her gender non-conformity constitutes sex-based discrimination under the Equal Protection Clause."
- United States v. Shaygan (11th Cir. 2011). Pryor wrote the majority (2–1) opinion vacating an award of over $600,000 in attorney's fees and costs against the United States and the public reprimand of two federal prosecutors. The court explained that the prosecution was objectively reasonable and did not warrant sanctions under the Hyde Amendment. The court also concluded that the district court had violated the due process rights of the federal prosecutors when it denied them notice of the charges and an opportunity to be heard. Pryor later wrote a statement respecting the denial of rehearing en banc of this opinion in United States v. Shaygan (11th Cir. April 10, 2012).
- First Vagabonds Church of God v. Orlando (11th Cir. 2011). Writing for a unanimous en banc court, Pryor rejected an as-applied challenge by Orlando Food Not Bombs to a municipal ordinance that restricted the frequency of its feedings of homeless persons in parks located within a 2-mile radius of the Orlando City Hall. The court assumed, without deciding, that the feeding of homeless persons constituted expressive conduct and determined that the ordinance, as applied to Orlando Food Not Bombs, constituted a reasonable time, place, or manner restriction and a reasonable regulation of expressive conduct.
- In re United States (11th Cir. 2010). Pryor wrote the majority (2–1) opinion granting a writ of mandamus to substitute an Assistant Administrator of the EPA for the appearance of the Administrator in a case about the ecology of the Everglades. The panel explained that the district court had abused its discretion in ordering the appearance of the agency head and encroached on the separation of powers.
- Scott v. Roberts (11th Cir. 2010). Pryor wrote for a unanimous panel reversing the district court and preliminarily restraining the enforcement of a Florida law that provided a dollar-for-dollar subsidy to a candidate's opponent once that candidate exceeded a statutory expenditure limit. The panel concluded that Rick Scott, then-candidate in the Republican primary for the Governor of Florida, had made a substantial showing of likelihood of success on the merits because, even if the law served compelling state interests, the law was not the least restrictive means of serving those interests. Scott went on to win the Republican primary and the general election.
- Common Cause/Georgia v. Billups (11th Cir. 2009). Pryor wrote for a unanimous panel upholding a Georgia law that required all registered voters in Georgia to present a government-issued photo identification to be allowed to vote in person. The law also required Georgia to issue, free of charge, a "Georgia voter identification card" to any registered Georgia voter who lacked an acceptable form of identification. The panel concluded that the NAACP and voters had standing to challenge the law, but that the district court did not abuse its discretion when it declined to enjoin the law because the burdens on voters from the law were insignificant and the state had legitimate interests in preventing voter fraud.
- Pelphrey v. Cobb County (11th Cir. 2008). Pryor wrote the majority (2–1) opinion, joined by judge Charles R. Wilson, affirming the district court ruling that sectarian prayers used to open commission meetings did not violate the Establishment Clause as long as the prayer opportunity was not exploited to proselytize or to advance or disparage any particular faith or belief. U.S. district court judge Donald M. Middlebrooks dissented.
- United States v. Campa, (11th Cir. 2008). Pryor wrote the majority (2–1) opinion, joined by Birch, upholding the convictions of five Cuban spies ("The Cuban Five") for espionage.
- Zibtluda LLC v. Gwinnett County, Georgia, (11th Cir. 2005). Opinion affirmed district court ruling that a local ordinance limiting the placement of adult entertainment establishments was constitutional. The opinion was notable for Pryor's quote of a line from The B-52's song "Love Shack" in describing the proposed establishment.

== Supreme Court consideration ==
On May 16, 2016, then-presidential candidate Donald Trump released a list of eleven individuals from which he would pick to fill the vacancy left on the Supreme Court by the death of Antonin Scalia, including Pryor.

At a Republican primary debate in South Carolina, Trump said the following about Supreme Court nominations "we could have a Diane Sykes or you could have a Bill Pryor, we have some fantastic people."

It was reported in mid-December that Trump had narrowed his choices to "three or four individuals", with the top two leading candidates being Sykes and Pryor. Trump announced Neil Gorsuch for his pick for the Court on January 31, 2017.

== See also ==
- George W. Bush judicial appointment controversies
- George W. Bush Supreme Court candidates
- Donald Trump Supreme Court candidates

Legal offices
Preceded by Jeff Sessions	Attorney General of Alabama; 1997–2004	Succeeded by Troy King
Preceded by Emmett Ripley Cox	Judge of the United States Court of Appeals for the Eleventh Circuit; 2004–present	Incumbent
Preceded by Edward Earl Carnes	Chief Judge of the United States Court of Appeals for the Eleventh Circuit; 2020–present	Incumbent
Party political offices
Preceded by Jeff Sessions	Republican nominee for Attorney General of Alabama; 1998, 2002	Succeeded by Troy King
Government offices
Preceded by Patti B. Saris	Chair of the United States Sentencing Commission; Acting; 2017–2018	Succeeded by Charles Breyer; Acting
