= Callie V. Granade =

American judge (born 1950)

Senior Judge of the United States District Court for the Southern District of Alabama
- Incumbent
- Assumed office March 7, 2016

Chief Judge of the United States District Court for the Southern District of Alabama
- In office 2003–2010
- Preceded by: Charles Randolph Butler Jr.
- Succeeded by: William H. Steele

Judge of the United States District Court for the Southern District of Alabama
- In office February 12, 2002 – March 7, 2016
- Appointed by: George W. Bush
- Preceded by: Alex T. Howard Jr.
- Succeeded by: Jeff Beaverstock

Personal details
- Born: Callie Virginia Smith; March 7, 1950 (age 76) Lexington, Virginia, U.S.
- Education: Hollins College (BA); University of Texas School of Law (JD)

Callie Virginia Granade (née Smith; born March 7, 1950) is a senior United States district judge of the United States District Court for the Southern District of Alabama. The first female federal prosecutor in Mobile, Granade became the first woman in Alabama to be named a fellow of the American College of Trial Lawyers, and the first female federal district judge in her district.

== Early life and education ==
Born in Lexington, Virginia, Granade is the granddaughter of former Judge Richard Rives of the United States Court of Appeal for the Fifth Circuit, the federal judge who wrote the majority opinion in Browder v. Gayle (1956) finding Montgomery, Alabama's bus segregation unconstitutional. She was raised in Louisville, Kentucky, where she attended the Louisville Collegiate School, graduating in 1968. She graduated from Hollins College with her Bachelor of Arts degree in 1972 and later from University of Texas School of Law with a Juris Doctor in 1975.

== Legal career ==
Following law school graduation, Granade became a law clerk for John Godbold of the United States Court of Appeals for the Fifth Circuit (1975 to 1976). She was an Assistant United States Attorney in the Southern District of Alabama from 1977 to 2001, and the district's interim United States Attorney from 2001 to 2002. Among her high-profile cases in her 25 years as a federal prosecutor, Granade led the successful prosecution of Mobile City Commissioner Lambert C. Mims for extortion.

== Federal judicial career ==
On the recommendation of Senators Jeff Sessions and Richard Shelby, President George W. Bush nominated Granade to the United States District Court for the Southern District of Alabama on September 4, 2001, after Judge Alex T. Howard Jr. assumed senior status. Granade was confirmed by the Senate on February 4 and received her commission on February 12, 2002. She served as Chief Judge from 2003 to 2010. She assumed senior status on March 7, 2016.

Perhaps her highest profile ruling was issued on January 23, 2015, when Judge Granade struck down Alabama's ban on same-sex marriage as violating the Fourteenth Amendment's guarantees of equal protection and due process.

== Sources ==
- Cook v. Atwood Oceanics"Order" (PDF). U.S. District Court for Southern Alabama.
- Activist judge? Careful jurist? Meet the woman who made gay marriage legal in Alabama, AL.com, February 7, 2015

Legal offices
Preceded by Alex T. Howard Jr.	Judge of the United States District Court for the Southern District of Alabama; 2002–2016	Succeeded by Jeff Beaverstock
Preceded by Charles Randolph Butler Jr.	Chief Judge of the United States District Court for the Southern District of Alabama; 2003–2010	Succeeded by William H. Steele
