= David M. Smolin =

American legal scholar

- David M. Smolin
- Born: New York City, US
- Education: New College of Florida, University of Cincinnati College of Law
- Known for: Director for The Center for Children, Law, and Ethics
- Children: 8
- Relatives: Lee Smolin
- Scientific career
- Fields: Law
- Institutions: Cumberland School of Law

David Mark Smolin is a professor of law at Cumberland School of Law in Birmingham, Alabama where he is the Harwell G. Davis Chair in Constitutional Law, director for The Center for Children, Law, and Ethics, former director of the Center for Biotechnology, Law, and Ethics, and faculty advisor for the Law, Science and Technology Society.

Smolin deals with international adoption scandals (see child laundering) and is the creator of an informational website on international adoption called Adopting Internationally. He has been interviewed and submitted content on the subject to National Public Radio, ABC News, Al Jazeera, The New York Times, The Salt Lake Tribune, CBC Radio, Radio Netherlands and others.

He presented on adoption issues at the Korean Women's Development Institute in Seoul, Korea, the Second International Symposium on Korean Adoption Studies in Seoul, Korea, and (as an independent expert) at the Hague Special Commission on the Practical Operation of the Hague Adoption Convention.

His law review article, Child Laundering, written in 2005, won Cumberland's inaugural Lightfoot, Franklin and White Faculty Scholarship Award for the most significant scholarly work published during the preceding year, and is consistently listed in the 10 Most Popular Articles in the bepress Legal Series.

His own family's international adoption, discovery that their children were stolen, and ultimately successful, though arduous, six year search for the girls' original birth family in India was featured on NPR's Morning Edition, titled Adoption Stories Gone Bad, and by ABC News.

== Career ==
Smolin is an internationally recognized expert in the field of inter-country adoption, and a nationally recognized expert in Bioethics and Biotechnology, Reproductive Constitutional law, Family and Juvenile law, and Law and Religion. He has testified before legislative committees in the U.S. Congress, as well as in five states on constitutional issues.

Smolin joined the Cumberland faculty in 1987 after clerking for Senior Judge George Edwards of the U.S. Court of Appeals for the Sixth Circuit from 1986 to 1987. Prior to that Smolin worked in a psychiatric hospital. He has also served as an adjunct professor at the interdenominational Beeson Divinity School.

Smolin is the author of over 35 articles, primarily published as law reviews, though some of his works have appeared in journals such as First Things.

Much of Smolin's academic work concerns international adoption, child trafficking and child laundering.

=== Inter-country adoption ===
==== Al Jazeera interview - Stolen Babies - People and Power segment ====
On June 24, 2009, Smolin appeared in an interview with Al Jazeera on the subject of stolen babies from Guatemala, (see Human trafficking, Child laundering) after both the US Department of Justice and the Bureau of Consular Affairs at the US State Department declined to be interviewed and declined to comment on the subject. Smolin referred to his own situation involving his stolen adopted daughters and said that there is no easy solution to child laundering because it is usually successful and too often the perfect crime. He went on to say that the Office of Children's Issues at the State Department should immediately facilitate DNA testing of the children and mothers who claim their children were stolen. He said adoptive parents should attempt to acquire DNA testing of their adoptive children so that they can form partnerships with the birth family.

==== Celebrity adoptions and the subsidiarity principle ====
Smolin has said that celebrity adoptions highlight the problems with inter-country adoption. While not being expressly opposed to celebrity adoption or international adoption, Smolin believes in the need for an implementation of the subsidiarity principle as it relates to international adoption because the huge amount of money channeled into adopting a child pales in comparison to the relatively small amount of money that could, in many circumstances, be used to reunite broken families and improve conditions within the child's culture and country of origin. He states the need to:

Reform international adoption by putting a priority on keeping children in their original family and within their community.

Smolin also believes that without a safe adoption system, comparatively wealthy families seeking to adopt children from impoverished nations are in a position to exploit that poverty, and where $20–30,000 may be spent to adopt a child, several hundred dollars may be all that is needed to reunite a child with that child's family and substantially improve conditions within the child's community. In general he believes that one major problem with international adoption is that the adoptions system is corrupted by far too much money and that there are no real consequences for violating adoption regulations.

===== Debate with Jane Aronson =====
On June 16, 2009, Smolin debated Jane Aronson on the topic of celebrity adoptions for CBC Radio. Both showed appreciation for one another with Smolin stating he admired Aronson's work in helping orphanages and improving international communities which are the sources for adoptive children, and Aronson stating "I'm glad to be on the program with you David because you're a smart and warm human being."

Aronson stated the issue is poverty and that there is no social services network to provide for the families. Smolin's views are, in part, stated above.

==== Cumberland School of Law Symposium on International Adoption ====
On April 15, 2005, Smolin, with the cooperation of Cumberland School of Law, hosted a Symposium on International adoption. The purpose was to "take advantage of the gathered expertise to explore the question of how international adoption can be reformed to ensure respect for the rights and dignity of birth families, children and adoptive families [the adoption triad].".

Richard Cross, a senior special agent for Immigration and Customs Enforcement [ICE] assigned to the ICE Human Trafficking Unit in Seattle, Washington, spoke at the event:

Richard Cross, the lead federal investigator for the prosecution of Lauryn Galindo for visa fraud and money laundering involved in Cambodian adoptions, estimated that most of the 800 adoptions Galindo facilitated were fraudulent--either based on fraudulent paperwork, coerced/induced/recruited relinquishments, babies bought, identities of the children switched, etc.

==== Adopting Internationally website ====
Smolin and his wife launched Adopting Internationally website, a website meant to provide information regarding "the complex issues associated with international adoption." The site includes personal stories and academic analysis.

The site is also based, in part, on the Smolin's personal experience in the field of international adoption, and the Smolins are unabashedly dedicated to reforming intercountry adoption "so that it may consistently and reliably assist all members of the adoption triad (birth families, adoptees, and adoptive families)."

=== Biotechnology, law and ethics ===
Smolin heads Cumberland Law School's Center for Biotechnology, Law, and Ethics, a center unlike any other of its kind in the United States. Research focuses on contemporary bioethics dilemmas and issues related to the center's Annual Symposium, which is typically co-sponsored by the Cumberland Law Review.

The center has attracted numerous experts including ethicist Gregory Pence, atmospheric scientist John Christy, and U.S. Congressman Artur Davis. Each year the Cumberland Law Review typically publishes an issue featuring articles by visiting speakers.

=== Human rights ===
Smolin is a human rights advocate but approaches the international movement with concerns, which can be summed up in the conclusion to his paper Will International Human Rights Be Used as a Tool of Cultural Genocide? The Interaction of Human Rights Norms, Religion, Culture, and Gender published by the Journal of Law and Religion.

Smolin's basic view regarding the scope of the international movement is that not all worthy human causes deserve to be labeled or acted upon as a right. He believes that doing so could erode or destroy the most basic human rights if the international movement gained enough power to enact all of its goals.

== Background ==
=== Education ===
- BA Applied Psychology, New College of Florida 1980
- JD University of Cincinnati College of Law 1986

=== Personal life ===
Smolin was born in New York City, USA. His mother was the playwright Pauline Smolin, and his father was Michael Smolin, an environmental and process engineer. His brother Lee Smolin is a theoretical physicist.

His wife is Desiree Smolin. They have eight children, two of whom were adopted from India in 1998.

== Articles ==
- Overcoming Religious Objections to the Convention on the Rights of the Child, Emory International Law Review.
- Child Laundering, Wayne Law Review
- Religion, Education, and the Theoretically Liberal State: Contrasting Evangelical and Secularist Perspectives, 44 Journal of Catholic Studies 99 (2005)
- Does Bioethics Provide Answers? Secular and Religious Bioethics and Our Procreative Future, 35 Cumberland Law Review 473 (2005).
- Nili Luo and David Smolin, Intercountry Adoption and China: Emerging Questions and Developing Chinese Perspectives, 35 Cumberland Law Review 597 (2005).
- The Two Faces of Intercountry Adoption: The Significance of the Indian Adoption Scandals, 35 Seton Hall Law Review 403 (2005)
- Intercountry Adoption as Child Trafficking, 39 Valparaiso Law Review 281 (2005)
- A Tale of Two Treaties: Furthering Social Justice Through the Redemptive Myths of Childhood, Emory International Law Review, 17 Emory International Law Review 967 (2003).
- Nontherapeutic Research with Children: The Virtues and Vices of Legal Uncertainty, 33 Cumberland Law Review 621 (2003).
- Should a Ban on Reproductive Cloning Include a Ban on Cloning for Purposes of Research or Therapy?, 32 Cumberland Law Review 487 (2002).
- Strategic Choices in the International Campaign Against Child Labor, 22 Human Rights Quarterly 942 (2000)
- Conflict and Ideology in the International Campaign Against Child Labour, 16 Hofstra Labor and Employment Law Journal 383 (1999)
- The Future of Genocide: A Spectacle for the New Millennium? 23 Fordham International Law Journal 460 (1999)
- Review, First Things (August/September 1999): 56–58.: The Problematics of Moral and Legal Theory, Richard A. Posner (Belknap/Harvard University Press).
- Will International Human Rights Be Used as a Tool of Cultural Genocide? The Interaction of Human Rights Norms, Religion, Culture and Gender, Journal of Law and Religion, Vol. 12, No. 1 (1995–1996), pp. 143–171.

=== Recent works ===
The first article won Cumberland Law School's first annual Lightfoot award for most significant scholarly paper published during the preceding year and is consistently listed in the 10 Most Popular Articles in the bepress Legal Series:

- Child Laundering: How the Intercountry Adoption System Legitimizes and Incentivizes the Practices of Buying, Trafficking, Kidnapping, and Stealing Children, also published by the Wayne Law Review.
- Unpublished: Child Laundering As Exploitation: Applying Anti-Trafficking Norms to Intercountry Adoption Under the Coming Hague Regime
- The Two Faces of Intercountry Adoption: The Significance of the Indian Adoption Scandals, Seton Hall Law Review; and
- Intercountry Adoption as Child Trafficking, Valparaiso Law Review.

== Conferences ==
- Organizer and presenter, "The Baby Market: The Future of High-Tech and Low-Tech Markets in Children", February 14, 2008.
- Speaker, Adoption Ethics and Accountability Conference, October 15–16, 2007, The Evan B. Donaldson Adoption Institute and Ethica, Inc., Arlington, Virginia.
- The Cultural Contexts of the Stem Cell Debate; Stem Cells: Diffusing the Rhetoric. North Carolina Central University School of Law, Durham, North Carolina, April 13, 2007. Sponsored by Durham's Biotechnology and Pharmaceutical Law Institute and the North Carolina Research Campus.
- Speaker, Emory Law School, "What's Wrong With Rights for Children?" Oct. 20–21, 2005 Emory Law School Conference.
