= Center for Children, Law, and Ethics =

Research center in Birmingham, Alabama, US

The Center for Children, Law, and Ethics is a research center at Cumberland School of Law in Birmingham, Alabama, directed by the internationally recognized legal scholar David Smolin. It combines the interest and involvement of law students, local, national and international advisers, to facilitate the production of scholarship and advice in the field of children's issues.

== Description ==
The center is designed to operate at the crossroads of viewpoints, issues, events, disciplines, and cases in a way that engages diverse stakeholders involved in children's issues. By strategically engaging issues, cases, and events that crossover and impact diverse communities, the Center serves as a conduit for facilitating engagements and confrontations that might otherwise not occur. Through these engagements and confrontations the Center advances the best interests and welfare of children, locally, nationally, and internationally.

The Center focuses on a wide range of local, national, and international children's issues, including:

- Adoption
- Child Abuse and Neglect
- Child Labor
- Child Trafficking
- Children's Rights
- Education
- Juvenile Justice
- Orphans and Vulnerable Children
- Pediatric Bioethics
- Reproductive Bioethics
- Family/Divorce Law

== History ==
The Center evolved from The Center for Biotechnology, Law, and Ethics at Cumberland, which now no longer operates.
