= Mike Stewart (novelist) =

American author and lawyer (born 1955)

Michael Garnet Stewart
- Born: May 15, 1955 (age 71); Vredenburgh, Alabama
- Education: Cumberland School of Law, Auburn University
- Occupations: Author, lawyer
- Years active: 1990s–present
- Notable work: Tom McInnes novels

Michael Garnet Stewart (born May 15, 1955) is an American author.

== Biography ==
A native of Vredenburgh, Alabama, Stewart attended Tabor Academy, Massachusetts for the first two years of high school but graduated from Wilcox Academy in Camden, Alabama. He received his undergraduate degree from Auburn University. In between school terms, he spent the summers working as a forest technician and farmhand. After graduating from college, he worked as a copy editor for the Atlanta Journal and assisted on a friend's unsuccessful gubernatorial campaign.

In 1985, Stewart enrolled at Cumberland School of Law, where he became an associate editor of the Cumberland Law Review and moot court champion. He was a leadership scholarship recipient and the author of a published case note cited by the Alabama Supreme Court. After graduating from law school, he was admitted to the Alabama Bar and began work as a corporate attorney, specializing in healthcare law.

In the 1990s, he retired from his position as General Counsel of Complete Health, a large healthcare company, and pursued his lifelong dream of writing novels. He lives in Birmingham with his family.

== Novels ==
=== Tom McInnes series ===
==== Sins of the Brother (1999) ====
Stewart's first novel, Sins of the Brother, is the first installment of the Tom McInnes series. It is marked by a creative and "labyrinthine plot", Southern gothic ambiance, and familial tension. The New York Times gave it a strong review.

Upon hearing of his younger brother's death, Tom McInnes, a successful attorney from Mobile, Alabama, returns to the small sawmill town where he grew up. There he learns about his brother's gambling debts, cocaine use, and suspicious death on the river. As Tom digs more and more deeply into the mystery surrounding his brother's life and death, he places himself in increasingly grave danger.

==== Dog Island (2001) ====
Mike Stewart's second novel follows Tom McInnes through Alabama and Florida, specifically through St. George Island and nearby Dog Island. When a teenage runaway witnesses a murder, she comes to Tom for help.

==== A Clean Kill (2002) ====
In the third McInnes mystery, a young woman asks Tom to investigate the death of her mother in a small-town hospital. As Tom explores the suspicious death, an attempt is made on his life, the state bar threatens to disbar him, and he is accused of murdering another lawyer. Working with a psychologist/jury expert, Tom uncovers a jury-rigging conspiracy. The critic at Publishers Weekly opined that "Stewart's third mystery featuring attorney Tom McInnes (after Dog Island, 2000), again combines the suspense, richly textured plot, picturesque Alabama settings, double-crossing characters and sparkling writing that set his first two books apart from the pack." Kirkus Reviews found it a good read.

=== A Perfect Life (2004) ===
Stewart's fourth book is not a Tom McInnes mystery. A Perfect Life tells the story of Scott Thomas, a Harvard-trained clinical psychologist. Scott is carjacked, burgled, and framed for the murder of a woman at the Boston hospital where he works. With no family to stand by him, Scott alone must prove his innocence and take back his life, confronting his own dark past along the way.

== Critical reception ==
"Compelling ... Laced with page-turning tension and memorable scenes that are as poignant as they are vital.... Rich details and smart use of dialogue help make this a near-perfect ride." --Publishers Weekly

"Stewart shows a gift for economy of language and plot that is rare these days, and a talent for evoking atmosphere that has all but vanished from thriller novels.…" –The Washington Post

"Stewart evokes taste, smell, sight and touch to put the reader right in the middle of the scene." –The Charlotte Observer
