= American adoption from China =

Between the 1990s and 2024, China was an origin country for many transnational adoptees in the United States. In September 2024, China strengthened adoption law, limiting adoption by foreigners to relatives. For the 32 years that adoption was largely open to foreigners, an estimated 80,000 Chinese children were adopted by American parents.

== Background ==
=== China ===
Adoption from China was driven in part by the country's one-child policy, which was in effect from 1979 to 2015. In April 1992, China enacted the Adoption Law of China, which officially authorized adoption of Chinese children by foreigners, who were treated the same as Chinese citizens. Prior to this, the country had no national policy on adopting children to foreigners.

=== United States ===
International adoption by Americans generally emerged after World War II, with the first wave of adoptions being children from war-torn countries in Europe. Interest shifted to East Asia in the 1950s, with American involvement in the Korean War. South Korea became the country to send the most adoptees to the United States for the next few decades, until the end of the 1980s. Although international adoption was significantly more expensive and time-consuming than domestic adoption, international adoption continued to grow in popularity. This was due to multiple factors, including negative perceptions and fears of the domestic adoption system. For example, prospective adoptive parents feared that courts could reunite domestically adopted children with their birth families, something much less likely in an international adoption. Domestic adoption was also limited for older couples, single parents, or gay parents.

By the 1990s, when China opened transnational adoption, common countries of origin for transnational adoptees in the United States were Korea, Ecuador, Russia, and Romania.

== Adoption rates ==
In 1988, Chinese adoption law was loosened at the provincial level, opening the process to foreigners. However, the process was very difficult, and thus only 12 children were adopted to Americans in 1988. In 1992, the first year in which Chinese adoption regulations were more fully loosened at the national level, 206 children were adopted. Following 1993 revisions to the law, adoption rates to Americans exploded: from 1,400 children total between 1990 and 1994, to 2,130 in 1995 alone. In 1995 and 1996, and from 2000 to at least 2006, China was the most common country of origin for American international adoptees, as part of a general rise in American transnational adoptions.

Between 1988 and 2004, the United States issued 47,501 immigrant visas to Chinese "orphans". American adoption of Chinese children peaked in 2005, with 7,903 adoptions that year. A steady decrease in adoptions over the next two decades was credited to the improving Chinese economy and the loosening of the one-child policy.

By 2024, when the Chinese government ended foreign adoptions from China, more than 160,000 children had been adopted from China to foreigners; about half of these children were adopted by Americans.

=== Rates by year ===
According to U.S. State Department statistics, the number of immigrant visas issued to Chinese orphans per fiscal year is as follows:

- FY 1991: 61
- FY 1992: 206
- FY 1993: 330
- FY 1994: 787
- FY 1995: 2,130
- FY 1996: 3,333
- FY 1997: 3,597
- FY 1998: 4,206
- FY 1999: 4,101
- FY 2000: 5,053
- FY 2001: 4,681
- FY 2002: 6,119
- FY 2003: 6,859
- FY 2004: 7,044
- FY 2005: 7,906
- FY 2006: 6,493
- FY 2007: 5,453
- FY 2008: 3,909
- FY 2009: 3,000
- FY 2010: 3,401
- FY 2011: 2,587
- FY 2012: 2,696
- FY 2013: 2,306

== Adoption process ==
From November 1993, "the China Adoption Organization (CAO) [was] responsible for centralized coordination of adoption of Chinese children by foreigners". Adoption from China by Americans began with submitting a completed application, which included "proof of age, marital status, occupation, financial status, health condition, and a police record," all "notarized, certified and authenticated with the seal of the Embassy or Consulate of China in the United States". The CAO then matched children with prospective parents "through an approved, U.S.-licensed adoption agency or attorney". The CAO then provided the prospective parents with a referral and portfolio of the matched child; if the prospective parents accepted the referral, they would complete paperwork and come to China to finalize the adoption.

Once in China, the prospective parent/s would spend ten to 14 days completing paperwork and undergoing a largely formal final interview. Most prospective parent/s did not meet their matched child in person until shortly before signing the adoption papers.

After returning to the United States with their child (still considered a Chinese citizen), adoptive parents must obtain an immigrant visa from the U.S. Immigration and Naturalization Service (INS) and prove that they fulfill their state's adoption requirements. As part of this process, a social worker visited an adoptive parents' home and conducted interviews. Parents also needed to provide the INS with proof that the adopted child had been legally eligible for adoption. The adoption would be formally recognized with a state-issued adoption decree, although this did not guarantee U.S. citizenship for the adopted child.

The majority of adopted children gained citizenship through the Adoptee Citizenship Act of 2000.

== Demographics ==
=== Chinese adoptees ===
The majority of children adopted from China by American parents were infant or toddler girls, and disabled boys. Cultural attitudes tended to favor sons over daughters, meaning daughters were more likely to be abandoned or surrendered to orphanages. In later years, most adoptees were disabled or had special needs, as increasing exemptions to the one-child policy allowed families to keep healthy daughters.

By the early to mid 2000s, the number of children being surrendered to orphanage lowered. This was due to multiple factors, including increasing exemptions to the one-child policy, and an improving Chinese economy that meant Chinese families not within those exemptions could afford to pay fines for having additional children. In order to continue upholding the adoption market, some traffickers and family-planning officers began using coercion to source babies for orphanages. Rural and illiterate families were particularly vulnerable to these tactics, with many having children taken from them unwillingly. At orphanages, the children's backstories would be falsified to indicate abandonment.

=== American adoptive families ===
Although travel to China was costly for Americans looking to adopt (costing in 1997 US$10,000-20,000, compared to a domestic adoption at US$3–7,000), adoption from China did offer several benefits over domestic adoptions. Chinese adoptees were fully disconnected from their birth families; under Chinese law, only children classified as "abandoned" could be adopted by foreigners. Chinese adoptees were also more likely to be healthy; transnational adoptees from other countries were more likely to be disabled, ill, or have other problems from extended life in orphanages. The process was also often shorter than domestic adoption, taking around a year if all paperwork was in order.

While domestic adoption within the U.S. tended to favor younger, married couples, adoption from China favored older individuals, either single or married. According to a 1997 U.S. report, under the Adoption Law of China, any person, "single or married, who are over thirty-five years old and childless are eligible to adopt a child with no pre-existing medical conditions". Parents younger than 35, or parents who already had children, "are only eligible to adopt a child with a mild or correctable medical condition". These restrictions were not as fully enforced in early years, but were reiterated in 1996.

In 1997, in an effort to make international adoption more accessible, the U.S. government offered "adoptive parents of foreign children" a "one-time tax credit up to US$5,000 for healthy children, and up to US$6,000 credit for children with special needs".

Adoption from China grew even more popular in the early 2000s, following the unveiling of trafficking or corruption in adoption processes in other East Asian countries like Cambodia and Vietnam. At the time, Americans felt that adoption from China was more ethical, as "due to the steps the Chinese government took to ensure that each child was indeed legally available for adoption".

== Lives in the United States ==
Chinese children adopted by American parents had a variety of experiences, although many were raised in predominantly white environments by older, financially secure parents. This places these adoptees in a unique place within the Chinese-American and larger Asian-American experience, facing prejudice and racism for their origins while also experiencing some level of disconnect from Chinese and Chinese-American culture. Interview projects and surveys have found a variety of attitudes held by adoptees towards their experiences, many of them nuanced.

Some adoptees have used DNA testing, such as 23andMe, to find relatives, including biological siblings also adopted to American parents and parents or other extended relatives.

=== Reunification ===
By the mid-2000s, some Americans began to suspect some adopted children had been removed from their birth parents through coercion or force. Some of these Americans began mounting searches to reunite Chinese birth parents with their children, though these were largely unsuccessful. In the late 2010s and 2020s, DNA testing has offered a more reliable route to conduct searches. However, searches are still subject to multiple obstacles, including lack of education in China on overseas adoption.

Adoptees hold varied views on finding their birth families. Some are concerned of the mental toll of a search that might take years, or that their birth family might make financial or social demands of them.

Birth parents have generally expressed interest in searching for their adopted children, even if they are suspicious of giving information to authorities. Adoptive parents have varied attitudes, with some being more interested in reunification searches than the child, and others being completely uninterested.

== Views within China ==
A 2004 study of about 200 Chinese adults generally viewed transnational adoptions by Americans as a positive thing, although they were concerned for children's disconnect with their birth culture, and that adoption might be viewed negatively by the wider global community. However, overseas adoption is not largely recognized in the Chinese popular consciousness.

== End of transnational adoption ==
In September 2024, the Chinese government officially revised adoption law to close adoptions to foreigners unless they were relatives to the child they sought to adopt.

The move faced varied reactions, including among Americans who had been adopted from China. Some praised the move, noting the abuses of the system and the struggles of being disconnected from their birth country. Others had hoped to adopt from China themselves, and noted their personal ties to their adoptive families.

== Notable adoptees ==
- Scout Bassett (born 1988), Paralympic athlete
- Ly Xīnzhèn M. Zhǎngsūn Brown (born 1993), disability activist
- Annie Carey (born 2004), Paralympic athlete
- Chloe Chambers (born 2004), racing driver
- Kara Eaker (born 2002), artistic gymnast
- Tiffany Espensen (born 1999), actress
- Grace Glenn (born 1998), retired artistic gymnast
- Lily Hevesh (born 1998), domino artist and YouTuber
- Marybai Huking (born 1996), Paralympic goalball player
- Morgan Hurd (born 2001), photographer and former artistic gymnast
- SuGui Kriss (born 1987), Paralympic volleyball player
- Leah Lewis (born 1996), actress
- Corrie Lothrop (born 1992), artistic gymnast
- Maylee Phelps (born 2006), wheelchair tennis player
- Leo Sheng (born 1996), actor and activist
- Chelsea Stein (born 2003), wheelchair racer
- Maxine Weatherby (born 2001), ice dancer

== See also ==
- One Child Nation, 2019 documentary about the impacts of the one-child policy
