= E. Snow Martin =

American politician

- Martin in 1939

Member of the Florida House of Representatives from Polk County
- In office 1937–1939

Personal details
- Born: August 13, 1909 Ocala, Florida, U.S.
- Died: September 7, 2007 (aged 98)
- Party: Democratic
- Education: Cumberland Law School

Ephraim Snow Martin (August 13, 1909 – September 7, 2007) was an American politician. He served as a Democratic member of the Florida House of Representatives.

== Life and career ==
Martin was born in Ocala, Florida. He attended Cumberland Law School.

Martin served in the Florida House of Representatives from 1937 to 1939.

Martin died on September 7, 2007, at the age of 98.
