= Cumberland School of Law's Center for Biotechnology, Law, and Ethics =

Research center in Alabama, US

The Center for Biotechnology, Law, and Ethics
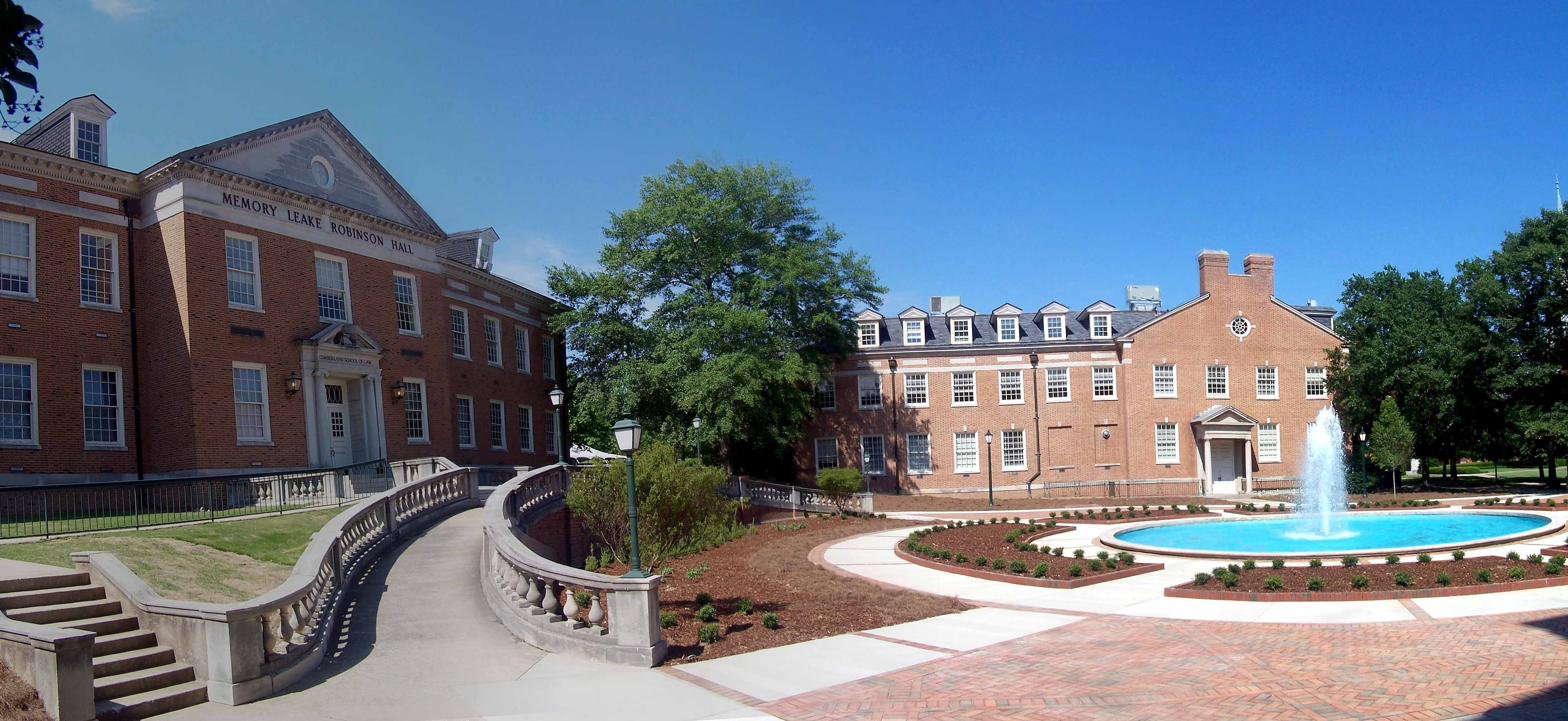
- Type: Research & Policy Institute
- Established: December 2003
- Affiliations: Cumberland School of Law, Samford University, University of Alabama at Birmingham, the Cumberland Law Review.
- Dean: John L. Carroll
- Faculty: David M. Smolin, director
- Students: Kyle Newchek
- Location: Birmingham, Alabama, United States
- Publications: The Cumberland Law Review - co-publisher
- Website: cumberland.samford.edu/biotech/about

The Center for Biotechnology, Law and Ethics is a bioethics, biotechnology, and biotechnology law research center of Cumberland School of Law located on the Samford University campus in Birmingham, Alabama. It is one of the few research centers of its kind at a United States law school, and, in conjunction with the Cumberland Law Review, the Center publishes an annual journal of scholarly works, which circulates in the United States and foreign countries.

The center was founded in December 2003 by David M. Smolin, who serves as its director.

The Center focuses its research and conferences on the ethical and legal implications of biotechnology and biotechnology law, rather than pursuing a general emphasis on the subject of bioethics or bioethics law like many other academic research centers. Its location within Birmingham places it in an emerging center for biotechnology research and commerce. Of primary importance for the Center, however, is generating law review articles on emerging biotechnology issues, which is often done as part of a conference speakers' presentation.

== Methodology and purpose ==
Research focuses on understanding current bioethical issues related to biotechnology and biotechnology law, as well as how different ideologies answer, or if they even can answer, different bioethical issues. The Center's approach to bioethical research attempts to understand "multiple perspectives" and evaluate the validity of each.

The Center has sponsored five conferences that have dealt with the United States health care system, research on children, biofuels, genetically modified foods, and whether the field of bioethics and its methodology can provide actual answers to ethical questions or merely the opinions of ethicists.

== Annual symposium ==
2010 Conference - The Missing Girls of China and India: What Can Be Done?

The center hosts an annual Symposium at which experts give presentations on bioethical issues. The papers are published in the Cumberland Law Review. The symposia attempt to offer a broad range of views and seek factual, persuasive solutions to problems, rather than to generate opinionated debates.

Speakers have included United States Congressman Artur Davis, atmospheric scientist John Christy, medical ethics expert Gregory Pence, Vermont Law School's environmental center director Michael Dworkin, John Nyman, Larry Palmer, and law professors, entrepreneurs and other experts. Speakers often publish a paper in the Cumberland Law Review that develops the theme of their presentation. Many of the articles are available online.

=== Topics ===
- Feb. 26, 2010 - The Missing Girls of China and India: What Can Be Done?
- Feb., 2009 - Transportation Energy Policy in National and Global Perspective: a New Beginning?
- Feb., 2008 - Child laundering and international adoption - "The Baby Market
- Feb., 2007 - The United States Health Care System: Access, Equity, and Efficiency
- Feb., 2006 - Biofuels and the New Energy Economy
- Mar., 2005 - Bioethics Methodology - Does the Field of Bioethics Provide Answers or Expertise? - An Exploration of Secular and Religious Methodologies
- Mar., 2004 - Genetically Modified Foods - National and Global Implications of Genetically Modified Organisms: Law, Ethics & Science.
- Mar., 2003 - The Ethical and Legal Issues in Research with Children

== Scholarly output ==
The following are a selection of articles generated by the Center, which are available on-line. For a complete list refer to the Cumberland Law Review:

- Christy, J.R., 2006: The ever-changing climate system, Cumberland Law Review, 36 No. 3, 493-504
- Dolgin, Janet, Method, Mediations, and the Moral Dimensions of Preimplantation Genetic Diagnosis, Cumberland Law Review, 35 No. 3
- Nelson, L.Jack, Catholic Bioethics and the Case of Terry Schiavo, Cumberland Law Review, 35 No. 3
- Rabago, Karl, A Strategy For Developing Stationary Biodiesel Generation, Cumberland Law Review, 36 No. 3
- Shepherd, Lois, Shattering the Neutral Surrogate Myth in End of Life Decisionmaking: Terry Schiavo and Her Family Cumberland Law Review, 35 No. 3
- Smolin, David, Does Bioethics Provide Answers? Secular and Religious Bioethics and Our Procreative Futures, Cumberland Law Review, 35 No. 3
- Smolin, David, Nontherapeutic Research with Children: The Virtues and Vices of Legal Uncertainty, 33 Cumberland Law Review 621 (2003).
- Smolin, Michael, Challenges and Opportunities for Energy Alternatives for Transportation in the United States, Cumberland Law Review, 36 No. 3
- Tomain, Joseph, Smart Energy Path: How Willie Nelson Saved The Planet, Cumberland Law Review, 36 No. 3
- Weaver, Jacqueline, The Traditional Petroleum-Based Economy: An "Eventful" Future Cumberland Law Review, 36 No. 3

=== Missing Girls of China and India, 2010 ===
This Conference is being held on February 26, 2010 at Cumberland School of Law in Birmingham, Alabama to discuss the causes and socio-economic impact of "missing girls" in China and India. "In China, approximately ten percent of females have disappeared from the population at birth in last generation alone. Similarly, about five percent of female are "missing" from India's population. Collectively, this indicates a loss of tens of millions of Chinese and Indian females which creates significant socioeconomic complications. The sex-ratio imbalances in China and India have grown worse despite successful economic development and pressures toward cultural modernization. Scholarship on "the missing girls" of China and India has been increasingly successful in documenting and identifying some of the most direct causes. The purpose of this symposium is to gather and urge a group of the leading scholars to discuss remedies to the problem of missing girls."

1. Overview - Valerie Hudson, Brigham Young University
2. India - Sunil Khanna, Oregon State University
3. China - Susan Greenhalgh and Wang Feng, University of California-Irvine

=== Transportation Energy Policy, 2009 ===
2009 Conference - Transportation Energy Policy Symposium

This Conference was hosted on February 27, 2009 and its stated purpose was that: "The public in the United States and throughout much of the world has become keenly aware of the limitations of continued reliance on petroleum-based fuels. Concerns over diminishing supplies, growing demand, price instabilities, environmental impacts, international competition for limited resources, energy security, and the costs of foreign involvement necessitated by our "addiction to oil" have created an imperative toward renewable energy. Yet, some view the United States' first major venture into renewable fuels, corn-based ethanol, as a failure that has contributed to higher food prices and brings little overall environmental or supply gain. Political and popular rhetoric suggests that a technological fix, in forms such as second-generation biofuels, fuel cells, electric cars, or a hydrogen economy are just around the corner, and yet most estimates posit that petroleum based fuels will predominate for at least several more decades. President Barack Obama has promised a new and different energy policy. This conference, taking place a little more than month into the new administration, will look at the possibilities for transportation energy policy both for the United States and other nations. Upon examination, government has a limited set of tools it can use to promote a transition to renewable energy and promote energy conservation/efficiency. Options include subsidies or tax credits for renewable energy, taxing carbon-based energy, funding research, promoting/funding/designing for mass transit, renewable fuel standards, CAFÉ-fuel efficiency standards, and mandating that energy efficient/alternative energy cars be built in exchange for financial help for the car industry. These issues of supply, demand, price, security, nationalism, and environment occur within an interdependent world. Hence, this conference will look beyond the United States to transportation energy policy throughout the world."

1. Energy Futures - Professor Lakshman Guruswamy, University of Colorado Law School
2. United States Energy Policy - Professor Joshua Fershee, University of North Dakota School of Law
3. India's Energy Future Professor Deepa Badrinarayana, Chapman University School of Law
4. Human Rights, Human Development, and Energy - Professor David Smolin, Cumberland School of Law, Samford University (focusing on the need to pursue low cost energy primarily because it is a human rights issue)
5. Point/Counterpoint - Professor David Smolin (Cumberland/Samford) will moderate a discussion among all conference participants, inviting discussion by both conference participants and audience, on the hard questions and difficult choices facing both the United States and other nations in regard to transportation energy policy.

=== The Baby Market, 2008 ===
The speakers for this event were:

1. Michele Goodwin - visiting professor at University of Chicago Law School, chair-elect of the Association of American Law Schools section on law and medicine, and a fellow of the Institute of Medicine of Chicago.
2. Judith Daar - California law professor and clinical professor of medicine, "Progress and Pitfalls in Emerging Reproductive Technologies";
3. Gregory Pence - University of Alabama at Birmingham philosophy professor and medical ethics specialist, "The Case for Non-Regulation";
4. David M. Smolin - Cumberland professor and international children's issues specialist, "Money, Markets and Intercountry Adoption." Smolin is director of the Center for Biotechnology, Law and Ethics.
5. Arun Dohle - live commentary on a Danish public television documentary, "A Baby Business." Dohle was an adult adoptee and specialist on adoption corruption issues in India, was a consultant on the documentary.

=== Health Care Access, Equity, and Efficiency, 2007 ===
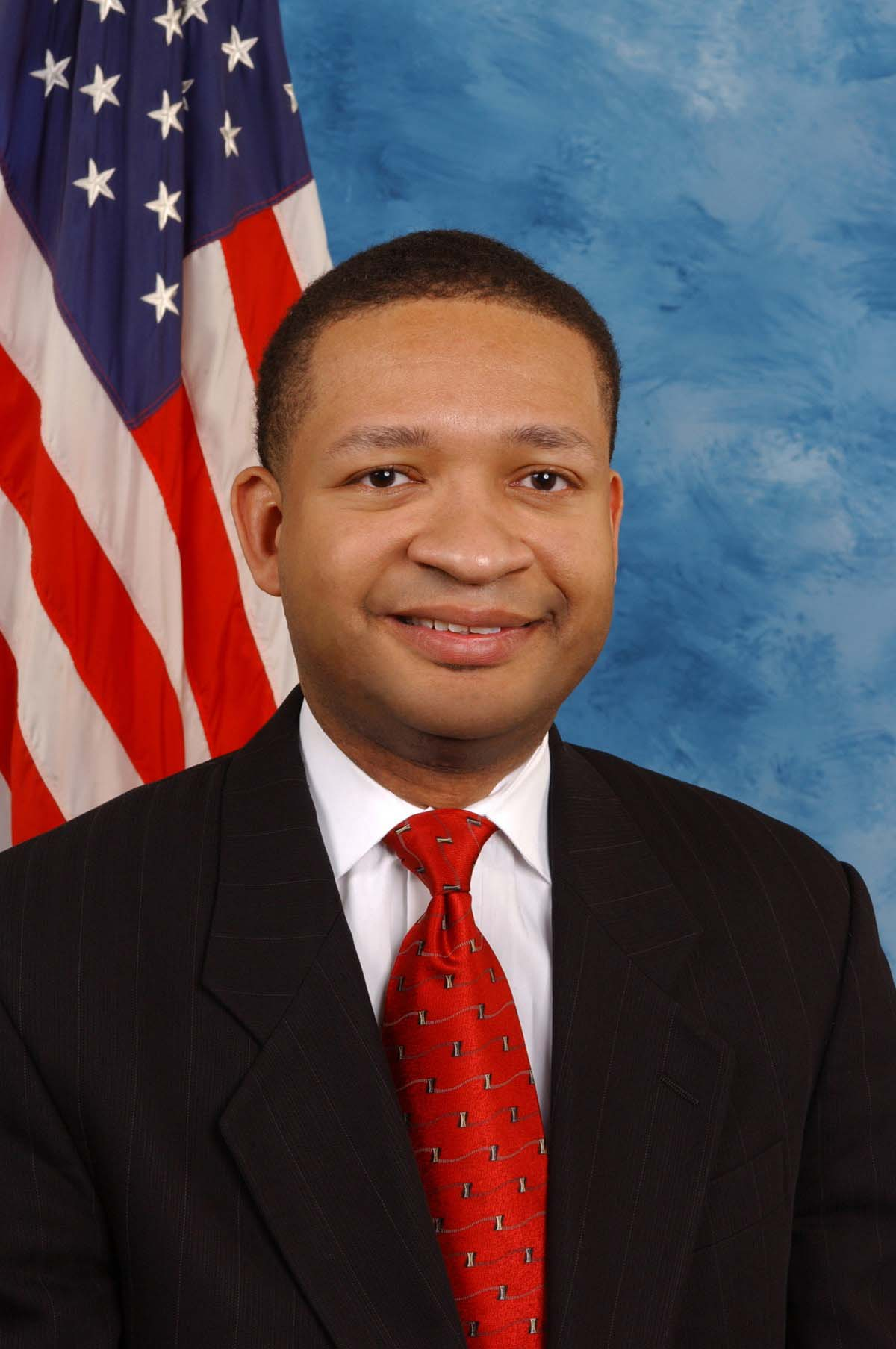
Artur Davis (D) - US Representative

This Conference was hosted on Thursday February 22, 2007 at Cumberland School of Law. The keynote speaker of the Conference was United States Representative Artur Davis (D) who spoke about the need for change in the current health care delivery system in the United States. His speech was delivered in part as a presentation of the Thurgood Marshall Lecture series sponsored by the Black Law Students Association at Cumberland.

The sponsors for the Symposium included the Center for Biotechnology, Law, and Ethics, Cumberland Law School, Samford University, the Cumberland Law Review, and Cumberland Law School's Chapter of the Black Law Students Association (BLSA)

The five panels were:

1. Overview - L.Jack Nelson of Cumberland School of Law
2. Equity is Efficient - John A. Nyman, Professor of Economics, University of Minnesota
3. A Thurgood Marshall Lecture - U.S. Representative Artur Davis (D)
4. Health Care Disparities: Race and Poverty - Dr. Camara Jones, CDC, and Sidney D. Watson, Professor of Law, Saint Louis University School of Law
5. Solutions - John V. Jacobi, Professor of Law, Seton Hall Law School, and Dr. Robert Ohsfeldt, Professor, Texas A&M School of Rural Public Health.

=== Biofuels and the New Energy Economy, 2006 ===
The Center for Biotechnology, Law and Ethics - 2006 Biofuels Symposium brochure

This Conference was hosted on Monday, February 10, 2006 at Cumberland School of Law. The speakers and publications analyzed global energy policy, climate change and the role of biofuels as a supplement to the petroleum-based economy in both the utility and transportation sectors. Host professor David Smolin stated that "[r]aising awareness of what's happening with traditional and alternative energy sources can help us as a society make more informed choices."

It included six panels and two question and answer sessions. The panels were:

1. The Traditional Energy Economy;
2. Energy Policy: A Human Rights Perspective;
3. Global Climate Change and Energy Policy;
4. National Security, Cost and Environmental Analysis of Bioenergy;
5. A Strategy for Developing Stationary Biodiesel Electric Generation, Challenges; and
6. Opportunities in Developing Bioenergy Alternatives.

The participants were:

1. John Christy of the University of Alabama in Huntsville,
2. Michael Dworkin, director of Vermont Law School's Institute for Energy and the Environment,
3. Karl R. Rabago, president of Texas Renewable Energy Industries Association,
4. David M. Smolin, director of Cumberland Law School's Center for Biotechnology, Law and Ethics,
5. Michael J. Smolin, PE, principal of EXL Group, LLC, and
6. Jacqueline Lang Weaver, professor at the University of Houston Law Center.

The Brochure for the Conference may be viewed at:

=== Bioethics Methodology, 2005 ===
This Conference was hosted on Monday, March 14, 2005 at Cumberland School of Law and analyzed how secular and religious methodologies answered the previously mentioned bioethical dilemmas. The impetus for the Conference sprang from three common criticisms of the field of Bioethics that "1) basic principles of bioethics are vague and indeterminate, and provide no real answers to bioethics dilemmas...2) there is no real expertise in the field but merely the subjective answers of individual bioethicists and...3) that the mainstream bioethics field has some of the "wrong" answers to basic bioethical dilemmas..."

The Conference was sponsored by Cumberland School of Law's Center for Bioetechnology, Law and Ethics, the Cumberland Law Review and Cumberland School of Law.

It included three panels:

1. Alternative Reproduction Technologies,
2. Death and Dying, and
3. Children as Research Subjects - Grimes v. Kennedy Krieger Institute Inc., 366 Md. 29, 782 A.2d 807 (Md. 2001).

The participants were:

1. Janet Dolgin, JD, law professor, Hofstra University School of Law
2. L. Jack Nelson III, JD, LLM, law professor, Cumberland School of Law
3. Larry I. Palmer, JD, Chair of Urban Health Policy at the University of Louisville
4. Lois Shepherd, JD, professor, Florida State University College of Law and
5. David M. Smolin, JD, of Director of the biotech center, law professor, Cumberland School of Law

=== Genetically Modified Foods, 2004 ===
This Conference was hosted on Monday, March 31, 2004 at the Bradley Lecure Center, Children's Harbor Building of the University of Alabama at Birmingham.

Sponsors were Cumberland Law School's Center for Biotechnology, Law and Ethics, the Cumberland Law Review and the Center for Ethics & Values in the Sciences at the University of Alabama at Birmingham. The Conference analyzed the impact of the production and use of genetically modified foods.

It included six panels:

1. Four World views on Genetically Modified Food, or Greenpeace versus Monsanto Company,
2. Genomics-Guided Agricultural Biotechnology: Seeking a Less Politically Volatile Approach to GMO Development,
3. GMOs as an International Trade Issue: Using the World Trade Organization to Resolve an International Public Policy Conflict,
4. Can GMOs Help Developing Countries in their Quest for Food Security?,
5. The Promise and Peril of GM Agriculture in the Developing World: What Will Become of Traditional Agriculture Knowledge?, and
6. Andhra Pradesh, India, as a Case Study in Perspectives on GMOs.

=== Research with Children, 2003 ===
This conference was hosted on March 21, 2003 by the Center for Biotechnology, Law and Ethics, the Center for Ethics and Values in the Sciences at the University of Alabama at Birmingham, and the University of Alabama School of Medicine Division of Continuing Medical Education.

The Conference analyzed the ethical implications of research on children. There were four panels at the conference:

1. The Ethical Basis of the Pediatric Research Regulations - Robert Nelson, M.D., Ph.D., Chair of the Committees for the Protection of Human Subjects at the Children's Hospital of Philadelphia.
2. The Legal Basis for Pediatric Research: Issues, Trends Cases - David Smolin, J.D.,
3. Understanding the Role of Assent in Pediatric Research - Maureen Kelley, Ph.D., of the School of Public Health, UAB
4. Factors Influencing Children's Participation in Research - Marlon Broome, Ph.D., the FAAN Professor and Associate Dean for Research, School of Nursing, UAB.

The Children's research brochure may be viewed at:

== Further information ==
=== School websites ===
- Website for Cumberland School of Law
- Website for Center for Biotechnology, Law and Ethics
- Cumberland Law Library biotech resources Samford Law Library
- Cumberland School of Law - wiki
- Cumberland Law Review - wiki

=== Conference information ===
- Biofuels Conference
- Children in Research conference
- Health Care conference
- Genetically Modified Foods conference
