= William Benjamin Craig =

American politician and lawyer (1877–1925)

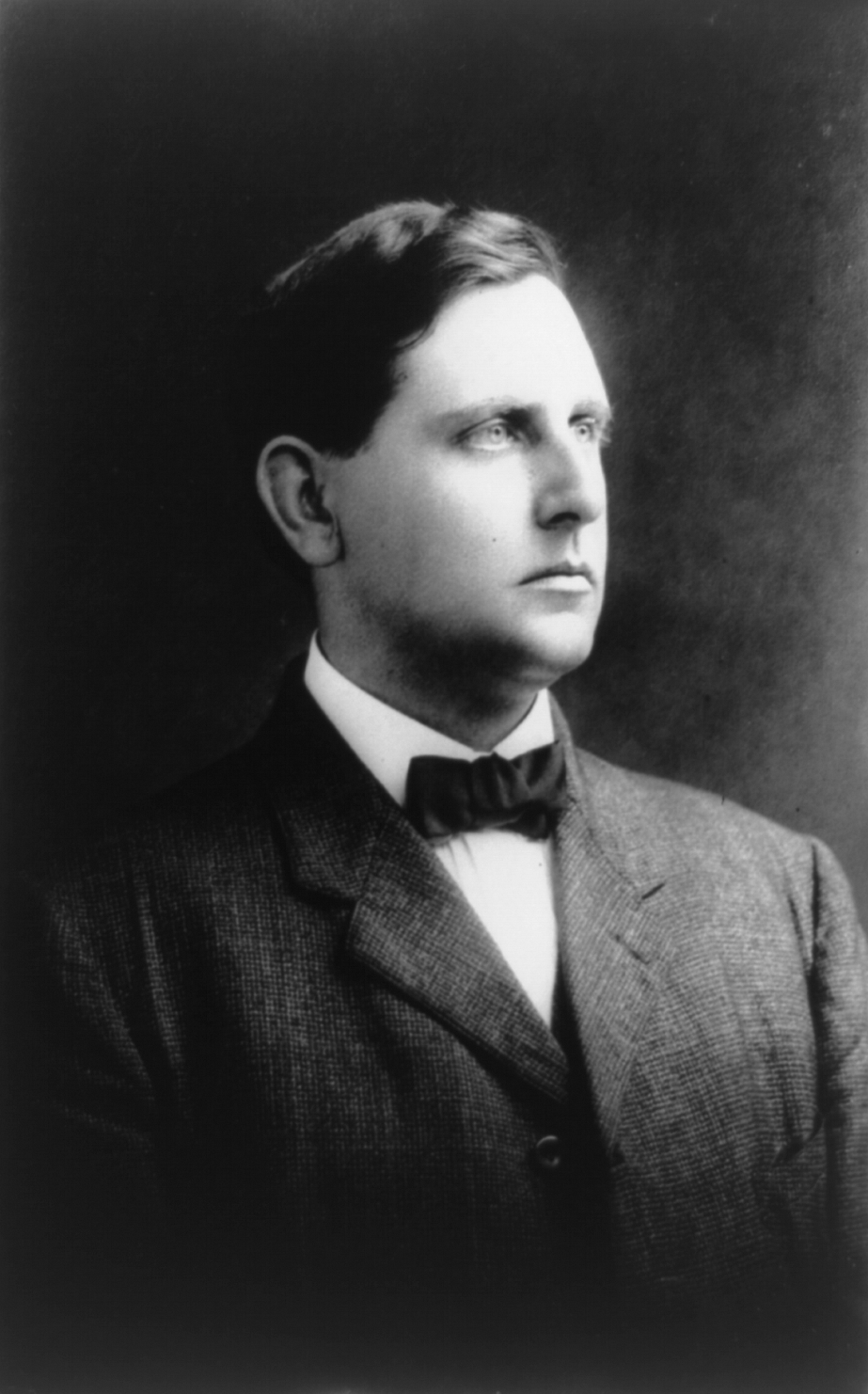
- Craig in 1908

Member of the U.S. House of Representatives from Alabama's 4th district
- In office March 4, 1907 – March 3, 1911
- Preceded by: Sydney J. Bowie
- Succeeded by: Fred L. Blackmon

Member of the Alabama Senate from the 30th district
- In office 1903–1907

Personal details
- Born: November 2, 1877 Selma, Alabama, US
- Died: November 27, 1925 (aged 48) Selma, Alabama, US
- Party: Democratic
- Relations: John White (great-grandfather)
- Parent: George Henry Craig (father)
- Occupation: Politician, lawyer

William Benjamin Craig (November 2, 1877 – November 27, 1925) was an American politician and lawyer. A Democrat, he was a member of the United States House of Representatives from Alabama.

== Early life and education ==
Craig was born on November 2, 1877, in Selma, Alabama, one of six children born to George Henry Craig and Sarah Alvena (née White) Craig. Other sources claim he was born in Cahaba or Tennessee. His maternal great-grandfather was John White, who was a justice of the Supreme Court of Alabama.

Educated at public schools, Craig was an apprentice machinist for the Southern Railway in Selma, from 1893 to 1897, simultaneously reading law. He then studied at the Cumberland School of Law, during which he was a member of Kappa Sigma, graduating in 1898. He was admitted to the Alabama State Bar on June 29 of that year.

== Career ==
He began practicing under Craig & Craig, alongside his father. He worked on bankruptcy cases from August 1898 to December 1901. From 1900 to 1903, he was commissioner of the United States District Court for the Middle District of Alabama. He was a non-commissioned private in the First Cavalry Unit of the Alabama National Guard in 1896 and 1897; he later re-enlisted, serving as a captain in the Second Infantry Unit from April 1903, until his resignation in October.

Craig was a Democrat. He was a member of the Alabama Senate from 1903 to 1907, representing the 30th district. While serving, he was a member of the Committees on Privileges and Elections and on Rules.

Craig was a member of the United States House of Representatives, from March 4, 1907, to March 3, 1911, representing Alabama's 4th district. During his tenure, he was a member of the Committees on Alcoholic and Liquor Traffic; on Expenditures in the State Department; and on Public Lands. In the election for his second term, he defeated J. Osmond Middleton with double his votes. He refused nomination for the following election.

Ideologically, Craig leaned liberal. He supported progressive policies. He supported Prohibition, with him, in his first Congressional term, planning to propose a bill to ban alcohol consumption in Washington, D.C. He opposed the Payne–Aldrich Tariff Act. He proposed bills to better waterways in Alabama. He supported improving National Guard training.

After serving in Congress, Craig returned to practicing law in Selma, partnering with his father and his brother, Bruce K. Craig.

== Personal life and death ==
On December 2, 1903, Craig married Irene Kunst, with whom he had two children. He was Presbyterian, as well as a member of Kiwanis. He died on November 27, 1925, aged 48, in Selma, and was buried at the Old Live Oak Cemetery, in Selma.

U.S. House of Representatives
Preceded by Sydney J. Bowie	Member of the U.S. House of Representatives from Alabama's 4th congressional district 1907–1911	Succeeded by Fred L. Blackmon
