= John L. Carroll =

American judge (1943–2023)

- Carroll in 2006

Magistrate Judge of the U.S. District Court for the Middle District of Alabama
- In office 1986–2001
- Preceded by: Joel Fredrick Dubina
- Succeeded by: Delores R. Boyd

Personal details
- Born: John Lawrence Carroll; October 19, 1943 Washington, D.C., U.S.
- Died: August 14, 2023 (aged 79) Birmingham, Alabama, U.S.
- Spouse: Susan Gaskins (m. 1970)
- Children: 1
- Education: Tufts University (BEc); Samford University (JD); Harvard University (LLM)

Military service
- Branch/service: United States Marine Corps
- Years of service: 1965–1969
- Rank: Captain
- Battles/wars: Vietnam War

John Lawrence Carroll (October 19, 1943 – August 14, 2023) was an American judge and academic administrator who was a U.S. magistrate judge for the Middle District of Alabama from 1986 to 2001. He was also a member of the Judicial Conference of the United States's Federal Rules of Civil Procedure. He served as the dean of the Cumberland School of Law in Homewood, Alabama, from 2001 to 2014.

== Early life and military service ==
John Lawrence Carroll was a native of Washington, D.C., born there on October 19, 1943, into a Catholic family of Irish descent. He graduated from Gonzaga College High School, a Jesuit academy in the District of Columbia, in 1961. He went on to attend Tufts University, attaining a bachelor's degree in economics in 1965. Afterwards, Carroll entered the military and served as a Marine flight officer during the Vietnam War, where he flew over 200 combat missions, more than 100 of which were in North Vietnam. He received an honorable discharge from the Marine Corps in 1969 at the rank of captain.

== Law career ==
After leaving the Marine Corps, Carroll briefly worked as a furniture salesman, during which he went across the country and found a calling for law after visiting housing projects in Chicago. He graduated from the Cumberland School of Law at Samford University, a Baptist college, in 1974, magna cum laude, having served as member of the Cumberland Law Review, on national moot court team and as student bar president.

Upon completing law school, Carroll entered the Master of Laws program at Harvard Law School, where he studied constitutional law. He also applied for a staff position at the Southern Poverty Law Center, and worked his first case with the SPLC representing an African-American former Marine sergeant accused of a double murder; he and his co-workers were nearly "run off the road" by local residents who were angry that the defendant did not receive the death penalty. Carroll mainly worked with the SPLC on civil rights class-action lawsuits, as well as cases like Pugh v. Locke, which challenged Alabama's treatment of imprisoned people. Pugh v. Locke led to a federal takeover of Alabama's prison system, which Carroll credited with security improvements and better access to mental health care in Alabama's prisons, which were notoriously violent and over-crowded in the 1970s. Carroll became legal director of the Southern Poverty Law Center in 1975, serving for nine years. Carroll later said of his time with the SPLC that he wanted to commit himself with "both excellence and to making a difference".

When Carroll stepped down as legal director at the Southern Poverty Law Center, he entered private practice and spent two years on the law faculty at Mercer University's Walter F. George School of Law. He was also a member of the adjunct faculty at the University of Alabama School of Law. In 1986, he applied for an opening in the U.S. magistrate position at the Middle District of Alabama's court. He was ultimately selected for the position and served as a federal trial judge until 2001. Carroll also worked with the Federal Judicial Center, where he chaired the Magistrate Judges' Education Committee, overseeing the training of other magistrate judges. Carroll was appointed by chief justice William Rehnquist to serve on the Judicial Conference of the United States's Federal Rules of Civil Procedure, which analyzes and makes recommendations to the United States Supreme Court and the United States Congress for federal rule changes.

== Academic career ==
In 2001, Carroll retired as U.S. magistrate to accept a nomination as dean of the Cumberland School of Law, his alma mater. Carroll served as dean from 2001 to 2014, one of the longest tenured law school deans in the United States. During his time as dean, the Cumberland School of Law improved its trial advocacy program, which became ranked fourth nationally in 2012. Carroll also cited strong alumni participation, teaching practical legal skills and outreach efforts as accomplishments he was proud of during his tenure.

Carroll resigned as dean to focus on full-time teaching in 2014. As a professor, he taught courses at Cumberland relating to legal mediation, evidence, trial practice, ethics and professionalism, and e-discovery. In October 2014, he became acting director of the Alabama Ethics Commission following the retirement of Jim Sumner. He was succeeded in that position by Tom Albritton in April 2015. Carroll was also a member of the Alabama Access to Justice Commission and the Alabama Professionalism Commission.

While at the Cumberland School of Law, Carroll continued to be involved in special legal cases. In 2016, he was selected by the Judicial Inquiry Commission to prosecute former judge Roy Moore in an ethics trial. Moore's attorney, Mat Staver, attempted to dispute the nomination, citing Carroll's history with the Southern Poverty Law Center, as the SPLC had filed complaints regarding Moore, claiming it was a conflict of interest. Rosa Davis, an attorney for the Judicial Inquiry Commission, dismissed Staver's complaint, saying that Carroll had "quite a resume" since his time with the SPLC over 32 years prior. Moore was eventually suspended as chief justice of the Alabama Supreme Court in the case, with Carroll saying that Moore had "continue[d] to defy the law".

In 2020, Carroll launched the Cumberland Veterans Legal Assistance Clinic (C-VETS), serving as the veteran organization's supervising attorney. Carroll retired from teaching as a professor in 2022.

== Personal life ==
Carroll met his wife Susan Gaskins while serving in the Marine Corps; after leaving Vietnam, he was stationed at Marine Corps Air Station Cherry Point in North Carolina, where he was set up for a blind date with Gaskins. The couple married in 1970, a year after they met, and had one daughter together.

Outside of his legal career, Carroll was an active cyclist, runner and guitarist. As dean, he annually challenged his students in the Susan G. Komen Cure for Cancer Run, promising to buy dinner for any student who could beat him in the race. Carroll died on August 14, 2023; his death was announced by Samford University the same day. He was 79.
