= Ashby Pate =

American lawyer

R. Ashby Pate
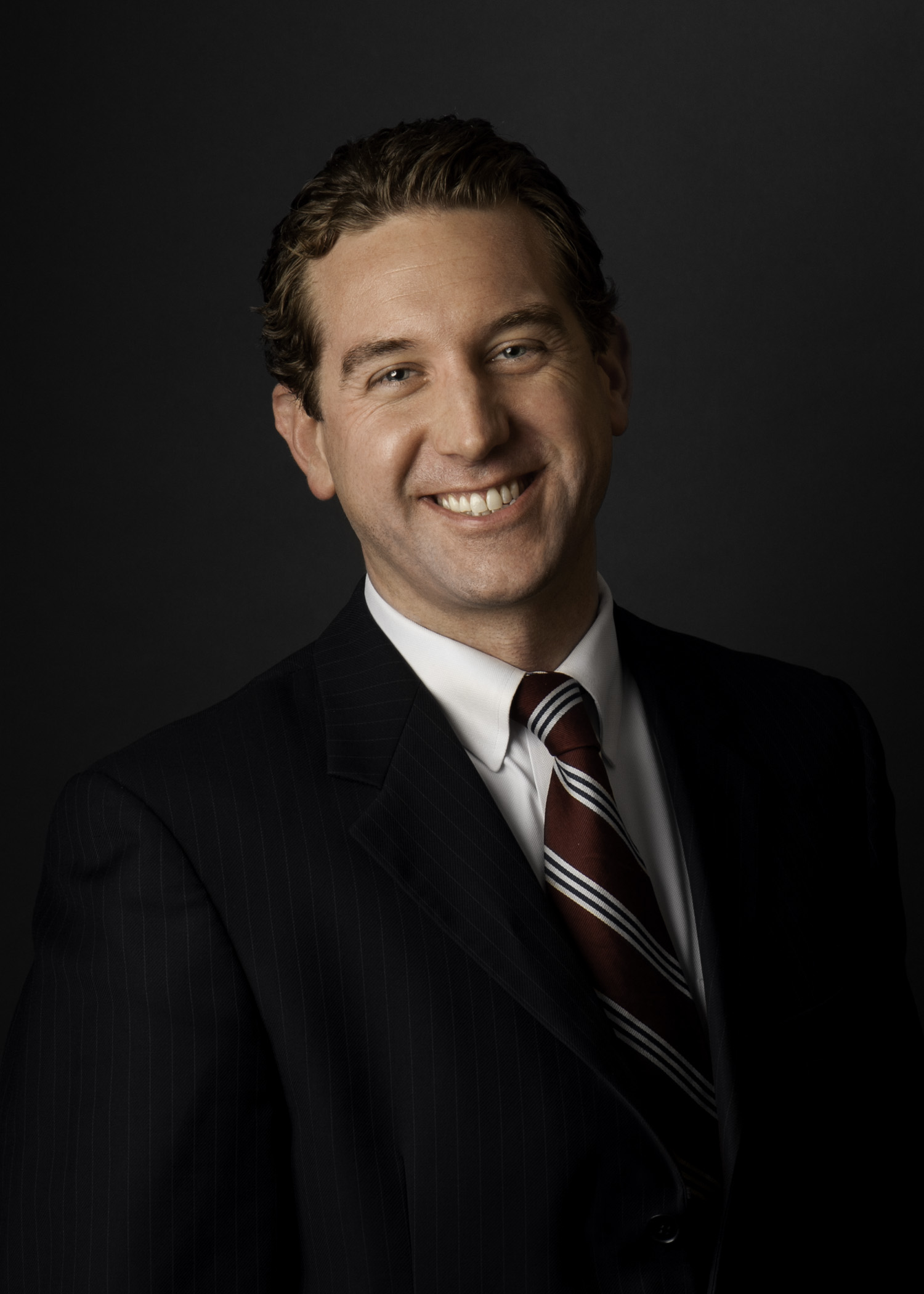

Associate Justice of the Supreme Court of Palau
- In office 2013–2016
- Appointed by: President Johnson Toribiong
- Preceded by: Associate Justice Alexandra Foster

Personal details
- Born: Robert Ashby Pate; March 20, 1978 (age 48) Birmingham, Alabama
- Education: University of Colorado Boulder; Samford University; University of East Anglia

Robert Ashby Pate (born March 20, 1978) is an American lawyer with the law firm of Lightfoot, Franklin & White LLC and a former Associate Justice of the Supreme Court of Palau.

== Judicial service ==
As one of four justices on the Republic's highest court, Pate presided over several hundred civil and criminal cases as a trial judge and served as a panelist on over 40 civil and criminal appeals. Pate was appointed to the Court at the age of 34 by President Johnson Toribiong.

In 2014, Pate's order granting a writ of habeas corpus in In re Angelino, which condemned the solitary confinement system in Palau's only correctional facility, garnered attention in the Asia-Pacific region and among noted international human rights advocates as "an impressive national court application of international human rights norms".

In 2009, while serving as Senior Court Counsel for the Palau Supreme Court, Pate also helped establish Palau's first jury trial system.

== Legal career ==
After law school, Pate served as a Law Clerk to U. W. Clemon of the United States District Court, Northern District of Alabama, Alabama's first African-American federal judge.

In 2016, Pate joined Lightfoot where his practice focuses on international disputes, appellate work, and general commercial litigation. Pate was appointed as co-prosecutor in the 2016 judicial ethics trial of Alabama's "Ten Commandments" judge, Chief Justice Roy Moore. He delivered closing arguments in the trial, arguing that the Chief Justice had defied the U.S. Supreme Court’s same-sex marriage decision in Obergefell v. Hodges. In a unanimous verdict, the Alabama Court of the Judiciary suspended the Chief Justice from office for the remainder of his elected term, without pay.

== Publications and lectures ==
In 2016-2017, Pate delivered a series of lectures entitled Be The Light to numerous organizations across the country. Other presentations and publications include:

—Be the Light, Presentation to the American College of Trial Lawyers, Spring Meeting (2016), Maui, HI.

—The Future of Harmonization: Soft Law Instruments and the Principled Advance of International Lawmaking, 13 Touro Int’l L. Rev. 2, 142 (2010) (author).

—The Big Wet Now: Observations for Young Internationalists, Presentation to the Dean Rusk Center for International Law and Policy, University of Georgia School of Law (2013) (lecture).

—The Clear Opener: How to avoid mucking up the most crucial part of discourse, Bryan A. Garner, The American Bar Association Journal (August 2014)(interviewed and cited by Mr. Garner on judicial order writing and Federal Judicial Center training).

== Education ==
Pate graduated summa cum laude from the University of Colorado Boulder with a B.A. in English in 2000. Pate graduated magna cum laude from Samford University's Cumberland School of Law, where he also served as Editor-in-Chief of the Law Review. Pate earned his LL.M. in International Commercial and Business Law in 2010 from the University of East Anglia where he graduated first in his class and was awarded the Sir Roy Goode Prize in international law.
