= Lamar Jeffers =

American politician (1888–1983)

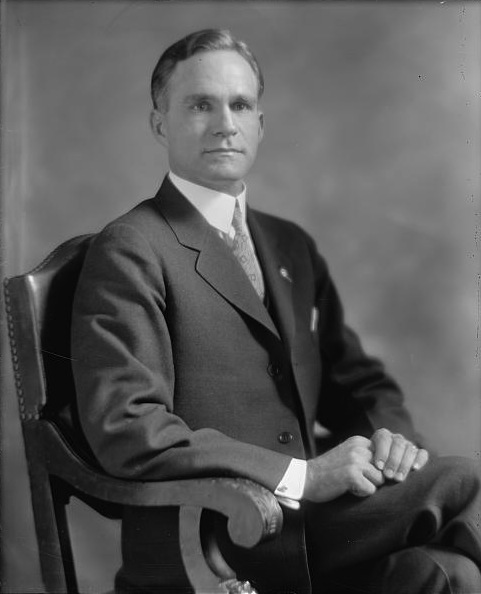

Member of the U.S. House of Representatives from Alabama's 4th district
- In office June 7, 1921 – January 3, 1935
- Preceded by: Fred Blackmon
- Succeeded by: Sam Hobbs

Personal details
- Born: April 16, 1888 Anniston, Alabama, U.S.
- Died: June 1, 1983 (aged 95) Daytona Beach, Florida, U.S.
- Resting place: Arlington National Cemetery
- Party: Democratic Party
- Education: Alabama Presbyterian College at Anniston

Lamar Jeffers (April 16, 1888 – June 1, 1983) was an American World War I veteran and politician who served seven terms as a U.S. representative from Alabama from 1921 to 1935.

== Biography ==
Born in Anniston, Alabama, Jeffers attended public schools and Alabama Presbyterian College at Anniston.

He served with the Alabama National Guard from 1904 to 1914. He served as clerk of the circuit court of Calhoun County, taking office in January 1917.

=== World War I ===
Jeffers resigned that office in May 1917 and entered the U.S. Army, serving with the Eighty-second Division in France. He was awarded the Distinguished Service Cross by the United States Government. He was promoted to rank of major of infantry.

=== Congress ===
Jeffers was elected as a Democrat to the Sixty-seventh Congress to fill the vacancy caused by the death of Fred L. Blackmon. He was reelected to the Sixty-eighth and to the five succeeding Congresses and served from June 7, 1921, to January 3, 1935.

He served as chairman of the Committee on Civil Service (Seventy-second and Seventy-third Congresses). He was an unsuccessful candidate for renomination in 1934.

=== Retirement and death ===
Resided in Daytona Beach, Florida, until his death there on June 1, 1983. He was interred at Arlington National Cemetery.

U.S. House of Representatives
Preceded by Fred L. Blackmon	Member of the U.S. House of Representatives from Alabama's 4th congressional district June 7, 1921 – January 3, 1935	Succeeded by Sam Hobbs
