= Sam Hobbs =

American politician

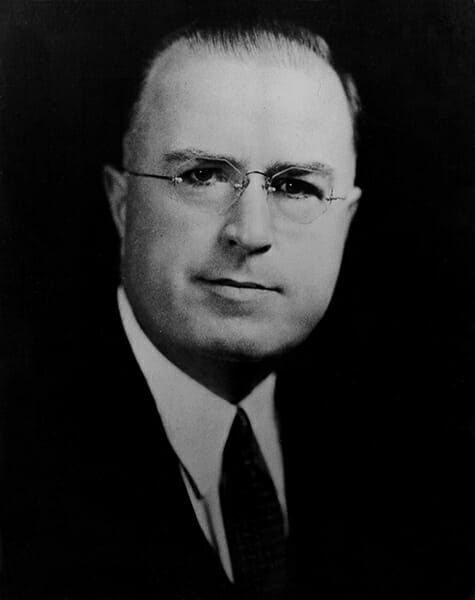

Member of the U.S. House of Representatives from Alabama's 4th district
- In office January 3, 1935 – January 3, 1951
- Preceded by: Lamar Jeffers
- Succeeded by: Kenneth A. Roberts

Personal details
- Born: Samuel Francis Hobbs; October 5, 1887 Selma, Alabama
- Died: May 31, 1952 (aged 64) Selma, Alabama
- Party: Democratic

Samuel Francis Hobbs (October 5, 1887 – May 31, 1952) was a United States representative from Alabama.

== Biography ==
Born in Selma, Alabama, Hobbs attended the public schools, Callaway's Preparatory School, Marion (Alabama) Military Institute, and Vanderbilt University at Nashville, Tennessee, graduating from the law department of the University of Alabama at Tuscaloosa in 1908. He was admitted to the bar in 1908 and commenced practice in Selma. He was appointed judge of the fourth judicial circuit of Alabama in 1921.

Hobbs was elected to the same office in 1923 and served until his resignation in 1926. He then resumed the practice of law. He served as chairman of the Muscle Shoals Commission in 1931 and of the Alabama National Recovery Administration Committee in 1933.

Hobbs was elected as a Democrat to the Seventy-fourth and to the seven succeeding Congresses (January 3, 1935 – January 3, 1951).

Hobbs was one of the managers appointed by the House of Representatives in 1936 to conduct the impeachment proceedings against Halsted L. Ritter, judge of the United States District Court for the Southern District of Florida.

Beginning in 1939, Hobbs introduced legislation providing for the indefinite detention of foreign citizens convicted of certain crimes who could not be deported to their home countries, what critics labeled a "Concentration Camp Bill." A version of this legislation was ultimately folded into the McCarran Internal Security Act of 1950.

Throughout his congressional service, Hobbs was closely allied with J. Edgar Hoover, head of the Federal Bureau of Investigation (FBI). Hobbs was advised by Hoover aide Alexander Holtzoff, who called himself "Hobbs's brain trust." In 1941, at the behest of Hoover, Hobbs introduced a bill that would have legalized wiretapping by the FBI, or any other government agency, if it was suspected that a felony was occurring. The bill was supported by Attorney General Robert H. Jackson, and seemed likely to pass, until Federal Communications Commission (FCC) chairman James Lawrence Fly testified against the bill in Congress, and it did not pass. The conflict was much discussed in the national news. Hobbs also passed a bill that would have deported labour leader Harry Bridges. The case was appealed to the U.S. Supreme Court where the deportation order was canceled.

Sam Hobbs successfully introduced the Hobbs Act of 1946, which criminalized at least three distinct forms of criminal conduct: robbery, extortion by force, fear or threat, and extortion under color of law. Codified in 18 U.S.C. § 1951, it is frequently used today in federal prosecutions. Hobbs formed a friendship with Archibald Clark Kerr, 1st Baron Inverchapel while living in Washington DC.

Hobbs did not seek renomination in 1950, but returned to Selma, Alabama and reestablished his law practice. He died in Selma in 1952 and was interred in Live Oak Cemetery.

U.S. House of Representatives
Preceded by Lamar Jeffers	Member of the U.S. House of Representatives from Alabama's 4th congressional district 1935–1951	Succeeded by Kenneth A. Roberts
