= Fred L. Blackmon =

American politician (1873–1921)

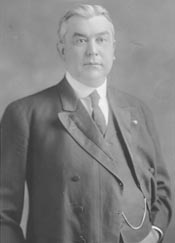

Member of the U.S. House of Representatives from Alabama's 4th district
- In office March 4, 1911 – February 8, 1921
- Preceded by: William B. Craig
- Succeeded by: Lamar Jeffers

Member of the Alabama Senate
- In office 1900-1910

Personal details
- Born: September 15, 1873 Lime Branch, Georgia
- Died: February 8, 1921 (aged 47) Bartow, Florida
- Party: Democratic Party

Fred Leonard Blackmon (September 15, 1873 – February 8, 1921) was a U.S. representative from Alabama.

Born at Lime Branch, Georgia, Blackmon moved with his parents to Calhoun County, Alabama, in 1883. He attended the public schools in DeArmanville and Choccolocco, the State normal college at Jacksonville, Alabama (now Jacksonville State University, Douglasville (Georgia) College, and Mountain City Business College, Chattanooga, Tennessee. He graduated from the law department of the University of Alabama at Tuscaloosa in 1894. He was admitted to the bar in the same year and commenced practice in Anniston, Alabama. Blackmon served as city attorney for Anniston from 1898 until 1902, and served as member of the State senate from 1900 until 1910. He served as chairman of the congressional committee for the fourth Alabama district from 1906 until 1910, when he resigned.

Blackmon was elected as a Democrat to the Sixty-second and to the four succeeding Congresses and served from March 4, 1911. Blackmon had also been reelected to the Sixty-seventh Congress, but died in Bartow, Florida, on February 8, 1921. He was interred in the Hillside Cemetery, Anniston, Alabama.

== See also ==
- List of members of the United States Congress who died in office (1900–1949)

U.S. House of Representatives
Preceded by William B. Craig	Member of the U.S. House of Representatives from Alabama's 4th congressional district March 4, 1911 – February 8, 1921	Succeeded by Lamar Jeffers
