= Cambodian adoption scandal =

Adoption fraud case in Cambodia

- Date: 1997–2001
- Location: Cambodia and the United States
- Outcome: U.S. suspension of adoptions from Cambodia
- Charges: Conspiracy to commit visa fraud, conspiracy to commit money laundering, structuring of financial transactions
- Convictions: Lauryn Galindo; Lynn Devin
- Sentence: 18 months of imprisonment for Galindo; 6 months of home detention for Devin

The Cambodian adoption scandal was an international adoption fraud case involving Lauryn Galindo, an American adoption facilitator, and her sister Lynn Devin, who ran the Seattle company Seattle International Adoptions. Between January 1997 and December 2001 the two arranged the adoption of hundreds of Cambodian children by American families, telling United States immigration authorities that children were orphans or had been abandoned when they had not. Both women pleaded guilty to federal charges. Galindo was sentenced in November 2004 to 18 months in prison, and Devin a month later to six months of home detention. The United States had suspended adoptions from Cambodia in December 2001.

== Background ==
Seattle International Adoptions was the largest American agency handling adoptions of Cambodian children, and it described its work as humanitarian. Devin ran the company from Mercer Island, Washington, and recruited the adoptive parents. Galindo lived in Hanalei, Kauai, and handled the Cambodian side, dealing with government officials there and taking arriving parents to orphanages; the parents paid her for that service.

A statement issued by U.S. Immigration and Customs Enforcement at the time of Galindo's sentencing said that between January 1997 and December 2001 the two had defrauded American citizens who adopted some 700 children from Cambodia, taking in about $8 million from adoptive parents. (Note: Sources differ on the number of children. The ICE figure of about 700 is also reported by ABC News and The Washington Post; Vice gives about 800.) According to Vice, that was around half the Cambodian children adopted into the United States in those years.

Adopting parents were charged as much as $10,500 per child, while birth families in Cambodia received as little as $100 and were often paid only in rice. Some of those families understood that their children were going away to boarding school; others were told the Americans would pay them thousands of dollars.

== Investigation and prosecution ==
According to E. J. Graff in The Washington Post, the Immigration and Naturalization Service halted adoptions from Cambodia in December 2001 and began a criminal investigation after a Cambodian human rights organization and the Phnom Penh Post published findings on baby-buying and abduction in Galindo's operations and in others.

Devin pleaded guilty to related charges in December 2003. On January 8, 2004, the Department of Justice announced that Galindo had surrendered and appeared in Seattle on an indictment charging one count of conspiracy to commit visa fraud and four counts of visa fraud. Prosecutors said the conspiracy had run from January 1997 to January 1999, and that Galindo, Devin and Seattle International Adoptions had obtained visas for Cambodian children by misstating who the children were, or whether they were orphans or had been abandoned. Investigators from the Bureau of Immigration and Customs Enforcement and the Internal Revenue Service had worked on the case for two years.

One count concerned a four-year-old girl who was living with her mother. Galindo had written on the girl's file that the father was dead and the mother very poor, and the adopting parents were told to give the mother $100 and to donate $3,500 to an orphanage in Kampong Speu. The visa paperwork recorded no known parents or relatives.

Galindo pleaded guilty on June 23, 2004, to conspiracy to commit visa fraud, conspiracy to launder money, and structuring of financial transactions. (Note: The Spokesman-Review and the Phnom Penh Post both place the guilty plea in July 2004. The date used here follows the Justice Department's announcement.) Both sisters agreed to forfeit what they had made from the company. Prosecutors said associates of Galindo had been buying infants from impoverished mothers, and that the evidence indicated she knew of it.

Galindo was sentenced on November 19, 2004, to 18 months in prison, three years of supervised release and 300 hours of community service. She was also ordered to give up a $1.4 million house in Hawaii and to pay more than $60,000 in restitution to seven sets of adoptive parents. U.S. District Judge Thomas Zilly told her that her conduct toward children taken from their families "far outweighs all the other good work you did for other children." Galindo said in a statement that she had never trafficked in children.

Prosecutors said there was no evidence that Devin had known babies were being bought from their parents, though she was aware that a substitute child was sometimes sent when an intended adoption fell through. She had given investigators information about her sister, and at sentencing the court treated her as the less culpable of the two. Zilly said that by all indications her "motivation was not money or greed". Devin was sentenced in December 2004 to six months of house arrest under electronic monitoring and to more than $150,000 in financial penalties.

== Aftermath ==
The suspension of adoptions remained in place while the prosecutions ran their course, and Cambodian children continued to be adopted into other countries. The Justice Department said it would do nothing to put at risk the immigration status of children already brought to the United States through the company.

How many of the children the operation placed were orphans has never been determined. Some of the adoptees have since tried to trace their birth families and have questioned their own adoption records. Galindo told Vice in 2022 that she had not set out to commit a crime and that the problem "did not start with me".
