= Cumberland School of Law =

Law school in Homewood, Alabama, US

- Motto: E Cineribus Resurgo; I rise from the ashes
- Parent school: Samford University
- Established: July 29, 1847; 178 years ago
- School type: Private law school
- Dean: Blake Hudson
- Location: Homewood, Alabama, U.S. 33.46570°N 86.79214°W
- Enrollment: 449
- Faculty: 20 (full-time) 62 (part-time)
- USNWR ranking: 103rd (tie) (2024)
- Bar pass rate: 78.36% (2023 first-time takers)
- Website: samford.edu/cumberlandlaw

The Cumberland School of Law is an ABA-accredited law school at Samford University in Homewood, Alabama, United States. It was founded in 1847 at Cumberland University in Lebanon, Tennessee, and is the 11th oldest law school in the United States.

The school offers two degree programs: the 90-hour Juris Doctor (J.D.), and the Master of Comparative Law (M.C.L.), which is designed to educate foreign lawyers in the basic legal principles of the United States. The school also offers eight dual-degree programs and a Master of Laws (LL.M) program with concentrations in financial service regulatory compliance, health law and policy, higher education law and compliance, and legal project management.

Cumberland Law School is unrelated to the University of the Cumberlands in Williamsburg, Kentucky, and is no longer a part of Cumberland University in Lebanon, Tennessee.

== History ==
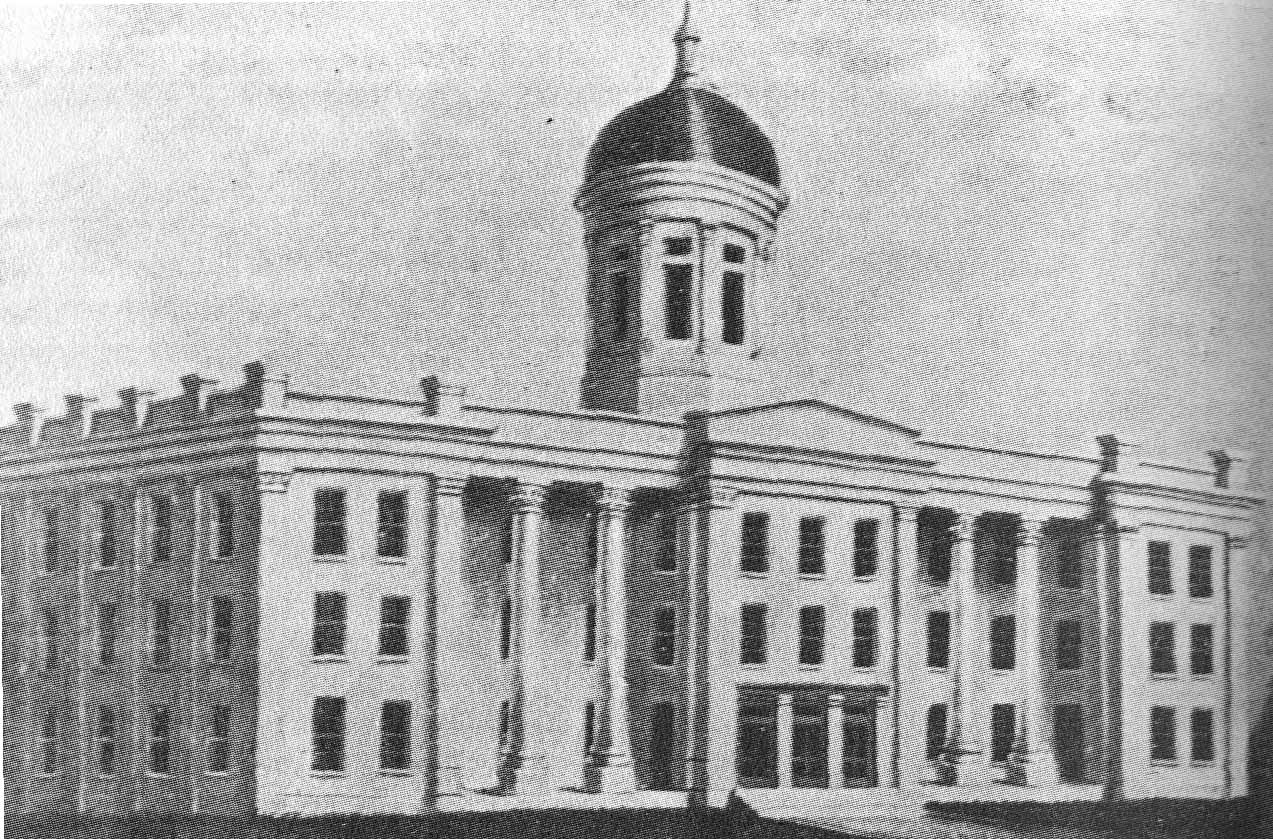
Cumberland University c.1858. Burned during the American Civil War.

This summary is based on From Maverick to Mainstream, a review of Cumberland's history and the development of the American legal education system.

Langum and Walthall summarize the history of Cumberland Law School as:

From its very local, Tennessee origins in 1847, Cumberland...emerged as a premier law school with a national status. It excelled in faculty, teaching methodology, and numbers of students. Following the American Civil War, Cumberland rebuilt itself and ultimately succeeded on a grand scale with its single-year curriculum.

=== Early years and founding ===
Cumberland School of Law was founded on July 29, 1847 in Lebanon, Tennessee at Cumberland University. At the end of 1847, there were 15 law schools in the United States.

Prior to the law school's official founding, Cumberland University facilitated the study of law and admitted a diverse student body, evidenced by graduates such as George W. Harkins, a Choctaw chief, who received a law degree from Cumberland and became a judge in 1834.

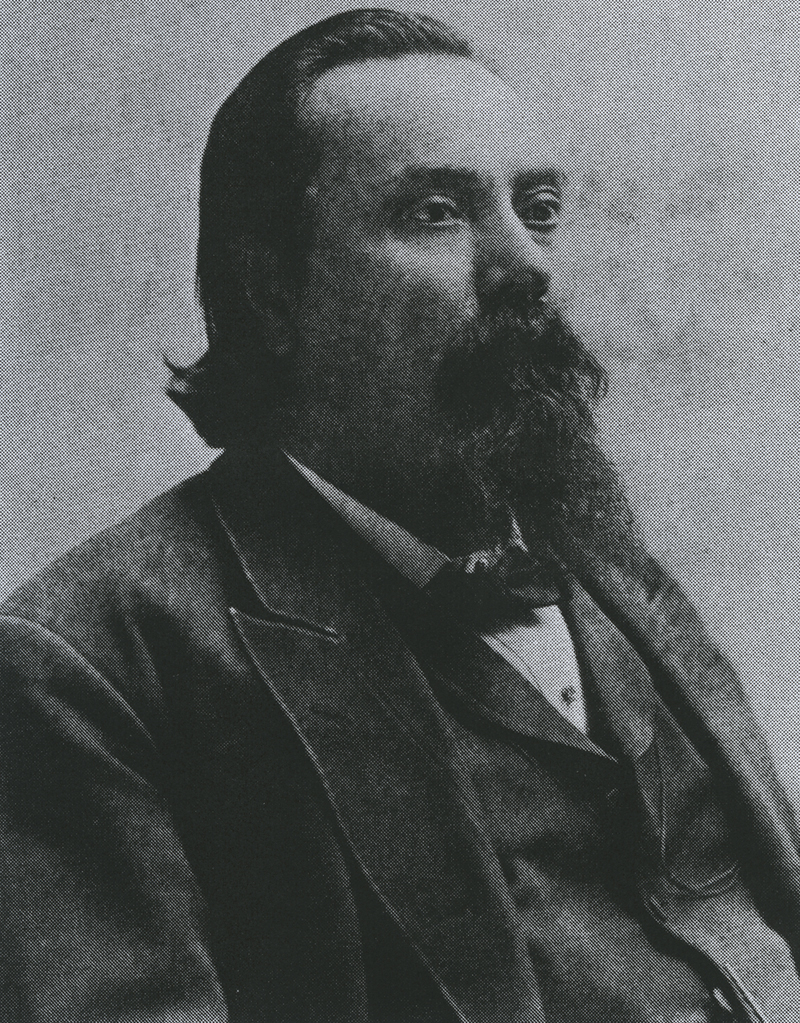
George W. Harkins, a Choctaw chief and graduate of Cumberland University

=== Antebellum years ===
Prior to the founding of the United States' first law schools, the primary means for a legal education was apprenticeship. Establishing law schools was difficult in the early 19th century. Harvard was only able to reestablish its law school in 1829 and Yale in 1826. By 1859, Cumberland, Harvard, and the University of Virginia School of Law were the three largest law schools in the United States. A year later, in 1860, only 21 university law schools existed in the country, and, in no school did the curriculum extend beyond two years.

During the Antebellum years, Cumberland enjoyed success. Nathan Green Jr., son of then professor Nathan Green Sr., stated that Cumberland enjoyed "the highest degree of prosperity", with a beautiful 20-acre (81,000 m^{2}) campus, picturesque trees and fences, and fine architecture. Cumberland's first graduate Paine Page Prim ultimately became chief justice of the Oregon Supreme Court.

Students were taught through reading treatises, approximately two hours worth of recitations each morning, and a mandatory moot court program. Caruthers considered the law a science and the Socratic Method a necessity. The cost was $50 a session and a $5 "contingent fee". After the Civil War, this treatise method, the legal formalism of the school's approach, and Nathan Green Jr.'s unwillingness to make changes, were all considered reasons for Cumberland's drift out of the mainstream.

=== Civil war ===
At the start of the American Civil War, the campus split within a week; some students joined the northern army; many joined the southern. Nathan Green Jr.'s father, a law professor, went home, but in fear of arrest, Abraham Caruthers fled to Marietta, Georgia, where he died a year later.

During the war, professors John Carter and Nathan Green Jr. fought as Confederate officers. Carter was killed, but Green survived. The campus did not. The trees were cut down and fences destroyed and burned. The Confederate Army burned the University buildings, apparently because a Confederate major was offended that Black Union soldiers had used them as barracks.

=== Reconstruction ===
The law school began the slow process of rebuilding. In July 1866, Cumberland adopted the image of the phoenix, the mythological Egyptian bird that is reborn from its own ashes. The new motto was E Cineribus Resurgo or "I rise from the ashes."

In September 1865 classes resumed with 11 students, which soon grew to 20. The 1865 class included a Confederate General and Union colonel, enemies only a few months earlier. Nathan Green Jr. kept the school together until Henry Cooper, a circuit judge, Andrew B. Martin, and Robert L. Caruthers, brother of deceased founder Abraham Caruthers, joined the faculty. Robert Caruthers had previously served as the state attorney general and had been elected Governor of Tennessee during the war in 1863, but was never inaugurated.

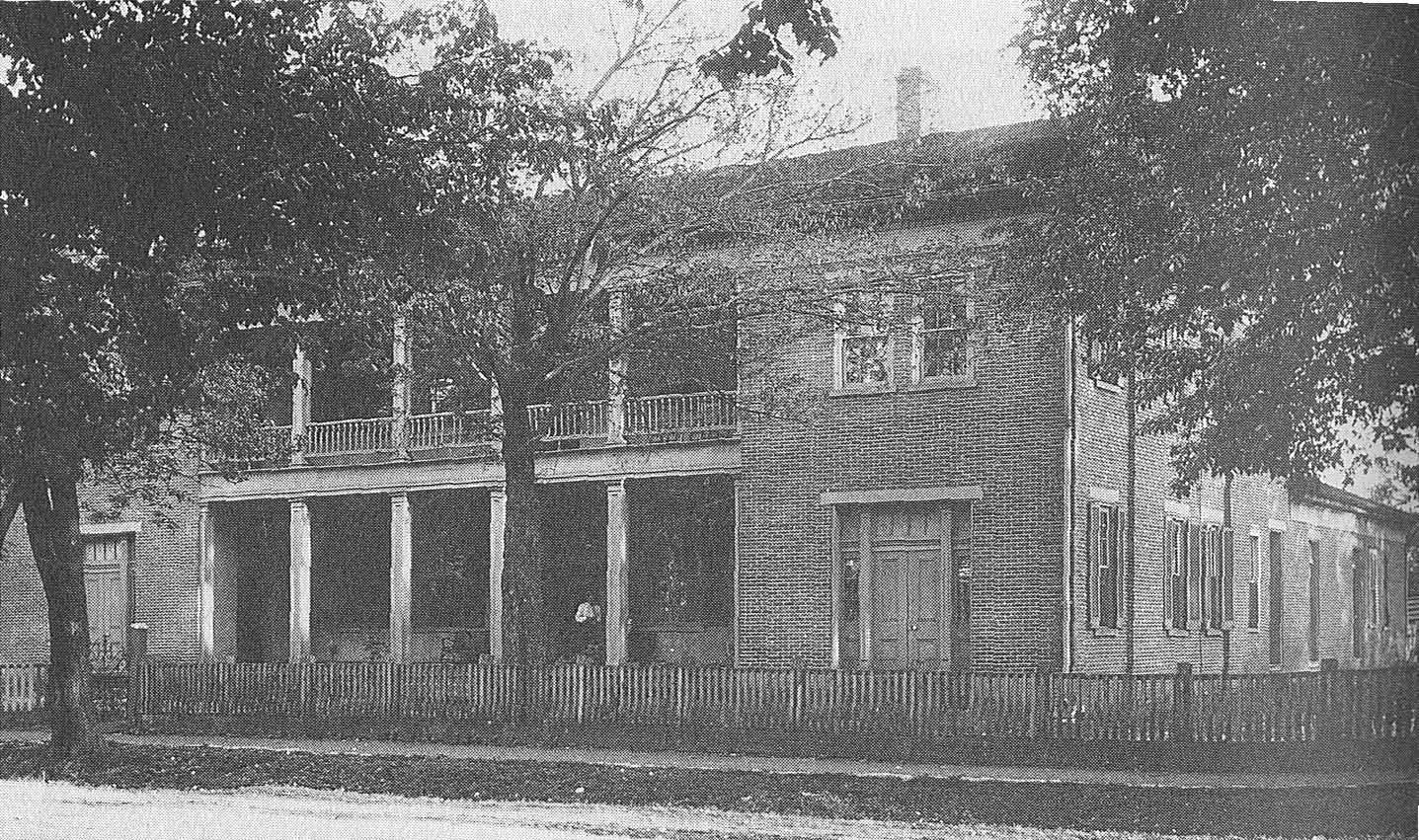
Cumberland School of Law – Corona Hall – Law School from 1873–1878

In 1873 Robert Caruthers purchased Corona Hall from the Corona Institute for Women for $10,000, which he immediately donated to the University for use by the law school.

The destruction of the campus and the devastation of war had impoverished the school, and it was almost 15 years before it saw students enter from outside the South, when a student from Illinois and a member of the Choctaw Nation enrolled at Cumberland. But there were few students from outside of the defeated Southern states, which Langum and Walthall claim underscored "how terribly the Civil War blighted Cumberland."

Robert Caruthers persisted, despite the setbacks, and in 1878 Caruthers Hall was dedicated in his honor. This new school replaced Corona Hall, which had limitations. The new hall apparently had "excellent acoustics and hard seats" and is described as a:

splendid structure, built after the latest architectural style, is nearly one hundred feet from base to spire, and contains two recitation rooms for the Law Department, two Society Halls, a Library, and a chapel whose seating capacity is about seven hundred.

=== National shift in legal education ===
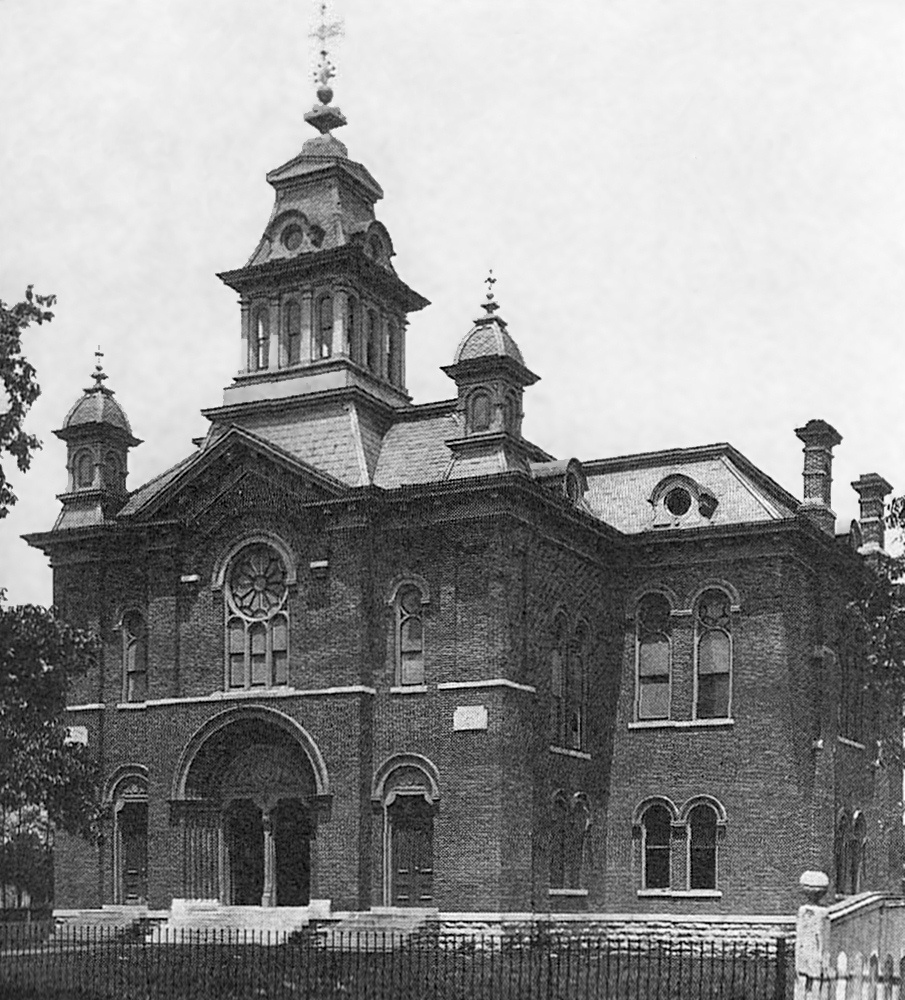
Caruthers Hall, from the Phoenix in 1903

Despite the heroic efforts to keep the school alive, Cumberland was falling into the minority at the turn of the 20th century. It maintained a one-year curriculum when other schools moved toward longer terms, and it was entrenched with legal formalism, which had reached its peak in the 1870s and would soon be on the decline. In 1876, for instance, Harvard Law School began to encourage a three-year curriculum. Through 1919, Cumberland did not adapt to the shift in legal education.

Historian Lewis L. Laska observed that:

Cumberland, which had once marked the high point of professional education, had become a captive of its own success. Unwilling to adopt modern techniques such as the case method, or to expand and deepen its curriculum by opting for the three-year standard, Cumberland became the symbol of the democratic bar.

In 1903 Nathan Green Jr. became the first dean of the law school. For the prior 57 years the school did not have this position, which was becoming more and more popular among law schools.

Cumberland first admitted women in 1901, and the library grew from 600 volumes in 1869 to 3000 in 1878. Today, the Lucille Stewart Beeson Law Library contains 300,000 volumes and microform volume equivalents.

In 1915 Cumberland refurbished its halls with an $8000 grant from the U.S. government as reparation for federal occupancy during the Civil War.

When Cordell Hull graduated from Cumberland, he commented on the diploma privilege, which granted the right to practice law without taking a bar exam, saying that

according to custom, we members of the graduating class, the moment we received our diplomas, took them to the courthouse, where a district judge awaited us. He swore us in as members of the bar. I was not 20 years old.

Cordell Hull is today honored at Cumberland with a Moot Court room bearing his name.

Cumberland eventually did adapt to the changing times, moving from Cumberland University in Lebanon, Tennessee, to Samford University in Birmingham, Alabama in 1961. It is one of a few law schools in the United States to have been sold from one university to another (others include the University of Puget Sound selling its law school to Seattle University and the Quinnipiac University School of Law, formerly part of the University of Bridgeport).

=== Planning ===
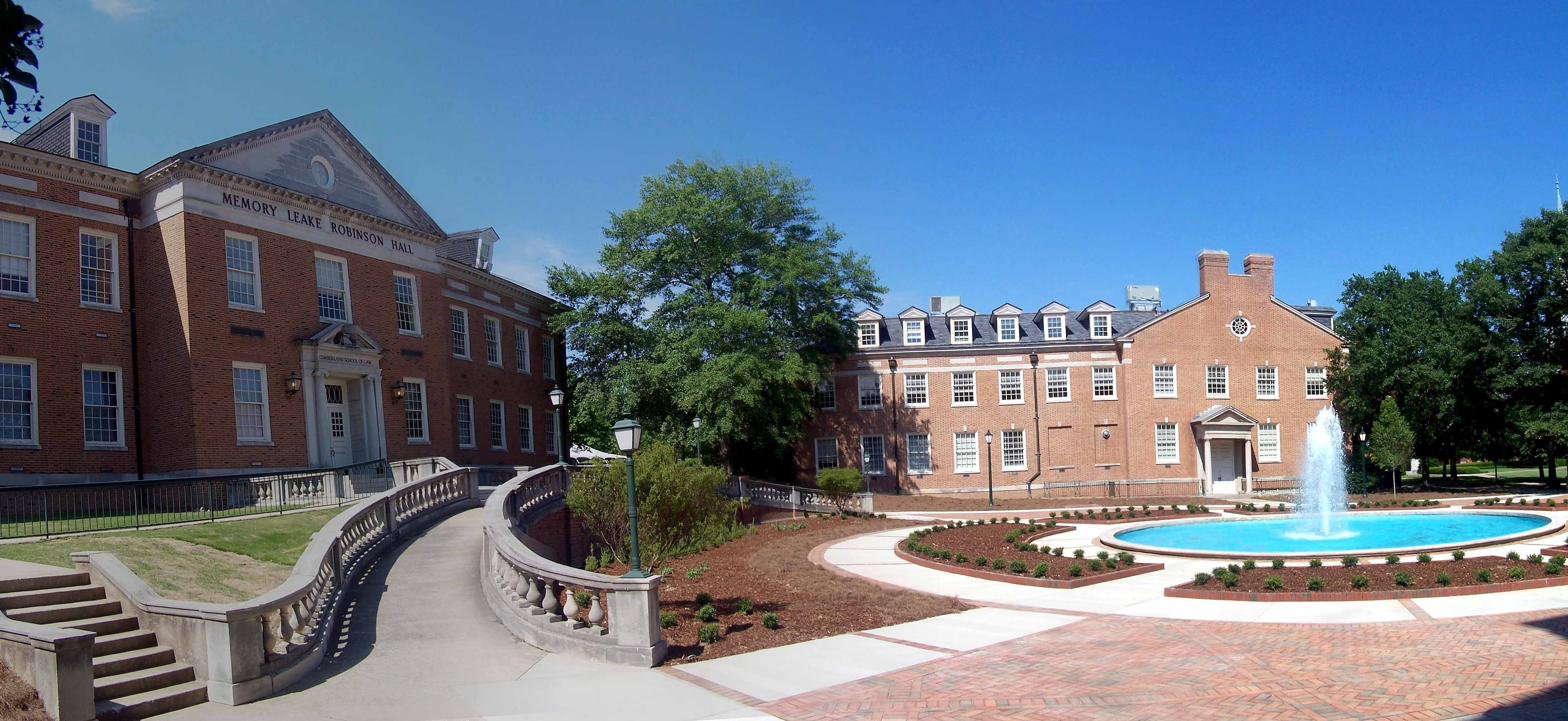
Memory Leake Robinson Hall in 2006

In December 2005 Cumberland adopted a long-term plan for the school. One call of the plan is to gradually downsize the number of students in order to provide smaller classes and closer individual attention to students. In 1995 the entering class was 212 and by 2023 that number had been reduced to 152.

Today the law school is known for its emphasis on trial advocacy and is building a biotechnology emphasis through its Biotechnology Center.

== Institution ==
Judge John L. Carroll, former dean of Cumberland, 2006 graduation ceremony

The law school emphasizes practical skills and integrity. Former dean, former federal judge John L. Carroll (class of '74), has stated that:

The prevailing philosophy is simple: Practical skill outweighs raw knowledge, and application transcends erudition. If the goal were to produce great law students, the tenets might be exactly the opposite. Our goal is to produce exceptional lawyers. That's why Cumberland’s curriculum emphasizes the core competencies of legal practice: research, writing and persuasion.

=== Curriculum ===
The first-year required classes are Civil Procedure, Contracts, Property, Torts, Criminal Law, and Evidence. Students are divided into one of three sections, where the students remain together in their respective classes for the entire first year. First-year students are also enrolled in smaller sections for Lawyering and Legal Reasoning, a class that focuses on honing the students' ability to think and write like a lawyer.

Cumberland School of Law's John L. Carroll Moot Court Room – Cordell Hull's portrait at head of room

Second- and third-year courses allow students more choices and some degree of specialization. Cumberland offers a balance of traditional courses, such as Criminal Procedure, Family Law, and Basic Federal Income Tax, and practical courses, such as Basic and Advanced Trial Skills, Business Drafting, Real Estate Transactions, and Law Office Practice and Management.

Students must also take Professional Responsibility and the MPRE, an exam that is required to practice in addition to the bar exam.

Students are taught using the Socratic method, typical of law school pedagogy.

=== Lucille Stewart Beeson Law Library ===
The library building is 42,500 square feet (3,950 m^{2}) with 13 conference rooms, 474 study spaces, carrels equipped with electrical and data connections, and three computer labs.

The collection consists of approximately 300,000 volumes and microform volume equivalents. The library also offers electronic and audiovisual resources. There are seven full-time librarians, eight full-time support staff members, and four part-time support staff members.

=== Center for Biotechnology, Law, and Ethics ===
The Center for Biotechnology, Law and Ethics focus is on the research and study of the ethical and legal issues arising from the biotechnology industry, which is important to the City of Birmingham. Each year the Center sponsors a major symposium which attracts nationally known experts.

The 2007 Symposium, entitled "The United States Health-Care System: Access, Equity and Efficiency", focused on the issues of health care delivery in the United States, particularly to the poor, the problems that exist and potential solutions to those problems. The symposium brought together experts from the University of Minnesota, the Saint Louis University School of Law and Texas A & M University and Cumberland.

The keynote address, which was also the Thurgood Marshall Lecture, was presented by United States Congressman Artur Davis, a leader on issues relating to the delivery of health care services.

Other research centers include the Center for Law & Church, and the Alabama Center for Law and Civic Education

== Admissions statistics ==
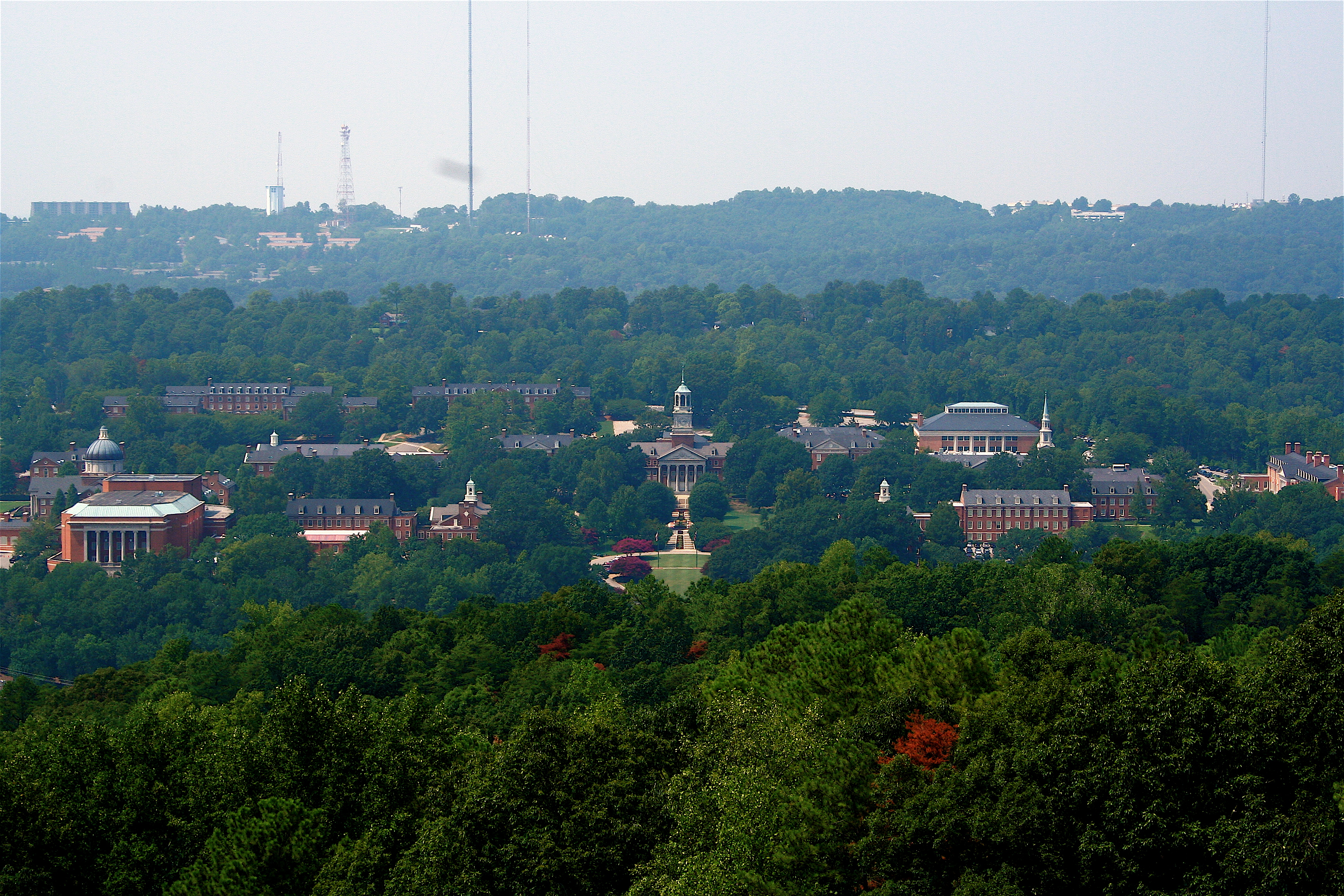
Bird's-eye view of the campus

For the Fall 2023 entering class, the school offered admission to 55.67% of applicants, with 38.14% of accepted students enrolling. The class consisted of 152 students with an average LSAT score of 155 and average GPA of 3.61. The top 75th percentile of the class has an LSAT score of 157 and 3.79 GPA, and the bottom 25th percentile has an LSAT score of 152 and 3.37 GPA. The entering group had 61 male students, 89 female, and two that did not report a sex. There were 37 students of color and 23 students identifying as African American.

== Rankings ==
U.S. News & World Report in its 2024 ranking places Cumberland tied at #103 in Best Law Schools out of 196 ABA accredited schools.

== Bar examination passage ==
In 2023, the overall bar examination passage rate for the law school’s first-time examination takers was 78.36%. The Ultimate Bar Pass Rate, which the ABA defines as the passage rate for graduates who sat for bar examinations within two years of graduating, was 93.80% for the class of 2021.

== Employment ==
According to Samford's official 2022 ABA-required disclosures, 80.7% of the Class of 2022 obtained full-time, long-term, JD-required employment nine months after graduation. The largest number of students were employed in law firms of 1 – 10 attorneys. Samford's Law School Transparency under-employment score is 19.3%, indicating the percentage of the Class of 2022 unemployed, pursuing an additional degree, or working in a non-professional, short-term, or part-time job nine months after graduation.

== Costs ==
The total cost of attendance (indicating the cost of tuition, fees, and living expenses) at Samford for the 2022-2023 academic year is $65,900. The Law School Transparency estimated debt-financed cost of attendance for three years is $238,529.

== Organizations ==
=== Publications ===
The Center for Biotechnology, Law and Ethics – 2006 Biofuels Conference

Justice Tempered by Mercy – Statue located in the Courtyard of the Law School

1. The Cumberland Law Review, whose members are selected by a write-on competition from the top 15% of the first-year class.
2. The American Journal of Trial Advocacy, whose members are selected by a write-on competition from the top 33% of the first-year class.

=== Selected student organizations ===
- Alabama Defense Lawyer's Association
- The American Constitution Society for Law and Policy
- Association of Trial Lawyers of America (ATLA)
- Black Law Students Association
- Christian Legal Society
- Cordell Hull Speakers Forum
- Federalist Society
- Henry Upson Sims Moot Court Board
- Law, Science and Technology Society
- Phi Alpha Delta
- Student Bar Association
- Trial Advocacy Board
- Women in the Law

In 2007, student teams from Cumberland won both the Criminal Justice Trial Competition held in Hamden, Connecticut and the Lone Star Classic Mock Trial Competition in San Antonio, Texas.

In 2008, Cumberland placed first out of 256 other teams in the American Association for Justice National Student Trial Advocacy Competition and in 2009 placed second, losing by one point. The same year, Cumberland made the finals of the ABA National Appellate Advocacy competition. It was one of four from 30 teams in its region that went to the national finals in Chicago. Cumberland won third best brief in the region.

In 2009, a Cumberland team won the regional round of the National Trial Competition in Tallahassee, Florida, advancing to the national championship round in San Antonio. Cumberland was the only school in the competition to have both of its teams advance to the semi-final round. Cumberland also won the American Association for Justice Mock Trial Competition regional championship advancing to the national championship round in West Palm Beach, FL.

== Student life ==
Cumberland offers numerous extracurricular activities.

Housing for law students is not available on campus. Students typically rent apartments or buy houses in the surrounding community.

== Deans ==
	Dean	Tenure
1	Nathan Green Jr.	1903
2	Andrew Martin	
3	Edward E. Beard	
4	William R. Chambers	acting dean
5	Albert Williams	acting dean 1933–1935
6	Albert B. Neil	acting dean
7	Samuel Gilreath	acting dean 1947–1948
8	Arthur A. Weeks	1947–1952
9	Donald E. Corley	acting dean 1972–1973, dean 1974–1984
10	Brad Bishop	acting dean 1984–1985
11	Parham H. Williams	1985–1996
12	Barry A. Currier	1996–2000
13	Michael D. Floyd	acting dean 2000–01
14	John L. Carroll	2001–2013
15	Henry C. Strickland III	2013–2022
16	Blake Hudson	2022–present

== Notable alumni ==
The school has more than 11,000 graduates, and its alumni include two United States Supreme Court Justices, Nobel Peace Prize recipient Cordell Hull, "the father of the United Nations", over 50 U.S. representatives, and numerous senators, governors, and judges.

- William Benjamin Craig, Class of 1898, former U.S. Congressman for the 4th District of Alabama
- Brady E. Mendheim Jr., Supreme Court of Alabama Associate Justice.
- Martha Roby, Class of 2001, former U.S. Congresswoman for the 2nd District of Alabama
- John H. Smithwick, Democratic congressman from Florida (1919-1927).
- Randall Woodfin, Mayor of Birmingham, Alabama (2017–present).
- Doug Jones, United States Senator from Alabama (2018-2021).
- T. J. Johnston, environmental lawyer and Anglican bishop.
- Jimmy Rane, founder and chief executive officer (CEO) of Great Southern Wood Preserving

== Government ==
=== United States government ===
==== Executive branch ====
===== Cabinet members and cabinet-level officers =====
- Cordell Hull (D) – United States Secretary of State under Franklin D. Roosevelt, Nobel Peace Prize recipient, 11 terms as U.S. Representative, chairman of the Democratic National Committee, co-initiated the United Nations

==== Judicial branch ====
===== Supreme Court =====
- Howell Edmunds Jackson
- Horace Harmon Lurton – United States Supreme Court Justice, Tennessee Supreme Court, justice U.S. Court of Appeals for the Sixth Circuit, dean of Vanderbilt University law department

===== Courts of appeals =====
- Benjamin Franklin Cameron -- judge on the United States Court of Appeals for the Fifth Circuit
- Joel Fredrick Dubina – Chief Judge of the United States Court of Appeals for the Eleventh Circuit, former federal Magistrate Judge and District Judge.

===== District courts =====
- James V. Allred - United States District Judge (United States District Court for the Southern District of Texas)
- Charles E. Atchley, Jr. - United States District Judge (United States District Court for the Eastern District of Tennessee)
- Karon O. Bowdre – United States District Judge (United States District Court for the Northern District of Alabama)
- Harry E. Claiborne – United States District Judge (United States District Court for the District of Nevada), impeached
- Max O. Cogburn Jr. – United States District Judge (United States District Court for the Western District of North Carolina)
- James I. Cohn – United States District Judge (United States District Court for the Southern District of Florida)

===== Other federal courts =====
- John L. Carroll – former United States Magistrate judge and dean of Cumberland School of Law, Legal Director of the Southern Poverty Law Center

==== Legislative branch ====
===== U.S. senators =====
- Henry Cooper (U.S. Senator) (D) – United States Senator from Tennessee.
- Thomas P. Gore - U.S. Senator (D) from Oklahoma
- Carl Hatch (D) – U.S. Senator from New Mexico, author of the Hatch Act of 1939
- Doug Jones (D) - U.S. Senator from Alabama
- William F. Kirby (D) – U.S. Senator from Arkansas, associate justice of the Arkansas Supreme Court, Attorney General for Arkansas, author of Kirby’s Digest of the Statutes of Arkansas
- Joshua B. Lee (D) – U.S. Senator and Representative from Oklahoma
- Bert H. Miller (D) – U.S. Senator from Idaho and Idaho Attorney General
- Tom Stewart (D) – U.S. Senator from Tennessee, chief prosecutor during the Scopes Trial

===== U.S. representatives =====
1. Thomas G. Abernethy (D)- U.S. Representative from Mississippi (1943–1973)
2. Robert Aderholt (R)- U.S. Representative from Alabama (1997– )
3. Clifford Allen (D) – U.S. Representative from Tennessee
4. Richard Merrill Atkinson (D) – U.S. Representative from Tennessee
5. Maecenas Eason Benton (D) – U.S. Representative from Missouri. Father of famed artist Thomas Hart Benton
6. Joseph Edgar Brown (R) – U.S. Representative from Tennessee
7. Foster V. Brown (R) – U.S. Representative from Tennessee, father of Joseph Edgar Brown
8. Omar Burleson (D) – U.S. Representative from Texas
9. Robert R. Butler (R) – U.S. Representative from Oregon
10. Adam M. Byrd (D) – U.S. Representative from Mississippi
11. William Parker Caldwell (D) – U.S. Representative from Tennessee, Tennessee State Senator
12. Samuel Caruthers (W) – U.S. Representative from Missouri
13. Frank Chelf (D) – U.S. Representative from Kentucky
14. Judson C. Clements (D) – U.S. Representative from Georgia
15. Wynne F. Clouse (R) – U.S. Representative from Tennessee
16. William B. Craig (D) – U.S. Representative from Alabama
17. Jere Cooper (D) – U.S. Representative from Tennessee
18. John Duncan Sr. (R) – 12 term U.S. Representative from Tennessee
19. Harold Earthman (D) – U.S. Representative from Tennessee
20. Benjamin A. Enloe (D) – U.S. Representative from Tennessee
21. Joe L. Evins (D) – U.S. Representative from Tennessee
22. Lewis P. Featherstone (D) – U.S. Representative from Arkansas
23. Aaron L. Ford (D) – U.S. Representative from Mississippi
24. William Voris Gregory (D) – U.S. Representative from Kentucky
25. Edward Isaac Golladay (D) – U.S. Representative from Tennessee
26. Isaac Goodnight (D) – U.S. Representative from Kentucky
27. Oren Harris (D) – U.S. Representative from Arkansas
28. Robert H. Hatton (O) – U.S. Congressman, Confederate brigadier general, Opposition party member, killed during the Battle of Fair Oaks
29. Goldsmith W. Hewitt (D) – U.S. Representative from Alabama
30. Wilson S. Hill (D) – U.S. Representative from Missouri
31. George Huddleston (D) – U.S. Representative from Alabama and father of George Huddleston Jr.
32. Howell Edmunds Jackson (D) – also a United States Supreme Court Justice, brother of General William Hicks Jackson
33. Evan Jenkins (R) – U.S. Representative from West Virginia
34. Abraham Kazen (D) – U.S. Representative from Texas
35. Wade H. Kitchens (D) – U.S. Representative from Arkansas
36. John C. Kyle (D) – U.S. Representative from Mississippi
37. John Ridley Mitchell – U.S. Representative from Tennessee
38. Tom J. Murray (D) – U.S. Representative from Tennessee
39. Wright Patman (D) – U.S. Representative from Texas
40. Herron C. Pearson (D) – U.S. Representative from Tennessee
41. Andrew Price (D) – U.S. Representative from Louisiana
42. Haywood Yancey Riddle (D) – U.S. Representative from Tennessee
43. Martha Roby (R) – U.S. Representative from Alabama
44. Dennis A. Ross (R) – U.S. Representative from Florida
45. Thetus W. Sims (D) – U.S. Representative from Tennessee
46. James Edward Ruffin (D) – U.S. Representative from Missouri
47. Thomas U. Sisson (D) – U.S. Representative from Mississippi
48. John H. Smithwick (D) – U.S. Representative from Florida
49. Charles Swindall (R) – U.S. Representative from Oklahoma
50. John May Taylor (D) – U.S. Representative from Tennessee
51. Anthony F. Tauriello (D) – U.S. Representative for New York
52. J. Will Taylor (R) – U.S. Representative from Tennessee
53. Zachary Taylor (D) – U.S. Representative from Tennessee
54. Richard Warner (D) – U.S. Representative from Tennessee

==== Military ====
- George Doherty Johnson – Confederate brigadier general, United States Civil Service Commissioner, superintendent of The Citadel (military college)

==== Miscellaneous United States government ====
- Mauricio J. Tamargo – 14th Chairman of the Foreign Claims Settlement Commission

==== State government ====
===== Governors =====
- James V. Allred (D) – 2 term Governor of Texas
- Albert Brewer – Governor of Alabama, Distinguished Professor of Law and Government
- Gordon Browning (D) – Governor of Tennessee, U.S. Representative from Tennessee
- Robert L. Caruthers – Governor of Tennessee, Tennessee Attorney General
- Sidney J. Catts (P) – Governor of Florida (22nd), Prohibition party candidate
- LeRoy Collins (D) – Governor of Florida
- Charlie Crist (R) – Governor of Florida, Former Florida Attorney General
- Edward H. East (W) – Secretary of State for Tennessee and Acting Governor of Tennessee in 1865
- William J. Holloway (D) – Governor of Oklahoma

===== State attorneys general =====
- Charles Graddick (R)- Former Attorney General of Alabama, candidate for Governor during the famous 1986 race
- Crawford Martin (D) – Texas State Senator, Texas Secretary of State, Attorney General of Texas, and mayor of Hillsboro, Texas
- Joseph Turner Patterson (D) - Former Attorney General of Mississippi

===== State judges, politicians and others =====
- Oscar W. Adams Jr. – the first African-American Alabama Supreme Court justice and the first African American elected to statewide office in Alabama (including the Reconstruction era), taught classes in appellate and trial advocacy.
- John Amari – Circuit judge in Birmingham; former member of both houses of the Alabama State Legislature
- Roger Bedford Jr. (D) – seven term Alabama State Senator
- John Cosgrove (D) – Florida legislator and first mayor of Cutler Bay, Florida
- Ryan DeGraffenried (D) – Alabama State Senator, President Pro Tempore of state Senate, Acting Lieutenant Governor of Alabama
- Read Fletcher (D) – Arkansas House of Representatives
- Grafton Green – associate justice of the Tennessee Supreme Court, presided over the appeal of John T. Scopes
- Ralph Haben (D) – Former Speaker of the Florida House of Representatives
- Van Hilleary (R) – Tennessee politician and lobbyist
- James Edwin Horton – Judge who presided over the retrial of the Scottsboro Boys who set aside the jury's conviction and sentence of death and was then removed by the Alabama Supreme Court. He is remembered by a plaque on the courthouse.
- Jeff Hoover (R) – Kentucky House of Representatives
- Carolyn Hugley (D) – Minority Whip, Georgia House of Representatives
- Douglas S. Jackson (D) – State Senator from Tennessee, executive director of the Renaissance Center
- Napoleon B. Johnson (D) – Justice, Oklahoma State Supreme Court
- Zeb Little (D) – Majority Leader and Floor Leader of the Alabama Senate
- Helen Shores Lee – Judge for 10th Judicial Circuit of Alabama
- John Marks Moore (D) - Secretary of State of Texas from 1887 to 1891
- Horace Elmo Nichols – Chief Justice of the Supreme Court of Georgia from 1975–1980
- Charles H. O'Brien (D) – Tennessee State Senator, Tennessee State Supreme Court
- William Y. Pemberton – Chief Justice of the Montana Supreme Court
- DuBose Porter (D) – Minority Leader, Georgia House of Representatives
- Paine Page Prim – chief justice of the Oregon Supreme Court, first graduate of Cumberland Law School
- Janie Shores – Alabama Supreme Court Justice

==== City and county government ====
- Beverly Briley (D) – mayor of Nashville, Tennessee
- Ben West – mayor of Nashville, Tennessee
- Andy Steingold - Mayor of Safety Harbor, Florida

=== Non-U.S. government ===
- Ashby Pate – Associate Justice of the Supreme Court of Palau

== Arts and letters ==
- Joe Hilley – New York Times Best Selling author, born in Birmingham, Alabama. Hilley wrote Sarah Palin: A New Kind of Leader (Zondervan/HarperCollins), which reached The New York Times Best Seller list during the final two weeks of the 2008 Presidential Election campaign.
- Mike Papantonio – head of mass tort department at Levin, Papantonio in Pensacola, Florida, one of America's 15 most successful plaintiff's firms; host of the radio show Ring of Fire (radio program); a Methodist and featured on the documentary Jesus Camp.
- Mike Stewart – American writer
- John Strohm (JD 2004) – entertainment lawyer and former member of the Blake Babies and The Lemonheads
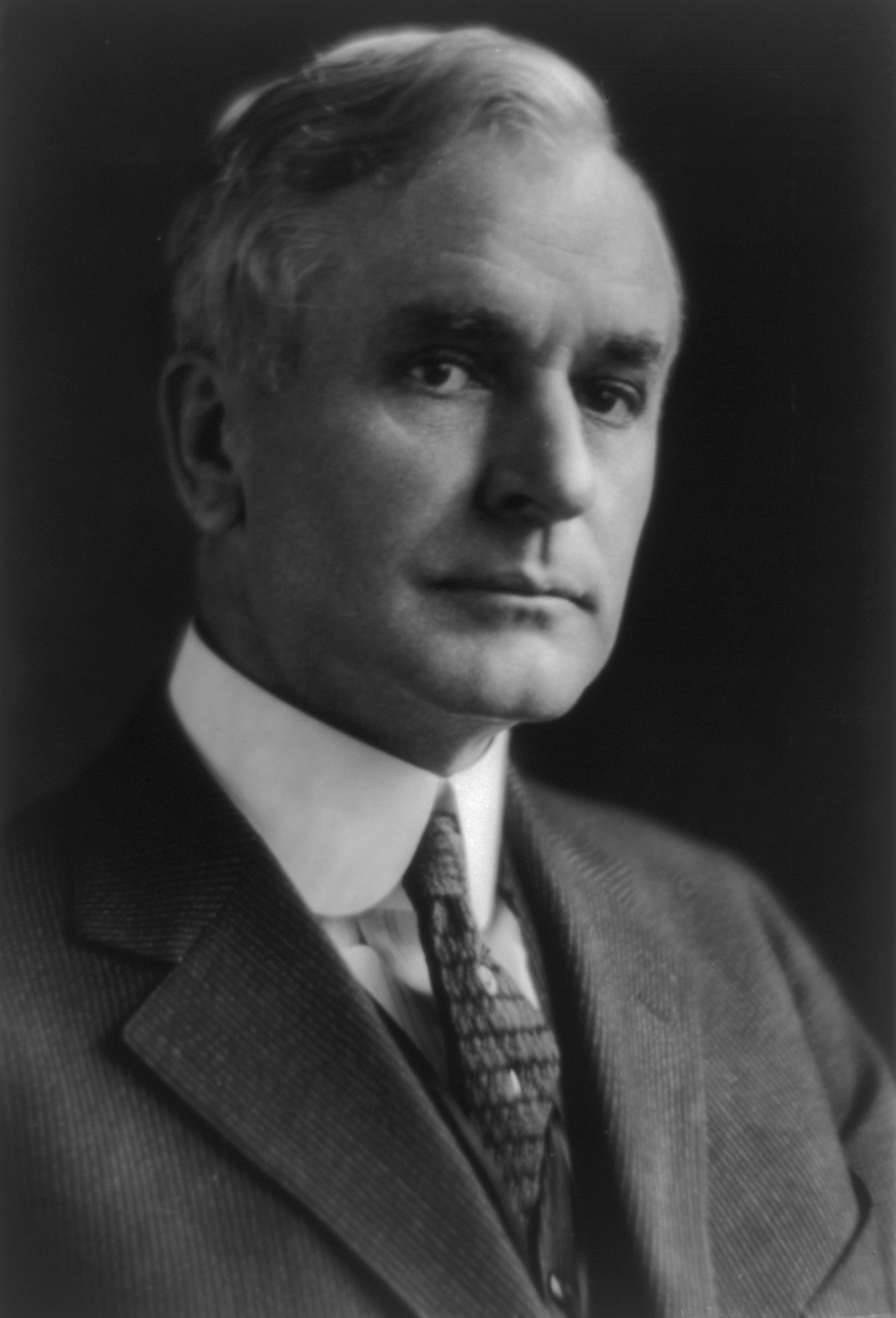
Cordell Hull – Nobel Peace Prize, U.S. Secretary of State, Father of the U.N.

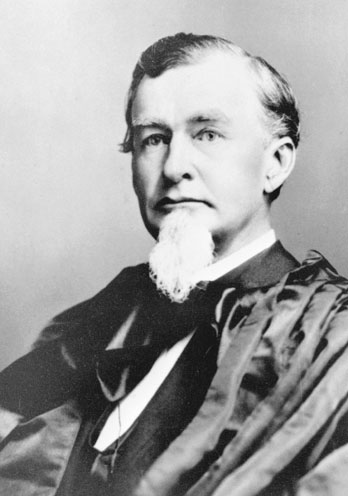
Howell Jackson – Supreme Court Justice, Justice for U.S. Sixth Circuit, U.S. Senator, U.S. Representative

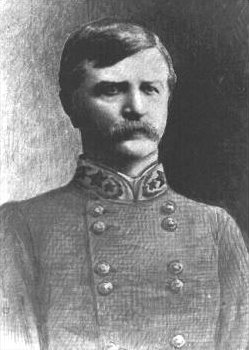
George Doherty Johnson – Civil War general and superintendent of The Citadel (military college)

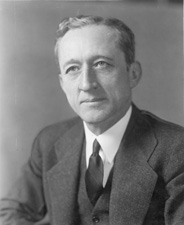
Carl Hatch (D) – U.S. Senator from New Mexico, author of the Hatch Acts of 1939 and 1940

Judge John L. Carroll, former dean of Cumberland, addressing Cumberland's 2006 graduation ceremony

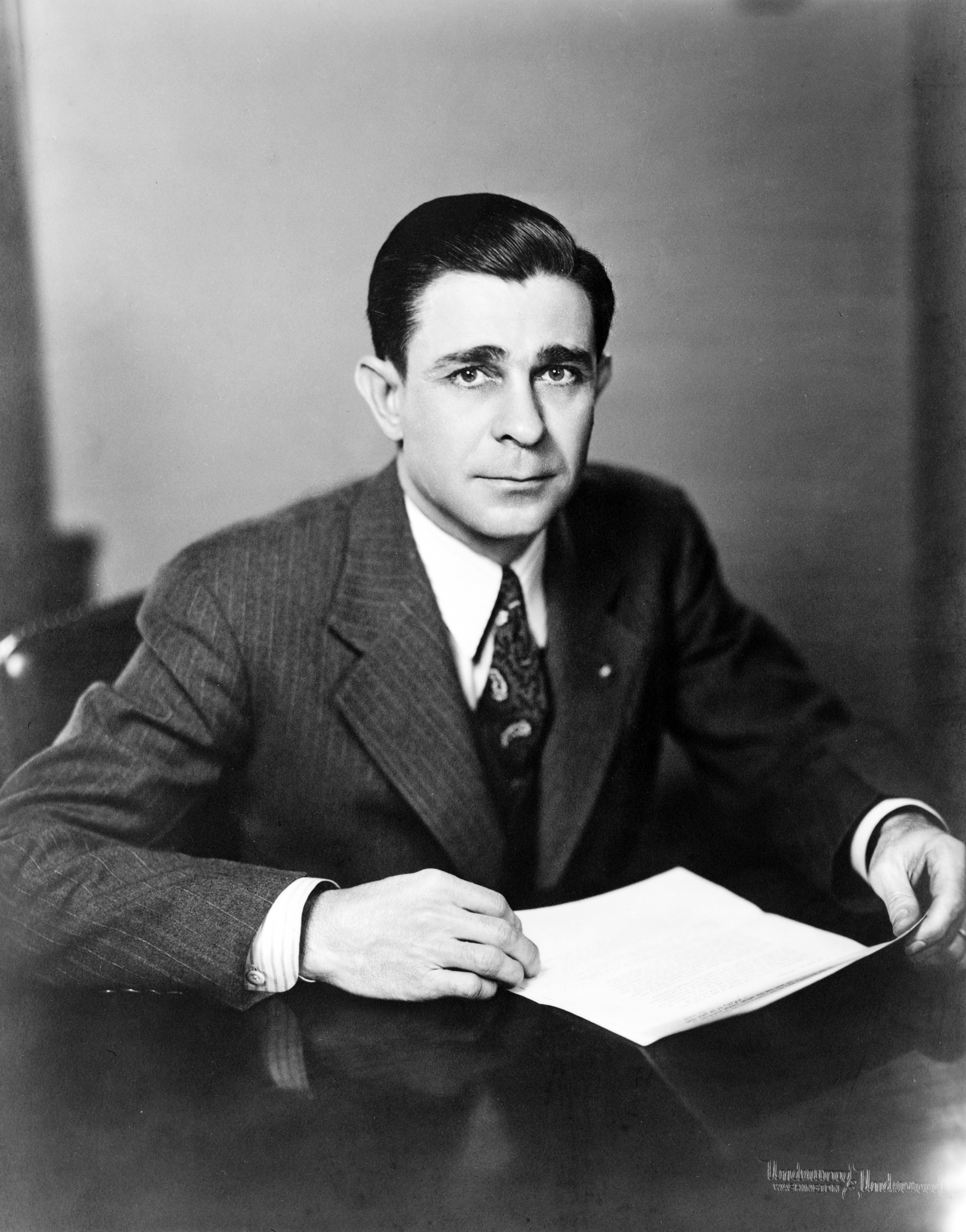
Thomas G. Abernethy (D)- U.S. Representative from Mississippi

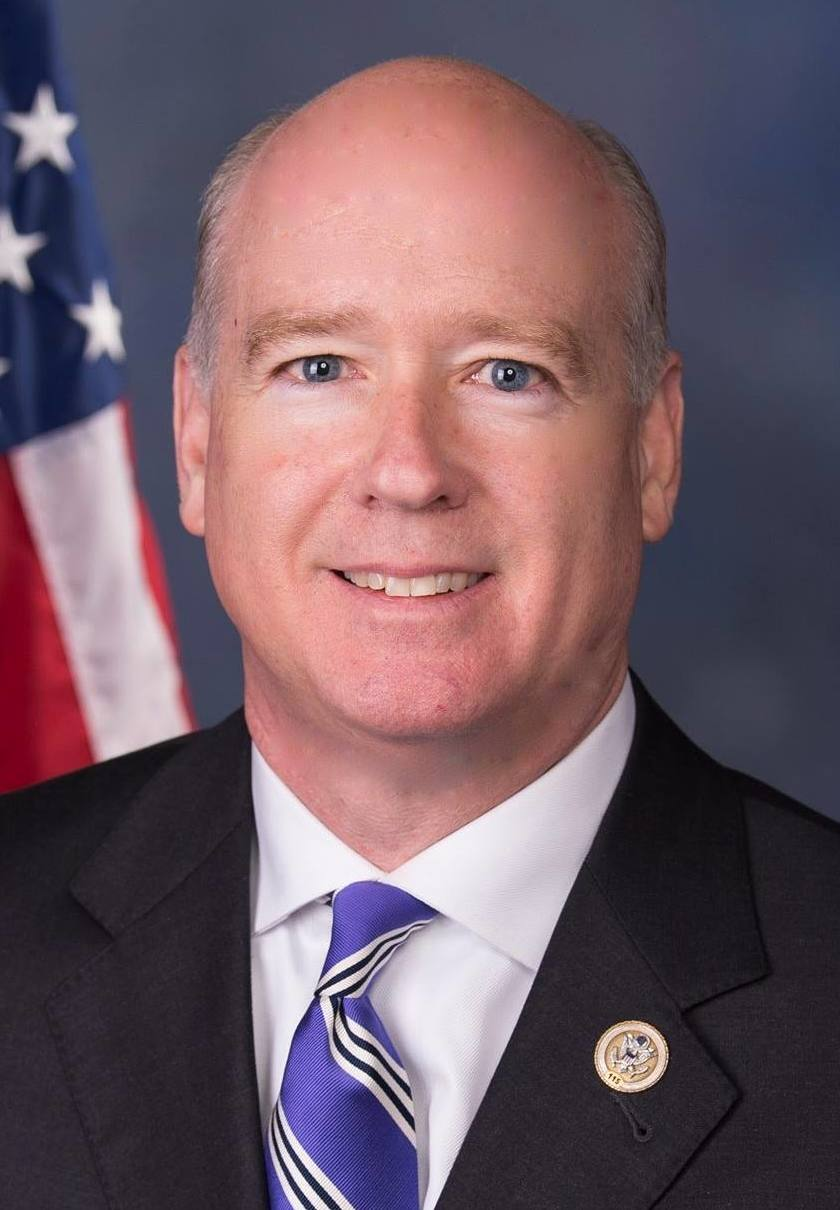
Robert Aderholt (R)- U.S. Representative from Alabama (1997– )

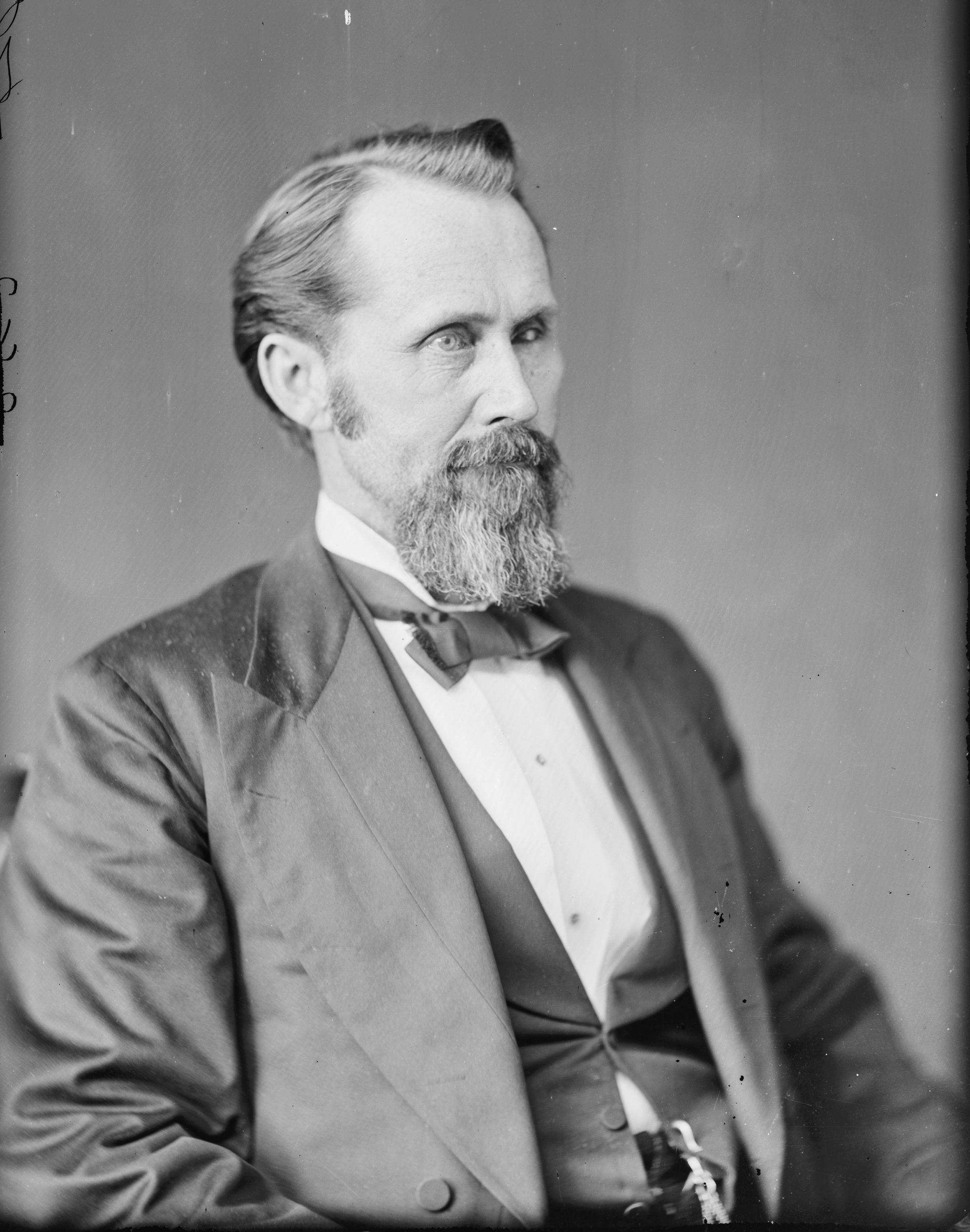
William Parker Caldwell – American politician and a member of the United States House of Representatives for the 9th congressional district of Tennessee

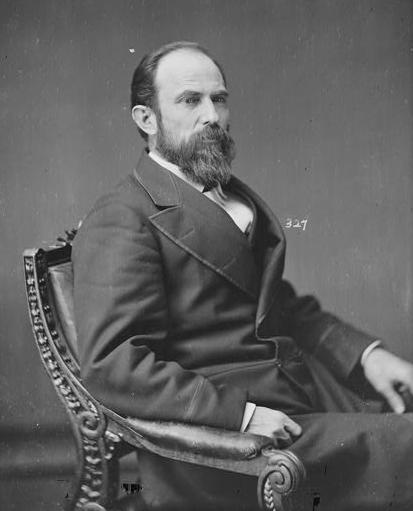
Goldsmith W. Hewitt (D) – U.S. Representative from Alabama

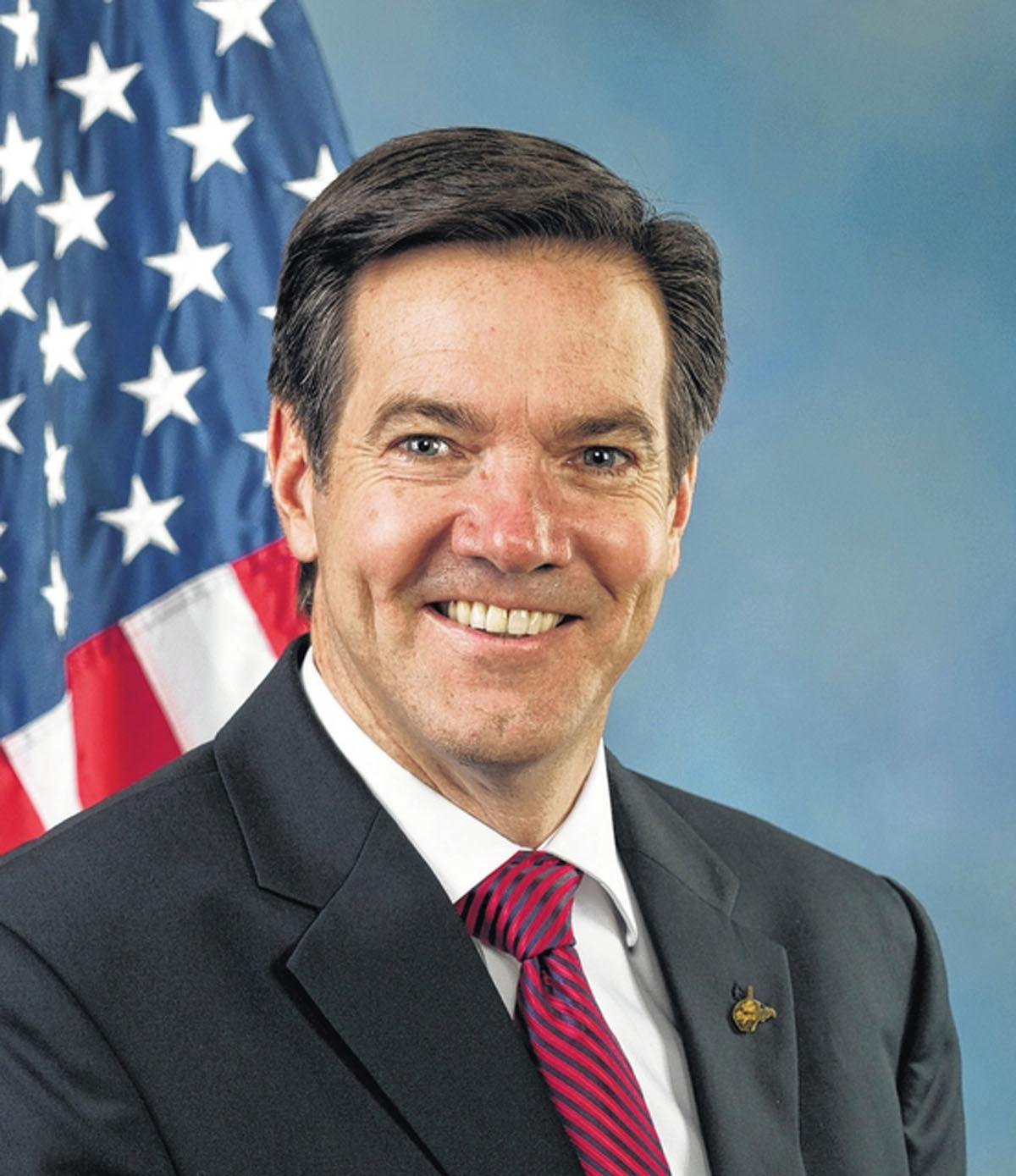
Evan Jenkins (R) - U.S. Representative from West Virginia
