= Cumberland Law Review =

- Discipline: Law
- Language: English
- Edited by: Haleigh H. Chambliss

Publication details
- History: 1970–present
- Publisher: Cumberland School of Law, Samford University (United States)
- Frequency: Biannual

Standard abbreviations
- Bluebook: Cumb. L. Rev.
- ISO 4: Cumberl. Law Rev.

Indexing
- ISSN: 0360-8298
- OCLC no.: 2244588

Links
- Journal homepage

The Cumberland Law Review is a law review published by the students at Cumberland School of Law in Birmingham, Alabama.

Founded in 1970, the Review publishes two issues a year, with each issue averaging between 150 and 200 pages. Each issue consists of any combination of tributes, articles, essays, notes, and comments. Generally, an issue includes at least one article, note, and comment. Occasionally, part of an issue or an entire issue is devoted to a single topic. For instance, in 2016 the Review published a symposium on Harper Lee's books "Go Set a Watchman" and "To Kill a Mockingbird."The Review's online companion, the Cumberland Law Review Online, publishes shorter pieces surveying recent developments with the Supreme Court of Alabama and United States Court of Appeals for the Eleventh Circuit.

== Membership ==
Membership on the Cumberland Law Review is available to those students in the top fifteen percent of the 1L class, determined at the close of the second semester, who successfully complete a write-on competition, known as the Candidates Program, consisting of a Bluebook examination and casenote submission. A student must successfully complete both phases to become a member of the Review. Members of the Review's editorial staff perform cite checks, attend mandatory meetings, write surveys tracking legal developments, and submit a comment for publication consideration.

== Submissions ==
The Cumberland Law Review considers articles, essays, notes, and comments from professionals and professors with a law degree for both its print and online publications. Individuals who wish to submit a piece for publication should consult the Review's website for specific submission instructions.

== Seminars ==
The Cumberland Law Review hosts a yearly academic seminar, either in the form of a Symposium or a Colloquium. In the past, the Review has hosted symposia on Alabama Dram Shop Liability, the legal practice in the wake of COVID-19, Harper Lee's works, and alternative dispute resolution.
