= Brett Talley =

American lawyer (born 1981)

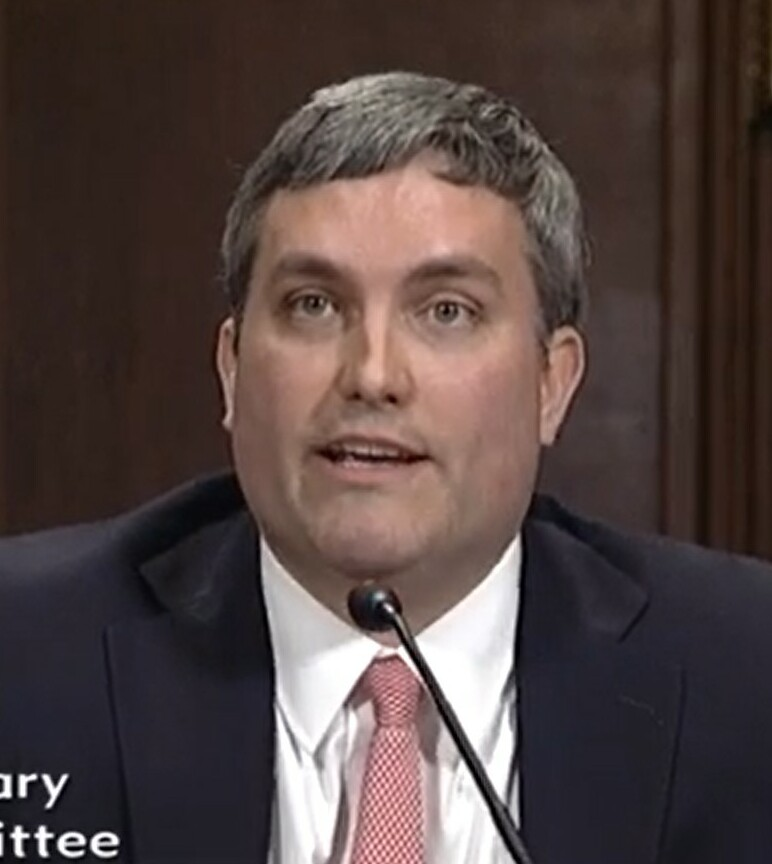
- Talley in 2017
- Born: Brett Joseph Talley; 1981 (age 44–45); Birmingham, Alabama, U.S.
- Education: University of Alabama (BA); Harvard University (JD)
- Political party: Republican
- Spouse: Ann Michelle Donaldson (m. 2015)

Brett Joseph Talley (born 1981) is an American lawyer and author who served as a Deputy Assistant Attorney General in the Department of Justice. In September 2017, he was nominated by President Donald Trump to fill a vacancy on the United States District Court for the Middle District of Alabama. His nomination drew controversy due to his lack of judicial experience, partisan personal blogging, and failure to disclose that he was married to Ann Donaldson, the chief of staff to White House counsel Don McGahn. He became the third judicial nominee since 1989 to receive a unanimous rating of "not qualified" from the American Bar Association. On December 13, 2017, Talley withdrew his name from consideration for the appointment.

== Early life and education ==
Talley earned his Bachelor of Arts in philosophy and history from the University of Alabama, and his Juris Doctor, magna cum laude, from Harvard Law School, where he served as an articles editor of the Harvard Journal of Law and Public Policy.

== Career ==
Earlier in his career, he worked as an associate in the Washington, D.C., office of Gibson, Dunn & Crutcher, served as law clerk to Judge Joel F. Dubina of the United States Court of Appeals for the Eleventh Circuit, and served as a law clerk to Judge L. Scott Coogler of the United States District Court for the Northern District of Alabama. Before joining the Department of Justice, he served for two years as Deputy Solicitor General under then-Alabama Attorney General Luther Strange, who endorsed his judicial nomination. Prior to joining the Alabama Attorney General's Office, Talley served as a speechwriter for U.S. Senator Rob Portman and as a senior writer for Mitt Romney's presidential campaign.

He is also the co-host of The Prosecutors true crime podcast, a highly popular, top-100 podcast.

== Failed nomination to district court ==
On September 7, 2017, President Donald J. Trump nominated Talley to serve as a United States District Judge of the United States District Court for the Middle District of Alabama, to the seat vacated by Judge Mark Fuller, who resigned on August 1, 2015. On October 17, 2017, a hearing on his nomination was held before the Senate Judiciary Committee. The ABA Standing Committee sent a letter to the Judiciary Committee dated November 7, 2017, stating that it believed Talley "did not have the requisite trial experience or its equivalent", but that it "had no questions about his integrity or temperament" and that with time and experience "Mr. Talley has great potential to serve as a federal judge." The Leadership Conference on Civil and Human Rights sent a letter dated November 8, 2017 to the Judiciary Committee stating that Talley "has demonstrated ideologically extreme views that call into question his temperament and ability to approach cases with the fairness and open-mindedness necessary to serve as a federal judge," quoting tweets and blog posts and asking that Chairman Chuck Grassley "not break the Senate tradition of waiting to schedule nomination hearings until their ABA ratings have been submitted, for good reason – so that the committee can have all the relevant information before it when questioning nominees for lifetime appointments to the judiciary."

On November 9, 2017, the Senate Judiciary Committee endorsed Talley for the lifetime appointment in an 11–9 party-line vote; Chairman Grassley, rejecting the ABA's "not qualified" opinion on Talley and fellow nominee Holly Teeter, wrote, "I’ll be voting for both these nominees today.... I don’t see extensive trial experience as the sole factor in deciding whether a nominee is qualified." On December 12, Grassley said that he had advised the Trump White House to "reconsider" the nominations of Talley and Jeff Mateer: "I would advise the White House not to proceed." A spokesperson for Grassley said that the Senator "has been concerned about statements made by nominees Mateer and Talley, and he’s conveyed those concerns to the White House. Talley was found to have made comments on an online message board, in which he showed support for Nathan Bedford Forrest and “The early KKK”. In these posts, Talley falsely claimed that during reconstruction, the KKK did not engage in violence or racism. Revelations of Talley’s statements surfaced only after he was reported out of the Judiciary Committee." BuzzFeed News reported that Talley had offered to withdraw the previous week and that Alabama Senator Richard Shelby had asked Talley for his letter of withdrawal. On December 13 the White House confirmed that Talley and Mateer's nominations would not proceed.

The nomination of Talley for a federal district court judgeship was noteworthy because Talley had never tried a case at the time of his nomination. Talley was unanimously rated "not qualified" by the American Bar Association's (ABA) Standing Committee on the Federal Judiciary. At the time the rating was issued, the ABA had only on two other occasions since 1989 unanimously rated a judicial nominee as "not qualified". Talley's nomination was also unusual because of his lack of experience (at the time of the nomination, he had practiced law for three years) and because he "displayed a degree of partisanship unusual for a judicial nominee" on his blog, in 2016 denouncing Hillary Clinton as "Hillary Rotten Clinton" and in 2013, after the Obama administration announced plans and proposals to address gun violence following the December 2012 Sandy Hook shooting, expressing support for the National Rifle Association. In February 2013 on his blog, Talley said that he "agree[d] completely with" a reader's "thoughtful response" which stated, "We will have to resort to arms when our other rights — of speech, press, assembly, representative government — fail to yield the desired results."

While awaiting Senate confirmation, Talley failed to disclose that he was married to Ann Donaldson, the chief of staff to White House counsel Don McGahn. As part of his Senate confirmation, Talley was asked to identify family members and others who are "likely to present potential conflicts of interest," but he did not identify his wife. Talley also did not mention his wife when describing his contact with lawyers for the White House. She was a witness in special counsel Robert Mueller's investigation into Russian interference in the 2016 presidential election. Vanzetta Penn McPherson, a former magistrate judge for the Middle District, wrote an opinion editorial calling Talley unqualified for the position.

On December 13, 2017, a White House official said that Talley had withdrawn his name from consideration. On January 3, 2018, his nomination was returned to the President under Rule XXXI, Paragraph 6 of the United States Senate. On January 5, 2018, the White House renominated 21 of 26 federal judicial nominees who had been returned by the U.S. Senate. Talley was not among the 21 individuals who were renominated.

== Writings ==
Talley has published three horror novels/novellas and two "true ghost stories"; in 2011, Talley's Lovecraftian horror novel That Which Should Not Be was a finalist for the Bram Stoker Award. Talley was part of The Tuscaloosa Paranormal Research Group, which investigated claims of paranormal phenomena such as ghosts. With TPRG co-founder David Higdon, he wrote the book Haunted Tuscaloosa about the group's investigations.

=== Bibliography ===
Series Limbus, Inc.

- Limbus, Inc. (2013) (with Benjamin Kane Ethridge, Jonathan Maberry, Joseph Nassise and Anne C Petty)
- Limbus, Inc. - Book II (2014)
- Limbus, Inc. - Book III (2016)

Novels

- That Which Should Not Be (2011)
- The Void (2012)
- He Who Walks in Shadow (2015)

Collections

- The Fiddle Is the Devil's Instrument (2017)

Non fiction

- Haunted Tuscaloosa (2012)

== Personal life ==
On August 15, 2015, Talley married Ann Michelle Donaldson, also a Harvard Law School graduate, in Tuscaloosa, Alabama.

== See also ==
- Donald Trump judicial appointment controversies
