= Emily C. Marks =

American judge (born 1973)

Emily Marks
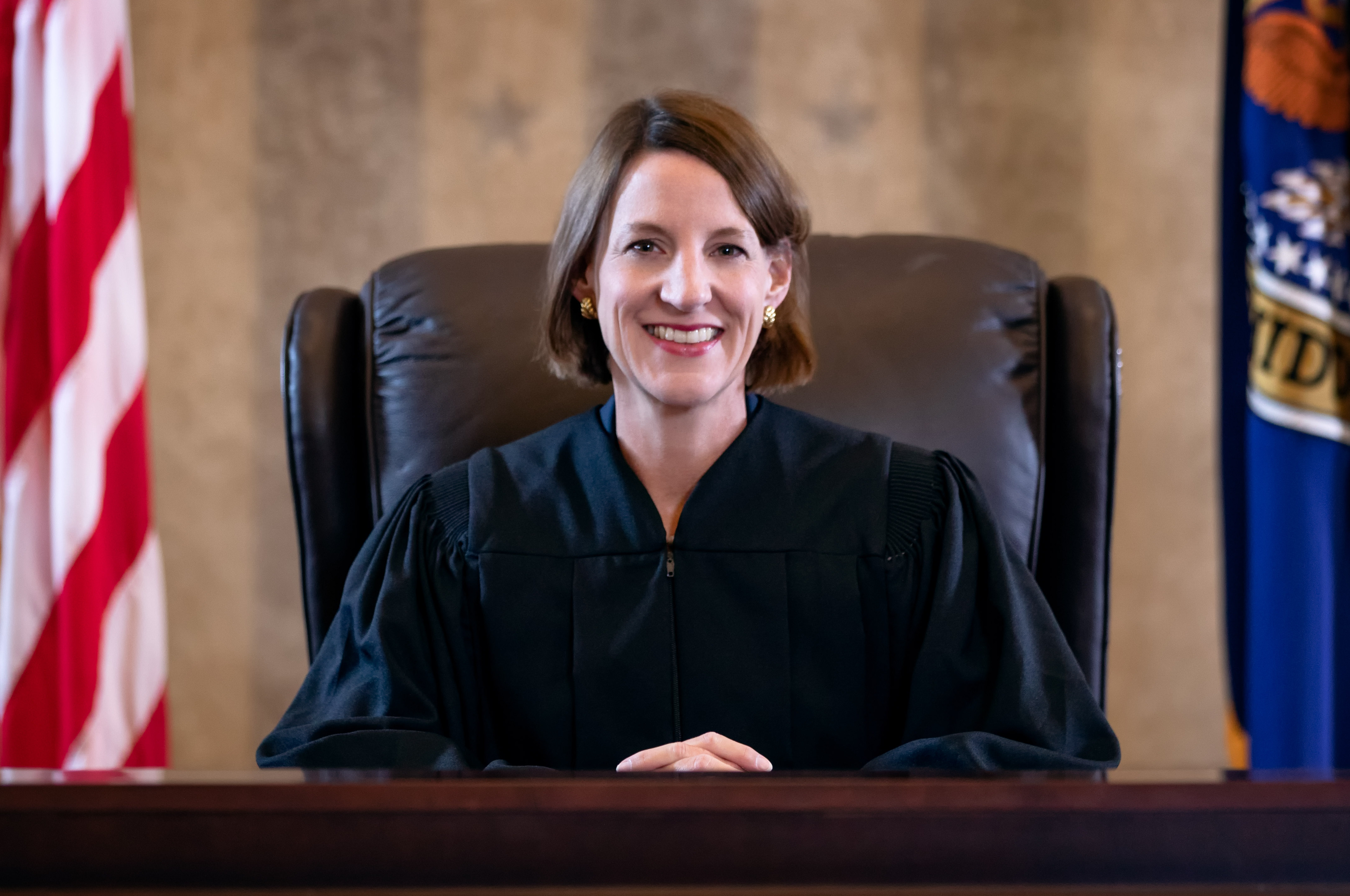

Chief Judge of the United States District Court for the Middle District of Alabama
- In office January 31, 2019 – January 31, 2026
- Preceded by: William Keith Watkins
- Succeeded by: R. Austin Huffaker Jr.

Judge of the United States District Court for the Middle District of Alabama
- Incumbent
- Assumed office August 3, 2018
- Appointed by: Donald Trump
- Preceded by: Myron H. Thompson

Personal details
- Born: Emily Michele Coody; 1973 (age 52–53) Tuscaloosa, Alabama, U.S.
- Education: Spring Hill College (BA); University of Alabama (JD)

Emily Michele Coody Marks (née Coody; born 1973) is a United States district judge of the United States District Court for the Middle District of Alabama.

== Biography ==
Marks was born in 1973, in Tuscaloosa, Alabama. She earned her Bachelor of Arts, magna cum laude, from Spring Hill College, and her Juris Doctor from the University of Alabama School of Law, where she served as chair of the John A. Campbell Moot Court Board and as a senior editor of the University of Alabama Law & Psychology Review.

Marks was a partner in the Montgomery, Alabama, office of Ball, Ball, Matthews & Novak, P.A., where she practiced from 1998, when she joined the firm as an associate, to 2018, when she became a judge. She specialized in employment law, civil rights law, and appellate law, and routinely lectured on these topics before employers and other members of the bar. She also frequently defended municipalities and towns from civil rights and other claims brought by plaintiffs.

== Federal judicial service ==
On September 7, 2017, President Donald Trump nominated Marks to serve as a United States District Judge of the United States District Court for the Middle District of Alabama, to the seat vacated by Judge Myron Herbert Thompson, who assumed senior status on August 22, 2013. On October 17, 2017, a hearing on her nomination was held before the Senate Judiciary Committee. On November 9, 2017, her nomination was reported out of committee by voice vote.

On January 3, 2018, her nomination was returned to the President under Rule XXXI, Paragraph 6 of the United States Senate. On January 5, 2018, President Donald Trump announced his intent to renominate Marks to a federal judgeship. On January 8, 2018, her renomination was sent to the Senate. On January 18, 2018, her nomination was reported out of committee by a 17–4 vote. On August 1, 2018, her nomination was confirmed by voice vote. She received her judicial commission on August 3, 2018. She became Chief Judge on January 31, 2019, after William Keith Watkins assumed senior status.

In September 2021, The Wall Street Journal published an investigation into 131 federal judges who were alleged to have broken the law by presiding over cases in which they had a financial interest. In August 2018, Marks purchased stock in Wells Fargo Bank two weeks after she was assigned a case in which plaintiff-homeowners sued Wells Fargo for wrongful foreclosure on their home. She did not disclose her stock purchases. Marks subsequently dismissed the lawsuit against Wells Fargo on a pre-trial motion.

In October 2022, Marks invoked qualified immunity to deny the family of a cancer patient the right to sue the policeman who killed him. The patient had acted aggressive and erratic after brain surgery. The family called the police for help. A neighbor, also a policeman, intervened and fired six shots after being attacked, hitting the unarmed victim five times.

== Memberships ==
She has been a member of the Federalist Society since 2017.

Legal offices
Preceded by Myron Herbert Thompson	Judge of the United States District Court for the Middle District of Alabama; 2018–present	Incumbent
Preceded by William Keith Watkins	Chief Judge of the United States District Court for the Middle District of Alabama; 2019–2026	Succeeded by R. Austin Huffaker Jr.
