= Harold Albritton =

American judge (born 1936)

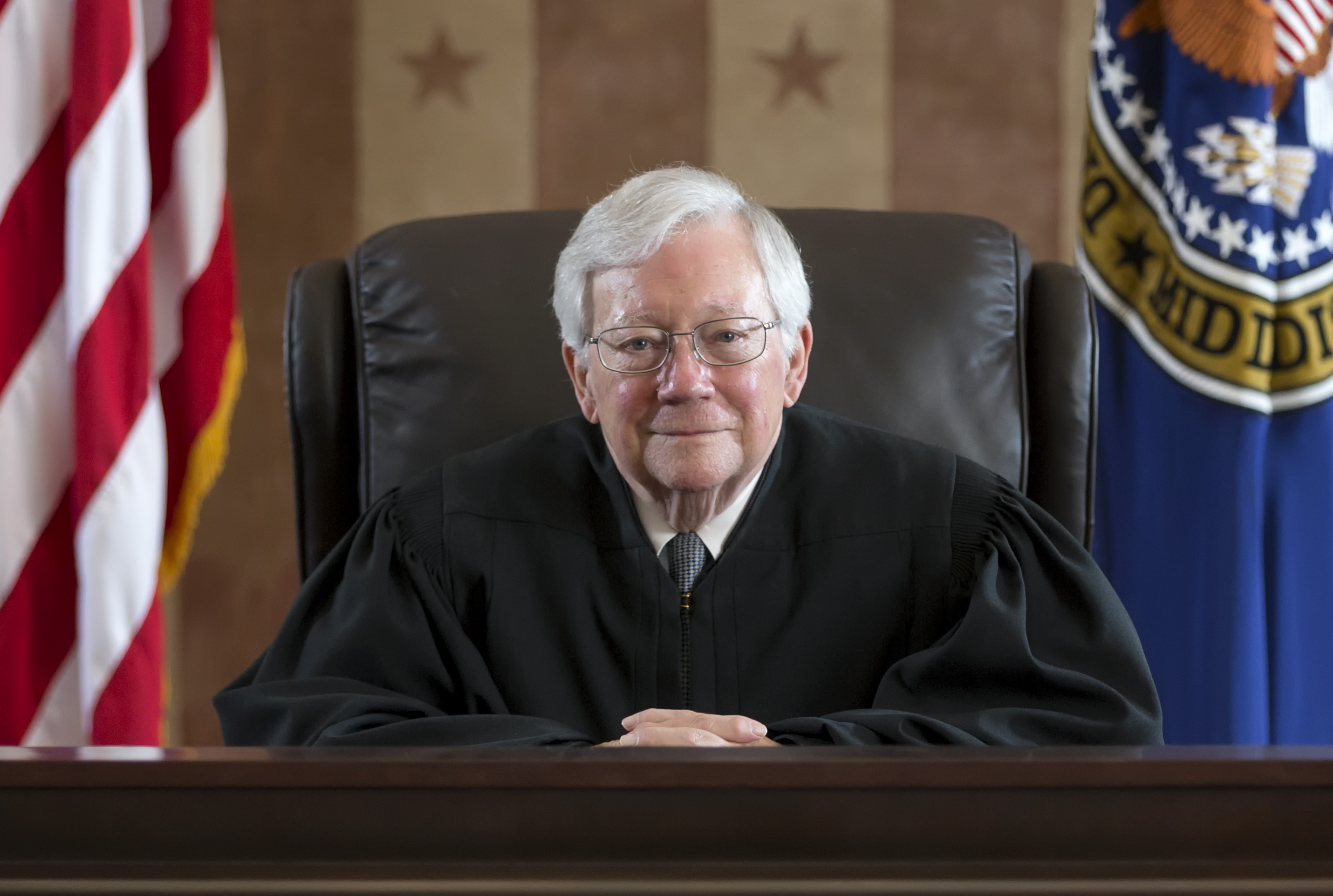

Senior Judge of the United States District Court for the Middle District of Alabama
- Incumbent
- Assumed office May 17, 2004

Chief Judge of the United States District Court for the Middle District of Alabama
- In office 1998–2004
- Preceded by: Myron Herbert Thompson
- Succeeded by: Mark Fuller

Judge of the United States District Court for the Middle District of Alabama
- In office May 14, 1991 – May 17, 2004
- Appointed by: George H. W. Bush
- Preceded by: Joel Fredrick Dubina
- Succeeded by: William Keith Watkins

Personal details
- Born: William Harold Albritton III; December 19, 1936 (age 89) Andalusia, Alabama, U.S.
- Education: University of Alabama at Tuscaloosa (BA, LLB)

William Harold Albritton III (born December 19, 1936) is a senior United States district judge of the United States District Court for the Middle District of Alabama.

== Education and career ==
Born in Andalusia, Alabama, Albritton graduated from Andalusia High School, and received a Bachelor of Arts from the University of Alabama in 1959, and a Bachelor of Laws from the University of Alabama School of Law in 1960. He was a captain in the United States Army, JAG Corps, from 1960 to 1962, and continued as a reserve officer until 1968. He joined the Andalusia law firm which had been founded by his great-grandfather in 1887, and remained in private practice in Andalusia from 1962 to 1991. He was the President of the Alabama State Bar from 1990 to 1991.

== District Court service ==
Albritton was nominated by President George H. W. Bush on March 11, 1991, to the United States District Court in Montgomery, to a seat vacated by Joel Fredrick Dubina. He was confirmed by the United States Senate on May 9, 1991, and received his judicial commission on May 14, 1991. Albritton served as Chief Judge of the Middle District of Alabama from 1998 to 2004 and oversaw the construction of the new Federal Courthouse complex in Montgomery. He assumed senior status on May 17, 2004.

== Personal life ==
He is married to the former Jane Howard and has three sons that are all practicing attorneys.

== Sources ==
Legal offices
Preceded by Joel Fredrick Dubina	Judge of the United States District Court for the Middle District of Alabama; 1991–2004	Succeeded by William Keith Watkins
Preceded by Myron Herbert Thompson	Chief Judge of the United States District Court for the Middle District of Alabama; 1998–2004	Succeeded by Mark Fuller
