= Ira De Ment =

American judge (1931–2011)

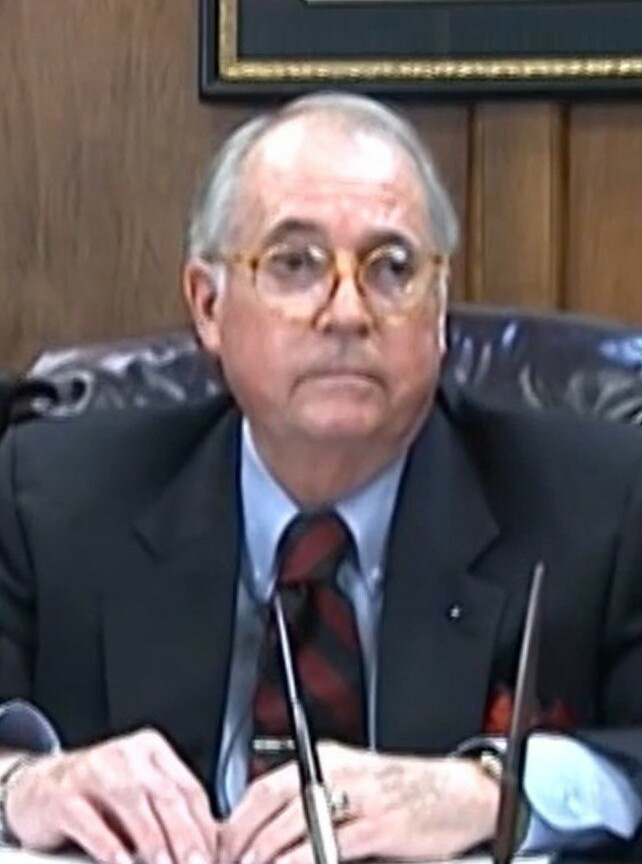

Senior Judge of the United States District Court for the Middle District of Alabama
- In office April 15, 2002 – July 16, 2011

Judge of the United States District Court for the Middle District of Alabama
- In office March 18, 1992 – April 15, 2002
- Appointed by: George H. W. Bush
- Preceded by: Truman McGill Hobbs
- Succeeded by: Mark Fuller

Personal details
- Born: December 21, 1931 Birmingham, Alabama
- Died: July 16, 2011 (aged 79) Montgomery, Alabama
- Education: University of Alabama (BS); University of Alabama School of Law (JD)

Military service
- Allegiance: United States
- Branch/service: United States Army; United States Air Force
- Years of service: 1953 – 1989
- Rank: Major general
- Awards: Legion of Merit; Air Force Distinguished; Service Medal

Ira De Ment (December 21, 1931 – July 16, 2011) was a United States district judge of the United States District Court for the Middle District of Alabama.

== Education and military service ==
De Ment was born on December 21, 1931, in Birmingham, Alabama. De Ment attended Phillips High School in Birmingham in 1945 and graduated in 1949. After his graduation, he attended Marion Military Institute as a military student and graduated in 1951. De Ment received a Bachelor of Science degree from the University of Alabama in 1953 and after graduating from the University of Alabama, De Ment served in the United States Army Infantry in Germany from 1953 to 1955, and in the United States Army Reserve and then the United States Air Force Reserve until 1989. He rose to the rank of major general and was awarded the Air Force Distinguished Service Medal. He previously had received the Legion of Merit. He attended the University of Alabama School of Law and received a Juris Doctor in 1958.

== Legal career ==
De Ment was a law clerk for Justice Pelham J. Merrill of the Supreme Court of Alabama from 1958 to 1959, when he briefly served as an assistant state attorney general of Alabama, and then as an Assistant United States Attorney of the Middle District of Alabama from 1959 to 1961. He was in private practice in Montgomery, Alabama from 1961 to 1969, working as an assistant city attorney for the City of Montgomery, Alabama from 1965 to 1969. He was the United States Attorney for the Middle District of Alabama from 1969 to 1977, returning to private practice in Montgomery until 1992. He was a special counsel to Alabama Governor Fob James from 1980 to 1982, to Governor George C. Wallace from 1983 to 1986, and to Governor Guy Hunt from 1987 to 1988, and in 1991. He was the Chief Judge of the Wake Island Court of Appeals from 1985 to 1992.

== Federal judicial service and death ==
On November 14, 1991, De Ment was nominated by President George H. W. Bush to a seat on the United States District Court for the Middle District of Alabama vacated by Judge Truman McGill Hobbs. De Ment was confirmed by the United States Senate on March 13, 1992, and received his commission on March 18, 1992. He assumed senior status on April 15, 2002. On July 17, 2011, he died of the effects of Parkinson's disease.

== Sources ==
Legal offices
Preceded by Truman McGill Hobbs	Judge of the United States District Court for the Middle District of Alabama; 1992–2002	Succeeded by Mark Fuller
