= George Beck =

George Beck may refer to:

- George Beck (artist) (1749–1812), Anglo-American artist and poet
- George T. Beck (1856–1943), American politician and entrepreneur in Wyoming
- George Beck (baseball) (1890–1973), American baseball player
- George Beck (bishop) (1904–1978), English Roman Catholic Archbishop of Liverpool
- George Beck (1907–1999), American film and TV writer, director and producer (1951's Behave Yourself!)
- George Beck, Canadian country music performer during 1960s who worked with Fred McKenna
- George L. Beck Jr. (born 1941), United States Attorney in Alabama
- George Beck, athlete representing United States at the 2020 Winter Youth Olympics#Ski mountaineering

== See also ==
- Admiral Sir George Back (1796–1878), British Royal Navy explorer of Canadian Arctic, naturalist and artist
- George Lewis Becke (1855–1913), Australian writer
- Lindsay George Beck (1900–1982), Australian rules footballer in SANFL and VFL
