= Judge Kennamer =

Judge Kennamer may refer to:

- Charles Brents Kennamer (1874–1955), judge of the United States District Courts for the Middle and Northern Districts of Alabama
- Franklin Elmore Kennamer (1879–1960), judge of the United States District Courts for the Eastern District and Northern Districts of Oklahoma
