= Alabama Law =

Alabama Law may refer to:

- The University of Alabama School of Law
- The law of Alabama
