= R. Austin Huffaker Jr. =

American judge (born 1973)

Austin Huffaker
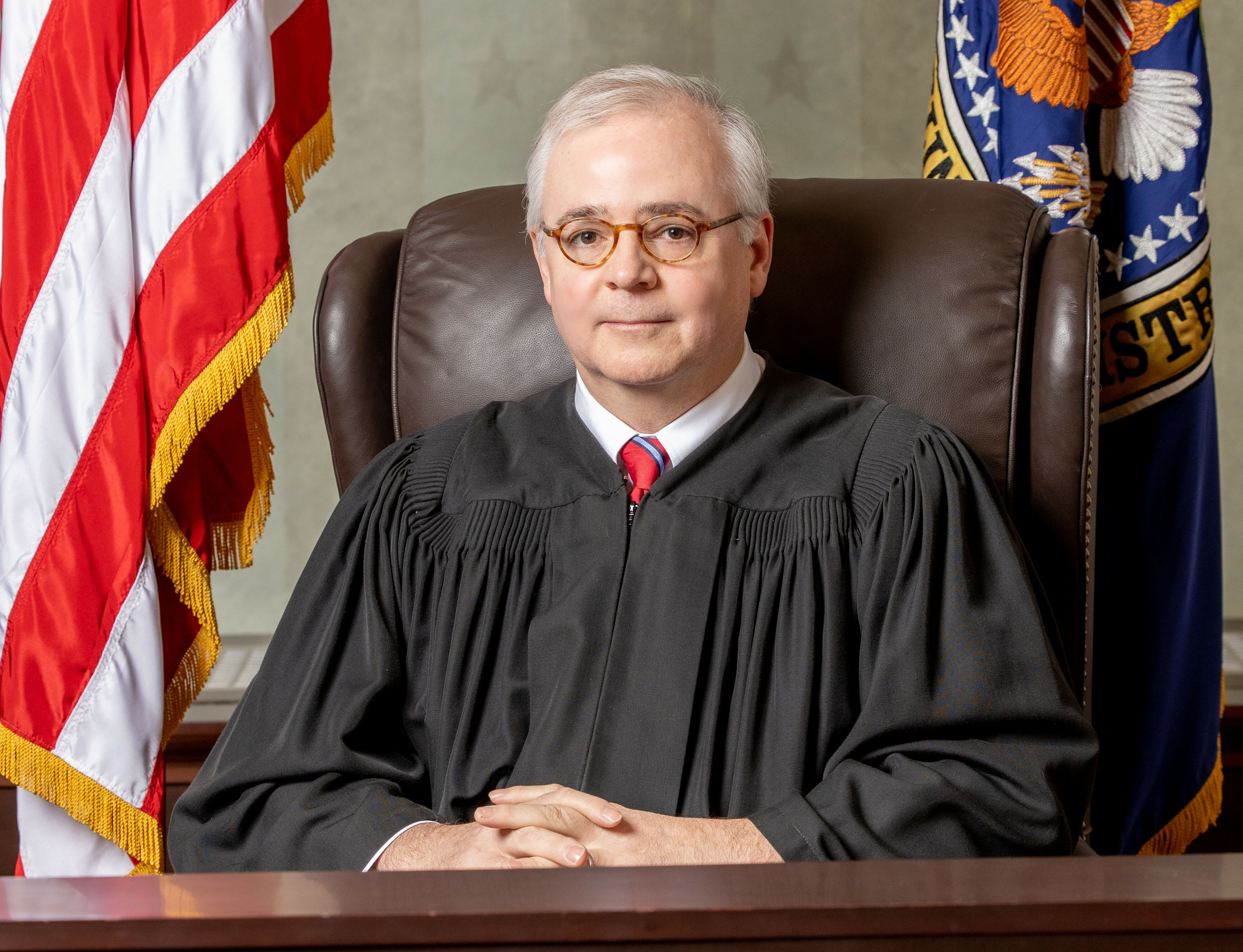

Chief Judge of the United States District Court for the Middle District of Alabama
- Incumbent
- Assumed office January 31, 2026
- Preceded by: Emily Marks

Judge of the United States District Court for the Middle District of Alabama
- Incumbent
- Assumed office December 12, 2019
- Appointed by: Donald Trump
- Preceded by: William Keith Watkins

Personal details
- Born: Robert Austin Huffaker Jr. 1973 (age 52–53) Montgomery, Alabama, U.S.
- Education: Vanderbilt University (BS); University of Alabama (JD)

Robert Austin Huffaker Jr. (born 1973) is the chief United States district judge of the United States District Court for the Middle District of Alabama.

== Biography ==
Huffaker received a Bachelor of Engineering from Vanderbilt University and a Juris Doctor from the University of Alabama School of Law. Huffaker served as a commissioner of the Alabama Securities Commission and as a member of the Alabama Civil Jury Charge Committee.

== Federal judicial service ==
On July 1, 2019, President Donald Trump announced his intent to nominate Huffaker to serve as a United States District Judge of the United States District Court for the Middle District of Alabama. Huffaker is nominated to the seat vacated by Judge William Keith Watkins, who assumed senior status on January 31, 2019. On July 8, 2019, his nomination was sent to the United States Senate. On July 31, 2019, a hearing on his nomination was held before the Senate Judiciary Committee. On October 17, 2019, his nomination was reported out of committee by a 19–3 vote. On December 3, 2019, the Senate invoked cloture on his nomination by a 88–4 vote. On December 4, 2019, his nomination was confirmed by a 89–4 vote. He received his judicial commission on December 12, 2019. He became chief judge in 2026.

Legal offices
Preceded by William Keith Watkins	Judge of the United States District Court for the Middle District of Alabama; 2019–present	Incumbent
Preceded by Emily C. Marks	Chief Judge of the United States District Court for the Middle District of Alabama; 2026–present	Incumbent
