= William Keith Watkins =

American judge (born 1951)

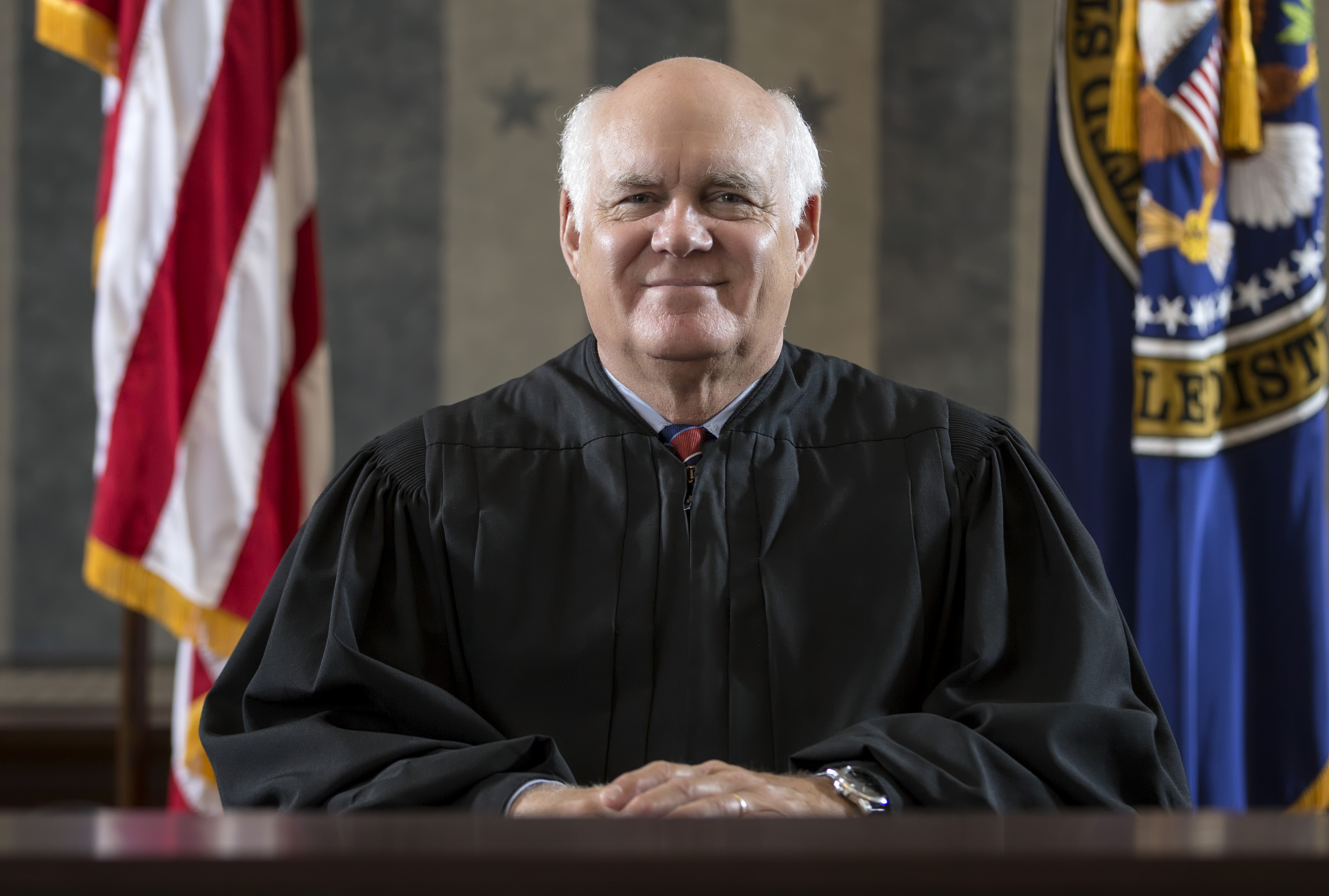

Senior Judge of the United States District Court for the Middle District of Alabama
- Incumbent
- Assumed office January 31, 2019

Chief Judge of the United States District Court for the Middle District of Alabama
- In office May 18, 2011 – January 31, 2019
- Preceded by: Mark Fuller
- Succeeded by: Emily C. Marks

Judge of the United States District Court for the Middle District of Alabama
- In office December 27, 2005 – January 31, 2019
- Appointed by: George W. Bush
- Preceded by: Harold Albritton
- Succeeded by: R. Austin Huffaker Jr.

Personal details
- Born: William Keith Watkins; July 5, 1951 (age 74) Pike County, Alabama
- Education: Auburn University (BS); University of Alabama (JD)

William Keith Watkins (born July 5, 1951) is a senior United States district judge of the United States District Court for the Middle District of Alabama.

== Education and career ==
Born in Pike County, Alabama, Watkins received a Bachelor of Science degree in Political Science from Auburn University in 1973 and a Juris Doctor from the University of Alabama School of Law in 1976. He was in private practice in Tuscaloosa, Alabama, from 1976-1978 and then in Troy, Alabama, from 1978-2005.

== Federal judicial service ==
On September 28, 2005, Watkins was nominated by President George W. Bush to a seat on the United States District Court for the Middle District of Alabama vacated by Harold Albritton. Watkins was confirmed by the United States Senate on December 21, 2005, and received his commission on December 27, 2005. He served as Chief Judge from 2011 to 2019. He assumed senior status on January 31, 2019.

== Notable ruling ==
In April 2017, Watkins issued an order enabling white supremacist Richard B. Spencer to speak at Auburn University despite an initial cancelation by the administrators. In July 2017, Watkins found that Alabama did not need to notify formerly disenfranchised ex-felons of new legislation allowing them to vote.

== Sources ==
Legal offices
Preceded by Harold Albritton	Judge of the United States District Court for the Middle District of Alabama; 2005–2019	Succeeded by R. Austin Huffaker Jr.
Preceded by Mark Fuller	Chief Judge of the United States District Court for the Middle District of Alabama; 2011–2019	Succeeded by Emily Coody Marks
