= Robert Edward Varner =

American judge

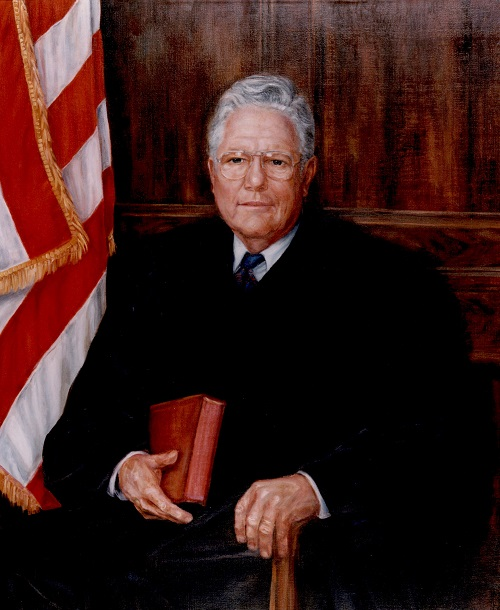
- Portrait of Varner

Senior Judge of the United States District Court for the Middle District of Alabama
- In office June 12, 1986 – May 17, 2006

Chief Judge of the United States District Court for the Middle District of Alabama
- In office 1979–1984
- Preceded by: Frank Minis Johnson
- Succeeded by: Truman McGill Hobbs

Judge of the United States District Court for the Middle District of Alabama
- In office April 23, 1971 – June 12, 1986
- Appointed by: Richard Nixon
- Preceded by: Seat established by 84 Stat. 294
- Succeeded by: Joel Fredrick Dubina

Personal details
- Born: June 11, 1921 Montgomery, Alabama
- Died: May 17, 2006 (aged 84)
- Education: Auburn University (B.S.); University of Alabama School of Law (J.D.)

Robert Edward Varner (June 11, 1921 – May 17, 2006) was a United States district judge of the United States District Court for the Middle District of Alabama.

== Education and career ==
Born in Montgomery, Alabama, Varner received a Bachelor of Science degree from Auburn University in 1942 and was a United States Naval Aviator Lieutenant (JG) during World War II, from 1942 to 1946. He received a Juris Doctor from the University of Alabama School of Law in 1949. He was in private practice in Tuskegee, Alabama from 1949 to 1954. He was a member of the Macon County Board of Education from 1950 to 1954, serving as Chairman in 1954. He was also Tuskegee's city attorney in 1951. He was an Assistant United States Attorney of the Middle District of Alabama from 1954 to 1958, returning to private practice in Montgomery from 1958 to 1971.

== Federal judicial service ==
On February 10, 1971, Varner was nominated by President Richard Nixon to a new seat on the United States District Court for the Middle District of Alabama created by 84 Stat. 294. Varner was confirmed by the United States Senate on April 21, 1971, and received his commission on April 23, 1971. He served as Chief Judge from 1979 to 1984, assuming senior status on June 12, 1986 and serving in that capacity until his death on May 17, 2006.

== Sources ==
Legal offices
Preceded by Seat established by 84 Stat. 294	Judge of the United States District Court for the Middle District of Alabama; 1971–1986	Succeeded by Joel Fredrick Dubina
Preceded by Frank Minis Johnson	Chief Judge of the United States District Court for the Middle District of Alabama; 1979–1984	Succeeded by Truman McGill Hobbs
