= Garcia-Mir v. Meese =

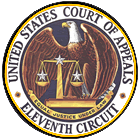
- Court: United States Court of Appeals for the Eleventh Circuit
- Full case name: Moises Garcia-Mir, Rafael Fernandez-Roque, et al. v. United States Attorney General Edwin Meese, III, et al.
- Decided: April 23 1986
- Citations: 788 F.2d 1446, 54 USLW 2561, 1986 U.S. App. LEXIS 24696

Case history
- Prior history: Claims upheld by United States District Court for the Northern District of Georgia; motion for stay denied, 781 F.2d 1450 (11th Cir. 1986)

Holding
- Northern District of Georgia ruling overturned in part and affirmed in part; reversing: plaintiffs found to have no protected liberty interests resulting from actions of the executive branch; affirming: plaintiffs have no action under international law.

Court membership
- Judges sitting: Circuit Judges Robert Smith Vance, Frank Minis Johnson, Senior Circuit Judge Clarence W. Allgood

Case opinions
- Majority: Johnson, joined by Vance, Allgood

Laws applied
- 8 U.S.C. § 1227, U.S. Const. Amends. V, XIV

Garcia-Mir v. Meese, 788 F.2d 1446 (11th Cir. 1986), was a decision by the Eleventh Circuit Court of Appeals, which ruled that the United States could indefinitely detain Cuban refugees who had arrived during the 1980 Mariel boatlift.

== Background ==
In 1980, 10,000 Cubans took refuge on the grounds of the Peruvian Embassy in Havana in the hope of being granted asylum and allowed to emigrate. For several months the Cuban government allowed those wishing to emigrate to depart via the Port of Mariel. Some of those permitted to leave had recently been released from prisons and mental institutions. In response, the United States enacted the Refugee Education Assistance Act (8. U.S.C. § 1522), which provided funds for both the resettlement of Cuban immigrants and the incarceration and deportation of those deemed ineligible for refugee status.

U.S. Attorney General Edwin Meese, with the approval of President Ronald Reagan, proposed splitting the recent arrivals into two classes: one containing those previously convicted of crimes in Cuba, and another for those Cubans with no criminal records. Both classes were held at the Federal Penitentiary in Atlanta, Georgia.

Two of the refugees, Moises Garcia-Mir and Rafael Fernandez-Roque, were detained upon their arrival in Florida as possible security threats and held in Atlanta to await possible deportation. They filed suit in the District Court for Northern Georgia, asserting violations of both the due process clause of the Fifth and Fourteenth Amendments. The District Court agreed with their claims. On November 25, 1985, it ordered Meese to submit a plan to hold a parole hearing for each of the plaintiffs within thirty days and to hold such hearings within sixty days. A parole hearing, sometimes called a detention hearing, would determine whether the person is entitled to release from federal custody or properly held in anticipation of his return to Cuba. The U.S. Justice Department appealed to the Eleventh Circuit, making an emergency motion to suspend the District Courts orders.

== Initial review ==
The Eleventh Circuit considered the Attorney General's appeal on an emergency basis and released its opinion on January 21, 1986. It reviewed the history of the case. It had reversed the District Court's finding that the plaintiffs had constitutional claims and instructed the court to consider whether the plaintiffs had non-constitutional claims or claims under international law. The District Court had determined that "several actions taken and documents issued by the Executive Branch under the administration of President Jimmy Carter had the effect of extending an 'invitation' to the class members to come to this country and concomitantly effected limitations on administrative discretion sufficient to create a protectable liberty interest in securing a parole hearing." The District Court had outlined the requirements of the hearing due each plaintiff, some of which the government found objectionable.

The Circuit Court said that the Cubans in question were "excludable aliens," considered by law not yet in the United States, but the lower court found their status was somewhat different from typical "excludable aliens" in that they had been allowed to "journey to and disembark in this country without meeting the usual documentary requirements imposed by the Immigration and Naturalization Service." The Circuit Court was uncertain on that question but turned to other criteria for determining whether to grant the Attorney General's request to stay the District Court's orders. It found the Cubans would suffer substantially without the relief offered by the District Court and the public interest was not at risk from hearings but also that the government would be injured by having to hold hearings when the government has a reasonable chance of persuading the court that these hearings are not required.

The Circuit Court ordered the government to present plans for hearings as the District Court had ordered, but it stayed that court's order that hearings be held pending further consideration of the merits of the case, that is, whether actions of the executive branch had created a liberty interest that the Cubans could assert.

== Opinion ==
After full briefing, the Eleventh Circuit issued its opinion by Judge Clarence W. Allgood on April 23, 1986. It found the Cubans had not demonstrated the sort of executive branch actions that are normally associated with the establishment of a liberty interest, that "they fail to demonstrate the existence of the particularized standards of review that yield a protected liberty interest." It noted in particular that the 1980 Refugee Education Assistance Act Act created a special status for them "only for the purpose of providing social welfare benefits," not for any other recognition of their status with respect to immigration. It found they had no claims under international law. In summary, Judge Allgood wrote: "the Mariels have failed to demonstrate the existence of any significant restrictions on the discretion of Executive actors." The decision reversed the lower court's finding that the Cuban refugees had such a liberty interest, and affirmed the lower court's finding that international law did not apply.

== Impact ==
The case was the subject of debate as to whether actions by the U.S. executive branch, absent Congressional action, could support the abrogation of customary rights under international law. In this context, the case holding is summarized as "upholding action of Attorney General authorizing detention of aliens in violation of international law."
