= Myron H. Thompson =

American judge (born 1947)

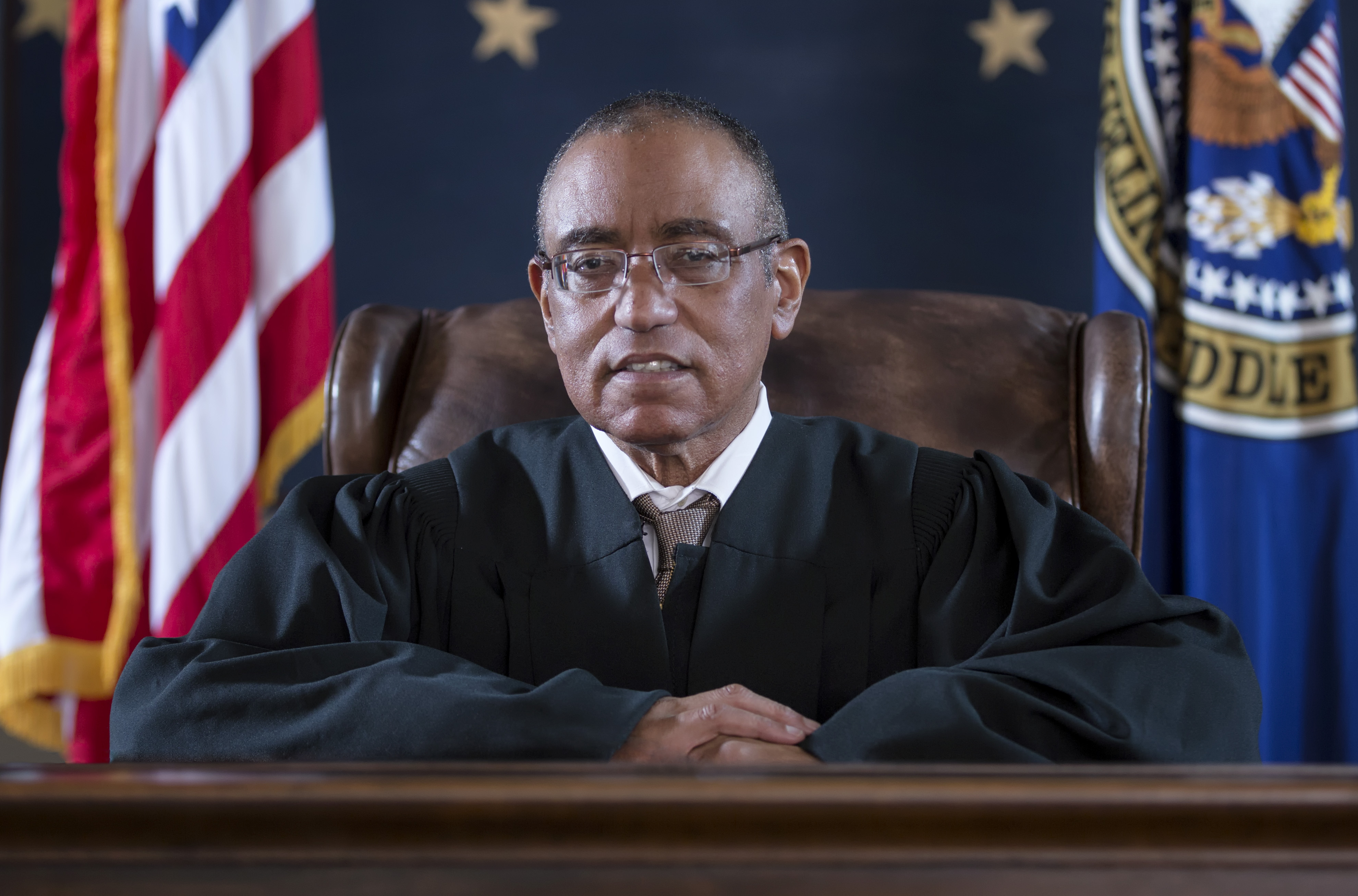
- Thompson in 2017

Senior Judge of the United States District Court for the Middle District of Alabama
- Incumbent
- Assumed office August 22, 2013

Chief Judge of the United States District Court for the Middle District of Alabama
- In office 1991–1998
- Preceded by: Truman McGill Hobbs
- Succeeded by: Harold Albritton

Judge of the United States District Court for the Middle District of Alabama
- In office September 29, 1980 – August 22, 2013
- Appointed by: Jimmy Carter
- Preceded by: Frank Minis Johnson
- Succeeded by: Emily C. Marks

Personal details
- Born: Myron Herbert Thompson; January 7, 1947 (age 79) Tuskegee, Alabama
- Education: Yale University (BA, JD)

Myron Herbert Thompson (born January 7, 1947) is a senior United States district judge of the United States District Court for the Middle District of Alabama. In 2026, he was elected to the American Philosophical Society.

== Education and career ==
Born in Tuskegee, Alabama, Thompson received a Bachelor of Arts degree from Yale University in 1969 and a Juris Doctor from Yale Law School in 1972. He was an Assistant Attorney General of Alabama from 1972 to 1974, and the first African American to hold this position, and then in private practice in Dothan, Alabama until 1980.

== Federal judicial service ==
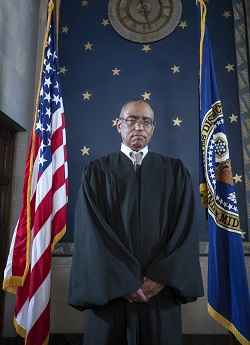
Judge Thompson's portrait.

On September 17, 1980, Thompson was nominated by President Jimmy Carter to a seat on the United States District Court for the Middle District of Alabama vacated by Judge Frank Minis Johnson. Thompson was confirmed by the United States Senate on September 26, 1980, and received his commission on September 29, 1980. He served as Chief Judge from 1991 to 1998, and he was the first African American Chief Judge of any U.S. District Court in the State of Alabama. He took senior status on August 22, 2013. As of 2025, he is the last Democratic appointee to serve on the District Court for the Middle District of Alabama, and also the last judge appointed by a Democratic president to that court.

== Notable cases ==
In 2013, in a redistricting case heard by a three-judge panel, Thompson disagreed with its decision contending it was an illegal use of racial quotas. He wrote that Alabama's use of the Voting Rights Act was a "cruel irony," that as the state was simultaneously arguing before the Supreme Court in Shelby County v. Holder, that Section 5 should be found unconstitutional, it was "relying on racial quotas…and seeking to justify those quotas with the very provision it was helping to render inert." On October 29, 2019, Judge Thompson issued a preliminary injunction blocking the Human Life Protection Act from taking effect in Alabama as prescribed on November 15, 2019. The Alabama law "imposes criminal liability on abortion providers for nearly all abortions, completed or attempted, regardless of fetal viability." In essence," the Court said, "the Act imposes a near-total ban on abortion." Judge Thompson concluded, "The court is persuaded that the plaintiffs are likely to succeed in showing that the Act violates an individual’s constitutional right to obtain a pre-viability abortion, and thus that it violates her constitutional rights." In 2014, in Planned Parenthood Southeast, Inc., v. Strange, (also known as Planned Parenthood Southeast, Inc., v. Bentley), Thompson ruled an Alabama law regulating abortion unconstitutional, citing the undue burden standard.

== See also ==
- List of African-American federal judges
- List of African-American jurists
- List of United States federal judges by longevity of service

== Sources ==
Legal offices
Preceded by Frank Minis Johnson	Judge of the United States District Court for the Middle District of Alabama; 1980–2013	Succeeded by Emily C. Marks
Preceded by Truman McGill Hobbs	Chief Judge of the United States District Court for the Middle District of Alabama; 1991–1998	Succeeded by Harold Albritton
