= Louis V. Franklin Sr. =

American lawyer (born 1958)

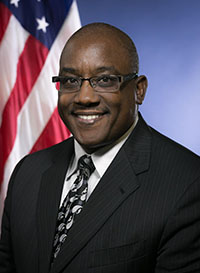

United States Attorney for the Middle District of Alabama
- In office September 21, 2017 – February 26, 2021
- President: Donald Trump; Joe Biden
- Preceded by: George L. Beck Jr.
- Succeeded by: Sandra Stewart (acting)

Personal details
- Born: Louis Vinson Franklin; 1958 (age 67–68) Montgomery, Alabama, U.S.
- Education: University of Alabama, (BA); Auburn University at Montgomery, (MS); Howard University School of Law, (JD)

Louis Vinson Franklin Sr. (born 1958) is an American lawyer who served as the United States attorney for the Middle District of Alabama from 2017 to 2021.

== Education and legal career ==
Franklin received his Bachelor of Arts from the University of Alabama in 1981, his Master of Science from Auburn University at Montgomery in 1983, and his Juris Doctor from Howard University School of Law in 1987. He was a staff attorney at Legal Services Corporation from 1987 to 1990. Franklin was an Assistant United States Attorney from 1990 to 1996 and from 1998 to 2001. From 1996 to 1998, he was an associate at Sirote and Permutt. Franklin has been employed by the United States Attorney's Office for the Middle District of Alabama for nearly 27 years, including as criminal chief for nearly 16 years.

== United States Attorney ==
In June 2017, Franklin was nominated by President Donald Trump to become the United States Attorney for the Middle District of Alabama. He was confirmed by voice vote on September 14, 2017. On February 8, 2021, he along with 55 other attorneys were asked to resign. Franklin retired on February 26, 2021.
