= Andrew L. Brasher =

American judge (born 1981)

Andrew Brasher
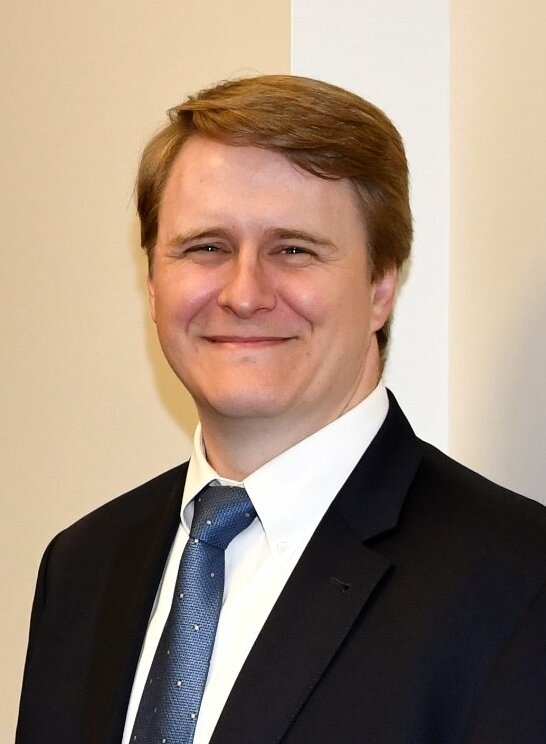
- Brasher in 2022

Judge of the United States Court of Appeals for the Eleventh Circuit
- Incumbent
- Assumed office June 30, 2020
- Appointed by: Donald Trump
- Preceded by: Edward Earl Carnes

Judge of the United States District Court for the Middle District of Alabama
- In office May 3, 2019 – June 30, 2020
- Appointed by: Donald Trump
- Preceded by: Mark Fuller
- Succeeded by: Bill Lewis

Solicitor General of Alabama
- In office February 11, 2014 – May 3, 2019
- Governor: Robert J. Bentley; Kay Ivey
- Preceded by: John Neiman
- Succeeded by: Edmund LaCour

Personal details
- Born: Andrew Lynn Brasher; May 20, 1981 (age 45) Milan, Tennessee, U.S.
- Party: Republican
- Education: Samford University (BA); Harvard University (JD)

Andrew Lynn Brasher (born May 20, 1981) is a United States circuit judge of the United States Court of Appeals for the Eleventh Circuit and a former United States district judge of the United States District Court for the Middle District of Alabama. He is a former solicitor general of Alabama.

== Early life and career ==
Brasher received a Bachelor of Arts, summa cum laude, from Samford University in 2002, and a Juris Doctor, cum laude, from Harvard Law School in 2006, where he was a member of the Harvard Law Review and earned the Victor Brudney Prize. While in law school, Brasher was a summer associate at Gibson, Dunn & Crutcher in 2005. After law school, served as a law clerk to Judge William H. Pryor Jr. of the United States Court of Appeals for the Eleventh Circuit from 2006 to 2007. He then worked in the Birmingham office of Bradley Arant Boult Cummings from 2007 to 2011. From 2011 to 2014, Brasher became Deputy Solicitor General of Alabama under state Attorney General Luther Strange.

He was promoted to Solicitor General in February 2014 and continued to serve in that role until his appointment as a federal district judge in 2019.

== Federal judicial service ==
=== District court service ===
On April 10, 2018, President Donald Trump nominated Brasher to serve as a United States district judge of the United States District Court for the Middle District of Alabama. He was nominated to the seat vacated by Judge Mark Fuller, who resigned under the threat of impeachment on August 1, 2015. On June 6, 2018 a hearing on his nomination was held before the Senate Judiciary Committee. On June 28, 2018, his nomination was reported out of committee by an 11–10 vote.

On January 3, 2019, his nomination was returned to the President under Rule XXXI, Paragraph 6, of the United States Senate. On January 23, Trump announced his intent to renominate Brasher for a federal judgeship. His nomination was sent to the Senate later that day. On February 7, 2019, his nomination was reported out of committee by a 12–10 vote.

On May 1, 2019, the Senate invoked cloture on his nomination by a 52–47 vote. His nomination was confirmed that same day by a 52–47 vote. He received his judicial commission on May 3, 2019. He was sworn into office on May 7, 2019. His district court service terminated on June 30, 2020, when he was elevated to the court of appeals.

=== Court of appeals service ===
On November 6, 2019, President Donald Trump announced his intent to nominate Brasher to serve as a United States circuit judge of the United States Court of Appeals for the Eleventh Circuit. On November 21, 2019, his nomination was sent to the Senate. Trump nominated Brasher to the seat to be vacated by Judge Edward Earl Carnes, who had announced his intention to assume senior status upon confirmation of a successor. A hearing on his nomination before the Senate Judiciary Committee was held on December 4, 2019. On January 3, 2020, his nomination was returned to the President under Rule XXXI, Paragraph 6 of the United States Senate. Later that day, he was renominated to the same seat. On January 16, 2020, his nomination was reported out of committee by a 12–10 vote. On February 10, 2020, the Senate invoked cloture on his nomination by a 46–41 vote. On February 11, 2020, his nomination was confirmed by a 52–43 vote. He received his judicial commission June 30, 2020, and he was sworn in the same day.

== Memberships ==
He was a member of the Federalist Society from 2003 to 2006 and again since 2008.

== See also ==
- Donald Trump judicial appointment controversies

Legal offices
Preceded by Mark Fuller	Judge of the United States District Court for the Middle District of Alabama; 2019–2020	Succeeded by Bill Lewis
Preceded by Edward Earl Carnes	Judge of the United States Court of Appeals for the Eleventh Circuit; 2020–present	Incumbent
