= Kevin Newsom =

American judge (born 1972)

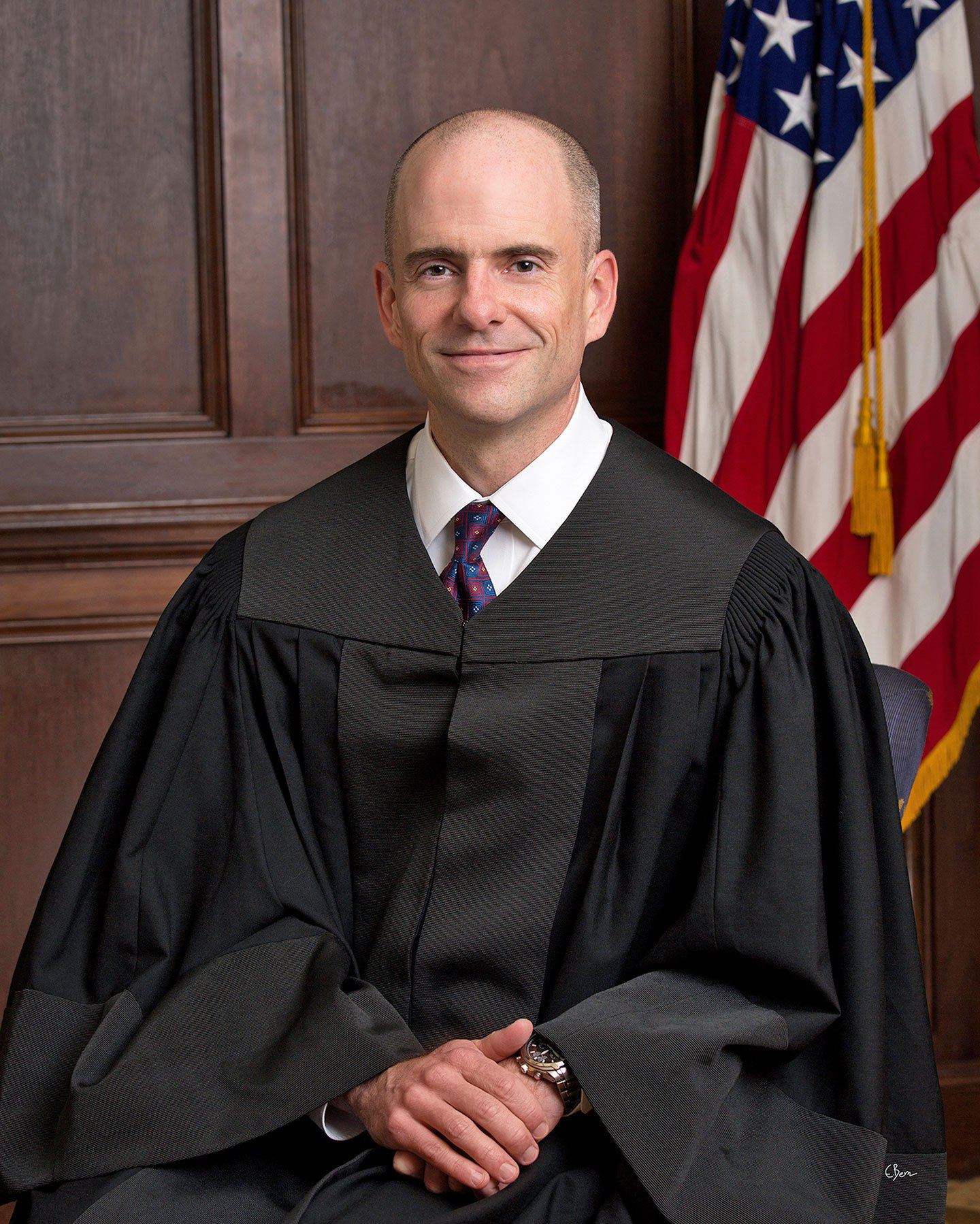

Judge of the United States Court of Appeals for the Eleventh Circuit
- Incumbent
- Assumed office August 2, 2017
- Appointed by: Donald Trump
- Preceded by: Joel Fredrick Dubina

Solicitor General of Alabama
- In office December 2003 – June 2007
- Governor: Bob Riley
- Preceded by: Nathan Forrester
- Succeeded by: Corey L. Maze

Personal details
- Born: Kevin Christopher Newsom; September 22, 1972 (age 54) Birmingham, Alabama, U.S.
- Spouse: Deborah Wilgus (m. 1994)
- Children: 2
- Education: Samford University (BA); Harvard University (JD)

Kevin Christopher Newsom (born September 22, 1972) is an American attorney and jurist serving as a United States circuit judge of the United States Court of Appeals for the Eleventh Circuit.

== Early life and education ==
Kevin Newsom was born in Birmingham, Alabama, to Susan and Michael Alan Newsom. His father was an attorney. Newsom attended Homewood High School in Birmingham. Both of his parents had issues with alcoholism.

In 1994, Newsom received a Bachelor of Arts, summa cum laude, from Samford University, graduating first in his class. In 1997, he graduated from Harvard Law School with a Juris Doctor, magna cum laude, where he was an articles editor of the Harvard Law Review.

== Career ==
After graduation, Newsom served as a law clerk to Judge Diarmuid O'Scannlain of the United States Court of Appeals for the Ninth Circuit from 1997 to 1998. He then clerked for Justice David Souter of the Supreme Court of the United States from 1998 to 1999.

Between and after his clerkships, he worked for Covington & Burling in Washington, D.C. In December 2003, he was appointed the State of Alabama's second Solicitor General, replacing Nathan A. Forrester, and served for three and a half years under state Attorneys General William H. Pryor Jr. and Troy King. While serving as Solicitor General, Newsom argued 18 cases, including 3 before the United States Supreme Court. Afterwards, Newsom was a partner at Bradley Arant Boult Cummings LLP in Birmingham, where his practice focused on appellate law.

Newsom serves on the Board of Overseers of Samford University. He is a member of the Federalist Society and the American Law Institute.

== Federal judicial service ==
On May 8, 2017, President Donald Trump nominated Newsom to a seat on the United States Court of Appeals for the Eleventh Circuit vacated by Judge Joel Fredrick Dubina, who assumed senior status on October 26, 2013. A hearing on his nomination before the Senate Judiciary Committee took place on June 14, 2017. On July 13, 2017, his nomination was reported out of committee by a 18–2 vote. On July 31, 2017, the United States Senate invoked cloture on his nomination by a 68–26 vote. On August 1, 2017, his nomination was confirmed by a 66–31 vote. He received his judicial commission on August 2, 2017.

=== Notable rulings ===
- In June 2020, Newsom wrote for the divided panel when it vacated a lower court's injunction ordering the Miami-Dade County Corrections and Rehabilitation Department to enforce social distancing and take other preventative measures to protect prisoners from COVID-19.
- On May 23, 2022, Newsom, joined by Tjoflat and Ed Carnes, ruled in Moody v. NetChoice that several provisions of Florida's social media moderation law were unconstitutional, but several others were constitutional. The Supreme Court remanded the case in July 2024.

== Personal life ==
In 1994, Newsom married Deborah E. Wilgus, who also attended Samford University, and they have two children.

== See also ==
- List of law clerks for the third seat of the Supreme Court of the United States
- Donald Trump Supreme Court candidates

== Selected works ==
- Newsom, Kevin Christopher (January 2000). "Setting Incorporationism Straight: A Reinterpretation of the Slaughter-House Cases". The Yale Law Journal. 109 (4): 643–744. doi:10.2307/797502. JSTOR 797502.

Legal offices
Preceded by Joel Fredrick Dubina	Judge of the United States Court of Appeals for the Eleventh Circuit; 2017–present	Incumbent
