= Frank Minis Johnson =

American judge (1918–1999)

Frank Johnson
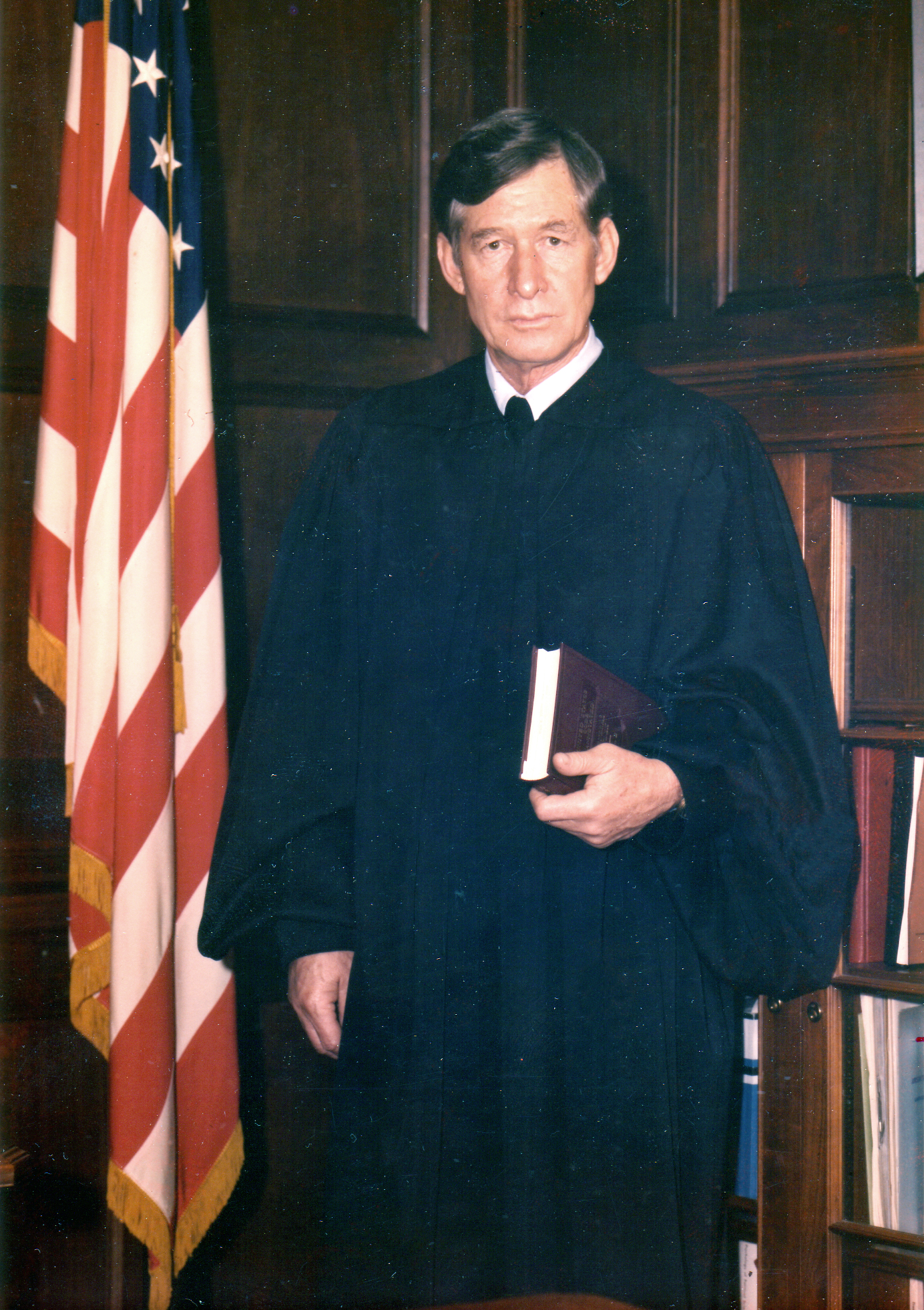

Senior Judge of the United States Court of Appeals for the Eleventh Circuit
- In office October 30, 1991 – July 23, 1999

Judge of the United States Court of Appeals for the Eleventh Circuit
- In office October 1, 1981 – October 30, 1991
- Preceded by: Seat established
- Succeeded by: Edward Earl Carnes

Judge of the United States Court of Appeals for the Fifth Circuit
- In office June 21, 1979 – October 1, 1981
- Appointed by: Jimmy Carter
- Preceded by: Seat established
- Succeeded by: Seat abolished

Chief Judge of the United States District Court for the Middle District of Alabama
- In office June 29, 1966 – June 21, 1979
- Preceded by: Position established
- Succeeded by: Robert Edward Varner

Judge of the United States District Court for the Middle District of Alabama
- In office October 22, 1955 – June 21, 1979
- Appointed by: Dwight D. Eisenhower
- Preceded by: Charles Brents Kennamer
- Succeeded by: Myron H. Thompson

Personal details
- Born: Frank Minis Johnson Jr. October 30, 1918 Delmar, Alabama, U.S.
- Died: July 23, 1999 (aged 80) Montgomery, Alabama, U.S.
- Party: Republican
- Spouse: Ruth Jenkins (m. 1938)
- Education: University of Alabama (LLB)

Frank Minis Johnson Jr. (October 30, 1918 – July 23, 1999) was a United States district judge and United States circuit judge, who served from 1955 to 1999 on the United States District Court for the Middle District of Alabama, United States Court of Appeals for the Fifth Circuit and United States Court of Appeals for the Eleventh Circuit. He made landmark civil rights rulings that helped end segregation and disenfranchisement of African Americans in the South. In the words of journalist and historian Bill Moyers, Judge Johnson "altered forever the face of the South."

== Early life, education and career ==
Johnson was born in 1918 in Delmar, Alabama, and grew up in nearby Haleyville in northern Alabama, a longtime independent-minded part of the state. Winston County had opposed secession during the American Civil War.

Johnson graduated from the University of Alabama and later the University of Alabama School of Law with a Bachelor of Laws in 1943, and was admitted to the bar. While a student, he was asked by a staunchly Democratic classmate why he insisted upon being a Republican, to which Johnson replied that there were "so few of us that one day I might be a federal judge." Another classmate, George Wallace, future governor of the state, overheard the remark and replied, "Well, that'll be the day. I'll be governor by then." Wallace would prove to be Johnson's bête noire during the civil rights era of the 1960s.

He married Ruth Jenkins, a classmate from the University of Alabama. Johnson served in the United States Army in Europe during World War II, while his wife Ruth served in the WAVES as an adviser to Hollywood directors making films about the war.

After military service, Johnson entered private law practice in Jasper from 1946 to 1953. Unlike most white voters of the time in Alabama, he became active in politics with the Republican Party, serving as a delegate to the 1948 Republican National Convention. He managed Alabama's "Veterans for Eisenhower" group during the 1952 campaign. Johnson was known as a foe of the Democratic Party's segregationist policies. He was appointed as the United States Attorney for the Northern District of Alabama from 1953 to 1955, during President Dwight D. Eisenhower's administration.

== Federal judicial service ==
Johnson received a recess appointment from President Dwight D. Eisenhower on October 22, 1955, to a seat on the United States District Court for the Middle District of Alabama vacated by Judge Charles Kennamer. He was nominated to the same position on January 12, 1956. He was confirmed by the United States Senate on January 31, 1956, and received his commission on February 1, 1956. He served as chief judge from 1966 to 1979. His service terminated on July 12, 1979, due to his elevation to the Fifth Circuit.

=== Notable district court case and incidents ===
In 1956, Johnson ruled in favor of Rosa Parks, striking down the "blacks in the back of the bus" law of the city of Montgomery Alabama, as unconstitutional. In orders issued in 1961 and 1962, he ordered the desegregation of bus depots (such as the Montgomery Greyhound station) and the Montgomery Regional Airport in Alabama's Middle judicial district. In 1961 he ordered the Ku Klux Klan and Montgomery police to stop the beating and harassment of Freedom Riders attempting to integrate interstate bus travel.

In March 1965, Johnson ruled that activists had the right to undertake the Selma to Montgomery march as a means to petition the government, overturning Governor George Wallace's prohibition of the march as contrary to public safety. Thousands of sympathizers traveled to Selma to join the march, which had 25,000 participants by its last leg into Montgomery on March 25, 1965. It was considered integral to gaining passage by Congress of the Voting Rights Act of 1965.

Johnson received death threats and ostracism for his role in advancing civil rights, and was protected by federal marshals for nearly two decades. A burning cross was placed on his lawn in 1956 following the Rosa Parks decision, and his mother's house was bombed in 1967, although she was not hurt.

Johnson was nominated by President Jimmy Carter on April 2, 1979, to the United States Court of Appeals for the Fifth Circuit, to a new seat established by 92 Stat. 1629. He was confirmed by the Senate on June 19, 1979, and received his commission on June 21, 1979. His service terminated on October 1, 1981, due to reassignment to the Eleventh Circuit.

Johnson was reassigned to the newly established United States Court of Appeals for the Eleventh Circuit by operation of law on October 1, 1981. He assumed senior status on October 30, 1991. He was succeeded on the bench by Judge Edward Earl Carnes. His service terminated on July 23, 1999, upon his death.

Johnson additionally served on the Temporary Emergency Court of Appeals from 1972 to 1982.

Johnson served more than 40 years on the federal bench. At the memorial service after his death, he was praised by former United States Senator Howell Heflin, Democrat of Alabama, who said that the judge's "unrelenting devotion to the rule of law" helped him strike down segregation laws.

=== FBI director nomination ===
In 1977 President Carter and Attorney General Griffin Bell asked Johnson to become FBI Director when Director Clarence M. Kelley stepped down. But, the day after Carter nominated him, Johnson was found to have an aneurysm, or abnormal swelling, of his abdominal aorta. His nomination had to be withdrawn and William H. Webster was nominated in his place.

== Personal life and death ==
Johnson died at his home in Montgomery of pneumonia after being briefly hospitalized for a fall at his home the week prior.

== Legacy and honors ==
- 1978, Golden Plate Award of the American Academy of Achievement presented by Awards Council member Judge John Sirica
- 1979, inducted into the Alabama Academy of Honor
- 1992, Frank M. Johnson Jr. Federal Building and United States Courthouse, where Johnson served in Montgomery, Alabama, was named for him
- 1993, American Bar Association's annual Thurgood Marshall Award
- 1995, Presidential Medal of Freedom

=== The Judge Frank M. Johnson, Jr. Institute ===
Judge Johnson's impact led to the creation of the Judge Frank M. Johnson, Jr. Institute. The Johnson Institute became a non-partisan voice that shares the stories of the American Constitution and the American Judiciary through programs that illuminate issues and perspectives, foster thoughtful and civil discourse, and inspire our national community in our nation's never-ending pursuit of a more perfect union.

== Notable decisions ==
- Browder v. Gayle (1956)

Ordered the racial integration of the public transportation system of the city of Montgomery, Alabama.

- Gomillion v. Lightfoot (1961)

Invalidated a plan by the city of Tuskegee, Alabama to dilute potential black voting strength by redrawing city boundaries so as to exclude concentrations of black voters from the city.

- United States v. Alabama (1961)

Ordered that black persons be registered to vote if their application papers were equal to the performance of the least qualified white applicant accepted on the voting rolls.

- Lewis v. Greyhound (1961),

Required desegregation of the bus depots of the city of Montgomery, as these served interstate buses operating under federal law.

- United States v. City of Montgomery (1961)

Ordered the city of Montgomery to surrender its voting registration records to the US Department of Justice; DOJ was studying why so few African Americans were registered to vote in a state with numerous majority-black counties.

- United States v. City of Montgomery, 201 F. Supp. 590 - Dist. Court, MD Alabama 1962

Required desegregation of airport and related facilities at Dannelly Field in the city of Montgomery

- Sims v. Frink (1962)

Required the state of Alabama to reapportion state legislative districts to adhere to the 'one man, one vote' principle as stipulated in its 1901 constitution. The state districts had not been reapportioned since that date, although such reapportionment was supposed to take place following every decennial census. This had resulted in marked under-representation of urban citizens, as demographic changes had created density of population in urbanized cities and areas

- Lee v. Macon County Board of Ed. (1963)

Mandated, in Alabama, the first statewide desegregation of public schools.

- Williams v. Wallace (1965)

Ordered Gov. George Wallace in March 1965 to permit the Selma to Montgomery march to take place, which was organized by the Southern Christian Leadership Conference (SCLC), DCVL and SNCC.

- White v. Crook (1966)

Ruled that the state of Alabama must permit both male and female Blacks to serve on juries; they were qualified after regaining the ability to register and vote. The case was brought as a class action suit on behalf of black residents on Lowndes County, Alabama; other class members joined so that the decision applied to the state. It was "one of the first civil actions brought to remedy systematic exclusion of Negroes from jury service generally."

- United States v. Alabama (1966)

Declared the Alabama poll tax unconstitutional.

- Weeks v. Southern Bell (1969)

Ruled that women had a statutory right to choose, for themselves, whether to work in physically demanding jobs that were historically performed by men.

- Smith v. YMCA of Montgomery (1970)

Ordered the desegregation of the Montgomery chapter of the YMCA.

- Wyatt v. Stickney (1971)

Established a right to treatment for people with mental illness who have been involuntarily committed.

- NAACP v. Dothard (1974)

Required the state of Alabama to continue hiring (as ordered by the court in 1972) to overcome decades of racial discrimination in the Dept. of Public Safety, wherein the department should hire 50% blacks in state trooper and support positions until racial parity of 25% representation was achieved.

- Garcia-Mir v. Meese (1986)

Upheld that existing U.S. law superseded customary international law.

== In popular culture ==
- Johnson is played by Martin Sheen in the 2014 film Selma.

== See also ==
- List of United States federal judges by longevity of service

== Sources ==
- Bass, Jack (1992). Taming the Storm: The Life and Times of Judge Frank M. Johnson, Jr., and the South's Fight over Civil Rights. Doubleday. ISBN 0-385-41348-3.
- Garrow, David J. (April 2000). "Visionaries of the Law: John Minor Wisdom and Frank M. Johnson, Jr". Yale Law Journal. 109: 1219–36.
- Kennedy Jr., Robert F. (1978). Judge Frank M. Johnson, Jr: A biography. Putnam. ISBN 0-399-12123-4.
- Krotoszynski, Ronald J. Jr. (April 2000). "Equal Justice Under Law: The Jurisprudential Legacy of Judge Frank M. Johnson, Jr". Yale Law Journal. 109: 1237–51.
- Lewis, John (April 2000). "Reflections on Judge Frank M. Johnson, Jr". Yale Law Journal. 109: 1253–6.
- Marshall, Burke (April 2000). "In Remembrance of Judges Frank M. Johnson, Jr. and John Minor Wisdom". Yale Law Journal. 109: 1207–18.
- "Judge Johnson Buried in the Alabama Hills". The New York Times. July 28, 1999.
- Sikora, Frank (2007). The Judge: The Life and Opinions of Alabama's Frank M. Johnson, Jr. NewSouth Books. ISBN 978-1-58838-158-3.
- Thompson, Myron H. (April 2000). "Measuring a Life: Frank Minis Johnson, Jr". Yale Law Journal. 109: 1257–9.
- Yarbrough, Tinsley E. (1981). Judge Frank Johnson and Human Rights in Alabama. University of Alabama Press. ISBN 0-8173-0056-2.

Legal offices
Preceded by Charles Brents Kennamer	Judge of the United States District Court for the Middle District of Alabama; 1955–1979	Succeeded by Myron H. Thompson
New office	Chief Judge of the United States District Court for the Middle District of Alabama; 1966–1979	Succeeded by Robert Edward Varner
New seat	Judge of the United States Court of Appeals for the Fifth Circuit; 1979–1981	Seat abolished
New seat	Judge of the United States Court of Appeals for the Eleventh Circuit; 1981–1991	Succeeded by Edward Earl Carnes
