= George L. Beck Jr. =

American attorney

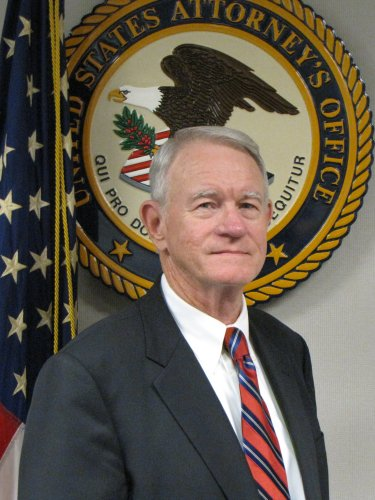

United States Attorney for the Middle District of Alabama
- In office July 6, 2011 – March 10, 2017
- President: Barack Obama; Donald Trump
- Preceded by: Leura Canary
- Succeeded by: Louis V. Franklin Sr.

Personal details
- Born: George Lamar Beck, Jr. September 11, 1941 (age 84) Geneva, Alabama, U.S.
- Party: Democratic

Military service
- Branch/service: United States Army
- Years of service: 1966-2001
- Rank: Colonel
- Unit: Alabama Army National Guard

George Lamar Beck Jr. (born September 11, 1941) is an American attorney who served as the United States Attorney for the Middle District of Alabama from 2011 to 2017. In March 2017, he joined the law firm of Morris, Haynes, Hornsby, Wheeles & Knowles.

== Biography ==
Beck graduated from Auburn University with a Bachelor of Arts degree in 1963 and from the University of Alabama School of Law with a Bachelor of Laws degree in 1966. Beck enlisted in the Alabama Army National Guard in 1966 and retired as a colonel in 2001.

=== Legal career ===
He worked as an associate at St. John & St. John from 1966 to 1971. Beck served as the Deputy Attorney General of Alabama from 1971 to 1979. He was a sole practitioner from 1986 to 2003 and from 1979 to 1982 and was a partner at Baxley, Beck, Dillard & Dauphin from 1982 to 1986. He has been a shareholder of Capell & Howard, P.C. since 2004.

=== United States Attorney ===
Beck was nominated by President Barack Obama to be United States Attorney for the Middle District of Alabama on March 31, 2011. On June 30, 2011, he was confirmed by the Senate by voice vote. On July 6, 2011, he was sworn in as United States Attorney. He resigned on March 10, 2017, after being order to by President Donald Trump as part of the 2017 dismissal of U.S. attorneys.

After resigning as U.S. Attorney, he joined the law firm of Morris, Haynes, Hornsby, Wheeles & Knowles which is based in Birmingham and Alexander City.

== See also ==
- 2017 dismissal of U.S. attorneys
