= Annie Donaldson =

American lawyer

Deputy White House Counsel
- In office February 2017 – December 2018
- President: Donald Trump

Personal details
- Born: Ann Michelle Donaldson Richmond, Kentucky, U.S.
- Party: Republican
- Spouse: Brett Talley
- Education: University of Alabama (BA); Harvard University (JD)
- Occupation: Lawyer

Annie Donaldson is an American lawyer. Donaldson joined the White House in February 2017, serving as Deputy Counsel to the President under Donald Trump. She left the position in December 2018. She is currently a partner in Luther Strange & Associates LLC.

Originally from Richmond, Kentucky, she graduated from Model Laboratory School, then attended the University of Alabama. When she graduated, she interned at the White House (during the George W. Bush administration). Donaldson later attended Harvard Law School, where she was a Supreme Court Chair for the Harvard Law Review, and executive editor for the Harvard Journal of Law and Public Policy. She completed her degree in 2011.

Donaldson became the campaign manager for the Massachusetts Republican Party in 2004, and then the senior operations coordinator for the Office of the Governor of Massachusetts from 2005 to 2007 under Mitt Romney. Donaldson then worked as assistant director of operations on Romney's campaign in 2008, then again in 2012 as associate counsel. Her husband, Brett Talley also worked for the Romney campaign in 2012, as a speech writer. Donaldson became an associate at the law firm Patton Boggs LLP from October 2011 to July 2014, and then an associate at Jones Day until joining the White House as Deputy Counsel to the President in February 2017.

Donaldson was interviewed by investigators from the team of special counsel Robert Mueller as part of the investigation into Russia's interference in the presidential election. With the complete release of the Mueller report, her detailed accounts of everyday life in the Trump White House are providing key supporting evidence in ongoing investigations. The House Judiciary Committee subpoenaed documents and her testimony on May 21, 2019. On June 4, 2019, the Trump White House invoked executive privilege, directing Donaldson to not provide any documents related to her employment in the Trump administration.

== See also ==
- Russian interference in the 2016 United States elections
