= Truman McGill Hobbs =

American judge

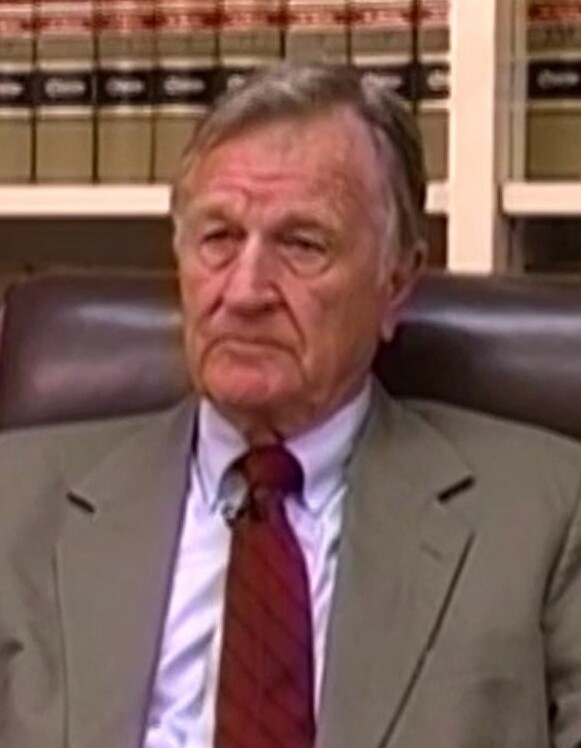

Senior Judge of the United States District Court for the Middle District of Alabama
- In office February 11, 1991 – November 4, 2015

Chief Judge of the United States District Court for the Middle District of Alabama
- In office 1984–1991
- Preceded by: Robert Edward Varner
- Succeeded by: Myron Herbert Thompson

Judge of the United States District Court for the Middle District of Alabama
- In office April 3, 1980 – February 11, 1991
- Appointed by: Jimmy Carter
- Preceded by: Seat established by 92 Stat. 1629
- Succeeded by: Ira De Ment

Personal details
- Born: February 8, 1921 Selma, Alabama
- Died: November 4, 2015 (aged 94) Montgomery, Alabama
- Education: University of North Carolina (AB); Yale Law School (LLB)

Truman McGill Hobbs Sr. (February 8, 1921 – November 4, 2015) was a United States district judge of the United States District Court for the Middle District of Alabama.

== Education and career ==
Born in Selma, Alabama, Hobbs received an Artium Baccalaureus degree from the University of North Carolina in 1942, and was a Lieutenant in the United States Navy during World War II, from 1942 to 1946. He received a Bachelor of Laws from Yale Law School in 1948, becoming a law clerk to Justice Hugo Black of the Supreme Court of the United States from 1948 to 1949. He was in private practice in Montgomery, Alabama, from 1949 to 1980, also serving as chairman of the Alabama Unemployment Appeal Board from 1952 to 1958.

== Federal judicial service ==
On January 23, 1980, Hobbs was nominated by President Jimmy Carter to a new seat on the United States District Court for the Middle District of Alabama created by 92 Stat. 1629. He was confirmed by the United States Senate on April 3, 1980, and received his commission the same day. He served as Chief Judge from 1984 to 1991, assuming senior status on February 11, 1991. He died on November 4, 2015, at his family home in Montgomery.

== See also ==
- List of law clerks for the first seat of the Supreme Court of the United States

== Sources ==
Legal offices
Preceded by Seat established by 92 Stat. 1629	Judge of the United States District Court for the Middle District of Alabama; 1980–1991	Succeeded by Ira De Ment
Preceded by Robert Edward Varner	Chief Judge of the United States District Court for the Middle District of Alabama; 1984–1991	Succeeded by Myron Herbert Thompson
