= Alabama Civil Rights & Civil Liberties Law Review =

- Discipline: Law review
- Language: English
- Edited by: Maya Stevenson

Publication details
- History: 2009-present
- Publisher: University of Alabama School of Law (United States)
- Frequency: Biannually

Standard abbreviations
- Bluebook: Ala. C.R. & C.L. L. Rev
- ISO 4: Ala. Civ. Rights Civ. Lib. Law Rev.

Indexing
- ISSN: 2160-9993

Links
- Journal homepage

The Alabama Civil Rights & Civil Liberties Law Review (ACRCL) is a student-run law review published by the University of Alabama School of Law. The journal is published two times per year and contains articles, essays, and book reviews concerning civil rights and liberties. It is the largest civil rights law review in the Deep South.

== History ==
The journal was established in 2008 to track developments in the vital and interconnected areas of civil rights and civil liberties. The inaugural issue featured student-written pieces by Karthik Subramanian and Alexander E. Vaughn—Karthik's on the Alabama anti-sex toys statute and Alexander's on the standards for plain view searches involving computers.

Reflecting on the history of the institution and its place in the narrative of the civil rights movement, their first issue posed a question: "Have we overcome?" This issue featured:

- "Associational Privacy and the First Amendment: NAACP v. Alabama, Privacy and Data Protection" by Anita L. Allen
- "Shall We Overcome? 'Post-Racialism' and Inclusion in the 21st Century" by Sheryll Cashin
- "Justice Clarence Thomas: The Burning of Civil Rights Bridges" by Judge U.W. Clemon and Stephanie Y. Moore
- "The Students at the University of Alabama in 1845 and the Families that Sent Them" by Royal Dumas
- "The Anti-Apartheid Principle in American Property Law" by Joseph Singer.

Symposia

Alabama Civil Rights & Civil Liberties Law Review has hosted two symposia.

- "Antidiscrimination Law and Policy After Hobby Lobby," was held on March 27, 2015, and hosted participating scholars Leslie C. Griffin, Paul Horwitz, Andrew M. Koppelman, Ira C. Lupu, and Elizabeth Sepper, along with David Dinielli, the Deputy Legal Director at Southern Poverty Law Center.
- "Redefining Clearly Established Rights after Ferguson: § 1983 Claims and Community Policing from Hope v. Pelzer to Kingsley v. Hendrickson" was held on April 1, 2016, in response to the highly publicized deaths of Michael Brown Jr., Freddie Gray, and Tamir Rice. Participating scholars were Bryan Adamson, Mary Fan, John Gross, and Song Richardson. A law enforcement community panel included Kira Fonteneau, Lyn Head, Praveen Krishna, Yuri Linetsky, and Steven D. Anderson, the city of Tuscaloosa chief of police.

Editors in Chief

- Maya Stevenson, Volume 15
- Blue Shellhorn, Volume 14
- Katrina Smith, Volume 13
- Grace Peach, Volume 11
- Joshua Polk, Volume 10
- Gonzalo E. Rodriguez, Volume 9
- Chris Saville, Volume 8
- Shalyn C. Smith, Volume 7
- Tiffany Ray, Volume 6
- David Lee Harris Jr., Volume 5
- Casey M. Bonner, Volume 4
- Kelley E. Joiner, Volume 3
- Karthik Subramanian, Volume 2
- Christina Robertson, Volume 1
