= Edward Earl Carnes =

American judge (born 1950)

Ed Carnes
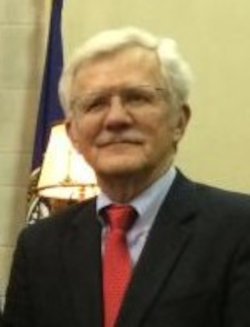

Senior Judge of the United States Court of Appeals for the Eleventh Circuit
- Incumbent
- Assumed office June 30, 2020

Chief Judge of the United States Court of Appeals for the Eleventh Circuit
- In office August 1, 2013 – June 2, 2020
- Preceded by: Joel Fredrick Dubina
- Succeeded by: William H. Pryor Jr.

Judge of the United States Court of Appeals for the Eleventh Circuit
- In office October 2, 1992 – June 30, 2020
- Appointed by: George H. W. Bush
- Preceded by: Frank Minis Johnson
- Succeeded by: Andrew L. Brasher

Personal details
- Born: Edward Earl Carnes; June 3, 1950 (age 75); Albertville, Alabama, U.S.
- Education: University of Alabama (BS); Harvard University (JD)

Edward Earl Carnes (born June 3, 1950) is an American judge who is a senior United States circuit judge of the United States Court of Appeals for the Eleventh Circuit.

== Education and legal career ==
Carnes received his Bachelor of Science degree from the University of Alabama in 1972. He received his Juris Doctor from Harvard Law School cum laude in 1975. After law school, he accepted a position as an assistant state attorney general for the state of Alabama, where he served from 1975 to 1992.

From 1981 to 1992 he served as the Chief of the Capital Punishment and Post-Conviction Litigation Division of the Alabama State Attorney General's Office. As the head of Alabama capital punishment unit, Carnes became, according to the National Law Journal, "the premier death penalty advocate in the country and a chief adviser on capital punishment to judges, the U.S. Justice Department and other prosecutors." Carnes re-wrote Alabama's death penalty statute, and defended its use before the Supreme Court of the United States on three occasions, including Beck v. Alabama, 447 U.S. 625.

Carnes's ascendancy to the bench created a hole in the capital punishment unit, leading an Alabama appellate judge to lament that the state had lost a "very effective voice in support of executions in this state."

== Federal judicial service ==
Carnes was nominated by President George H. W. Bush on January 27, 1992, for the United States Court of Appeals for the Eleventh Circuit to a seat vacated by Judge Frank Minis Johnson. To Carnes' opponents, he was a poor choice to succeed Judge Johnson, a hero of the civil rights movement who had declared that the segregated buses of Montgomery, Alabama were illegal. Some compared replacing Johnson with Carnes to Bush's earlier decision to replace Thurgood Marshall with Clarence Thomas. Nonetheless, his nomination might have sailed through the Senate if not for the Rodney King incident, which encouraged Senate Democrats to use Carnes' nomination as a chance to stump against racism in the criminal justice system.

Critics blasted Carnes for defending Alabama prosecutors accused of systematically excluding blacks from death penalty trial juries. Carnes' supporters responded that as a prosecutor, Carnes had engaged in a campaign to eliminate racial discrimination in jury selection even before the Supreme Court had become involved in the issue. They noted that when selected by the judges of the state to prosecute judicial misconduct, Carnes had sought sanctions against sixteen sitting judges, including two who were removed from the bench for racist remarks. He also sought a venue change to a county with a higher black population for the retrial of a twice-convicted black defendant accused of brutally murdering a white victim.

Prominent southern civil rights lawyers were split over the nomination. Stephen Bright, Director of the Southern Center for Human Rights, testified against the nomination and lambasted the Senate's decision to confirm Carnes. But Morris Dees, cofounder of the Southern Poverty Law Center and Carnes' frequent adversary, went door-to-door among Senate Democrats, fighting on behalf of Carnes. Both (Democratic) senators from Alabama supported his nomination, as did the attorneys general of each of the states comprising the Eleventh Circuit.

After eight months and a Democratic filibuster, Carnes was confirmed by the United States Senate on September 9, 1992, by a 62–36 vote. He received his commission the following day. He assumed office on October 2, 1992, and served as Chief Judge of the United States Court of Appeals for the Eleventh Circuit from August 1, 2013, to June 2, 2020. He assumed senior status on June 30, 2020.

Carnes is unrelated to Julie E. Carnes, with whom he serves on the Eleventh Circuit.

Legal offices
Preceded by Frank Minis Johnson	Judge of the United States Court of Appeals for the Eleventh Circuit; 1992–2020	Succeeded by Andrew L. Brasher
Preceded by Joel Fredrick Dubina	Chief Judge of the United States Court of Appeals for the Eleventh Circuit; 2013–2020	Succeeded by William H. Pryor Jr.
