= Charles Brents Kennamer =

American judge (1874–1955)

Judge of the United States District Court for the Middle District of Alabama
- In office February 25, 1931 – June 3, 1955
- Appointed by: Herbert Hoover
- Preceded by: Henry De Lamar Clayton Jr.
- Succeeded by: Frank Minis Johnson

Judge of the United States District Court for the Northern District of Alabama
- In office February 25, 1931 – June 5, 1936
- Appointed by: Herbert Hoover
- Preceded by: Henry De Lamar Clayton Jr.
- Succeeded by: Seat abolished

Personal details
- Born: Charles Brents Kennamer; November 25, 1874 Marshall County, Alabama
- Died: June 3, 1955 (aged 80)
- Education: Georgetown University read law

Charles Brents Kennamer (November 25, 1874 – June 3, 1955) was a United States district judge of the United States District Court for the Middle District of Alabama and the United States District Court for the Northern District of Alabama.

== Education and career ==
Born in Kennamer Cove, Marshall County, Alabama, Kennamer attended Georgetown University and read law to enter the bar in 1903. He entered private practice in Guntersville, Alabama in 1903. He was county solicitor for Marshall County from 1905 to 1906. He was an Assistant United States Attorney of the Northern District of Alabama from 1907 to 1914, and then a Special Assistant United States Attorney of the Northern District of Alabama from 1914 to 1916, finally becoming the United States Attorney for the Northern District of Alabama from 1922 to 1931.

== Federal judicial service ==
Kennamer was nominated by President Herbert Hoover on January 24, 1931, to a joint seat on the United States District Court for the Middle District of Alabama and the United States District Court for the Northern District of Alabama vacated by Judge Henry De Lamar Clayton Jr. He was confirmed by the United States Senate on February 20, 1931, and received his commission on February 25, 1931. He was reassigned by operation of law to serve only in the Middle District on June 5, 1936. His service terminated on June 3, 1955, due to his death.

== Sources ==
Legal offices
Preceded by Henry De Lamar Clayton Jr.	Judge of the United States District Court for the Middle District of Alabama; 1931–1955	Succeeded by Frank Minis Johnson
Preceded by Henry De Lamar Clayton Jr.	Judge of the United States District Court for the Northern District of Alabama; 1931–1936	Succeeded by Seat abolished
