= Mark Fuller (judge) =

American judge (born 1958)

Chief Judge of the United States District Court for the Middle District of Alabama
- In office 2004–2011
- Preceded by: Harold Albritton
- Succeeded by: William Keith Watkins

Judge of the United States District Court for the Middle District of Alabama
- In office November 26, 2002 – August 1, 2015
- Appointed by: George W. Bush
- Preceded by: Ira De Ment
- Succeeded by: Andrew L. Brasher

Personal details
- Born: Mark Everett Fuller; December 27, 1958 (age 67) Enterprise, Alabama, U.S.
- Party: Republican
- Spouse(s): Lisa Boyd (Divorced 2012); Kelli Gross (2012–2014)
- Education: University of Alabama (BS, JD)

Mark Everett Fuller (born December 27, 1958, Enterprise, Alabama) is a former United States district judge of the United States District Court for the Middle District of Alabama. Fuller is most recognizable for presiding over the controversial case of former Alabama Governor Don Siegelman. On August 1, 2015, he resigned following a federal court investigation into allegations about spousal abuse.

== Education and career ==
He received a Bachelor of Science degree from the University of Alabama in 1982 and a Juris Doctor from the University of Alabama School of Law in 1985. He was an attorney in private practice from 1985 to 1996, when he became Chief Assistant District Attorney for the 12th Judicial Circuit of Alabama.

In 1996, he was elected District Attorney of the 12th Circuit where he served until his appointment as a federal judge. As the District Attorney, Fuller was criticized for giving "extraordinary wages" to staff, including increasing office investigator Bruce DeVane's "salary to almost $6,000 every two weeks" until it nearly doubled by the end of 2000, and Fuller later testified during the proceedings about the retirements he approved in 2005.

On August 1, 2002, he was nominated by George W. Bush and confirmed by the United States Senate on November 14, 2002. He received his commission on November 26, 2002.

== U.S. v. Siegelman ==
In 2004, former Alabama Governor Don Siegelman was charged with Medicaid fraud, but the day after his trial began, prosecutors abruptly dropped all charges and judge U. W. Clemon threw out much of the prosecution's evidence and stated that no new charges could be refiled based on the disallowed evidence.

In 2006, Siegelman was charged again and Judge Fuller presided over the criminal trial for bribery and obstruction of justice. After a highly publicized trial that spanned several months, a jury convicted former Governor Siegelman and co-Defendant Richard Scrushy, founder and former CEO of HealthSouth, of federal funds bribery relating to Governor Siegelman's failed Alabama education lottery campaign. Prosecutors alleged that Scrushy, who supported Siegelman's 1998 gubernatorial opponent, Governor Fob James, reconciled their differences. Siegelman initially resisted, but later agreed to meet with Scrushy. According to trial testimony from a Siegelman aide, Nick Bailey, after the meeting ended Siegelman emerged with a $250,000 check and told Bailey that Scrushy "was halfway there." When Bailey asked Siegelman what Scrushy wanted for the contribution, Siegelman allegedly said, "the C-O-N Board." However, Bailey's statement was incorrect as evidence showed there was no meeting with Siegelman.

The jury was deadlocked twice. Fuller then told the jury they had the potential for "a lifetime job for you as a juror," noting that he had "a lifetime appointment" and was "a very patient person," and the jury convicted the following day. At his first sentencing hearing, Fuller sentenced him to 88 months. Siegelman defenders argue that the sentence is unprecedented and the punishment excessive because, for example, former Alabama Governor H. Guy Hunt, a Republican, was found guilty of personally pocketing $200,000 and did not receive jail time.

Siegelman appealed and on March 6, 2009, the United States Court of Appeals for the Eleventh Circuit upheld key bribery, conspiracy and obstruction counts against Siegelman and refused his request for a new trial, finding no evidence that the conviction was unjust, but struck two of the seven charges on which Siegelman was convicted and ordered a new sentencing hearing. It affirmed Judge Hinkle's decision (Judge Fuller asked that a separate judge be assigned to handle the motion) that Judge Fuller need not recuse himself from the case. The Eleventh Circuit noted that recusal motions must be made before trial, but the Defense did not learn of Fuller's conflicts (see "Criticism" below) until after the trial had begun. It also upheld the jury instructions that Fuller gave to the jury prior to their deliberations.

In December 2009, Fuller then reduced Governor Siegelman's sentence by 10 months during re-sentencing, leaving him with 69 months.

=== Criticism ===
Fuller was accused of acting unethically and criticized over his sentencing of former Alabama Governor Don Siegelman, allegedly saying in private that he would "hang Don Siegelman". He refused to allow the defense to present well-documented evidence of selective prosecution, and critics suggest he facilitated the prosecutorial misconduct that occurred in the case. Fuller was criticized for refusing to allow Siegelman to remain free on appeal and the Appeals Court overruled Fuller's decision. Siegelman argued that Fuller "gave the jury false instructions." On October 23, 2007, in a statement to the House Judiciary Committee, the Alliance for Justice called for an investigation into Fuller's handling of the case.

Scott Horton, a legal scholar, has written numerous articles about Fuller's multiple conflicts of interest in presiding over the Siegelman case in which Fuller refused to recuse himself from the case. One such conflict was that Siegelman, when Governor, prompted an investigation into Fuller's "questionable [financial] practices" as District Attorney. Fuller claimed that those allegations were "politically motivated", but audits proved that Fuller engaged in unethical financial practices. Siegelman supporters believe that Fuller held a grudge against Siegelman and would not recuse because he wanted Siegelman convicted, a feat accomplished with Fuller's expansive jury instructions and controversial dynamite charge.

At Siegelman's sentencing, Fuller had Siegelman taken from the courtroom in handcuffs and leg manacles and sent immediately to prison. 60 Minutes aired a report about the controversy during which Grant Woods, former Republican Attorney General of Arizona, commented, "That tells you that this was personal. You would not do that to a former governor."

== Investigation and resignation ==
On August 9, 2014, Fuller was arrested and charged with misdemeanor battery, punishable by up to a year in jail and a fine of up to $1,000, for an incident of domestic violence involving his second wife, Kelli, following her allegation that he was having an affair with a law-clerk employee. Fuller was jailed overnight following his arrest.

The Eleventh Circuit Court of Appeals reassigned cases in Fuller's court to other district court judges, and would not assign any new cases to Fuller until further order of the circuit court.

In September, he accepted a plea deal that would "expunge" the charges if he underwent a drug and alcohol evaluation, completed a counseling program, and attended a domestic violence program for 24 weeks.

The Judicial Conference of the United States began looking into the accusations against Fuller.

By September 2014, several state and national politicians called on Fuller to resign. Alabama Democrat Terri Sewell publicly stated Fuller should resign, and other members of Alabama's congressional delegation followed suit.

On September 17, 2014, Republican U.S. Senators Richard Shelby and Jeff Sessions of Alabama, and Democratic U.S. Senator Claire McCaskill of Missouri, called on Fuller to resign from the District Court.

On October 17, 2014, Sewell "threatened to begin impeachment proceedings" against Fuller if he did not resign.

On May 29, 2015, Fuller sent President Barack Obama a letter of resignation effective August 1, 2015.

In September 2015, a committee of federal judges who investigated Fuller told Congress it should consider impeaching Fuller despite his resignation, citing as justification its determination that Fuller had engaged in "reprehensible conduct" as there was "substantial evidence" that Fuller had physically abused his wife "at least eight times" and that Fuller "was also accused of committing perjury" when denying abusing his wife.

In addition, the report concluded Fuller made "false statements to the chief judge of the 11th Circuit in late December 2010 in a way that caused a massive disruption in the District Courts' operation and loss of public confidence in the court as an instrument of Justice."

== Personal life ==
Fuller has been married twice. In 2012, he divorced Lisa Boyd Fuller, and the court records were sealed with Mark citing safety concerns and Lisa objecting, alleging Fuller "was guilty of marital misconduct and is attempting to shield himself from the public scrutiny thereof."

That same year he married his second wife, Kelli, a former court bailiff, whom Lisa Fuller alleged had had an affair with her husband.

Legal offices
| Preceded by Ira De Ment | Judge of the United States District Court for the Middle District of Alabama; 2002–2015 | Succeeded by Andrew L. Brasher |
| Preceded by Harold Albritton | Chief Judge of the United States District Court for the Middle District of Alabama; 2004–2011 | Succeeded by William Keith Watkins |
