= Joel Fredrick Dubina =

American judge (born 1947)

Joel Dubina
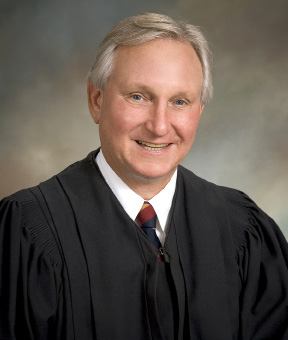

Senior Judge of the United States Court of Appeals for the Eleventh Circuit
- Incumbent
- Assumed office October 26, 2013

Chief Judge of the United States Court of Appeals for the Eleventh Circuit
- In office June 1, 2009 – July 31, 2013
- Preceded by: James Larry Edmondson
- Succeeded by: Edward Earl Carnes

Judge of the United States Court of Appeals for the Eleventh Circuit
- In office October 1, 1990 – October 26, 2013
- Appointed by: George H. W. Bush
- Preceded by: Robert Smith Vance
- Succeeded by: Kevin Newsom

Judge of the United States District Court for the Middle District of Alabama
- In office September 15, 1986 – October 5, 1990
- Appointed by: Ronald Reagan
- Preceded by: Robert Edward Varner
- Succeeded by: Harold Albritton

Personal details
- Born: Joel Fredrick Dubina; October 26, 1947 (age 77); Elkhart, Indiana, U.S.
- Children: Martha
- Education: University of Alabama (BS); Samford University (JD)

Joel Fredrick Dubina (born October 26, 1947) is an American attorney who is a Senior United States circuit judge of the United States Court of Appeals for the Eleventh Circuit and a former United States district judge of the United States District Court for the Middle District of Alabama.

== Early life and education ==
Dubina was born in Elkhart, Indiana. He received a Bachelor of Science degree from the University of Alabama in 1970, and a Juris Doctor from Cumberland School of Law at Samford University in 1973. He was a law clerk to Judge Robert Edward Varner of the United States District Court for the Middle District of Alabama from 1973 to 1974.

== Career ==
Dubina worked in private practice of law in Montgomery, Alabama from 1974 to 1983.

=== Federal judicial service ===
Dubina was a United States magistrate judge for the Middle District of Alabama from 1983 to 1986. He was nominated by President Ronald Reagan on July 30, 1986, to Varner's seat on the United States District Court for the Middle District of Alabama. He was confirmed by the United States Senate on September 12, 1986, and received commission on September 15, 1986. His service was terminated on October 5, 1990, following his elevation to the court of appeals.

Dubina was nominated to the United States Court of Appeals for the Eleventh Circuit by President George H. W. Bush on June 7, 1990, to a seat vacated by Judge Robert Smith Vance. Dubina was confirmed by the Senate on September 28, 1990, and received his commission on October 1, 1990. He served as Chief Judge of the Eleventh Circuit from June 1, 2009, until July 31, 2013. Dubina had announced his intention to assume senior status, effective August 1, 2013, but waited until his 66th birthday on October 24, 2013.

In 2009 Dubina served as member of the three-judge panel which denied an "Application for Leave to File a Second or Successive Habeas Corpus Petition" in the Troy Davis case.

Dubina was on the United States Court of Appeals for the Eleventh Circuit panel that reviewed Roger Vinson's decision in Florida v. United States Department of Health and Human Services.

== Personal life ==
Dubina is married. His daughter, Martha Roby, became an attorney and a politician, first serving on the city council. She entered politics and was elected in 2010 to the United States House of Representatives from Alabama (AL-2) defeating incumbent congressman Bobby Bright. She has been re-elected to successive terms.

Legal offices
| Preceded by Robert Edward Varner | Judge of the United States District Court for the Middle District of Alabama; 1986–1990 | Succeeded by Harold Albritton |
| Preceded by Robert Smith Vance | Judge of the United States Court of Appeals for the Eleventh Circuit; 1990–2013 | Succeeded by Kevin Newsom |
| Preceded by James Larry Edmondson | Chief Judge of the United States Court of Appeals for the Eleventh Circuit; 2009–2013 | Succeeded by Edward Earl Carnes |
