= United States District Court for the Middle District of Alabama =

United States federal district court in Alabama

- (M.D. Ala.)
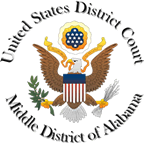

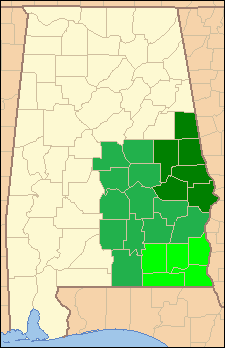
- Location: Frank M. Johnson Jr. Federal Building and U.S. Courthouse (Montgomery) More locations: United States Courthouse (Dothan); G.W. Andrews Federal Building and U.S. Courthouse (Opelika)
- Appeals to: Eleventh Circuit
- Established: February 6, 1839
- Judges: 3
- Chief Judge: R. Austin Huffaker Jr.

Officers of the court
- U.S. Attorney: Thomas Govan Jr.
- U.S. Marshal: Jesse Seroyer Jr.
- almd.uscourts.gov

The United States District Court for the Middle District of Alabama (in case citations, M.D. Ala.) is a United States district court in the Eleventh Circuit (except for patent claims and claims against the U.S. government under the Tucker Act, which are appealed to the Federal Circuit).

The District was established on February 6, 1839.

The United States Attorney's Office for the Middle District of Alabama represents the United States in civil and criminal litigation in the court. As of May 29, 2026 the United States attorney is Thomas Govan Jr..

== Organization of the court ==
The United States District Court for the Middle District of Alabama is one of three federal judicial districts in Alabama. Court for the District is held at Dothan, Montgomery, and Opelika.

Eastern Division comprises the following counties: Chambers, Lee, Macon, Randolph, Russell, and Tallapoosa.

Northern Division comprises the following counties: Autauga, Barbour, Bullock, Butler, Chilton, Coosa, Covington, Crenshaw, Elmore, Lowndes, Montgomery, and Pike.

Southern Division comprises the following counties: Coffee, Dale, Geneva, Henry, and Houston.

== Current judges ==
As of February 1, 2026:

#	Title	Judge	Duty station	Born	Term of service			Appointed by
#	Title	Judge	Duty station	Born	Active	Chief	Senior	Appointed by
22	Chief Judge	R. Austin Huffaker Jr.	Montgomery	1973	2019–present	2026–present	—	Trump
20	District Judge	Emily C. Marks	Montgomery	1973	2018–present	2019–2026	—	Trump
23	District Judge	Bill Lewis	Montgomery	1978	2025–present	—	—	Trump
14	Senior Judge	Myron H. Thompson	Montgomery	1947	1980–2013	1991–1998	2013–present	Carter
16	Senior Judge	Harold Albritton	Montgomery	1936	1991–2004	1998–2004	2004–present	G.H.W. Bush
19	Senior Judge	William Keith Watkins	Montgomery	1951	2005–2019	2011–2019	2019–present	G.W. Bush

== Former judges ==
#	Judge	Born–died	Active service	Chief Judge	Senior status	Appointed by	Reason for termination
1	William Crawford	1784–1849	1839–1849 (Note: Jointly appointed to the Middle, Northern, and Southern Districts of Alabama.)	—	—	J.Q. Adams/Operation of law	death
2	John Gayle	1792–1859	1849–1859	—	—	Taylor	death
3	William Giles Jones	1808–1883	1859–1861 (Note: Recess appointment; formally nominated on January 23, 1860, confirmed by the United States Senate on January 30, 1860, and received commission on January 30, 1860. Jointly appointed to the Middle, Northern, and Southern Districts of Alabama.)	—	—	Buchanan	resignation
4	George Washington Lane	1806–1863	1861–1863	—	—	Lincoln	death
5	Richard Busteed	1822–1898	1863–1874 (Note: Recess appointment; formally nominated on January 5, 1864, confirmed by the Senate on January 20, 1864, and received commission on January 20, 1864. Jointly appointed to the Middle, Northern, and Southern Districts of Alabama.)	—	—	Lincoln	resignation
6	John Bruce	1832–1901	1875–1901 (Note: Jointly appointed to the Middle and Northern Districts of Alabama. From 1875 to 1886, Judge Bruce was jointly appointed to the Southern District of Alabama.)	—	—	Grant	death
7	Thomas G. Jones	1844–1914	1901–1914 (Note: Recess appointment; formally nominated on December 5, 1901, confirmed by the Senate on December 17, 1901, and received commission the same day. Jointly appointed to the Middle and Northern Districts of Alabama.)	—	—	T. Roosevelt	death
8	Henry De Lamar Clayton Jr.	1857–1929	1914–1929 (Note: Jointly appointed to the Middle and Northern Districts of Alabama.)	—	—	Wilson	death
9	Charles Brents Kennamer	1874–1955	1931–1955 (Note: From 1931 to 1936, Judge Kennamer was jointly appointed to the Middle and Northern Districts of Alabama.)	—	—	Hoover	death
10	Frank Minis Johnson	1918–1999	1955–1979 (Note: Recess appointment; formally nominated on January 12, 1956, confirmed by the Senate on January 31, 1956, and received commission the same day.)	1966–1979	—	Eisenhower	elevation
11	Thomas Virgil Pittman	1916–2012	1966–1970 (Note: Judge Pittman was jointly appointed to the Middle and Southern Districts of Alabama.)	—	—	L. Johnson	reassignment
12	Robert Edward Varner	1921–2006	1971–1986	1979–1984	1986–2006	Nixon	death
13	Truman McGill Hobbs	1921–2015	1980–1991	1984–1991	1991–2015	Carter	death
15	Joel Fredrick Dubina	1947–present	1986–1990	—	—	Reagan	elevation
17	Ira De Ment	1931–2011	1992–2002	—	2002–2011	G.H.W. Bush	death
18	Mark Fuller	1958–present	2002–2015	2004–2011	—	G.W. Bush	resignation
21	Andrew L. Brasher	1981–present	2019–2020	—	—	Trump	elevation

== Chief judges ==
Chief judges have administrative responsibilities with respect to their district court. Unlike the Supreme Court, where one justice is specifically nominated to be chief, the office of chief judge rotates among the district court judges. To be chief, a judge must have been in active service on the court for at least one year, be under the age of 65, and have not previously served as chief judge.

A vacancy is filled by the judge highest in seniority among the group of qualified judges. The chief judge serves for a term of seven years, or until age 70, whichever occurs first. The age restrictions are waived if no members of the court would otherwise be qualified for the position.

When the office was created in 1948, the chief judge was the longest-serving judge who had not elected to retire, on what has since 1958 been known as senior status, or declined to serve as chief judge. After August 6, 1959, judges could not become or remain chief after turning 70 years old. The current rules have been in operation since October 1, 1982.

== Succession of seats ==
Seat 1
Seat reassigned concurrent with the Northern and Southern Districts on February 6, 1839 by 5 Stat. 315
Crawford	1839–1849
Gayle	1849–1859
Jones	1859–1861
Lane	1861–1863
Busteed	1864–1874
Concurrency with Southern District abolished on August 2, 1886 by 24 Stat. 213
Bruce	1875–1901
Jones	1901–1914
Clayton, Jr.	1914–1929
Concurrency with Northern District abolished on June 5, 1936 by 49 Stat. 1476
Kennamer	1931–1955
Johnson, Jr.	1955–1979
Thompson	1980–2013
Marks	2018–present

Seat 2
Seat established on March 18, 1966 by 80 Stat. 75 (concurrent with Southern District)
Pittman	1966–1970
Seat reassigned solely to Southern District on June 2, 1970 by 84 Stat. 294

Seat 3
Seat established on June 2, 1970 by 84 Stat. 294
Varner	1971–1986
Dubina	1986–1990
Albritton III	1991–2004
Watkins	2005–2019
Huffaker, Jr.	2019–present

Seat 4
Seat established on October 20, 1978 by 92 Stat. 1629
Hobbs	1980–1991
De Ment	1992–2002
Fuller	2002–2015
Brasher	2019–2020
Lewis, Jr.	2025–present

== Court decisions ==
Browder v. Gayle (1956) – Court rules that bus segregation in Montgomery was unconstitutional under the Fourteenth Amendment. Decision upheld by U.S. Supreme Court six months later.

Gomillion v. Lightfoot (1958) – Court dismissed action, which was later affirmed by the Fifth Circuit. In 1960, the U.S. Supreme Court reversed the decision, finding that electoral districts drawn in Tuskegee, with the purpose of disenfranchising black voters, violated the Fifteenth Amendment.

Lee v. Macon County Board of Education (1963) – Court rules segregation in schooling was unconstitutional under the Fourteenth and Fifteenth Amendment. Decision upheld by U.S. Supreme Court.

United States v. Alabama (1966) – Court rules poll tax violates the Fourteenth and Fifteenth Amendment. U.S. Supreme Court concurred three weeks later in an unrelated case, Harper v. Virginia Board of Elections.

Glassroth v. Moore (2002) – Court rules that a display of the Ten Commandments, erected by Alabama Chief Justice Roy Moore in the Alabama Judicial Building violated the Establishment Clause of the First Amendment.

== U.S. attorneys ==
Name	Term started	Term ended	Presidents served under
John A. Minnis	1870	1874	Ulysses S. Grant
N. S. McAfee	1874	1875	Ulysses S. Grant
Charles B. Mayer	1876	1880	Ulysses S. Grant; Rutherford B. Hayes
William Hugh Smith	1880	1885	Rutherford B. Hayes; James A. Garfield; Chester A. Arthur; Grover Cleveland
George H. Craig	1885	1885	Grover Cleveland
William H. Denson	1885	1889	Grover Cleveland; Benjamin Harrison
Lewis E. Parsons, Jr.	1889	1893	Benjamin Harrison; Grover Cleveland
Henry D. Clayton, Jr.	1893	1896	Grover Cleveland
George F. Moore, Jr.	1896	1897	Grover Cleveland; William McKinley
Warren S. Reese, Jr.	1897	1906	William McKinley; Theodore Roosevelt
Erastus J. Parsons	1906	1913	Theodore Roosevelt; William H. Taft; Woodrow Wilson
Thomas D. Samford	1913	1924	Woodrow Wilson; Warren G. Harding; Calvin Coolidge
Grady Reynolds	1924	1931	Calvin Coolidge; Herbert Hoover
Arthur B. Chilton	1931	1934	Herbert Hoover; Franklin D. Roosevelt
Thomas D. Samford	1934	1942	Franklin D. Roosevelt
Edward B. Parker	1942	1953	Franklin D. Roosevelt; Harry S. Truman; Dwight D. Eisenhower
Hartwell Davis	1953	1962	Dwight D. Eisenhower; John F. Kennedy
Ben Hardeman	1962	1969	John F. Kennedy; Lyndon B. Johnson; Richard Nixon
Leon J. Hopper	1969	1969	Richard Nixon
Ira De Ment	1969	1977	Richard Nixon; Gerald Ford; Jimmy Carter
Barry E. Teague	1977	1981	Jimmy Carter; Ronald Reagan
John C. Bell	1981	1987	Ronald Reagan
James E. Wilson	1987	1994	Ronald Reagan; George H. W. Bush; Bill Clinton
Charles R. Pitt	1994	2001	Bill Clinton; George W. Bush
Leura G. Canary	2001	2011	George W. Bush; Barack Obama
George L. Beck Jr.	2011	2017	Barack Obama; Donald Trump
A. Clark Morris	2017	2017	Donald Trump
Louis V. Franklin Sr.	2017	2021	Donald Trump
Sandra J. Stewart	2021	2023	Joe Biden
Jonathan S. Ross	2023	2026	Joe Biden; Donald Trump
Thomas R. Govan, Jr.	2026	Present	Donald Trump

== See also ==
- Courts of Alabama
- List of current United States district judges
- List of United States federal courthouses in Alabama
