= University of Alabama School of Law =

Public law school in Tuscaloosa, Alabama, US

- Parent school: University of Alabama
- Established: 1872
- School type: Public
- Dean: William S. Brewbaker III
- Location: Tuscaloosa, Alabama, U.S. 33.2039°N 87.5354°W
- Enrollment: 395 (2024-2025)
- Faculty: 46 full-time, 66 non-full-time
- USNWR ranking: 31st (tie) (2025)
- Bar pass rate: 95.24% (2025 First-time takers)
- Website: www.law.ua.edu
- ABA profile: ABA Standard 509 Report
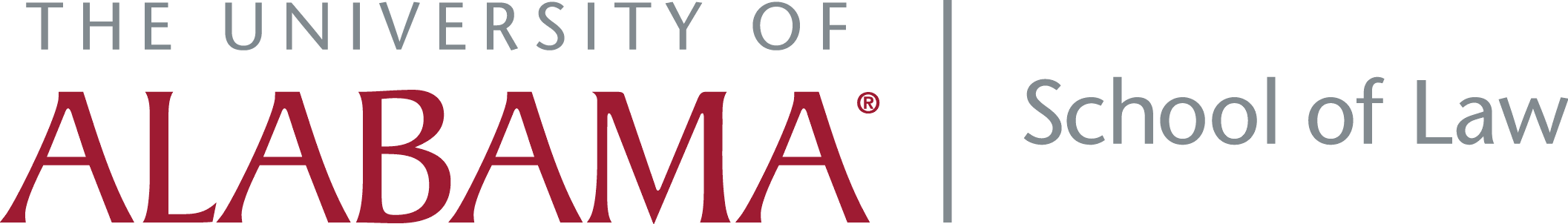

The University of Alabama School of Law, (formerly known as the Hugh F. Culverhouse Jr. School of Law at The University of Alabama) located in Tuscaloosa, Alabama, is the only public law school in the state. It is one of five law schools in the state, and one of three that are ABA accredited. According to Alabama's official 2025 ABA-required disclosures, 93.2% of the Class of 2025 obtained full-time, long-term, JD-required employment nine months after graduation. An additional 5.5% of the Class of 2025 obtained JD-advantage employment.

395 JD students attended Alabama Law during school year 2024–2025. 51 undergraduate institutions, 23 states, and 3 countries are represented among the class of 2026, and the student-faculty ratio is 6.7 to 1.

== Academics ==
Alabama Law offers the Juris Doctor (J.D.) degree, as well as an International LL.M., an LL.M. in Taxation, and an LL.M. in Business Transactions. In conjunction with the Manderson Graduate School of Business, the law school also offers a four-year joint J.D./M.B.A. program. Students may also pursue a number of graduate degrees through established dual enrollment programs for M.A. or Ph.D. in Political Science, M.P.A., Ph.D. in Economics, or LL.M. in Taxation. Certificates in Public Interest Law, Governmental Affairs, and International and Comparative Law are also available.

Admissions have been increasingly selective. The class of 2026 has a median LSAT score of 167 and median undergraduate GPA of 3.95. The 75th and 25th percentile for these metrics are 168 and 4.00, and 159 and 3.63, respectively.

=== Law clinics ===
Alabama Law guarantees that every interested student has the opportunity to participate in at least one law clinic before graduating. It is one of the few law schools in the country to make this guarantee.

- The Children's Rights Clinic works with the Alabama Disabilities Advocacy Program to assist youth with disabilities in the juvenile justice system.
- The Civil Law Clinic is Alabama's oldest clinic and provides free legal advice and representation to University of Alabama students and community members in civil matters. Civil clinic students handle over 200 cases annually.
- The Criminal Defense Law Clinic represents indigent defendants in misdemeanor and felony criminal matters for both bench and jury trials.
- The Domestic Violence Clinic takes a holistic approach to assisting survivors of domestic abuse in Tuscaloosa County, Alabama. In addition to providing comprehensive legal services, clinic students also perform outreach and education.
- The Entrepreneurship & Nonprofit Clinic provides free transactional legal services to small businesses, start-ups, and nonprofit organizations. The suite of services include preparation of formation documents, agreement negotiation and drafting, and regulatory compliance. The clinic is taking a hiatus for the 2026-2027 year, and may be permanently replaced by the Community Development Clinic.
- The Mediation Law Clinic provides an alternative to the adversarial litigation process for families to settle disputes more promptly and with a reduction in emotional trauma.
- The Appellate Advocacy Clinic provides free legal help in appeals involving civil matters, criminal cases, and issues with administrative agencies, allowing law students to take on real appeals from start to finish, including mediation, briefing and oral arguments in front of the Alabama courts of appeal and the Eleventh Circuit.

== Publications ==
In 2007 Jarvis & Coleman ranked the Alabama Law Review (ALR) 36th "on the basis of the prominence of their lead article authors." This represents an incredible 63 position improvement from the rankings of ten years prior. For 2015–2016, ExpressO, UC Berkeley's manuscript submission service, ranked the ALR at 10th in terms of "number of manuscripts received." In 2015 Washington and Lee's methods rank ALR at 46th in both the number of citations from other journals and the combined score. These show an improvement of 10 and 26 positions, respectively, over the preceding 5 years.

- Alabama Civil Rights & Civil Liberties Law Review
- Alabama Law Review
- Journal of the Legal Profession
- Law & Psychology Review

Approximately 40% of students graduate with journal experience. This is a slightly lower percentage than many of Alabama's peer schools, but nonetheless above the national average.

== Employment ==
According to Alabama's official 2025 ABA-required disclosures, 93.2% of the Class of 2025 obtained full-time, long-term, bar passage required employment within nine months after graduation. 29.7% of 2025 graduates were employed by a national law firm and 17.2% found judicial clerkships. Alabama's Law School Transparency under-employment score for 2023 is 4.9%, indicating the percentage of the Class of 2023 who were unemployed, pursuing an additional degree, or working in a non-professional, short-term, or part-time job nine months after graduation.

ABA Employment Summary for 2025 Graduates
Employment Status	Percentage
Employed - Bar Passage Required	93.2%
Employed - J.D. Advantage	5.5%
Employed - Professional Position	0.7%
Employed - Non-Professional Position	0.0%
Employed - Undeterminable	0.0%
Pursuing Graduate Degree Full Time	0.0%
Unemployed - Start Date Deferred	0.0%
Unemployed - Not Seeking	0.0%
Unemployed - Seeking	0.7%
Employment Status Unknown	0.0%
Total of 146 Graduates

== Costs ==
Tuition and fees at the University of Alabama School of Law for the 2025–2026 academic year total $24,980 for residents and $48,100 for nonresidents. 96% of students received grants during the 2024–2025 school year, of which 66% received at least half tuition.

== Alabama law alumni awards ==
Each year the Law School Board of Governors and the Alabama Law Alumni Society give out three awards. Specifically the three awards are The Sam W. Pipes Distinguished Alumna Award, Alabama Lawyer Hall of Honor Award, and Alabama Rising Young Attorney Award.

=== Alabama Lawyer Hall of Honor ===
The Alabama Lawyer Hall of Honor was established in 2020 by the Law School Foundation Board to honor alumni and faculty of the law school. The recipient of the Sam W. Pipes Distinguished Alumna Award is also inducted into the Alabama Lawyer Hall of Honor.

Inductees
Name	Year of Induction	Graduation Year from UA Law	Notes
Pamela Bucy Pierson	2025	N/A	
Jefferson B. Sessions III	2025	1973	
C.C. Bo Torbert	2025	1954	
H. Thomas "Tommy" Wells	2025	1975	
Judy Whalen Evans	2024	1975	
Vanessa Leonard	2024	1995	
Robert F. Prince	2024	1974	
M. Wayne Wheeler	2024	1966	
Sue Bell Cobb	2023	1981	
L. Scott Coogler	2023	1984	
Elizabeth H. Huntley	2023	1997	
M. Dale Marsh	2023	1974	
Sonja F. Bivins	2022	1988	
William N. Clark	2022	1971	
Michael D. Ermert	2022	1990	
H. Harold Stephens	2022	1980	
Julia Smeds Roth	2021	1977	
Bryan K. Fair	2021	N/A	
Walker Percy Badham III	2021	1982	

== Notable alumni ==
- John W. Abercrombie, United States Congressman from Alabama (1913–1917) and President of the University of Alabama (1902–1911)
- Edward B. Almon, United States Representative from Alabama (1915–1933)
- James B. Allen, United States Senator from Alabama (1969–1978)
- Mel Allen, sportscaster best known as the "Voice of the New York Yankees" and first host of This Week in Baseball
- George W. Andrews (Class of 1928), former U.S. Congressman for the 3rd District of Alabama
- Spencer Bachus, United States Congressman from Alabama's 6th Congressional District (1993–2015)
- Bill Baxley, former Attorney General and Lieutenant Governor of Alabama, and Civil Rights lawyer
- Samuel A. Beatty, Associate Justice of the Alabama Supreme Court (1976–1989)
- Robert H. Bennett, member of the Alabama House of Representatives (1942–1946)
- Tom Bevill (Class of 1948), former U.S. Congressman for the 4th District of Alabama
- Hugo Black, U.S. Representative and U.S. Senator for Alabama; Associate Justice of the Supreme Court, (1937–1971)
- Fred L. Blackmon (Class of 1894), former U.S. Congressman for the 4th District of Alabama
- Sydney J. Bowie (Class of 1885), former U.S. Congressman for the 4th District of Alabama
- Katie Britt, United States Senator from Alabama (2023–present)
- Henry De Lamar Clayton Jr. (L.L.B 1878) former U.S. Congressman for the 3rd District of Alabama and U.S. federal judge
- Charles J. Cooper (Class of 1978), clerk to Chief Justice William Rehnquist, U.S. Supreme Court, founder of law firm, Cooper & Kirk, in Washington, D.C.
- Emmett Ripley Cox, United States Court of Appeals for the Eleventh Circuit,
- Catherine Crosby, Miss Alabama 2003
- Morris Dees, Southern Poverty Law Center founder
- Paul DeMarco, Alabama Representative
- William L. Dickinson (Class of 1950) former U.S. Congressman for the 2nd District of Alabama
- Michael Figures (Class of 1972), one of the first three Black graduates of the law school, later served as president pro tempore of the Alabama Senate
- Mark Everett Fuller (J.D., in 1985), former United States district judge for the United States District Court for the Middle District of Alabama (forced resignation 2015)
- Millard Fuller, founder of Habitat for Humanity
- Victor Gold, journalist, political consultant, and author
- George M. Grant (Class of 1922) former U.S. Congressman for the 2nd District of Alabama
- Junius Foy Guin, Jr. (1947), former United States district judge for the United States District Court for the Northern District of Alabama
- Sam Hobbs (Class of 1908), former U.S. Congressman for the 4th District of Alabama
- Perry O. Hooper, Sr., 27th chief justice of the Alabama Supreme Court
- Frank Minis Johnson, United States Court of Appeals for the Eleventh Circuit
- Maud McLure Kelly, first woman to practice law in Alabama
- Claude R. Kirk, Jr., (Class of 1949) former governor of Florida
- Harper Lee, writer, attended the school for several years, but did not complete a degree (1930–2016)
- Roy Moore former Chief Justice, Supreme Court of Alabama; Republican nominee, U.S. Senate Alabama Special Election December 12, 2017
- Harold Mooty, District Judge for the United States District Court for the Northern District of Alabama
- Bert Nettles (Class of 1960), Republican member of the Alabama House of Representatives from 1969 to 1974 from Mobile; lawyer in Birmingham
- Shorty Price, perennial candidate for Governor of Alabama
- Kenneth A. Roberts (Class of 1935), former U.S. Congressman for the 4th District of Alabama
- Jeff Sessions, 84th United States Attorney General and former U.S. Senator from Alabama (1997–2017)
- Steadman S. Shealy, starting quarterback on Alabama's 1978 and 1979 national championship teams
- Henry B. Steagall (Class of 1893), former U.S. Congressman for the 3rd District of Alabama and Chairman of the U.S. House Committee on Banking and Currency
- Henry B. Steagall II, justice of the Supreme Court of Alabama
- Robert Smith Vance, United States Court of Appeals for the Eleventh Circuit
- David Vann (class of 1951), law clerk to Justice Hugo Black, U.S. Supreme Court, and mayor of Birmingham, Alabama
- George Wallace, former governor of Alabama
- Nick Wilson, public defender and reality show contestant
