= List of current United States district judges =

List of all current American federal and territorial district judges

The following is a list of all current judges of the United States district and territorial courts. The list includes both "active" and "senior" judges, both of whom hear and decide cases. There are 89 districts in the 50 states, with a total of 94 districts including four territories and the District of Columbia. Each of the 50 states has between one and four Article III district courts, and the District of Columbia and Puerto Rico each have one Article III district court. Article III judges have lifetime tenure.

The insular areas of Guam, the Northern Mariana Islands, and the United States Virgin Islands each have one Article IV territorial court. These courts are called "district courts" and exercise the same jurisdiction as district courts; however, Article IV territorial courts differ from Article III district courts in that territorial courts have judges who serve ten-year terms rather than lifetime tenures.

As of January 2025, Congress has authorized 677 permanent district judgeships, though the number of actual judges will be higher than 677 because of some judges electing senior status. Only active, non-senior-status judges may fill one of the 677 authorized judgeships. In addition, a small number of judges are concurrently appointed to more than one judgeship. While some judges with senior status are inactive, these judges are not yet retired and may return to actively hearing cases at any time. As of January 2025, there are 37 Article III district court vacancies with no nominations awaiting Senate action and no Article IV vacancies or nominees awaiting Senate action.

Map of the boundaries of the United States courts of appeals and United States district courts

== Middle District of Alabama ==
As of June 30, 2020:

#	Title	Judge	Duty station	Born	Term of service			Appointed by
#	Title	Judge	Duty station	Born	Active	Chief	Senior	Appointed by
20	Chief Judge	Emily C. Marks	Montgomery	1973	2018–present	2019–present	—	Trump
22	District Judge	R. Austin Huffaker Jr.	Montgomery	1973	2019–present	—	—	Trump
23	District Judge	vacant	—	—	—	—	—	—
14	Senior Judge	Myron H. Thompson	Montgomery	1947	1980–2013	1991–1998	2013–present	Carter
16	Senior Judge	Harold Albritton	Montgomery	1936	1991–2004	1998–2004	2004–present	G.H.W. Bush
19	Senior Judge	William Keith Watkins	Montgomery	1951	2005–2019	2011–2019	2019–present	G.W. Bush

== Northern District of Alabama ==
As of January 2, 2025:

#	Title	Judge	Duty station	Born	Term of service			Appointed by
#	Title	Judge	Duty station	Born	Active	Chief	Senior	Appointed by
34	Chief Judge	R. David Proctor	Birmingham	1960	2003–present	2024–present	—	G.W. Bush
37	District Judge	Madeline Haikala	Birmingham	1964	2013–present	—	—	Obama
38	District Judge	Annemarie Axon	Birmingham	1973	2018–present	—	—	Trump
39	District Judge	Liles C. Burke	Huntsville	1969	2018–present	—	—	Trump
40	District Judge	Corey L. Maze	Anniston	1978	2019–present	—	—	Trump
41	District Judge	Anna M. Manasco	Birmingham	1980	2020–present	—	—	Trump
42	District Judge	vacant	—	—	—	—	—	—
43	District Judge	vacant	—	—	—	—	—	—
28	Senior Judge	Sharon Lovelace Blackburn	Birmingham	1950	1991–2015	2006–2013	2015–present	G.H.W. Bush
29	Senior Judge	Charles Lynwood Smith Jr.	Huntsville	1943	1995–2013	—	2013–present	Clinton
30	Senior Judge	Inge Prytz Johnson	inactive	1945	1998–2012	—	2012–present	Clinton
32	Senior Judge	Karon O. Bowdre	inactive	1955	2001–2020	2013–2019	2020–present	G.W. Bush
35	Senior Judge	Virginia Emerson Hopkins	inactive	1952	2004–2018	—	2018–present	G.W. Bush

== Southern District of Alabama ==
As of October 1, 2021:

#	Title	Judge	Duty station	Born	Term of service			Appointed by
#	Title	Judge	Duty station	Born	Active	Chief	Senior	Appointed by
21	Chief Judge	Jeff Beaverstock	Mobile	1968	2018–present	2021–present	—	Trump
20	District Judge	Kristi DuBose	Mobile	1964	2005–present	2017–2021	—	G.W. Bush
22	District Judge	Terry F. Moorer	Mobile	1961	2018–present	—	—	Trump
16	Senior Judge	Charles R. Butler Jr.	Mobile	1940	1988–2005	1994–2003	2005–present	Reagan
18	Senior Judge	Callie V. Granade	Mobile	1950	2002–2016	2003–2010	2016–present	G.W. Bush
19	Senior Judge	William H. Steele	Mobile	1951	2003–2017	2010–2017	2017–present	G.W. Bush

== District of Alaska ==
As of July 8, 2024:

#	Title	Judge	Duty station	Born	Term of service			Appointed by
#	Title	Judge	Duty station	Born	Active	Chief	Senior	Appointed by
11	Chief Judge	Sharon L. Gleason	Anchorage	1957	2012–present	2022–present	—	Obama
13	District Judge	vacant	—	—	—	—	—	—
14	District Judge	vacant	—	—	—	—	—	—
5	Senior Judge	H. Russel Holland	Anchorage	1936	1984–2001	1989–1995	2001–present	Reagan
7	Senior Judge	James K. Singleton	inactive	1939	1990–2005	1995–2002	2005–present	G.H.W. Bush
8	Senior Judge	John W. Sedwick	Anchorage	1946	1992–2011	2002–2009	2011–present	G.H.W. Bush
9	Senior Judge	Ralph Beistline	Anchorage	1948	2002–2015	2009–2015	2015–present	G.W. Bush
10	Senior Judge	Timothy M. Burgess	Anchorage	1956	2006–2021	2015–2021	2021–present	G.W. Bush

== District of Arizona ==
As of January 7, 2025:

#	Title	Judge	Duty station	Born	Term of service			Appointed by
#	Title	Judge	Duty station	Born	Active	Chief	Senior	Appointed by
37	Chief Judge	Jennifer Zipps	Tucson	1964	2011–present	2024–present	—	Obama
38	District Judge	John J. Tuchi	Phoenix	1964	2014–present	—	—	Obama
39	District Judge	Diane Humetewa	Phoenix	1964	2014–present	—	—	Obama
40	District Judge	Steven Paul Logan	Phoenix	1965	2014–present	—	—	Obama
41	District Judge	Rosemary Márquez	Tucson	1968	2014–present	—	—	Obama
44	District Judge	Dominic W. Lanza	Phoenix	1976	2018–present	—	—	Trump
45	District Judge	Susan Brnovich	Phoenix	1968	2018–present	—	—	Trump
46	District Judge	Michael T. Liburdi	Phoenix	1977	2019–present	—	—	Trump
47	District Judge	Scott H. Rash	Tucson	1963	2020–present	—	—	Trump
48	District Judge	John C. Hinderaker	Tucson	1968	2020–present	—	—	Trump
49	District Judge	Krissa M. Lanham	Phoenix	1980	2024–present	—	—	Biden
50	District Judge	Angela M. Martinez	Tucson	1972	2024–present	—	—	Biden
51	District Judge	Sharad H. Desai	Phoenix	1981	2025–present	—	—	Biden
23	Senior Judge	Stephen M. McNamee	Phoenix	1942	1990–2007	1999–2006	2007–present	G.H.W. Bush
25	Senior Judge	Roslyn O. Silver	Phoenix	1946	1994–2013	2011–2013	2013–present	Clinton
26	Senior Judge	Frank R. Zapata	Tucson	1944	1996–2010	—	2010–present	Clinton
27	Senior Judge	Raner Collins	Tucson	1952	1998–2019	2013–2018	2019–present	Clinton
28	Senior Judge	Susan R. Bolton	Phoenix	1951	2000–2016	—	2016–present	Clinton
30	Senior Judge	James A. Teilborg	Phoenix	1942	2000–2013	—	2013–present	Clinton
31	Senior Judge	Frederick J. Martone	Phoenix	1943	2001–2013	—	2013–present	G.W. Bush
32	Senior Judge	Cindy K. Jorgenson	Tucson	1953	2002–2018	—	2018–present	G.W. Bush
33	Senior Judge	David C. Bury	Tucson	1942	2002–2012	—	2012–present	G.W. Bush
34	Senior Judge	David G. Campbell	Phoenix	1952	2003–2018	—	2018–present	G.W. Bush
35	Senior Judge	Neil V. Wake	Phoenix	1948	2004–2016	—	2016–present	G.W. Bush
36	Senior Judge	G. Murray Snow	Phoenix	1959	2008–2024	2018–2024	2024–present	G.W. Bush
42	Senior Judge	Douglas L. Rayes	Phoenix	1952	2014–2024	—	2024–present	Obama
43	Senior Judge	James A. Soto	Tucson	1950	2014–2024	—	2024–present	Obama

== Eastern District of Arkansas ==
As of December 18, 2023:

#	Title	Judge	Duty station	Born	Term of service			Appointed by
#	Title	Judge	Duty station	Born	Active	Chief	Senior	Appointed by
25	Chief Judge	Kristine Baker	Little Rock	1971	2012–present	2023–present	—	Obama
23	District Judge	Brian S. Miller	Little Rock	1967	2008–present	2012–2019	—	G.W. Bush
24	District Judge	D. Price Marshall Jr.	Little Rock	1963	2010–present	2019–2023	—	Obama
26	District Judge	James M. Moody Jr.	Little Rock	1964	2014–present	—	—	Obama
27	District Judge	Lee Rudofsky	Little Rock	1979	2019–present	—	—	Trump
19	Senior Judge	Susan Webber Wright	Little Rock	1948	1990–2013 (Note: In 1990, Judge Wright was jointly appointed to the Eastern and Western Districts of Arkansas.)	1998–2005	2013–present	G.H.W. Bush
20	Senior Judge	Billy Roy Wilson (Note: Appointed as William Roy Wilson Jr.; name changed in 2011.)	Little Rock	1939	1993–2008	—	2008–present	Clinton

== Western District of Arkansas ==
As of November 10, 2021:

#	Title	Judge	Duty station	Born	Term of service			Appointed by
#	Title	Judge	Duty station	Born	Active	Chief	Senior	Appointed by
24	Chief Judge	Susan O. Hickey	El Dorado	1955	2011–present	2019–present	—	Obama
25	District Judge	Timothy L. Brooks	Fayetteville	1964	2014–present	—	—	Obama
26	District Judge	vacant	—	—	—	—	—	—
20	Senior Judge	Jimm Larry Hendren	inactive	1940	1992–2012	1997–2012	2012–present	G.H.W. Bush
22	Senior Judge	Robert T. Dawson	inactive	1938	1998–2009	—	2009–present	Clinton
23	Senior Judge	Paul K. Holmes III	inactive	1951	2011–2021	2012–2019	2021–present	Obama

== Central District of California ==
As of June 1, 2025:

#	Title	Judge	Duty station	Born	Term of service			Appointed by
#	Title	Judge	Duty station	Born	Active	Chief	Senior	Appointed by
76	Chief Judge	Dolly Gee	Los Angeles	1959	2010–present	2024–present	—	Obama
37	District Judge	Stephen Victor Wilson	Los Angeles	1941	1985–present	—	—	Reagan
56	District Judge	David O. Carter	Santa Ana	1944	1998–present	—	—	Clinton
61	District Judge	Percy Anderson	Los Angeles	1948	2002–present	—	—	G.W. Bush
62	District Judge	John F. Walter	Los Angeles	1944	2002–present	—	—	G.W. Bush
63	District Judge	R. Gary Klausner	Los Angeles	1941	2002–present	—	—	G.W. Bush
73	District Judge	Otis D. Wright II	Los Angeles	1944	2007–present	—	—	G.W. Bush
77	District Judge	Josephine Staton	Los Angeles	1961	2010–present	—	—	Obama
79	District Judge	Michael W. Fitzgerald	Los Angeles	1959	2012–present	—	—	Obama
80	District Judge	Jesus Bernal	Riverside	1963	2012–present	—	—	Obama
81	District Judge	Fernando M. Olguin	Los Angeles	1961	2013–present	—	—	Obama
83	District Judge	André Birotte Jr.	Los Angeles	1966	2014–present	—	—	Obama
84	District Judge	Stanley Blumenfeld	Los Angeles	1962	2020–present	—	—	Trump
85	District Judge	John W. Holcomb	Santa Ana	1963	2020–present	—	—	Trump
86	District Judge	Mark C. Scarsi	Los Angeles	1964	2020–present	—	—	Trump
87	District Judge	Fernando Aenlle-Rocha	Los Angeles	1961	2020–present	—	—	Trump
88	District Judge	Maame Ewusi-Mensah Frimpong	Los Angeles	1976	2022–present	—	—	Biden
89	District Judge	Fred W. Slaughter	Santa Ana	1973	2022–present	—	—	Biden
90	District Judge	Sunshine Sykes	Riverside	1974	2022–present	—	—	Biden
91	District Judge	Sherilyn Peace Garnett	Los Angeles	1969	2022–present	—	—	Biden
92	District Judge	Wesley Hsu	Los Angeles	1971	2023–present	—	—	Biden
93	District Judge	Hernán D. Vera	Los Angeles	1970	2023–present	—	—	Biden
94	District Judge	Kenly Kiya Kato	Riverside	1972	2023–present	—	—	Biden
95	District Judge	Mónica Ramírez Almadani	Santa Ana	1979	2023–present	—	—	Biden
96	District Judge	Michelle Williams Court	Los Angeles	1966	2024–present	—	—	Biden
97	District Judge	Anne Hwang	Los Angeles	1975	2024–present	—	—	Biden
98	District Judge	Cynthia Valenzuela Dixon	Los Angeles	1969	2024–present	—	—	Biden
99	District Judge	Serena Murillo	Los Angeles	1970	2025–present	—	—	Biden
23	Senior Judge	Terry J. Hatter Jr.	Los Angeles	1933	1979–2005	1998–2001	2005–present	Carter
26	Senior Judge	Consuelo Bland Marshall	Los Angeles	1936	1980–2005	2001–2005	2005–present	Carter
35	Senior Judge	William Duffy Keller	Los Angeles	1934	1984–1999	—	1999–present	Reagan
52	Senior Judge	Christina A. Snyder	Los Angeles	1947	1997–2016	—	2016–present	Clinton
60	Senior Judge	Virginia A. Phillips	inactive	1957	1999–2022	2016–2020	2022–present	Clinton
65	Senior Judge	James V. Selna	Santa Ana	1945	2003–2020	—	2020–present	G.W. Bush
66	Senior Judge	Cormac J. Carney	inactive	1959	2003–2024	2020	2024–present	G.W. Bush
67	Senior Judge	Dale S. Fischer	Los Angeles	1951	2003–2024	—	2024–present	G.W. Bush
71	Senior Judge	Valerie Baker Fairbank	Los Angeles	1949	2007–2012	—	2012–present	G.W. Bush
74	Senior Judge	George H. Wu	Los Angeles	1950	2007–2023	—	2023–present	G.W. Bush
78	Senior Judge	John Kronstadt	Los Angeles	1951	2011–2022	—	2022–present	Obama

== Eastern District of California ==
As of October 4, 2024:

#	Title	Judge	Duty station	Born	Term of service			Appointed by
#	Title	Judge	Duty station	Born	Active	Chief	Senior	Appointed by
21	Chief Judge	Troy L. Nunley	Sacramento	1964	2013–present	2024–present	—	Obama
22	District Judge	Dale A. Drozd	Sacramento	1955	2015–present	—	—	Obama
23	District Judge	Jennifer L. Thurston	Fresno	1967	2021–present	—	—	Biden
25	District Judge	Daniel Calabretta	Sacramento	1978	2023–present	—	—	Biden
26	District Judge	Kirk E. Sherriff	Fresno	1968	2024–present	—	—	Biden
27	District Judge	Dena M. Coggins	Sacramento	1979	2024–present	—	—	Biden
11	Senior Judge	William B. Shubb	Sacramento	1938	1990–2004	1996–2003	2004–present	G.H.W. Bush
14	Senior Judge	Garland E. Burrell Jr.	inactive	1947	1992–2012	2007–2008	2012–present	G.H.W. Bush
15	Senior Judge	Anthony W. Ishii	inactive	1946	1997–2012	2008–2012	2012–present	Clinton
18	Senior Judge	Lawrence Joseph O'Neill	inactive	1952	2007–2020	2016–2019	2020–present	G.W. Bush
19	Senior Judge	John Mendez	Sacramento	1955	2008–2022	—	2022–present	G.W. Bush
20	Senior Judge	Kimberly J. Mueller	Sacramento	1957	2010–2024	2020–2024	2024–present	Obama

== Northern District of California ==
As of December 19, 2024:

#	Title	Judge	Duty station	Born	Term of service			Appointed by
#	Title	Judge	Duty station	Born	Active	Chief	Senior	Appointed by
59	Chief Judge	Richard Seeborg	San Francisco	1956	2010–present	2021–present	—	Obama
63	District Judge	Yvonne Gonzalez Rogers	Oakland	1965	2011–present	—	—	Obama
64	District Judge	Jon S. Tigar	Oakland	1962	2013–present	—	—	Obama
66	District Judge	James Donato	San Francisco	1960	2014–present	—	—	Obama
67	District Judge	Beth Labson Freeman	San Jose	1953	2014–present	—	—	Obama
68	District Judge	Vince Chhabria	San Francisco	1969	2014–present	—	—	Obama
69	District Judge	Haywood Gilliam	Oakland	1969	2014–present	—	—	Obama
70	District Judge	Jacqueline Scott Corley	San Francisco	1966	2022–present	—	—	Biden
71	District Judge	Trina Thompson	San Francisco	1961	2022–present	—	—	Biden
72	District Judge	Araceli Martínez-Olguín	San Francisco	1977	2023–present	—	—	Biden
73	District Judge	P. Casey Pitts	San Jose	1980	2023–present	—	—	Biden
74	District Judge	Rita F. Lin	San Francisco	1978	2023–present	—	—	Biden
75	District Judge	Eumi K. Lee	San Jose	1972	2024–present	—	—	Biden
76	District Judge	Noël Wise	San Jose	1968	2024–present	—	—	Biden
38	Senior Judge	Thelton Henderson	inactive	1933	1980–1998	1990–1997	1998–present	Carter
47	Senior Judge	Saundra Brown Armstrong	inactive	1947	1991–2012	—	2012–present	G.H.W. Bush
50	Senior Judge	Claudia Ann Wilken	Oakland	1949	1993–2014	2012–2014	2014–present	Clinton
51	Senior Judge	Maxine M. Chesney	San Francisco	1942	1995–2009	—	2009–present	Clinton
52	Senior Judge	Susan Illston	San Francisco	1948	1995–2013	—	2013–present	Clinton
53	Senior Judge	Charles Breyer	San Francisco	1941	1997–2011	—	2011–present	Clinton
56	Senior Judge	William Alsup	San Francisco	1945	1999–2021	—	2021–present	Clinton
57	Senior Judge	Phyllis J. Hamilton	Oakland	1952	2000–2021	2014–2021	2021–present	Clinton
58	Senior Judge	Jeffrey White	Oakland	1945	2002–2021	—	2021–present	G.W. Bush
61	Senior Judge	Edward Davila	San Jose	1952	2011–2024	—	2024–present	Obama
62	Senior Judge	Edward M. Chen	San Francisco	1953	2011–2022	—	2022–present	Obama
65	Senior Judge	William Orrick III	San Francisco	1953	2013–2023	—	2023–present	Obama

== Southern District of California ==
As of January 22, 2025:

#	Title	Judge	Duty station	Born	Term of service			Appointed by
#	Title	Judge	Duty station	Born	Active	Chief	Senior	Appointed by
67	Chief Judge	Cynthia Bashant	San Diego	1960	2014–present	2025–present	—	Obama
58	District Judge	Dana Sabraw	San Diego	1958	2003–present	2021–2025	—	G.W. Bush
62	District Judge	Janis Lynn Sammartino	San Diego	1950	2007–present	—	—	G.W. Bush
65	District Judge	Cathy Ann Bencivengo	San Diego	1958	2012–present	—	—	Obama
68	District Judge	Todd W. Robinson	San Diego	1967	2020–present	—	—	Trump
69	District Judge	Linda Lopez	San Diego	1968	2021–present	—	—	Biden
70	District Judge	Jinsook Ohta	San Diego	1976	2021–present	—	—	Biden
71	District Judge	Ruth Bermudez Montenegro	San Diego	1967	2022–present	—	—	Biden
72	District Judge	Robert S. Huie	San Diego	1976	2022–present	—	—	Biden
73	District Judge	Andrew G. Schopler	San Diego	1971	2023–present (Note: By virtue of his seniority of age, Judge Schopler holds seniority over Judge Simmons despite their identical commission dates.)	—	—	Biden
74	District Judge	James E. Simmons Jr.	San Diego	1979	2023–present	—	—	Biden
75	District Judge	Benjamin J. Cheeks	San Diego	1977	2025–present	—	—	Biden
76	District Judge	vacant	—	—	—	—	—	—
50	Senior Judge	Marilyn L. Huff	San Diego	1951	1991–2016	1998–2005	2016–present	G.H.W. Bush
53	Senior Judge	Barry Ted Moskowitz	San Diego	1950	1995–2019	2012–2019	2019–present	Clinton
54	Senior Judge	Jeffrey T. Miller	San Diego	1943	1997–2010	—	2010–present	Clinton
55	Senior Judge	Thomas J. Whelan	San Diego	1940	1998–2010	—	2010–present	Clinton
56	Senior Judge	M. James Lorenz	San Diego	1935	1999–2009	—	2009–present	Clinton
59	Senior Judge	William Q. Hayes	San Diego	1956	2003–2021	—	2021–present	G.W. Bush
60	Senior Judge	John A. Houston	San Diego	1952	2003–2018	—	2018–present	G.W. Bush
61	Senior Judge	Roger Benitez	San Diego	1950	2004–2017	—	2017–present	G.W. Bush
63	Senior Judge	Michael Anello	San Diego	1943	2008–2018	—	2018–present	G.W. Bush
64	Senior Judge	Anthony J. Battaglia	San Diego	1949	2011–2021	—	2021–present	Obama
66	Senior Judge	Gonzalo P. Curiel	San Diego	1953	2012–2023	—	2023–present	Obama

== District of Colorado ==
As of January 12, 2024:

#	Title	Judge	Duty station	Born	Term of service			Appointed by
#	Title	Judge	Duty station	Born	Active	Chief	Senior	Appointed by
24	Chief Judge	Philip A. Brimmer	Denver	1959	2008–present	2019–present	—	G.W. Bush
29	District Judge	Daniel D. Domenico	Denver	1972	2019–present	—	—	Trump
30	District Judge	Regina M. Rodriguez	Denver	1963	2021–present	—	—	Biden
31	District Judge	Charlotte Sweeney	Denver	1969	2022–present	—	—	Biden
32	District Judge	Nina Y. Wang	Denver	1972	2022–present	—	—	Biden
33	District Judge	Gordon Gallagher	Grand Junction	1970	2023–present	—	—	Biden
34	District Judge	Kato Crews	Denver	1975	2024–present	—	—	Biden
12	Senior Judge	John L. Kane Jr.	Denver	1937	1977–1988	—	1988–present	Carter
16	Senior Judge	Lewis Babcock	Denver	1943	1988–2008	2000–2007	2008–present	Reagan
21	Senior Judge	Marcia S. Krieger	Denver	1954	2002–2019	2013–2019	2019–present	G.W. Bush
22	Senior Judge	Robert E. Blackburn	Denver	1950	2002–2016	—	2016–present	G.W. Bush
25	Senior Judge	Christine Arguello	Denver	1955	2008–2022	—	2022–present	G.W. Bush
26	Senior Judge	William J. Martínez	Denver	1954	2010–2023	—	2023–present	Obama
27	Senior Judge	R. Brooke Jackson	Denver	1947	2011–2021	—	2021–present	Obama
28	Senior Judge	Raymond P. Moore	Denver	1953	2013–2023	—	2023–present	Obama

== District of Columbia ==
As of January 2, 2025:

#	Title	Judge	Duty station	Born	Term of service			Appointed by
#	Title	Judge	Duty station	Born	Active	Chief	Senior	Appointed by
98	Chief Judge	James Boasberg	Washington, D.C.	1963	2011–present	2023–present	—	Obama
100	District Judge	Rudolph Contreras	Washington, D.C.	1962	2012–present	—	—	Obama
102	District Judge	Christopher R. Cooper	Washington, D.C.	1966	2014–present	—	—	Obama
103	District Judge	Tanya Chutkan	Washington, D.C.	1962	2014–present	—	—	Obama
104	District Judge	Randolph Moss	Washington, D.C.	1961	2014–present	—	—	Obama
105	District Judge	Amit Mehta	Washington, D.C.	1971	2014–present	—	—	Obama
106	District Judge	Timothy J. Kelly	Washington, D.C.	1969	2017–present	—	—	Trump
107	District Judge	Trevor N. McFadden	Washington, D.C.	1978	2017–present	—	—	Trump
108	District Judge	Dabney Friedrich	Washington, D.C.	1967	2017–present	—	—	Trump
109	District Judge	Carl J. Nichols	Washington, D.C.	1970	2019–present	—	—	Trump
111	District Judge	Jia M. Cobb	Washington, D.C.	1980	2021–present	—	—	Biden
112	District Judge	Ana C. Reyes	Washington, D.C.	1974	2023–present	—	—	Biden
113	District Judge	Loren AliKhan	Washington, D.C.	1983	2023–present	—	—	Biden
114	District Judge	Amir Ali	Washington, D.C.	1985	2024–present	—	—	Biden
115	District Judge	Sparkle L. Sooknanan	Washington, D.C.	1983	2025–present	—	—	Biden
77	Senior Judge	Thomas F. Hogan	inactive	1938	1982–2008	2001–2008	2008–present	Reagan
81	Senior Judge	Royce Lamberth	Washington, D.C. San Antonio, Texas (Note: Judge Lamberth has sat with the Western District of Texas for several months each year since 2015.)	1943	1987–2013	2008–2013	2013–present	Reagan
83	Senior Judge	Paul L. Friedman	Washington, D.C.	1944	1994–2009	—	2009–present	Clinton
85	Senior Judge	Emmet G. Sullivan	Washington, D.C.	1947	1994–2021	—	2021–present	Clinton
88	Senior Judge	Colleen Kollar-Kotelly	Washington, D.C.	1943	1997–2023	—	2023–present	Clinton
89	Senior Judge	Henry H. Kennedy Jr.	inactive	1948	1997–2011	—	2011–present	Clinton
90	Senior Judge	Richard W. Roberts	inactive	1953	1998–2016	2013–2016	2016–present	Clinton
91	Senior Judge	Ellen Segal Huvelle	inactive	1948	1999–2014	—	2014–present	Clinton
92	Senior Judge	Reggie Walton	Washington, D.C.	1949	2001–2015	—	2015–present	G.W. Bush
93	Senior Judge	John D. Bates	Washington, D.C.	1946	2001–2014	—	2014–present	G.W. Bush
94	Senior Judge	Richard J. Leon	Washington, D.C.	1949	2002–2016	—	2016–present	G.W. Bush
95	Senior Judge	Rosemary M. Collyer	inactive	1945	2002–2016	—	2016–present	G.W. Bush
96	Senior Judge	Beryl Howell	Washington, D.C.	1956	2010–2024	2016–2023	2024–present	Obama
99	Senior Judge	Amy Berman Jackson	Washington, D.C.	1954	2011–2023	—	2023–present	Obama

== District of Connecticut ==
As of February 18, 2025:

#	Title	Judge	Duty station	Born	Term of service			Appointed by
#	Title	Judge	Duty station	Born	Active	Chief	Senior	Appointed by
36	Chief Judge	Michael P. Shea	Hartford	1967	2012–present	2022–present	—	Obama
38	District Judge	Victor Allen Bolden	New Haven	1965	2014–present	—	—	Obama
39	District Judge	Kari A. Dooley	Bridgeport	1963	2018–present	—	—	Trump
41	District Judge	Sarala Nagala	Hartford	1983	2021–present	—	—	Biden
42	District Judge	Omar A. Williams	Hartford	1977	2021–present	—	—	Biden
43	District Judge	Vernon D. Oliver	Hartford	1971	2023–present	—	—	Biden
44	District Judge	Sarah F. Russell	Bridgeport	1976	2024–present	—	—	Biden
45	District Judge	vacant	—	—	—	—	—	—
27	Senior Judge	Robert Chatigny	Hartford	1951	1994–2016	2003–2009	2016–present	Clinton
29	Senior Judge	Alvin W. Thompson	Hartford	1953	1994–2018	2009–2013	2018–present	Clinton
30	Senior Judge	Janet Bond Arterton	inactive	1944	1995–2014	—	2014–present	Clinton
32	Senior Judge	Janet C. Hall	New Haven	1948	1997–2021	2013–2018	2021–present	Clinton
33	Senior Judge	Stefan R. Underhill	Bridgeport	1956	1999–2022	2018–2022	2022–present	Clinton
35	Senior Judge	Vanessa Lynne Bryant	inactive	1954	2007–2021	—	2021–present	G.W. Bush

== District of Delaware ==
As of January 4, 2024:

#	Title	Judge	Duty station	Born	Term of service			Appointed by
#	Title	Judge	Duty station	Born	Active	Chief	Senior	Appointed by
26	Chief Judge	Colm Connolly	Wilmington	1964	2018–present	2021–present	—	Trump
27	District Judge	Maryellen Noreika	Wilmington	1966	2018–present	—	—	Trump
28	District Judge	Gregory B. Williams	Wilmington	1969	2022–present	—	—	Biden
29	District Judge	Jennifer L. Hall	Wilmington	1976	2024–present	—	—	Biden
17	Senior Judge	Joseph J. Longobardi	inactive	1930	1984–1997	1989–1996	1997–present	Reagan
25	Senior Judge	Richard G. Andrews	Wilmington	1955	2011–2023	—	2023–present	Obama

== Middle District of Florida ==
As of August 31, 2025:

#	Title	Judge	Duty station	Born	Term of service			Appointed by
#	Title	Judge	Duty station	Born	Active	Chief	Senior	Appointed by
32	Chief Judge	Marcia Morales Howard	Jacksonville	1965	2007–present	2024–present	—	G.W. Bush
33	District Judge	Mary Stenson Scriven	Tampa	1962	2008–present	—	—	G.W. Bush
36	District Judge	Sheri Polster Chappell	Ft. Myers	1962	2013–present	—	—	Obama
38	District Judge	Paul G. Byron	Orlando	1959	2014–present	—	—	Obama
39	District Judge	Carlos E. Mendoza	Orlando	1970	2014–present	—	—	Obama
40	District Judge	William F. Jung	Tampa	1958	2018–present	—	—	Trump
41	District Judge	Thomas Barber	Tampa	1966	2019–present	—	—	Trump
42	District Judge	Wendy Berger	Jacksonville	1968	2019–present	—	—	Trump
43	District Judge	John Badalamenti	Ft. Myers	1973	2020–present	—	—	Trump
44	District Judge	Kathryn Kimball Mizelle	Tampa	1987	2020–present	—	—	Trump
45	District Judge	Julie S. Sneed	Orlando	1969	2024–present	—	—	Biden
46	District Judge	Kyle Dudek	Ft. Myers	1985	2025–present	—	—	Trump
47	District Judge	vacant	—	—	—	—	—	—
48	District Judge	vacant	—	—	—	—	—	—
49	District Judge	vacant	—	—	—	—	—	—
15	Senior Judge	Elizabeth A. Kovachevich	Tampa	1936	1982–2018	1996–2002	2018–present	Reagan
17	Senior Judge	Patricia C. Fawsett	Orlando	1943	1986–2008	2003–2008	2008–present	Reagan
19	Senior Judge	Harvey E. Schlesinger	Jacksonville	1940	1991–2006	—	2006–present	G.H.W. Bush
20	Senior Judge	Anne C. Conway	Orlando	1950	1991–2015	2008–2015	2015–present	G.H.W. Bush
21	Senior Judge	Steven Douglas Merryday	Tampa	1950	1992–2025	2015–2020	2025–present	G.H.W. Bush
22	Senior Judge	Henry Lee Adams Jr.	Jacksonville	1945	1993–2010	—	2010–present	Clinton
23	Senior Judge	Susan C. Bucklew	Tampa	1942	1993–2008	—	2008–present	Clinton
24	Senior Judge	Richard A. Lazzara	Tampa	1945	1997–2011	—	2011–present	Clinton
25	Senior Judge	James D. Whittemore	Tampa	1952	2000–2017	—	2017–present	Clinton
26	Senior Judge	John Antoon	Orlando	1946	2000–2013	—	2013–present	Clinton
27	Senior Judge	John E. Steele	Ft. Myers	1949	2000–2015	—	2015–present	Clinton
28	Senior Judge	James S. Moody Jr.	Tampa	1947	2000–2014	—	2014–present	Clinton
29	Senior Judge	Gregory A. Presnell	Orlando	1942	2000–2012	—	2012–present	Clinton
30	Senior Judge	Timothy J. Corrigan	Jacksonville	1956	2002–2024	2020–2024	2024–present	G.W. Bush
31	Senior Judge	Virginia M. Hernandez Covington	Tampa	1955	2004–2020	—	2020–present	G.W. Bush
34	Senior Judge	Charlene Edwards Honeywell	Tampa	1957	2009–2023	—	2023–present	Obama
35	Senior Judge	Roy B. Dalton Jr.	Orlando	1952	2011–2022	—	2022–present	Obama
37	Senior Judge	Brian J. Davis	Jacksonville	1953	2013–2023	—	2023–present	Obama

== Northern District of Florida ==
As of July 14, 2025:

#	Title	Judge	Duty station	Born	Term of service			Appointed by
#	Title	Judge	Duty station	Born	Active	Chief	Senior	Appointed by
25	Chief Judge	Allen Winsor	Tallahassee	1976	2019–present	2025–present	—	Trump
22	District Judge	M. Casey Rodgers	Pensacola	1964	2003–present	2011–2018	—	G.W. Bush
24	District Judge	Mark E. Walker	Tallahassee	1967	2012–present	2018–2025	—	Obama
26	District Judge	T. Kent Wetherell II	Pensacola	1970	2019–present	—	—	Trump
19	Senior Judge	Lacey A. Collier	Pensacola	1935	1991–2003	—	2003–present	G.H.W. Bush
20	Senior Judge	Robert Hinkle	Tallahassee	1951	1996–2016	2004–2009	2016–present	Clinton

== Southern District of Florida ==
As of March 4, 2024:

#	Title	Judge	Duty station	Born	Term of service			Appointed by
#	Title	Judge	Duty station	Born	Active	Chief	Senior	Appointed by
58	Chief Judge	Cecilia Altonaga	Miami	1962	2003–present	2021–present	—	G.W. Bush
45	District Judge	K. Michael Moore	Miami	1951	1992–present	2014–2021	—	G.H.W. Bush
50	District Judge	Donald M. Middlebrooks	West Palm Beach	1946	1997–present	—	—	Clinton
52	District Judge	William Dimitrouleas	Ft. Lauderdale	1951	1998–present	—	—	Clinton
57	District Judge	Jose E. Martinez	Miami	1941	2002–present	—	—	G.W. Bush
61	District Judge	Kathleen M. Williams	Miami	1956	2011–present	—	—	Obama
64	District Judge	Darrin P. Gayles	Miami	1966	2014–present	—	—	Obama
65	District Judge	Beth Bloom	Miami	1962	2014–present	—	—	Obama
66	District Judge	Robin L. Rosenberg	West Palm Beach	1962	2014–present	—	—	Obama
67	District Judge	Roy Altman	Miami	1982	2019–present	—	—	Trump
68	District Judge	Rodolfo Ruiz	Miami	1979	2019–present	—	—	Trump
69	District Judge	Rodney Smith	Ft. Lauderdale	1974	2019–present	—	—	Trump
70	District Judge	Raag Singhal	Ft. Lauderdale	1963	2019–present	—	—	Trump
71	District Judge	Aileen Cannon	Ft. Pierce	1981	2020–present	—	—	Trump
72	District Judge	Jacqueline Becerra	Miami	1970	2024–present	—	—	Biden
73	District Judge	David S. Leibowitz	Ft. Lauderdale	1971	2024–present	—	—	Biden
74	District Judge	Melissa Damian	Ft. Lauderdale	1968	2024–present	—	—	Biden
75	District Judge	Ed Artau	West Palm Beach	1964	2025–present	—	—	Trump
76	District Judge	vacant	—	—	—	—	—	—
27	Senior Judge	James Lawrence King	Miami	1927	1970–1992	1984–1991	1992–present	Nixon
31	Senior Judge	Jose Alejandro Gonzalez Jr.	Ft. Lauderdale	1931	1978–1996	—	1996–present	Carter
40	Senior Judge	William J. Zloch	Ft. Lauderdale	1944	1985–2017	2000–2007	2017–present	Reagan
42	Senior Judge	Federico A. Moreno	Miami	1952	1990–2020	2007–2014	2020–present	G.H.W. Bush
43	Senior Judge	Donald L. Graham	Miami	1948	1991–2013	—	2013–present	G.H.W. Bush
48	Senior Judge	Daniel T. K. Hurley	West Palm Beach	1943	1994–2009	—	2009–present	Clinton
49	Senior Judge	Joan A. Lenard	Miami	1952	1995–2017	—	2017–present	Clinton
51	Senior Judge	Alan Stephen Gold	inactive	1944	1997–2010	—	2010–present	Clinton
53	Senior Judge	Patricia A. Seitz	Miami	1946	1998–2012	—	2012–present	Clinton
55	Senior Judge	Paul Huck	Miami	1940	2000–2010	—	2010–present	Clinton
56	Senior Judge	Kenneth Marra	West Palm Beach	1951	2002–2017	—	2017–present	G.W. Bush
59	Senior Judge	James I. Cohn	Ft. Lauderdale	1948	2003–2016	—	2016–present	G.W. Bush
62	Senior Judge	Robert N. Scola Jr.	Miami	1955	2011–2023	—	2023–present	Obama

== Middle District of Georgia ==
As of June 1, 2024:

#	Title	Judge	Duty station	Born	Term of service			Appointed by
#	Title	Judge	Duty station	Born	Active	Chief	Senior	Appointed by
14	Chief Judge	Leslie Abrams Gardner	Albany	1974	2014–present	2024–present	—	Obama
12	District Judge	Clay D. Land	Columbus	1960	2001–present	2014–2020	—	G.W. Bush
13	District Judge	Marc T. Treadwell	Macon	1955	2010–present	2020–2024	—	Obama
15	District Judge	Tripp Self	Macon	1968	2018–present	—	—	Trump
9	Senior Judge	W. Louis Sands	Albany	1949	1994–2014	2001–2006	2014–present	Clinton
11	Senior Judge	C. Ashley Royal	Macon	1949	2001–2016	2008–2014	2016–present	G.W. Bush

== Northern District of Georgia ==
As of May 24, 2025:

#	Title	Judge	Duty station	Born	Term of service			Appointed by
#	Title	Judge	Duty station	Born	Active	Chief	Senior	Appointed by
40	Chief Judge	Leigh Martin May	Atlanta	1971	2014–present	2025–present	—	Obama
41	District Judge	Mark Howard Cohen	Atlanta	1955	2014–present	—	—	Obama
42	District Judge	Eleanor L. Ross	Atlanta	1967	2014–present	—	—	Obama
43	District Judge	Michael Lawrence Brown	Atlanta	1968	2018–present	—	—	Trump
44	District Judge	William M. Ray II	Atlanta	1963	2018–present	—	—	Trump
45	District Judge	J. P. Boulee	Atlanta	1971	2019–present	—	—	Trump
46	District Judge	Steven D. Grimberg	Atlanta	1974	2019–present	—	—	Trump
47	District Judge	Victoria Calvert	Atlanta	1981	2022–present	—	—	Biden
48	District Judge	Sarah Geraghty	Atlanta	1974	2022–present	—	—	Biden
49	District Judge	Tiffany R. Johnson	Atlanta	1986	2025–present	—	—	Biden
50	District Judge	vacant	—	—	—	—	—	—
23	Senior Judge	Orinda Dale Evans	inactive	1943	1979–2008	1999–2006	2008–present	Carter
29	Senior Judge	Clarence Cooper	inactive	1942	1994–2009	—	2009–present	Clinton
31	Senior Judge	Willis B. Hunt Jr.	inactive	1932	1995–2005	—	2005–present	Clinton
32	Senior Judge	Thomas W. Thrash Jr.	Atlanta	1951	1997–2021	2014–2021	2021–present	Clinton
33	Senior Judge	Richard W. Story	Atlanta; Gainesville	1953	1998–2018	—	2018–present	Clinton
34	Senior Judge	Charles A. Pannell Jr.	inactive	1946	1999–2013	—	2013–present	Clinton
38	Senior Judge	Amy Totenberg	Atlanta	1950	2011–2021	—	2021–present	Obama
39	Senior Judge	Steve C. Jones	Atlanta	1957	2011–2025	—	2025–present	Obama

== Southern District of Georgia ==
As of May 5, 2024:

#	Title	Judge	Duty station	Born	Term of service			Appointed by
#	Title	Judge	Duty station	Born	Active	Chief	Senior	Appointed by
16	Chief Judge	R. Stan Baker	Savannah	1977	2018–present	2024–present	—	Trump
14	District Judge	Lisa Godbey Wood	Brunswick	1963	2007–present	2010–2017	—	G.W. Bush
15	District Judge	James Randal Hall	Augusta	1958	2008–present	2017–2024	—	G.W. Bush
12	Senior Judge	Dudley Hollingsworth Bowen Jr.	Augusta	1941	1979–2006	1997–2004	2006–present	Carter

== District Court of Guam ==
As of August 8, 2006:

#	Title	Judge	Duty station	Born	Term of service			Appointed by
#	Title	Judge	Duty station	Born	Active	Chief	Senior	Appointed by
6	Chief Judge	Frances Tydingco-Gatewood	Hagåtña	1958	2006–present	2006–present	—	G.W. Bush

== District of Hawaii ==
As of October 15, 2024:

#	Title	Judge	Duty station	Born	Term of service			Appointed by
#	Title	Judge	Duty station	Born	Active	Chief	Senior	Appointed by
13	Chief Judge	Derrick Watson	Honolulu	1966	2013–present	2022–present	—	Obama
14	District Judge	Jill Otake	Honolulu	1973	2018–present	—	—	Trump
15	District Judge	Micah W. J. Smith	Honolulu	1981	2024–present	—	—	Biden
16	District Judge	Shanlyn A. S. Park	Honolulu	1969	2024–present	—	—	Biden
8	Senior Judge	David Alan Ezra	San Antonio, Texas (Note: Judge Ezra has sat with the Western District of Texas since taking senior status.)	1947	1988–2012	1999–2005	2012–present	Reagan
9	Senior Judge	Helen W. Gillmor	Honolulu	1942	1994–2009	2005–2009	2009–present	Clinton
10	Senior Judge	Susan Oki Mollway	Honolulu	1950	1998–2015	2009–2015	2015–present	Clinton
11	Senior Judge	John Michael Seabright	Honolulu	1959	2005–2024	2015–2022	2024–present	G.W. Bush
12	Senior Judge	Leslie E. Kobayashi	Honolulu	1957	2010–2024	—	2024–present	Obama

== District of Idaho ==
As of May 17, 2023:

#	Title	Judge	Duty station	Born	Term of service			Appointed by
#	Title	Judge	Duty station	Born	Active	Chief	Senior	Appointed by
12	Chief Judge	David Nye	Pocatello	1958	2017–present	2019–present	—	Trump
13	District Judge	Amanda Brailsford	Boise	1967	2023–present	—	—	Biden
10	Senior Judge	Edward Lodge	inactive	1933	1989–2015	1992–1999	2015–present	G.H.W. Bush
11	Senior Judge	B. Lynn Winmill	Boise	1952	1995–2021	1999–2019	2021–present	Clinton

== Central District of Illinois ==
As of April 1, 2025:

#	Title	Judge	Duty station	Born	Term of service			Appointed by
#	Title	Judge	Duty station	Born	Active	Chief	Senior	Appointed by
11	Chief Judge	Sara Darrow	Rock Island	1970	2011–present	2019–present	—	Obama
12	District Judge	Colin S. Bruce	Urbana	1965	2013–present	—	—	Obama
13	District Judge	Colleen Lawless	Springfield	1983	2023–present	—	—	Biden
14	District Judge	Jonathan E. Hawley	Peoria	1971	2024–present	—	—	Biden
4	Senior Judge	Michael M. Mihm	Peoria	1943	1982–2009	1991–1998	2009–present	Reagan
6	Senior Judge	Joe Billy McDade	Peoria	1937	1991–2010	1998–2004	2010–present	G.H.W. Bush
10	Senior Judge	Sue E. Myerscough	Springfield	1951	2011–2023	—	2023–present	Obama

== Northern District of Illinois ==
As of November 20, 2024:

#	Title	Judge	Duty station	Born	Term of service			Appointed by
#	Title	Judge	Duty station	Born	Active	Chief	Senior	Appointed by
80	Chief Judge	Virginia Mary Kendall	Chicago	1962	2006–present	2024–present	—	G.W. Bush
82	District Judge	Robert Michael Dow Jr.	Chicago	1965	2007–present	—	—	G.W. Bush
84	District Judge	Sharon Johnson Coleman	Chicago	1960	2010–present	—	—	Obama
85	District Judge	Edmond E. Chang	Chicago	1970	2010–present	—	—	Obama
87	District Judge	John Tharp	Chicago	1960	2012–present	—	—	Obama
89	District Judge	Sara L. Ellis	Chicago	1969	2013–present	—	—	Obama
90	District Judge	Andrea Wood	Chicago	1973	2013–present	—	—	Obama
91	District Judge	Manish S. Shah	Chicago	1972	2014–present	—	—	Obama
92	District Judge	Jorge L. Alonso	Chicago	1966	2014–present	—	—	Obama
93	District Judge	John Robert Blakey	Chicago	1965	2014–present	—	—	Obama
94	District Judge	Martha M. Pacold	Chicago	1979	2019–present	—	—	Trump
95	District Judge	Mary M. Rowland	Chicago	1961	2019–present	—	—	Trump
96	District Judge	Steven C. Seeger	Chicago	1971	2019–present	—	—	Trump
97	District Judge	John F. Kness	Chicago	1969	2020–present	—	—	Trump
98	District Judge	Franklin U. Valderrama	Chicago	1962	2020–present	—	—	Trump
99	District Judge	Iain D. Johnston	Rockford	1965	2020–present	—	—	Trump
101	District Judge	Lindsay C. Jenkins	Chicago	1977	2023–present	—	—	Biden
102	District Judge	LaShonda A. Hunt	Chicago	1970	2023–present	—	—	Biden
103	District Judge	Jeremy C. Daniel	Chicago	1978	2023–present	—	—	Biden
104	District Judge	Jeffrey Cummings	Chicago	1962	2023–present	—	—	Biden
105	District Judge	Sunil Harjani	Chicago	1974	2024–present	—	—	Biden
106	District Judge	Georgia N. Alexakis	Chicago	1978	2024–present	—	—	Biden
107	District Judge	April Perry	Chicago	1979	2024–present	—	—	Biden
45	Senior Judge	Marvin Aspen	Chicago	1934	1979–2002	1995–2002	2002–present	Carter
47	Senior Judge	Charles P. Kocoras	Chicago	1938	1980–2006	2002–2006	2006–present	Carter
53	Senior Judge	Charles Ronald Norgle Sr.	inactive	1937	1984–2022	—	2022–present	Reagan
60	Senior Judge	Suzanne B. Conlon	inactive	1939	1988–2004	—	2004–present	Reagan
61	Senior Judge	George M. Marovich	inactive	1931	1988–2000	—	2000–present	Reagan
64	Senior Judge	Philip Godfrey Reinhard	Rockford	1941	1992–2007	—	2007–present	G.H.W. Bush
68	Senior Judge	Robert Gettleman	Chicago	1943	1994–2009	—	2009–present	Clinton
69	Senior Judge	Elaine E. Bucklo	Chicago	1944	1994–2009	—	2009–present	Clinton
70	Senior Judge	Joan B. Gottschall	Chicago	1947	1996–2012	—	2012–present	Clinton
71	Senior Judge	Rebecca R. Pallmeyer	Chicago	1954	1998–2024	2019–2024	2024–present	Clinton
73	Senior Judge	Matthew Kennelly	Chicago	1956	1999–2021	—	2021–present	Clinton
74	Senior Judge	Ronald A. Guzman	Chicago	1948	1999–2014	—	2014–present	Clinton
75	Senior Judge	Joan Lefkow	Chicago	1944	2000–2012	—	2012–present	Clinton
81	Senior Judge	Frederick J. Kapala	inactive	1950	2007–2019	—	2019–present	G.W. Bush
88	Senior Judge	Thomas M. Durkin	Chicago	1953	2012–2023	—	2023–present	Obama

== Southern District of Illinois ==
As of September 23, 2020:

#	Title	Judge	Duty station	Born	Term of service			Appointed by
#	Title	Judge	Duty station	Born	Active	Chief	Senior	Appointed by
21	Chief Judge	Nancy J. Rosenstengel	East St. Louis	1968	2014–present	2019–present	—	Obama
22	District Judge	Staci M. Yandle	Benton	1961	2014–present	—	—	Obama
23	District Judge	Stephen P. McGlynn	East St. Louis	1962	2020–present	—	—	Trump
24	District Judge	David W. Dugan	East St. Louis	1960	2020–present	—	—	Trump
16	Senior Judge	John Phil Gilbert	Benton	1949	1992–2014	1993–2000	2014–present	G.H.W. Bush

== Northern District of Indiana ==
As of January 29, 2024:

#	Title	Judge	Duty station	Born	Term of service			Appointed by
#	Title	Judge	Duty station	Born	Active	Chief	Senior	Appointed by
18	Chief Judge	Holly A. Brady	Fort Wayne	1969	2019–present	2023–present	—	Trump
14	District Judge	Philip P. Simon	Hammond	1962	2003–present	2010–2017	—	G.W. Bush
19	District Judge	Damon R. Leichty	South Bend	1971	2019–present	—	—	Trump
20	District Judge	Cristal C. Brisco	South Bend	1981	2024–present	—	—	Biden
21	District Judge	Gretchen S. Lund	Hammond	1975	2024–present	—	—	Biden
11	Senior Judge	James Tyne Moody	Hammond	1938	1982–2003	—	2003–present	Reagan
12	Senior Judge	Robert Lowell Miller Jr.	inactive	1950	1985–2016	2003–2010	2016–present	Reagan
15	Senior Judge	Theresa Lazar Springmann	Hammond	1956	2003–2021	2017–2020	2021–present	G.W. Bush
16	Senior Judge	Joseph S. Van Bokkelen	Hammond	1943	2007–2017	—	2017–present	G.W. Bush
17	Senior Judge	Jon DeGuilio	Hammond	1955	2010–2023	2020–2023	2023–present	Obama

== Southern District of Indiana ==
As of July 11, 2025:

#	Title	Judge	Duty station	Born	Term of service			Appointed by
#	Title	Judge	Duty station	Born	Active	Chief	Senior	Appointed by
15	Chief Judge	James R. Sweeney II	Indianapolis; Terre Haute	1961	2018–present	2025–present	—	Trump
14	District Judge	Tanya Walton Pratt	Indianapolis; New Albany	1959	2010–present	2021–2025	—	Obama
16	District Judge	J. P. Hanlon	Indianapolis; Terre Haute	1970	2018–present	—	—	Trump
17	District Judge	Matthew P. Brookman	Evansville; Indianapolis	1968	2023–present	—	—	Biden
18	District Judge	vacant	—	—	—	—	—	—
7	Senior Judge	Sarah Evans Barker	Indianapolis; New Albany	1943	1984–2014	1994–2000	2014–present	Reagan
11	Senior Judge	Richard L. Young	Evansville; Indianapolis	1953	1998–2023	2009–2016	2023–present	Clinton
12	Senior Judge	William T. Lawrence	inactive	1947	2008–2018	—	2018–present	G.W. Bush
13	Senior Judge	Jane Magnus-Stinson	Indianapolis; Terre Haute; New Albany	1958	2010–2024	2016–2021	2024–present	Obama

== Northern District of Iowa ==
As of February 12, 2024:

#	Title	Judge	Duty station	Born	Term of service			Appointed by
#	Title	Judge	Duty station	Born	Active	Chief	Senior	Appointed by
13	Chief Judge	C. J. Williams	Cedar Rapids	1963	2018–present	2024–present	—	Trump
12	District Judge	Leonard T. Strand	Sioux City	1965	2016–present	2017–2024	—	Obama
11	Senior Judge	Linda R. Reade	Cedar Rapids	1948	2002–2017	2007–2017	2017–present	G.W. Bush

== Southern District of Iowa ==
As of December 6, 2022:

#	Title	Judge	Duty station	Born	Term of service			Appointed by
#	Title	Judge	Duty station	Born	Active	Chief	Senior	Appointed by
19	Chief Judge	Stephanie M. Rose	Des Moines	1972	2012–present	2022–present	—	Obama
20	District Judge	Rebecca Goodgame Ebinger	Des Moines	1975	2016–present	—	—	Obama
21	District Judge	Stephen H. Locher	Des Moines	1978	2022–present	—	—	Biden
15	Senior Judge	Ronald Earl Longstaff	inactive	1941	1991–2006	2001–2006	2006–present	G.H.W. Bush
16	Senior Judge	Robert W. Pratt	inactive	1947	1997–2012	2006–2011	2012–present	Clinton
17	Senior Judge	James E. Gritzner	Des Moines	1947	2002–2015	2011–2015	2015–present	G.W. Bush

== District of Kansas ==
As of September 1, 2025:

#	Title	Judge	Duty station	Born	Term of service			Appointed by
#	Title	Judge	Duty station	Born	Active	Chief	Senior	Appointed by
29	Chief Judge	John W. Broomes	Wichita	1969	2018–present	2025–present	—	Trump
30	District Judge	Holly Teeter	Kansas City	1979	2018–present	—	—	Trump
31	District Judge	Toby Crouse	Topeka	1975	2020–present	—	—	Trump
32	District Judge	vacant	—	—	—	—	—	—
33	District Judge	vacant	—	—	—	—	—	—
34	District Judge	vacant	—	—	—	—	—	—
21	Senior Judge	John Watson Lungstrum	Kansas City	1945	1991–2010	2001–2007	2010–present	G.H.W. Bush
22	Senior Judge	Monti Belot	inactive	1943	1991–2008	—	2008–present	G.H.W. Bush
23	Senior Judge	Kathryn H. Vratil	Kansas City	1949	1992–2014	2008–2014	2014–present	G.H.W. Bush
26	Senior Judge	Julie A. Robinson	Kansas City	1957	2001–2022	2017–2021	2022–present	G.W. Bush
27	Senior Judge	Eric F. Melgren	Wichita	1956	2008–2025	2021–2025	2025–present	G.W. Bush
28	Senior Judge	Daniel D. Crabtree	Kansas City	1956	2014–2025	—	2025–present	Obama

== Eastern District of Kentucky ==
As of February 1, 2025:

#	Title	Judge	Duty station	Born	Term of service			Appointed by
#	Title	Judge	Duty station	Born	Active	Chief	Senior	Appointed by
16	Chief Judge	David Bunning	Covington	1966	2002–present	2025–present	—	G.W. Bush
14	District Judge	Karen K. Caldwell	Lexington	1956	2001–present	2012–2019	—	G.W. Bush
17	District Judge	Gregory F. Van Tatenhove	Frankfort	1960	2006–present	—	—	G.W. Bush
19	District Judge	Claria Horn Boom (Note: Judge Boom is jointly appointed to the Eastern and Western Districts of Kentucky.)	London	1969	2018–present	—	—	Trump
20	District Judge	Robert E. Wier	Lexington	1967	2018–present	—	—	Trump
21	District Judge	vacant	—	—	—	—	—	—
8	Senior Judge	William Bertelsman	inactive	1936	1979–2001	1991–1998	2001–present	Carter
12	Senior Judge	Joseph Martin Hood	inactive	1942	1990–2007	2005–2007	2007–present	G.H.W. Bush
15	Senior Judge	Danny C. Reeves	Lexington	1957	2001–2025	2019–2025	2025–present	G.W. Bush

== Western District of Kentucky ==
As of September 1, 2023:

#	Title	Judge	Duty station	Born	Term of service			Appointed by
#	Title	Judge	Duty station	Born	Active	Chief	Senior	Appointed by
21	Chief Judge	Gregory N. Stivers	Bowling Green; Louisville; Paducah	1960	2014–present	2018–present	—	Obama
22	District Judge	David J. Hale	Louisville	1967	2014–present	—	—	Obama
23	District Judge	Claria Horn Boom (Note: Judge Boom is jointly appointed to the Eastern and Western Districts of Kentucky.)	Louisville	1969	2018–present	—	—	Trump
24	District Judge	Rebecca Grady Jennings	Louisville	1978	2018–present	—	—	Trump
26	District Judge	Benjamin Beaton	Louisville	1981	2020–present	—	—	Trump
16	Senior Judge	Charles Ralph Simpson III	Louisville	1945	1986–2013	1994–2001	2013–present	Reagan
20	Senior Judge	Joseph H. McKinley Jr.	Louisville; Owensboro	1954	1995–2019	2011–2018	2019–present	Clinton

== Eastern District of Louisiana ==
As of May 15, 2025:

#	Title	Judge	Duty station	Born	Term of service			Appointed by
#	Title	Judge	Duty station	Born	Active	Chief	Senior	Appointed by
57	Chief Judge	Wendy Vitter	New Orleans	1961	2019–present	2025–present	—	Trump
51	District Judge	Jay C. Zainey	New Orleans	1951	2002–present	—	—	G.W. Bush
53	District Judge	Nannette Jolivette Brown	New Orleans	1963	2011–present	2018–2025	—	Obama
54	District Judge	Jane Triche Milazzo	New Orleans	1957	2011–present	—	—	Obama
55	District Judge	Susie Morgan	New Orleans	1953	2012–present	—	—	Obama
56	District Judge	Barry Ashe	New Orleans	1956	2018–present	—	—	Trump
58	District Judge	Greg G. Guidry	New Orleans	1960	2019–present	—	—	Trump
59	District Judge	Darrel J. Papillion	New Orleans	1968	2023–present	—	—	Biden
60	District Judge	Brandon Scott Long	New Orleans	1976	2023–present	—	—	Biden
61	District Judge	vacant	—	—	—	—	—	—
62	District Judge	vacant	—	—	—	—	—	—
63	District Judge	vacant	—	—	—	—	—	—
43	Senior Judge	Sarah S. Vance	New Orleans	1950	1994–2024	2008–2015	2024–present	Clinton
46	Senior Judge	Eldon E. Fallon	New Orleans	1939	1995–2024	—	2024–present	Clinton
47	Senior Judge	Mary Ann Vial Lemmon	New Orleans	1941	1996–2011	—	2011–present	Clinton
48	Senior Judge	Ivan L. R. Lemelle	New Orleans	1950	1998–2015	—	2015–present	Clinton
49	Senior Judge	Carl Barbier	New Orleans	1944	1998–2023	—	2023–present	Clinton
52	Senior Judge	Lance Africk	New Orleans	1951	2002–2024	—	2024–present	G.W. Bush

== Middle District of Louisiana ==
As of July 18, 2018:

#	Title	Judge	Duty station	Born	Term of service			Appointed by
#	Title	Judge	Duty station	Born	Active	Chief	Senior	Appointed by
7	Chief Judge	Shelly Dick	Baton Rouge	1960	2013–present	2018–present	—	Obama
6	District Judge	Brian A. Jackson	Baton Rouge	1960	2010–present	2011–2018	—	Obama
8	District Judge	John W. deGravelles	Baton Rouge	1949	2014–present	—	—	Obama

== Western District of Louisiana ==
As of December 22, 2023:

#	Title	Judge	Duty station	Born	Term of service			Appointed by
#	Title	Judge	Duty station	Born	Active	Chief	Senior	Appointed by
31	Chief Judge	Terry A. Doughty	Monroe	1959	2018–present	2022–present	—	Trump
29	District Judge	S. Maurice Hicks Jr.	Shreveport	1952	2003–present	2017–2022	—	G.W. Bush
32	District Judge	Robert R. Summerhays	Lafayette	1965	2018–present	—	—	Trump
34	District Judge	James D. Cain Jr.	Lake Charles	1964	2019–present	—	—	Trump
35	District Judge	David C. Joseph	Lafayette	1977	2020–present	—	—	Trump
36	District Judge	Jerry Edwards Jr.	Alexandria	1979	2023–present	—	—	Biden
37	District Judge	vacant	—	—	—	—	—	—
21	Senior Judge	Donald Ellsworth Walter	Shreveport	1936	1985–2001	—	2001–present	Reagan
23	Senior Judge	James Travis Trimble Jr.	inactive	1932	1991–2002	—	2002–present	G.H.W. Bush
25	Senior Judge	Tucker L. Melancon	Lafayette	1946	1994–2009	—	2009–present	Clinton
26	Senior Judge	Robert G. James	Monroe	1946	1998–2016	2009–2012	2016–present	Clinton
27	Senior Judge	Dee D. Drell	Alexandria	1947	2003–2017	2012–2017	2017–present	G.W. Bush
30	Senior Judge	Elizabeth Erny Foote	Shreveport	1953	2010–2022	—	2022–present	Obama

== District of Maine ==
As of August 22, 2024:

#	Title	Judge	Duty station	Born	Term of service			Appointed by
#	Title	Judge	Duty station	Born	Active	Chief	Senior	Appointed by
19	Chief Judge	Lance E. Walker	Bangor	1972	2018–present	2024–present	—	Trump
17	District Judge	Nancy Torresen	Portland	1959	2011–present	2015–2018	—	Obama
20	District Judge	Stacey D. Neumann	Portland	1978	2024–present	—	—	Biden
13	Senior Judge	D. Brock Hornby	inactive	1944	1990–2010	1996–2003	2010–present	G.H.W. Bush
15	Senior Judge	George Z. Singal	Portland	1945	2000–2013	2003–2009	2013–present	Clinton
16	Senior Judge	John A. Woodcock Jr.	Portland	1950	2003–2017	2009–2015	2017–present	G.W. Bush
18	Senior Judge	Jon D. Levy	inactive	1954	2014–2024	2019–2024	2024–present	Obama

== District of Maryland ==
As of January 11, 2025:

#	Title	Judge	Duty station	Born	Term of service			Appointed by
#	Title	Judge	Duty station	Born	Active	Chief	Senior	Appointed by
45	Chief Judge	George L. Russell III	Baltimore	1965	2012–present	2024–present	—	Obama
47	District Judge	Theodore D. Chuang	Greenbelt	1969	2014–present	—	—	Obama
49	District Judge	Paula Xinis	Greenbelt	1968	2016–present	—	—	Obama
50	District Judge	Stephanie A. Gallagher	Baltimore	1972	2019–present	—	—	Trump
51	District Judge	Deborah Boardman	Greenbelt	1974	2021–present	—	—	Biden
52	District Judge	Lydia Griggsby	Greenbelt	1968	2021–present	—	—	Biden
53	District Judge	Julie Rubin	Baltimore	1972	2022–present	—	—	Biden
54	District Judge	Brendan Hurson	Baltimore	1977	2023–present	—	—	Biden
55	District Judge	Matthew J. Maddox	Baltimore	1977	2023–present	—	—	Biden
56	District Judge	Adam B. Abelson	Baltimore	1982	2024–present	—	—	Biden
33	Senior Judge	William M. Nickerson	inactive	1933	1990–2002	—	2002–present	G.H.W. Bush
35	Senior Judge	Deborah K. Chasanow	Greenbelt	1948	1993–2014	2010–2014	2014–present	Clinton
38	Senior Judge	Catherine C. Blake	Baltimore	1950	1995–2021	2014–2017	2021–present	Clinton
41	Senior Judge	Richard D. Bennett	Baltimore	1947	2003–2021	—	2021–present	G.W. Bush
43	Senior Judge	James K. Bredar	Baltimore	1957	2010–2024	2017–2024	2024–present	Obama
44	Senior Judge	Ellen Lipton Hollander	Baltimore	1949	2010–2022	—	2022–present	Obama

== District of Massachusetts ==
As of July 31, 2025:

#	Title	Judge	Duty station	Born	Term of service			Appointed by
#	Title	Judge	Duty station	Born	Active	Chief	Senior	Appointed by
43	Chief Judge	Denise J. Casper	Boston	1968	2010–present	2025–present	—	Obama
38	District Judge	Richard G. Stearns	Boston	1944	1993–present	—	—	Clinton
45	District Judge	Indira Talwani	Boston	1960	2014–present	—	—	Obama
46	District Judge	Mark G. Mastroianni	Springfield	1964	2014–present	—	—	Obama
47	District Judge	Leo T. Sorokin	Boston	1961	2014–present	—	—	Obama
48	District Judge	Allison D. Burroughs	Boston	1961	2014–present	—	—	Obama
49	District Judge	Angel Kelley	Boston	1967	2021–present	—	—	Biden
50	District Judge	Margaret R. Guzman	Worcester	1960	2023–present	—	—	Biden
51	District Judge	Myong J. Joun	Boston	1971	2023–present	—	—	Biden
52	District Judge	Julia Kobick	Boston	1983	2023–present	—	—	Biden
53	District Judge	Brian E. Murphy	Boston	1979	2024–present	—	—	Biden
54	District Judge	vacant	—	—	—	—	—	—
55	District Judge	vacant	—	—	—	—	—	—
30	Senior Judge	Rya W. Zobel	Boston	1931	1979–2014	—	2014–present	Carter
31	Senior Judge	William G. Young	Boston	1940	1985–2021	1999–2005	2021–present	Reagan
32	Senior Judge	Mark L. Wolf	Boston	1946	1985–2013	2006–2012	2013–present	Reagan
33	Senior Judge	Douglas P. Woodlock	Boston	1947	1986–2015	—	2015–present	Reagan
35	Senior Judge	Nathaniel M. Gorton	Boston	1938	1992–2025	—	2025–present	G.H.W. Bush
37	Senior Judge	Patti B. Saris	Boston	1951	1993–2024	2013–2019	2024–present	Clinton
40	Senior Judge	Michael Ponsor	Springfield	1946	1994–2011	—	2011–present	Clinton
41	Senior Judge	George A. O'Toole Jr.	Boston	1947	1995–2018	—	2018–present	Clinton
42	Senior Judge	F. Dennis Saylor IV	Boston	1955	2004–2025	2020–2025	2025–present	G.W. Bush

== Eastern District of Michigan ==
As of July 28, 2025:

#	Title	Judge	Duty station	Born	Term of service			Appointed by
#	Title	Judge	Duty station	Born	Active	Chief	Senior	Appointed by
59	Chief Judge	Stephen Murphy III	Detroit	1962	2008–present	2025–present	—	G.W. Bush
58	District Judge	Thomas Lamson Ludington	Bay City	1953	2006–present	—	—	G.W. Bush
60	District Judge	Mark A. Goldsmith	Detroit	1952	2010–present	—	—	Obama
62	District Judge	Terrence Berg	Detroit	1959	2012–present	—	—	Obama
63	District Judge	Matthew F. Leitman	Detroit	1968	2014–present	—	—	Obama
64	District Judge	Judith E. Levy	Ann Arbor	1958	2014–present	—	—	Obama
65	District Judge	Laurie J. Michelson	Detroit	1967	2014–present	—	—	Obama
66	District Judge	Linda Vivienne Parker	Detroit	1958	2014–present	—	—	Obama
68	District Judge	Shalina D. Kumar	Flint	1971	2021–present	—	—	Biden
69	District Judge	F. Kay Behm	Flint	1969	2022–present	—	—	Biden
70	District Judge	Jonathan J. C. Grey	Detroit	1982	2023–present	—	—	Biden
71	District Judge	Susan K. DeClercq	Detroit	1974	2023–present	—	—	Biden
72	District Judge	Brandy R. McMillion	Detroit	1979	2023–present	—	—	Biden
73	District Judge	Robert J. White	Detroit	1985	2024–present	—	—	Biden
74	District Judge	vacant	—	—	—	—	—	—
44	Senior Judge	Bernard A. Friedman	Detroit	1943	1988–2009	2004–2009	2009–present	Reagan
47	Senior Judge	Robert Hardy Cleland	Port Huron	1947	1990–2013	—	2013–present	G.H.W. Bush
48	Senior Judge	Nancy Garlock Edmunds	Detroit	1947	1992–2012	—	2012–present	G.H.W. Bush
49	Senior Judge	Denise Page Hood	Detroit	1952	1994–2022	2015–2022	2022–present	Clinton
50	Senior Judge	Paul D. Borman	Detroit	1939	1994–2023	—	2023–present	Clinton
52	Senior Judge	George Caram Steeh III	Detroit	1947	1998–2013	—	2013–present	Clinton
56	Senior Judge	David M. Lawson	Detroit	1951	2000–2021	—	2021–present	Clinton
61	Senior Judge	Gershwin A. Drain	Detroit	1949	2012–2022	—	2022–present	Obama

== Western District of Michigan ==
As of June 8, 2023:

#	Title	Judge	Duty station	Born	Term of service			Appointed by
#	Title	Judge	Duty station	Born	Active	Chief	Senior	Appointed by
22	Chief Judge	Hala Y. Jarbou	Lansing	1971	2020–present	2022–present	—	Trump
19	District Judge	Paul Lewis Maloney	Kalamazoo	1949	2007–present	2008–2015	—	G.W. Bush
20	District Judge	Robert James Jonker	Grand Rapids	1960	2007–present	2015–2022	—	G.W. Bush
23	District Judge	Jane M. Beckering	Grand Rapids	1965	2021–present	—	—	Biden
18	Senior Judge	Gordon Jay Quist	inactive	1937	1992–2006	—	2006–present	G.H.W. Bush
21	Senior Judge	Janet T. Neff	Grand Rapids	1945	2007–2021	—	2021–present	G.W. Bush

== District of Minnesota ==
As of September 16, 2024:

#	Title	Judge	Duty station	Born	Term of service			Appointed by
#	Title	Judge	Duty station	Born	Active	Chief	Senior	Appointed by
33	Chief Judge	Patrick J. Schiltz	Minneapolis	1960	2006–present	2022–present	—	G.W. Bush
36	District Judge	Eric C. Tostrud	Saint Paul	1965	2018–present	—	—	Trump
37	District Judge	Nancy E. Brasel	Minneapolis	1969	2018–present	—	—	Trump
38	District Judge	Katherine M. Menendez	Minneapolis	1971	2021–present	—	—	Biden
39	District Judge	Jerry W. Blackwell	Saint Paul	1962	2022–present	—	—	Biden
40	District Judge	Jeffrey Bryan	Saint Paul	1976	2023–present	—	—	Biden
41	District Judge	Laura Provinzino	Saint Paul	1975	2024–present	—	—	Biden
20	Senior Judge	Donald Alsop	Saint Paul	1927	1974–1992	1985–1992	1992–present	Ford (Note: Judge Alsop was nominated by President Nixon but was officially appointed to the Court by (i.e., received his commission from) President Ford.)
24	Senior Judge	Paul A. Magnuson	Saint Paul	1937	1981–2002	1994–2001	2002–present	Reagan
26	Senior Judge	David S. Doty	Minneapolis	1929	1987–1998	—	1998–present	Reagan
28	Senior Judge	Michael J. Davis	Minneapolis	1947	1994–2015	2008–2015	2015–present	Clinton
29	Senior Judge	John R. Tunheim	Minneapolis	1953	1995–2023	2015–2022	2023–present	Clinton
30	Senior Judge	Ann D. Montgomery	Minneapolis	1949	1996–2016	—	2016–present	Clinton
31	Senior Judge	Donovan W. Frank	Saint Paul	1951	1998–2016	—	2016–present	Clinton
32	Senior Judge	Joan N. Ericksen	Minneapolis	1954	2002–2019	—	2019–present	G.W. Bush
34	Senior Judge	Susan Richard Nelson	Saint Paul	1952	2010–2021	—	2021–present	Obama
35	Senior Judge	Wilhelmina Wright	Saint Paul	1964	2016–2024	—	2024–present	Obama

== Northern District of Mississippi ==
As of April 15, 2025:

#	Title	Judge	Duty station	Born	Term of service			Appointed by
#	Title	Judge	Duty station	Born	Active	Chief	Senior	Appointed by
16	Chief Judge	Debra M. Brown	Greenville	1963	2013–present	2021–present	—	Obama
17	District Judge	vacant	—	—	—	—	—	—
18	District Judge	vacant	—	—	—	—	—	—
12	Senior Judge	Glen H. Davidson	Aberdeen	1941	1985–2007	2000–2007	2007–present	Reagan
14	Senior Judge	Michael P. Mills	Oxford	1956	2001–2021	2007–2014	2021–present	G.W. Bush
15	Senior Judge	Sharion Aycock	Aberdeen	1955	2007–2025	2014–2021	2025–present	G.W. Bush

== Southern District of Mississippi ==
As of November 4, 2024:

#	Title	Judge	Duty station	Born	Term of service			Appointed by
#	Title	Judge	Duty station	Born	Active	Chief	Senior	Appointed by
19	Chief Judge	Halil Suleyman Ozerden	Gulfport	1966	2007–present	2024–present	—	G.W. Bush
12	District Judge	Henry Travillion Wingate	Jackson	1947	1985–present	2003–2010	—	Reagan
18	District Judge	Daniel P. Jordan III	Jackson	1964	2006–present	2017–2024	—	G.W. Bush
20	District Judge	Carlton W. Reeves	Jackson	1964	2010–present	—	—	Obama
21	District Judge	Kristi Haskins Johnson	Jackson	1980	2020–present	—	—	Trump
22	District Judge	Taylor B. McNeel	Gulfport	1983	2020–present	—	—	Trump
11	Senior Judge	Tom Stewart Lee	Jackson	1941	1984–2006	1996–2003	2006–present	Reagan
15	Senior Judge	David C. Bramlette	Natchez	1939	1991–2006	—	2006–present	G.H.W. Bush
16	Senior Judge	Louis Guirola Jr.	Gulfport	1951	2004–2018	2010–2017	2018–present	G.W. Bush
17	Senior Judge	Keith Starrett	Hattiesburg	1951	2004–2019	—	2019–present	G.W. Bush

== Eastern District of Missouri ==
As of July 24, 2025:

#	Title	Judge	Duty station	Born	Term of service			Appointed by
#	Title	Judge	Duty station	Born	Active	Chief	Senior	Appointed by
41	Chief Judge	Stephen R. Clark	St. Louis	1966	2019–present	2022–present	—	Trump
35	District Judge	Henry Autrey	St. Louis	1952	2002–present	—	—	G.W. Bush
39	District Judge	Brian C. Wimes (Note: Jointly appointed to the Eastern and Western Districts of Missouri)	none (Note: Judge Wimes maintains chambers only in the Western District.)	1966	2012–present	—	—	Obama
42	District Judge	Sarah Pitlyk	St. Louis	1977	2019–present	—	—	Trump
43	District Judge	Matthew T. Schelp	St. Louis	1970	2020–present	—	—	Trump
44	District Judge	Cristian Stevens	St. Louis	1973	2025–present	—	—	Trump
45	District Judge	Zach Bluestone	St. Louis	1986	2025–present (Note: By virtue of his seniority of age, Judge Bluestone holds seniority over Judge Divine despite their identical commission dates.)	—	—	Trump
46	District Judge	Josh Divine	St. Louis	1990	2025–present	—	—	Trump
47	District Judge	Maria Lanahan	St. Louis	1987	beg. 2025	—	—	Trump
21	Senior Judge	Edward Louis Filippine	inactive	1930	1977–1995	1990–1995	1995–present	Carter
27	Senior Judge	Jean Constance Hamilton	inactive	1945	1990–2013	1995–2002	2013–present	G.H.W. Bush
31	Senior Judge	Catherine D. Perry	St. Louis	1952	1994–2018	2009–2016	2018–present	Clinton
32	Senior Judge	E. Richard Webber	inactive	1942	1995–2009	—	2009–present	Clinton
33	Senior Judge	Nanette Kay Laughrey	none (Note: Judge Laughrey maintains chambers only in the Western District.)	1946	1996–2011	—	2011–present	Clinton
34	Senior Judge	Rodney W. Sippel	St. Louis	1956	1997–2023	2016–2022	2023–present	Clinton
36	Senior Judge	Stephen N. Limbaugh Jr.	Cape Girardeau	1952	2008–2020	—	2020–present	G.W. Bush
37	Senior Judge	Audrey G. Fleissig	St. Louis	1955	2010–2023	—	2023–present	Obama
38	Senior Judge	John Andrew Ross	St. Louis	1954	2011–2023	—	2023–present	Obama

== Western District of Missouri ==
As of July 24, 2025:

#	Title	Judge	Duty station	Born	Term of service			Appointed by
#	Title	Judge	Duty station	Born	Active	Chief	Senior	Appointed by
35	Chief Judge	Beth Phillips	Kansas City	1969	2012–present	2019–present	—	Obama
34	District Judge	David Gregory Kays	Kansas City	1962	2008–present	2014–2019	—	G.W. Bush
36	District Judge	Brian C. Wimes (Note: Jointly appointed to the Eastern and Western Districts of Missouri)	Kansas City	1966	2012–present	—	—	Obama
37	District Judge	M. Douglas Harpool	Springfield	1956	2014–present	—	—	Obama
38	District Judge	Stephen R. Bough	Kansas City	1970	2014–present	—	—	Obama
39	District Judge	Roseann A. Ketchmark	Kansas City	1963	2015–present	—	—	Obama
40	District Judge	Josh Divine	None (Note: Judge Divine maintains chambers only in the Eastern District.)	1990	2025–present	—	—	Trump
21	Senior Judge	Howard F. Sachs	Kansas City	1925	1979–1992	1990–1992	1992–present	Carter
27	Senior Judge	Dean Whipple	inactive	1938	1987–2007	2000–2007	2007–present	Reagan
28	Senior Judge	Fernando J. Gaitan Jr.	Kansas City	1948	1991–2014	2007–2014	2014–present	G.H.W. Bush
29	Senior Judge	Ortrie D. Smith	inactive	1946	1995–2011	—	2011–present	Clinton
30	Senior Judge	Gary A. Fenner	Kansas City	1947	1996–2015	—	2015–present	Clinton
31	Senior Judge	Nanette Kay Laughrey	inactive	1946	1996–2011	—	2011–present	Clinton
32	Senior Judge	Rodney W. Sippel	None (Note: Judge Sippel maintains chambers only in the Eastern District.)	1956	1997–2023	—	2023–present	Clinton

== District of Montana ==
As of June 14, 2023:

#	Title	Judge	Duty station	Born	Term of service			Appointed by
#	Title	Judge	Duty station	Born	Active	Chief	Senior	Appointed by
19	Chief Judge	Brian Morris	Great Falls	1963	2013–present	2020–present	—	Obama
18	District Judge	Dana L. Christensen	Missoula	1951	2011–present	2013–2020	—	Obama
20	District Judge	Susan P. Watters	Billings	1958	2013–present	—	—	Obama
15	Senior Judge	Donald W. Molloy	Missoula	1946	1996–2011	2001–2008	2011–present	Clinton
17	Senior Judge	Sam E. Haddon	inactive	1937	2001–2012	—	2012–present	G.W. Bush

== District of Nebraska ==
As of January 17, 2025:

#	Title	Judge	Duty station	Born	Term of service			Appointed by
#	Title	Judge	Duty station	Born	Active	Chief	Senior	Appointed by
22	Chief Judge	Robert F. Rossiter Jr.	Omaha	1956	2016–present	2021–present	—	Obama
23	District Judge	Brian C. Buescher	Omaha	1975	2019–present	—	—	Trump
24	District Judge	Susan M. Bazis	Lincoln	1968	2024–present	—	—	Biden
19	Senior Judge	Joseph Bataillon	Omaha	1949	1997–2014	2004–2011	2014–present	Clinton
21	Senior Judge	John M. Gerrard	Lincoln	1953	2012–2023	2018–2021	2023–present	Obama

== District of Nevada ==
As of October 1, 2024:

#	Title	Judge	Duty station	Born	Term of service			Appointed by
#	Title	Judge	Duty station	Born	Active	Chief	Senior	Appointed by
26	Chief Judge	Andrew P. Gordon	Las Vegas	1962	2013–present	2024–present	—	Obama
24	District Judge	Gloria Navarro	Las Vegas	1967	2010–present	2014–2019	—	Obama
25	District Judge	Miranda Du	Reno	1969	2012–present	2019–2024	—	Obama
27	District Judge	Jennifer A. Dorsey	Las Vegas	1971	2013–present	—	—	Obama
28	District Judge	Richard F. Boulware	Las Vegas	1968	2014–present	—	—	Obama
29	District Judge	Anne Traum	Reno	1969	2022–present	—	—	Biden
30	District Judge	Cristina D. Silva	Las Vegas	1979	2022–present	—	—	Biden
14	Senior Judge	Howard D. McKibben	Reno	1940	1984–2005	1997–2002	2005–present	Reagan
18	Senior Judge	Roger L. Hunt	inactive	1942	2000–2011	2007–2011	2011–present	Clinton
19	Senior Judge	Kent Dawson	Las Vegas	1944	2000–2012	—	2012–present	Clinton
21	Senior Judge	James C. Mahan	Las Vegas	1943	2002–2018	—	2018–present	G.W. Bush
22	Senior Judge	Robert Clive Jones	Reno	1947	2003–2016	2011–2014	2016–present	G.W. Bush

== District of New Hampshire ==
As of April 2, 2022:

#	Title	Judge	Duty station	Born	Term of service			Appointed by
#	Title	Judge	Duty station	Born	Active	Chief	Senior	Appointed by
17	Chief Judge	Landya B. McCafferty	Concord	1962	2013–present	2018–present	—	Obama
16	District Judge	Joseph Normand Laplante	Concord	1965	2007–present	2011–2018	—	G.W. Bush
18	District Judge	Samantha D. Elliott	Concord	1975	2021–present	—	—	Biden
14	Senior Judge	Paul Barbadoro	Concord	1955	1992–2021	1997–2004	2021–present	G.H.W. Bush
15	Senior Judge	Steven J. McAuliffe	Concord	1948	1992–2013	2004–2011	2013–present	G.H.W. Bush

== District of New Jersey ==
As of May 31, 2024:

#	Title	Judge	Duty station	Born	Term of service			Appointed by
#	Title	Judge	Duty station	Born	Active	Chief	Senior	Appointed by
77	Chief Judge	Renée Marie Bumb	Camden	1960	2006–present	2023–present	—	G.W. Bush
80	District Judge	Susan D. Wigenton	Newark	1962	2006–present	—	—	G.W. Bush
81	District Judge	Claire C. Cecchi	Newark	1964	2011–present	—	—	Obama
82	District Judge	Esther Salas	Newark	1968	2011–present	—	—	Obama
84	District Judge	Michael A. Shipp	Trenton	1965	2012–present	—	—	Obama
85	District Judge	Madeline Cox Arleo	Newark	1963	2014–present	—	—	Obama
87	District Judge	Brian R. Martinotti	Trenton	1961	2016–present	—	—	Obama
88	District Judge	Julien Neals	Newark	1965	2021–present	—	—	Biden
89	District Judge	Zahid Quraishi	Trenton	1975	2021–present	—	—	Biden
90	District Judge	Christine O'Hearn	Camden	1969	2021–present	—	—	Biden
91	District Judge	Karen M. Williams	Camden	1963	2021–present	—	—	Biden
92	District Judge	Georgette Castner	Trenton	1979	2022–present	—	—	Biden
93	District Judge	Evelyn Padin	Newark	1960	2022–present	—	—	Biden
94	District Judge	Michael E. Farbiarz	Newark	1973	2023–present	—	—	Biden
95	District Judge	Robert Kirsch	Trenton	1966	2023–present	—	—	Biden
96	District Judge	Jamel K. Semper	Newark	1981	2023–present	—	—	Biden
97	District Judge	Edward S. Kiel	Camden	1965	2024–present	—	—	Biden
51	Senior Judge	Anne Elise Thompson	inactive	1934	1979–2001	1994–2001	2001–present	Carter
54	Senior Judge	Joseph H. Rodriguez	Camden	1930	1985–1998	—	1998–present	Reagan
62	Senior Judge	Mary Little Cooper	inactive	1946	1992–2011	—	2011–present	G.H.W. Bush
68	Senior Judge	Katharine Sweeney Hayden	Newark	1942	1997–2010	—	2010–present	Clinton
72	Senior Judge	Bill Martini	Newark	1947	2002–2015	—	2015–present	G.W. Bush
74	Senior Judge	Stanley R. Chesler	Newark	1947	2002–2015	—	2015–present	G.W. Bush
79	Senior Judge	Peter G. Sheridan	inactive	1950	2006–2018	—	2018–present	G.W. Bush
83	Senior Judge	Kevin McNulty	inactive	1954	2012–2023	—	2023–present	Obama

== District of New Mexico ==
As of January 13, 2025:

#	Title	Judge	Duty station	Born	Term of service			Appointed by
#	Title	Judge	Duty station	Born	Active	Chief	Senior	Appointed by
22	Chief Judge	Kenneth J. Gonzales	Las Cruces	1964	2013–present	2025–present	—	Obama
20	District Judge	James O. Browning	Albuquerque	1956	2003–present	—	—	G.W. Bush
23	District Judge	Kea W. Riggs	Albuquerque	1965	2019–present	—	—	Trump
24	District Judge	Margaret Strickland	Las Cruces	1980	2021–present	—	—	Biden
25	District Judge	David H. Urias	Albuquerque	1967	2022–present	—	—	Biden
26	District Judge	Matthew L. Garcia	Albuquerque	1974	2023–present	—	—	Biden
27	District Judge	Sarah M. Davenport	Las Cruces	1976	2025–present	—	—	Biden
15	Senior Judge	Martha Vázquez	Santa Fe	1953	1993–2021	2003–2010	2021–present	Clinton
17	Senior Judge	Christina Armijo	inactive	1951	2001–2018	2012–2018	2018–present	G.W. Bush
18	Senior Judge	William P. Johnson	Albuquerque	1959	2001–2025	2018–2025	2025–present	G.W. Bush
19	Senior Judge	Robert C. Brack	Las Cruces	1953	2003–2018	—	2018–present	G.W. Bush
21	Senior Judge	Judith C. Herrera	Albuquerque	1954	2004–2019	—	2019–present	G.W. Bush

== Eastern District of New York ==
As of December 20, 2024:

#	Title	Judge	Duty station	Born	Term of service			Appointed by
#	Title	Judge	Duty station	Born	Active	Chief	Senior	Appointed by
58	Chief Judge	Margo Kitsy Brodie	Brooklyn	1966	2012–present	2021–present	—	Obama
59	District Judge	Pamela K. Chen	Brooklyn	1961	2013–present	—	—	Obama
61	District Judge	Ann Donnelly	Brooklyn	1959	2015–present	—	—	Obama
62	District Judge	LaShann DeArcy Hall	Brooklyn	1970	2015–present	—	—	Obama
63	District Judge	Rachel Kovner	Brooklyn	1979	2019–present	—	—	Trump
64	District Judge	Eric R. Komitee	Brooklyn	1970	2019–present	—	—	Trump
65	District Judge	Gary R. Brown	Central Islip	1963	2019–present	—	—	Trump
66	District Judge	Diane Gujarati	Brooklyn	1969	2020–present	—	—	Trump
67	District Judge	Hector Gonzalez	Brooklyn	1964	2022–present	—	—	Biden
68	District Judge	Nina Morrison	Brooklyn	1970	2022–present	—	—	Biden
69	District Judge	Orelia Merchant	Brooklyn	1971	2023–present	—	—	Biden
70	District Judge	Nusrat Jahan Choudhury	Central Islip	1976	2023–present	—	—	Biden
71	District Judge	Natasha C. Merle	Brooklyn	1983	2023–present	—	—	Biden
72	District Judge	Ramon Reyes	Brooklyn	1966	2023–present	—	—	Biden
73	District Judge	Sanket J. Bulsara	Central Islip; Brooklyn	1976	2024–present	—	—	Biden
32	Senior Judge	I. Leo Glasser	Brooklyn	1924	1981–1993	—	1993–present	Reagan
35	Senior Judge	Edward R. Korman	Brooklyn	1942	1985–2007	2000–2007	2007–present	Reagan
36	Senior Judge	Raymond Dearie	Brooklyn	1944	1986–2011	2007–2011	2011–present	Reagan
39	Senior Judge	Carol Amon	Brooklyn	1946	1990–2016	2011–2016	2016–present	G.H.W. Bush
41	Senior Judge	Denis Reagan Hurley	inactive	1937	1991–2004	—	2004–present	G.H.W. Bush
42	Senior Judge	Joanna Seybert	Central Islip	1946	1993–2014	—	2014–present	Clinton
44	Senior Judge	Frederic Block	Brooklyn	1934	1994–2005	—	2005–present	Clinton
46	Senior Judge	Allyne R. Ross	Brooklyn	1946	1994–2011	—	2011–present	Clinton
47	Senior Judge	Nina Gershon	Brooklyn	1940	1996–2008	—	2008–present	Clinton
48	Senior Judge	Nicholas Garaufis	Brooklyn	1948	2000–2014	—	2014–present	Clinton
50	Senior Judge	Dora Irizarry	Brooklyn	1955	2004–2020	2016–2020	2020–present	G.W. Bush
53	Senior Judge	Eric N. Vitaliano	Brooklyn	1948	2006–2017	—	2017–present	G.W. Bush
54	Senior Judge	Brian Cogan	Brooklyn	1954	2006–2020	—	2020–present	G.W. Bush
56	Senior Judge	Kiyo A. Matsumoto	Brooklyn	1955	2008–2022	—	2022–present	G.W. Bush
57	Senior Judge	William F. Kuntz II	Brooklyn	1950	2011–2022	—	2022–present	Obama
60	Senior Judge	Joan Azrack	Central Islip; Brooklyn	1951	2014–2024	—	2024–present	Obama

== Northern District of New York ==
As of December 9, 2024:

#	Title	Judge	Duty station	Born	Term of service			Appointed by
#	Title	Judge	Duty station	Born	Active	Chief	Senior	Appointed by
27	Chief Judge	Brenda K. Sannes	Syracuse	1958	2014–present	2022–present	—	Obama
26	District Judge	Mae D'Agostino	Albany	1954	2011–present	—	—	Obama
28	District Judge	Anne M. Nardacci	Albany	1977	2022–present	—	—	Biden
29	District Judge	Elizabeth C. Coombe	Syracuse	1967	2024–present	—	—	Biden
30	District Judge	Anthony Brindisi	Utica	1978	2024–present	—	—	Biden
17	Senior Judge	Thomas James McAvoy	Binghamton	1938	1986–2003	1993–2000	2003–present	Reagan
19	Senior Judge	Frederick Scullin	Syracuse	1939	1992–2006	2000–2006	2006–present	G.H.W. Bush
21	Senior Judge	Lawrence E. Kahn	Albany	1937	1996–2007	—	2007–present	Clinton
23	Senior Judge	David N. Hurd	Utica	1937	1999–2024	—	2024–present	Clinton
25	Senior Judge	Glenn T. Suddaby	Syracuse	1956	2008–2024	2015–2022	2024–present	G.W. Bush

== Southern District of New York ==
As of January 7, 2025:

#	Title	Judge	Duty station	Born	Term of service			Appointed by
#	Title	Judge	Duty station	Born	Active	Chief	Senior	Appointed by
125	Chief Judge	Laura Taylor Swain	Manhattan	1958	2000–present	2021–present	—	Clinton
110	District Judge	John G. Koeltl	Manhattan	1945	1994–present	—	—	Clinton
129	District Judge	Kenneth M. Karas	White Plains	1964	2004–present	—	—	G.W. Bush
132	District Judge	Cathy Seibel	White Plains	1960	2008–present	—	—	G.W. Bush
135	District Judge	J. Paul Oetken	Manhattan	1965	2011–present	—	—	Obama
136	District Judge	Paul A. Engelmayer	Manhattan	1961	2011–present	—	—	Obama
139	District Judge	Edgardo Ramos	Manhattan	1960	2011–present	—	—	Obama
140	District Judge	Andrew L. Carter Jr.	Manhattan	1969	2011–present	—	—	Obama
141	District Judge	Jesse M. Furman	Manhattan	1972	2012–present	—	—	Obama
142	District Judge	Ronnie Abrams	Manhattan	1968	2012–present	—	—	Obama
144	District Judge	Katherine Polk Failla	Manhattan	1969	2013–present	—	—	Obama
145	District Judge	Analisa Torres	Manhattan	1959	2013–present	—	—	Obama
146	District Judge	Nelson S. Román	White Plains	1960	2013–present	—	—	Obama
147	District Judge	Vernon S. Broderick	Manhattan	1963	2013–present	—	—	Obama
148	District Judge	Gregory H. Woods	Manhattan	1969	2013–present	—	—	Obama
150	District Judge	Mary Kay Vyskocil	Manhattan	1958	2019–present	—	—	Trump
151	District Judge	Lewis J. Liman	Manhattan	1960	2019–present	—	—	Trump
152	District Judge	Philip M. Halpern	White Plains	1956	2020–present	—	—	Trump
153	District Judge	John P. Cronan	Manhattan	1976	2020–present	—	—	Trump
154	District Judge	Jennifer L. Rochon	Manhattan	1970	2022–present	—	—	Biden
155	District Judge	Jennifer H. Rearden	Manhattan	1970	2022–present	—	—	Biden
156	District Judge	Arun Subramanian	Manhattan	1979	2023–present	—	—	Biden
157	District Judge	Jessica G. L. Clarke	Manhattan	1983	2023–present	—	—	Biden
158	District Judge	Dale Ho	Manhattan	1977	2023–present	—	—	Biden
159	District Judge	Margaret Garnett	Manhattan	1971	2024–present	—	—	Biden
160	District Judge	Jeannette Vargas	Manhattan	1973	2024–present	—	—	Biden
161	District Judge	vacant	—	—	—	—	—	—
162	District Judge	vacant	—	—	—	—	—	—
79	Senior Judge	Charles S. Haight Jr.	New Haven, CT (Note: Judge Haight has sat with the District of Connecticut since taking senior status.)	1930	1976–1995	—	1995–present	Ford
91	Senior Judge	Louis L. Stanton	Manhattan	1927	1985–1996	—	1996–present	Reagan
97	Senior Judge	Kimba Wood	Manhattan	1944	1988–2009	2006–2009	2009–present	Reagan
102	Senior Judge	Loretta Preska	Manhattan	1949	1992–2017	2009–2016	2017–present	G.H.W. Bush
108	Senior Judge	Denise Cote	Manhattan	1946	1994–2011	—	2011–present	Clinton
109	Senior Judge	Lewis A. Kaplan	Manhattan	1944	1994–2011	—	2011–present	Clinton
113	Senior Judge	Sidney H. Stein	Manhattan	1945	1995–2010	—	2010–present	Clinton
115	Senior Judge	Jed S. Rakoff	Manhattan	1943	1996–2010	—	2010–present	Clinton
117	Senior Judge	Richard M. Berman	Manhattan	1943	1998–2011	—	2011–present	Clinton
118	Senior Judge	Alvin Hellerstein	Manhattan	1933	1998–2011	—	2011–present	Clinton
119	Senior Judge	Colleen McMahon	Manhattan	1951	1998–2021	2016–2021	2021–present	Clinton
121	Senior Judge	Naomi Reice Buchwald	Manhattan	1944	1999–2012	—	2012–present	Clinton
122	Senior Judge	Victor Marrero	Manhattan	1941	1999–2010	—	2010–present	Clinton
123	Senior Judge	George B. Daniels	Manhattan	1953	2000–2021	—	2021–present	Clinton
126	Senior Judge	P. Kevin Castel	Manhattan	1950	2003–2017	—	2017–present	G.W. Bush
130	Senior Judge	Paul A. Crotty	Manhattan	1941	2005–2015	—	2015–present	G.W. Bush
133	Senior Judge	Paul G. Gardephe	Manhattan	1957	2008–2023	—	2023–present	G.W. Bush
134	Senior Judge	Vincent L. Briccetti	White Plains	1954	2011–2023	—	2023–present	Obama
143	Senior Judge	Lorna G. Schofield	Manhattan	1956	2012–2025	—	2025–present	Obama
149	Senior Judge	Valerie E. Caproni	Manhattan	1955	2013–2025	—	2025–present	Obama

== Western District of New York ==
As of August 1, 2024:

#	Title	Judge	Duty station	Born	Term of service			Appointed by
#	Title	Judge	Duty station	Born	Active	Chief	Senior	Appointed by
16	Chief Judge	Elizabeth A. Wolford	Rochester	1966	2013–present	2021–present	—	Obama
17	District Judge	Lawrence J. Vilardo	Buffalo	1955	2015–present	—	—	Obama
18	District Judge	John Sinatra	Buffalo	1972	2019–present	—	—	Trump
19	District Judge	Meredith Vacca	Rochester	1980	2024–present	—	—	Biden
11	Senior Judge	David G. Larimer	Rochester	1944	1987–2009	1996–2002	2009–present	Reagan
12	Senior Judge	Richard Arcara	Buffalo	1940	1988–2015	2003–2010	2015–present	Reagan
13	Senior Judge	William M. Skretny	Buffalo	1945	1990–2015	2010–2015	2015–present	G.H.W. Bush
14	Senior Judge	Charles J. Siragusa	Rochester	1947	1997–2012	—	2012–present	Clinton
15	Senior Judge	Frank P. Geraci Jr.	Rochester	1951	2013–2023	2015–2021	2023–present	Obama

== Eastern District of North Carolina ==
As of January 12, 2025:

#	Title	Judge	Duty station	Born	Term of service			Appointed by
#	Title	Judge	Duty station	Born	Active	Chief	Senior	Appointed by
16	Chief Judge	Richard E. Myers II	Wilmington	1967	2019–present	2021–present	—	Trump
12	District Judge	Terrence Boyle	Elizabeth City	1945	1984–present	1997–2004; 2018–2021	—	Reagan
14	District Judge	Louise Flanagan	New Bern	1962	2003–present	2004–2011	—	G.W. Bush
15	District Judge	James C. Dever III	Raleigh	1962	2005–present	2011–2018	—	G.W. Bush
10	Senior Judge	William Earl Britt	inactive	1932	1980–1997	1983–1990	1997–present	Carter

== Middle District of North Carolina ==
As of December 31, 2024:

#	Title	Judge	Duty station	Born	Term of service			Appointed by
#	Title	Judge	Duty station	Born	Active	Chief	Senior	Appointed by
13	Chief Judge	Catherine Eagles	Greensboro	1958	2010–2024	2023–present	2024–present	Obama
11	District Judge	William Lindsay Osteen Jr.	Greensboro	1960	2007–present	2012–2017	—	G.W. Bush
12	District Judge	Thomas D. Schroeder	Winston-Salem	1959	2008–present	2017–2023	—	G.W. Bush
15	District Judge	vacant	—	—	—	—	—	—
16	District Judge	vacant	—	—	—	—	—	—
8	Senior Judge	Norwood Carlton Tilley Jr.	Greensboro	1943	1988–2008	1999–2006	2008–present	Reagan
14	Senior Judge	Loretta Copeland Biggs	Winston-Salem	1954	2014–2024	—	2024–present	Obama

== Western District of North Carolina ==
As of February 28, 2025:

#	Title	Judge	Duty station	Born	Term of service			Appointed by
#	Title	Judge	Duty station	Born	Active	Chief	Senior	Appointed by
18	Chief Judge	Martin Karl Reidinger	Asheville	1958	2007–present	2020–present	—	G.W. Bush
19	District Judge	Max O. Cogburn Jr.	Asheville	1951	2011–present	—	—	Obama
20	District Judge	Kenneth D. Bell	Charlotte	1958	2019–present	—	—	Trump
21	District Judge	vacant	—	—	—	—	—	—
22	District Judge	vacant	—	—	—	—	—	—
12	Senior Judge	Richard Lesley Voorhees	Charlotte	1941	1988–2017	1991–1998	2017–present	Reagan
13	Senior Judge	Graham Calder Mullen	Charlotte	1940	1990–2005	1998–2005	2005–present	G.H.W. Bush
17	Senior Judge	Frank DeArmon Whitney	Charlotte	1959	2006–2024	2013–2020	2024–present	G.W. Bush

== District of North Dakota ==
As of January 13, 2020:

#	Title	Judge	Duty station	Born	Term of service			Appointed by
#	Title	Judge	Duty station	Born	Active	Chief	Senior	Appointed by
13	Chief Judge	Peter D. Welte	Fargo	1965	2019–present	2019–present	—	Trump
14	District Judge	Daniel M. Traynor	Bismarck	1970	2020–present	—	—	Trump
9	Senior Judge	Patrick Anthony Conmy	inactive	1934	1985–2000	1985–1992	2000–present	Reagan
11	Senior Judge	Daniel L. Hovland	Bismarck	1954	2002–2019	2002–2009; 2016–2019	2019–present	G.W. Bush

== District Court for the Northern Mariana Islands ==
As of April 16, 2024:

#	Title	Judge	Duty station	Born	Term of service			Appointed by
#	Title	Judge	Duty station	Born	Active	Chief	Senior	Appointed by
3	Chief Judge	Ramona Villagomez Manglona	Saipan	1967	2011–present	2011–present	—	Obama; Biden (reappointment)
2	Senior Judge	Alex R. Munson	inactive	1941	1988–2011	1988–2011	2011–present	Reagan; Clinton (reappointment)

== Northern District of Ohio ==
As of October 1, 2023:

#	Title	Judge	Duty station	Born	Term of service			Appointed by
#	Title	Judge	Duty station	Born	Active	Chief	Senior	Appointed by
52	Chief Judge	Sara Elizabeth Lioi	Akron	1960	2007–present	2023–present	—	G.W. Bush
49	District Judge	John R. Adams	Akron	1955	2003–present	—	—	G.W. Bush
53	District Judge	Benita Y. Pearson	Youngstown	1963	2010–present	—	—	Obama
54	District Judge	Jeffrey J. Helmick	Toledo	1960	2012–present	—	—	Obama
55	District Judge	Pamela Barker	Cleveland	1957	2019–present	—	—	Trump
56	District Judge	James R. Knepp II	Toledo	1964	2020–present	—	—	Trump
57	District Judge	J. Philip Calabrese	Cleveland	1971	2020–present	—	—	Trump
58	District Judge	Charles E. Fleming	Cleveland	1962	2022–present (Note: Despite identical commission dates, Judges Fleming, Ruiz and Brennan are organized chronologically by virtue of seniority of age.)	—	—	Biden
59	District Judge	David A. Ruiz	Cleveland	1973	2022–present	—	—	Biden
60	District Judge	Bridget M. Brennan	Cleveland	1974	2022–present	—	—	Biden
61	District Judge	vacant	—	—	—	—	—	—
40	Senior Judge	James G. Carr	Toledo	1940	1994–2010	2004–2010	2010–present	Clinton
41	Senior Judge	Solomon Oliver Jr.	Cleveland	1947	1994–2021	2010–2017	2021–present	Clinton
44	Senior Judge	Peter C. Economus	inactive	1943	1995–2009	—	2009–present	Clinton
45	Senior Judge	Donald C. Nugent	Cleveland	1948	1995–2017	—	2017–present	Clinton
46	Senior Judge	Patricia Anne Gaughan	Cleveland	1953	1995–2023	2017–2023	2023–present	Clinton
47	Senior Judge	James S. Gwin	Cleveland	1954	1997–2021	—	2021–present	Clinton
48	Senior Judge	Dan Polster	Cleveland	1951	1998–2021	—	2021–present	Clinton
50	Senior Judge	Christopher A. Boyko	Cleveland	1954	2005–2020	—	2020–present	G.W. Bush
51	Senior Judge	Jack Zouhary	Toledo	1951	2006–2019	—	2019–present	G.W. Bush

== Southern District of Ohio ==
As of September 7, 2024:

#	Title	Judge	Duty station	Born	Term of service			Appointed by
#	Title	Judge	Duty station	Born	Active	Chief	Senior	Appointed by
37	Chief Judge	Sarah D. Morrison	Columbus	1970	2019–present	2024–present	—	Trump
30	District Judge	Edmund A. Sargus Jr.	Columbus	1953	1996–present	2015–2019	—	Clinton
31	District Judge	Algenon L. Marbley	Columbus	1954	1997–present	2019–2024	—	Clinton
34	District Judge	Michael H. Watson	Columbus	1956	2004–present	—	—	G.W. Bush
38	District Judge	Douglas R. Cole	Cincinnati	1964	2019–present	—	—	Trump
39	District Judge	Matthew W. McFarland	Cincinnati	1967	2019–present	—	—	Trump
40	District Judge	Michael J. Newman	Dayton	1960	2020–present	—	—	Trump
41	District Judge	Jeffery P. Hopkins	Cincinnati	1960	2022–present	—	—	Biden
23	Senior Judge	Walter Herbert Rice	Dayton	1937	1980–2004	1996–2003	2004–present	Carter
25	Senior Judge	Herman Jacob Weber	Cincinnati	1927	1985–2002	—	2002–present	Reagan
26	Senior Judge	James L. Graham	Columbus	1939	1986–2004	2003–2004	2004–present	Reagan
28	Senior Judge	Sandra Beckwith	Cincinnati	1943	1992–2009	2004–2009	2009–present	G.H.W. Bush
29	Senior Judge	Susan J. Dlott	Cincinnati	1949	1995–2018	2009–2015	2018–present	Clinton
32	Senior Judge	Thomas M. Rose	Dayton	1948	2002–2017	—	2017–present	G.W. Bush
35	Senior Judge	Michael R. Barrett	Cincinnati	1951	2006–2019	—	2019–present	G.W. Bush
36	Senior Judge	Timothy Black	Cincinnati	1953	2010–2022	—	2022–present	Obama

== Eastern District of Oklahoma ==
As of May 27, 2020:

#	Title	Judge	Duty station	Born	Term of service			Appointed by
#	Title	Judge	Duty station	Born	Active	Chief	Senior	Appointed by
17	Chief Judge	Ronald A. White	Muskogee	1961	2003–present	2017–present	—	G.W. Bush
18	District Judge	John F. Heil III (Note: Jointly appointed to the Eastern, Northern, and Western Districts of Oklahoma.)	Muskogee	1968	2020–present	—	—	Trump
13	Senior Judge	Frank Howell Seay	inactive	1938	1979–2003	1980–1996	2003–present	Carter
16	Senior Judge	James H. Payne	inactive	1941	2001–2017	2002–2017	2017–present	G.W. Bush

== Northern District of Oklahoma ==
As of March 1, 2025:

#	Title	Judge	Duty station	Born	Term of service			Appointed by
#	Title	Judge	Duty station	Born	Active	Chief	Senior	Appointed by
20	Chief Judge	John F. Heil III (Note: Jointly appointed to the Eastern, Northern, and Western Districts of Oklahoma.)	Tulsa	1968	2020–present	2021–present	—	Trump
21	District Judge	Sara E. Hill	Tulsa	1977	2024–present	—	—	Biden
22	District Judge	John D. Russell	Tulsa	1963	2024–present	—	—	Biden
23	District Judge	vacant	—	—	—	—	—	—
13	Senior Judge	Terence C. Kern	Tulsa	1944	1994–2010	1996–2003	2010–present	Clinton
16	Senior Judge	Claire Eagan	Tulsa	1950	2001–2022	2005–2012	2022–present	G.W. Bush
17	Senior Judge	James H. Payne	inactive	1941	2001–2017	—	2017–present	G.W. Bush
18	Senior Judge	Gregory Kent Frizzell	Tulsa	1956	2007–2025	2012–2019	2025–present	G.W. Bush
19	Senior Judge	John E. Dowdell	inactive	1955	2012–2021	2019–2021	2021–present	Obama

== Western District of Oklahoma ==
As of May 27, 2020:

#	Title	Judge	Duty station	Born	Term of service			Appointed by
#	Title	Judge	Duty station	Born	Active	Chief	Senior	Appointed by
24	Chief Judge	Timothy D. DeGiusti	Oklahoma City	1962	2007–present	2019–present	—	G.W. Bush
25	District Judge	Scott L. Palk	Oklahoma City	1967	2017–present	—	—	Trump
26	District Judge	Charles Barnes Goodwin	Oklahoma City	1970	2018–present	—	—	Trump
27	District Judge	Patrick Wyrick	Oklahoma City	1981	2019–present	—	—	Trump
28	District Judge	Jodi W. Dishman	Oklahoma City	1979	2019–present	—	—	Trump
29	District Judge	Bernard M. Jones	Oklahoma City	1979	2019–present	—	—	Trump
30	District Judge	John F. Heil III (Note: Jointly appointed to the Eastern, Northern, and Western Districts of Oklahoma.)	none (Note: Judge Heil maintains chambers only in the Eastern and Northern Districts.)	1968	2020–present	—	—	Trump
14	Senior Judge	David Lynn Russell	Oklahoma City	1942	1981–2013 (Note: From 1981 to 1990, Judge Russell was jointly appointed to the Eastern, Northern, and Western Districts of Oklahoma.)	1994–2001	2013–present	Reagan
15	Senior Judge	Wayne Alley	inactive	1932	1985–1999	—	1999–present	Reagan
17	Senior Judge	Robin J. Cauthron	inactive	1950	1991–2015	2001–2008	2015–present	G.H.W. Bush
18	Senior Judge	Timothy D. Leonard	inactive	1940	1992–2006	—	2006–present	G.H.W. Bush
20	Senior Judge	Vicki Miles-LaGrange	inactive	1953	1994–2018	2008–2015	2018–present	Clinton
21	Senior Judge	James H. Payne	none (Note: Judge Payne maintains chambers only in the Eastern and Northern Districts.)	1941	2001–2017	—	2017–present	G.W. Bush
22	Senior Judge	Stephen P. Friot	Oklahoma City	1947	2001–2014	—	2014–present	G.W. Bush
23	Senior Judge	Joe L. Heaton	Oklahoma City	1951	2001–2019	2015–2019	2019–present	G.W. Bush

== District of Oregon ==
As of March 29, 2025:

#	Title	Judge	Duty station	Born	Term of service			Appointed by
#	Title	Judge	Duty station	Born	Active	Chief	Senior	Appointed by
29	Chief Judge	Michael J. McShane	Eugene	1961	2013–present	2024–present	—	Obama
28	District Judge	Michael H. Simon	Portland	1956	2011–present	—	—	Obama
30	District Judge	Karin Immergut	Portland	1960	2019–present	—	—	Trump
31	District Judge	Adrienne Nelson	Portland	1967	2023–present	—	—	Biden
32	District Judge	Amy M. Baggio	Portland	1973	2024–present	—	—	Biden
33	District Judge	Mustafa T. Kasubhai	Eugene	1970	2024–present	—	—	Biden
22	Senior Judge	Ancer L. Haggerty	inactive	1944	1994–2009	2002–2009	2009–present	Clinton
23	Senior Judge	Ann Aiken	Eugene	1951	1998–2023	2009–2016	2023–present	Clinton
25	Senior Judge	Anna J. Brown	Portland	1952	1999–2017	—	2017–present	Clinton
26	Senior Judge	Michael W. Mosman	Portland	1956	2003–2021	2016–2019	2021–present	G.W. Bush
27	Senior Judge	Marco A. Hernandez	Portland	1957	2011–2024	2019–2024	2024–present	Obama

== Eastern District of Pennsylvania ==
As of August 2, 2025:

#	Title	Judge	Duty station	Born	Term of service			Appointed by
#	Title	Judge	Duty station	Born	Active	Chief	Senior	Appointed by
97	Chief Judge	Wendy Beetlestone	Philadelphia	1961	2014–present	2025–present	—	Obama
86	District Judge	Paul S. Diamond	Philadelphia	1953	2004–present	—	—	G.W. Bush
87	District Judge	Juan Ramon Sánchez	Philadelphia	1955	2004–present	2018–2024	—	G.W. Bush
91	District Judge	Mitchell S. Goldberg	Philadelphia	1959	2008–present	2024–2025	—	G.W. Bush
92	District Judge	Nitza Quiñones Alejandro	Philadelphia	1951	2013–present	—	—	Obama
94	District Judge	Jeffrey L. Schmehl	Reading; Philadelphia	1955	2013–present	—	—	Obama
95	District Judge	Gerald A. McHugh Jr.	Philadelphia	1954	2014–present	—	—	Obama
98	District Judge	Mark A. Kearney	Philadelphia	1962	2014–present	—	—	Obama
99	District Judge	Jerry Pappert	Philadelphia	1963	2014–present	—	—	Obama
100	District Judge	Joseph F. Leeson Jr.	Allentown; Philadelphia	1955	2014–present	—	—	Obama
101	District Judge	Chad F. Kenney	Philadelphia	1955	2018–present	—	—	Trump
102	District Judge	Joshua Wolson	Philadelphia	1974	2019–present	—	—	Trump
103	District Judge	John Milton Younge	Philadelphia	1955	2019–present	—	—	Trump
104	District Judge	Karen S. Marston	Philadelphia	1968	2019–present	—	—	Trump
105	District Judge	John M. Gallagher	Allentown	1966	2019–present	—	—	Trump
106	District Judge	Mia Roberts Perez	Philadelphia	1981	2022–present	—	—	Biden
107	District Judge	Kelley B. Hodge	Philadelphia	1971	2022–present (Note: By virtue of her seniority of age, Judge Hodge holds seniority over Judge Murphy despite their identical commission dates.)	—	—	Biden
108	District Judge	John Frank Murphy	Philadelphia	1977	2022–present	—	—	Biden
109	District Judge	Kai Scott	Philadelphia	1970	2023–present	—	—	Biden
110	District Judge	Mary Kay Costello	Philadelphia	1968	2024–present	—	—	Biden
111	District Judge	Catherine Henry	Easton; Philadelphia	1969	2024–present	—	—	Biden
112	District Judge	Gail A. Weilheimer	Philadelphia	1970	2025–present	—	—	Biden
58	Senior Judge	Robert F. Kelly	inactive	1935	1987–2001	—	2001–present	Reagan
62	Senior Judge	Jan E. DuBois	inactive	1931	1988–2002	—	2002–present	Reagan
65	Senior Judge	Ronald L. Buckwalter	inactive	1936	1990–2003	—	2003–present	G.H.W. Bush
66	Senior Judge	Harvey Bartle III	Philadelphia	1941	1991–2011	2006–2011	2011–present	G.H.W. Bush
68	Senior Judge	William H. Yohn Jr.	inactive	1935	1991–2003	—	2003–present	G.H.W. Bush
69	Senior Judge	John R. Padova	Philadelphia	1935	1992–2008	—	2008–present	G.H.W. Bush
72	Senior Judge	Anita B. Brody	Philadelphia	1935	1992–2009	—	2009–present	G.H.W. Bush
76	Senior Judge	Petrese B. Tucker	inactive	1951	2000–2021	2013–2017	2021–present	Clinton
78	Senior Judge	Richard Barclay Surrick	Philadelphia	1937	2000–2011	—	2011–present	Clinton
79	Senior Judge	Legrome D. Davis	inactive	1952	2002–2017	—	2017–present	G.W. Bush
80	Senior Judge	Cynthia M. Rufe	Philadelphia	1948	2002–2021	—	2021–present	G.W. Bush
81	Senior Judge	Michael Baylson	Philadelphia	1939	2002–2012	—	2012–present	G.W. Bush
82	Senior Judge	Timothy J. Savage	Philadelphia	1946	2002–2021	—	2021–present	G.W. Bush
89	Senior Judge	Joel Harvey Slomsky	Philadelphia	1946	2008–2018	—	2018–present	G.W. Bush
90	Senior Judge	C. Darnell Jones II	inactive	1949	2008–2021	—	2021–present	G.W. Bush

== Middle District of Pennsylvania ==
As of January 17, 2025:

#	Title	Judge	Duty station	Born	Term of service			Appointed by
#	Title	Judge	Duty station	Born	Active	Chief	Senior	Appointed by
24	Chief Judge	Matthew W. Brann	Williamsport	1965	2012–present	2021–present	—	Obama
25	District Judge	Jennifer P. Wilson	Harrisburg	1975	2019–present	—	—	Trump
26	District Judge	Julia K. Munley	Scranton	1965	2023–present	—	—	Biden
27	District Judge	Karoline Mehalchick	Scranton	1976	2024–present	—	—	Biden
28	District Judge	Joseph F. Saporito Jr.	Wilkes-Barre	1960	2024–present	—	—	Biden
29	District Judge	Keli M. Neary	Harrisburg	1981	2025–present	—	—	Biden
18	Senior Judge	Yvette Kane	Harrisburg	1953	1998–2018	2006–2013	2018–present	Clinton
22	Senior Judge	Robert D. Mariani	Scranton	1950	2011–2022	—	2022–present	Obama
23	Senior Judge	Malachy E. Mannion	Scranton	1953	2012–2024	—	2024–present	Obama

== Western District of Pennsylvania ==
As of May 30, 2025:

#	Title	Judge	Duty station	Born	Term of service			Appointed by
#	Title	Judge	Duty station	Born	Active	Chief	Senior	Appointed by
56	Chief Judge	Mark R. Hornak	Pittsburgh	1956	2011–present	2018–present	—	Obama
57	District Judge	Cathy Bissoon	Pittsburgh	1968	2011–present	—	—	Obama
58	District Judge	Susan Paradise Baxter	Erie	1956	2018–present	—	—	Trump
59	District Judge	Marilyn Horan	Pittsburgh	1954	2018–present	—	—	Trump
61	District Judge	Nicholas Ranjan	Pittsburgh	1978	2019–present	—	—	Trump
62	District Judge	William S. Stickman IV	Pittsburgh	1979	2019–present	—	—	Trump
63	District Judge	Stephanie L. Haines	Johnstown	1969	2019–present	—	—	Trump
64	District Judge	Robert J. Colville	Pittsburgh	1965	2019–present	—	—	Trump
65	District Judge	W. Scott Hardy	Pittsburgh	1971	2020–present	—	—	Trump
66	District Judge	Christy C. Wiegand	Pittsburgh	1975	2020–present	—	—	Trump
45	Senior Judge	Donetta Ambrose	inactive	1945	1993–2010	2002–2009	2010–present	Clinton
49	Senior Judge	Joy Flowers Conti	Pittsburgh	1948	2002–2018	2013–2018	2018–present	G.W. Bush
50	Senior Judge	David S. Cercone	Pittsburgh; Erie	1952	2002–2017	—	2017–present	G.W. Bush
52	Senior Judge	Arthur J. Schwab	Pittsburgh	1946	2002–2018	—	2018–present	G.W. Bush
55	Senior Judge	Nora Barry Fischer	Pittsburgh	1951	2007–2019	—	2019–present	G.W. Bush

== District of Puerto Rico ==
As of January 2, 2024:

#	Title	Judge	Duty station	Born	Term of service			Appointed by
#	Title	Judge	Duty station	Born	Active	Chief	Senior	Appointed by
20	Chief Judge	Raúl M. Arias-Marxuach	San Juan	1967	2019–present	2021–present	—	Trump
16	District Judge	Aida Delgado-Colón	San Juan	1955	2006–present	2011–2018	—	G.W. Bush
19	District Judge	Pedro Delgado Hernández	San Juan	1956	2014–present	—	—	Obama
21	District Judge	Silvia Carreño-Coll	San Juan	1963	2020–present	—	—	Trump
22	District Judge	María Antongiorgi-Jordán	San Juan	1967	2022–present	—	—	Biden
23	District Judge	Camille Vélez-Rivé	San Juan	1968	2022–present	—	—	Biden
24	District Judge	Gina R. Méndez-Miró	San Juan	1974	2023–present	—	—	Biden
15	Senior Judge	Jay A. García-Gregory	San Juan	1944	2000–2018	—	2018–present	Clinton
18	Senior Judge	Francisco Besosa	San Juan	1949	2006–2022	—	2022–present	G.W. Bush

== District of Rhode Island ==
As of January 2, 2025:

#	Title	Judge	Duty station	Born	Term of service			Appointed by
#	Title	Judge	Duty station	Born	Active	Chief	Senior	Appointed by
23	Chief Judge	John J. McConnell Jr.	Providence	1958	2011–present	2019–present	—	Obama
24	District Judge	Mary S. McElroy	Providence	1965	2019–present	—	—	Trump
25	District Judge	Melissa R. DuBose	Providence	1968	2025–present	—	—	Biden
21	Senior Judge	Mary M. Lisi	inactive	1950	1994–2015	2006–2013	2015–present	Clinton
22	Senior Judge	William E. Smith	Providence	1959	2002–2025	2013–2019	2025–present	G.W. Bush

== District of South Carolina ==
As of June 4, 2024:

#	Title	Judge	Duty station	Born	Term of service			Appointed by
#	Title	Judge	Duty station	Born	Active	Chief	Senior	Appointed by
38	Chief Judge	Timothy M. Cain	Anderson	1961	2011–present	2024–present	—	Obama
26	District Judge	David C. Norton	Charleston	1946	1990–present	2007–2012	—	G.H.W. Bush
36	District Judge	Richard Gergel	Charleston	1954	2010–present	—	—	Obama
39	District Judge	Mary Geiger Lewis	Columbia	1958	2012–present	—	—	Obama
40	District Judge	Bruce Howe Hendricks	Charleston	1957	2014–present	—	—	Obama
41	District Judge	Donald C. Coggins Jr.	Spartanburg	1959	2017–present	—	—	Trump
43	District Judge	Sherri Lydon	Columbia	1962	2019–present	—	—	Trump
44	District Judge	Joseph Dawson III	Florence	1970	2020–present	—	—	Trump
45	District Judge	Jacquelyn D. Austin	Greenville	1966	2024–present	—	—	Biden
46	District Judge	vacant	—	—	—	—	—	—
25	Senior Judge	Joseph F. Anderson	Columbia	1949	1986–2014	2000–2007	2014–present	Reagan
28	Senior Judge	Henry Michael Herlong Jr.	Greenville	1944	1991–2009	—	2009–present	G.H.W. Bush
30	Senior Judge	Cameron McGowan Currie	Columbia	1948	1994–2013	—	2013–present	Clinton
33	Senior Judge	Terry L. Wooten	Columbia	1954	2001–2019	2013–2019	2019–present	G.W. Bush
35	Senior Judge	Robert Bryan Harwell	Florence	1959	2004–2024	2019–2024	2024–present	G.W. Bush

== District of South Dakota ==
As of June 4, 2024:

#	Title	Judge	Duty station	Born	Term of service			Appointed by
#	Title	Judge	Duty station	Born	Active	Chief	Senior	Appointed by
16	Chief Judge	Roberto Lange	Sioux Falls	1963	2009–present	2020–present	—	Obama
17	District Judge	Eric Schulte	Pierre	1972	2024–present	—	—	Biden
18	District Judge	Camela C. Theeler	Rapid City	1975	2024–present	—	—	Biden
12	Senior Judge	Lawrence L. Piersol	Sioux Falls	1940	1993–2009	1999–2005	2009–present	Clinton
13	Senior Judge	Charles B. Kornmann	Aberdeen	1937	1995–2008	—	2008–present	Clinton
14	Senior Judge	Karen Schreier	Sioux Falls	1956	1999–2024	2006–2013	2024–present	Clinton

== Eastern District of Tennessee ==
As of February 27, 2024:

#	Title	Judge	Duty station	Born	Term of service			Appointed by
#	Title	Judge	Duty station	Born	Active	Chief	Senior	Appointed by
25	Chief Judge	Travis R. McDonough	Chattanooga	1972	2015–present	2020–present	—	Obama
21	District Judge	Thomas A. Varlan	Knoxville	1956	2003–present	2012–2019	—	G.W. Bush
26	District Judge	Clifton L. Corker	Greeneville	1967	2019–present	—	—	Trump
27	District Judge	Charles E. Atchley Jr.	Chattanooga	1966	2020–present	—	—	Trump
28	District Judge	Katherine A. Crytzer	Knoxville	1984	2020–present	—	—	Trump
17	Senior Judge	Robert Allan Edgar	inactive	1940	1985–2005	1998–2005	2005–present	Reagan
19	Senior Judge	Curtis Lynn Collier	Chattanooga	1949	1995–2014	2005–2012	2014–present	Clinton
20	Senior Judge	Thomas W. Phillips	Knoxville	1943	2002–2013	—	2013–present	G.W. Bush
22	Senior Judge	J. Ronnie Greer	Greeneville	1952	2003–2018	—	2018–present	G.W. Bush

== Middle District of Tennessee ==
As of April 15, 2024:

#	Title	Judge	Duty station	Born	Term of service			Appointed by
#	Title	Judge	Duty station	Born	Active	Chief	Senior	Appointed by
23	Chief Judge	William L. Campbell Jr.	Nashville	1969	2018–present	2024–present	—	Trump
19	District Judge	Aleta Arthur Trauger	Nashville	1945	1998–present	—	—	Clinton
22	District Judge	Waverly D. Crenshaw Jr.	Nashville	1956	2016–present	2017–2024	—	Obama
24	District Judge	Eli J. Richardson	Nashville	1967	2018–present	—	—	Trump

== Western District of Tennessee ==
As of January 20, 2023:

#	Title	Judge	Duty station	Born	Term of service			Appointed by
#	Title	Judge	Duty station	Born	Active	Chief	Senior	Appointed by
24	Chief Judge	Sheryl H. Lipman	Memphis	1963	2014–present	2023–present	—	Obama
22	District Judge	S. Thomas Anderson	Jackson	1953	2008–present	2017–2023	—	G.W. Bush
25	District Judge	Tommy Parker	Memphis	1963	2018–present	—	—	Trump
26	District Judge	Mark Norris	Memphis	1955	2018–present	—	—	Trump
27	District Judge	vacant	—	—	—	—	—	—
16	Senior Judge	James Dale Todd	inactive	1943	1985–2008	2001–2007	2008–present	Reagan
18	Senior Judge	Jon Phipps McCalla	Memphis	1947	1992–2013	2008–2013	2013–2025	G.H.W. Bush
20	Senior Judge	Samuel H. Mays Jr.	Memphis	1948	2002–2015	—	2015–present	G.W. Bush
21	Senior Judge	J. Daniel Breen	Jackson	1950	2003–2017	2013–2017	2017–present	G.W. Bush
23	Senior Judge	John T. Fowlkes Jr.	Memphis	1951	2012–2022	—	2022–present	Obama

== Eastern District of Texas ==
As of March 1, 2025:

#	Title	Judge	Duty station	Born	Term of service			Appointed by
#	Title	Judge	Duty station	Born	Active	Chief	Senior	Appointed by
28	Chief Judge	Amos Mazzant	Sherman	1965	2014–present	2025–present	—	Obama
25	District Judge	Marcia A. Crone	Beaumont	1952	2003–present	—	—	G.W. Bush
27	District Judge	J. Rodney Gilstrap	Marshall	1957	2011–present	2018–2025	—	Obama
29	District Judge	Robert W. Schroeder III	Texarkana	1966	2014–present	—	—	Obama
30	District Judge	Jeremy Kernodle	Tyler	1976	2018–present	—	—	Trump
31	District Judge	J. Campbell Barker	Tyler	1980	2019–present	—	—	Trump
32	District Judge	Michael J. Truncale	Beaumont	1957	2019–present	—	—	Trump
33	District Judge	Sean D. Jordan	Plano	1965	2019–present	—	—	Trump
18	Senior Judge	Richard A. Schell	Plano	1950	1988–2015	1994–2001	2015–present	Reagan
24	Senior Judge	Ron Clark	Beaumont	1953	2002–2018	2015–2018	2018–present	G.W. Bush

== Northern District of Texas ==
As of September 17, 2025:

#	Title	Judge	Duty station	Born	Term of service			Appointed by
#	Title	Judge	Duty station	Born	Active	Chief	Senior	Appointed by
34	Chief Judge	Reed O'Connor	Fort Worth	1965	2007–present	2025–present	—	G.W. Bush
29	District Judge	Sam A. Lindsay	Dallas	1951	1998–present	—	—	Clinton
32	District Judge	James E. Kinkeade	Dallas	1951	2002–present	—	—	G.W. Bush
33	District Judge	Jane J. Boyle	Dallas	1954	2004–present	—	—	G.W. Bush
35	District Judge	Karen Gren Scholer	Dallas	1957	2018–present	—	—	Trump
36	District Judge	Matthew Kacsmaryk	Amarillo	1977	2019–present	—	—	Trump
37	District Judge	Mark T. Pittman	Fort Worth	1975	2019–present	—	—	Trump
38	District Judge	Brantley Starr	Dallas	1979	2019–present	—	—	Trump
39	District Judge	James Wesley Hendrix	Lubbock	1977	2019–present	—	—	Trump
40	District Judge	Ada Brown	Dallas	1974	2019–present	—	—	Trump
41	District Judge	vacant	—	—	—	—	—	—
42	District Judge	vacant	—	—	—	—	—	—
21	Senior Judge	A. Joe Fish	Dallas	1942	1983–2007	2002–2007	2007–present	Reagan
22	Senior Judge	Robert B. Maloney	inactive	1933	1985–2000	—	2000–present	Reagan
23	Senior Judge	Sidney A. Fitzwater	Dallas	1953	1986–2018	2007–2014	2018–present	Reagan
24	Senior Judge	Samuel Ray Cummings	Lubbock	1944	1987–2014	—	2014–present	Reagan
27	Senior Judge	Terry R. Means	Fort Worth	1948	1991–2013	—	2013–present	G.H.W. Bush
31	Senior Judge	David C. Godbey	Dallas	1957	2002–2025	2022–2025	2025–present	G.W. Bush

== Southern District of Texas ==
As of May 21, 2025:

#	Title	Judge	Duty station	Born	Term of service			Appointed by
#	Title	Judge	Duty station	Born	Active	Chief	Senior	Appointed by
40	Chief Judge	Randy Crane	McAllen	1965	2002–present	2022–present	—	G.W. Bush
39	District Judge	Keith P. Ellison	Houston	1950	1999–present	—	—	Clinton
44	District Judge	Diana Saldaña	Laredo	1971	2011–present	—	—	Obama
45	District Judge	Nelva Gonzales Ramos	Corpus Christi	1965	2011–present	—	—	Obama
46	District Judge	Marina Garcia Marmolejo	Laredo	1971	2011–present	—	—	Obama
48	District Judge	Alfred H. Bennett	Houston	1965	2015–present	—	—	Obama
49	District Judge	George C. Hanks Jr.	Houston	1964	2015–present	—	—	Obama
50	District Judge	Rolando Olvera	Brownsville	1963	2015–present	—	—	Obama
51	District Judge	Fernando Rodriguez Jr.	Brownsville	1969	2018–present	—	—	Trump
52	District Judge	David S. Morales	Corpus Christi	1968	2019–present	—	—	Trump
53	District Judge	Jeff Brown	Galveston	1970	2019–present	—	—	Trump
54	District Judge	Charles R. Eskridge III	Houston	1963	2019–present	—	—	Trump
55	District Judge	Drew B. Tipton	Houston	1967	2020–present	—	—	Trump
56	District Judge	John A. Kazen	Laredo	1964	2024–present	—	—	Biden
57	District Judge	vacant	—	—	—	—	—	—
58	District Judge	vacant	—	—	—	—	—	—
59	District Judge	vacant	—	—	—	—	—	—
60	District Judge	vacant	—	—	—	—	—	—
61	District Judge	vacant	—	—	—	—	—	—
24	Senior Judge	Hayden Wilson Head Jr.	inactive	1944	1981–2009	2003–2009	2009–present	Reagan
25	Senior Judge	Ricardo Hinojosa	McAllen	1950	1983–2025	2009–2016	2025–present	Reagan
26	Senior Judge	Lynn Hughes	inactive	1941	1985–2023	—	2023–present	Reagan
27	Senior Judge	David Hittner	Houston	1939	1986–2004	—	2004–present	Reagan
28	Senior Judge	Kenneth M. Hoyt	Houston	1948	1988–2013	—	2013–present	Reagan
29	Senior Judge	Sim Lake	Houston	1944	1988–2019	—	2019–present	Reagan
30	Senior Judge	Melinda Harmon	inactive	1946	1989–2018	—	2018–present	G.H.W. Bush
31	Senior Judge	John David Rainey	Victoria	1945	1990–2010	—	2010–present	G.H.W. Bush
33	Senior Judge	Ewing Werlein Jr.	Houston	1936	1992–2006	—	2006–present	G.H.W. Bush
34	Senior Judge	Lee H. Rosenthal	Houston	1952	1992–2024	2016–2022	2024–present	G.H.W. Bush
35	Senior Judge	Janis Graham Jack	Corpus Christi	1946	1994–2011	—	2011–present	Clinton
38	Senior Judge	Hilda G. Tagle	inactive	1946	1998–2012	—	2012–present	Clinton
41	Senior Judge	Andrew Hanen	Houston	1953	2002–2025	—	2025–present	G.W. Bush
42	Senior Judge	Micaela Alvarez	McAllen	1958	2004–2023	—	2023–present	G.W. Bush
43	Senior Judge	Gray H. Miller	Houston	1948	2006–2018	—	2018–present	G.W. Bush

== Western District of Texas ==
As of April 9, 2024:

#	Title	Judge	Duty station	Born	Term of service			Appointed by
#	Title	Judge	Duty station	Born	Active	Chief	Senior	Appointed by
32	Chief Judge	Alia Moses	Del Rio	1962	2002–present	2022–present	—	G.W. Bush
27	District Judge	Samuel Frederick Biery Jr.	San Antonio	1947	1994–present	2010–2015	—	Clinton
29	District Judge	Orlando Luis Garcia	San Antonio	1952	1994–present	2016–2022	—	Clinton
35	District Judge	Kathleen Cardone	El Paso	1953	2003–present	—	—	G.W. Bush
37	District Judge	Xavier Rodriguez	San Antonio	1961	2003–present	—	—	G.W. Bush
39	District Judge	Robert L. Pitman	Austin	1962	2014–present	—	—	Obama
40	District Judge	David Counts	Midland; Pecos	1961	2018–present	—	—	Trump
41	District Judge	Alan Albright	Waco; Austin	1959	2018–present	—	—	Trump
42	District Judge	Jason K. Pulliam	San Antonio	1971	2019–present	—	—	Trump
43	District Judge	Leon Schydlower	El Paso	1971	2024–present	—	—	Biden
44	District Judge	Ernesto Gonzalez	Del Rio	1962	2024–present	—	—	Biden
45	District Judge	vacant	—	—	—	—	—	—
46	District Judge	vacant	—	—	—	—	—	—
22	Senior Judge	James Robertson Nowlin	Austin	1937	1981–2003	1999–2003	2003–present	Reagan
26	Senior Judge	Sam Sparks	inactive	1939	1991–2017	—	2017–present	G.H.W. Bush
30	Senior Judge	David Briones	El Paso	1943	1994–2009	—	2009–present	Clinton
33	Senior Judge	Robert A. Junell	inactive	1947	2003–2015	—	2015–present	G.W. Bush
36	Senior Judge	Frank Montalvo	inactive	1956	2003–2022	—	2022–present	G.W. Bush
38	Senior Judge	David C. Guaderrama	El Paso	1954	2012–2023	—	2023–present	Obama

== District of Utah ==
As of April 12, 2024:

#	Title	Judge	Duty station	Born	Term of service			Appointed by
#	Title	Judge	Duty station	Born	Active	Chief	Senior	Appointed by
17	Chief Judge	Robert J. Shelby	Salt Lake City	1970	2012–present	2018–present	—	Obama
18	District Judge	Jill Parrish	Salt Lake City	1961	2015–present	—	—	Obama
19	District Judge	Howard C. Nielson Jr.	Salt Lake City	1968	2019–present	—	—	Trump
20	District Judge	David Barlow	Salt Lake City	1971	2020–present	—	—	Trump
21	District Judge	Ann Marie McIff Allen	St. George; Salt Lake City	1972	2024–present	—	—	Biden
9	Senior Judge	David Sam	Salt Lake City	1933	1985–1999	1997–1999	1999–present	Reagan
11	Senior Judge	Tena Campbell	Salt Lake City	1944	1995–2011	2006–2011	2011–present	Clinton
12	Senior Judge	Dale A. Kimball	Salt Lake City	1939	1997–2009	—	2009–present	Clinton
13	Senior Judge	Ted Stewart	Salt Lake City	1948	1999–2014	2011–2014	2014–present	Clinton
15	Senior Judge	Clark Waddoups	Salt Lake City	1946	2008–2019	—	2019–present	G.W. Bush
16	Senior Judge	David Nuffer	St. George	1952	2012–2022	2014–2018	2022–present	Obama

== District of Vermont ==
As of September 12, 2024:

#	Title	Judge	Duty station	Born	Term of service			Appointed by
#	Title	Judge	Duty station	Born	Active	Chief	Senior	Appointed by
19	Chief Judge	Christina Reiss	Burlington	1962	2009–present	2010–2017; 2024–present	—	Obama
21	District Judge	Mary Kay Lanthier	Rutland	1971	2024–present	—	—	Biden
17	Senior Judge	John Garvan Murtha	inactive	1941	1995–2009	1995–2002	2009–present	Clinton
18	Senior Judge	William K. Sessions III	Burlington	1947	1995–2014	2002–2010	2014–present	Clinton
20	Senior Judge	Geoffrey W. Crawford	Burlington	1954	2014–2024	2017–2024	2024–present	Obama

== District Court of the Virgin Islands ==
As of February 15, 2025:

#	Title	Judge	Duty station	Born	Term of service			Appointed by
#	Title	Judge	Duty station	Born	Active	Chief	Senior	Appointed by
12	Chief Judge	Robert A. Molloy	Saint Croix	1975	2020–present	2021–present	—	Trump
13	District Judge	vacant	—	—	—	—	—	—
10	Senior Judge	Curtis V. Gómez	inactive	1953	2005–2020	2005–2013	2020–present	G.W. Bush
11	Senior Judge	Wilma A. Lewis	Saint Croix	1956	2011–2025	2013–2021	2025–present	Obama

== Eastern District of Virginia ==
As of July 30, 2025:

#	Title	Judge	Duty station	Born	Term of service			Appointed by
#	Title	Judge	Duty station	Born	Active	Chief	Senior	Appointed by
40	Chief Judge	Mark Steven Davis	Norfolk; Newport News	1962	2008–present	2018–present	—	G.W. Bush
33	District Judge	Leonie Brinkema	Alexandria	1944	1993–present	—	—	Clinton
43	District Judge	Arenda Wright Allen	Norfolk; Newport News	1960	2011–present	—	—	Obama
44	District Judge	M. Hannah Lauck	Richmond	1963	2014–present	—	—	Obama
45	District Judge	Rossie D. Alston Jr.	Alexandria	1957	2019–present	—	—	Trump
46	District Judge	David J. Novak	Richmond	1961	2019–present	—	—	Trump
47	District Judge	Roderick C. Young	Richmond	1966	2020–present	—	—	Trump
48	District Judge	Patricia Tolliver Giles	Alexandria	1973	2021–present	—	—	Biden
49	District Judge	Michael S. Nachmanoff	Alexandria	1968	2021–present	—	—	Biden
50	District Judge	Elizabeth Hanes	Norfolk; Newport News	1978	2022–present	—	—	Biden
51	District Judge	Jamar K. Walker	Norfolk; Newport News	1986	2023–present	—	—	Biden
27	Senior Judge	Claude M. Hilton	Alexandria	1940	1985–2005	1997–2004	2005–present	Reagan
30	Senior Judge	Rebecca Beach Smith	Norfolk; Newport News	1949	1989–2019	2011–2018	2019–present	G.H.W. Bush
32	Senior Judge	Robert E. Payne	Richmond	1941	1992–2007	—	2007–present	G.H.W. Bush
34	Senior Judge	Raymond Alvin Jackson	Norfolk; Newport News	1949	1993–2021	—	2021–present	Clinton
37	Senior Judge	Henry E. Hudson	Richmond	1947	2002–2018	—	2018–present	G.W. Bush
41	Senior Judge	Anthony Trenga	Alexandria	1949	2008–2021	—	2021–present	G.W. Bush
42	Senior Judge	John A. Gibney Jr.	Richmond	1951	2010–2021	—	2021–present	Obama

== Western District of Virginia ==
As of July 8, 2024:

#	Title	Judge	Duty station	Born	Term of service			Appointed by
#	Title	Judge	Duty station	Born	Active	Chief	Senior	Appointed by
27	Chief Judge	Elizabeth K. Dillon	Roanoke	1960	2014–present	2024–present	—	Obama
28	District Judge	Thomas T. Cullen	Roanoke	1977	2020–present	—	—	Trump
29	District Judge	Robert S. Ballou	Roanoke	1962	2023–present	—	—	Biden
30	District Judge	Jasmine H. Yoon	Charlottesville	1980	2024–present	—	—	Biden
23	Senior Judge	James Parker Jones	Abingdon	1940	1996–2021	2004–2010	2021–present	Clinton
24	Senior Judge	Norman K. Moon	Lynchburg	1936	1997–2010	—	2010–present	Clinton
26	Senior Judge	Michael F. Urbanski	Roanoke	1956	2011–2024	2017–2024	2024–present	Obama

== Eastern District of Washington ==
As of December 9, 2024:

#	Title	Judge	Duty station	Born	Term of service			Appointed by
#	Title	Judge	Duty station	Born	Active	Chief	Senior	Appointed by
22	Chief Judge	Stanley Bastian	Yakima	1958	2014–present	2020–present	—	Obama
21	District Judge	Thomas O. Rice	Spokane	1960	2012–present	2016–2020	—	Obama
24	District Judge	Mary Dimke	Richland	1977	2021–present	—	—	Biden
25	District Judge	Rebecca L. Pennell	Spokane	1971	2024–present	—	—	Biden
15	Senior Judge	William Fremming Nielsen	inactive	1934	1991–2003	1995–2000	2003–present	G.H.W. Bush
17	Senior Judge	Robert H. Whaley	Spokane	1943	1995–2009	2005–2009	2009–present	Clinton
18	Senior Judge	Edward F. Shea	Richland	1942	1998–2012	—	2012–present	Clinton
19	Senior Judge	Lonny R. Suko	Yakima	1943	2003–2013	2009–2011	2013–present	G.W. Bush
20	Senior Judge	Rosanna M. Peterson	Spokane	1951	2010–2021	2011–2016	2021–present	Obama

== Western District of Washington ==
As of July 18, 2023:

#	Title	Judge	Duty station	Born	Term of service			Appointed by
#	Title	Judge	Duty station	Born	Active	Chief	Senior	Appointed by
31	Chief Judge	David Estudillo	Tacoma	1973	2021–present	2022–present	—	Biden
32	District Judge	Tana Lin	Seattle	1966	2021–present	—	—	Biden
33	District Judge	Lauren J. King	Seattle	1982	2021–present	—	—	Biden
34	District Judge	John H. Chun	Seattle	1970	2022–present	—	—	Biden
35	District Judge	Jamal Whitehead	Seattle	1979	2023–present	—	—	Biden
36	District Judge	Kymberly Evanson	Seattle	1977	2023–present	—	—	Biden
37	District Judge	Tiffany Cartwright	Tacoma	1985	2023–present	—	—	Biden
17	Senior Judge	Barbara Jacobs Rothstein	Washington, D.C. (Note: Since taking senior status, Judge Rothstein has sat with the United States District Court for the District of Columbia.)	1939	1980–2011	1987–1994	2011–present	Carter
18	Senior Judge	John C. Coughenour	Seattle	1941	1981–2006	1997–2004	2006–present	Reagan
19	Senior Judge	Carolyn R. Dimmick	Seattle	1929	1985–1997	1994–1997	1997–present	Reagan
20	Senior Judge	Robert Jensen Bryan	Tacoma	1934	1986–2000	—	2000–present	Reagan
22	Senior Judge	Thomas Samuel Zilly	Seattle	1935	1988–2004	—	2004–present	Reagan
24	Senior Judge	Robert S. Lasnik	Seattle	1951	1998–2016	2004–2011	2016–present	Clinton
25	Senior Judge	Marsha J. Pechman	Seattle	1951	1999–2016	2011–2016	2016–present	Clinton
27	Senior Judge	Ricardo S. Martinez	Seattle	1951	2004–2022	2016–2022	2022–present	G.W. Bush
28	Senior Judge	James Robart	Seattle	1947	2004–2016	—	2016–present	G.W. Bush
29	Senior Judge	Benjamin Settle	Tacoma	1947	2007–2020	—	2020–present	G.W. Bush
30	Senior Judge	Richard A. Jones	Seattle	1950	2007–2022	—	2022–present	G.W. Bush

== Northern District of West Virginia ==
As of March 19, 2022:

#	Title	Judge	Duty station	Born	Term of service			Appointed by
#	Title	Judge	Duty station	Born	Active	Chief	Senior	Appointed by
16	Chief Judge	Tom Kleeh	Clarksburg; Elkins	1974	2018–present	2022–present	—	Trump
14	District Judge	John P. Bailey	Wheeling	1951	2007–present	2008–2015	—	G.W. Bush
15	District Judge	Gina M. Groh	Martinsburg	1964	2012–present	2015–2022	—	Obama
11	Senior Judge	Frederick Pfarr Stamp Jr.	inactive	1934	1990–2006	1994–2001	2006–present	G.H.W. Bush
12	Senior Judge	Irene Patricia Murphy Keeley	inactive	1944	1992–2017	2001–2008	2017–present	G.H.W. Bush

== Southern District of West Virginia ==
As of September 5, 2024:

#	Title	Judge	Duty station	Born	Term of service			Appointed by
#	Title	Judge	Duty station	Born	Active	Chief	Senior	Appointed by
19	Chief Judge	Frank W. Volk	Beckley	1965	2019–present	2024–present	—	Trump
15	District Judge	Joseph R. Goodwin	Charleston	1942	1995–present	2007–2012	—	Clinton
16	District Judge	Robert Charles Chambers	Huntington	1952	1997–present	2012–2017	—	Clinton
17	District Judge	Thomas E. Johnston	Charleston	1967	2006–present	2017–2024	—	G.W. Bush
18	District Judge	Irene Berger	Charleston	1954	2009–present	—	—	Obama
10	Senior Judge	John Thomas Copenhaver Jr.	Charleston	1925	1976–2018	—	2018–present	Ford
14	Senior Judge	David A. Faber	Bluefield	1942	1991–2008	2002–2007	2008–present	G.H.W. Bush

== Eastern District of Wisconsin ==
As of November 4, 2024:

#	Title	Judge	Duty station	Born	Term of service			Appointed by
#	Title	Judge	Duty station	Born	Active	Chief	Senior	Appointed by
21	Chief Judge	Pamela Pepper	Milwaukee	1964	2014–present	2019–present	—	Obama
16	District Judge	Joseph Peter Stadtmueller	Milwaukee	1942	1987–present	1995–2002	—	Reagan
19	District Judge	Lynn Adelman	Milwaukee	1939	1997–present	—	—	Clinton
22	District Judge	Brett H. Ludwig	Milwaukee	1969	2020–present	—	—	Trump
23	District Judge	Byron B. Conway	Green Bay	1976	2024–present	—	—	Biden
20	Senior Judge	William C. Griesbach	Green Bay	1954	2002–2019	2012–2019	2019–present	G.W. Bush

== Western District of Wisconsin ==
As of April 26, 2017:

#	Title	Judge	Duty station	Born	Term of service			Appointed by
#	Title	Judge	Duty station	Born	Active	Chief	Senior	Appointed by
11	Chief Judge	James D. Peterson	Madison	1957	2014–present	2017–present	—	Obama
10	District Judge	William M. Conley	Madison	1956	2010–present	2010–2017	—	Obama
8	Senior Judge	Barbara Brandriff Crabb	inactive	1939	1979–2010	1980–1996; 2001–2010	2010–present	Carter

== District of Wyoming ==
As of June 1, 2025:

#	Title	Judge	Duty station	Born	Term of service			Appointed by
#	Title	Judge	Duty station	Born	Active	Chief	Senior	Appointed by
9	Chief Judge	Kelly H. Rankin	Cheyenne	1967	2024–present	2025–present	—	Biden
5	District Judge	Alan Bond Johnson	Cheyenne	1939	1985–present	1992–1999	—	Reagan
8	District Judge	Scott W. Skavdahl	Casper	1966	2011–present	2018–2025	—	Obama
7	Senior Judge	Nancy D. Freudenthal	Cheyenne	1954	2010–2022	2011–2018	2022–present	Obama

== See also ==
- List of current United States circuit judges
