= Scott H. Rash =

American judge (born 1963)

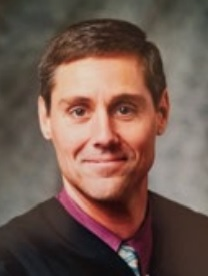

Judge of the United States District Court for the District of Arizona
- Incumbent
- Assumed office May 27, 2020
- Appointed by: Donald Trump
- Preceded by: Cindy K. Jorgenson

Judge of the Pima County Superior Court
- In office September 2010 – May 27, 2020
- Appointed by: Jan Brewer
- Preceded by: Nanette Warner
- Succeeded by: Laurie San Angelo

Personal details
- Born: Scott Hugh Rash; 1963 (age 62–63) Minneapolis, Minnesota, U.S.
- Education: University of Arizona (BSBA, JD)

Scott Hugh Rash (born 1963) is a United States district judge of the United States District Court for the District of Arizona and former state court judge.

== Education ==
Rash earned his Bachelor of Science in Business Administration, with highest honors, from the University of Arizona in 1985 and his Juris Doctor, cum laude, from the University of Arizona College of Law in 1991.

== Career ==
Early in his career, Rash served as an assistant attorney general of criminal prosecution in the Office of the Arizona Attorney General. He was a shareholder at Gabroy, Rollman, & Bossé in Tucson, Arizona, where his practice focused on civil litigation matters. From 2010 to 2020, Rash was a judge on the Arizona Superior Court in Pima County, where he was the presiding family law judge.

=== Federal judicial service ===
On September 12, 2019, President Donald Trump announced his intent to nominate Rash to serve as a United States district judge for the United States District Court for the District of Arizona. On October 15, 2019, his nomination was sent to the Senate. President Trump nominated Rash to the seat vacated by Judge Cindy K. Jorgenson, who assumed senior status on April 6, 2018. A hearing on his nomination before the Senate Judiciary Committee was held on December 4, 2019. On January 16, 2020, his nomination was reported out of committee by a 16–6 vote. On May 18, 2020, the United States Senate invoked cloture on his nomination by a 67–21 vote. On May 19, 2020, his nomination was confirmed by a 74–20 vote. He received his judicial commission on May 27, 2020.

== Memberships ==
He has been a member of the Federalist Society since 2018.

Legal offices
Preceded by Cindy K. Jorgenson	Judge of the United States District Court for the District of Arizona; 2020–present	Incumbent
