= Cindy K. Jorgenson =

American judge (born 1953)

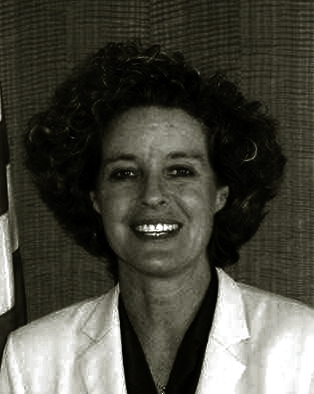

Senior Judge of the United States District Court for the District of Arizona
- Incumbent
- Assumed office April 6, 2018

Judge of the United States District Court for the District of Arizona
- In office March 6, 2002 – April 6, 2018
- Appointed by: George W. Bush
- Preceded by: Seat established by 113 Stat. 1501
- Succeeded by: Scott H. Rash

Personal details
- Born: Cindy Susan Kelly; April 6, 1953 (age 73) Fort Ord, California, U.S.
- Education: University of Arizona (BS, JD)

Cindy Kelly Jorgenson (née Cindy Susan Kelly; born April 6, 1953) is a senior United States district judge of the United States District Court for the District of Arizona.

== Early life and education ==
Born in Fort Ord, California, Jorgenson received a Bachelor of Science degree from the University of Arizona in 1974 and a Juris Doctor from the University of Arizona College of Law in 1977.

== Legal career ==
Following law school, Jorgenson joined the Pima County Attorney's Office as deputy county attorney, where she worked in the Sex Crimes Division and contributed to the development of child abuse laws and rape shield protections in Arizona from 1977 to 1986. She then served as an Assistant United States Attorney in the United States Attorney's Office for the District of Arizona from 1986 to 1996. From 1996 to 2002 she was a judge on the Pima County Superior Court, where she served on the family law bench and became its presiding judge.

== Federal judicial career ==
On September 10, 2001, Jorgenson was nominated by President George W. Bush to a new seat on the United States District Court for the District of Arizona created by 113 Stat. 1501, on the recommendation of Arizona U.S. Senators John McCain and Jon Kyl. The seat was created in response to the high volume of immigration and drug cases before the Arizona District Court stemming from its proximity to the Mexican border, which had produced the second-highest caseload among the nation's 96 district courts at the time. She was confirmed by the United States Senate on February 26, 2002, by a vote of 98–0, and received her commission on March 6, 2002. She served on the Judicial Conference of the United States from 2006 to 2012. She assumed senior status on April 6, 2018. Her seat was subsequently filled by Scott Rash, nominated by President Donald Trump and confirmed in 2020.

Legal offices
Preceded by Seat established by 113 Stat. 1501	Judge of the United States District Court for the District of Arizona; 2002–2018	Succeeded by Scott H. Rash
