= Jared Fogle =

American spokesperson and sex offender (born 1977)

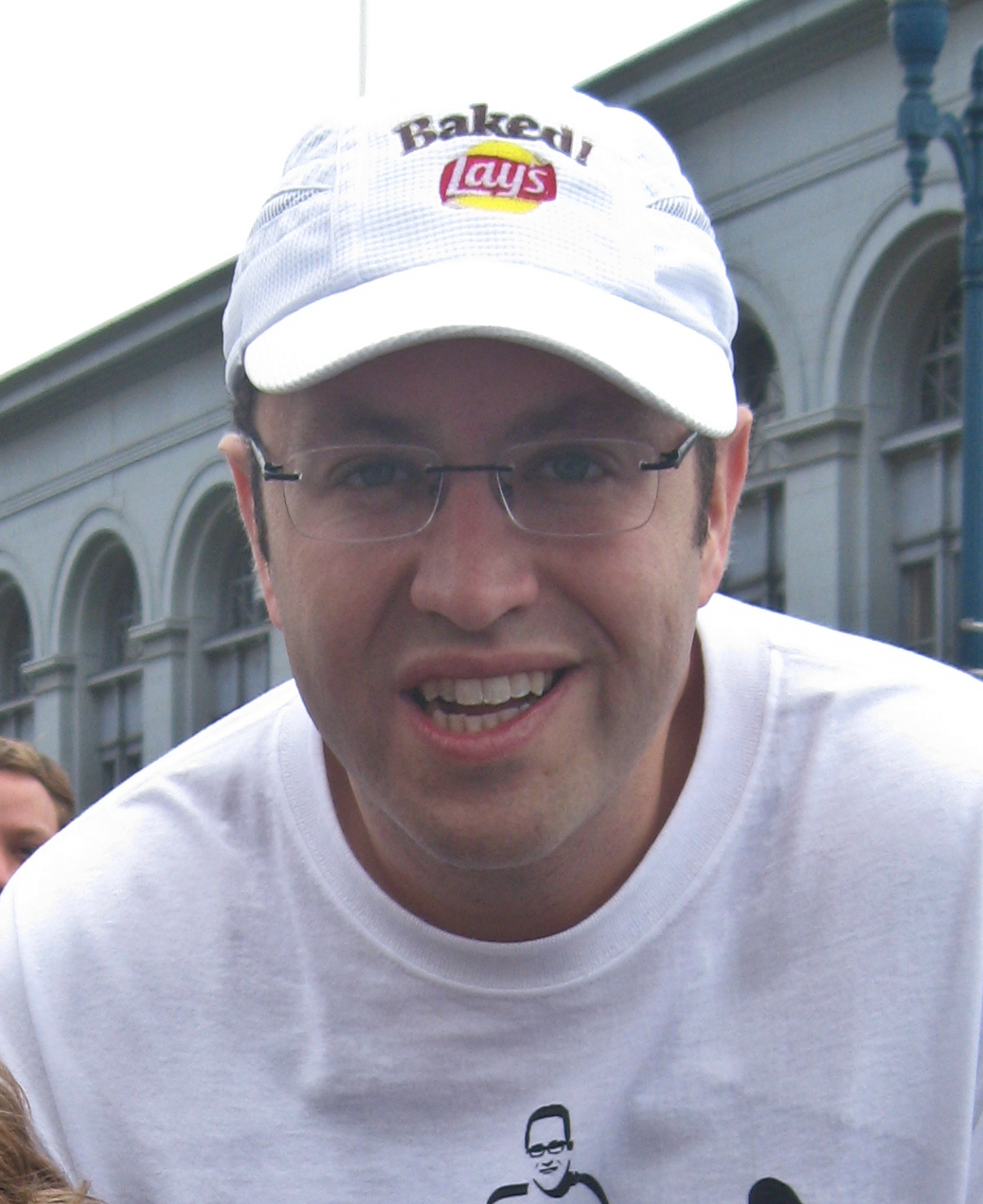
- Fogle in 2011
- Born: Jared Scott Fogle; August 23, 1977 (age 49); Indianapolis, Indiana, U.S.
- Education: Indiana University Bloomington
- Occupations: Spokesman, actor
- Years active: 1999–2015
- Criminal information
- Other name: The Subway Guy
- Status: Incarcerated
- Convictions: Traveling to engage in illicit sexual conduct with a minor (18 U.S.C. § 2423); Distribution and receipt of child pornography (18 U.S.C. § 2252)
- Penalty: 15 years and eight months' imprisonment, lifetime of supervised release, $175,000 fine plus forfeiture of $50,000 (a total of $225,000), and $1.4 million restitution.

Details
- Victims: 14+
- Date apprehended: July 7, 2015; 11 years ago
- Imprisoned at: FCI Englewood; Jefferson County, Colorado, U.S.
- Spouses: Elizabeth Christie (m. 2001; div. 2007); Katie McLaughlin (m. 2010; div. 2015)
- Children: 2

Jared Scott Fogle (/ˈfoʊɡəl/; born August 23, 1977) is an American former spokesman and convicted child sex offender. He appeared in advertising campaigns for Subway from 2000 to 2015, until an FBI investigation led to him being convicted of child sex tourism and possessing child pornography.

While a student at Indiana University, Fogle lost 245 lb (111 kg) between 1998 and 1999. Having frequented a Subway restaurant as part of his diet plan, he was hired to help advertise the company the following year. Fogle's popularity led to his appearances in over 300 commercials during his 15 years with Subway, alongside other media appearances.

Allegations of Fogle having sexual relations with minors began in 2007 but did not gain traction until 2015 when the Federal Bureau of Investigation (FBI) uncovered that he received child pornography from an associate. Pleading guilty to the child sex tourism and child pornography charges the same year, Fogle was sentenced to 15 years and eight months in federal prison. As of 2026, he remains incarcerated at the Federal Correctional Institution, Englewood.

== Early life ==
Jared Scott Fogle was born in Indianapolis, Indiana, on August 23, 1977, to Norman and Adrienne Fogle. He has a younger brother and sister. Raised in a Jewish home, he had a bar mitzvah while on a trip to Israel, and was confirmed by his Conservative-Reconstructionist synagogue.

In 1995, Fogle graduated from North Central High School in Indianapolis. He graduated from Indiana University Bloomington in 2000 and then worked briefly in the revenue management department at American Trans Air.

== Career ==
=== Subway campaign ===
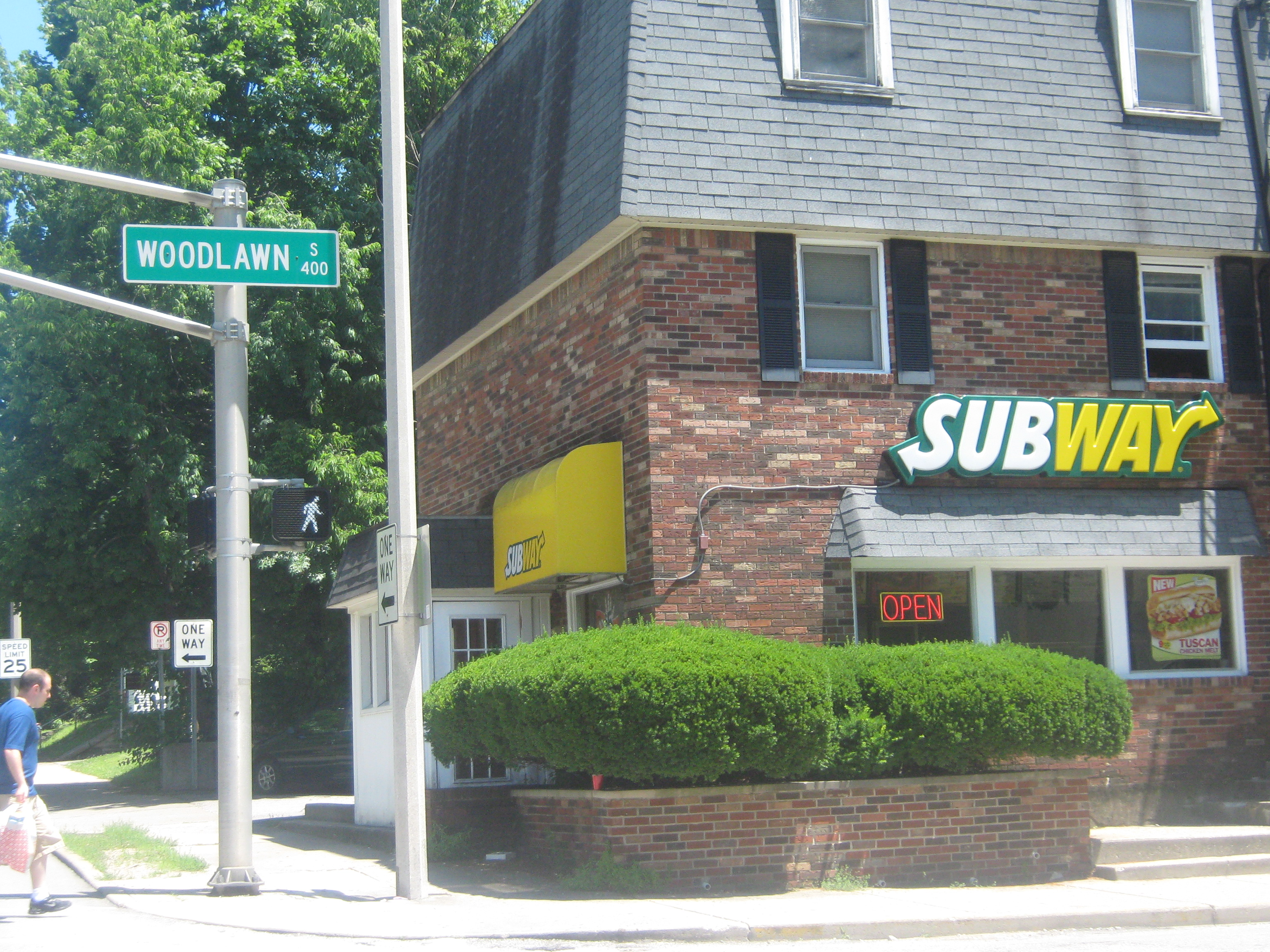
Subway in Bloomington, Indiana, (now closed) which was frequently visited by Fogle.

Fogle first came to media attention in April 1999, via an article published in the Indiana Daily Student written by a former dormmate about Fogle losing 245 lb (111 kg) by exercising and eating a diet of Subway sandwiches. Subsequently, Fogle was featured in a Men's Health magazine article, "Stupid Diets ... that Work!" According to the article, Fogle had become obese – at one point weighing 425 lb (193 kg) – through lack of exercise and eating junk food.

After developing sleep apnea and edema as a result of his weight, Fogle changed his eating habits by making the switch to eating at Subway, replacing his 10,000-calorie-per-day food consumption with one small turkey sub and one large veggie sub, along with some baked potato chips and diet soda, totaling about 2,000 calories. A Chicago-area Subway franchisee took Fogle's story to Subway's Chicago-based advertising agency.

As a test, the company ran a regional television advertising campaign. The first ad aired on January 1, 2000, introducing Fogle and his story with the following disclaimer: "The Subway diet, combined with a lot of walking, worked for Jared. We're not saying this is for everyone. You should check with your doctor before starting any diet program. But it worked for Jared."

The introductory test ads were a success, so Fogle subsequently appeared in more television commercials as well as sponsored in-store appearances throughout the United States. Fogle would give talks on the benefits of fitness and healthy eating, and later came to be known as The Subway Guy.

In 2002, Fogle was the subject of an episode of South Park titled "Jared Has Aides". Fogle has stated that while the episode had "typical[ly] tasteless humor", the fact that an entire episode was devoted to him was "very flattering". He added, "you know you've made it when shows like South Park start parodying you". He was then later parodied in the 2017 video game South Park: The Fractured but Whole; though this occurred two years after his child pornography conviction.

In February 2008, a Subway campaign called "Tour de Pants" celebrated Fogle maintaining his weight loss for a decade. As part of the campaign, Fogle made an announcement that he would retire his pair of 62-inch (157-centimeter) pants to a museum at the end of the advertising tour. Beginning in 2008, Fogle's presence in Subway advertisements decreased amid the company's emphasis on its "$5 Footlong" promotion.

Fogle's role in Subway afforded him some other opportunities, such as appearances in WWE in 2009 and 2011. By 2013, Fogle had filmed more than 300 commercials and continued to make appearances and speeches for the company. Subway attributed one third to one half of its growth in sales to Fogle, with revenue having tripled from 1998 to 2011.

Fogle made appearances in the Sharknado film series, beginning with Sharknado 2: The Second One. He had a cameo appearance in Sharknado 3: Oh Hell No!, though this was cut from the Syfy Channel broadcast version a week before its premiere when his house was searched by the FBI. He also appeared in the 2011 Adam Sandler film Jack and Jill.

=== Jared Foundation ===
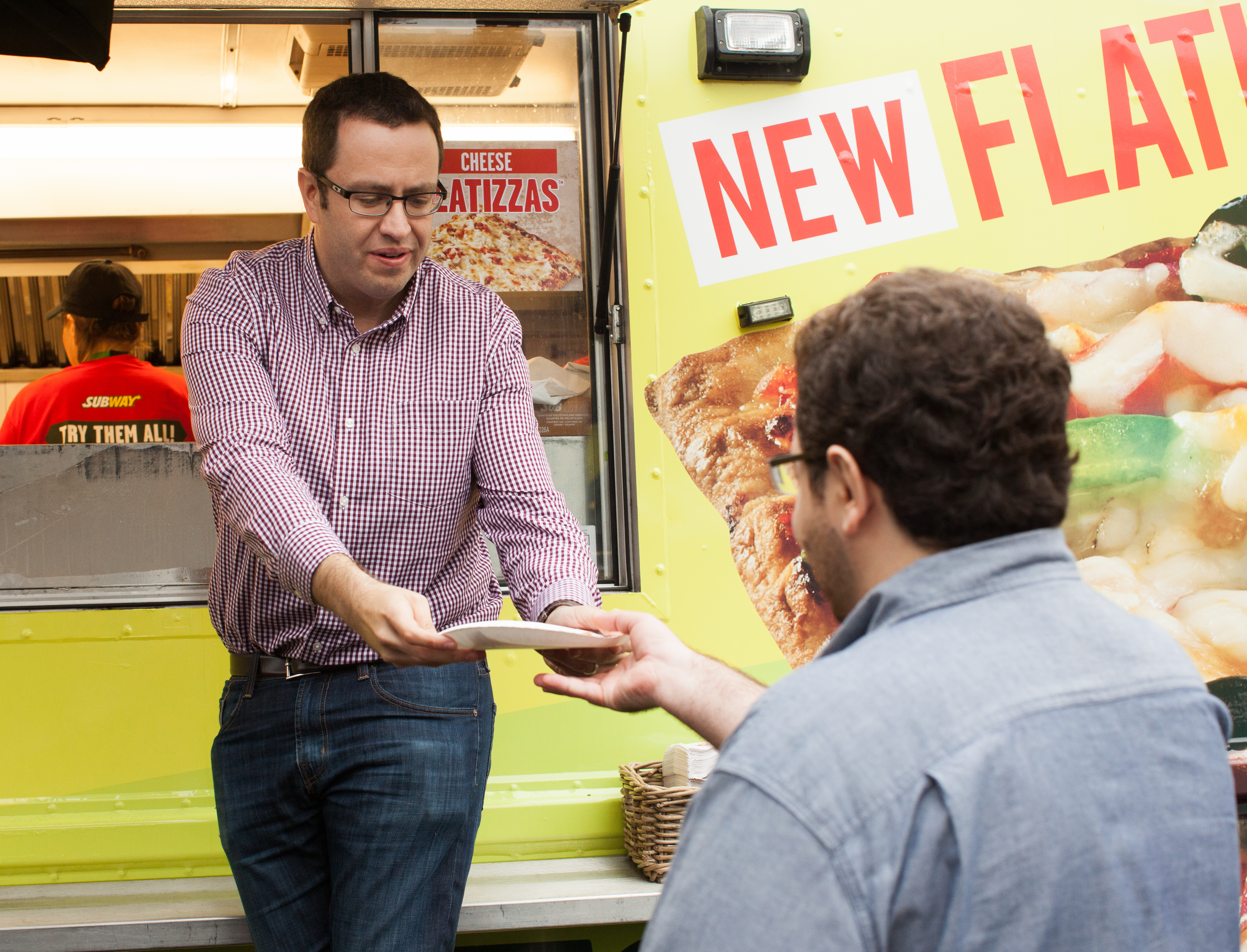
Fogle promoting Subway in 2014

In 2004, Fogle established the Jared Foundation, a nonprofit organization focused on raising awareness about childhood obesity through educational programs and tools provided to parents, schools, and community organizations.

The Secretary of State of Indiana dissolved the organization in February 2012 because it did not pay the required $5 annual reporting fees during the two previous years, despite being requested to do so on multiple occasions.

On April 29, 2015, Russell Taylor, director of the Jared Foundation, was arrested at his Indianapolis home on charges of child exploitation, possession of child pornography, and voyeurism. According to court records, Taylor and his then-wife, Angela Baldwin, sexually molested young girls and installed cameras in their house to film the victims without their knowledge. Fogle severed all ties with Taylor immediately following the arrest. Taylor attempted suicide on May 6, 2015 at the Marion County Jail and was placed on life support. Taylor pleaded guilty to the charges on September 1, 2015, and was sentenced to 27 years in federal prison on December 10, 2015. The sentence was thrown out in March 2020 when it emerged that Taylor's lawyer had failed to challenge three charges that were not supported by the evidence. The judge who originally imposed the sentence, Tanya Walton Pratt, said that this failure tainted the entire plea deal. Prosecutors filed a new indictment for 30 charges of producing and distributing child pornography in April. Taylor filed a petition to plead guilty that May, formally pleading guilty in November 2021. On May 9, 2022 he was sentenced to 27 years in prison, identical to his original sentence. In October 2021, Baldwin was convicted of child exploitation and producing and possessing child pornography, and was sentenced to 33 years in prison.

In August 2015, a USA Today article reported that the Jared Foundation had not issued any grants, nor had it given funds for its stated purpose. The article further noted that, on average, the foundation spent $73,000 a year, with the majority of that figure used to pay the salary of the foundation's executive director. Furthermore, according to the foundation’s tax records, more than a quarter of their funds were unaccounted for. Daniel Borochoff, president of the non-profit charity watchdog group CharityWatch, was quoted in the USA Today article as saying, "If Jared was really interested in helping children through his foundation, he could have gotten more money. As with a lot of celebrities, the charity appears to be more about image-enhancement than charitable deeds."

== Legal history ==
=== Child pornography investigation and arrest ===
In 2007, Fogle came to the attention of state and federal law enforcement agencies after Sarasota, Florida, journalist and radio host Rochelle Herman-Walrond told the Sarasota Police Department he made lewd comments to her about middle school-age girls. Herman-Walrond had met Fogle at a local middle school for a health event, when he was in Sarasota for his speaking tour. She made recordings of Fogle's remarks and saved text messages between them, and then went to the FBI, where agents asked her to record her conversations with him. Herman-Walrond befriended Fogle and for the next four years surreptitiously recorded her conversations with him as part of an ongoing federal investigation. She recorded him making several remarks about having had sex with underage girls and asking her to install a webcam in her children's rooms so he could watch them; ultimately, the FBI could not pursue a case against Fogle using the recordings because they needed more substantive evidence against him.

During the investigation into Russell Taylor's child pornography operation, authorities discovered that Taylor had traded sexually explicit photos and videos of children, some as young as six, with Fogle, including images of his own stepdaughters. Taylor, who was sentenced to 27 years in prison, was later named an unindicted co-conspirator in the FBI's case against Fogle. "What we found in Russell Taylor's home and on his computers led us to Jared Fogle," said Tim Horty, a spokesman for the United States Department of Justice.

On July 7, 2015, the FBI and Indiana State Police investigators raided Fogle's Zionsville, Indiana residence and arrested him on charges of distribution and receipt of child pornography; computers and other electronic equipment were removed from his home. The same day, a spokesperson for Subway announced that the company and Fogle had mutually agreed to suspend their business relationship; subsequently, Subway removed all references to Fogle from its website.

Following Fogle's arrest, the FBI also subpoenaed a series of text messages made in 2008 between Fogle and Subway franchisee Cindy Mills, with whom he was having a sexual relationship at the time. In these messages, Fogle talked about sexually abusing children ranging in age from 9 to 16, told her to work as a prostitute on Craigslist, and asked her to arrange for him to have sex with her 16-year-old cousin. Mills's lawyer said that Mills had alerted Subway's corporate management about the text messages, but that they had responded that because Fogle was not a Subway employee, there was no violation. Subway representatives said they had no record of Mills's allegations.

=== Plea agreement ===
On August 19, 2015, federal prosecutors announced they had reached a deal with Fogle in which he would plead guilty to their August 15, 2015 indictment containing two counts, one of distribution and receipt of child pornography (Count 1), and one of traveling to engage in illicit sexual conduct with a minor—specifically, from Indiana to New York City, where he is charged with paying to engage in sexual acts with a minor girl – known by Fogle to be 17 years old at the time (Count 2). In the August 15 indictment, the United States Attorney for the Southern District of Indiana included allegations in Count 1 that Fogle was fully aware of, and approved of, co-conspirator Russell Taylor soliciting 12 minors, some as young as 13 years old, to perform sexually explicit conduct, which was surreptitiously filmed and then shared with Fogle in the form of images and video files; was aware that Taylor had commercially obtained and then shared with Fogle sexually explicit images of minors as young as six years old; and knowingly shared the material obtained from Taylor with other parties. The August 15 indictment included allegations in Count 2 that Fogle offered adult prostitutes a finder's fee to find him younger sex partners; sent text messages to these prostitutes in which he also expressed sexual interest in young boys; and, in addition to engaging in sexual acts with the aforementioned 17-year-old girl, he also offered her a finder's fee to find him sex partners younger than her.

According to the plea documents filed in the United States District Court for the Southern District of Indiana, Fogle faced up to 50 years in prison had he gone to trial, based on potentially serving, consecutively, a maximum of 20 years on Count 1 and a maximum of 30 years on Count 2. As part of the plea deal – which was not binding on the sentencing judge – prosecutors agreed to seek no more than 12 years, 7 months, while Fogle agreed to not seek a sentence of less than five years. Fogle also agreed to pay a total of US$1.4 million (equivalent to $2.2 million in 2025) in restitution – $100,000 to each victim (equivalent to $136,000 in 2025). As a condition of his plea deal, Fogle would be restricted to supervised contact or communication with minors upon approval of his probation officer, while supervised visits with his own children would be allowed only with approval of their mother, Fogle's soon-to-be ex-wife Katie McLaughlin. Under the terms of the plea agreement, upon release from prison, Fogle will be required to register as a sex offender for the rest of his life and undergo treatment for sexual disorders.

Soon after the plea deal was announced, Subway announced via Twitter that it had completely severed ties with Fogle.

On November 19, 2015, Fogle formally pleaded guilty before federal judge Tanya Walton Pratt. In a statement, Fogle apologized for his crimes, saying that he wanted a chance to become a "good, honest person" and "redeem [his] life" after being ensnared in a life of "deception, lies, and complete self-centeredness." According to John Bradford, a forensic psychiatrist who testified for Fogle's defense team, Fogle suffered from a compulsive eating disorder for several years before losing weight, and replaced food with a sense of "hypersexuality", which included "mild" or "weak" pedophilia. That diagnosis was not accepted by experts in the psychiatry field and was criticized by Judge Pratt and on social media. The next day, Liberty Behavioral Health Corporation psychologist Adam Deming suggested that Bradford's use of the words "mild" and "weak" had meant to convey that Fogle's primary sexual attraction was to early teenagers, but that he had a lesser attraction to younger children.

When Fogle finished his allocution before Judge Pratt, she sentenced him to 15 years and 8 months in prison, over three years more than what prosecutors had sought and three times what Fogle had requested. Pratt stated that the "level of perversion and lawlessness exhibited by Mr. Fogle is extreme." Fogle must serve a minimum of 13 years before becoming eligible for time off with good behavior. After serving his sentence, he will be on supervised release for the rest of his life. Pratt also fined him $175,000 and ordered him to forfeit $50,000 in assets (a total equivalent to $306,000 in 2025), in addition to the restitution he agreed to pay to his victims.

Fogle's lawyer, Ron Elberger, filed a notice of appeal on December 14, 2015. Fogle is able to appeal the sentence, since it is longer than the maximum sentence recommended by the prosecutors. The appeal brief was due by January 25, 2016, but Fogle asked for and was granted an extension for his appeal after Elberger was diagnosed with cancer. After the appeal was filed, the U.S. Attorney's office responded by opposing any sentence reduction. On June 9, 2016, Fogle's sentence was upheld by the United States Court of Appeals for the Seventh Circuit.

=== Incarceration ===
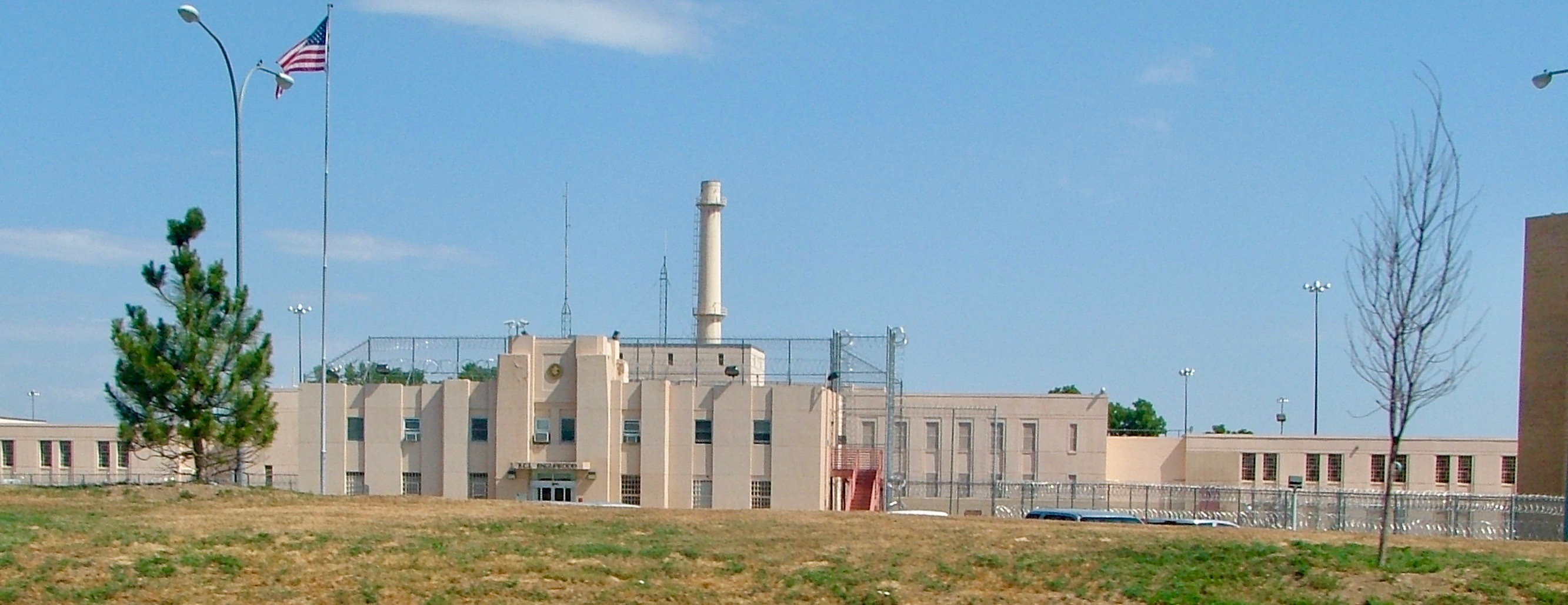
Federal Correctional Institution, Englewood, where Fogle is incarcerated

Fogle's lawyers recommended that he serve his sentence at Federal Correctional Institution, Englewood near Littleton, Colorado, as it has a program for sex offenders. Judge Pratt agreed with the recommendations, but she had no authority to determine where Fogle would serve his sentence. On November 21, 2015, Fogle arrived at the Henderson County, Kentucky, Detention Center, where he was held on a temporary basis. Fogle entered Federal Bureau of Prisons (BOP) custody, going to Federal Transfer Center, Oklahoma City, on December 15, 2015. Three days later, he was transferred to FCI Englewood.

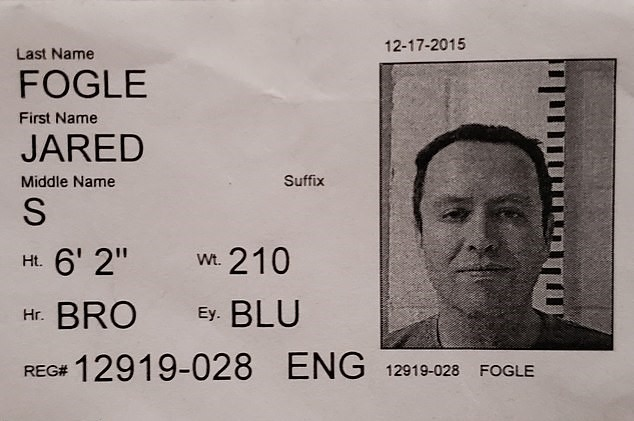
Mugshot of Fogle shortly before being transferred to FCI Englewood in 2015

On January 29, 2016, Fogle was beaten by fellow inmate Steven Nigg. As a result, he sustained a bloody nose, scratches to his neck, and swelling around his face, while his attacker sustained cuts and bruises in return. Nigg's brother James stated that, afterwards, Nigg felt no regret and would have done it again if given the chance.

On November 8, 2017, Judge Pratt dismissed a motion filed by Fogle, which had been prepared for him by a fellow inmate, in which he tried to claim that the court in 2015 did not have jurisdiction to convict Fogle because he is a self-declared "sovereign citizen".

In November 2021, Fogle spoke out from prison for the first time, writing in a letter to the New York Post that he "royally screwed up" and that he runs 4 to 5 miles (6.4 to 8.0 km) per day and works out regularly while behind bars, claiming to weigh 180 pounds (82 kg).

=== Lawsuits ===
In March 2016, the parents of one of Fogle's victims, identified only as "Jane Doe", filed a lawsuit against Fogle for personal injury and emotional distress. Fogle filed a motion arguing that the parents are actually liable for the injuries because the parents fought and abused alcohol in front of the daughter, and that their pending divorce required the victim "to constantly rotate her living arrangements caused [sic] unnecessary stress, anxiety, and trauma for Jane Doe."

On October 24, 2016, Kathleen McLaughlin's lawyers filed suit against Subway in Indiana. The suit alleges that Subway violated McLaughlin's privacy and property rights, and caused personal injury to McLaughlin by covering up at least three instances of Fogle's illegal behavior that were reported to senior management, including the allegation that Subway's senior vice president of marketing hushed up a 2004 incident in which Fogle propositioned an underage girl at a promotional event at a Subway franchise in Las Vegas. The lawsuit was dismissed in October 2017, with the judge writing that the court lacked jurisdiction, since their principal business operations were outside Indiana.

=== Potential for other criminal charges ===
Fogle potentially faced state charges in New York related to Victims 13 and 14. Potential state crimes included statutory rape and trafficking persons for sexual reasons. Fogle's federal plea deal has no standing regarding state charges, so there would have been no double jeopardy had New York opted to pursue a criminal case. However, New York defense attorney and former assistant district attorney Matthew R. Smalls stated that New York State was unlikely to bring state charges since it would have had to mount a new investigation and get testimony from victims. Smalls believed that a prosecutor in New York "would really be tone deaf" to ask Victims 13 and 14 to tell their stories again, let alone testify before another grand jury. Abby Phillip of The Washington Post stated "As a legal matter, Fogle may never be charged with rape – or legally labeled with having committed that crime."

== Personal life ==
Fogle's first marriage was to Elizabeth Christie. Their marriage lasted from 2001 until their divorce in 2007. In November 2009, Fogle became engaged to Kathleen McLaughlin, a teacher. In January 2010, People reported that Fogle had gained back 40 pounds (18 kg) and planned to lose it by way of his Subway weight-loss program for his upcoming wedding. Fogle and McLaughlin married in July 2010 and had two children together: a son (born 2011), and a daughter (born 2013).

In 2013, Fogle had a net worth of $15 million. On August 19, 2015, following Fogle's appearance in federal court on charges of sex with minors and child pornography, his wife released a statement through her attorney announcing that she was seeking a divorce. She added that she was focused "exclusively on the well-being of my children" and would have no further comment. Their divorce was finalized on November 16, 2015. Fogle agreed to pay her $7 million. According to court filings, she had traveled out of state before Fogle's guilty plea, and chose to stay in an undisclosed location to protect herself and the children from the "media circus" surrounding Fogle's prosecution.

A three-part documentary film about Fogle and his crimes called Jared from Subway: Catching a Monster was broadcast on the ID pay television network in March 2023.

== Filmography ==
| Year | Title | Role | Notes |
|---|---|---|---|
| 2000–2015 | Subway commercials | Himself | |
| 2002, 2008 | Saturday Night Live | Himself | 2 episodes |
| 2004 | Super Size Me | Himself | |
| 2011 | Jack and Jill | Himself | |
| 2014 | Community | Himself | "Basic Story" |
| 2014 | Sharknado 2: The Second One | Himself | |
| 2015 | Sharknado 3: Oh Hell No! | Himself | Credited as Jared S. Fogle; cut from SyFy Channel broadcast version |
| 2015 | Dr. Phil | Himself | "Subway Sandwich King to Child Sex Scandal: Jared Fogle's Secret Audio Tapes" |
