= Judge Brooks =

Judge Brooks may refer to:

- Gene Edward Brooks (1931–2004), judge of the United States District Court for the Southern District of Indiana
- George Washington Brooks (1821–1882), judge of the United States District Courts for the Albemarle, Cape Fear and Pamptico Districts of North Carolina and the Eastern District of North Carolina
- Henry Luesing Brooks (1905–1971), judge of the United States Court of Appeals for the Sixth Circuit
- Timothy L. Brooks (born 1964), judge of the United States District Court for the Western District of Arkansas
