= James R. Sweeney II =

American judge (born 1961)

James Sweeney
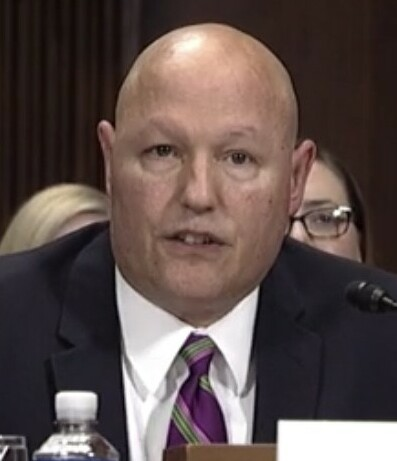

Chief Judge of the United States District Court for the Southern District of Indiana
- Incumbent
- Assumed office July 11, 2025
- Preceded by: Tanya Walton Pratt

Judge of the United States District Court for the Southern District of Indiana
- Incumbent
- Assumed office September 13, 2018
- Appointed by: Donald Trump
- Preceded by: Sarah Evans Barker

Personal details
- Born: James Russell Sweeney II; 1961 (age 64–65) Indianapolis, Indiana, U.S.
- Education: United States Naval Academy (BS); University of Notre Dame (JD)

Military service
- Allegiance: United States
- Branch/service: United States Marine Corps
- Years of service: 1983–1992 (active); 1992–2013 (reserve)
- Rank: Colonel
- Unit: United States Marine Corps Reserves
- Battles/wars: Gulf War
- Awards: See list: Defense Superior Service Medal Legion of Merit Defense Meritorious Service Medal Meritorious Service Medal (2) Air Medal with 3 Strike/Flight and valor Navy and Marine Corps Commendation Medal (2) Navy and Marine Corps Achievement Medal (2) Joint Meritorious Unit Award Navy Unit Commendation Navy Meritorious Unit Commendation Selected Marine Corps Reserve Medal (4) National Defense Service Medal (2) Southwest Asia Service Medal (2) Global War on Terrorism Service Medal Korean Defense Service Medal Military Outstanding Volunteer Service Medal Sea Service Deployment Ribbon (3) Armed Forces Reserve Medal Kuwait Liberation Medal (Saudi Arabia) Kuwait Liberation Medal (Kuwait)

James Russell Sweeney II (born 1961) is the chief United States district judge of the United States District Court for the Southern District of Indiana.

== Biography ==
Sweeney received a Bachelor of Science, with merit, in 1983 from the United States Naval Academy. From 1983 to 1992 Sweeney was an active duty Naval Flight Officer in the United States Marine Corps. He received a Juris Doctor, magna cum laude, in 1996 from Notre Dame Law School. Sweeney then clerked for Judge John Daniel Tinder of the United States District Court for the Southern District of Indiana and Judge James L. Ryan of the United States Court of Appeals for the Sixth Circuit. In 1999, Sweeney joined the Indianapolis law firm Barnes & Thornburg as an associate and was promoted to partner in 2005, where he practiced corporate law and civil law until becoming a judge in 2018.

== Federal judicial service ==
His nomination was announced and sent to the Senate on November 1, 2017. President Trump nominated Sweeney to the seat on the United States District Court for the Southern District of Indiana vacated by Judge Sarah Evans Barker, who assumed senior status on June 30, 2014. A hearing on his nomination before the Senate Judiciary Committee was held on January 10, 2018. On February 8, 2018, the Judiciary Committee voted to report his nomination by voice vote. On August 28, 2018, his nomination was confirmed by voice vote. He received his judicial commission on September 13, 2018. He was sworn in on September 24, 2018. He became the chief judge on July 11, 2025.

Legal offices
Preceded by Sarah Evans Barker	Judge of the United States District Court for the Southern District of Indiana; 2018–present	Incumbent
Preceded by Tanya Walton Pratt	Chief Judge of the United States District Court for the Southern District of Indiana; 2025–present	Incumbent
