= Judge Pryor =

Judge Pryor may refer to:

- Doris Pryor (born 1977), judge of the United States Court of Appeals for the Seventh Circuit
- Jill A. Pryor (born 1963), judge of the United States Court of Appeals for the Eleventh Circuit
- William H. Pryor Jr. (born 1962), judge of the United States Court of Appeals for the Eleventh Circuit
