= Jane Magnus-Stinson =

American judge (born 1958)

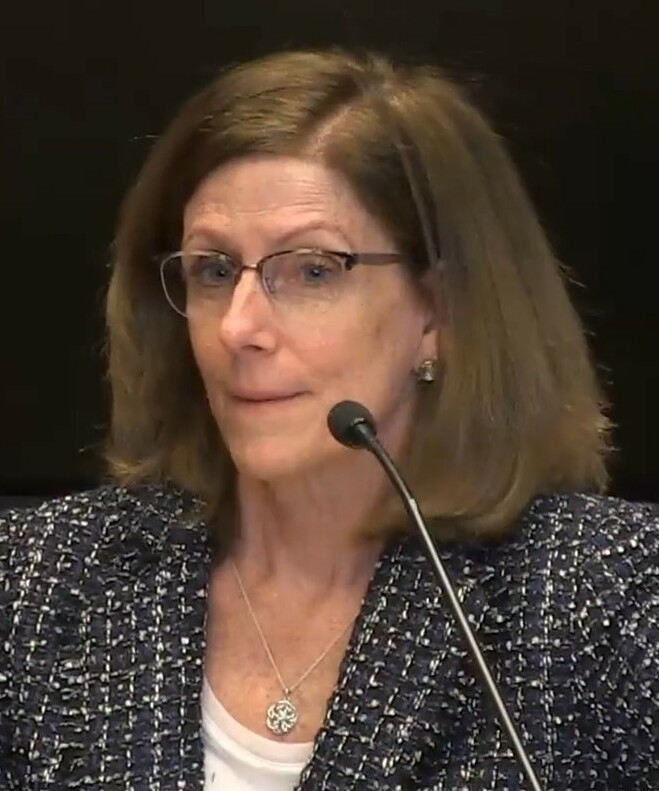
- Magnus-Stinson in 2019

Senior Judge of the United States District Court for the Southern District of Indiana
- Incumbent
- Assumed office July 1, 2024

Chief Judge of the United States District Court for the Southern District of Indiana
- In office November 23, 2016 – March 20, 2021
- Preceded by: Richard L. Young
- Succeeded by: Tanya Walton Pratt

Judge of the United States District Court for the Southern District of Indiana
- In office June 9, 2010 – July 1, 2024
- Appointed by: Barack Obama
- Preceded by: Larry J. McKinney
- Succeeded by: Justin R. Olson

Magistrate Judge of the United States District Court for the Southern District of Indiana
- In office 2007 – June 9, 2010

Personal details
- Born: Jane Elizabeth Magnus; 1958 (age 67–68) La Crosse, Wisconsin, U.S.
- Education: Butler University (BA); Indiana University, Indianapolis (JD)

Jane Elizabeth Magnus-Stinson (born 1958) is a senior United States district judge of the United States District Court for the Southern District of Indiana.

== Early life and education ==
Born in La Crosse, Wisconsin, Magnus-Stinson earned a Bachelor of Arts degree from Butler University in 1979 and a Juris Doctor from the Indiana University Robert H. McKinney School of Law in 1983.

== Career ==
From 1983 until 1990, Magnus-Stinson worked as an associate for a law firm in Indianapolis. From 1991 until 1995, she worked for then-Governor Evan Bayh, first as an executive assistant in 1991 and then as Counsel to the Governor from 1991 until 1995. She also served as Bayh's Deputy Chief of Staff from 1994 until 1995. From 1995 until 2007, Magnus-Stinson served as a Superior Court judge on the Marion County Superior Court, in the Criminal Division.

=== Federal judicial service ===
In January 2007, Magnus-Stinson became a United States magistrate judge of the United States District Court for the Southern District of Indiana, a position she held until becoming a federal district judge in 2010.

In November 2008, Magnus-Stinson notified Senator Bayh, who by that point had become one of Indiana's two senators, of interest in a district court judgeship. After Magnus-Stinson underwent a series of interviews with officials from the United States Department of Justice and the Office of the White House Counsel, President Obama on January 20, 2010, nominated Magnus-Stinson to the seat on the Southern District of Indiana, to replace Judge Larry J. McKinney, who assumed senior status on July 4, 2009. On March 11, 2010, the United States Senate Committee on the Judiciary reported Magnus-Stinson's nomination out of committee. The United States Senate confirmed Magnus-Stinson by a voice vote on June 7, 2010. She received her commission on June 9, 2010. She served as the chief judge from November 23, 2016. and served until March 20, 2021. She assumed senior status on July 1, 2024.

Legal offices
Preceded by Larry J. McKinney	Judge of the United States District Court for the Southern District of Indiana; 2010–2024	Succeeded by Justin R. Olson
Preceded by Richard L. Young	Chief Judge of the United States District Court for the Southern District of Indiana; 2016–2021	Succeeded by Tanya Walton Pratt
