= Robert C. Baltzell =

American judge (1879–1950)

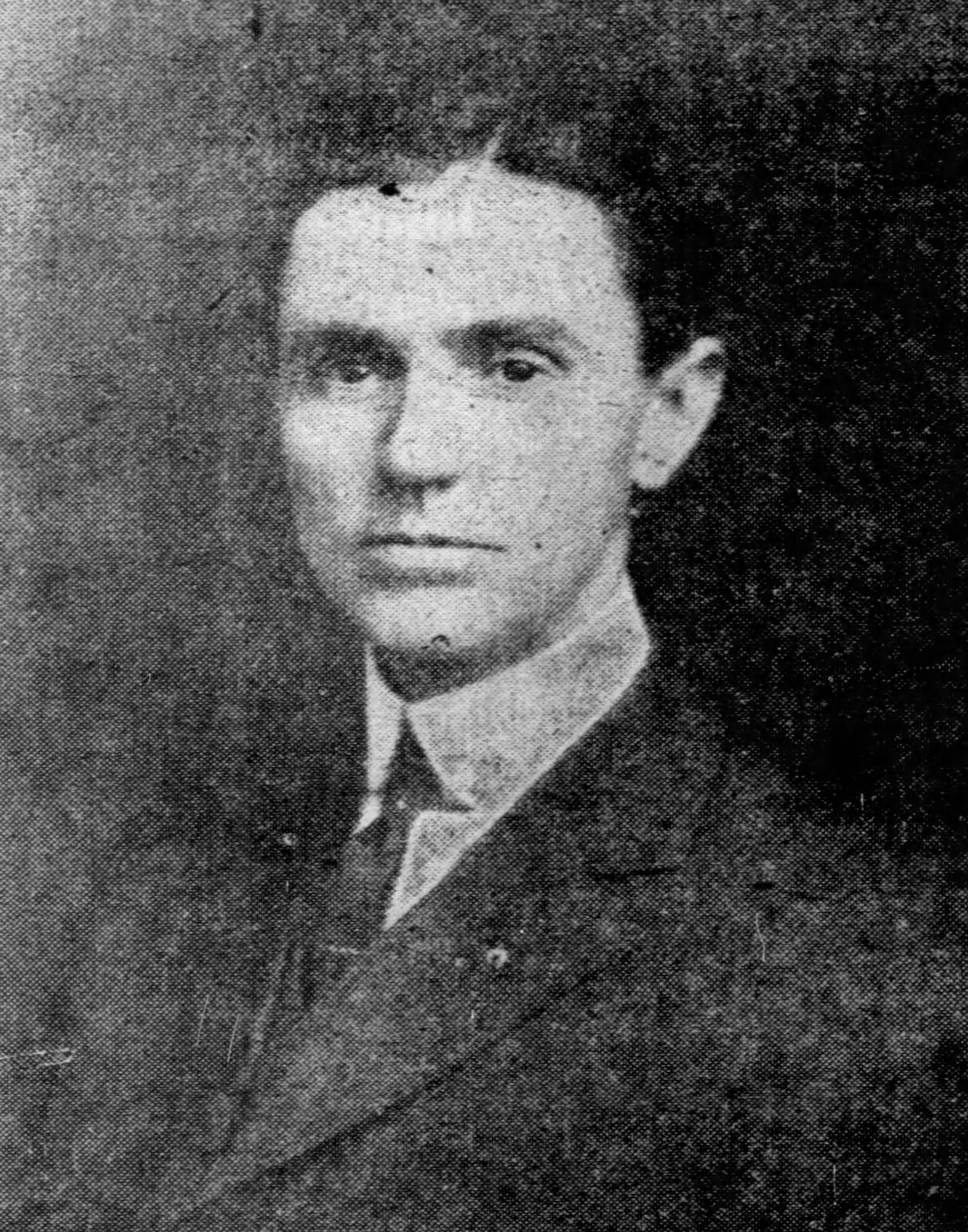

Senior Judge of the United States District Court for the Southern District of Indiana
- In office January 19, 1950 – October 18, 1950

Judge of the United States District Court for the Southern District of Indiana
- In office April 21, 1928 – January 19, 1950
- Appointed by: operation of law
- Preceded by: Seat established by 45 Stat. 437
- Succeeded by: William Elwood Steckler

Judge of the United States District Court for the District of Indiana
- In office January 13, 1925 – April 21, 1928
- Appointed by: Calvin Coolidge
- Preceded by: Albert B. Anderson
- Succeeded by: Seat abolished

Personal details
- Born: Robert Clarence Baltzell; August 15, 1879 Lawrence County, Illinois, U.S.
- Died: October 18, 1950 (aged 71)
- Education: Northern Illinois University; Marion Law School (LL.B.)

Robert Clarence Baltzell (August 15, 1879 – October 18, 1950) was a United States district judge of the United States District Court for the District of Indiana and the United States District Court for the Southern District of Indiana.

== Education and career ==
Born in Lawrence County, Illinois, Baltzell attended Northern Illinois State Normal School (now Northern Illinois University) and then received a Bachelor of Laws from Marion Law School in 1904. He was in the United States Army Reserve as a Major from 1917 to 1919. He was in private practice in Princeton, Indiana from 1904 to 1920. He was a Judge of the Gibson County Circuit Court in Princeton from 1920 to 1925.

== Federal judicial service ==
Baltzell was nominated by President Calvin Coolidge on January 2, 1925, to a seat on the United States District Court for the District of Indiana vacated by Judge Albert B. Anderson. He was confirmed by the United States Senate on January 13, 1925, and received his commission the same day. Baltzell was reassigned by operation of law to the United States District Court for the Southern District of Indiana on April 21, 1928, to a new seat authorized by 45 Stat. 437. He assumed senior status on January 19, 1950. His service terminated on October 18, 1950, due to his death.

== Sources ==
Legal offices
Preceded by Albert B. Anderson	Judge of the United States District Court for the District of Indiana; 1925–1928	Succeeded by Seat abolished
Preceded by Seat established by 45 Stat. 437	Judge of the United States District Court for the Southern District of Indiana; 1928–1950	Succeeded by William Elwood Steckler
