= David Hamilton (judge) =

American judge (born 1957)

Senior Judge of the United States Court of Appeals for the Seventh Circuit
- Incumbent
- Assumed office December 5, 2022

Judge of the United States Court of Appeals for the Seventh Circuit
- In office November 23, 2009 – December 5, 2022
- Appointed by: Barack Obama
- Preceded by: Kenneth Francis Ripple
- Succeeded by: Doris Pryor

Chief Judge of the United States District Court for the Southern District of Indiana
- In office January 1, 2008 – November 24, 2009
- Preceded by: Larry J. McKinney
- Succeeded by: Richard L. Young

Judge of the United States District Court for the Southern District of Indiana
- In office October 11, 1994 – November 24, 2009
- Appointed by: Bill Clinton
- Preceded by: Samuel Hugh Dillin
- Succeeded by: Tanya Walton Pratt

Personal details
- Born: David Frank Hamilton; May 5, 1957 (age 69) Bloomington, Indiana, U.S.
- Education: Haverford College (BA); Yale University (JD); University of Tübingen

David Frank Hamilton (born May 5, 1957) is a senior United States circuit judge of the United States Court of Appeals for the Seventh Circuit. He was previously a United States district judge of the United States District Court for the Southern District of Indiana. On March 17, 2009, he became President Barack Obama's first judicial nominee when he was named for a seat on the Seventh Circuit. He was confirmed by the Senate on November 19, 2009, in a 59–39 vote.

== Early life, education, and career ==
Born in Bloomington, Indiana, Hamilton grew up in southern Indiana and earned a Bachelor of Arts degree from Haverford College in 1979, followed by a Juris Doctor from Yale Law School in 1983. He also performed graduate work as a Fulbright Scholar at the University of Tübingen in Germany.

Hamilton worked from 1983 until 1984 as a law clerk for Judge Richard Dickson Cudahy of the United States Court of Appeals for the Seventh Circuit. He then entered private practice in Indianapolis until 1989 as an associate at the law firm of Barnes & Thornburg. He served as Legal Counsel to Indiana Governor Evan Bayh from 1989 until 1991. Hamilton returned to Barnes & Thornburg in Indianapolis, working as a partner from 1991 until becoming a federal judge in 1994. During his time in private practice, Hamilton frequently did pro bono work for the Indiana Civil Liberties Union, where he served briefly as a board member and Vice President for Litigation.

== Federal judicial service ==
=== District court service ===
President Bill Clinton nominated Hamilton to be a United States district judge of the United States District Court for the Southern District of Indiana on June 8, 1994. A majority of the American Bar Association Standing Committee on the Federal Judiciary deemed Hamilton not qualified, citing his lack of trial experience and only having been a member of the bar for 9 years, less than their recommendation of 12 years.

The Senate confirmed Hamilton by a voice vote on October 7, 1994. He received his commission on October 11, 1994. Hamilton was the chief judge of the Southern District of Indiana from January 1, 2008, to November 24, 2009. His service as a district court judge was terminated on November 24, 2009, when he was elevated to the court of appeals.

A number of cases Hamilton decided as a district court judge drew media attention. In American Amusement Mach. Ass'n v. Cottey, Hamilton held that the First Amendment did not prevent the city of Indianapolis from requiring parental consent for children to have access to video games containing explicit sexual content or extreme violence. This ruling was overturned by the Seventh Circuit.

Hamilton drew headlines in 2005 for ruling that the Indiana state legislature violated the Establishment Clause when it began sessions with Christian prayers imploring conversion to Christianity or representing Christianity as the only true faith. He held that prayers invoking Jesus Christ or using terms like savior were sectarian, but names for God in other languages were permissible, absent evidence that those words were used in order to advance or disparage a particular religion. The ruling was overturned by the Seventh Circuit on the ground that the taxpayer plaintiffs lacked standing.

=== Court of appeals service ===
On March 17, 2009, President Barack Obama announced his intention to nominate Hamilton to a vacancy on the United States Court of Appeals for the Seventh Circuit that was created by Judge Kenneth Francis Ripple, who assumed senior status in September 2008. Obama formally nominated Hamilton later that day. He became President Barack Obama's first judicial nominee when he was named for a seat on the Seventh Circuit. The American Bar Association deemed Hamilton well qualified.

On November 17, 2009, the Senate invoked cloture on his nomination 70–29 vote. On November 19, 2009, Hamilton's nomination was confirmed by a 59–39 vote. He received his commission on November 23, 2009. On December 1, 2021, he announced his intent to assume senior status upon confirmation of a successor. He assumed senior status on December 5, 2022.

=== Notable opinions ===
- In March 2017, Hamilton partially dissented when the circuit found that police officers could not be sued for needlessly destroying property during a search because they had prevented the owner from witnessing which officers had caused the damage and that the owner had not pled a novel “conspiracy of silence” claim.
- In December 2017, Hamilton authored the majority opinion in Dassey v. Dittmann, which denied Brendan Dassey's habeas corpus petition to have his murder conviction thrown out because, his lawyers argued, it was based on a coerced false confession. Dassey's confession had become the source of national outrage when portions of it were aired in the Netflix miniseries Making a Murderer. Brendan Dassey was sixteen at the time of the confession, and had an IQ of approximately 80. Despite noting the numerous inconsistencies and troubling procedural problems with the confession, Hamilton, along with three Conservative judges on the 7th Circuit en banc appeals court, decided that the confession was a viable piece of evidence and that Dassey's murder conviction should stand.Dassey v. Dittmann, 877 F.3d 297 (7th Cir. 2017).
- On August 27, 2019, Hamilton wrote the majority opinion in blocking Indiana's parental notification requirement. Hamilton was joined by Ilana Rovner, over the dissent of Michael Stephen Kanne. On November 1, 2019, the seventh circuit denied rehearing by a vote of 6–5, with Hamilton in the majority, however Frank Easterbrook, who provided the decisive vote, called on the Supreme Court to hear the case.
- On August 29, 2019, Hamilton was one of 3 judges that upheld Illinois' assault weapon ban.
- On February 24, 2020, Hamilton authored the majority opinion in Viamedia v. Comcast, a case dealing with a contentious doctrine in American antitrust law known as refusal to deal. Although the opinion was not based on a trial and only allowed Viamedia to proceed with its monopolization claims against Comcast, some antitrust scholars believe the case could "breathe life" into refusal to deal claims, which have generally lost favor following the Supreme Court's decision in Verizon Communications Inc. v. Law Offices of Curtis V. Trinko, LLP.
- On December 17, 2021, Hamilton dissented in a 7-3 decision that ruled that a police officer who stopped a car because it was following another car too closely and then searched the car for drugs did not violate the 4th amendment. Hamilton showed concern that the 7th circuit's ruling could allow a police officer to detain someone at a basic traffic stop until the officer is satisfied.
- On October 16, 2025, Hamilton was one of three judges who blocked the Trump administration from deploying the National Guard against protesters in Chicago.. The Trump administration appealed to the Supreme Court, and on December 23, 2025, the Supreme Court declined to reverse the ruling blocking National Guard deployment.

== Family ==
Hamilton's brother, John Hamilton, served as the mayor of Bloomington, Indiana from 2016 to 2024. John Hamilton is married to Dawn Johnsen, whose nomination to serve as assistant attorney general for the Office of Legal Counsel in the United States Department of Justice was blocked by the Senate. His father, Richard "Dick" Hamilton is a retired United Methodist minister who served the North United Methodist Church in Indianapolis for many years. Hamilton is a nephew of former Congressman Lee Hamilton.

== See also ==
- Barack Obama judicial appointment controversies
- Boika v. Holder

Legal offices
Preceded by Samuel Hugh Dillin	Judge of the United States District Court for the Southern District of Indiana; 1994–2009	Succeeded by Tanya Walton Pratt
Preceded by Larry J. McKinney	Chief Judge of the United States District Court for the Southern District of Indiana; 2008–2009	Succeeded by Richard L. Young
Preceded by Kenneth Francis Ripple	Judge of the United States Court of Appeals for the Seventh Circuit; 2009–2022	Succeeded by Doris Pryor
