= Larry J. McKinney =

American judge (1944–2017)

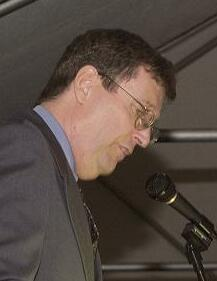
- McKinney in 2003

Senior Judge of the United States District Court for the Southern District of Indiana
- In office July 4, 2009 – September 21, 2017

Chief Judge of the United States District Court for the Southern District of Indiana
- In office 2001–2007
- Preceded by: Sarah Evans Barker
- Succeeded by: David Hamilton

Judge of the United States District Court for the Southern District of Indiana
- In office July 20, 1987 – July 4, 2009
- Appointed by: Ronald Reagan
- Preceded by: William Elwood Steckler
- Succeeded by: Jane Magnus-Stinson

Personal details
- Born: July 4, 1944 South Bend, Indiana, U.S.
- Died: September 21, 2017 (aged 73) Edinburgh, Indiana, U.S.
- Education: MacMurray College (B.A.); Indiana University Maurer School of Law (J.D.)

Larry Jim McKinney (July 4, 1944 – September 21, 2017) was a United States district judge of the United States District Court for the Southern District of Indiana.

== Education and career ==
Born in South Bend, Indiana on July 4, 1944, McKinney received a Bachelor of Arts degree from MacMurray College in 1966 and a Juris Doctor from Indiana University Maurer School of Law in 1969. He was a deputy state attorney general of Indiana from 1970 to 1971. He was in private practice in Edinburgh, Indiana from 1971 to 1975. He was in private practice in Greenwood, Indiana from 1975 to 1979. He was a Circuit Judge of Johnson County, Indiana from 1979 to 1987.

== Federal judicial service ==
McKinney was nominated by President Ronald Reagan on May 5, 1987, to a seat on the United States District Court for the Southern District of Indiana vacated by Judge William Elwood Steckler. He was confirmed by the United States Senate on July 17, 1987, and received his commission on July 20, 1987. He served as Chief Judge from 2001 to 2007. He assumed senior status on July 4, 2009, and served in that status until his death on September 21, 2017.

== Sources ==
Legal offices
Preceded by William Elwood Steckler	Judge of the United States District Court for the Southern District of Indiana; 1987–2009	Succeeded by Jane Magnus-Stinson
Preceded by Sarah Evans Barker	Chief Judge of the United States District Court for the Southern District of Indiana; 2001–2007	Succeeded by David Hamilton
