= David W. Evans =

American politician (born 1946)

David Evans
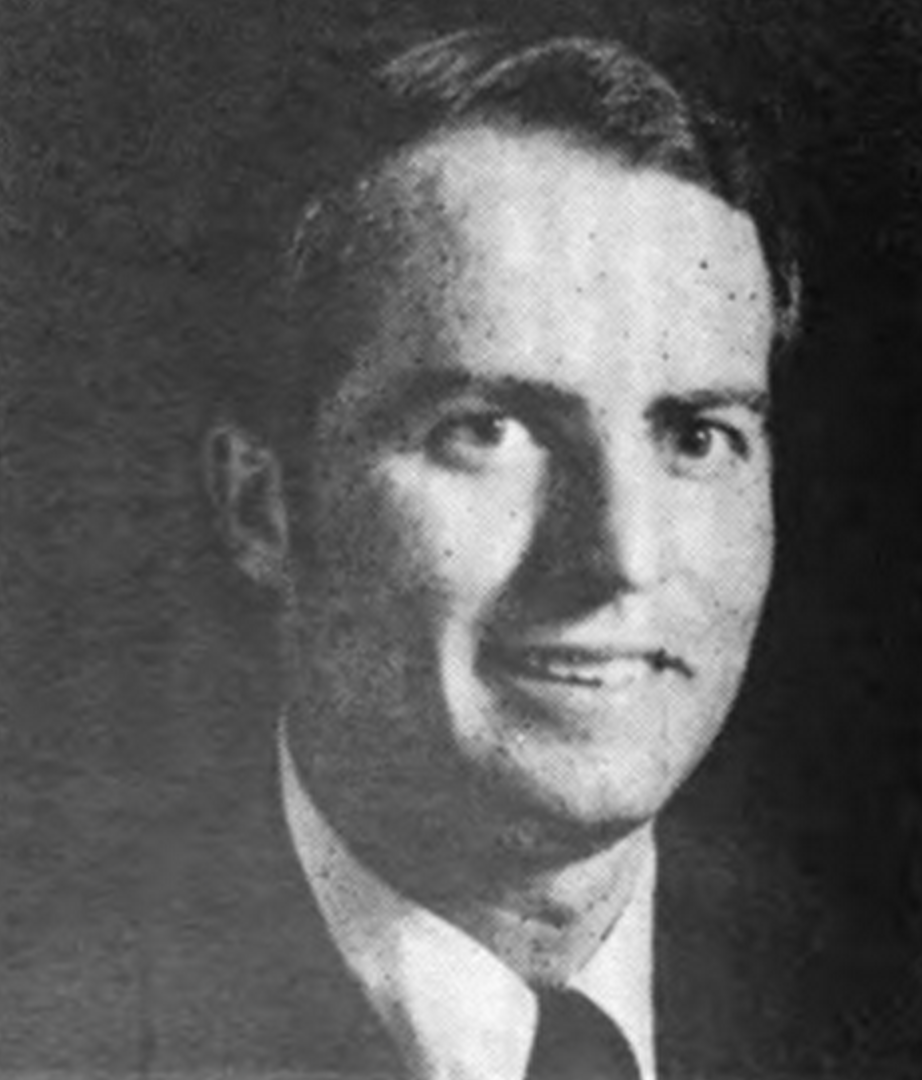

Member of the U.S. House of Representatives from Indiana's 6th district
- In office January 3, 1975 – January 3, 1983
- Preceded by: William G. Bray
- Succeeded by: Andrew Jacobs Jr. (redistricted)

Personal details
- Born: David Walter Evans; August 17, 1946 (age 79) Lafayette, Indiana, U.S.
- Party: Democratic
- Education: Indiana University, Bloomington (BA); Butler University

David Walter Evans (born August 17, 1946) is an American educator who served four terms as a U.S. representative from Indiana from 1975 to 1983.

== Early life and career ==
Born in Lafayette, Indiana, Evans attended public schools in Shoals, Indiana. In 1967, he graduated from Indiana University, where he also did some postgraduate work from 1967 to 1969. This was followed by work at Butler University from 1969 to 1971.

Between 1968 and 1974, Evans was a teacher of social studies and science. Also, he served as delegate to the Democratic National Mid-term Convention in 1974.

== Congress ==
Evans was elected as a Democrat to the Ninety-fourth Congress as well as to the three succeeding Congresses (January 3, 1975 - January 3, 1983).

After the 1980 census, the Republican-controlled Indiana General Assembly radically altered Evans' 6th District, turning it into a heavily Republican district centered on Indianapolis' wealthy northern suburbs. It appeared that the district was redrawn for State Senator Dan Burton. In the process, Evans' home was moved into the neighboring 10th District of fellow Democrat Andy Jacobs. Rather than face almost certain defeat in the 6th, Evans ran against Jacobs in the Democratic primary for the 10th and was soundly defeated. He was succeeded by Burton, who would hold the seat (now numbered as the 5th District) for 30 years.

== Later career ==
Evans lives in McLean, Virginia, and works as a legislative consultant in Washington.

U.S. House of Representatives
Preceded by William G. Bray	Member of the U.S. House of Representatives from Indiana's 6th congressional district 1975–1983	Succeeded by Dan Burton
U.S. order of precedence (ceremonial)
Preceded by John Fleming as Former U.S. Representative	Order of precedence of the United States as Former U.S. Representative	Succeeded by Todd Rokita as Former U.S. Representative
