= Samuel Hugh Dillin =

American judge (1914–2006)

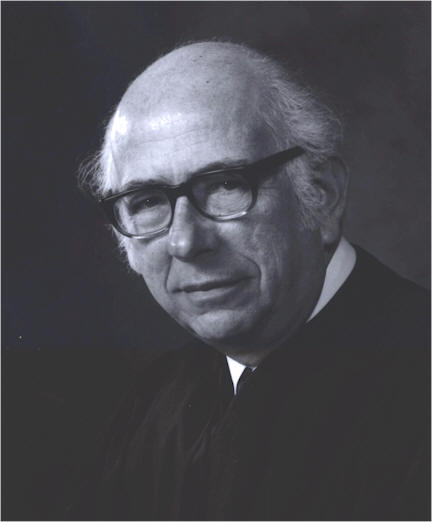

Senior Judge of the United States District Court for the Southern District of Indiana
- In office March 31, 1993 – March 13, 2006

Chief Judge of the United States District Court for the Southern District of Indiana
- In office 1982–1984
- Preceded by: William Elwood Steckler
- Succeeded by: James Ellsworth Noland

Judge of the United States District Court for the Southern District of Indiana
- In office September 22, 1961 – March 31, 1993
- Appointed by: John F. Kennedy
- Preceded by: Seat established by 75 Stat. 80
- Succeeded by: David Hamilton

Personal details
- Born: Samuel Hugh Dillin; June 9, 1914 Petersburg, Indiana, U.S.
- Died: March 13, 2006 (aged 91) Cambridge, Massachusetts, U.S.
- Education: Indiana University Bloomington (A.B.); Indiana University Maurer School of Law (LL.B.)

Samuel Hugh Dillin (June 9, 1914 – March 13, 2006), often referred to as S. Hugh Dillin, was a United States district judge of the United States District Court for the Southern District of Indiana.

== Education and career ==
Born in Petersburg, Indiana, Dillin received an Artium Baccalaureus degree from Indiana University Bloomington in 1936 and a Bachelor of Laws from Indiana University Maurer School of Law in 1938. He was in private practice in Petersburg from 1938 to 1942. He was Secretary of the Public Service Commission of Indiana from 1942 to 1943. He served in the United States Army during World War II, from 1943 to 1946, achieving the rank of captain, and thereafter returned to private practice in Petersburg from 1946 to 1961. Dillin was also a member of the Indiana House of Representatives in 1937, 1939, 1941, and 1951, and was a member of the Indiana Senate from 1959 to 1961.

== Federal judicial service ==
On September 14, 1961, Dillin was nominated by President John F. Kennedy to a new seat on the United States District Court for the Southern District of Indiana created by 75 Stat. 80. He was confirmed by the United States Senate on September 21, 1961, and received his commission on September 22, 1961. He served as Chief Judge from 1982 to 1984. He assumed senior status on March 31, 1993. Dillin served in that capacity until his death on March 13, 2006, in Cambridge, Massachusetts.

== See also ==
- List of United States federal judges by longevity of service

== Sources ==
Legal offices
Preceded by Seat established by 75 Stat. 80	Judge of the United States District Court for the Southern District of Indiana; 1961–1993	Succeeded by David Hamilton
Preceded by William Elwood Steckler	Chief Judge of the United States District Court for the Southern District of Indiana; 1982–1984	Succeeded by James Ellsworth Noland
