= William G. Bray =

American politician (1903–1979)

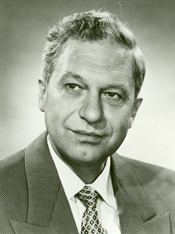

Member of the U.S. House of Representatives from Indiana
- In office January 3, 1951 – January 3, 1975
- Preceded by: James E. Noland
- Succeeded by: David W. Evans
- Constituency: 7th district (1951–1967); 6th district (1967–1975)

Personal details
- Born: June 17, 1903 Mooresville, Indiana, U.S.
- Died: June 4, 1979 (aged 75) Martinsville, Indiana, U.S.
- Party: Republican
- Education: Indiana University Law School (Juris doctor, 1927)
- Occupation: Attorney
- Awards: Silver Star

Military service
- Branch/service: United States Army Reserve
- Years of service: 1941–1946
- Rank: Colonel

William Gilmer Bray (June 17, 1903 – June 4, 1979) was an American lawyer and World War II veteran who served twelve terms as a Republican member of the United States House of Representatives from Indiana from 1951 to 1975.

== Early life ==
William Gilmer Bray was born on June 17, 1903, in Mooresville, Indiana, to a working-class family. His father worked for the railroad, and Bray was raised in a modest household that emphasized discipline and perseverance—values that would shape his later career.

Bray attended Mooresville High School, where he excelled in both academics and athletics, particularly basketball. He went on to study at Indiana University, financing his education through janitorial and part-time jobs. He earned a bachelor's degree and subsequently received his J.D. degree from the Indiana University School of Law in 1927.

After completing his studies, Bray returned to Mooresville to practice law. His sharp legal mind and rising reputation led to his election as prosecutor for Morgan County, Indiana.

On August 16, 1930, Bray married Esther Felicile Debra.

== Military service ==
Bray entered active duty with the U.S. Army in June 1941 and was assigned to Company A of the 193rd Tank Battalion, stationed at Fort Benning, Georgia. His participation in the Louisiana Maneuvers and Carolina Maneuvers later that year earned him the nickname “Wild Bill” for his aggressive training style and leadership.

Following the attack on Pearl Harbor, the 193rd was among the first armored units sent to the Pacific. On December 16, 1941, Bray and the battalion departed Fort Benning for San Francisco, where they embarked aboard the SS President Taylor. They arrived in Honolulu, Hawaii, on January 7, 1942.

In 1943, Bray was appointed commander of the 767th Tank Battalion, which was later attached to the 7th Infantry Division. He oversaw the transformation of the unit into an amphibious-capable force, preparing them for combat in the Pacific. Under Bray's command, the 767th conducted extensive training in waterproofing, jungle warfare, infantry-tank coordination, and flame-thrower tank development. The battalion also implemented an innovative tank-infantry telephone system to improve coordination during assaults.

In January 1944, Bray led the battalion in Operation Flintlock, the amphibious assault on Kwajalein Atoll in the Marshall Islands. The 767th supported the 7th Infantry Division by breaching heavily fortified enemy positions. For his leadership in the campaign, Bray was awarded the Silver Star. His after-action report noted that “each man knew his individual job, resulting in a maximum collective effort,” and praised the "superior conduct" of officers and men in their first combat experience.

After the battle, Bray was selected for advanced training at the U.S. Army Armor School at Fort Knox, returning to command in July 1944. Following the Japanese surrender in 1945, he was assigned to the U.S. Army Military Government in Korea, where he participated in the postwar occupation and stabilization effort. He returned to Indiana in July 1946.

== Political career ==
After returning from Korea in July 1946, Bray resumed his law practice and became active in Indiana Republican politics. By 1950, he was persuaded by party leaders and veterans' groups to run for Congress. That year, Bray was elected to the U.S. House of Representatives from Indiana's 7th Congressional District, defeating incumbent Democrat James E. Noland. He took office in January 1951, serving in the 82nd Congress.

Due to redistricting, Bray later represented Indiana's 6th District and was re-elected nine times, serving ten consecutive terms in Congress until he was defeated for re-election in 1974.

During his tenure, Bray served on the House Armed Services Committee, where he became known for his strong support of national defense, particularly during the Korean and Vietnam Wars. He was recognized for his opposition to communism and what he saw as government overreach. As noted in a retrospective, Bray “remained a steadfast Cold Warrior, promoting strong defense appropriations and voicing deep suspicion of Soviet aims around the globe.”

He supported legislation aimed at bolstering U.S. military readiness, improving veterans’ benefits, and limiting federal interference in state and local affairs. A consistent fiscal conservative, Bray "warned against runaway federal budgets and the erosion of personal liberties through bureaucratic expansion."

In 1964, Bray ran for governor of Indiana, campaigning on a platform of limited government, law and order, and economic conservatism. Despite his name recognition and wartime credentials, he was defeated in the Republican primary by Lieutenant Governor Richard O. Ristine.

Bray returned to Congress following the gubernatorial race and served another decade in Washington before he was defeated for re-election in 1974 by Democrat David W. Evans. He retired to Indiana, where he remained active in veterans’ causes and civic life until his death in 1979.

== Later career and death ==
After leaving Congress, Bray resumed law practice in Martinsville and remained active in civic and veterans’ affairs. President Gerald R. Ford appointed him to the American Battle Monuments Commission, where he served from 1975 to 1978."American Battle Monuments Commission Members, 1923–present". American Battle Monuments Commission.

Bray died at his home in Martinsville on June 4, 1979, and was interred at White Lick Cemetery in Mooresville, Indiana."Bill Bray: Part 4". The Reporter-Times. Martinsville, Indiana. August 16, 1979. p. 36.

== Honors ==
Bray was an Indiana Freemason, and in 1993, William G. Bray Commandery No. 65 of the Masonic-related Knights Templar of Indiana was chartered in Mooresville in his honor and memory.

U.S. House of Representatives
Preceded by James E. Noland	Member of the U.S. House of Representatives from Indiana's 7th congressional district 1951–1967	Succeeded by John T. Myers
Preceded by Richard L. Roudebush	Member of the U.S. House of Representatives from Indiana's 6th congressional district 1967–1975	Succeeded by David W. Evans
