= John Daniel Tinder =

American judge (born 1950)

John Tinder
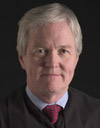

Senior Judge of the United States Court of Appeals for the Seventh Circuit
- In office February 18, 2015 – October 9, 2015

Judge of the United States Court of Appeals for the Seventh Circuit
- In office December 21, 2007 – February 18, 2015
- Appointed by: George W. Bush
- Preceded by: Daniel Anthony Manion
- Succeeded by: Amy Coney Barrett

Judge of the United States District Court for the Southern District of Indiana
- In office August 10, 1987 – December 21, 2007
- Appointed by: Ronald Reagan
- Preceded by: James Ellsworth Noland
- Succeeded by: William T. Lawrence

United States Attorney for the Southern District of Indiana
- In office 1984–1987
- President: Ronald Reagan
- Preceded by: Sarah Evans Barker
- Succeeded by: Deborah Daniels

Personal details
- Born: John Daniel Tinder; February 17, 1950 (age 76) Indianapolis, Indiana, U.S.
- Education: Indiana University, Bloomington (BS, JD)

John Daniel Tinder (born February 17, 1950) is a retired United States circuit judge of the United States Court of Appeals for the Seventh Circuit.

== Background ==
Born in Indianapolis, Indiana on February 17, 1950, Tinder attended Brebeuf Jesuit Preparatory School in Indianapolis. He received a Bachelor of Science degree from Indiana University Bloomington in 1972, and a Juris Doctor from the Indiana University Maurer School of Law in 1975. He is a member of the Indiana University School of Law (Bloomington) Academy of Law Alumni.

While in law school, Tinder worked at the U.S. Attorney's office in Indianapolis during 1974, and served as an Assistant United States Attorney for the Southern District of Indiana from 1974 to 1977. In 1977, Tinder entered private practice in Indianapolis, which he continued in until 1984 when he returned to the United States Attorney Office in Indianapolis, this time as its leader. In addition to his work in the private sector, Tinder served as a public defender from 1977 to 1978 for the Marion County Criminal Court. From 1979 to 1982, Tinder was chief trial deputy for the Marion County Prosecutor's Office. He was the United States Attorney for the Southern District of Indiana from 1984 to 1987, and was also an adjunct professor at the Indiana University School of Law from 1980 to 1988.

== Federal judicial service ==
Tinder was nominated to a judgeship on the United States District Court by President Ronald Reagan on June 2, 1987, to replace Judge James Noland on the United States District Court for the Southern District of Indiana, and the United States Senate confirmed him just two months later on August 7, 1987. He received his commission on August 10, 1987. His service as a district court judge was terminated on December 21, 2007, when he was elevated to the court of appeals.

After twenty years of service as a trial judge, Tinder was nominated on July 17, 2007, by President George W. Bush to replace Judge Daniel Anthony Manion on the Seventh Circuit bench. Manion had previously indicated he would assume senior status upon confirmation of a successor. Tinder's hearings before the Senate Judiciary Committee were uncontroversial, and he was voted out of Committee to the Senate floor in November 2007. He was confirmed on December 18, 2007, by a 93–0 vote, almost five months after he was nominated. He received his commission on December 21, 2007.

== Retirement from judicial service ==
In March 2014, Tinder announced his retirement plans for February 2015, when he would turn 65 years old. Tinder previewed his post-retirement career plans in an interview with The Indiana Lawyer. He assumed senior status on February 18, 2015, one day after his 65th birthday. He retired from senior service on October 9, 2015. In July 2016, the Indiana Law Review published articles in tribute to Tinder's service by United States Court of Appeals for the Seventh Circuit Judge Diane Wood, United States District Court for the Southern District of Indiana Judge Richard L. Young, Indiana University-Purdue University Indianapolis Chancellor Emeritus Gerald Bepko, and former clerk Daniel Pulliam.

Legal offices
Preceded by Sarah Evans Barker	United States Attorney for the Southern District of Indiana; 1984–1987	Succeeded by Deborah J. Daniels
Preceded by James Ellsworth Noland	Judge of the United States District Court for the Southern District of Indiana; 1987–2007	Succeeded by William T. Lawrence
Preceded by Daniel Anthony Manion	Judge of the United States Court of Appeals for the Seventh Circuit; 2007–2015	Succeeded by Amy Coney Barrett
