= Kenneth Francis Ripple =

American judge (born 1943)

Kenneth Ripple

Senior Judge of the United States Court of Appeals for the Seventh Circuit
- Incumbent
- Assumed office September 1, 2008

Judge of the United States Court of Appeals for the Seventh Circuit
- In office May 10, 1985 – September 1, 2008
- Appointed by: Ronald Reagan
- Preceded by: Seat established
- Succeeded by: David Hamilton

Personal details
- Born: Kenneth Francis Ripple; May 19, 1943 (age 83) Pittsburgh, Pennsylvania, U.S.
- Education: Fordham University (AB); University of Virginia (JD); George Washington University (LLM)

Kenneth Francis Ripple (born May 19, 1943) is a senior United States circuit judge of the United States Court of Appeals for the Seventh Circuit.

== Education and career ==
Ripple was born in Pittsburgh, Pennsylvania. He received an Artium Baccalaureus degree from Fordham University in 1965. He received a Juris Doctor from University of Virginia School of Law in 1968. He received a Master of Laws from George Washington University Law School in 1972. He was in the United States Navy from 1968 to 1972. He was in the United States Naval Reserve Judge Advocate General's Corps since 1972. He was an attorney for IBM's Office of the General Counsel in 1968. He was a legal officer of the Supreme Court of the United States from 1972 to 1973. He was a special assistant to Chief Justice Warren E. Burger of the Supreme Court of the United States from 1973 to 1977. He was in private practice of law in Washington, D.C. from 1977 to 1985. He has been a Professor of Law at the University of Notre Dame since 1977. He was a reporter of the Advisory Committee on Federal Appellate Rules from 1978 to 1985.

== Federal judicial service ==
Ripple was nominated by President Ronald Reagan on April 1, 1985, to the United States Court of Appeals for the Seventh Circuit, to a new seat created by 98 Stat. 333. He was confirmed by the United States Senate on May 3, 1985, and received commission on May 10, 1985. He assumed senior status on September 1, 2008.

== Writings and other service ==
Ripple has written numerous books and articles on constitutional litigation, judicial decision-making and a wide variety of other legal topics. A member of the Virginia, New York, Indiana and District of Columbia Bars, Ripple has the distinction of serving on the American delegation to the 1980 Anglo-American Judicial Exchange. He is also a member of the American Law Institute and has chaired the Advisory Committee on Federal Appellate Rules of Procedure. After 46 years of teaching, Ripple retired his position as professor of law at the University of Notre Dame Law School, taking emeritus status. He previously taught Conflict of Laws, Federal Courts, and a Judicial Process Seminar.

== Notable cases ==
On November 21, 2016, Judge Ripple, joined by District Judge Barbara Brandriff Crabb found that the high number of wasted votes created by the 2011 Wisconsin State Assembly redistricting was unconstitutional partisan gerrymandering, over dissent by District Judge William C. Griesbach.

In October 2018, Ripple dissented when the majority, in an opinion by Chief Judge Diane Wood, found that Tony Evers, then Superintendent of Public Instruction of Wisconsin, did not violate the Constitution's Free Exercise Clause nor its Establishment Clause when he denied bussing to an independent catholic school because there was a nearby archdiocesan school.

== See also ==
- List of law clerks for the chief justice of the United States

== Sources ==
- Biography at Notre Dame Law School

Legal offices
New seat	Judge of the United States Court of Appeals for the Seventh Circuit; 1985–2008	Succeeded by David Hamilton
