= William T. Lawrence (judge) =

American judge (born 1947)

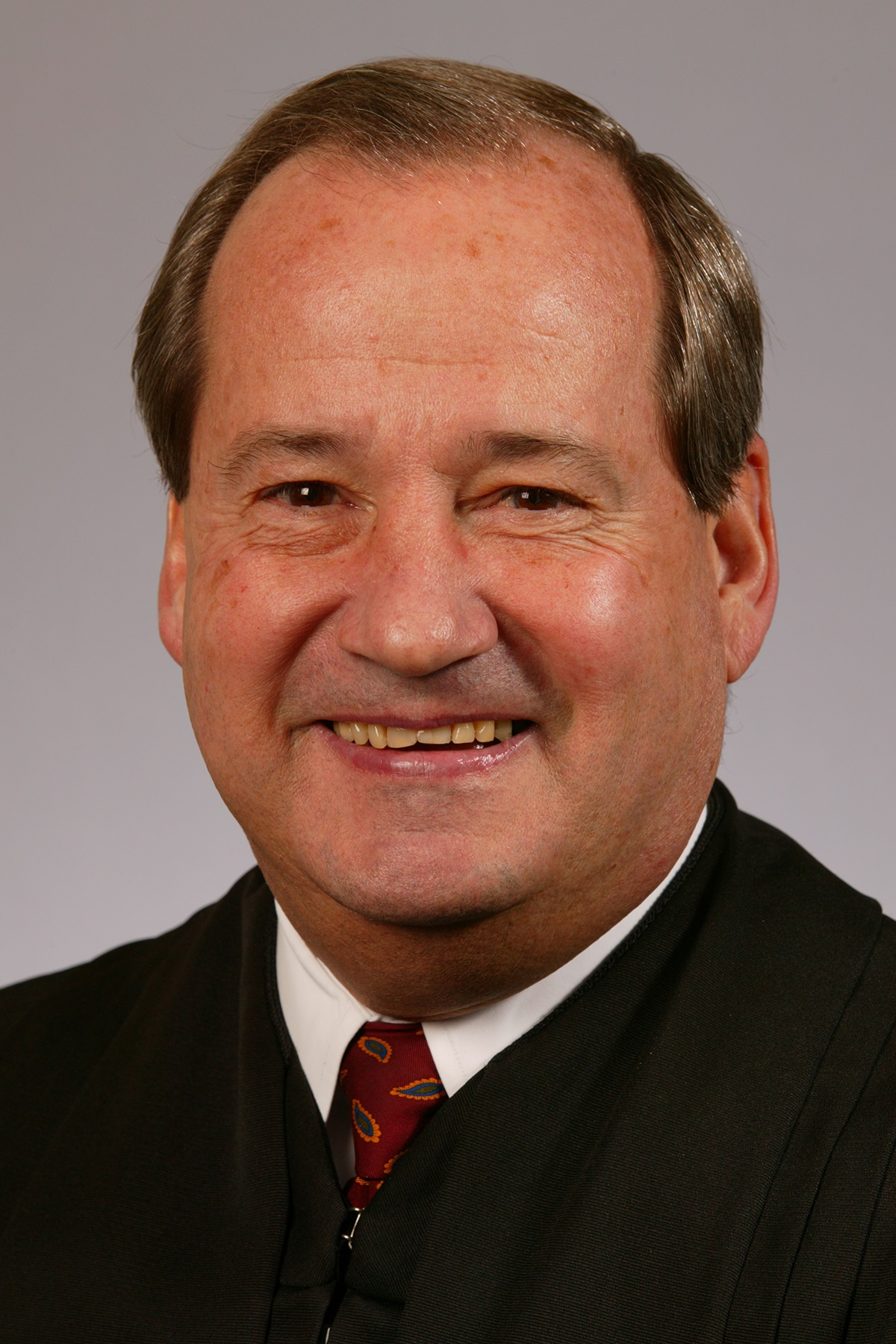

Senior Judge of the United States District Court for the Southern District of Indiana
- Incumbent
- Assumed office July 1, 2018

Judge of the United States District Court for the Southern District of Indiana
- In office June 30, 2008 – July 1, 2018
- Appointed by: George W. Bush
- Preceded by: John Daniel Tinder
- Succeeded by: J. P. Hanlon

Magistrate Judge of the United States District Court for the Southern District of Indiana
- In office 2000–2008

Personal details
- Born: 1947 (age 78–79) Indianapolis, Indiana, U.S.
- Education: Indiana University (BS, JD)

William T. Lawrence (born 1947) is an inactive senior United States district judge of the United States District Court for the Southern District of Indiana.

== Education and career ==
Born in Indianapolis, Lawrence received a Bachelor of Science degree from Indiana University in 1970 and a Juris Doctor from the Indiana University Robert H. McKinney School of Law in 1973. He was in private practice in Indianapolis from 1973 to 1997. He was a public defender within the Marion County Superior Court from 1974 to 1983. He was the master commissioner of the Marion County Circuit Court from 1983 to 1997. He was a presiding judge of the Marion County Circuit Court from 1997 to 2002. He was a United States magistrate judge of the United States District Court for the Southern District of Indiana from 2002 to 2008.

=== Federal judicial service ===
Lawrence was nominated by President George W. Bush on February 14, 2008, to the United States District Court for the Southern District of Indiana, to a seat vacated by Judge John Daniel Tinder. He was confirmed by the United States Senate on June 26, 2008, and received his commission on June 30, 2008. He assumed senior status on July 1, 2018.

== Notable cases ==
International child pornography:

Roger Lee Loughry Sr., 57, of Baltimore, Md., was sentenced by U.S. District Court Judge William T. Lawrence in the Southern District of Indiana to 30 years in prison for his role as an administrator of an online bulletin board. On April 15, 2010, Loughry was convicted by a federal jury in the Southern District of Indiana following a four-day trial. Loughry was found guilty of one count of conspiracy to advertise child pornography, one count of conspiracy to distribute child pornography, 12 counts of advertising child pornography and two counts of distributing child pornography.

== Sources ==
- https://www.justice.gov/opa/pr/two-defendants-sentenced-prison-international-child-pornography-conspiracy-case-0

Legal offices
Preceded by John Daniel Tinder	Judge of the United States District Court for the Southern District of Indiana; 2008–2018	Succeeded by J. P. Hanlon
