= J. P. Hanlon =

American judge (born 1970)

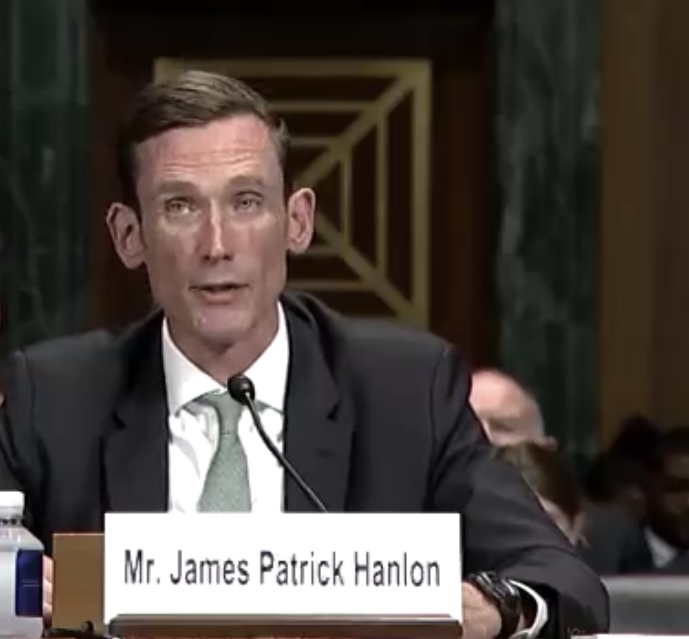

Judge of the United States District Court for the Southern District of Indiana
- Incumbent
- Assumed office November 5, 2018
- Appointed by: Donald Trump
- Preceded by: William T. Lawrence

Personal details
- Born: James Patrick Hanlon; 1970 (age 55–56) Evanston, Illinois, U.S.
- Education: DePauw University (BA); Valparaiso University (JD)

James Patrick "J. P." Hanlon (born 1970) is a United States district judge of the United States District Court for the Southern District of Indiana.

== Education ==
Hanlon earned his Bachelor of Arts from DePauw University and his Juris Doctor, magna cum laude, from the Valparaiso University School of Law, where he was an editor of the school's law review.

== Career ==
After graduating from law school, he served as a law clerk to Judge Robert Lowell Miller Jr. of the United States District Court for the Northern District of Indiana. From 1998 to 2001, Hanlon practiced as an associate in the labor and employment law practice group at Seyfarth Shaw LLP in Chicago. From 2001 to 2006, he served for five years as an assistant United States attorney for the Southern District of Indiana. During that period, he tried twelve jury and two bench trials to successful resolution on behalf of the government, and argued multiple cases on appeal before the Seventh Circuit.

Before becoming a judge, he was a partner in the Indianapolis office of Faegre Baker Daniels LLP, where he served as co-chair of the firm's white collar criminal defense and investigations practice. Before Faegre Baker Daniels was formed through the merger of Baker & Daniels LLP and Faegre & Benson LLP in 2012, he had been a partner with Baker & Daniels LLP since 2006.

Hanlon has served as an adjunct professor at the Indiana University Robert H. McKinney School of Law, where he taught courses on white collar crime.

== Federal judicial service ==
On April 10, 2018, President Donald Trump announced his intent to nominate Hanlon to serve as a United States District Judge of the United States District Court for the Southern District of Indiana. On April 12, 2018, his nomination was sent to the Senate. He was nominated to the seat that was vacated by Judge William T. Lawrence, who assumed senior status on July 1, 2018. On June 6, 2018, a hearing on his nomination was held before the Senate Judiciary Committee. On June 28, 2018, his nomination was reported out of committee by a voice vote. On October 11, 2018, his nomination was confirmed by a voice vote. He received his judicial commission on November 5, 2018. He was sworn in on November 13, 2018.

=== Notable cases ===
On June 30, 2021, Hanlon issued an injunction against Indiana's "abortion reversal law", blocking the law while it makes its way through the courts.

On June 16, 2023, he issued an order stopping an Indiana ban on puberty blockers and hormones for transgender minors from taking effect as scheduled July 1. The injunction was vacated by the Court of Appeals for the Seventh Circuit.

Legal offices
Preceded by William T. Lawrence	Judge of the United States District Court for the Southern District of Indiana; 2018–present	Incumbent
