= Matthew P. Brookman =

American judge (born 1968)

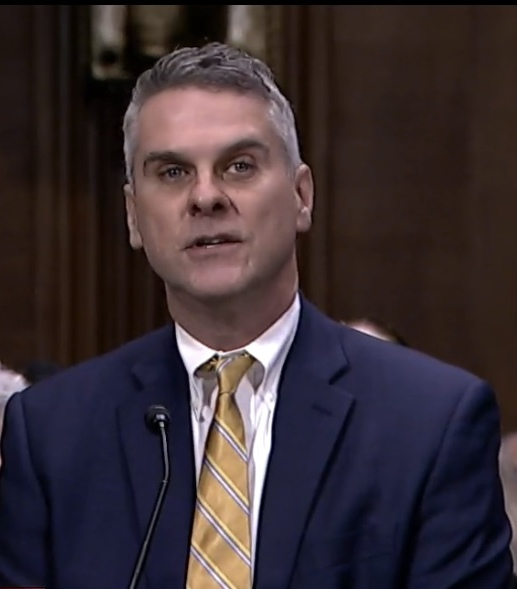

Judge of the United States District Court for the Southern District of Indiana
- Incumbent
- Assumed office March 31, 2023
- Appointed by: Joe Biden
- Preceded by: Richard L. Young

Magistrate Judge of the United States District Court for the Southern District of Indiana
- In office February 1, 2016 – March 31, 2023
- Preceded by: William G. Hussmann
- Succeeded by: Crystal S. Wildeman

Personal details
- Born: Matthew Paul Brookman; 1968 (age 57–58) St. Louis, Missouri, U.S.
- Education: DePauw University (BA); Washington University in St. Louis (JD)

Matthew Paul Brookman (born 1968) is an American lawyer from Indiana who serves as a United States district judge of the United States District Court for the Southern District of Indiana. He previously served as a United States magistrate judge of the same court from 2016 to 2023.

== Education ==
Brookman earned a Bachelor of Arts from DePauw University in 1990 and a Juris Doctor from the Washington University School of Law in 1993. Brookman also studied abroad at the University of Essex in Colchester, England.

== Career ==
Brookman began his legal career as an associate for Brown & James in St. Louis, Missouri, from 1993 to 1994. From 1994 to 1997, he was a state court prosecutor in Jefferson County, Missouri. From 1997 to 1999, he was an associate at the law firm Herzog, Crebs & McGhee in St. Louis. From 1999 to 2002, he was a special assistant United States attorney in the U.S. Attorney's Office for the Western District of Missouri and from 2002 to 2016, he was an assistant United States attorney in the U.S. Attorney's Office for the Southern District of Indiana. Brookman served as the chief of the office's drug and violent crime unit and lead organized crime and drug enforcement task force attorney. He has been a part-time adjunct professor at the University of Southern Indiana and the University of Evansville.

=== Notable cases ===
As an assistant U.S. Attorney, Brookman was involved in prosecuting the quadruple homicide case of United States v. Jarvis Brown, et al. In 2010, Brookman received the Director's Award from Attorney General Eric Holder for his work on the case.

=== Federal judicial service ===
Brookman was appointed as a United States magistrate judge of the United States District Court for the Southern District of Indiana on September 14, 2015, to fill the vacancy left by the retirement of Judge William G. Hussmann, who retired on January 31, 2016. He assumed office on February 1, 2016. His service as a magistrate judge ended on March 31, 2023 when he was elevated to district court judge.

On December 21, 2022, President Joe Biden announced his intent to nominate Brookman to serve as a United States district judge of the United States District Court for the Southern District of Indiana. On January 3, 2023, his nomination was sent to the Senate. President Biden nominated Brookman to the seat to be vacated by Judge Richard L. Young, who announced his intent to assume senior status upon confirmation of a successor. On January 25, 2023, a hearing on his nomination was held before the Senate Judiciary Committee. On March 9, 2023, his nomination was reported out of committee by voice vote. On March 29, 2023, the United States Senate confirmed his nomination by voice vote. He received his judicial commission on March 31, 2023. He was sworn in on April 3, 2023.

Legal offices
Preceded by Richard L. Young	Judge of the United States District Court for the Southern District of Indiana; 2023–present	Incumbent
