= Seyfarth Shaw =

Chicago-based law firm

Seyfarth Shaw LLP
- Headquarters: Willis Tower; Chicago, U.S.
- No. of offices: 17
- No. of attorneys: 970
- Major practice areas: General practice
- Revenue: ▲$990.7 million USD (2025) (+6.3%)
- Date founded: 1945 (Chicago)
- Founder: Henry Seyfarth, Lee Shaw, and Owen Fairweather
- Company type: Limited liability partnership
- Website: www.seyfarth.com

Seyfarth Shaw LLP (/ˈsaɪfɑːrθ/ SY-farth) is an international AmLaw 100 law firm headquartered in Chicago, Illinois. Founded in Chicago in 1945 by Henry Seyfarth, Lee Shaw, and Owen Fairweather, Seyfarth Shaw initially focused on the area of labor law.

As of 2025, the firm was among the most profitable law firms in the United States with approximately 1,000 attorneys

Lorie Almon was elected chair in 2023 and assumed the position of chair and managing partner of the firm on January 1, 2024. She is the first woman to hold that title at Seyfarth.

Seyfarth Shaw has 19 offices globally. This includes 14 active offices in 13 U.S. cities: Atlanta, Boston, Charlotte, Chicago, Dallas, Houston, Los Angeles (two offices), Miami, New York, Sacramento, San Francisco, Seattle, and Washington, DC. The firm has four international locations, including Hong Kong, Melbourne, Milan, Sydney, and London.

== History ==
=== Early years ===
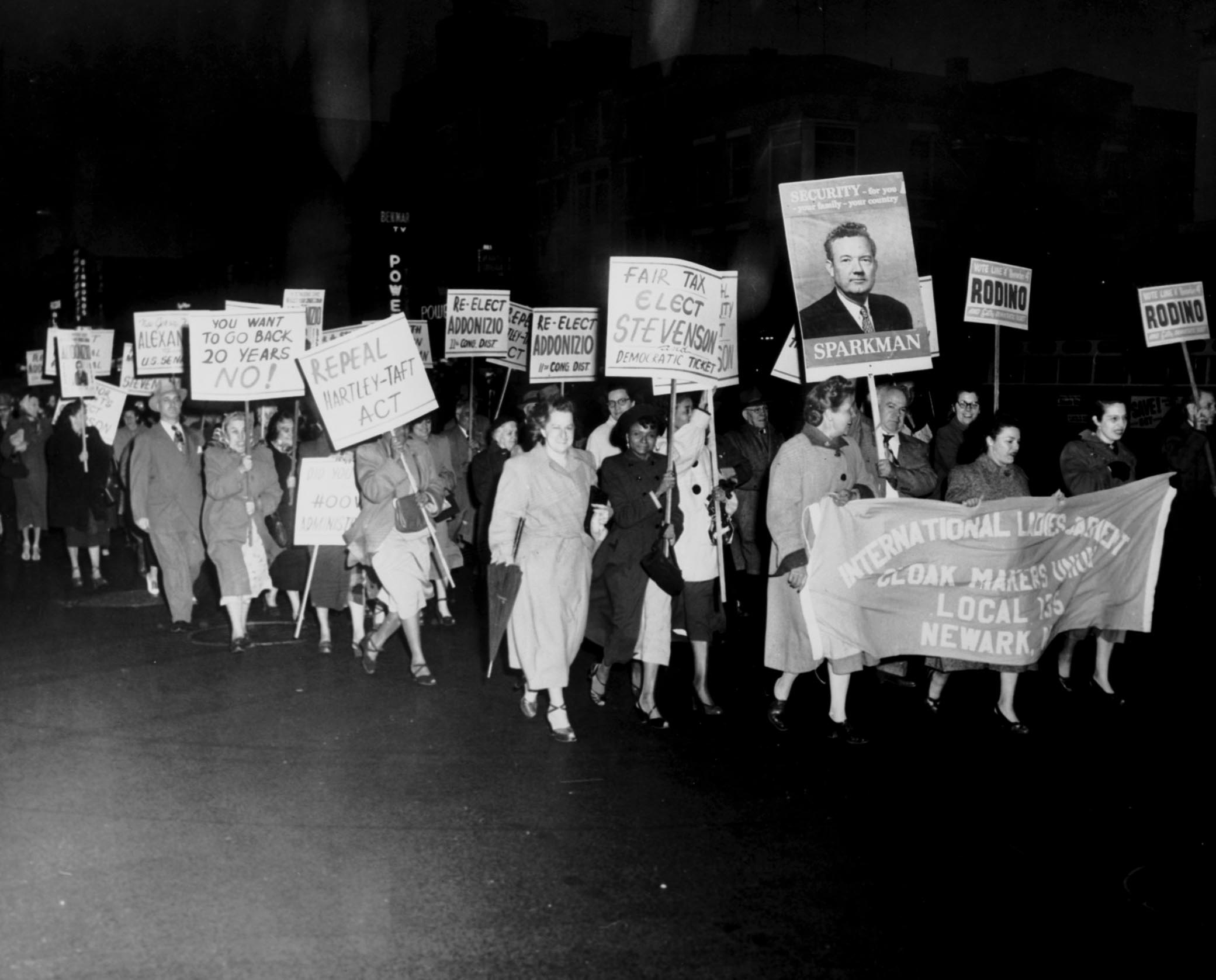
1952 political march by the International Ladies Garment Workers Union. Among their signs is "Repeal Hartley–Taft Act".

Attorneys Henry Seyfarth, Lee C. Shaw, and Owen Fairweather established Seyfarth Shaw in Chicago in 1945. All three attorneys met while associates at the firm of Pope & Ballard which originally focused on the area of labor law.

- Henry Seyfarth (1908–1991) graduated from the University of Illinois in 1928 and two years later received his J.D. degree from the University of Chicago Law School. He served as an assistant state’s attorney in Cook County from 1930 to 1935 and as partner of the law firm Pope & Ballard from 1935 to 1945 before joining with Shaw and Fairweather to launch their own firm. While at Pope & Ballard, he, along with Shaw and Fairweather, represented corporate clients.
- Lee Shaw (1913–1999) was born in Red Wing, Minnesota. He later enrolled at the University of Michigan where he played football as an offensive and defensive lineman alongside future President Gerald Ford. He later earned a J.D. degree from the University of Chicago in 1938. Following the passage of the Wagner Act in 1935, which established the rights of workers to bargain collectively, Pope & Ballard set out to create a specialty in the field of labor law, concentrating on representing corporate and management interests in labor relations. Shaw helped draft the Labor Management Relations Act of 1947, also known as the Taft-Hartley Act. He was named to the drafting panel after serving on the National War Labor Board, which was responsible for monitoring labor issues in World War II.
- Owen Fairweather (1914–1987) earned his undergraduate degree from Dartmouth College in 1935 where he was a member of the Psi Upsilon Fraternity. He then graduated cum laude from the University of Chicago Law School in 1938. He served on the National War Labor Board in Washington, D.C., during World War II. In 1945, he and his two colleagues, Henry Seyfarth and Lee Shaw, left Pope & Ballard to form their own firm, taking their corporate clients with them. The Owen Fairweather Scholarship Fund at the University of Chicago Law School was established in 1987.

=== National and international expansion ===
By 1964, the firm was known as Seyfarth, Shaw, Fairweather & Geraldson, having incorporated the name of partner Ray Geraldson.

In 1971, the firm established a presence in Washington, D.C. and expanded into legislative and regulatory affairs.

After years of strikes, picketing, boycotts and solidarity actions in support of California farmworkers — such as the Delano grape strike and the Salad Bowl strike — the firm opened an office in Los Angeles in 1973, seeking to represent farmowners in labor negotiations against United Farm Workers. The struggle ultimately led to the enactment of the California Agricultural Labor Relations Act, which established the right to collective bargaining for farmworkers in that state.

The firm further expanded throughout the 1970s and 1980s, opening offices in New York City (1978) and San Francisco (1984).

In 1990, the firm opened its first international office in Brussels, Belgium in order to assist corporate clients in the European Economic Community. The firm further expanded through the 1990s, opening offices in Sacramento (1990), Houston (1995), Atlanta (1996).

In 1999, the firm established a Boston office after recruiting seven lawyers. The office expanded in 2001 after a merger with Boston-based firm Chappell White LLP.

Wanting to change the perception that it "only did employment law and only practiced in Chicago," the firm rebranded in 1999 and shortened its name to Seyfarth Shaw.

The Atlanta office expanded in 2000 when Atlanta-based law firm McCullough Sherrill was acquired, giving the firm a broader presence in the southeast. The acquisition added 40 attorneys and expanded capabilities in corporate, litigation, and commercial real estate.

The firm merged with fellow Chicago firm D’Ancona & Pflaum LLC in 2003 adding 60 attorneys, including 34 partners, to the firm's roster. The merger diversified and expanded practices areas including corporate, litigation, and real estate.

In 2009, the firm opened a second office in downtown Los Angeles. Charlotte followed in 2019, then Seattle in 2020. A Dallas office opened in 2023.

=== 21st century ===
The firm further expanded internationally in the 2010s, opening offices in:

- London, United Kingdom (2010)
- Melbourne, Australia (2013)
- Sydney, Australia (2013)
- Shanghai, China (2013)
- Hong Kong, China (2017)

An acquisition of nearly two dozen attorneys from Atlanta-based Morris, Manning & Martin to the Atlanta office in 2025 expanded the firm’s national transactional footprint across middle market corporate, hospitality, real estate private equity, fund formation, and tax practices.

Amid geopolitical tensions and an exodus of American law firms from mainland China, the Shanghai office was closed in 2025.

In 2026, the New York-based boutique firm Mukasey Young dissolved to join Seyfarth. The trial-focused team expanded the firm’s capabilities in white collar defense, complex litigation, and health care regulatory matters.

== Emphasis on legal innovation ==
Starting in 2004, managing partner J. Stephen Poor began encouraging the use of sophisticated management systems to drive efficiency as a way to modernize legal service delivery. The following year, Poor championed the launch of SeyfarthLean, a team of 15 project managers dedicated to applying lean principles to legal work. In 2008, the firm launched SeyfarthLean Consulting, which offered process improvement services to clients and their in-house legal departments.

The firm established a Legal Technology Innovations Office in 2012 to explore how software could enhance client-facing legal services. This initiative led to the creation of Seyfarth Labs in 2016, bringing together 21 lawyers and software engineers to develop new tools and platforms. Seyfarth Labs became one of the first innovation incubators launched within a law firm. Some of the projects launched by the Seyfarth Labs team includes automated contract and discovery templates, a real-time COVID-19 resource tracker, and digital intake tools supporting the transition to electric vehicles.

In 2017, Seyfarth partnered with software company Blue Prism to develop robotic process automation (RPA) solutions designed to handle repetitive tasks, freeing attorneys to focus on more strategic legal work.

The firm has been recognized for legal innovation and business process improvement. They were among the first to embrace Lean Six Sigma in legal project management, an initiative later profiled in a Harvard Law School case study.

In 2024, the firm invited its attorneys and professional staff to propose solutions to pressing legal or business issues. The inaugural competition generated 59 submissions, including an AI-assisted pre-bill review tool, an AI-enhanced playbook for client and deal teams, and contextualized training modules for associates. The winning project was later developed into a practical tool by Seyfarth Labs. A second internal competition was held in 2025.

== Awards and recognition ==
- Financial Times US Innovative Lawyers, 40 Most Innovative Law Firms (2013)
- International Legal Technology Association (ILTA), Innovative Law Firm of the Year (2013)
- International Legal Technology Association (ILTA), Innovative Project of the Year (2013)
- Boston Business Journal, Best Places to Work, (2025)
- Crain’s New York Business, Best Places to Work in New York City (2025)
- Law360 Practice Groups of the Year, Government contracts and Construction (2025)
- Chambers USA, Band 1 for Construction, Labor & Employment, and Retail (2025)
- Los Angeles Times Top 25 Real Estate Law Firms in Los Angeles County (2025)
- The Southeastern Legal Awards, Labor & Employment Litigation Department of the Year (2025)
- Doyle’s Guide, Leading Employment & Labor Law Firm in Hong Kong, 2025
- Bloomberg Law, Top 20 Leading Law Firms (2025)
- The Financial Times Most Innovative Lawyers in North America Award, Knowledge and Data Category (2025)
- American Lawyer named Lorie Almon Managing Partner of the Year at the 2025 ALM Women, Influence & Power in Law Awards.

== Notable lawyers and alumni ==
- Marshall Babson, former board member of the National Labor Relations Board (1985–1988)
- James R. Cho, U.S. Magistrate Judge, Eastern District of New York
- Larry DiNardo, former professional football player and All-American college football player at University of Notre Dame
- Harry T. Edwards, Senior Judge of the United States Court of Appeals for the District of Columbia Circuit and professor of law at the New York University School of Law
- John N. Erlenborn, former member of the U.S. House of Representatives from 1965 to 1985.
- Jonathan J. C. Grey, Judge of the United States District Court for the Eastern District of Michigan
- Laurie Robinson Haden, founder of Corporate Counsel Women of Color
- J.P. Hanlon, Judge of the United States District Court for the Southern District of Indiana
- Marcia M. Henry, U.S. Magistrate Judge, Eastern District of New York
- Ronald A. Lindsay, president and CEO of the Center for Inquiry
- Victoria Lipnic, former Assistant Secretary of Labor and former Commissioner of the U.S. Equal Employment Opportunity Commission (EEOC)
- Edward McCaffery, tax law professor at the University of Southern California Law School (USC) and the California Institute of Technology(Caltech)
- Philip A. Miscimarra, former chairman of the National Labor Relations Board (NLRB)
- Marc Mukasey, former prosecutor for U.S. Attorney’s Office in the Southern District of New York
- Alexander Passantino, acting wage and hour administrator for the Department of Labor under President George W. Bush[ii]
- Leon Rodriguez, former Director of the United States Citizenship and Immigration Services and former Director the Office for Civil Rights of the United States Department of Health and Human Services.
- Myra C. Selby, former associate justice of the Indiana Supreme Court and former nominee to the United States Court of Appeals for the Seventh Circuit
- Dan Ugaste, member of the Illinois House of Representatives for the 65th district
- C.J. Williams, chief United States District Judge of the United States District Court for the Northern District of Iowa
- Adrian Zuckerman, former U.S. Ambassador to Romania

== Rankings ==
The American Lawyer ranks Seyfarth 61st on its annual AmLaw 200 ranking of the largest U.S. law firms by revenue. The National Law Journal's "NLJ 500" 2025 list ranks Seyfarth 63rd among the largest law firms in the United States. Top Legal 500, U.S. News & World Report and Best Lawyers 2025 “Best Law Firms” awarded Seyfarth’s IP group a National Tier 1 ranking.
