= Cale James Holder =

American judge

Judge of the United States District Court for the Southern District of Indiana
- In office August 6, 1954 – August 23, 1983
- Appointed by: Dwight D. Eisenhower
- Preceded by: Seat established by 68 Stat. 8
- Succeeded by: Sarah Evans Barker

Personal details
- Born: Cale James Holder; April 5, 1912 Lawrenceville, Illinois
- Died: August 23, 1983 (aged 71)
- Education: Indiana University Robert H. McKinney School of Law (LL.B., J.D.)

Cale James Holder (April 5, 1912 – August 23, 1983) was a United States district judge of the United States District Court for the Southern District of Indiana.

== Education and career ==
Born in Lawrenceville, Illinois, Holder received a Bachelor of Laws from Benjamin Harrison Law School (now Indiana University Robert H. McKinney School of Law) in 1934, and a Juris Doctor from Indiana Law School (also now Indiana University Robert H. McKinney School of Law) in 1938. He was in private practice in Indianapolis, Indiana from 1934 to 1954. He was a deputy prosecutor for the 19th Judicial Circuit, Marion County Criminal Court in Indiana from 1940 to 1942. He served as a lieutenant in the United States Navy during World War II, from 1942 to 1946. He was a special attorney of the Indiana State Personnel Board from 1946 to 1949, and was a deputy state attorney general of Indiana in 1953.

== Federal judicial service ==
On August 2, 1954, Holder was nominated by President Dwight D. Eisenhower to a new seat on the United States District Court for the Southern District of Indiana created by 68 Stat. 8. He was confirmed by the United States Senate on August 6, 1954, and received his commission the same day. Holder served in that capacity until his death on August 23, 1983.

== Sources ==
Legal offices
Preceded by Seat established by 68 Stat. 8	Judge of the United States District Court for the Southern District of Indiana; 1954–1983	Succeeded by Sarah Evans Barker
