= James Ellsworth Noland =

American judge (1920–1992)

James E. Noland
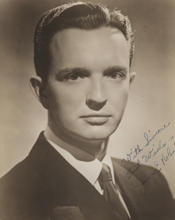

Presiding Judge of the United States Foreign Intelligence Surveillance Court
- In office May 19, 1988 – May 18, 1990
- Appointed by: William Rehnquist
- Preceded by: John Lewis Smith Jr.
- Succeeded by: Joyce Hens Green

Senior Judge of the United States District Court for the Southern District of Indiana
- In office December 31, 1986 – August 12, 1992

Chief Judge of the United States District Court for the Southern District of Indiana
- In office June 9, 1984 – December 31, 1986
- Preceded by: Samuel Hugh Dillin
- Succeeded by: Gene Edward Brooks

Judge of the United States District Court for the Southern District of Indiana
- In office November 3, 1966 – December 31, 1986
- Appointed by: Lyndon B. Johnson
- Preceded by: Seat established by 80 Stat. 75
- Succeeded by: John Daniel Tinder

Member of the U.S. House of Representatives from Indiana's 7th district
- In office January 3, 1949 – January 3, 1951
- Preceded by: Gerald W. Landis
- Succeeded by: William G. Bray

Personal details
- Born: James Ellsworth Noland; April 22, 1920 La Grange, Missouri, U.S.
- Died: August 12, 1992 (aged 72) Indianapolis, Indiana, U.S.
- Resting place: Crown Hill Cemetery and Arboretum, Section 212, Lot 177
- Party: Democratic
- Education: Indiana University Bloomington (A.B.); Harvard University (M.B.A.); Indiana University Maurer School of Law (J.D.)

James Ellsworth Noland (April 22, 1920 – August 12, 1992) was a United States representative from Indiana and a United States district judge of the United States District Court for the Southern District of Indiana.

== Education ==
Born in La Grange, Missouri, Noland received an Artium Baccalaureus degree from Indiana University Bloomington in 1942 and a Master of Business Administration from Harvard Graduate School of Business Administration in 1943. He was in the United States Army during World War II, from 1943 to 1946. He received a Juris Doctor from Indiana University Maurer School of Law in 1948.

== Career ==
Noland was an unsuccessful Democratic candidate for election to the Eightieth Congress from Indiana in 1946. He was in private practice in Bloomington, Indiana, from 1948 to 1949. He was a United States representative from Indiana from 1949 to 1951. He ran unsuccessfully for reelection in 1950. He was in private practice in Indianapolis, Indiana, from 1951 to 1966. During that time, he also served as an assistant state attorney general of Indiana in 1952, and as an Indiana state election commissioner in 1954. He was an assistant city attorney of Indianapolis in 1956, and a first assistant city attorney of Indianapolis from 1956 to 1957. He was a member of the Indiana State Election Board from 1958 to 1966.

== Federal judicial service ==
On October 6, 1966, Noland was nominated by President Lyndon B. Johnson to a new seat on the United States District Court for the Southern District of Indiana created by 80 Stat. 75. He was confirmed by the United States Senate on October 20, 1966, and received his commission on November 3, 1966. He served as Chief Judge from 1984 to 1986, assuming senior status on December 31, 1986. He was a Judge of the Foreign Intelligence Surveillance Court from 1983 to 1990 and Presiding Judge of that court from 1988 to 1990. Noland remained in senior status until his death, on August 12, 1992, in Indianapolis. He was interred in that city's Crown Hill Cemetery.

== Sources ==
- United States Congress. "James Ellsworth Noland (id: N000129)". Biographical Directory of the United States Congress.
- Biography of James Ellsworth Noland

U.S. House of Representatives
Preceded by Gerald W. Landis	Member of the United States House of Representatives from Indiana's 7th congressional district 1949–1951	Succeeded by William G. Bray
Legal offices
Preceded by Seat established by 80 Stat. 75	Judge of the United States District Court for the Southern District of Indiana; 1966–1986	Succeeded by John Daniel Tinder
Preceded by Samuel Hugh Dillin	Chief Judge of the United States District Court for the Southern District of Indiana; 1984–1986	Succeeded by Gene Edward Brooks
Preceded by John Lewis Smith Jr.	Presiding Judge of the United States Foreign Intelligence Surveillance Court; 1988–1990	Succeeded by Joyce Hens Green
