= Tanya Walton Pratt =

American judge for Southern District of Indiana

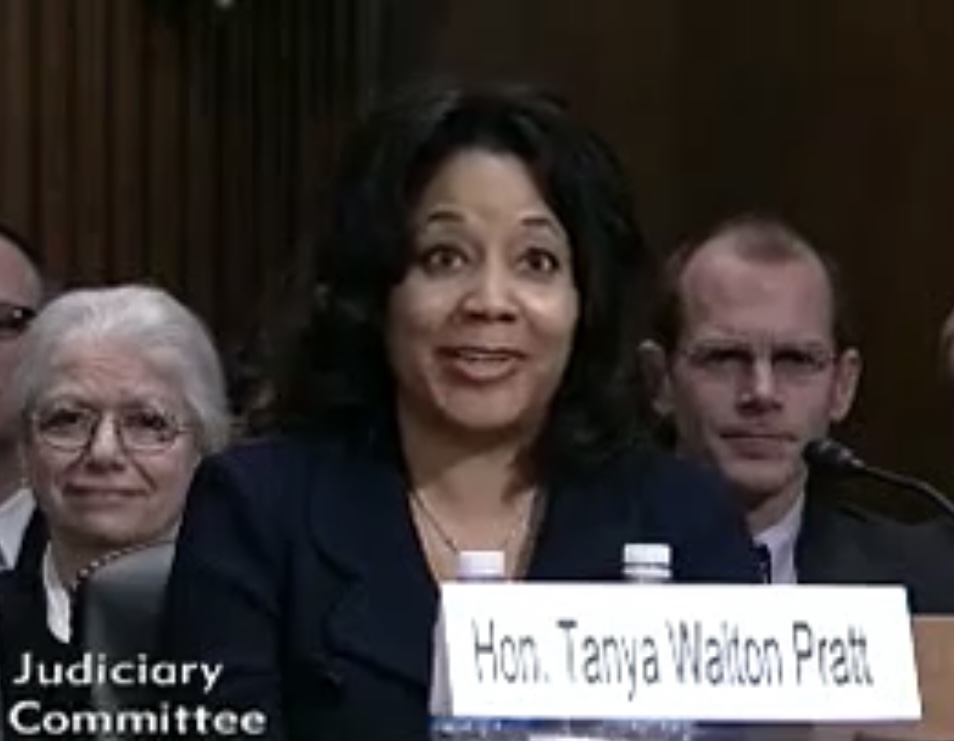
- Pratt in 2010

Chief Judge of the United States District Court for the Southern District of Indiana
- In office March 20, 2021 – July 11, 2025
- Preceded by: Jane Magnus-Stinson
- Succeeded by: James R. Sweeney II

Judge of the United States District Court for the Southern District of Indiana
- Incumbent
- Assumed office June 15, 2010
- Appointed by: Barack Obama
- Preceded by: David Hamilton

Judge of the Marion County Superior Court
- In office 1997–2010
- Constituency: Criminal Division (1997-2008); Probate Division (2009-2010)

Personal details
- Born: Tanya Marie Walton Indianapolis, Indiana, U.S.
- Education: Spelman College (BA); Howard University (JD)

Tanya Marie Walton Pratt is a United States district judge of the United States District Court for the Southern District of Indiana.

== Early life and education ==
Born in Indianapolis, Indiana, Pratt graduated from Cathedral High School, then went on to earn a Bachelor of Arts degree from Spelman College in 1981 and a Juris Doctor from Howard University School of Law in 1984.

== Career ==
In 1981 she was a security guard at Brink's in Atlanta, Georgia. In 1982 she was a summer intern for the center township assessor's office in Indianapolis, Indiana. From 1986 to 1991 she was a deputy public defender for Marion County, Indiana. From 1993 to 1996 she was a pro tempore judge for the Marion County Superior Court. From 1984 until 1992, Pratt worked as an associate attorney for the Moss & Walton law firm in Indianapolis. From 1992 until 1996, Pratt was with the same firm with the title of attorney. In 1997, Pratt became a judge in Marion County, Indiana, working in the Criminal Division and presiding over major felony matters from 1997 until 2008. She was assigned to Marion County's probate court in 2009, and served there from 2009 until 2010.

=== Federal judicial service ===
In March 2009, Pratt expressed her interest in a federal judgeship to the staff of Indiana Senator Evan Bayh. After interviewing with representatives from the United States Department of Justice and the Office of the White House Counsel, Pratt was nominated by President Barack Obama to the judgeship on January 20, 2010. Pratt filled the vacancy that was created by Judge David F. Hamilton, who was elevated to the United States Court of Appeals for the Seventh Circuit. The Senate confirmed Pratt by a 95–0 vote on June 15, 2010. She received her commission the same day. Pratt is the first African American federal judge in Indiana's history. She became chief judge on March 20, 2021, until on July 11, 2025. With her swearing in, she became the first African-American chief judge of the Southern District of Indiana.

=== Notable rulings ===
- In 2016, she ruled against Governor Mike Pence's order to cut federally allocated funds for the resettlement of Syrian refugees in Indiana.
- In 2018, she ruled against a pregnant woman who was mauled by a police dog because she was not the intended target.

=== Notable cases ===
- U.S. v. Jared Fogle, Case No. 1:15-cr-159 (2015)

== See also ==
- List of African-American federal judges
- List of African-American jurists
- List of first women lawyers and judges in Indiana

Legal offices
Preceded by David Hamilton	Judge of the United States District Court for the Southern District of Indiana; 2010–present	Incumbent
Preceded by Jane Magnus-Stinson	Chief Judge of the United States District Court for the Southern District of Indiana; 2021–2025	Succeeded by James R. Sweeney II
