= Sarah Evans Barker =

American judge (born 1943)

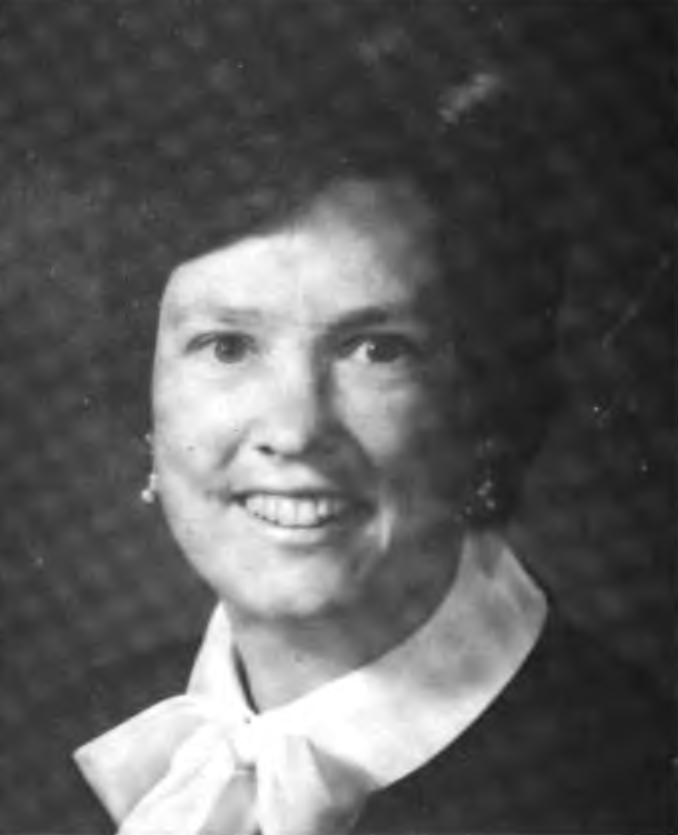

Senior Judge of the United States District Court for the Southern District of Indiana
- Incumbent
- Assumed office June 30, 2014

Chief Judge of the United States District Court for the Southern District of Indiana
- In office 1994–2000
- Preceded by: Gene Edward Brooks
- Succeeded by: Larry J. McKinney

Judge of the United States District Court for the Southern District of Indiana
- In office March 14, 1984 – June 30, 2014
- Appointed by: Ronald Reagan
- Preceded by: Cale James Holder
- Succeeded by: James R. Sweeney II

United States Attorney for the Southern District of Indiana
- In office 1981–1984
- President: Ronald Reagan
- Preceded by: Virginia Dill McCarty
- Succeeded by: John Daniel Tinder

Personal details
- Born: Sarah Elizabeth Evans; June 10, 1943 (age 83) Mishawaka, Indiana, U.S.
- Education: Indiana University, Bloomington (BS); American University (JD)

Sarah Evans Barker (born June 10, 1943) is a senior United States district judge of the United States District Court for the Southern District of Indiana.

== Education and career ==
Born in Mishawaka, Indiana, Barker received a Bachelor of Science degree from Indiana University Bloomington in 1965 and a Juris Doctor from American University Washington College of Law in 1969. She was a legislative assistant for United States Representative Gilbert Gude in 1969 and for United States Senator Charles H. Percy from 1969 to 1971. She was a special counsel to the United States Senate Government Operations Committee, permanent Subcommittee on Investigations in Washington, D.C. from 1971 to 1972. She was a director of research and director of scheduling and advance to Senator Percy's re-election campaign in 1972. She then served as an Assistant United States Attorney in the Southern District of Indiana from 1972 to 1976, and as a First Assistant United States Attorney from 1976 to 1977. She was in private practice in Indianapolis, Indiana from 1977 to 1981. She was the United States Attorney for the Southern District of Indiana from 1981 to 1984. In 2012, Barker received the Benjamin Harrison Presidential Site Advancing American Democracy Award.

== Federal judicial service ==
On February 14, 1984, Barker was nominated by President Ronald Reagan to a seat on the United States District Court for the Southern District of Indiana vacated by Judge Cale James Holder. Barker was confirmed by the United States Senate on March 13, 1984, and received her commission the following day, becoming the first female federal judge in Indiana. She served as Chief Judge from 1994 to 2000. Barker assumed senior status effective June 30, 2014.

In April 2006, Barker granted summary judgment in favor of Indiana Secretary of State Todd Rokita in a case challenging Indiana's Voter ID law. Barker was affirmed by SCOTUS in Crawford v. Marion County Election Board.

== See also ==
  - List of first women lawyers and judges in Indiana

== Sources ==
- Confirmation hearings on federal appointments : hearings before the Committee on the Judiciary, United States Senate, Ninety-eighth Congress, first session-second session on confirmation hearings on appointments to the federal judiciary and the Department of Justice. pt.3 (1985)

Legal offices
Preceded by Cale James Holder	Judge of the United States District Court for the Southern District of Indiana; 1984–2014	Succeeded by James R. Sweeney II
Preceded by Gene Edward Brooks	Chief Judge of the United States District Court for the Southern District of Indiana; 1994–2000	Succeeded by Larry J. McKinney
