= William Elwood Steckler =

American judge (1913–1995)

Senior Judge of the United States District Court for the Southern District of Indiana
- In office December 31, 1986 – March 8, 1995

Chief Judge of the United States District Court for the Southern District of Indiana
- In office 1954–1982
- Preceded by: Office established
- Succeeded by: Samuel Hugh Dillin

Judge of the United States District Court for the Southern District of Indiana
- In office April 7, 1950 – December 31, 1986
- Appointed by: Harry S. Truman
- Preceded by: Robert C. Baltzell
- Succeeded by: Larry J. McKinney

Personal details
- Born: William Elwood Steckler; October 18, 1913 Mount Vernon, Indiana, U.S.
- Died: March 8, 1995 (aged 81) Indianapolis, Indiana, U.S.
- Education: Indiana University School of Law (LL.B., J.D.)

William Elwood Steckler (October 18, 1913 – March 8, 1995) was a United States district judge of the United States District Court for the Southern District of Indiana.

== Education and career ==
Born in Mount Vernon, Indiana, Steckler received a Bachelor of Laws from Indiana University School of Law in 1936 and a Juris Doctor from the same institution in 1937. He was in private practice in Indianapolis, Indiana from 1937 to 1950. He was a United States Navy Reserve officer during World War II in 1943. He was a member of the Marion County Election Board from 1946 to 1947, and of the Indiana State Election Board from 1947 to 1948. He was a public counselor of Indiana from 1949 to 1950.

== Federal judicial service ==
On February 14, 1950, Steckler was nominated by President Harry S. Truman to a seat on the United States District Court for the Southern District of Indiana vacated by Judge Robert C. Baltzell. Steckler was confirmed by the United States Senate on April 4, 1950, and received his commission on April 7, 1950. He served as Chief Judge from 1954 to 1982 and as a member of the Judicial Conference of the United States from 1962 to 1964. He assumed senior status on December 31, 1986, serving in that capacity until his death on March 8, 1995, at his Indianapolis home from non-Hodgkin's lymphoma.

== Other service ==
Steckler was also an adjunct faculty member of the Indiana University Maurer School of Law from 1975 to 1979.

== See also ==
- List of United States federal judges by longevity of service

== Sources ==
- Wolfgang Saxon, "W. E. Steckler, 81, U.S. District Judge Serving 45th Year", The New York Times (March 11, 1995).

Legal offices
Preceded by Robert C. Baltzell	Judge of the United States District Court for the Southern District of Indiana; 1950–1986	Succeeded by Larry J. McKinney
Preceded by Office established	Chief Judge of the United States District Court for the Southern District of Indiana; 1954–1982	Succeeded by Samuel Hugh Dillin
