= Justin R. Olson =

American judge (born 1987)

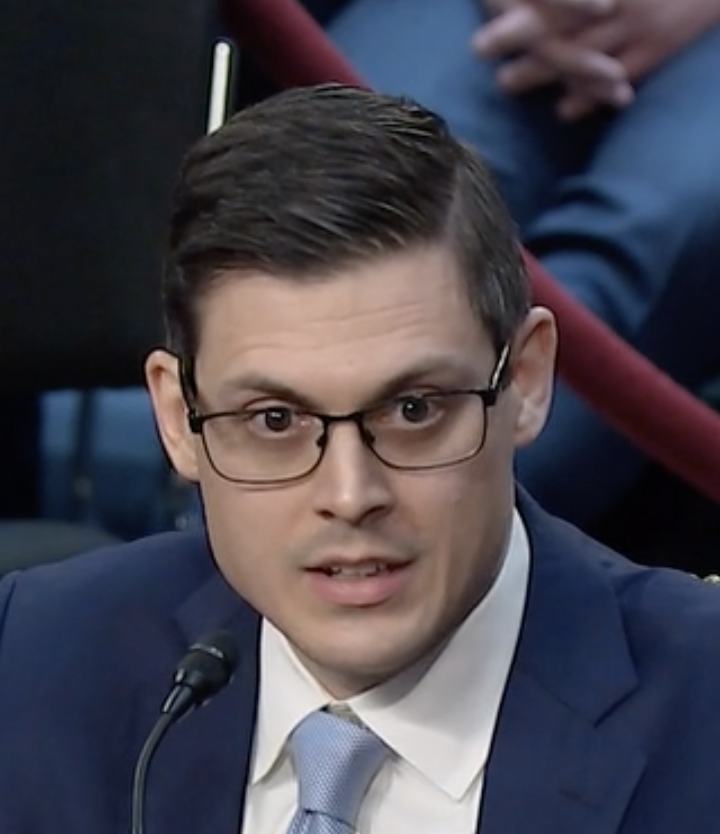

Judge of the United States District Court for the Southern District of Indiana
- Incumbent
- Assumed office February 18, 2026
- Appointed by: Donald Trump
- Preceded by: Jane Magnus-Stinson

Personal details
- Born: Justin Ross Olson; 1987 (age 38–39) Milwaukee, Wisconsin, U.S.
- Education: Grove City College (BA); Indiana University Bloomington (JD)

Justin Ross Olson (born 1987) is a United States district judge of the United States District Court for the Southern District of Indiana. Prior to his judicial tenure he was a lawyer in private practice as counsel at the law firm of Kroger, Gardis & Regas, LLP.

== Early life and education ==
Olson received a Bachelor of Arts degree, summa cum laude, in 2010 from Grove City College. He received a Juris Doctor, magna cum laude, in 2013 from the Indiana University Maurer School of Law.

== Career ==
Olson served as an assistant United States attorney in the Civil Division for the United States Attorney's Office for the Southern District of Indiana and was promoted to Health Care Fraud Coordinator. He later served as counsel at the law firm of Kroger, Gardis & Regas, LLP in Indianapolis.

=== Notable cases ===
Olson was one of the lawyers who represented former UPenn swimmers Grace Estabrook, Margot Kaczorowski, and Ellen Holmquist in a lawsuit against the University of Pennsylvania, Harvard, the Ivy League and NCAA for giving preferential treatment to transgender swimmer Lia Thomas in athletic events.

=== Federal judicial service ===
On November 14, 2025, President Donald Trump announced his intention to nominate Olson to a seat on the United States District Court for the Southern District of Indiana vacated by Judge Jane Magnus-Stinson. On December 17, 2025, the U.S. Senate Judiciary Committee held a hearing on his nomination. On January 15, 2026, the Committee advanced his nomination on a 12–10 vote. The Senate confirmed Olson on January 5, 2026, by a 50–47 vote. He received his judicial commission on February 18, 2026.

Legal offices
Preceded by Jane Magnus-Stinson	Judge of the United States District Court for the Southern District of Indiana; 2026–present	Incumbent
