= Doris Pryor =

American judge (born 1977)

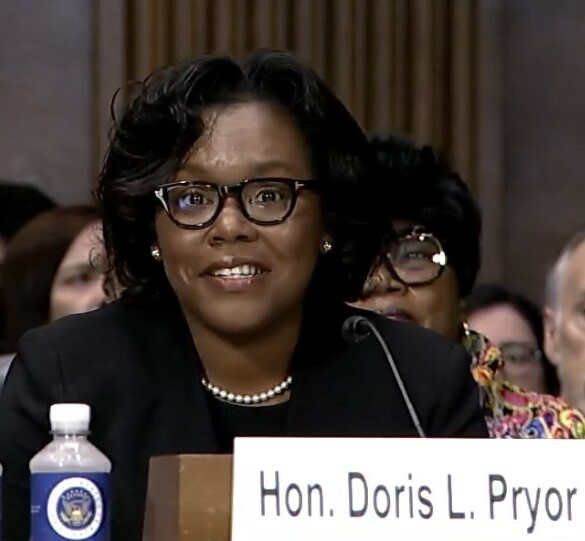

Judge of the United States Court of Appeals for the Seventh Circuit
- Incumbent
- Assumed office December 9, 2022
- Appointed by: Joe Biden
- Preceded by: David Hamilton

Personal details
- Born: Doris Lenea Clark; 1977 (age 48–49) Hope, Arkansas, U.S.
- Education: University of Central Arkansas (BS); Indiana University, Bloomington (JD)

Doris Lenea Pryor (née Clark; born 1977) is an American lawyer who has served as a United States circuit judge of the United States Court of Appeals for the Seventh Circuit since 2022. She served as a United States magistrate judge for the United States District Court for the Southern District of Indiana from 2018 to 2022.

== Education ==
Pryor was born in Hope, Arkansas. She graduated from the University of Central Arkansas in 1999 with a Bachelor of Science, cum laude. She worked at a construction company from 1999 to 2000. She then attended the Indiana University Maurer School of Law, where she was an editor of the Federal Communications Law Journal and won the top oralist award at the school's moot court competition. She graduated in 2003 with a Juris Doctor.

== Career ==
After graduating law school, Pryor served as a law clerk for Chief Judge Lavenski Smith of the United States Court of Appeals for the Eighth Circuit from 2003 to 2004 and for Judge James Leon Holmes of the United States District Court for the Eastern District of Arkansas from 2004 to 2005. From 2005 to 2006, she served as Deputy Public Defender for the Arkansas Public Defender's Commission. From 2006 to 2018, she served as an Assistant United States Attorney for the United States Attorney's Office for the Southern District of Indiana. She served as National Security Chief for the office from 2014 to 2018. Pryor co-founded the REACH program, a re-entry program that guides and supports former offenders who are at greater risk of returning to prison, in the Southern Indiana District Court.

=== Federal judicial service ===
On November 17, 2017, Pryor was selected to serve as a United States magistrate judge to fill the vacancy left by the death of Magistrate Judge Denise K. LaRue. She served as United States magistrate judge for the United States District Court for the Southern District of Indiana from March 1, 2018 to December 9, 2022, and was later succeeded by Kendra Klump.

On May 25, 2022, President Joe Biden nominated Pryor to serve as a United States circuit judge for the United States Court of Appeals for the Seventh Circuit. President Biden nominated Pryor to the seat to be vacated by Judge David Hamilton, who announced his intent to assume senior status upon confirmation of his successor. Senator Todd Young announced his support of Pryor's nomination in a statement shortly after President Biden nominated her. On July 13, 2022, a hearing on her nomination was held before the Senate Judiciary Committee. She was the first of Biden's court of appeals nominees to receive support from a state's two Republican senators. On August 4, 2022, her nomination was favorably reported by the committee by a 13–9 vote. On November 28, 2022, Majority Leader Chuck Schumer filed cloture on her nomination. On December 1, 2022, the United States Senate invoked cloture on her nomination by a 62–31 vote. On December 5, 2022, her nomination was confirmed by a 60–31 vote. She became the first African American woman from Indiana to serve on the 7th Circuit. She received her judicial commission on December 9, 2022. Pryor was the ninth African American woman confirmed as a United States circuit judge nominated by President Biden.

== See also ==
- List of African American federal judges
- List of African American jurists

Legal offices
Preceded by David Hamilton	Judge of the United States Court of Appeals for the Seventh Circuit; 2022–present	Incumbent
