= Richard L. Young =

American judge (born 1953)

Richard Young

Senior Judge of the United States District Court for the Southern District of Indiana
- Incumbent
- Assumed office March 31, 2023

Chief Judge of the United States District Court for the Southern District of Indiana
- In office November 23, 2009 – November 23, 2016
- Preceded by: David Hamilton
- Succeeded by: Jane Magnus-Stinson

Judge of the United States District Court for the Southern District of Indiana
- In office March 6, 1998 – March 31, 2023
- Appointed by: Bill Clinton
- Preceded by: Gene Edward Brooks
- Succeeded by: Matthew P. Brookman

Personal details
- Born: Richard Lee Young; January 3, 1953 (age 73) Davenport, Iowa, U.S.
- Education: Drake University (BA); George Mason University (JD)

Richard Lee Young (born January 3, 1953) is a senior United States district judge of the United States District Court for the Southern District of Indiana.

== Education and career ==
Born in Davenport, Iowa, Young received a Bachelor of Arts degree from Drake University in 1975 and a Juris Doctor from George Mason University School of Law in 1980. He was in private practice in Evansville, Indiana from 1980 to 1990, also serving as a public defender (part-time) for the Vanderburgh Circuit Court from 1983 to 1985, and as corporation counsel to the City of Evansville, from 1985 to 1987. He was a circuit judge of the Vanderburgh Circuit Court from 1990 to 1998.

== Federal judicial service ==
On July 15, 1997, Young was nominated by President Bill Clinton to a seat on the United States District Court for the Southern District of Indiana vacated by Gene Edward Brooks. The United States Senate confirmed Young by an 81–0 vote on March 2, 1998. He received his commission on March 6, 1998. He served as Chief Judge from 2009 to 2016. He assumed senior status on March 31, 2023.

On June 25, 2014, Judge Young struck down Indiana's ban on same-sex marriage without issuing a stay of his ruling. This ruling was affirmed by the United States Court of Appeals for the Seventh Circuit and review was denied by the United States Supreme Court.

In 2021, Judge Young ruled in favor of Roncalli High School after they dismissed a guidance counselor in a same-sex marriage ruling that guidance counselors at a religious school fall under the "ministerial exception" from discrimination based on sexual orientation in employment cases.

On July 28, 2024, Young blocked an Indiana law requiring adult websites to take reasonable precautions to verify the age of their users, arguing that it would be ineffective and constituted a potential violation of privacy.

On September 17, 2024, Young ordered the Indiana Department of Corrections to provide gender-affirming surgery to an inmate convicted of murdering his infant stepdaughter, arguing that not doing so constituted "cruel and unusual punishment" in violation of the Eighth Amendment.

== Sources ==
Legal offices
Preceded by Gene Edward Brooks	Judge of the United States District Court for the Southern District of Indiana; 1998–2023	Succeeded by Matthew P. Brookman
Preceded by David Hamilton	Chief Judge of the United States District Court for the Southern District of Indiana; 2009–2016	Succeeded by Jane Magnus-Stinson
