= Gene Edward Brooks =

American judge (1931–2004)

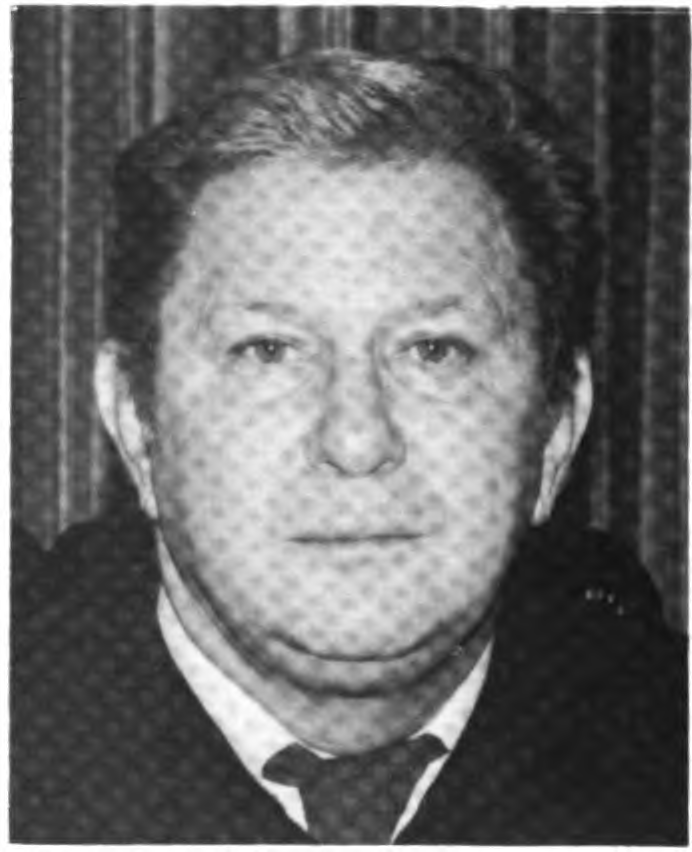

Chief Judge of the United States District Court for the Southern District of Indiana
- In office 1987–1994
- Preceded by: James Ellsworth Noland
- Succeeded by: Sarah Evans Barker

Judge of the United States District Court for the Southern District of Indiana
- In office October 5, 1979 – December 31, 1996
- Appointed by: Jimmy Carter
- Preceded by: Seat established by 92 Stat. 1629
- Succeeded by: Richard L. Young

Personal details
- Born: Gene Edward Brooks; June 21, 1931 Griffin, Indiana, U.S.
- Died: April 19, 2004 (aged 72) Evansville, Indiana, U.S.
- Education: Indiana State University (BS); Indiana University Maurer School of Law (LLB)

Gene Edward Brooks (June 21, 1931 – April 19, 2004) was a United States district judge of the United States District Court for the Southern District of Indiana.

== Education and career ==
Born in Griffin, Indiana, Brooks received a Bachelor of Science degree from Indiana State University in 1953 and was a Lieutenant in the United States Marine Corps from 1953 to 1955. He received a Bachelor of Laws from Indiana University Maurer School of Law in 1958. He was in private practice in Mount Vernon, Indiana from 1958 to 1968. He was a prosecuting attorney of Mount Vernon from 1959 to 1968, and was a Referee in Bankruptcy for the Southern District of Indiana from 1968 to 1973. He became a United States Bankruptcy Judge for that district in 1973, holding that office until 1979.

== Federal judicial service ==
On July 27, 1979, Brooks was nominated by President Jimmy Carter to a new seat on the United States District Court for the Southern District of Indiana, created by 92 Stat. 1629. He was confirmed by the United States Senate on October 4, 1979, and received his commission on October 5, 1979. He served as Chief Judge from 1987 to 1994. His service terminated due to his retirement on December 31, 1996.

== Death ==
Brooks died on April 19, 2004, in Evansville, Indiana.

== Sources ==
Legal offices
Preceded by Seat established by 92 Stat. 1629	Judge of the United States District Court for the Southern District of Indiana; 1979–1996	Succeeded by Richard L. Young
Preceded by James Ellsworth Noland	Chief Judge of the United States District Court for the Southern District of Indiana; 1987–1994	Succeeded by Sarah Evans Barker
