= United States District Court for the Southern District of Indiana =

United States federal district court in Indiana

Coordinates: 39°46′14″N 86°9′25″W

- (S.D. Ind.)
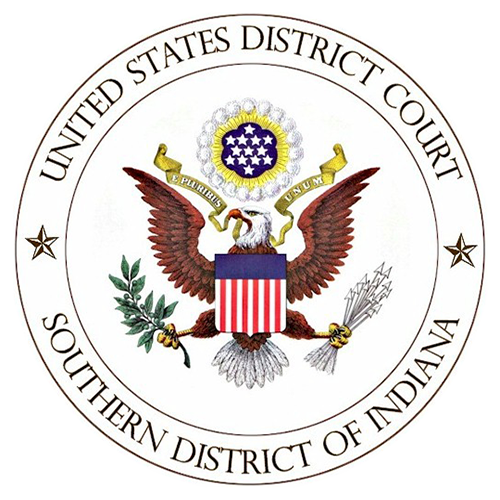
- Location: Birch Bayh Federal Building and U.S. Courthouse (Indianapolis) More locations: United States Courthouse (Terre Haute, Indiana) (Terre Haute); Winfield K. Denton Federal Building & U.S. Courthouse (Evansville); Lee H. Hamilton Federal Building & U.S. Courthouse (New Albany)
- Appeals to: Seventh Circuit
- Established: April 21, 1928
- Judges: 5
- Chief Judge: James R. Sweeney II

Officers of the court
- U.S. Attorney: Thomas E. Wheeler
- U.S. Marshal: Joseph D. McClain
- www.insd.uscourts.gov

The United States District Court for the Southern District of Indiana (in case citations, S.D. Ind.) is a federal district court in Indiana. It was created in 1928 by an act of Congress that split Indiana into two separate districts, northern and southern. The Southern District is divided into four divisions, Indianapolis, Terre Haute, Evansville, and New Albany. Appeals from the Southern District of Indiana are taken to the United States Court of Appeals for the Seventh Circuit (except for patent claims and claims against the U.S. government under the Tucker Act, which are appealed to the Federal Circuit). The court has five judges, four full-time United States magistrate judges and two part-time magistrate judges.

The courtrooms are located in the Birch Bayh Federal Building in Indianapolis.

== History ==
The United States District Court for the District of Indiana was established on March 3, 1817, by 3 Stat. 390. The District was subdivided into Northern and Southern Districts on April 21, 1928, by 45 Stat. 437. Of all district courts to be subdivided, Indiana existed for the longest time as a single court, 111 years.

== Divisions of the Southern District ==
Indianapolis: Bartholomew County, Boone County, Brown County, Clinton County, Decatur County, Delaware County, Fayette County, Fountain County, Franklin County, Hamilton County, Hancock County, Hendricks County, Henry County, Howard County, Johnson County, Madison County, Marion County, Monroe County, Montgomery County, Morgan County, Randolph County, Rush County, Shelby County, Tipton County, Union County, and Wayne County.

Terre Haute: Clay County, Greene County, Knox County, Owen County, Parke County, Putnam County, Sullivan County, Vermillion County, and Vigo County.

Evansville: Daviess County, Dubois County, Gibson County, Martin County, Perry County, Pike County, Posey County, Spencer County, Vanderburgh County, and Warrick County.

New Albany: Clark County, Crawford County, Dearborn County, Floyd County, Harrison County, Jackson County, Jefferson County, Jennings County, Lawrence County, Ohio County, Orange County, Ripley County, Scott County, Switzerland County, and Washington County.

== Current judges ==
As of February 18, 2026:

#	Title	Judge	Duty station	Born	Term of service			Appointed by
#	Title	Judge	Duty station	Born	Active	Chief	Senior	Appointed by
15	Chief Judge	James R. Sweeney II	Indianapolis	1961	2018–present	2025–present	—	Trump
14	District Judge	Tanya Walton Pratt	Indianapolis	1959	2010–present	2021–2025	—	Obama
16	District Judge	J. P. Hanlon	Indianapolis	1970	2018–present	—	—	Trump
17	District Judge	Matthew P. Brookman	Evansville; Indianapolis	1968	2023–present	—	—	Biden
18	District Judge	Justin R. Olson	Indianapolis	1987	2026–present	—	—	Trump
7	Senior Judge	Sarah Evans Barker	Indianapolis	1943	1984–2014	1994–2000	2014–present	Reagan
11	Senior Judge	Richard L. Young	Evansville; Indianapolis	1953	1998–2023	2009–2016	2023–present	Clinton
12	Senior Judge	William T. Lawrence	inactive	1947	2008–2018	—	2018–present	G.W. Bush
13	Senior Judge	Jane Magnus-Stinson	Indianapolis	1958	2010–2024	2016–2021	2024–present	Obama

== Former judges ==
#	Judge	Born–died	Active service	Chief Judge	Senior status	Appointed by	Reason for termination
1	Robert C. Baltzell	1879–1950	1928–1950 (Note: Reassigned from the District of Indiana.)	—	1950	Coolidge/Operation of law	death
2	William Elwood Steckler	1913–1995	1950–1986	1954–1982	1986–1995	Truman	death
3	Cale James Holder	1912–1983	1954–1983	—	—	Eisenhower	death
4	Samuel Hugh Dillin	1914–2006	1961–1993	1982–1984	1993–2006	Kennedy	death
5	James Ellsworth Noland	1920–1992	1966–1986	1984–1986	1986–1992	L. Johnson	death
6	Gene Edward Brooks	1931–2004	1979–1996	1987–1994	—	Carter	retirement
8	Larry J. McKinney	1944–2017	1987–2009	2001–2007	2009–2017	Reagan	death
9	John Daniel Tinder	1950–present	1987–2007	—	—	Reagan	elevation
10	David Hamilton	1957–present	1994–2009	2008–2009	—	Clinton	elevation

== Chief judges ==
Chief judges have administrative responsibilities with respect to their district court. Unlike the Supreme Court, where one justice is specifically nominated to be chief, the office of chief judge rotates among the district court judges. To be chief, a judge must have been in active service on the court for at least one year, be under the age of 65, and have not previously served as chief judge.

A vacancy is filled by the judge highest in seniority among the group of qualified judges. The chief judge serves for a term of seven years, or until age 70, whichever occurs first. The age restrictions are waived if no members of the court would otherwise be qualified for the position.

When the office was created in 1948, the chief judge was the longest-serving judge who had not elected to retire, on what has since 1958 been known as senior status, or declined to serve as chief judge. After August 6, 1959, judges could not become or remain chief after turning 70 years old. The current rules have been in operation since October 1, 1982.

== Succession of seats ==
Seat 1
Seat reassigned from District of Indiana on April 21, 1928 by 45 Stat. 437
Baltzell	1928–1950
Steckler	1950–1986
McKinney	1987–2009
Magnus-Stinson	2010–2024
Olson	2026–present

Seat 2
Seat established on February 10, 1954 by 68 Stat. 8
Holder	1954–1983
Barker	1984–2014
Sweeney II	2018–present

Seat 3
Seat established on May 19, 1961 by 75 Stat. 80
Dillin	1961–1993
Hamilton	1994–2009
Pratt	2010–present

Seat 4
Seat established on March 18, 1966 by 80 Stat. 75
Noland	1966–1986
Tinder	1987–2007
Lawrence	2008–2018
Hanlon	2018–present

Seat 5
Seat established on October 20, 1978 by 92 Stat. 1629
Brooks	1979–1996
Young	1998–2023
Brookman	2023–present

== List of U.S. attorneys since 1929 ==
Name	Term started	Term ended	Presidents served under
George Jeffrey	1929	1933	Herbert Hoover
Val Nolan	1933	1940	Franklin D. Roosevelt
B. Howard Caughran	1940	1950	Franklin D. Roosevelt and Harry S. Truman
Matthew E. Welsh	1950	1952	Harry S. Truman
Marshall Hanley	1952	1953	Harry S. Truman
Jack Brown	1953	1956	Dwight D. Eisenhower
Don Tabbert	1957	1961	Dwight D. Eisenhower
Richard P. Stein	1961	1967	John F. Kennedy and Lyndon B. Johnson
K. Edwin Applegate	1967	1969	Lyndon B. Johnson and Richard M. Nixon
Stanley B. Miller	1970	1974	Richard M. Nixon
John E. Hirschman	1974	1975	Richard M. Nixon and Gerald Ford
James B. Young	1975	1977	Gerald Ford
Virginia Dill McCarty	1977	1981	Jimmy Carter
Sarah Evans Barker	1981	1984	Ronald Reagan
Richard L. Darst	1984	1984	Ronald Reagan
John Daniel Tinder	1984	1987	Ronald Reagan
Bradley L. Williams	1987	1988	Ronald Reagan
Deborah J. Daniels	1988	1993	Ronald Reagan and George H. W. Bush
John J. Thar	1993	1993	George H. W. Bush and Bill Clinton
Judith A. Stewart	1993	2000	Bill Clinton
Timothy M. Morrison	2000	2001	Bill Clinton and George W. Bush
Susan Brooks	2001	2007	George W. Bush
Timothy M. Morrison	2007	2010	George W. Bush and Barack Obama
Joe Hogsett	2010	2014	Barack Obama
Joshua Minkler	2015	2021	Barack Obama and Donald Trump
Zachary A. Myers	2021	2025	Joe Biden
Thomas E. Wheeler	2025	Present	Donald Trump

== See also ==
- Courts of Indiana
- List of current United States district judges
- List of United States federal courthouses in Indiana
