= United States Attorney for the Northern District of Indiana =

The first United States attorney to serve while Indiana was still a territory was Elijah Sparks in 1813. His successor, William Hendricks, witnessed Indiana's admission to the Union as the 19th state in 1816. On April 21, 1928, the federal district for the State of Indiana was divided into the Northern and Southern Judicial Districts, resulting in the creation of the Office of the United States Attorney for the Northern District of Indiana. The Northern District of Indiana consists of the northern 32 counties of the State of Indiana. The district has three staffed offices in Hammond, South Bend and Fort Wayne. By contrast, the State of Indiana has 92 prosecuting attorneys located in each county seat.

The Hammond Division covers Lake and Porter Counties. The South Bend Division covers Cass, Elkhart, Fulton, Kosciusko, LaPorte, Marshall, Miami, Pulaski, St. Joseph, Starke, and Wabash Counties. The Fort Wayne Division covers Adams, Allen, Blackford, Dekalb, Grant, Huntington, Jay, Lagrange, Noble, Steuben, Wells, and Whitley Counties. The Northern District of Indiana also includes the Hammond Division at Lafayette which covers Benton, Carroll, Jasper, Newton, Tippecanoe, Warren, and White Counties.

Joseph S. Van Bokkelen was appointed by President George W. Bush as the 17th United States Attorney for the Northern District of Indiana on September 21, 2001. Van Bokkelen was then appointed a federal judge in 2007. David Capp was appointed Acting United States Attorney for the Northern District of Indiana on July 20, 2007. Prior to his appointment as Acting United States Attorney, he served as the First Assistant U.S. Attorney since 1991, and as federal prosecutor since 1985.

David A. Capp was nominated for United States Attorney on December 23, 2009, confirmed by the Senate on April 22, 2010, and sworn in by Chief Judge Philip Simon as the United States Attorney on April 28, 2010. Prior to that, he served as interim United States Attorney on three occasions. Capp joined the United States Attorney's Office in 1985. From 1991- 2007, he served as the First Assistant, responsible for the day-to-day operations of the office.

== List of U.S. attorneys since 1928 ==
U.S. Attorney	Term started	Term ended	Presidents served under
Oliver Mullins Loomis	1928	1933	Calvin Coolidge and Herbert Hoover
James R. Fleming	1933	1941	Franklin D. Roosevelt
Alexander M. Campbell	1941	1949	Franklin D. Roosevelt and Harry Truman
Gilmore Haynie	1949	1953	Harry Truman
Joseph H. Lesh	1953	1954	Dwight D. Eisenhower
Phil M. McNagny Jr.	1954	1958	Dwight D. Eisenhower
Kenneth C. Raub	1959	1962	Dwight D. Eisenhower and John F. Kennedy
Philip C. Potts	1962	1962	John F. Kennedy
Alfred Moellering	1962	1970	John F. Kennedy and Lyndon B. Johnson and Richard Nixon
William C. Lee	1970	1973	Richard Nixon
John R. Wilks	1973	1977	Richard Nixon and Gerald Ford
David T. Ready	1977	1981	Jimmy Carter
R. Lawrence Steel Jr.	1981	1985	Ronald Reagan
James G. Richmond	1985	1991	Ronald Reagan and George H. W. Bush
John F. Hoehner	1991	1993	George H. W. Bush and Bill Clinton
Jon DeGuilio	1993	1999	Bill Clinton
Joseph S. Van Bokkelen	2001	2007	George W. Bush
David A. Capp	2007	2017	George W. Bush, Barack Obama, and Donald Trump
Thomas Kirsch	2017	2020	Donald Trump
Clifford D. Johnson	2021	2025	Joe Biden
Adam L. Mildred	2025	Incumbent	Donald Trump
