= List of United States federal courthouses in Indiana =

Following is a list of current and former courthouses of the United States federal court system located in Indiana. Each entry indicates the name of the building along with an image, if available, its location and the jurisdiction it covers, the dates during which it was used for each such jurisdiction, and, if applicable the person for whom it was named, and the date of renaming. Dates of use will not necessarily correspond with the dates of construction or demolition of a building, as pre-existing structures may be adapted or court use, and former court buildings may later be put to other uses. Also, the official name of the building may be changed at some point after its use as a federal court building has been initiated.

== Courthouses ==
Courthouse	City	Image	Street address	Jurisdiction	Dates of use	Named for
U.S. Custom House and Post Office†	Evansville		100 Northwest 2nd Street	D. Ind. S.D. Ind.	1879–1928; 1928–1969; Now privately owned.	n/a
Winfield K. Denton Federal Building & U.S. Courthouse	Evansville		101 Northwest Martin Luther King Boulevard	S.D. Ind.	?–present	U.S. Representative Winfield K. Denton
U.S. Court House & Post Office	Fort Wayne		Southeast corner Berry & Clinton Sts.	D. Ind. N.D. Ind.	1889–1928; 1928–1932; Razed in the 1930s.	n/a
E. Ross Adair Federal Building & U.S. Courthouse^{†}	Fort Wayne		1300 South Harrison Street	N.D. Ind.	1932–present	E. Ross Adair
U.S. Post Office & Court House	Hammond		507 East State Street	D. Ind. N.D. Ind.	1907–1928; 1928–2002; Still standing but not presently in use.	n/a
U.S. Courthouse	Hammond		5400 Federal Plaza	N.D. Ind.	2002–present	n/a
U.S. Court House and Post Office	Indianapolis		Market & Pennsylvania Streets	D. Ind.	1861–1905; Razed in 1963.	n/a
Birch Bayh Federal Building & U.S. Courthouse^{†}	Indianapolis		46 East Ohio Street	S.D. Ind.	1905–present	U.S. Sen. Birch Bayh (2003)
Charles A. Halleck Federal Building	Lafayette		230 North Fourth Street	N.D. Ind.	1931–present	Charles A. Halleck
U.S. Court House & Post Office	New Albany		?	D. Ind. S.D. Ind.	1879–1928; 1928-1966; Building razed.	n/a
Lee H. Hamilton Federal Building & U.S. Courthouse	New Albany		121 West Spring Street	S.D. Ind.	1966–present	Congressman Lee H. Hamilton (2001)
Robert A. Grant Federal Building and U.S. Courthouse†	South Bend		204 South Main Street	N.D. Ind.	1933–present	District Court judge Robert A. Grant (1992)
Terre Haute Post Office and Federal Building†	Terre Haute		30 North 7th Street	S.D. Ind.	1935–2009	n/a
U.S. Courthouse	Terre Haute		921 Ohio Street	S.D. Ind.	2009–present	n/a

== Key ==
^{†}	Listed on the National Register of Historic Places (NRHP)
^{††}	NRHP-listed and also designated as a National Historic Landmark
