= Cristal C. Brisco =

American judge (born 1981)

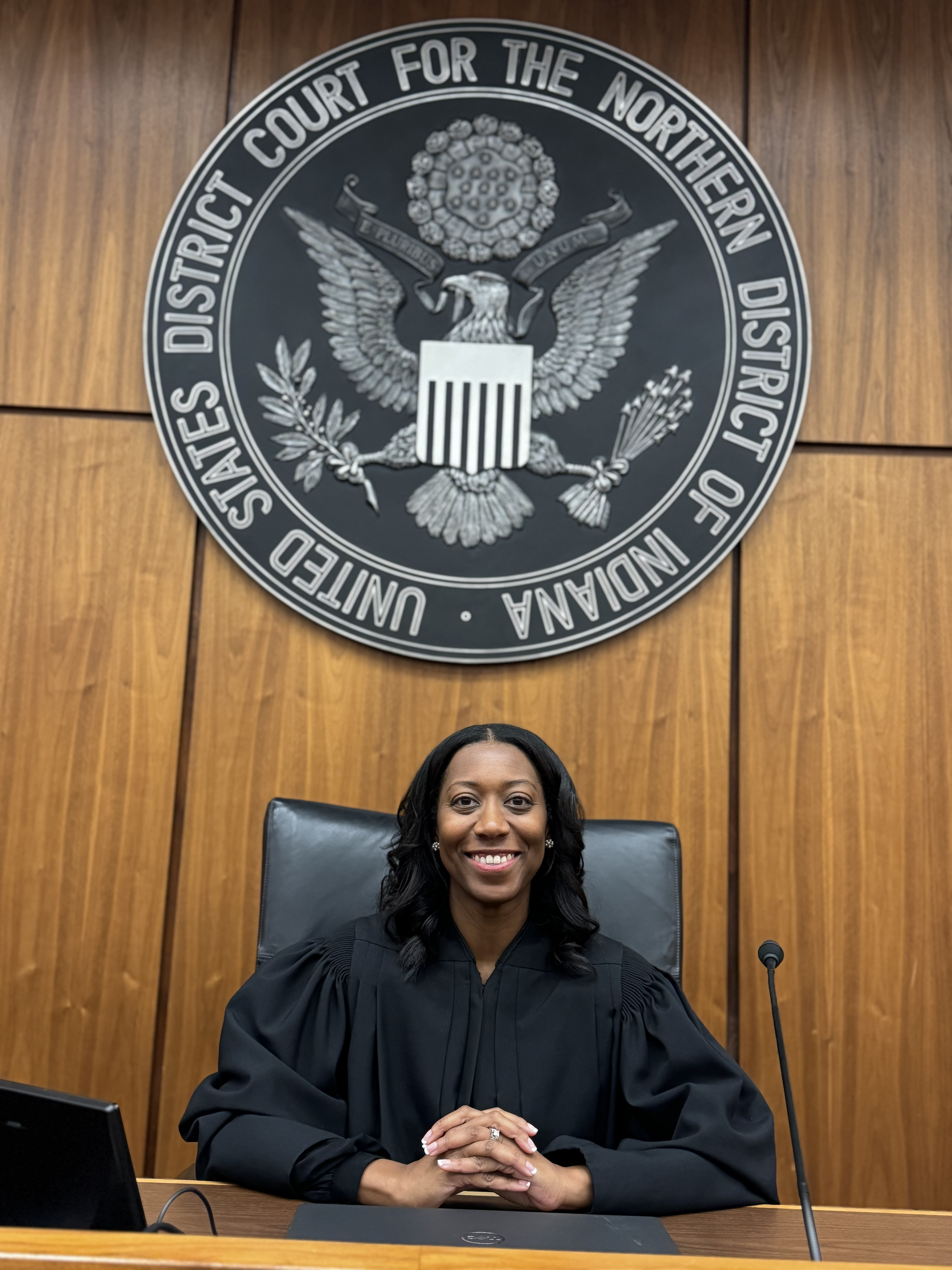
- Hon. Cristal C. Brisco

Judge of the United States District Court for the Northern District of Indiana
- Incumbent
- Assumed office January 26, 2024
- Appointed by: Joe Biden
- Preceded by: Theresa Lazar Springmann

Judge of the St. Joseph County Superior Court
- In office June 3, 2021 – January 26, 2024
- Appointed by: Eric Holcomb
- Succeeded by: Christopher Fronk

Personal details
- Born: Cristal Michelle Clark; 1981 (age 44–45) Merrillville, Indiana, U.S.
- Education: Valparaiso University (BA) University of Notre Dame (JD)

Cristal C. Brisco (née Clark; born 1981) is an American lawyer who has served as a United States district judge of the United States District Court for the Northern District of Indiana since 2024. She previously served as a judge of the St. Joseph County Superior Court from 2021 to 2024.

== Education ==
Brisco received a Bachelor of Arts, cum laude, from Valparaiso University in 2002 and a Juris Doctor from the Notre Dame Law School in 2006.

== Career ==
Brisco began her career as an associate at Barnes & Thornburg where she worked from 2006 to 2013. From 2013 to 2017, she served as corporation counsel for the City of South Bend during Mayor Pete Buttigieg's Administration. From 2017 to 2018, she was general counsel to Saint Mary's College, Notre Dame. From 2018 to 2021, she served as a magistrate judge on the St. Joseph County Circuit Court in Mishawaka, Indiana. On June 3, 2021, she was appointed by Governor Eric Holcomb to serve as a judge of the St. Joseph County Superior Court in South Bend, Indiana and concurrently served as a judge on the Indiana Commercial Court from 2022 to 2024.

=== Federal judicial service ===
On November 15, 2023, President Joe Biden announced his intent to nominate Brisco to serve as a United States district judge of the United States District Court for the Northern District of Indiana. On November 27, 2023, her nomination was sent to the Senate. President Biden nominated Brisco to the seat vacated by Judge Theresa Lazar Springmann, who assumed senior status on January 23, 2021. On December 13, 2023, a hearing on her nomination was held before the Senate Judiciary Committee. On January 3, 2024, her nomination was returned to the president under Rule XXXI, Paragraph 6 of the United States Senate and she was renominated on January 8, 2024. On January 18, 2024, her nomination was reported out of committee by a 14–7 vote. On January 24, 2024, the Senate invoked cloture on her nomination by a 68–29 vote. Later that day, her nomination was confirmed by a 67–32 vote. She received her judicial commission on January 26, 2024. She became the first Black woman to sit as a judge on the federal court serving northern Indiana.

== See also ==
- List of African American federal judges
- List of African American jurists

Legal offices
| Preceded by Theresa Lazar Springmann | Judge of the United States District Court for the Northern District of Indiana; 2024–present | Incumbent |
