= United States District Court for the Northern District of Indiana =

United States federal district court in Indiana

Coordinates: 41°04′25.5″N 85°08′26.3″W

- (N.D. Ind.)
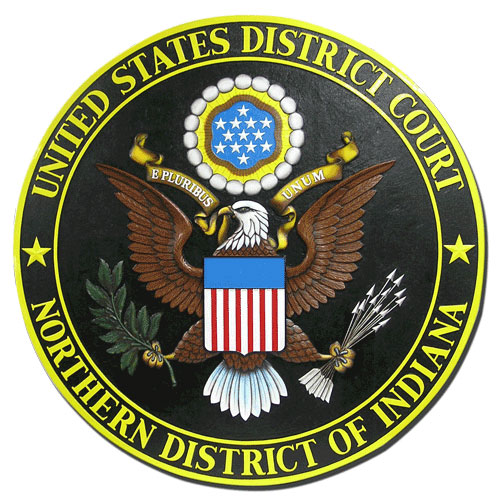

- Map of the district's jurisdiction by county, showing the four divisions. Fort Wayne Division (east) Hammond Division (north-west) Lafayette Division (south-west) South Bend Division (center)
- Location: Robert A. Grant Federal Building and U.S. Courthouse (South Bend) More locations: E. Ross Adair Federal Building and U.S. Courthouse (Fort Wayne); Hammond; Lafayette
- Appeals to: Seventh Circuit
- Established: April 21, 1928
- Judges: 5
- Chief Judge: Holly A. Brady

Officers of the court
- U.S. Attorney: Adam Mildred
- U.S. Marshal: Todd L. Nukes
- www.innd.uscourts.gov

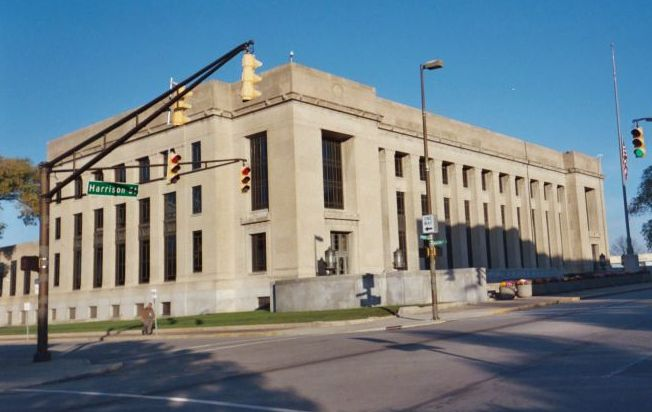
The E. Ross Adair Federal Building, seat of the Fort Wayne division of the U.S. District Court for the Northern District of Indiana

The U.S. District Court for the Northern District of Indiana (in case citations, N.D. Ind.) was created in 1928 by an act of Congress that split Indiana into two separate districts, northern and southern. As part of the act, the Northern District was divided into three divisions, South Bend, Fort Wayne, and Hammond (which has a sub-office in Lafayette). Appeals from this court are taken to the United States Court of Appeals for the Seventh Circuit (except for patent claims and claims against the U.S. government under the Tucker Act, which are appealed to the Federal Circuit). The court has eight judges and four magistrate judges. As of December 2025, the United States attorney is Adam Mildred.

== History ==
The United States District Court for the District of Indiana was established on March 3, 1817, by 3 Stat. 390. The District was subdivided into Northern and Southern Districts on April 21, 1928, by 45 Stat. 437. Of all district courts to be subdivided, Indiana existed for the longest time as a single court, 111 years.

== Divisions of the Northern District ==
- Fort Wayne: Adams County, Allen County, Blackford County, DeKalb County, Grant County, Huntington County, Jay County, LaGrange County, Noble County, Steuben County, Wells County, and Whitley County.
- Hammond: Lake County and Porter County.
- Lafayette: Benton County, Carroll County, Jasper County, Newton County, Tippecanoe County, Warren County and White County.
- South Bend: Cass County, Elkhart County, Fulton County, Kosciusko County, LaPorte County, Marshall County, Miami County, Pulaski County, St. Joseph County, Starke County and Wabash County.

== Current judges ==
As of July 7, 2025:

#	Title	Judge	Duty station	Born	Term of service			Appointed by
#	Title	Judge	Duty station	Born	Active	Chief	Senior	Appointed by
18	Chief Judge	Holly A. Brady	Fort Wayne	1969	2019–present	2023–present	—	Trump
14	District Judge	Philip P. Simon	Hammond	1962	2003–present	2010–2017	—	G.W. Bush
19	District Judge	Damon R. Leichty	South Bend	1971	2019–present	—	—	Trump
20	District Judge	Cristal C. Brisco	South Bend	1981	2024–present	—	—	Biden
21	District Judge	Gretchen S. Lund	Hammond	1975	2024–present	—	—	Biden
11	Senior Judge	James Tyne Moody	Hammond	1938	1982–2003	—	2003–present	Reagan
12	Senior Judge	Robert Lowell Miller Jr.	inactive	1950	1985–2016	2003–2010	2016–present	Reagan
15	Senior Judge	Theresa Lazar Springmann	Hammond	1956	2003–2021	2017–2020	2021–present	G.W. Bush
16	Senior Judge	Joseph S. Van Bokkelen	inactive	1943	2007–2017	—	2017–present	G.W. Bush
17	Senior Judge	Jon DeGuilio	Hammond	1955	2010–2023	2020–2023	2023–present	Obama

== Vacancies and pending nominations ==
Seat	Prior judge's duty station	Seat last held by	Vacancy reason	Date of vacancy	Nominee	Date of nomination
4	Hammond	Philip P. Simon	Retirement	July 8, 2027	Joseph P. Falvey	November 9, 2026

== Former judges ==
#	Judge	Born–died	Active service	Chief Judge	Senior status	Appointed by	Reason for termination
1	Thomas Whitten Slick	1869–1959	1928–1943 (Note: Reassigned from the District of Indiana.)	—	—	Coolidge/Operation of law	retirement
2	Luther Merritt Swygert	1905–1988	1943–1961	1954–1961	—	F. Roosevelt	elevation
3	William Lynn Parkinson	1902–1959	1954–1957	—	—	Eisenhower	elevation
4	Robert A. Grant	1905–1998	1957–1972	1961–1972	1972–1998	Eisenhower	death
5	George N. Beamer	1904–1974	1962–1974	1972–1974	—	Kennedy	death
6	Jesse E. Eschbach	1920–2005	1962–1981	1974–1981	—	Kennedy	elevation
7	Allen Sharp	1932–2009	1973–2007	1981–1996	2007–2009	Nixon	death
8	Phil McNagny Jr.	1924–1981	1976–1981	—	—	Ford	death
9	William Charles Lee	1938–2024	1981–2003	1997–2003	2003–2024	Reagan	death
10	Michael Stephen Kanne	1938–2022	1982–1987	—	—	Reagan	elevation
13	Rodolfo Lozano	1942–2018	1988–2007	—	2007–2018	Reagan	death

== Chief judges ==
Chief judges have administrative responsibilities with respect to their district court. Unlike the Supreme Court, where one justice is specifically nominated to be chief, the office of chief judge rotates among the district court judges. To be chief, a judge must have been in active service on the court for at least one year, be under the age of 65, and have not previously served as chief judge.

A vacancy is filled by the judge highest in seniority among the group of qualified judges. The chief judge serves for a term of seven years, or until age 70, whichever occurs first. The age restrictions are waived if no members of the court would otherwise be qualified for the position.

When the office was created in 1948, the chief judge was the longest-serving judge who had not elected to retire, on what has since 1958 been known as senior status, or declined to serve as chief judge. After August 6, 1959, judges could not become or remain chief after turning 70 years old. The current rules have been in operation since October 1, 1982.

== Succession of seats ==
Seat 1
Seat reassigned from District of Indiana on April 21, 1928 by 45 Stat. 437
Slick	1928–1943
Swygert	1943–1961
Eschbach	1962–1981
Moody	1982–2003
Springmann	2003–2021
Brisco	2024–present

Seat 2
Seat established on February 10, 1954 by 68 Stat. 8
Parkinson	1954–1957
Grant	1957–1972
Sharp	1973–2007
DeGuilio	2010–2023
Lund	2024–present

Seat 3
Seat established on May 19, 1961 by 75 Stat. 80
Beamer	1962–1974
McNagny, Jr.	1976–1981
Kanne	1982–1987
Lozano	1988–2007
Van Bokkelen	2007–2017
Brady	2019–present

Seat 4
Seat established on October 20, 1978 by 92 Stat. 1629
Lee	1981–2003
Simon	2003–present

Seat 5
Seat established on July 10, 1984 by 98 Stat. 333 (temporary)
Seat made permanent on December 1, 1990 by 104 Stat. 5089
Miller, Jr.	1985–2016
Leichty	2019–present

== List of U.S. attorneys since 1928 ==
- Oliver Mullins Loomis 1928–1933
- James R. Fleming 1933–1941
- Alexander M. Campbell 1941–1949
- Gilmore Haynie 1949–1953
- Joseph H. Lesh 1953–1954
- Phil M. McNagny Jr. 1954–1958
- Kenneth C. Raub 1959–1962
- Philip C. Potts 1962
- Alfred Moellering 1962–1970
- William C. Lee 1970–1973
- John R. Wilks 1973–1977
- David T. Ready 1977–1981
- R. Lawrence Steel Jr. 1981–1985
- James G. Richmond 1985–1991
- John F. Hoehner 1991–1993
- Jon DeGuilio 1993–1999
- Joseph S. Van Bokkelen 2001–2007
- David A. Capp 2007–2017
- Thomas Kirsch 2017–2020
- Clifford D. Johnson 2021–2025
- Tina L. Nommay (acting) 2025
- Adam Mildred 2025–Present

== See also ==
- Courts of Indiana
- List of current United States district judges
- List of United States federal courthouses in Indiana
