= Clifford D. Johnson =

American lawyer (born 1954)

Clifford Johnson
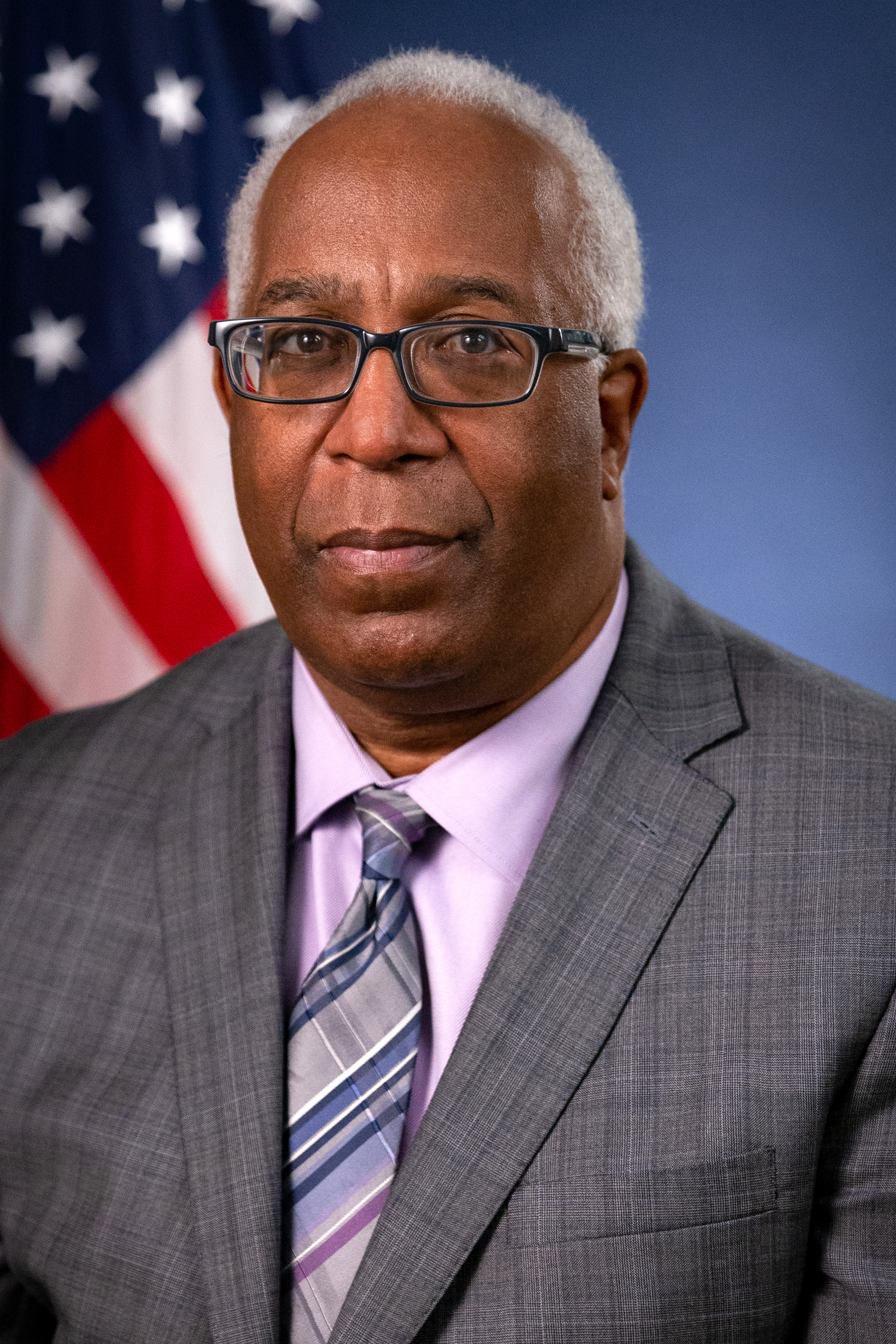

United States Attorney for the Northern District of Indiana
- In office October 6, 2021 – January 18, 2025
- President: Joe Biden
- Preceded by: Thomas Kirsch
- Succeeded by: Tina L. Nommay (acting)
- In office Acting: March 10, 2017 – October 10, 2017
- President: Donald Trump
- Preceded by: David A. Capp
- Succeeded by: Thomas Kirsch

Personal details
- Born: 1954 (age 71–72) Gary, Indiana, U.S.
- Education: Valparaiso University (BA, JD)

Clifford Darnell Johnson (born 1954) is an American lawyer who served as the United States attorney for the Northern District of Indiana from 2021 to 2025.

== Early life and education ==
Johnson was born in Gary, Indiana. He earned a Bachelor of Arts degree from Valparaiso University in 1976 and a Juris Doctor from the Valparaiso University School of Law in 1980.

== Career ==
From 1980 to 1985, Johnson served as a trial attorney in the United States Department of Justice Civil Rights Division. He then joined the Northern District of Indiana as an Assistant United States Attorney in 1986. He served as the chief of the Civil Division from 1997 to 2010, first assistant United States attorney from 2010 to 2020, and acting United States attorney for several months in 2017, succeeding David A. Capp. He retired from the office in August 2020.

=== United States attorney for Northern District of Indiana ===
On July 26, 2021, President Joe Biden nominated Johnson to be the United States attorney for the Northern District of Indiana. On September 23, 2021, his nomination was reported out of committee. On September 30, 2021, his nomination was confirmed in the United States Senate by voice vote. President Biden signed his commission on October 5, 2021, and he was formally sworn into office by the chief judge of the district, Jon DeGuilio, on October 6, 2021.

On January 18, 2025, Johnson resigned.
