= Gretchen S. Lund =

American judge (born 1975)

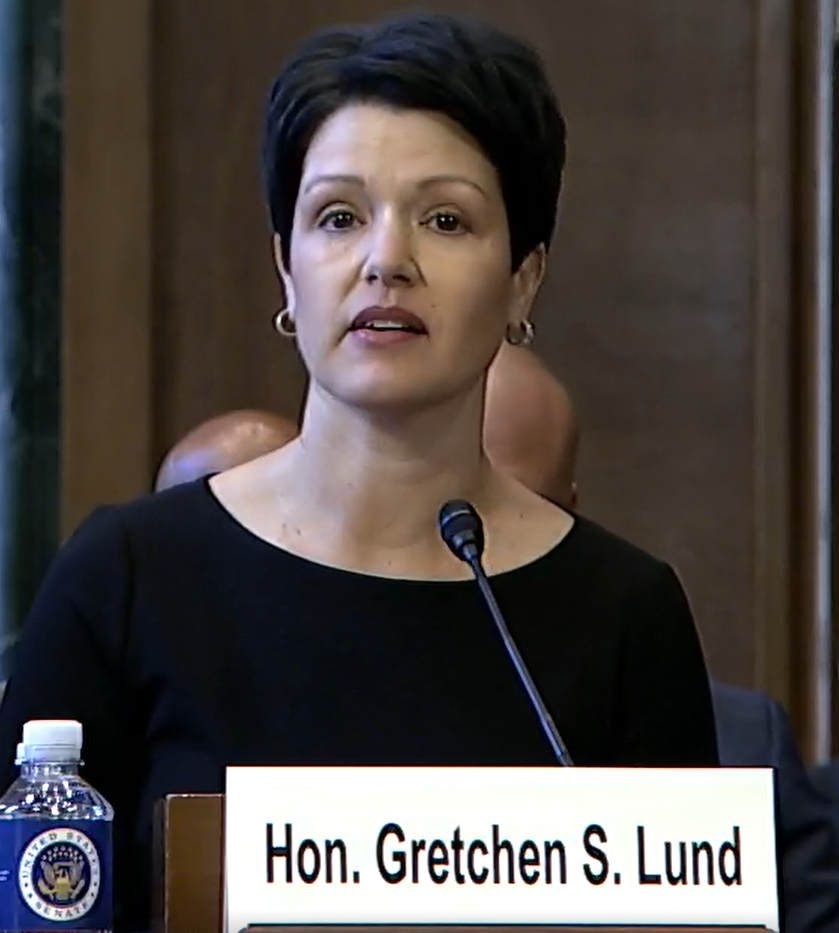

Judge of the United States District Court for the Northern District of Indiana
- Incumbent
- Assumed office January 29, 2024
- Appointed by: Joe Biden
- Preceded by: Jon DeGuilio

Judge of the Elkhart County Superior Court
- In office 2015 – January 29, 2024
- Succeeded by: Elizabeth A. Bellin

Personal details
- Born: Gretchen Suzanne Hess; 1975 (age 50–51) Elkhart, Indiana, U.S.
- Party: Republican
- Education: Butler University (BA); Valparaiso University (JD)

Gretchen Suzanne Lund (née Hess; born 1975) is an American lawyer who has served as a United States district judge of the United States District Court for the Northern District of Indiana since 2024. She previously served as a judge of the Elkhart County Superior Court from 2015 to 2024.

== Education ==
Lund received a Bachelor of Arts from Butler University, cum laude, in 1998 and a Juris Doctor, summa cum laude, from Valparaiso University School of Law in 2001.

== Career ==
From 2001 to 2002, Lund was an associate at Ice Miller LLP in Indianapolis, Indiana. From 2002 to 2006, she served as a law clerk for then U.S. Magistrate Judge William T. Lawrence of the United States District Court for the Southern District of Indiana. From 2006 to 2007, she served as a deputy prosecutor in the Elkhart County Prosecuting Attorney's Office. From 2008 to 2014, she served as a judge on the Goshen City Court. From 2015 to 2024, she served as a judge of the Elkhart County Superior Court. She was elected as a Republican in 2014 and won a second six-year term in 2020.

In 2022, Indiana Governor Eric Holcomb considered appointing Lund to the Indiana Supreme Court.

=== Federal judicial service ===
On November 15, 2023, President Joe Biden announced his intent to nominate Lund to serve as a United States district judge of the United States District Court for the Northern District of Indiana. On November 27, 2023, her nomination was sent to the Senate. President Biden nominated Lund to the seat vacated by Judge Jon DeGuilio, who assumed senior status on July 17, 2023. On December 13, 2023, a hearing on her nomination was held before the Senate Judiciary Committee. On January 3, 2024, her nomination was returned to the president under Rule XXXI, Paragraph 6 of the United States Senate and she was renominated on January 8, 2024. On January 18, 2024, her nomination was reported out of committee by a 20–1 vote. On January 25, 2024, the Senate confirmed her nomination by an 87–6 vote. She received her judicial commission on January 29, 2024.

Legal offices
Preceded by Jon DeGuilio	Judge of the United States District Court for the Northern District of Indiana; 2024–present	Incumbent
