= Holly A. Brady =

American judge (born 1969)

Holly Brady
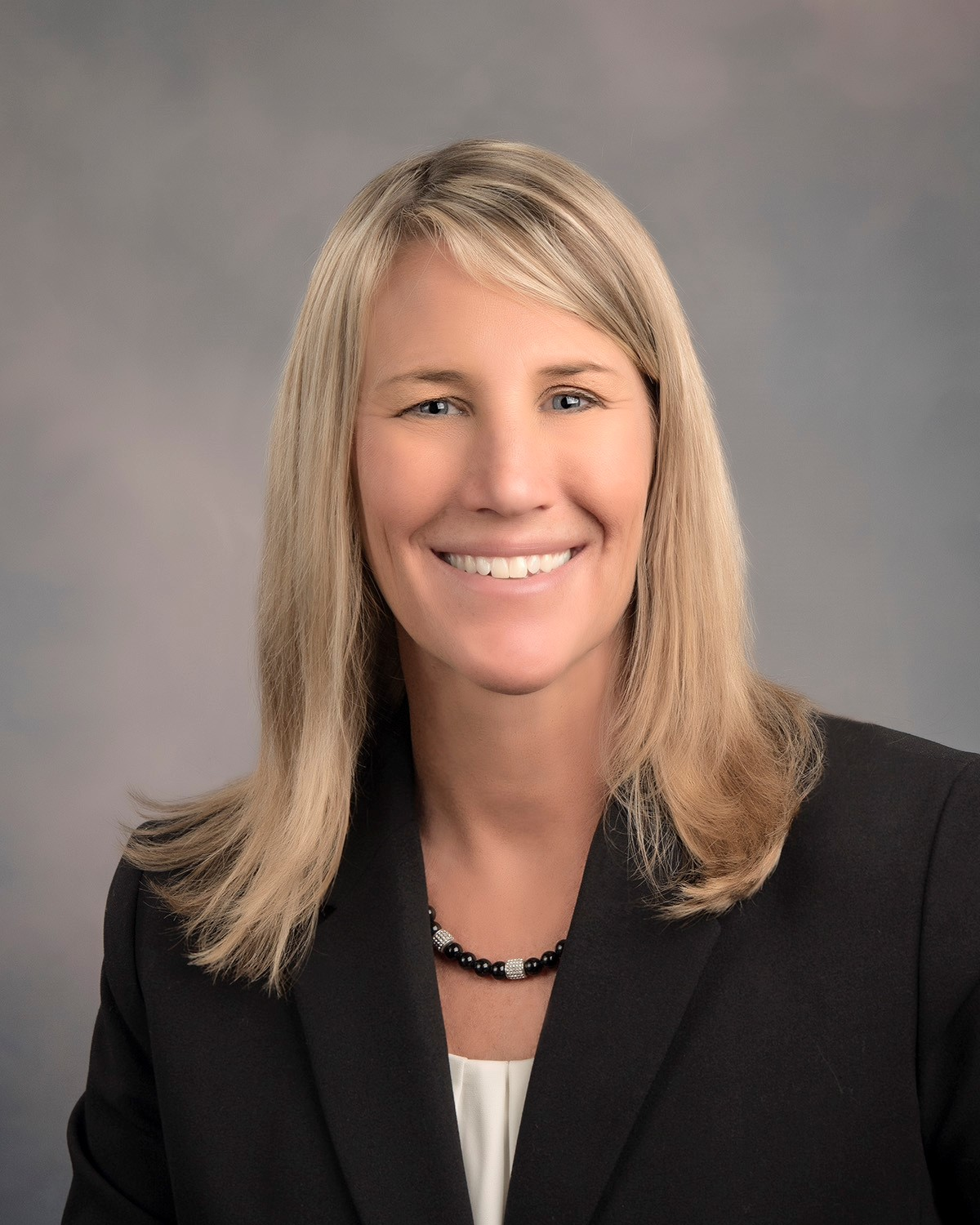

Chief Judge of the United States District Court for the Northern District of Indiana
- Incumbent
- Assumed office July 17, 2023
- Preceded by: Jon DeGuilio

Judge of the United States District Court for the Northern District of Indiana
- Incumbent
- Assumed office April 16, 2019
- Appointed by: Donald Trump
- Preceded by: Joseph S. Van Bokkelen

Personal details
- Born: Holly Ann Winkeljohn; August 14, 1969 (age 57) Fort Wayne, Indiana, U.S.
- Education: Indiana University, Bloomington (BA); Valparaiso University (JD)

Holly Ann Winkeljohn Brady (née Winkeljohn; born August 14, 1969) is the chief United States district judge of the United States District Court for the Northern District of Indiana.

== Biography ==
Brady earned her Bachelor of Arts from Indiana University at Bloomington and her Juris Doctor from the Valparaiso University School of Law.

== Career ==
After graduating from law school, Brady worked as an associate in the labor law firm of Gallucci, Hopkins & Theisen from 1994 to 1998. The firm merged with Barnes & Thornburg in 1998, and she continued on with that firm's labor and employment litigation section until 2002. From 2002 to 2007, she was a member at Theisen, Bowers, & Brady in Fort Wayne.

From 2007 to 2019, when she became a district judge, Brady was a member in the Fort Wayne law firm of Haller & Colvin, where she focused her practice on civil, employment, and labor litigation. She was president of the firm from 2012 to 2018.

=== Federal judicial service ===
On April 10, 2018, President Donald Trump nominated Brady to serve as a United States District Judge of the United States District Court for the Northern District of Indiana. She was nominated to the seat vacated by Judge Joseph S. Van Bokkelen, who assumed senior status on September 29, 2017. On June 6, 2018, a hearing on her nomination was held before the Senate Judiciary Committee. On June 28, 2018, her nomination was reported out of committee by an 11–10 vote.

On January 3, 2019, her nomination was returned to the President under Rule XXXI, Paragraph 6 of the United States Senate. On January 23, 2019, President Trump announced his intent to renominate Brady for a federal judgeship. Her nomination was sent to the Senate later that day. On February 7, 2019, her nomination was reported out of committee by a 12–10 vote. On April 10, 2019, the Senate invoked cloture on her nomination and later that day, she was confirmed by a 56–42 vote. She received her judicial commission on April 16, 2019. She became chief judge on July 17, 2023.

== Recognition ==
Each year since 2013, Brady has been recognized in The Best Lawyers in America for labor and employment law. She is involved in numerous community organizations and has served on the Northern District of Indiana Federal Community Defenders Board of Directors and as Vice President of the Fort Wayne Sexual Assault Treatment Center.

Legal offices
Preceded by Joseph S. Van Bokkelen	Judge of the United States District Court for the Northern District of Indiana; 2019–present	Incumbent
Preceded by Jon DeGuilio	Chief Judge of the United States District Court for the Northern District of Indiana; 2023–present	Incumbent
