= Van Bokkelen =

Van Bokkelen is a Dutch surname. Notable people with the surname include:

- Libertus Van Bokkelen (1815–1889), First Superintendent of Maryland public schools
- Joseph S. Van Bokkelen (born 1943), American judge
