= Damon R. Leichty =

American judge (born 1971)

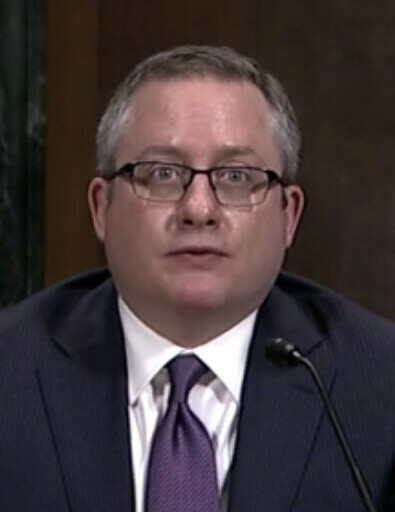

Judge of the United States District Court for the Northern District of Indiana
- Incumbent
- Assumed office July 26, 2019
- Appointed by: Donald Trump
- Preceded by: Robert Lowell Miller Jr.

Personal details
- Born: Damon Ray Leichty; 1971 (age 53–54) Rensselaer, Indiana, U.S.
- Education: Wabash College (AB); University of Aberdeen (MLitt); Indiana University, Bloomington (JD)

Damon Ray Leichty (born 1971) is a United States district judge of the United States District Court for the Northern District of Indiana.

== Education and career ==
Leichty earned his Bachelor of Arts, summa cum laude, from Wabash College, a Master of Letters from the University of Aberdeen, and his Juris Doctor, cum laude, from the Indiana University Maurer School of Law.

After graduation from law school, Leichty served as a law clerk to Judge Robert Lowell Miller Jr. of the United States District Court for the Northern District of Indiana. He went on to join the South Bend office of the law firm of Barnes & Thornburg, where he became a partner. His practice focused on complex civil litigation, including federal product liability cases.

Leichty has been an adjunct professor at Notre Dame Law School since 2017, where he teaches product liability law.

== Federal judicial service ==
On July 13, 2018, President Donald Trump announced his intent to nominate Leichty to a seat on the United States District Court for the Northern District of Indiana. On July 17, 2018, his nomination was sent to the Senate. President Donald Trump nominated Leichty to the seat vacated by Judge Robert Lowell Miller Jr., who assumed senior status on January 11, 2016. In early 2017, Leichty interviewed with Republican Senator Todd Young in April but was not selected by the White House until April 2018 when he interviewed with Democratic Senator Joe Donnelly. On November 13, 2018, a hearing on his nomination was held before the Senate Judiciary Committee.

On January 3, 2019, his nomination was returned to the President under Rule XXXI, Paragraph 6 of the United States Senate. On January 23, 2019, President Trump announced his intent to renominate Leichty for a federal judgeship. His nomination was sent to the Senate later that day. On February 7, 2019, his nomination was reported out of committee by a voice vote. On July 9, 2019, the Senate invoked cloture on his nomination by an 87–11 vote. On July 10, 2019, his nomination was confirmed by an 85–10 vote. He received his judicial commission on July 26, 2019.

Legal offices
Preceded by Robert Lowell Miller Jr.	Judge of the United States District Court for the Northern District of Indiana; 2019–present	Incumbent
