= Joshua P. Kolar =

American judge (born 1976)

Joshua Kolar
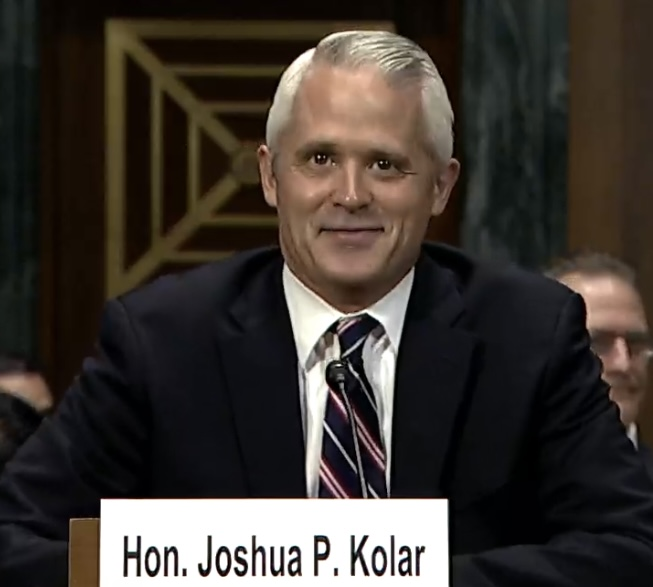

Judge of the United States Court of Appeals for the Seventh Circuit
- Incumbent
- Assumed office January 31, 2024
- Appointed by: Joe Biden
- Preceded by: Michael Stephen Kanne

Personal details
- Born: Joshua Paul Kolar; 1976 (age 49–50) Chicago, Illinois, U.S.
- Education: Northwestern University (BA, JD)

Military service
- Allegiance: United States
- Branch/service: United States Navy
- Years of service: 2009–present
- Rank: Lieutenant Commander
- Unit: United States Indo-Pacific Command; United States Navy Reserve
- Battles/wars: Operation Enduring Freedom; Operation Freedom's Sentinel
- Awards: See list: Defense Meritorious Service Medal Joint Service Commendation Medal Joint Meritorious Unit Award National Defense Service Medal Afghanistan Campaign Medal (with two campaign stars) Global War on Terrorism Service Medal Navy and Marine Corps Overseas Service Ribbon Armed Forces Reserve Medal Non-Article 5 NATO ISAF Medal Navy Rifle Marksmanship Ribbon Navy Pistol Marksmanship Ribbon

Joshua Paul Kolar (born 1976) is an American lawyer from Indiana who has served as a United States circuit judge of the United States Court of Appeals for the Seventh Circuit since 2024. He previously served as a United States magistrate judge of the United States District Court for the Northern District of Indiana from 2019 to 2024.

== Education ==
Kolar received a Bachelor of Arts from Northwestern University in 1999 and a Juris Doctor from Northwestern University Pritzker School of Law in 2003.

== Career ==
From 2005 to 2006, Kolar served as a law clerk for Judge Wayne Andersen of the United States District Court for the Northern District of Illinois. From 2003 to 2005 and 2006 to 2007, he was an associate at Mayer Brown in their Chicago office. From 2007 to 2018, he served as an assistant United States attorney in the United States Attorney's Office for the Northern District of Indiana. Kolar also serves as a lieutenant commander in the United States Navy Reserve. He has served in the United States Navy Reserve since 2009 and was on active duty in Afghanistan from 2014 to 2015.

=== Federal judicial service ===
==== Magistrate judge ====
In 2018, Kolar was selected as a United States magistrate judge for the Northern District of Indiana in the Hammond division. He filled the vacancy left by the retirement of Judge Paul R. Cherry. He assumed office on January 1, 2019. He was later succeeded by Abizer Zanzi.

==== Court of appeals ====
On July 27, 2023, President Joe Biden nominated Kolar to serve as a United States circuit judge of the United States Court of Appeals for the Seventh Circuit. President Biden nominated Kolar to the seat vacated by Judge Michael Stephen Kanne, who died on June 16, 2022. Republican Senator Todd Young released a statement after the president nominated Kolar, stating that he supports Kolar. On September 6, 2023, a hearing on his nomination was held before the Senate Judiciary Committee. During his confirmation hearing, he was questioned by Senator Marsha Blackburn over a case that he presided over in 2019. On September 28, 2023, his nomination was reported out of committee by a 16–5 vote. On January 3, 2024, his nomination was returned to the President under Rule XXXI, Paragraph 6 of the United States Senate; and he was renominated on January 8, 2024. On January 18, 2024, his nomination was reported out of committee by a 16–5 vote. On January 25, 2024, the Senate invoked cloture on his nomination by a 66–29 vote. On January 30, 2024, his nomination was confirmed by a 66–25 vote. He received his judicial commission on January 31, 2024.

Legal offices
Preceded by Michael Stephen Kanne	Judge of the United States Court of Appeals for the Seventh Circuit; 2024–present	Incumbent
