= James Tyne Moody =

American judge (born 1938)

Senior Judge of the United States District Court for the Northern District of Indiana
- Incumbent
- Assumed office June 17, 2003

Judge of the United States District Court for the Northern District of Indiana
- In office February 9, 1982 – June 17, 2003
- Appointed by: Ronald Reagan
- Preceded by: Jesse E. Eschbach
- Succeeded by: Theresa Lazar Springmann

Magistrate Judge of the United States District Court for the Northern District of Indiana
- In office 1979–1982

Personal details
- Born: June 6, 1938 (age 87) LaCenter, Kentucky, U.S.
- Education: Indiana University Bloomington (AB, LLB)

James Tyne Moody (born June 6, 1938) is a senior United States district judge of the United States District Court for the Northern District of Indiana.

== Education and career ==
Born in LaCenter, Kentucky, Moody received an Artium Baccalaureus degree from Indiana University Bloomington in 1960 and a Bachelor of Laws from Indiana University Maurer School of Law in 1963. He was in private practice in Hobart, Indiana from 1964 to 1972. He was a city attorney of Hobart and Lake Station, Indiana from 1964 to 1973, and then of East Gary, Indiana from 1966 to 1970. He was a superior court judge for Lake County, Indiana from 1972 to 1979, when he became a United States magistrate judge of the United States District Court for the Northern District of Indiana, a position he held until 1982. He was also a member of the faculty of Business Law, Indiana University from 1977 to 1980.

=== Federal judicial service ===
On December 4, 1981, Moody was nominated by President Ronald Reagan to a seat on the United States District Court for the Northern District of Indiana vacated by Judge Jesse E. Eschbach. Moody was confirmed by the United States Senate on February 8, 1982, and received his commission the following day. He assumed senior status on June 17, 2003.

== Sources ==
Legal offices
Preceded by Jesse E. Eschbach	Judge of the United States District Court for the Northern District of Indiana; 1982–2003	Succeeded by Theresa Lazar Springmann
