= Luther Merritt Swygert =

American judge (1905–1988)

Senior Judge of the United States Court of Appeals for the Seventh Circuit
- In office July 1, 1981 – March 16, 1988

Chief Judge of the United States Court of Appeals for the Seventh Circuit
- In office 1970–1975
- Preceded by: Latham Castle
- Succeeded by: Thomas E. Fairchild

Judge of the United States Court of Appeals for the Seventh Circuit
- In office September 29, 1961 – July 1, 1981
- Appointed by: John F. Kennedy
- Preceded by: Seat established by 75 Stat. 80
- Succeeded by: Jesse E. Eschbach

Chief Judge of the United States District Court for the Northern District of Indiana
- In office 1954–1961
- Preceded by: Office established
- Succeeded by: Robert A. Grant

Judge of the United States District Court for the Northern District of Indiana
- In office October 16, 1943 – October 10, 1961
- Appointed by: Franklin D. Roosevelt
- Preceded by: Thomas Whitten Slick
- Succeeded by: Jesse E. Eschbach

Personal details
- Born: Luther Merritt Swygert; February 5, 1905 Miami County, Ohio
- Died: March 16, 1988 (aged 83)
- Education: Notre Dame Law School (LLB)

Luther Merritt Swygert (February 5, 1905 – March 16, 1988) was a United States circuit judge of the United States Court of Appeals for the Seventh Circuit and previously was a United States district judge of the United States District Court for the Northern District of Indiana.

== Education and career ==
Born in Miami County, Ohio, Swygert received a Bachelor of Laws from Notre Dame Law School in 1927. He was in private practice in Indiana from 1928 to 1931, and was then a deputy prosecuting attorney of Lake County, Indiana from 1931 to 1933. He was an Assistant United States Attorney of the Northern District of Indiana from 1934 to 1943.

== Federal judicial service ==
Swygert was nominated by President Franklin D. Roosevelt on September 29, 1943, to a seat on the United States District Court for the Northern District of Indiana vacated by Judge Thomas Whitten Slick. He was confirmed by the United States Senate on October 14, 1943, and received his commission on October 16, 1943. He served as Chief Judge from 1954 to 1961. His service terminated on October 10, 1961, due to elevation to the Seventh Circuit.

Swygert was nominated by President John F. Kennedy on September 18, 1961, to the United States Court of Appeals for the Seventh Circuit, to a new seat authorized by 75 Stat. 80. He was confirmed by the Senate on September 23, 1961, and received his commission on September 29, 1961. He served as Chief Judge from 1970 to 1975. He assumed senior status on July 1, 1981. His service terminated on March 16, 1988, due to his death.

== See also ==
- List of United States federal judges by longevity of service

== Sources ==
Legal offices
Preceded by Thomas Whitten Slick	Judge of the United States District Court for the Northern District of Indiana; 1943–1961	Succeeded by Jesse E. Eschbach
Preceded by Office established	Chief Judge of the United States District Court for the Northern District of Indiana; 1954–1961	Succeeded by Robert A. Grant
Preceded by Seat established by 75 Stat. 80	Judge of the United States Court of Appeals for the Seventh Circuit; 1961–1981	Succeeded by Jesse E. Eschbach
Preceded by Latham Castle	Chief Judge of the United States Court of Appeals for the Seventh Circuit; 1970–1975	Succeeded by Thomas E. Fairchild
