= Thomas Kirsch =

American judge (born 1974)

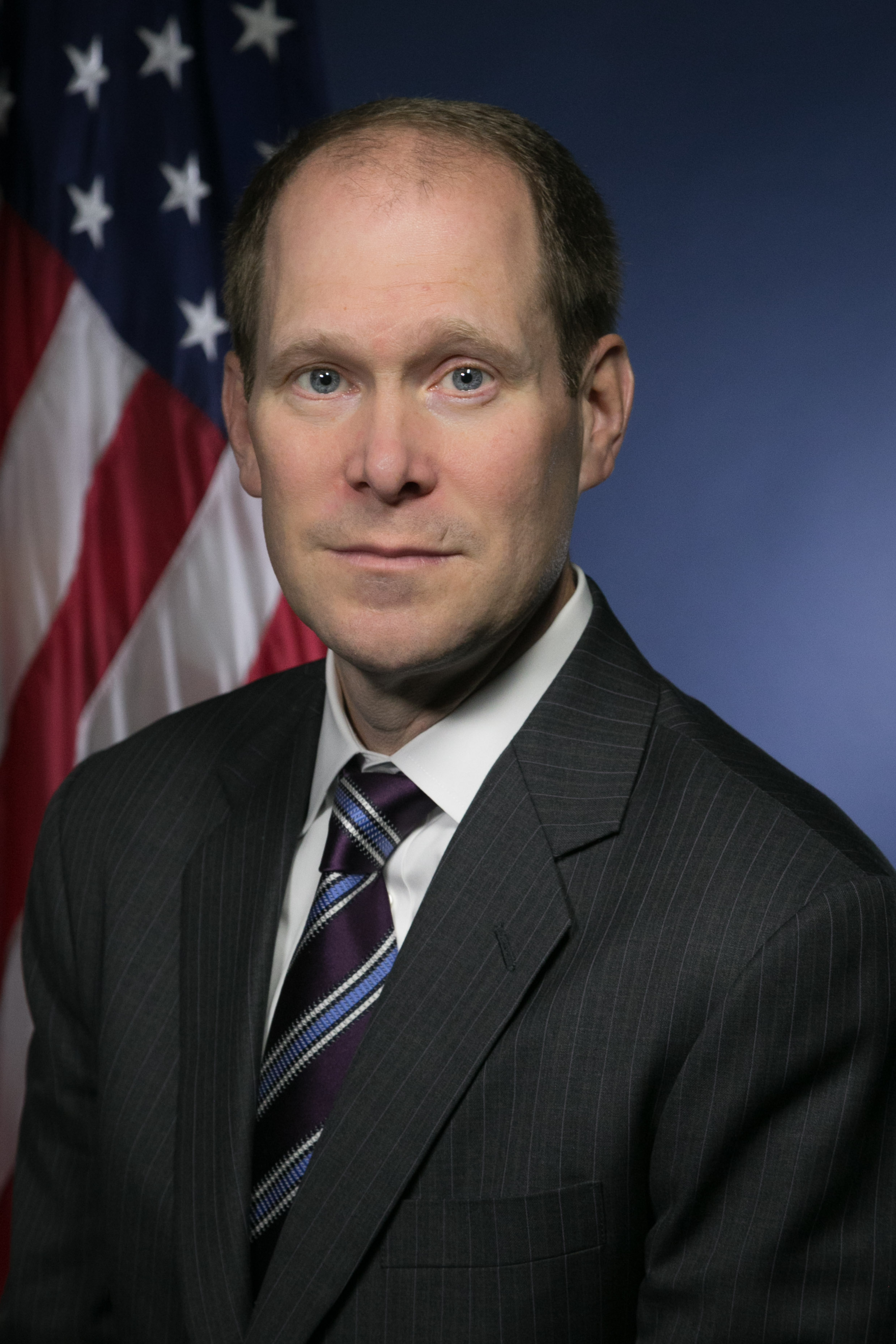

Judge of the United States Court of Appeals for the Seventh Circuit
- Incumbent
- Assumed office December 17, 2020
- Appointed by: Donald Trump
- Preceded by: Amy Coney Barrett

United States Attorney for the Northern District of Indiana
- In office October 10, 2017 – December 18, 2020
- President: Donald Trump
- Preceded by: David A. Capp
- Succeeded by: Clifford D. Johnson

Personal details
- Born: Thomas Lee Kirsch II; 1974 (age 51–52) Hammond, Indiana, U.S.
- Education: Indiana University, Bloomington (BA); Harvard University (JD)

Thomas Lee Kirsch II (born 1974) is an American attorney and jurist who has served as a United States circuit judge of the United States Court of Appeals for the Seventh Circuit since December 2020. He was previously the United States attorney for the Northern District of Indiana from October 2017 to December 2020.

== Early life and education ==
A native of Hammond, Indiana, Kirsch received a Bachelor of Arts degree in economics and political science, with highest distinction, from Indiana University in 1996, and a Juris Doctor from Harvard Law School in 1999.

== Career ==
After graduating from law school, Kirsch served as a law clerk to Judge John Daniel Tinder of the United States District Court for the Southern District of Indiana. He served as an Assistant United States Attorney for the Northern District of Indiana from 2001 to 2008 and was detailed to Washington, D.C. as Counsel to the United States Assistant Attorney General for the Office of Legal Policy from 2006 to 2007. Kirsch was a partner at Winston & Strawn from 2008 to 2017, where his practice focused on complex litigation and corporate investigations. While working for the government, he prosecuted offenses including mail and wire fraud, honest services fraud, tax fraud, bank fraud, health care fraud, conspiracy, extortion, money laundering, racketeering, obstruction of justice, perjury, and gangs and narcotics.

=== United States attorney ===
On July 14, 2017, Kirsch was announced as the nominee to be the United States attorney for the Northern District of Indiana. The nomination was sent to the United States Senate on August 2, 2017. He was confirmed by the Senate by voice vote on October 3, 2017. Kirsch was sworn in on October 10, 2017. Several days after being sworn into office, Kirsch announced the arrest of a man accused of sending a bomb that exploded in an East Chicago post office. His tenure as U.S. Attorney ended when he became a judge on December 18, 2020.

=== Federal judicial service ===
On October 21, 2020, President Donald Trump announced his intent to nominate Kirsch to serve as a United States circuit judge of the United States Court of Appeals for the Seventh Circuit. President Trump nominated Kirsch to the seat vacated by Judge Amy Coney Barrett, who was elevated to the Supreme Court of the United States. On November 16, 2020, his nomination was sent to the Senate. On November 18, 2020, a hearing on his nomination was held before the Senate Judiciary Committee. On December 10, 2020, his nomination was reported out of committee by a 12–10 vote. On December 14, 2020, the United States Senate invoked cloture on his nomination by a 51–42 vote. On December 15, 2020, his nomination was confirmed by the Senate by a 51–44 vote. He received his judicial commission on December 17, 2020, and was sworn into office on December 18, 2020.

Legal offices
Preceded by David A. Capp	United States Attorney for the Northern District of Indiana; 2017–2020	Succeeded by Clifford D. Johnson
Preceded by Amy Coney Barrett	Judge of the United States Court of Appeals for the Seventh Circuit; 2020–present	Incumbent
