= Michael Stephen Kanne =

American judge (1938–2022)

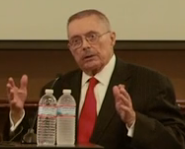

Judge of the United States Court of Appeals for the Seventh Circuit
- In office May 20, 1987 – June 16, 2022
- Appointed by: Ronald Reagan
- Preceded by: Jesse E. Eschbach
- Succeeded by: Joshua P. Kolar

Judge of the United States District Court for the Northern District of Indiana
- In office February 9, 1982 – May 21, 1987
- Appointed by: Ronald Reagan
- Preceded by: Phil McClellan McNagny Jr.
- Succeeded by: Rodolfo Lozano

Personal details
- Born: December 21, 1938 Rensselaer, Indiana, U.S.
- Died: June 16, 2022 (aged 83) Rensselaer, Indiana, U.S.
- Spouse: Judith Kanne
- Children: 2
- Education: Indiana University Bloomington (BS); Indiana University Maurer School of Law (JD)

Michael Stephen Kanne (December 21, 1938 – June 16, 2022) was a United States circuit judge of the United States Court of Appeals for the Seventh Circuit and a former United States District Judge of the United States District Court for the Northern District of Indiana.

== Education and career ==
Born in Rensselaer, Indiana, Kanne received a Bachelor of Science degree from Indiana University Bloomington in 1962. He served as a lieutenant in the United States Air Force from 1962 to 1965. He then received a Juris Doctor from Indiana University Maurer School of Law in 1968.

He was in private practice in Rensselaer, Indiana from 1968 to 1972, working as a city attorney for the City of Rensselaer in 1972. He was a judge on the 30th Judicial Circuit of Indiana from 1972 to 1982, and was a lecturer at St. Joseph's College from 1976 to 1989, and at St. Francis College in Fort Wayne, Indiana, from 1990 to 1991.

== Federal judicial service ==
On December 4, 1981, Kanne was nominated by President Ronald Reagan to a seat on the United States District Court for the Northern District of Indiana vacated by Judge Phil McClellan McNagny Jr. Kanne was confirmed by the United States Senate on February 8, 1982, and received his commission on February 9, 1982. During a prosecution of the New Chicago Chief of Police in Kanne's court, he quipped that New Chicago is the "most corrupt square mile in America." His service terminated on May 21, 1987, due to elevation to the court of appeals.

On February 2, 1987, Reagan nominated Kanne to a seat on the United States Court of Appeals for the Seventh Circuit vacated by Judge Jesse E. Eschbach. Kanne was confirmed by the United States Senate on May 19, 1987, and received his commission on May 20, 1987. On June 7, 2017, Representative Louie Gohmert (Texas Dist. 1) noted Kanne's conservative judicial philosophy, stating that: "There are only two reliable originalists on the court, Michael Kanne and Diane S. Sykes."

In February 2018, Kanne announced his intention to assume senior status upon the confirmation of a successor, provided that said successor would be one of his former law clerks, Indiana Solicitor General Tom Fisher. However, President Donald Trump ultimately declined to nominate Fisher following internal opposition from Vice President Mike Pence; as a result, Kanne rescinded his decision to assume senior status in May 2018, instead opting to remain as an active judge.

Kanne remained in active service until his death on June 16, 2022. His seat on the 7th Circuit Court of Appeals remained vacant until January 30, 2024, when Joshua P. Kolar was confirmed as his successor.

=== Notable cases ===
In December 2017, Kanne supported the 4–3 en banc decision to reverse an earlier federal magistrate judgement that a confession had been unlawfully coerced from 16-year-old Brendan Dassey. The dissenting opinion described this decision as 'a travesty of justice'.

On August 27, 2019, Kanne dissented in Box v. Planned Parenthood of Indiana and Kentucky, Inc. when David F. Hamilton and Ilana Rovner blocked a parental notification requirement for abortions in Indiana. The 7th circuit denied rehearing 6–5 on November 1, 2019, with Kanne dissenting again, joined by Joel Flaum, Amy Coney Barrett, Michael B. Brennan, and Michael Y. Scudder. Frank Easterbrook wrote a concurrence calling on the Supreme Court to take up the case, which it in fact did.

== See also ==
- List of United States federal judges by longevity of service

Legal offices
Preceded by Phil McClellan McNagny Jr.	Judge of the United States District Court for the Northern District of Indiana; 1982–1987	Succeeded by Rodolfo Lozano
Preceded by Jesse E. Eschbach	Judge of the United States Court of Appeals for the Seventh Circuit; 1987–2022	Succeeded by Joshua P. Kolar
