= Mooresville High School (Indiana) =

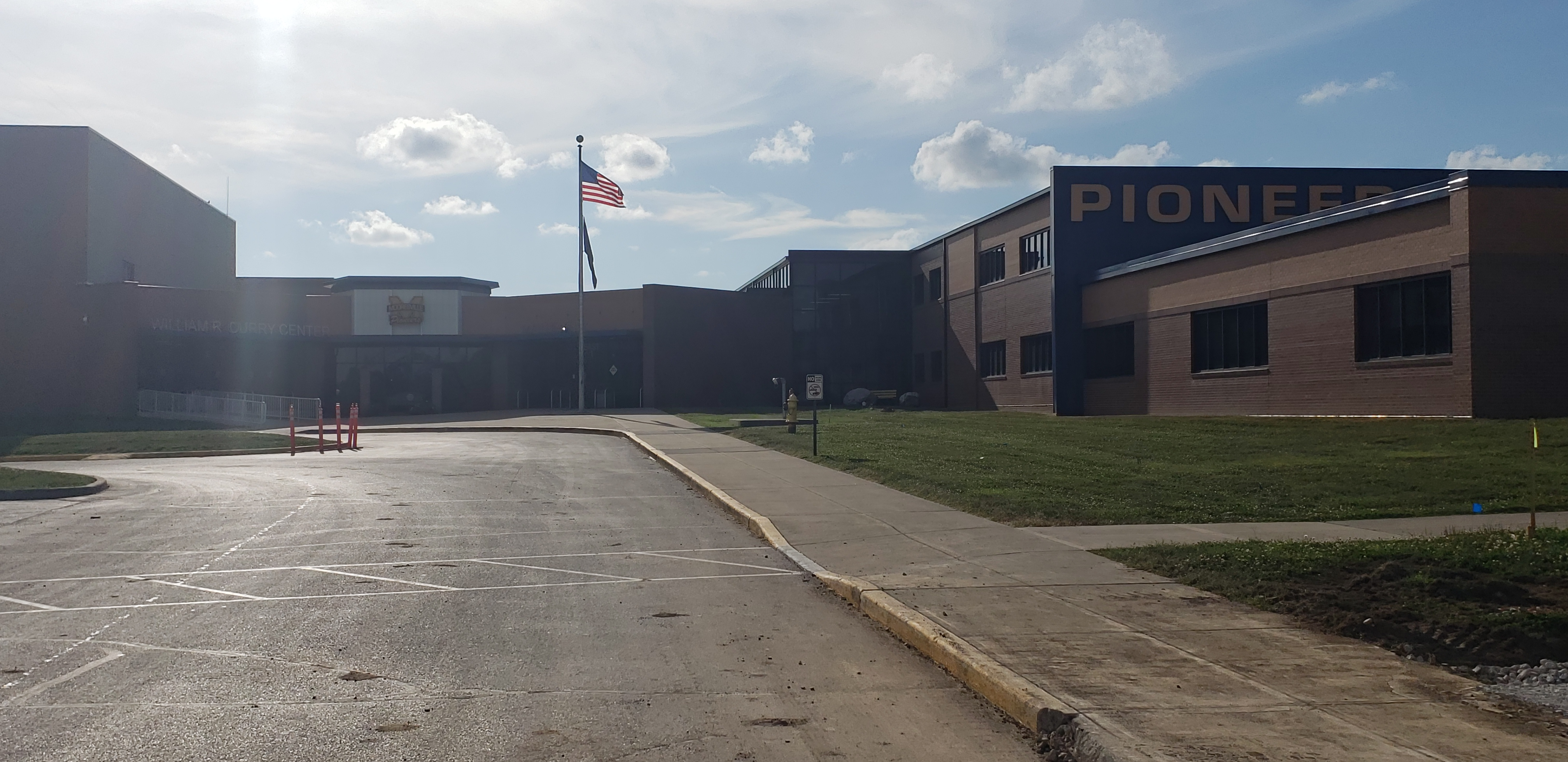
- The school, pictured in 2020

Location
- 550 N Indiana St; Mooresville, Morgan County, Indiana 46157; United States; 39.619404°N 86.376700°W

Information
- Type: Public high school
- School district: Mooresville Consolidated School Corporation
- Superintendent: Jake Allen
- Principal: Wes Upton
- Faculty: 169
- Grades: 9–12
- Enrollment: 1,380 (2023–2024)
- Color
- Athletics conference: Mid-State
- Team name: Pioneers
- Newspaper: The Pulse
- Website: Official Website

Mooresville High School is a public high school located in Mooresville, Indiana.

Mooresville was the first high school in central Indiana, built in 1861 as a subscription high school with students from as far away as Iowa boarding with local residents to attend school. The expense of operating the school was met by charging a tuition fee. In the first year, the school operated during a fall session at a cost of $11 and a spring session at a cost of $9. Beginning in the fall of 1862, the school held three sessions each year at a cost of $7.50 for each pupil enrolled for each session. Students who lived outside Mooresville boarded with local families at a cost of $1.50 to $2 per week.

The community of Mooresville is located southwest of Indianapolis, Indiana. The school district includes the Town of Mooresville as well as Brown Township, Madison Township, and Harrison Township.

As of the 2023–2024 school year, about 1,380 students attend Mooresville High School in grades 9–12.

== History ==
In 2005, Mooresville was the first high school to win the national State Farm Project Ignition Teen Safe Driving Program.

In 2006, the school's Junior State of America was honored as the JSA National Chapter of the Year by receiving the National Civic Impact award. The program was recognized as JSA National Chapter of the Year again in the early 2010s. The chapter continued to receive recognition at the state and national level until JSA's worldwide closure in 2024.

Mooresville's marching band, the Pioneer Regiment, consistently placed in the "Sweet 16" of the Indiana State Fair Band Day competition from 2010 to 2019.

=== 2025 shooting plot ===
On February 12, 2025, 18-year-old Trinity J. Shockley, a student of the school, was arrested after an FBI tip alleged that she planned on using an AR-15 to shoot up the school two days later on Valentine's Day. Detectives found several AR-15 magazines, a box of .40 caliber rounds, a soft body-armor vest, and a collage of numerous mass murderers inside her bedroom. The collage included pictures of Charleston church shooter Dylann Roof and Parkland school shooter Nikolas Cruz, the latter of whom Shockley admitted to authorities to having a crush on. She used a male pseudonym online. School counselors told police that she tried to get help for mental health issues but that her father denied her access to school resources.

Shockley was charged with one count of conspiracy to commit murder, two counts of intimidation, and one count of threatening to commit terrorism. She was originally being held in the Morgan County Jail without bond, however her bond was later set at $1,500,000. Authorities determined her mental health issues and frequent bullying was what led her to want to commit an attack. On October 27, 2025, Shockley pleaded guilty to one count of conspiracy to commit murder, and was sentenced in 12 years in prison, along with 5 years of probation and a $590 fine. She is also required to see a qualified mental health professional upon release. She is also banned from all local school property and events, from owning a firearm, and from researching school shootings. Before she was sentenced, Shockley apologized to a classmate she intended to target, saying; "I am so sorry I put you in that position of fear."

== Notable alumni ==
Mooresville High School has had several graduates go on to prestigious careers, including:

- Sammy Lee Davis, Medal of Honor recipient – Davis is known at The "Real" Forrest Gump as parts of his Vietnam story and footage for his Medal of Honor ceremony were utilized in the Forrest Gump movie.
- Joseph Van Bokkelen, federal judge – Van Bokkelen serves as a judge in the United States District Court for the Northern District of Indiana.
- William G. Bray, United States Representative – Bray served the U.S. House of Representatives from 1951 to 1967.
- Clifford C. Furnas, Olympian – Furnas was an American author, Olympic athlete, scientist, expert on guided missiles, university president, and public servant.
- Stu O’Dell, former football linebacker for the then Washington Redskins, and Baltimore Colts. Playing in 39 games between 1974 and 1978.

== See also ==
- List of high schools in Indiana
