= Rodolfo Lozano =

American judge (1942–2018)

Senior Judge of the United States District Court for the Northern District of Indiana
- In office July 10, 2007 – July 11, 2018

Judge of the United States District Court for the Northern District of Indiana
- In office February 26, 1988 – July 10, 2007
- Appointed by: Ronald Reagan
- Preceded by: Michael Stephen Kanne
- Succeeded by: Joseph S. Van Bokkelen

Personal details
- Born: July 10, 1942 East Chicago, Indiana, U.S.
- Died: July 11, 2018 (aged 76)
- Education: Indiana University Bloomington (BS, LLB)

Rodolfo "Rudy" Lozano (July 10, 1942 – July 11, 2018) was a United States district judge of the United States District Court for the Northern District of Indiana.

== Education and career ==
Born in East Chicago, Indiana, Lozano received a Bachelor of Science degree from Indiana University Bloomington in 1963 and a Bachelor of Laws from Indiana University Maurer School of Law in 1966. He was in the United States Army Reserve from 1966 to 1973. He was in private practice in Merrillville, Indiana from 1966 to 1988.

== Federal judicial service ==
On December 4, 1987, Lozano was nominated by President Ronald Reagan to a seat on the United States District Court for the Northern District of Indiana vacated by Judge Michael Stephen Kanne. Lozano was confirmed by the United States Senate on February 25, 1988, and received his commission on February 26, 1988. He assumed senior status on July 10, 2007, serving in that status until his death on July 11, 2018.

In 2021, the United States Courthouse at 5400 Federal Plaza, Hammond, Indiana named a courtroom on the fourth floor, "The Judge Rodolfo 'Rudy' Lozano Courtroom" in his honor.

== See also ==
- List of Hispanic and Latino American jurists

== Sources ==
Legal offices
Preceded by Michael Stephen Kanne	Judge of the United States District Court for the Northern District of Indiana; 1988–2007	Succeeded by Joseph S. Van Bokkelen
