= Robert Lowell Miller Jr. =

American judge (born 1950)

Robert Miller

Judge of the United States Foreign Intelligence Surveillance Court of Review
- In office July 8, 2020 – September 15, 2023
- Preceded by: José A. Cabranes
- Succeeded by: Lisa Godbey Wood

Senior Judge of the United States District Court for the Northern District of Indiana
- Incumbent
- Assumed office January 11, 2016

Chief Judge of the United States District Court for the Northern District of Indiana
- In office February 3, 2003 – February 2, 2010
- Preceded by: William Charles Lee
- Succeeded by: Philip P. Simon

Judge of the United States District Court for the Northern District of Indiana
- In office December 17, 1985 – January 11, 2016
- Appointed by: Ronald Reagan
- Preceded by: Seat established by 98 Stat. 333
- Succeeded by: Damon R. Leichty

Judge of the St. Joseph County Superior Court
- In office January 7, 1976 – December 17, 1985
- Appointed by: Otis R. Bowen

Personal details
- Born: November 21, 1950 (age 75) South Bend, Indiana, U.S.
- Education: Northwestern University (BA); Indiana University (JD)

Robert Lowell Miller Jr. (born November 21, 1950) is an inactive United States district judge of the United States District Court for the Northern District of Indiana.

== Education and career ==
Miller was born in South Bend, Indiana. He received a Bachelor of Arts degree from Northwestern University in 1972. He received a Juris Doctor from Indiana University Robert H. McKinney School of Law in 1975. He was a law clerk for the United States District Court for the Northern District of Indiana in 1975. He was a judge of the St. Joseph County Superior Court in South Bend from 1975 to 1985.

=== Federal judicial service ===
Miller was nominated by President Ronald Reagan on October 23, 1985, to the United States District Court for the Northern District of Indiana, to a new seat created by 98 Stat. 333. He was confirmed by the United States Senate on December 16, 1985, and received his commission on December 17, 1985. He served as Chief Judge from February 3, 2003, to February 2, 2010. He assumed senior status on January 11, 2016.

On July 8, 2020, Miller was appointed to the United States Foreign Intelligence Surveillance Court of Review by Chief Justice John Roberts.

On August 3, 2023, it was announced that would assume inactive senior status in August 2023.

== Sources ==
Legal offices
Preceded by Seat established by 98 Stat. 333	Judge of the United States District Court for the Northern District of Indiana; 1985–2016	Succeeded by Damon R. Leichty
Preceded by William Charles Lee	Chief Judge of the United States District Court for the Northern District of Indiana; 2003–2010	Succeeded by Philip P. Simon
Preceded by José A. Cabranes	Judge of the United States Foreign Intelligence Surveillance Court of Review; 2020–2023	Succeeded by Lisa Godbey Wood
