= Allen Sharp =

American judge

Senior Judge of the United States District Court for the Northern District of Indiana
- In office November 1, 2007 – July 10, 2009

Chief Judge of the United States District Court for the Northern District of Indiana
- In office 1981–1996
- Preceded by: Jesse E. Eschbach
- Succeeded by: William Charles Lee

Judge of the United States District Court for the Northern District of Indiana
- In office October 11, 1973 – November 1, 2007
- Appointed by: Richard Nixon
- Preceded by: Robert A. Grant
- Succeeded by: Jon DeGuilio

Personal details
- Born: Allen Sharp; February 11, 1932 Washington, D.C.
- Died: July 10, 2009 (aged 77) Granger, Indiana
- Education: Indiana State University (B.A.); Indiana University Maurer School of Law (J.D.); Butler University (M.A.)

Allen Sharp (February 11, 1932 – July 9, 2009) was a United States district judge of the United States District Court for the Northern District of Indiana.

== Education and career ==
Born in Washington, D.C., and raised in the small town of Story Indiana, Sharp received a Bachelor of Arts degree from Indiana State University in 1953, a Juris Doctor from Indiana University Maurer School of Law in 1957, and later received a Master of Arts from Butler University in 1986. He was a United States Air Force Reserve Lieutenant Colonel from 1957 to 1984. He was in private practice of law in Williamsport, Indiana from 1957 to 1968. He was a judge of the Indiana Court of Appeals from 1969 to 1973.

== Federal judicial service ==
On September 13, 1973, Sharp was nominated by President Richard Nixon to a seat on the United States District Court for the Northern District of Indiana vacated by Judge Robert A. Grant. Sharp was confirmed by the United States Senate on October 4, 1973, and received his commission on October 11, 1973. He served as Chief Judge from 1981 to 1996, and assumed senior status on November 1, 2007, and served in that capacity until his death on July 9, 2009, in Granger, Indiana.

== See also ==
- List of United States federal judges by longevity of service

== Sources ==
- The Oral History of Allen Sharp (2007).

Legal offices
Preceded by Robert A. Grant	Judge of the United States District Court for the Northern District of Indiana; 1973–2007	Succeeded by Jon DeGuilio
Preceded by Jesse E. Eschbach	Chief Judge of the United States District Court for the Northern District of Indiana; 1981–1996	Succeeded by William Charles Lee
