= Philip P. Simon =

American judge for Northern District Court of Indiana

Chief Judge of the United States District Court for the Northern District of Indiana
- In office 2010–2017
- Preceded by: Robert Lowell Miller Jr.
- Succeeded by: Theresa Lazar Springmann

Judge of the United States District Court for the Northern District of Indiana
- Incumbent
- Assumed office March 27, 2003
- Appointed by: George W. Bush
- Preceded by: William Charles Lee

Personal details
- Born: Philip Peter Simon Pittsburgh, Pennsylvania, U.S.
- Education: University of Iowa (BA); Indiana University (JD)

Philip Peter Simon is a United States district judge of the United States District Court for the Northern District of Indiana.

== Early life and education ==
Simon was born in Pittsburgh. He earned a Bachelor of Arts degree from the University of Iowa in 1984. He received a Juris Doctor from Indiana University School of Law in 1987.

== Career ==
Simon began his career in private practice at the Chicago law firm Kirkland & Ellis, where he worked from 1987 to 1990. He then joined the U.S. Attorney’s Office for the Northern District of Indiana, serving as an assistant United States attorney from 1990 to 1997. During this period, he also taught as an adjunct professor at Valparaiso University School of Law from 1996 to 1997. Simon next served as an assistant United States attorney in the District of Arizona from 1997 to 1999, before returning to the Northern District of Indiana, where he was an assistant United States attorney and chief of the criminal division from 1999 to 2003.

=== Federal judicial service ===
Simon was nominated by President George W. Bush on January 29, 2003, to serve as a United States district judge of the United States District Court for the Northern District of Indiana, to a seat vacated by Judge William Charles Lee. He was confirmed by the United States Senate on March 27, 2003, and received his commission the same day. He served as chief judge from 2010 to 2017.

=== Seventh Circuit nomination ===
On September 26, 2008, President George W. Bush nominated Simon to a seat on the United States Court of Appeals for the Seventh Circuit vacated by Judge Kenneth F. Ripple, who took senior status on September 1, 2008. Since Simon was nominated after July 1, 2008, which is the unofficial start date of the Thurmond Rule during a presidential election year, no hearings were scheduled by the United States Senate on Simon's nomination, and the nomination was returned to Bush at the end of his presidential term. In March 2009, President Barack Obama announced his intention to nominate Simon's colleague, Judge David Hamilton to the vacancy, and Hamilton was confirmed to the seat on November 19, 2009.

Legal offices
Preceded by William Charles Lee	Judge of the United States District Court for the Northern District of Indiana; 2003–present	Incumbent
Preceded by Robert Lowell Miller Jr.	Chief Judge of the United States District Court for the Northern District of Indiana; 2010–2017	Succeeded by Theresa Lazar Springmann
