= William Charles Lee =

American judge (1938–2024)

Senior Judge of the United States District Court for the Northern District of Indiana
- In office February 3, 2003 – January 20, 2024

Chief Judge of the United States District Court for the Northern District of Indiana
- In office 1997–2003
- Preceded by: Allen Sharp
- Succeeded by: Robert Lowell Miller Jr.

Judge of the United States District Court for the Northern District of Indiana
- In office July 28, 1981 – February 3, 2003
- Appointed by: Ronald Reagan
- Preceded by: Seat established by 92 Stat. 1629
- Succeeded by: Philip P. Simon

United States Attorney for the Northern District of Indiana
- In office 1970–1973
- President: Richard Nixon
- Preceded by: Alfred Moellering
- Succeeded by: John R. Wilks

Personal details
- Born: February 2, 1938 Fort Wayne, Indiana, U.S.
- Died: January 20, 2024 (aged 85)
- Education: Yale University (AB); University of Chicago (JD)

William Charles Lee (February 2, 1938 – January 20, 2024) was a United States district judge of the United States District Court for the Northern District of Indiana.

== Education and career ==
Born in Fort Wayne, Indiana, Lee received an Artium Baccalaureus degree from Yale University in 1959 and a J.D. degree from the University of Chicago Law School in 1962. He was in private practice in Fort Wayne from 1962 to 1970. He was a deputy prosecuting attorney of Allen County, Indiana from 1963 to 1969. He was the United States attorney for the Northern District of Indiana from 1970 to 1973. He was in private practice in Fort Wayne from 1973 to 1981.

=== Federal judicial service ===
Lee was nominated by President Ronald Reagan on July 1, 1981, to the United States District Court for the Northern District of Indiana, to a new seat created by 92 Stat. 1629. He was confirmed by the United States Senate on July 27, 1981, and received his commission on July 28, 1981. He served as chief judge from 1997 to 2003. He assumed senior status on February 3, 2003. Lee died on January 20, 2024, at the age of 85.

== Sources ==
Legal offices
Preceded by Alfred Moellering	United States Attorney for the Northern District of Indiana; 1970–1973	Succeeded by John R. Wilks
Preceded by Seat established by 92 Stat. 1629	Judge of the United States District Court for the Northern District of Indiana; 1981–2003	Succeeded by Philip P. Simon
Preceded by Allen Sharp	Chief Judge of the United States District Court for the Northern District of Indiana; 1997–2003	Succeeded by Robert Lowell Miller Jr.
