= George N. Beamer =

American judge

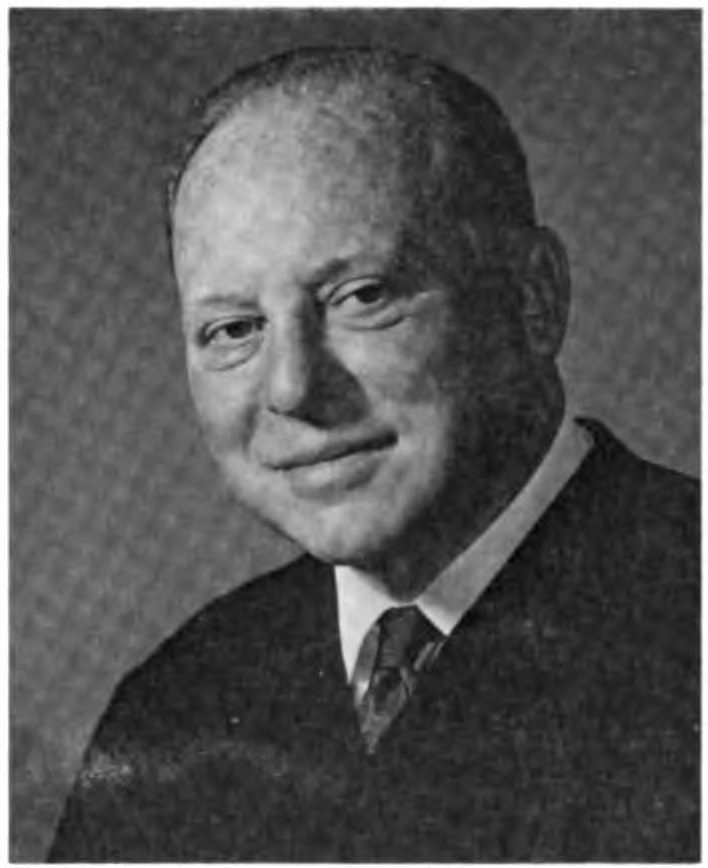

Chief Judge of the United States District Court for the Northern District of Indiana
- In office 1972–1974
- Preceded by: Robert A. Grant
- Succeeded by: Jesse E. Eschbach

Judge of the United States District Court for the Northern District of Indiana
- In office April 12, 1962 – October 21, 1974
- Appointed by: John F. Kennedy
- Preceded by: Seat established by 75 Stat. 80
- Succeeded by: Phil McClellan McNagny Jr.

30th Indiana Attorney General
- In office January 15, 1941 – January 11, 1943
- Governor: Henry F. Schricker
- Preceded by: Samuel D. Jackson
- Succeeded by: James Emmert

Personal details
- Born: George Noah Beamer; October 9, 1904 Bowling Green, Indiana, US
- Died: October 21, 1974 (aged 70)
- Education: Notre Dame Law School (LL.B.)

George Noah Beamer (October 9, 1904 – October 21, 1974) was an American judge and politician who served as United States district judge of the United States District Court for the Northern District of Indiana. Beamer also served also the 30th Indiana Attorney General from 1941 to 1943.

== Education and career ==
Born in Bowling Green, Indiana, Beamer received a Bachelor of Laws from Notre Dame Law School in 1929. He was in private practice in South Bend, Indiana from 1929 to 1962. He was a City Judge in South Bend from 1933 to 1935, a prosecuting attorney of St. Joseph County, Indiana from 1937 to 1939, and a city attorney of South Bend from 1939 to 1941. Beamer, a Democrat, held the office of Attorney General of Indiana from 1941 to 1943, serving in the administration of Democratic Governor Henry F. Schricker. Beamer was Chairman of the Indiana Public Service Commission in Indianapolis from 1943 to 1944.

== Federal judicial service ==
On March 8, 1962, Beamer was nominated by President John F. Kennedy to a new seat on the United States District Court for the Northern District of Indiana created by 75 Stat. 80. He was confirmed by the United States Senate on April 11, 1962, and received his commission on April 12, 1962. He served as Chief Judge from 1972 until his death on October 21, 1974.

== Sources ==
Political offices
Preceded by Samuel D. Jackson	Indiana Attorney General; 1941-1943	Succeeded by James Emmert
Legal offices
Preceded by Seat established by 75 Stat. 80	Judge of the United States District Court for the Northern District of Indiana; 1962–1974	Succeeded by Phil McClellan McNagny Jr.
Preceded by Robert A. Grant	Chief Judge of the United States District Court for the Northern District of Indiana; 1972–1974	Succeeded by Jesse E. Eschbach
