= Theresa Lazar Springmann =

American judge (born 1956)

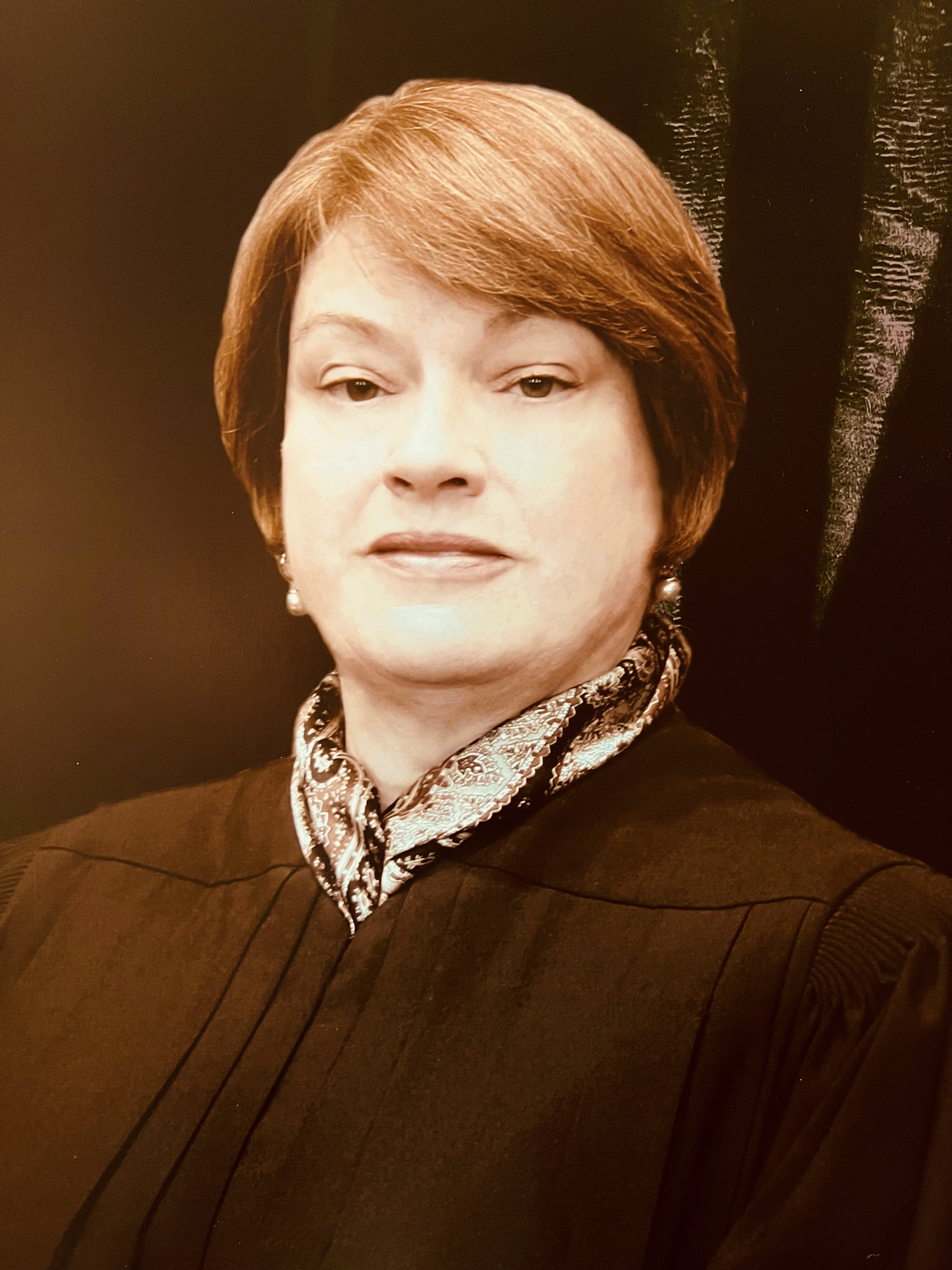
- Portrait of Theresa Lazar Springmann

Senior Judge of the United States District Court for the Northern District of Indiana
- Incumbent
- Assumed office January 23, 2021

Chief Judge of the United States District Court for the Northern District of Indiana
- In office February 3, 2017 – May 31, 2020
- Preceded by: Philip P. Simon
- Succeeded by: Jon DeGuilio

Judge of the United States District Court for the Northern District of Indiana
- In office June 24, 2003 – January 23, 2021
- Appointed by: George W. Bush
- Preceded by: James Tyne Moody
- Succeeded by: Cristal C. Brisco

Magistrate Judge of the United States District Court for the Northern District of Indiana
- In office 1995–2003

Personal details
- Born: January 23, 1956 (age 70) Gary, Indiana, U.S.
- Education: Indiana University Northwest (BA); University of Notre Dame (JD)

Theresa Lazar Springmann (born January 23, 1956) is a senior United States district judge of the United States District Court for the Northern District of Indiana.

== Early life and education ==
Born in Gary, Indiana, as the third of four children and the granddaughter of immigrants from Ireland and Russia. In 1977, Springmann graduated summa cum laude from Indiana University Northwest with a Bachelor of Arts degree and later from Notre Dame Law School with a Juris Doctor in 1980.

== Career ==
Following law school graduation, she worked as a law clerk for Judge James Tyne Moody of the United States District Court for the Northern District of Indiana from 1980 to 1983. She was in private practice in Indiana from 1984 to 1995. She served as a United States magistrate judge of the Northern District of Indiana from 1995 to 2003.

=== Federal judicial service ===
On the recommendation of Senator Richard Lugar, Springmann was nominated to the United States District Court for the Northern District of Indiana by President George W. Bush on January 29, 2003, to a seat vacated by Judge James Tyne Moody. Springmann was confirmed by the Senate on March 31, 2003, on a Senate vote and received her commission on June 24, 2003. She served as chief judge from February 3, 2017, to May 31, 2020. She assumed senior status on January 23, 2021, her 65th birthday.

=== Notable rulings ===
In May 1997, a John M. Stephenson received a guilty verdict and death sentence for killing three people in Warrick County, Indiana. He appealed his case to the Indiana Supreme Court on the basis of "ineffective counsel" because his attorney didn't object to him wearing a stun belt in front of the jury that convicted him. In April 2007, the Indiana Supreme Court unanimously rejected his appeal.

After the Indiana Supreme Court rejected Stephenson's appeal, he took it to the federal level, where Judge Springmann overturned his guilty sentence and the death penalty in a 26-page ruling. She noted, "Due process mandates that John M. Stephenson is entitled to what he was denied: a trial without restraints".

The Seventh Circuit Court of Appeals reversed and remanded. On remand, Judge Springmann ruled that Stephenson had not been prejudiced by his lawyer's failure to object to his having to wear a stun belt visible to jurors in the penalty phase of the litigation. In 2017, on appeal for the second time, Seventh Circuit Court of Appeals affirmed in part and reversed in part. The appellate court ruled that Stephenson was not entitled to habeas relief with respect to his murder conviction, but that he was entitled to a new sentencing hearing because his attorney was ineffective for failing to object to his having to wear a stun belt.

== Sources ==
Legal offices
Preceded by James Tyne Moody	Judge of the United States District Court for the Northern District of Indiana; 2003–2021	Succeeded by Cristal C. Brisco
Preceded by Philip P. Simon	Chief Judge of the United States District Court for the Northern District of Indiana; 2017–2020	Succeeded by Jon DeGuilio
