= Jesse E. Eschbach =

American judge (1920–2005)

Senior Judge of the United States Court of Appeals for the Seventh Circuit
- In office November 4, 1985 – October 25, 2005

Judge of the United States Court of Appeals for the Seventh Circuit
- In office December 1, 1981 – November 4, 1985
- Appointed by: Ronald Reagan
- Preceded by: Luther Merritt Swygert
- Succeeded by: Michael Stephen Kanne

Chief Judge of the United States District Court for the Northern District of Indiana
- In office 1974–1981
- Preceded by: George N. Beamer
- Succeeded by: Allen Sharp

Judge of the United States District Court for the Northern District of Indiana
- In office April 13, 1962 – December 11, 1981
- Appointed by: John F. Kennedy
- Preceded by: Luther Merritt Swygert
- Succeeded by: James Tyne Moody

Personal details
- Born: Jesse Ernest Eschbach; October 26, 1920 Warsaw, Indiana
- Died: October 25, 2005 (aged 84)
- Education: Indiana University Bloomington (BS); Indiana University Maurer School of Law (JD)

Jesse Ernest Eschbach (October 26, 1920 – October 25, 2005) was a United States district judge of the United States District Court for the Northern District of Indiana and a United States Circuit Judge of the United States Court of Appeals for the Seventh Circuit.

== Education and career ==
Born in Warsaw, Indiana, Eschbach received a Bachelor of Science degree from Indiana University Bloomington in 1943. He received a Juris Doctor from Indiana University Maurer School of Law in 1949. He was a United States Navy Lieutenant from 1943 to 1946. He was in private practice of law in Warsaw from 1949 to 1962. He served in the Economic Stabilization Agency in Washington, D.C. in 1951. He was a city attorney of Warsaw from 1952 to 1953. He was a deputy prosecuting attorney of 54th Judicial Circuit, Indiana from 1953 to 1954. He was President, secretary and general counsel for Dalton Foundries, Inc. from 1959 to 1962. He was President of Endicott Church Furniture, Inc. from 1960 to 1962.

== Federal judicial service ==
Eschbach was nominated by President John F. Kennedy on March 12, 1962, to a seat on the United States District Court for the Northern District of Indiana vacated by Judge Luther Merritt Swygert. He was confirmed by the United States Senate on April 2, 1962, and received commission on April 13, 1962. He served as Chief Judge from 1974 to 1981. His service was terminated on December 11, 1981, due to elevation to the Seventh Circuit.

Eschbach was nominated by President Ronald Reagan on October 20, 1981, to a seat on the United States Court of Appeals for the Seventh Circuit vacated by Judge Luther Merritt Swygert. He was confirmed by the Senate on November 24, 1981, and received commission on December 1, 1981. He assumed senior status on November 4, 1985. He took inactive senior status on October 1, 2000. His service was terminated on October 25, 2005, due to death.

== Notable cases ==
One of Eschbach's most controversial decisions as a district judge was in the case of Sparkman v. McFarlin, Civ. No. F 75-129 (ND Ind., May 13, 1976), in which he held that a DeKalb County judge who ordered the sterilization of a young woman without appointing a guardian ad litem to protect her interests or holding a hearing to take evidence in her case could not be sued for damages. Eschbach's decision was upheld by the United States Supreme Court in Stump v. Sparkman, 435 U.S. 349 (1978), now the leading American decision on judicial immunity. Eschbach received national attention in 1981 when he sentenced former Secretary of Agriculture Earl Butz to 30 days in federal prison for tax fraud. During the air traffic controllers' strike the same year, he ordered controllers in Fort Wayne to continue working.

== Sources ==
Legal offices
Preceded by Luther Merritt Swygert	Judge of the United States District Court for the Northern District of Indiana; 1962–1981	Succeeded by James Tyne Moody
Preceded by George N. Beamer	Chief Judge of the United States District Court for the Northern District of Indiana; 1974–1981	Succeeded by Allen Sharp
Preceded by Luther Merritt Swygert	Judge of the United States Court of Appeals for the Seventh Circuit; 1981–1985	Succeeded by Michael Stephen Kanne
