= Jon DeGuilio =

American judge (born 1955)

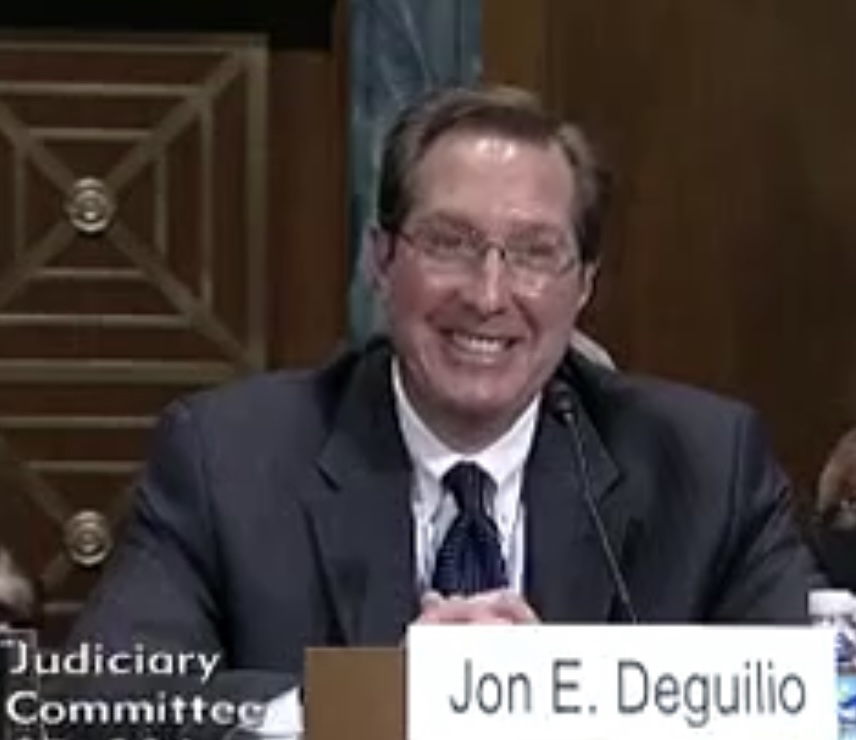

Senior Judge of the United States District Court for the Northern District of Indiana
- Incumbent
- Assumed office July 17, 2023

Chief Judge of the United States District Court for the Northern District of Indiana
- In office June 1, 2020 – July 17, 2023
- Preceded by: Theresa Lazar Springmann
- Succeeded by: Holly A. Brady

Judge of the United States District Court for the Northern District of Indiana
- In office May 13, 2010 – July 17, 2023
- Appointed by: Barack Obama
- Preceded by: Allen Sharp
- Succeeded by: Gretchen S. Lund

United States Attorney for the Northern District of Indiana
- In office 1993–1999
- Appointed by: Bill Clinton
- Preceded by: John Hoehner
- Succeeded by: Joseph S. Van Bokkelen

Personal details
- Born: 1955 (age 70–71) Hammond, Indiana, U.S.
- Education: Purdue University; University of Notre Dame (BA); Valparaiso University (JD)

Jon Ernest DeGuilio (born 1955) is a senior United States district judge of the United States District Court for the Northern District of Indiana.

== Early life and education ==
Born in Hammond, Indiana, DeGuilio earned a Bachelor of Arts degree from the University of Notre Dame in 1977 after first beginning his college career at Purdue University. He then earned a Juris Doctor from the Valparaiso University School of Law in 1981.

== Career ==
From 1981 until 1989, DeGuilio served as an associate for a Schererville, Indiana law firm, during which time he also served part-time as a deputy prosecutor and public defender for Lake County, Indiana and as a City Councilman (1984–1987) in Hammond. From 1989 until 1993, DeGuilio served as a prosecuting attorney for Lake County and then from 1993 until 1999 he was the United States attorney for the Northern District of Indiana. In 1999, he served briefly as a partner in the South Bend, Indiana office of the Barnes & Thornburg law firm before taking a job with Peoples Bank SB/NorthWest Indiana Bancorp in 1999. From 1999 until 2001, he served as a senior vice president and trust officer, and from 2001 was the bank's general counsel and corporate secretary until becoming a federal judge.

=== Federal judicial service ===
In January 2009, DeGuilio informed Indiana Senator Evan Bayh of his interest in a vacant federal district judgeship. On January 20, 2010, President Obama nominated DeGuilio to the position, which was vacated by Judge Allen Sharp, who took senior status in November 2007 and died in 2009. On March 4, 2010, the United States Senate Committee on the Judiciary voted to send DeGuilio's nomination to the full Senate. On May 11, 2010, the full Senate confirmed DeGuilio in a voice vote. He received his judicial commission on May 13, 2010. He became chief judge on June 1, 2020. He assumed senior status on July 17, 2023.

== Sources ==
- Jon DeGuilio at Ballotpedia

Legal offices
Preceded by Allen Sharp	Judge of the United States District Court for the Northern District of Indiana; 2010–2023	Succeeded by Gretchen S. Lund
Preceded by Theresa Lazar Springmann	Chief Judge of the United States District Court for the Northern District of Indiana; 2020–2023	Succeeded by Holly A. Brady
