= Thomas Whitten Slick =

American judge

Judge of the United States District Court for the Northern District of Indiana
- In office April 21, 1928 – September 16, 1943
- Appointed by: operation of law
- Preceded by: Seat established by 45 Stat. 437
- Succeeded by: Luther Merritt Swygert

Judge of the United States District Court for the District of Indiana
- In office February 17, 1925 – April 21, 1928
- Appointed by: Calvin Coolidge
- Preceded by: Seat established by 43 Stat. 751
- Succeeded by: Seat abolished

Personal details
- Born: Thomas Whitten Slick; July 5, 1869 South Bend, Indiana
- Died: January 3, 1959 (aged 89)
- Education: University of Michigan Law School (LL.B.)

Thomas Whitten Slick (July 5, 1869 – January 3, 1959) was a United States District Judge of the United States District Court for the District of Indiana and the United States District Court for the Northern District of Indiana.

== Education and career ==
Born in South Bend, Indiana, Slick received a Bachelor of Laws from the University of Michigan Law School in 1893. He was in private practice in South Bend from 1893 to 1925, serving as a Prosecuting Attorney of St. Joseph County, Indiana from 1896 to 1900, and as City Attorney of South Bend from 1918 to 1922.

== Federal judicial service ==
Slick was nominated by President Calvin Coolidge on February 6, 1925, to the United States District Court for the District of Indiana, to a new seat authorized by 43 Stat. 751. He was confirmed by the United States Senate on February 17, 1925, and received his commission the same day. Slick was reassigned by operation of law to the United States District Court for the Northern District of Indiana on April 21, 1928, to a new seat authorized by 45 Stat. 437. His service terminated on September 16, 1943, due to his retirement.

== Death ==
Slick died on January 3, 1959.

== Sources ==
Legal offices
Preceded by Seat established by 43 Stat. 751	Judge of the United States District Court for the District of Indiana; 1925–1928	Succeeded by Seat abolished
Preceded by Seat established by 45 Stat. 437	Judge of the United States District Court for the Northern District of Indiana; 1928–1943	Succeeded by Luther Merritt Swygert
