= Alfred Moellering =

American judge

Alfred W. Moellering

ALLEN Superior Court Judge
- In office 1971–1991

United States Attorney for the Northern District of Indiana
- In office 1962–1970
- President: John F. Kennedy; Lyndon B. Johnson; Richard Nixon
- Preceded by: Philip C. Potts
- Succeeded by: William Charles Lee

Personal details
- Born: December 13, 1926 Fort Wayne, Indiana, US
- Died: June 2, 2013 (aged 86)
- Party: Democratic
- Spouse: Carol L. Wortman Moellering
- Parents: William Moellering (father); Hilda Dreyer Moellering (mother)
- Education: Indiana University; Indiana University School of Law

Military service
- Allegiance: United States
- Branch/service: US Army
- Years of service: 1945–1947
- Battles/wars: World War II

Alfred W. Moellering (December 13, 1926 – June 2, 2013) was an American lawyer and judge who was the United States Attorney for the Northern District of Indiana under three presidents.

== Biography ==
Alfred Moellering was born on December 13, 1926, in Fort Wayne, Indiana. He graduated from South Side High School in 1945 which was followed by his enrollment in the US army. He was a World War II Army veteran and stayed in the army until 1947. He then went on to Indiana School of Business in 1951 and Indiana University School of Law in 1953. He was a member of St. Paul's Lutheran Church. He was appointed United States Attorney for the Northern District of Indiana by President Kennedy in 1962 and served in that position until 1970. He then was elected Superior Court Judge in 1971 and retired from the bench in 1991 after 20 years.
