= Robert A. Grant =

American judge

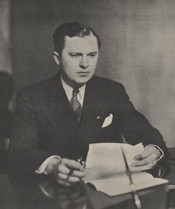

Senior Judge of the United States District Court for the Northern District of Indiana
- In office December 1, 1972 – March 2, 1998

Chief Judge of the United States District Court for the Northern District of Indiana
- In office 1961–1972
- Preceded by: Luther Merritt Swygert
- Succeeded by: George N. Beamer

Judge of the United States District Court for the Northern District of Indiana
- In office August 26, 1957 – December 1, 1972
- Appointed by: Dwight D. Eisenhower
- Preceded by: William Lynn Parkinson
- Succeeded by: Allen Sharp

Member of the U.S. House of Representatives from Indiana's 3rd district
- In office January 3, 1939 – January 3, 1949
- Preceded by: Samuel B. Pettengill
- Succeeded by: Thurman C. Crook

Personal details
- Born: Robert Allen Grant; July 31, 1905 Bourbon, Indiana
- Died: March 2, 1998 (aged 92) Sarasota, Florida
- Party: Republican
- Education: University of Notre Dame (A.B.); Notre Dame Law School (J.D.)

Robert Allen Grant (July 31, 1905 – March 2, 1998) was an American lawyer and politician who served five terms as a United States representative from Indiana and later a United States district judge of the United States District Court for the Northern District of Indiana.

== Education and career ==
Born near Bourbon, Indiana, Grant moved to Hamlet, Indiana in 1912 and to South Bend, Indiana in 1922. He attended the public schools and received an Artium Baccalaureus degree, cum laude, from the University of Notre Dame in 1928, and a Juris Doctor, also cum laude, from Notre Dame Law School in 1930. He was admitted to the bar in 1930 and commenced practice in South Bend. He married Margaret A. McLaren on September 17, 1933. He was a deputy prosecuting attorney of St. Joseph County, Indiana in 1935 and 1936, returning to private practice until 1938.

== Congressional service ==
Grant was elected as a Republican to the Seventy-sixth and to the four succeeding Congresses, from January 3, 1939, to January 3, 1949. He was an unsuccessful candidate for reelection to the Eighty-first Congress in 1948, and resumed the practice of law in South Bend.

== Federal judicial service ==
On August 21, 1957, Grant was nominated by President Dwight D. Eisenhower to a seat on the United States District Court for the Northern District of Indiana vacated by Judge W. Lynn Parkinson. Grant was confirmed by the United States Senate on August 22, 1957, and received his commission on August 26, 1957. He served as Chief Judge from 1961 to 1972 and as a member of the Judicial Conference of the United States from 1969 to 1972, assuming senior status on December 1, 1972. In 1976, he was appointed by Chief Justice Warren E. Burger to the United States Temporary Emergency Court of Appeals, serving until 1993. He was also a visiting judge for twelve terms at the United States District Court for the District of Puerto Rico.

=== Death ===
Grant continued to serve in senior status until his death on March 2, 1998, in Sarasota, Florida.

== Honor ==
On September 25, 1992, the divisional courthouse for South Bend was rededicated as the Robert A. Grant Federal Building and U.S. Courthouse.

== Sources ==
- United States Congress. "Robert A. Grant (id: G000384)". Biographical Directory of the United States Congress.

U.S. House of Representatives
Preceded by Samuel B. Pettengill	Member of the U.S. House of Representatives from Indiana's 3rd congressional district 1939–1949	Succeeded by Thurman C. Crook
Legal offices
Preceded by William Lynn Parkinson	Judge of the United States District Court for the Northern District of Indiana; 1957–1972	Succeeded by Allen Sharp
Preceded by Luther Merritt Swygert	Chief Judge of the United States District Court for the Northern District of Indiana; 1961–1972	Succeeded by George N. Beamer
