= E. Ross Adair Federal Building and United States Courthouse =

- U.S. Post Office and Courthouse
- U.S. National Register of Historic Places
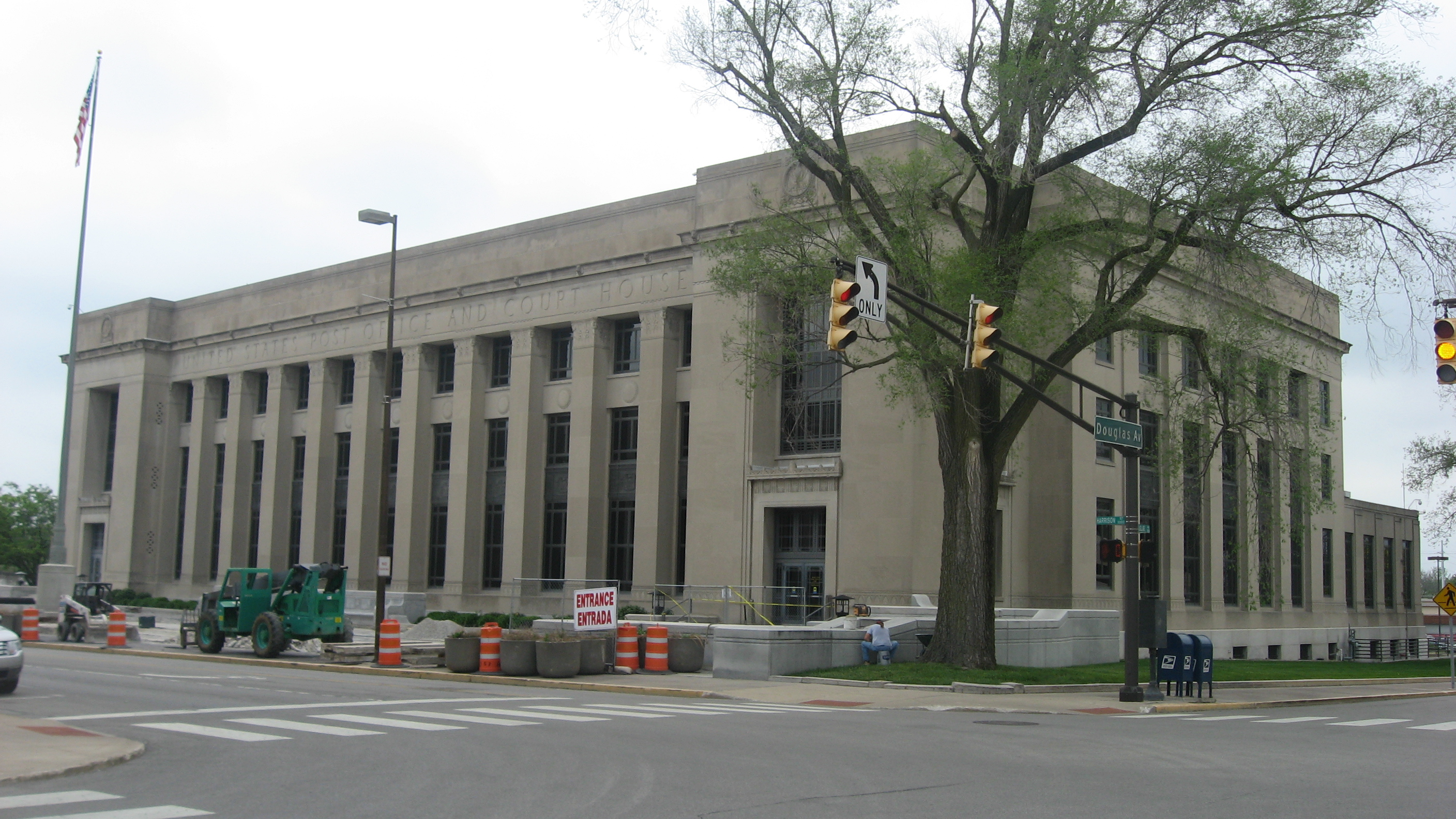
- Front and northern side of the courthouse

- Location within Indiana Location within the United States
- Location: 1300 W. Harrison St., Fort Wayne, Indiana
- Coordinates: 41°4′26″N 85°8′26″W
- Area: 2.5 acres (1.0 ha)
- Built: 1932
- Architect: Mahurin, Guy; et al.
- Architectural style: Art Deco, Starved Classicism
- NRHP reference No.: 06000125
- Added to NRHP: March 15, 2006

The E. Ross Adair Federal Building and U.S. Courthouse is a historic post office, courthouse, and federal office building located at Fort Wayne in Allen County, Indiana. The building is a courthouse of the United States District Court for the Northern District of Indiana. It was listed on the National Register of Historic Places in 2006 as U.S. Post Office and Courthouse.

== Building history ==
Fort Wayne historically served as a transportation and communication center located at the confluence of the St. Marys and St. Joseph rivers, which meet to form the Maumee River. In the 1840s, the Wabash and Erie Canal opened in Fort Wayne, and the town became a bustling business center. The population continued to increase when the arrival of the railroad boosted industrial growth. By the 1920s, Fort Wayne was an important city in the Midwest and consequently required federal services. Officials planned for a post office, federal office building, and federal courthouse. In 1928, Congress authorized funds for the acquisition of a site through the Public Buildings Act of 1926, which appropriated resources for federal buildings throughout the United States. Congress earmarked additional funds for construction through the same legislation. Federal officials retained private architects Guy Mahurin, who was from Fort Wayne, and Benjamin Morris, a New Yorker. The building was designed under the auspices of James A. Wetmore, acting supervising architect of the U.S. Treasury Department.

Excavation for the new building was completed in 1931. Many contracting firms submitted construction bids. Fortunately, the bids were lower than federal officials anticipated, which allowed impressive design features such as the entry plaza and marble floors to be incorporated into the project budget. Ralph Sollitt and Sons of South Bend, Indiana, constructed the building.

The building has a structural system of reinforced concrete and was one of the first large federal buildings to use this method rather than a steel frame. The reinforced concrete technique saved $30,000. Construction was completed in 1932, with an opening ceremony held on October 29 of that year.

In 2000, the building was named to honor E. Ross Adair, a Republican congressman from Indiana's Fourth District. Adair, who was born in Fort Wayne in 1907 and died there in 1983, served in the U.S. Army during World War II and was ambassador to Ethiopia from 1971 to 1974. He was in private legal practice at the time of his death.

The post office vacated the building in 1987. Currently, it houses the U.S. District Court, U.S. Bankruptcy Court, and other federal offices. The building was listed in the National Register of Historic Places in 2006 as U.S. Post Office and Courthouse.

== Architecture ==
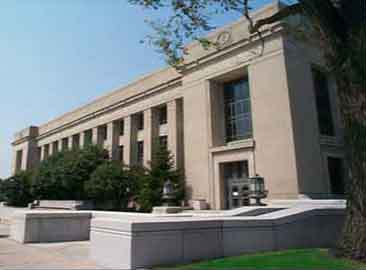
Closeup of the courthouse

The E. Ross Adair Federal Building and U.S. Courthouse occupies a parcel of land bounded by Douglas Avenue and Harrison, Brackenridge, and Webster streets. It is designed in the Stripped Classical style of architecture, which was frequently used for federal building design during the Depression era and was advocated by Louis A. Simon, who oversaw federal building design under Acting Supervising Architect James A. Wetmore. It features classically inspired symmetry, massing, and materials, but without the abundant ornamentation that was common on some earlier styles of federal architecture. Instead, its stylized decorative elements are characteristic of those found in Art Deco architecture. The imposing building portrayed the dignity and stability of the federal presence during a difficult time in American history.

The building rises three stories above a basement and is clad in gray-buff limestone with a granite base and entrance steps. Replacement aluminum sash windows are found throughout the building. The facade faces east toward the entry plaza and Harrison Street. The bays are divided by classically inspired columns with carved capitals in a stylized leaf pattern reminiscent of Corinthian columns. Eagle motifs are found on metal spandrel panels that separate the first and second floors; limestone panels with simple medallions separate the second and third levels. The building is topped by a cornice that contains the gutter system and features carved lion heads at evenly spaced intervals.

Projecting pavilions at each end of the facade contain entrances that are topped by original cast-aluminum grilles. The door openings have stone surrounds with carved cornices containing stylized floral and leaf patterns. Carved stone medallions containing eagle motifs are located above each entrance.

The interior contains several significant spaces that retain their historic finishes and features and continue to convey the grandeur of the building. The entry vestibules have floors covered in contrasting marble that forms a central star design with a diamond-shaped border. Walls are also clad in marble with molded door and window surrounds and fluted pilasters. Built-in marble benches are below windows. The pale marble is St. Genevieve Golden Vein and the darker marble is Verde Antique. Elaborate plaster coffered ceilings glazed a rich golden brown top the space.

The postal lobby on the first floor features marble floors, marble walls, decorative plaster ceilings, and ornamental cast-aluminum door and window surrounds. Although postal services are no longer located in the building, original postal window openings with cast aluminum surrounds and marble sills remain. Above the postal windows are large transom windows with leaded glass.

The district courtroom on the second floor is another important space. Its walls have dark green marble bases below mahogany wall panels with walnut burl inlay. Ornate bronze grilles and wall sconces are original features. The ornamental plaster cornice transitions into a plaster coffered ceiling with alternating octagonal and square designs that have been painted in a polychromatic color scheme.

One of the most impressive features of the site is the elaborate plaza along the Harrison Street facade. The plaza is reached by granite steps that contain a landing with a flagpole with a simply decorated bronze base. Integral granite benches form walls that enclose the plaza. The rear plaza bench, which is 40 feet long, is carved with the signs of the zodiac on the back while the arms have carved stylized leaf motifs.

== Significant events ==
- 1928: Congress authorizes funding for federal building in Fort Wayne under the Public Buildings Act of 1926
- 1931-1932: Building constructed
- 1987: Post Office vacates building
- 2000: Building renamed to honor E. Ross Adair
- 2006: Building listed in the National Register of Historic Places

== Building facts ==
- Location:1300 South Harrison Street
- Architects: Guy Mahurin and Benjamin Morris
- Construction Dates: 1931–1932
- Architectural Style: Stripped Classical
- Landmark Status: Listed in the National Register of Historic Places
- Primary Materials: Limestone and Granite Prominent
- Features: Stylized Art-Deco ornamentation; Reinforced concrete construction; Granite plaza

== See also ==
- List of United States post offices
- List of Art Deco architecture in Indiana
