= Phil McClellan McNagny Jr. =

American judge

Judge of the United States District Court for the Northern District of Indiana
- In office May 7, 1976 – March 28, 1981
- Appointed by: Gerald Ford
- Preceded by: George N. Beamer
- Succeeded by: Michael Stephen Kanne

Personal details
- Born: Phil McClellan McNagny Jr. July 16, 1924 Fort Wayne, Indiana
- Died: March 28, 1981 (aged 56)
- Education: Indiana University Maurer School of Law (LL.B.)

Phil McClellan McNagny Jr. (July 16, 1924 – March 28, 1981) was a United States district judge of the United States District Court for the Northern District of Indiana.

== Education and career ==
Born in Fort Wayne, Indiana, McNagny was in the United States Marine Corps during World War II, from 1943 to 1945. He received a Bachelor of Laws from Indiana University Maurer School of Law in 1950. He was in private practice in Angola, Indiana in 1950, and then in Columbia City, Indiana until 1976, interrupted by his service as the United States Attorney for the Northern District of Indiana, from 1953 to 1959.

== Federal judicial service ==
On June 24, 1975, McNagny was nominated by President Gerald Ford to a seat on the United States District Court for the Northern District of Indiana vacated by Judge George N. Beamer. McNagny was confirmed by the United States Senate on May 6, 1976, and received his commission on May 7, 1976. McNagny served in that capacity until his death, on March 28, 1981, after a long illness.

== Sources ==
Legal offices
Preceded by George N. Beamer	Judge of the United States District Court for the Northern District of Indiana; 1976–1981	Succeeded by Michael Stephen Kanne
