= Joseph S. Van Bokkelen =

American judge (born 1943)

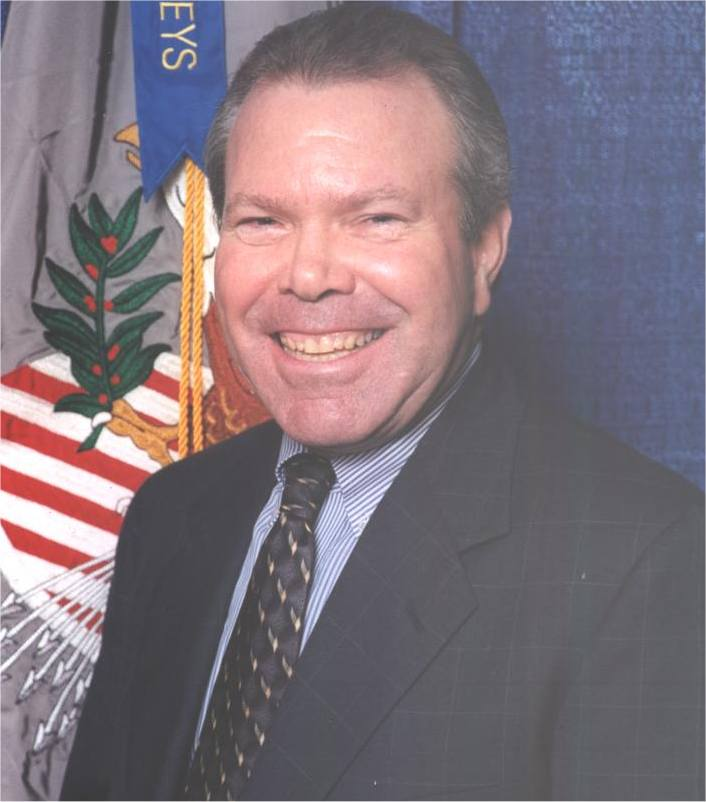

Senior Judge of the United States District Court for the Northern District of Indiana
- Incumbent
- Assumed office September 29, 2017

Judge of the United States District Court for the Northern District of Indiana
- In office July 18, 2007 – September 29, 2017
- Appointed by: George W. Bush
- Preceded by: Rodolfo Lozano
- Succeeded by: Holly A. Brady

United States Attorney for the Northern District of Indiana
- In office September 21, 2001 – July 2007
- Appointed by: George W. Bush
- Preceded by: Jon DeGuilio
- Succeeded by: David A. Capp

Personal details
- Born: Joseph S. Van Bokkelen; June 7, 1943 (age 82) Chicago, Illinois
- Education: Indiana University (BA, JD)

Joseph Scott Van Bokkelen (born June 7, 1943) is a senior United States district judge of the United States District Court for the Northern District of Indiana.

== Education and career ==
Van Bokkelen was born in Born in Chicago, Illinois and attended Mooresville High School. He received a Bachelor of Arts degree from Indiana University Bloomington in 1966 and a Juris Doctor f rom Indiana University School of Law in 1969. He was a Deputy attorney general of Office of the Indiana Attorney General from 1969 to 1970. He was an Assistant attorney general of Office of the Indiana Attorney General from 1971 to 1972. He was an Assistant United States Attorney of the United States Attorney's Office for the Northern District of Indiana from 1972 to 1975. He was in private practice in Indiana from 1975 to 2001. He was the United States Attorney for the Northern District of Indiana from 2001 to 2007.

== Federal judicial service ==
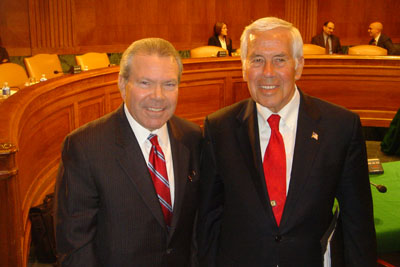
Van Bokkelen with Richard Lugar in 2007

On January 9, 2007, Van Bokkelen was nominated by President George W. Bush to a seat on the United States District Court for the Northern District of Indiana vacated by Rodolfo Lozano. Van Bokkelen was confirmed by the United States Senate on June 28, 2007, and received his commission on July 18, 2007. He assumed senior status on September 29, 2017. Van Bokkelen took inactive senior status as of July 7, 2025.

== Sources ==
Legal offices
Preceded by Jon DeGuilio	United States Attorney for the Northern District of Indiana; 2001–2007	Succeeded by David A. Capp
Preceded by Rodolfo Lozano	Judge of the United States District Court for the Northern District of Indiana; 2007–2017	Succeeded by Holly A. Brady
