= Courts of Indiana =

Indiana is a state in the United States. The law Courts of Indiana include:

State courts of Indiana

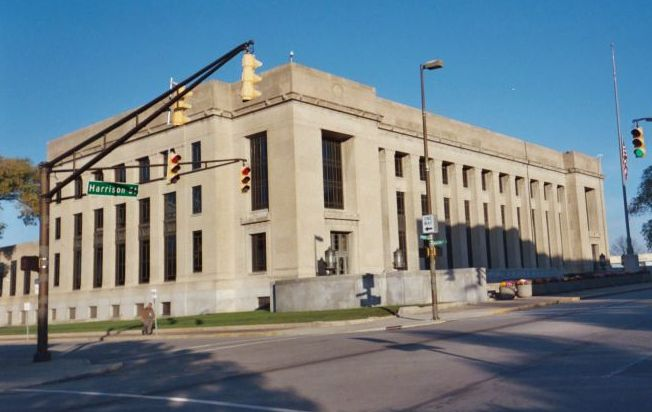
The E. Ross Adair Federal Building, seat of the Fort Wayne division of the U.S. District Court for the Northern District of Indiana

- Indiana Supreme Court
  - Indiana Court of Appeals (5 districts; previously Indiana Appellate Court)
  - Indiana Tax Court
    - Indiana Circuit Courts (91 circuits)
    - Indiana Superior Courts (177 divisions)
    - Indiana city and town courts

Federal courts located in Indiana

- United States District Court for the Northern District of Indiana
- United States District Court for the Southern District of Indiana

Former federal courts of Indiana

- United States District Court for the District of Indiana (extinct, subdivided)
