= Robert A. Grant Federal Building and U.S. Courthouse =

- Federal Building
- U.S. National Register of Historic Places
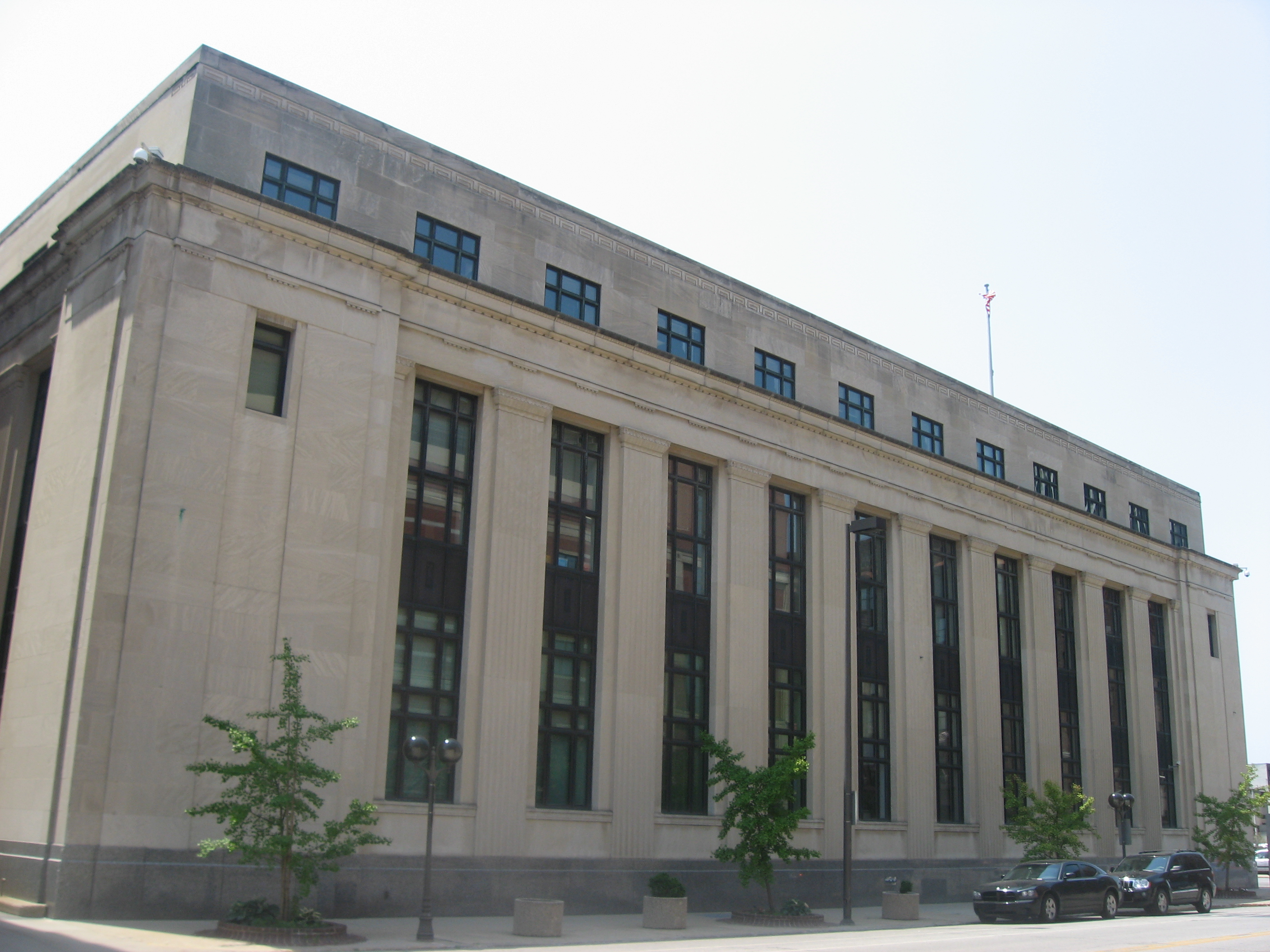
- Federal courthouse in South Bend, July 2012

- Location within Indiana Location within the United States
- Location: 204 S. Main St., South Bend, Indiana
- Coordinates: 41°40′29″N 86°15′06″W
- Built: c. 1932-1933
- Built by: Barnes, James I.
- Architect: Austin and Shambleau
- Architectural style: Art Deco, Art Moderne
- MPS: Downtown South Bend Historic MRA
- NRHP reference No.: 15000482
- Added to NRHP: August 3, 2015

Robert A. Grant Federal Building and U.S. Courthouse, also known as the Federal Building, is a historic post office and courthouse building located at South Bend, Indiana. It was designed by architect Austin and Shambleau and built in 1932–1933. It is a four-story, Art Deco / Art Moderne style building faced with Indiana limestone and Vermont granite. It housed a post office until 1973.

== Architectural description ==
The Robert A. Grant Federal Building and U.S. Courthouse is located on the southeast corner of the intersection of Main and Jefferson Streets in downtown South Bend, Indiana. The rectangular lot is bordered by Main Street on the west, Jefferson Street on the north, and city alleys on the east and south. Nearly the entire site is covered by the building. The building, with a full basement, three floors, and a mezzanine, has two primary elevations on the north and west. The building is designed in the Art Moderne or Art Deco style. The primary elevations have low relief and consist of pilasters alternating with bays of vertical strips of windows. The intercolumnar rhythm is flanked by slightly projecting corner pavilions. Entrances are located within these pavilions at either end of the west facade. The main block of the building is terminated by a continuous carved cornice. Above the cornice line is another floor set back from the face of the building.

The exterior walls are constructed with brick masonry faced with Indiana limestone and Vermont granite veneer, except for the third floor interior lightwells which have brick cladding. The primary elevations feature decorative elements of cast bronze. The original doors and windows have been replaced with new aluminum units. The building is covered with flat roof surfaces with the exception of the roof over the third floor courtroom which is a hopped and covered with standing seam copper.

The primary elevations of the building face west and north. The elevations have gray granite base and are clad with a smooth limestone veneer. The elevations are divided into ten bays of vertical window fenestrations set between nearly solid, slightly projecting pavilions at the ends. The building's two main entrances, identical to each other, are located in the end pavilions on the west elevation. Oversized carved stone surrounds with modified egg-and-dart motifs contain pairs of replacement aluminum entrance doors set into bronze frames which include ornate transom windows. Above the entrance doors are glazed transoms with bronze grilles. The portions of the elevations between the end pavilions consist of Doric pilasters separating vertical groups of windows. The vertical window bands consist of replacement aluminum triple casement sash with trisected transoms set in the original bronze frames. To create the vertical banding effect, bronze spandrels with varying designs (grains, flowers, abstracts) were placed at the floor levels. The spandrels over the entrance doorways feature a spread eagle motif. A cornice, composed of a modified Doric order entablature with guttae details sits atop the two-story pilasters and contains the incised letters "UNITED STATES OF AMERICA" on the west elevation. The third floor of the building sits back slightly from the west and north faces of the building, and are divided into twelve bays of fenestration with the same replacement aluminum triple casement sash with trisected transoms. A simplified cornice with abstract carvings top the elevation. Bronze letters reading "ROBERT A. GRANT FEDERAL BUILDING AND UNITED STATES COURTHOUSE" are attached to the limestone adjacent to each entrance. The building's cornerstone with incised lettering is adjacent to the north entrance.

The details and materials of the end pavilion wrap around to the east and south elevations. The remainder of these elevations, though clad with the same granite and matching limestone, are much simpler in appearance and are devoid of the decorative carved details. Window openings contain either single or paired casement sash with corresponding transoms. Several door and window openings have been infilled with metal louvers of limestone blocks. The main feature of the east elevation is the raised loading dock platform with its projecting canopy. An overhead garage door, also located on the east elevation, provides access to the basement parking court.

The building features two highly significant interior spaces: a two-story, barrel-vaulted postal lobby trimmed in marble and polished brass on the first floor, and a two-story courtroom trimmed with walnut paneling on the third floor. Most of the remainder of the interior spaces have been substantially renovated over the years.

=== Construction history and space inventory ===
Square Footage		Building Dimensions	
Floor Area Total:	137034	Stories/Levels:	5
First Floor Area:	0	Perimeter:	0(Linear Ft.)
Occupiable Area:	65629	Depth:	0(Linear Ft.)
		Height:	75(Linear Ft.)
		Length:	0(Linear Ft.)

=== Construction history ===
Year Start	Year End	Description	Architect
1932	1933	Original Construction	Austin & Shambleau

=== Significance ===
During the first quarter of the 20th Century, South Bend, Indiana's businesses and population were increasing at an unexpectedly rapid rate and the 1898 U.S. Post Office, though extensively remodeled in 1909, could not keep up. In April 1930, President Herbert Hoover transmitted an approved list of public building projects to Congress including $1,000,000 to construct a new post office in South Bend, Indiana. At the end of June, 1930, the Second Deficiency Bill, calling for $66,211,884 in expenditures succeeded in acquiring the lot adjacent to the existing U.S. Post Office, increasing the site to an adequate size.

The United States Department of the Treasury, Office of the Supervising Architect was making an effort to award design work to local architects and contractors whenever possible. Several South Bend architectural firms submitted schematic designs to the Treasury Department. In December 1930, the design contract was awarded to the local architectural firm of Austin & Shambleau. Ennis R. Austin had worked for the Treasury Department as the Superintendent of Construction for six years prior to the establishment of the firm. In this position, he had supervised the construction of all post offices and federal court buildings in a three-state area. The government provided minimal guidelines, including the functions to be located in the building, allowing the architect a free hand on the design. The general layout and design was developed by N. Roy Shambleau.

The building style, sometimes referred to as "Starved Classicism," was just beginning to evolve. Prior to this era, most federal buildings were Neoclassical in design. However, the Modernist movement was gaining strength in federal architecture with ideas of more universal spaces, the flat facade, and the lack of ornamentation. This resulted in a block-form building with fluted pilasters alternating with shallow windows creating virtually flat facades. The internal space often became more open, flexible and interchangeable. The ornamentation - a symbolic classical motif - became more abstract and pared-down.

The construction documents were completed by the end of June, 1931. The documents were sent out for bid during July and three bids were received. The low bidder was James I. Barnes and Company of Logansport, Indiana with a bid of $685,000. The contract was awarded in the middle of August and the Notice to Proceed was issued the beginning of September 1931. Demolition of the existing building began in September 1931 and was completed by the end of October. The excavation was begun that fall, but the foundations were not poured until the spring of 1932. By April, the granite base was in place and the brick work had begun. The corner was laid by Postmaster John N. Hunter on May 12, 1932. The new U.S. Post Office and Courthouse was ready for occupancy the first week in March 1933, a week before completion was scheduled.

The building served its original purpose for fifty years. Then in 1983, the U.S. Postal Service moved from the building into a new facility. An extensive renovation project ensued, converting the former postal service area for use by the federal courts and offices. An additional District Court expansion project is scheduled for 1997.

On July 12, 1985, the building was listed in the National Register of Historic Places as part of the Downtown South Bend Historic Multiple Resources Area. The building was cited as having significance in the area of architecture and government/politics. On October 23, 1992, the building was renamed for Judge Robert A. Grant.

It was listed on the National Register of Historic Places in 2015.
