= James Rodger Fleming =

American historian

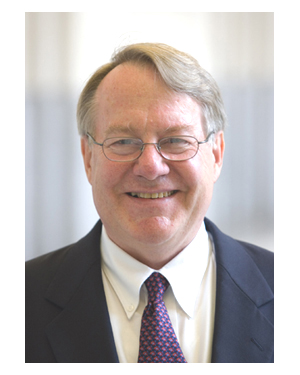
James Rodger Fleming, historian of science, at Woodrow Wilson International Center for Scholars, 2006

James Rodger Fleming, is a historian of science and technology, and the Charles A. Dana Professor of Science, Technology, and Society, Emeritus at Colby College, and author of the book Fixing the Sky: The Checkered History of Weather and Climate Control.

== Life and career ==
Fleming earned degrees from Pennsylvania State University (BS astronomy 1971), Colorado State University (MS atmospheric science, 1973), and Princeton University (PhD history, 1988). He was a professor in the Science, Technology, and Society Program at Colby College for 33 years and retired in 2021. Fleming is a Fellow of the American Association for the Advancement of Science (AAAS), and a fellow of the American Meteorological Society (AMS). He is regarded as an expert for climate engineering, and critical of technological fixes to address global warming.

== Awards and honors ==
Charles A. Lindbergh Chair in Aerospace History and the AAAS Roger Revelle Fellowship in Global Stewardship during his time as a public policy scholar at the Woodrow Wilson International Center for Scholars.

- Sally Hacker Prize

== Bibliography ==
Sourced per his homepage at Colby College.

- Meteorology in America, 1800-1870 (Johns Hopkins, 1990)
- Historical Perspectives on Climate Change (Oxford, 1998)
- The Callendar Effect (AMS, 2007)
- Fixing the Sky (Columbia, 2010)
- Inventing Atmospheric Science (MIT, 2016)
- FIRST WOMAN: Joanne Simpson and the Tropical Atmosphere (Oxford, 2020)

== Publications ==
- The Climate Engineers (2007)
- Fixing the Sky: The Checkered History of Climate Engineering (2012)
- Meteorology: Weather makers (2017)
