= David A. Capp =

American lawyer (born 1950)

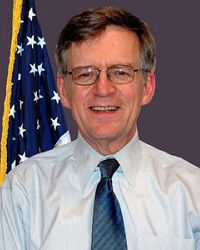

United States Attorney for the Northern District of Indiana
- In office July 20, 2007 – March 10, 2017; Acting: July 20, 2007 – April 28, 2010
- President: George W. Bush; Barack Obama; Donald Trump
- Preceded by: Joseph S. Van Bokkelen
- Succeeded by: Thomas Kirsch

Personal details
- Born: January 18, 1950 (age 76)
- Party: Democratic
- Education: University of Wisconsin; Valparaiso University

David A. Capp (born January 18, 1950) is an American attorney who served as the United States Attorney for the Northern District of Indiana from 2007 to 2017.

Capp resigned his post shortly before his retirement "as requested by the President."

== See also ==
- 2017 dismissal of U.S. attorneys
