= Barnes & Thornburg =

American law firm

Barnes & Thornburg LLP
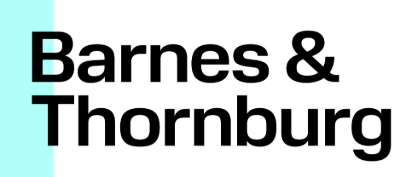
- Headquarters: Indianapolis, Indiana, US
- No. of offices: 26
- No. of attorneys: 850
- No. of employees: 1,700
- Major practice areas: Full service law, lobbying
- Key people: Andrew Detherage, firm managing partner
- Date founded: 1982
- Company type: Limited liability partnership
- Website: btlaw.com

Barnes & Thornburg LLP is a U.S. law firm and lobbying group with 26 offices located in the United States. It is the largest law firm in Indiana and ranks 78th among the largest law firms in the U.S.

== History ==
The firm was founded in 1982 as a merger of two Indiana-based firms: the Indianapolis-based Barnes, Hickam, Pantzer & Boyd (founded in 1940), and the South Bend-based Thornburg, McGill, Deahl, Harman, Carey & Murray (founded in 1926). Since 2009, Barnes & Thornburg has opened offices in Boston, Dallas, Detroit, Los Angeles, New York, Raleigh, San Diego, Salt Lake, Atlanta, Minneapolis, Columbus. In 2015, the National Law Journal ranked Barnes & Thornburg as the 78th largest law firm in the United States. In 2015, the American Lawyer released its AmLaw 100 rankings, and Barnes & Thornburg was listed at No. 90. In April 2019, a ground-breaking ceremony took place for the firm's new office building in South Bend, Indiana. The 5-story mixed-use building designed by KTGY Architecture is called The Barnes and Thornburg building and consists of 32,839 square feet of office space and 6,720 square feet of retail and restaurant space on the ground floor. It was the first commercial development to break ground in the downtown business district in the past 20 years. The firm remained in the 1st Source Bank Center until summer 2021, when the South Bend branch relocated to their aforementioned current office at 201 S. Main Street.

=== 2020 election fraud controversy ===
On June 3, 2021, an attorney at Barnes & Thornburg filed a lawsuit in the United States District Court for the District of Minnesota on behalf of Michael Lindell, the CEO of My Pillow, in which the firm alleged that the 2020 election was fraudulent due to the hacking of voting machines. The firm specifically alleged that there is evidence "showing voting machines were manipulated to affect outcomes in the November 2020 general election," despite claims that the 2020 Election was stolen from President Trump being widely discredited. In the complaint, Barnes & Thornburg claimed that the phrase "the Big Lie," which Dominion referred to in its own lawsuit against Mike Lindell in the United States District Court for the District of Columbia, was a term coined by Adolf Hitler in Mein Kampf. On June 4, 2021, Barnes & Thornburg announced that the partner who had signed onto the lawsuit had avoided internal authorization procedures and was no longer with the firm, and that it would be withdrawing as counsel on the suit.

== Practice areas ==
Barnes & Thornburg has practice areas in healthcare law, environmental law, and construction law, intellectual property, international trade law, white collar criminal defense, government relations and some niche specialties such as aviation law. By expanding through mergers, they have acquired practice groups from other firms in the fields of labor and employment, intellectual property, and estate planning.
