= John Showalter =

John Showalter may refer to:

- John William Showalter (1844–1898), United States federal judge
- John Showalter (director), American television director
