= Fred Paul Grosscup =

Fred Paul Grosscup (1854–1925) was a businessman, land developer, and politician who lived in Charleston, West Virginia. He was in the farm implement business, developed a waterworks in Texas, and got into the natural gas and railroad industries. He was also a property developer. He advocated for funding a geological department in West Virginia. A Republican, he campaigned to be governor in the 1920 election. In 1905 he was hospitalized for ptomaine poisoning.

He was born in Ashland County, Ohio, the son of Benjamin and Susan Bowermeister Grosscup. Benjamin S. Grosscup, a lawyer in Tacoma, Washington, and Judge Peter S. Grosscup were his brothers.

He married Bertha Maria Coffey of Wooster, Ohio in 1882. He was named on the patents for hay carriers.

From 1905 to 1907 he was Speaker of the West Virginia House of Delegates.

He served on the Panama-Pacific Exposition Commission organizing West Virginia's involvement in the event to held in San Francisco, California. In 1919 he served as president of the West Virginia Natural Gas Association.

He died in Chicago.

There is a Grosscup Road. His son, Paul Benjamin Grosscup, owned the Grosscup-Meters Realty Company that developed what is now the Grosscup Historic District.
