= William Morris Sparks =

American judge (1872–1950)

Senior Judge of the United States Court of Appeals for the Seventh Circuit
- In office November 13, 1948 – January 7, 1950

Chief Judge of the United States Court of Appeals for the Seventh Circuit
- In office 1948
- Preceded by: Office established
- Succeeded by: James Earl Major

Judge of the United States Court of Appeals for the Seventh Circuit
- In office October 31, 1929 – November 13, 1948
- Appointed by: Herbert Hoover
- Preceded by: Albert B. Anderson
- Succeeded by: Philip J. Finnegan

Personal details
- Born: William Morris Sparks; April 28, 1872 Charlottesville, Indiana, U.S.
- Died: January 7, 1950 (aged 77) Rushville, Indiana, U.S.
- Education: DePauw University (AB); Indiana Law School read law

William Morris Sparks (April 28, 1872 – January 7, 1950) was a United States circuit judge of the United States Court of Appeals for the Seventh Circuit.

== Education and career ==
Born in Charlottesville, Indiana, Sparks received an Artium Baccalaureus degree from DePauw University in 1896, attended Indiana Law School (now Indiana University Robert H. McKinney School of Law), and read law to enter the Bar in 1896. He was a deputy prosecuting attorney of Rush County, Indiana from 1896 to 1898, then entered private practice in Rushville, Indiana from 1897 to 1901. He was a member of the Indiana House of Representatives from 1901 to 1903. He was a Judge of the 16th Judicial Circuit Court of Indiana from 1904 to 1910, returning to private practice in Rushville from 1910 to 1914, and again assuming his Circuit Court judgeship from 1914 to 1929.

== Federal judicial service ==
On October 25, 1929, Sparks was nominated by President Herbert Hoover to a seat on the United States Court of Appeals for the Seventh Circuit vacated by Judge Albert B. Anderson. Sparks was confirmed by the United States Senate on October 31, 1929, and received his commission the same day. He served as Chief Judge and as a member of the Judicial Conference of the United States in 1948, assuming senior status on November 13, 1948. Sparks served in that capacity until his death on January 7, 1950, in Rushville.

== Sources ==
Legal offices
Preceded by Albert B. Anderson	Judge of the United States Court of Appeals for the Seventh Circuit; 1929–1948	Succeeded by Philip J. Finnegan
Preceded by Office established	Chief Judge of the United States Court of Appeals for the Seventh Circuit; 1948	Succeeded by James Earl Major
