= Joe Zakas =

American politician

Joseph C. Zakas
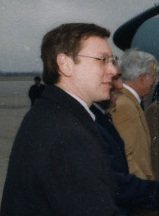
- Zakas in 1988

Member of the Indiana Senate from the 11th district
- In office November 3, 1982 – November 7, 2018
- Preceded by: Daniel Anthony Manion
- Succeeded by: Linda Rogers

Personal details
- Born: November 7, 1950 (age 75) Chicago, Illinois, U.S.
- Party: Republican
- Spouse: Anne
- Children: 4
- Education: University of Illinois (BA); University of Notre Dame (JD, MBA)

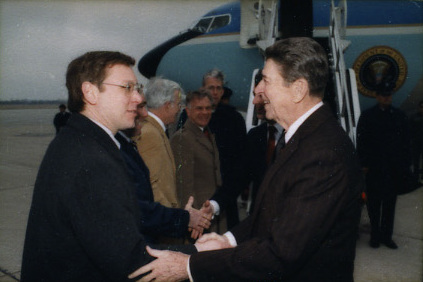
Zakas with President Ronald Reagan in 1988

Joseph C. Zakas (born November 7, 1950) is an American attorney and politician who served as a Republican member of the Indiana Senate for the 11th district from 1982 to 2018.

== Early life and education ==
Zakas was born in Chicago. He earned a Bachelor of Arts degree from the University of Illinois Urbana-Champaign in 1972 and a dual JD–MBA from the Notre Dame Law School.

== Career ==
Zakas worked as an attorney for Thorne Grodnik LLP in Elkhart, Indiana. He was first elected to the Indiana Senate in 1982, succeeding Dan Manion. He was the Republican nominee for Indiana's 3rd congressional district in 1996, losing in the general election by Democrat Tim Roemer. Zakas lost renomination to the State Senate in 2018.
