= Wilbur Frank Pell Jr. =

American judge (1915–2000)

Wilbur Pell

Senior Judge of the United States Court of Appeals for the Seventh Circuit
- In office July 31, 1984 – September 25, 2000

Judge of the United States Court of Appeals for the Seventh Circuit
- In office April 24, 1970 – July 31, 1984
- Appointed by: Richard Nixon
- Preceded by: John Simpson Hastings
- Succeeded by: Daniel Anthony Manion

Personal details
- Born: Wilbur Frank Pell Jr. December 6, 1915 Shelbyville, Indiana, U.S.
- Died: September 25, 2000 (aged 84) Evanston, Illinois, U.S.
- Education: Indiana University Bloomington (AB); Harvard University (JD)

Wilbur Frank Pell Jr. (December 6, 1915 – September 25, 2000) was a United States circuit judge of the United States Court of Appeals for the Seventh Circuit.

== Education and career ==
Born in Shelbyville, Indiana, Pell received an Artium Baccalaureus degree from Indiana University Bloomington in 1937 and a Juris Doctor from Harvard Law School in 1940. He was in private practice in Shelbyville from 1940 to 1942. He was a special agent of the Federal Bureau of Investigation in Philadelphia, Pennsylvania and Birmingham, Alabama from 1942 to 1945, returning to private practice in Shelbyville from 1946 to 1970. He was a deputy state attorney general of Indiana from 1952 to 1955.

== Federal judicial service ==
On January 23, 1970, Pell was nominated by President Richard Nixon to a seat on the United States Court of Appeals for the Seventh Circuit vacated by Judge John Simpson Hastings. Pell was confirmed by the United States Senate on April 23, 1970, and received his commission on April 24, 1970. He assumed senior status on July 31, 1984, and served in that capacity until his death on September 25, 2000, in Evanston, Illinois.

== Sources ==
Legal offices
Preceded by John Simpson Hastings	Judge of the United States Court of Appeals for the Seventh Circuit; 1970–1984	Succeeded by Daniel Anthony Manion
