= Peter S. Grosscup =

American judge (1852-1921)

Peter Stenger Grosscup
- Judge Peter S. Grosscup as he appeared at the time of the 1894 Pullman Strike

Judge of the United States Court of Appeals for the Seventh Circuit
- In office January 23, 1899 – October 23, 1911
- Appointed by: William McKinley
- Preceded by: John William Showalter
- Succeeded by: Samuel Alschuler

Judge of the United States Circuit Courts for the Seventh Circuit
- In office January 23, 1899 – October 23, 1911
- Appointed by: William McKinley
- Preceded by: John William Showalter
- Succeeded by: Seat abolished

Judge of the United States District Court for the Northern District of Illinois
- In office December 20, 1892 – February 1, 1899
- Appointed by: Benjamin Harrison
- Preceded by: Henry Williams Blodgett
- Succeeded by: Christian Cecil Kohlsaat

Personal details
- Born: Peter Stenger Grosscup; February 15, 1852 Ashland, Ohio
- Died: October 1, 1921 (aged 69) at sea
- Education: Wittenberg College (AB); Boston University School of Law (LLB)

Peter Stenger Grosscup (February 15, 1852 – October 1, 1921) was a United States circuit judge of the United States Court of Appeals for the Seventh Circuit and the United States Circuit Courts for the Seventh Circuit and previously was a United States district judge of the United States District Court for the Northern District of Illinois. Grosscup is best remembered for having made use of the judicial injunction against strikers in labor disputes, including most notably the leadership of the American Railway Union in the 1894 Pullman Strike.

== Education and career ==
Born on February 15, 1852, in Ashland, Ohio, Grosscup received an Artium Baccalaureus degree in 1872 from Wittenberg College and received a Bachelor of Laws in 1873 from Boston University School of Law. He entered private practice in Ashland from 1873 to 1875. He was city solicitor for Ashland from 1875 to 1881. He resumed private practice in Ashland from 1881 to 1883. He continued private practice in Chicago, Illinois, from 1883 to 1892.

== Federal judicial service ==
Judge Peter Grosscup as he appeared late in his judicial career

Grosscup was nominated by President Benjamin Harrison on December 12, 1892, to a seat on the United States District Court for the Northern District of Illinois vacated by Judge Henry Williams Blodgett. He was confirmed by the United States Senate on December 20, 1892, and received his commission the same day. His service terminated on February 1, 1899, due to his elevation to the Seventh Circuit.

Grosscup was nominated by President William McKinley on January 18, 1899, to a joint seat on the United States Court of Appeals for the Seventh Circuit and the United States Circuit Courts for the Seventh Circuit vacated by Judge John William Showalter. He was confirmed by the Senate on January 23, 1899, and received his commission the same day. His service terminated on October 23, 1911, due to his resignation.

=== Allegation regarding district court appointment ===
According to Almont Lindsey's 1942 book The Pullman Strike, Grosscup received his district court appointment as political payback for a large donation George Pullman made to the Harrison presidential campaign.

=== Notable case ===
According to Almont Lindsey, federal judges Peter Grosscup and William Woods issued the first omnibus injunction against the Pullman railroad strikers in Chicago protecting 22 railroads on July 2, 1894. This innovative use of a federal injunction charged unnamed strikers with conspiracy for interfering with interstate commerce and the mails thus putting the federal courts at the disposal of corporations to break strikes. The July 3, 1894 New York Times called the injunction a "Gatling gun on paper."

== Death ==
Grosscup died on October 1, 1921, on board a ship bound for Southampton, England.

== Sources ==
Legal offices
| Preceded by Henry Williams Blodgett | Judge of the United States District Court for the Northern District of Illinois; 1892–1899 | Succeeded by Christian Cecil Kohlsaat |
| Preceded by John William Showalter | Judge of the United States Circuit Courts for the Seventh Circuit; 1899–1911 | Succeeded by Seat abolished |
| Preceded by John William Showalter | Judge of the United States Court of Appeals for the Seventh Circuit; 1899–1911 | Succeeded by Samuel Alschuler |
