= Hardress Nathaniel Swaim =

American judge (1890–1957)

Judge of the United States Court of Appeals for the Seventh Circuit
- In office October 21, 1949 – July 30, 1957
- Appointed by: Harry S. Truman
- Preceded by: Seat established by 63 Stat. 493
- Succeeded by: William Lynn Parkinson

Justice of the Indiana Supreme Court
- In office January 1, 1939 – January 1, 1945
- Preceded by: James P. Hughes
- Succeeded by: Howard Young Sr.

Personal details
- Born: Hardress Nathaniel Swaim; November 30, 1890 Zionsville, Indiana
- Died: July 30, 1957 (aged 66)
- Resting place: Crown Hill Cemetery and Arboretum, Section 212, Lot 196; 39.826519°N 86.174697°W
- Education: DePauw University (AB); University of Chicago Law School (JD)

Hardress Nathaniel Swaim (November 30, 1890 – July 30, 1957) was a justice of the Indiana Supreme Court and later a United States circuit judge of the United States Court of Appeals for the Seventh Circuit.

== Education and career ==
Born in Zionsville, Indiana, Swaim received an Artium Baccalaureus degree from DePauw University in 1913 and a J.D. degree from the University of Chicago Law School in 1916. He was in private practice in Indianapolis, Indiana from 1916 to 1939, interrupted by service in the United States Army as a First Lieutenant from 1917 to 1918. He was Comptroller of the City of Indianapolis from 1936 to 1947. He was a justice of the Indiana Supreme Court from January 1, 1939, to January 1, 1945, thereafter returning to private practice in Indianapolis from 1945 to 1949.

== Federal judicial service ==
Swaim received a recess appointment from President Harry S. Truman on October 21, 1949, to the United States Court of Appeals for the Seventh Circuit, to a new seat authorized by 63 Stat. 493. He was nominated to the same position by President Truman on January 5, 1950. He was confirmed by the United States Senate on February 8, 1950, and received his commission on February 10, 1950. His service terminated on July 30, 1957, due to his death.

== Sources ==
Legal offices
Preceded by James P. Hughes	Justice of the Indiana Supreme Court; 1939–1945	Succeeded by Howard Young Sr.
Preceded by Seat established by 63 Stat. 493	Judge of the United States Court of Appeals for the Seventh Circuit; 1949–1957	Succeeded by William Lynn Parkinson
