= Bering Sea Arbitration =

1893 Fishery dispute between the US and UK

The Bering Sea Arbitration of 1893 arose out of a fishery dispute between the United Kingdom of Great Britain and Ireland and the United States in the 1880s and the 1890s. One of the main points of contention was overhunting of fur seals and their possible extinction. The United States Revenue Cutter Service, today known as the United States Coast Guard, captured several Canadian sealer vessels throughout the conflict. Diplomatic representations followed the capture of the first three ships and an order for release was issued by the British imperial government (then still in charge of foreign affairs for Canada), but it did nothing to stop the seizures and none were released. This led to the U.S. claiming exclusive jurisdiction over the sealing industry in the Bering Sea, and that led to negotiations outside of the courts. The award was given in favor of the British, however, and the Americans were denied exclusive jurisdiction. The British were awarded compensation for the damage that had been inflicted on their vessels, and the American sealing zone remained as it was prior to the conflict (60 miles (97 km)).

== Origins ==
In 1867 the United States government purchased from Russia all her territorial rights in Alaska and the adjacent islands. The boundary between the two countries was a line drawn from the middle of the Bering Strait south-west to a point midway between the Aleutian and Komandorski Islands dividing the Bering Sea into two parts, the larger being on the American side. This portion included the Pribilof Islands, the principal breeding-grounds of the seals in those seas.

By Acts of Congress, passed between 1868 and 1873, the killing of seals was prohibited on the Pribilof Islands and in "the waters adjacent thereto" except upon certain specified conditions. This created a large swathe of friction between the executive and legislative branches of the U.S. government with the presidential veto employed by Ulysses S. Grant on two notable occasions. No definition of the meaning of the words "waters adjacent" was given in the act. In 1870 the exclusive rights of killing seals on these islands was leased by the United States to the Alaska Commercial Company, on conditions limiting the numbers to be taken annually, and otherwise providing for their protection. As early as 1872, the operations of foreign sealers attracted the attention of the United States' government, but any precautions then taken seem to have been directed against the capture of seals on their way through the passages between the Aleutian Islands, and no claim to jurisdiction beyond the 3-mile (4.8 km) limit appears to have been made. On March 12, 1881, the acting United States Secretary of the Treasury, in answer to a letter asking for an interpretation of the words "waters adjacent thereto" in the acts of 1868 and 1873, stated that all the waters east of the boundary line were considered to be within the waters of Alaska territory. In March 1886 this letter was communicated to the San Francisco customs by Daniel Manning, U.S. Secretary of the Treasury, for publication.

Beginning in about 1886, it became the practice of certain Canadian vessels to intercept passing seals in the open ocean (over 3 miles (4.8 km) from any shore) and shoot them in the water (pelagic sealing), often killing both male and female. The great drawback of pelagic sealing lies in the fact that nursing seal mothers wander far in search of food, while the males do not take food during the breeding season, but remain on the islands. Consequently, practically all the seals taken by pelagic sealers are nursing females, the death of which ordinarily results in the starvation of the pups. As a result of this practice, the real possibility of the destruction of the seal fisheries became apparent, together with industries valuable to both the United States and Great Britain.

== British involvement and escalation ==
In the summer of 1886, three British Columbian sealers, Carolena, Onward, and Thornton, were captured by an American revenue cutter, Corwin, 60 miles (97 km) from land. They were condemned by the district judge because they had been sealing within the limits of Alaska territory and owed a pro tanto obligation to respect the sovereign laws of the District of Alaska. Diplomatic representations followed and an order for release was issued but, in 1887, further captures were made which were judicially supported on the same grounds. From that point the United States claimed exclusive jurisdiction over the sealing industry in the Bering Sea; it also contended that the protection of the fur seal was an international duty, and should be secured by international arrangement. The British imperial government (then still in charge of foreign affairs for Canada) repudiated the claim, but was willing to negotiate on the question of international regulation.

== Negotiations ==
Between 1887 and 1890, negotiations were carried out among Russia, Great Britain and the United States with a view to a joint convention but the parties were unable to agree on basis for regulating sealing in the open seas, the pelagic zone. America had seal nurseries on the Pribilof Islands and Russia on the Komandorski group. Neither Britain, nor Canada, had land access to the Bering Sea or seal breeding grounds. Thus, to prohibit pelagic sealing would have been to exclude Britain from the industry.

The United States insisted that such prohibition was indispensable on the grounds that pelagic sealing involved the destruction of breeding stock, because it was practically impossible to distinguish between the male and female seal when in the water; and that it was unnecessarily wasteful, inasmuch as a large proportion of the seals so killed were lost. Britain contended that in all known cases the extermination of seals had been the result of operations upon land, and had never been caused exclusively by sealing in the pelagic zone.

The negotiations came to nothing, and the United States fell back upon their claim of right. In June 1890, it was reported that certain American revenue cutters had been ordered to proceed to the Bering Sea. Sir Julian Pauncefote, the British ambassador at Washington, having failed to obtain an assurance that British vessels would not be interfered with, laid a formal protest before the United States government.

== Arbitration ==
There followed a diplomatic controversy, in the course of which the United States developed the contentions which were afterwards laid before the tribunal of arbitration. The claim that Bering Sea was mare clausum was abandoned, but it was asserted that Russia had formerly exercised therein rights of exclusive jurisdiction which had passed to the United States, and they relied among other things upon the ukase of 1821, by which foreign vessels had been forbidden to approach within 100 Italian miles of the coasts of Russian America. It was pointed out by Great Britain that this ukase had been the subject of protest both by Great Britain and the United States, and that by treaties similar in their terms, made between Russia and each of the protesting powers, Russia had agreed that their subjects should not be troubled or molested in navigating or fishing in any part of the Pacific Ocean. The American answer was that the Pacific Ocean did not include the Bering Sea. They also claimed an interest in the fur seals, which were threatened with extinction, involving the right to protect them outside the 3-mile (4.8 km) limit. In August 1890 Lord Salisbury proposed that the question at issue should be submitted to arbitration. This was ultimately assented to by the secretary of state, James Gillespie Blaine, on the understanding that certain specific points, which he indicated, should be laid before the arbitrators.

On February 29, 1892, a definitive treaty was signed at Washington, D.C. Each power was to name two arbitrators, and the president of the French Republic, the king of Italy, the king of Sweden and Norway were each to name one.

=== Terms of reference and arbitrators ===
The points submitted were

1. What exclusive jurisdiction in the sea now known as Bering Sea, and what exclusive rights in the seal fisheries therein, did Russia assert and exercise prior to and up to the time of the cession of Alaska to the United States?
2. How far were her claims of jurisdiction as to the seal fisheries recognized and conceded by Great Britain?
3. Was the body of water now known as Bering Sea included in the phrase "Pacific Ocean", as used in the treaty of 1825 between Great Britain and Russia, and what rights, if any, in Bering Sea were held exclusively exercised by Russia after the said treaty?
4. Did not all the rights of Russia as to jurisdiction and as to the seal fisheries in Bering Sea east of the water boundary, in the treaty between the United States and Russia of the 30th of March 1867, pass unimpaired to the United States under that treaty?
5. Had the United States any and what right of protection over, or property in, the fur seals frequenting the islands of Bering Sea when such seals are found outside the three-mile limit?

In the event of a determination in favour of Great Britain the arbitrators were to determine what concurrent regulations were necessary for the preservation of the seals, and a joint commission was to be appointed by the two powers to assist them in the investigation of the facts of seal life. The question of damages was reserved for further discussion, but either party was to be at liberty to submit any question of fact to the arbitrators, and to ask for a finding thereon. The tribunal was to sit at Paris. The treaty was approved by the United States Senate on the March 29, 1892, and ratified by the president on April 22.

The United States appointed as arbitrator Mr. John M. Harlan, a justice of the Supreme Court, and Mr John T. Morgan, a member of the Senate. The British arbitrators were Lord Hannen and Sir John Sparrow David Thompson. The neutral arbitrators were the Baron de Courcel, the Marquis Visconti-Venosta, and Mr. Gregers Winther Wulfsberg Gram, appointed respectively by the President of the French Republic, the King of Italy, and the King of Sweden and Norway. The sittings of the tribunal began in February 1893 and ended in August. Henry Williams Blodgett acted as U.S. counsel before the tribunal.

=== Main arguments ===
When the evidence was before the tribunal, it was plain that the United States had a very weak case with regard to the claim of exclusive jurisdiction in the Bering Sea (the first claim), and it was not strongly pressed by the counsel of the United States. The real question, therefore, and the one upon which the chief argument was directed, was the second of the two claims put forward on behalf of the United States, the right of property in the seals and the right of protecting them beyond the 3-mile (4.8 km) limit.

It was suggested that the seals had some of the characteristics of the domestic animals, and could therefore be the subject of something in the nature of a right of property. They were so far amenable to human control that it was possible to take their increase without destroying the stock. Sealing upon land was legitimate sealing; the United States being the owners of the land, the industry was a trust vested in them for the benefit of mankind. On the other hand, pelagic sealing, being a method of promiscuous slaughter, was illegitimate; it was contra bonos mores and analogous to piracy. Consequently, the United States claimed a right to restrain such practices, both as proprietors of the seals and as proprietors and trustees of the legitimate industry.

Such a right to restrain was a novelty hitherto unrecognized by any system of law. James C. Carter, therefore, as counsel for the United States, submitted a theory of international jurisprudence which was equally novel. He argued that the determination of the tribunal must be grounded upon "the principles of right," that "by the rule or principle of right was meant a moral rule dictated by the general standard of justice upon which civilized nations are agreed, that this international standard of justice is but another name for international law, that the particular recognized rules were but cases of the application of a more general rule, and that where the particular rules were silent the general rule applied." The practical result of giving effect to this contention would be that an international tribunal could make new law and apply it retrospectively. Carter's contention was successfully combated by Charles Russell, the leading counsel for Great Britain.

=== Conclusion ===
The award, which was signed and published on 15 August 1893, was in favour of Great Britain on all points. The question of damages, which had been reserved, was ultimately settled by a mixed commission appointed by the two powers in February 1896, the total amount awarded to the British sealers being $473,151.26 - in excess of US$10 million in present-day inflation-adjusted dollars.

Since the decision was in favor of Great Britain, in accordance with the arbitration treaty the tribunal prescribed a series of regulations for preserving the seal herds which were to be binding upon and enforced by both powers. They limited pelagic sealing as to time, place, and manner by fixing a zone of 60 miles around the Pribilof Islands within which the seals were not to be molested at any time, and from May 1 to July 31 each year they were not to be pursued anywhere in Bering Sea. Only licensed sailing vessels were permitted to engage in fur sealing, and the use of firearms or explosives was prohibited. The regulations were to remain in force until abolished by mutual agreement, but were to be examined every five years with a view to modification.

These regulations, however, failed of their object, because the mother seals did not feed within the protected area, but far outside of it. The mother seals were therefore taken by the pelagic sealers as before, and their young were left to starve. The largest catch in the history of pelagic sealing, that of 1894, was made in the first season of the operation of these very regulations designed to so limit and restrict pelagic sealing as to protect and preserve the herd.

A joint commission of scientists from Great Britain and the United States further considered the problem, and came to the conclusion that the pelagic sealing needed to be curtailed. However further joint tribunals did not enact new legal restrictions, and then Japan also embarked upon pelagic sealing. Finally on July 7, 1911, the North Pacific Fur Seal Convention of 1911 severely curtailed the sealing industry. The treaty went into effect on December 15, 1911, and continued for fifteen years mandating that the Pribilof Islands become a sanctuary for seals.

== See also ==
- 1993 Cherbourg incident
- Cod Wars
- Turbot War
