= Philip J. Finnegan =

American judge (1886-1959)

Judge of the United States Court of Appeals for the Seventh Circuit
- In office May 5, 1949 – January 4, 1959
- Appointed by: Harry S. Truman
- Preceded by: William Morris Sparks
- Succeeded by: Latham Castle

Personal details
- Born: Philip J. Finnegan; June 25, 1886 Chicago, Illinois
- Died: January 4, 1959 (aged 72)
- Education: University of Chicago Law School (LLB)

Philip J. Finnegan (June 25, 1886 – January 4, 1959) was a United States circuit judge of the United States Court of Appeals for the Seventh Circuit.

== Education and career ==
Born in Chicago, Illinois, Finnegan received a J.D. from the University of Chicago Law School in 1913 and entered private practice in Chicago. He was a Judge of the Municipal Court of Chicago from 1922 to 1929, and of the Circuit Court of Cook County, Illinois from 1929 to 1949.

== Federal judicial service ==
Finnegan was nominated by President Harry S. Truman on April 8, 1949, to a seat on the United States Court of Appeals for the Seventh Circuit vacated by Judge William Morris Sparks. He was confirmed by the United States Senate on May 3, 1949, and received his commission on May 5, 1949. His service terminated on January 4, 1959, due to his death.

== Sources ==
Legal offices
Preceded by William Morris Sparks	Judge of the United States Court of Appeals for the Seventh Circuit; 1949–1959	Succeeded by Latham Castle
