= Howard Young Sr. =

American judge (1879–1961)

Howard Sloan Young Sr. (August 7, 1879 – October 14, 1961) was an American lawyer and judge who served as a justice of the Indiana Supreme Court from January 1, 1945, to January 1, 1951.

== Early life and legal career ==
Born in Indianapolis, Indiana, Young attended the University of Chicago, graduating in 1898, and received his law degree from the Indiana Law School in 1903. He was admitted to the Indiana bar that year and opened a solo practice in 1904. In 1916, he joined the law firm of Elam, Fesler, Elam & Young, remaining with the firm when it was reorganized as Fesler, Elam, Young & Fauvre in 1932.

Young served as a United States commissioner from 1920 to 1944. He was also president of the Indianapolis Bar Association from 1931 to 1932.

In November 1942, Young was elected to the Indianapolis Board of School Commissioners with the support of the Citizens School Committee, with his term scheduled to begin on January 1, 1945. Later biographical accounts also identify him as having served as a member of the Indianapolis School Board.

== Judicial service ==
In May 1944, a group of attorneys promoted Young as a candidate for the Republican nomination for the Indiana Supreme Court. Young said that he was inclined to enter the contest at the upcoming Republican state convention if there appeared to be a reasonable chance that he would be nominated. His prospective rivals for the nomination included Indiana Appellate Court judge Wilbur A. Royse and Marion County prosecutor Sherwood Blue.

Young received the Republican nomination and was elected to the Indiana Supreme Court later that year. He took office on January 1, 1945, succeeding H. Nathan Swaim, and served until January 1, 1951. Upon leaving the court, he returned to private practice in association with his son, Howard S. Young Jr.

== Personal life and death ==
Young and his wife had two daughters and a son. Their son was reported as serving in the United States Navy in 1944.

Young died in Indianapolis at the age of 82, following a two-month illness.

Political offices
Preceded by H. Nathan Swaim	Justice of the Indiana Supreme Court; 1945–1951	Succeeded by Arch Bobbitt
