= Albert B. Anderson =

American judge (1857–1938)

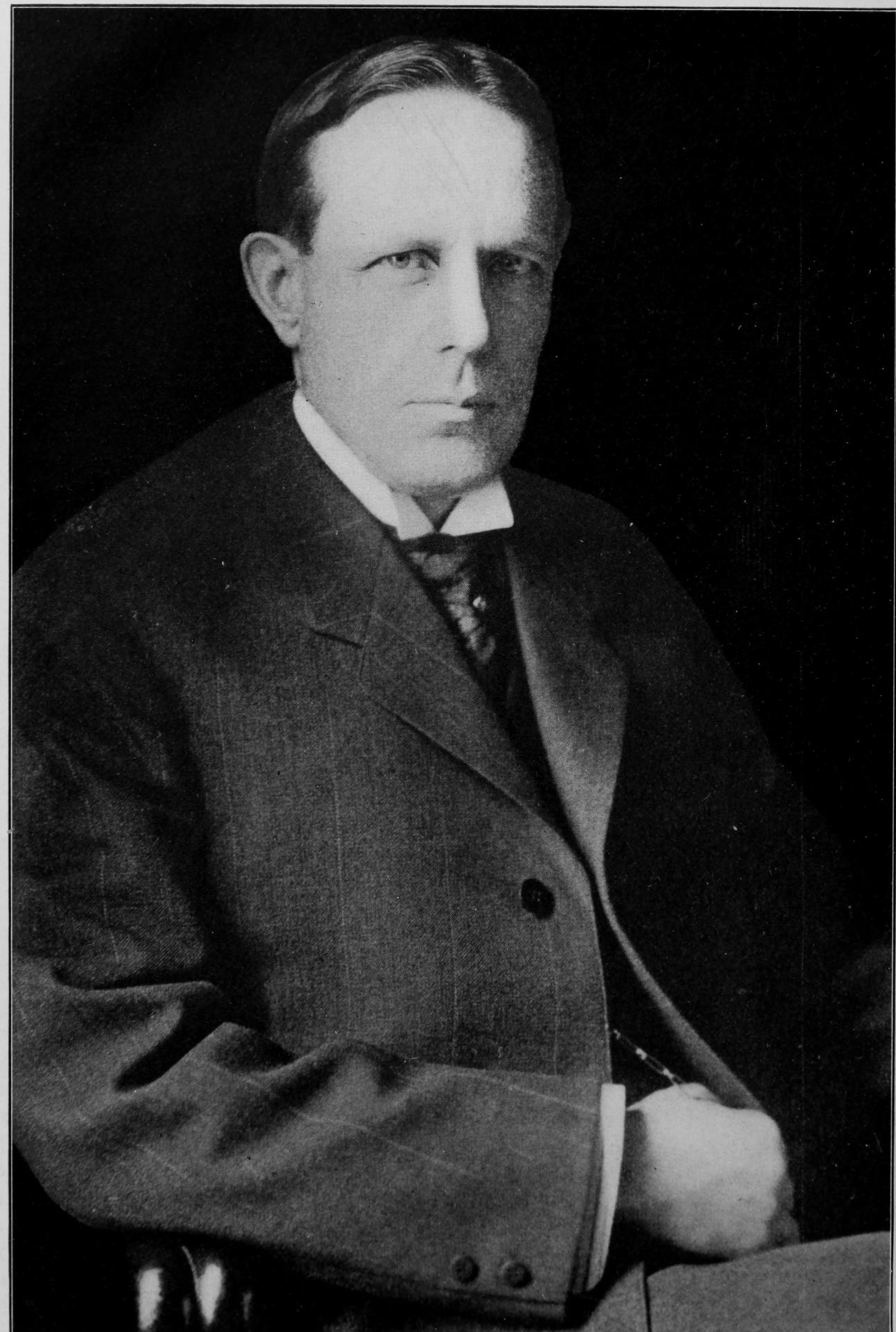

Senior Judge of the United States Court of Appeals for the Seventh Circuit
- In office October 30, 1929 – April 27, 1938

Judge of the United States Court of Appeals for the Seventh Circuit
- In office January 6, 1925 – October 30, 1929
- Appointed by: Calvin Coolidge
- Preceded by: Francis E. Baker
- Succeeded by: William Morris Sparks

Judge of the United States District Court for the District of Indiana
- In office December 8, 1902 – January 13, 1925
- Appointed by: Theodore Roosevelt
- Preceded by: John Baker
- Succeeded by: Robert C. Baltzell

Personal details
- Born: Albert Barnes Anderson; February 10, 1857 Zionsville, Indiana, U.S.
- Died: April 27, 1938 (aged 81) Indianapolis, Indiana, U.S.
- Resting place: Oak Hill Cemetery; Crawfordsville, Indiana, U.S.
- Education: Wabash College (AB) read law

Albert Barnes Anderson (February 10, 1857 – April 27, 1938), frequently known as A. B. Anderson, was a United States circuit judge of the United States Court of Appeals for the Seventh Circuit and previously was a United States district judge of the United States District Court for the District of Indiana.

== Education and career ==
Albert Barnes Anderson was born on February 10, 1857, in Zionsville, Indiana. His parents were Emma A. and Philander Anderson. Anderson received an Artium Baccalaureus degree from Wabash College in 1879 and read law in 1881. He earned his LLD in 1907. He was in private practice in Crawfordsville, Indiana from 1881 to 1902, and was prosecuting attorney of Montgomery County, Indiana from 1886 to 1890.

== Federal judicial service ==
Anderson was nominated by President Theodore Roosevelt on December 8, 1902, to a seat on the United States District Court for the District of Indiana vacated by Judge John Baker. He was confirmed by the United States Senate on December 8, 1902, and received his commission the same day. He held the position for 23 years, with his service being terminated on January 13, 1925, due to his elevation to the Seventh Circuit.

Anderson was nominated by President Calvin Coolidge on January 2, 1925, to a seat on the United States Court of Appeals for the Seventh Circuit vacated by Judge Francis E. Baker. He was confirmed by the Senate on January 6, 1925, and received his commission the same day. He assumed senior status on October 30, 1929, and retired that year.

Notable trials that Anderson oversaw included the loan scandal of Warren T. McCray and the United Mine Workers coal strike of 1919.

== Later life and death ==
Anderson died in Indianapolis on April 27, 1938. He is buried in Oak Hill Cemetery in Crawfordsville, Indiana.

=== Legacy ===
Anderson's correspondence is held in the collection of the Indiana State Library.

== Sources ==
Legal offices
Preceded by John Baker	Judge of the United States District Court for the District of Indiana; 1902–1925	Succeeded by Robert C. Baltzell
Preceded by Francis E. Baker	Judge of the United States Court of Appeals for the Seventh Circuit; 1925–1929	Succeeded by William Morris Sparks
