= Philip Willis Tone =

American judge (1923–2001)

Phil Tone

Judge of the United States Court of Appeals for the Seventh Circuit
- In office May 14, 1974 – April 30, 1980
- Appointed by: Richard Nixon
- Preceded by: Roger Kiley
- Succeeded by: Richard Posner

Judge of the United States District Court for the Northern District of Illinois
- In office January 26, 1972 – May 17, 1974
- Appointed by: Richard Nixon
- Preceded by: Seat established
- Succeeded by: Joel Flaum

Personal details
- Born: Philip Willis Tone; April 9, 1923 Chicago, Illinois, U.S.
- Died: November 28, 2001 (aged 78) Glenview, Illinois, U.S.
- Education: University of Iowa (AB, JD)

Philip Willis Tone (April 9, 1923 – November 28, 2001) was a United States circuit judge of the United States Court of Appeals for the Seventh Circuit and previously a judge of the United States District Court for the Northern District of Illinois.

== Education and career ==
Born in Chicago, Illinois, Tone received an Artium Baccalaureus degree from State University of Iowa (now the University of Iowa) in 1943 and was a First Lieutenant in the United States Army during World War II, from 1943 to 1946. He received a Juris Doctor from State University of Iowa College of Law in 1948. He was a law clerk to Supreme Court Justice Wiley B. Rutledge from 1948 to 1949. He was then in private practice in Washington, D.C. until 1950, and in Chicago until 1972.

== Career ==
On November 29, 1971, Tone was nominated by President Richard Nixon to a new seat on the United States District Court for the Northern District of Illinois created by 84 Stat. 294. He was confirmed by the United States Senate on December 2, 1971, and received his commission on January 26, 1972. His service terminated on May 17, 1974, due to elevation to the Seventh Circuit.

On April 22, 1974, Nixon nominated Tone to a seat on the United States Court of Appeals for the Seventh Circuit vacated by Judge Roger Kiley. Tone was confirmed by the Senate on May 6, 1974, and received his commission on May 14, 1974. Tone served in that capacity until his resignation from the bench, on April 30, 1980.

After his Judicial service, Tone returned to private practice in Chicago until his death, on November 28, 2001, in Glenview, Illinois.

== See also ==
- List of law clerks for the third seat of the Supreme Court of the United States

== Sources ==
Legal offices
New seat	Judge of the United States District Court for the Northern District of Illinois; 1972–1974	Succeeded by Joel Flaum
Preceded by Roger Kiley	Judge of the United States Court of Appeals for the Seventh Circuit; 1974–1980	Succeeded by Richard Posner
