= Daniel Anthony Manion =

American judge (1942–2024)

Daniel Manion
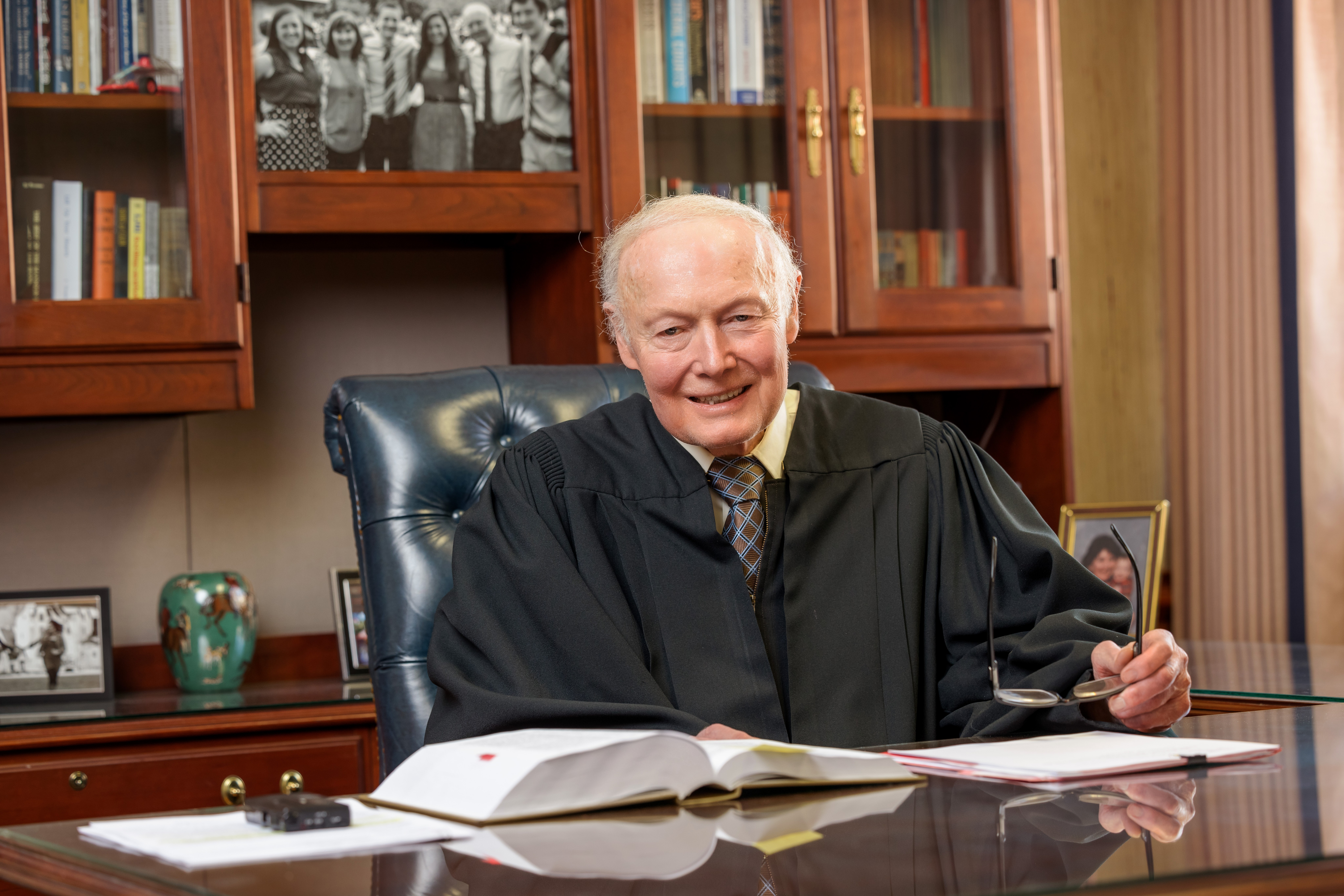
- Manion in 2020

Senior Judge of the United States Court of Appeals for the Seventh Circuit
- In office December 18, 2007 – August 31, 2024

Judge of the United States Court of Appeals for the Seventh Circuit
- In office July 24, 1986 – December 18, 2007
- Appointed by: Ronald Reagan
- Preceded by: Wilbur Frank Pell Jr.
- Succeeded by: John Daniel Tinder

Member of the Indiana Senate from the 11th district
- In office November 8, 1978 – November 3, 1982
- Preceded by: Robert L. Kovach
- Succeeded by: Joe Zakas

Personal details
- Born: February 1, 1942 South Bend, Indiana, U.S.
- Died: August 31, 2024 (aged 82) South Bend, Indiana, U.S.
- Party: Republican
- Spouse: Ann Murphy
- Relations: Clarence Manion (father)
- Children: 4
- Education: University of Notre Dame (AB); Indiana University, Indianapolis (JD)

Military service
- Allegiance: United States
- Branch/service: United States Army
- Years of service: 1965–1966
- Battles/wars: Vietnam War

Daniel Anthony Manion (February 1, 1942 – August 31, 2024) was an American lawyer, politician, and jurist who served as a United States circuit judge of the United States Court of Appeals for the Seventh Circuit. He also served in the Indiana Senate from 1978 to 1982.

== Early life and education ==
The elder son of Clarence and Virginia Manion, Daniel Manion received his Bachelor of Arts degree from the University of Notre Dame in 1964. His father, Clarence Manion (1896–1979), was dean of Notre Dame Law School and president of the Manion Forum, a conservative radio and television program. His mother, Virginia ("Gina") O'Brien Manion, was a well-known owner and trainer of Arabian horses.

At Notre Dame, Manion was a three-time champion in the Bengal Bouts, a boxing tournament begun by legendary football coach Knute Rockne. Following graduation, Manion served in the United States Army during the Vietnam War, when he was deployed.

== Career ==
He was appointed the director of industrial development for the Indiana Department of Commerce in 1968. While serving in this position, Manion attended night school at Indiana University Robert H. McKinney School of Law, receiving his Juris Doctor in 1973. After a brief stint in the state attorney general's office as a clerk and then a deputy state attorney general, Manion entered the private practice of law, where he remained until his confirmation as a federal judge. He also served as an Indiana state senator from 1978 to 1982.

=== Federal judicial service ===
On February 21, 1986, President Ronald Reagan nominated Manion to the United States Court of Appeals for the Seventh Circuit, to a seat vacated by Judge Wilbur Frank Pell Jr. In a radio address to the nation, President Reagan stated, "I know [Daniel Manion] to be a person who has the ability and determination to become the kind of judge the American people want in the federal courts; one who believes in the rule of law, who reveres the Constitution, and whose sense of fairness and justice is above reproach."

The ABA rated Manion "qualified/unqualified." Criticism of him as a nominee came for spelling and grammatical errors in legal briefs submitted to the Senate Judiciary Committee and for his support for the John Birch Society. He became the first of President Reagan's judicial nominees to fail to win support from the Judiciary Committee. The nomination was controversial; Manion was confirmed 48–46 on June 26, 1986, and reaffirmed 50–49 on July 23, 1986, with Vice President George Bush casting a tie-breaking vote. Manion received his commission on July 24, 1986. He assumed senior status on December 18, 2007. His service was terminated on August 31, 2024, due to his death.

==== Notable decisions ====
- Ernst v. City of Chicago, 837 F.3d 788 (7th Cir. 2016). (ruling in favor of female paramedics who brought Title VII gender-discrimination lawsuit against the City of Chicago)
- Friedman v. City of Highland Park, 784 F.3d 406 (7th Cir. 2015). (Manion, J., dissenting) (applying strict scrutiny to local ordinance prohibiting possession of semi-automatic rifles)
- Norton v. City of Springfield, 768 F.3d 713, 718 (7th Cir. 2014). (Manion, J., dissenting) (concluding that anti-panhandling ordinance prohibiting "immediate requests for monetary donations" was content-based and subject to strict scrutiny)
- Hayden v. Greensburg Community School Corp., 743 F.3d 569, 583 (7th Cir.). (Manion, J., concurring in part and dissenting in part) (concluding that Indiana high school boys basketball coach's short haircut policy did not violate the Equal Protection Clause)
- Planned Parenthood of Wisconsin v. Van Hollen, 738 F.3d 786, 799 (7th Cir. 2013). (Manion, J., concurring in part and in the judgment) (concluding that the rational basis standard of review applied in challenge to Wisconsin law requiring that abortion doctors possess admitting privileges at hospitals within 30 miles from where they perform abortions)
- Vance v. Rumsfeld, 653 F.3d 591, 627 (7th Cir. 2011). (Manion, J., concurring in part and dissenting in part) (disagreeing that Bivens remedy was available for alleged torture of detainees by American military personnel in war zone in the absence of Congressional authorization and expressing "serious reservations" about the majority's holding that Secretary Rumsfeld may be held personally liable for the alleged actions of his subordinates under the plaintiffs' allegation)
- Sherman ex. rel. Sherman v. Koch, 623 F.3d 501 (7th Cir. 2010). (upholding Illinois "moment of silence" law)
- Books & Suetkamp v. City of Elkhart, 235 F.3d 292, 311 (7th Cir. 2000). (Manion, J., concurring in part and dissenting in part) (disagreeing that application of Lemon test compelled removal of Ten Commandments from near City Hall)
- Planned Parenthood of Indiana and Kentucky v. Commissioner of the Indiana State Department of Health (Manion, J., dissenting); noted for its connection to a dissent on abortion and eugenics which Judge Amy Coney Barrett joined, and for Senator Patrick Leahy's question on the case to Barrett during her Supreme Court confirmation hearings in October, 2020.

==== Notable former law clerks ====
- Michael B. Brennan, circuit judge, United States Court of Appeals for the Seventh Circuit
- Stephen Dillard, chief judge, Court of Appeals of Georgia
- Len Munsil, former candidate for governor of Arizona and president of Arizona Christian University
- Joseph L. Toth, judge, United States Court of Appeals for Veterans Claims
- Patrick J. Urda, judge, United States Tax Court
- Tammy McCutchen, former administrator of the Wage and Hour Division

== Personal life and death ==
Manion was married to Ann Murphy Manion, a member of the second class of women to gain entrance to the University of Notre Dame, who graduated magna cum laude in 1977. The couple had four children.

Manion's younger brother, Christopher Manion (born 1946), was a member of the Foreign Relations Committee staff chosen by Senator Jesse Helms (R-NC) in the early 1980s. In 1986, one month after his brother's judicial confirmation, he was mentioned in an FBI investigation regarding a purported release of classified information to Chilean officials "about a covert American intelligence-gathering operation". Helms and Manion were exonerated after the investigation.

Before his Senate service, Christopher Manion earned his Ph.D. in government at Notre Dame University. He served as assistant to the director of Rockford College in Illinois. He later taught politics, religion, and international relations at Boston University, Catholic University of America, and Christendom College. He is a Knight of Malta.

In the 1990s, Christopher Manion was director of legislation at the American Council for Health Care Reform, which opposed President Clinton's health reform plans.

Daniel Manion died in South Bend on August 31, 2024, at the age of 82.

Indiana Senate
Preceded by Robert L. Kovach	Member of the Indiana Senate from the 11th district 1978–1982	Succeeded by Joe Zakas
Legal offices
Preceded by Wilbur Frank Pell, Jr.	Judge of the United States Court of Appeals for the Seventh Circuit; 1986–2007	Succeeded by John Daniel Tinder
