= Thomas Drummond (judge) =

American judge (1809–1890)

The Honorable Thomas Drummond
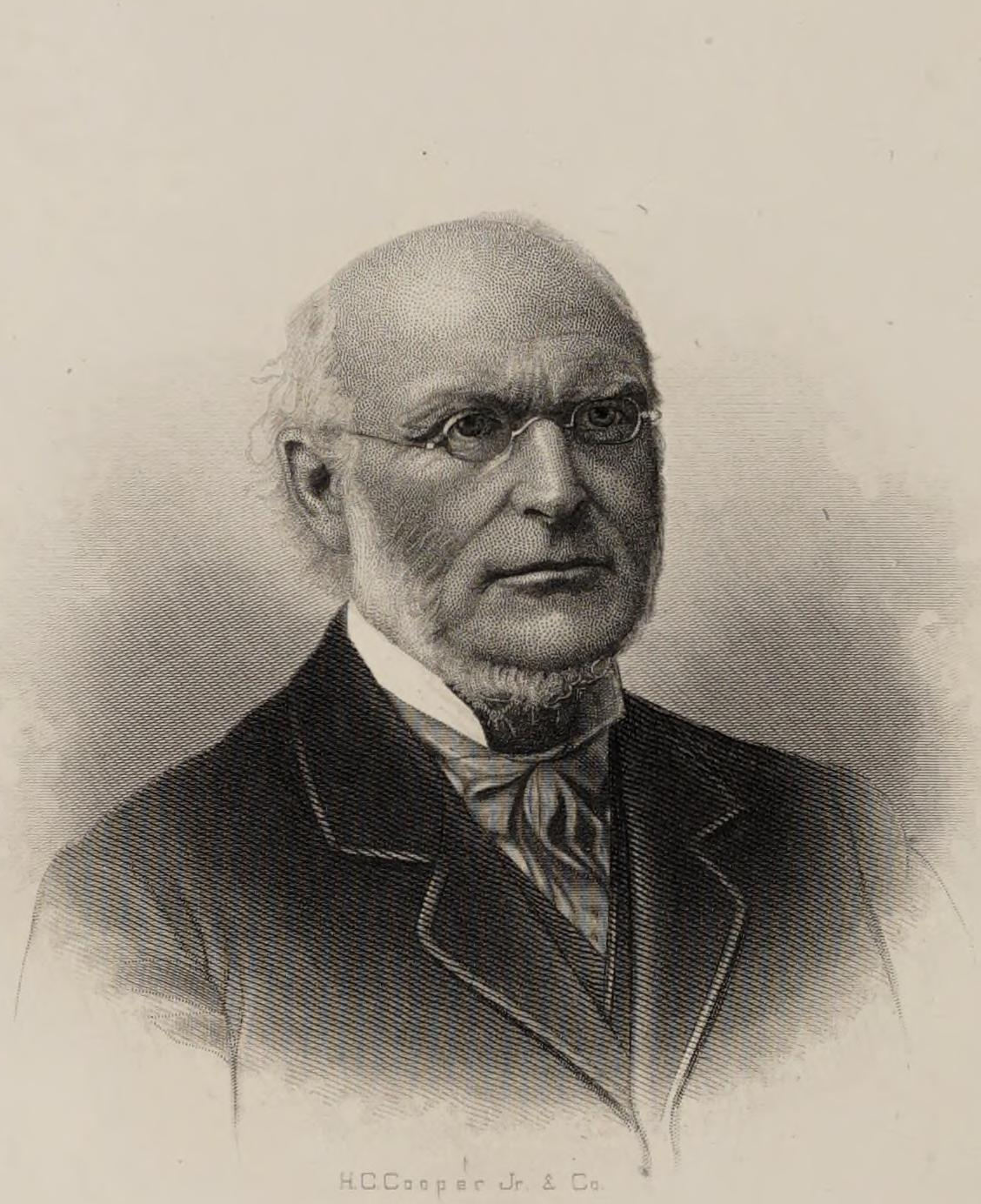

Judge of the United States Circuit Courts for the Seventh Circuit
- In office December 22, 1869 – July 18, 1884
- Appointed by: Ulysses S. Grant
- Preceded by: Seat established by 16 Stat. 44
- Succeeded by: Walter Q. Gresham

Judge of the United States District Court for the Northern District of Illinois
- In office February 13, 1855 – December 22, 1869
- Appointed by: operation of law
- Preceded by: Seat established by 10 Stat. 606
- Succeeded by: Henry Williams Blodgett

Judge of the United States District Court for the District of Illinois
- In office February 19, 1850 – February 13, 1855
- Appointed by: Zachary Taylor
- Preceded by: Nathaniel Pope
- Succeeded by: Seat abolished

Member of the Illinois House of Representatives
- In office 1840–1841

Personal details
- Born: Thomas Drummond; October 16, 1809 Bristol Mills, Maine, US
- Died: May 15, 1890 (aged 80) Wheaton, Illinois, US
- Resting place: Graceland Cemetery
- Education: Bowdoin College read law

Thomas Drummond (October 16, 1809 – May 15, 1890) was a United States circuit judge of the United States Circuit Courts for the Seventh Circuit and previously was a United States District Judge of the United States District Court for the District of Illinois and the United States District Court for the Northern District of Illinois.

== Education and career ==
Born on October 16, 1809, in Bristol Mills, Maine, Drummond graduated from Bowdoin College in 1830 and read law in 1833. He entered private practice in Galena, Illinois from 1835 to 1850. He was a member of the Illinois House of Representatives from 1840 to 1841. He was a Judge of the Illinois Circuit Court from circa 1841 to circa 1850.

== Federal judicial service ==
Drummond was nominated by President Zachary Taylor on January 31, 1850, to a seat on the United States District Court for the District of Illinois vacated by Judge Nathaniel Pope. He was confirmed by the United States Senate on February 19, 1850, and received his commission the same day. Drummond was reassigned by operation of law to the United States District Court for the Northern District of Illinois on February 13, 1855, to a new seat authorized by 10 Stat. 606. His service terminated on December 22, 1869, due to his elevation to the Seventh Circuit.

Drummond was known for his knowledge of admiralty law. A Republican who partook in pro-Union rallies in Chicago during the Civil War, he was considered a likely candidate for a U.S. Supreme Court seat following Abraham Lincoln's election as president; the seat ultimately went to Lincoln campaign manager David Davis, whom Drummond had served with on the northern Illinois circuit court.

Drummond was nominated by President Ulysses S. Grant on December 8, 1869, to a new seat on the United States Circuit Courts for the Seventh Circuit authorized by 16 Stat. 44. He was confirmed by the Senate on December 22, 1869, and received his commission the same day. His service terminated on July 18, 1884, due to his retirement. As a circuit judge, Drummond oversaw several railroads that went into a receivership following the Panic of 1873. Following the Chicago railroad strike of 1877, he ruled in favor of the railroads, ordered troops to enforce his ruling, and charged several strikers with contempt of court.

Drummond was the last federal judge in active service appointed by President Taylor: indeed, at the time of his elevation to the Seventh Circuit he was already the only surviving judge appointed by him.

== Death ==
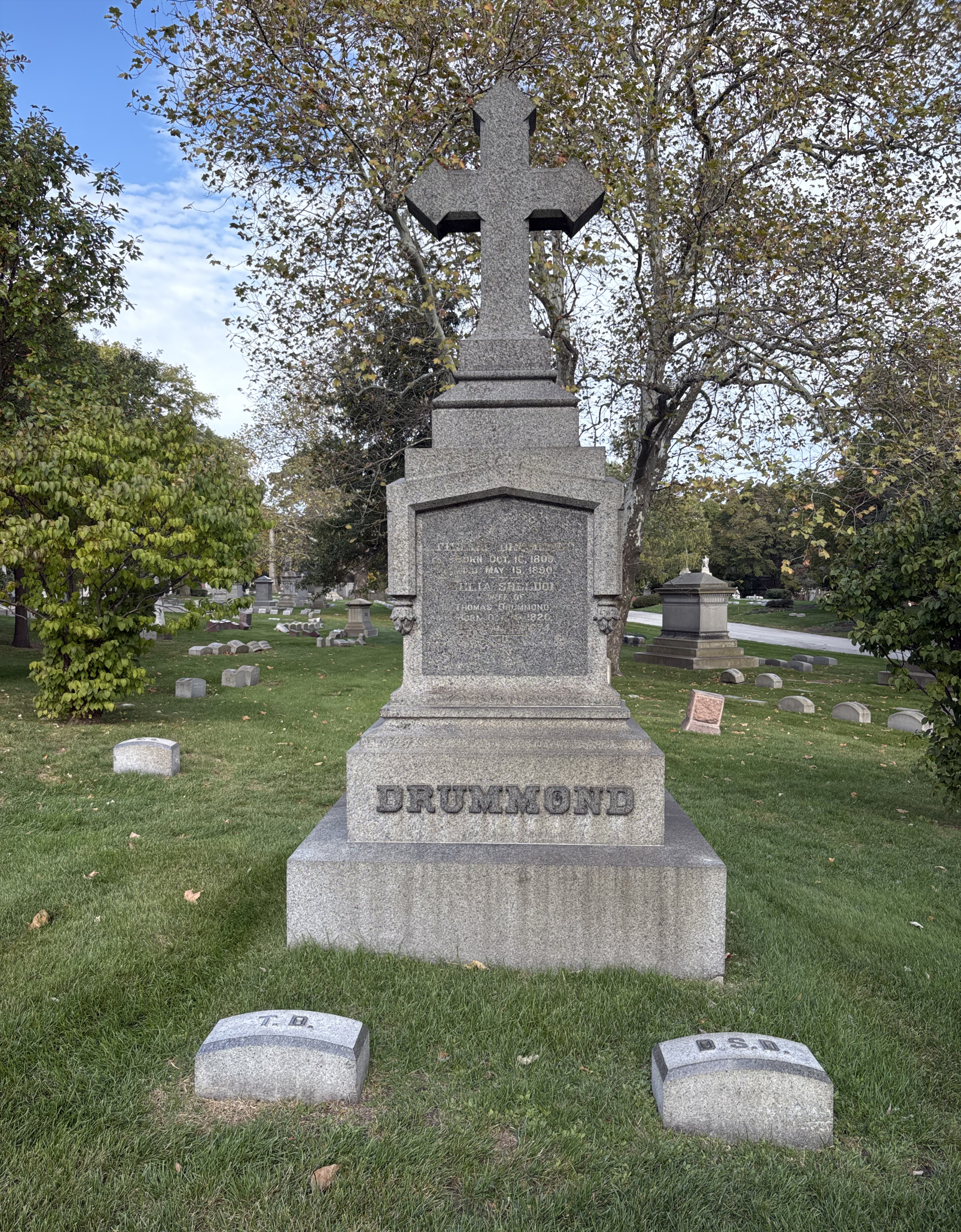
Drummond's grave at Graceland Cemetery

Drummond died on May 15, 1890, in Wheaton, Illinois. He was buried at Graceland Cemetery in Chicago.

== Sources ==
- Richard Cahan, A Court That Shaped America: Chicago's Federal District Court from Abe Lincoln to Abbie Hoffman, Ch. 1 (Northwestern University Press, 2002)

Legal offices
Preceded by Nathaniel Pope	Judge of the United States District Court for the District of Illinois; 1850–1855	Succeeded by Seat abolished
Preceded by Seat established by 10 Stat. 606	Judge of the United States District Court for the Northern District of Illinois; 1855–1869	Succeeded by Henry Williams Blodgett
Preceded by Seat established by 16 Stat. 44	Judge of the United States Circuit Courts for the Seventh Circuit; 1869–1884	Succeeded by Walter Q. Gresham
