= Francis E. Baker =

American judge (1860–1924)

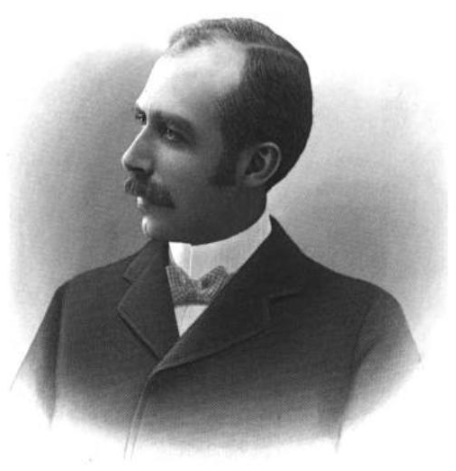

Judge of the United States Court of Appeals for the Seventh Circuit
- In office January 21, 1902 – March 15, 1924
- Appointed by: Theodore Roosevelt
- Preceded by: William Allen Woods
- Succeeded by: Albert B. Anderson

Judge of the United States Circuit Courts for the Seventh Circuit
- In office January 21, 1902 – December 31, 1911
- Appointed by: Theodore Roosevelt
- Preceded by: William Allen Woods
- Succeeded by: Seat abolished

Personal details
- Born: Francis Elisha Baker; October 20, 1860 Goshen, Indiana, U.S.
- Died: March 15, 1924 (aged 63) Chicago, Illinois, U.S.
- Education: University of Michigan (BA) read law

Francis Elisha Baker (October 20, 1860 – March 15, 1924) was a United States circuit judge of the United States Court of Appeals for the Seventh Circuit and of the United States Circuit Courts for the Seventh Circuit.

== Education and career ==
Born in Goshen, Indiana, Baker was the son of John Baker, a Congressman and federal judge. He received a Bachelor of Arts degree from the University of Michigan in 1882 and read law to enter the bar in 1884. He was in private practice in Goshen from 1884 to 1899. He was a justice of the Indiana Supreme Court from January 2, 1899, to January 25, 1902.

== Federal judicial service ==
Baker was nominated by President Theodore Roosevelt on December 11, 1901, to a joint seat on the United States Court of Appeals for the Seventh Circuit and the United States Circuit Courts for the Seventh Circuit vacated by Judge William Allen Woods. He was confirmed by the United States Senate on January 21, 1902, and received his commission the same day. On December 31, 1911, the Circuit Courts were abolished and he thereafter served only on the Court of Appeals. Following the retirement of Justice William R. Day, Judge Baker was on Warren G. Harding‘s shortlist to replace him on the Supreme Court, but the seat ultimately went to Pierce Butler. He was a member of the Conference of Senior Circuit Judges (now the Judicial Conference of the United States) from 1922 to 1923. His service terminated on March 15, 1924, due to his death in Chicago, Illinois.

== Sources ==
Legal offices
Preceded by Timothy E. Howard	Justice of the Indiana Supreme Court; 1899–1902	Succeeded by John H. Gillett
Preceded by William Allen Woods	Judge of the United States Circuit Courts for the Seventh Circuit; 1902–1911	Succeeded by Seat abolished
Preceded by William Allen Woods	Judge of the United States Court of Appeals for the Seventh Circuit; 1902–1924	Succeeded by Albert B. Anderson
