= Roger Kiley =

American football player and judge (1900–1974)

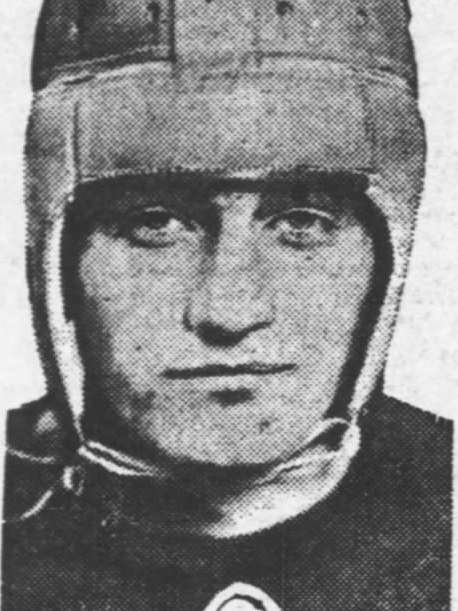
- Kiley while playing American football at the University of Notre Dame

Senior Judge of the United States Court of Appeals for the Seventh Circuit
- In office January 1, 1974 – September 6, 1974

Judge of the United States Court of Appeals for the Seventh Circuit
- In office June 30, 1961 – January 1, 1974
- Appointed by: John F. Kennedy
- Preceded by: William Lynn Parkinson
- Succeeded by: Philip Willis Tone

Judge of the Illinois Appellate Court First District
- In office 1941–1961

Judge of the Superior Court of Cook County
- In office 1940

Personal details
- Born: Roger Joseph Kiley; October 23, 1900 Chicago, Illinois, US
- Died: September 6, 1974 (aged 73) River Forest, Illinois, US
- Education: Notre Dame Law School (LLB)
- Coaching career

Playing career

Football
- 1919–1921: Notre Dame
- 1923: Chicago Cardinals

Basketball
- 1919–1922: Notre Dame

Baseball
- 1921: Notre Dame
- Positions: End (football); Forward (basketball); Second baseman (baseball)

Coaching career (HC unless noted)

Football
- 1922: Notre Dame (assistant)
- 1923–1927: Loyola (IL)
- 1930–1932: Auburn (assistant)

Accomplishments and honors

Awards
- First-team All-American (1920); Second-team All-American (1921)

Roger Joseph Kiley (October 23, 1900 – September 6, 1974) was an American football player and later a United States circuit judge of the United States Court of Appeals for the Seventh Circuit.

== Education and career ==
Born in Chicago, Kiley received a Bachelor of Laws from Notre Dame Law School in 1923. He was a college athletic coach from 1922 to 1932, as an assistant coach at the University of Notre Dame in 1923, as head coach at Loyola University Chicago from 1923 to 1927, and as an assistant coach at Auburn University from 1927 to 1932. He was a professional football player for the Chicago Cardinals in 1923. He was in private practice of law in Chicago from 1933 to 1940. He was a member of the Chicago Board of Alderman from 1933 to 1940. He was a Judge of the Superior Court of Cook County in Illinois in 1940. He was a Judge of the Illinois Appellate Court for the First District in Chicago from 1941 to 1961.

== College football career ==
A native of Chicago, Kiley was a prominent end for Knute Rockne's Notre Dame Fighting Irish, and one of the sports' first great pass catchers, paired with Eddie Anderson and catching passes from George Gipp. Kiley was hired from Notre Dame in January 1923 to serve as head coach at Loyola University Chicago. He served as head coach at Loyola through the second game of their 1928 season when he resigned to return to a private law practice.

=== Head coaching record ===
Year	Team	Overall	Conference	Standing	Bowl/playoffs
Loyola University Chicago / Loyola Ramblers (Independent) (1923–1928)
1923	Loyola University Chicago	6–3			
1924	Loyola University Chicago	5–2–2			
1925	Loyola University Chicago	6–2			
1926	Loyola	4–3			
1927	Loyola	4–4			
1928	Loyola	1–1			
Loyola University Chicago / Loyola:		26–15–2			
Total:		26–15–2			

== Federal judicial service ==
Kiley was nominated by President John F. Kennedy on June 20, 1961, to a seat on the United States Court of Appeals for the Seventh Circuit vacated by Judge William Lynn Parkinson. He was confirmed by the United States Senate on June 27, 1961, and received his commission on June 30, 1961. He assumed senior status on January 1, 1974. His service was terminated on September 6, 1974, due to his death in River Forest, Illinois.

Legal offices
Preceded by William Lynn Parkinson	Judge of the United States Court of Appeals for the Seventh Circuit; 1961–1974	Succeeded by Philip Willis Tone
