= Grace Durand =

American clubwoman, businesswoman, and temperance activist (1867–1948)

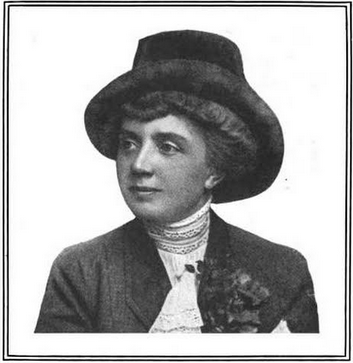
Grace Garrett Durand, from a 1914 publication

Grace Garrett Durand (August 25, 1867 – February 26, 1948), was the spouse of the founder of the S.S. Durand sugar brokerage in Chicago, Illinois, Scott Sloan Durand (1869–1949), and was, in her own right, an owner, manager, and promoter of an American dairy, a temperance activist, and a clubwoman.

== Early life and education ==
Grace Denise Garrett was born in Burlington, Iowa, the daughter of William Garrett and Martha Rorer Garrett. She went to school at St. Mary's in Knoxville, Illinois.

== Career ==
In 1904 Grace Durand began running a model dairy in Lake Forest, Illinois, to sell good quality local milk to Chicagoans, and to support her other projects, such as a kindergarten for children in Chicago's tenements. Separately, Chicago railroad executive and federal judge Henry W. Blodgett owned and managed a 370-acre dairy farm, Crab Tree Farm, a property on Lake Michigan north of the Chicago suburb of Lake Bluff, Illinois (itself north of Lake Forest, Illinois). Scott Sloan Durand (1869–1949), spouse of Grace Garrett Durand and founder of the Chicago sugar brokerage S. S. Durand and Co., purchased a substantial part of the Blodgett farm (250 acres) in 1905. Mrs. Durand relocated her dairy operation to Lake Bluff in 1906.

Mrs. Durand explained in a 1905 interview, "I have not entirely given up society for my dairy... but the work is so interesting that I cannot look upon the time and effort given to it as any sacrifice." Several of the buildings on the farm were lost by fire in 1910; she subsequently commissioned Pullman Village designer and Chicago architect Solon Spencer Beman, and they redesigned and rebuilt the farm. In 1915, her herd of Guernsey cows was destroyed by government officials because they were suspected of carrying foot and mouth disease. She sued for $100,000 in damages. She lectured at farmers' institutes across the American Midwest on her methods and experiences in dairy work, and patented a design for milk jugs.

Grace Durand was the first woman elected to serve on the board of education in Lake Forest, Illinois. She was a member of the Lake Forest Golf Club, and president of the Lake Bluff chapter of the Women's Christian Temperance Union. She wrote a book, Consider, opposing the repeal of Prohibition. Her temperance work was much remarked upon when her husband was accused of participating in a "rum ring" and indicted in 1933. Charges against him were dismissed after the repeal.

== Personal life ==
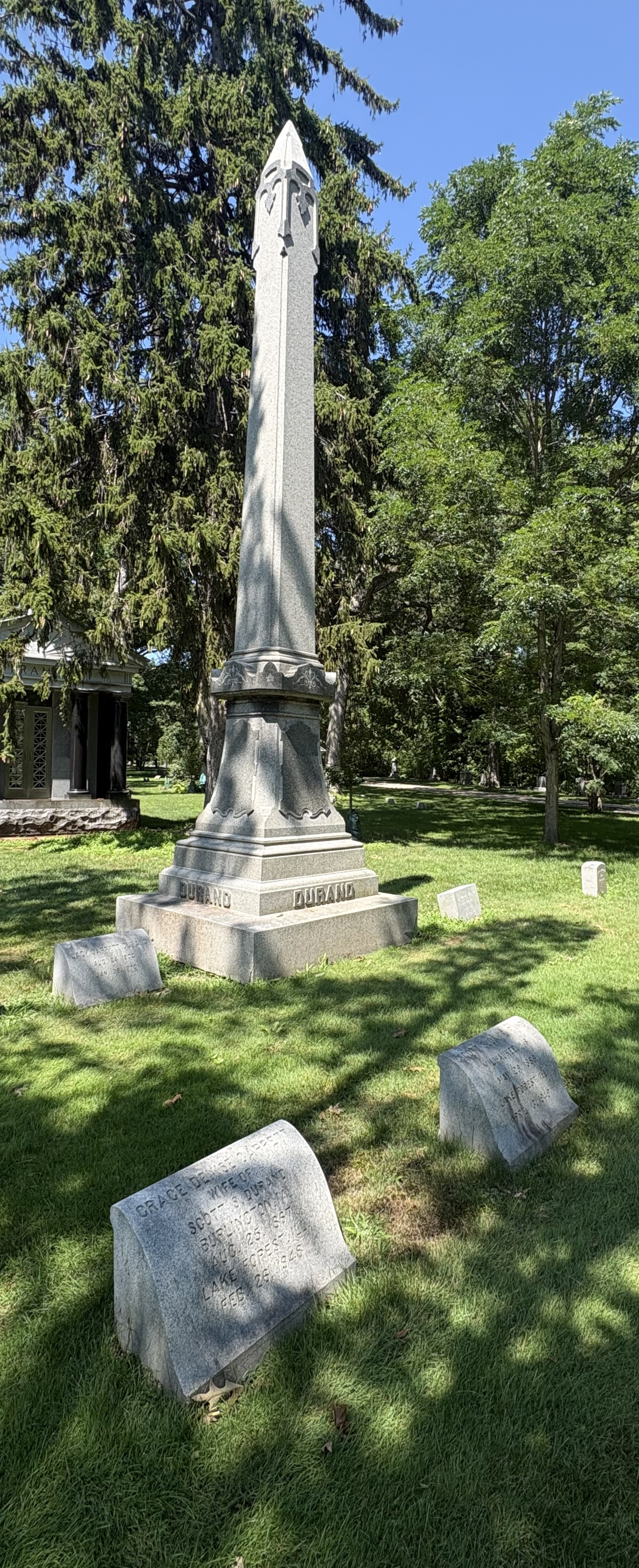
Durand's grave at Lake Forest Cemetery

Grace Garrett Durand was married to a Chicago millionaire, sugar broker Scott Sloan Durand, in 1894. Crab Tree Farm, the site of her dairy, and their home outside of Chicago, as of this date, remains a working farm near Lake Bluff.

The Durands traveled extensively, around the world. Mrs. Durand donated woven and embroidered shawls from India to the Art Institute of Chicago., Their travels included a visit to Tristan da Cunha in 1935.

The Durands adopted two children; their son Jackson G. "Jack" Durand was convicted of robbing the home of F. Edson White in 1926, and served a prison sentence.

Mrs. Durand died in Lake Bluff on February 26, 1948, at the age of 80 years, and was buried at Lake Forest Cemetery.
