= John Simpson Hastings =

American judge (1898–1977)

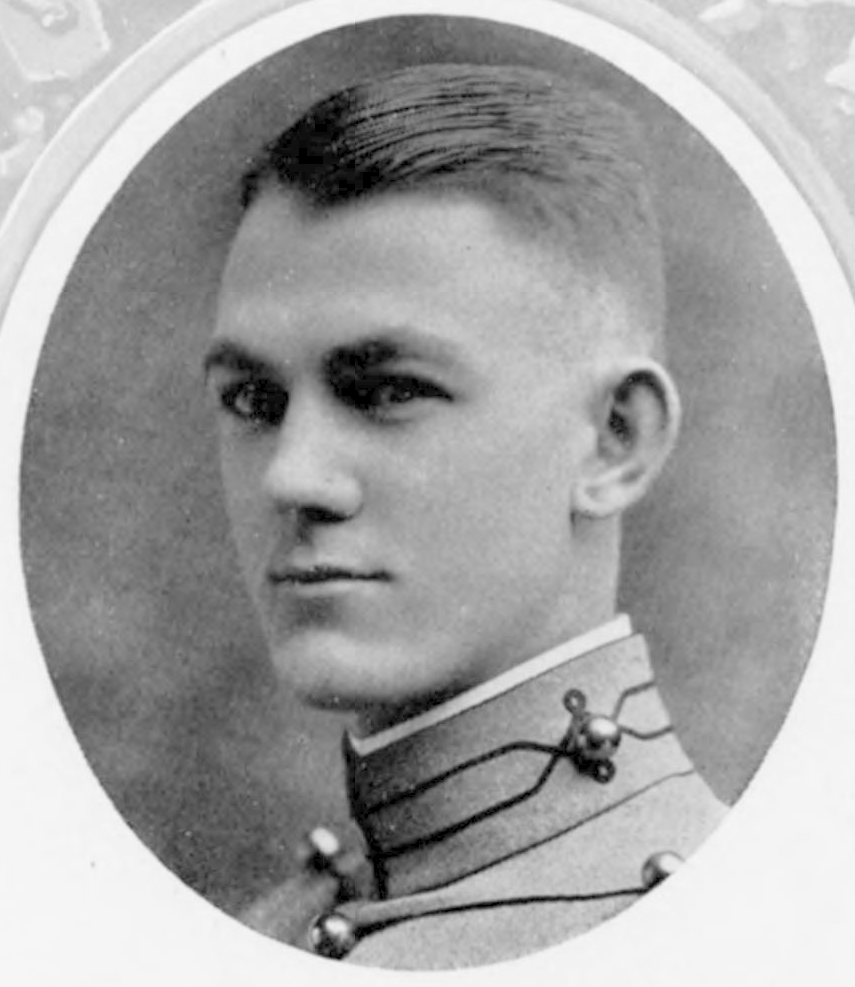
- At West Point in 1920

Senior Judge of the United States Court of Appeals for the Seventh Circuit
- In office February 1, 1969 – February 7, 1977

Chief Judge of the United States Court of Appeals for the Seventh Circuit
- In office 1959–1968
- Preceded by: F. Ryan Duffy
- Succeeded by: Latham Castle

Judge of the United States Court of Appeals for the Seventh Circuit
- In office August 26, 1957 – February 1, 1969
- Appointed by: Dwight D. Eisenhower
- Preceded by: James Earl Major
- Succeeded by: Wilbur Frank Pell Jr.

Personal details
- Born: John Simpson Hastings; June 30, 1898 Washington, Indiana
- Died: February 7, 1977 (aged 78) Chicago, Illinois
- Education: United States Military Academy (BA); Indiana University Maurer School of Law (LLB)

John Simpson Hastings (June 30, 1898 – February 7, 1977) was a United States circuit judge of the United States Court of Appeals for the Seventh Circuit.

== Early life and education ==
John Simpson Hastings was born June 30, 1898, in Washington, Indiana. He graduated from Washington High School in 1916 and attended Indiana University from 1916 to 1918. He left IU to attend the United States Military Academy at West Point, New York. Hastings received a Bachelor of Science degree from West Point in 1920 and a commission as a second lieutenant in the United States Army Field Artillery. He reached the rank of first lieutenant before resigning from the army in 1921. After leaving the army, Hastings entered the Indiana University School of Law. In his senior year of law school, he won the Gamma Eta Gamma award for the highest scholastic average. Hastings graduated with a LL.B. in 1924. He practiced law in his hometown of Washington from 1924 to 1957.

== Indiana University ==
Hastings served as president of the Indiana University Alumni Association from 1933 to 1935. On June 17, 1935, Hastings and Uz McMurtrie, representing the IU Alumni Council, appeared before the IU Board of Trustees to propose the establishment of the Indiana University Foundation. Hastings was a charter member of the IU Foundation and served on its board of directors from 1936 to 1969. He was Vice President of the IU Foundation from 1951 to 1969. After his resignation, he was made an honorary director for life.

Hastings was an Indiana University trustee from 1936 through 1959. He was President of the IU Board of Trustees from 1950 to 1959. Hastings also served on IU President John Ryan's Ad Hoc Committee of Special Consultants on Legal Education at Indiana University in 1975. He was a member of the Board of Visitors for the IU School of Law from 1970 to 1977.

== Federal judicial service ==
Hastings was nominated by President Dwight D. Eisenhower on March 14, 1957, to a seat on the United States Court of Appeals for the Seventh Circuit vacated by Judge James Earl Major. He was confirmed by the United States Senate on August 22, 1957, and received his commission on August 26, 1957. He served as Chief Judge and as a member of the Judicial Conference of the United States from 1959 to 1968. Hastings retired on February 1, 1969, but continued as an active senior judge. In January 1972, Chief Justice Warren E. Burger of the Supreme Court named Hastings as Circuit Judge of the Temporary Emergency Court of Appeals of the United States. His judicial service was terminated on February 7, 1977, due to his death.

== Death ==
Hastings died at Northwestern Memorial Hospital in Chicago on February 7, 1977, at age 78. He was survived by his wife, Mary Esther Smiley Hastings.

== Honors ==
Hastings received honorary LL.D.s from Indiana University in 1959 and Northwestern University in 1961. He received Order of the Coif from Phi Beta Kappa in 1968. Hastings received a law award from the Lincoln Academy of Illinois in 1967. He was also awarded membership into the Indiana Academy in 1972.

== Sources ==
- Archives Online at Indiana University: John Simpson Hastings papers, 1933-1977, bulk 1959-1976

Legal offices
Preceded by James Earl Major	Judge of the United States Court of Appeals for the Seventh Circuit; 1957–1969	Succeeded by Wilbur Frank Pell Jr.
Preceded by F. Ryan Duffy	Chief Judge of the United States Court of Appeals for the Seventh Circuit; 1959–1968	Succeeded by Latham Castle
