= Henry Williams Blodgett =

American judge (1821–1905)

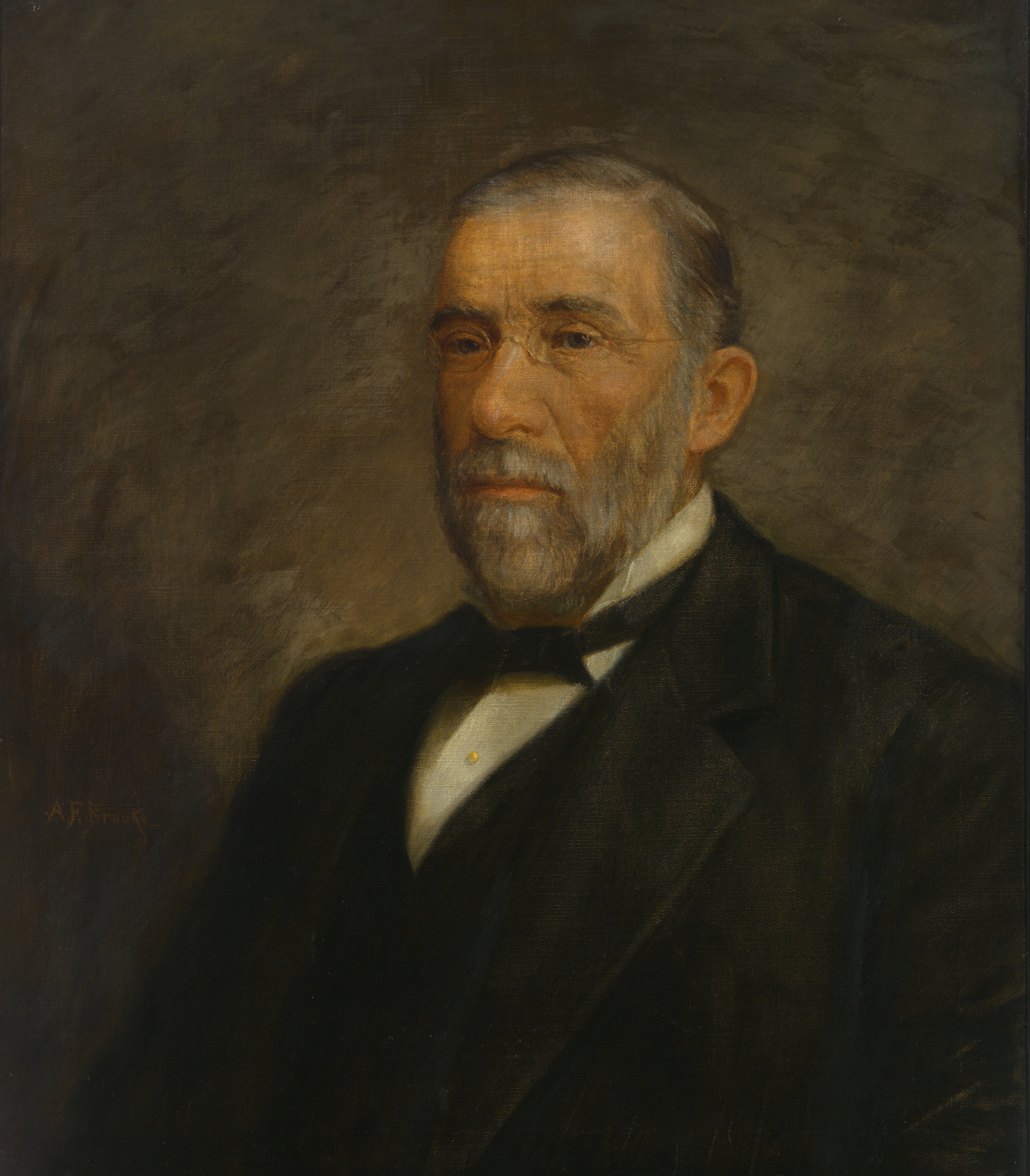

Judge of the United States District Court for the Northern District of Illinois
- In office January 11, 1870 – December 5, 1892
- Appointed by: Ulysses S. Grant
- Preceded by: Thomas Drummond
- Succeeded by: Peter S. Grosscup

Member of the Illinois Senate
- In office 1858-1862

Member of the Illinois House of Representatives
- In office 1852-1854

Personal details
- Born: Henry Williams Blodgett; July 21, 1821 Amherst, Massachusetts
- Died: February 9, 1905 (aged 83) Waukegan, Illinois
- Education: read law

Henry Williams Blodgett (July 21, 1821 – February 9, 1905) was a United States district judge of the United States District Court for the Northern District of Illinois.

== Education and career ==
Born on July 21, 1821, in Amherst, Massachusetts, Blodgett read law in 1844. He entered private practice in Waukegan, Illinois from 1845 to 1869. He was a member of the Illinois House of Representatives from 1852 to 1854. He was a member of the Illinois Senate from 1858 to 1862.

== Federal judicial service ==
Blodgett was nominated by President Ulysses S. Grant on January 10, 1870, to a seat on the United States District Court for the Northern District of Illinois vacated by Judge Thomas Drummond. He was confirmed by the United States Senate on January 11, 1870, and received his commission the same day. His service terminated on December 5, 1892, due to his retirement.

== Later career and death ==
Following his retirement from the federal bench, Blodgett served as United States counsel before the Bering Sea Tribunal of Arbitration for settlement of differences between the United States and Great Britain involving fur seal fisheries in the Bering Sea from 1892 to 1893. Blodgett owned Crab Tree Farm in Lake Bluff, Illinois, which was later sold and split between William M. Blair and Grace Durand, and is still in operation. He died on February 9, 1905, in Waukegan.

== Sources ==
- Richard Cahan, A Court That Shaped America: Chicago's Federal District Court from Abe Lincoln to Abbie Hoffman (Northwestern University Press, 2002)
- Henry W. Blodgett's Autobiography (1906)
- Henry W. Blodgett's Autobiography (1906)

Legal offices
Preceded by Thomas Drummond	Judge of the United States District Court for the Northern District of Illinois; 1870–1892	Succeeded by Peter S. Grosscup
