= William Lynn Parkinson =

American judge (1902–1959)

Judge of the United States Court of Appeals for the Seventh Circuit
- In office August 26, 1957 – October 26, 1959
- Appointed by: Dwight D. Eisenhower
- Preceded by: Hardress Nathaniel Swaim
- Succeeded by: Roger Kiley

Judge of the United States District Court for the Northern District of Indiana
- In office August 6, 1954 – September 9, 1957
- Appointed by: Dwight D. Eisenhower
- Preceded by: Seat established by 68 Stat. 8
- Succeeded by: Robert A. Grant

Personal details
- Born: William Lynn Parkinson; September 18, 1902 Attica, Indiana
- Died: October 26, 1959 (aged 57)
- Education: read law

William Lynn Parkinson (September 18, 1902 – October 26, 1959) was a United States circuit judge of the United States Court of Appeals for the Seventh Circuit and previously was a United States district judge of the United States District Court for the Northern District of Indiana.

== Education and career ==
Born in Attica, Indiana, Parkinson read law to enter the bar in 1923. He was in private practice in Lafayette, Indiana, from 1923 to 1937. He was a Judge of the Indiana Circuit Court for the Twenty-Third Judicial Circuit from 1937 to 1954.

== Federal judicial service ==
Parkinson was nominated by President Dwight D. Eisenhower on August 2, 1954, to the United States District Court for the Northern District of Indiana, to a new seat authorized by 68 Stat. 8. He was confirmed by the United States Senate on August 6, 1954, and received his commission on August 6, 1954. His service terminated on September 9, 1957, due to his elevation to the Seventh Circuit.

Parkinson was nominated by President Eisenhower on August 21, 1957, to a seat on the United States Court of Appeals for the Seventh Circuit vacated by Judge Hardress Nathan Swaim. He was confirmed by the Senate on August 22, 1957, and received his commission on August 26, 1957. His service terminated on October 26, 1959, due to his death.

== Death ==
Parkinson disappeared on October 26, 1959, under mysterious circumstances while returning to his apartment from his Chicago, Illinois, judicial office. Witnesses who saw him shortly before his disappearance indicated that he appeared to be ill. He disappeared in the immediate area of Lake Michigan. His hat, sunglasses and umbrella were later found on the lake shore. His body was found six months later on April 24, 1960, in the water one half mile from where he disappeared and was positively identified. The cause of death was determined to be drowning. An inquest on May 2, 1960, indicated his death was under mysterious circumstances and did not rule out either natural death or foul play.

== Sources ==
Legal offices
Preceded by Seat established by 68 Stat. 8	Judge of the United States District Court for the Northern District of Indiana; 1954–1957	Succeeded by Robert A. Grant
Preceded by Hardress Nathaniel Swaim	Judge of the United States Court of Appeals for the Seventh Circuit; 1957–1959	Succeeded by Roger Kiley
