= Linda Rogers =

Linda Rogers may refer to:

- Linda Rogers (poet) (born 1944), Canadian poet and children's writer
- Linda Rogers (politician), American politician
