= Clarence Manion =

American lawyer and radio host (1896–1979)

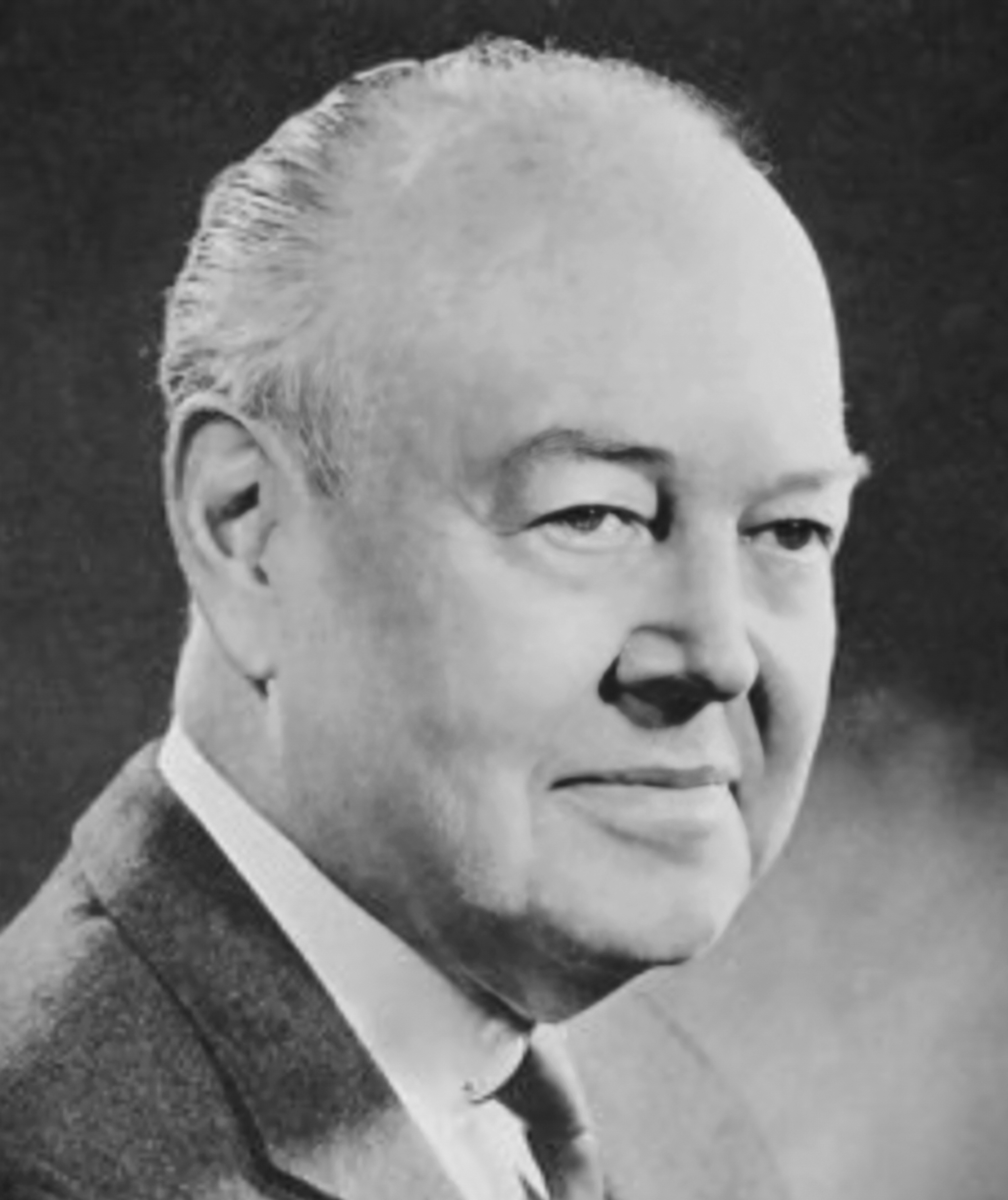

4th Dean of the Notre Dame Law School
- In office 1941–1952
- Preceded by: Thomas F. Konop
- Succeeded by: Joseph O'Meara

Personal details
- Born: July 7, 1896 Henderson, Kentucky, U.S.
- Died: July 29, 1979 (aged 83) South Bend, Indiana, U.S.
- Party: Democratic
- Children: Daniel Anthony Manion
- Education: St. Mary's College (BA); Catholic University (MA, MPhil); University of Notre Dame (JD)

Military service
- Branch/service: United States Army
- Years of service: 1917–1919

Clarence E. "Pat" Manion (July 7, 1896 – July 29, 1979) was an American lawyer and conservative radio talk show host who was dean of Notre Dame Law School from 1941 to 1952. He hosted the radio show Manion Forum which later aired on television.

Manion served as a Vice Chairman for the John Birch Society.

== Early life and education ==
Manion was born in Henderson, Kentucky on July 7, 1896. His father was a successful sidewalk contractor. He graduated from St. Mary's College in Marion County, Kentucky in 1915. He received a Master of Arts in 1916 and Master of Philosophy in 1918 from Catholic University of America in Washington, D.C. While at Catholic University, he led an election night rally for Woodrow Wilson's reelection in 1916, leading calls to stay out of World War I. In 1922, he graduated from the University of Notre Dame Law School. While still a law student, he was an instructor in American history.

== Career ==
From 1917 to 1919, he served in the United States Army. From 1922 to 1925, he practiced law with the firm of Walker and Walker in Evansville, Indiana.

In 1925, Manion became a professor of law at Notre Dame. In 1939, he published a government textbook for parochial schools, Lessons in Liberty. The textbook reflected Manion's belief that government's duty was to guarantee a decent standard of living and was largely supportive of President Franklin D. Roosevelt.

He became Dean of Notre Dame Law in 1941. He retired from the university in 1952.

=== Early Democratic campaigns ===
As a young law professor, Manion was an active member in the Indiana Democratic Party. He ran unsuccessful campaigns for the U.S. House and U.S. Senate in 1932 and 1934, respectively. In each campaign, he failed to win the Democratic nomination.

Manion was an active anti-interventionist, and when President Roosevelt began calling for military mobilization in 1940, Manion joined the America First Committee, a non-partisan organization opposed to American involvement in World War II. He was also an ardent anti-communist.

Manion also began to distance himself from the Democratic Party after the Supreme Court's 1942 decision in Wickard v. Filburn, which he believed expanded the definition of "interstate commerce" beyond reasonable limits.

=== Presidential politics ===
In 1952, following his retirement from Notre Dame, Manion campaigned for Republican Robert A. Taft's presidential campaign, though he remained a Democrat. After Dwight D. Eisenhower won the presidential election instead, Taft promoted Manion for the position of United States Attorney General in Eisenhower's cabinet. Eisenhower instead appointed Manion as chairman of the Intergovernmental Relations Committee, a commission charged with reviewing the balance of power between federal and state governments.

Manion spent much of 1953 campaigning for the Bricker Amendment, a constitutional amendment that would reduce presidential authority to negotiate and sign treaties. Manion favored its most radical version, which would require a national referendum on any treaty. He was fired from the Intergovernmental Relations Committee in February 1954, evidently over his support of the Amendment.

After leaving the Eisenhower administration, Manion founded and co-chaired (with Robert E. Wood) "For America", an organization pledged to "enlightened nationalism" and combat "[America's] costly, imperialistic foreign policy of tragic super-interventionism and policing this world single-handed with American blood and treasure." He also began a weekly radio broadcast from his hometown of South Bend, Indiana, titled The Manion Forum of Opinion. The show was originally distributed by the Mutual Broadcasting System, then became independent.

In 1956, Manion was a leading backer of T. Coleman Andrews's campaign for President, providing the campaign with funding and staffing through For America. In 1960, he and Representative William Jennings Bryan Dorn recruited Orval Faubus to run on the same ticket in the South. He also spent the year campaigning for an effort to draft Barry Goldwater for the Republican nomination, including publishing the best-selling book Conscience of a Conservative, ghost-written for Goldwater by L. Brent Bozell Jr.

== Personal life ==
Manion's son, Daniel Anthony Manion, served as a federal judge and member of the Indiana Senate. He died from complications of a stroke on July 29, 1979, in South Bend, Indiana, at age 83.

== External references ==
- Hemmer, Nicole (2016). Messengers of the Right: Conservative Media and the Transformation of American Politics. Philadelphia: University of Pennsylvania Press. ISBN 978-0-8122-4839-5.
