= John Baker (Indiana politician) =

American judge and politician (1832–1915)

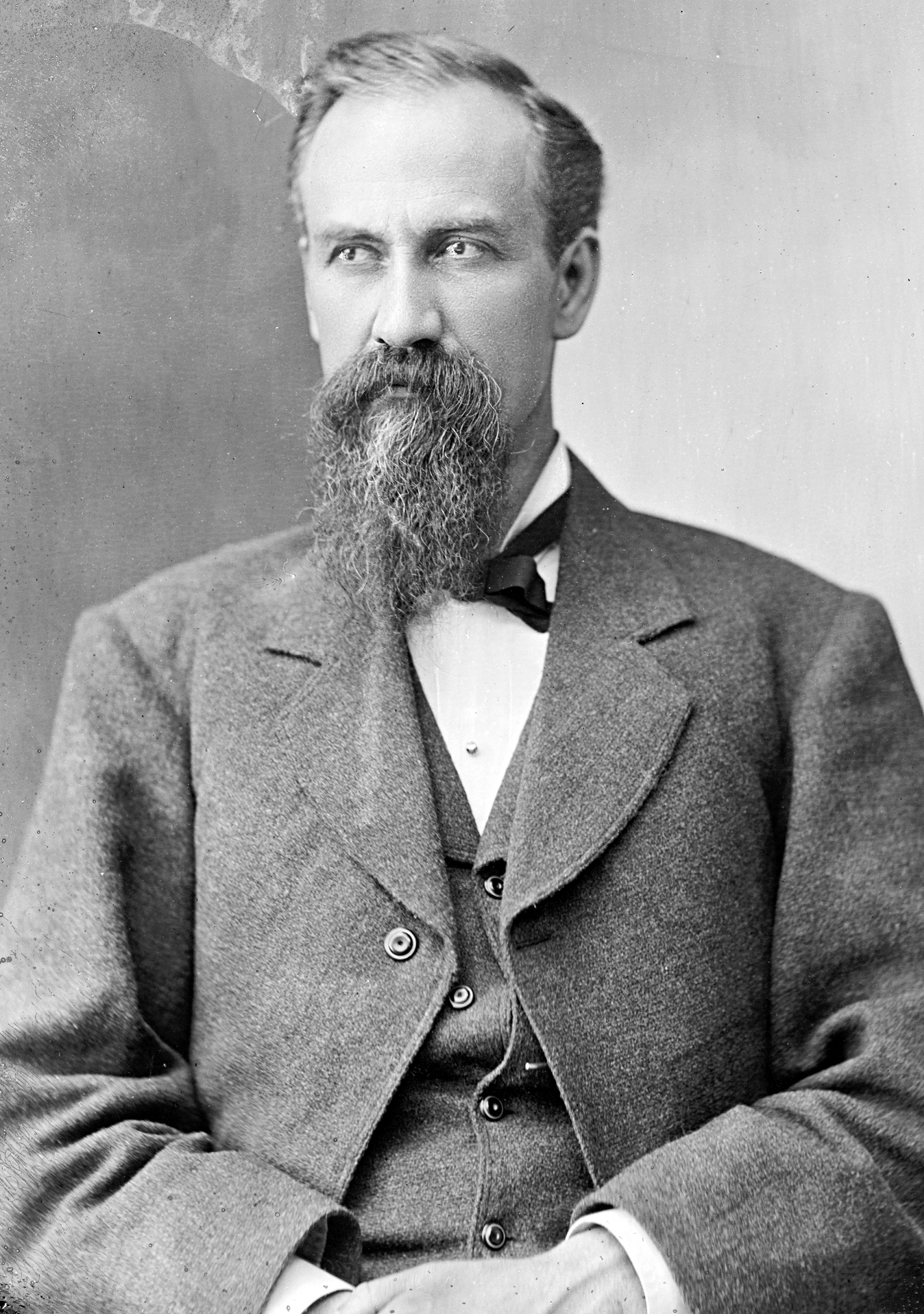

Judge of the United States District Court for the District of Indiana
- In office March 29, 1892 – December 8, 1902
- Appointed by: Benjamin Harrison
- Preceded by: William Allen Woods
- Succeeded by: Albert B. Anderson

Member of the U.S. House of Representatives from Indiana's 13th district
- In office March 4, 1875 – March 3, 1881
- Preceded by: District established
- Succeeded by: William H. Calkins

Personal details
- Born: John Harris Baker; February 28, 1832 Parma, New York, U.S.
- Died: October 21, 1915 (aged 83) Goshen, Indiana, U.S.
- Resting place: Oakridge Cemetery; Goshen, Indiana
- Party: Republican
- Relatives: Lucien Baker
- Education: Wesleyan University (A.M.) read law

John Harris Baker (February 28, 1832 – October 21, 1915) was a three-term United States representative from Indiana (1875 to 1881) and a United States district judge of the United States District Court for the District of Indiana.

== Education and career ==
Born on February 28, 1832, in Parma, Monroe County, New York, Baker moved with his parents to what is now Fulton County, Ohio, where he attended and later taught in the common schools. He received an Artium Magister degree in 1879 from Wesleyan University in Delaware, Ohio. He read law in Adrian, Michigan and was admitted to the bar in 1857. He entered private practice in Goshen, Indiana from 1857 to 1875. He unsuccessfully challenged the election of Charles Lefferts Murray to the Indiana Senate in 1863, but his challenge failed and he was never seated, although he was paid as if he had been a state senator.

== Congressional service ==
Baker was elected as a Republican from Indiana's 13th congressional district to the United States House of Representatives of the 44th, 45th and 46th United States Congresses, serving from March 4, 1875, to March 3, 1881.

=== After Congress ===
He declined to be a candidate for renomination in 1880. Baker resumed private practice in Goshen from 1881 to 1892. He was a delegate to the 1888 Republican National Convention.

== Federal judicial service ==
Baker was nominated by President Benjamin Harrison on March 24, 1892, to a seat on the United States District Court for the District of Indiana vacated by Judge William Allen Woods. He was confirmed by the United States Senate on March 29, 1892, and received his commission the same day. His service terminated on December 8, 1902, due to his retirement.

== Retirement and death ==
Following his retirement, Baker resided in Goshen. He died on October 21, 1915, in Goshen. He is interred in Oakridge Cemetery in Goshen.

== Family ==
Baker was the brother of Lucien Baker, a United States senator from Kansas. He was the father of Judge Francis E. Baker.

== Sources ==
- "Memorial Meeting of the State Bar Association of Indiana in Memory of Hon. John H. Baker," in Report of the Twentieth Annual Meeting of the State Bar Association of Indiana, Held at Lafayette, Indiana, July 13 and 14, 1916. Indianapolis: Harrington and Folger for the Association, n.d. [1916].
- United States Congress. "John Baker (id: B000068)". Biographical Directory of the United States Congress.

U.S. House of Representatives
Preceded by District established	Member of the U.S. House of Representatives from Indiana's 13th congressional district 1875–1881	Succeeded by William H. Calkins
Legal offices
Preceded by William Allen Woods	Judge of the United States District Court for the District of Indiana; 1892–1902	Succeeded by Albert B. Anderson
