= William Allen Woods =

American judge (1837 – 1901)

Judge of the United States Court of Appeals for the Seventh Circuit
- In office March 17, 1892 – June 29, 1901
- Appointed by: Benjamin Harrison
- Preceded by: Seat established by 26 Stat. 826
- Succeeded by: Francis E. Baker

Judge of the United States Circuit Courts for the Seventh Circuit
- In office March 17, 1892 – June 29, 1901
- Appointed by: Benjamin Harrison
- Preceded by: Seat established by 26 Stat. 826
- Succeeded by: Francis E. Baker

Judge of the United States District Court for the District of Indiana
- In office May 2, 1883 – March 21, 1892
- Appointed by: Chester A. Arthur
- Preceded by: Walter Q. Gresham
- Succeeded by: John Baker

Personal details
- Born: William Allen Woods; May 16, 1837 Farmington, Tennessee, U.S.
- Died: June 29, 1901 (aged 64) Indianapolis, Indiana, U.S.
- Children: Alice Woods Ullman
- Education: Wabash College (AB) read law

William Allen Woods (May 16, 1837 – June 29, 1901) was a United States circuit judge of the United States Court of Appeals for the Seventh Circuit and of the United States Circuit Courts for the Seventh Circuit.

== Education and career ==
Born on May 16, 1837, near Farmington, Tennessee, Woods received an Artium Baccalaureus degree from Wabash College in 1859 and read law to enter the bar in 1861. He was in private practice in Goshen, Indiana from 1862 to 1867. He was a member of the Indiana House of Representatives from 1867 to 1869, returning to private practice in Goshen from 1870 to 1873. He was a judge of the 34th Judicial District of Indiana from 1874 to 1880, and then a justice of the Indiana Supreme Court from 1881 to 1883.

== Federal judicial service ==
Woods received a recess appointment from President Chester A. Arthur on May 2, 1883, to a seat on the United States District Court for the District of Indiana vacated by Judge Walter Q. Gresham. He was nominated to the same position by President Arthur on December 18, 1883. He was confirmed by the United States Senate on January 7, 1884, and received his commission the same day. His service terminated on March 21, 1892, due to his elevation to the Seventh Circuit.

Woods was nominated by President Benjamin Harrison on December 16, 1891, to the United States Court of Appeals for the Seventh Circuit and the United States Circuit Courts for the Seventh Circuit, to a new joint seat authorized by 26 Stat. 826. He was confirmed by the Senate on March 17, 1892, and received his commission the same day. His service terminated on June 29, 1901, due to his death in Indianapolis, Indiana.

== Family ==
Woods was the father of painter and writer Alice Woods Ullman.

== Sources ==
Legal offices
Preceded by Horace P. Biddle	Justice of the Indiana Supreme Court; 1881–1883	Succeeded by Edwin Hammond
Preceded by Walter Q. Gresham	Judge of the United States District Court for the District of Indiana; 1883–1892	Succeeded by John Baker
Preceded by Seat established by 26 Stat. 826	Judge of the United States Circuit Courts for the Seventh Circuit; 1892–1901	Succeeded by Francis E. Baker
Preceded by Seat established by 26 Stat. 826	Judge of the United States Court of Appeals for the Seventh Circuit; 1892–1901	Succeeded by Francis E. Baker
