= United States Court of Appeals for the Seventh Circuit =

Current United States federal appellate court

- (7th Cir.)

- Location: Everett McKinley Dirksen U.S. Courthouse (Chicago)
- Appeals from: Central District of Illinois; Northern District of Illinois; Southern District of Illinois; Northern District of Indiana; Southern District of Indiana; Eastern District of Wisconsin; Western District of Wisconsin
- Established: June 16, 1891
- Judges: 11
- Circuit Justice: Amy Coney Barrett
- Chief Judge: Michael B. Brennan
- www.ca7.uscourts.gov

The United States Court of Appeals for the Seventh Circuit (in case citations, 7th Cir.) is the U.S. federal court with appellate jurisdiction over the courts in the following districts:

- Central District of Illinois
- Northern District of Illinois
- Southern District of Illinois
- Northern District of Indiana
- Southern District of Indiana
- Eastern District of Wisconsin
- Western District of Wisconsin

The Seventh District was created by the 9th United States Congress with the Seventh Circuit Act of 1807. The court is based at the Dirksen Federal Building in Chicago and is composed of eleven appellate judges. It is one of 13 United States courts of appeals.

The court offers a relatively unique internet presence that includes wiki and RSS feeds of opinions and oral arguments. It is also notable for having one of the most prominent law and economics scholars, Judge Frank Easterbrook, on its court. Richard Posner, another prominent law and economics scholar, also served on this court until his retirement in 2017. Three judges from the Seventh Circuit, Sherman Minton, John Paul Stevens, and Amy Coney Barrett, have been appointed as Associate Justices of the Supreme Court.

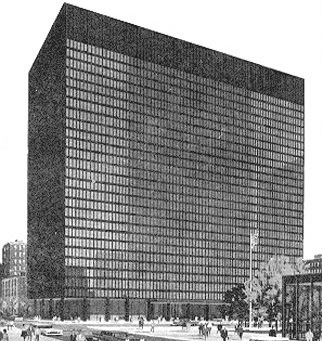
The Dirksen Federal Building, seat of the United States Court of Appeals for the Seventh Circuit.

== Current composition of the court ==
As of December 15, 2025:

#	Title	Judge	Duty station	Born	Term of service			Appointed by
#	Title	Judge	Duty station	Born	Active	Chief	Senior	Appointed by
57	Chief Judge	Michael B. Brennan	Milwaukee, WI	1963	2018–present	2025–present	—	Trump
45	Circuit Judge	Frank Easterbrook	Chicago, IL	1948	1985–present	2006–2013	—	Reagan
58	Circuit Judge	Michael Y. Scudder	Chicago, IL	1971	2018–present	—	—	Trump
59	Circuit Judge	Amy St. Eve	Chicago, IL	1965	2018–present	—	—	Trump
60	Circuit Judge	Thomas Kirsch	Hammond, IN	1974	2020–present	—	—	Trump
61	Circuit Judge	Candace Jackson-Akiwumi	Chicago, IL	1979	2021–present	—	—	Biden
62	Circuit Judge	John Z. Lee	Chicago, IL	1968	2022–present	—	—	Biden
63	Circuit Judge	Doris Pryor	Indianapolis, IN	1977	2022–present	—	—	Biden
64	Circuit Judge	Joshua P. Kolar	Hammond, IN	1976	2024–present	—	—	Biden
65	Circuit Judge	Nancy L. Maldonado	Chicago, IL	1975	2024–present	—	—	Biden
66	Circuit Judge	Rebecca Taibleson	Milwaukee, WI	1983	2025–present	—	—	Trump
46	Senior Judge	Kenneth Francis Ripple	South Bend, IN	1943	1985–2008	—	2008–present	Reagan
49	Senior Judge	Ilana Rovner	Chicago, IL	1938	1992–2024	—	2024–present	G.H.W. Bush
53	Senior Judge	Diane S. Sykes	Milwaukee, WI	1957	2004–2025	2020–2025	2025–present	G.W. Bush
55	Senior Judge	David Hamilton	Bloomington, IN	1957	2009–2022	—	2022–present	Obama

== List of former judges ==
#	Judge	State	Born–died	Active service	Chief Judge	Senior status	Appointed by	Reason for termination
1	Walter Q. Gresham	IN	1832–1895	1891–1893	—	—	Arthur / Operation of law	resignation
2	William Allen Woods	IN	1837–1901	1892–1901	—	—	B. Harrison	death
3	James Graham Jenkins	WI	1834–1921	1893–1905	—	—	Cleveland	retirement
4	John William Showalter	IL	1844–1898	1895–1898	—	—	Cleveland	death
5	Peter S. Grosscup	IL	1852–1921	1899–1911	—	—	McKinley	resignation
6	Francis Elisha Baker	IN	1860–1924	1902–1924	—	—	T. Roosevelt	death
7	William Henry Seaman	WI	1842–1915	1905–1915	—	—	T. Roosevelt	death
8	Christian Cecil Kohlsaat	IL	1844–1918	1905–1918	—	—	T. Roosevelt	death
9	Julian Mack	IL	1866–1943	1911–1929	—	—		reassignment
10	Samuel Alschuler	IL	1859–1939	1915–1936	—	1936–1939	Wilson	death
11	Evan Alfred Evans	WI	1876–1948	1916–1948	—	—	Wilson	death
12	George True Page	IL	1859–1941	1919–1930	—	1930–1941	Wilson	death
13	Albert Barnes Anderson	IN	1857–1938	1925–1929	—	1929–1938	Coolidge	death
14	William Morris Sparks	IN	1872–1950	1929–1948	1948	1948–1950	Hoover	death
15	Louis Fitzhenry	IL	1870–1935	1933–1935	—	—	F. Roosevelt	death
16	James Earl Major	IL	1887–1972	1937–1956	1948–1954	1956–1972	F. Roosevelt	death
17	Walter Emanuel Treanor	IN	1883–1941	1937–1941	—	—	F. Roosevelt	death
18	Otto Kerner Sr.	IL	1884–1952	1938–1952	—	—	F. Roosevelt	death
19	Sherman Minton	IN	1890–1965	1941–1949	—	—	F. Roosevelt	elevation
20	F. Ryan Duffy	WI	1888–1979	1949–1966	1954–1959	1966–1979	Truman	death
21	Philip J. Finnegan	IL	1886–1959	1949–1959	—	—	Truman	death
22	Walter C. Lindley	IL	1880–1958	1949–1958	—	—	Truman	death
23	Hardress Swaim	IN	1880–1957	1949–1957	—	—	Truman	death
24	Elmer Schnackenberg	IL	1889–1968	1953–1968	—	—	Eisenhower	death
25	John Simpson Hastings	IN	1898–1977	1957–1969	1959–1968	1969–1977	Eisenhower	death
26	William Lynn Parkinson	IN	1902–1959	1957–1959	—	—	Eisenhower	death
27	Winfred George Knoch	IL	1895–1983	1958–1967	—	1967–1983	Eisenhower	death
28	Latham Castle	IL	1900–1986	1959–1970	1968–1970	1970–1986	Eisenhower	death
29	Roger Kiley	IL	1900–1974	1961–1974	—	1974	Kennedy	death
30	Luther Merritt Swygert	IN	1905–1988	1961–1981	1970–1975	1981–1988	Kennedy	death
31	Thomas E. Fairchild	WI	1912–2007	1966–1981	1975–1981	1981–2007	L. Johnson	death
32	Walter J. Cummings Jr.	IL	1916–1999	1966–1999	1981–1986	—	L. Johnson	death
33	Otto Kerner Jr.	IL	1908–1976	1968–1974	—	—	L. Johnson	resignation
34	Wilbur Frank Pell Jr.	IN	1915–2000	1970–1984	—	1984–2000	Nixon	death
35	John Paul Stevens	IL	1920–2019	1970–1975	—	—	Nixon	elevation
36	Robert Arthur Sprecher	IL	1917–1982	1971–1982	—	—	Nixon	death
37	Philip Willis Tone	IL	1923–2001	1974–1980	—	—	Nixon	resignation
38	William J. Bauer	IL	1926–2025	1974–1994	1986–1993	1994–2025	Ford	death
39	Harlington Wood Jr.	IL	1920–2008	1976–1992	—	1992–2008	Ford	death
40	Richard Dickson Cudahy	WI	1926–2015	1979–1994	—	1994–2015	Carter	death
41	Jesse E. Eschbach	IN	1920–2005	1981–1985	—	1985–2005	Reagan	death
42	Richard Posner	IL	1939–2026	1981–2017	1993–2000	—	Reagan	retirement
43	John Louis Coffey	WI	1922–2012	1982–2004	—	2004–2012	Reagan	death
44	Joel Flaum	IL	1936–2024	1983–2020	2000–2006	2020–2024	Reagan	death
47	Daniel Anthony Manion	IN	1942–2024	1986–2007	—	2007–2024	Reagan	death
48	Michael Stephen Kanne	IN	1938–2022	1987–2022	—	—	Reagan	death
50	Diane Wood	IL	1950–present	1995–2022	2013–2020	2022–2024	Clinton	retirement
51	Terence T. Evans	WI	1940–2011	1995–2010	—	2010–2011	Clinton	death
52	Ann Claire Williams	IL	1949–present	1999–2017	—	2017–2018	Clinton	retirement
54	John Daniel Tinder	IN	1950–present	2007–2015	—	2015	G.W. Bush	retirement
56	Amy Coney Barrett	IN	1972–present	2017–2020	—	—	Trump	elevation

== Chief judges ==
Chief Judge
Sparks	1948
Major	1948–1954
Duffy	1954–1959
Hastings	1959–1968
Castle	1968–1970
Swygert	1970–1975
Fairchild	1975–1981
Cummings, Jr.	1981–1986
Bauer	1986–1993
Posner	1993–2000
Flaum	2000–2006
Easterbrook	2006–2013
D. Wood	2013–2020
Sykes	2020–2025
Brennan	2025–present

Chief judges have administrative responsibilities with respect to their circuits, and preside over any panel on which they serve, unless the circuit justice (the Supreme Court justice responsible for the circuit) is also on the panel. Unlike the Supreme Court, where one justice is specifically nominated to be chief, the office of chief judge rotates among the circuit judges.

To be chief, a judge must have been in active service on the court for at least one year, be under the age of 65, and have not previously served as chief judge. A vacancy is filled by the judge highest in seniority among the group of qualified judges, with seniority determined first by commission date, then by age. The chief judge serves for a term of seven years, or until age 70, whichever occurs first. If no judge qualifies to be chief, the youngest judge over the age of 65 who has served on the court for at least one year shall act as chief until another judge qualifies. If no judge has served on the court for more than a year, the most senior judge shall act as chief. Judges can forfeit or resign their chief judgeship or acting chief judgeship while retaining their active status as a circuit judge.

When the office was created in 1948, the chief judge was the longest-serving judge who had not elected to retire, on what has since 1958 been known as senior status, or declined to serve as chief judge. After August 6, 1959, judges could not become or remain chief after turning 70 years old. The current rules have been in operation since October 1, 1982.

== Succession of seats ==
The court has eleven seats for active judges, numbered in the order in which they were initially filled. Judges who assume senior status enter a kind of retirement in which they remain on the bench but vacate their seats, thus allowing the U.S. President to appoint new judges to fill their seats.

Seat 1
Established on December 10, 1869 by the Judiciary Act of 1869 as a circuit judgeship for the Seventh Circuit
Reassigned to the United States Circuit Court of Appeals for the Seventh Circuit by the Judiciary Act of 1891
Gresham	IN	1891–1893
Jenkins	WI	1893–1905
Seaman	WI	1905–1915
E. Evans	WI	1916–1948
Duffy	WI	1949–1966
Fairchild	WI	1966–1981
Coffey	WI	1982–2004
Sykes	WI	2004–2025
Taibleson	WI	2025–present

Seat 2
Established on June 16, 1891 by the Judiciary Act of 1891
Woods	IN	1892–1901
Baker	IN	1902–1924
Anderson	IN	1925–1929
Sparks	IN	1929–1948
Finnegan	IL	1949–1959
Castle	IL	1959–1970
Sprecher	IL	1971–1982
Flaum	IL	1983–2020
Jackson-Akiwumi	IL	2021–present

Seat 3
Established on February 8, 1895 by 28 Stat. 643
Showalter	IL	1895–1898
Grosscup	IL	1899–1911
Alschuler	IL	1915–1936
Treanor	IN	1937–1941
Minton	IN	1941–1949
Lindley	IL	1949–1958
Knoch	IL	1958–1967
Kerner, Jr.	IL	1968–1974
Bauer	IL	1974–1994
D. Wood	IL	1995–2022
Lee	IL	2022–present

Seat 4
Established on March 3, 1905 by 33 Stat. 992
Kohlsaat	IL	1905–1918
Page	IL	1919–1930
FitzHenry	IL	1933–1935
Major	IL	1937–1956
Hastings	IN	1957–1969
Pell, Jr.	IN	1970–1984
Manion	IN	1986–2007
Tinder	IN	2007–2015
Barrett	IN	2017–2020
Kirsch	IN	2020–present

Seat 5
Established on May 31, 1938 by 52 Stat. 584
Kerner, Sr.	IL	1938–1952
Schnackenberg	IL	1954–1968
Stevens	IL	1970–1975
H. Wood, Jr.	IL	1976–1992
Rovner	IL	1992–2024
Maldonado	IL	2024–present

Seat 6
Established on August 3, 1949 by 63 Stat. 493
Swaim	IN	1950–1957
Parkinson	IN	1957–1959
Kiley	IL	1961–1974
Tone	IL	1974–1980
Posner	IL	1981–2017
Scudder, Jr.	IL	2018–present

Seat 7
Established on May 19, 1961 by 75 Stat. 80
Swygert	IN	1961–1981
Eschbach	IN	1981–1985
Kanne	IN	1987–2022
Kolar	IN	2024–present

Seat 8
Established on March 18, 1966 by 80 Stat. 75
Cummings, Jr.	IL	1966–1999
Williams	IL	1999–2017
St. Eve	IL	2018–present

Seat 9
Established on October 20, 1978 by 92 Stat. 1629, 1632
Cudahy	WI	1979–1994
T. Evans	WI	1995–2010
Brennan	WI	2018–present

Seat 10
Established on July 10, 1984 by 98 Stat. 333
Easterbrook	IL	1985–present

Seat 11
Established on July 10, 1984 by 98 Stat. 333
Ripple	IN	1985–2008
Hamilton	IN	2009–2022
Pryor	IN	2022–present

== See also ==
- Courts of Illinois
- Judicial appointment history for United States federal courts § Seventh Circuit
- List of current United States circuit judges
