= John William Showalter =

American judge (1844-1898)

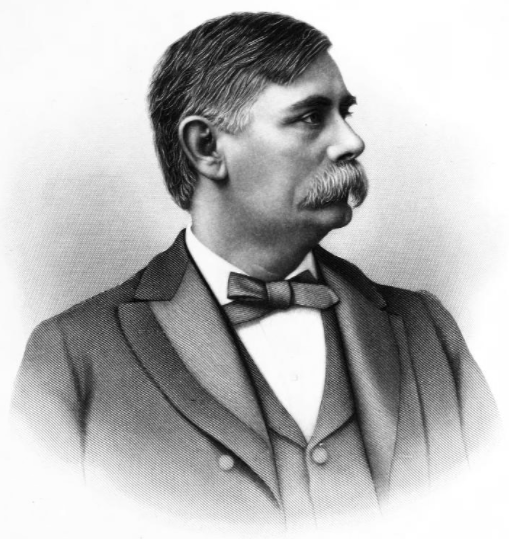

Judge of the United States Court of Appeals for the Seventh Circuit
- In office March 1, 1895 – December 10, 1898
- Appointed by: Grover Cleveland
- Preceded by: Seat established by 28 Stat. 643
- Succeeded by: Peter S. Grosscup

Judge of the United States Circuit Courts for the Seventh Circuit
- In office March 1, 1895 – December 10, 1898
- Appointed by: Grover Cleveland
- Preceded by: Seat established by 28 Stat. 643
- Succeeded by: Peter S. Grosscup

Personal details
- Born: John William Showalter; February 8, 1844 Mason County, Kentucky
- Died: December 10, 1898 (aged 54) Chicago, Illinois
- Education: Yale University read law

John William Showalter (February 8, 1844 – December 10, 1898) was a United States circuit judge of the United States Court of Appeals for the Seventh Circuit and of the United States Circuit Courts for the Seventh Circuit.

== Education and career ==
John William Showalter was born in Mason County, Kentucky on February 8, 1844. He graduated from Yale University in 1867 and read law to enter the bar in 1871. He was in private practice in Chicago, Illinois from 1870 to 1895.

== Federal judicial service ==
Showalter was nominated by President Grover Cleveland on February 25, 1895, to the United States Court of Appeals for the Seventh Circuit and the United States Circuit Courts for the Seventh Circuit, to a new joint seat authorized by 28 Stat. 643. He was confirmed by the United States Senate on March 1, 1895, and received his commission the same day. His service terminated on December 10, 1898, due to his death in Chicago.

== Sources ==
Legal offices
| Preceded by Seat established by 28 Stat. 643 | Judge of the United States Circuit Courts for the Seventh Circuit; 1895–1898 | Succeeded by Peter S. Grosscup |
| Preceded by Seat established by 28 Stat. 643 | Judge of the United States Court of Appeals for the Seventh Circuit; 1895–1898 | Succeeded by Peter S. Grosscup |
