= Judicial Conference of the United States =

Agency of the United States judicial courts

The Judicial Conference of the United States, formerly known as the Conference of Senior Circuit Judges, was created by the United States Congress in 1922 with the principal objective of framing policy guidelines for administration of judicial courts in the United States. The Conference derives its authority from 28 U.S.C. § 331, which states that it is headed by the chief justice of the United States and consists of the chief justice, the chief judge of each court of appeals federal regional circuit, a district court judge from various federal judicial districts, and the chief judge of the United States Court of International Trade.

== History ==
Responding to a backlog of cases in the federal courts, in 1922 Congress enacted a new form of court administration that advanced the institutionalization of an independent judiciary. The establishment of an annual Conference of Senior Circuit Judges, later to be known as the Judicial Conference of the United States, culminated more than a decade of public debate on the reform of judicial administration. The Conference of Senior Circuit Judges provided the first formal mechanism by which members of the federal judiciary might develop national administrative policies, reassign judges temporarily, and recommend legislation.

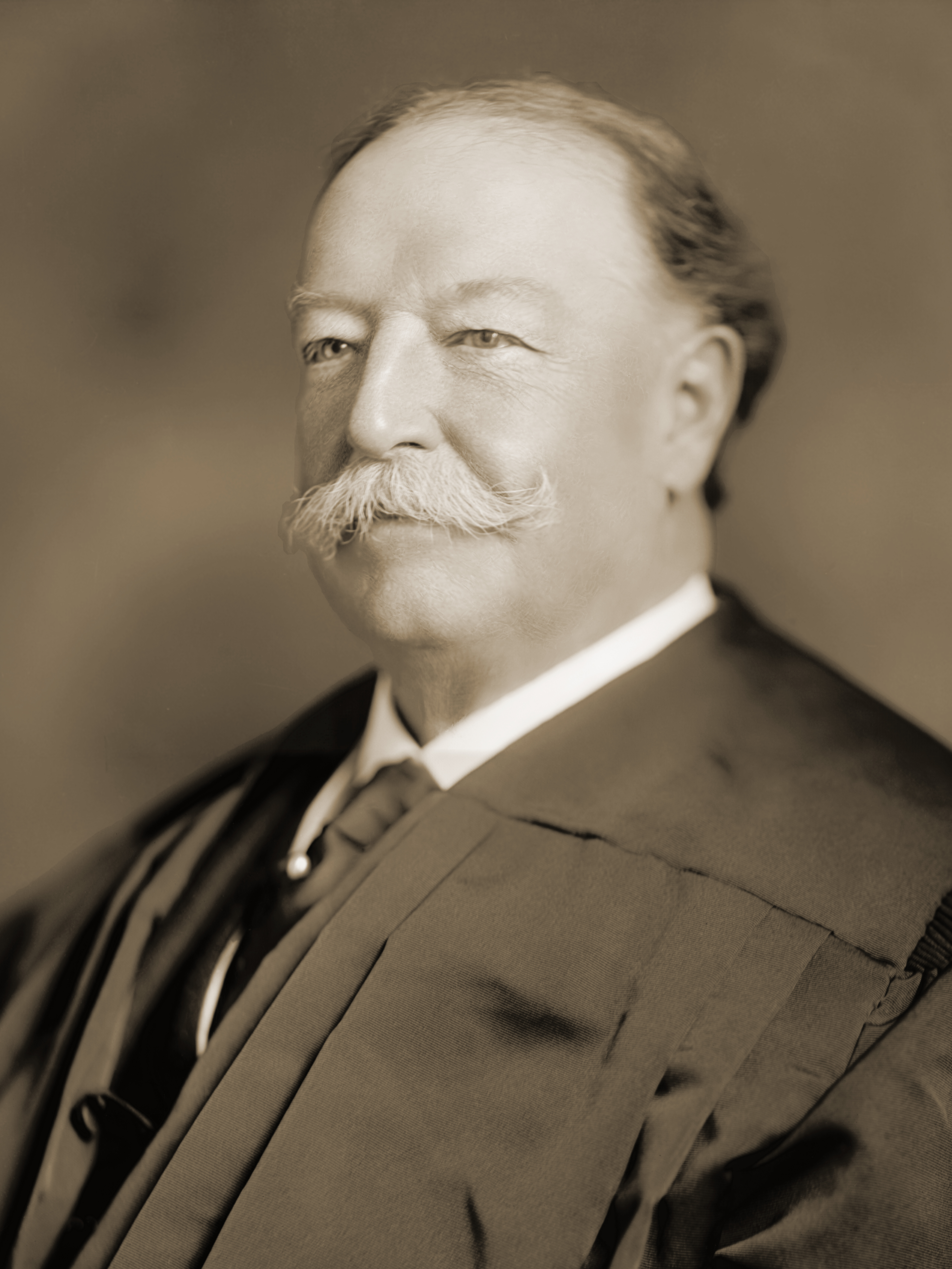
Chief Justice Taft led a public campaign for federal judicial reform

Chief Justice William Howard Taft, appointed to the Supreme Court in 1921, had led a public campaign for federal judicial reform since leaving the White House in 1913. Taft proposed the appointment of at-large judges, what he called a "flying squadron", that could be assigned temporarily to congested courts. In Taft's plan, a conference of judges would serve primarily to assess the caseload of the lower courts and assign the at-large judges to courts in need. Taft, supported by a group of federal judges and legal scholars, hoped that the establishment of a more efficient federal judiciary would deflect the efforts of Senator George W. Norris and others who advocated an end to life tenure on the federal bench and the restriction of the lower federal courts' jurisdiction.

By the time Taft became Chief Justice, the increased caseload resulting from World War I and the enforcement of Prohibition had contributed to broad support for reform of the federal judiciary. Assuming a role as leader of the judiciary as well as the Supreme Court, Taft joined with Attorney General Harry M. Daugherty and appeared before the Senate Judiciary Committee to urge legislation. A large majority in Congress agreed with the need for reform, but both the Senate and the House of Representatives insisted on revising Taft's proposals so that they conformed more closely to the traditions of the federal judiciary.

Congress established an annual conference of the chief justice of the United States (or the senior associate justice if the chief is unable), and the senior circuit judge (now called the chief judge) from each judicial circuit and charged the conference with a general mandate to advise on the administrative needs of the federal courts. The act required the senior judge in each district to prepare an annual report of the business of the district's court. The conference would use these reports to prepare suggestions for the temporary transfer of judges, pending the approval of all courts involved. This expansion of the authority to transfer judges fell far short of Taft's concept of a permanent corps of at-large judges. Congress established 24 temporary judgeships, but adhered to the principle of fixed residency for district judges. Congress also declined to make the attorney general a member of the conference, although the act permitted the chief justice to request the attorney general to report on the business of the courts. Even without a formal relationship with Congress or the Department of Justice (which then administered the federal courts), the conference offered the judiciary a means of communicating its administrative needs.

The conference was renamed the Judicial Conference of the United States in 1948. In 1956, Congress provided for the inclusion of the chief judge of the Court of Claims. At that time, the judges of the Court of Customs and Patent Appeals (CCPA) declined to include a representative on the conference. The size of the conference nearly doubled following an act of 1957 that provided for the appellate and district judges in each circuit to elect a district judge to represent the circuit on the conference for a term of three years. In 1961 the chief judge of the CCPA began serving on the conference. The chief judges of these Court of Claims and the CCPA served on the conference until 1982 when their courts merged to become the United States Court of Appeals for the Federal Circuit. In 1990, Congress provided for the inclusion of the chief judge of the United States Court of International Trade. In 1996, Congress expanded the district judge term up to five years and allowed senior district judges to serve.

== Committee activities ==
The Judicial Conference last revised its Advisory Committee structure in 1987, then naming a total of 20 Standing Advisory Committees, seven of which were then newly organized, and several of which absorbed other, previous Committees:

- Committee on Administration of the Bankruptcy System, 1968–present
- Committee on Administration of the Magistrate Judges System, 1991–present
- Committee on Audits and Administrative Office Accountability, 2009–present
- Committee on the Budget, 1959–present
- Committee on Codes of Conduct, 1987–present
- Committee on Court Administration and Case Management, 1990–present
- Committee on Criminal Law, 1992–present
- Committee on Defender Services, 1987–present
- Executive Committee, 1968–present
- Committee on Federal-State Jurisdiction, 1987–present
- Committee on Financial Disclosure, 1992–present
- Committee on Information Technology, 2002–present
- Committee on Intercircuit Assignments, 1968–present
- Committee on International Judicial Relations, 1993–present
- Committee on the Judicial Branch, 1980–present
- Committee on Judicial Conduct and Disability, 2007–present
- Committee on Judicial Resources, 1987–present
- Committee on Judicial Security, 2006–present
- Committee on Rules of Practice and Procedure, 1958–present
- Committee on Space and Facilities, 2006–present

Each Advisory Committee is charged, respectively, with drafting proposed amendments for submission to the:

- Federal Rules of Civil Procedure;
- Federal Rules of Criminal Procedure;
- Federal Rules of Bankruptcy Procedure;
- Federal Rules of Appellate Procedure; and
- Federal Rules of Evidence.

Members of the Advisory Committees include judges, representatives from the Department of Justice, law professors, and practicing attorneys. The Advisory Committees propose rules, subject them to public comment, and then submit them to the Standing Committee on Rules of Practice and Procedure, which in turn submits them to the Judicial Conference, which recommends them to the Supreme Court for approval. Explanatory notes of the drafting Advisory Committee are published along with the final adopted rules, and are frequently used as an authority on the interpretation of the rules.

Other active policy areas concern the operation of CM/ECF, the Case Management/Electronic Case Files system, and PACER, the electronic public access service for United States federal court documents.

On occasion, the Conference has authorized investigations of federal judges accused of criminal malfeasance. Those deemed guilty have been referred to the House Judiciary Committee for impeachment. This has happened three times during the 21st century.

== Administrative Office of the United States Courts ==
The Administrative Office of the United States Courts (AO) is the administrative agency of the United States federal court system. The AO is the central support entity for the federal judicial branch. It provides a wide range of administrative, legal, financial, management, program, and information technology services to the federal courts. It was established in 1939.

The AO is directly supervised by the Judicial Conference, and implements and executes Judicial Conference policies, as well as applicable federal statutes and regulations. The AO facilitates communications within the judiciary and with Congress, the executive branch, and the public on behalf of the judiciary.

== Judicial councils ==
Judicial councils are panels of each federal judicial circuit that are charged with making "necessary and appropriate orders for the effective and expeditious administration of justice" within their circuits. Among their responsibilities is judicial discipline, the formulation of circuit policy, the implementation of policy directives received from the Judicial Conference, and the annual submission of a report to the Administrative Office on the number and nature of orders entered during the year that relate to judicial misconduct. Each judicial circuit consists of the chief judge of the circuit and an equal number of circuit judges and district judges of the circuit.

== Lists of members ==
=== Current members ===
Membership as of October 2026 * denotes presiding officer
Name	Title	Court
John Roberts *	Chief Justice	Supreme Court
David J. Barron	Chief Judge	First Circuit
Denise J. Casper	Chief Judge	District of Massachusetts
Raymond Lohier	Chief Judge	Second Circuit
Brenda K. Sannes	Chief Judge	Northern District of New York
Michael Chagares	Chief Judge	Third Circuit
Cathy Bissoon	Chief Judge	Western District of Pennsylvania
Albert Diaz	Chief Judge	Fourth Circuit
Joseph F. Anderson	Senior Judge	District of South Carolina
Jennifer Walker Elrod	Chief Judge	Fifth Circuit
Randy Crane	Chief Judge	Southern District of Texas
Raymond Kethledge	Chief Judge	Sixth Circuit
Hala Y. Jarbou	Chief Judge	Western District of Michigan
Michael B. Brennan	Chief Judge	Seventh Circuit
Virginia Mary Kendall	Chief Judge	Northern District of Illinois
Steven Colloton	Chief Judge	Eighth Circuit
Roberto Lange	Chief Judge	District of South Dakota
Mary H. Murguia	Chief Judge	Ninth Circuit
Jennifer Zipps	Chief Judge	District of Arizona
Jerome Holmes	Chief Judge	Tenth Circuit
Timothy D. DeGiusti	Judge	Western District of Oklahoma
William H. Pryor Jr.	Chief Judge	Eleventh Circuit
Lisa Godbey Wood	Judge	Southern District of Georgia
Sri Srinivasan	Chief Judge	District of Columbia Circuit
James Boasberg	Chief Judge	District of Columbia
Kimberly A. Moore	Chief Judge	Federal Circuit
Mark A. Barnett	Chief Judge	Court of International Trade
Nonmember Attendees: Robert J. Conrad, Conference Secretary, Director Administrative Office of the United States Courts Judge Timothy Adam Baker, Magistrate Judge Observer Chief Judge Alan S. Trust, Bankruptcy Judge Observer

=== All members ===
The following list of Judicial Conference service is organized by the circuits and courts represented. It was compiled largely from the Reports of the Proceedings of the Judicial Conference and is complete through the most recent meeting of the conference. The list contains the names of those judges who were members of the conference, but not those who may occasionally have attended in their absence. District Judges are identified by the district in which they served.

Supreme Court of the United States

William Howard Taft, 1922–1929
Charles Evans Hughes, 1929–1941
Harlan Fiske Stone, 1941–1945
Frederick Moore Vinson, 1946–1953
Hugo Lafayette Black, 1953
Earl Warren, 1954–1969
Warren E. Burger, 1969–1986
William Rehnquist, 1987–2005
John Paul Stevens, 2005
John Roberts, 2006–present

United States Court of Appeals for the First Circuit

- George H. Bingham, 1922–1938
- Scott Wilson, 1939
- Calvert Magruder, 1940–1959
- Peter Woodbury, 1959–1964
- Bailey Aldrich, 1965–1972
- Frank M. Coffin, 1972–1983
- Levin H. Campbell, 1983–1990
- Stephen G. Breyer, 1990–1994
- Juan R. Torruella, 1994–2001
- Michael Boudin, 2001–2008
- Sandra Lynch, 2008–2015
- Jeffrey R. Howard, 2015–2022
- David J. Barron, 2022–present

First Circuit District Judges

- George Clinton Sweeney (D. Mass.), 1958–1961
- Francis Ford (D. Mass.), 1961–1967
- Edward T. Gignoux (D. Me.), 1967–1973
- Andrew Caffrey (D. Mass.), 1973–1979
- Raymond J. Pettine (D.R.I.), 1979–1982
- W. Arthur Garrity Jr. (D. Mass.), 1982–1985
- Juan M. Perez-Gimenez (D.P.R.), 1985–1988
- Frank H. Freedman (D. Mass.), 1988–1991
- Francis J. Boyle (D.R.I.), 1991–1994
- Joseph L. Tauro (D. Mass.), 1995–1997
- Joseph A. DiClerico Jr. (D.N.H.), 1998–2000
- D. Brock Hornby (D. Me.), 2000–2003
- Hector M. Laffitte (D.P.R.), 2003–2006
- Ernest C. Torres (D.R.I.), 2007–2009
- Mary M. Lisi (D.R.I.), 2009
- Mark L. Wolf (D. Mass.), 2009–2012
- Paul Barbadoro (D.N.H.), 2012–2017
- Nancy Torresen (D. Me.), 2017–2021
- Gustavo Gelpí (D.P.R.), 2021
- Aida Delgado-Colón (D.P.R.), 2021–2023
- William E. Smith (D.R.I.), 2023–2026
- John J. McConnell Jr. (D.R.I.), 2026
- Denise J. Casper (D. Mass.), 2026–present

United States Court of Appeals for the Second Circuit

- Henry Wade Rogers, 1922–1925
- Charles Merrill Hough, 1926
- Martin T. Manton, 1926–1938
- Learned Hand, 1939–1951
- Thomas W. Swan, 1951–1953
- Harrie B. Chase, 1953–1954
- Charles E. Clark, 1954–1959
- J. Edward Lumbard, 1960–1971
- Henry J. Friendly, 1971–1973
- Irving R. Kaufman, 1973–1980
- Wilfred Feinberg, 1980–1988
- James L. Oakes, 1989–1992
- Thomas J. Meskill, 1992–1993
- Jon O. Newman, 1993–1997
- Ralph K. Winter Jr., 1997–2000
- John M. Walker Jr., 2000–2006
- Dennis G. Jacobs, 2006–2013
- Robert A. Katzmann, 2013–2020
- Debra Ann Livingston, 2020–2026
- Raymond Lohier, 2026–present

Second Circuit District Judges

- Edward Jordan Dimock (S.D.N.Y.), 1958–1959
- Sylvester J. Ryan (S.D.N.Y.), 1959–1968
- Sidney Sugarman (S.D.N.Y.), 1968–1971
- David N. Edelstein (S.D.N.Y.), 1971–1974
- Jacob Mishler (E.D.N.Y.), 1974–1977
- T. Emmet Clarie (D. Conn.), 1977–1980
- Lloyd F. MacMahon (S.D.N.Y.), 1980–1982
- Constance B. Motley (S.D.N.Y.), 1982–1983
- Jack B. Weinstein (E.D.N.Y.), 1983–1986
- John T. Curtin (W.D.N.Y.), 1986–1989
- Charles L. Brieant (S.D.N.Y.), 1989–1995
- Peter Dorsey (D. Conn.), 1996–1998
- Charles P. Sifton (E.D.N.Y)., 1998–2001
- Frederick Scullin (N.D.N.Y.), 2001–2004
- Michael B. Mukasey (S.D.N.Y.), 2005–2006
- Kimba M. Wood (S.D.N.Y.), 2006–2007
- William K. Sessions III (D. Vt.), 2007–2010
- Raymond J. Dearie (E.D.N.Y.), 2010–2011
- Carol Amon (E.D.N.Y.), 2011–2013
- William M. Skretny (W.D.N.Y.), 2013–2016
- Colleen McMahon (S.D.N.Y.), 2016–2020
- Stefan R. Underhill (D. Conn.), 2020–2023
- Margo Kitsy Brodie (E.D.N.Y.), 2023–2026
- Brenda K. Sannes (N.D.N.Y.), 2026–present

United States Court of Appeals for the Third Circuit

- Joseph Buffington, 1922–1937
- John Warren Davis, 1938
- John Biggs Jr., 1939–1965
- Harry E. Kalodner, 1966
- Austin Staley, 1966–1967
- William H. Hastie, 1968–1971
- Collins J. Seitz, 1971–1984
- Ruggero J. Aldisert, 1984–1986
- John J. Gibbons, 1987–1989
- A. Leon Higginbotham, 1990
- Dolores Sloviter, 1991–1997
- Edward R. Becker, 1998–2003
- Anthony J. Scirica, 2003–2010
- Theodore A. McKee, 2010–2016
- D. Brooks Smith, 2016–2021
- Michael Chagares, 2021–present

Third Circuit District Judges

- Phillip Forman (D.N.J.), 1957–1959
- James Cullen Ganey (E.D. Pa.), 1959–1961
- Thomas M. Madden (D.N.J.), 1961–1966
- Thomas James Clary (E.D. Pa.), 1966–1968
- Wallace S. Gourley (W.D. Pa.), 1968–1970
- Caleb M. Wright (D. Del.), 1970–1972
- Michael Henry Sheridan (M.D. Pa.), 1972–1975
- Lawrence A. Whipple (D.N.J.), 1975–1978
- Alfred Leopold Luongo (E.D. Pa.), 1978–1981
- Gerald J. Weber (W.D. Pa.), 1981–1984
- Walter K. Stapleton (D. Del.), 1984–1985
- Murray M. Schwartz (D. Del.), 1985–1987
- William J. Nealon (M.D. Pa.), 1987–1990
- John F. Gerry (D.N.J.), 1990–1994
- Edward N. Cahn (E.D. Pa.), 1994–1997
- Donald E. Ziegler (W.D. Pa.), 1998–2000
- Sue L. Robinson (D. Del.), 2000–2003
- Thomas I. Vanaskie (M.D. Pa.), 2003–2005
- Garrett E. Brown Jr. (D.N.J.), 2005–2008
- Harvey Bartle III (E.D. Pa.), 2008–2011
- Gary L. Lancaster (W.D. Pa.), 2011–2013
- Joy Flowers Conti (W.D. Pa.), 2013–2015
- Leonard P. Stark (D. Del.), 2015–2017
- Christopher C. Conner (M.D. Pa.), 2017–2021
- Freda L. Wolfson, (D.N.J.), 2021–2023
- Renée Marie Bumb, (D.N.J.), 2023
- Juan Ramon Sánchez, (E.D. Pa.), 2023–2024
- Mitchell S. Goldberg, (E.D. Pa.), 2024–2025
- Wendy Beetlestone, (E.D. Pa.), 2026
- Cathy Bissoon, (W.D. Pa.), 2026–present

United States Court of Appeals for the Fourth Circuit

- Charles Albert Woods, 1922–1924
- Edmund Waddill Jr., 1925–1930
- John Johnston Parker, 1931–1957
- Simon E. Sobeloff, 1958–1964
- Clement F. Haynsworth, 1964–1981
- Harrison L. Winter, 1981–1989
- Sam J. Ervin III, 1989–1995
- J. Harvie Wilkinson III, 1996–2003
- William W. Wilkins, 2003–2007
- Karen J. Williams, 2007–2009
- William B. Traxler Jr., 2009–2016
- Roger Gregory, 2016–2023
- Albert Diaz, 2023–present

Fourth Circuit District Judges

- Roszel C. Thomsen (D. Md.), 1958–1964
- Walter E. Hoffman (E.D. Va.), 1964–1970
- Oren R. Lewis (E.D. Va.), 1970–1973
- Charles E. Simons (D.S.C.), 1973–1979
- Robert R. Merhige (E.D. Va.), 1980–1985
- Frank Kaufman (D. Md.), 1985–1991
- W. Earl Britt (E.D.N.C.), 1991–1997
- Charles H. Haden II (S.D. W. Va.), 1998–2002
- David C. Norton (D.S.C.), 2003–2007
- James P. Jones (W.D. Va.), 2007–2011
- Deborah K. Chasanow (D. Md.), 2011–2016
- Robert J. Conrad, (W.D.N.C.), 2016–2021
- John P. Bailey (N.D. W. Va.), 2021–2026
- Joseph F. Anderson (D.S.C.), 2026–present

United States Court of Appeals for the Fifth Circuit

- Richard Wilde Walker Jr., 1922–1929
- Nathan Philemon Bryan, 1930–1934
- Rufus Edward Foster, 1935–1941
- Samuel Hale Sibley, 1942–1947
- Joseph Chappell Hutcheson Jr., 1948–1959
- Richard Taylor Rives, 1959–1960
- Elbert Parr Tuttle, 1961–1967
- John R. Brown, 1967–1979
- James P. Coleman, 1980
- John Cooper Godbold, 1981
- Charles Clark, 1982–1991
- Henry A. Politz, 1992–1998
- Carolyn Dineen King, 1999–2006
- Edith Hollan Jones, 2006–2012
- Carl E. Stewart, 2012–2019
- Priscilla Richman, 2019–2024
- Jennifer Walker Elrod, 2024–present

Fifth Circuit District Judges

- Seybourn Harris Lynne (N.D. Ala.), 1958–1959
- Ben Clarkson Connally (S.D. Tex.), 1959–1962
- John Milton Bryan Simpson (M.D. Fla.), 1962–1965
- Herbert William Christenberry (E.D. La.), 1965–1968
- G. Harrold Carswell (N.D. Fla.), 1968–1969
- Joe Ewing Estes (N.D. Tex.), 1969–1971
- E. Gordon West (E.D. & M.D. La.), 1971–1974
- Alexander Lawrence (S.D. Ga.), 1974–1977
- William C. Keady (N.D. Miss.), 1977–1980
- John V. Singleton (S.D. Tex.), 1980–1983
- Adrian G. Duplantier (E.D. La.), 1983–1986
- Lyonel Thomas Senter Jr. (N.D. Miss.), 1986–1989
- Barefoot Sanders (N.D. Tex.), 1989–1992
- Morey L. Sear (E.D. La.), 1992–1995
- William H. Barbour Jr. (S.D. Miss.), 1996–1998
- Hayden Wilson Head Jr. (S.D. Tex.), 1999–2001
- Martin L. C. Feldman (E.D. La.), 2001–2004
- Glen H. Davidson (N.D. Miss.), 2005–2007
- Sim Lake III (S.D. Tex.), 2007–2010
- Sarah S. Vance (E.D. La.), 2010–2013
- Louis Guirola Jr. (S.D. Miss.), 2013–2016
- Lee H. Rosenthal (S.D. Tex.), 2016–2020
- S. Maurice Hicks Jr. (W.D. La.), 2020–2023
- Debra M. Brown (N.D. Miss.), 2023–2026
- Randy Crane (S.D. Tex.), 2026–present

United States Court of Appeals for the Sixth Circuit

- Loyal Edwin Knappen, 1922–1923
- Arthur C. Denison, 1924–1931
- Charles H. Moorman, 1932–1937
- Xenophon Hicks, 1938–1951
- Charles Casper Simons, 1952–1958
- Florence E. Allen, 1958
- John Donelson Martin, Sr., 1959
- Thomas Francis McAllister, 1959–1960
- Shackelford Miller Jr., 1961–1962
- Lester LeFevre Cecil, 1962–1963
- Paul C. Weick, 1964–1969
- Harry P. Phillips, 1969–1978
- George Clifton Edwards Jr., 1979–1983
- Pierce Lively, 1984–1988
- Albert J. Engel, 1988–1989
- Gilbert S. Merritt, 1990–1996
- Boyce F. Martin Jr., 1997–2003
- Danny J. Boggs, 2003–2009
- Alice M. Batchelder, 2009–2014
- R. Guy Cole Jr., 2014–2021
- Jeffrey Sutton, 2021–2026
- Raymond Kethledge, 2026–present

Sixth Circuit District Judges

- Paul J. Jones (N.D. Ohio), 1958–1960
- Marion Speed Boyd (W.D. Tenn.), 1960–1963
- Ralph McKenzie Freeman (E.D. Mich.), 1963–1966
- Mac Swinford (E.D. & W.D. Ky.), 1966–1969
- Carl A. Weinman (S.D. Ohio), 1969–1972
- Robert Love Taylor (judge) (E.D. Tenn.), 1972–1975
- Damon J. Keith (E.D. Mich.), 1975–1978
- Charles M. Allen (W.D. Ky.), 1978–1981
- Frank J. Battisti (N.D. Ohio), 1981–1984
- Robert Malcolm McRae Jr. (W.D. Tenn.), 1984–1987
- Philip Pratt (E.D. Mich.), 1987–1989
- James P. Churchill (E.D. Mich.), 1989–1990
- Eugene Siler (E.D. & W.D. Ky.), 1990–1991
- Edward Johnstone (W.D. Ky.), 1991–1993
- Thomas Lambros (N.D. Ohio), 1993–1994
- John D. Holschuh (S.D. Ohio), 1995
- S. Arthur Spiegel (S.D. Ohio), 1995–1996
- Thomas A. Wiseman Jr. (M.D. Tenn.), 1997–2001
- Lawrence P. Zatkoff (E.D. Mich.), 2001–2004
- William Bertelsman (E.D. Ky.), 2005–2006
- Charles R. Simpson III (W.D. Ky.), 2006–2007
- Thomas M. Rose (S.D. Ohio), 2007–2009
- Solomon Oliver Jr. (N.D. Ohio), 2009–2010
- Thomas A. Varlan (E.D. Tenn.), 2010–2013
- Paul Lewis Maloney (W.D. Mich.), 2013–2016
- Joseph Martin Hood (E.D. Ky.), 2016–2019
- Thomas B. Russell (W.D. Ky.), 2019–2020
- Michael H. Watson (S.D. Ohio), 2020–2021
- Sara Elizabeth Lioi (N.D. Ohio), 2021–2023
- S. Thomas Anderson (W.D. Tenn.), 2023–2026
- Hala Y. Jarbou (W.D. Mich.), 2026–present

United States Court of Appeals for the Seventh Circuit

- Francis E. Baker, 1922–1923
- Samuel Alschuler, 1924–1934
- Evan A. Evans, 1935–1947
- William Morris Sparks, 1948
- James Earl Major, 1949–1954
- Francis Ryan Duffy, 1954–1959
- John S. Hastings, 1959–1968
- Latham Castle, 1968–1969
- Luther M. Swygert, 1970–1974
- Thomas E. Fairchild, 1975–1981
- Walter J. Cummings, 1981–1986
- William J. Bauer, 1987–1993
- Richard A. Posner, 1994–2000
- Joel M. Flaum, 2000–2006
- Frank H. Easterbrook, 2006–2013
- Diane Pamela Wood, 2013–2020
- Diane S. Sykes, 2020–2026
- Michael B. Brennan, 2026–present

Seventh Circuit District Judges

- William Joseph Campbell (N.D. Ill.), 1958–1961
- Luther M. Swygert (N.D. Ind.), 1961
- William E. Steckler (S.D. Ind.), 1962–1964
- Kenneth P. Grubb (E.D. Wis), 1964–1965
- Edwin A. Robson (N.D. Ill.), 1966–1969
- Robert A. Grant (N.D. Ind.), 1969–1972
- James Edward Doyle (W.D. Wis.), 1972–1975
- James B. Parsons (N.D. Ill.), 1975–1978
- S. Hugh Dillin (S.D. Ind.), 1979–1982
- John W. Reynolds (E.D. Wis.), 1982–1985
- Frank J. McGarr (N.D. Ill.), 1985–1987
- Sarah Evans Barker (S.D. Ind.), 1988–1991
- Barbara Crabb (W.D. Wis.), 1991–1994
- Michael M. Mihm (C.D. Ill.), 1995–1997
- Robert Lowell Miller Jr. (N.D. Ind.), 1998–2000
- Marvin Aspen (N.D. Ill.), 2000–2003
- J.P. Stadtmueller (E.D. Wis.), 2003–2006
- Wayne Andersen (N.D. Ill.), 2006–2009
- Richard L. Young (S.D. Ind.), 2009–2012
- Rubén Castillo (N.D. Ill.), 2012–2016
- Michael Joseph Reagan (S.D. Ill.), 2016–2019
- Rebecca R. Pallmeyer (N.D. Ill.), 2019–2021
- Jon DeGuilio (N.D. Ind.), 2021–2024
- Virginia Mary Kendall (N.D. Ill.), 2024–present

United States Court of Appeals for the Eighth Circuit

- Walter Henry Sanborn, 1922–1926
- Kimbrough Stone, 1927–1947
- Archibald K. Gardner, 1947–1959
- Harvey M. Johnsen, 1959–1965
- Charles Joseph Vogel, 1965–1967
- Martin D. Van Oosterhout, 1968–1970
- Marion C. Matthes, 1970–1973
- Pat Mehaffy, 1973–1974
- Floyd R. Gibson, 1974–1979
- Donald P. Lay, 1980–1991
- Richard Arnold, 1992–1998
- Pasco M. Bowman II, 1998–1999
- Roger L. Wollman, 1999–2002
- David R. Hansen, 2002–2003
- James B. Loken, 2003–2010
- William J. Riley, 2010–2017
- Lavenski Smith, 2017–2024
- Steven Colloton, 2024–present

Eighth Circuit District Judges

- Gunnar Hans Nordbye (D. Minn.), 1958–1962
- John Elvis Miller (W.D. Ark.), 1962–1963
- Richard M. Duncan (E.D. & W.D. Mo.), 1963–1965
- Roy W. Harper (E.D. & W.D. Mo.), 1965–1971
- Oren Harris (E.D. & W.D. Ark.), 1971–1974
- James H. Meredith (E.D. Mo.), 1974–1979
- Albert G. Schatz (D. Neb.), 1979–1985
- John F. Nangle (E.D. Mo.), 1985–1990
- Donald E. O'Brien (N.D. & S.D. Iowa), 1991–1997
- James M. Rosenbaum (D. Minn.), 1998–2005
- Lawrence L. Piersol (D.S.D.), 2006–2009
- Rodney W. Sippel (E.D. Mo.), 2009–2015
- Karen E. Schreier (D.S.D.), 2015–2016
- Linda R. Reade (N.D. Iowa), 2016–2021
- John R. Tunheim (D. Minn.), 2021–2024
- Roberto Lange (D.S.D.), 2024–present

United States Court of Appeals for the Ninth Circuit

- William Ball Gilbert, 1922–1930
- Curtis Dwight Wilbur, 1931–1944
- Francis Arthur Garrecht, 1945–1947
- William Denman, 1948–1957
- Albert Lee Stephens, 1957–1958
- Walter Lyndon Pope, 1959
- Richard H. Chambers, 1959–1976
- James R. Browning, 1976–1988
- Alfred T. Goodwin, 1988–1990
- J. Clifford Wallace, 1991–1995
- Procter Ralph Hug Jr., 1996–2000
- Mary M. Schroeder, 2001–2007
- Alex Kozinski, 2007–2014
- Sidney R. Thomas, 2014–2021
- Mary H. Murguia, 2021–present

Ninth Circuit District Judges

- William C. Mathes (S.D. Cal.), 1958–1960
- William J. Lindberg (E.D. & W.D. Wash.), 1960–1963
- Gus J. Solomon (D. Ore.), 1963–1965
- Albert Wollenberg (N.D. Cal.), 1966–1969
- Fred M. Taylor (D. Idaho), 1969–1972
- Jesse W. Curtis (C.D. Cal.), 1972–1975
- Thomas J. MacBride (E.D. Cal.), 1975–1978
- Morell Sharp (W.D. Wash.), 1978–1980
- Raymond Clyne McNichols (D. Idaho), 1980–1981
- Manuel L. Real (C.D. Cal.), 1981–1984
- Robert J. McNichols (E.D. Wash.), 1984–1987
- Robert F. Peckham (N.D. Cal.), 1987–1990
- William D. Browning (D. Ariz.), 1990–1993
- William Matthew Byrne Jr. (C.D. Cal.), 1993–1996
- Lloyd D. George (D. Nev.), 1997–1999
- Judith N. Keep (S.D. Cal.), 1999–2003
- David Alan Ezra (D. Haw.), 2003–2005
- Charles R. Breyer (N.D. Cal.), 2006–2010
- Robert S. Lasnik (W.D. Wash.), 2010–2016
- Claudia Ann Wilken (N.D. Cal.), 2016–2019
- Rosanna M. Peterson (E.D. Wash), 2019–2021
- Leslie E. Kobayashi (D. Haw.), 2021–2026
- Jennifer Zipps (D. Ariz), 2026–present

United States Court of Appeals for the Tenth Circuit

- Robert E. Lewis, 1929–1940
- Orie Leon Phillips, 1940–1955
- Sam Gilbert Bratton, 1956–1959
- Alfred P. Murrah, 1959–1970
- David T. Lewis, 1970–1977
- Oliver Seth, 1978–1984
- William Judson Holloway Jr., 1984–1991
- Monroe McKay, 1991–1993
- Stephanie K. Seymour, 1994–2000
- Deanell R. Tacha, 2001–2007
- Robert H. Henry, 2008–2010
- Mary Beck Briscoe, 2010–2015
- Timothy Tymkovich, 2015–2022
- Jerome Holmes, 2022–present

Tenth Circuit District Judges

- Eugene Rice (E.D. Okla.), 1958
- Royce H. Savage (N.D. Okla.), 1958–1961
- Ewing Thomas Kerr (D. Wyo.), 1962–1964
- Alfred A. Arraj (D. Colo.), 1964–1967
- Arthur Jehu Stanley Jr. (D. Kan.), 1967–1970
- Olin Hatfield Chilson (D. Colo.), 1970–1973
- Frederick A. Daugherty (E.D., N.D., & W.D. Okla.), 1973–1976
- Wesley E. Brown (D. Kan.), 1976–1979
- Howard C. Bratton (D.N.M.), 1979–1982
- Luther B. Eubanks (W.D. Okla.), 1982–1985
- Sherman G. Finesilver (D. Colo.), 1985–1988
- Earl E. O'Connor (D. Kan.), 1988–1991
- Richard P. Matsch (D. Colo.), 1991–1994
- Clarence A. Brimmer (D. Wyo.), 1994–1997
- Ralph G. Thompson (W.D. Okla.), 1998–2000
- Frank Howell Seay (E.D. Okla.), 2000–2003
- David L. Russell (W.D. Okla.), 2003–2006
- Alan B. Johnson (D. Wyo.), 2006–2009
- Robin J. Cauthron (W.D. Okla.), 2009–2012
- Dee Benson (D. Utah), 2012–2016
- Martha Vázquez (D.N.M.), 2016–2019
- Claire Eagan (N.D. Okla.), 2019–2023
- William P. Johnson (D.N.M.), 2023–2026
- Timothy D. DeGiusti (W.D. Okla.), 2026–present

United States Court of Appeals for the Eleventh Circuit

- John C. Godbold, 1982–1986
- Paul H. Roney, 1986–1989
- Gerald B. Tjoflat, 1990–1996
- Joseph W. Hatchett, 1997–1999
- R. Lanier Anderson III, 1999–2002
- J. L. Edmondson, 2002–2009
- Joel F. Dubina, 2009–2013
- Ed Carnes, 2013–2020
- William H. Pryor Jr., 2020–present

Eleventh Circuit District Judges

- William Clark O'Kelley (N.D. Ga.), 1982–1984
- James Lawrence King (S.D. Fla.), 1984–1987
- Sam C. Pointer (N.D. Ala.), 1987–1990
- Anthony Alaimo (S.D. Ga.), 1990–1993
- William Terrell Hodges (M.D. Fla.), 1994–1999
- Charles Randolph Butler Jr. (S.D. Ala.), 1999–2003
- J. Owen Forrester (N.D. Ga.), 2003–2005
- Robert L. Hinkle (N.D. Fla.), 2006–2007
- Myron H. Thompson (M.D. Ala.), 2007–2011
- W. Louis Sands (M.D. Ga.), 2011–2015
- Federico A. Moreno (S.D. Fla.), 2015–2020
- L. Scott Coogler (N.D. Ala.), 2020–2024
- Lisa Godbey Wood (S.D. Ga.), 2024–present

United States Court of Appeals for the District of Columbia Circuit

- Duncan Lawrence Groner, 1938–1947
- Harold Montelle Stephens, 1948–1955
- Henry White Edgerton, 1955–1958
- E. Barrett Prettyman, 1959–1960
- Wilbur Kingsbury Miller, 1961–1962
- David L. Bazelon, 1963–1977
- J. Skelly Wright, 1978–1980
- Carl McGowan, 1981
- Spottswood W. Robinson III, 1981–1986
- Patricia M. Wald, 1986–1990
- Abner Mikva, 1991–1994
- Harry T. Edwards, 1994–2001
- Douglas H. Ginsburg, 2001–2008
- David B. Sentelle, 2008–2013
- Merrick B. Garland, 2013–2020
- Sri Srinivasan, 2020–present

D.C. Circuit District Judges

- Bolitha Laws (D.D.C.), 1958
- David Andrew Pine (D.D.C.), 1959–1961
- Matthew F. McGuire (D.D.C.), 1961–1967
- Edward M. Curran (D.D.C.), 1968–1971
- John J. Sirica (D.D.C.), 1971–1974
- George L. Hart (D.D.C.), 1974–1975
- William Blakely Jones (D.D.C.), 1975–1977
- William B. Bryant (D.D.C.), 1977–1981
- John Lewis Smith (D.D.C.), 1981–1982
- Aubrey E. Robinson Jr. (D.D.C.), 1982–1992
- John Garrett Penn (D.D.C.), 1992–1997
- Norma Holloway Johnson (D.D.C.), 1997–2001
- Thomas F. Hogan (D.D.C.), 2001–2008
- Royce C. Lamberth (D.D.C.), 2008–2013
- Richard W. Roberts (D.D.C.), 2013–2016
- Beryl A. Howell (D.D.C.), 2016–2023
- James Boasberg (D.D.C.), 2023–present

United States Court of Appeals for the Federal Circuit

- Howard T. Markey, 1983–1990
- Helen W. Nies, 1990–1994
- Glenn L. Archer Jr., 1994–1997
- Haldane Robert Mayer, 1998–2004
- Paul R. Michel, 2004–2010
- Randall R. Rader, 2010–2014
- Sharon Prost, 2014–2021
- Kimberly A. Moore, 2021–present

United States Court of Federal Claims

(prior to merger of the appellate division into the Federal Circuit)

- Marvin Jones, 1956–1964
- Wilson Cowen, 1964–1976
- Oscar H. Davis, 1977–1978
- Daniel M. Friedman, 1978–1982

United States Court of Customs and Patent Appeals

(prior to merger into the Federal Circuit)

- Eugene Worley, 1961–1972
- Howard T. Markey, 1972–1982

United States Court of International Trade

- Edward D. Re, 1990–1991
- Gregory Carman, 1991
- Dominick L. DiCarlo, 1992–1996
- Gregory W. Carman, 1997–2003
- Jane A. Restani, 2003–2010
- Donald C. Pogue, 2010–2014
- Timothy C. Stanceu, 2014–2021
- Mark A. Barnett, 2021–present

== See also ==
- Judicial Council of California
- New York State Commission on Judicial Conduct
- Canadian Judicial Council
- Council of the judiciary (for similar bodies in other jurisdictions)
- Judicial Council (disambiguation page)
