= Paul L. Caron =

American law professor

Paul L. Caron is an American lawyer and professor who has been the Duane and Kelly Roberts Dean of the Pepperdine University Rick J. Caruso School of Law since 2017.

== Biography ==
Caron obtained an A.B. from Georgetown University in 1979, graduating magna cum laude. He then earned a J.D. from Cornell Law School in 1983, also graduating with cum laude honors. Later, in 1988, he received an LL.M. from Boston University.

Caron joined Pepperdine University in 2013, served as Associate Dean for Research and Faculty Development from 2015 to 2017, and was appointed the Duane and Kelly Roberts Dean of the Caruso School of Law in 2017, succeeding Deanell Reece Tacha. Prior to Pepperdine, he was a professor and an associate dean at the University of Cincinnati College of Law for twenty-three years.

Caron is the editor of three tax journals for the Social Science Research Network (SSRN). He is also the publisher and editor of the TaxProf Blog, which he founded in 2004. He also owns and publishes the Law Professor Blogs Network.
