= Robert E. Bacharach =

American judge (born 1959)

Robert Bacharach
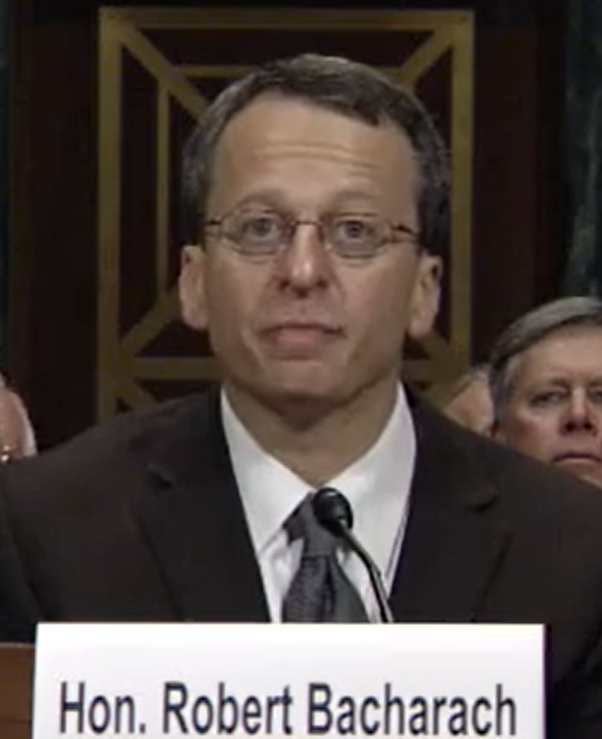

Judge of the United States Court of Appeals for the Tenth Circuit
- Incumbent
- Assumed office February 28, 2013
- Appointed by: Barack Obama
- Preceded by: Robert Harlan Henry

Personal details
- Born: Robert Edwin Bacharach; May 20, 1959 (age 66) Clarksdale, Mississippi, U.S.
- Education: University of Oklahoma (BA); Washington University (JD)

Robert Edwin Bacharach (born May 20, 1959) is a United States circuit judge of the United States Court of Appeals for the Tenth Circuit.

== Early life and career ==
Bacharach was born in Clarksdale, Mississippi. He attended Washington University in St. Louis for one year and received his Bachelor of Arts degree, magna cum laude, from the University of Oklahoma in 1981. He received his Juris Doctor from the Washington University School of Law in 1985 where he graduated Order of the Coif. He served as an editor of the Washington University Law Quarterly. He served two years as law clerk to Judge William Judson Holloway Jr. of the United States Court of Appeals for the Tenth Circuit. In 1987, he joined the Oklahoma City law firm of Crowe & Dunlevy, P.C. as an associate, becoming a shareholder in 1994. His concentration was commercial litigation. He served as an adjunct professor at the University of Oklahoma College of Law, teaching civil pretrial litigation.

== Federal judicial service ==
=== United States magistrate judge service ===
Bacharach was appointed United States magistrate judge of the United States District Court for the Western District of Oklahoma in 1999, holding that office until his elevation to circuit judge in 2013. He is an active member of the Federal Bar Association and has served as the Tenth Circuit Vice President since 2007. During his time as a magistrate judge, he handled nearly 3,000 civil and criminal cases and presided over more than 400 judicial settlement conferences. He issued more than 1,600 reports and recommendations in a wide variety of judicial matters. He chaired numerous committees for his district, including the Civil Rules Committee and the Criminal Justice Act Committee.

=== United States court of appeals service ===
On January 23, 2012, President Barack Obama nominated Bacharach to be United States Circuit Judge for the United States Court of Appeals for the Tenth Circuit. On July 26, 2012, Senate Majority Leader Harry Reid filed for cloture on Bacharach's nomination. A cloture vote held on July 30, 2012, failed by a 56–34 vote, with 3 senators voted present, including both Oklahoma Senators, Tom Coburn and James Inhofe. On January 2, 2013, his nomination was returned to the President, due to the sine die adjournment of the Senate.

On January 3, 2013, he was renominated to the same office. On February 7, 2013, the Senate Judiciary Committee reported his nomination to the floor by voice vote. The Senate confirmed his nomination on February 25, 2013, by a 93–0 vote. He received his commission on February 28, 2013.

== See also ==
- Barack Obama judicial appointment controversies

Legal offices
Preceded by Robert Harlan Henry	Judge of the United States Court of Appeals for the Tenth Circuit; 2013–present	Incumbent
