= Alfred P. Murrah =

American federal judge (1904–1975)

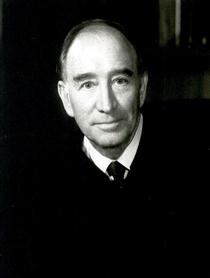

Senior Judge of the United States Court of Appeals for the Tenth Circuit
- In office May 1, 1970 – October 30, 1975

Chief Judge of the United States Court of Appeals for the Tenth Circuit
- In office August 7, 1959 – May 1, 1970
- Preceded by: Sam G. Bratton
- Succeeded by: David Thomas Lewis

Judge of the United States Court of Appeals for the Tenth Circuit
- In office September 4, 1940 – May 1, 1970
- Appointed by: Franklin D. Roosevelt
- Preceded by: Robert E. Lewis
- Succeeded by: William Edward Doyle

Judge of the United States District Court for the Eastern District of Oklahoma Judge of the United States District Court for the Northern District of Oklahoma Judge of the United States District Court for the Western District of Oklahoma
- In office March 3, 1937 – September 9, 1940
- Appointed by: Franklin D. Roosevelt
- Preceded by: Seat established by 49 Stat. 1804
- Succeeded by: Bower Slack Broaddus

Personal details
- Born: Alfred Paul Murrah; October 27, 1904 Tishomingo, Indian Territory
- Died: October 30, 1975 (aged 71) Oklahoma City, Oklahoma, U.S.
- Education: University of Oklahoma College of Law (LLB)

Alfred Paul Murrah (October 27, 1904 – October 30, 1975) was a United States circuit judge of the United States Court of Appeals for the Tenth Circuit and previously was a United States district judge of the United States District Court for the Eastern District of Oklahoma, the United States District Court for the Northern District of Oklahoma and the United States District Court for the Western District of Oklahoma.

== Education and career ==
Born on October 27, 1904, in Tishomingo, Indian Territory (Oklahoma), Murrah received a Bachelor of Laws in 1928 from the University of Oklahoma College of Law. He entered private practice in Oklahoma City, Oklahoma from 1928 to 1929, then continued his practice in Seminole, Oklahoma and Oklahoma City from 1929 to 1937.

== Federal judicial service ==
Murrah was nominated by President Franklin D. Roosevelt on February 8, 1937, to the United States District Court for the Eastern District of Oklahoma, the United States District Court for the Northern District of Oklahoma and the United States District Court for the Western District of Oklahoma, to a new joint seat authorized by 49 Stat. 1804. He was confirmed by the United States Senate on February 25, 1937, and received his commission on March 3, 1937. His service terminated on September 9, 1940, due to his elevation to the Tenth Circuit.

Murrah was nominated by President Roosevelt on August 5, 1940, to a seat on the United States Court of Appeals for the Tenth Circuit vacated by Judge Robert E. Lewis. He was confirmed by the Senate on August 29, 1940, and received his commission on September 4, 1940. He served as Chief Judge and as a member of the Judicial Conference of the United States from August 7, 1959 to May 1, 1970. He served as the Chair of the Judicial Panel on Multidistrict Litigation from 1968 to 1975. He assumed senior status on May 1, 1970. He was the last appeals court judge who continued to serve in active service appointed by President Roosevelt. He served as Director of the Federal Judicial Center from 1970 to 1974. His service terminated on October 30, 1975, due to his death in Oklahoma City.

== Federal building ==
Murrah was the namesake of the Alfred P. Murrah Federal Building, a federal office complex which was destroyed in the Oklahoma City bombing on April 19, 1995.

== See also ==
- List of United States federal judges by longevity of service

== Sources ==
- Franks, Kenny Arthur; Bob Burke; Odie B. Faulk; Von Russell Creel (1996). American Jurist: The Life of Judge Alfred P. Murrah. Oklahoma Heritage Association. ISBN 978-0-86546-090-4.

Legal offices
Preceded by Seat established by 49 Stat. 1804	Judge of the United States District Court for the Eastern District of Oklahoma; Judge of the United States District Court for the Northern District of Oklahoma; Judge of the United States District Court for the Western District of Oklahoma; 1937–1940	Succeeded by Bower Slack Broaddus
Preceded by Robert E. Lewis	Judge of the United States Court of Appeals for the Tenth Circuit; 1940–1970	Succeeded by William Edward Doyle
Preceded by Sam G. Bratton	Chief Judge of the United States Court of Appeals for the Tenth Circuit; 1959–1970	Succeeded by David Thomas Lewis
