= Michael R. Murphy =

American judge (born 1947)

Michael Murphy

Senior Judge of the United States Court of Appeals for the Tenth Circuit
- Incumbent
- Assumed office December 31, 2012

Judge of the United States Court of Appeals for the Tenth Circuit
- In office August 14, 1995 – December 31, 2012
- Appointed by: Bill Clinton
- Preceded by: Monroe G. McKay
- Succeeded by: Carolyn B. McHugh

Personal details
- Born: Michael Roland Murphy; August 6, 1947 (age 78) Denver, Colorado, U.S.
- Education: Creighton University (BA); University of Wyoming (JD)

Michael Roland Murphy (born August 6, 1947) is a Senior United States circuit judge of the United States Court of Appeals for the Tenth Circuit.

== Early life and education ==
Murphy was born in Denver, Colorado in 1947. His family later moved to a small town in Wyoming. In 1955, he began playing little league baseball and discovered his lifelong hero, Roberto Clemente. At 13, his mother sent him to a boarding school in Kansas so he could get a good education.

He received his Bachelor of Arts degree from Creighton University in 1969. In 1972, he earned his Juris Doctor from the University of Wyoming College of Law. He graduated with honors and was the Editor-in-Chief of the Law Review.

== Legal career ==
After law school, he clerked for Judge David Thomas Lewis of the United States Court of Appeals for the Tenth Circuit from 1972 to 1973. Upon completion of his clerkship, he entered private practice in Salt Lake City, Utah with Jones, Waldo, Holbrook & McDonough.

Six months into his job, he was arguing a 10-week antitrust case, which resulted in a favorable jury verdict. Murphy stayed with the firm from 1973-85. In 1986, he was appointed to a judgeship of the Third District Court of Utah.

== Judicial career ==
In 1986, Governor Norman Bangerter appointed him a judge of the Third District Court of Utah. In 1990, he became the presiding judge of that court, where he remained until his appointment to the Tenth Circuit in 1995.

During his tenure in the Third District Court of Utah, Murphy helped to build a court complex adjacent to the Salt Lake City/County Building. He served on the Utah Judicial Council Task Force on Alternative Dispute Resolution and chaired the Judicial Oversight Committee in Child Support Guidelines in 1988 as well as chairing the State Advisory Committee on Child Support Guidelines. Additionally, he served on the Utah Sentencing Guidelines Task Force in 1991 and the Utah State Sentencing Commission.

On July 25, 1995, Murphy was nominated by President Bill Clinton for a vacancy on the bench for the United States Court of Appeals for the Tenth Circuit. The seat was vacated by Judge Monroe G. McKay. Murphy was confirmed by the senate on August 11, 1995, and received commission on August 14, 1995. He assumed senior status on December 31, 2012.

== Awards, committees, commissions, professional associations and memberships ==
=== Awards ===
- Freedom of Information Award, Society of Professional Journalists, 1989
- Judge of the Year, Utah State Bar, 1992
- Utah Minority Bar Association Award, 1995
- Creighton University Alumni Achievement Citation, 1997

=== Committees and commissions ===
- Utah Sentencing Commission, 1993–1995, Member
- Third District Committee on Court Reorganization, 1992–1995, Chair
- Judicial Council Task Force on Alternative Dispute Resolution, 1986–1988, Member
- Utah Supreme Court Advisory Committee on Rules of Civil Procedure, 1984–1995, Member
- Salt Lake County Bar Association, 1989–1992, Member, Executive Committee
- Legislative Advisory Committee on Child Support Guidelines, Member, 1987–1995; Chair, 1993-1994

=== Professional associations and memberships ===
- Sutherland Inns of Court II, 1990–1991, President
- Board of District Court Judges, 1989–1990, Member
- American Bar Association, 1973–Present, Member
- Utah State Bar, 1973–Present, Member
- Wyoming State Bar Association, 1972–Present, Member

== Selected opinions and cases presided over ==
=== Cases presided over ===
==== United States of America v. Timothy James McVeigh, 153 F.3d 1166 (10th Cir. 1998) ====
Murphy did not author this opinion, but sat on the panel of judges who heard the appeal. The Tenth District Court of Appeals upheld McVeigh's conviction and sentence. The full opinion can be found here

=== Opinions ===
==== Yes on Term Limits v. Savage, 550 F.3d 1023 (10th Cir. 2008) ====
Held: Oklahoma's ban on non-resident petition circulators violates the First Amendment.

This case was significant because it allows citizens to seek help from non-resident workers to petition the government. Without this resource, many citizens would find it difficult to make change.

==== Alto Eldorado Partnership v. County of Santa Fe, 634 F.3d 1170 (10th Cir. 2011) ====
Held: Property developer's takings claim was not ripe because developer had not utilized available state procedures to seek just compensation.

==== United States v. McCane, 573 F.3d 1037 (10th Cir. 2009) ====
Held: The good-faith exception to the exclusionary rule applies to a search justified under the settled case law of a United States Court of Appeals, even if the search is rendered unconstitutional by a subsequent Supreme Court decision.

==== In re Qwest Communications International, Inc., 450 F.3d 1179 (10th Cir. 2006) ====
Held: Corporation waived attorney-client privilege and work-product doctrine, as to third-party civil litigants, by releasing privileged materials to federal agencies in the course of the agencies' investigation of the corporation.

==== Prison Legal News v. Executive Office for United States Attorneys, 628 F.3d 1243 (10th Cir. 2011) ====
Held: The Government can invoke the Freedom of Information Act's personal privacy exemption even though it previously disclosed the records during a public trial.

==== O'Connor v. Washburn University, 416 F.3d 1216 (10th Cir. 2005) ====
Held: Plaintiffs, a student and an employee of a public university, had standing to challenge an allegedly anti-Catholic statue displayed on the grounds of the university.

== Sources ==
Legal offices
Preceded by Monroe G. McKay	Judge of the United States Court of Appeals for the Tenth Circuit; 1995–2012	Succeeded by Carolyn B. McHugh
