= Jerome Holmes =

American judge (born 1961)

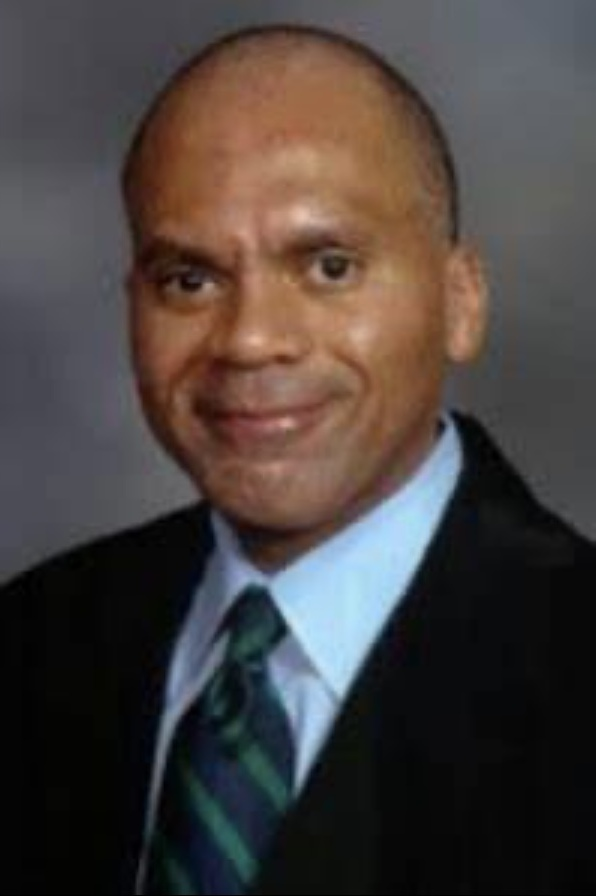

Chief Judge of the United States Court of Appeals for the Tenth Circuit
- Incumbent
- Assumed office October 1, 2022
- Preceded by: Timothy M. Tymkovich

Judge of the United States Court of Appeals for the Tenth Circuit
- Incumbent
- Assumed office August 9, 2006
- Appointed by: George W. Bush
- Preceded by: Stephanie Kulp Seymour

Personal details
- Born: November 18, 1961 (age 64) Washington, D.C., U.S.
- Education: Wake Forest University (BA); Georgetown University (JD); Harvard University (MPA)

Jerome A. Holmes (born November 18, 1961) is an American lawyer serving as the Chief United States circuit judge of the United States Court of Appeals for the Tenth Circuit. He is the first African American to serve on the Tenth Circuit.

== Early life and education ==
Holmes graduated from Wake Forest University in 1983 with a Bachelor of Arts degree. He then attended the Georgetown University Law Center, where he was an editor of the Georgetown Immigration Law Journal. He graduated with a Juris Doctor in 1988.

Later in his career, Holmes studied at Harvard University's John F. Kennedy School of Government, receiving a Master of Public Administration in 2000.

== Legal career ==
Holmes began his legal career as a law clerk for judge Wayne Alley of the United States District Court for the Western District of Oklahoma from 1988 to 1990. Holmes then clerked for judge William Judson Holloway Jr. of the Tenth Circuit from 1990 to 1991.

After his clerkships, Holmes entered private practice with the law firm Steptoe & Johnson in its Washington, D.C. office. He practiced at the firm as an associate from 1991 to 1994. He then returned to Oklahoma to serve as an assistant United States attorney for the Western District of Oklahoma, where he became deputy chief of the Criminal Division. During that time, Holmes worked on the prosecution team for the Oklahoma City bombing that secured the convictions of death for Timothy McVeigh and a life sentence for Terry Nichols. In the aftermath of the September 11 terrorist attack, Holmes served for two and a half years as the Anti-Terrorism Coordinator in the Western District of Oklahoma, coordinating the federal, state, and local domestic and international terrorism initiatives until 2005. Holmes re-entered private practice in 2005 as a Director of the Oklahoma firm Crowe & Dunlevy, where his practice was focused on white collar criminal defense, complex civil litigation, and corporate law.

== Federal judicial service ==
Holmes was initially nominated for a federal judgeship in the United States District Court for the Northern District of Oklahoma, having been chosen from group of finalists that included Tulsa attorneys Lane Wilson and John M. O'Connor (Wilson would later serve as U.S. Magistrate Judge for the Northern District before leaving to become General Counsel at the Williams Companies). While his nomination for a United States District Court seat was pending, Holmes was nominated by President George W. Bush on May 4, 2006, to fill a seat vacated by Judge Stephanie Kulp Seymour. Bush's previous pick to replace Judge Seymour, United States District Judge James H. Payne, withdrew over criticism of his handling of cases in which he allegedly had a conflict of interest. The United States Senate confirmed his nomination less than three months later on July 26, 2006, by a 67–30 vote. He received his commission on August 9, 2006. He became the chief judge on October 1, 2022.

=== Notable cases ===
- Holmes' first published opinion for the court, United States v. Ahidley, was released on May 25, 2007. Holmes wrote for a unanimous three-judge panel holding that a criminal defendant was improperly ordered to pay immediate restitution to the victim of his crime.
- Holmes was on the first federal appellate court panel to weigh affirmatively on the constitutional right of same-sex couples to marry. He penned an important concurrence on the role of animus in the ban of same-sex marriage in Oklahoma.
- In 2017, Holmes found that the Indian Gaming Regulatory Act did not permit the United States Department of the Interior to force a state to participate in mediation with a tribe after the state had asserted its sovereign immunity.

== See also ==
- List of African-American federal judges
- List of African-American jurists

Legal offices
Preceded by Stephanie Kulp Seymour	Judge of the United States Court of Appeals for the Tenth Circuit; 2006–present	Incumbent
Preceded by Timothy M. Tymkovich	Chief Judge of the United States Court of Appeals for the Tenth Circuit; 2022–present	Incumbent
