= Carolyn B. McHugh =

American judge (born 1957)

Carolyn McHugh
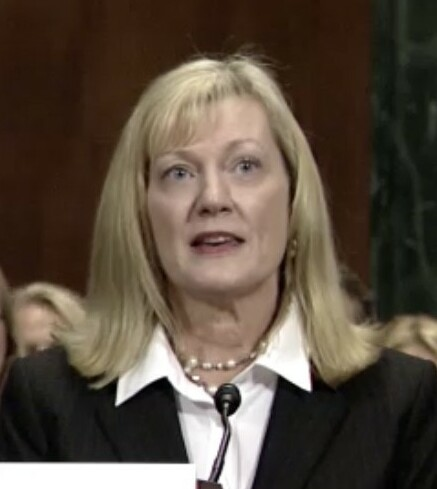
- McHugh in 2013

Judge of the United States Court of Appeals for the Tenth Circuit
- Incumbent
- Assumed office March 14, 2014
- Appointed by: Barack Obama
- Preceded by: Michael R. Murphy

Personal details
- Born: July 12, 1957 (age 68) Abington Township, Pennsylvania, U.S.
- Education: University of Utah (BA, JD)

Carolyn Baldwin McHugh (born July 12, 1957) is an American lawyer and judge who serves as a United States circuit judge of the United States Court of Appeals for the Tenth Circuit. and former Presiding Judge of the Utah Court of Appeals.

== Early life and education ==
McHugh was born in 1957, in Abington Township, Montgomery County, Pennsylvania while her parents were visiting her paternal grandparents. The family, which grew to include eight children, was living in Baltimore, Maryland at the time.

Shortly after McHugh's birth, her father was transferred to Andover, Massachusetts, and later, to Wilmington, Delaware. Then, during her freshman year of high school, the family moved again to accommodate her father's career, relocating to Salt Lake City, Utah.

In 1975, McHugh graduated from Judge Memorial Catholic High School in Salt Lake City, where she participated in sports, student government, drill team, yearbook, and other activities. McHugh was selected as the Judge Memorial Sterling Scholar of English and Literature.

McHugh continued her education at the University of Utah, where she earned her Bachelor of Arts degree, magna cum laude, in 1978. After working for a year to earn her first year of tuition, McHugh entered the S.J. Quinney College of Law at the University of Utah in 1979. She received her Juris Doctor in 1982, graduating Order of the Coif, serving as an editor of the Utah Law Review.

== Legal career ==
McHugh served as a law clerk for Judge Bruce Sterling Jenkins of the United States District Court for the District of Utah from August 1982 to August 1983. She joined the Salt Lake City law firm now known as Parr Brown Gee & Loveless as an associate in 1983 and was made a shareholder of the firm in 1987. During her private legal career, McHugh concentrated her practice in complex commercial litigation, in areas including antitrust, construction, environmental, real estate, financial lending, and title insurance. Throughout that time, McHugh also maintained an active pro bono practice, assisting persons of limited means with a variety of legal issues, including family law and minor civil matters, while also serving as a court-appointed guardian ad litem.

== Judicial career ==
=== State judicial service ===
In August 2005, McHugh was appointed to the Utah Court of Appeals by Utah Governor Jon M. Huntsman Jr. and served in that capacity until she was appointed a federal circuit judge, eventually succeeded by Kate A. Toomey. In 2010, the Chief of Justice of the Utah Supreme Court appointed McHugh to serve as a member of the Judicial Conduct Commission to fill the vacancy created when her colleague, Judge Russell Bench, retired on December 31, 2009. In 2011, McHugh was appointed as the appellate court member of the Commission on Civic and Character Education, where she served with the Lieutenant Governor, members of the Utah Legislature, and representatives of the State Board of Education. On January 1, 2012, McHugh began a two-year term as the presiding judge of the Utah Court of Appeals.

=== Federal judicial service ===
On May 16, 2013, President Barack Obama nominated McHugh to be a United States Circuit Judge of the United States Court of Appeals for the Tenth Circuit to the seat vacated by Judge Michael R. Murphy, who assumed senior status on December 31, 2012. Her nomination was approved unanimously by the Senate Judiciary Committee on January 16, 2014. On March 6, 2014, senator Harry Reid filed for cloture on her nomination. On March 10, 2014, the Senate invoked cloture on her nomination by a 62–34 vote. On March 12, 2014, McHugh was confirmed by a 98–0 vote. She received her commission on March 14, 2014.

== Select cases ==
McHugh wrote for the state court in each of the following decisions.

Birch v. Fire Insurance Exchange, 2005 UT App 395, 122 P.3d 696. Randy Birch filed a claim with Fire Insurance Exchange (Fire Exchange) for losses incurred when a fire started by neighborhood children playing with matches spread to his home. Birch's policy with Fire Exchange provided coverage for the full replacement value of the damaged property, subject to a $500 deductible. Birch and Fire Exchange agreed that the replacement value of the property was $7732.91, and Fire Exchange paid Birch $7231.91, minus the $500 deductible. After that, Fire Exchange sought subrogation from the insurers of the neighborhood children who had started the fire, eventually agreeing to a 5% reduction in the replacement cost to reflect the depreciating of the property before the fire. Fire Exchange then forwarded Birch a check for $475, which represented 95% of the deductible. Birch objected because he should have been paid 100% of the deductible before Fire Exchange could retain any of the amount collected from the children's insurers. When Fire Exchange refused to forward the additional 5% to Birch, he initiated a class action in the district court on behalf of himself and other similarly situated policyholders. The district court granted summary judgment in favor of Fire Exchange, and Birch appealed. Birch claimed that Utah Supreme Court precedent required that he be “made whole” before Fire Exchange could retain any amounts obtained through subrogation. The Utah Court of Appeals rejected Birch's argument, holding as a matter of first impression that he had been made whole. The Court of Appeals noted that Birch lost depreciated property worth $7346.26. Due to his insurance contract with Fire Exchange, Birch was entitled to more than the value of the property when it was destroyed in replacement value, minus his deductible. Fire Exchange paid Birch $7232.91 in replacement value and $475 to reimburse his deductible for a total of $7707.91. Because the total Birch received was $361.65 more than his actual losses of $7346.26, the Court of Appeals concluded that he had been made whole and affirmed the decision of the district court granting summary judgment in favor of Fire Exchange.

Fordham v. Oldroyd, 2006 UT App 50, 131 P.3d 280, affirmed, 2007 UT 74, 171 P.3d 411. State highway patrol trooper, Richard Fordham, brought an action against Ryan Oldroyd, a motorist whose negligence caused a traffic accident to which Fordham responded in an official capacity. While Trooper Fordham was retrieving flares from the trunk of his patrol car to mark the Oldroyd accident, an approaching driver lost control of her car and struck Fordham, inflicting substantial injuries. Trooper Fordham sued Oldroyd for the injuries he incurred when struck by the third party's vehicle, claiming that Oldroyd's negligence caused Fordham to be at the scene of the accident when the other vehicle lost control. The District Court granted summary judgment in favor of Oldroyd, and Fordham appealed. The Court of Appeals noted that this case presented Utah's first opportunity to consider whether the professional-rescuer doctrine operates to bar a police officer's claim against the party whose negligence caused the officer to be present at the scene, but where a third party actually inflicts the officer's injuries. Under the doctrine, a professional rescuer, such as a police officer, cannot recover for injuries sustained when responding to an emergency from the person who negligently created the circumstances creating the emergency. After considering the rationale for and against the doctrine, the Utah Court of Appeals concluded that it should be adopted in Utah. The court cautioned, however, that the doctrine is narrow, barring suit only for the negligence that creates the need for the professional rescuer's presence in the first instance, and not for any negligence resulting in injuries thereafter.

Forsberg v. Bovis Lend Lease, Inc., 2008 UT App 146, 184 P. 3d 610, cert. denied, 199 P.3d 367. After an electrical subcontractor on a hospital construction project filed for bankruptcy, the trustees of certain employment benefit funds (the Funds) sued the general contractor, its surety, and the owner for unpaid fringe benefit contributions to the Funds and to foreclose on its mechanics’ lien. The District Court granted the defendant’s motion for summary judgment, concluding that the Funds did not have standing, that fringe benefits were not recoverable either under the mechanics’ lien statute or the private payment bond statute and that ERISA preempted claims under either statute. The Funds appealed. Each issue raised on appeal was an issue of first impression in Utah. With respect to standing, the Utah Court of Appeals concluded that the Funds were within the zone of interest contemplated by the Utah Legislature because they were entitled to enforce the rights of the employees. Next, the Court of Appeals held that ERISA did not preempt Utah's mechanics’ lien and private bond statutes. Finally, the appellate court determined that the fringe benefits were part of the value of labor or services provided on the project and, therefore, could be recovered under the statutes. Consequently, the Court of Appeals reversed the decision of the District Court.

State v. Marks, 2011 UT App 262, 262 P.3d 13. Billy J. Marks was convicted of one count of sodomy on a child in connection with his conduct with his mentally challenged grandson and appealed his conviction. Marks argued that the trial court violated his Sixth Amendment right to confrontation by excluding evidence of 1) his grandson's possession of pornography, and 2) his grandson's simulation of sexual intercourse with his younger sister. According to Marks, the evidence was relevant to the grandson's sexual knowledge and his ability to fabricate the allegations. Marks also claimed the evidence was insufficient to support the verdict because the grandson's testimony was inherently inconsistent. The Utah Court of Appeals recognized the tension between rule 412 of the Utah Rules of Evidence, Utah's rape shield law, which bars evidence of the alleged victim's other sexual behavior, and the confrontation clause of the United States Constitution, that protects the accused's right to present a complete defense. The Court of Appeals concluded that a complete defense in a criminal case, includes the right to conduct reasonable cross-examination that is not limited arbitrarily or disproportionately to the purpose of any evidentiary rule limiting such cross-examination. Considering the purposes of rule 412 and the facts and circumstances at issue, the Court of Appeals concluded that excluding the evidence was not arbitrary or disproportionate to the purposes of Utah's rape shield rule. The Court of Appeals also held that the victim's testimony was not so inconsistent as to be inherently improbable. Thus, the court affirmed Mark's conviction.

== Professional and community service ==
- 1996 – Chairperson of the Utah State Bar Distinguished Committee
- 1997 – University of Utah College of Law Young Alumna of the Year
- 2001 – Christine M. Durham Utah Woman Lawyer of the Year
- 2009 – Dorothy Merrill Brothers Award for the Advancement of Women in the Legal Profession

McHugh is a past president of Women Lawyers in Utah, past co-chair of the American Bar Association Conference of Environmental Law, and past chair of the Needs of Children Committee of the Utah State Bar. She has served as a master of the bench in the American Inns of Court program and has completed training as a Fellow of the Advanced Science & Technology Adjudication Resource Center.

McHugh has been active in local charities, including, Catholic Community Services, the Office of the Guardian Ad Litem, Utah Children, Big Brothers Big Sisters, and The Legal Aid Society.

Legal offices
Preceded by Michael R. Murphy	Judge of the United States Court of Appeals for the Tenth Circuit; 2014–present	Incumbent
