= Richard Federico =

American judge (born 1977)

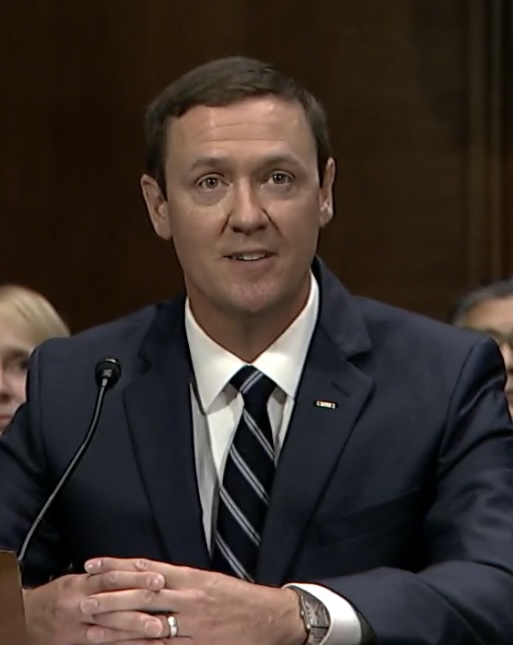

Judge of the United States Court of Appeals for the Tenth Circuit
- Incumbent
- Assumed office December 13, 2023
- Appointed by: Joe Biden
- Preceded by: Mary Beck Briscoe

Personal details
- Born: Richard Edward Neel Federico; 1977 (age 48–49) Richmond, Indiana, U.S.
- Education: Indiana University, Bloomington (BA); University of Kansas (JD); Georgetown University (LLM)

Military service
- Allegiance: United States
- Branch/service: United States Navy (2002–2015); United States Navy Reserve; Selected Reserve (2015–present)
- Rank: Captain
- Unit: Navy Judge Advocate General's Corps
- Awards: See list: Defense Meritorious Service Medal Meritorious Service Medal Navy and Marine Corps Commendation Medal Navy and Marine Corps Achievement Medal National Defense Service Medal Global War on Terrorism Expeditionary Medal Global War on Terrorism Service Medal Overseas Service Ribbon Navy Marksman Rifle Ribbon Navy Marksman Pistol Ribbon

Richard Edward Neel Federico (born 1977) is an American lawyer from Kansas who is serving as a United States circuit judge of the United States Court of Appeals for the Tenth Circuit.

== Education ==
Federico received a Bachelor of Journalism from Indiana University Bloomington in 1999 and a Juris Doctor from the University of Kansas School of Law in 2002, and a Master of Laws, with highest distinction, from Georgetown University Law Center in 2012.

== Career ==
He served in the United States Navy on active duty from 2002 to 2015, attaining the rank of captain, and has been in active status in the Select Reserves since 2015. Since 2002, Federico had served in the Judge Advocate General's Corps as a prosecutor and as a defense counsel from 2008 to 2015. From 2015 to 2017, he was an assistant federal public defender for the District of Oregon in Portland. He has been a military judge for the Navy Reserve Trial Judiciary since 2019, and he served as an Appellate Defense Counsel from 2015 to 2019. In 2017, Federico joined the Federal Public Defender for the District of Kansas in Topeka, where he served as a research and writing specialist from 2017 to 2018, an assistant federal public defender from 2018 to 2020 and as the senior litigator since 2020.

=== Federal judicial service ===
On July 27, 2023, President Joe Biden nominated Federico to serve as a United States circuit judge of the United States Court of Appeals for the Tenth Circuit. President Biden nominated Federico to the seat vacated by Judge Mary Beck Briscoe, who assumed senior status on March 15, 2021. On September 6, 2023, a hearing on his nomination was held before the Senate Judiciary Committee. During his confirmation hearing, he received push back from Republican Senators Josh Hawley and Marsha Blackburn over a client whom he had represented as a public defender in 2018. The client pled guilty to distributing child pornography and Federico made a sentencing recommendation that was below the federal sentencing guidelines for the charge. In response, Federico pointed out that as a public defender, it was his "professional responsibility to vigorously defend his client", whom he did not choose to represent. On September 28, 2023, his nomination was reported out of committee by a 13–8 vote. On December 7, 2023, the United States Senate invoked cloture on his nomination by a 63–32 vote. On December 11, 2023, his nomination was confirmed by a 61–29 vote. He received his judicial commission on December 13, 2023.

Legal offices
Preceded by Mary Beck Briscoe	Judge of the United States Court of Appeals for the Tenth Circuit; 2023–present	Incumbent
