= Orie Leon Phillips =

American judge (1885–1974)

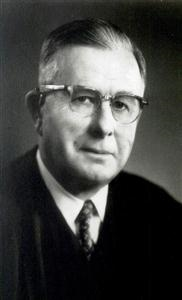

Senior Judge of the United States Court of Appeals for the Tenth Circuit
- In office January 1, 1956 – November 14, 1974

Chief Judge of the United States Court of Appeals for the Tenth Circuit
- In office September 1, 1948 – January 1, 1956
- Preceded by: Office established
- Succeeded by: Sam G. Bratton

Judge of the United States Court of Appeals for the Tenth Circuit
- In office April 29, 1929 – January 1, 1956
- Appointed by: Herbert Hoover
- Preceded by: Seat established by 45 Stat. 1346
- Succeeded by: David Thomas Lewis

Judge of the United States District Court for the District of New Mexico
- In office March 3, 1923 – April 29, 1929
- Appointed by: Warren G. Harding
- Preceded by: Seat established by 42 Stat. 837
- Succeeded by: Seat abolished

Personal details
- Born: Orie Leon Phillips; November 20, 1885 Mercer County, Illinois, U.S.
- Died: November 14, 1974 (aged 88)
- Education: University of Michigan Law School (JD)

Orie Leon Phillips (November 20, 1885 – November 14, 1974) was a United States circuit judge of the United States Court of Appeals for the Tenth Circuit and previously was a United States district judge of the United States District Court for the District of New Mexico.

== Education and career ==
Born on November 20, 1885, in Mercer County, Illinois, Phillips received a Juris Doctor in 1908 from the University of Michigan Law School. He entered private practice in Raton, New Mexico Territory (State of New Mexico from January 6, 1912) from 1910 to 1923. He was an assistant district attorney in the Eighth Judicial District of New Mexico from 1912 to 1916. He was general attorney of the St. Louis, Rocky Mountain and Pacific Company from 1917 to 1923. He was a member of the New Mexico Senate from 1920 to 1923.

== Federal judicial service ==
Phillips was nominated by President Warren G. Harding on February 28, 1923, to the United States District Court for the District of New Mexico, to a new seat authorized by 42 Stat. 837. He was confirmed by the United States Senate on March 3, 1923, and received his commission the same day. His service terminated on April 29, 1929, due to his elevation to the Tenth Circuit.

Phillips was nominated by President Herbert Hoover on April 18, 1929, to the United States Court of Appeals for the Tenth Circuit, to a new seat authorized by 45 Stat. 1346. He was confirmed by the Senate on April 29, 1929, and received his commission the same day. He was a member of the Conference of Senior Circuit Judges (now the Judicial Conference of the United States) from 1940 to 1948, and a member of the Judicial Conference of the United States from 1948 to 1955. He served as Chief Judge from September 1, 1948 to January 1, 1956, when he assumed senior status. His service terminated on November 14, 1974, due to his death.

== Supreme Court consideration ==
Orie Phillips was considered several times for the Supreme Court without ever being nominated. He had been considered a possibility to replace Oliver Wendell Holmes Jr. as Associate Justice when the latter stepped down in 1932, but the choice ultimately went to Benjamin N. Cardozo. With Harry S. Truman desiring to be bipartisan, Phillips was mentioned as a possible Republican replacement for Owen Roberts in 1945, but his complete lack of ties to Truman meant he was rapidly dismissed for that seat, which went to Harold Hitz Burton. Following the death of Harlan Fiske Stone in 1946, Phillips was on Truman's short list to replace him as Chief Justice, but the job ultimately went to Fred Vinson. In 1953 Phillips was considered one of the final six prospects to replace Vinson as Chief Justice but was not chosen due to his age.

== See also ==
- List of United States federal judges by longevity of service

== Sources ==
- "Phillips, Orie Leon - Federal Judicial Center". www.fjc.gov.

Legal offices
Preceded by Seat established by 42 Stat. 837	Judge of the United States District Court for the District of New Mexico; 1923–1929	Succeeded by Seat abolished
Preceded by Seat established by 45 Stat. 1346	Judge of the United States Court of Appeals for the Tenth Circuit; 1929–1956	Succeeded by David Thomas Lewis
Preceded by Office established	Chief Judge of the United States Court of Appeals for the Tenth Circuit; 1948–1955	Succeeded by Sam G. Bratton
