= Susan B. Loving =

Oklahoma USA's first female attorney general

Susan Brimer Loving

15th Attorney General of Oklahoma
- In office June 22, 1991 – January 9, 1995
- Governor: David Walters
- Preceded by: Robert Harlan Henry
- Succeeded by: Drew Edmondson

Personal details
- Born: March 23, 1950 (age 76)
- Party: Democratic

Susan Brimer Loving (born March 23, 1950) was Oklahoma's first female attorney general. She was appointed in 1991 after serving as both first assistant attorney general and chief of legal services in the Office of the Attorney General.

== Career ==
Loving attended the University of Oklahoma for her undergraduate and law degrees and was appointed to the office of Attorney General.

=== Post-politics ===
Since leaving office, Loving served as managing partner of Lester, Loving and Davies law firm and from 2003 she was a member of the Oklahoma Pardon and Parole Board for eight years, as an appointee of Governor Brad Henry.

She has served on the board of multiple civic organizations, and is a member of the Professional Responsibility Tribunal of the Oklahoma Bar Association. In the 1990s she was president of the Freedom of Information Oklahoma.

Loving is the author of "The Southwestern Bell Case: Policy, Politics or Lawmaking Gone Awry," Oklahoma City University Law Review, fall 1994.

== See also ==
- List of female state attorneys general in the United States

Political offices
| Preceded by Robert Harlan Henry | Attorney General of Oklahoma; June, 1991 - January, 1995 | Succeeded by Drew Edmondson |
