= Sam G. Bratton =

American judge (1888–1963)

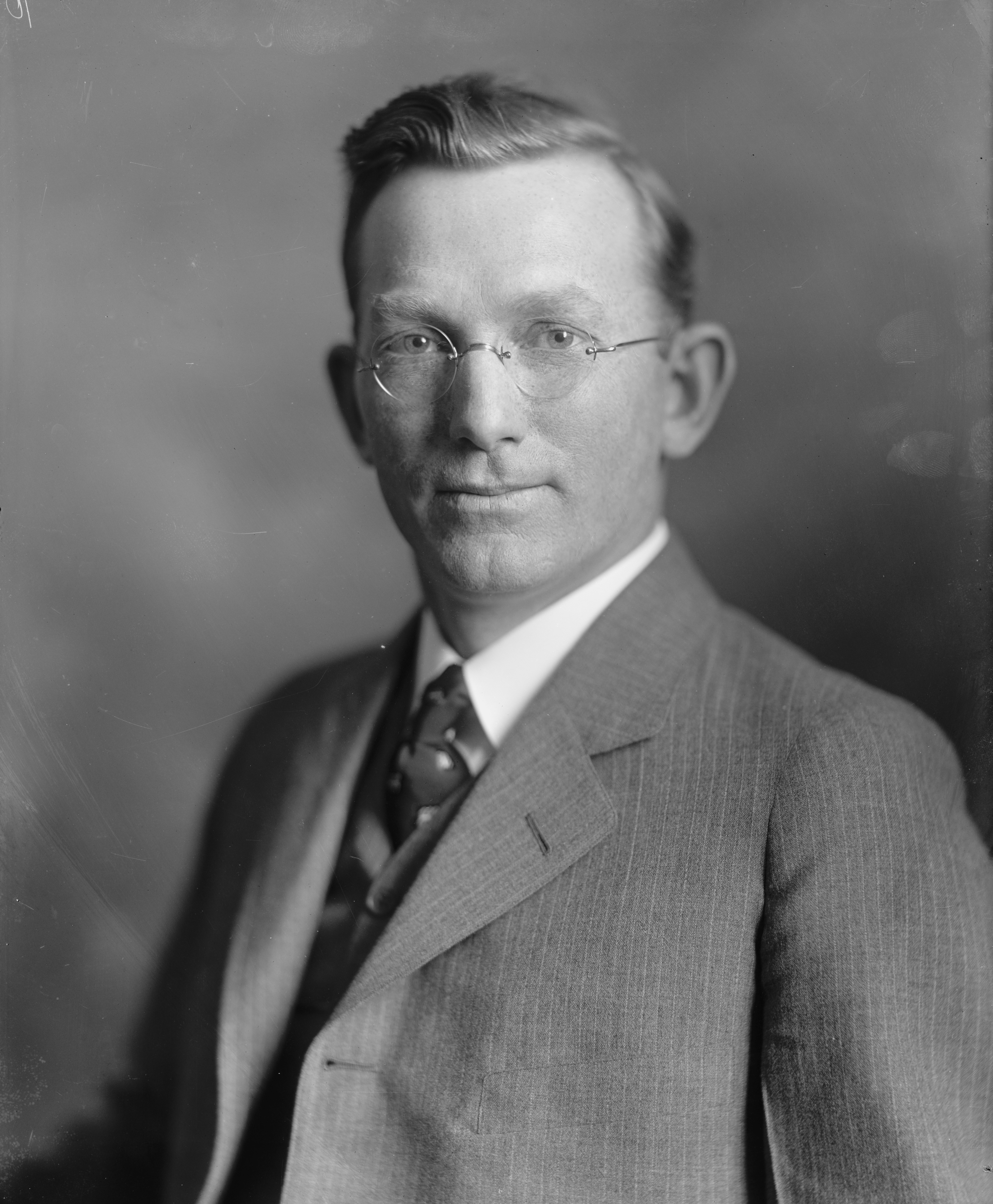
- Bratton in 1905

Senior Judge of the United States Court of Appeals for the Tenth Circuit
- In office March 1, 1961 – September 22, 1963

Chief Judge of the United States Court of Appeals for the Tenth Circuit
- In office January 1, 1956 – August 7, 1959
- Preceded by: Orie Leon Phillips
- Succeeded by: Alfred P. Murrah

Judge of the United States Court of Appeals for the Tenth Circuit
- In office June 1, 1933 – March 1, 1961
- Appointed by: Franklin D. Roosevelt
- Preceded by: John Hazelton Cotteral
- Succeeded by: Oliver Seth

United States Senator from New Mexico
- In office March 4, 1925 – June 24, 1933
- Preceded by: Holm O. Bursum
- Succeeded by: Carl Hatch

Personal details
- Born: Samuel Gilbert Bratton; August 19, 1888 Kosse, Texas, U.S.
- Died: September 22, 1963 (aged 75) Albuquerque, New Mexico, U.S.
- Resting place: Fairview Park Cemetery; Albuquerque, New Mexico
- Party: Democratic
- Spouse: Fannie Vivian Rogers
- Children: 1 son, 2 daughters
- Education: Read law

Samuel Gilbert Bratton (August 19, 1888 – September 22, 1963) was a United States senator from New Mexico and a United States circuit judge of the United States Court of Appeals for the Tenth Circuit.

== Education and career ==
Born in Kosse, Texas on August 19, 1888, Bratton attended the public schools. A graduate of the state Normal School, he taught school for some years in Claude, Texas and Hereford, Texas. He read law and was admitted to the bar in 1909, whereupon he began practice in Farwell, Texas. He continued his practice upon moving to Clovis, New Mexico in 1915. From 1919 to 1921 he served as the district court judge for the fifth judicial district of that state. Upon division of the district, he continued in the same capacity for the ninth judicial district until 1923, when he succeeded Herbert F. Raynolds to become an associate justice of the New Mexico Supreme Court. He remained in this position until 1924, when he resigned to accept the Democratic nomination for the United States Senate.

== Congressional service ==
Bratton was elected as a Democrat to the United States Senate in 1924 and was reelected in 1930 and served from March 4, 1925, until his resignation, effective June 24, 1933. He served as Chairman of the Committee on Irrigation and Reclamation in the 73rd United States Congress.

== Federal judicial service ==
Bratton was nominated by President Franklin D. Roosevelt on June 1, 1933, to a seat on the United States Court of Appeals for the Tenth Circuit vacated by Judge John Hazelton Cotteral. He was confirmed by the United States Senate on June 1, 1933, and received his commission the same day. He was among the candidates for the United States Supreme Court vacancy created by the retirement of Willis Van Devanter in 1937, but was passed over by Roosevelt in favor of Hugo Black. Bratton served as Chief Judge and as a member of the Judicial Conference of the United States from January 1, 1956 to August 7, 1959. He assumed senior status on March 1, 1961. His service terminated on September 22, 1963, due to his death in Albuquerque, New Mexico. He is interred in Fairview Park Cemetery in Albuquerque.

== Sources ==
- "Sam Gilbert Bratton". Biographical Directory of the United States Congress.

Party political offices
Preceded by Richard H. Hanna	Democratic nominee for U.S. Senator from New Mexico (Class 2); 1924, 1930	Succeeded by Carl Hatch
U.S. Senate
Preceded by Holm O. Bursum	U.S. senator (Class 2) from New Mexico; 1925–1933; Served alongside: Andrieus A. Jones, Bronson M. Cutting, Octaviano Larrazolo, Bronson M. Cutting	Succeeded by Carl Hatch
Legal offices
Preceded by John Hazelton Cotteral	Judge of the United States Court of Appeals for the Tenth Circuit; 1933–1961	Succeeded by Oliver Seth
Preceded by Orie Leon Phillips	Chief Judge of the United States Court of Appeals for the Tenth Circuit; 1956–1959	Succeeded by Alfred P. Murrah
