= Nancy Moritz =

American judge (born 1960)

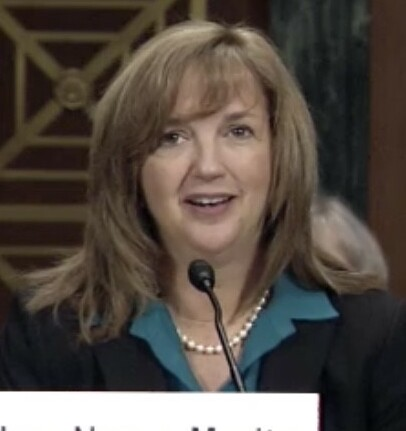
- Moritz in 2013

Judge of the United States Court of Appeals for the Tenth Circuit
- Incumbent
- Assumed office July 29, 2014
- Appointed by: Barack Obama
- Preceded by: Deanell Reece Tacha

Justice of the Kansas Supreme Court
- In office January 7, 2011 – July 29, 2014
- Appointed by: Mark Parkinson
- Preceded by: Robert Davis
- Succeeded by: Caleb Stegall

Judge of the Kansas Court of Appeals
- In office October 1, 2004 – January 7, 2011
- Appointed by: Kathleen Sebelius
- Succeeded by: David E. Bruns

Personal details
- Born: Nancy Louise Moritz; 1960 (age 65–66) Beloit, Kansas, U.S.
- Education: Washburn University (BBA, JD)

Nancy Louise Moritz (born 1960) is a United States circuit judge of the United States Court of Appeals for the Tenth Circuit and former justice of the Kansas Supreme Court.

== Biography ==
Moritz (formerly Caplinger) was born in Beloit, Kansas. She grew up in Tipton, Kansas, before her family moved to Salina, Kansas, when Moritz was 15 years old. She graduated valedictorian of her class from Sacred Heart High School in Salina. She received her Bachelor of Business Administration degree from Washburn University in 1982 and her Juris Doctor from Washburn Law School in 1985. She has two daughters.

== Career ==
Moritz began her legal career in 1985 as a research attorney for Justice Harold S. Herd of the Kansas Supreme Court. In 1987, she became a law clerk to Judge Patrick F. Kelly with the United States District Court for the District of Kansas. From 1989 to 1995, she was an associate with the law firm Spencer, Fane, Britt and Browne in Overland Park, where she primarily defended businesses and municipalities against federal claims. She then became an assistant United States attorney in Kansas City, focusing on medical malpractice and employment discrimination law. until 1999, when she became an Appellate Coordinator for the United States Attorney's office. As Appellate Coordinator, Moritz wrote more than 170 briefs in both civil and criminal matters, and personally argued about 25 cases before the Tenth Circuit. She held this position until her appointment to the Kansas Court of Appeals by Democratic Governor Kathleen Sebelius in 2004. Democrat Governor Mark Parkinson appointed her to the Kansas Supreme Court in November 2010, and she was sworn in on January 7, 2011, replacing former Chief Justice Robert E. Davis, serving until July 29, 2014.

=== Federal judicial service ===
In August 2013, President Barack Obama tapped Moritz for a seat on the United States Court of Appeals for the Tenth Circuit. Moritz was nominated after the nomination of former Kansas Attorney General Stephen Six was defeated by strong Republican opposition. In contrast to Six, Moritz generated little controversy. On April 29, 2014, Senate Majority Leader Harry Reid filed for cloture on Moritz's nomination On May 1, 2014, the Senate invoked cloture on her nomination by a 60–38 vote. On May 5, 2014, her nomination was confirmed by a 90–3 vote. She received her commission on July 29, 2014.

Legal offices
Preceded by Robert E. Davis	Justice of the Kansas Supreme Court; 2011–2014	Succeeded by Caleb Stegall
Preceded by Deanell Reece Tacha	Judge of the United States Court of Appeals for the Tenth Circuit; 2014–present	Incumbent
