= Deanell Reece Tacha =

American judge (born 1946)

Deanell Tacha
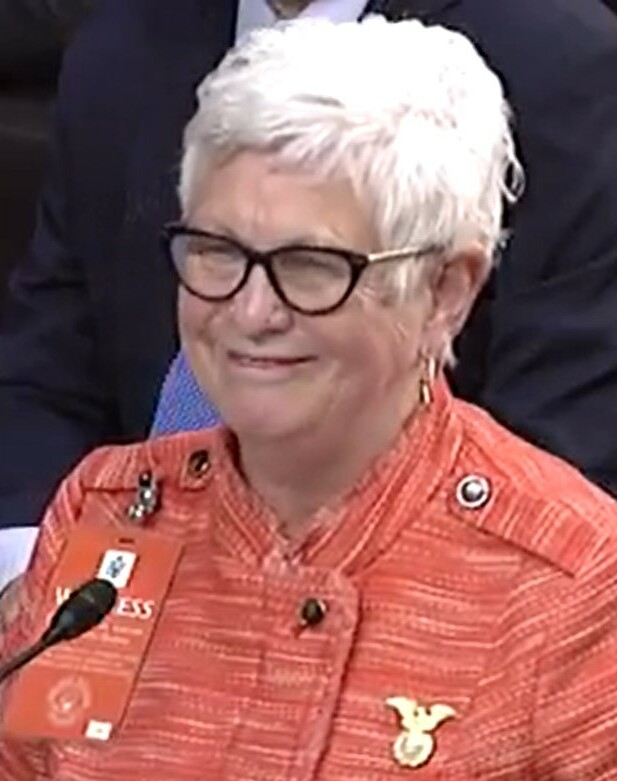
- Tacha in 2017

Senior Judge of the United States Court of Appeals for the Tenth Circuit
- In office January 27, 2011 – June 1, 2011

Chief Judge of the United States Court of Appeals for the Tenth Circuit
- In office January 1, 2001 – January 24, 2008
- Preceded by: Stephanie Kulp Seymour
- Succeeded by: Robert Harlan Henry

Judge of the United States Court of Appeals for the Tenth Circuit
- In office December 16, 1985 – January 27, 2011
- Appointed by: Ronald Reagan
- Preceded by: Seat established
- Succeeded by: Nancy Moritz

Personal details
- Born: January 26, 1946 (age 80) Goodland, Kansas, U.S.
- Education: University of Kansas (BA); University of Michigan (JD)

Deanell Reece Tacha (born January 26, 1946) is a retired United States circuit judge who served on the United States Court of Appeals for the Tenth Circuit. She was the Dean of the Pepperdine University School of Law from 2011 to 2016.

== Education and career ==
Born in Goodland, Kansas, Tacha received a Bachelor of Arts degree from the University of Kansas in 1968 and a Juris Doctor from the University of Michigan Law School in 1971. She was a White House Fellow and special assistant to the Secretary of Labor at the United States Department of Labor from 1971 to 1972. She was in private practice in Washington, D.C., and Concordia, Kansas, from 1973 to 1974. She then served as Director of the Douglas County Legal Aid Clinic in Lawrence, Kansas, until 1977. She was also on the faculty of the University of Kansas School of Law from 1974 to 1985.

== Federal judicial service ==
On October 31, 1985, Tacha was nominated by President Ronald Reagan to a new seat on the United States Court of Appeals for the Tenth Circuit created by 98 Stat. 333. She was confirmed by the United States Senate on December 16, 1985, and received her commission the same day. She served as Chief Judge of the Circuit from 2001 to 2008, and was succeeded by Judge Robert Harlan Henry. She also served as a member of the United States Sentencing Commission from 1994 to 1998. Tacha took senior status on January 27, 2011. She retired completely on June 1, 2011.

== Post judicial service ==
In 2008, Tacha received the 26th Annual Edward J. Devitt Distinguished Service to Justice Award from the American Judicature Society. On February 10, 2011, Tacha was named Dean of the Pepperdine University School of Law, taking up that post after retiring from the federal bench on June 1, 2011. She retired as Dean of Pepperdine University School of Law on December 31, 2016. She serves as chair of the executive committee of the University of Kansas Endowment.

== See also ==
- George W. Bush Supreme Court candidates

== Sources ==
- Deanell Reece Tacha profile, fjc.gov; accessed June 8, 2017.

Legal offices
New seat	Judge of the United States Court of Appeals for the Tenth Circuit; 1985–2011	Succeeded by Nancy Moritz
Preceded by Stephanie Kulp Seymour	Chief Judge of the United States Court of Appeals for the Tenth Circuit; 2001–2008	Succeeded by Robert Harlan Henry
Academic offices
Preceded by Ken Starr	Dean of the Pepperdine University School of Law; 2011–2016	Succeeded by Paul L. Caron
