= United States Court of Appeals for the Tenth Circuit =

Current United States federal appellate court

- (10th Cir.)
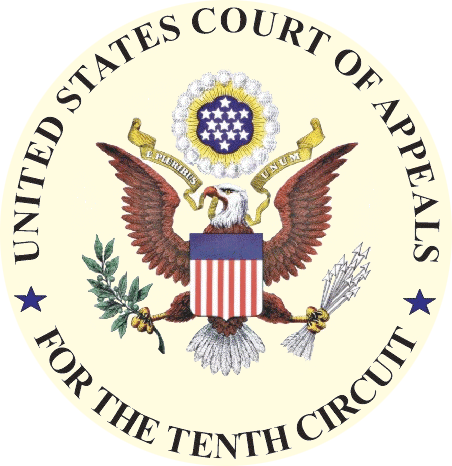

- Location: Byron White U.S. Courthouse (Denver, Colorado)
- Appeals from: District of Colorado; District of Kansas; District of New Mexico; Eastern District of Oklahoma; Northern District of Oklahoma; Western District of Oklahoma; District of Utah; District of Wyoming
- Established: March 28, 1929
- Judges: 12
- Circuit Justice: Neil Gorsuch
- Chief Judge: Jerome Holmes
- www.ca10.uscourts.gov

The United States Court of Appeals for the Tenth Circuit (in case citations, 10th Cir.) is a federal court with appellate jurisdiction over the district courts in the following districts:

- District of Colorado
- District of Kansas
- District of New Mexico
- Eastern District of Oklahoma
- Northern District of Oklahoma
- Western District of Oklahoma
- District of Utah
- District of Wyoming

Although the 37th United States Congress passed the Tenth Circuit Act of 1863, the circuit ceased to exist after six years due to the Judiciary Act of 1869. These districts were part of the Eighth Circuit until 1929. The court is composed of 11 active judges and is based at the Byron White U.S. Courthouse in Denver, Colorado. It is one of 13 United States courts of appeals and has jurisdiction over 560,625 square miles, or roughly one seventh of the country's land mass.

== History ==
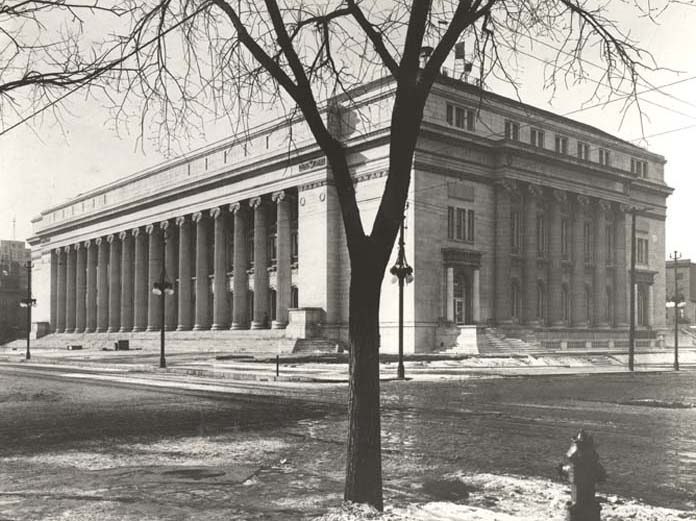
U.S. Post Office and Courthouse, as it appeared around 1916.

Congress created a new judicial circuit in 1929 to accommodate the increased caseload in the federal courts. Between 1866 and 1912, twelve new states had entered the Union and been incorporated into the Eighth and Ninth Circuits. The Eighth Circuit encompassed 13 states and had become the largest in the nation.

Chief Justice William Howard Taft suggested the reorganization of the Eighth Circuit Court in response to widespread opposition in 1928 to a proposal to reorganize the nation's entire circuit structure. The original plan had sprung from an American Bar Association committee in 1925 and would have changed the composition of all but two circuits.

The House of Representatives considered two proposals to divide the existing Eighth Circuit. A bill by Representative Walter Newton would separate the circuit's eastern and western states. An alternate proposal divided the northern from the southern states. With the judges and bar of the existing Eighth Circuit for Newton's bill and little opposition to dividing the circuit, lawmakers focused on providing for more judgeships and meeting places of the circuit courts of appeals in their deliberations.

In 1929, Congress passed a law that placed the federal U.S. district courts in Minnesota, Iowa, North Dakota, South Dakota, Nebraska, Missouri, and Arkansas in the Eighth Circuit and created a Tenth Circuit that included Wyoming, Colorado, Utah, New Mexico, Kansas, and Oklahoma. Three additional judgeships were authorized and the sitting circuit judges were reassigned according to their residence. The Tenth Circuit was assigned a total of four judgeships.

== Current composition of the court ==
As of November 16, 2026:

#	Title	Judge	Duty station	Born	Term of service			Appointed by
#	Title	Judge	Duty station	Born	Active	Chief	Senior	Appointed by
38	Chief Judge	Jerome Holmes	Oklahoma City, OK	1961	2006–present	2022–present	—	G.W. Bush
33	Circuit Judge	Harris Hartz	Albuquerque, NM	1947	2001–present	—	—	G.W. Bush
39	Circuit Judge	Scott Matheson Jr.	Salt Lake City, UT	1953	2010–present	—	—	Obama
40	Circuit Judge	Robert E. Bacharach	Oklahoma City, OK	1959	2013–present	—	—	Obama
41	Circuit Judge	Gregory A. Phillips	Cheyenne, WY	1960	2013–present	—	—	Obama
42	Circuit Judge	Carolyn B. McHugh	Salt Lake City, UT	1957	2014–present	—	—	Obama
43	Circuit Judge	Nancy Moritz	Topeka, KS	1960	2014–present	—	—	Obama
44	Circuit Judge	Allison H. Eid	Denver, CO	1965	2017–present	—	—	Trump
45	Circuit Judge	Joel M. Carson III	Roswell, NM	1971	2018–present	—	—	Trump
46	Circuit Judge	Veronica S. Rossman	Denver, CO	1972	2021–present	—	—	Biden
47	Circuit Judge	Richard Federico	Topeka, KS	1977	2023–present	—	—	Biden
48	Circuit Judge	vacant				—	—	
21	Senior Judge	Stephanie Kulp Seymour	inactive	1940	1979–2005	1994–2000	2005–present	Carter
22	Senior Judge	John Carbone Porfilio	inactive	1934	1985–1999	—	1999–present	Reagan
23	Senior Judge	Stephen H. Anderson	inactive	1932	1985–2000	—	2000–present	Reagan
25	Senior Judge	Bobby Baldock	Roswell, NM	1936	1985–2001	—	2001–present	Reagan
26	Senior Judge	Wade Brorby	inactive	1934	1988–2001	—	2001–present	Reagan
27	Senior Judge	David M. Ebel	Denver, CO	1940	1988–2006	—	2006–present	Reagan
28	Senior Judge	Paul Joseph Kelly Jr.	Santa Fe, NM	1940	1992–2017	—	2017–present	G.H.W. Bush
30	Senior Judge	Mary Beck Briscoe	inactive	1947	1995–2021	2010–2015	2021–present	Clinton
31	Senior Judge	Carlos F. Lucero	Denver, CO	1940	1995–2021	—	2021–present	Clinton
32	Senior Judge	Michael R. Murphy	Salt Lake City, UT	1947	1995–2012	—	2012–present	Clinton
34	Senior Judge	Terrence L. O'Brien	Cheyenne, WY	1943	2002–2013	—	2013–present	G.W. Bush
36	Senior Judge	Timothy Tymkovich	Denver, CO	1956	2003–2026	2015–2022	2026-present	G.W. Bush

== Vacancies and pending nominations ==
Seat	Prior Judge's Duty Station	Seat last held by	Vacancy reason	Date of vacancy	Nominee	Date of nomination
4	Denver, CO	Timothy Tymkovich	Senior status	November 16, 2026	Daniel D. Domenico	May 12, 2026

== List of former judges ==
#	Judge	State	Born–died	Active service	Chief Judge	Senior status	Appointed by	Reason for termination
1	Robert E. Lewis	CO	1857–1941	1929–1940	—	1940–1941	Harding / Operation of law	death
2	John Hazelton Cotteral	OK	1864–1933	1929–1933	—	—	Coolidge / Operation of law	death
3	Orie Leon Phillips	NM	1885–1974	1929–1956	1948–1956	1956–1974	Hoover	death
4	George McDermott	KS	1886–1937	1929–1937	—	—	Hoover	death
5	Sam G. Bratton	NM	1888–1963	1933–1961	1956–1959	1961–1963	F. Roosevelt	death
6	Robert L. Williams	OK	1868–1948	1937–1939	—	1939–1948	F. Roosevelt	death
7	Walter A. Huxman	KS	1887–1972	1939–1957	—	1957–1972	F. Roosevelt	death
8	Alfred P. Murrah	OK	1904–1975	1940–1970	1959–1970	1970–1975	F. Roosevelt	death
9	John Coleman Pickett	WY	1896–1983	1949–1966	—	1966–1983	Truman	death
10	David Thomas Lewis	UT	1912–1983	1956–1977	1970–1977	1977–1983	Eisenhower	death
11	Jean Sala Breitenstein	CO	1900–1986	1957–1970	—	1970–1986	Eisenhower	death
12	Delmas Carl Hill	KS	1906–1989	1961–1977	—	1977–1989	Kennedy	death
13	Oliver Seth	NM	1915–1996	1962–1984	1977–1984	1984–1996	Kennedy	death
14	Joe Hickey	WY	1911–1970	1966–1970	—	—	L. Johnson	death
15	William Holloway Jr.	OK	1923–2014	1968–1992	1984–1991	1992–2014	L. Johnson	death
16	Robert McWilliams Jr.	CO	1916–2013	1970–1984	—	1984–2013	Nixon	death
17	James Emmett Barrett	WY	1922–2011	1971–1987	—	1987–2011	Nixon	death
18	William Edward Doyle	CO	1911–1986	1971–1984	—	1984–1986	Nixon	death
19	Monroe G. McKay	UT	1928–2020	1977–1993	1991–1993	1993–2020	Carter	death
20	James Kenneth Logan	KS	1929–2018	1977–1994	—	1994–1998	Carter	retirement
24	Deanell Reece Tacha	KS	1946–present	1985–2011	2001–2008	2011	Reagan	retirement
29	Robert Harlan Henry	OK	1953–present	1994–2010	2008–2010	—	Clinton	resignation
35	Michael W. McConnell	UT	1955–present	2002–2009	—	—	G.W. Bush	resignation
37	Neil Gorsuch	CO	1967–present	2006–2017	—	—	G.W. Bush	elevation

== Chief judges ==
Chief Judge
Phillips	1948–1956
Bratton	1956–1959
Murrah	1959–1970
Lewis	1970–1977
Seth	1977–1984
Holloway, Jr.	1984–1991
McKay	1991–1993
Seymour	1994–2000
Tacha	2001–2008
Henry	2008–2010
Briscoe	2010–2015
Tymkovich	2015–2022
Holmes	2022–present

Chief judges have administrative responsibilities with respect to their circuits, and preside over any panel on which they serve, unless the circuit justice (the Supreme Court justice responsible for the circuit) is also on the panel. Unlike the Supreme Court, where one justice is specifically nominated to be chief, the office of chief judge rotates among the circuit judges.

To be chief, a judge must have been in active service on the court for at least one year, be under the age of 65, and have not previously served as chief judge. A vacancy is filled by the judge highest in seniority among the group of qualified judges, with seniority determined first by commission date, then by age. The chief judge serves for a term of seven years, or until age 70, whichever occurs first. If no judge qualifies to be chief, the youngest judge over the age of 65 who has served on the court for at least one year shall act as chief until another judge qualifies. If no judge has served on the court for more than a year, the most senior judge shall act as chief. Judges can forfeit or resign their chief judgeship or acting chief judgeship while retaining their active status as a circuit judge.

When the office was created in 1948, the chief judge was the longest-serving judge who had not elected to retire, on what has since 1958 been known as senior status, or declined to serve as chief judge. After August 6, 1959, judges could not become or remain chief after turning 70 years old. The current rules have been in operation since October 1, 1982.

== Succession of seats ==
The court has twelve seats for active judges, numbered in the order in which they were initially filled. Judges who assume senior status enter a kind of retirement in which they remain on the bench but vacate their seats, thus allowing the U.S. President to appoint new judges to fill their seats.

Seat 1
Established on December 10, 1869 by the Judiciary Act of 1869 as a circuit judgeship for the Eighth Circuit
Reassigned on June 16, 1891 to the United States Circuit Court of Appeals for the Eighth Circuit by the Judiciary Act of 1891
Reassigned on February 28, 1929 to the United States Circuit Court of Appeals for the Tenth Circuit by 45 Stat. 1346
R. Lewis	CO	1929–1940
Murrah	OK	1940–1970
Doyle	CO	1971–1984
Ebel	CO	1988–2006
Gorsuch	CO	2006–2017
Eid	CO	2017–present

Seat 2
Established on June 16, 1891 by the Judiciary Act of 1891 as a seat of the Circuit Court of Appeals for the Eighth Circuit
Reassigned on February 28, 1929 to the United States Circuit Court of Appeals for the Tenth Circuit by 45 Stat. 1346
Cotteral	OK	1929–1933
Bratton	NM	1933–1961
Seth	NM	1962–1984
Baldock	NM	1985–2001
Hartz	NM	2001–present

Seat 3
Established on February 28, 1929 by 45 Stat. 1346
Phillips	NM	1929–1956
D. Lewis	UT	1956–1977
McKay	UT	1977–1993
Murphy	UT	1995–2012
McHugh	UT	2014–present

Seat 4
Established on February 28, 1929 by 45 Stat. 1346
McDermott	KS	1929–1937
Williams	OK	1937–1939
Huxman	KS	1939–1957
Breitenstein	CO	1957–1970
McWilliams, Jr.	CO	1970–1984
Porfilio	CO	1985–1999
Tymkovich	CO	2003–2026

Seat 5
Established on August 3, 1949 by 63 Stat. 493
Pickett	WY	1949–1966
Hickey	WY	1966–1970
Barrett	WY	1971–1987
Brorby	WY	1988–2001
O'Brien	WY	2002–2013
Phillips	WY	2013–present

Seat 6
Established on May 19, 1961 by 75 Stat. 80
Hill	KS	1961–1977
Logan	KS	1977–1994
Briscoe	KS	1995–2021
Federico	KS	2023–present

Seat 7
Established on June 18, 1968 by 82 Stat. 184
Holloway, Jr.	OK	1968–1992
Henry	OK	1994–2010
Bacharach	OK	2013–present

Seat 8
Established on October 20, 1978 by 92 Stat. 1629
Seymour	OK	1979–2005
Holmes	OK	2006–present

Seat 9
Established on July 10, 1984 by 98 Stat. 333
Anderson	UT	1985–2000
McConnell	UT	2002–2009
Matheson, Jr.	UT	2010–present

Seat 10
Established on July 10, 1984 by 98 Stat. 333
Tacha	KS	1985–2011
Moritz	KS	2014–present

Seat 11
Established on December 1, 1990 by 104 Stat. 5089
Kelly, Jr.	NM	1992–2017
Carson III	NM	2018–present

Seat 12
Established on December 1, 1990 by 104 Stat. 5089
Lucero	CO	1995–2021
Rossman	CO	2021–present

== See also ==
- Judicial appointment history for United States federal courts of the Tenth Circuit
- List of current United States circuit judges
