= Stephanie Kulp Seymour =

American judge (born 1940)

Stephanie Seymour

Senior Judge of the United States Court of Appeals for the Tenth Circuit
- Incumbent
- Assumed office October 16, 2005

Chief Judge of the United States Court of Appeals for the Tenth Circuit
- In office January 1, 1994 – December 31, 2000
- Preceded by: Monroe G. McKay
- Succeeded by: Deanell Reece Tacha

Judge of the United States Court of Appeals for the Tenth Circuit
- In office November 2, 1979 – October 16, 2005
- Appointed by: Jimmy Carter
- Preceded by: Seat established
- Succeeded by: Jerome Holmes

Personal details
- Born: Stephanie Irene Kulp; October 16, 1940 (age 85) Battle Creek, Michigan, U.S.
- Spouse(s): Anderson Bartlett (divorced) Thomas Seymour (m. 1972; died 2023)
- Children: 4
- Education: Smith College (BA); Harvard University (JD)

Stephanie Kulp Seymour (born October 16, 1940) is a senior United States circuit judge of the United States Court of Appeals for the Tenth Circuit. She was the first female federal court judge in Oklahoma. In 2025, Seymour became the longest-serving judge in the history of the United States Court of Appeals for the Tenth Circuit.

== Background and career ==
Seymour was born in Battle Creek, Michigan in 1940, the second oldest of four children. Seymour and her family traveled extensively when she was young, visiting all but three states by car by the time she went to college. Though neither of her parents had a college education, they strongly influenced Seymour to obtain the highest level of education possible. Seymour received a Bachelor of Arts degree from Smith College in 1962, graduating Phi Beta Kappa and magna cum laude, and her Juris Doctor from Harvard Law School in 1965. At Harvard Law School, she was one of 23 women in a class of 550.

Seymour was in private practice in Boston, Massachusetts from 1965 to 1966, in Tulsa, Oklahoma from 1966 to 1967, in Houston, Texas from 1968 to 1969, and in Tulsa again from 1971 to 1979. In Houston, she was the first woman hired by Baker Botts.

== Federal judicial service ==
Seymour was nominated by President Jimmy Carter on August 28, 1979, to the United States Court of Appeals for the Tenth Circuit, to a new seat created by 92 Stat. 1629. She was confirmed by the United States Senate on October 31, 1979, and received her commission on November 2, 1979. She served as Chief Judge from 1994 to 2000. She assumed senior status on October 16, 2005. Seymour took inactive status in August 2025, having served as an active status judge for 46 years.

== See also ==
- List of United States federal judges by longevity of service

Legal offices
New seat	Judge of the United States Court of Appeals for the Tenth Circuit; 1979–2005	Succeeded by Jerome Holmes
Preceded by Monroe G. McKay	Chief Judge of the United States Court of Appeals for the Tenth Circuit; 1994–2000	Succeeded by Deanell Reece Tacha
