= Oliver Seth =

American judge (1915–1996)

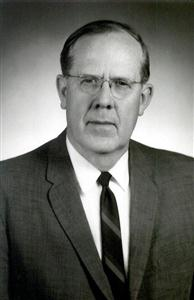

Senior Judge of the United States Court of Appeals for the Tenth Circuit
- In office December 25, 1984 – March 27, 1996

Chief Judge of the United States Court of Appeals for the Tenth Circuit
- In office December 3, 1977 – September 15, 1984
- Preceded by: David Thomas Lewis
- Succeeded by: William Judson Holloway Jr.

Judge of the United States Court of Appeals for the Tenth Circuit
- In office June 20, 1962 – December 25, 1984
- Appointed by: John F. Kennedy
- Preceded by: Sam G. Bratton
- Succeeded by: Bobby Baldock

Personal details
- Born: Oliver Seth; May 30, 1915 Albuquerque, New Mexico, U.S.
- Died: March 27, 1996 (aged 80)
- Education: Stanford University (BA); Yale Law School (LLB)

Oliver Seth (May 30, 1915 – March 27, 1996) was a United States circuit judge of the United States Court of Appeals for the Tenth Circuit.

== Education and career ==
Born in Albuquerque, New Mexico, Seth received a Bachelor of Arts degree from Stanford University in 1937. He received a Bachelor of Laws from Yale Law School in 1940. He was in private practice of law in Santa Fe, New Mexico in 1940. He was a United States Army Major from 1940 to 1946. He returned to private practice in Santa Fe from 1946 to 1962. He was a Government Appeal Agent for the Selective Service System from 1948 to 1952.

== Federal judicial service ==
Seth was nominated by President John F. Kennedy on May 24, 1962, to a seat on the United States Court of Appeals for the Tenth Circuit vacated by Judge Sam G. Bratton. He was confirmed by the United States Senate on June 11, 1962, and received his commission on June 20, 1962. He served as Chief Judge from December 3, 1977 to September 15, 1984. He assumed senior status on December 25, 1984. He continued actively hearing cases until his service was terminated on March 27, 1996, due to his death.

Legal offices
Preceded by Sam G. Bratton	Judge of the United States Court of Appeals for the Tenth Circuit; 1962–1984	Succeeded by Bobby Baldock
Preceded by David Thomas Lewis	Chief Judge of the United States Court of Appeals for the Tenth Circuit; 1977–1984	Succeeded by William Judson Holloway Jr.
