= Mary Beck Briscoe =

American judge (born 1947)

Mary Briscoe
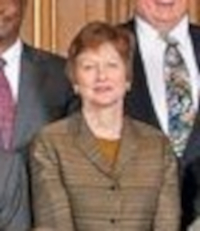

Senior Judge of the United States Court of Appeals for the Tenth Circuit
- Incumbent
- Assumed office March 15, 2021

Chief Judge of the United States Court of Appeals for the Tenth Circuit
- In office May 1, 2010 – October 1, 2015
- Preceded by: Robert Harlan Henry
- Succeeded by: Timothy Tymkovich

Judge of the United States Court of Appeals for the Tenth Circuit
- In office May 26, 1995 – March 15, 2021
- Appointed by: Bill Clinton
- Preceded by: James Kenneth Logan
- Succeeded by: Richard Federico

Personal details
- Born: Mary Kathryn Beck; April 4, 1947 (age 78); Council Grove, Kansas, U.S.
- Spouse: Charles Briscoe
- Education: University of Kansas (BA, JD); University of Virginia (LLM)

Mary Kathryn Beck Briscoe (born April 4, 1947) is a senior United States circuit judge of the United States Court of Appeals for the Tenth Circuit.

== Early life and education ==
Briscoe was born in Council Grove, Kansas, and grew up on a farm near that community. She graduated from Dwight Rural High School in 1965 as her small class's valedictorian, according to a June 1, 1995 article in the Kansas City Star. She then earned a Bachelor of Arts degree from the University of Kansas in 1969. Briscoe received a Juris Doctor from the University of Kansas School of Law in 1973, and earned a Master of Laws from the University of Virginia School of Law in 1990.

== Legal career ==
Briscoe began her legal career in 1973, first as a legal researcher, then working for the Interstate Commerce Commission as an attorney-examiner. In 1974, she was appointed Assistant United States Attorney for Kansas, eventually becoming the Supervising Attorney for the Topeka office. She was appointed to the Kansas Court of Appeals in 1984 by Gov. John W. Carlin, where she served until her appointment to the Tenth Circuit. From 1990 until 1995, Briscoe was the Chief Judge of the Kansas Court of Appeals.

== Federal judicial service ==
On March 14, 1995, President Bill Clinton nominated Briscoe to a seat on the United States Court of Appeals for the Tenth Circuit to replace Judge James Kenneth Logan, who retired on August 31, 1994. Her nomination was uncontroversial, and the United States Senate confirmed her by a voice vote on May 25, 1995. She received her commission on May 26, 1995. She served as Chief Judge from May 1, 2010 to October 1, 2015. Briscoe assumed senior status on March 15, 2021.

== Notes ==
Legal offices
| Preceded by James Kenneth Logan | Judge of the United States Court of Appeals for the Tenth Circuit; 1995–2021 | Succeeded by Richard Federico |
| Preceded by Robert Harlan Henry | Chief Judge of the United States Court of Appeals for the Tenth Circuit; 2010–2015 | Succeeded by Timothy Tymkovich |
