= David Thomas Lewis =

American judge (1912–1983)

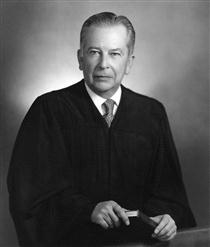

Senior Judge of the United States Court of Appeals for the Tenth Circuit
- In office December 3, 1977 – September 28, 1983

Chief Judge of the United States Court of Appeals for the Tenth Circuit
- In office May 1, 1970 – December 3, 1977
- Preceded by: Alfred P. Murrah
- Succeeded by: Oliver Seth

Judge of the United States Court of Appeals for the Tenth Circuit
- In office June 5, 1956 – December 3, 1977
- Appointed by: Dwight D. Eisenhower
- Preceded by: Orie Leon Phillips
- Succeeded by: Monroe G. McKay

Personal details
- Born: David Thomas Lewis; April 25, 1912 Salt Lake City, Utah, U.S.
- Died: September 28, 1983 (aged 71) Salt Lake City, Utah, U.S.
- Party: Republican
- Education: University of Utah (BA); S.J. Quinney College of Law (JD)

David Thomas Lewis (April 25, 1912 – September 28, 1983) was a United States circuit judge of the United States Court of Appeals for the Tenth Circuit.

== Education and career ==
Born in Salt Lake City, Utah, Lewis received a Bachelor of Arts degree from the University of Utah in 1935 and a Juris Doctor from the S.J. Quinney College of Law at the University of Utah in 1937. He was in private practice in Salt Lake City from 1938 to 1950. He was in the United States Army after World War II, from April 1945 to January 1946 where he joined as a private and served in the Criminal Investigation Division. He was a member of the Utah House of Representatives from 1947 to 1948. He was a Utah state district judge from 1950 to 1956.

== Federal judicial service ==
Lewis was nominated by President Dwight D. Eisenhower on May 17, 1956, to a seat on the United States Court of Appeals for the Tenth Circuit vacated by Judge Orie Leon Phillips. He was confirmed by the United States Senate on June 4, 1956, and received his commission on June 5, 1956. He served as Chief Judge and a member of the Judicial Conference of the United States from May 1, 1970 to December 3, 1977. He assumed senior status on December 3, 1977. Lewis served in that capacity until his death on September 28, 1983, in Salt Lake City.

== Sources ==
Legal offices
Preceded by Orie Leon Phillips	Judge of the United States Court of Appeals for the Tenth Circuit; 1956–1977	Succeeded by Monroe G. McKay
Preceded by Alfred P. Murrah	Chief Judge of the United States Court of Appeals for the Tenth Circuit; 1970–1977	Succeeded by Oliver Seth
