= Monroe G. McKay =

American judge (1928–2020)

Senior Judge of the United States Court of Appeals for the Tenth Circuit
- In office December 31, 1993 – March 28, 2020

Chief Judge of the United States Court of Appeals for the Tenth Circuit
- In office September 16, 1991 – December 31, 1993
- Preceded by: William Judson Holloway Jr.
- Succeeded by: Stephanie Kulp Seymour

Judge of the United States Court of Appeals for the Tenth Circuit
- In office December 1, 1977 – December 31, 1993
- Appointed by: Jimmy Carter
- Preceded by: David Thomas Lewis
- Succeeded by: Michael R. Murphy

Personal details
- Born: Monroe Gunn McKay; May 30, 1928 Huntsville, Utah, U.S.
- Died: March 28, 2020 (aged 91) Orem, Utah, U.S.
- Education: Brigham Young University (BS); University of Chicago Law School (JD)

Monroe Gunn McKay (May 30, 1928 – March 28, 2020) was a United States circuit judge of the United States Court of Appeals for the Tenth Circuit.

== Early life and education ==
McKay was born in Huntsville, Utah in 1928. McKay served in the United States Marine Corps from 1946 to 1948. In 1950 McKay served as a missionary for the Church of Jesus Christ of Latter-day Saints in South Africa, returning home in 1952. McKay received a Bachelor of Science degree from Brigham Young University in 1957 and a J.D. degree from the University of Chicago Law School in 1960. He was a member of several different organizations, such as Phi Kappa Phi honor society, Order of the Coif, the American Judicature Society, and the American Law Institute.

== Career ==
McKay began his legal career as a law clerk to State Supreme Court Justice Jesse Addison Udall of the Supreme Court of Arizona from 1960 to 1961, before becoming a private attorney licensed in the State of Arizona. He was an associate at the Phoenix, Arizona law firm of Lewis and Roca from 1961 to 1966. He became a partner in 1968 and continued working there until 1974. From 1966 to 1968, McKay went overseas to be the Director of the United States Peace Corps based in Malawi, Africa. McKay also worked in the academic arena as a law professor at the J. Reuben Clark Law School at Brigham Young University from 1976 to 1977.

=== Federal judicial service ===
On November 2, 1977, McKay was nominated by President Jimmy Carter to a seat on the United States Court of Appeals for the Tenth Circuit vacated by Judge David Thomas Lewis. He was confirmed by the United States Senate on November 29, 1977, and received his commission on December 1, 1977. He served as Chief Judge from September 16, 1991, until he assumed senior status on December 31, 1993. He remained a senior judge until he died on March 28, 2020, aged 91.

=== Selected opinions ===
==== YOTL v Savage ====
McKay served on a three-judge panel in the case of Yes on Term Limits v Savage which was a federal lawsuit challenging Oklahoma's residency requirements for petition circulators. On December 18, 2008, McKay and his fellow judges issued a unanimous decision in the case, saying that Oklahoma's residency restriction is an unconstitutional violation of First Amendment speech rights. The decision of the Tenth Circuit overturned a lower federal court decision. This decision was significant because it was third federal circuit court decision that invalidated a state residency requirement in 2008, preceded by the Sixth Circuit ruling that Michigan's residency requirement is unconstitutional in Bogaert v. Land in August, and the Ninth Circuit ruling that Arizona's residency requirement is unconstitutional in Nader v. Brewer in July.

==== Environment ====
In Southern Utah Wilderness Alliance v BLM SUWA was seeking to close some proposed wilderness areas in Utah to off-road vehicles. The Tenth Circuit said in a split decision that the federal court in Utah erred when it decided it lacked the jurisdiction to order the U.S. Bureau of Land Management to close the roads and remanded the case to district court for a de novo trial. The judges rejected the BLM's arguments about the scope of its discretion under federal wilderness laws and its assertion that courts don't have jurisdiction over the agency's daily decisions. The appeals court focused mainly on whether the U.S. District Court in Utah can get involved in the dispute. The appeals court did not address whether allowing off-road vehicle use will harm the proposed wilderness areas. The sites have been declared eligible to be federal wilderness areas. Under federal law, they must be managed as if they were official wilderness areas until Congress decides what to do with them. Motor vehicles, development, and other activities are off-limits in wilderness areas. In a separate opinion, Judge Monroe McKay said the district court lacked jurisdiction in the dispute but environmental laws allow the groups to pursue their claims through the public comment process. The court decision resulted in the issuance of new guidelines to assist government land managers regarding roads across federally owned lands.

==== Education ====
In 1989, in Brown v. Board of Education of Topeka Shawnee County Kansas, a Federal appeals panel issued a revised opinion saying that the city of Topeka had not done enough to desegregate its schools since a 1954 U.S. Supreme court decision in Brown v. Board of Education. Judges Stephanie Seymour and Monroe McKay overturned, in a 2-to-1 ruling, a 1987 ruling by Federal District Judge Richard Rogers that Topeka schools were not responsible for lingering segregation because the Board of Education had not intended to keep the schools segregated. In the majority opinion, Judge Seymour wrote that Judge Rogers "erred by limiting the school district's burden merely to showing that it had nondiscriminatory reasons for acting as it did. As 30 years of desegregation law have made clear, the Constitution requires more than ceasing to promote segregation." The Tenth Circuit decision was subsequently vacated by the U.S. Supreme Court, which remanded the case to reconsider in light of recent Supreme Court decisions. On remand the Tenth Circuit reinstated its prior opinion in full, holding that the recent Supreme Court decisions did not dictate a different outcome. The supreme court declined review so the case returned to the district court, which issued a final order in 1999 dismissing the case.

==== Negligence ====
In 1987, the case of Allen v. United States was heard by judges McKay, Seth and Logan. They overturned a Federal judge's ruling that government negligence in above-ground nuclear weapon tests from 1951 to 1962 caused cancer in some residents downwind from the Nevada test sites. After reviewing the case for more than 15 months, the three judges ruled unanimously that the Government could not be held liable for injuries suffered as a result of discretionary decision-making powers given the Atomic Energy Commission under the law. More than a thousand plaintiffs had filed lawsuits against the Government contending that radioactive fallout from the atomic tests had caused about 500 deaths and injuries. "While we have great sympathy for the individual cancer victims who have borne alone the costs of the A.E.C.'s choices, their plight is a matter for Congress," McKay wrote in an opinion that was part of the ruling.

==== Judicial philosophy ====
McKay holds that the judiciary provides the cement that keeps a diversified society together. This means that though the judiciary is by nature conservative, occasionally it must strike out boldly. The prime responsibility of a judge is to maintain his integrity, and such integrity is essential in a system where the courts may be called upon to tell the rest of the country they cannot deprive an individual of his or her rights.

== Personal life ==
McKay met his wife, Lucille A. Kinnison, during his undergraduate years at BYU and married her on August 6, 1954. They had nine children, five daughters and four sons. He was a brother to Quinn G. McKay and K. Gunn McKay.

== See also ==
- List of United States federal judges by longevity of service

Legal offices
Preceded by David Thomas Lewis	Judge of the United States Court of Appeals for the Tenth Circuit; 1977–1993	Succeeded by Michael R. Murphy
Preceded by William Judson Holloway Jr.	Chief Judge of the United States Court of Appeals for the Tenth Circuit; 1991–1993	Succeeded by Stephanie Kulp Seymour
