= Odie B. Faulk =

American historian

Odie B. Faulk (born August 26, 1933, in Winnsboro, Texas) is a historian who specializes in the history of the U.S. Southwest. Credited with writing or co-authoring more than fifty books, he is a professor emeritus of history at Northeastern Oklahoma State University.

== Biography ==
Faulk pursued his education as a historian at Texas Tech University, progressing through Texas Tech to the Ph.D. level. He then pursued a teaching and writing career at Texas A&M, the University of Arizona, Arizona State University, and Arizona Western College. He became head of the History Department at Oklahoma State University in 1972.

Faulk has donated some of his papers to his alma mater. Covering work undertaken from 1960 through 1973, the personal archive is stored in the Southwest Collection of the Special Collections Library at Texas Tech.
