= Robert Harlan Henry =

American judge (born 1953)

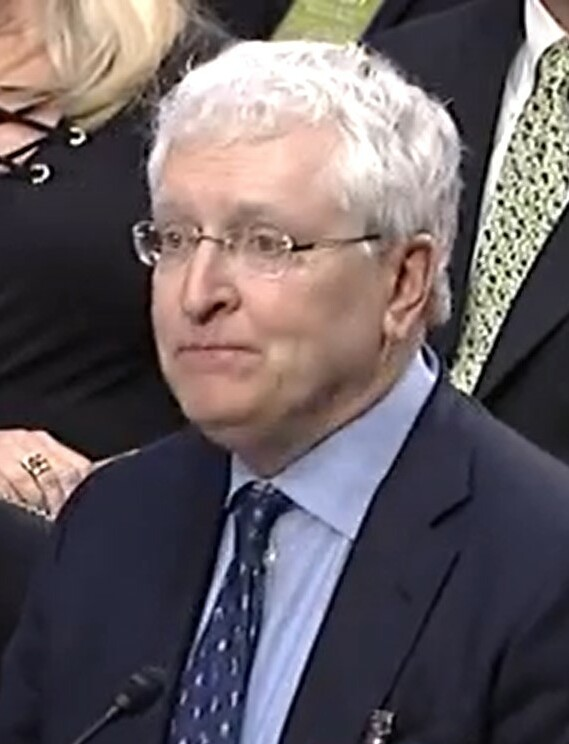
- Henry in 2017

President of Oklahoma City University
- In office July 1, 2010 – 2018
- Preceded by: Tom McDaniel
- Succeeded by: Martha A. Burger

Chief Judge of the United States Court of Appeals for the Tenth Circuit
- In office January 25, 2008 – April 30, 2010
- Preceded by: Deanell Reece Tacha
- Succeeded by: Mary Beck Briscoe

Judge of the United States Court of Appeals for the Tenth Circuit
- In office May 9, 1994 – June 30, 2010
- Appointed by: Bill Clinton
- Preceded by: William Judson Holloway Jr.
- Succeeded by: Robert E. Bacharach

Dean of the Oklahoma City University School of Law
- In office 1991–1993

14th Attorney General of Oklahoma
- In office January 12, 1987 – June 22, 1991
- Governor: Henry Bellmon; David Walters
- Preceded by: Mike Turpen
- Succeeded by: Susan B. Loving

Member of the Oklahoma House of Representatives
- In office 1977 – January 12, 1987

Personal details
- Born: Robert Harlan Henry; April 3, 1953 (age 73) Shawnee, Oklahoma, U.S.
- Party: Democratic
- Education: University of Oklahoma (BA, JD)

Robert Harlan Henry (born April 3, 1953) is a former United States Circuit Judge and politician from Oklahoma, and was the 17th President of Oklahoma City University. He is a member of the Democratic Party. Henry formerly served as the Attorney General of Oklahoma from 1986 to 1991, before resigning early in his second term to become the dean of the Oklahoma City University School of Law, where he remained until 1994. President Bill Clinton appointed Henry as a United States circuit judge of the United States Court of Appeals for the Tenth Circuit, a position he held until he resigned in 2010 to return to Oklahoma City University as president. He retired as President of Oklahoma City University in 2018, and has since worked as an attorney specializing in mediation, moot courts, and appellate advocacy.

== Education and legal career ==
Henry was born in Shawnee, Oklahoma, Henry was named by Senator Barry Goldwater and Ernest "Fritz" Hollings as the national winner of the Elks Leadership Award during his high school years. Oklahoma Senators Fred R. Harris and Henry Bellmon also selected Henry as a William Randolph Hearst Foundation Scholar. He earned his Bachelor of Arts degree (with high honors) from the University of Oklahoma in 1974 and his Juris Doctor from the University of Oklahoma College of Law in 1976. While attending law school, he was appointed Attorney General for the university student association, and was elected to the Oklahoma House of Representatives, where he served until 1986. In 1986, he was elected Attorney General of Oklahoma, defeating Republican Brian C. Griffin. He was re-elected in November 1990 but resigned in June 1991 to become the dean of Oklahoma City University School of Law. Oklahoma Governor David Walters appointed Henry's first assistant attorney general, Susan B. Loving, to succeed him as attorney general. Henry continued to serve as Dean until 1993.

== Federal judicial service ==
Henry was nominated by President Bill Clinton on February 9, 1994, to a seat on the United States Court of Appeals for the Tenth Circuit vacated by Judge William Judson Holloway Jr. He was confirmed by the Senate on May 6, 1994, and received commission on May 9, 1994. He served as Chief Judge from 2008 to 2010. He resigned on June 30, 2010. Henry is a cousin of former Oklahoma Governor Brad Henry, and administered the oath of office at the governor's inauguration in 2003.

During his service, Henry's judicial committees and activities included the United States Judicial Conference Committee on International Judicial Relations. He was named by United States Supreme Court Chief Justice William Rehnquist as chair in 2005. In 2004, he served as part of a six-member delegation, led by Supreme Court Justice Sandra Day O'Connor, which represented the United States Judiciary at the Arab Judicial Forum.

== Academic career ==
On December 10, 2010, Henry was named 17th president and CEO of Oklahoma City University, a private Methodist affiliated university with a student body of 3,700 undergraduate and graduate students. Henry became President Emeritus of Oklahoma City University in 2018, and is now in the private practice of law specializing in mediation and arbitration, conducting moot courts, and consulting on appellate advocacy.

Henry is a very active civic, philanthropic, and business leader. He serves on the boards of directors for Devon Energy, Allied Arts OKC, AMAR International Charitable Foundation in the US, Greater OKC Chamber, iCivics, Jasmine Moran Foundation Children's Museum, Oklahoma Hall of Fame, Oklahoma Medical Research Foundation, and the State Fair of Oklahoma. A life member of the National Conference of Commissioners on Uniform State Laws, Henry also has been active in the American Bar Association. His professional associations include the Council on Foreign Relations, Oklahoma Bar Association, American Law Institute, Alpha Chi National College Honor Scholarship Society and Phi Beta Kappa. He is an Independent Baptist.

== Awards and recognition ==
Henry was awarded an Honorary Doctor of Laws Degree from Oklahoma City University in 2000 and an Honorary Doctor of Humane Letters from the University of Tulsa in 2006.

He has presented numerous lectures at law schools in the United States and abroad, including the 2010 Madison Lecture at New York University and the 2011 Pedrick Lecture at Arizona State University School of Law. His scholarship has been published in numerous law reviews and by the university presses of Oxford, Nebraska, and Oklahoma. He has also published widely in magazines and newspapers. He authored the "Living Our Traditions" chapter in "The Embattled Constitution," published in 2013 by New York University Press.

Among his honors are Leadership Oklahoma's 2015 Lifetime Achievement Award, the Dalsimer Dean's Award by the Pepperdine School of Law, the Annual Human Rights Award by the Oklahoma Human Rights Commission, the A.C. Hamlin Award by the National Black Caucus of State Legislators, and the Humanitarian of the Year Award by the National Conference of Christians and Jews. In 2016, Kiowa Elder Bud Sahmaunt presented Henry with an honorary membership in the Kiowa Tribe of Oklahoma. He delivered the University of Oklahoma commencement address on May 12, 2017.

Party political offices
Preceded by Mike Turpen	Democratic nominee for Attorney General of Oklahoma; 1986, 1990	Succeeded by Drew Edmondson
Legal offices
Preceded by Mike Turpen	Attorney General of Oklahoma; 1987–1991	Succeeded by Susan B. Loving
Preceded by William Judson Holloway Jr.	Judge of the United States Court of Appeals for the Tenth Circuit; 1994–2010	Succeeded by Robert E. Bacharach
Preceded by Deanell Reece Tacha	Chief Judge of the United States Court of Appeals for the Tenth Circuit; 2008–2010	Succeeded by Mary Beck Briscoe
Academic offices
Preceded by Tom McDaniel	President of Oklahoma City University; 2010–2018	Succeeded by Martha A. Burger
