= TaxProf Blog =

Law blog

- Owner: Law Professor Blogs
- Founder: Paul Caron
- Editor: Paul Caron
- Website: taxprof.typepad.com
- Launched: April 2004; 22 years ago
- Current status: Inactive

TaxProf Blog was a popular collaborative blog about United States tax law written by law school professors. It was active from 2004 to 2025.

== History ==
TaxProf Blog was established in April 2004 by Paul Caron, professor of law at Pepperdine University. According to Reuters, it was "an influential early entrant in the constellation of law professor blogs that flourished in the mid-2000s through the 2010s".

In a post to TaxProfBlog on September 8, 2025, Canon announced he would shutter the site effective September 30 of that year. The move coincided with the termination of the TypePad platform on which it was hosted.

== Content ==
TaxProf Blog was a collaborative blog written by Caron and other law school professors. It reported on current events and precedential cases in U.S. tax law.

Posts on TaxProf Blog were widely cited in the popular press and legal journals. Its reporting was sourced by USA Today, the Washington Post, Above the Law, law.com, and other outlets. It achieved popularity in the academic community and came to be regarded as academia's leading tax blog.

== Reception ==
In 2010, the blog was named to a list of ABA Journal 's "favorite" legal blogs. The blog has been described by law experts Benjamin H. Barton and Christopher M. Fairman as a "must read" and as a "wonderful blog" by Edward McCaffery.

== See also ==
- Groklaw
