= Timothy Tymkovich =

American judge (born 1956)

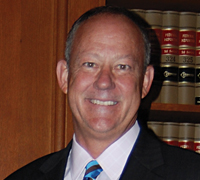

Senior Judge of the United States Court of Appeals for the Tenth Circuit
- Incumbent
- Assumed office November 16, 2026

Judge of the United States Foreign Intelligence Surveillance Court of Review
- Incumbent
- Assumed office November 1, 2023
- Appointed by: John Roberts
- Preceded by: David B. Sentelle

Chief Judge of the United States Court of Appeals for the Tenth Circuit
- In office October 1, 2015 – October 1, 2022
- Preceded by: Mary Beck Briscoe
- Succeeded by: Jerome Holmes

Judge of the United States Court of Appeals for the Tenth Circuit
- In office April 1, 2003 – November 16, 2026
- Appointed by: George W. Bush
- Preceded by: John Carbone Porfilio
- Succeeded by: Daniel D. Domenico (designate)

Personal details
- Born: Timothy Michael Tymkovich; 1956 (age 69–70) Denver, Colorado, U.S.
- Education: Colorado College (BA); University of Colorado, Boulder (JD)

Timothy Michael Tymkovich (born 1956) is an American lawyer serving as a senior United States circuit judge of the United States Court of Appeals for the Tenth Circuit; he served as the court's chief judge from 2015 to 2022. In November 2023, he was designated by Chief Justice John Roberts to serve as a judge of the United States Foreign Intelligence Surveillance Court of Review.

== Early life and education ==
Born in Denver, Colorado, Tymkovich is a third-generation Coloradan. His great-grandfather emigrated from Ukraine to the United States via Ellis Island and worked as a miner.

Tymkovich graduated from Colorado College in 1979 with a Bachelor of Arts. He then attended the University of Colorado Law School, where he was an editor of the University of Colorado Law Review. He graduated in 1982 with a Juris Doctor degree.

== Career ==
After law school, Tymkovich was a law clerk for chief justice William Erickson of the Colorado Supreme Court from 1982 to 1983. From 1983 to 1991, Tymkovich worked in private practice in Denver and Washington, D.C. In 1991, Colorado Attorney General Gale Norton appointed him Solicitor General of the State of Colorado.

Tymkovich served in that position until 1996, arguing several cases in front of the Supreme Court of the United States. Most notably, in Romer v. Evans (1996), he unsuccessfully argued that Colorado's Amendment 2 (which revoked local legal protections for members of the LGBT community) was not unconstitutional under the Fourteenth Amendment's Equal Protection Clause. He then returned to private practice in Denver.

=== Federal judicial service ===
President George W. Bush initially nominated Tymkovich to the seat on the Tenth Circuit on May 25, 2001, and renominated him on January 7, 2003. He was nominated to a seat vacated by Judge John Carbone Porfilio, who assumed senior status. President Bill Clinton had nominated Christine Arguello to the seat, but she never received a hearing or a vote from the United States Senate. The Senate confirmed Tymkovich on April 1, 2003, by a 58–41 vote. He received his commission the same day. He was the chief judge from October 1, 2015, to October 1, 2022. He assumed senior status on November 16, 2026.

In September 2016, Tymkovich and his circuit colleague Neil Gorsuch were named as possible U.S. Supreme Court nominees by Republican presidential candidate Donald Trump. In 2018, Tymkovich was tasked with reviewing more than a dozen ethics complaints filed against U.S. Supreme Court Justice Brett Kavanaugh.

In 2001, Kavanaugh had helped lobby for Tymkovich to be appointed as a federal judge.

On November 1, 2023, he was designated by Chief Justice John Roberts to serve as a judge of the United States Foreign Intelligence Surveillance Court of Review.

=== Notable cases ===
United States v. McCane, 573 F.3d 1037 (10th Cir. 2009): Markice McCane was convicted of being a felon in possession of a firearm in violation of 18 U.S.C. § 922(g)(1). On appeal, he contended that the felon-in-possession statute was unconstitutional in light of District of Columbia v. Heller (2008). But the Tenth Circuit affirmed the conviction after noting the statement in Heller that "nothing in our opinion should be taken to cast doubt on longstanding prohibitions on the possession of firearms by felons." In a concurring opinion, Judge Tymkovich expressed concern that the statement "short-circuits at least some of the analysis and refinement that would otherwise take place in the lower courts," particularly since the statement was based on a possibly questionable premise—that the felon-in-possession prohibition was longstanding.

Guttman v. Khalsa, 669 F.3d 1101 (10th Cir. 2012): Dr. Stuart Guttman brought suit under Title II of the Americans with Disabilities Act of 1990 after the New Mexico Board of Medical Examiners revoked his medical license. In an opinion written by Judge Tymkovich, the Tenth Circuit held that the Eleventh Amendment protected States from lawsuits based on professional licensing decisions.

United States v. Strandlof, 667 F.3d 1146 (10th Cir. 2012): Rick Glen Strandlof was convicted of violating the Stolen Valor Act of 2005, 18 U.S.C. § 704(b), which makes it illegal to falsely claim to have received a military award or honor. In an opinion written by Judge Tymkovich, the Tenth Circuit held that the First Amendment does not protect knowingly false statements of fact. In United States v. Alvarez (2012), a plurality of the Supreme Court held that the Act was unconstitutional, although a majority of justices held that lies about easily verifiable facts (e.g., receiving military honors) are outside the core of First Amendment protection.

Hobby Lobby Stores v. Sebelius, 723 F.3d 1114 (10th Cir. 2013): The court found for-profit corporations Hobby Lobby and Mardel Christian Bookstores could assert religious freedom as "persons" under the Religious Freedom Restoration Act. Judge Tymkovich wrote for the five-judge en banc majority, over a three-judge dissent. The decision was upheld by a five-justice majority of the U.S. Supreme Court in Burwell v. Hobby Lobby Stores, Inc. (2014).

Endrew F. v. Douglas County School Dist. RE–1, 798 F.3d 1329 (10th Cir. 2015): In a case where the parents of Endrew F., a child with autism, appealed to the court in an effort to be reimbursed for private school tuition resulting from lack of Free Appropriate Public Education (FAPE) under the Individuals with Disabilities Education Act (IDEA) their school district gave their child, the court ruled in an opinion by Tymkovich that Endrew had received "some educational benefit" (as per Board of Education v. Rowley) and had thus received FAPE and did not qualify for reimbursement. This case was successfully appealed to the Supreme Court; the justices found that the way in which the 10th Circuit determined whether Endrew had received FAPE was wrong, remanding the case back to the lower courts for review.

== See also ==
- Donald Trump Supreme Court candidates
- List of Ukrainian Americans

Legal offices
Preceded by John Carbone Porfilio	Judge of the United States Court of Appeals for the Tenth Circuit; 2003–2026	Succeeded by Daniel D. Domenico; Designate
Preceded by Mary Beck Briscoe	Chief Judge of the United States Court of Appeals for the Tenth Circuit; 2015–2022	Succeeded by Jerome Holmes
Preceded by David B. Sentelle	Judge of the United States Foreign Intelligence Surveillance Court of Review; 2023–present	Incumbent
