= William Judson Holloway Jr. =

American judge (1923–2014)

Senior Judge of the United States Court of Appeals for the Tenth Circuit
- In office May 31, 1992 – April 25, 2014

Chief Judge of the United States Court of Appeals for the Tenth Circuit
- In office September 15, 1984 – September 16, 1991
- Preceded by: Oliver Seth
- Succeeded by: Monroe G. McKay

Judge of the United States Court of Appeals for the Tenth Circuit
- In office September 16, 1968 – May 31, 1992
- Appointed by: Lyndon B. Johnson
- Preceded by: Seat established by 82 Stat. 184
- Succeeded by: Robert Harlan Henry

Personal details
- Born: June 23, 1923 Hugo, Oklahoma, U.S.
- Died: April 25, 2014 (aged 90) Oklahoma City, Oklahoma, U.S.
- Parents: William J. Holloway (father); Amy Arnold Holloway (mother)
- Education: University of Oklahoma (AB); Harvard Law School (LLB)

William Judson Holloway Jr. (June 23, 1923 – April 25, 2014) was a United States circuit judge of the United States Court of Appeals for the Tenth Circuit.

== Education and career ==
Born in Hugo, Oklahoma, Holloway graduated from Classen High School in Oklahoma City, Oklahoma in 1941. He was in the United States Army during World War II, from 1943 to 1947 and became a first lieutenant. He received his undergraduate degree from the University of Oklahoma in 1947 and a Bachelor of Laws from Harvard Law School in 1950. He was in private practice in Oklahoma City, Oklahoma from 1950 to 1951. He was an attorney in the General Litigation Section of the Claims Division of the United States Department of Justice in Washington, D.C. from 1951 to 1952. He returned to private practice in Oklahoma City from 1952 to 1968.

== Federal judicial service ==
Holloway was nominated by President Lyndon B. Johnson on August 2, 1968, to the United States Court of Appeals for the Tenth Circuit, to a new seat created by 82 Stat. 184. He was confirmed by the United States Senate on September 13, 1968, and received his commission on September 16, 1968. He served as Chief Judge from September 15, 1984, to September 16, 1991. He assumed senior status on May 31, 1992. His service terminated on April 25, 2014, due to his death of a respiratory ailment in Oklahoma City.

== Honor ==
The William J. Holloway Jr. United States Courthouse was named for him in 2016.

Actor Ben Carlson plays Judge Holloway in the 2018 film On the Basis of Sex, about the life and early cases of Supreme Court Justice Ruth Bader Ginsburg.

The Oklahoma City University Law Review published a memorial issue in honor of his death in 2014.

== See also ==
- List of United States federal judges by longevity of service

Legal offices
Preceded by Seat established by 82 Stat. 184	Judge of the United States Court of Appeals for the Tenth Circuit; 1968–1992	Succeeded by Robert Harlan Henry
Preceded by Oliver Seth	Chief Judge of the United States Court of Appeals for the Tenth Circuit; 1984–1991	Succeeded by Monroe G. McKay
