= Kennamer =

Kennamer is a surname. Notable people with the surname include:

- Charles Brents Kennamer (1874–1955), American judge
- Franklin Elmore Kennamer (1879–1960), American judge
- Seaborn Kennamer (1830–1915), American politician
