= Sven Erik Holmes =

American judge (born 1951)

Chief Judge of the United States District Court for the Northern District of Oklahoma
- In office 2003–2005
- Preceded by: Terence C. Kern
- Succeeded by: Claire Eagan

Judge of the United States District Court for the Northern District of Oklahoma
- In office November 21, 1994 – March 13, 2005
- Appointed by: Bill Clinton
- Preceded by: James O. Ellison
- Succeeded by: Gregory Kent Frizzell

Personal details
- Born: Sven Erik Holmes; February 13, 1951 (age 75) Grand Junction, Colorado, U.S.
- Spouse: Lois Romano
- Parents: Clifford Holmes (father); Ruth Holmes (mother)
- Education: Harvard University (AB); University of Virginia (JD); Georgetown University (LLM)

Sven Erik Holmes is an American attorney and jurist who served as United States District Judge of the United States District Court for the Northern District of Oklahoma from 1994 to 2005.

After leaving the Judiciary, Holmes became the Vice Chairman, Legal, Risk and Regulatory, and Chief Legal Officer for global accounting firm KPMG. At KPMG, he directed the office of general counsel, risk management, government affairs, security, and ethics and compliance programs. He was also counsel to the board of directors, and a member of the management committee. In 2009, Ethicsphere named him one of America's 100 most influential people in business ethics. In 2007, Accounting Today named him one of the "Top 100 Most Influential People in Accounting." Also in 2007, Homes was elected as a fellow of the National Academy of Public Administration. In 2014, National Law Journal named him "America's 50 Outstanding General Counsel." In 2018, Holmes received the "Scales of Justice Award" from Equal Justice Works, a "nonprofit organization that brings together an extensive network of law students, lawyers, legal services organizations, and supporters to promote a lifelong commitment to public service and equal justice."

== Early life and education ==
Born in Grand Junction, Colorado, and raised in Bartlesville, Oklahoma, Holmes received his Artium Baccalaureus degree from Harvard University in 1973, a Juris Doctor from the University of Virginia School of Law in 1980, and a Master of Laws (Taxation) from Georgetown University Law Center in 1987. He served as a law clerk to United States District Judge Thomas Rutherford Brett from 1980 to 1981.

== Career ==
Previously, Holmes was a partner at the law firm of Williams & Connolly in Washington, D.C., was staff director and general counsel to the Senate Select Committee on Intelligence from 1987 to 1989, Vice President of the Baltimore Orioles from 1989 to 1993, and administrative assistant to Governor David L. Boren of Oklahoma from 1975 to 1977. He also taught constitutional law as an adjunct professor at the University of Tulsa College of Law from 1999 to 2005.

He currently sits on the Board of Trustees of St Mary's College of Maryland, and the Board of Trustees of Ford's Theatre.

=== Federal judicial service ===
Holmes was nominated by President Bill Clinton on September 22, 1994, to a seat vacated by Judge James O. Ellison. He was confirmed by the United States Senate on October 7, 1994, and received commission on November 21, 1994. In 2001, Chief Justice William Rehnquist appointed him to the Budget Committee for the Judicial Conference of the United States, where he served as vice chair from 2004 to 2005. The Budget Committee consults with Judicial Conference committees to formulate and submit for approval by the Conference's annual budget; it then presents the budget to the United States Congress. He served as chief judge from 2003 to 2005. His resigned from the court on March 13, 2005.

From 2016 to 2018, he served as chairman of the board for the Council for Court Excellence in Washington, D.C.

== Personal life ==
Holmes lives in Washington, D.C. with his wife Lois Romano, a longtime journalist with The Washington Post and the author of a New York Times bestselling biography of Mary Todd Lincoln. <>

== Sources ==
Legal offices
Preceded by James O. Ellison	Judge of the United States District Court for the Northern District of Oklahoma; 1994–2005	Succeeded by Gregory Kent Frizzell
Preceded by Terence C. Kern	Chief Judge of the United States District Court for the Northern District of Oklahoma; 2003–2005	Succeeded by Claire Eagan
