= What Waits Below =

- Directed by: Don Sharp
- Screenplay by: Christy Marx; Robert Vincent O'Neill
- Story by: Freddie Francis (as Ken Barnett)
- Produced by: Robert D. Bailey; Sandy Howard
- Starring: Robert Powell; Timothy Bottoms; Lisa Blount; Richard Johnson; Anne Heywood
- Cinematography: Virgil L. Harper; Claude Agostini (uncredited)
- Edited by: John R. Bowey
- Music by: Denny Jaeger; Michel Rubini
- Production company: Adam's Apple Films
- Distributed by: Spartan/Republic Entertainment International
- Release date: 16 November 1984 (U.S.)
- Running time: 88 minutes
- Countries: United Kingdom; United States
- Language: English
- Budget: $5.5–6 million

What Waits Below, also known as Secrets of the Phantom Caverns, is a 1984 British-American fantasy adventure film directed by Don Sharp, and starring Robert Powell, Timothy Bottoms and Lisa Blount. In it, a group of soldiers enter a cave to plant an electronic transmitter, but encounter humanoids who have evolved differently, and may be the last survivors of the lost Lemurian civilization. It was Sharp's final theatrical film. It was shot under the title Secrets of the Phantom Caverns, which it kept in the U.K. and some international markets, but premiered in the U.S. as What Waits Below.

== Plot ==
The U.S. military is running a test for a special type of radio transmitter, to be used to communicate with submarines in a deep system of caves in Central America. Also in the area is a team of scientists investigating and gathering ancient cultural relics found in the area around the caves and cenotes (sink holes). The team's leader, Dr Ben Gannon feels the culture predates the Mayans and he wishes to explore further into the caves. Major Elbert Stevens and the Belizean representative Major Castillo want the team out after the deep caverns in the region are confirmed to be ideal for the equipment testing. A team of two is sent deep into the cave system to conduct the first tests. When the signal from one of the transmitters suddenly disappears, Major Stevens asks Rupert 'Wolf' Wolfsen, a British spelunker/explorer who is in the region to lead a small team of soldiers led by the major Wolfsen encourages the major to include the scientific team which includes Leslie Peterson, and Santos Arias, a local to guide the search team sent into the familiar cave system. Exploring deep underground, they find fragments of machinery, an old skeleton, a cave beast and a tribe of albino cave-dwellers who have apparently been isolated from the rest of the world for thousands of years. The cave-dwellers are hurt by radio frequencies and are able to see in infrared frequencies, tracking the explorers by their body heat.

== Cast ==
- Robert Powell as Rupert 'Wolf' Wolfsen
- Timothy Bottoms as Major Elbert Stevens
- Lisa Blount as Leslie Peterson
- Richard Johnson as Ben Gannon
- Anne Heywood as Frieda Shelley
- A.C. Weary as Lt. George Barwell
- Jackson Bostwick as Hunter Prime
- Richard Beauchamp as Santos Arias
- William Gribble as Sgt. Neumann
- Carl Spurlock as Major Castillo
- Jason Laskay as Hunter Second
- Liam Sullivan as Lemurian Elder
- Gary Carlos Cervantes as Hector Lopez
- Tim Powell as Jim White

== Production ==
=== Development ===
The film had the working title The Primitives. The story is credited to Ken Barnett, the usual pseudonym of Trog director and Sandy Howard collaborator Freddie Francis. Sandy Howard invited Robert D. Bailey, whose background was in special effects, to join him as a producer on the film. The production used a legal entity called Wishred, based in Culver City, California. Howard wanted to shoot the film in a real cavern to give the film "a special beauty and grandeur that has taken over one million years to develop, and which no Hollywood set could ever dare hope to recreate." Italy, Yugoslavia and the U.S. were successively considered as locations.

The film was announced to start in April 1983, before being delayed. Until late into pre-production, Yugoslavia was the shoot's likely location, and the Postojna Caves (in what is today Slovenia) had been worked into the script. When the production retreated the U.S., Kentucky's Mammoth Cave and New Mexico's Carlsbad Caverns were scouted, before the final locations were announced in June 1983. Alabama's Cathedral Caverns were chosen for their size and rock formations, while Tennessee's Cumberland Caverns were selected for their intricate layout. In the last stages of pre-production, the story was set in Spain rather than Latin America, a detail that remains the synopsis given with some releases.

Some sources mention that John Hough was considered as director before Don Sharp signed on. Claude Agostini was hired as cinematographer thanks to his work on the similar Quest for Fire, and brought some of his French crew with him. The film was originally going to be shot in 70 mm, but instead used the more traditional 35 mm format. Robert Powell made his American debut with the film, although he had already worked with director Sharp in the U.K., as had co-star Richard Johnson. Timothy Bottoms said he took the role to work with producer Sandy Howard. Lisa Blount joined the cast shortly before the beginning of photography. Robert Ginty was announced as one of the leads, but he does not appear.

=== Filming ===
Filming started in on August 8, 1983. Two weeks and a half were spent in the North Alabama, mostly at the Cathedral Caverns near Grant, but also at Three Caves, a former limestone quarry in Huntsville. The crew then moved to the McMinnville, Tennessee, area for two weeks at Cumberland Caverns and the nearby Fall Creek Falls. In early September the crew south moved to Sherwood for the final stretch of location filming. Finished this past week in Cumberland Caverns. Some studio work also took place in Los Angeles. By early October, it was noted that the film had "recently completed production."

80 percent of the film was shot inside the caves. Lisa Blount said: "We would go into the caverns before dawn, stay there all day, and come out at night, so we never saw the sunlight, except for Sunday. " Don Sharp said that the crew spent as much as 14 hours straight in the cave. While this offered an agreeable summer temperature of just 56 °F (13 °C), it made lighting technically demanding. Some 200 fake stalactites and other rocks were made to hide cables and rigs, which had to be constantly repainted to account for changes in the sunlight that filtered into some of the rooms. To simulate the cave's fictional illumination by glowworms, Agostini had the idea to float up large helium balloons to act as reflectors. While Sharp enjoyed the French crew's work, they could only muster about 1½ to 2 minutes of footage per day, which was too slow for the producers. As a result Agostini was let go, and he is uncredited in the finished film. As the film was shot non union in right to work states, there was nothing he could do.

Cathedral Caverns was the most difficult of the two main sites, as filming took place one mile into the tunnels. The transportation of the nearly 8 tons worth of equipment required 50 crew members. It was disrupted during week one, when a temporary bridge threatened to break under the weight of a Jeep. Deeper into the cave was a 2½ foot wide ledge was too narrow even for the production's golf carts. Additionally, the rare exteriors were disrupted when rain washed out some primitive paintings, and closed some roads, delaying the convoying of portable toilets, which caused tensions among the crew. In Cumberland Caverns, the props were convoyed to a room located a quarter mile inside, where they were assembled.

A team led by Bill Munns was in charge of the Lemurian prosthetics. They took three hours to apply. Actor Jackson Bostwick suffered eye sores when he appeared partially in character at a press conference, wearing special "Lemurian" contact lenses, and it was thereafter decided that they should only be worn two hours at a time. Extras playing the creatures were paid $35 per day. To lighten the mood, Timothy Bottoms joined them under make-up in some scenes. However, Sharp felt that he had not been given what he had been promised in terms of effects.

=== Incidents ===
According to a publicist, filming in Alabama was disrupted by unknown forces, who were suspected to be either angry neighbors or disgruntled union members. An impersonator invited local press to the set at inopportune times. Air conditioning and generators were also tampered with. On the penultimate day inside the Cathedral Caverns, a few people fell sick. On the planned final day, Saturday 20 August, a more serious incident occurred when 17 people, including Sharp, were hospitalized due to carbon monoxide poisoning. According to Bottoms, it was determined that a downdraft had blown an electric generator's fumes back into the caves. A production executive blamed excessive heat outside. Extras present on set have alleged that fans had been turned off for reasons of convenience, compounding the problem. Blount recalled the accident happening while her character was tied up inside the cavern. "All the extras, as the Lemurians, were out in front of me, and I watched all these people just start silently falling over, fainting, as this wave of carbon monoxide came at them," she said. "We had very sick people, and it was a matter of determining who got in the first car out — youngest ones first." Filming at that location instead wrapped up the following Monday, after extra fans were brought in to purify the air.

=== Post-production ===
At the end of photography, Sharp told the producers that he did not think the footage looked good, nor did he think that much could be done about it. They agreed, and it was decided to pay him the remainder of his fee and send him home without taking part in post production. Robert D. Bailey assessed: "Frankly, I underestimated the difficulty of shooting in the caverns. If I had it to do over again, I would not attempt to do such extensive filming underground."

== Release ==
The film had not been pre-sold in the U.S. when it was shot. Although a publicist said that the film had attracted interest from Paramount and Universal, a crew member revealed that there was uncertainty as to whether it would even premiere on the big screen.

=== Theatrical ===
The film opened as What Waits Below in Kentucky on 16 November 1984, through Spartan/Republic Entertainment International, in what was billed as its world premiere. The inaugural screening was accompanied by an appearance from "Captain Marvel" (likely actor Jackson Bostwick, who had portrayed the character on television). The film expanded to a few other markets in the South and Midwest throughout spring and summer 1985, but did not get a true wide release in the U.S. The poster shown on this page's infobox seems to suggest that the film was shown in some British theaters, but no further information could be found at this time.

=== Home media ===
The film was released on U.S. VHS in the second week of November 1985, by Vestron subsidiary Lightning Video, also as What Waits Below. In the U.K., the film was released by Rank Video on 27 May 1985, as Secrets of the Phantom Caverns.

== Reception ==
What Waits Below has been poorly received. Writing in U.S. trade magazine Variety, the reviewer credited as Lor. called the film "a dull rendering of a lost race fantasy yarn," in which "an impressive cast is wasted." He did acknowledge "okay mattework and miniatures." William Whitaker of the Abilene Reporter-News deemed that "the quality of the filming is so below-par that the novelty of filming deep down the earth's interior could have been dispensed with," while "none of [the leads] come off too well." The BBC's RadioTimes was just as negative, dismissing it as a subpar effort from director Sharp and "a lost-world fantasy, which should never have been found." The acting was panned, particularly Powell's, whose presence was deemed "so negligible as to be negative."

== Notes ==
- Farmer, Donald (April 1984). "Secrets of the Phantom Caverns". Fangoria. No. 35. New York. pp. 25–28.
