= Judge Ellison =

Judge Ellison may refer to:

- James O. Ellison (1929–2014), judge of the United States District Court for the Northern District of Oklahoma
- Keith P. Ellison (born 1950), judge of the United States District Court for the Southern District of Texas
