= Gregory Kent Frizzell =

American judge (born 1956)

Senior Judge of the United States District Court for the Northern District of Oklahoma
- Incumbent
- Assumed office March 1, 2025

Chief Judge of the United States District Court for the Northern District of Oklahoma
- In office March 14, 2012 – March 14, 2019
- Preceded by: Claire Eagan
- Succeeded by: John E. Dowdell

Judge of the United States District Court for the Northern District of Oklahoma
- In office February 2, 2007 – March 1, 2025
- Appointed by: George W. Bush
- Preceded by: Sven Erik Holmes
- Succeeded by: vacant

Personal details
- Born: December 1956 (age 69) Wichita, Kansas, U.S.
- Parent: Kent Frizzell
- Education: University of Tulsa (BA); University of Michigan (JD)

Gregory Kent Frizzell (born 1956) is a senior United States district judge of the United States District Court for the Northern District of Oklahoma.

== Education and career ==
Frizzell was born in Wichita, Kansas. He received a Bachelor of Arts degree from the University of Tulsa in 1981 and a Juris Doctor from the University of Michigan Law School in 1984. He was a law clerk for Judge Thomas Rutherford Brett of the United States District Court for the Northern District of Oklahoma from 1984 to 1986, thereafter entering private practice in Tulsa, Oklahoma from 1986 to 1995, and then serving as general counsel to the Oklahoma Tax Commission from 1995 to 1997. From 1997 to 2007, he served as a judge of Oklahoma's 14th Judicial District.

=== Federal judicial service ===
On January 9, 2007, Frizzell was nominated by President George W. Bush to a seat on the United States District Court for the Northern District of Oklahoma vacated by Sven Erik Holmes. Frizzell was confirmed by the United States Senate on February 1, 2007, and received his commission on February 2, 2007. He was elevated to chief judge on March 14, 2012, succeeding Judge Claire Eagan, who had been appointed to the Foreign Intelligence Surveillance Court. His term as chief judge concluded on March 14, 2019. Frizzell assumed senior status on March 1, 2025.

== Sources ==
Legal offices
| Preceded by Sven Erik Holmes | Judge of the United States District Court for the Northern District of Oklahoma; 2007–2025 | Vacant |
| Preceded by Claire Eagan | Chief Judge of the United States District Court for the Northern District of Oklahoma; 2012–2019 | Succeeded by John E. Dowdell |
