= Kennamer Cove, Alabama =

Unincorporated community in Alabama, United States

- Unincorporated community
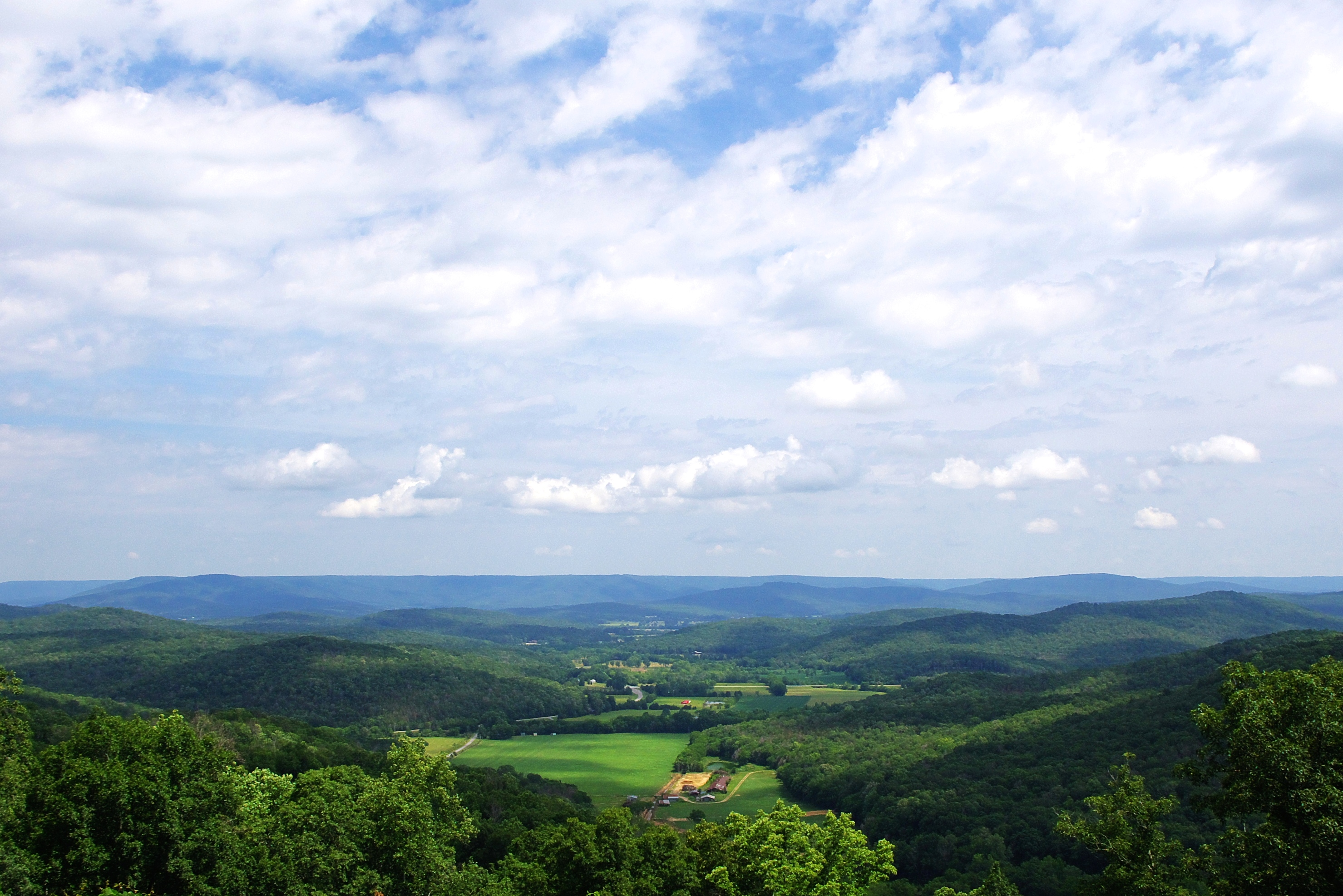
- Kennamer Cove, viewed from Gunters Mountain

- Location within Alabama Location within the United States
- Coordinates: 34°35′53″N 86°14′43″W
- Country: United States
- State: Alabama
- County: Marshall
- Elevation: 600 ft (180 m)
- Time zone: UTC-6 (Central (CST))
  - Summer (DST): UTC-5 (CDT)
- Area codes: 256 & 938
- GNIS feature ID: 121143

Kennamer Cove is an unincorporated community and cove in Marshall County, Alabama, United States. Kennamer Cove is located on the side of Gunters Mountain, and was first settled circa 1814 by the Kennamer family. Many of the inhabitants of the cove joined the Union Army during the American Civil War. Kennamer Cove is known regionally for hosting one of the largest family reunions in Alabama. Cathedral Caverns State Park and Kennamer Cave, a cave owned and preserved by the Southeastern Cave Conservancy Inc., are both located in Kennamer Cove.

A post office was operated in Kennamer Cove from 1870 to 1909.

== Notable people ==
- Charles Brents Kennamer, United States federal judge on the United States District Court for the Northern District of Alabama and the United States District Court for the Middle District of Alabama from 1931 to 1936
- Franklin Elmore Kennamer, United States federal judge on the United States District Court for the Northern District of Oklahoma, serving from 1925 to 1960
- Frank O. Slater, Seaman 2nd Class of the United States Navy, killed in action aboard USS San Francisco (CA-38) off Savo Island during World War II, and subsequently awarded the Navy Cross
