= Claire Eagan =

American judge (born 1950)

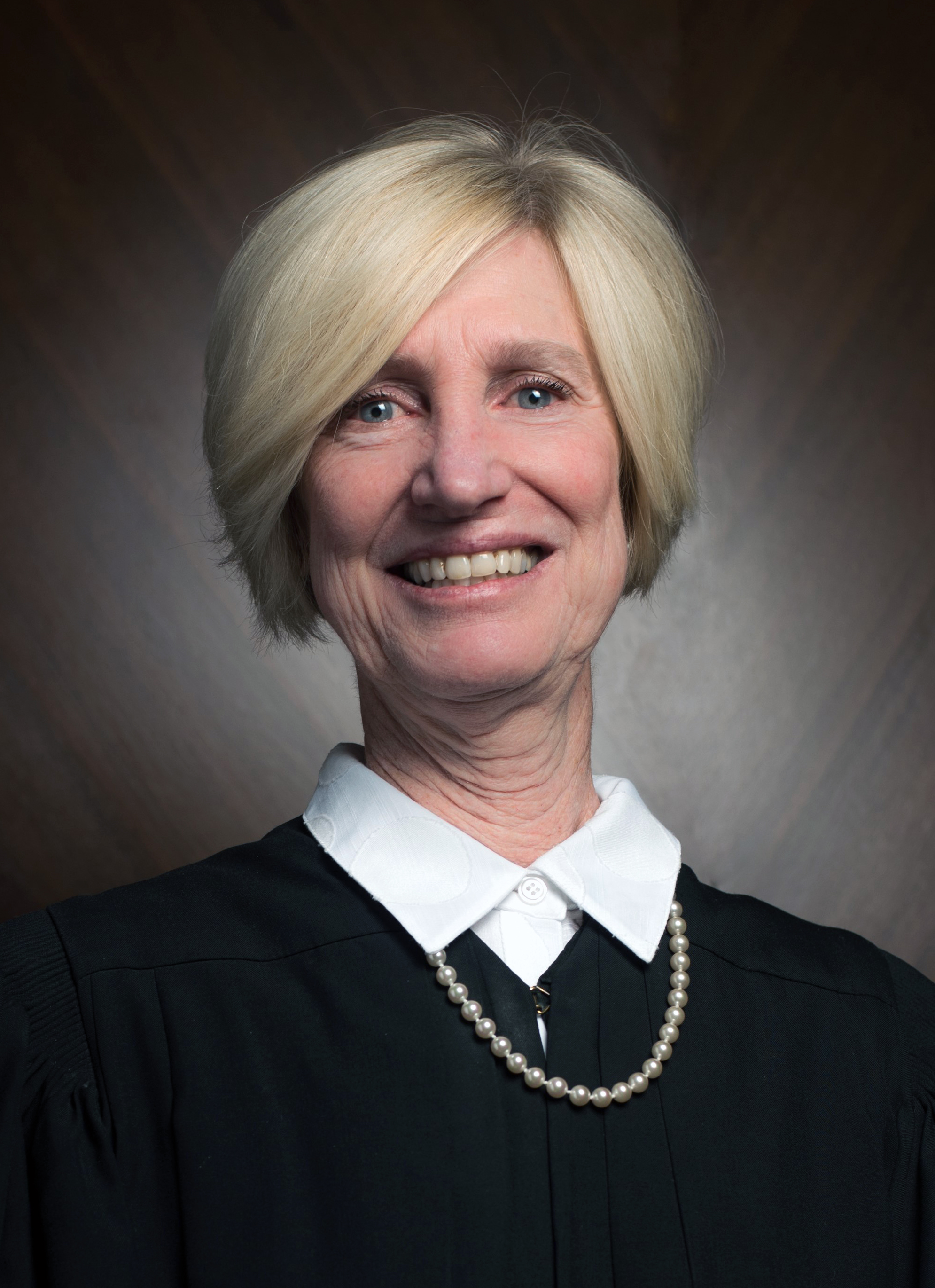

Judge of the United States Foreign Intelligence Surveillance Court
- In office February 13, 2013 – May 18, 2019
- Appointed by: John Roberts
- Preceded by: Frederick A. Daugherty
- Succeeded by: George Z. Singal

Senior Judge of the United States District Court for the Northern District of Oklahoma
- Incumbent
- Assumed office October 1, 2022

Chief Judge of the United States District Court for the Northern District of Oklahoma
- In office 2005–2012
- Preceded by: Sven Erik Holmes
- Succeeded by: Gregory Kent Frizzell

Judge of the United States District Court for the Northern District of Oklahoma
- In office October 4, 2001 – October 1, 2022
- Appointed by: George W. Bush
- Preceded by: Thomas Rutherford Brett
- Succeeded by: Sara E. Hill

Magistrate Judge of the United States District Court for the Northern District of Oklahoma
- In office 1998–2001

Personal details
- Born: October 9, 1950 (age 75) The Bronx, New York
- Education: Trinity Washington University (BA); Fordham University (JD)

Claire Veronica Eagan (born October 9, 1950) is a senior United States district judge of the United States District Court for the Northern District of Oklahoma and a former Judge of the United States Foreign Intelligence Surveillance Court. Effective February 12, 2020, Chief Justice John G. Roberts appointed Judge Eagan as the chair of the Executive Committee of the Judicial Conference.

== Early life and education ==
Born in The Bronx, New York, (Note: Her middle initial stands for Veronica, which was not given to her at birth, but which she added later as a young woman when she took the sacrament of communion at her Confirmation.) Eagan graduated from Trinity Washington University with a Bachelor of Arts degree in 1972, and later from Fordham University School of Law with a Juris Doctor in 1976. At Fordham, Eagan was a commentary editor of the Fordham Law Review.

== Career ==
Eagan began her legal career working as a law clerk to Judge Allen E. Barrow of the United States District Court for the Northern District of Oklahoma from 1976 to 1978. (Note: Eagan said later, "I moved here with the intention of staying one year, but I've stayed almost 26 years. Once I got here, I loved it.") She went into private practice attorney at the Hall Estill law firm in Tulsa, Oklahoma from 1978 to 1998. (Note: Eagan met Judge Fred Nelson, formerly chief judge on the Tulsa County District Court, but by 1978 was the head of litigation at Hall Estill. Nelson interviewed her for the job, became her supervisor and acted as her mentor until he died in July, 1987. Eagan told an interviewer in 2002, that Nelson was her ethical role model, and that he told her, "... you can't change the facts. All you can do is argue the facts and the law, and fight for the your client the best way you can.") She wrote an affidavit in support of April Rose Wilkens, whom she knew during her time as an attorney.

== Federal judicial service ==
Eagan served as a United States magistrate judge for the Northern District of Oklahoma from 1998 until 2001. On the recommendation of Senators James Inhofe and Don Nickles, Eagan was nominated to the United States District Court for the Northern District of Oklahoma by President George W. Bush on September 4, 2001, to a seat vacated by Thomas Rutherford Brett. Eagan was confirmed by the Senate on October 23, 2001, on a Senate vote and received her commission the next day. Eagan served as the chief judge of the court from 2005 to 2012. Eagen assumed senior status on October 1, 2022. She worked with Larry Morris of the Oklahoma Pardon and Parole Board in 2011, before he was appointed to the board, to support at-risk youth.

=== Assignment to FISC ===
In February 2013, she was appointed to the Foreign Intelligence Surveillance Court (FISC), established in 1978 per the Foreign Intelligence Surveillance Act. Her term expired May 18, 2019.

She was the author of the August 29, 2013, FISC opinion released on September 17, 2013, explaining that the call metadata collection program was constitutional, and thus "any decision about whether to keep it was a political question, not a legal one". The first FISC opinion written since the Snowden leaks (judges must reauthorize the program every 90 days and generally they are "brief reiterations of the court’s legal analysis"), the lengthy 29-page opinion is thought to have been written "for the purpose of public release". Eagan wrote "metadata that includes phone numbers, time and duration of calls is not protected by the Fourth Amendment, since the content of the calls is not accessed". In the opinion, Eagan said "data collection is authorized under Section 215 of the Patriot Act that allows the FBI to issue orders to produce tangible things if there are reasonable grounds to believe the records are relevant to a terrorism investigation." The opinion authorized the FBI to "collect the information for probes of 'unknown' as well as known terrorists". She also noted that no U.S. telecommunications company had legally refused to turn over customer metadata, "despite the mechanism for doing so".

=== Executive Committee of the Judicial Conference ===
Effective February 12, 2020, Chief Justice John G. Roberts appointed Judge Eagan as the chair of the Executive Committee of the Judicial Conference. The press notice, released by the U.S. District Court for the Northern District of Oklahoma, noted that Eagan had served on that committee since December, 2008, when she had been appointed to succeed Judge Merrick B. Garland on the U.S. Court of Appeals for the D.C. Circuit. (Note: Part of the notice is incorrect, because Garland's nomination to the U. S. Supreme Court failed when the U.S. Senate refused to consider any nomination to that court by President Obama during 2012, his last year in office. Hence, Garland remained on the D.C. Circuit Court.)

== See also ==
- List of first women lawyers and judges in Oklahoma

Legal offices
Preceded by Thomas Rutherford Brett	Judge of the United States District Court for the Northern District of Oklahoma; 2001–2022	Succeeded by Sara E. Hill
Preceded by Frederick A. Daugherty	Judge of the United States Foreign Intelligence Surveillance Court; 2013–2019	Succeeded by George Z. Singal
