= John D. Russell (judge) =

American judge (born 1963)

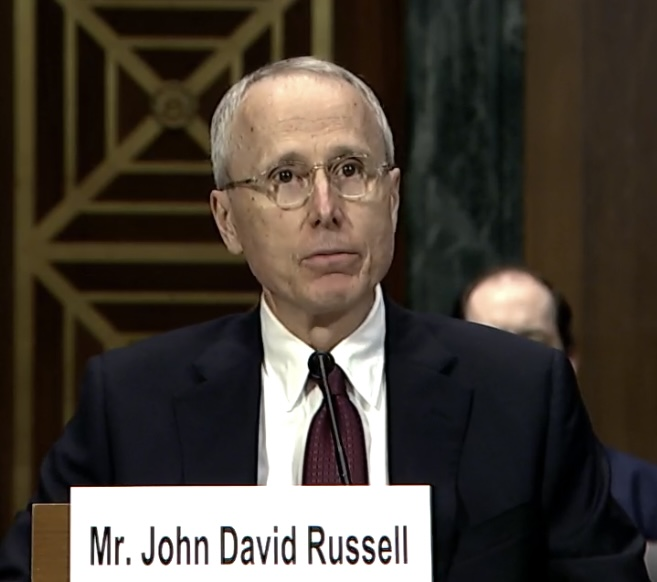

Judge of the United States District Court for the Northern District of Oklahoma
- Incumbent
- Assumed office January 4, 2024
- Appointed by: Joe Biden
- Preceded by: John E. Dowdell

Personal details
- Born: John David Russell; 1963 (age 62–63) Enid, Oklahoma, U.S.
- Education: Oklahoma State University (BS); University of Oklahoma (JD)

John David Russell (born 1963) is an American lawyer from Oklahoma who is serving as a United States district judge of the United States District Court for the Northern District of Oklahoma.

== Early life and education ==
Russell was born and raised in Enid, Oklahoma. He received a Bachelor of Science in political science from Oklahoma State University in 1985 and a Juris Doctor from the University of Oklahoma College of Law in 1988.

== Career ==
From 1988 to 1991, Russell was an associate at Bracewell & Patterson in Washington, D.C., where he specialized in antitrust and regulatory law. From 1991 to 1993, he was a trial attorney in the Tax Division of the U.S. Department of Justice. From 1995 to 2002, he served as an assistant U.S. attorney in the U.S. Attorney's Office for the Northern District of Oklahoma, where he focused on bankruptcy law, wire fraud, money laundering, and tax evasion. From 2002 to 2014, he was in private practice at Fellers Snider Blankenship Bailey & Tippens, in their Tulsa office. From 2015 to 2023, he was a shareholder at the law firm GableGotwals in Tulsa. In private practice, Russell has represented companies sued by the government as well as companies and individuals under investigation by grand juries or governmental agencies.

=== Federal judicial service ===
On October 18, 2023, President Joe Biden announced his intent to nominate Russell to serve as a United States district judge of the United States District Court for the Northern District of Oklahoma. His nomination was part of a bipartisan package of nominees which included Sara E. Hill His nomination was endorsed by Senators James Lankford and Markwayne Mullin. On October 24, 2023, his nomination was sent to the Senate. President Biden nominated Russell to the seat vacated by Judge John E. Dowdell, who assumed senior status on June 21, 2021. On November 15, 2023, a hearing on his nomination was held before the Senate Judiciary Committee. On December 7, 2023, his nomination was reported out of committee by an 18–3 vote. On December 19, 2023, the United States Senate confirmed his nomination by a voice vote. He received his judicial commission on January 4, 2024. He was sworn in on January 6, 2024.

Legal offices
Preceded by John E. Dowdell	Judge of the United States District Court for the Northern District of Oklahoma; 2024–present	Incumbent
