= Ruth Bradley Holmes =

American linguist, educator, and polyglot (1924–2021)

- Born: Edith Frances Ruth Bradley; November 26, 1924; Beijing, China
- Died: September 2, 2021 (aged 96); Bartlesville, Oklahoma, U.S.
- Occupations: Linguist, educator, polyglot
- Spouse: Clifford Holmes (m. 1945)
- Children: Alexander Holmes, Cameron Holmes, Sven Holmes, Hugh Holmes, Kurt Holmes, Madeline Holmes, Alison Holmes.

Academic background
- Education: University of California, Berkeley

Edith Frances Ruth Bradley Holmes (November 26, 1924 – September 2, 2021) was an American linguist, educator, and polyglot who authored two Cherokee language textbooks. Holmes served on the Oklahoma State Regents for Higher Education from 1975 to 1985. She taught Russian language at Louisiana State University and Russian and Cherokee language adult education courses in Bartlesville, Oklahoma.

== Early life ==
Edith Frances Ruth Bradley was born on November 26, 1924, in Beijing to Edith Louise Grierson and Hugh Wise Bradley. She had a brother, Ian Henri Cairns Bradley. Her father was commissioner of the Chinese Maritime Customs Service. She was raised in China before moving to California in 1938. Holmes graduated from the Dominican Convent School. She earned a B.A. in Slavic languages from the University of California, Berkeley. Holmes, a polyglot, was fluent in English, Russian, Portuguese, and French and proficient in German, Greek, Latin, and Spanish.

== Career ==
Holmes was a Russian translator at the United Nations Conference on International Organization. She taught Russian at Louisiana State University (LSU), TRW Reda Pump, and Phillips Petroleum Company. In 1947, Holmes studied English language at LSU. In the late 1960s, she became interested in the indigenous languages of the Americas, especially Cherokee. In 1971, she took an economic geography of Russia course at the Middlebury College Language Schools. In the summer of 1976, Holmes studied 17th-century philosophy at the University of Oxford. She was a Cherokee and Russian teacher of adult education courses in Bartlesville, Oklahoma. Betty Sharp Smith, a Cherokee, assisted her in lesson planning for a Cherokee language adult education course she taught. The pair published their materials as a textbook.

== Personal life ==
During World War II, Holmes met her husband Clifford Holmes while he was a patient at the hospital in Santa Cruz, California, where she and her mother were volunteering. They married in Santa Cruz in 1945. They moved frequently for his job. In 1959, they moved from Salt Lake City to Bartlesville, Oklahoma. She had seven children. Holmes was a member of the American Association of University Women and the Kappa Alpha Theta Alumnus Club. She was president of the Washington County Democratic Women's Club and campaign manager of Washington County for Governor, David Boren. Boren appointed Holmes on the Oklahoma State Regents for Higher Education from 1976 to 1985. She chaired the board from 1981 to 1982.

Holmes died on September 2, 2021, in Bartlesville, Oklahoma.

== Selected works ==
- Holmes, Ruth Bradley; Smith, Betty Sharp (1977). Beginning Cherokee. University of Oklahoma Press. ISBN 978-0-8061-1463-7.
- Holmes, Ruth Bradley (2004). Four Gospels and selected Psalms in Cherokee. University of Oklahoma Press. ISBN 978-0-8061-3628-8.
