= Royce H. Savage =

American judge

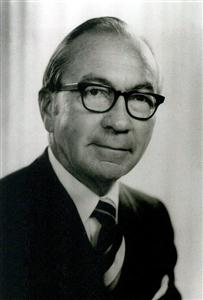

Chief Judge of the United States District Court for the Northern District of Oklahoma
- In office 1949–1961
- Preceded by: Office established
- Succeeded by: Allen E. Barrow

Judge of the United States District Court for the Northern District of Oklahoma
- In office October 1, 1940 – October 31, 1961
- Appointed by: Franklin D. Roosevelt
- Preceded by: Franklin Elmore Kennamer
- Succeeded by: Allen E. Barrow

Personal details
- Born: Royce H. Savage; March 31, 1904 Blanco, Indian Territory
- Died: December 27, 1993 (aged 89) Tulsa, Oklahoma
- Education: University of Oklahoma (A.B.); University of Oklahoma College of Law (LL.B.)

Royce H. Savage (March 31, 1904 – December 27, 1993) was a United States district judge of the United States District Court for the Northern District of Oklahoma.

== Education and career ==
Born in Blanco, Indian Territory (now Oklahoma), Savage received an Artium Baccalaureus degree from the University of Oklahoma in 1925, and a Bachelor of Laws from the University of Oklahoma College of Law in 1927. He was in private practice in Tulsa, Oklahoma from 1929 to 1938 and in Oklahoma City, Oklahoma from 1938 to 1940.

== Federal judicial service ==
Savage was nominated by President Franklin D. Roosevelt on September 24, 1940, to a seat on the United States District Court for the Northern District of Oklahoma vacated by Judge Franklin Elmore Kennamer. He was confirmed by the United States Senate on September 27, 1940, and received his commission on October 1, 1940. He served as Chief Judge from 1949 to 1961. His service terminated on October 31, 1961, due to his resignation.

== Post judicial service and death ==
After his resignation from the federal bench, Savage was General Counsel for Gulf Oil Corporation from 1961 to 1969, and returned afterward to private practice in Tulsa. He died on December 27, 1993, in Tulsa.

== Sources ==
- Royce H. Savage's obituary

Legal offices
| Preceded by Franklin Elmore Kennamer | Judge of the United States District Court for the Northern District of Oklahoma; 1940–1961 | Succeeded by Allen E. Barrow |
| Preceded by Office established | Chief Judge of the United States District Court for the Northern District of Oklahoma; 1949–1961 | Succeeded by Allen E. Barrow |
