= William Robert Wallace Jr. =

American judge and politician (1918–1975)

Oklahoma County District Judge
- In office September 18, 1956 – 1965
- Appointed by: Raymond Gary
- Preceded by: W. A. Carlile
- Succeeded by: Jack R. Parr

Member of the Oklahoma House of Representatives from the Oklahoma County district
- In office November 1948 – November 1952
- Preceded by: Paul Washington
- Succeeded by: G. M. Fuller

Personal details
- Born: March 15, 1918 Pauls Valley, Oklahoma, U.S.
- Died: January 16, 1975 (aged 56) Acapulco, Mexico
- Parent: William Robert Wallace (father)
- Education: Oklahoma Baptist University; Baylor University; University of Oklahoma College of Law

William Robert Wallace Jr. was an American politician who served in the Oklahoma House of Representatives representing Oklahoma County from 1948 to 1952.

== Biography ==
William Robert Wallace Jr. was born in Pauls Valley, Oklahoma, the son of William Robert Wallace. He attended Oklahoma Baptist University, graduated from Baylor University, and graduated from the University of Oklahoma College of Law in 1941. He worked for the FBI from 1942 to 1946 before returning to Oklahoma City.

Wallace served in the Oklahoma House of Representatives as a member of the Democratic Party representing Oklahoma County from 1948 to 1952. He was preceded in office by Paul Washington and succeeded in office by G. M. Fuller. He served in the United States Army from March 1951 to May 1952 during the Korean War. He was appointed as a district judge by Governor Raymond Gary on September 18, 1956, and served in office until his resignation in 1965. He worked as an adjunct professor for Oklahoma City University from 1959 to 1965. He died on January 16, 1975, in Acapulco, Mexico of a heart attack while on vacation.
