= Bower Slack Broaddus =

American judge

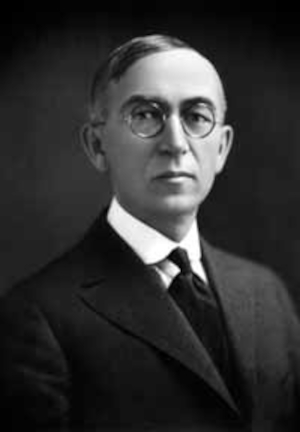

Judge of the United States District Court for the Eastern District of Oklahoma Judge of the United States District Court for the Northern District of Oklahoma Judge of the United States District Court for the Western District of Oklahoma
- In office October 1, 1940 – December 10, 1949
- Appointed by: Franklin D. Roosevelt
- Preceded by: Alfred P. Murrah
- Succeeded by: William Robert Wallace

Member of the Oklahoma Senate
- In office 1935–1938

Member of the Oklahoma House of Representatives
- In office 1933–1934

Personal details
- Born: Bower Slack Broaddus; May 30, 1888 Chillicothe, Missouri, U.S.
- Died: December 10, 1949 (aged 61)
- Education: Kansas City School of Law (LL.B.)

Bower Slack Broaddus (May 30, 1888 – December 10, 1949) was a United States district judge of the United States District Court for the Eastern District of Oklahoma, the United States District Court for the Northern District of Oklahoma and the United States District Court for the Western District of Oklahoma.

== Education and career ==
Born in Chillicothe, Missouri, Broaddus received a Bachelor of Laws from the Kansas City School of Law (now the University of Missouri–Kansas City School of Law) in 1910. He was in private practice in Muskogee, Oklahoma from 1910 to 1940. He was a police judge in Muskogee from 1912 to 1914, and was a city attorney of Muskogee from 1926 to 1930. He was a member of the Oklahoma House of Representatives from 1933 to 1935, and of the Oklahoma Senate from 1935 to 1938.

== Federal judicial service ==
Broaddus was nominated by President Franklin D. Roosevelt on September 24, 1940, to a joint seat on the United States District Court for the Eastern District of Oklahoma, the United States District Court for the Northern District of Oklahoma and the United States District Court for the Western District of Oklahoma vacated by Judge Alfred P. Murrah. He was confirmed by the United States Senate on September 27, 1940, and received his commission on October 1, 1940. In 1948 Broaddus was assigned to a three-judge panel that ruled on the case McLaurin v. Oklahoma State Regents (87 F. Supp. 526; 1948 U.S. Dist.) whether segregation was permitted in high education in Oklahoma. His service terminated on December 10, 1949, due to his death.

== Sources ==
Legal offices
Preceded by Alfred P. Murrah	Judge of the United States District Court for the Eastern District of Oklahoma; Judge of the United States District Court for the Northern District of Oklahoma; Judge of the United States District Court for the Western District of Oklahoma; 1940–1949	Succeeded by William Robert Wallace
