= Blanco, Oklahoma =

- Unincorporated community
- Location within Oklahoma Location within the United States
- Coordinates: 34°45′02″N 95°46′24″W
- Country: United States
- State: Oklahoma
- County: Pittsburg

Area
  - Total: 0.66 sq mi (1.71 km^{2})
  - Land: 0.66 sq mi (1.70 km^{2})
  - Water: 0.0039 sq mi (0.01 km^{2})
- Elevation: 702 ft (214 m)

Population (2020)
  - Total: 105
  - Density: 160.1/sq mi (61.83/km^{2})
- Time zone: UTC-6 (Central (CST))
  - Summer (DST): UTC-5 (CDT)
- Zip code: 74528
- Area codes: 539/918
- GNIS feature ID: 2629908

Blanco is a rural unincorporated community located on State Highway 63 in Pittsburg County, Oklahoma, United States. The ZIP code is 74528. The Census Bureau defined a census-designated place (CDP) for Blanco in 2015. As of the 2020 census, Blanco had a population of 105.

== History ==
A post office was established at Blanco, Indian Territory on August 31, 1901. Blanco was named for Ramón Blanco y Erenas, one-time governor general of Cuba. The post office opened August 31, 1901.

At the time of its founding, the community was located in the Moshulatubbee District of the Choctaw Nation. It was located in either Atoka County or Tobucksy County. The settlement was in the area of the county boundary, and differing maps of the era show it in each.

== Demographics ==
Historical population
| Census | Pop. | Note | %± |
|---|---|---|---|
| 2020 | 105 | | — |
U.S. Decennial Census

=== 2020 census ===
As of the 2020 census, Blanco had a population of 105. The median age was 38.8 years. 31.4% of residents were under the age of 18 and 18.1% of residents were 65 years of age or older. For every 100 females there were 123.4 males, and for every 100 females age 18 and over there were 118.2 males age 18 and over.

0.0% of residents lived in urban areas, while 100.0% lived in rural areas.

There were 41 households in Blanco, of which 24.4% had children under the age of 18 living in them. Of all households, 29.3% were married-couple households, 34.1% were households with a male householder and no spouse or partner present, and 34.1% were households with a female householder and no spouse or partner present. About 34.2% of all households were made up of individuals and 19.5% had someone living alone who was 65 years of age or older.

There were 48 housing units, of which 14.6% were vacant. The homeowner vacancy rate was 0.0% and the rental vacancy rate was 11.5%.

Racial composition as of the 2020 census
| Race | Number | Percent |
|---|---|---|
| White | 53 | 50.5% |
| Black or African American | 0 | 0.0% |
| American Indian and Alaska Native | 16 | 15.2% |
| Asian | 0 | 0.0% |
| Native Hawaiian and Other Pacific Islander | 0 | 0.0% |
| Some other race | 1 | 1.0% |
| Two or more races | 35 | 33.3% |
| Hispanic or Latino (of any race) | 2 | 1.9% |

== Notable people ==
- Pryor McBee, Major League Baseball pitcher, was born in Blanco in 1901.
- Royce H. Savage, United States Federal Court judge, was born in Blanco in 1904.
- Gene Stipe, the longest-serving member of the Oklahoma Senate, was born in Blanco in 1926.
