= William Robert Wallace =

American judge

Judge of the United States District Court for the Eastern District of Oklahoma Judge of the United States District Court for the Northern District of Oklahoma Judge of the United States District Court for the Western District of Oklahoma
- In office June 8, 1950 – June 24, 1960
- Appointed by: Harry S. Truman
- Preceded by: Bower Slack Broaddus
- Succeeded by: Luther L. Bohanon

Member of the Oklahoma Senate from the 19th district
- In office November 1918 – November 1922 Serving with W. H. Woods
- Preceded by: Joe A. Edwards
- Succeeded by: John E. Luttrell

Member of the Oklahoma House of Representatives from the Garvin County district
- In office November 1908 – November 1910
- Preceded by: William Tabor
- Succeeded by: William Tabor

Personal details
- Born: William Robert Wallace; February 21, 1886 Troy, Texas, U.S.
- Died: June 24, 1960 (aged 74)
- Children: William Robert Wallace Jr.
- Education: University of Oklahoma College of Law

William Robert Wallace (February 21, 1886 – June 24, 1960) was a United States district judge of the United States District Court for the Eastern District of Oklahoma, the United States District Court for the Northern District of Oklahoma and the United States District Court for the Western District of Oklahoma.

== Education and career ==
Born in Troy, Texas, on February 21, 1886, to William Thomas Wallace and Sarah Elizabeth Crekmore. He attended public schools in Sweetwater, Texas, and moved to Wynne Wood, Indian Territory in 1896. He attended Indianola College and Capitol Hill Business College in Guthrie, Oklahoma. In 1907, he was appointed deputy clerk for Garvin County.

Wallace served in the Oklahoma House of Representatives from 1908 to 1910 representing Garvin County as a member of the Democratic Party. He was preceded and succeeded in office by William Tabor. He later served in the Oklahoma Senate from 1918 to 1922. He was preceded in office by Joe A. Edwards and succeeded in office by John E. Luttrell.

Wallace also attended the University of Oklahoma College of Law and read law to enter the bar in 1910. He was in private practice in Pauls Valley, Oklahoma from 1910 to 1925, and then in Oklahoma City, Oklahoma until 1950. He also was the city attorney of Pauls Valley from 1911 to 1912, and a county judge of Garvin County, Oklahoma from 1913 to 1917. He was Chairman of the Oklahoma Public Welfare Commission from 1939 to 1942.

== Federal judicial service ==
Wallace was nominated by President Harry S. Truman on April 17, 1950, to a joint seat on the United States District Court for the Eastern District of Oklahoma, United States District Court for the Northern District of Oklahoma and the United States District Court for the Western District of Oklahoma vacated by Judge Bower Slack Broaddus. He was confirmed by the United States Senate on June 2, 1950, and received his commission on June 8, 1950. His service terminated on June 24, 1960, due to his death.

== Sources ==
Legal offices
Preceded by Bower Slack Broaddus	Judge of the United States District Court for the Eastern District of Oklahoma; Judge of the United States District Court for the Northern District of Oklahoma; Judge of the United States District Court for the Western District of Oklahoma; 1950–1960	Succeeded by Luther L. Bohanon
