= Grant, Alabama =

- Town
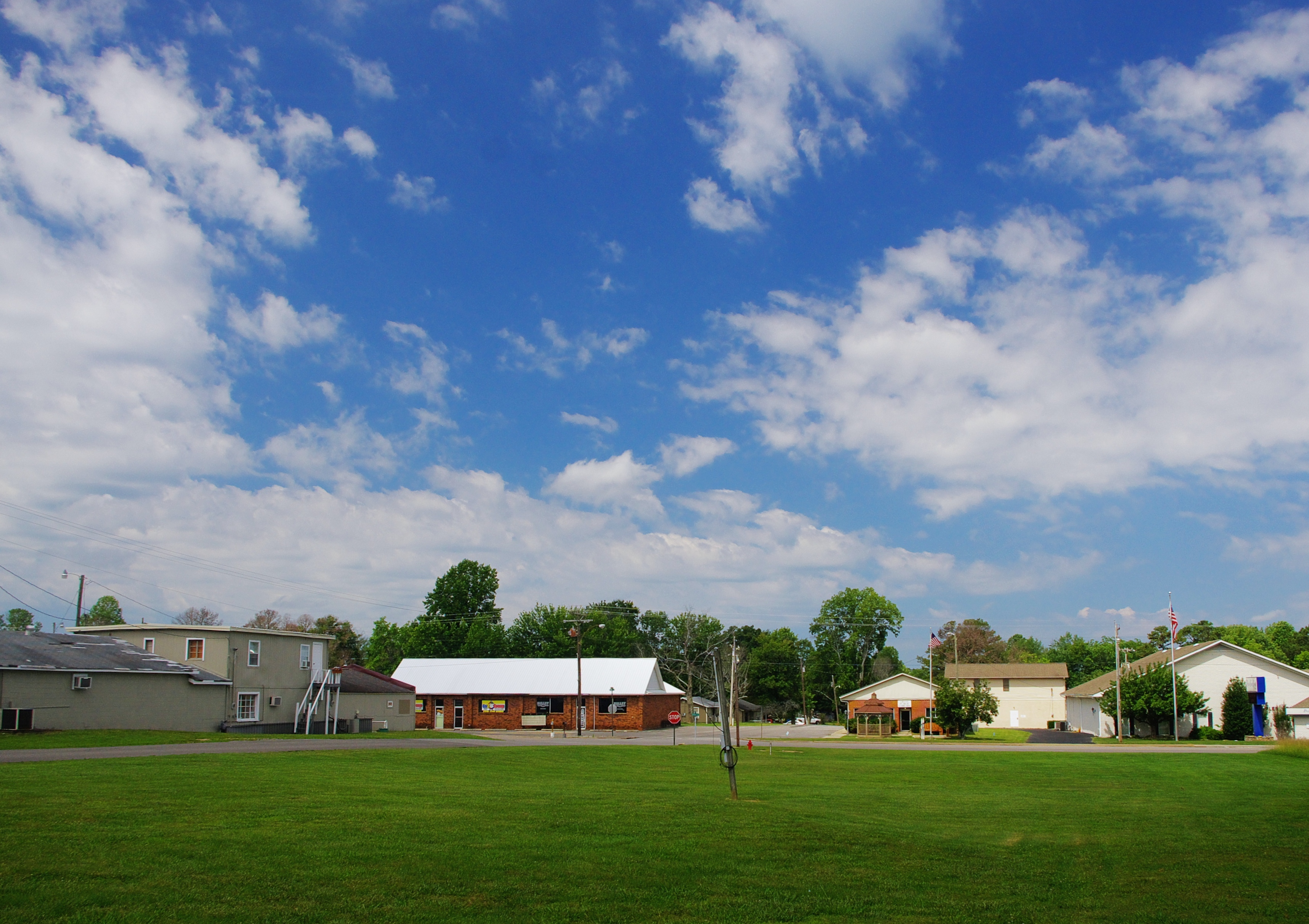
- Buildings on Main Street

- Seal
- Nickname: "Home of the DAR Patriots"
- Motto: "...a scenic mountain town"
- Location in Marshall County, Alabama
- Coordinates: 34°30′09″N 86°15′31″W
- Country: United States
- State: Alabama
- County: Marshall

Area
  - Total: 1.86 sq mi (4.81 km^{2})
  - Land: 1.85 sq mi (4.80 km^{2})
  - Water: 0.0039 sq mi (0.01 km^{2})
- Elevation: 1,250 ft (380 m)

Population (2020)
  - Total: 1,039
  - Density: 561.2/sq mi (216.68/km^{2})
- Time zone: UTC-6 (Central (CST))
  - Summer (DST): UTC-5 (CDT)
- ZIP code: 35747
- Area code: 256
- FIPS code: 01-31096
- GNIS feature ID: 2406603
- Website: www.grantal.org

Grant is a town in Marshall County, Alabama, United States. As of the 2020 census, the population of Grant was 1,039, up from 896 at the 2010 census. It is included in the Huntsville-Decatur Combined Statistical Area.

== History ==
Grant was settled in the late 1830s, and a post office was established in 1887. The town was named in honor of General Ulysses S. Grant, as many residents in the area had supported the Union during the American Civil War.

In 1924, the Daughters of the American Revolution (DAR) established the Kate Duncan Smith DAR School in Grant as part of a program to build schools in areas that lacked access to public education. The school, now listed on the National Register of Historic Places, still serves K-12 students, and remains the only K-12 school owned and operated by the DAR.

The town was incorporated on November 15, 1945, with Delbert Hodges serving as the first mayor.

== Geography ==
Grant is located in northeastern Marshall County at an approximate elevation of 1,310 feet (400 m) on the plateau of Gunters Mountain. The town is concentrated along County Road 5 (Cathedral Caverns Highway, signed as Main Street in Grant) near the northern edge of Gunters Mountain, though the town includes corridors along CR 5 southward across the mountain to the shore of Guntersville Lake, and eastward along Baker Mountain Road to the edge of the mountain. Grant is 13 miles (21 km) north of Guntersville, 18 miles (29 km) southwest of Scottsboro, and 30 miles (48 km) southeast of Huntsville.

According to the U.S. Census Bureau, the town of Grant has a total area of 1.9 square miles (4.9 km^{2}), of which 2.71 acres (10,961 m^{2}), or 0.22%, are water. A historic cave, Cathedral Caverns, lies 5 miles (8 km) north of Grant near Kennamer Cove.

== Demographics ==
Historical population
Census	Pop.	Note	%±
1950	191		—
1960	274		43.5%
1970	382		39.4%
1980	632		65.4%
1990	638		0.9%
2000	665		4.2%
2010	896		34.7%
2020	1,039		16.0%
U.S. Decennial Census; 2013 Estimate

=== 2020 census ===
As of the 2020 census, Grant had a population of 1,039. There were 386 households and 286 families residing in the town. The median age was 35.5 years. 28.0% of residents were under the age of 18 and 11.9% of residents were 65 years of age or older. For every 100 females there were 95.3 males, and for every 100 females age 18 and over there were 92.8 males age 18 and over.

0.0% of residents lived in urban areas, while 100.0% lived in rural areas.

Of the 386 households, 42.5% had children under the age of 18 living in them. Married-couple households accounted for 61.9%, 12.4% were households with a male householder and no spouse or partner present, and 20.2% were households with a female householder and no spouse or partner present. About 19.9% of all households were made up of individuals and 6.4% had someone living alone who was 65 years of age or older.

There were 417 housing units, of which 7.4% were vacant. The homeowner vacancy rate was 3.3% and the rental vacancy rate was 5.3%.

Racial composition as of the 2020 census
Race	Number	Percent
White	979	94.2%
Black or African American	4	0.4%
American Indian and Alaska Native	10	1.0%
Asian	2	0.2%
Native Hawaiian and Other Pacific Islander	0	0.0%
Some other race	5	0.5%
Two or more races	39	3.8%
Hispanic or Latino (of any race)	15	1.4%

=== 2000 census ===
As of the census of 2000, there were 665 people, 279 households, and 200 families residing in the town. The population density was 375.8 inhabitants per square mile (145.1/km^{2}). There were 306 housing units at an average density of 172.9 per square mile (66.8/km^{2}). The racial makeup of the town was 96.54% White, 0.60% Black or African American, 1.05% Native American, 0.15% Asian, 0.15% from other races, and 1.50% from two or more races. 0.30% of the population were Hispanic or Latino of any race.

There were 279 households, out of which 33.7% had children under the age of 18 living with them, 61.3% were married couples living together, 9.0% had a female householder with no husband present, and 28.0% were non-families. 27.2% of all households were made up of individuals, and 11.5% had someone living alone who was 65 years of age or older. The average household size was 2.38 and the average family size was 2.90. The Alabama median age was 39.

In the town the population was spread out, with 25.3% under the age of 18, 6.2% from 18 to 24, 29.0% from 25 to 44, 24.7% from 45 to 64, and 14.9% who were 65 years of age or older. The median age was 38 years. For every 100 females, there were 81.2 males. For every 100 females age 18 and over, there were 79.4 males.

The median income for a household in the town was $37,188, and the median income for a family was $45,417. Males had a median income of $35,795 versus $29,750 for females. The per capita income for the town was $20,014. About 6.0% of families and 8.4% of the population were below the poverty line, including 9.8% of those under age 18 and 11.5% of those age 65 or over.

== Notable people ==
- Vernon Derrick, fiddle and mandolin player for Hank Williams Jr's Bama Band in the 1980s
