= Luther L. Bohanon =

American judge

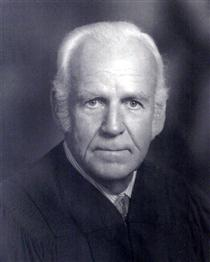

Senior Judge of the United States District Court for the Eastern District of Oklahoma Senior Judge of the United States District Court for the Northern District of Oklahoma Senior Judge of the United States District Court for the Western District of Oklahoma
- In office August 2, 1974 – July 18, 2003

Chief Judge of the United States District Court for the Western District of Oklahoma
- In office 1969–1972
- Preceded by: Stephen Sanders Chandler Jr.
- Succeeded by: Frederick Alvin Daugherty

Judge of the United States District Court for the Eastern District of Oklahoma Judge of the United States District Court for the Northern District of Oklahoma Judge of the United States District Court for the Western District of Oklahoma
- In office August 30, 1961 – August 2, 1974
- Appointed by: John F. Kennedy
- Preceded by: William Robert Wallace
- Succeeded by: H. Dale Cook

Personal details
- Born: Luther Lee Bohanon; August 9, 1902 Fort Smith, Arkansas, U.S.
- Died: July 18, 2003 (aged 100) Oklahoma City, Oklahoma, U.S.
- Resting place: Fairlawn Cemetery; Oklahoma City, Oklahoma
- Party: Democratic
- Spouse: Marie Swatek
- Education: University of Oklahoma College of Law (LL.B.)
- Profession: Law

Luther Lee Bohanon (August 9, 1902 – July 18, 2003) was a United States district judge of the United States District Court for the Eastern District of Oklahoma, the United States District Court for the Northern District of Oklahoma and the United States District Court for the Western District of Oklahoma.

== Education and career ==
Bohanon was born on August 9, 1902, in Fort Smith, Arkansas, to William and Artelia Hickman Bohanon. His family moved to Stigler, Oklahoma, four years later. Another move took the family of 14 children to Kinta, Oklahoma where he completed his elementary education. He completed his high school education at Muskogee, Oklahoma. Bohanon received a Bachelor of Laws in 1927 from the University of Oklahoma College of Law. He was an assistant county attorney for Seminole County, Oklahoma in Seminole, Oklahoma from 1927 to 1928. He entered private practice in Seminole and Oklahoma City, Oklahoma from 1928 to 1936, then solely in Oklahoma City from 1936 to 1961. Bohanon was partnered with Alfred P. Murrah during his entire law service at the law firm of Murrah & Bohanon, with their two most notable clients being Armand Hammer and Howard Hughes. Bohanon also worked with oilman Robert S. Kerr to elect Leon Phillips as governor. Their friendship continued thereafter. He also became a friend of Kerr's brother, Aubrey. In 1961, when Bohanan was being considered for another appointment, the ABA said that he was unqualified. Attorney General Robert F. Kennedy, who was not a friend of the Kerrs, had the nomination stalled in the U. S. Senate. Kerr, in turn, stalled certain legislation in the Senate that the Kennedy Administration considered critical. The stalemate was eventually broken and Bohanon received his appointment. He resigned his ABA membership and never rejoined.

Bohanon was the bankruptcy trustee for Selected Investments, where his work uncovered evidence of corruption at the Oklahoma Supreme Court. He also represented the Otoe-Missouria tribe in a case that allowed them to sue for the fair value of their aboriginal lands. (Note: This ruling set a precedent for other uncompensated Native American tribes to do the same.) He served in the United States Army Air Corps as a Major in the JAG Corps from 1942 to 1945.

== Federal judicial service ==
After a recommendation by future Oklahoma United States Senator Robert S. Kerr, Bohanon was nominated by President John F. Kennedy on August 18, 1961, to a joint seat on the United States District Court for the Eastern District of Oklahoma, the United States District Court for the Northern District of Oklahoma and the United States District Court for the Western District of Oklahoma vacated by Judge William Robert Wallace. He was confirmed by the United States Senate on August 30, 1961, and received his commission on August 30, 1961. He served as Chief Judge of the Western District from 1969 to 1972. He assumed senior status on August 2, 1974. His service terminated on July 18, 2003, due to his death.

=== Notable cases ===
Bohanon presided over two important civil rights cases: Battle v. Oklahoma which resulted in the State being ordered to implement procedures for the humane treatment of prison inmates; and Dowell v. Oklahoma City Board of Education, requiring the racial desegregation of the Oklahoma City schools.

== Personal ==
Bohanon was active in Democratic Party affairs on the local, state and national levels. He was a member of the Democratic Party's National Convention platform committee in 1940. He was a Mason and a Shriner and a member of the United Methodist Church of Nichols Hills, Oklahoma. He married Marie Swatek in July 1933. (Note: Marie's father had come to Oklahoma in 1899 and acquired a homestead in Oklahoma County during the Land Rush of 1889.) They had four children. One son, Richard L. Bohanon, became a United States bankruptcy judge in Oklahoma City. The other children died either in infancy or very early childhood. (Note: See Find a Grave) Both Bohanon's were buried in Fairlawn Cemetery in Oklahoma City.

== Other sources ==
- "Luther Bohanon", Vertical File, Research Division, Oklahoma Historical Society, Oklahoma City, Oklahoma.
- "Luther Bohanon", Vertical File, Oklahoma Room, Oklahoma Department of Libraries, Oklahoma City, Oklahoma.
- Daily Oklahoman (Oklahoma City), 18 April 1999 and 31 October 2001.
- Kenny A. Franks and Paul F. Lambert, The Legacy of Dean Julien C. Monnet: Judge Luther Bohanon and the Desegregation of Oklahoma City's Public Schools (Muskogee, Okla.: Western Heritage Books, 1983).
- Jace Weaver, Then to the Rock Let Me Fly: Luther Bohanon and Judicial Activism (Norman: University of Oklahoma Press, 1993).

Legal offices
Preceded by William Robert Wallace	Judge of the United States District Court for the Eastern District of Oklahoma; Judge of the United States District Court for the Northern District of Oklahoma; Judge of the United States District Court for the Western District of Oklahoma; 1961–1974	Succeeded by H. Dale Cook
Preceded by Stephen Sanders Chandler Jr.	Chief Judge of the United States District Court for the Western District of Oklahoma; 1969–1972	Succeeded by Frederick Alvin Daugherty
