= John E. Dowdell =

American judge (born 1955)

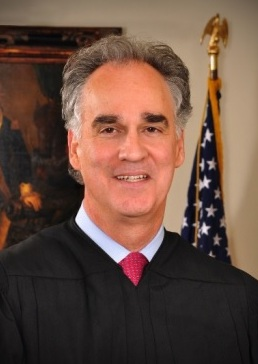

Senior Judge of the United States District Court for the Northern District of Oklahoma
- Incumbent
- Assumed office June 21, 2021

Chief Judge of the United States District Court for the Northern District of Oklahoma
- In office March 14, 2019 – June 21, 2021
- Preceded by: Gregory Kent Frizzell
- Succeeded by: John F. Heil III

Judge of the United States District Court for the Northern District of Oklahoma
- In office December 12, 2012 – June 21, 2021
- Appointed by: Barack Obama
- Preceded by: Terence C. Kern
- Succeeded by: John D. Russell

Personal details
- Born: January 22, 1955 (age 71) Tulsa, Oklahoma
- Education: Wake Forest University (BA); University of Tulsa (JD)

John Edward Dowdell (born January 22, 1955) is a senior United States district judge of the United States District Court for the Northern District of Oklahoma.

== Biography ==
Dowdell was born in Tulsa, Oklahoma, where he attended Bishop Kelley High School. He received his Bachelor of Arts degree in 1978 from Wake Forest University, where he played football for the Demon Deacons as a Wide Receiver and Defensive Back from 1973 to 1977. Among his teammates are United States Senator Richard Burr and Charlie Crist, the former Governor of Florida. He received his Juris Doctor in 1981 from the University of Tulsa College of Law. He served as a law clerk for Judge William Judson Holloway, Jr. of the United States Court of Appeals for the Tenth Circuit from 1981 to 1983. After his clerkship, Dowdell joined the law firm of Norman, Wohlgemuth, Chandler & Dowdell, P.C., in Tulsa, Oklahoma, in 1983, becoming partner in 1987. He handled civil and criminal matters in both trial and appellate courts. He spent 29 years in private practice where he was involved in six cases before the U.S. Supreme Court, litigated numerous cases in front of the Tenth Circuit, and performed extensive pro bono representation on behalf of criminal defendants. Beginning in 1999, he served on a pro bono basis as an Adjunct Settlement Judge in the United States District Court for the Northern District of Oklahoma.

=== Federal judicial service ===
On February 29, 2012, President Barack Obama nominated Dowdell to serve as a District Judge for the United States District Court for the Northern District of Oklahoma. He was nominated to the seat vacated Judge Terence C. Kern, who assumed senior status in 2010. The Senate Judiciary Committee held a hearing on his nomination on May 9, 2012 and reported his nomination to the floor on June 7, 2012.

On December 11, 2012, the Senate confirmed Dowdell by a 95–0 vote. He received his judicial commission on December 12, 2012. He became Chief Judge on March 14, 2019. On June 21, 2021, Dowdell assumed senior status due to a certified disability.

Legal offices
Preceded by Terence C. Kern	Judge of the United States District Court for the Northern District of Oklahoma; 2012–2021	Succeeded by John D. Russell
Preceded by Gregory Kent Frizzell	Chief Judge of the United States District Court for the Northern District of Oklahoma; 2019–2021	Succeeded by John F. Heil III
