= Lois Romano =

American journalist

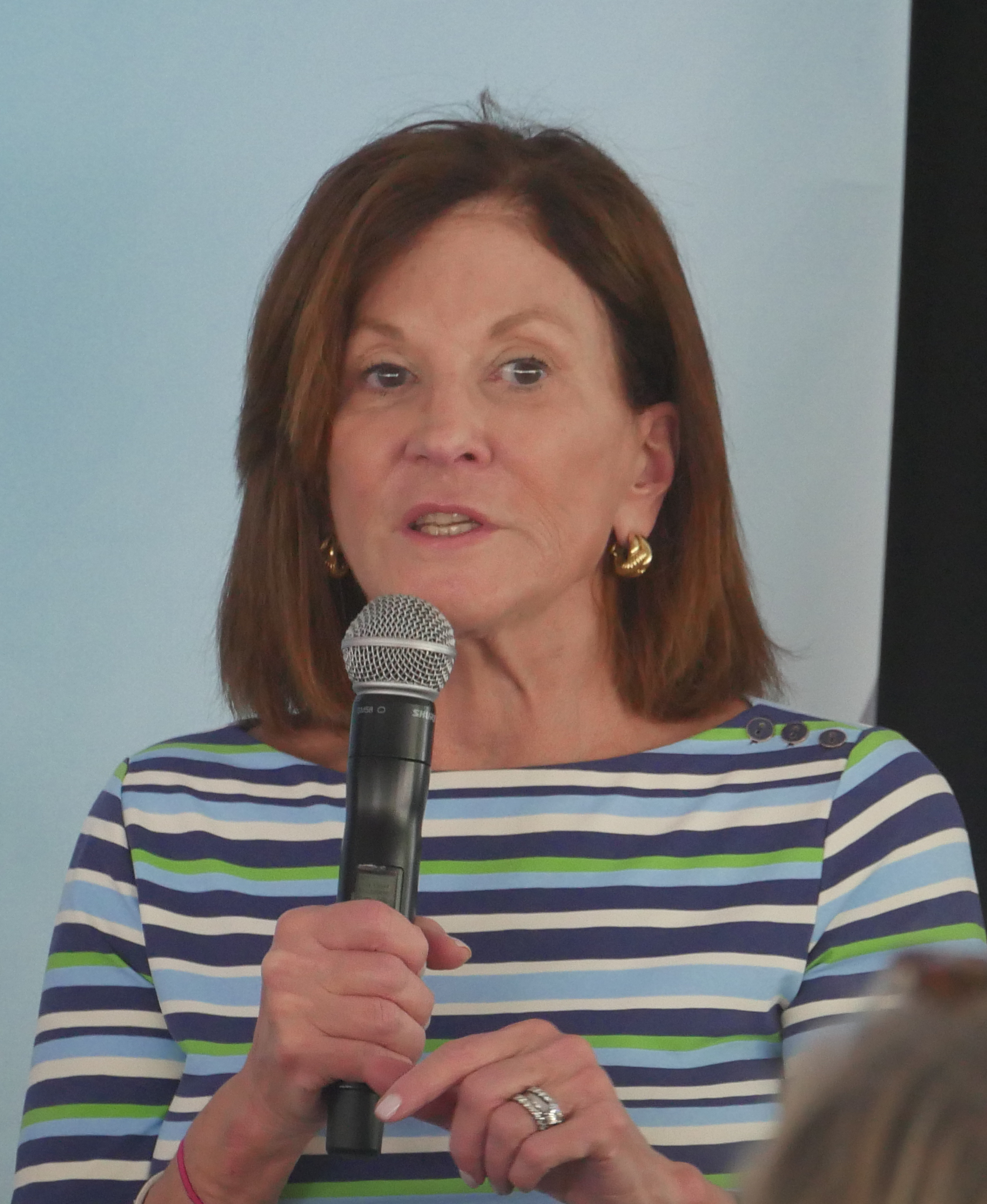
- at the 2026 Gaithersburg Book Festival
- Occupation: Journalist

Lois Romano is an American journalist who was an editor, political writer, and columnist for The Washington Post and Politico.

She is the author of the New York Times bestseller, An Inconvenient Widow, The Torment, Trial and Triumph of Mary Todd Lincoln, for Simon & Schuster, which was published in May 2026. The book received praise from historians Doris Kearns Goodwin and Jon Meacham. The book also received favorable reviews from The New York Times, The Wall Street Journal, and The New Yorker.

== Career ==
During her long career at the Post, she covered seven presidential races, served as a columnist, and was a regional correspondent based in Tulsa. Romano started at the Post in the paper’s acclaimed Style section, writing in-depth profiles on personalities like Donald Trump, Joe Biden, Hillary Clinton, Jesse Jackson Gary Hart, Sen. John Kerry during his presidential campaign, and Michelle Obama. In 2000, she wrote a seven-part biographical series for the Post's National section on George W. Bush. In 2007, a dozen women who had worked for Hillary Clinton since Bill Clinton's first presidential campaign, and were now running her presidential campaign, posed for a front page story written by Romano on "Hillaryland".

As a regional correspondent, Romano covered national issues including race relations, the fall of Enron, the death penalty, and both Oklahoma City bombing trials in Denver. In addition, Romano covered congressional and gubernatorial races. In 1991, she created and designed the Post's personality column, "The Reliable Source", which became a well-read and high-impact feature at the paper.

In the spring of 2008, Romano was a fellow at the Institute of Politics at Harvard College and taught a study group on the general election. In 2017, she joined the staff of the IOP as a strategic advisor. She was on the adjunct faculty at American University and has taught a variety of courses, including "How the News Media Have Shaped American History". In 2009, she was a fellow at the Hoover Institution at Stanford University.

After Barack Obama was elected president, she created the Post's video series "The Obama Era: Voices of Power" to profile American politicians who impact the political process.

In 2011, she left the paper for Newsweek/ Daily Beast, in 2012, joined Politico as a senior political reporter. Politico was started by her former Washington Post colleagues, John F. Harris and Jim VandeHei. After covering the presidential campaign, she became first editorial director of Politico events. She was instrumental in shaping live editorial programming and content for the organization's dozens of issue-driven events, as well as its largest event series, Women Rule and What Works.

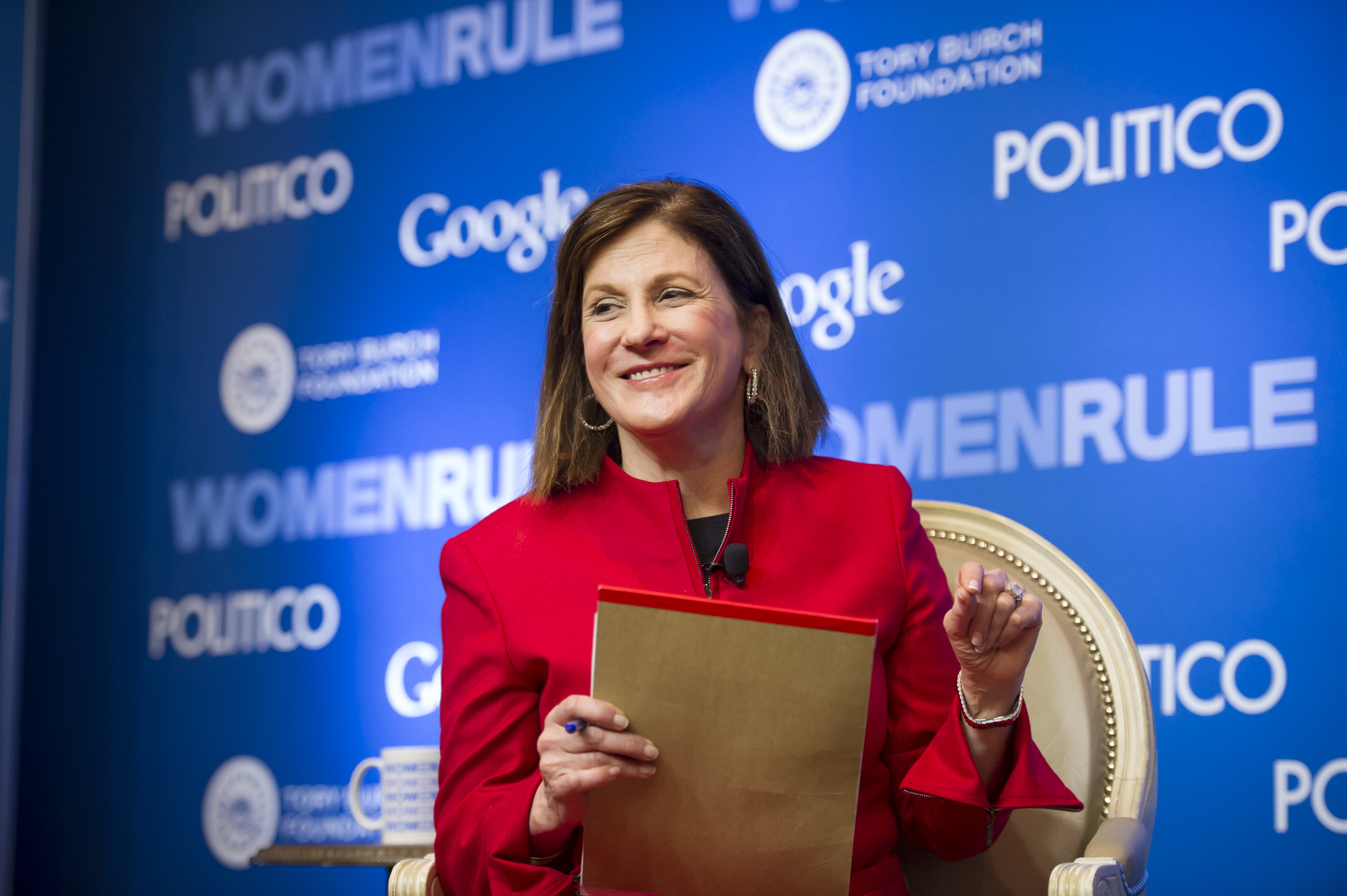
at 2014 Politico's Women Rule

In 2015, the Washington Post announced that she would return to the newspaper as the Editor of Washington Post Live and "will report directly to Martin Baron." As the editor of Washington Post Live, she raised the profile of the platform by linking it to the outlet's award-winning enterprise journalism and utilizing its deep bench of seasoned journalists as moderators. She also created the high value editorial content, such as the successful Pre-Game series before presidential debates, and the Security Tomorrow," conversations with columnist David Ignatius. Working with engineers, Romano helped develop the platform's first App. Working with newsroom leadership in 2016, Romano arranged for the Post to have its first-ever political convention venues outside the official workspaces in both Cleveland and Philadelphia.

== Personal life ==
Romano is married to Sven Erik Holmes, a former federal judge, who was also the Vice Chairman, Legal, Risk and Regulatory, and Chief Legal Officer for KPMG LLP, the global accounting firm. They have two daughters.
