= Cathedral Caverns State Park =

State park in Alabama, United States

- Location within Alabama
- Interactive map of Cathedral Caverns State Park
- Location: Marshall County, Alabama, United States
- Coordinates: 34°34′24″N 86°13′20″W
- Area: 493 acres (200 ha)
- Established: 1987 (state purchase); 2000 (park opened)
- Administrator: Alabama Department of Conservation and Natural Resources
- Designation: Alabama state park
- Website: Official website

U.S. National Natural Landmark
- Designated: June 1972

Cathedral Caverns State Park is a 493-acre (200 ha) public recreation area and natural history preserve in Kennamer Cove, Alabama, located approximately 5 miles (8.0 km) northeast of Grant and 7 miles (11 km) southeast of Woodville in Marshall County. The park, first known as Bats Cave, was developed as a tourist attraction in the 1950s. Cathedral Caverns was declared a National Natural Landmark in 1972 and opened as a state park in 2000.

== Description ==
Cathedral Caverns is a karst cave with a large stalagmite forest covering approximately 3 acres (1.2 ha). The public portion of the cave extends along 8-foot-wide (2.4 m) wheelchair-accessible, concrete walkways for approximately 3,500 feet (1,100 m) and has some 2 miles (3.2 km) of paths; another 2,700 feet (820 m) extend beyond the end of the pathway. Some 11,000 feet (3,400 m) have been surveyed and explored; only experienced cavers are allowed to go beyond the developed trail. The cave system laid claim to many world records in its commercial heyday though their accuracy has been disputed.

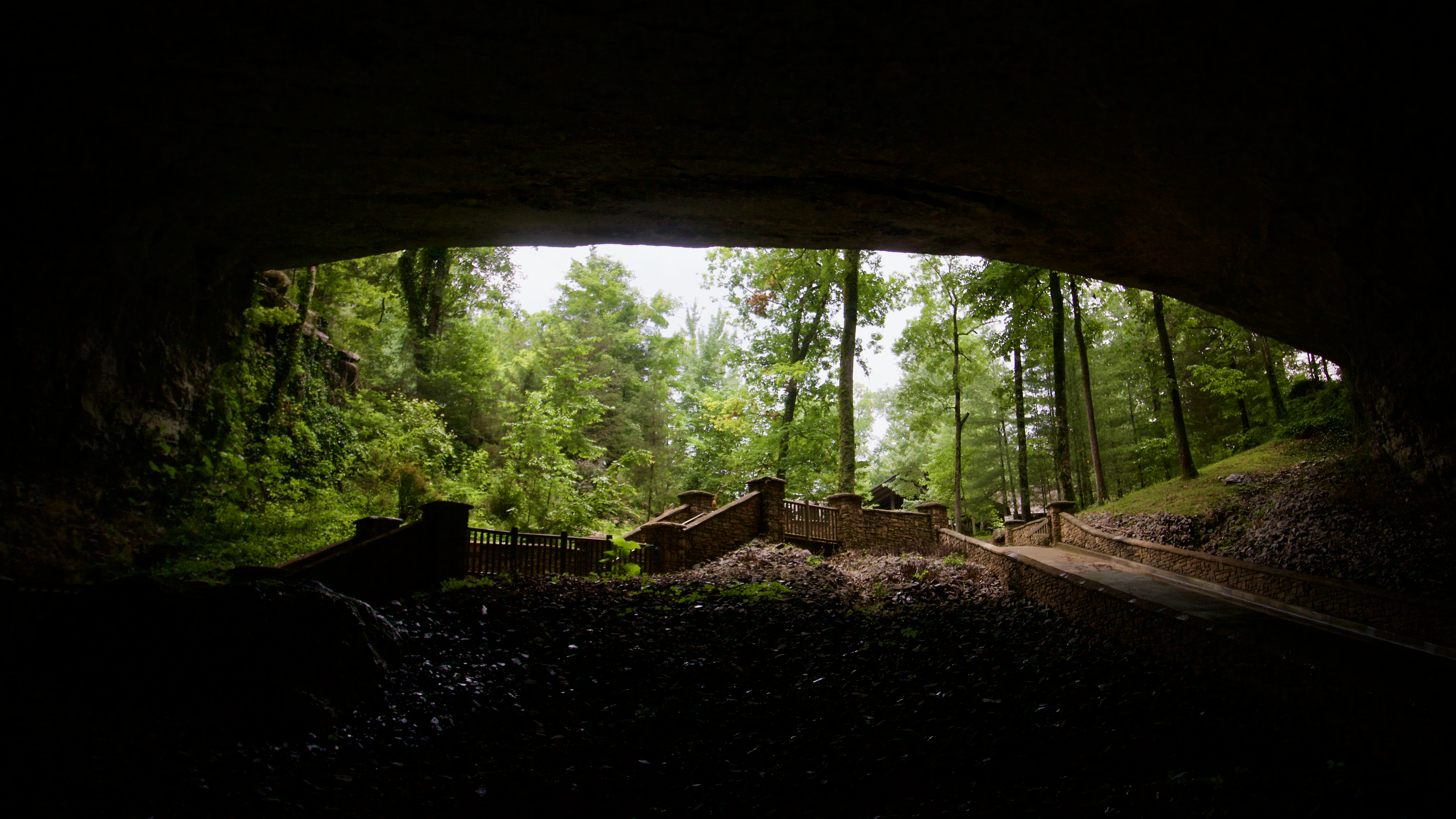
Cathedral Cavern Entrance 2019

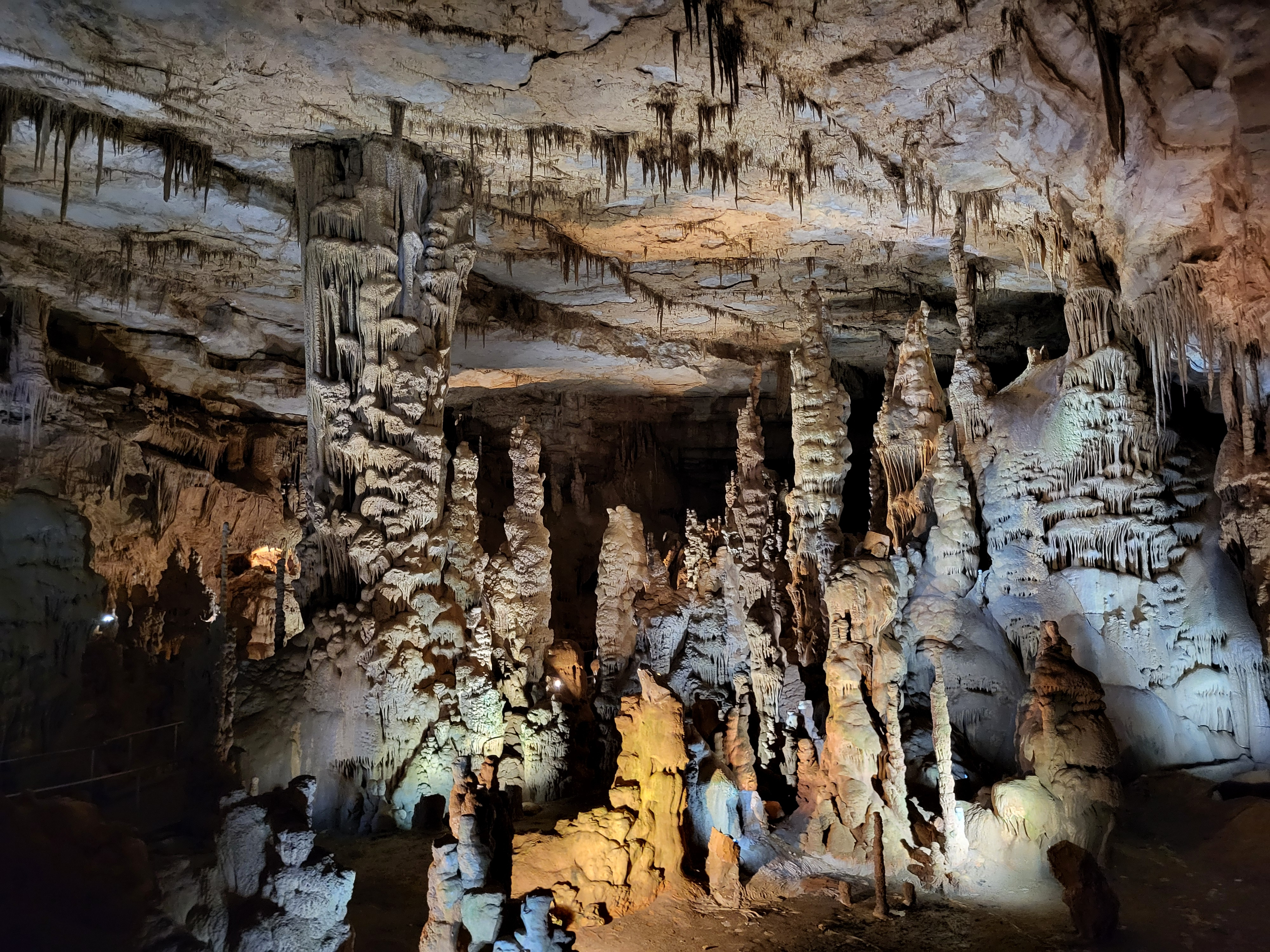
Cathedral Caverns Interior 2025

Features

Notable features of the caverns include:

- an entrance measuring 25 feet (7.6 m) tall and 128 feet (39 m), believed to be the world's widest entrance to a commercial cave;
- the column known as Goliath, one of the largest stalagmites in the world measuring 45 feet (14 m) tall and 243 feet (74 m) in circumference;
- a large flowstone "waterfall", 32 feet (9.8 m) tall and 135 feet (41 m) long;
- an "improbable" stalagmite, only 3 inches (76 mm) in diameter at its base and rising at a 45-degree angle from a rock formation to the cave ceiling 25 feet (7.6 m) above;
- The Big Room, 792 feet (241 m) long and 200 feet (61 m) wide;
- Mystery River, which flows through the cavern and due to limited outflow may cause flooding after heavy rain.

== History ==
Archaeological excavations at the mouth of Cathedral Caverns have indicated occupation by Native Americans as recently as 200 years ago and perhaps as early as 7000 BCE.

The area around the caverns was settled by the Kennamer family and became known as Kennamers Cove. During the Civil War, the Kennamer family lived in the cave for an extended period of time after their farmhouse was burned down by Union soldiers.

The cave was maintained as a tourist attraction by Jacob "Jay" Gurley from 1955 to 1974. It was sold at auction in 1975 to Tom German, who in turn sold it to the State of Alabama in 1987. After funding delays, the state began restoration work in 1995. The cavern was re-opened to the public as Cathedral Caverns State Park in May 2000.

== Awards ==
In September 2020, Cathedral Caverns State Park was one of eleven Alabama State Parks awarded Tripadvisor’s Traveler’s Choice Award, which recognizes businesses and attractions that earn consistently high user reviews.

== Activities and amenities ==
The park offers cave tours, gem mining, and facilities for picnicking as well as improved, primitive, and backcountry camping sites.

== In popular culture ==
The caverns appear in two motion pictures: in 1983, principal photography for the horror film Secrets of the Phantom Caverns took place there; and in 1995, they provided cave settings for the Disney film Tom and Huck.
