= Terence C. Kern =

American judge (born 1944)

Senior Judge of the United States District Court for the Northern District of Oklahoma
- Incumbent
- Assumed office January 4, 2010

Chief Judge of the United States District Court for the Northern District of Oklahoma
- In office 1996–2003
- Preceded by: Thomas Rutherford Brett
- Succeeded by: Sven Erik Holmes

Judge of the United States District Court for the Northern District of Oklahoma
- In office June 9, 1994 – January 4, 2010
- Appointed by: Bill Clinton
- Preceded by: Seat established by 104 Stat. 5089
- Succeeded by: John E. Dowdell

Personal details
- Born: September 25, 1944 (age 81) Clinton, Oklahoma, U.S.
- Education: Oklahoma State University (BS); University of Oklahoma (JD); University of Virginia (LLM)

Terence Curtis Kern (born September 25, 1944) is a senior United States district judge of the United States District Court for the Northern District of Oklahoma.

== Education and career ==
Kern was born in Clinton, Oklahoma. He received a Bachelor of Science degree from Oklahoma State University in 1966, a Juris Doctor from the University of Oklahoma College of Law in 1969, and a Master of Laws in Judicial Process from the University of Virginia School of Law in 2004.

While at Oklahoma State University, he was in the Army Reserve Officers' Training Corps from 1962 to 1964. He was in the Oklahoma Army National Guard from September 1969 to April 1970 and the United States Army Reserve from March 1970 to August 1975, achieving the rank of specialist 4.

He was a general attorney of the Federal Trade Commission, Division of Compliance, Bureau of Deceptive Practices from 1969 to 1970. He was in private practice in Ardmore, Oklahoma from 1970 to 1994.

=== Federal judicial service ===
On March 9, 1994, Kern was nominated by President Bill Clinton to a new seat on the United States District Court for the Northern District of Oklahoma created by 104 Stat. 5089. He was confirmed by the United States Senate on June 8, 1994, and received his commission on June 9, 1994. He served as chief judge from 1996 to 2003. He assumed senior status on January 4, 2010.

=== Notable case ===
On January 14, 2014, Kern held that the Oklahoma Constitution's definition of marriage as limited to "the union of one man and one woman" violates the Equal Protection Clause of the Fourteenth Amendment. The suit, Bishop v. Oklahoma, had been filed by two lesbian couples against the Tulsa County Clerk and others. The ruling has been stayed pending appeal. The amendment banning same-sex marriage was passed by the voters in 2004, and its legislative history was cited in the ruling.

== Sources ==
Legal offices
Preceded by Seat established by 104 Stat. 5089	Judge of the United States District Court for the Northern District of Oklahoma; 1994–2010	Succeeded by John E. Dowdell
Preceded by Thomas Rutherford Brett	Chief Judge of the United States District Court for the Northern District of Oklahoma; 1996–2003	Succeeded by Sven Erik Holmes
