= USS Slater =

Cannon-class destroyer escort

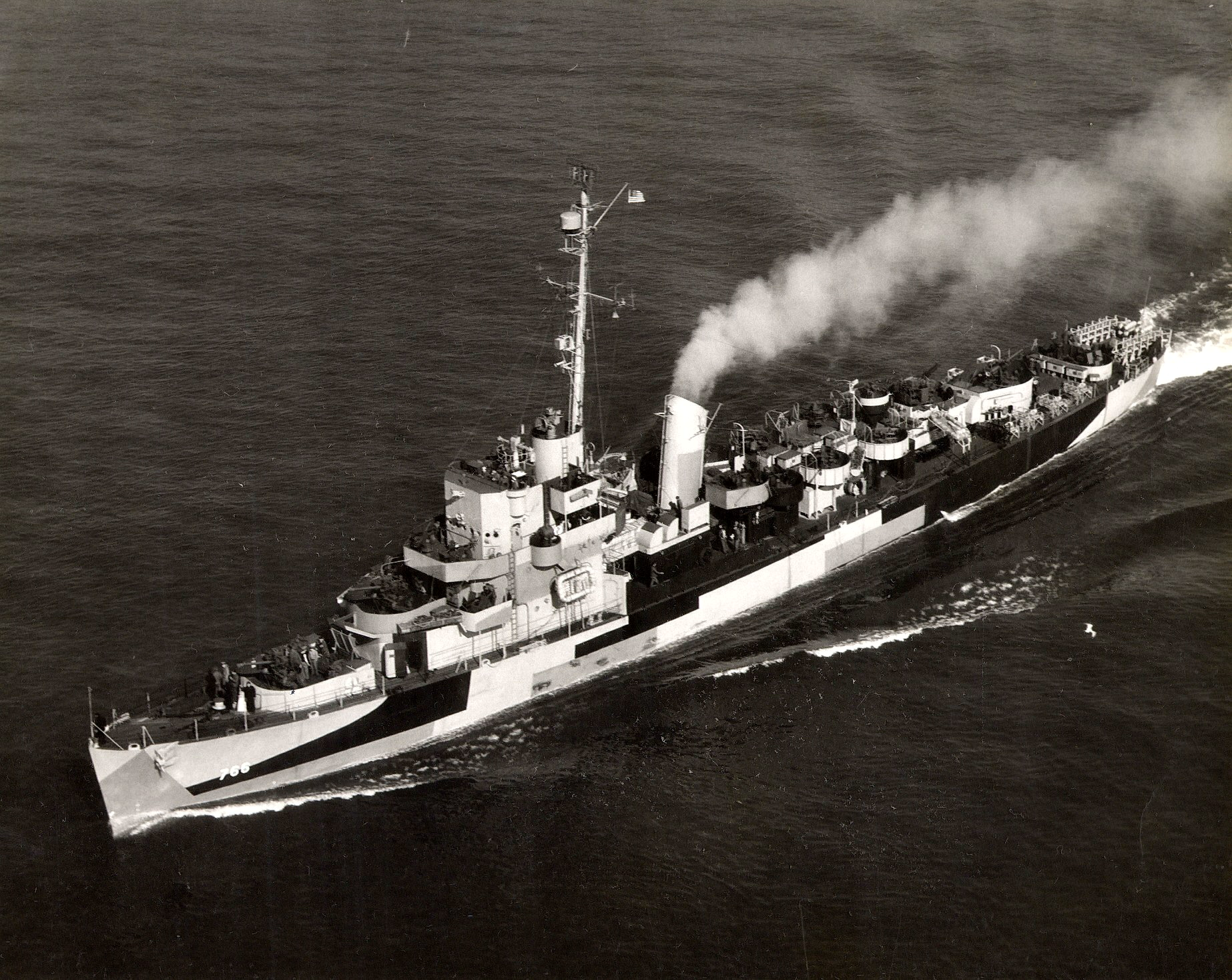
- USS Slater during World War II

History

United States
- Name: USS Slater
- Namesake: Frank O. Slater
- Builder: Tampa Shipbuilding Company, Tampa, Florida
- Laid down: 9 March 1943
- Launched: 13 February 1944
- Commissioned: 1 May 1944
- Decommissioned: 26 September 1947
- Stricken: 7 March 1951
- Identification: DE-766
- Fate: Transferred to Greece, 1 March 1951

Greece
- Name: Aetos
- Acquired: 1 March 1951
- Decommissioned: 5 July 1991
- Identification: D01
- Fate: Returned to US and preserved as memorial in Albany, New York

General characteristics
- Class & type: Cannon-class destroyer escort
- Displacement: 1,240 long tons (1,260 t)
- Length: 306 ft (93 m)
- Beam: 36 ft 8 in (11.18 m)
- Draft: 8 ft 9 in (2.67 m)
- Propulsion: 4 GM Mod. 16-278A diesel engines with electric drive; 6,000 shp (4,474 kW); 2 screws
- Speed: 21 knots (39 km/h; 24 mph)
- Range: 10,800 nmi (20,000 km; 12,400 mi) at 12 kn (22 km/h; 14 mph)
- Complement: 15 officers, 201 enlisted
- Armament: As built: 3 × single 3 in (76 mm)/50 cal. guns; 2 × Bofors 40 mm L/60 gun AA guns (1×2); 10 × single 20 mm guns AA guns; 1 × triple 21 inch (533 mm) torpedo tubes; 8 × depth charge projectors; 1 × Hedgehog anti-submarine mortar; 2 × depth charge racks
- USS Slater (Destroyer Escort)
- U.S. National Register of Historic Places
- U.S. National Historic Landmark
- Location within New York Location within the United States
- Location: Port of Albany, Albany, New York
- Coordinates: 42°38′34.6″N 73°44′58.3″W
- Built: 1944
- Architect: Tampa Shipbuilding
- NRHP reference No.: 98000393

Significant dates
- Added to NRHP: 7 May 1998
- Designated NHL: 2 March 2012

USS Slater (DE-766) is a Cannon-class destroyer escort that served in the United States Navy and later in the Hellenic (Greek) Navy. Following service during World War II, the ship was transferred to Greece and renamed Aetos. Decommissioned in 1991, the destroyer escort was returned to the United States.

USS Slater is now a museum ship on the Hudson River in Albany, New York. As of 2020, fewer than 12 destroyer escorts survive, with Slater the only one in its wartime configuration and the only one afloat in the United States. Slater was designated a National Historic Landmark on 2 March 2012.

USS Slater was struck by the Hudson River touring ship Dutch Apple on 10 September 2019. A mechanical problem aboard Dutch Apple was blamed for the collision.

== Namesake ==
Frank Olga Slater was born on 19 December 1920 in Kennamer Cove, Alabama, one of 12 children of James Lafayette Slater, a sharecropper, and Lenora (Morgan) Slater. He grew up in Fyffe, Alabama. He enlisted in the United States Naval Reserve on 10 February 1942. Upon completion of his basic training, he was transferred to the Receiving Station at Pearl Harbor and assigned to the heavy cruiser USS San Francisco on 4 April 1942. On 12 November 1942, he was killed in action at his battle station during the Naval Battle of Guadalcanal. He was posthumously awarded the Navy Cross.

== Construction and career ==
USS Slater was laid down on 9 March 1943, she was christened on 20 Feb 1944 by Lenora Slater, mother of Frank Olga Slater, and launched on 13 February 1944. The ship was commissioned on 1 May 1944. She was built at the Tampa Shipbuilding Company in Tampa, Florida, for an estimated cost of $3,399,000 (adjusted for inflation, roughly $54,777,341.00 in 2022).

After a shakedown cruise near Bermuda in June 1944, Slater assisted with the transfer of torpedoes from the captured German submarine U-505, from Bermuda to Maryland. She was then sent to Key West, where she served as a sonar school ship. On 3 October 1944, Slater reported for convoy duty in Brooklyn, New York; she spent the next 7 months alternating between convoy duty and additional training in Portland, Maine. By the end of the war in Europe, Slater escorted a total of five convoys to the United Kingdom, listed below:

Dates	Ports
17–20 October 1944	Brooklyn, New York to Liverpool, England
21 October 1944	Milford Haven, Wales
14–19 December 1944	Glasgow, Scotland (Greenock)
22–28 January 1945	Cardiff, Wales
10–14 March 1945	Cardiff, Wales
28 April - 4 May 1945	Cardiff, Wales

In June 1945, Slater headed for the Pacific, stopping at the US Virgin Islands, Guantánamo Bay Naval Base, and Coco Solo, Panama. She went through the Panama Canal on 28 June 1945 and stopped at San Diego before sailing to Pearl Harbor. From there, she joined Task Unit 33.2.4 at Manila in September and escorted it to Yokohama. Slater engaged in support operations in the Pacific through the remainder of the year. She made another passage through the canal on her way to Norfolk for deactivation. Slater was placed in the reserve fleet at Green Cove Springs, Florida, in 1947.

=== Greek service ===
On 1 March 1951, Slater was transferred to the Hellenic Navy under the Truman Doctrine and renamed Aetos ("Eagle") (D01). Along with three other Cannon-class ships, she made up what was known as the "Wild Beasts" Flotilla. The ship did patrol duty in the eastern Aegean and the Dodecanese and also served as a training vessel for naval cadets. Aetos was decommissioned in 1991, and Greece donated the ship to the Destroyer Escort Sailors Association.

=== Museum ship ===
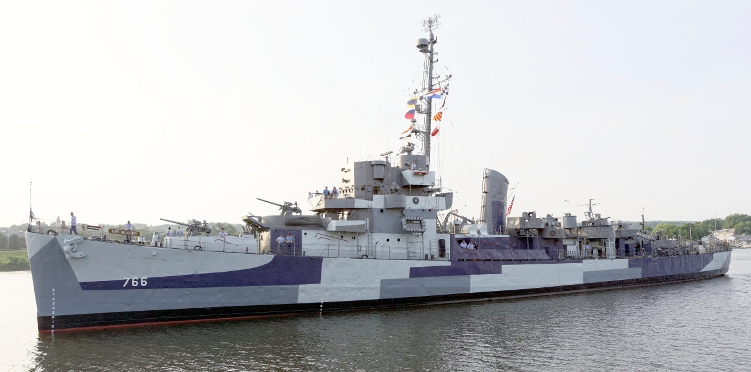

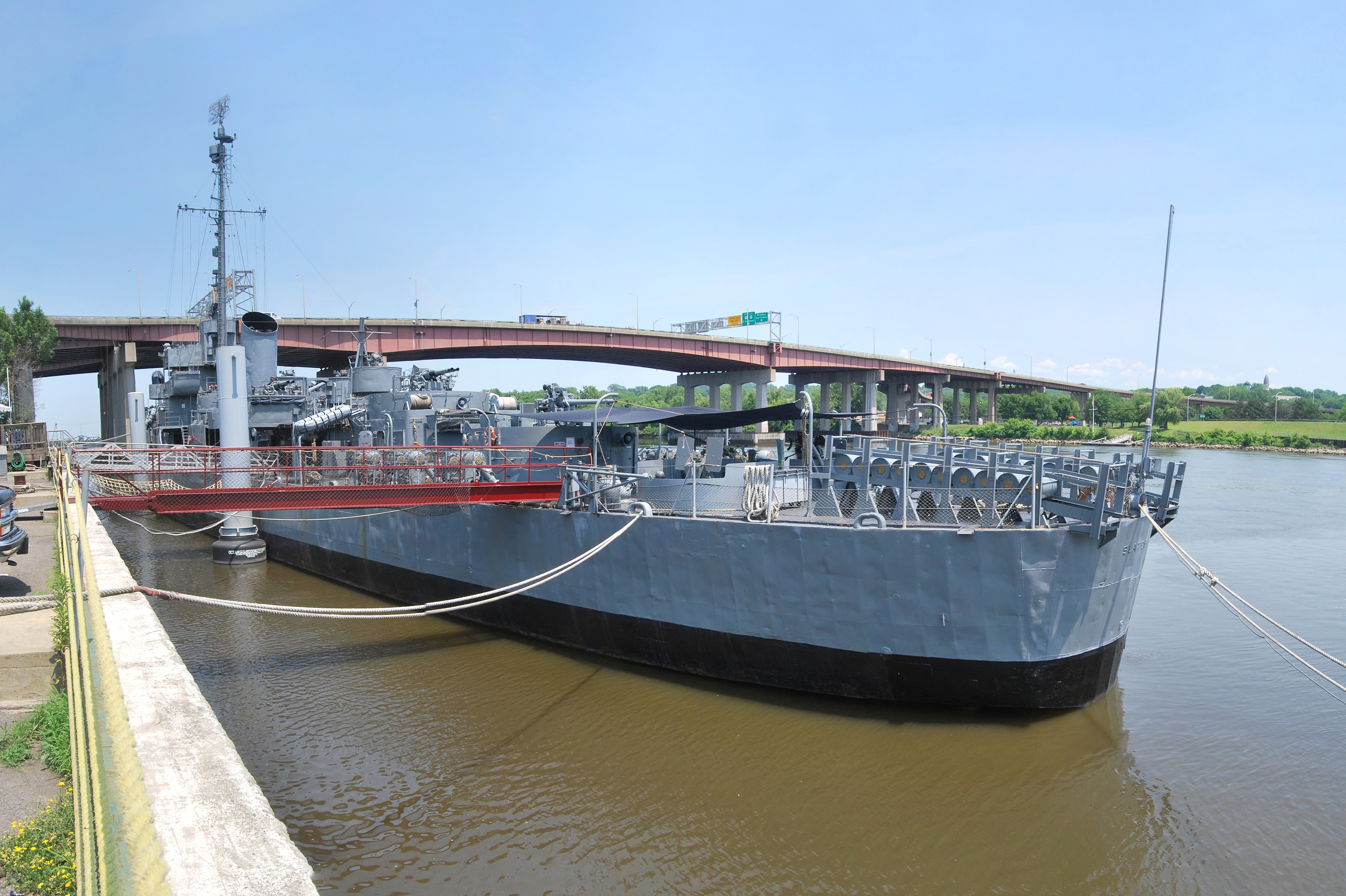
The Slater at Albany (2011)

Destroyer escort sailors from around the nation donated more than $250,000 ($590,948 today) to bring Slater back to the United States as a museum ship. In 1993, a Ukrainian ocean-going tugboat Gepard towed the ship from Crete to New York City, where she was docked next to the aircraft carrier USS Intrepid. Volunteers began restoring the ship and seeking a permanent home for her; Albany, New York, was decided upon. On 26 October 1997, Slater arrived at the Port of Albany. In January 2006, a welder accidentally started a fire aboard Slater, which caused some minor damage to the ship. Repairs were completed within a few months. Restoration of the ship remains an ongoing project.

On 7 May 1998, Slater was listed on the National Register of Historic Places.

Slater was refitted several times during her long service with two navies. One of her depth-charge racks and four "K-gun" depth-charge launchers have been removed. Two twin Bofors 40 mm guns have been added, and the 10 single 20 mm guns have been replaced with nine twin mounts.

== Appearances in film ==
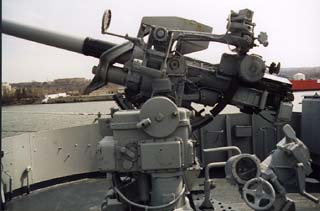
3-inch/50 caliber gun aboard USS Slater (DE-766)

Slater has been featured in three motion pictures. The ship was seen in The Guns of Navarone (1961) and I Aliki sto Naftiko (Η Αλίκη στο Ναυτικό/Alice in the Navy, filmed in 1961) while in Greek service.

In August 2008, part of the Japanese film Last Operations Under the Orion (2009) was filmed on board. Although the film depicts a battle between a Japanese submarine and a US Navy destroyer, Slater was used, instead, despite being a destroyer escort. Scenes were filmed on board, and a scale model of the ship was built and used for computer-graphics imagery shots at sea.

== See also ==
- List of museum ships
- List of National Historic Landmarks in New York
- National Register of Historic Places listings in Albany, New York
