= H. Dale Cook =

American judge (1924–2008)

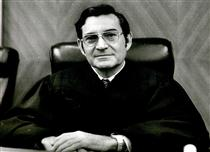

Senior Judge of the United States District Court for the Eastern District of Oklahoma Senior Judge of the United States District Court for the Northern District of Oklahoma Senior Judge of the United States District Court for the Western District of Oklahoma
- In office January 1, 1992 – September 22, 2008

Chief Judge of the United States District Court for the Northern District of Oklahoma
- In office 1979–1992
- Preceded by: Allen E. Barrow
- Succeeded by: James O. Ellison

Judge of the United States District Court for the Eastern District of Oklahoma Judge of the United States District Court for the Northern District of Oklahoma Judge of the United States District Court for the Western District of Oklahoma
- In office December 20, 1974 – January 1, 1992
- Appointed by: Gerald Ford
- Preceded by: Luther L. Bohanon
- Succeeded by: Michael Burrage

Personal details
- Born: Harold Dale Cook; April 14, 1924 Guthrie, Oklahoma, U.S.
- Died: September 22, 2008 (aged 84)
- Education: University of Oklahoma (B.S.); University of Oklahoma College of Law (LL.B.)

Harold Dale Cook (April 14, 1924 – September 22, 2008), also known as H. Dale Cook, was a United States district judge of the United States District Court for the Eastern District of Oklahoma, the United States District Court for the Northern District of Oklahoma and the United States District Court for the Western District of Oklahoma.

== Education and career ==
Born on April 14, 1924, in Guthrie, Oklahoma, Cook graduated from Guthrie High School in 1942. He served in the United States Army Air Corps as a lieutenant from 1944 to 1945. He served in the United States Air Force Reserve from 1945 to 1953. He received a Bachelor of Science degree in 1949 from the University of Oklahoma. He received a Bachelor of Laws in 1950 from the University of Oklahoma College of Law.

Cook was in private practice in Guthrie from 1950 to 1951. He was county attorney of Logan County, Oklahoma from 1951 to 1954. He served as First Assistant United States Attorney of the Western District of Oklahoma from 1954 to 1958. He was in private practice in Oklahoma City from 1958 to 1963. He was legal counsel and advisor to Governor Henry Bellmon of Oklahoma from 1963 to 1965. He returned to private practice in Oklahoma City from 1965 to 1971. He was President and Chairman of the Board of the Shepherd Mall State Bank in Oklahoma City from 1969 to 1971. He was the Director of the Bureau of Hearings and Appeals of the Social Security Administration from 1971 to 1974.

== Federal judicial service ==
Cook was nominated by President Gerald Ford on December 2, 1974, to a joint seat on the United States District Court for the Eastern District of Oklahoma, the United States District Court for the Northern District of Oklahoma and the United States District Court for the Western District of Oklahoma vacated by Judge Luther L. Bohanon. He was confirmed by the United States Senate on December 18, 1974, and received his commission on December 20, 1974. He served as Chief Judge of the Northern District from 1979 to 1992. He assumed senior status on January 1, 1992. His service terminated on September 22, 2008, due to his death.

== Notable cases ==
In the 1980s, Cook and other federal judges in his district presided over thousands of cases as the civil docket in Oklahoma swelled due to the region-wide oil bust and savings and loan scandal.

== Courthouse naming attempt ==
In July 2009, Congressman John Sullivan submitted a bill to rename the Federal building and United States courthouse in Tulsa, Oklahoma, the "H. Dale Cook Federal Building and United States Courthouse." That bill passed the United States House of Representatives and proceeded on to the United States Senate. The bill died in the Senate's Committee on the Environment and Public Works because Chair Barbara Boxer (D-CA) never brought the bill for a vote in the committee, despite the fact that it had been placed on the committee's agenda at least twice. Though the entire Oklahoma congressional designation (including Democrats) supported the bill, some local Democrats in Oklahoma complained that they didn't want the building named after a Republican, despite the fact that Cook, when Chief Judge of the Northern District of Oklahoma, had been responsible for restoring the building.

== Sources ==
- "Revered federal judge H. Dale Cook dies". Tulsa World. 2008-09-23.

Legal offices
Preceded by Luther L. Bohanon	Judge of the United States District Court for the Eastern District of Oklahoma; Judge of the United States District Court for the Northern District of Oklahoma; Judge of the United States District Court for the Western District of Oklahoma; 1974–1992	Succeeded by Michael Burrage
Preceded by Allen E. Barrow	Chief Judge of the United States District Court for the Northern District of Oklahoma; 1974–1992	Succeeded by James O. Ellison
