= Allen E. Barrow =

American judge

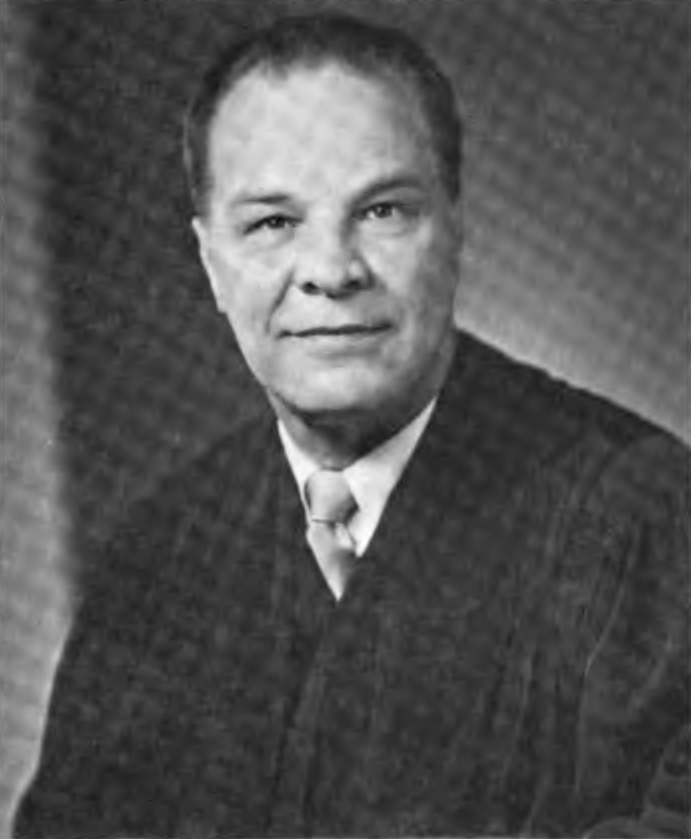

Chief Judge of the United States District Court for the Northern District of Oklahoma
- In office 1962–1979
- Preceded by: Royce H. Savage
- Succeeded by: H. Dale Cook

Judge of the United States District Court for the Northern District of Oklahoma
- In office August 2, 1962 – February 26, 1979
- Appointed by: John F. Kennedy
- Preceded by: Royce H. Savage
- Succeeded by: James O. Ellison

Personal details
- Born: Allen Edward Barrow; January 22, 1914 Okemah, Oklahoma, U.S.
- Died: February 26, 1979 (aged 65)
- Education: University of Oklahoma (B.A.); Southeastern State College (LL.B.)

Allen Edward Barrow (January 22, 1914 – February 26, 1979) was a United States district judge of the United States District Court for the Northern District of Oklahoma.

== Education and career ==
Born in Okemah, Oklahoma, Barrow received a Bachelor of Arts degree from the University of Oklahoma in 1937 and a Bachelor of Laws from Southeastern State College (now Southeastern Oklahoma State University) in 1942. He was in the United States Army during World War II from 1942 to 1946, and achieved the rank of major. He then entered private practice in Tulsa, Oklahoma from 1946 to 1951. He was assistant chief counsel and acting chief counsel of the Southwestern Power Administration of the United States Department of the Interior in Tulsa from 1951 to 1954, then returned to private practice of law in Tulsa until 1962.

== Federal judicial service ==
On July 18, 1962, Barrow was nominated by President John F. Kennedy to a seat on the United States District Court for the Northern District of Oklahoma vacated by Judge Royce H. Savage. He was confirmed by the United States Senate on August 1, 1962, and received his commission on August 2, 1962.

Barrow served as Chief Judge from 1962 until his death on February 26, 1979.

== Sources ==
Legal offices
| Preceded by Royce H. Savage | Judge of the United States District Court for the Northern District of Oklahoma; 1962–1979 | Succeeded by James O. Ellison |
| Preceded by Royce H. Savage | Chief Judge of the United States District Court for the Northern District of Oklahoma; 1962–1979 | Succeeded by H. Dale Cook |
