= Gunters Mountain =

Mountain in United States of America

- Location within Alabama

Highest point
- Elevation: 1380+ ft (421+ m)
- Coordinates: 34°33′58″N 86°10′39″W

Geography
- Location: Jackson / Marshall counties, Alabama, U.S.
- Parent range: Appalachian Mountains
- Topo map: USGS Swearengin

Gunters Mountain is a plateau-type summit in the U.S. state of Alabama. Part of the Cumberland Plateau, Gunters Mountain separates the Cumberland Plateau from the valley of the Tennessee River.

Gunters Mountain is in Marshall County and Jackson County, just west of Guntersville Lake, a reservoir on the Tennessee River. The town of Grant is located on top of the plateau of Gunters Mountain. The mountain is located about halfway between the cities of Guntersville and Scottsboro. It is also the highest point of Marshall County.

Variant names of Gunters Mountain include Grant Mountain, Gunter Mountain, and Shell Mountain.
