= Sara E. Hill =

Cherokee Nation judge (born 1977)

Sara Hill
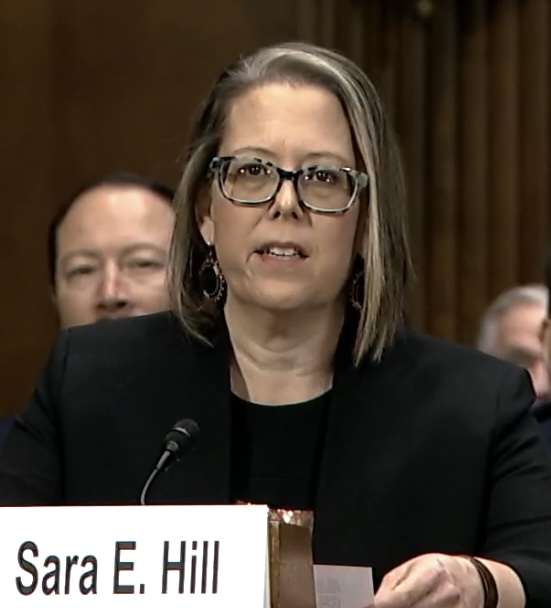

Judge of the United States District Court for the Northern District of Oklahoma
- Incumbent
- Assumed office January 2, 2024
- Appointed by: Joe Biden
- Preceded by: Claire Eagan

Attorney General of the Cherokee Nation
- In office August 29, 2019 – August 31, 2023
- Appointed by: Chuck Hoskin Jr.
- Preceded by: Todd Hembree
- Succeeded by: Chad Harsha

Secretary of Natural Resources for the Cherokee Nation
- In office October 12, 2015 – August 29, 2019
- Appointed by: Bill John Baker
- Preceded by: First appointee
- Succeeded by: Chad Harsha

Personal details
- Born: Sara Elizabeth Hill; 1977 (age 48–49) Tahlequah, Oklahoma, U.S.
- Citizenship: American; Cherokee Nation
- Education: Northeastern State University (BA); University of Tulsa (JD)

Sara Elizabeth Hill (born 1977) is a Cherokee and American attorney who has served as a United States district judge of the United States District Court for the Northern District of Oklahoma since 2024. She previously served as the attorney general of the Cherokee Nation from August 2019 to August 2023 and as the tribe's secretary of natural resources between October 2015 and August 2019.

== Early life and education ==
Sara Elizabeth Hill was born in 1977 in Tahlequah, Oklahoma, and raised in Stigler, Oklahoma. Hill's high school debate coach, Ed Cannaday, would go on to serve in the Oklahoma House of Representatives. She graduated from Northeastern State University with a Bachelor of Arts, cum laude in 2000 and with a Juris Doctor from the University of Tulsa College of Law in 2003.

== Career ==
From 2004 to 2015, Hill served as a deputy attorney general for the Cherokee Nation. In December 2014, she was sworn in as a tribal special assistant U.S. attorney in the Northern District of Oklahoma's U.S. attorney's office, a position she held concurrently as deputy attorney general. On October 12, 2015, Hill was appointed the Cherokee Nation's first secretary of natural resources by principal chief Bill John Baker and she served in that position until August 29, 2019. She was succeeded by Chad Harsha.

=== Cherokee Nation attorney general ===
On August 29, 2019, Hill was appointed as the attorney general of the Cherokee Nation by newly elected principal chief Chuck Hoskin Jr. During her tenure as attorney general the United States Supreme Court issued the landmark McGirt v. Oklahoma (2020) decision which held the Muscogee Nation reservation was never disestablished. On March 11, 2021, the Oklahoma Court of Criminal Appeals ruled in Hogner v. Oklahoma that the Cherokee Nation reservation had also never been disestablished. Hill led the Cherokee Nation's effort to build up its criminal justice system after the Hogner ruling and the Nation's defense of the Indian Child Welfare Act during the Haaland v. Brackeen (2023) litigation. In the year following the ruling, the Cherokee Nation attorney general's office went from prosecuting around 300 criminal cases to over 3,000 criminal cases. Also during her tenure, the Cherokee Nation attorney general's office successfully sought the official striking of "by blood" language from Cherokee law by the Cherokee Nation Supreme Court. Hill criticized the 2022 Oklahoma v. Castro-Huerta ruling saying "It really didn't honor the foundations of federal Indian law. It overlooked and ignored the history of the tribes." In August 2023, she resigned to enter private practice.

=== Federal judicial service ===
On October 18, 2023, President Joe Biden announced his intent to nominate Hill to fill a vacancy on the United States District Court for the Northern District of Oklahoma. Her nomination was endorsed by Senators James Lankford and Markwayne Mullin as well as Cherokee Nation principal chief Chuck Hoskin Jr. The National Congress of American Indians, Native American Rights Fund, and Inter-Tribal Council of the Five Civilized Tribes also supported her nomination. The nomination was criticized by Oklahoma Governor Kevin Stitt, who is also a member of the Cherokee Nation. On October 24, 2023, her nomination was sent to the Senate. President Biden nominated Hill to the seat vacated by Judge Claire Eagan, who assumed senior status on October 1, 2022. On November 15, 2023, a hearing on her nomination was held before the Senate Judiciary Committee. During her hearing, Senators Mike Lee and Thom Tillis questioned her about tribal sovereignty and her criticism of the Castro-Huerta decision; asking whether she would recuse herself on issues of tribal sovereignty. On December 7, 2023, her nomination was reported out of committee by a 14–7 vote. On December 19, 2023, the United States Senate invoked cloture on her nomination by a 52–14 vote, with Senator Joe Manchin voting against the motion to invoke cloture. Later that day, her nomination was confirmed by a 52–14 vote, with Senator Manchin voting against confirmation. She received her judicial commission on January 2, 2024. She was sworn in on January 6, 2024. She became the first female Native American federal judge in Oklahoma history.

== See also ==
- List of Native American jurists
- List of Native American politicians
- Native American women in politics

Legal offices
Preceded by Claire Eagan	Judge of the United States District Court for the Northern District of Oklahoma; 2024–present	Incumbent
