= James O. Ellison =

American judge (1929–2014)

Senior Judge of the United States District Court for the Northern District of Oklahoma
- In office November 7, 1994 – November 22, 2014

Chief Judge of the United States District Court for the Northern District of Oklahoma
- In office 1992–1994
- Preceded by: H. Dale Cook
- Succeeded by: Thomas Rutherford Brett

Judge of the United States District Court for the Northern District of Oklahoma
- In office November 2, 1979 – November 7, 1994
- Appointed by: Jimmy Carter
- Preceded by: Allen E. Barrow
- Succeeded by: Sven Erik Holmes

Personal details
- Born: James Oliver Ellison; January 11, 1929 St. Louis, Missouri, U.S.
- Died: November 22, 2014 (aged 85) Tulsa, Oklahoma, U.S.
- Education: University of Oklahoma (BA); University of Oklahoma College of Law (LLB)

James Oliver Ellison (January 11, 1929 – November 22, 2014) was a United States district judge of the United States District Court for the Northern District of Oklahoma.

== Education and career ==
Ellison was born on January 11, 1929, in St. Louis, Missouri, In 1946, he graduated from the Oklahoma Military Academy (located on what is now the campus of Rogers State University in Claremore, Oklahoma).

Ellison received a Bachelor of Arts degree from the University of Oklahoma in 1951 and concurrently received a Bachelor of Laws from the University of Oklahoma College of Law in 1951. He served in the United States Army from 1951 to 1953, achieving the rank of captain. He was in private practice in Red Fork, Oklahoma from 1953 to 1955, and in Tulsa, Oklahoma from 1955 to 1979.

== Federal judicial service ==
On September 28, 1979, Ellison was nominated by President Jimmy Carter to a seat on the United States District Court for the Northern District of Oklahoma vacated by Judge Allen E. Barrow. Ellison was confirmed by the United States Senate on October 31, 1979, and received his commission on November 2, 1979.

Ellison served as Chief Judge from 1992 to 1994, assuming senior status on November 7, 1994. He died in Tulsa on November 22, 2014, aged 85.

== Sources ==
Legal offices
Preceded by Allen E. Barrow	Judge of the United States District Court for the Northern District of Oklahoma; 1979–1994	Succeeded by Sven Erik Holmes
Preceded by H. Dale Cook	Chief Judge of the United States District Court for the Northern District of Oklahoma; 1992–1994	Succeeded by Thomas Rutherford Brett
