= Franklin Elmore Kennamer =

American judge (1879–1960)

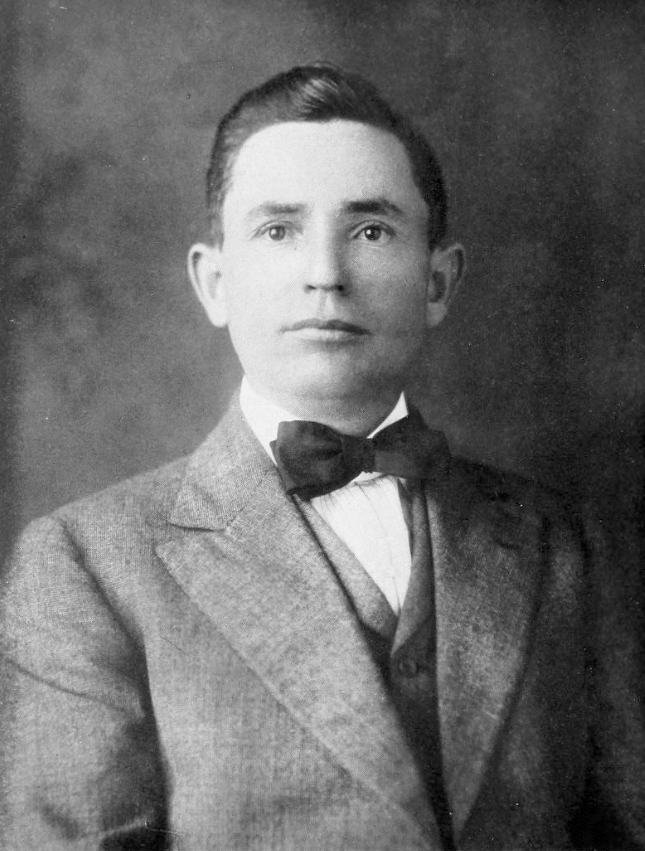

Senior Judge of the United States District Court for the Northern District of Oklahoma
- In office June 1, 1940 – May 1, 1960

Judge of the United States District Court for the Northern District of Oklahoma
- In office February 16, 1925 – June 1, 1940
- Appointed by: operation of law
- Preceded by: Seat established by 43 Stat. 945
- Succeeded by: Royce H. Savage

Judge of the United States District Court for the Eastern District of Oklahoma
- In office February 19, 1924 – February 16, 1925
- Appointed by: Calvin Coolidge
- Preceded by: Seat established by 42 Stat. 837
- Succeeded by: Seat abolished

Personal details
- Born: January 12, 1879 Kennamer Cove, Alabama
- Died: May 1, 1960 (aged 81) Nowata, Oklahoma
- Resting place: Chelsea Cemetery; Chelsea, Oklahoma
- Education: Read law

Franklin Elmore Kennamer (January 12, 1879 – May 1, 1960) was a justice of the Oklahoma Supreme Court and a United States district judge of the United States District Court for the Eastern District of Oklahoma and the United States District Court for the Northern District of Oklahoma.

== Education and career ==
Born to Seaborn F. Kennamer (1830–1915) and his wife, Nancy Elizabeth Mitchell Kennamer (1848–1898) on January 12, 1879, in Kennamer Cove, Marshall County, Alabama, Kennamer read law in 1905. He was a Colonel in the United States Army during the Spanish–American War. He was the city attorney of Madill, Oklahoma from 1915 to 1916. He was the Mayor of Madill from 1919 to 1920. He was a justice of the Oklahoma Supreme Court from 1920 to 1924.

== Federal judicial service ==
Kennamer was nominated by President Calvin Coolidge on January 28, 1924, to the United States District Court for the Eastern District of Oklahoma, to a new seat authorized by 42 Stat. 837. He was confirmed by the United States Senate on February 19, 1924, and received his commission the same day. Kennamer was reassigned by operation of law to the United States District Court for the Northern District of Oklahoma on February 16, 1925, to a new seat authorized by 43 Stat. 945. He assumed senior status due to a certified disability on June 1, 1940. His service terminated on May 1, 1960, due to his death in Nowata. He was interred in Chelsea Cemetery in Chelsea, Oklahoma.

== Sources ==
Legal offices
Preceded by Seat established by 42 Stat. 837	Judge of the United States District Court for the Eastern District of Oklahoma; 1924–1925	Succeeded by Seat abolished
Preceded by Seat established by 43 Stat. 945	Judge of the United States District Court for the Northern District of Oklahoma; 1925–1940	Succeeded by Royce H. Savage
