= United States District Court for the Northern District of Oklahoma =

United States federal district court in Oklahoma

Coordinates: 36.15123°N 95.99523°W

- (N.D. Okla.)
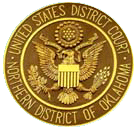
- Location: Tulsa More locations: United States Post Office and Courthouse (Tulsa); Bartlesville; Miami; Pawhuska; Vinita
- Appeals to: Tenth Circuit
- Established: February 16, 1925
- Judges: 4
- Chief Judge: John F. Heil III

Officers of the court
- U.S. Attorney: Christopher Nassar
- U.S. Marshal: Clayton D. Johnson
- www.oknd.uscourts.gov

The United States District Court for the Northern District of Oklahoma (in case citations, N.D. Okla.) is a federal court in the Tenth Circuit (except for patent claims and claims against the U.S. government under the Tucker Act, which are appealed to the Federal Circuit).

The District was established on February 16, 1925, with the transfer of a judgeship in the Eastern District to the newly established Northern district.

== Organization of the court ==
The United States District Court for the Northern District of Oklahoma is one of three federal judicial districts in Oklahoma. Court for the District is held at Tulsa.

The court's jurisdiction comprises the following counties: Craig, Creek, Delaware, Mayes, Nowata, Osage, Ottawa, Pawnee, Rogers, Tulsa, and Washington.

The United States Attorney's Office for the Northern District of Oklahoma represents the United States in civil and criminal litigation in the court. As of December 26, 2021 the United States attorney for the Northern District of Oklahoma is Clint Johnson.

== Current judges ==
As of December 2, 2025:

#	Title	Judge	Duty station	Born	Term of service			Appointed by
#	Title	Judge	Duty station	Born	Active	Chief	Senior	Appointed by
20	Chief Judge	John F. Heil III (Note: Jointly appointed to the Eastern, Northern, and Western Districts of Oklahoma.)	Tulsa	1968	2020–present	2021–present	—	Trump
21	District Judge	Sara E. Hill	Tulsa	1977	2024–present	—	—	Biden
22	District Judge	John D. Russell	Tulsa	1963	2024–present	—	—	Biden
23	District Judge	vacant	—	—	—	—	—	—
13	Senior Judge	Terence C. Kern	Tulsa	1944	1994–2010	1996–2003	2010–present	Clinton
16	Senior Judge	Claire Eagan	Tulsa	1950	2001–2022	2005–2012	2022–present	G.W. Bush
18	Senior Judge	Gregory Kent Frizzell	Tulsa	1956	2007–2025	2012–2019	2025–present	G.W. Bush
19	Senior Judge	John E. Dowdell	inactive	1955	2012–2021	2019–2021	2021–present	Obama

== Vacancies and pending nominations ==
Seat	Prior judge's duty station	Seat last held by	Vacancy reason	Date of vacancy	Nominee	Date of nomination
1	Tulsa	Gregory Kent Frizzell	Senior status	March 1, 2025	Trevor Pemberton	September 14, 2026

== Former judges ==
#	Judge	Born–died	Active service	Chief Judge	Senior status	Appointed by	Reason for termination
1	Franklin Elmore Kennamer	1879–1960	1925–1940 (Note: Reassigned from the Eastern District of Oklahoma.)	—	1940–1960	Coolidge/Operation of law	death
2	Alfred P. Murrah	1904–1975	1937–1940 (Note: Jointly appointed to the Eastern, Northern, and Western Districts of Oklahoma.)	—	—	F. Roosevelt	elevation
3	Bower Slack Broaddus	1888–1949	1940–1949	—	—	F. Roosevelt	death
4	Royce H. Savage	1904–1993	1940–1961	1949–1961	—	F. Roosevelt	resignation
5	William Robert Wallace	1886–1960	1950–1960	—	—	Truman	death
6	Luther L. Bohanon	1902–2003	1961–1974	—	1974–2003	Kennedy	death
7	Frederick Alvin Daugherty	1914–2006	1961–1982 (Note: Recess appointment; formally nominated on January 15, 1962, confirmed by the United States Senate on February 7, 1962, and received commission on February 17, 1962. Jointly appointed to the Eastern, Northern, and Western Districts of Oklahoma.)	—	1982–2006	Kennedy	death
8	Allen E. Barrow	1914–1979	1962–1979	1962–1979	—	Kennedy	death
9	H. Dale Cook	1924–2008	1974–1992	1979–1992	1992–2008	Ford	death
10	Thomas Rutherford Brett	1931–2021	1979–1996	1994–1996	1996–2003	Carter	retirement
11	James O. Ellison	1929–2014	1979–1994	1992–1994	1994–2014	Carter	death
12	David Lynn Russell	1942–present	1981–1990	—	—	Reagan	reassignment
14	Michael Burrage	1950–present	1994–2001	—	—	Clinton	resignation
15	Sven Erik Holmes	1951–present	1994–2005	2003–2005	—	Clinton	resignation
17	James H. Payne	1941–2025	2001–2017	—	2017–2025	G.W. Bush	death

== Chief judges ==
Chief judges have administrative responsibilities with respect to their district court. Unlike the Supreme Court, where one justice is specifically nominated to be chief, the office of chief judge rotates among the district court judges. To be chief, a judge must have been in active service on the court for at least one year, be under the age of 65, and have not previously served as chief judge.

A vacancy is filled by the judge highest in seniority among the group of qualified judges. The chief judge serves for a term of seven years, or until age 70, whichever occurs first. The age restrictions are waived if no members of the court would otherwise be qualified for the position.

When the office was created in 1948, the chief judge was the longest-serving judge who had not elected to retire, on what has since 1958 been known as senior status, or declined to serve as chief judge. After August 6, 1959, judges could not become or remain chief after turning 70 years old. The current rules have been in operation since October 1, 1982.

== Succession of seats ==
Seat 1
Seat reassigned from Eastern District on February 16, 1925 by 43 Stat. 945
Kennamer	1925–1940
Savage	1940–1961
Barrow	1962–1979
Ellison	1979–1994
Holmes	1994–2005
Frizzell	2007–2025
vacant	2025–present

Seat 2
Seat established on June 22, 1936 by 49 Stat. 1804 (concurrent with Eastern and Western Districts)
Murrah	1937–1940
Broaddus	1940–1949
Wallace	1950–1960
Bohanon	1961–1974
Cook	1974–1992
Burrage	1994–2001
Payne	2001–2017
Heil III	2020–present

Seat 3
Seat established on May 19, 1961 by 75 Stat. 80 (concurrent with Eastern and Western Districts)
Daugherty	1961–1982
D. Russell	1981–1990
Seat reassigned solely to Western District on December 1, 1990 by 104 Stat. 5089

Seat 4
Seat established on October 20, 1978 by 92 Stat. 1629
Brett	1979–1996
Eagan	2001–2022
Hill	2024–present

Seat 5
Seat established on December 1, 1990 by 104 Stat. 5089
Kern	1994–2010
Dowdell	2012–2021
J. Russell	2024–present

== See also ==
- Courts of Oklahoma
- List of current United States district judges
- List of United States federal courthouses in Oklahoma
