= Seaborn Kennamer =

American politician

Seaborn F. Kennamer (April 1830 – 1915) was a state legislator in Alabama. He was born in Kennamer Cove. He had 9 children. He served in the legislature in 1869 and 1870 representing Marshall County, Alabama and later served as postmaster of Kennamer Cove. He married Bettie Mitchell from Tennessee in 1869 and farmed Winesap apples.

Samuel F. Kennamer was a delegate to the 1868 Alabama Constitutional Convention representing Marshall County. A family history was published and includes a photo of Seaborn.

He opposed slavery and secession. During the American Civil War he enlisted in the Union Army. and served in John B. Kennamer's (1820–1885) Company of Union Scouts and Guides. There were 33 men in the company which also included Jacob B. Kennamer. He became president of the local Union League. He was a delegate at the 1867 Alabama Constitutional Convention. He was baptized into the Church of Christ and was a religious leader.

His son Franklin Elmore Kennamer became an Oklahoma Supreme Court and U.S. District Court judge. He was preceded in death by his wife and retired to Gunterville, Alabama. Seaborn is buried along with his wife at Pisgah Cemetery in Kennamer Cove. Many family members moved west after the Civil War. A family reunion is held annually at Kennamer Cove.

== See also ==
- 1st Alabama Cavalry Regiment (Union)
- List of Alabama Union Civil War units
