= Thomas Rutherford Brett =

American judge (1931–2021)

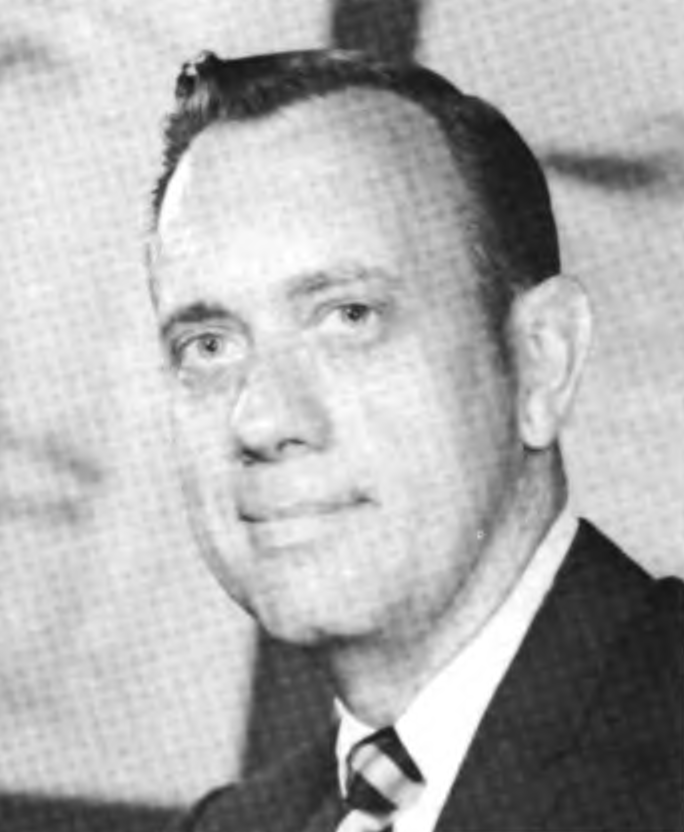

Senior Judge of the United States District Court for the Northern District of Oklahoma
- In office October 3, 1996 – February 1, 2003

Chief Judge of the United States District Court for the Northern District of Oklahoma
- In office 1994–1996
- Preceded by: James O. Ellison
- Succeeded by: Terence C. Kern

Judge of the United States District Court for the Northern District of Oklahoma
- In office November 2, 1979 – October 3, 1996
- Appointed by: Jimmy Carter
- Preceded by: Seat established by 92 Stat. 1629
- Succeeded by: Claire Eagan

Personal details
- Born: October 2, 1931 Oklahoma City, Oklahoma, U.S.
- Died: February 6, 2021 (aged 89) Tulsa, Oklahoma, U.S.
- Education: University of Oklahoma (BBA); University of Oklahoma College of Law (LLB, JD)

Military service
- Allegiance: United States of America
- Branch/service: United States Army; United States Army Judge Advocate General's Corps
- Years of service: 1954-1955; 1955-1981
- Rank: Colonel

Thomas Rutherford Brett (October 2, 1931 – February 6, 2021) was a United States district judge of the United States District Court for the Northern District of Oklahoma.

== Education and career ==
Born in Oklahoma City, Oklahoma, Brett received a Bachelor of Business Administration from the University of Oklahoma in 1952, a Bachelor of Laws from the University of Oklahoma College of Law in 1957, and a Juris Doctor from the same institution in 1971. He was a lieutenant in the United States Army from 1954 to 1955, and was thereafter a reserve colonel in the United States Army JAG Corps until 1981. He was an assistant county attorney in Tulsa, Oklahoma from 1957 to 1958, and was then in private practice in Tulsa until 1979.

== Federal judicial service ==
On September 28, 1979, Brett was nominated by President Jimmy Carter to a new seat on the United States District Court for the Northern District of Oklahoma created by 92 Stat. 1629. He was confirmed by the United States Senate on October 31, 1979, and received his commission on November 2, 1979. He served as Chief Judge from 1994 to 1996, assuming senior status on October 3, 1996. Brett served in that capacity until his retirement on February 1, 2003.

== Death ==
Brett died on February 6, 2021, at age 89, in Tulsa, Oklahoma.

== Sources ==
Legal offices
Preceded by Seat established by 92 Stat. 1629	Judge of the United States District Court for the Northern District of Oklahoma; 1979–1996	Succeeded by Claire Eagan
Preceded by James O. Ellison	Chief Judge of the United States District Court for the Northern District of Oklahoma; 1994–1996	Succeeded by Terence C. Kern
