= Charles Barnes Goodwin =

American judge (born 1970)

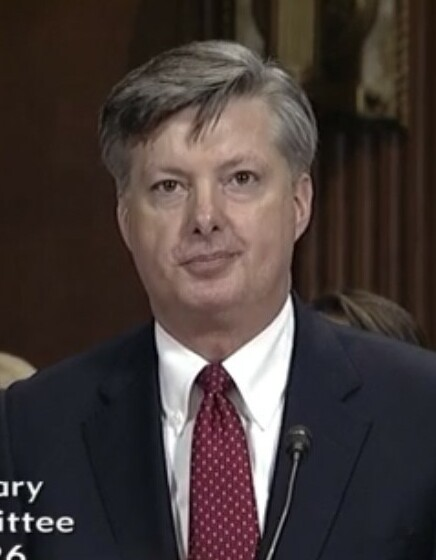
- Goodwin in 2017

Judge of the United States District Court for the Western District of Oklahoma
- Incumbent
- Assumed office August 30, 2018
- Appointed by: Donald Trump
- Preceded by: Robin J. Cauthron

Magistrate Judge of the United States District Court for the Western District of Oklahoma
- In office August 31, 2013 – August 30, 2018

Personal details
- Born: 1970 (age 55–56) Clinton, Oklahoma, U.S.
- Education: University of Oklahoma (BA, JD)

Charles Barnes Goodwin (born 1970) is a United States district judge of the United States District Court for the Western District of Oklahoma. He was formerly a United States magistrate judge of the same court.

== Biography ==
Charles Barnes Goodwin was born in Clinton, Oklahoma, in 1970 to Charles L. "Buzz" and Nancy Goodwin. His father served as Mayor of Clinton before becoming an Oklahoma state District Judge. He received his Bachelor of Arts from the University of Oklahoma and his Juris Doctor from the University of Oklahoma College of Law, where he served on the Oklahoma Law Review. Goodwin then served as a law clerk to then-Magistrate Judge Claire Eagan of the United States District Court for the Northern District of Oklahoma and to Judges Lee Roy West and Vicki Miles-LaGrange of the United States District Court for the Western District of Oklahoma. Before becoming a magistrate judge, he was a partner and civil litigator at Crowe & Dunlevy, P.C.

== Federal judicial service ==
Goodwin was appointed to become a United States magistrate judge of the United States District Court for the Western District of Oklahoma on August 31, 2013. As a federal magistrate judge, he presided over approximately 500 initial proceedings in felony cases, issued approximately 350 opinions in civil cases, and disposed of over 1,000 misdemeanor cases. His service as a magistrate judge terminated when he became a district judge.

On July 13, 2017, President Donald Trump nominated Goodwin to serve as a United States district judge of the United States District Court for the Western District of Oklahoma, to the seat vacated by Judge Robin J. Cauthron, who assumed senior status on July 14, 2015. In October 2017, Goodwin received a rating of "not qualified" from the American Bar Association (ABA). The ABA did not provide an explanation for its rating at the time. On December 13, 2017, a hearing on his nomination was held before the Senate Judiciary Committee. In a letter to the Judiciary Committee, the American Bar Association (ABA) stated that it had no objection to Goodwin's "judicial temperament, intellectual capacity, writing and analytical abilities, knowledge of the law, or breadth of professional experience". However, the ABA questioned his work habits, stating that he often did not show up in court until the late afternoon and questioning his ability to administer justice efficiently. Testifying before the committee, Goodwin stated that he often worked remotely from a home office when he did not have court hearings.

On January 3, 2018, his nomination was returned to the President under Rule XXXI, Paragraph 6 of the United States Senate. On January 5, 2018, President Donald Trump announced his intent to renominate Goodwin to a federal judgeship. On January 8, 2018, his renomination was sent to the Senate. On January 18, 2018, his nomination was reported out of committee by a 15–6 vote. On August 28, 2018, the Senate confirmed his nomination by a 52–42 vote. He received his judicial commission on August 30, 2018.

=== Notable rulings ===
On December 1, 2020, he referred to the Interstate Commerce Commission Termination Act when he declared unconstitutional a 2019 State of Oklahoma law preventing trains from blocking streets for longer than 10 minutes; declaring, in part:

. . . a state or local government can address grade-level railroad crossing issues in a manner that does not run afoul of federal law . . . But a statute that tells railroad companies how long they may stop their trains — for whatever ends — intrudes on the territory reserved to the ICCTA.

Legal offices
Preceded by Robin J. Cauthron	Judge of the United States District Court for the Western District of Oklahoma; 2018–present	Incumbent
