= Bishop McGuinness Catholic High School (Oklahoma) =

Location
- 801 Northwest 50th Street; Oklahoma City, Oklahoma 73118; United States; 35°31′23″N 97°31′34″W

Information
- Type: Private, Coeducational
- Motto: Fides et Scientia (Faith and Knowledge)
- Religious affiliation: Roman Catholic
- Established: 1950
- Founder: Catholic Archdiocese of Oklahoma
- President: Msgr. Richard Stansberry
- Principal: Andrew Worthington
- Grades: 9–12
- Colors: Kelly Green and White
- Mascot: Clancy
- Nickname: The Fighting Irish
- Accreditation: North Central Association of Colleges and Schools
- Newspaper: Chi Rhoan
- Website: www.bmchs.org

Bishop McGuinness Catholic High School (McGuinness) is a college-preparatory secondary school located in Oklahoma City, Oklahoma, United States. It has an enrollment of 720 students in grades 9 through 12, is co-educational, and serves as part of the Archdiocese of Oklahoma City in the Roman Catholic Church.

== History ==
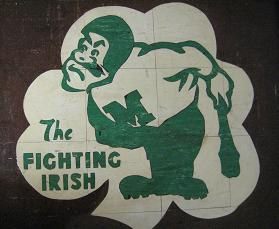
"Clancy" mascot image from the floor of the old McGuinness building

The school was founded in 1950 by the archdiocese as “Central Catholic High School.” Despite the name, the school was on the northern fringe of Oklahoma City at the time. The name "Central" referred to the fact that the school was founded as a replacement for multiple small parish-based parochial high schools that had become outdated by the 1950s. As a result, then-bishop Eugene J. McGuinness ordered parochial high schools in the Oklahoma City area closed and consolidated into the new school (the only exception being Mount Saint Mary High School in south Oklahoma City). The school colors (Kelly Green and White) were adopted in 1951, with the school mascot (“Clancy”) and the nickname (“Fighting Irish”) following in 1955.

In 1959, the school was renamed in honor of McGuinness, who had died in 1957.

In 1960, the school received full accreditation from the North Central Association of Colleges and Schools and the Oklahoma Department of Education. The school is also affiliated with the National Catholic Educational Association, the College Board, and the National Association of Secondary School Principals.

The Class of 1962 provided the school with its primary tradition when it donated a rendition of the "Clancy" mascot on the tile floor of the school. From 1962 to the school's renovation in 2006, the tradition dictated that each year's senior class protect the image from being trod upon by any student. After the renovation, the tile image was moved to a special display.

== Campus ==
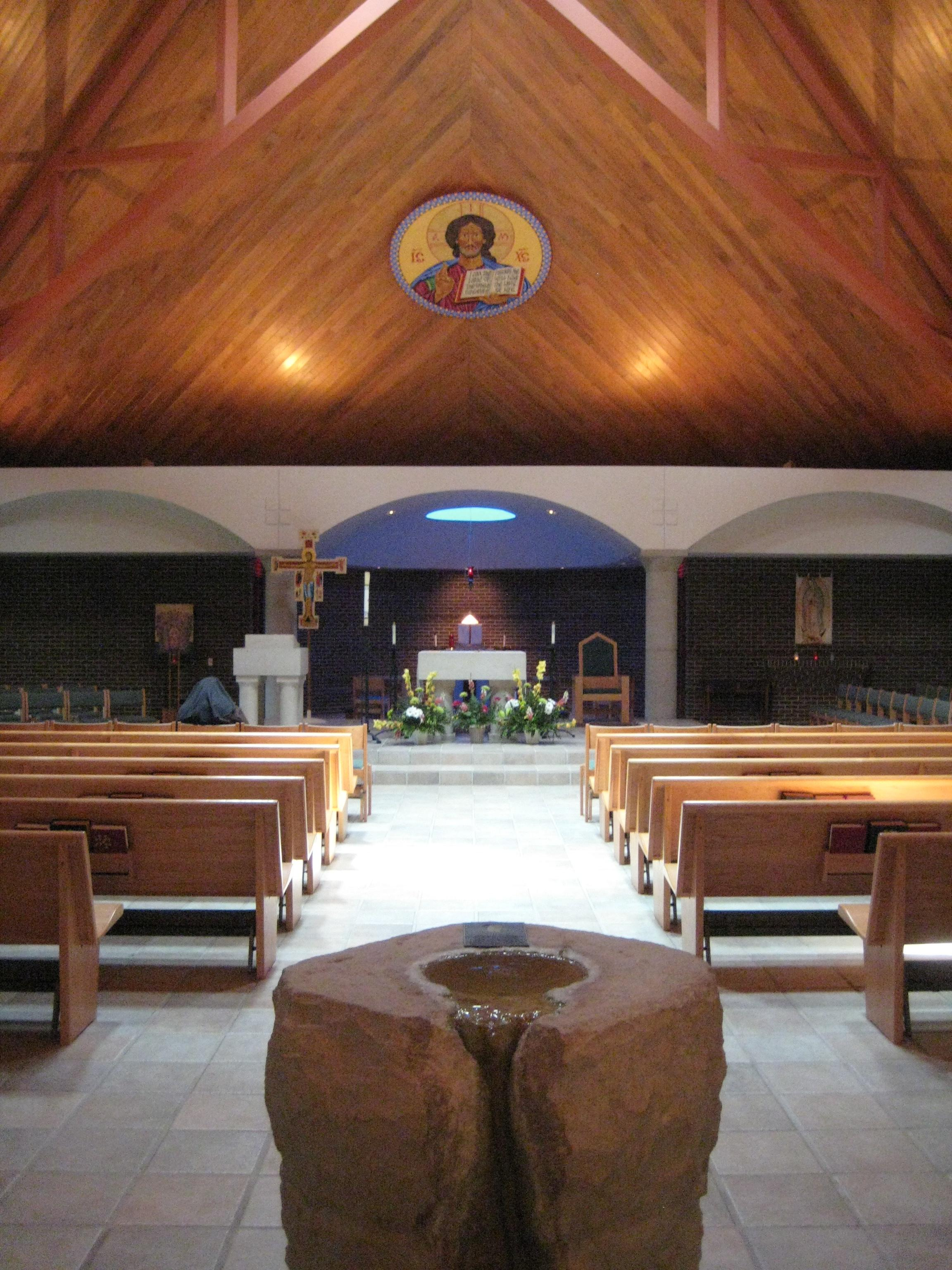
Frassati Chapel

The school's campus has been located at the intersection of 50th Street and Western Avenue in Oklahoma City since its founding. The main academic building was completed in 1950, with a gymnasium and football stadium following in 1951. Improvements since that time have included the creation of a track and field complex in 1987, a new theology and art center wing in 1991, the Blessed Pier Giorgio Frassati Chapel in 1998, and the renovation of the main auditorium into the Father John Petuskey Performing Arts Auditorium in 2002.

In 2006, after a three-year, $9.5 million capital campaign, the school opened the David L. Morton Educational Facility, named after the current Principal, a building which substantially replaced the prior main academic building. The facility includes new classrooms, offices, a student commons area, and a new academic information center named in honor of Father Stanley Rother.

In 2008 the school opened the refurbished McCarthy Gymnasium, including updated facilities for the basketball, wrestling, and volleyball programs. That year, the school also unveiled a refurbishment of its football complex, including new weight training facilities, football offices, and a new facade to Pribil Stadium.

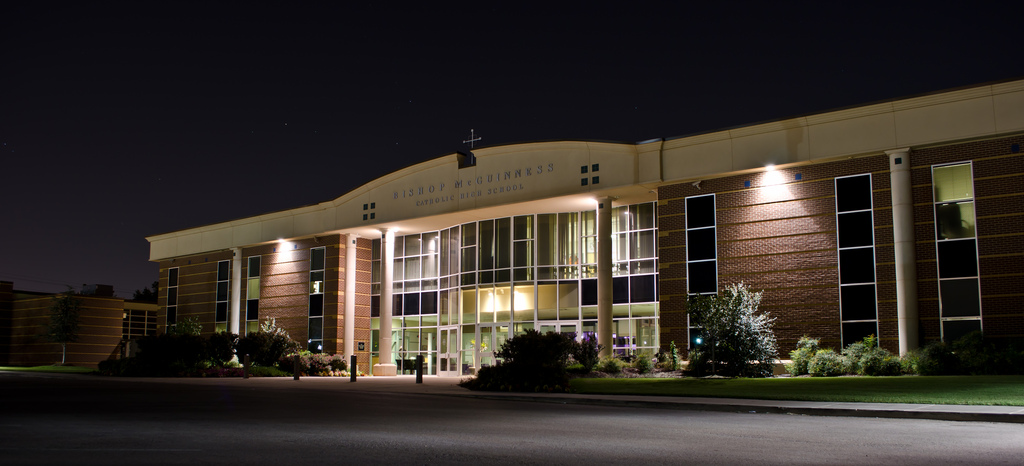
Bishop McGuinness Catholic High School

In 2012, the School added on an addition to their Senior Hall, being the new Lecture Hall. This new Lecture hall also includes 5 new classrooms now known as the Math Wing of the school. The Lecture Hall also provides students with larger class sizes to allow students to experience a college setting.

== Academics ==
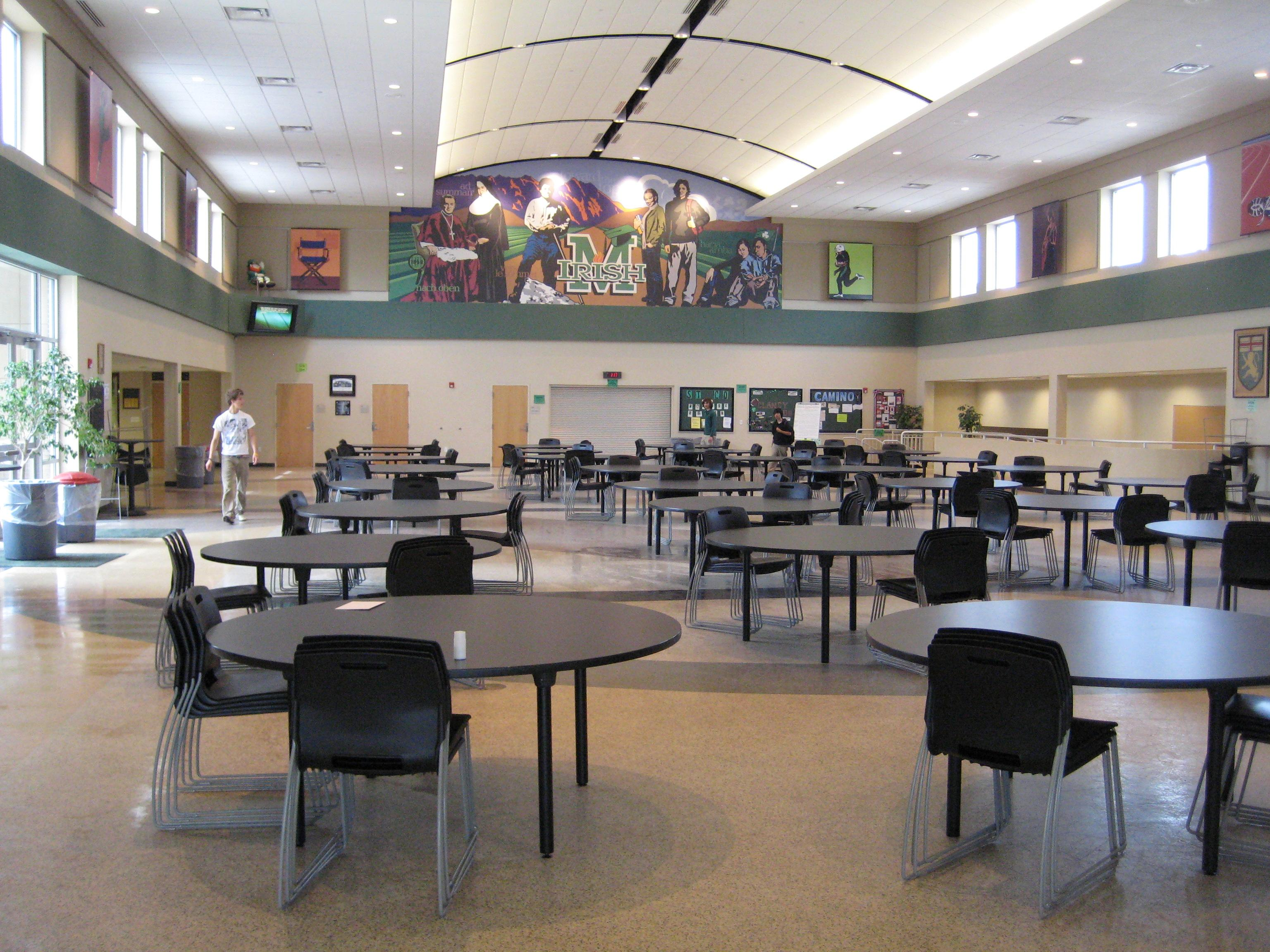
McGuinness Main Building Interior

The school is one of the more rigorous college-preparatory schools in Oklahoma. Ninety-nine percent of its student body goes on to college. As of 2018, the school offers Advanced Placement courses in 21 subject areas.

In 2004, McGuinness was recognized in the first annual Catholic High School Honor Roll as one of the Top 50 Catholic High Schools in the United States. In that year, the school was also noted as a Top-20 school in the subcategory of "Civic Education." This Top-50 distinction was repeated in 2005, 2006 (with a Top-25 Civic Education ranking), and again in 2007. In 2010, the school received Honorable Mention as one of six schools in the "Academics" subcategory.

Extra-curricular academic opportunities include a student newspaper, the Chi Rhoan, which publishes every other month and received the “All Oklahoma Award” at Oklahoma Scholastic Media's 93rd annual competition in 2009, in addition to other more recent awards. The school's Academic Team won the OSSAA Academic Bowl Class 3A State Championship in both 1999 and 2000, and the Class 5A State Championship in 2022 and 2023. Other teams have won six state titles in Speech & Debate, and five in One-Act Play.

== Athletics ==
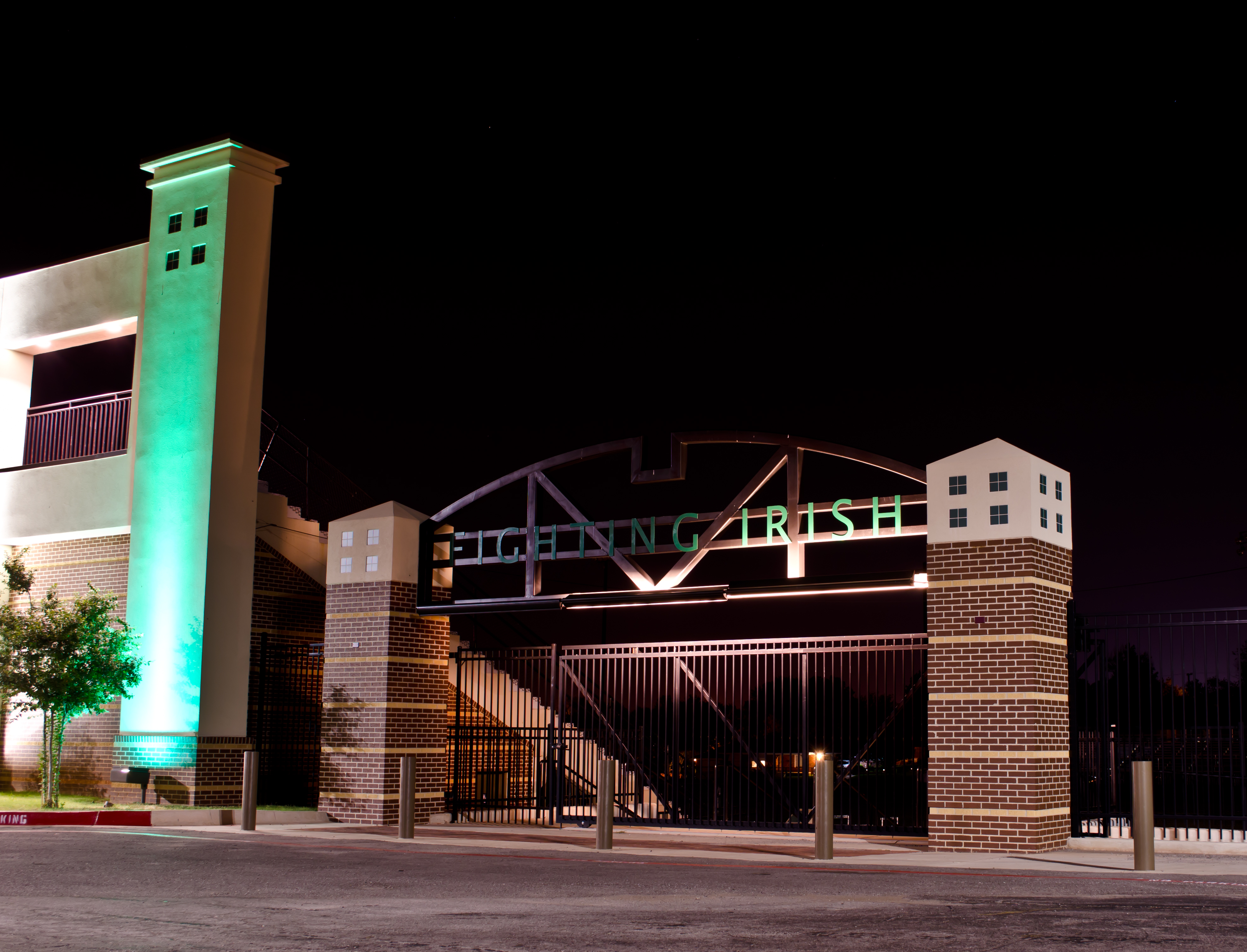
The gates at Pribil Stadium

Athletics have been a part of McGuinness's tradition since its inception. After initially competing in Catholic school leagues within the state, McGuinness was first accepted to the major state athletic regulatory body—the Oklahoma Secondary School Activities Association (OSSAA)—in 1966, allowing it to officially compete against public secondary schools. As of 2025, McGuinness has won 99 OSSAA state athletic titles in its classification across eighteen sports. Sports Illustrated rated McGuinness #11 on its national Top 25 High School Athletic Programs list for the 2007–08 school year.

The Bishop McGuinness Boys Basketball Tournament, founded in 1961, is a fixture of the winter schedule and is the oldest interscholastic high school basketball tournament in the state.

In football, McGuinness shares a tradition with cross-state rival Bishop Kelley High School, which together form the two largest private schools in the state. The winner of the contest obtains possession of the "Shillelagh Trophy" for the upcoming year. The schools also compete biannually in boys' and girls' basketball.

Outside of the OSSAA, the school's Dance/Pom team participates in competitions sponsored by the Oklahoma State Dance Team Directors Association, and has won multiple titles.

=== Classification dispute ===
McGuinness competes by default in Class 4A athletics within the OSSAA. A 2011 OSSAA classification change—which mandated that private schools be elevated in class after finishing in the top eight of any given sport in two of the three preceding years—was disputed by the school in 2014, and a lawsuit was filed by McGuinness. A compromise solution was reached in 2015. In 2023, after the Oklahoma Attorney General prevented the OSSAA from creating a separate postseason playoff bracket for private schools, further OSSAA rule changes affecting private schools led to another lawsuit by a consortium of five Oklahoma private schools, including Bishop McGuinness Catholic High School. In April 2024, the court voided the OSSAA's rule changes, so that the highest classification in which McGuinness competes athletically is now Class 5A.

=== Championships ===
McGuinness OSSAA Athletic Championships		
SPORT	TITLES	YEAR(S)
Baseball	2	2002, 2008
Boys' Basketball	9	1989, 1998, 1999, 2000, 2001, 2006, 2007, 2008, 2012
Girls' Basketball	1	2011
Cheerleading	5	2017, 2018, 2019, 2021, 2024
Cheerleading (Game Day)	7	2019, 2021, 2022, 2022, 2024, 2025, 2025
Boys' Cross Country	10	1984, 1992, 1993, 1995, 1996, 1997, 1998, 1999, 2003, 2004
Girls' Cross Country	20	1987, 1988, 1990, 1992, 1993, 1994, 1995, 1996, 1997, 1998, 1999, 2000, 2001, 2002, 2004, 2005, 2006, 2007, 2008, 2016
Football	2	2006, 2007
Boys' Golf	2	2008, 2016
Girls' Golf	4	2007, 2010, 2011, 2024
Boys' Soccer	3	2003, 2007, 2026
Girls' Soccer	2	2008, 2022
Girls' Swimming and Diving	2	2009,2010
Boys' Tennis	4	2003, 2004, 2011, 2017
Girls' Tennis	13	1999, 2000, 2001, 2002, 2003, 2004, 2005, 2006, 2007, 2008; 2009, 2010, 2011
Boys' Track and Field	5	1997, 1998, 2000, 2006, 2007
Girls' Track and Field	8	1989, 1990, 1998, 1999, 2000, 2001, 2008, 2015
Girls' Volleyball	4	2003, 2023, 2025, 2026
Total	103	

== Notable alumni ==
- Blake Bailey, author best known for literary biographies, winner of 2009 National Book Critics Circle Award
- Janet Barresi, Former Oklahoma State Superintendent of Public Instruction
- Sanford Coats, former United States Attorney for the Western District of Oklahoma.
- Bernard M. Jones, a United States District Judge of the United States District Court for the Western District of Oklahoma and a former United States magistrate judge of the same court.
- David Dank, member of Oklahoma House of Representatives from 2007 until his death in 2015
- Dan Fagin, author and environmental journalist, winner of 2014 Pulitzer Prize for General Nonfiction
- Gabe Ikard, retired National Football League offensive lineman, former radio host on KRXO-FM and current podcaster.
- Vicki Miles-LaGrange, Chief U.S. District Judge for the Western District of Oklahoma.
- Daniel Orton, 2010 NBA Draft first-round selection to Orlando Magic.
- Lou Berney, Award winning American crime fiction author, Edgar Award winner
