= United States Attorney for the Western District of Oklahoma =

- First holder: John Embry

The United States attorney for the Western District of Oklahoma is the chief federal law enforcement officer in forty Oklahoma counties. The U.S. District Court for the Western District of Oklahoma has jurisdiction over all cases prosecuted by the U.S. attorney. Sanford Coats, who was appointed by Barack Obama in 2009 was the U.S. attorney for the District until 2016.

== Jurisdiction ==
Alfalfa, Beaver, Beckham, Blaine, Caddo, Canadian, Cimarron, Cleveland, Comanche, Cotton, Custer, Dewey, Ellis, Garfield, Garvin, Grady, Grant, Greer, Harmon, Harper, Jackson, Jefferson, Kay, Kingfisher, Kiowa, Lincoln, Logan, McClain, Major, Noble, Oklahoma, Payne, Pottawatomie, Roger Mills, Stephens, Texas, Tillman, Washita, Woods, and Woodward. The court sits at Chickasha, Enid, Guthrie, Lawton, Mangum, Oklahoma City, Pauls Valley, Ponca City, Shawnee, and Woodward.

== Organization ==
The office is organized into divisions handling criminal and civil matters.

== List of U.S. attorneys for the Western District of Oklahoma ==
- John Embry: 1907–1912
- Isaac Taylor: 1912
- Homer Boardman: 1912–1913
- Isaac Taylor: 1913–1914
- John Fain: 1914–1920
- Frank Randell: 1920
- Robert Peck: 1920–1921
- William Maurer: 1921–1925
- Roy St. Lewis: 1925–1931
- Herbert Hyde: 1931–1934
- William Lewis: 1934–1938
- Charles Dierker: 1938–1947
- Robert Shelton: 1947–1953
- Fred Mock: 1953–1954
- Paul Cress: 1954–1961
- Andrew Potter: 1961–1969
- Bill Burkett: 1969–1975
- David Lynn Russell: 1975–1977
- John Green: 1977–1978
- Larry Patton: 1978–1981
- David Lynn Russell: 1981–1982
- John Green: 1982
- Bill Price: 1982–1989
- Robert Mydans: 1989
- Timothy D. Leonard: 1989–1992
- John Green: 1993
- Vicki Miles-LaGrange: 1993–1994
- Rozia McKinney-Foster: 1994–1995
- Patrick Ryan: 1995–1999
- Daniel Webber: 1999–2001
- Robert McCampbell: 2001–2005
- John Richter: 2005–2009
- Robert Troester: 2009
- Sanford Coats: 2009–2016
- Mark A. Yancey: 2016–2019 (acting)
- Timothy J. Downing:2019-2021
