= Stanley Alexander =

Stanley Alexander may refer to:

- Stan Alexander (1905–1961), English footballer
- Stanley W. Alexander, member of the Oklahoma House of Representatives
- S. W. Alexander (Stanley Walter Alexander, 1895–1980), British journalist and political activist
