= Charles Page High School =

Coordinates: 36.143985°N 96.103041°W

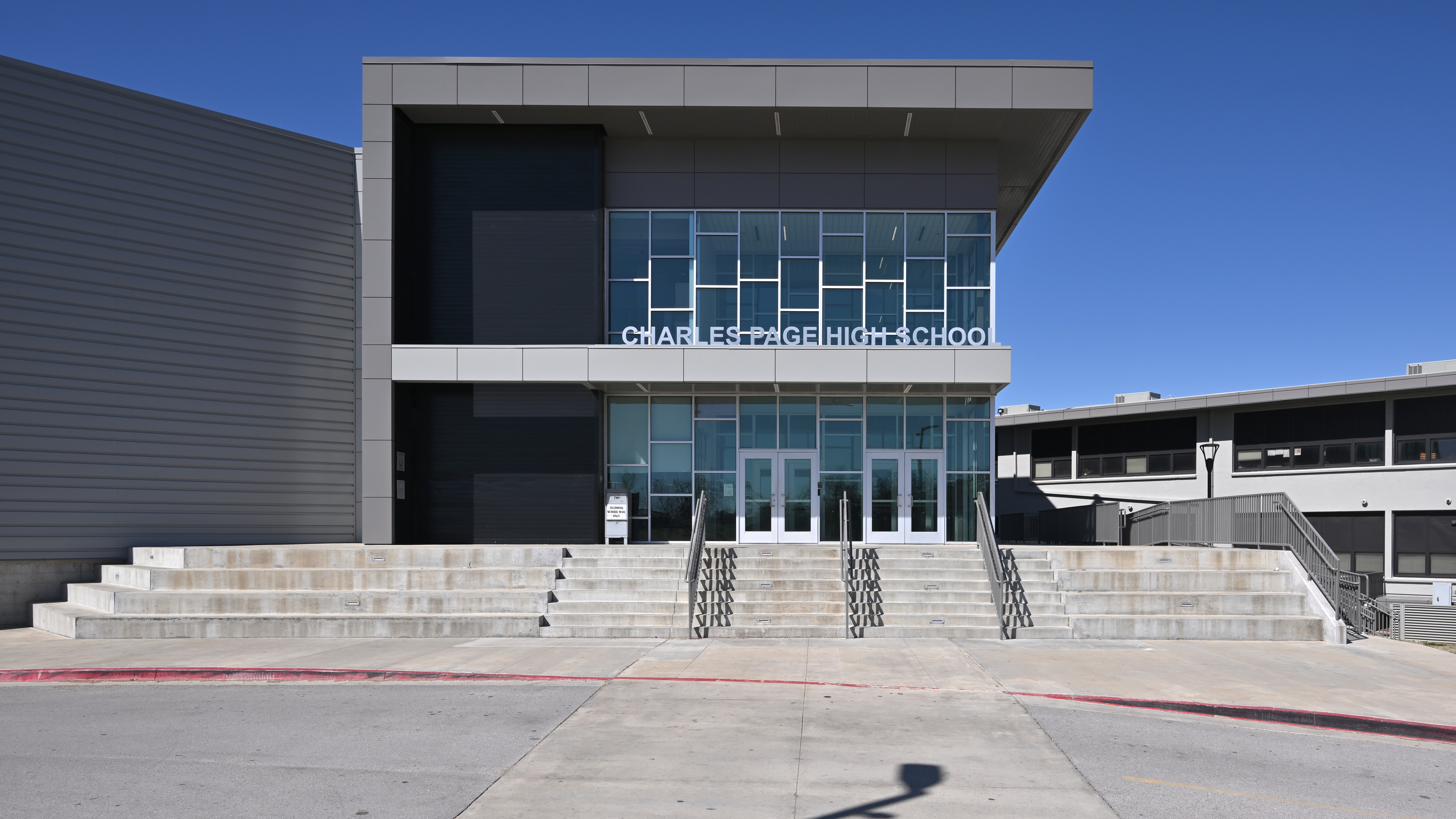
- 500 North Adams Road; Sand Springs, Oklahoma 74063; United States

Information
- Type: Public high school
- Motto: "Character, Pride, Honor, Scholarship"
- Established: 1959
- Principal: Ryan Bivin
- Teaching staff: 82.85 (FTE)
- Grades: 9-12
- Enrollment: 1,771 (2023–2024)
- Student to teacher ratio: 21.38
- Colors: Black and gold
- Mascot: Minuteman
- Nickname: Sandites
- Newspaper: Sandtonian
- Yearbook: Sandite
- Website: Charles Page High Sandites

Charles Page High School is a high school in Sand Springs, Oklahoma, United States, named after the philanthropist Charles Page. It is the only public high school in Sand Springs.

== History ==
Charles Page High School was built in 1959, constructed to replace Sand Springs High School, which is now the former Central Ninth Grade Center/Virtual Center.

On August 21, 1964, five black students were refused enrollment at Charles Page which was at that time an all-white high school.

In March 2019, voters passed a general obligation bond measure to fund a new Ninth Grade Center add-on at the CPHS campus. It replaced the former Central Ninth Grade Center in downtown Sand Springs. The building of the Charles Page High School Freshman Academy was completed in the summertime before the schools first semester that year.

=== Gay-Straight Alliance controversy ===
In 2004, Charles Page High School garnered national attention with a controversy surrounding the creation of a Gay-Straight Alliance at the school. An openly gay student, Michael Shackelford, was the focus of a series of articles in The Washington Post which brought national attention to the school. This national attention caught the eye of radical preacher Fred Phelps of Topeka, Kansas Westboro Baptist Church who came and protested at Charles Page in November 2004. However, the alliance was briefly dismantled after those students graduated. It has since been reformed, but was renamed to “Gender-Sexuality Alliance” years later.

== Extra-curricular activities ==
Clubs include the African American Student Union (AASU), Native American Student Association (NASA), Anchor Club, French Club, Spanish Club, Chinese Club, Key Club, YMCA Youth and Government, Student Council, Gold Pride Marching Band, Jazz Band, Academic Team, Family Career Community Leaders of America, Future Farmers of America, Concert Choir and Advanced/Stage Choir, applied music in Piano, Beginner's Guitar, Advanced Guitar, Music Appreciation, Music Theory, Debate, Competitive Speech, BITI, Business Professionals of America, National Honor Society, Drama, Stagecraft, Art, Pottery, Creative Writing, Gender Sexuality Alliance, The Sandite (yearbook committee), and The Sandtonian, an online newspaper that had formerly run for over 100 years in its nondigital form prior to the launch of the website. Additionally, there is a Bible Study at Charles Page, but it is not an official club.

== Athletics ==
The school mascot is the Minuteman.

Athletic Teams at Charles Page High School
| Sport | Level | Season | Gender |
|---|---|---|---|
| Track and Field | V, JV | Fall, Winter, Spring | Girls', Boys' |
| Baseball | V, JV | Spring | Boys' |
| Tennis | V, JV | Spring | Boys', Girls' |
| Golf | V | Spring | Boys', Girls' |
| Fast Pitch Softball | V, JV | Fall | Girls' |
| Slow Pitch Softball | V | Spring | Girls' |
| Football | V, JV, F | Fall | Boys' |
| Cheerleading | V | Fall, Winter | Girls' |
| Soccer | V, JV (Boys' only) | Fall | Boys', Girls' |
| Volleyball | V, JV, F | Fall | Girls' |
| Cross-Country | V | Fall | Co-ed |
| Basketball | V, JV, F | Winter | Boys', Girls' |
| Bowling | V, JV | Winter | Boys', Girls' |
| Esports | V | | |
| Pom | V | | Girls' |
| Swimming | V | | Boys', Girls' |
| Wrestling | V, JV | | Boys', Girls' |

V = Varsity, JV = Junior Varsity, F = Freshman

=== State championships ===
- 1966: Football-Class 3A
- 1971: Wrestling 4A
- 1994: Girls' Basketball-Class 6A
- 2012: Wrestling- 6A Academic
- 2015: 9th Grade/JV Cheerleading, 8th Grade Cheerleading
- 2017: Wrestling Dual and Team-Class 6A
- 2025: Football-Class 6AII

=== Football history ===
Charles Prigmore was the first head coach at Charles Page High School.

Travis Rhodes took up the reins from 1961 to 1962 and led Charles Page to an undefeated season in 1962, but they were unable to compete in the playoffs because they weren't in an eligible conference.

Frank Tillery coached from 1964 to 1966 and in 1966 led them to their first and only state title in Class 2A. Quarterback Jackie Hill took them 12-0 and also landed a district title. On October 21, they upset the #1 ranked Broken Arrow and earned the #1 spot for themselves. They settled their 1951 score against Ada with a 37–26 win, then confronted El Reno in the final round. The game was played at Taft Stadium in Oklahoma City on an icy field in December. It was so cold that day that the cheerleaders and fans were burning fires in trashcans for warmth. At one point, football player Arlie Christmas accidentally set his leg on fire, briefly, without injury. David Treadwell, however, was not without injury and left the game with a broken arm. The Sandites won the game 14–7. A road through the Charles Page campus was named after Frank Tillery.

AD James (1976-1979) gave Charles Page her first back to back district titles in 76 and 77.

Page's longest tenured coach is LD Bains who coached from 1983 to 1996. In 1987, the Sandites shared a district title with Stillwater and Bartlesville and ended 10-3 after defeating Memorial and Norman in the playoffs before falling 14–10 to Lawton in the third round. The took another run at the championship in 1990 and entered the playoffs 7-3 after an impressive season including three shutouts, one of which was against sixth-ranked Stillwater. They defeated #10 Union and #9 Jenks before falling to Putnam North in the third round of the playoffs, finishing the season ranked fifth. The Sandites made four more playoff appearances under Bains but never made it past the first round.

In 1997, LD Bains retired and Archie Loehr took over, leading the Sandites to a perfect regular season with a district title, a victory over #2 Stillwater, and three shutouts. They scored playoff wins against #7 Broken Arrow and #11 Sapulpa before falling 10–7 against Yukon, their only defeat of the season.

The Sandites then entered a dark spell, going 3-7 under Mark Baetz in 2001, then 0-10 two consecutive seasons under Tim Beacham. In 2004, head coach Brad Odom broke the 28th game losing streak with a 58–6 win over Central.

The Sandites posted four consecutive 4–6 seasons from 2004 to 2007.

In 2007, Dustin Kinard became the head coach. 2007 was also the first season in the newly remodeled Memorial Stadium. Sophomore Quarterback Johnny Deaton was covered as one of the top QBs in the state, despite the team only going 4–6. The Sandites had their highest scoring season of all time, averaging 35.81 points per game under Deaton, but a terrible defense that allowed 36 points per game negated any real chance the team had at a state title. In 2008 the team had a 7-4 record and went to the playoffs. In 2009 Deaton broke his collarbone in the opening game and missed half the season. That and a game that was won on the field but forfeited due to an ineligible player led to a 4–6 season. The team went back to the playoffs in 2012 and 2013.

In 2014 the OSSAA split class 6A into two divisions, each with their own playoffs and state title. The Sandites fell into the smaller, new, Class 6A-II. That year the team went 8-4, winning their first playoff game since 1997. In 2015 they went 7-5 and made their first State Championship appearance since 1966 but lost to Bixby. In 2016 they went 7-5 once again, won another playoff game, and fell to Bixby in the semifinals. 2017 saw another playoff appearance, but they lost in the first round.

In 2019 head coach Dustin Kinard was fired. Before being dismissed he was the second-longest tenured coach in town history, and the second-longest tenured coach in Class 6A.

Bobby Klinck became the headcoach in 2020.

== Athletic complex ==
Charles Page High School has an extensive athletic complex that includes tennis courts, an indoor basketball arena, a baseball field, a football stadium, and one and a half football practice fields.

At the end of the 2006 football season, Charles Page's football stadium, Memorial Stadium, was demolished. Construction of the new Memorial Stadium started in the early winter of 2007. The field itself and bleachers were completed for the start of the 2007 football season, while the stadium facilities such as restrooms, locker rooms, and concession stands were completed midseason. The original stadium was built in 1948–1949 to replace the older Dubie Field that was located at 2nd and Washington in Sand Springs.

On October 13, 2009, Sand Springs citizens passed a bond issue that will provide renovations to the current Ed Dubie fieldhouse as well as various other projects such as a new fine arts facility and the demolition of the pool for the eventual converting into a new wrestling facility.

On March 15, 2019, Sand Springs citizens passed a bond measure that will provide for the re-grading of the Sandite Softball and Baseball fields, as well new turf at Memorial Stadium and sound system upgrades at the Ed Dubie Field House.

== Notable alumni ==
- Daton Fix, World Wrestling level wrestler
- Sam Harris, singer
- Marques Haynes, professional basketball player (Note: Marques Haynes actually graduated from Booker T. Washington High School in Sand Springs. However, CPHS is the successor school after the integration of African-American students into the Sand Springs School System. Likewise, William R. Pogue, Jerry Adair, and Mae Young graduated from Sand Springs High School, which was replaced by CPHS in 1959.)
- William R. Pogue, astronaut
- Jerry Adair, professional baseball player
- Mae Young, professional wrestler
- Brett Sinkbeil, professional baseball player
- Michael Bowie, professional football player
- Scott L. Palk, U.S. District Judge for the United States District Court for the Western District of Oklahoma
