= Robin J. Cauthron =

American judge (born 1950)

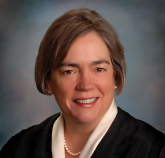

Senior Judge of the United States District Court for the Western District of Oklahoma
- Incumbent
- Assumed office July 14, 2015

Chief Judge of the United States District Court for the Western District of Oklahoma
- In office 2001–2008
- Preceded by: David Lynn Russell
- Succeeded by: Vicki Miles-LaGrange

Judge of the United States District Court for the Western District of Oklahoma
- In office March 25, 1991 – July 14, 2015
- Appointed by: George H. W. Bush
- Preceded by: Seat established by 104 Stat. 5089
- Succeeded by: Charles Barnes Goodwin

Magistrate Judge of the United States District Court for the Western District of Oklahoma
- In office 1986–1991

Personal details
- Born: Robin Louise Johnson; July 14, 1950 (age 75) Edmond, Oklahoma, U.S.
- Education: University of Oklahoma (BA, JD); Central State University, Oklahoma (MEd)

Robin Louise Johnson Cauthron (born July 14, 1950) is a senior United States district judge of the United States District Court for the Western District of Oklahoma.

== Biography ==
Born in Edmond, Oklahoma, Cauthron received a Bachelor of Arts from the University of Oklahoma in 1970, a Master of Education from Central State University, Oklahoma in 1974, and a Juris Doctor from the University of Oklahoma College of Law in 1977. She was a law clerk to Judge Ralph Gordon Thompson of the United States District Court for the Western District of Oklahoma from 1977 to 1981. She was a staff attorney of Legal Services of Eastern Oklahoma, Inc., in Hugo from 1981 to 1982. She was in private practice in Idabel from 1982 to 1983. She was a special district judge, Oklahoma District Court, 17th Judicial District from 1983 to 1986.

== Federal judicial service ==
Cauthron served as a United States magistrate judge for the Western District of Oklahoma from 1986 to 1991. On February 7, 1991, Cauthron was nominated by President George H. W. Bush to a new seat on the United States District Court for the Western District of Oklahoma created by 104 Stat. 5089. She was confirmed by the United States Senate on March 21, 1991, and received her commission on March 25, 1991. She served as Chief Judge from 2001 to 2008. She assumed senior status on July 14, 2015.

== Sources ==
Legal offices
Preceded by Seat established by 104 Stat. 5089	Judge of the United States District Court for the Western District of Oklahoma; 1991–2015	Succeeded by Charles Barnes Goodwin
Preceded by David Lynn Russell	Chief Judge of the United States District Court for the Western District of Oklahoma; 2001–2008	Succeeded by Vicki Miles-LaGrange
