= Ralph Gordon Thompson =

American judge

Senior Judge of the United States District Court for the Western District of Oklahoma
- In office December 16, 1999 – August 6, 2007

Chief Judge of the United States District Court for the Western District of Oklahoma
- In office 1986–1993
- Preceded by: Luther Boyd Eubanks
- Succeeded by: Lee Roy West

Judge of the United States District Court for the Western District of Oklahoma
- In office October 14, 1975 – December 16, 1999
- Appointed by: Gerald Ford
- Preceded by: Stephen Sanders Chandler Jr.
- Succeeded by: Joe L. Heaton

Minority leader of the Oklahoma House of Representatives
- In office 1966–1970
- Succeeded by: Charles Ford

Member of the Oklahoma House of Representatives from the 83rd district
- In office 1967–1971
- Preceded by: G. T. Blankenship
- Succeeded by: Kent Frates

Personal details
- Born: Ralph Gordon Thompson; December 15, 1934 (age 90); Oklahoma City, Oklahoma, U.S.
- Political party: Republican
- Education: University of Oklahoma (B.B.A.); University of Oklahoma College of Law (J.D.)

Ralph Gordon Thompson (born December 15, 1934) is a former United States district judge of the United States District Court for the Western District of Oklahoma.

== Education and career ==
Born in Oklahoma City, Oklahoma, Thompson received a Bachelor of Business Administration from the University of Oklahoma in 1956 and a Juris Doctor from the University of Oklahoma College of Law in 1961. He was a United States Air Force lieutenant from 1957 to 1960. He was a United States Air Force Reserve colonel from 1961 to 1987. He was in private practice in Oklahoma City from 1961 to 1975. He was a member of the Oklahoma House of Representatives from 1966 to 1970. He was assistant minority (Republican) leader from 1966 to 1970 and unsuccessfully ran for the office of Lieutenant Governor of Oklahoma in 1970, losing to incumbent George Nigh. While a Republican had been elected governor in 1962, the first election of a Republican lieutenant governor did not occur until 1994.

== Federal judicial service ==
Thompson was nominated by President Gerald Ford on September 24, 1975, to a seat on the United States District Court for the Western District of Oklahoma vacated by Judge Stephen Sanders Chandler Jr. He was confirmed by the United States Senate on October 9, 1975, and received his commission on October 14, 1975. He served as Chief Judge from 1986 to 1993. He served as a Judge of the United States Foreign Intelligence Surveillance Court from 1990 to 1997. He assumed senior status on December 16, 1999. Thompson served in that capacity until August 6, 2007, when he retired from his position making room for his successor and son-in-law, the newly appointed Judge Timothy DeGiusti. Federal law prohibits close relatives from serving concurrently on the Federal bench.

== Sources ==
Legal offices
Preceded by Stephen Sanders Chandler Jr.	Judge of the United States District Court for the Western District of Oklahoma; 1975–1999	Succeeded by Joe L. Heaton
Preceded by Luther Boyd Eubanks	Chief Judge of the United States District Court for the Western District of Oklahoma; 1986–1993	Succeeded by Lee Roy West
