= John C. Richter =

American politician

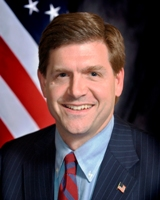

United States Attorney for the Western District of Oklahoma
- In office 2005 – August 2009
- Appointed by: George W. Bush
- Preceded by: Robert Garner McCampbell
- Succeeded by: Sanford Coats

John C. Richter was the United States Attorney for the Western District of Oklahoma from 2005 until August 2009. He was Chief of Staff for the Criminal Division of the Justice Department and was a strong supporter of the US Patriot Act. He has prosecuted Terrorism cases. He was an adjunct professor of law teaching criminal procedure at the University of Oklahoma during the fall semester of 2009.
