= David Lynn Russell =

American judge (born 1942)

Senior Judge of the United States District Court for the Western District of Oklahoma
- Incumbent
- Assumed office July 7, 2013

Chief Judge of the United States District Court for the Western District of Oklahoma
- In office 1994–2001
- Preceded by: Lee Roy West
- Succeeded by: Robin J. Cauthron

Judge of the United States District Court for the Eastern District of Oklahoma Judge of the United States District Court for the Northern District of Oklahoma
- In office December 17, 1981 – December 1, 1990
- Appointed by: Ronald Reagan
- Preceded by: Frederick Alvin Daugherty
- Succeeded by: Seat abolished

Judge of the United States District Court for the Western District of Oklahoma
- In office December 17, 1981 – July 7, 2013
- Appointed by: Ronald Reagan
- Preceded by: Frederick Alvin Daugherty
- Succeeded by: Patrick Wyrick

United States Attorney for the Western District of Oklahoma
- In office 1981–1982
- President: Ronald Reagan
- Preceded by: Larry Patton
- Succeeded by: John Green
- In office 1975–1977
- President: Gerald Ford
- Preceded by: Bill Burkett
- Succeeded by: John Green

Personal details
- Born: July 7, 1942 (age 83) Sapulpa, Oklahoma, U.S.
- Education: Oklahoma Baptist University (BS); University of Oklahoma (JD)

David Lynn Russell (born July 7, 1942) is a senior United States district judge of the United States District Court for the Western District of Oklahoma and a former United States district judge of the United States District Court for the Eastern District of Oklahoma and the United States District Court for the Northern District of Oklahoma. He served as the United States attorney for the Western District of Oklahoma from 1975 to 1977 and again from 1981 to 1982.

== Education and career ==
Russell was born in Sapulpa, Oklahoma. He received a Bachelor of Science degree from Oklahoma Baptist University in 1963 and a Juris Doctor from the University of Oklahoma College of Law in 1965. He was in the United States Navy, JAG Corps, from 1965 to 1968, continuing to serve as a reservist until 1971 and achieving the rank of lieutenant commander. He was an assistant attorney general of the State of Oklahoma from 1968 to 1969, and was then a legal advisor to Governor Dewey Bartlett from 1969 to 1971. He entered private practice in Oklahoma City from 1971 to 1972, but when Bartlett was elected to the United States Senate, Russell became his chief legislative assistant from 1972 to 1975. Russell was then the United States attorney for the Western District of Oklahoma from 1975 to 1977, returning to private practice in Oklahoma City from 1979 to 1981, but again serving in the United States attorney post from 1981 to 1982.

=== Federal judicial service ===
On December 4, 1981, Russell was nominated by President Ronald Reagan to a joint seat on the United States District Court for the Eastern District of Oklahoma, United States District Court for the Northern District of Oklahoma, and United States District Court for the Western District of Oklahoma, vacated by Judge Frederick Alvin Daugherty. Russell was confirmed by the United States Senate on December 16, 1981, and received his commission on December 17, 1981. On December 1, 1990, he was reassigned by operation of law to serve on only the Western District of Oklahoma, where he served as Chief Judge from 1994 to 2001. He assumed senior status on July 7, 2013.

== See also ==
- List of United States federal judges by longevity of service

== Sources ==
Legal offices
Preceded by Frederick Alvin Daugherty	Judge of the United States District Court for the Eastern District of Oklahoma; Judge of the United States District Court for the Northern District of Oklahoma; 1981–1990	Seat abolished
Preceded by Frederick Alvin Daugherty	Judge of the United States District Court for the Western District of Oklahoma; 1981–2013	Succeeded by Patrick Wyrick
Preceded by Lee Roy West	Chief Judge of the United States District Court for the Western District of Oklahoma; 1994–2001	Succeeded by Robin J. Cauthron
