= Stephen P. Friot =

American judge (born 1947)

Stephen Friot
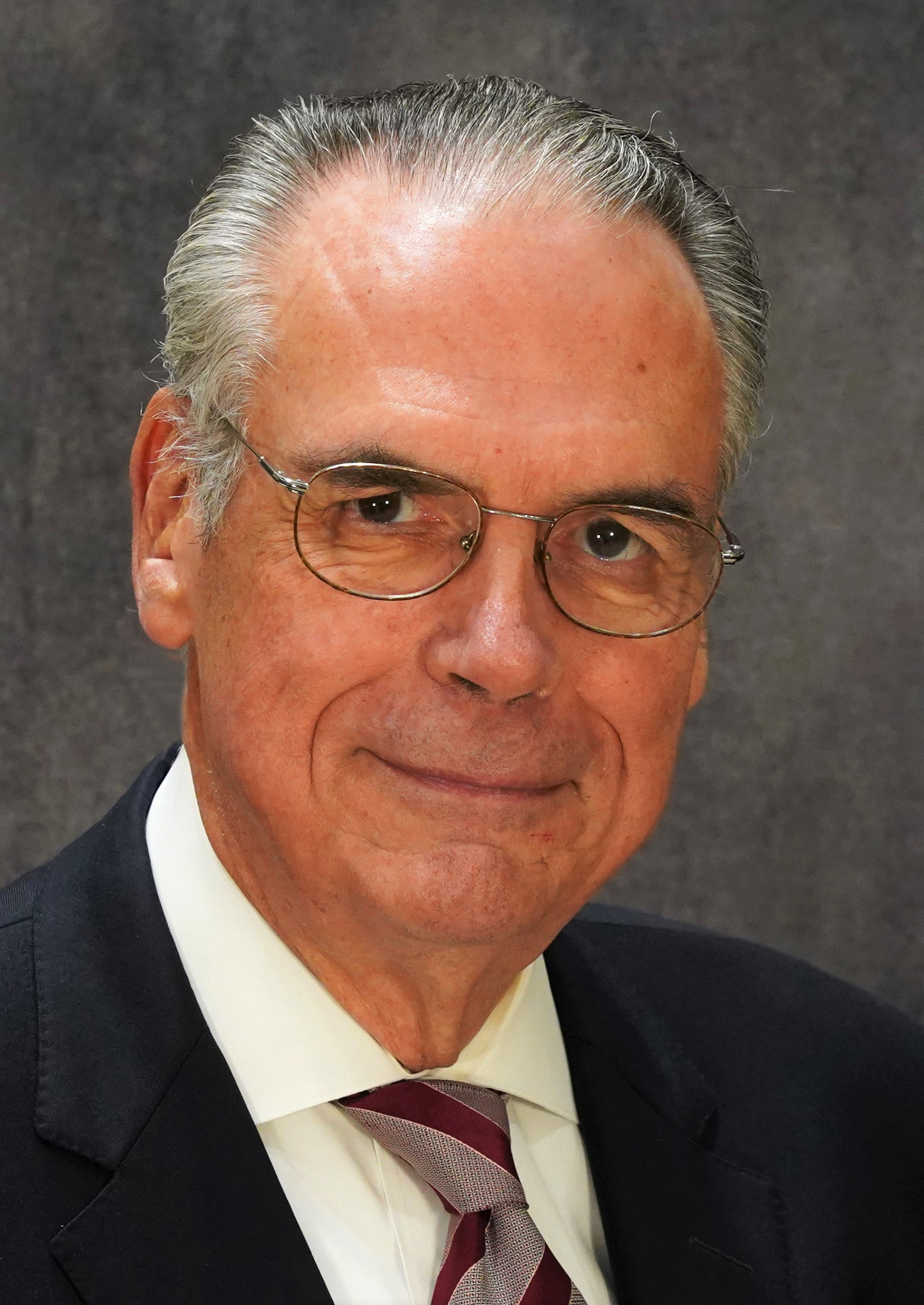

Senior Judge of the United States District Court for the Western District of Oklahoma
- Incumbent
- Assumed office December 1, 2014

Judge of the United States District Court for the Western District of Oklahoma
- In office November 12, 2001 – December 1, 2014
- Appointed by: George W. Bush
- Preceded by: Wayne Alley
- Succeeded by: Scott L. Palk

Personal details
- Born: 1947 (age 78–79) Troy, New York, U.S.
- Education: University of Oklahoma (BA, JD)

Stephen P. Friot (born 1947) is a senior United States district judge of the United States District Court for the Western District of Oklahoma.

== Education and career ==
Born in Troy, New York, Friot received a Bachelor of Arts degree from the University of Oklahoma in 1969 and a Juris Doctor from the University of Oklahoma College of Law in 1972. He was in private practice in Oklahoma from 1972 to 2001.

== District court service ==
On September 4, 2001, Friot was nominated by President George W. Bush to a seat on the United States District Court for the Western District of Oklahoma vacated by Wayne Alley. Friot was confirmed by the United States Senate on November 6, 2001, and received his commission on November 12, 2001. He assumed senior status on December 1, 2014.

In June 2017, Friot controversially suggested he would give a reduced sentence to a 34-year-old counterfeiting defendant if she got medically sterilized. He suggested it because she had seven children and had lost parental rights to six of them. In February 2018, he sentenced the woman to a year in federal prison, and he defended his sterilization suggestion by arguing the U.S. Supreme Court "has yet to recognize a constitutional right to bring crack- or methamphetamine-addicted babies into this world."

== Russian Activities ==
Judge Friot has traveled and lectured extensively in the Russian Federation. Those activities include service as the U.S. judicial delegate to the Tenth International Forum on Constitutional Review, in Moscow in 2007; as a U.S. judicial delegate to the U.S.-Russia Judicial Partnership Forum in St. Petersburg (co-sponsored by the Constitutional Court of the Russian Federation) in 2011 and as a U.S. judicial delegate to the Second U.S. Russian Judicial Peer-to-Peer Dialog in Washington, D.C. in 2011.

In 2022, Judge Friot was named an Associate of the Romanoff Center for Russian Studies at the University of Oklahoma.

Judge Friot is the author of three articles published in the Comparative Constitutional Review (Moscow): "Judicial Independence: A Time for Patience, Persistence and Public Awareness" (64 CCR 4, 2008); "Boumediene v. Bush: The Latest Chapter in the U.S. Supreme Court's Jurisprudence at the Intersection of the War on Terror and the Constitutional Doctrine of Separation of Powers" (66 CCR 147, 2008), and "Citation of Foreign Sources of Law by the United States Supreme Court in Cases Addressing Business and Economic Issues: An Analysis of Long-Standing Practice and Contemporary Controversy" (81 CCR 23, 2011).

Judge Friot has lectured as an invited guest lecturer at the faculties of law at the Kutafin Moscow State Law University (2019), the Lobachevsky State University in Nizhny Novgorod (2011, 2012, 2014, 2017), the Moscow State Institute of International Relations (MGIMO) (2019), Moscow State University (2015 and 2019), the Pericles Law Center, Moscow (2019), the Russian State University of Justice (2019), Saratov State Law Academy (2015 - 2019), and Ulyanovsk State University (2008). He was a plenary speaker at the Conference of Judges of the Regional Court of Arbitration at the Academy of Justice, Nizhny Novgorod in 2012, at the Research to Practice Conference, Lobachevsky State University Faculty of Law, Nizhny Novgorod in 2014, and at the Second Moscow Legal Forum, Kutafin Moscow State Law University, in 2015.

== Published Work ==
Judge Friot is the author of Containing History: How Cold War History Explains U.S.-Russia Relations, published by the University of Oklahoma Press in June, 2023.

== Honors and awards ==
Judge Friot was the recipient of the 2008 Global Vision Award, presented by the Oklahoma City affiliate of Sister Cities International; the Judge of the Year Award, presented by the American Board of Trial Advocates, 2004; the Oklahoma Bar Association Award of Judicial Excellence, 2012; the Journal Record Leadership in Law Award, 2016 and the Oklahoma County Bar Association Professional Service Award, 2018.

== Sources ==
Legal offices
Preceded by Wayne Alley	Judge of the United States District Court for the Western District of Oklahoma; 2001–2014	Succeeded by Scott L. Palk
