= Joe L. Heaton =

American judge (born 1951)

Senior Judge of the United States District Court for the Western District of Oklahoma
- Incumbent
- Assumed office July 1, 2019

Chief Judge of the United States District Court for the Western District of Oklahoma
- In office November 25, 2015 – July 1, 2019
- Preceded by: Vicki Miles-LaGrange
- Succeeded by: Timothy D. DeGiusti

Judge of the United States District Court for the Western District of Oklahoma
- In office December 10, 2001 – July 1, 2019
- Appointed by: George W. Bush
- Preceded by: Ralph Gordon Thompson
- Succeeded by: Bernard M. Jones

Personal details
- Born: December 12, 1951 (age 74) Alva, Oklahoma
- Party: Republican
- Education: Northwestern Oklahoma State University (BA); University of Oklahoma College of Law (JD)

Joe L. Heaton (born December 12, 1951) is a senior United States district judge of the United States District Court for the Western District of Oklahoma.

== Education and career ==
Born in Alva, Oklahoma, Heaton received a Bachelor of Arts degree from Northwestern Oklahoma State University in 1973 and a Juris Doctor from the University of Oklahoma College of Law in 1976. He was a Legislative assistant to United States Senator Dewey F. Bartlett from 1976 to 1977. He was in private practice in Oklahoma City, from 1977 to 1992 and from 1993 to 1996, also serving as an adjunct instructor at the University of Central Oklahoma from 1980 to 1981 and from 1992 to 1993. Then he was elected as a Republican to serve in the Oklahoma House of Representatives as a state representative in 1984, and was re-elected three times, serving from 1985 to 1993. Next, Heaton was a special Assistant United States Attorney in the United States Attorney's Office, Western District of Oklahoma from 1992 to 1993. Following that, he was a First Assistant United States Attorney of the United States Attorney's Office, Western District of Oklahoma from 1996 to 2001.

== District court service ==
On September 4, 2001, Heaton was nominated by President George W. Bush to a seat on the United States District Court for the Western District of Oklahoma vacated by Ralph Gordon Thompson. Heaton was confirmed by the United States Senate on December 6, 2001, and received his commission on December 10, 2001. He became Chief Judge on November 25, 2015. He assumed senior status on July 1, 2019.

== Notable cases ==
In 2008, Heaton ruled that the Oklahoma Water Resources Board’s moratorium on out-of-state water sales applied not only to contracts as the Oklahoma Water Resources Board had argued but also to an application by Tarrant Regional Water District to buy water from the Kiamichi River to meet the water needs of rapidly growing Tarrant County and some adjacent areas in Texas. The case would ultimately reach the Supreme Court, where Oklahoma's ban on out-of-state water sales was unanimously upheld in Tarrant Regional Water District, Petitioner v. Rudolf John Herrmann, et al..

In November 2012, Heaton ruled against Hobby Lobby in its bid not to be forced to provide emergency contraception to its employees. On July 19, 2013, he granted the company a preliminary injunction, barring HHS from enforcing the contraception mandate against Hobby Lobby and its affiliate Mardel Christian Bookstores.

== Sources ==
Legal offices
Preceded by Ralph Gordon Thompson	Judge of the United States District Court for the Western District of Oklahoma; 2001–2019	Succeeded by Bernard M. Jones
Preceded by Vicki Miles-LaGrange	Chief Judge of the United States District Court for the Western District of Oklahoma; 2015–2019	Succeeded by Timothy D. DeGiusti
