= Jerry Adair =

American baseball player (1936–1987)

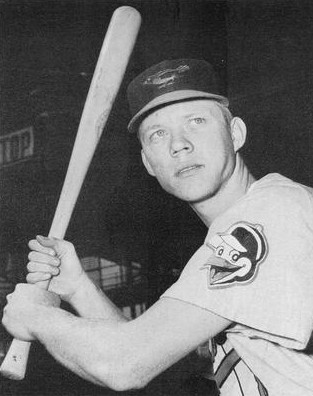
- Adair in 1963
- Second baseman / Shortstop
- Born: December 17, 1936; Sand Springs, Oklahoma, U.S.
- Died: May 31, 1987 (aged 50); Tulsa, Oklahoma, U.S.
- Batted: Right Threw: Right

MLB debut
- September 2, 1958, for the Baltimore Orioles

Last MLB appearance
- May 3, 1970, for the Kansas City Royals

MLB statistics
- Batting average: .254
- Home runs: 57
- Runs batted in: 366

NPB statistics
- Batting average: .300
- Home runs: 7
- Runs batted in: 36
- Stats at Baseball Reference

Teams
- As player: Baltimore Orioles (1958–1966); Chicago White Sox (1966–1967); Boston Red Sox (1967–1968); Kansas City Royals (1969–1970); Hankyu Braves (1971); As coach: Oakland Athletics (1972–1974); California Angels (1975)

Career highlights and awards
- 3× World Series champion (1972–1974)

Kenneth Jerry Adair (/ˈeɪdɛər/ AY-dair; December 17, 1936 – May 31, 1987) was an American professional baseball player and coach. He played in Major League Baseball (MLB) and the Nippon Professional Baseball league (NPB) as a second baseman and shortstop from 1958 to 1971, most prominently as a member of the Baltimore Orioles where he was the starting second baseman for five seasons.

Adair was known as one of the best fielding second basemen of his era, setting a Major League record for second basemen when he fielded 458 consecutive chances without an error. He also played for the Chicago White Sox, Boston Red Sox and Kansas City Royals. Adair played his final season as a professional baseball player with the Hankyu Braves (now known as the Orix Buffaloes) of the NPB. After his playing career, he worked as a coach for several Major League organizations.

== Early life ==
Adair was born in Sand Springs, Oklahoma on December 17, 1936, to Kinnie and Ola Adair. He was of partial Cherokee descent, and Kinnie Adair spoke Cherokee. Adair graduated from Sand Springs High School (which was later replaced by Charles Page High School). He earned nine letters in high school, three each in baseball, football, and basketball, and was his school's quarterback. His high school coach, former professional baseball and basketball player and star college athlete Cecil Hankins, considered Adair the greatest all-around athlete he ever coached. Adair was known as the "Iceman" in high school because of his coolness under pressure. He was selected to the All-State basketball team in 1955, and was most outstanding player in the summer 1955 All-Star game.

== College ==
Adair entered Oklahoma State University (OSU) in the fall of 1955 on a basketball and baseball scholarship. He played college baseball under coach Toby Greene, and basketball under Naismith Memorial Basketball Hall of Fame coach Hank Iba. Adair's role as a basketball player was more prominent at OSU. He started for Iba as a sophomore, and was the team's second leading scorer that year and in his junior year (his last year at OSU). On February 21, 1957, he was part of the OSU team that came back to defeat Wilt Chamberlain's University of Kansas team 56-54, scoring six points, with seven rebounds. He later played an instrumental role in OSU defeating Oscar Robertson's Cincinnati Bearcats team, scoring 12 points, with five rebounds.

Adair was OSU's shortstop in his junior year, with a team leading .438 batting average. He was named to the All-Big Eight team, an OSU first. He was selected to the All-American second team by the American Baseball Coaches Association. In his two years on the team, the Cowboys were 29–9, with Adair hitting .387.

Adair also played one year in a work/play program for the McPherson (Kansas) BJs in the Ban Johnson League. That year, McPherson went to the National Ban Johnson League tournament finals played in Wichita. He pitched many games as well as playing the infield. In one game, while being scouted by coach Greene, he was called on to pitch in relief with a 1-0 lead in the bottom of the ninth inning, with the bases loaded and no outs. Adair struck out the next three batters.

== Professional career ==
=== Baltimore Orioles ===
Adair was signed by the Baltimore Orioles out of Oklahoma State University on September 2, 1958, for a $40,000 bonus. He made his Major League Baseball debut with the club that day against the Washington Senators, coming into the game in the bottom of the 8th inning as a defensive replacement for shortstop Chuck Oertel. He did not get an at bat in the game. Adair's first big league at bat came on September 5 against the Boston Red Sox. After drawing a walk and scoring in the 8th inning, Adair reached base again in the ninth inning on a fielder's choice. He picked up his first big league hit (a single to left field) in a 3–2 Orioles win over the visiting New York Yankees on September 21. That season, he hit .105 (2-for-19) in 11 games with the Orioles, primarily playing shortstop.

He spent most of the 1959 season with Amarillo Gold Sox, the Orioles affiliate in the Double-A Texas League. He had a .309 batting average in 146 games. When he was called up to the Orioles at the end of the season, Adair hit .314 (11-for-35) in 12 games. He played most of the 1960 season for the Triple-A Miami Marlins, batting .266, and playing principally at shortstop, where he had a .967 fielding percentage. When he was called up to the Orioles at the end of the season, he went 1-for-5 (.200) in 3 games.

Adair's first full season in the big leagues came in 1961 with the Orioles, hitting .264 with 9 home runs and 37 RBIs (runs batted in) in 133 games. Although the majority of his time was spent at second base, he also played some shortstop and third base that year. He had a .987 fielding percentage at second base, and .946 at shortsop. In 1962, his .969 fielding percentage at shortstop was fourth in the league, led by Chicago White Sox shortstop Luis Aparicio at .973. In 1963, Adair played in only 109 games, the fewest he played between 1961 and 1966. He hit only .228 with six home runs, but had a .985 fielding percentage at second base. Had he played in enough games, this would have given him the third best percentage among second basemen that year.

In 1964, the Orioles had Aparicio at shortstop (via a 1963 trade), Adair at second base, and Brooks Robinson playing third base. Aparicio led American League shortstops with a .979 fielding percentage, Adair led the league's second basemen with a .994 fielding percentage (making only five errors all year), and Robinson led AL third basemen with a .972 fielding percentage. Orioles first baseman Norm Siebern was third among AL first basemen in fielding percentage. Both Robinson (16 consecutive Gold Glove Awards) and Aparicio (nine Gold Glove Awards) were elected to the Hall of Fame, in large part based on their fielding ability. Aparicio and Adair ultimately played three years together (1963-1965), and are considered one of the top middle infield combinations in baseball history. Their combined fielding percentage during that time was .984.

Once, during the 1964 season, he was struck in the mouth by a bad throw during the first game of a doubleheader with the Detroit Tigers. The resulting laceration required 11 stitches, but Adair was back in the park in uniform in time to play the entire second game. In 1964, the Orioles finished in third place, two games behind the Yankees for the AL championship.

In 1965, 28-year-old Adair hit .259 with 7 home runs and a career-high 66 RBIs in 157 games with the Orioles. He was among American League leaders with 157 games (8th in the AL), 582 at bats (10th in the AL), 26 doubles (7th in the AL), 115 singles (10th in the AL) and 6 sacrifice flies (8th in the AL). As a result, Adair finished 17th in the AL MVP vote that was won by Zoilo Versalles of the Minnesota Twins. He again led all AL second basemen in fielding percentage (.985), and Aparicio led all shortstops (.971). Over the course of the 1964 and 1965 seasons, Adair set a Major League record for second basemen when he handled 458 consecutive chances without committing an error. His record was broken by Manny Trillo in 1982.

=== Chicago White Sox ===
On June 12, 1966, Adair was traded by the Orioles with minor leaguer John Riddle to the Chicago White Sox for Eddie Fisher. He had been supplanted by Davey Johnson as the starting second base to begin the regular season and angrily requested to be traded "any place but Washington; Washington's too near Baltimore." In 105 games with the White Sox, Adair started more games at shortstop than second base, and batted .243 with four home runs for the White Sox.

=== Boston Red Sox ===
On June 2, 1967, Adair was traded by the White Sox to the Boston Red Sox for Don McMahon and minor leaguer Rob Snow. Adair played well down the stretch with the Red Sox, hitting .291 with 3 homers and 26 RBIs in 89 games, rounding out his season stats to .271 with 3 HR and 35 RBIs in 117 games. With his pennant push performance at the plate, coupled with stellar defensive play, Adair finished 15th in the AL MVP balloting. Teammate Carl Yastrzemski won the award that year after claiming the elusive triple crown. The Red Sox lost to the Cardinals in the 1967 World Series, with Adair appearing in five games.

=== Kansas City Royals ===
Adair was taken by the Kansas City Royals with the 51st pick of the 1968 MLB expansion draft. In the Royals' inaugural season of 1969, the 32-year-old Adair hit .250 with 5 home runs and 48 RBIs in 126 games. His .984 fielded percentage at second base was second in the league (only behind Dick Green, .986).

In 1970, Adair hit just .148 (4-for-27) before being abruptly released on May 5 as he was about to board a plane to make a road trip to Baltimore with the team. Adair had spent much of spring training that year with his six-year-old daughter, Tammy, who had terminal cancer and eventually died and claimed the Royals let him go without taking the family's problems into consideration. Royals General Manager Cedric Tallis defended the team's decision to release Adair, saying "We just felt he couldn't help the club".

In 1970, he also played 33 games for the Tulsa Oilers of the Triple-A American Association, in the St. Louis Cardinals minor league system. He had only 27 at-bats. In 1971, Adair finished his professional career playing 90 games for the Hankyu Braves in the Japan Pacific League.

Adair's nickname during his major league days was Casper the Friendly Ghost.

== Coaching ==
Adair later coached for the Oakland Athletics (1972–74, their World Championship years) and the California Angels (1975), working under his former Oriole teammate and manager in Boston Dick Williams in 1972-1973 and 1975, and for Alvin Dark in 1974.

== Legacy ==
While having only a .254 career batting average, he was considered a good clutch hitter (Carl Yastrzemski wrote in his autobiography Baseball, The Wall, and Me "That man was one of the coolest clutch hitters I had seen"). However, his greatest strength was his defensive ability. Adair set then-major league records for single-season fielding percentage (.994) and fewest errors (5) in 1964, and followed that up by leading the league in fielding percentage again in 1965. He also set a record for consecutive errorless games by a second baseman (89), and consecutive chances handled without an error (458) from July 22, 1964, through May 6, 1965. His .985 lifetime fielding percentage at second base is better than his Hall of Fame contemporaries Nellie Fox, Joe Morgan and Bill Mazeroski. As of 2025, he has the 43rd highest fielding percentage in major league history. In addition, he was considered a "gamer" who would often play when injured.

== Honors ==
Adair was inducted into the OSU Baseball Hall of Fame in 2001.

The glove Adair used in 1964 is in the Baseball Hall of Fame.

Adair was inducted into the Sand Springs Sandite Hall of Fame in 1992.

The Jerry Adair Baseball Complex in Sand Springs' River City Parks in Oklahoma was named in honor of Adair.

== Death ==
Adair died of liver cancer on May 31, 1987, in Tulsa, Oklahoma, at the age of 50.
