= Walter Henry Sanborn =

American judge (1845-1928)

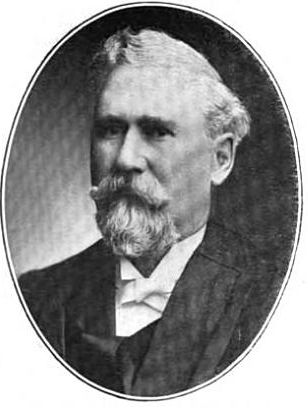

Judge of the United States Court of Appeals for the Eighth Circuit
- In office March 17, 1892 – May 10, 1928
- Appointed by: Benjamin Harrison
- Preceded by: Seat established by 26 Stat. 826
- Succeeded by: John Hazelton Cotteral

Judge of the United States Circuit Courts for the Eighth Circuit
- In office March 17, 1892 – December 31, 1911
- Appointed by: Benjamin Harrison
- Preceded by: Seat established by 26 Stat. 826
- Succeeded by: Seat abolished

Personal details
- Born: Walter Henry Sanborn; October 19, 1845 Epsom, New Hampshire
- Died: May 10, 1928 (aged 82) Saint Paul, Minnesota
- Education: Dartmouth College (AB, AM) read law

Walter Henry Sanborn (October 19, 1845 – May 10, 1928) was a United States circuit judge of the United States Court of Appeals for the Eighth Circuit and the United States Circuit Courts for the Eighth Circuit.

== Education and career ==
Born in Epsom, New Hampshire, Sanborn received an Artium Baccalaureus degree from Dartmouth College in 1867 and an Artium Magister degree from the same institution in 1870. He was a high school teacher and principal in Milford, New Hampshire from 1867 to 1870. He read law to enter the bar in 1871. He was in private practice in Saint Paul, Minnesota from 1871 to 1892. He was an alderman for Saint Paul from 1878 to 1880, and from 1885 to 1892.

== Federal judicial service ==
Sanborn was nominated by President Benjamin Harrison on February 10, 1892, to the United States Court of Appeals for the Eighth Circuit and the United States Circuit Courts for the Eighth Circuit, to a new joint seat authorized by 26 Stat. 826. He was confirmed by the United States Senate on March 17, 1892, and received his commission the same day. On December 31, 1911, the Circuit Courts were abolished and he thereafter served only on the Court of Appeals. He was a member of the Conference of Senior Circuit Judges (now the Judicial Conference of the United States) from 1922 to 1926. His service terminated on May 10, 1928, due to his death in Saint Paul.

=== Notable cases ===
Sanborn conducted the receiverships of the Union Pacific Railroad (1893–98), the Chicago Great Western Railroad (1908-09), and the Frisco Railroad (1913–14). He also handed down important decisions in the Trans-Missouri Freight Association Case (1893), the Standard Oil Case (1909), and the Oklahoma Gas Case (1911).

== See also ==
- List of United States federal judges by longevity of service

== Sources ==
- Rines, George Edwin, ed. (1920). "Sanborn, Walter Henry" . Encyclopedia Americana.

Legal offices
| Preceded by Seat established by 26 Stat. 826 | Judge of the United States Circuit Courts for the Eighth Circuit; 1892–1911 | Succeeded by Seat abolished |
| Preceded by Seat established by 26 Stat. 826 | Judge of the United States Court of Appeals for the Eighth Circuit; 1892–1928 | Succeeded by John Hazelton Cotteral |
