= Scott L. Palk =

American judge (born 1967)

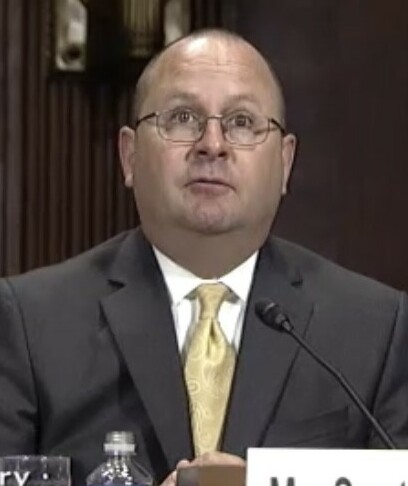

Chief Judge of the United States District Court for the Western District of Oklahoma
- Incumbent
- Assumed office July 1, 2026
- Preceded by: Timothy D. DeGiusti

Judge of the United States District Court for the Western District of Oklahoma
- Incumbent
- Assumed office October 31, 2017
- Appointed by: Donald Trump
- Preceded by: Stephen P. Friot

Personal details
- Born: Scott Lawrence Palk; 1967 (age 58–59) Tulsa, Oklahoma, U.S.
- Education: Oklahoma State University (BS); University of Oklahoma (JD)

Scott Lawrence Palk (born 1967) is an American attorney and academic serving as the chief United States district judge of the United States District Court for the Western District of Oklahoma. He formerly served as the assistant dean at the University of Oklahoma College of Law.

== Education and legal career ==
Palk is a 1985 graduate of Charles Page High School in Sand Springs, Oklahoma. He received a Bachelor of Science degree in 1989 from Oklahoma State University and a Juris Doctor in 1992 from the University of Oklahoma College of Law.

From 1992 to 2002, Palk served as an assistant district attorney for Cleveland County in Norman, Oklahoma, serving as first assistant district attorney from 1999 to 2002. From 2002 to 2011, he served as an assistant United States attorney in the Criminal Division of the United States Attorney's Office for the Western District of Oklahoma, holding a number of managerial roles beginning in 2004, including deputy criminal chief and anti-terrorism advisory council coordinator. Palk won Prosecutor of the Year awards in 1993 and 2004.

From 2011 until his confirmation as a federal judge, he served as the assistant dean for students and assistant general counsel at the University of Oklahoma College of Law. In addition to overseeing admissions and providing legal counsel, he served as a consultant to the University's Threat Assessment Review Committee, advising in areas of criminal threat assessment and legal access.

== Federal judicial service ==
=== Expired district court nomination under Obama ===
On December 16, 2015, President Barack Obama nominated Palk to serve as a United States district judge of the United States District Court for the Western District of Oklahoma, to the seat vacated by Judge Stephen P. Friot, who assumed senior status on December 1, 2014. He received a hearing before the United States Senate Judiciary Committee on April 20, 2016. On May 19, 2016, his nomination was reported out of committee by a voice vote. His nomination expired on January 3, 2017, with the end of the 114th Congress.

=== Renomination to district court under Trump ===
On May 7, 2017, a White House official indicated that Palk would be renominated by President Donald Trump to the same seat. His renomination was announced on May 8, 2017. On June 15, 2017, his nomination was reported out of the United States Senate Judiciary Committee by a 17–3 vote. On October 25, 2017, the United States Senate invoked cloture on his nomination by a 79–18 vote. On October 26, 2017, Palk was confirmed by a 79–16 vote. He received his judicial commission on October 31, 2017. He became chief judge of the court in 2026.

== Personal life ==
Palk was inducted into the Charles Page High School Hall of Fame in 2019.

== See also ==
- Barack Obama judicial appointment controversies

Legal offices
Preceded by Stephen P. Friot	Judge of the United States District Court for the Western District of Oklahoma; 2017–present	Incumbent
Preceded by Timothy D. DeGiusti	Chief Judge of the United States District Court for the Western District of Oklahoma; 2026–present	Incumbent
