= Jodi W. Dishman =

American judge (born 1979)

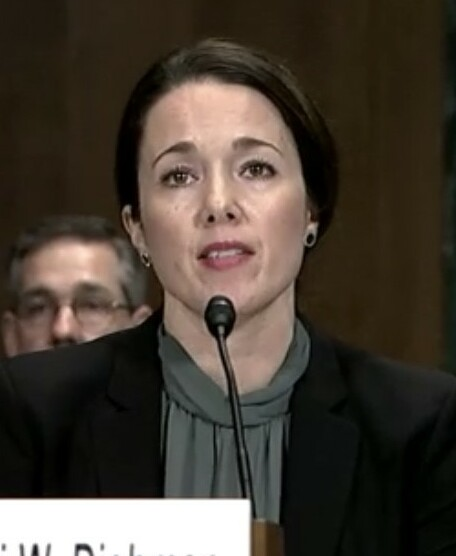

Judge of the United States District Court for the Western District of Oklahoma
- Incumbent
- Assumed office December 20, 2019
- Appointed by: Donald Trump
- Preceded by: Vicki Miles-LaGrange

Personal details
- Born: Jodi Marie Warmbrod; 1979 (age 46–47) Memphis, Tennessee, U.S.
- Spouse: Brent Dishman
- Education: Southern Methodist University (BBA); University of Oklahoma (JD)

Jodi Marie W. Dishman (née Warmbrod; born 1979) is a United States district judge of the United States District Court for the Western District of Oklahoma.

== Education ==
Dishman earned her Bachelor of Business Administration, cum laude, from Southern Methodist University and her Juris Doctor, summa cum laude, from the University of Oklahoma College of Law, where she served as editor-in-chief of the Oklahoma Law Review.

== Legal career ==
Upon graduation from law school, Dishman served as a law clerk to Judges Edward C. Prado and Carolyn Dineen King of the United States Court of Appeals for the Fifth Circuit. She spent five years as an attorney in the San Antonio office of Akin Gump Strauss Hauer & Feld. From 2012 to 2019, she was a shareholder at McAfee & Taft in Oklahoma City, where her practice focused on complex civil litigation in federal and state courts and where she served as President of the Oklahoma City Chapter of the Federal Bar Association.

== Federal judicial service ==
On August 14, 2019, President Donald Trump announced his intent to nominate Dishman to serve as a United States district judge for the United States District Court for the Western District of Oklahoma. On September 9, 2019, her nomination was sent to the Senate. President Trump nominated Dishman to the seat vacated by Judge Vicki Miles-LaGrange, who assumed senior status on November 5, 2018. On September 25, 2019, a hearing on her nomination was held before the Senate Judiciary Committee. On October 31, 2019, her nomination was reported out of committee by a 17–5 vote. On December 18, 2019, the United States Senate invoked cloture on her nomination by a 76–17 vote. On December 19, 2019, her nomination was confirmed by a 75–17 vote. She received her judicial commission on December 20, 2019.

== Personal life ==
She is married to Brent Dishman, whom Governor Kevin Stitt appointed as District Judge on the Oklahoma County District Court on October 11, 2021. They have two sons.

Legal offices
Preceded by Vicki Miles-LaGrange	Judge of the United States District Court for the Western District of Oklahoma; 2019–present	Incumbent
