= Sanford Coats =

American attorney (born 1971)

Sanford Charles Coats
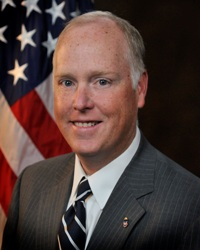

United States Attorney for the Western District of Oklahoma
- In office December 30, 2009 – January 16, 2016
- Appointed by: Barack Obama
- Preceded by: John C. Richter
- Succeeded by: Timothy J. Downing

Personal details
- Born: 1971 (age 54–55) Oklahoma City, Oklahoma, U.S.
- Education: Tulane University (BA); University of Oklahoma College of Law (JD)

Sanford Charles "Sandy" Coats (born 1971) is the former United States Attorney for the Western District of Oklahoma.

== Early life and education ==
Coats was born in Oklahoma City, Oklahoma in 1971. His father, Andy Coats, served as mayor of Oklahoma City and was the Democratic Party's unsuccessful candidate in the 1980 Oklahoma Senate election.

Coats attended Bishop McGuinness High School in Oklahoma City, Oklahoma and received a Bachelor of Arts from Tulane University in 1994. He then attended the University of Oklahoma College of Law, where his father served as dean beginning in 1996, and earned his Juris Doctor in 1998. After completing law school, Coats served as a law clerk for Judge Marian P. Opala of the Oklahoma Supreme Court.

== Career ==
Coats served as an Assistant U.S. Attorney in the Western District of Oklahoma from 2004 to 2009. From October 2007 to August 2008, Coats was Chief of the Major Crimes Section and also Project Safe Childhood coordinator. In the aftermath of Hurricane Katrina, Coats volunteered to temporarily serve as an Associate U.S. Attorney in the Eastern District of Louisiana, based in New Orleans, from April 2007 to September 2007.

On September 30, 2009, President Barack Obama nominated Coats to serve as the United States Attorney for the Western District of Oklahoma. He was confirmed by the United States Senate on December 24, 2009 and was sworn into office on December 30, 2009.

Legal offices
Preceded by John C. Richter	United States Attorney for the Western District of Oklahoma; 2009–2016	Succeeded by Timothy J. Downing
