= Edgar Sullins Vaught =

American judge

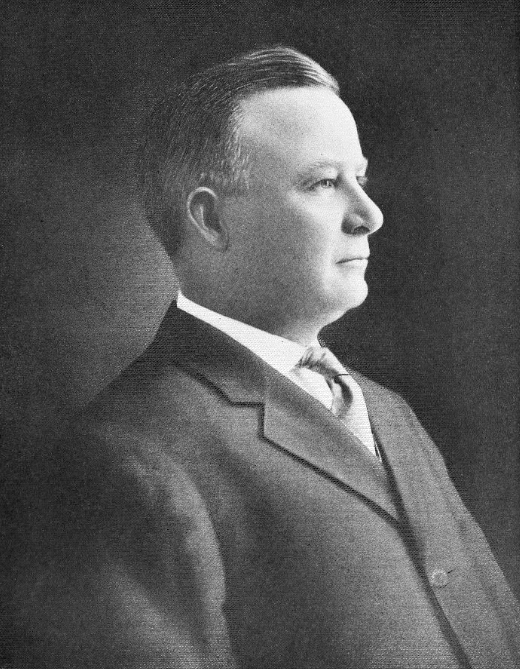

Senior Judge of the United States District Court for the Western District of Oklahoma
- In office April 22, 1956 – December 5, 1959

Chief Judge of the United States District Court for the Western District of Oklahoma
- In office 1949–1956
- Preceded by: Office established
- Succeeded by: Stephen Sanders Chandler Jr.

Judge of the United States District Court for the Western District of Oklahoma
- In office May 31, 1928 – April 22, 1956
- Appointed by: Calvin Coolidge
- Preceded by: John Hazelton Cotteral
- Succeeded by: Ross Rizley

Personal details
- Born: January 7, 1873 Cedar Springs, Virginia, U.S.
- Died: December 5, 1959 (aged 86) Oklahoma City, Oklahoma, U.S.
- Education: Emory and Henry College; Carson–Newman University (B.S.) read law
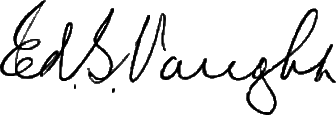
- Signature

Edgar Sullins Vaught (January 7, 1873 – December 5, 1959) was a United States district judge of the United States District Court for the Western District of Oklahoma.

== Education and career ==
Born in Cedar Springs, an unincorporated community located at the boundary of Smyth County and Wythe County, Virginia, Vaught attended Emory and Henry College in Emory, Virginia, and received a Bachelor of Science degree from Carson and Newman College (now Carson–Newman University) in Jefferson City, Tennessee in 1899, before reading law to enter the bar in 1906. In 1901, he moved to Oklahoma City (then in Oklahoma Territory) where he embarked on a career in education - first as principal of Irving High School, and by 1906 becoming superintendent of the Oklahoma City School system. Then he switched careers to law and began a private practice in Oklahoma City from 1906 to 1928. (Note: In one year he reportedly handled 63 jury trials and won 57 of them.)

== Federal judicial service ==
Vaught received a recess appointment from President Calvin Coolidge on May 31, 1928, to a seat on the United States District Court for the Western District of Oklahoma vacated by Judge John Hazelton Cotteral. He was nominated to the same position by President Coolidge on December 6, 1928. He was confirmed by the United States Senate on January 8, 1929, and received his commission the same day. Judge Vaught presided over George A. "Machine Gun" Kelly's trial in 1933 for the kidnapping of prominent Oklahoma City oilman Charles F. Urschel. Kelly was sentenced to life in prison by Vaught. He served as Chief Judge from 1949 to 1956. He assumed senior status on April 22, 1956. His service terminated on December 5, 1959, due to his death in Oklahoma City.

== Sources ==
Legal offices
Preceded by John Hazelton Cotteral	Judge of the United States District Court for the Western District of Oklahoma; 1928–1956	Succeeded by Ross Rizley
Preceded by Office established	Chief Judge of the United States District Court for the Western District of Oklahoma; 1949–1956	Succeeded by Stephen Sanders Chandler Jr.
