= Timothy D. Leonard =

American judge (1940–2026)

Senior Judge of the United States District Court for the Western District of Oklahoma
- In office August 21, 2006 – March 2, 2026

Judge of the United States District Court for the Western District of Oklahoma
- In office August 12, 1992 – August 21, 2006
- Appointed by: George H. W. Bush
- Preceded by: Layn R. Phillips
- Succeeded by: Timothy D. DeGiusti

United States Attorney for the Western District of Oklahoma
- In office 1989–1992
- President: George H. W. Bush
- Preceded by: Robert Mydans
- Succeeded by: John Green

Member of the Oklahoma Senate from the 49th district
- In office November 6, 1979 – 1988
- Preceded by: Leon B. Field
- Succeeded by: Don Williams

Personal details
- Born: January 22, 1940 Beaver, Oklahoma, U.S.
- Died: March 2, 2026 (aged 86)
- Party: Republican
- Education: University of Oklahoma (BA, JD)

Timothy Dwight Leonard (January 22, 1940 – March 2, 2026) was a United States district judge of the United States District Court for the Western District of Oklahoma.

== Life and career ==
Leonard was born in Beaver, Oklahoma, on January 22, 1940. He received a Bachelor of Arts degree from the University of Oklahoma in 1962 and a Juris Doctor from the University of Oklahoma College of Law in 1965. He was in the United States Navy Lieutenant Commander, JAG Corps from 1965 to 1968. He was a United States Naval Reserve Lieutenant from 1968 to 1972. He was an assistant state attorney general of Oklahoma from 1969 to 1971. He was in private practice in Oklahoma City in 1971, then in Beaver from 1971 to 1988. He ran for Oklahoma's 6th congressional district in 1974, losing the Republican primary to incumbent John Newbold Camp. He was a member of the Oklahoma Senate from 1979 to 1988. He was a minority floor leader from 1985 to 1986. He was in private practice in Oklahoma City from 1988 to 1989. He was a guest lecturer and adjunct professor, Oklahoma City University from 1988 to 1989. He was the United States attorney for the Western District of Oklahoma from 1989 to 1992.

=== Federal judicial service ===
Leonard was nominated by President George H. W. Bush on November 20, 1991, to a seat on the United States District Court for the Western District of Oklahoma vacated by Judge Layn R. Phillips. He was confirmed by the United States Senate on August 11, 1992, and received his commission on August 12, 1992. He assumed senior status on August 21, 2006. His service terminated upon his death on March 2, 2026.

=== Death ===
Leonard died on March 2, 2026, at the age of 86.

== Sources ==
Party political offices
Preceded by Norman Lamb	Republican nominee for Lieutenant Governor of Oklahoma; 1986	Succeeded by Terry Neese
Legal offices
Preceded by Layn R. Phillips	Judge of the United States District Court for the Western District of Oklahoma; 1992–2006	Succeeded by Timothy D. DeGiusti
