= Kent Frates =

Minority leader of the Oklahoma House of Representatives
- In office 1976–1978
- Preceded by: Charles Ford
- Succeeded by: Neal McCaleb

Member of the Oklahoma House of Representatives from the 83rd district
- In office 1971–1979
- Preceded by: Ralph Gordon Thompson
- Succeeded by: Stanley W. Alexander

Personal details
- Born: September 27, 1938 Oklahoma City, Oklahoma, United States
- Died: June 12, 2025 (aged 86) Oklahoma City, Oklahoma, United States
- Political party: Republican

Kent F. Frates was an American politician who represented the 83rd district of the Oklahoma House of Representatives from 1971 to 1979. He was also House's minority leader from 1976 to 1978.

== Biography ==
Kent F. Frates was born on September 27, 1938, in Oklahoma City. He attended Casady School, and he graduated from Stanford University and the University of Arkansas School of Law in 1964. He served in the United States Air Force Reserves from 1960 to 1966. A member of the Republican Party, he represented the 83rd district in the Oklahoma House of Representatives from 1971 to 1979. He was preceded in office by Ralph Gordon Thompson and succeeded by Stanley W. Alexander. From 1976 to 1978, he was the minority leader of the Oklahoma House of Representatives. He died on June 12, 2025, in Oklahoma City.
