= Layn R. Phillips =

American judge (born 1952)

Judge of the United States District Court for the Western District of Oklahoma
- In office June 15, 1987 – June 22, 1991
- Appointed by: Ronald Reagan
- Preceded by: Luther Boyd Eubanks
- Succeeded by: Timothy D. Leonard

Personal details
- Born: Layn Raymond Phillips; January 2, 1952 (age 74) Oklahoma City, Oklahoma, U.S.
- Spouse: Kathryn
- Children: 3, including Graham Phillips
- Education: University of Tulsa (B.S., B.A.); University of Tulsa College of Law (J.D.)

Layn Raymond Phillips (born January 2, 1952) is a former United States district judge of the United States District Court for the Western District of Oklahoma. He conducts alternative dispute resolution, including mediation and arbitration.

== Education and career ==
Born in Oklahoma City, Oklahoma, Phillips received dual Bachelor of Science and Bachelor of Arts degrees as an economics major from the University of Tulsa in 1974 and a Juris Doctor from the University of Tulsa College of Law in 1977. He competed in tennis for Tulsa. He was a trial attorney of the Bureau of Competition of the Federal Trade Commission in Washington, D.C. from 1977 to 1980. He was an Assistant United States Attorney of the Central District of California from 1980 to 1983. He was a Special Assistant United States Attorney in Miami, Florida from 1980 to 1981. He was the United States Attorney for the Northern District of Oklahoma from 1984 to 1987. He was an adjunct professor at the University of Tulsa from 1984 to 1987.

== Federal judicial service ==
Phillips was nominated by President Ronald Reagan on February 2, 1987, to a seat on the United States District Court for the Western District of Oklahoma vacated by Judge Luther Boyd Eubanks. He was confirmed by the United States Senate on June 11, 1987, and received his commission on June 15, 1987. Phillips served in that capacity until his resignation on June 22, 1991.

== Post judicial service ==
Phillips entered private practice in Newport Beach, California, as partner at Irell & Manella for 23 years. Following his departure from Irell & Manella, Phillips founded Phillips ADR, a dispute resolution firm. He is CEO, an arbitrator and mediator at the firm.

== Personal life ==
Phillips currently resides in Laguna Beach, California with his wife, Kathryn. He has three grown children, Amanda, Parker and Graham; a granddaughter, Stella Kathryn; and a grandson, Owen Layn.

== Sources ==
Legal offices
Preceded by Luther Boyd Eubanks	Judge of the United States District Court for the Western District of Oklahoma; 1987–1991	Succeeded by Timothy D. Leonard
