= Wayne Alley =

American judge (born 1932)

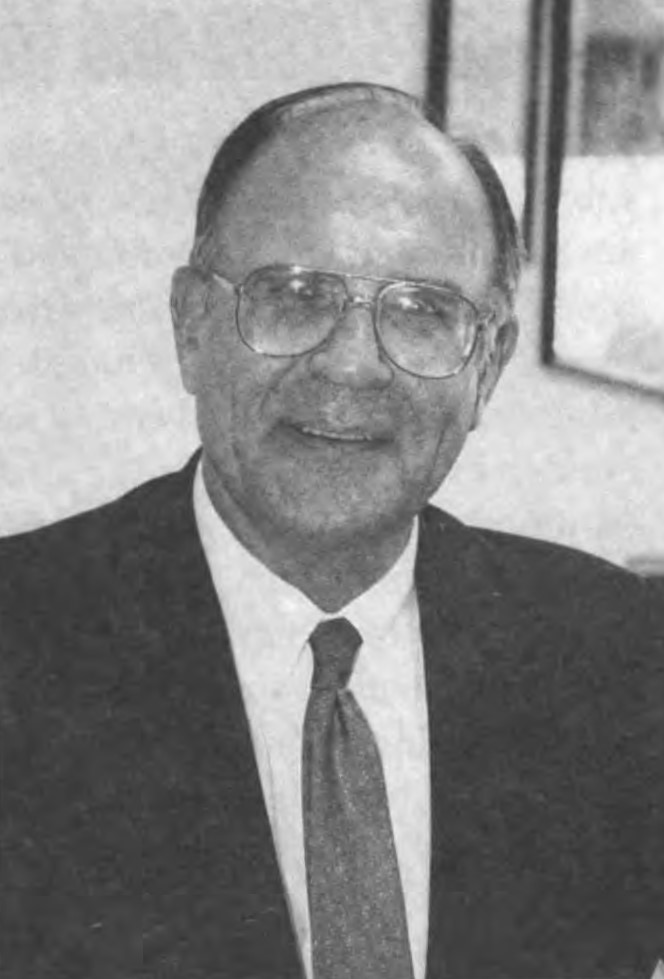

Senior Judge of the United States District Court for the Western District of Oklahoma
- Incumbent
- Assumed office May 16, 1999

Judge of the United States District Court for the Western District of Oklahoma
- In office July 11, 1985 – May 16, 1999
- Appointed by: Ronald Reagan
- Preceded by: Seat established by 98 Stat. 333
- Succeeded by: Stephen P. Friot

Personal details
- Born: Wayne Edward Alley; May 18, 1932 (age 93) Portland, Oregon, U.S.
- Education: Stanford University (AB, JD)

Wayne Edward Alley (born May 18, 1932) is an inactive senior United States district judge of the United States District Court for the Western District of Oklahoma.

== Biography ==
Alley was born in Portland, Oregon. He received an Artium Baccalaureus from Stanford University in 1952 and was a lieutenant in the United States Army during the Korean War, from 1952 to 1954. He received a Juris Doctor from Stanford Law School in 1957, and was a law clerk on the Supreme Court of Oregon, in Salem, Oregon in 1957, and then in private practice in Portland from 1957 to 1959. He returned to the military as assistant staff judge advocate, U. S. Army Artillery and Missile Center, Fort Sill, Oklahoma, 1959–1960 and then as assistant staff judge advocate, Headquarters, U. S. Army Ryukyu Islands (Okinawa, Japan), 1960–1964. He was in the Thirteenth Career Class, TJAGSA, 1965, and was a member of the faculty of Judge Advocate General's School in Charlottesville, Virginia, from 1965 to 1968. He was a military judge for the U.S. Army Trial Judiciary in Saigon, Republic of Vietnam, from 1968 to 1969, and at Schofield Barracks in Hawaii from 1970 to 1972. He then served on the U.S. Army Court of Military Review in Falls Church, Virginia, from 1972 to 1975, serving as chief trial judge of that court in 1975. He was chief of the Criminal Law Division, Office of the Judge Advocate General, Department of the Army, in Washington, D.C. from 1975 to 1978, and in the United States Army, judge advocate, in Heidelberg, Germany, from 1978 to 1981. He was dean and professor of law at the University of Oklahoma College of Law, in Norman, Oklahoma, from 1981 to 1985.

=== Federal judicial service ===
On May 29, 1985, Alley was nominated by President Ronald Reagan to a new seat on the United States District Court for the Western District of Oklahoma created by 98 Stat. 333. He was confirmed by the United States Senate on July 10, 1985, and received his commission the following day. He assumed senior status on May 16, 1999.

== Sources ==
Legal offices
Preceded by Seat established by 98 Stat. 333	Judge of the United States District Court for the Western District of Oklahoma; 1985–1999	Succeeded by Stephen P. Friot
