= Timothy J. Downing =

American attorney (born 1979)

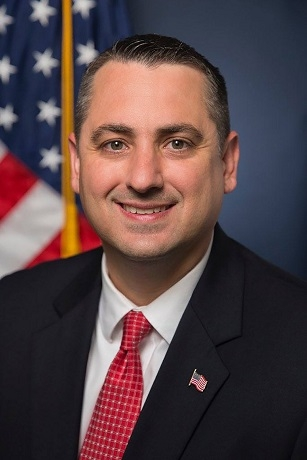

Judge of the Oklahoma Court of Civil Appeals
- Incumbent
- Assumed office May 27, 2022
- Appointed by: Kevin Stitt

United States Attorney for the Western District of Oklahoma
- In office June 5, 2019 – February 28, 2021
- President: Donald Trump; Joe Biden
- Preceded by: Sanford Coats
- Succeeded by: Robert J. Troester (acting)

Member of the Oklahoma House of Representatives from the 42nd district
- In office 2016–2018
- Preceded by: Lisa Johnson Billy
- Succeeded by: Cynthia Roe

Personal details
- Born: March 27, 1979 (age 47)
- Party: Republican
- Education: University of Oklahoma (B.A.); Oral Roberts University (M.Mgt.); Regent University School of Law (J.D.)

Military service
- Branch/Service: U.S. Army Reserve, 2011—Present

Timothy J. Downing (born March 27, 1979) is an American judge and politician who has served on the Oklahoma Court of Civil Appeals since 2022. He previously served as the United States Attorney for the United States District Court for the Western District of Oklahoma from 2019 to 2021 and represented the 42nd district of the Oklahoma House of Representatives from 2016 to 2018.

== Education ==
Downing received his Bachelor of Arts from the University of Oklahoma, his Master of Management from Oral Roberts University, and his Juris Doctor from the Regent University School of Law.

== Career and Military Service ==
From 2011 to 2016, Downing was an Assistant Attorney General for Oklahoma, where he represented the State of Oklahoma in criminal appeals, was a member of the Opinion Conference, and was Director of Legislative Affairs. Since 2011, he has also served as a Judge Advocate in the United States Army Reserve. In this capacity from 2013 to 2014, he served as a Special Assistant United States Attorney at Fort Hood, Texas, working with the United States Attorney's Office for the Western District of Texas.

== Oklahoma House of Representatives ==
From 2016 to 2018, Downing served in the Oklahoma House of Representatives where he was an Assistant Majority Floor Leader, an Assistant Majority Whip, and Vice-Chair of Judiciary Committee.

== U.S. Attorney for the Western District of Oklahoma ==
On March 1, 2019, President Donald Trump announced his intent to nominate Downing to be the U.S. Attorney for the Western District of Oklahoma. On March 5, 2019, his nomination was sent to the United States Senate. On May 9, 2019, his nomination was reported out of committee by voice vote. On May 23, 2019, the Senate confirmed his nomination by voice vote. He was sworn in on June 5, 2019. On February 9, 2021, he announced his resignation, effective February 28, 2021.

== Oklahoma Court of Civil Appeals ==
After his resignation as U.S. Attorney in 2021, Downing served as the First Assistant Attorney General of Oklahoma as the chief executive for the Attorney General until he was appointed to the state judiciary. On May 27, 2022, Oklahoma Governor Kevin Stitt appointed Downing to the Oklahoma Court of Civil Appeals.
