= Luther Boyd Eubanks =

American judge

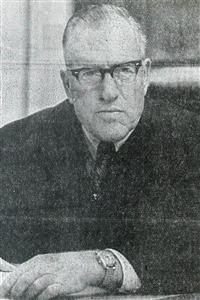

Senior Judge of the United States District Court for the Western District of Oklahoma
- In office June 30, 1986 – August 31, 1987

Chief Judge of the United States District Court for the Western District of Oklahoma
- In office 1982–1986
- Preceded by: Frederick Alvin Daugherty
- Succeeded by: Ralph Gordon Thompson

Judge of the United States District Court for the Western District of Oklahoma
- In office August 11, 1965 – June 30, 1986
- Appointed by: Lyndon B. Johnson
- Preceded by: Seat established by 71 Stat. 586
- Succeeded by: Layn R. Phillips

Personal details
- Born: Luther Boyd Eubanks; July 31, 1917 Caprock, New Mexico
- Died: January 21, 1996 (aged 78) Oklahoma City, Oklahoma
- Education: University of Oklahoma (B.A.); University of Oklahoma College of Law (LL.B.)

Luther Boyd Eubanks (July 31, 1917 – January 21, 1996) was a United States district judge of the United States District Court for the Western District of Oklahoma.

== Education and career ==
Born in Caprock, New Mexico, Eubanks received a Bachelor of Arts degree from the University of Oklahoma in 1940 and a Bachelor of Laws from the University of Oklahoma College of Law in 1942. He was a technician in the United States Army during World War II, from 1942 to 1945. He was a county attorney of Cotton County, Oklahoma from 1946 to 1949, and was a member of the Oklahoma House of Representatives from 1949 to 1952. He was in private practice in Walters, Oklahoma from 1950 to 1956. He was a Judge of the District Court of Oklahoma in Lawton from 1956 to 1965.

== Federal judicial service ==
Eubanks was nominated by President Lyndon B. Johnson on July 19, 1965, to the United States District Court for the Western District of Oklahoma, to a new seat authorized by 71 Stat. 586 following the certification of Ross Rizley as disabled. He was confirmed by the United States Senate on August 11, 1965, and received his commission on August 11, 1965. He served as Chief Judge from 1982 to 1986. He assumed senior status on June 30, 1986. His service terminated on August 31, 1987, due to his retirement.

== Death ==
Eubanks died on January 21, 1996, in Oklahoma City, Oklahoma.

== Sources ==
Legal offices
| Preceded by Seat established by 71 Stat. 586 | Judge of the United States District Court for the Western District of Oklahoma; 1965–1986 | Succeeded by Layn R. Phillips |
| Preceded by Frederick Alvin Daugherty | Chief Judge of the United States District Court for the Western District of Oklahoma; 1982–1986 | Succeeded by Ralph Gordon Thompson |
