= Michael Bowie =

American football player (born 1991)

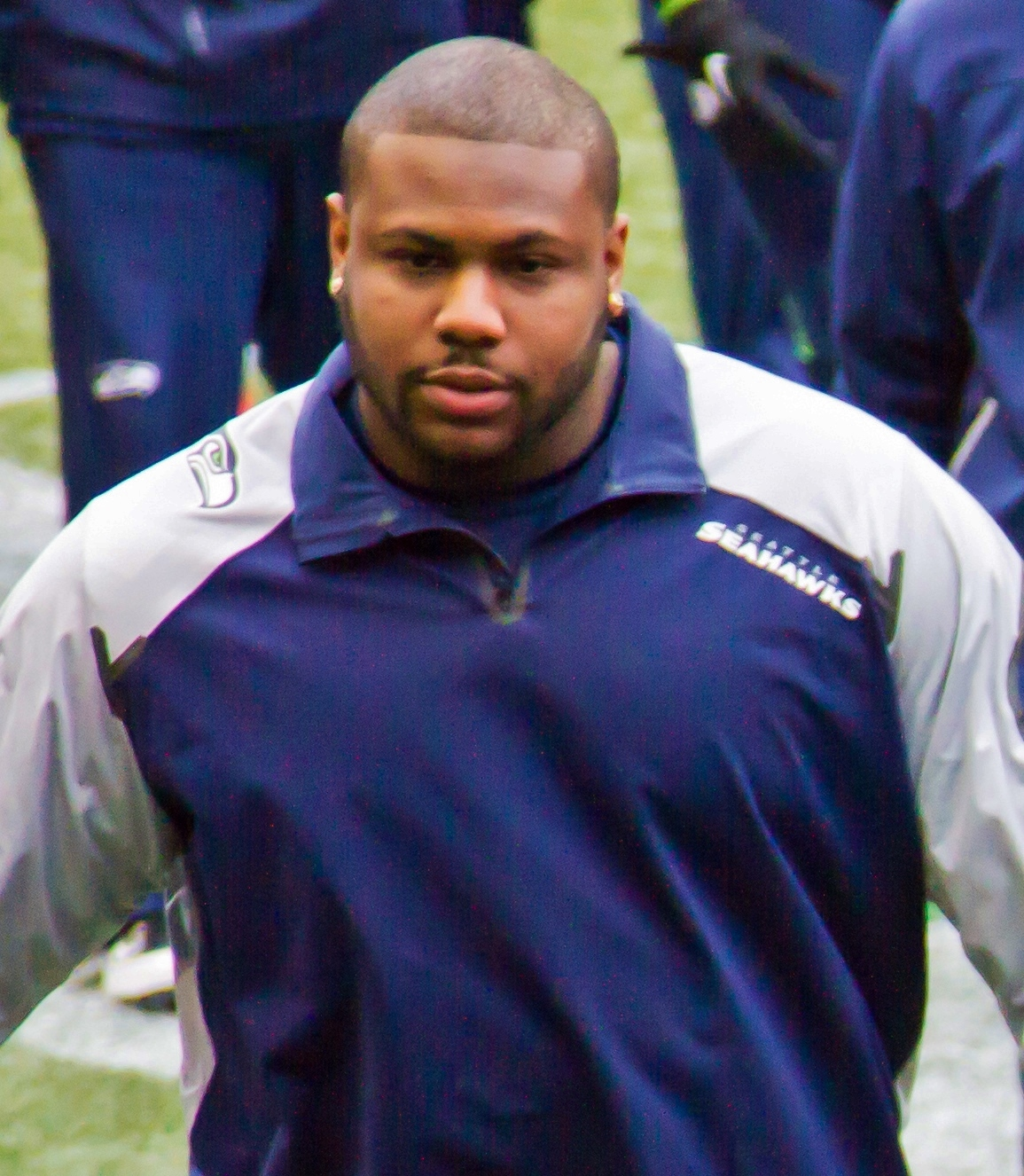
- Bowie with the Seattle Seahawks in 2013

No. 73
- Position: Offensive tackle

Personal information
- Born: September 25, 1991 (age 35); Tulsa, Oklahoma, U.S.
- Listed height: 6 ft 5 in (1.96 m)
- Listed weight: 332 lb (151 kg)

Career information
- High school: Charles Page (Sand Springs, Oklahoma)
- College: Northeastern State
- NFL draft: 2013: 7th round, 242nd overall pick

Career history
- Seattle Seahawks (2013); Cleveland Browns (2014–2016); New York Giants (2017)*
- * Offseason or practice squad member only

Awards and highlights
- Super Bowl champion (XLVIII)

Career NFL statistics
- Games played: 9
- Games started: 8
- Stats at Pro Football Reference

Michael Bowie (born September 25, 1991) is an American former professional football player who was an offensive tackle in the National Football League (NFL). He was selected by the Seattle Seahawks in the seventh round of the 2013 NFL draft. Bowie played college football for the Northeastern State RiverHawks.

== Professional career ==
=== Seattle Seahawks ===
Bowie was selected by the Seattle Seahawks in the seventh round (242nd pick overall) of the 2013 NFL draft. Due to injuries in the starting line, Bowie got his first career start in the overtime win vs the Houston Texans and eventually came to start. Towards the end of the year, Pete Carroll decided to rotate offensive lineman based on situations; Bowie was used often in the rotation as both a tackle and a guard. Bowie won Super Bowl XLVIII with the Seahawks when they defeated the Denver Broncos, 43–8.

Bowie was waived on August 2, 2014.

=== Cleveland Browns ===
Bowie was claimed off waivers by the Cleveland Browns on August 3, 2014. The Browns placed Bowie on injured reserve with a shoulder injury on August 26, 2014.

The Browns placed Bowie on the reserve/retired list on August 5, 2016. He was released on September 30, 2016.

=== New York Giants ===
On January 12, 2017, Bowie signed a reserve/future contract with the Giants. On August 23, 2017, Bowie was waived by the Giants after being issued a warrant for his arrest on a domestic assault and battery charge.
