= Bernard M. Jones =

American judge (born 1979)

Bernard M. Jones II
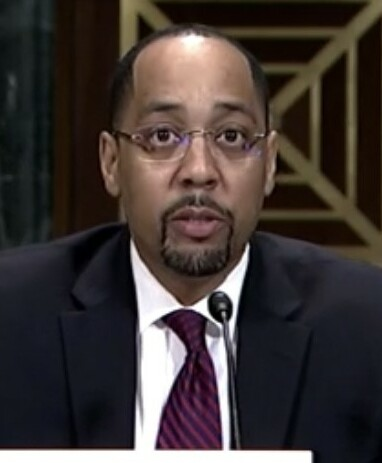

Judge of the United States District Court for the Western District of Oklahoma
- Incumbent
- Assumed office December 31, 2019
- Appointed by: Donald Trump
- Preceded by: Joe L. Heaton

Magistrate Judge of the United States District Court for the Western District of Oklahoma
- In office July 31, 2015 – December 31, 2019

Personal details
- Born: Bernard Maurice Jones II; 1979 (age 46–47) Oklahoma City, Oklahoma, U.S.
- Education: Southern Methodist University (BA); University of Notre Dame (JD)

Bernard Maurice Jones II (born 1979) is a United States district judge of the United States District Court for the Western District of Oklahoma and a former magistrate judge of the same court.

== Early life and education ==
Jones was born and raised in Oklahoma City, and attended Bishop McGuinness Catholic High School. Jones earned his Bachelor of Arts from Southern Methodist University and his Juris Doctor from Notre Dame Law School.

== Career ==
Jones was in private practice, where he focused on commercial and labor and employment law, first at Porter Wright Morris & Arthur, LLP in Columbus, Ohio, and later in the Oklahoma City office of McAfee & Taft. He would later transition into higher education where he served as a member of the administrative faculty at Oklahoma City University School of the Law, becoming the first person of color to attain the rank of associate dean.

=== State court service ===
In 2012, he was appointed as a District Judge for Oklahoma County District Court, where he presided over the Family law and Domestic relations and Civil dockets and oversaw the District's Drug court and Mental health court programs.

A case Jones presided over drew national attention in 2014 when he ultimately denied a request by an Oklahoma school district to replay a high school football game that was allegedly botched by referees, noting that it was not up to the court to intervene in such a decision.

=== Federal judicial service ===
Jones was appointed as a United States magistrate judge in 2015, and was sworn into office on August 17, 2015. He was the first African American to be appointed to this position in the state of Oklahoma. His service as a magistrate judge was terminated on December 31, 2019 when he was elevated to district judge.

On October 2, 2019, President Donald Trump announced his intent to nominate Jones to serve as a United States district judge for the United States District Court for the Western District of Oklahoma. On October 17, 2019, his nomination was sent to the Senate. Jones was nominated to the seat vacated by Judge Joe L. Heaton, who assumed senior status on July 1, 2019. On October 30, 2019, a hearing on his nomination was held before the Senate Judiciary Committee. Oklahoma Senators James Lankford and Jim Inhofe released a statement supporting Jones' nomination. On November 21, 2019, his nomination was reported out of committee by a 19–3 vote. On December 18, 2019, the United States Senate invoked cloture on his nomination by a 88–5 vote. On December 19, 2019, his nomination was confirmed by a 91–3 vote. He received his judicial commission on December 31, 2019, becoming only the second African-American to receive a lifetime appointment to any Oklahoma federal district court.

== See also ==
- List of African-American federal judges
- List of African-American jurists

Legal offices
Preceded by Joe L. Heaton	Judge of the United States District Court for the Western District of Oklahoma; 2019–present	Incumbent
