= John Hazelton Cotteral =

American judge (1864–1933)

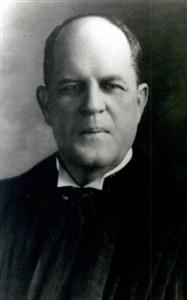

Judge of the United States Court of Appeals for the Tenth Circuit
- In office March 28, 1929 – April 22, 1933
- Appointed by: operation of law
- Preceded by: Seat established by 45 Stat. 1346
- Succeeded by: Sam G. Bratton

Judge of the United States Court of Appeals for the Eighth Circuit
- In office May 23, 1928 – March 28, 1929
- Appointed by: Calvin Coolidge
- Preceded by: Walter Henry Sanborn
- Succeeded by: Seat abolished

Judge of the United States District Court for the Western District of Oklahoma
- In office November 11, 1907 – May 23, 1928
- Appointed by: Theodore Roosevelt
- Preceded by: Seat established by 34 Stat. 267
- Succeeded by: Edgar Sullins Vaught

Personal details
- Born: John Hazelton Cotteral; September 26, 1864 Middletown, Indiana, U.S.
- Died: April 22, 1933 (aged 68)
- Education: Master's degree in law
- Alma mater: University of Michigan
- Occupation: Attorney; judge

John Hazelton Cotteral (September 26, 1864 – April 22, 1933) was a United States circuit judge of the United States Court of Appeals for the Eighth Circuit and the United States Court of Appeals for the Tenth Circuit and previously was a United States district judge of the United States District Court for the Western District of Oklahoma.

A native of Indiana, Cotteral attended the University of Michigan, where he studied law, then read law until 1885. He moved to Kansas, where he entered a private legal practice. He then met A. C. G. Bierer, and the two formed a partnership. In 1889, they joined the 1889 Land Run into what was then named as Oklahoma Territory, and settled in the city of Guthrie, which had been named the territorial capital. Their partnership dissolved when President Grover Cleveland appointed Bierer to the Oklahoma Territory Supreme Court

== Education and career ==
John Hazelton Cotteral was born on September 26, 1864, in Middletown, Indiana, to William W. Cotteral and Vorintha Burr. He was one of four children and in 1875 the family moved to Newcastle, Indiana after William Cotteral was elected county auditor. Cotteral attended the University of Michigan and read law in 1885. He entered private practice in Garden City, Kansas from 1885 to 1889, during which time he met and formed a partnership with A.C.G. Bierer, a native of Pennsylvania who had received a master's degree in law from Georgetown Law School in 1886, then moved to Garden City. Together, they decided to join the 1889 Land Run in the newly created Oklahoma Territory, which had just opened the Cherokee Strip for settlement by white settlers. Their business continued as private practice in Guthrie, Indian Territory (Oklahoma Territory from May 2, 1890, State of Oklahoma from November 16, 1907) starting in 1889.

== Federal judicial service in Oklahoma ==
The Bierer-Cotteral partnership effectively ended when President Grover Cleveland named Bierer as an Associate Justice on the Oklahoma Territory Supreme Court in 1896. Cotteral received a recess appointment from President Theodore Roosevelt on November 11, 1907, to the United States District Court for the Western District of Oklahoma, a new seat authorized by 34 Stat. 267. He was nominated to the same position by President Roosevelt on December 3, 1907. (Note: Frank Frantz, who became the last Territorial Governor of Oklahoma, had recommended Cotteral for the job to Roosevelt. The President promptly accepted the recommendation.) He was confirmed by the United States Senate on January 13, 1908, and received his commission the same day. His service terminated on May 23, 1928, due to his elevation to the Eighth Circuit.

Cotteral was nominated by President Calvin Coolidge on May 19, 1928, to a seat on the United States Court of Appeals for the Eighth Circuit vacated by Judge Walter Henry Sanborn. He was confirmed by the Senate on May 23, 1928, and received his commission the same day. Cotteral was reassigned by operation of law to the United States Court of Appeals for the Tenth Circuit on March 28, 1929, to a new seat authorized by 45 Stat. 1346. His service terminated when he died on April 22, 1933.

== Notes ==
Legal offices
| Preceded by Seat established by 34 Stat. 267 | Judge of the United States District Court for the Western District of Oklahoma; 1907–1928 | Succeeded by Edgar Sullins Vaught |
| Preceded by Walter Henry Sanborn | Judge of the United States Court of Appeals for the Eighth Circuit; 1928–1929 | Succeeded by Seat abolished |
| Preceded by Seat established by 45 Stat. 1346 | Judge of the United States Court of Appeals for the Tenth Circuit; 1929–1933 | Succeeded by Sam G. Bratton |
