= Lee Roy West =

American judge (1929–2020)

Senior Judge of the United States District Court for the Western District of Oklahoma
- In office November 26, 1994 – April 24, 2020

Chief Judge of the United States District Court for the Western District of Oklahoma
- In office 1993–1994
- Preceded by: Ralph Gordon Thompson
- Succeeded by: David Lynn Russell

Judge of the United States District Court for the Western District of Oklahoma
- In office November 2, 1979 – November 26, 1994
- Appointed by: Jimmy Carter
- Preceded by: Seat established by 92 Stat. 1629
- Succeeded by: Vicki Miles-LaGrange

Personal details
- Born: November 26, 1929 Clayton, Oklahoma
- Died: April 24, 2020 (aged 90) Muskogee, Oklahoma
- Education: University of Oklahoma (BA); University of Oklahoma College of Law (JD); Harvard Law School (LLM)

Lee Roy West (November 26, 1929 – April 24, 2020) was a United States district judge of the United States District Court for the Western District of Oklahoma.

== Education and career ==
Born in Clayton, Oklahoma, West received a Bachelor of Arts degree from the University of Oklahoma in 1952, and was a lieutenant in the United States Marine Corps during the Korean War, from 1952 to 1956 (in active service from 1952 to 1954). West received a Juris Doctor from the University of Oklahoma College of Law in 1956, and a Master of Laws from Harvard Law School in 1963. He was in private practice in Ada, Oklahoma, from 1956 to 1961 and from 1963 to 1965, serving on the faculty of the University of Oklahoma College of Law from 1961 to 1962, and as a Ford Foundation Fellow in law teaching at Harvard Law School from 1962 to 1963. West was an Oklahoma District Judge for the 22nd Judicial District from 1965 to 1973, and was a Special Justice of the Oklahoma Supreme Court and Court of Criminal Appeals from 1965 to 1973. He was a member of the Civil Aeronautics Board from 1973 to 1978, serving as acting chairman in 1977. He was in private practice in Tulsa, Oklahoma from 1978 to 1979. On January 23, 1994, Judge Wests daughter, Jennifer Lee West, shot her neighbor in the face with a 9mm pistol and later pled guilty before Oklahoma County District Judge Nancy Coats to a lesser charge of assault with a deadly weapon. She had been charged with assault with intent to kill.

== Federal judicial service ==
On September 28, 1979, West was nominated by President Jimmy Carter to a new seat on the United States District Court for the Western District of Oklahoma created by 92 Stat. 1629. He was confirmed by the United States Senate on October 31, 1979, and received his commission on November 2, 1979. He served as Chief Judge from 1993 to 1994, assuming senior status on November 26, 1994. He died on April 24, 2020, aged 90 in Muskogee, Oklahoma.

Legal offices
Preceded by Seat established by 92 Stat. 1629	Judge of the United States District Court for the Western District of Oklahoma; 1979–1994	Succeeded by Vicki Miles-LaGrange
Preceded by Ralph Gordon Thompson	Chief Judge of the United States District Court for the Western District of Oklahoma; 1993–1994	Succeeded by David Lynn Russell
