= Timothy D. DeGiusti =

American judge (born 1962)

Timothy DeGiusti

Judge of the United States Foreign Intelligence Surveillance Court
- Incumbent
- Assumed office May 19, 2023
- Appointed by: John Roberts
- Preceded by: Anne C. Conway

Chief Judge of the United States District Court for the Western District of Oklahoma
- In office July 1, 2019 – July 1, 2026
- Preceded by: Joe L. Heaton
- Succeeded by: Scott L. Palk

Judge of the United States District Court for the Western District of Oklahoma
- Incumbent
- Assumed office August 9, 2007
- Appointed by: George W. Bush
- Preceded by: Timothy D. Leonard

Personal details
- Born: March 3, 1962 (age 64) Oklahoma City, Oklahoma, U.S.
- Education: University of Oklahoma (BA, JD); Duke University (LLM)

Timothy D. DeGiusti (born March 3, 1962) is a United States district judge of the United States District Court for the Western District of Oklahoma as well as a judge of the United States Foreign Intelligence Surveillance Court.

== Education and career ==
DeGiusti was born in Oklahoma City and attended Douglas High School. His father was a first-generation Italian American who owned a floor installing business and his mother was a nurse. DeGiusti served as an officer in the Army National Guard/U.S. Army Reserve from 1981 to 2003, including as a military lawyer in the Judge Advocate General's Corps. He received a Bachelor of Arts degree from the University of Oklahoma in 1985 and a Juris Doctor from the University of Oklahoma College of Law in 1988. In 2018 he received a Master of Laws degree from Duke University Law School. He was in private practice in Oklahoma City from 1988 to 1990 and again from 1993 to 2007. He was a Trial counsel, U.S. Army, JAG Corps from 1990 to 1993. He was an adjunct professor of law at the University of Oklahoma College of Law from 1998 to 2003.

=== Federal judicial service ===
On February 15, 2007, DeGiusti was nominated by President George W. Bush to a seat on the United States District Court for the Western District of Oklahoma vacated by Judge Timothy D. Leonard. DeGiusti was confirmed by the United States Senate on August 3, 2007, and received his commission on August 9, 2007. He became chief judge on July 1, 2019.

=== Notable cases ===
In 2018, DeGiusti presided over the trial of former state Senator Ralph Shortey for soliciting a 17 year-old for sex at a hotel. Shorty pleaded guilty to one count of child sex trafficking in exchange for prosecutors dropping other charges, and DeGiusti sentenced him to 15 years in federal prison, followed by 10 years of supervised release.

== Sources ==
Legal offices
Preceded by Timothy D. Leonard	Judge of the United States District Court for the Western District of Oklahoma; 2007–present	Incumbent
Preceded by Joe L. Heaton	Chief Judge of the United States District Court for the Western District of Oklahoma; 2019–2026	Succeeded by Scott L. Palk
Preceded by Anne C. Conway	Judge of the United States Foreign Intelligence Surveillance Court; 2023–present	Incumbent
