= Stanley W. Alexander =

City Councilor for The Village, Oklahoma's Ward 3
- In office April 16, 2018 – May 2019
- Preceded by: Hutch Hibbard
- In office May 1985 – 2009
- In office 1971–1978

City Councilor for The Village, Oklahoma's Ward 5
- In office August 5, 2014 – May 4, 2015
- Preceded by: Jerry Broughton

Member of the Oklahoma House of Representatives from the 83rd district
- In office 1979–1981
- Preceded by: Kent Frates
- Succeeded by: Gean Atkinson

Personal details
- Born: Phillips, Texas, United States
- Party: Republican

Stanley Alexander is an American politician who represented the 83rd district in the Oklahoma House of Representatives from 1979 to 1981. He also served on the city council for The Village, Oklahoma from 1971 to 1978, 1985 to 2009, 2014 to 2015, and from 2018 to 2019.

== Biography ==
Stanley Alexander was born in Phillips, Texas. In 1971, he was elected to the city council for The Village, Oklahoma. He represented Ward 3. He left office in November 1978 when he was elected to the Oklahoma House of Representatives. As a member of the Republican Party, he represented the 83rd district from 1979 to 1981. He was preceded in office by Kent Frates and succeeded by Gean Atkinson.

He returned to the city council of The Village in May 1985 and served in office until 2009. After retiring from the council, he was twice appointed to fill a vacant seat. From August 5, 2014, to May 4, 2015, he represented Ward 5 after incumbent Jerry Broughton moved from the city. From April 16, 2018, to May 2019 he represented Ward 3 after incumbent Hutch Hibbard moved from the city.
