= Vicki Miles-LaGrange =

American judge (born 1953)

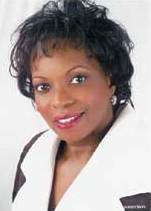

Senior Judge of the United States District Court for the Western District of Oklahoma
- Incumbent
- Assumed office November 5, 2018

Chief Judge of the United States District Court for the Western District of Oklahoma
- In office 2008–2015
- Preceded by: Robin J. Cauthron
- Succeeded by: Joe L. Heaton

Judge of the United States District Court for the Western District of Oklahoma
- In office November 28, 1994 – November 5, 2018
- Appointed by: Bill Clinton
- Preceded by: Lee Roy West
- Succeeded by: Jodi W. Dishman

United States Attorney for the Western District of Oklahoma
- In office 1993–1994
- President: Bill Clinton
- Preceded by: John B. Green (acting)
- Succeeded by: Rozia McKinney-Foster

Member of the Oklahoma Senate from the 48th district
- In office January 6, 1987 – September 1993
- Preceded by: E. Melvin Porter
- Succeeded by: Angela Monson

Personal details
- Born: Vicki Lynn Miles; September 30, 1953 (age 73) Oklahoma City, Oklahoma, U.S.
- Education: University of Ghana; Vassar College (AB); Howard University (JD)

Vicki Lynn Miles-LaGrange (née Miles; born September 30, 1953) is an inactive senior United States district judge of the United States District Court for the Western District of Oklahoma. She was the first African-American woman to be sworn in as United States Attorney for the Western District of Oklahoma. She was also the first African-American woman elected to the Oklahoma Senate.

== Early life and education ==
Born September 30, 1953, in Oklahoma City, Miles-LaGrange, received a certificate from the University of Ghana in Accra, Ghana, West Africa in 1973, and graduated cum laude from Vassar College with a Bachelor of Arts degree in 1974. In 1977, she received her Juris Doctor from Howard University School of Law in Washington, D.C., where she was an editor of The Howard Law Journal. As an honors graduate of Howard University School of Law, Washington, D.C., she served as an Editor of The Howard Law Journal while working part-time as a Congressional Intern for U.S. House Speaker Carl Albert.

== Career in government ==
Before 1977 she served as a legislative intern for Speaker of the House Carl Albert, a law clerk for district judge Luther L. Bohanon, a law clerk for the United States Commission on Civil Rights, and a law clerk for the law firm of Arnold & Porter. Miles-LaGrange served as a law clerk to Woodrow Bradley Seals of the United States District Court for the Southern District of Texas from 1977 to 1979.

She was a graduate fellow in the Criminal Division of the United States Department of Justice in Washington, D.C. from 1979 to 1980, and a special assistant to the African Development Group, Washington, D.C. from 1980 to 1981. She was, at the same time, a lecturer in the Women's Studies Program at the University of Maryland, College Park in 1981. From 1981 to 1982, she was a special assistant to the African Development Group in Washington, DC. She was a trial attorney of Office of Enforcement Operations, United States Department of Justice from 1982 to 1983.

She returned to Oklahoma to serve as an assistant district attorney for Oklahoma County from 1983 to 1986, where she prosecuted sex crimes. She then entered the private practice of law in Oklahoma City from 1986 to 1993, and was during that period an Oklahoma State Senator from 1987 to 1993, making her the first African-American woman elected to the Oklahoma State Senate along with Maxine Horner. She was the United States Attorney for the Western District of Oklahoma from 1993 to 1994.

=== Federal judicial service ===
Miles-LaGrange was nominated by President Bill Clinton on September 22, 1994, to a seat on the United States District Court for the Western District of Oklahoma vacated by Lee Roy West. She was confirmed by the United States Senate on October 7, 1994, and received her commission on November 28, 1994. She served as chief judge from 2008 to 2015. She took inactive senior status on November 5, 2018, meaning that while she remains a federal judge, she will no longer hear cases or participate in the business of the court.

=== Notable case ===
Miles-LaGrange's preliminary ruling enjoining amendment of the Oklahoma Constitution to prohibit the state's courts from either "considering or using" international law or Islamic Sharia law attracted considerable attention.

== See also ==
- List of African-American federal judges
- List of African-American jurists
- List of first women lawyers and judges in Oklahoma

Legal offices
Preceded by Lee Roy West	Judge of the United States District Court for the Western District of Oklahoma; 1994–2018	Succeeded by Jodi W. Dishman
Preceded by Robin J. Cauthron	Chief Judge of the United States District Court for the Western District of Oklahoma; 2008–2015	Succeeded by Joe L. Heaton
