= United States District Court for the Western District of Oklahoma =

United States federal district court in Oklahoma

Coordinates: 35.47158°N 97.51685°W

- (W.D. Okla.)
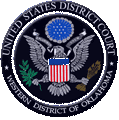
- Location: William J. Holloway Jr. U.S. Courthouse (Oklahoma City) More locations: Chickasha; Enid; Guthrie; Lawton; Mangum; Pauls Valley; Ponca City; Shawnee; Woodward
- Appeals to: Tenth Circuit
- Established: June 16, 1906
- Judges: 7
- Chief Judge: Scott L. Palk

Officers of the court
- U.S. Attorney: Robert J. Troester
- U.S. Marshal: Johnny Lee Kuhlman
- www.okwd.uscourts.gov

The United States District Court for the Western District of Oklahoma (in case citations, W.D. Okla. or W.D. Ok.) is a federal court in the Tenth Circuit (except for patent claims and claims against the U.S. government under the Tucker Act, which are appealed to the Federal Circuit).

The District was established on June 16, 1906, and became operational on November 16, 1907, with Oklahoma achieving statehood.

== Organization ==
The United States District Court for the Western District of Oklahoma is one of three federal judicial districts in Oklahoma. Court for the District is held at Lawton and Oklahoma City.

Enid and Ponca City Division comprises the following counties: Alfalfa, Garfield, Grant, Kay, Noble, and Payne.

Lawton and Mangum Division comprises the following counties: Beckham, Caddo, Comanche, Cotton, Greer, Harmon, Jackson, Jefferson, Kiowa, Stephens, Tillman, and Washita.

Oklahoma City, Guthrie, Chickasha, Pauls Valley, and Shawnee Division comprises the following counties: Blaine, Canadian, Cleveland, Garvin, Grady, Kingfisher, Lincoln, Logan, McClain, Oklahoma, and Pottawatomie.

Woodward Division comprises the following counties: Beaver, Cimarron, Custer, Dewey, Ellis, Harper, Major, Roger Mills, Texas, Woods, and Woodward.

The United States Attorney's Office for the Western District of Oklahoma represents the United States in civil and criminal litigation in the court. As of December 28, 2021 the United States attorney is Robert J. Troester.

== Current judges ==
As of July 1, 2026:

#	Title	Judge	Duty station	Born	Term of service			Appointed by
#	Title	Judge	Duty station	Born	Active	Chief	Senior	Appointed by
25	Chief Judge	Scott L. Palk	Oklahoma City	1967	2017–present	2026–present	—	Trump
24	District Judge	Timothy D. DeGiusti	Oklahoma City	1962	2007–present	2019–2026	—	G.W. Bush
26	District Judge	Charles Barnes Goodwin	Oklahoma City	1970	2018–present	—	—	Trump
27	District Judge	Patrick Wyrick	Oklahoma City	1981	2019–present	—	—	Trump
28	District Judge	Jodi W. Dishman	Oklahoma City	1979	2019–present	—	—	Trump
29	District Judge	Bernard M. Jones	Oklahoma City	1979	2019–present	—	—	Trump
30	District Judge	John F. Heil III (Note: Jointly appointed to the Eastern, Northern, and Western Districts of Oklahoma.)	none (Note: Judge Heil maintains chambers only in the Eastern and Northern Districts.)	1968	2020–present	—	—	Trump
14	Senior Judge	David Lynn Russell	Oklahoma City	1942	1981–2013 (Note: From 1981 to 1990, Judge Russell was jointly appointed to the Eastern, Northern, and Western Districts of Oklahoma.)	1994–2001	2013–present	Reagan
15	Senior Judge	Wayne Alley	inactive	1932	1985–1999	—	1999–present	Reagan
17	Senior Judge	Robin J. Cauthron	inactive	1950	1991–2015	2001–2008	2015–present	G.H.W. Bush
20	Senior Judge	Vicki Miles-LaGrange	inactive	1953	1994–2018	2008–2015	2018–present	Clinton
22	Senior Judge	Stephen P. Friot	Oklahoma City	1947	2001–2014	—	2014–present	G.W. Bush
23	Senior Judge	Joe L. Heaton	Oklahoma City	1951	2001–2019	2015–2019	2019–present	G.W. Bush

== Former judges ==
#	Judge	Born–died	Active service	Chief Judge	Senior status	Appointed by	Reason for termination
1	John Hazelton Cotteral	1864–1933	1907–1928 (Note: Recess appointment; formally nominated on December 3, 1907, confirmed by the United States Senate on January 13, 1908, and received commission the same day.)	—	—	T. Roosevelt	elevation
2	Edgar Sullins Vaught	1873–1959	1928–1956 (Note: Recess appointment; formally nominated on December 6, 1928, confirmed by the Senate on January 8, 1929, and received commission the same day.)	1949–1956	1956–1959	Coolidge	death
3	Alfred P. Murrah	1904–1975	1937–1940 (Note: Jointly appointed to the Eastern, Northern, and Western Districts of Oklahoma.)	—	—	F. Roosevelt	elevation
4	Bower Slack Broaddus	1888–1949	1940–1949	—	—	F. Roosevelt	death
5	Stephen Chandler Jr.	1899–1989	1943–1975	1956–1969	1975–1989	F. Roosevelt	death
6	William Robert Wallace	1886–1960	1950–1960	—	—	Truman	death
7	Ross Rizley	1892–1969	1956–1969	—	—	Eisenhower	death
8	Luther L. Bohanon	1902–2003	1961–1974	1969–1972	1974–2003	Kennedy	death
9	Frederick Alvin Daugherty	1914–2006	1961–1982 (Note: Recess appointment; formally nominated on January 15, 1962, confirmed by the Senate on February 7, 1962, and received commission on February 17, 1962. Jointly appointed to the Eastern, Northern, and Western Districts of Oklahoma.)	1972–1982	1982–2006	Kennedy	death
10	Luther Boyd Eubanks	1917–1996	1965–1986	1982–1986	1986–1987	L. Johnson	retirement
11	H. Dale Cook	1924–2008	1974–1992	—	1992–2008	Ford	death
12	Ralph Gordon Thompson	1934–present	1975–1999	1986–1993	1999–2007	Ford	retirement
13	Lee Roy West	1929–2020	1979–1994	1993–1994	1994–2020	Carter	death
16	Layn R. Phillips	1952–present	1987–1991	—	—	Reagan	resignation
18	Timothy D. Leonard	1940–2026	1992–2006	—	2006–2026	G.H.W. Bush	death
19	Michael Burrage	1950–present	1994–2001	—	—	Clinton	resignation
21	James H. Payne	1941–2025	2001–2017	—	2017–2025	G.W. Bush	death

== Chief judges ==
Chief judges have administrative responsibilities with respect to their district court. Unlike the Supreme Court, where one justice is specifically nominated to be chief, the office of chief judge rotates among the district court judges. To be chief, a judge must have been in active service on the court for at least one year, be under the age of 65, and have not previously served as chief judge.

A vacancy is filled by the judge highest in seniority among the group of qualified judges. The chief judge serves for a term of seven years, or until age 70, whichever occurs first. The age restrictions are waived if no members of the court would otherwise be qualified for the position.

When the office was created in 1948, the chief judge was the longest-serving judge who had not elected to retire, on what has since 1958 been known as senior status, or declined to serve as chief judge. After August 6, 1959, judges could not become or remain chief after turning 70 years old. The current rules have been in operation since October 1, 1982.

== Succession of seats ==
Seat 1
Seat established on November 16, 1907 by 34 Stat. 267
Cotteral	1907–1928
Vaught	1929–1956
Rizley	1956–1969
Seat abolished on March 4, 1969 (temporary judgeship expired)

Seat 2
Seat established on June 22, 1936 by 49 Stat. 1804 (concurrent with Eastern and Northern Districts)
Murrah	1937–1940
Broaddus	1940–1949
Wallace	1950–1960
Bohanon	1961–1974
Cook	1974–1992
Burrage	1994–2001
Payne	2001–2017
Heil III	2020–present

Seat 3
Seat established on May 24, 1940 by 54 Stat. 219 (temporary)
Seat made permanent on August 3, 1949 by 63 Stat. 493
Chandler, Jr.	1943–1975
Thompson	1975–1999
Heaton	2001–2019
Jones II	2019–present

Seat 4
Seat established on May 19, 1961 by 75 Stat. 80 (concurrent with Eastern and Northern Districts)
Daugherty	1961–1982
Seat reassigned solely to Western District on December 1, 1990 by 104 Stat. 5089
Russell	1981–2013
Wyrick	2019–present

Seat 5
Seat established on 1965 pursuant to 71 Stat. 586 (temporary)
Seat became permanent upon the abolition of Seat 1 on March 4, 1969
Eubanks	1965–1986
Phillips	1987–1991
Leonard	1992–2006
DeGiusti	2007–present

Seat 6
Seat established on October 20, 1978 by 92 Stat. 1629
West	1979–1994
Miles-LaGrange	1994–2018
Dishman	2019–present

Seat 7
Seat established on July 10, 1984 by 98 Stat. 333
Alley	1985–1999
Friot	2001–2014
Palk	2017–present

Seat 8
Seat established on December 1, 1990 by 104 Stat. 5089
Cauthron	1991–2015
Goodwin	2018–present

== See also ==
- Courts of Oklahoma
- List of current United States district judges
- List of United States federal courthouses in Oklahoma
