= Hall Estill =

American law firm in Tulsa, Oklahoma

- Headquarters: Tulsa
- No. of offices: 4
- No. of attorneys: 150
- Major practice areas: Antitrust, corporate, labor & employment, energy, oil & gas, intellectual property, litigation, Native American law, real estate, regulatory, restructuring/bankruptcy, and tax
- Date founded: 1966
- Company type: Professional corporation
- Website: www.hallestill.com

Hall Estill is an American law firm headquartered in Tulsa, Oklahoma with additional offices in Oklahoma City, Northwest Arkansas, and Denver, Colorado. Hall Estill ranks among the 400 largest U.S. law firms by domestic attorney headcount. In 2015, Law360 recognized Hall Estill for having the fourth-highest percentage of minority partners among America's large and mid-size law firms and named the firm as one of the "50 Best Firms for Minority Partners."

Hall Estill is currently headquartered in Santa Fe Square at 521 East 2nd Street, Suite 1200 in downtown Tulsa. The Oklahoma City office is located in BancFirst Tower

== History ==
In 1966, Harvard Law School graduate Walter Hall founded the firm now known as Hall Estill in response to a request for outside counsel made by the Tulsa-based Williams Companies (today a Fortune 500 energy company).

In 1980, Hall Estill attorneys represented defendant Worldwide Volkswagen in the landmark personal jurisdiction case World-Wide Volkswagen Corp v. Woodson, which was ultimately decided in the defendant's favor by the U.S. Supreme Court.

In 1996, Hall Estill partner Judith Colbert became the first minority woman partner of a large law firm in Oklahoma history.

In 2010, Hall Estill attorneys successfully defended noted author John Grisham in claims arising from his book The Innocent Man: Murder and Injustice in a Small Town, later turned into a Netflix documentary series. In 2014, Hall Estill represented country music singer Garth Brooks in a highly-publicized lawsuit in which Brooks challenged an Oklahoma hospital's use of what the court deemed to be a restricted donation.

In 2017, political scientist Adam Feldman identified Hall Estill as one of the four law firms that had appeared most frequently in front of recently-appointed U.S. Supreme Justice Neil Gorsuch during his time on the United States Court of Appeals for the Tenth Circuit.

=== Growth and expansion ===
Hall Estill opened its second office in 1986 in Oklahoma City. In 1997, Hall Estill opened its first Northwest Arkansas office in Fayetteville, Arkansas, staffed with attorneys lured away from the Rose Law Firm (where Hillary Clinton practiced). In 2016 Hall Estill opened its Denver office, initially focusing on oil and gas and transactional work.

Hall Estill has on occasion grown through mergers and acquisitions. In 2000, Hall Estill acquired Nichols Wolfe, a Tulsa corporate law firm founded in 1965. In 2018, Tulsa corporate and litigation law firm Newton, O'Connor, Turner & Ketchum merged with the larger Hall Estill.

== Notable attorneys and firm alumni ==
- William Bernhardt, author of best-selling legal thrillers
- Claire Eagan, Chief United States district judge of the United States District Court for the Northern District of Oklahoma and Judge for the United States Foreign Intelligence Surveillance Court
- John F. Heil III, United States district judge of the United States District Court for the Eastern District of Oklahoma, the United States District Court for the Northern District of Oklahoma, and the United States District Court for the Western District of Oklahoma
- John M. O'Connor, Attorney General of Oklahoma
- Ross Swimmer, former Principal Chief of the Cherokee Nation; Special Trustee for American Indians at the U.S. Department of the Interior
- Edward L. Weidenfeld, former member of the Council for the Administrative Conference of the United States and counsel to the Reagan-Bush Campaign; also served as U.S. counsel for the government of South Africa after Nelson Mandela's election
- Lee Roy West, Senior United States district judge of the United States District Court for the Western District of Oklahoma
- Ronald A. White, Chief United States district judge of the United States District Court for the Eastern District of Oklahoma
