= List of Native American jurists =

This is a dynamic list of Native Americans who are or were judges, magistrate judges, court commissioners, administrative law judges or tribal court judges. If known, it will be listed if a judge has served on multiple courts and their tribal membership.

Judge	Court/agency and years of service (if known)	State/territory	Status
Abby Abinanti (Yurok)	San Francisco Superior Court (Commissioner: c. 1990–2011; 2014–2015); Yurok Tribal Court (1997–present; Chief Judge: 2007–present)	California	active
Dawn Baum (Menominee)	Yurok Tribal Court (appt. 2017–2023)	California	deceased
Jessica R. Bear (Meshwaki Nation)	Meskwaki Nation Tribal Court (2007–2013; Chief Judge: 2013–present)	Iowa	active
Jennifer D. Benally (Navajo)	District Court for the Navajo Nation (1984–1995)	Arizona	deceased
Robert A. Blaeser (Anishinaabe)	Fourth Judicial District-Hennepin County (1995–2012)	Minnesota	retired
Evelyne Bradley (Navajo)	Kayenta Judicial Court (1998–2014)	Arizona	active
Leo Brisbois (White Earth Band of Ojibwe)	United States District Court for the District of Minnesota (Magistrate Judge) (2010–present)	Minnesota	active
Sandy Dexter Brooks (Lumbee)	Robeson County Superior Court	North Carolina	deceased
Ada E. Brown (Choctaw Nation)	Fifth Court of Appeals of Texas (2013–2019); United States District Court for the Northern District of Texas (2019–present)	Texas	active
Michelle Brown-Yazzie (Navajo Nation)	Mescalero Apache Tribal Court (2011–present; Brown-Yazzie has served as a Chief Judge)	New Mexico	active
Michael Burrage (Choctaw Nation of Oklahoma)	United States District Court for the Eastern District of Oklahoma/United States District Court for the Northern District of Oklahoma/United States District Court for the Western District of Oklahoma (1994–2001; Chief Judge: 1996–2001)	Oklahoma	resigned
Brooke Locklear Clark (Lumbee)	Robeson County District Court (2018–present)	North Carolina	active
Chantel Cloud (Southern Ute)	Southern Ute Tribal Court (2013–2018)	Colorado	inactive
Charles Cloud (Cherokee Nation)	Norfolk General District Court	Virginia	retired
Shirley Cogswell (Passamaquoddy)	Pleasant Point – Passamaquoddy Tribal Court	Maine	deceased
Walter Echo-Hawk (Pawnee)	Supreme Court of the Pawnee Nation	Oklahoma	active
Eldena Bear Don’t Walk (Confederated Salish and Kootenai Tribes)	Chief Justice of the Crow Tribe (2007–2011)	Montana	inactive
Fred W. Gabourie (Seneca people)	Los Angeles County Municipal Court (appointed 1976)	California	retired
Carrie Garrow (Akwesasne)	St. Regis Mohawk Tribal Court	New York	active
Tina Glory-Jordan (Cherokee)	Cherokee Nation Supreme Court Justice (2023–present)	Oklahoma	active
Lydia Griggsby	United States Court of Federal Claims (2014–2021); United States District Court for the District of Maryland (2021–present)	Maryland	active
Keith Harper (Cherokee Nation of Oklahoma)	Mashantucket Pequot Tribe's Appellate Court (2001–2007); Supreme Court of the Poarch Band of Creek Indians (2007–2008)	Montana	inactive
P.J. Herne (Akwesasne)	St. Regis Mohawk Tribal Court (Chief Judge: appt. 2008)	New York	inactive
Sara E. Hill	United States District Court for the Northern District of Oklahoma (2023–present)	Oklahoma	active
Gilbert Horn Sr. (Assiniboine)	Fort Belknap Tribal Juvenile Court	Montana	deceased
Diane Humetewa (Hopi)	Hopi Appellate Court (2002–2007); United States District Court for the District of Arizona (2014–present)	Arizona	active
Joey Jayne (Navajo)	Justice of the Peace in Lake and Sanders Counties (2012–2014)	Montana	resigned
William Bluehouse Johnson (Pueblo of Isleta)	Isleta Pueblo Appellate Court	New Mexico	active
William D. Johnson (Confederated Tribes of the Umatilla Indian Reservation)	Umatilla Tribal Court (1980–present; Chief Judge: 1988–present)	Oregon	active
B.J. Jones	Chief Judge of the Sisseton-Wahpeton Oyate Court, Chief Judge of the Prairie Island Indian Community Court, Chief Justice of the Turtle Mountain Tribal Court of Appeals, Special Magistrate of the Non-Removable Mille Lacs Band of Ojibwe Tribal Court, Associate Judge for the Fort Berthold District Court, Associate Judge for the Standing Rock Sioux Tribal Court, Associate Justice for the Oglala Sioux Tribal Court and the Flandreau-Santee Sioux Tribal Courts, Deputy Judge for the Leech Lake Band of Ojibwe	North Dakota	inactive
Lauren J. King (Muscogee (Creek) Nation)	Northwest Intertribal Court System (2013–2021); United States District Court for the Western District of Washington (2021–present)	Washington	active
Gary Larance (Hopi)	Bishop Paiute Tribe Court (2020–present)	California	active
Stacy Leeds (Cherokee)	Cherokee Nation Supreme Court Justice (2002–2006)	Oklahoma	retired
Ira Left Hand Sr. (Crow)	Tribal Court of the Crow Indian Reservation (c. 1980)	Montana	deceased
Patricia Lenzi (St. Regis Mohawk Tribe)	Court of Appeals, St. Regis Mohawk Tribe (2012– ; Chief Judge: 2020)	California	active
Brad Letts (Cherokee)	North Carolina 30th Judicial District Court (2000–2019)	North Carolina	retired
Gilbert M. Lopez	Los Angeles County Superior Court (2001–2020)	California	retired
Phil Lujan (Kiowa)	Citizen Potawatomi Nation Judge	Oklahoma	active
Merwin Lynch (Navajo)	Puerco District of Apache County (Justice of the Peace); Navajo Nation Supreme Court	Arizona	deceased
Kelly K.E. Mahoney (Chickasaw Nation of Oklahoma)	United States District Court for the Northern District of Iowa (2016–present)	Iowa	active
Allie Greenleaf Maldonado (Little Traverse Bay Bands of Odawa Indians)	Michigan Court of Appeals (2023–present)	Michigan	active
John Manydeeds (Standing Rock Sioux)	Eau Claire County Court (2016–present)	Wisconsin	active
Joshua D. Malcolm (Lumbee)	Chief Justice, Supreme Court of the Lumbee Tribe of North Carolina (2017–present)	North Carolina	active
John Martin (Cherokee)	Supreme Court of the Cherokee Nation (c. 1820s)	Tennessee	deceased
Lacy Maynor (Lumbee)	Maxton Recorder's Court (c. 1950s)	North Carolina	deceased
Angelica Chavis McIntyre (Lumbee)	Robeson County District Court (2018–present)	North Carolina	active
Anne McKeig (White Earth Band of Ojibwe)	Minnesota Fourth District Court (2008–2016); Minnesota Supreme Court (2016–present)	Minnesota	active
Robert Medina (Zia Pueblo)	Pueblo of Isleta Tribal Court & Justice; Southwest Intertribal Court of Appeals	New Mexico	active
Arvo Mikkanen (Comanche/Kiowa)	Court of Indian Offenses for the Anadarko Area Tribes (1988–1994); Supreme Court of the Cheyenne Arapaho Tribes (1991–1994).	Oklahoma	inactive
Andrea Miller	12th Judicial District Court (2017– )	Nebraska	active
Mark A. Montour (St. Regis Mohawk)	New York State Supreme Court (2013–present)	New York	active
Raquel Montoya-Lewis (Pueblo of Laguna)	Whatcom County Superior Court (2015–2020); Washington Supreme Court (2020–present)	Washington	active
Debra O’Gara (Tlingit)	Central Council of Tlingit and Haida Indian Tribes of Alaska (CCTHITA) Tribal Court (2007–present)	Alaska	active
Richard Osburn (Cherokee Nation)	Mille Lacs Band Tribal Court (2008–2014)	Minnesota	inactive
Patricia Paul (Iñupiat)	Confederated Tribes of Grand Ronde Tribal Court	Oregon	active
Mary Peltola (Yup'ik)	Orutsararmiut Native Council Tribal Court (2020–2021)	Alaska	retired
James Phillips (Cherokee)	Grays Harbor County Superior Court (1929–1950)	Washington	deceased
Joseph Plumer (Leech Lake Band of Chippewa Indians)	Meskwaki Nation Tribal Court (2005–present; Plumer has served as a Chief Judge)	Iowa	active
David Raasch (Stockbridge-Munsee Band of Mohican Indians)	Stockbridge Munsee Tribal Court (elected in 2009)	Wisconsin	inactive
Angela R. Riley (Citizen Potawatomi Nation)	Citizen Potawatomi Nation Supreme Court (2003–2010; Chief Justice: 2010–present)	Oklahoma	active
Cecilia M. Romero (Saginaw Chippewa)	United States District Court for the District of Utah (Magistrate Judge: 2019–present)	Utah	active
Dustin Rowe (Chickasaw)	Chickasaw Nation District Court (2005–2019); Oklahoma Supreme Court (2019–present)	Oklahoma	active
Steve Russell (Cherokee)	Austin Municipal Court (1978–1982); Travis County Court of Law No. 2 (1982–1995)	Texas	retired
Deborah L. Sanchez (Chumash)	Los Angeles County Superior Court (2006–present)	California	active
Frank Howell Seay (Cherokee)	United States District Court for the Eastern District of Oklahoma (1979–2026)	Oklahoma	deceased
Debra Shopteese (Sac and Fox Nation)	Massachusetts State District Court (2011–present)	Massachusetts	active
Barbara Smith (Chickasaw Nation)	District Court Judge for the Chickasaw Nation; Supreme Court of the Chickasaw Nation	Oklahoma	deceased
Terri Smith (Northern Arapaho Tribe)	Wind River Indian Reservation Tribal Court	Wyoming	resigned
George W. Soule (White Earth Nation)	White Earth Band of Ojibwe and Prairie Island Indian Community Court of Appeals	Minnesota	active
Melvin R. Stoof (Rosebud Sioux Tribe)	Pascua Yaqui Trial Court (2004–present)	Arizona	active
Sunshine Sykes (Navajo)	Riverside County Superior Court (2013–2022); United States District Court for the Central District of California (2022– )	California	active
William A. Thorne, Jr. (Pomo)	Utah Court of Appeals (1986–2013)	Utah	retired
Jill E. Tompkins (Penobscot)	Pokagon Band of Potawatomi Court of Appeals (2002)	Maine	active
Margaret Seelye Treuer (Ojibwe)	Bois Forte Tribal Court; Leach Lake Tribal Court; United States District Court of Minnesota (U.S. Magistrate)	Minnesota	deceased
Rebecca Tsosie (Yaqui)	San Carlos Apache Court of Appeals (2007–2024); Fort McDowell Yavapai Nation Supreme Court (2008–present)	Arizona	active
Carol Jean Vigil (Pueblo)	New Mexico 1st Judicial District Judge (1998–2005)	New Mexico	deceased
Philip Viles (Cherokee)	Supreme Court of the Cherokee Nation (1976–2002; Viles served as Chief Justice during his tenure); Supreme Court of Georgia (Sitting judge: 1993)	Oklahoma	retired
Korey Wahwassuck (Cree)	Leech Lake Band of Ojibwe Tribal Court; Minnesota Ninth Judicial District	Minnesota	active
Sarah Wheelock (Meskwaki)	Minnesota Court of Appeals (2021– )	Minnesota	active
Claudette C. White (Quechan Indian Tribe)	San Manuel Tribal Court (Chief Judge: 2018–2021)	California	deceased
Ronald J. Whitener (Squaxin Island Tribe)	Northwest Intertribal Court of Appeals; Chehalis Tribal Court of Appeals; Upper Skagit Tribal Court of Appeals	Washington	active
Samuel Winder (Southern Ute)	New Mexico Second Judicial District Court (2011–present)	New Mexico	active
Joseph J. Wiseman	Northern California Intertribal Court; Court of Appeals, Round Valley Indian Tribes	California	active

== Other topics of interest ==
- List of African-American jurists
- List of Asian American jurists
- List of Hispanic and Latino American jurists
- List of Jewish American jurists
- List of LGBT jurists in the United States
- List of first women lawyers and judges in the United States
- List of first minority male lawyers and judges in the United States
