= Ed Edmondson United States Courthouse =

- United States Post Office and Courthouse
- U.S. National Register of Historic Places
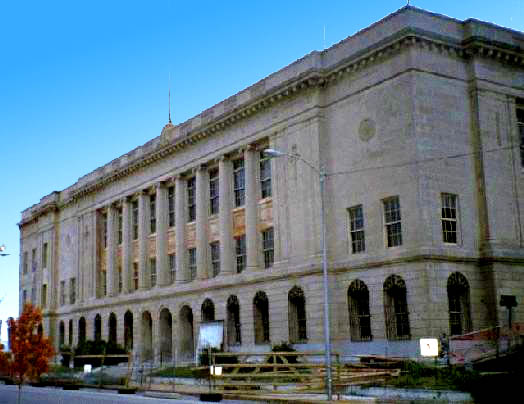

- Location within Oklahoma Location within the United States
- Location: 101 N. 5th St., Muskogee, Oklahoma
- Coordinates: 35°44′58″N 95°22′31″W
- Area: less than one acre
- Built: 1915
- Architect: James Knox Taylor
- Architectural style: Classical Revival
- NRHP reference No.: 00000246
- Added to NRHP: March 24, 2000

The Ed Edmondson United States Courthouse, previously called the Muskogee Federal Building- United States Courthouse, is a historic government building in Muskogee, Oklahoma. It was built in 1915 as a post office and federal courthouse. Although it is no longer used as a post office, it is currently in use by several government offices, including the U.S. Marshals and U.S. Probation Office as well as the United States District Court for the Eastern District of Oklahoma.

The building was listed on the National Register of Historic Places in 2000 as the United States Post Office and Courthouse. It was named in honor of former U.S. Congressman Ed Edmondson in 2003.

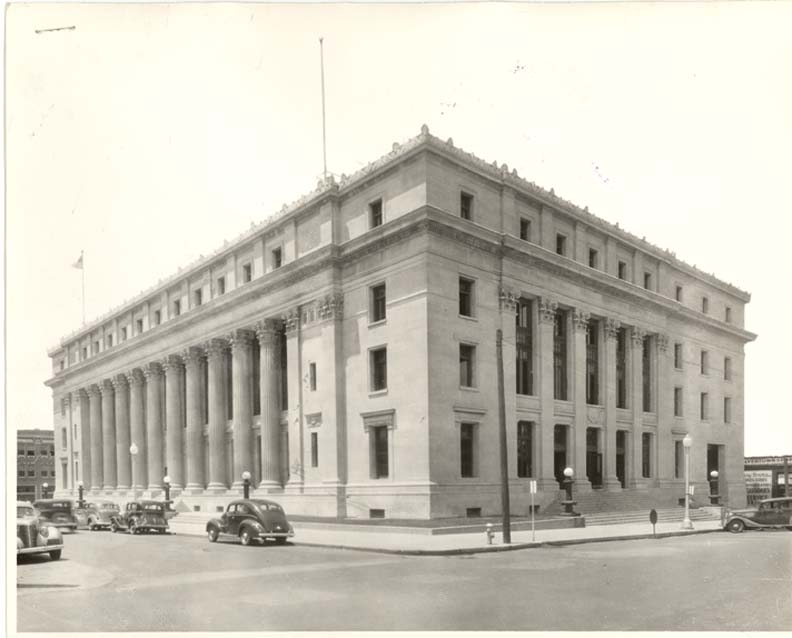
Circa 1938

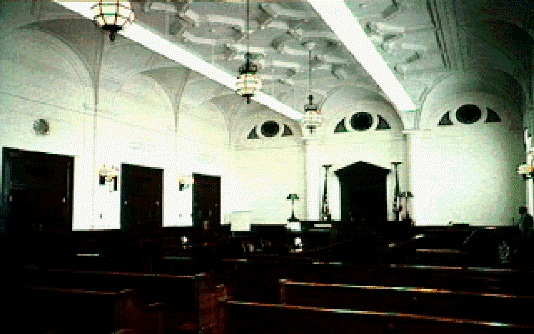
Courtroom

== History ==
The federal building was constructed on a site that was occupied by five simple wood-frame houses on the western edge of the center of town adjacent to several churches and hotels of quality architecture. The building was constructed (completed in 1915) shortly after the statehood in 1907 and prior to the construction of the U.S. Post Office and Federal Building in nearby Tulsa. When the building opened (public opening November 26, 1915), it was ". . . the most noted architectural achievement in the state." The construction cost $500,000 and the interior furnishings another $250,000. The building was designed as a United States Post Office and Courthouse (original name) and functioned as a complete federal center for the region. This included, in addition to the post office and court operations, general offices for the Internal Revenue, the Union Indian Agency, and Royalty among others. Judge Ralph E. Campbell presided over the first court session.

== Architectural description ==
=== Site ===
The building occupies the entire block between West Broadway and West Okmulgee Avenues and is bounded by Fifth Street on the front and an alley on the west. The building is set back with granolithic paving, granite steps, grass and shrubs fifteen feet from the sidewalk on three sides. The west (alley) side is developed for loading and vehicular access. The landscaping and steps are contained by a low concrete wall that connects stone pedestals which support cast iron lamps. In plan the original building was proportioned approximately 100 feel by 200 feet. The first level lobby was C-shaped and surrounded the post office workroom (since modified). Upper levels are organized around a loop corridor that circle an open lightwell.

=== Exterior ===
The facades of the building are composed with elements of both the Second Renaissance Revival and Neo Classical styles and were designed to be symmetrical about both axes. All four facades are clad with rectangular, buff colored Indiana Limestone. The building has a distinct Neo-Classic styling and composition unlike other federal buildings under James K. Taylor's supervision at the time, which were typically Second Renaissance or Beaux Arts styling. The first story is elevated on a base and approached by ceremonial steps in a classican manner on the three entry sides. The front elevation (east) is organized around a central three story decastyle of engaged (pseudo-peripteral) Corinthian columns which rise from the building base. Entry doors occupied the central three bays. The central column bays are flanked on each end by two pilasters which are in turn flanked by a narrow pavilion which is only slightly recessed. The columns and pillasters support a full terra cotta entablature and the fourth story which is topped by a cornice, also of terra cotta. Window and door openings are rectangular with classical ornamentation. A low sloping (not visible from the adjacent street corners) hipped roof (designed as a standing seam copper roof) rises to a peak at the interior lightwell. The brick lightwell is simply detailed with a corresponding cornice and belt cornice above the fifth story windows, and a plain capstone at the roof peak. The end elevations are designed similar to the front but are organized around five bays defined by pilasters rather that the engaged fluted columns. The original rear elevation was designed similar to the end elevations. Portions remain visible (part of the first floor, and fifth floor) and according to construction photographs (1937) much of the former wall may remain intact within the building. All the windows were rectangular wood casements and were typically paired and included transoms. The second and third floor windows within the central column bays on the north and the east are surrounded by a cast grillwork. There are carved stone panels bearing governmental seals above the entryways and on the flanking bays of the front facade at the fourth floor.

=== Interior ===
The interior spaces of prime historical significance are the grand marble lobby and stairways, the original courtroom (south side at second floor), and the 1937 courtroom (west side at second floor). The lobby as it currently exists has been severely compromised by the removal of much of the original, and ornate high quality material, and the infill of average office space at the north and south ends. The lobby is organized by the structural bays with the structural columns articulated as marble clad pilasters with ornamental plaster capitals. Beams are clad with ornamental plaster and define the bays of the coffered ornamental plaster ceiling and pendent lighting all of shuch is composed in the classic style. The center entry is flanked by two marble stairways with heavy carved wood balustrades that extend to the forth floor. The 1915 courtroom is a well proportioned two story room in very original condition. The Second Renaissance Revial design contraststo the lobby's classic styling having groin arched bays at the walls where the ornamental plaster is continued onto the design of the detailed ceiling. The courtroom features stained wood wainscot, built-in court furnishings, and cast bronze wall sconces. The 1937 courtroom, also two story, does not have the rich ornamental plaster but rather a longitudinal barrel vault. This courtroom has similar rich wood detailing and entries. Of secondary importance but of intrinsic historic value are the original corridors at levels 2–4, and public toilet rooms. The corridors have terrazzo flooring that is bordered with marble, plaster walls with marble base and ornamental plaster cornice moulding. Office entries from the corridor make extensive use of the relights use of relights with art glass, transoms, and stained wood moulding. Of the lightwell and corridor relight design the local newspaper lauded that "This will give ample light to every room, in fact each room in the building will have light both from the street and the inside of the corridors". The restrooms are finished similarly with marble partitions, wainscot, and stained wood partition doors. These spaces are largely intact except for the lowered acoustical ceilings.

=== 1937 addition ===
In 1937 the U.S. Treasury, with Louis A. Simon as supervising architect, designed the primary addition to the west side of the building. The addition provided covered loading and parking for the post office, added a courtroom on the second floor, and expanded the office space on each floor including the fifth, which was previously a storage area. The addition extended the building 32 feet to the west, changed the symmetry of the building, and reconfigured the west leg of the loop corridor to be double loaded rather than aligned with the lightwell. However, the original design was well respected by the use of the original details and high quality materials and has achieved historical significance in its own right. The original design was an important early use of steel frame construction. The frame was supported by brick and stone exterior walls and was entirely fireproofed with concrete which was also used for the floors and footings. Clay tiles were used as furring behind marble and ornamental plaster and for interior partitions.

Currently the building is utilized as a federal building and courthouse. The post office moved to an adjacent new one-story building in 1965. There are now three courtrooms (the third was added by GSA in 1982), court and district attorney offices, FBI, U.S. Marshals, BIA, and related offices.

== See also ==
- List of United States federal courthouses in Oklahoma
