= John F. Heil III =

American judge (born 1968)

John Heil
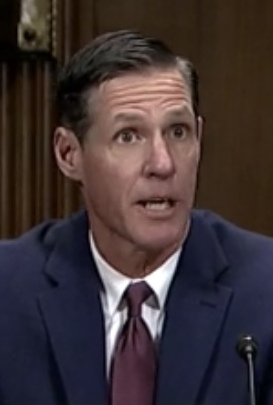

Chief Judge of the United States District Court for the Eastern District of Oklahoma
- Incumbent
- Assumed office January 27, 2026
- Preceded by: Ronald A. White

Chief Judge of the United States District Court for the Northern District of Oklahoma
- Incumbent
- Assumed office June 21, 2021
- Preceded by: John E. Dowdell

Judge of the United States District Court for the Eastern District of Oklahoma Judge of the United States District Court for the Northern District of Oklahoma Judge of the United States District Court for the Western District of Oklahoma
- Incumbent
- Assumed office May 27, 2020
- Appointed by: Donald Trump
- Preceded by: James H. Payne

Personal details
- Born: John Frederick Heil III; 1968 (age 57–58) Lima, Ohio, U.S.
- Education: Oklahoma State University (BS); University of Tulsa (JD)

John Frederick Heil III (born 1968) is an American lawyer from Oklahoma who is the chief United States district judge of the United States District Court for the Northern District of Oklahoma and United States District Court for the Eastern District of Oklahoma. In addition to his appointment to the Northern and Eastern Districts, he is also a judge in the United States District Court for the Western District of Oklahoma.

== Education ==
Heil earned his Bachelor of Science from Oklahoma State University and his Juris Doctor, with honors, from the University of Tulsa College of Law, where he served as an Editor for the Tulsa Law Journal.

== Career ==
Before joining Hall Estill, Heil served the State of Oklahoma as Assistant District Attorney in the Tulsa County District Attorney’s Office. From 2000 to 2020, he was a shareholder and director at Hall, Estill, Hardwick, Gable, Golden & Nelson in Tulsa, Oklahoma, where his practice focused on complex commercial litigation.

=== Federal judicial service ===
On November 6, 2019, President Donald Trump announced his intent to nominate Heil to serve as a United States district judge for the United States District Court for the Northern District of Oklahoma, United States District Court for the Western District of Oklahoma and United States District Court for the Eastern District of Oklahoma. On December 2, 2019, his nomination was sent to the Senate. President Trump nominated Heil to the seat vacated by Judge James H. Payne, who assumed senior status on August 1, 2017. On January 3, 2020, his nomination was returned to the President under Rule XXXI, Paragraph 6 of the United States Senate. On January 6, 2020, his renomination was sent to the Senate. A hearing on his nomination before the Senate Judiciary Committee was held on January 8, 2020. On March 12, 2020, his nomination was reported out of committee by a 16–5 vote. On May 20, 2020, the Senate invoked cloture on his nomination by a 76–16 vote. Later that same day, his nomination was confirmed by a 75–17 vote. He received his judicial commission on May 27, 2020. He has served as the chief judge of the Northern District of Oklahoma since 2021 and the Eastern District since 2026.

Legal offices
| Preceded by James H. Payne | Judge of the United States District Court for the Eastern District of Oklahoma; Judge of the United States District Court for the Northern District of Oklahoma; Judge of the United States District Court for the Western District of Oklahoma; 2020–present | Incumbent |
| Preceded by John E. Dowdell | Chief Judge of the United States District Court for the Northern District of Oklahoma; 2021–present | Incumbent |
| Preceded by Ronald A. White | Chief Judge of the United States District Court for the Eastern District of Oklahoma; 2026–present | Incumbent |
