= Michael Burrage =

American judge (born 1950)

Chief Judge of the United States District Court for the Eastern District of Oklahoma
- In office 1996 – March 1, 2001
- Preceded by: Frank Howell Seay
- Succeeded by: James H. Payne

Judge of the United States District Court for the Eastern District of Oklahoma Judge of the United States District Court for the Northern District of Oklahoma Judge of the United States District Court for the Western District of Oklahoma
- In office June 9, 1994 – March 1, 2001
- Appointed by: Bill Clinton
- Preceded by: H. Dale Cook
- Succeeded by: James H. Payne

Personal details
- Born: Billy Michael Burrage; June 9, 1950 (age 76) Durant, Oklahoma, U.S.
- Citizenship: American; Choctaw Nation
- Relations: Steve Burrage (brother)
- Children: Sean Burrage
- Education: Southeastern Oklahoma State University (BS); University of Oklahoma College of Law (JD)

Billy Michael Burrage (born June 9, 1950) is a Native American attorney and former United States district judge who served between 1994 and 2001.

A Choctaw Nation citizen born in Durant, Oklahoma, Burrage attended the Southeastern Oklahoma State University and University of Oklahoma College of Law before entering private practice in 1974. He was appointed to all three districts of the United States district courts for Oklahoma: the Eastern, Western and Northern in 1994 by President Bill Clinton. In 1996, he became Chief Judge of the Eastern District of Oklahoma, and served all three courts until his retirement in 2001.

After his federal retirement, he returned to private practice where he has represented clients such as the Choctaw Nation of Oklahoma, the University of Oklahoma, the State of Oklahoma, and billionaire Harold Hamm. He was inducted into the Oklahoma Hall of Fame in 2016.

== Education, family, and early career ==
Billy Michael Burrage was born on June 9, 1950, in Durant, Oklahoma. He is an enrolled member of the Choctaw Nation. He lived in Sherman, Texas until 7th grade when his parents divorced. Afterward he lived with his mother in Antlers, Oklahoma. Burrage's brother Steve is a former Oklahoma State Auditor and Inspector. Burrage's older son Sean served as a member of the Oklahoma Senate, and as the President of Southeastern Oklahoma State University in Durant, Oklahoma from 2014 to 2018.

He went to college at Southeastern Oklahoma State University, where he received a Bachelor of Science degree in 1971. He earned a Juris Doctor from University of Oklahoma College of Law in 1974. He went into private practice at the Stamper and Burrage law firm in Antlers, Oklahoma that year, working with them until 1994.

== Federal judicial service ==
Burrage served as a United States district judge for all three of the United States district courts in Oklahoma—Western, Northern, and Eastern. He was nominated by President Bill Clinton on March 9, 1994, to the seat vacated by H. Dale Cook. He was confirmed by the United States Senate on June 8, 1994, and received his commission on June 9, 1994. In 1996 Burrage became the Chief Judge of the Eastern District of Oklahoma, serving until his resignation from the court on March 1, 2001. He continued to serve the other two district courts as well.

Between 1999 and 2002, Burrage, his brothers Steve and David, and Steve's wife Roberta, became the sole owners of FirstBank of Oklahoma.

== Return to private practice ==
In 2001, Burrage returned to private law practice. He started The Burrage Law Firm with his younger son David and daughter-in-law Heather (née Hillburn) Burrage. In 2007, Burrage became a Managing Partner at a second law firm, the Whitten Burrage Law Firm.

In January 2015, Burrage represented billionaire Harold Hamm during his divorce case. In March, the University of Oklahoma hired Burrage to investigate the 2015 University of Oklahoma Sigma Alpha Epsilon racism incident. In 2016, he was inducted into the Oklahoma Hall of Fame.

In 2022, Burrage bought three condominiums in Fort Lauderdale, Florida for approximately $13.45 million. In February 2023, Attorney General of Oklahoma Gentner Drummond fired Whitten Burrage Law Firm from representing the state in opioid litigation. He alleged the firm had been paid $34 million to represent the case by former Attorney Generals Michael J. Hunter and John M. O'Connor. Hunter hired the firm in a no bid contract which Drummond had previously criticized as an "insider deal."

=== Choctaw Nation representation ===
In 2016, Burrage represented the Choctaw Nation in water settlement negotiations between the nation, Chickasaw Nation, and Oklahoma over Sardis Lake. As a representative of the Choctaw Nation, Burrage testified before the Senate Committee on Indian Affairs in 2022 that the nation should not be forced to admit Choctaw freedmen as citizens because doing so would interfere with tribal sovereignty.

== See also ==
- List of first minority male lawyers and judges in the United States
- List of Native American jurists

Legal offices
Preceded by H. Dale Cook	Judge of the United States District Court for the Eastern District of Oklahoma; Judge of the United States District Court for the Northern District of Oklahoma; Judge of the United States District Court for the Western District of Oklahoma; 1994–2001	Succeeded by James H. Payne
Preceded by Frank Howell Seay	Chief Judge of the United States District Court for the Eastern District of Oklahoma; 1996–2001	Succeeded by James H. Payne
