= Eugene Rice =

American judge

Senior Judge of the United States District Court for the Eastern District of Oklahoma
- In office December 1, 1963 – November 24, 1967

Chief Judge of the United States District Court for the Eastern District of Oklahoma
- In office 1949–1963
- Preceded by: Office established
- Succeeded by: Orville Edwin Langley

Judge of the United States District Court for the Eastern District of Oklahoma
- In office August 11, 1937 – December 1, 1963
- Appointed by: Franklin D. Roosevelt
- Preceded by: Robert L. Williams
- Succeeded by: Orville Edwin Langley

Personal details
- Born: Eugene Rice; February 21, 1891 Union City, Tennessee
- Died: November 24, 1967 (aged 76)
- Education: Union University (B.S.); Valparaiso University School of Law (LL.B.)

Eugene Rice (February 21, 1891 – November 24, 1967) was a United States district judge of the United States District Court for the Eastern District of Oklahoma.

== Education and career ==
Born in Union City, Tennessee, Rice received a Bachelor of Science degree from Hall-Moody College (now Union University) in 1910 and a Bachelor of Laws from Valparaiso University School of Law in 1917. He was in the United States Army from 1917 to 1919, where he became a quartermaster sergeant. He was an assistant county attorney of Stephens County, Oklahoma in 1920. He was a County Judge in Stephens County from 1920 to 1922. He was in private practice in Duncan, Oklahoma from 1922 to 1930. He was an Oklahoma State District Judge from 1930 to 1937.

== Federal judicial service ==
Rice was nominated by President Franklin D. Roosevelt on August 3, 1937, to a seat on the United States District Court for the Eastern District of Oklahoma vacated by Judge Robert L. Williams. He was confirmed by the United States Senate on August 10, 1937, and received his commission on August 11, 1937. He served as Chief Judge from 1949 to 1963. He was a member of the Judicial Conference of the United States in 1958. He assumed senior status on December 1, 1963. Rice served in that capacity until his death on November 24, 1967.

== Sources ==
Legal offices
Preceded by Robert L. Williams	Judge of the United States District Court for the Eastern District of Oklahoma; 1937–1963	Succeeded by Orville Edwin Langley
Preceded by Office established	Chief Judge of the United States District Court for the Eastern District of Oklahoma; 1949–1963	Succeeded by Orville Edwin Langley
