= Rebecca Tsosie =

American jurist

Academic background
- Education: University of California, Los Angeles

Academic work
- Discipline: Federal Indian law, Indigenous sovereignty, environmental justice, and bioethics
- Institutions: Arizona State University; University of Arizona

Rebecca Tsosie is an American jurist of Yaqui descent, specializing in Indian law, Indigenous sovereignty, and environmental justice. She became the Regents Professor and Morris K. Udall Professor of Law at the University of Arizona in 2022. Tsosie has served as an associate justice on the Fort McDowell Yavapai Nation Supreme Court since 2008. She was a judge on the San Carlos Apache Court of Appeals from 2007 to 2024.

== Life ==
Rebecca Tsosie, of Yaqui descent, grew up in Los Angeles, California. Her interest in Native American legal issues was sparked during the 1970s after learning about the Wounded Knee Occupation, a pivotal moment for the American Indian Movement. Tsosie attended the University of California, Los Angeles (UCLA), where she graduated cum laude with a Bachelor of Arts in American Indian Studies in 1987. She went on to earn her Juris Doctor from the UCLA School of Law in 1990. In 1993, she completed a President's Postdoctoral Fellowship at UCLA.

After graduating from law school, she began her legal career as a law clerk for an Arizona Supreme Court justice from 1990 to 1991, followed by work as a litigator. She began her academic career at the Sandra Day O’Connor College of Law at Arizona State University (ASU), initially as a visiting professor from 1993 to 1994. She became an associate professor of law in 1994 and was later promoted to full professor in 1998. From 1996 to 2011, she served as executive director of ASU's Indian Legal Program, transforming it into a nationally recognized center for Indian law education and advocacy. Tsosie was assisted in the development of ASU's Master of Laws degree in tribal law, policy, and government, and she played a role in establishing the Indian Legal Clinic. She has held various academic appointments, including the Willard H. Pedrick Distinguished Research Scholar and the Lincoln Professor of Native American Law and Ethics. In 2013, she was named a Regents' Professor at ASU, the university's highest faculty honor.

She joined the University of Arizona in 2022, where she holds the Morris K. Udall Professorship of Law at the James E. Rogers College of Law. Tsosie's research focuses on federal Indian law, Indigenous sovereignty, environmental justice, and bioethics. Tsosie has authoring over 40 law review articles and book chapters on issues related to Indigenous rights and governance. She contributed to landmark casebooks, including American Indian Law: Native Nations and the Federal System.

In addition to her academic work, Tsosie has served as an associate justice on the Fort McDowell Yavapai Nation Supreme Court since September 2008. She was a judge on the San Carlos Apache Court of Appeals from September 2007 to April 2024. She has held visiting professorships at institutions such as UCLA and the University of Hawaii, where she held the Daniel and Maggie Inouye Distinguished Chair in Democratic Ideals.

== See also ==
- List of Native American jurists
