= Frederick Alvin Daugherty =

American judge (1914–2006)

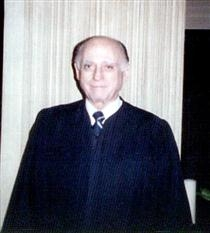

Senior Judge of the United States District Court for the Eastern District of Oklahoma Senior Judge of the United States District Court for the Northern District of Oklahoma Senior Judge of the United States District Court for the Western District of Oklahoma
- In office January 12, 1982 – April 7, 2006

Judge of the United States Foreign Intelligence Surveillance Court
- In office May 19, 1981 – May 18, 1988
- Appointed by: Warren Burger
- Preceded by: Lawrence W. Pierce
- Succeeded by: Joyce Hens Green

Chief Judge of the United States District Court for the Eastern District of Oklahoma
- In office 1973–1975
- Preceded by: Orville Edwin Langley
- Succeeded by: Joseph Wilson Morris

Chief Judge of the United States District Court for the Western District of Oklahoma
- In office 1972–1982
- Preceded by: Luther L. Bohanon
- Succeeded by: Luther Boyd Eubanks

Judge of the United States District Court for the Eastern District of Oklahoma Judge of the United States District Court for the Northern District of Oklahoma Judge of the United States District Court for the Western District of Oklahoma
- In office October 5, 1961 – January 12, 1982
- Appointed by: John F. Kennedy
- Preceded by: Seat established by 75 Stat. 80
- Succeeded by: David Lynn Russell

Personal details
- Born: Frederick Alvin Daugherty; August 18, 1914 Oklahoma City, Oklahoma, U.S.
- Died: April 7, 2006 (aged 91)
- Education: Cumberland School of Law (LL.B.)

Frederick Alvin Daugherty (August 18, 1914 – April 7, 2006) was a United States district judge of the United States District Court for the Eastern District of Oklahoma, the United States District Court for the Northern District of Oklahoma and the United States District Court for the Western District of Oklahoma.

== Education and career ==
Born in Oklahoma City, Oklahoma. Daugherty received a Bachelor of Laws from Cumberland University (now the Cumberland School of Law at Samford University) in 1933. He entered private practice of law in Oklahoma City from 1937 to 1940. He was in the United States Army as a Commanding Officer from 1940 to 1946. He was in private practice in Oklahoma City from 1946 to 1950. He was again in the United States Army as a Commanding Officer from 1950 to 1952. He was in private practice in Oklahoma City from 1952 to 1955. He was a Judge of the Seventh Judicial District Court of the State of Oklahoma from 1955 to 1961.

=== Federal judicial service ===
Daugherty received a recess appointment from President John F. Kennedy on October 5, 1961, to the United States District Court for the Eastern District of Oklahoma, the United States District Court for the Northern District of Oklahoma and the United States District Court for the Western District of Oklahoma, to a new joint seat created by 75 Stat. 80. He was nominated to the same seat by President Kennedy on January 15, 1962. He was confirmed by the United States Senate on February 7, 1962, and received his commission on February 17, 1962. He served as Chief Judge of the Western District from 1972 to 1982 and as Chief Judge of the Eastern District from 1973 to 1975. He assumed senior status on January 12, 1982. He served as a Judge of the Foreign Intelligence Surveillance Court from 1981 to 1988 and as a Judge of the Temporary Emergency Court of Appeals from 1982 to 1993. His service was terminated on April 7, 2006, due to his death.

== See also ==
- List of United States federal judges by longevity of service

== Sources ==
Legal offices
Preceded by Seat established by 75 Stat. 80	Judge of the United States District Court for the Eastern District of Oklahoma; Judge of the United States District Court for the Northern District of Oklahoma; Judge of the United States District Court for the Western District of Oklahoma; 1961–1982	Succeeded by David Lynn Russell
Preceded by Luther L. Bohanon	Chief Judge of the United States District Court for the Western District of Oklahoma; 1972–1982	Succeeded by Luther Boyd Eubanks
Preceded by Orville Edwin Langley	Chief Judge of the United States District Court for the Eastern District of Oklahoma; 1973–1975	Succeeded by Joseph Wilson Morris
Preceded by Lawrence W. Pierce	Judge of the United States Foreign Intelligence Surveillance Court; 1981–1988	Succeeded by Joyce Hens Green
