= Courts of Oklahoma =

Courts of Oklahoma include:

State courts of Oklahoma

- Oklahoma Supreme Court (civil)
- Oklahoma Court of Criminal Appeals (criminal)
  - Oklahoma Court of Civil Appeals
    - Oklahoma District Courts (26 judicial districts with 77 district courts)
    - Oklahoma Workers' Compensation Court

Federal courts located in Oklahoma

- United States District Court for the Eastern District of Oklahoma
- United States District Court for the Northern District of Oklahoma
- United States District Court for the Western District of Oklahoma

== See also ==
Judiciary of Oklahoma
