= Joseph Wilson Morris =

American judge (1922–2021)

Chief Judge of the United States District Court for the Eastern District of Oklahoma
- In office 1975–1978
- Preceded by: Frederick Alvin Daugherty
- Succeeded by: Frank Howell Seay

Judge of the United States District Court for the Eastern District of Oklahoma
- In office April 12, 1974 – July 31, 1978
- Appointed by: Richard Nixon
- Preceded by: Orville Edwin Langley
- Succeeded by: Frank Howell Seay

Personal details
- Born: Joseph Wilson Morris; April 28, 1922 Rice County, Kansas, U.S.
- Died: November 11, 2021 (aged 99) Tulsa, Oklahoma, U.S.
- Education: Washburn University (A.B.); Washburn University School of Law (LL.B.); University of Michigan Law School (LL.M., S.J.D.)

Joseph Wilson Morris (April 28, 1922 – November 11, 2021) was an American attorney, arbitrator, legal educator and United States district judge of the United States District Court for the Eastern District of Oklahoma. He was a partner in the Tulsa, Oklahoma law firm of Gable Gotwals.

== Early life and education ==
Morris was born in Rice County, Kansas on April 28, 1922. He graduated from Reno Community High School in Nickerson, Kansas. He received an Artium Baccalaureus degree in political science from Washburn University in 1943. He received a Bachelor of Laws from the Washburn University School of Law in 1947 graduating first in his class and Order of the Coif. He received a Master of Laws from the University of Michigan Law School in 1948. Morris received a Doctor of Juridical Science from the same institution in 1955. In 1942, while a student at Washburn, Morris was initiated into the Kansas Beta Chapter of Phi Delta Theta. Morris was admitted to practice law in Kansas in 1947, in Oklahoma in 1949 and in Texas in 1978.

== Legal career ==
Morris spent three years as an ensign in the United States Navy Reserve from 1943 to 1946. After receiving his Master of Laws he was a staff attorney with Shell Oil Company from 1948 to 1960. Subsequently, he was general counsel of Amerada Petroleum Corporation from 1960 to 1969. He was a vice president and associate general counsel for the Amerada Hess Corporation from 1969 to 1972. In 1972, Morris left Amerada Hess to serve as dean of the University of Tulsa College of Law from 1972 to 1974.

== Federal judicial service ==
Morris was nominated by President Richard Nixon on March 19, 1974, to a seat on the United States District Court for the Eastern District of Oklahoma vacated by Judge Orville Edwin Langley. He was confirmed by the United States Senate on April 5, 1974, and received his commission on April 12, 1974. He served as Chief Judge from 1975 to 1978. His service terminated on July 31, 1978, due to his resignation.

== Post judicial service ==
After he resigned from the federal bench, Morris became general counsel of the Shell Oil Company. He remained in that role until 1983 when he joined Gable Gotwals in Tulsa, Oklahoma. During the last 20 years, Morris has spent the majority of his time as an arbitrator in significant commercial arbitrations, both domestic and international.

== Professional and civic service ==
Morris was an adjunct professor at the University of Tulsa College of Law for over twenty years. He was president of the Tulsa County Bar Association in 1971. From 1977 to 1984 he was a member of the Board of Governors of the Washburn Law School. In 1983, he was chairman of the American Bar Association's Section of Natural Resources Law. He is a former vice chairman of the Board of Trustees of the Southwestern Legal Foundation and an emeritus member of the Rand Corporation's Board of Overseers of the Institute for Civil Justice. Morris was formerly a regent of the State of Oklahoma's high education system and is currently a trustee of the Sarkeys Foundation.

== Recognition and honors ==
In 1981 Washburn School of Law awarded Morris an honorary doctorate of laws. The Southwestern Legal Foundation awarded him the John Rogers Award in 1990. The Tulsa Historical Society inducted him into its Hall of Fame in 1991. This was followed in 1994 by Washburn University bestowing on him its Distinguished Service Award. In 2008 Washburn Law awarded Morris its Distinguished Alumni Award. At Washburn Law School, The Honorable Joseph W. Morris Endowment Fund recognizes his service to the legal profession.

== Personal life and death ==
Morris and his first wife, Deane Conklin Morris, had three children. Following the death of his first wife, he married Dona Frank in July 1989. He died in Tulsa on November 11, 2021, at the age of 99.

== Sources ==
Legal offices
Preceded by Orville Edwin Langley	Judge of the United States District Court for the Eastern District of Oklahoma; 1974–1978	Succeeded by Frank Howell Seay
Preceded by Frederick Alvin Daugherty	Chief Judge of the United States District Court for the Eastern District of Oklahoma; 1975–1978	Succeeded by Frank Howell Seay
