= Robert L. Williams =

American judge and politician (1868–1948)

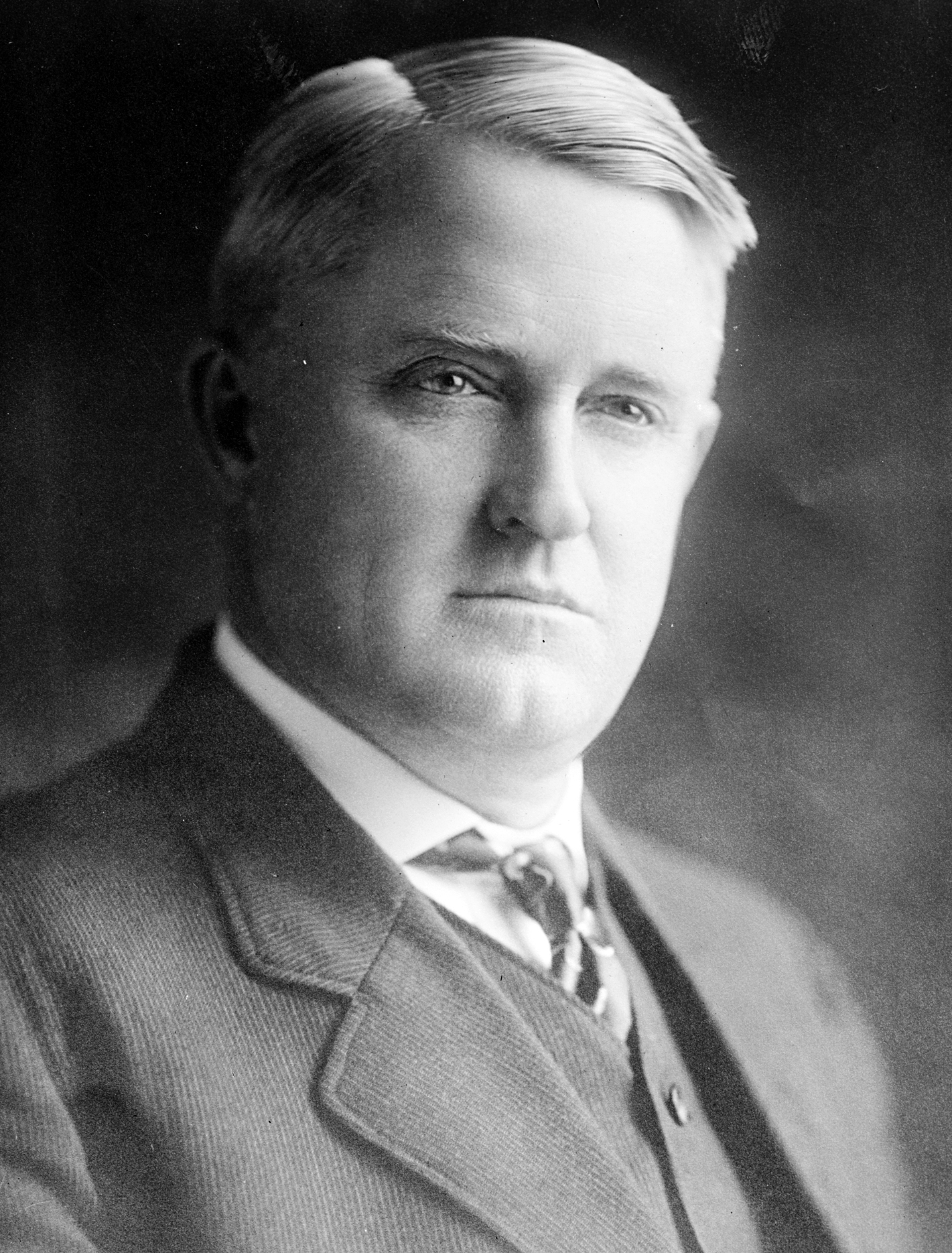
- Williams in 1914

Senior Judge of the United States Court of Appeals for the Tenth Circuit
- In office March 31, 1939 – April 10, 1948

Judge of the United States Court of Appeals for the Tenth Circuit
- In office April 21, 1937 – March 31, 1939
- Appointed by: Franklin D. Roosevelt
- Preceded by: George Thomas McDermott
- Succeeded by: Walter A. Huxman

Judge of the United States District Court for the Eastern District of Oklahoma
- In office January 7, 1919 – April 21, 1937
- Appointed by: Woodrow Wilson
- Preceded by: Ralph E. Campbell
- Succeeded by: Eugene Rice

3rd Governor of Oklahoma
- In office January 11, 1915 – January 13, 1919
- Lieutenant: Martin E. Trapp
- Preceded by: Lee Cruce
- Succeeded by: James B. A. Robertson

1st Chief Justice of Oklahoma
- In office 1907–1909
- Preceded by: Office established
- Succeeded by: Matthew John Kane

Member of the Oklahoma Supreme Court
- In office 1907–1914
- Preceded by: Office established
- Succeeded by: Stillwell H. Russell

Personal details
- Born: Robert Lee Williams; December 20, 1868 Brundidge, Alabama, U.S.
- Died: April 10, 1948 (aged 79) Durant, Oklahoma, U.S.
- Resting place: City Cemetery, Durant, Oklahoma
- Party: Democratic; Southern Democrat faction
- Education: Southern University (Greensboro, Alabama) (Bachelor of Arts, Master of Arts) read law

Robert Lee Williams (December 20, 1868 – April 10, 1948) was an American lawyer, judge, and the third governor of Oklahoma. Williams played a role in the drafting of the Oklahoma Constitution and served as the first Oklahoma Supreme Court chief justice. He also served as a United States circuit judge of the United States Court of Appeals for the Tenth Circuit and as a United States district judge of the United States District Court for the Eastern District of Oklahoma. As third Governor, Williams oversaw the state's response to the recent United States Supreme Court's ruling against Jim Crow laws and its involvement in the First World War (1914/1917-1918). He instituted the Oklahoma State Board of Affairs (later reorganized into the current Oklahoma Department of Central Services) which provided central purchasing services to various state departments, agencies, boards and bureaus. Due to his direct administrative role and concentration of power, Governor Williams counteracted the previous loss of executive power and disagreements with the Oklahoma Legislature under previous second Governor Lee Cruce (1863-1933, served 1911-1915).

== Early life and education ==
Williams was born on December 20, 1868, near Brundidge, (Pike County), Alabama. Williams earned a Bachelor of Arts academic degree in 1892 and a Master of Arts degree in 1894, both from the old Southern University, (founded 1856) then located in Greensboro, Alabama. (Note: Not to be confused with the present day historically black (HBCU) Southern University in Louisiana. Later the old Southern University consolidated in 1918 with the former Birmingham College (founded 1898) in Birmingham, Alabama to become the current Birmingham–Southern College.) currently still located in Greensboro, Alabama. One degree studied for by young Williams included a study of Methodist (Protestant / Christian) religious / theological doctrines, entitling him after graduation to become an ordained minister (elder / presbyter / pastor) in the old Methodist Church, if he so chose. He however also read law and passed the Alabama bar exam in 1891 at the age of 23 and began his practice in Troy, Alabama. At the age of 25, Williams, in 1893, moved west to the Cherokee Outlet section in the Indian Territory following its opening where he briefly practiced law in Orlando. After briefly moving back to Alabama, Williams returned to the Indian Territory shortly afterwards in 1897 and settled in Durant. He became increasingly involved in local politics and a driving force behind the Democratic Party in modern-day eastern Oklahoma in his earlier role as a member (National Committeeman) of the Democratic National Committee, representing the old Indian Territory in the political party's councils.

== Statehood convention delegate ==
Selected to represent Durant and the surrounding area at the Oklahoma Constitutional Convention, Williams traveled to Guthrie where he would meet two men that would have profound effects on both his and Oklahoma's future: Charles N. Haskell and William H. Murray. Through their labors, Oklahoma's Constitution was established and Oklahoma became a state on November 16, 1907. On that same day, Haskell was inaugurated as the first Governor of Oklahoma.

== Oklahoma Supreme Court Chief Justice ==
Through his friendship with Haskell and his own skill as an attorney, Williams was appointed by Haskell to the Oklahoma Supreme Court. Once on the Court, Williams was selected to serve as the Court's first chief justice. He was reappointed that post again in 1908 and would serve in that office until 1914, the only position he would hold on Oklahoma's highest court.

In 1914, before the end of Oklahoma's second governor's term, Governor Lee Cruce, Williams resigned from his position as chief justice in order to place his name in the Democratic primaries for Governor of Oklahoma. His fame as Chief Justice easily won him the Democratic nomination. Williams was fiercely conservative, possessed an assertive personality, and held a high sense of duty. Williams' Republican opponent was John Fields, the editor of a farm-related newspaper based in Oklahoma City. Williams faced a difficult fight for the governorship with Fields' paper granting him the majority of the farm-related voters' vote. Despite this Williams' popularity won him the victory by a narrow margin. He was inaugurated as the third Governor of Oklahoma on January 11, 1915.

== Governor of Oklahoma ==
On January 1, 1917, Williams officially moved into the new Oklahoma State Capitol in Oklahoma City, which had been under construction since June 1914, before it was completed and dedicated later that summer. On July 1 of that year the state officially took control of the building. The next year on March 18, 1918, the Oklahoma Legislature would hold its first sessions, meeting in the two elaborately decorated chambers of its new permanent home. Despite the state's adoption of the building, it was not actually really totally completed until two years later in 1919, because of wartime conditions and supply problems. Even upon its completion, it still lacked a crowning dome or tower. In 2000, Governor Frank Keating proposed that a dome be finally added. Two years after Governor Keating's proposal, the building was finally "completed" with the erection 85 years later of the originally envisioned dome (from architect Solomon Layton's plans and drawings) on November 16, 2002.

When Williams took office, Oklahoma was suffering terrible economic troubles. Hoping to save the state, he implemented policies that he believed would solve the problems and bring improvement. First, Williams proposed legislation levying new taxes while appropriations for various state institutions were decreased in order to reduce the state's budget deficit.

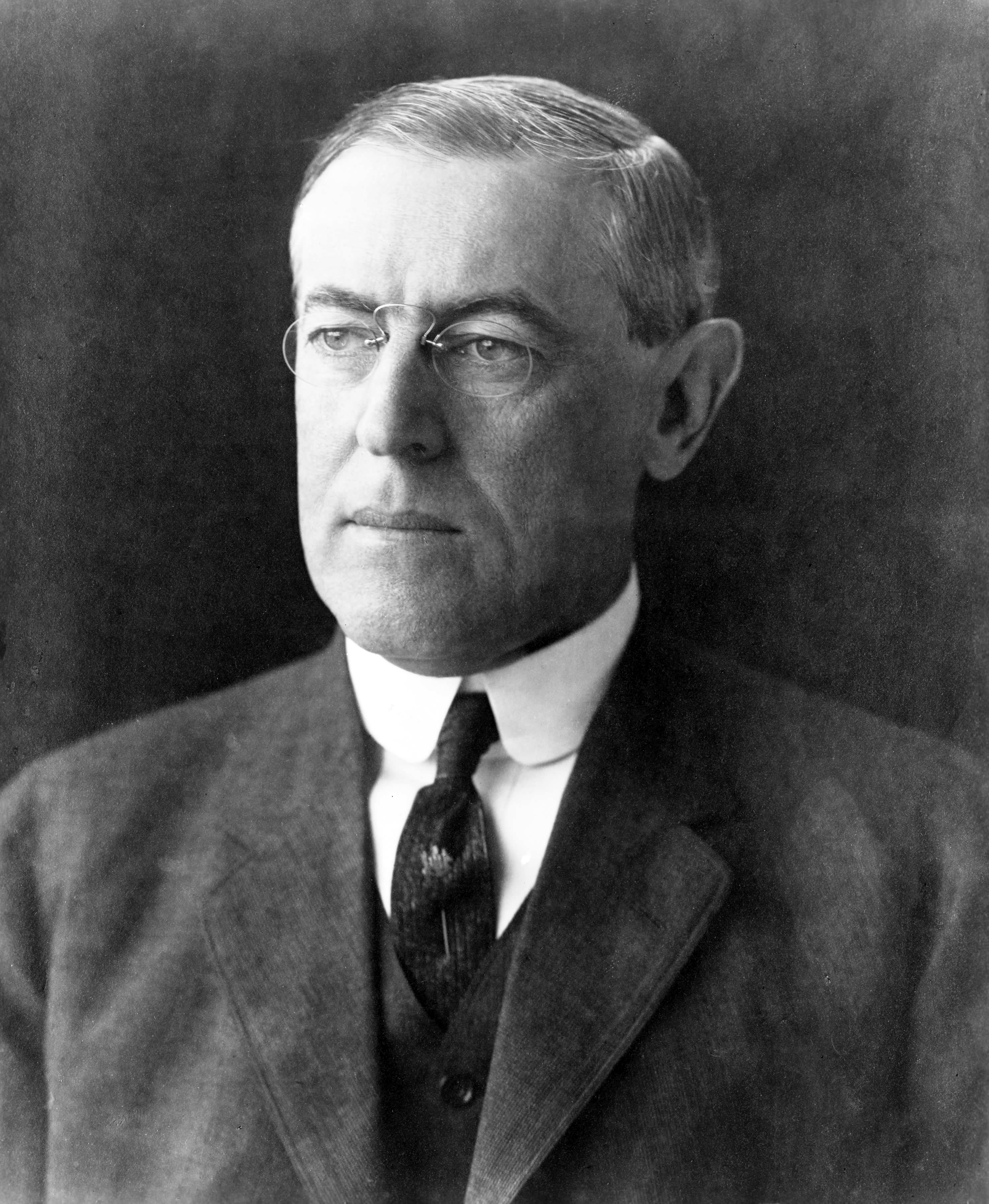
Oklahoma Governor Williams supported fellow Democrat and 28th President Woodrow Wilson (1856-1924, served 1913-1921), during World War I (1914/1917-1918). President Wilson was the first Democrat to be elected Chief Executive since Grover Cleveland in two decades, in 1884 and 1892, and before of James Buchanan way back in 1856. He would later appoint former Governor and state Chief Justice Williams as a federal judge of the United States District Court for the Eastern District of Oklahoma.

One of William's greatest advances in the state's economy came when he instituted the Oklahoma State Board of Affairs, (later reorganized into the current Oklahoma Department of Central Services) which provided central purchasing services to state agencies. The board's existence allowed for the consolidation of the purchasing of all of the numerous state departments, boards, commissions, and other agencies, and institutions. Williams influenced Oklahoma's budget by making appointments and setting salaries. Due to his direct administrative role and concentration of power, Williams would regain a measure of the executive power that previous second Governor Cruce's administration had lost.

William's main mindset throughout his administration was reform. Through legislative action and program policy changes, Oklahoma instituted a highway construction bill, a state insurance bond, the office of pardon and parole, and a State fiscal agency. Williams and state legislators amended the laws regarding the impeachment of state officials, provided for the aid of agriculture, created oil and gas divisions within the Oklahoma Corporation Commission, and changed the composition of the Oklahoma Supreme Court from six to add three more totalling nine justices, similar to the U.S. Supreme Court. Monetary support for confederate veterans, orphans and widows was also introduced, along with Mothers' pensions and several labor laws.

The Williams administration was marked by two events. The first was the landmark Supreme Court of the United States case Guinn v. United States in 1915. When state officials enforced Oklahoma's discriminatory Jim Crow laws, an appeal was made to the United States Supreme Court. When the court ruled that laws that "serve no rational purpose other than to disadvantage the right of African-American citizens to vote violated the Fifteenth Amendment," many state officials were subsequently indicted and sentenced for violation of federal election laws. This prompted Williams to call the state legislature into special session in 1916 to determine constitutional methods of black suffrage. They enacted a constitutional amendment that asked voters to approve a literary test in Oklahoma as a voting requirement. The proposal, however, was rejected by voters in a referendum, enabling many African-Americans in Oklahoma the right to vote for the first time.

The second major event in his gubernatorial term was when the United States was forced to deal with the approaching possible American involvement in the First World War (1914/1917-1918), in his first year of 1916. The Great War would cast its shadow over the remainder of the governor's term. Numerous domestic priorities were dropped in favor of the state's mobilization in preparation for overseas war. The Oklahoma military was swelled through the efforts of local draft boards that were quickly established, the maximum food production was encouraged to feed United States citizens, along with foreign overseas Allies, the promotion of fuel and food conservation was enacted, and Williams acted as a moderator between the pro-war and anti-war factions of the state's population.

By the time January 13, 1919 rolled around, Williams was uninterested in running again. Oklahoma had elected to replace him with James B. A. Robertson, whom Williams had earlier defeated in the previous 1914 Democratic primaries for governor.

== Federal judicial service ==
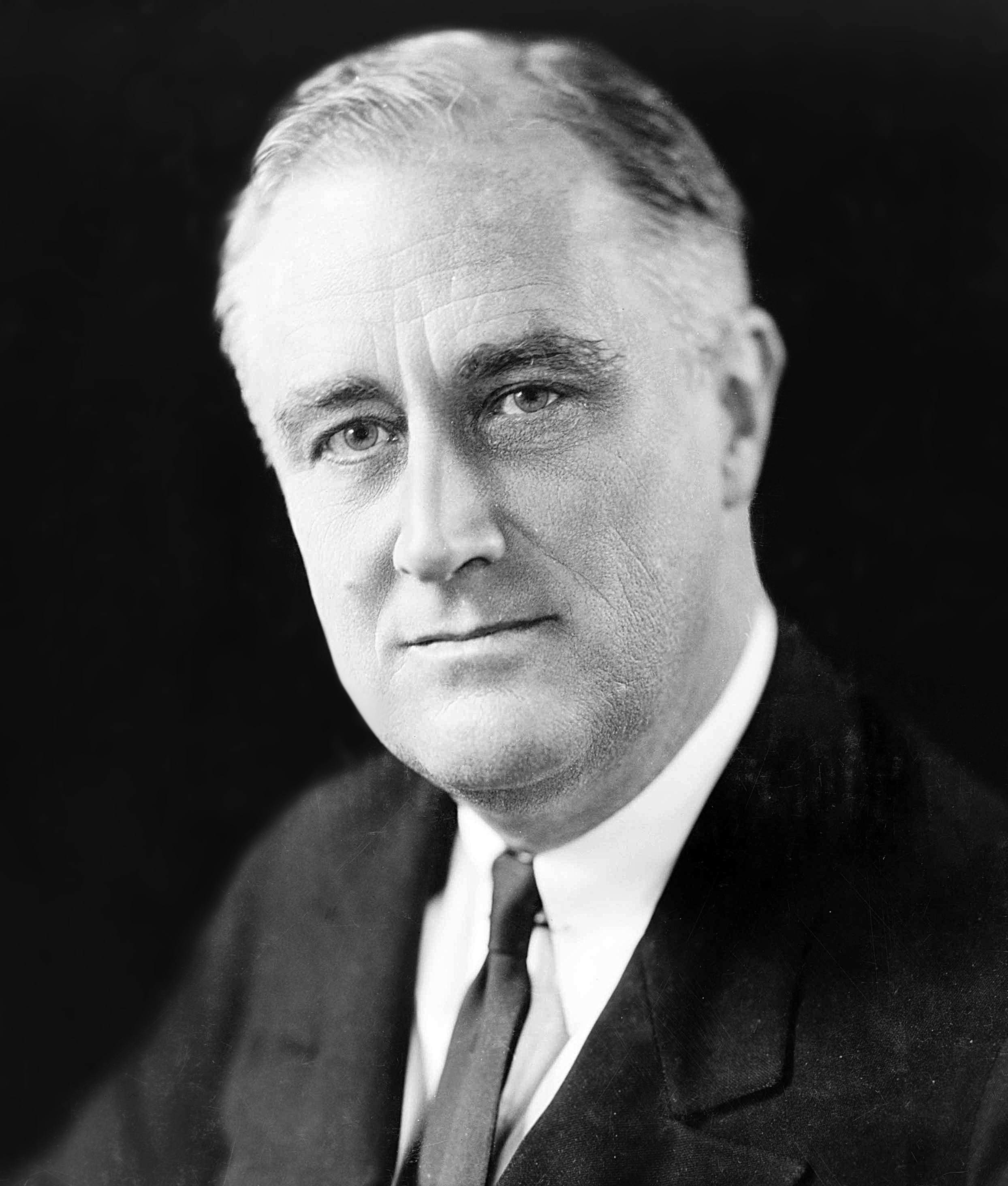
32nd President Franklin D. Roosevelt (1882-1945, served 1933-1945), appointed former state Chief Justice, Governor and U.S. District Court judge Williams to the higher level United States Court of Appeals for the Tenth Circuit.

Williams was nominated by President Woodrow Wilson on December 3, 1918, to a seat on the United States District Court for the Eastern District of Oklahoma being vacated by Judge Ralph E. Campbell (1867-1921, served 1907-1918), who was retiring. Judge Williams was confirmed by vote of the United States Senate on January 7, 1919, and received his commission the same day.

His service on that federal bench terminated 18 years later on April 21, 1937, due to his following nomination on March 25, 1937, and elevation to the higher level United States Court of Appeals for the Tenth Circuit, appointed by another fellow Democrat, 32nd President Franklin D. Roosevelt (1882-1945, served 1933-1945). He was filling the seat being vacated by the death of Judge George Thomas McDermott (1886-1937). Judge Williams was confirmed by the United States Senate on April 20, 1937, and received his commission the next day of April 21.

Two years later, he assumed senior status (semi-retirement) on the federal bench on March 31, 1939, with his service to the nation's judicial system ending nine years later on April 10, 1948, with his unfortunate death.

== Death ==
Williams died at his home in Durant, Oklahoma, on April 10, 1948, after a stay in Wilson N. Jones Hospital in Sherman, Texas. He is buried in City Cemetery in Durant.

== Electoral history ==
1907 Oklahoma Supreme Court District 2 election
Party	Candidate	Votes	%	±%
Democratic	Robert L. Williams	132,588	57.0	New
Republican	W. H. Johnston	99,728	42.9	New
Democratic gain from		Swing	N/A	

1908 Oklahoma Supreme Court 2nd district Democratic primary (August 4, 1908)
Party	Candidate	Votes	%
Democratic	Robert L. Williams (Incumbent)	9,442	100%

1908 Oklahoma Supreme Court 2nd district election
Party	Candidate	Votes	%
Democratic	Robert L. Williams (Incumbent)	122,100	100%
Democratic hold		Swing	N/A

== State of the State Speeches ==
- First State of State speech
- Second State of the State speech
- Third State of the State speech

== Note ==
Party political offices
Preceded by Lee Cruce	Democratic nominee for Governor of Oklahoma; 1914	Succeeded by James B. A. Robertson
Political offices
Preceded by Lee Cruce	Governor of Oklahoma; 1915–1919	Succeeded by James B. A. Robertson
Legal offices
Preceded by Ralph E. Campbell	Judge of the United States District Court for the Eastern District of Oklahoma; 1919–1937	Succeeded by Eugene Rice
Preceded by George Thomas McDermott	Judge of the United States Court of Appeals for the Tenth Circuit; 1937–1939	Succeeded by Walter A. Huxman
