= Sean Burrage =

American politician

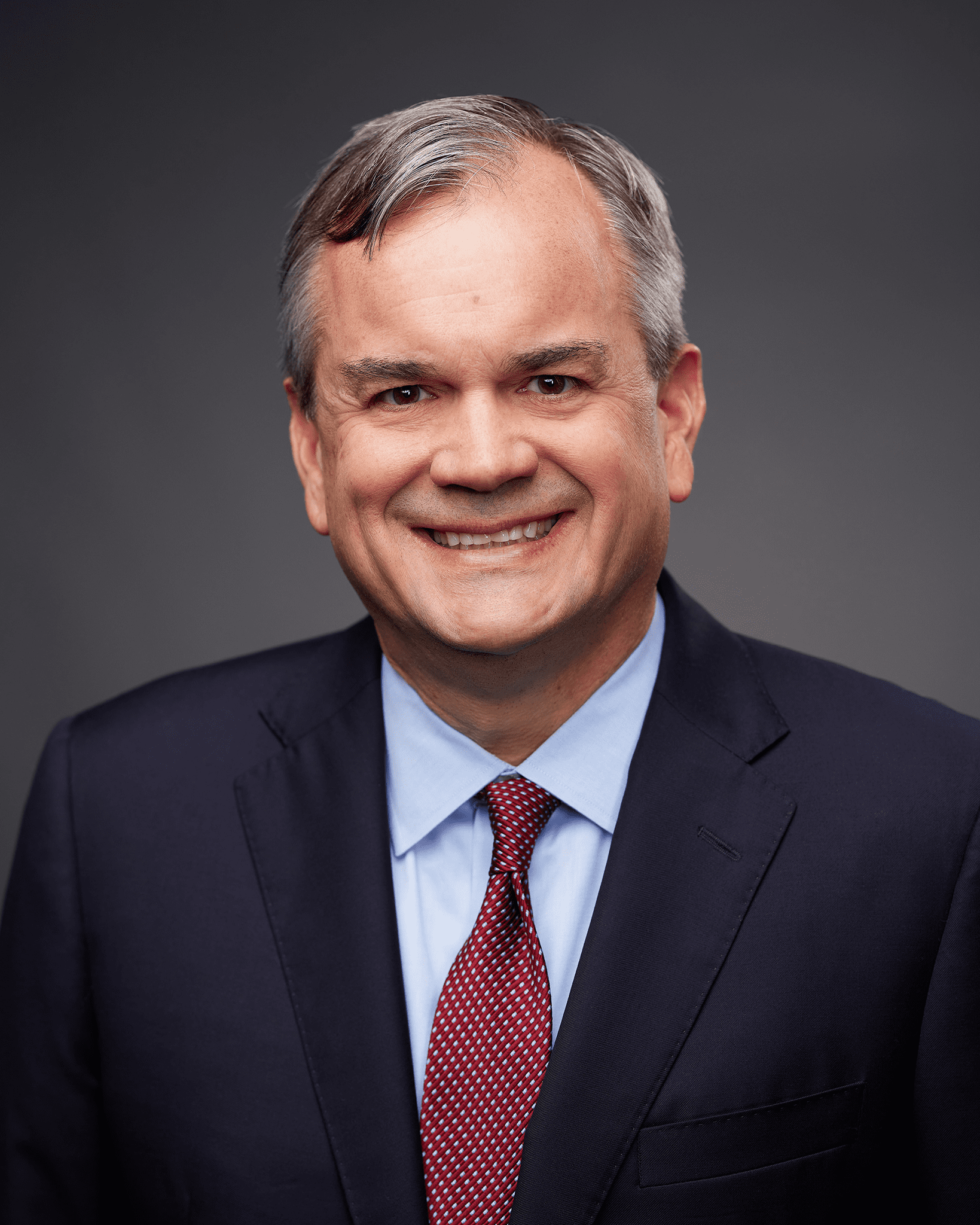

10th Chancellor of the Oklahoma State System of Higher Education
- Incumbent
- Assumed office December 2, 2024
- Preceded by: Allison D. Garrett

20th President of Southeastern Oklahoma State University
- In office July 1, 2014 – October 2019
- Preceded by: Larry Minks
- Succeeded by: Thomas Newsom

Oklahoma Senate Minority Leader
- In office January 15, 2012 – May 2014
- Preceded by: Andrew Rice
- Succeeded by: John Sparks

Member of the Oklahoma Senate from the 2nd district
- In office November 2006 – May 2014
- Preceded by: Stratton Taylor
- Succeeded by: Marty Quinn

Personal details
- Born: April 20, 1968 (age 58) Durant, Oklahoma, U.S.
- Citizenship: American; Choctaw Nation
- Party: Democratic
- Parent: Michael Burrage (father)
- Relatives: Steve Burrage (uncle)
- Education: University of Oklahoma
- Profession: Attorney

Sean Burrage is an American attorney and politician who is the Chancellor of the Oklahoma State System of Higher Education since 2024, and who served in the Oklahoma Senate representing the 2nd district from 2006 to 2014.

Burrage, a citizen of the Choctaw Nation, is the son of Michael Burrage, a former federal judge in Oklahoma and prominent Choctaw attorney.

In 2006, Burrage was elected to the Oklahoma Senate and he served until he opted not to run for reelection in 2014. In May 2014, he was hired as the president of Southeastern Oklahoma State University in Durant, Oklahoma. He stayed in office until 2019 when he left to work in the University of Oklahoma's administration. In October 2024, Burrage was announced as the new chancellor of the Oklahoma State System of Higher Education effective December 2.

== Early life, family and education ==
Sean Burrage was raised in Antlers, Oklahoma, in a Choctaw family. His father, Michael Burrage worked as the Choctaw Nation's general counsel. Burrage earned a bachelor of business administration from the University of Oklahoma in 1990 and a juris doctor from the University of Oklahoma College of Law from 1990 through 1993.

After graduating, Burrage worked for the University of Oklahoma as the director of state and federal relations until 1996. That year, he joined Taylor, Burrage, Foster, Mallett, Downs, & Ramsey, a law firm based out of Claremore, Oklahoma. Burrage was named Tri-County CASA Attorney of the Year in 2001 in recognition for his pro-bono representation of minor children in the juvenile court system. He was a Litigation Counsel of America Fellow and an Aspen-Rodel Fellow in Public Leadership.

Burrage was co-lead counsel in the I-40 bridge cases in Oklahoma and has represented numerous corporate clients in defense matters in state and federal courts throughout Oklahoma.

=== Oklahoma Senate ===
In 2006, Burrage was elected to represent Oklahoma Senate District 2, which includes Rogers and Mayes County.

During his tenure as a state senator, Burrage authored or co-authored over 50 bills that were enacted into law. He served on several legislative committees and task forces, including the 2008 legislative task force on Oklahoma's Promise. In 2007, he was voted the Higher Education Alumni Council's “Best Newcomer Legislator of the Year.” He was reelected in 2010 and served as the Senate Minority Floor Leader from 2012 to 2014. He did not run for reelection in 2014.

=== Higher education ===
In May 2014, he was named the 20th president of Southeastern Oklahoma State University. Under Burrage's leadership, SE streamlined operations, including establishing a shared vice president position with Murray State College, and significantly increased both undergraduate and graduate enrollment.

Burrage served as Vice Chairman of the Legislative Affairs Committee of the Council of Presidents (Oklahoma). Burrage was appointed to Governor Mary Fallin's Education Advisory Committee in 2015 and the State Regents’ Task Force on the Future of Higher Education in 2017. He also served on the Rogers State University Foundation and the Oklahoma Foundation for Excellence.

In September 2019, Burrage announced his intention to step down as president of SEOSU and take a position as the Vice President for Executive Affairs at the University of Oklahoma.

On October 9, 2024, Burrage was named the 10th chancellor of the Oklahoma State System for Higher Education, which comprises 25 institutions with nearly four dozen campuses around the state. His first day as chancellor was December 2.

== Election results ==
November 7, 2006 General Election

Candidate	Votes	%
Sean Burrage	13,673	57.94%
Ami Shaffer	9,926	42.06%
