= Orville Edwin Langley =

American judge

Chief Judge of the United States District Court for the Eastern District of Oklahoma
- In office 1965–1973
- Preceded by: Eugene Rice
- Succeeded by: Frederick Alvin Daugherty

Judge of the United States District Court for the Eastern District of Oklahoma
- In office January 27, 1965 – September 12, 1973
- Appointed by: Lyndon B. Johnson
- Preceded by: Eugene Rice
- Succeeded by: Joseph Wilson Morris

Personal details
- Born: Orville Edwin Langley; October 28, 1908 Prague, Oklahoma, US
- Died: September 12, 1973 (aged 64) Muskogee, Oklahoma, US
- Party: Democratic Party
- Education: Harvard University (B.S.); University of Tulsa College of Law (LL.B.)
- Occupation: Attorney, judge
- Profession: Law

Orville Edwin Langley (October 28, 1908 – September 12, 1973) was a United States district judge of the United States District Court for the Eastern District of Oklahoma.

== Education and career ==
Born on October 28, 1908, in Prague, Oklahoma, Langley received a Bachelor of Science degree from Harvard University in 1932 and a Bachelor of Laws from the University of Tulsa College of Law in 1940. He was in private practice in Muskogee, Oklahoma from 1940 to 1961. He was a United States Army Colonel from 1942 to 1946. He was a member of the Oklahoma House of Representatives from 1949 to 1952. He was the United States Attorney for the Eastern District of Oklahoma from 1961 to 1965.

== Federal judicial service ==
On January 7, 1965, Langley was nominated by President Lyndon B. Johnson to a seat on the United States District Court for the Eastern District of Oklahoma vacated by Judge Eugene Rice. He was confirmed by the United States Senate on January 26, 1965, and received his commission on January 27, 1965. He served as Chief Judge from 1965 to 1973. Langley served in that capacity until his death on September 12, 1973, in Muskogee. Joseph Morris succeeded him in this position.

== Family ==
Orville married Jessie Evans Cosgrove on November 27, 1936. They had one son and one daughter.

== Sources ==
Legal offices
Preceded by Eugene Rice	Judge of the United States District Court for the Eastern District of Oklahoma; 1965–1973	Succeeded by Joseph Wilson Morris
Preceded by Eugene Rice	Chief Judge of the United States District Court for the Eastern District of Oklahoma; 1965–1973	Succeeded by Frederick Alvin Daugherty
