= James H. Payne =

American judge (1941–2025)

Senior Judge of the United States District Court for the Eastern District of Oklahoma Senior Judge of the United States District Court for the Northern District of Oklahoma Senior Judge of the United States District Court for the Western District of Oklahoma
- In office August 1, 2017 – December 2, 2025

Chief Judge of the United States District Court for the Eastern District of Oklahoma
- In office 2002–2017
- Preceded by: Michael Burrage
- Succeeded by: Ronald A. White

Judge of the United States District Court for the Eastern District of Oklahoma Judge of the United States District Court for the Northern District of Oklahoma Judge of the United States District Court for the Western District of Oklahoma
- In office October 24, 2001 – August 1, 2017
- Appointed by: George W. Bush
- Preceded by: Michael Burrage
- Succeeded by: John F. Heil III

Magistrate Judge of the United States District Court for the Eastern District of Oklahoma
- In office 1988–2001

Personal details
- Born: March 5, 1941 Lubbock, Texas, U.S.
- Died: December 2, 2025 (aged 84)
- Education: University of Oklahoma (BS, JD)

James Hardy Payne (March 5, 1941 – December 2, 2025) was a United States district judge in Oklahoma, sitting simultaneously on the federal courts for the Eastern, the Northern and the Western districts.

== Life and career ==
James Hardy Payne was born on March 5, 1941, in Lubbock, Texas. He graduated from Stamford High School in 1959. He attended the University of Oklahoma on a football scholarship, graduating in 1963. He graduated from the University of Oklahoma College of Law with a Juris Doctor in 1966. From 1966 until 1970, he was on active duty as a judge advocate general in the United States Air Force. He continued as an Air Force reservist from 1975 until 1992.

From 1970 until 1973, Payne worked as an assistant United States attorney for the Eastern District of Oklahoma. In 1973, he entered private practice as lawyer for the firm of Sandlin and Payne, working as a partner to Robert Forney Sandlin (1934-2015), in Muskogee, Oklahoma.

In 1988, Payne was appointed a United States magistrate judge of the United States District Court for the Eastern District of Oklahoma, based in Muskogee.

=== Federal judicial service ===
On September 4, 2001, President George W. Bush nominated Payne to a seat that simultaneously serves all three of the United States district courts in Oklahoma: the United States District Court for the Eastern District of Oklahoma, the United States District Court for the Northern District of Oklahoma and the United States District Court for the Western District of Oklahoma. The seat had been vacated by Judge Michael Burrage, who had resigned on March 1, 2001. Payne was confirmed on October 23, 2001, and received his commission the next day. Although Payne was jointly appointed to all three districts, he did not maintain chambers nor did he hear cases in the Western District of Oklahoma. He assumed senior status on August 1, 2017.

Payne served as chief judge of the United States District Court for the Eastern District of Oklahoma from 2002 to 2017.

=== Tenth Circuit nomination under Bush ===
On September 25, 2005, President Bush nominated Payne to a seat on the United States Court of Appeals for the Tenth Circuit vacated by Judge Stephanie Kulp Seymour, who took senior status on October 16, 2005.

On January 23, 2006, Will Evans of the Center for Investigative Reporting published an article in the online magazine Salon.com reporting that Judge Payne "had issued more than 100 orders in at least 18 cases that involved corporations in which he owned stock", according to review of court and financial records.

Required to file annual financial disclosure forms, judges are expected to regulate themselves. Most district courts have computer systems designed to help monitor such conflicts of interest, but judges must enter their financial information and use it. The clerk's office of neither the Northern nor Eastern District Courts participate in monitoring, as this office does in some other courts.

The article noted that Payne had apparently violated federal law and the official Code of Conduct for U.S. judges, which "explicitly prohibit judges from sitting on cases involving companies in which they own stock—no matter how small their holdings". This prohibition, established as federal law in 1974 by Congress after the Watergate scandal, is intended to uphold the integrity of the judicial system.

Scholars of legal ethics such as professor Leslie W. Abramson, of University of Louisville's law school, and Stephen Gillers, of New York University School of Law, noted that the law was clear and that the judge should have recused himself from these cases where he had a conflict. Professor Steven Lubet, of Northwestern University School of Law, by contrast characterized Payne's actions as "careless mistakes" that were not very significant in terms of the cases or his career. Some lawyers in Oklahoma praised Payne's integrity, and said that most of his actions were "routine and procedural." But some plaintiffs were unhappy to learn of his conflict of interest while presiding over their cases.

According to available financial records, which dated to 1999, Judge Payne also had participated in cases in which he held stock in affected companies while he was serving as a magistrate judge in the Eastern District Court of Oklahoma. This information was not discovered during the review of his nomination as a federal district judge to the seat for the three districts in Oklahoma.

As a result of the Salon article and questions raised, the American Bar Association on February 21 re-evaluated Judge Payne's nomination and downgraded their original judicial rating of him from "well qualified" to "qualified". In addition, the Senate Judiciary Committee and the chief judge of the 10th Circuit said they would investigate Payne's record further.

While saying the "allegations were without merit", Judge Payne withdrew his nomination on March 8, 2006. He offered no further response to the article and refused to respond to the reporter seeking comments. He wrote to President Bush saying that he needed to oversee renovation of information technology systems of the District Courthouse in Muskogee. The allegations concerning financial conflicts of interest created the appearance of "extraordinary circumstances", which would have prevented his confirmation under the terms of the Gang of 14 deal.

On May 4, 2006, President Bush nominated Jerome Holmes for the position on the appellate court. Holmes was confirmed by the Senate less than three months later.

=== Death ===
Payne died on December 2, 2025, at the age of 84.

== See also ==
- George W. Bush judicial appointment controversies

Legal offices
Preceded by Michael Burrage	Judge of the United States District Court for the Eastern District of Oklahoma; Judge of the United States District Court for the Northern District of Oklahoma; Judge of the United States District Court for the Western District of Oklahoma; 2001–2017	Succeeded by John F. Heil III
Preceded by Michael Burrage	Chief Judge of the United States District Court for the Eastern District of Oklahoma; 2002–2017	Succeeded by Ronald A. White
