= Gilbert Horn Sr. =

American judge

Gilbert Horn Sr. (May 12, 1923 – March 27, 2016) was an American military veteran who served as an Assiniboine code talker during World War II. Horn, a member of the Merrill's Marauders during the war, utilized the Assiniboine language to encode communications by the U.S. military in the Pacific theater. In 2014, Horn was made an honorary chief of Fort Belknap Assiniboine by Assiniboine elder Kenneth Ryan of Wolf Point Mt.

Horn was born on the Fort Belknap Indian Reservation of Montana on May 12, 1923, to Melvina (Tall Youth) and Jesse Iron Horn Sr. He was raised on the reservation and attended school in Dodson, Montana, until he completed 8th grade. Later in life, Horn had one child with his first wife, Elizabeth Bradley, and eleven children with his second wife, Elizabeth Jackson.

Horn enlisted in the United States Army 1940, when he was 17 years old, and was assigned to the 163rd Infantry Battalion. He was trained in both Army communications and encryption. Horn, a code talker who spoke Assiniboine, an indigenous language of Montana, used his linguistic abilities to encrypt U.S. communications against the Japanese during World War II.

Horn volunteered for an assignment with Merrill's Marauders, a U.S. Army special operations led by General Frank Merrill in the South-East Asian theatre of World War II, beginning in 1943. As a member of the Marauders, Horn completed an 800-mile march across the mountains of Burma and southern China to cut off Japanese supply lines in the region. Fewer than 1,200 troops survived Merrill's Marauders' campaign. Horn and the surviving Maurauders were awarded a Distinguished Unit Citation for "gallantry, determination and esprit de corps in accomplishing its mission under extremely difficult and hazardous conditions." Horn also received a Bronze Star Medal and a Purple Heart.

Horn was honorably discharged from the United States Army after the war. He returned to his grandparents' farm on the Fort Belknap Indian Reservation, where he became involved in the reservation's tribal politics and judiciary. He served on the Fort Belknap Community Council for nineteen years. Horn also wrote the first regulations to govern the Fort Belknap Tribal Juvenile Court and served as a judge for eight years. Horn, who served as the former chairman of the National Congress of American Indians' Rocky Mountain Region chapter, successfully lobbied the U.S. federal government for a new health clinic on the Fort Belknap Indian Reservation.

Montana State University–Northern awarded Horn an honorary doctorate in humanitarian services in 2013. In 2014, Fort Belknap Assiniboine Tribe named him the honorary chief, becoming the first person to receive the title since the 1890s. The recently constructed early learning center on the Fort Belknap Reservation has also been named in Horn's honor.

Gilbert Horn died at the Northern Montana Care Center in Havre, Montana, on March 27, 2016, at the age of 92. He was survived by eleven children, thirty-seven grandchildren, and almost ninety great-grandchildren and great-great-grandchildren. He was buried at a family cemetery, located on the reservation east of Fort Belknap Agency.

== See also ==
- List of Native American jurists
