= William Bernhardt =

American poet

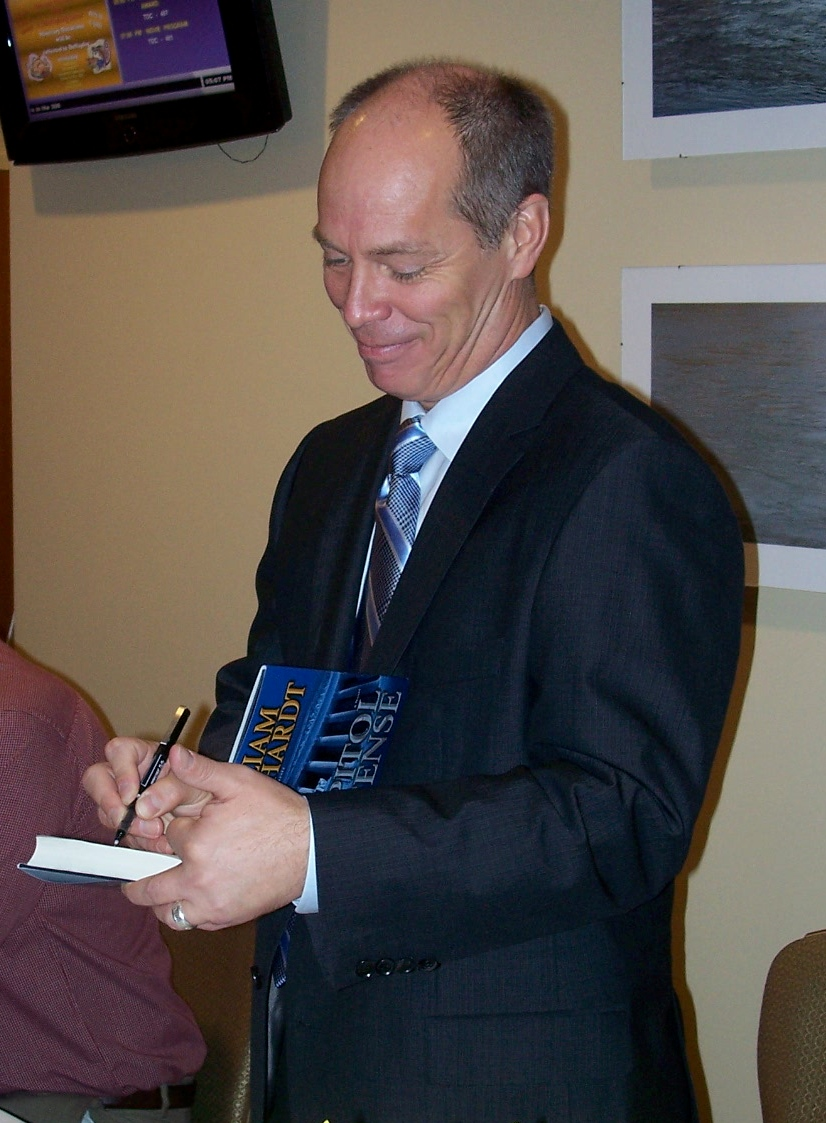
Bernhardt at the University of Scranton in November 2009

William Bernhardt is an American thriller/mystery/suspense fiction author best known for his "Ben Kincaid" series of books .

== Career ==
Bernhardt is best known for his series of legal thrillers. Library Journal called him the "master of the courtroom drama". He has written several novels outside the series, including Nemesis: The Final Case of Eliot Ness and The Florentine Poet, which has been called, "The Princess Bride for literature lovers." Bernhardt spent over two years researching Nemesis, which provides a compelling solution to the unsolved mystery of the identity of The Mad Butcher of Cleveland, generally considered America's first true serial killer. His other series characters include, Susan Pulaski (Dark Eye and Strip Search), Daniel Pike (The Last Chance Lawyer), and Kenzi Rivera (Splitsville). His most recent novel is Challengers of the Dust (2025), a historical novel set in 1935 Dust Bowl Oklahoma.

In 2023, acting on a suggestion from his son, he wrote Partners in Crime, which teamed his two fictional lawyer characters, Ben Kincaid and Daniel Pike. He followed that with Justice For All (2024), which paired Daniel Pike with Kenzi Rivera.

He is currently researching and writing a biography, yet to be announced.

In August 2026, Bernhardt was a guest on the Off the Shelf podcast.

== Awards ==
Bernhardt has sold more than 10 million books in the United States and around the world. He has been nominated for the Oklahoma Book Award 21 times in four categories (Fiction, Poetry, Young Adult, and Design) and has won three times, in 1995, 1999, and 2024. In 1998 he received the Southern Writers Guild's Gold Medal Award. In 2000, he was honored with the H. Louise Cobb Distinguished Author Award, given "in recognition of an outstanding body of work that has profoundly influenced the way in which we understand ourselves and American society at large." That same year, he was presented with a Career Achievement Award at the 2000 Booklovers Convention in Houston. He has been inducted into the Oklahoma Writers Hall of Fame. His poetry has received two Pushcart Prize nominations and an Oklahoma Book Award nomination. He has also received a Certificate of Recognition from the Academy of American Poets. In 2019, he received the Arrell Gibson Lifetime Achievement Award.

== Teaching ==
Bernhardt founded WriterCon, which hosts an annual writing workshop each year in Oklahoma attended by over 300 people in 2024, plus small-group seminars and writing cruises. He provides a free WriterCon newsletter which he updates regularly with news on writing and the publishing business, plus a WriterCon magazine and podcast. Successfully published graduates of Bernhardt's writing programs include New York Times-bestselling author Aprilynne Pike, UK national bestseller Sarah Rees Brennan, Oklahoma Book Award-winner Sheldon Russell, Audrey Streetman, Greg Field, Michael W. Hinkle, Callie Hutton, Lela Davidson, Angela Christina Archer, Tamara Grantham, Bill Fernandez, Kenneth Andrus, Paul Dalzell, John Biggs, Bill Wetterman, Sabrina A Fish, Burke Holbrook, Rick Ludwig, Betsey Kulakowski, Marty Ludlum, Rick Ludwig, and more than a dozen others. He has also written the ten books on writing in the nonfiction Red Sneaker book series.

== Legal career ==
A former trial attorney and partner at Hall Estill, Bernhardt received several awards for his pro bono work and public service. In 1994, Barrister Magazine named him one of the top 25 young lawyers in America.

== Personal life ==
He lives in Oklahoma with his wife, Lara Bernhardt, the novelist (Shadow of the Taj), their eight children, and his cat, Bustopher.

On October 10, 2013, Bernhardt became a Jeopardy! champion, fulfilling a lifelong dream of appearing on that quiz show.

Bernhardt helped develop the characters for a WWII-era RPG computer game, Burden of Command, which will be released on April 8, 2025.

In addition to his novels and poetry, Bernhardt has written plays, a musical (book and score—he is a skilled pianist), humor, children stories, biography, and puzzles for The New York Times. He has edited two anthologies (Legal Briefs and Natural Suspect) as fundraisers for The Nature Conservancy and the Children's Legal Defense Fund. In his spare time, he has enjoyed surfing, digging for dinosaurs, trekking through the Himalayas, paragliding, scuba diving, caving, zip-lining over the canopy of the Costa Rican rainforest, and jumping out of an airplane at 10,000 feet.

OSU has called Bernhardt “Oklahoma’s Renaissance Man.” In 2017, when Bernhardt delivered the keynote address at the San Francisco Writers Conference, chairman Michael Larsen noted that in addition to penning novels, Bernhardt can “write a sonnet, play a sonata, plant a garden, try a lawsuit, teach a class, cook a gourmet meal, beat you at Scrabble, and work the New York Times crossword in under five minutes.”

His youngest son is the Washington Post Award-winning photographer Ralph Bernhardt, of Ralph Bernhardt Media. His eldest son, Harry, is a travel influencer who posts on the YouTube site, Burnhearts World. His daughter Alice is a librarian and the editor-in-chief of Bernhardt Books. His daughter Kadey is a librarian and the editor of WriterCon Magazine.

== Bibliography ==
"Ben Kincaid" series

1. Primary Justice (1991)
2. Blind Justice (1992)
3. Deadly Justice (1993)
4. Perfect Justice (1994)
5. Cruel Justice (1996)
6. Naked Justice (1997)
7. Extreme Justice (1998)
8. Dark Justice (1999)
9. Silent Justice (2000)
10. Murder One (2001)
11. Criminal Intent (2002)
12. Death Row (2003)
13. Hate Crime (2004)
14. Capitol Murder (2006)
15. Capitol Threat (2007)
16. Capitol Conspiracy (2008)
17. Capitol Offense (2009)
18. Capitol Betrayal (2010)
19. Justice Returns (2017)

Other books

- The Code of Buddyhood (1992)
- Double Jeopardy (1995)
- The Midnight Before Christmas (1998)
- Final Round (2001)
- Bad Faith (2002)
- Dark Eye (2005)
- Strip Search (2007)
- Princess Alice and the Dreadful Dragon (2008)
- Nemesis: The Final Case of Eliot Ness (2009)
- The White Bird (poetry) (2013)
- The Black Sentry (young adult) (2014)
- Equal Justice: The Courage of Ada Lois Sipuel (biography for young readers) (2014)
- Shine (young adult) (2015)
- The Game Master (2015)
- The Ocean's Edge (poetry) (2016)
- The Florentine Poet (2023)
- Traveling Salesman's Son (poetry) (2023)
- Challengers of the Dust (2025)

"Daniel Pike/Kenzi Rivera" series

- The Last Chance Lawyer (2019)
- Court of Killers (2019)
- Trial by Blood (2020)
- Twisted Justice (2020)
- Judge and Jury (2021)
- Final Verdict (2021)
- Partners in Crime (2023)
- Justice for All (2024)
- Splitsville (2021)
- Exposed (2022)
- Shameless (2022)

"Red Sneaker Writer Book series

- Story Structure: The Key to Successful Fiction (2010)
- Creating Character: Bringing Your Story to Life (2011)
- Perfecting Plot: Charting the Hero's Journey (2012)
- The White Bird (poetry) (2013)
- Dynamic Dialogue: Letting Your Story Speak (2014)
- Powerful Premise: Writing the Irresistible (2015)
- Excellent Editing: The Writing Process (2016)
- Thinking Theme: The Heart of the Matter (2017)
- What Writers Need to Know: Essential Topics (2019)
- Dazzling Description: Painting the Perfect Picture (2020)
