= Frank Howell Seay =

American judge (1938–2026)

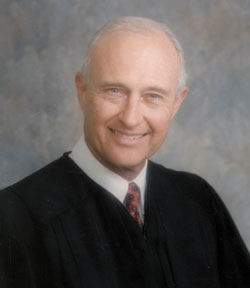

Judge of the United States District Court for the Eastern District of Oklahoma
- In office November 2, 1979 – September 25, 2003
- Appointed by: Jimmy Carter
- Preceded by: Joseph Wilson Morris
- Succeeded by: Ronald A. White

Chief Judge of the United States District Court for the Eastern District of Oklahoma
- In office 1980–1996
- Preceded by: Joseph Wilson Morris
- Succeeded by: Michael Burrage

Senior Judge of the United States District Court for the Eastern District of Oklahoma
- In office September 25, 2003 – November 1, 2026

Personal details
- Born: September 5, 1938 Shawnee, Oklahoma, U.S.
- Died: November 1, 2026 (aged 88)
- Education: University of Oklahoma (BA, LLB)

Frank Howell Seay (September 5, 1938 – November 1, 2026) was an American jurist who served as a United States district judge of the United States District Court for the Eastern District of Oklahoma from 1979 to 2026.

== Education and career ==
Seay was born in Shawnee, Oklahoma. He received a Bachelor of Arts degree from University of Oklahoma in 1961 and a Bachelor of Laws from University of Oklahoma College of Law in 1963. He was in private practice of law in Seminole, Oklahoma from 1963 to 1966. He was the county attorney of Seminole County, Oklahoma from 1963 to 1966. He was the first assistant district attorney of 22nd Judicial District of Oklahoma from 1967 to 1968. He was an Associate judge of the District Court of Oklahoma in Seminole County from 1968 to 1974. He was a judge of the 22nd Judicial District Court of Oklahoma from 1974 to 1979.

=== Federal judicial service ===
Seay was nominated by President Jimmy Carter on September 28, 1979, to a seat on the United States District Court for the Eastern District of Oklahoma vacated by Judge Joseph Wilson Morris. He was confirmed by the United States Senate on October 31, 1979, and received his commission on November 2, 1979. He served as chief judge from 1980 to 1996. He assumed senior status on September 25, 2003. He actively heard cases until December 31, 2016, and remained on the bench until his death on November 1, 2026.

=== Ada affair ===
Seay was instrumental in reversing the miscarriages of justice that led to the convictions of Ron Williamson and Dennis Fritz for the murder of Debbie Carter in Ada, Oklahoma, events that were documented in John Grisham's non-fiction book The Innocent Man. He was quoted as attaching to an epilogue of his legal opinion: "God help us, if ever in this great country we turn our heads while people who have not had fair trials are executed. That almost happened in this case".

== Personal life and death ==
Seay's paternal grandfather was a full-blooded Native American. Seay did not discover his Native American heritage, likely Cherokee, until after he was appointed to the federal bench. Nevertheless, Seay was the first Native American appointed to a federal bench in the United States.

Seay died on November 1, 2026, at the age of 88.

== See also ==
- List of Native American jurists
- List of United States federal judges by longevity of service

== Sources ==
Legal offices
Preceded by Joseph Wilson Morris	Judge of the United States District Court for the Eastern District of Oklahoma; 1979–2003	Succeeded by Ronald A. White
Preceded by Joseph Wilson Morris	Chief Judge of the United States District Court for the Eastern District of Oklahoma; 1980–1996	Succeeded by Michael Burrage
