= List of United States federal courthouses in Oklahoma =

Following is a list of current and former courthouses of the United States federal court system located in Oklahoma. Each entry indicates the name of the building along with an image, if available, its location and the jurisdiction it covers, the dates during which it was used for each such jurisdiction, and, if applicable the person for whom it was named, and the date of renaming. Dates of use will not necessarily correspond with the dates of construction or demolition of a building, as pre-existing structures may be adapted or court use, and former court buildings may later be put to other uses. Also, the official name of the building may be changed at some point after its use as a federal court building has been initiated.

== Courthouses ==
Courthouse	City	Image	Street address	Jurisdiction	Dates of use	Named for
U.S. Post Office and Courthouse	Ada		131 East 12th Street	E.D. Ok.	1934–? Still in use as a post office.	n/a
U.S. Post Office and Courthouse	Ardmore		39 North Washington Street	E.D. Ok.	1916–? Still in use as a federal building.	n/a
U.S. Post Office and Courthouse	Bartlesville		420 South Johnstone Avenue	N.D. Ok.	1932–? Now the Washington County Courthouse.	n/a
U.S. Post Office and Courthouse†	Chickasha		117 North 4th Street	E.D. Ok. W.D. Ok.	1919–? Now the city hall.	n/a
Wheeler Federal Building	Durant		224 West Evergreen Street	E.D. Ok.	1929–? Built 1919; now owned by the city.	n/a
U.S. Post Office and Courthouse	Enid		?	W.D. Ok.	1912–1941; Razed in the early 1960s.	n/a
U.S. Post Office and Courthouse	Enid		115 West Broadway Avenue	W.D. Ok.	1941–? Still in use as a post office.	n/a
U.S. Post Office and Courthouse	Guthrie		201 West Oklahoma Avenue	W.D. Ok.	1906–c. 1996; Still in use as a post office.	n/a
Federal Building and U.S. Courthouse^{†}	Lawton		410 Southwest 5th Street	W.D. Ok. U.S. Probation Office	1917–present	n/a
U.S. Post Office	Mangum		101 South Pennsylvania Avenue	W.D. Ok.	1936–? Still in use as a post office.	n/a
Carl Albert Federal Building†	McAlester		301 East Carl Albert Parkway	E.D. Ok.	1914–2013; Now owned by the city.	U.S. Rep. Carl Albert (1984)
U.S. Post Office and Courthouse	Miami		34 A Street Northeast	N.D. Ok.	1933–? Still in use as a post office.	n/a
Ed Edmondson U.S. Courthouse^{†}	Muskogee		101 North Fifth Street	E.D. Okla.	1915–present	U.S. Rep. Ed Edmondson (2003)
U.S. Post Office, Courthouse, and Federal Office Building^{†}	Oklahoma City		215 Dean A. McGee Avenue	8th Cir. 10th Cir.	1926–present	n/a
William J. Holloway, Jr. U.S. Courthouse	Oklahoma City		200 Northwest 4th Street	W.D. Ok. 10th Cir.	1962–present	William Judson Holloway Jr. (2016)
U.S. Post Office and Courthouse	Okmulgee		111 West 4th Street	E.D. Ok. Bankruptcy Court	1933–present Uncertain on current use, but the E.D. Ok. Bankruptcy Court has been located in the Ed Edmonson U.S. Courthouse in Muskogee, Oklahoma, since approximately 2019.	n/a
U.S. Post Office and Courthouse	Ponca City		402 East Grand Avenue	W.D. Ok.	1934–? Still in use as a post office.	n/a
U.S. Post Office and Courthouse^{†}	Tulsa		224 South Boulder Avenue	E.D. Ok. N.D. Ok.	1917–present	n/a
U.S. Post Office and Courthouse	Vinita		120 East Illinois Avenue	N.D. Ok.	1939–1966; Still in use as a post office.	n/a
U.S. Post Office and Courthouse^{†}	Woodward		1023 10th Street	W.D. Ok.	1921–1966; Now the Woodward Public Schools Administration Building.	n/a

== Key ==
^{†}	Listed on the National Register of Historic Places (NRHP)
^{††}	NRHP-listed and also designated as a National Historic Landmark
