= Michelle Brown-Yazzie =

Native American attorney

Michelle Brown-Yazzie is a Native American attorney who serves as the Assistant Attorney General for the Navajo Nation Department of Justice Water Rights Unit. In this role, she works to protect the water rights of the Navajo Nation, advocating for the rights of the Nation's citizens and protecting the natural resources of the area.

Brown-Yazzie is a citizen of the Navajo Nation, as well as being of Oglala Lakota and Interior Salish and Kootenai descent. She has spent her career working with tribal communities, advancing the rights of Indigenous people and advocating for their legal rights.

Originally from NaʼNiilzhiin (Torreon, New Mexico, Brown-Yazzie is a part of the Táchiiʼnii Clan.

== Education ==
Brown-Yazzie attended the University of New Mexico for her undergraduate degree where in 1995, she earned her B.A. in English and political science. She then went on to attend law school at the University of Iowa College of Law where she received her J.D. in 1999.

== Career ==
At the start of her career, Brown-Yazzie served as the Staff Attorney and Senior Prosecutor for the Navajo Nation. After this, she was appointed as the New Mexico Deputy Cabinet Secretary for the New Mexico Indian Affairs Department by Governor Bill Richardson. She practiced law for 21 years before she started serving in the judiciary in 2011. Before moving to her current job, Brown-Yazzie served as Chief Judge for the Mescalero Apache Tribe. She is currently serving as the Assistant Attorney General for the Navajo Nation Department of Justice Water Rights Unit where she is working on the Navajo-Gallup Water Supply pipeline project. Brown-Yazzie and her office is also working on the settlement process with the state of Arizona over water rights for the Navajo Nation.
