= Ronald A. White =

American judge (born 1961)

Ronald White

Senior Judge of the United States District Court for the Eastern District of Oklahoma
- Incumbent
- Assumed office January 27, 2026

Chief Judge of the United States District Court for the Eastern District of Oklahoma
- In office February 10, 2017 – January 27, 2026
- Preceded by: James H. Payne
- Succeeded by: John F. Heil III

Judge of the United States District Court for the Eastern District of Oklahoma
- In office October 2, 2003 – January 27, 2026
- Appointed by: George W. Bush
- Preceded by: Frank Howell Seay
- Succeeded by: Vacant

Personal details
- Born: Ronald Allen White; January 27, 1961 (age 65) Sapulpa, Oklahoma, U.S.
- Education: University of Oklahoma (BA, JD)

Ronald Allen White (born January 27, 1961) is a senior United States district judge of the United States District Court for the Eastern District of Oklahoma.

== Education and career ==
White was born in Sapulpa, Oklahoma. He received a Bachelor of Arts degree from the University of Oklahoma in 1983 and a Juris Doctor from the University of Oklahoma College of Law in 1986. He was in private practice in Tulsa, Oklahoma, from 1986 to 2003.

=== Federal judicial service ===
On May 15, 2003, White was nominated by President George W. Bush to a seat on the United States District Court for the Eastern District of Oklahoma vacated by Judge Frank Howell Seay. White was confirmed by the United States Senate on September 30, 2003, and received his commission on October 2, 2003. He became chief judge in 2017. He assumed senior status on January 27, 2026.

=== Notable case ===
On September 30, 2014, White ruled that the Affordable Care Act subsidies should not be made available in states that did not choose to set up their own health care exchanges. His opinion was noteworthy, as he became the first federal judge to rule on the issue after two different appeals courts issued conflicting rulings. He interacts with both rulings in his own opinion.

== Sources ==
Legal offices
Preceded by Frank Howell Seay	Judge of the United States District Court for the Eastern District of Oklahoma; 2003–2026	Vacant
Preceded by James H. Payne	Chief Judge of the United States District Court for the Eastern District of Oklahoma; 2017–2026	Succeeded by John F. Heil III
