= Ralph E. Campbell =

American judge

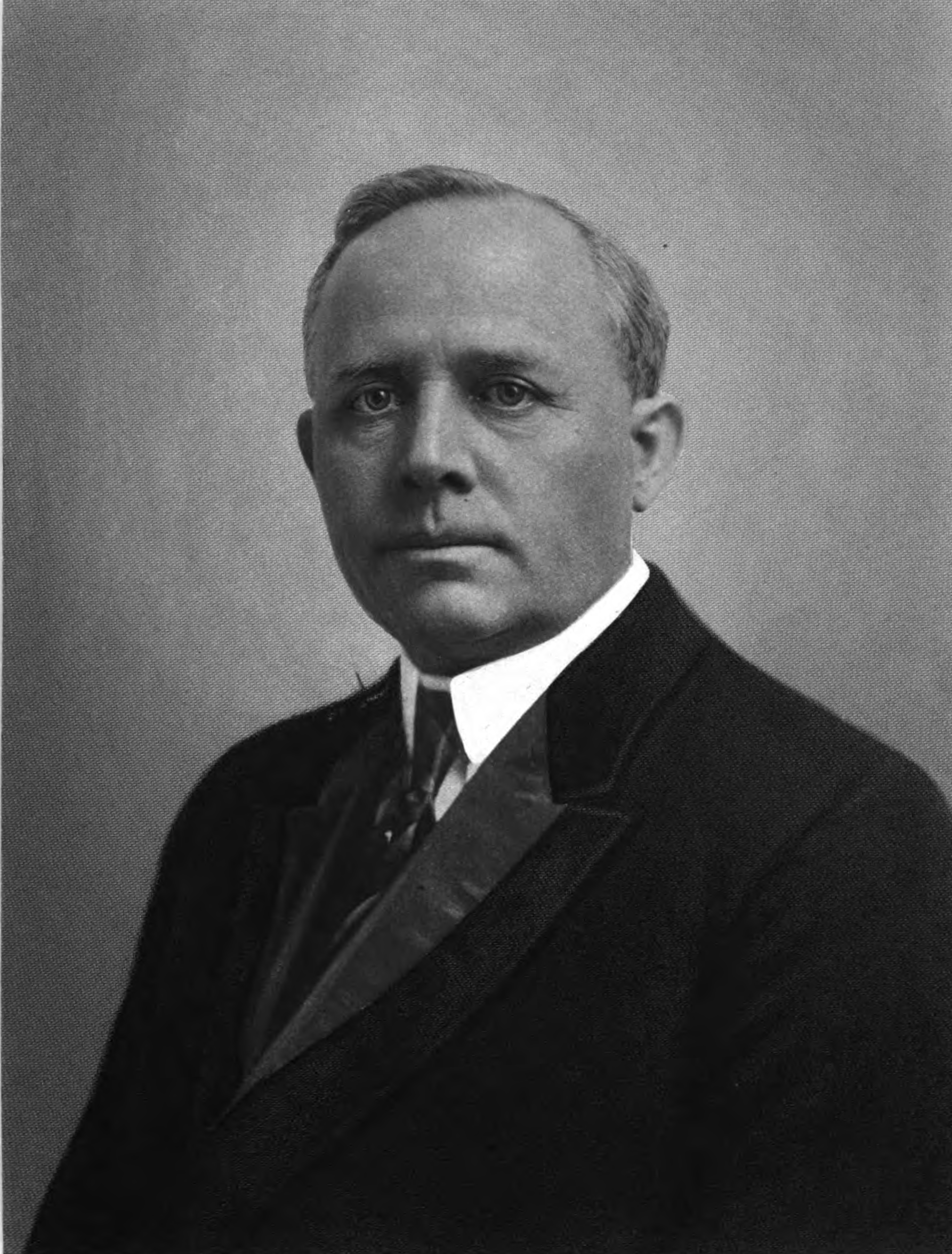

Judge of the United States District Court for the Eastern District of Oklahoma
- In office November 11, 1907 – August 31, 1918
- Appointed by: Theodore Roosevelt
- Preceded by: Seat established by 34 Stat. 267
- Succeeded by: Robert L. Williams

Personal details
- Born: Ralph Emerson Campbell; May 9, 1867 Butler County, Pennsylvania, U.S.
- Died: January 9, 1921 (aged 53) Tulsa, Oklahoma, U.S.
- Cause of death: Suicide (gunshot)
- Education: Valparaiso University (B.S., A.B.); University of Kansas School of Law (LL.B.)
- Occupation: Attorney, judge
- Profession: law

Ralph Emerson Campbell (May 9, 1867 – January 9, 1921) was a United States district judge of the United States District Court for the Eastern District of Oklahoma.

== Education and career ==
Born in Butler County, Pennsylvania, Campbell received a Bachelor of Science degree from Northern Indiana Normal School (now Valparaiso University, of the Lutheran Church-Missouri Synod, in Valparaiso, Indiana) in 1891, an Artium Baccalaureus (Bachelor of Arts) academic degree from the same institution the following year, and a Bachelor of Laws from the University of Kansas School of Law (of the University of Kansas in Lawrence, Kansas) in 1894. He was an assistant general solicitor for the Choctaw, Oklahoma and Gulf Railroad in the Indian Territory and adjacent state of Arkansas from 1895 to 1901, and general attorney of Choctaw, Oklahoma and Gulf Railroad in the adjacent Oklahoma Territory from 1901 to 1903. In 1902, he was elected president of the Oklahoma Territorial Bar Association, and leader of the Oklahoma Territorial delegation to the 1904 Republican National Convention, meeting in June 1904 at the Chicago Coliseum in Chicago, Illinois. Of which they strongly supported incumbent 26th President Theodore Roosevelt (1858-1919, served 1901-1909), nomination for reelection as president in that year's 1904 campaign and elections. He was in private practice in South McAlester (now McAlester), Indian Territory (State of Oklahoma from November 16, 1907) from 1905 to 1907.

== Federal judicial service ==
Frank Frantz, the last Republican Territorial governor was an old friend of Theodore Roosevelt from the San Juan Hill campaign in the Spanish-American War. Ralph Campbell, as chairman of the 1908 Republican convention, had been a staunch supporter of Frantz at the convention. Frantz therefore strongly recommended that Roosevelt nominate Campbell as judge for the Eastern District of Oklahoma. On November 11, 1907, Campbell received a recess appointment from President Theodore Roosevelt to a new seat on the United States District Court for the Eastern District of Oklahoma created by 34 Stat. 276. Formally nominated to the same position by President Roosevelt on December 3, 1907, he was confirmed by the United States Senate on January 13, 1908, and received his commission the same day. Campbell served in that capacity until August 31, 1918, when he resigned.

== Later career and death ==
Following his resignation from the federal bench, Campbell resumed private practice with the law firm of Cosden and Company in Tulsa, Oklahoma from 1918 to 1921. He died in Tulsa on January 9, 1921.

In his book, The Federal Courts of the Tenth Circuit: A History, author James K. Logan states that Judge Campbell killed himself by a gunshot in his office on a Sunday morning. Campbell left no message concerning why he took the action. He had no known enemies, was not involved in any scandal, and his personal reputation is still excellent in the 21st century.

== Electoral history ==
1907 Oklahoma Supreme Court District 1 election
Party	Candidate	Votes	%	±%
Democratic	John B. Turner	132,821	57.2	New
Republican	Ralph E. Campbell	99,302	42.7	New
Democratic gain from		Swing	N/A	

== Sources ==
Legal offices
Preceded by Seat established by 34 Stat. 276	Judge of the United States District Court for the Eastern District of Oklahoma; 1907–1918	Succeeded by Robert L. Williams
