= United States District Court for the Eastern District of Oklahoma =

United States federal district court in Oklahoma

Coordinates: 35.75020°N 95.37439°W

- (E.D. Okla.)
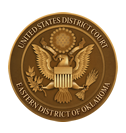
- Location: Ed Edmondson U.S. Courthouse (Muskogee) More locations: Ada; Ardmore; Durant; Hugo; Okmulgee; Poteau; McAlester
- Appeals to: Tenth Circuit
- Established: June 16, 1906
- Judges: 2
- Chief Judge: John F. Heil III

Officers of the court
- U.S. Attorney: Christopher Wilson
- U.S. Marshal: Johnny Teehee
- www.oked.uscourts.gov

The United States District Court for the Eastern District of Oklahoma (in case citations, E.D. Okla. or E.D. Ok.) is a federal court in the Tenth Circuit (except for patent claims and claims against the U.S. government under the Tucker Act, which are appealed to the Federal Circuit).

The District was established on June 16, 1906, and became operational on November 16, 1907, with Oklahoma achieving statehood.

The court's jurisdiction comprises the following counties: Adair, Atoka, Bryan, Carter, Cherokee, Choctaw, Coal, Haskell, Hughes, Johnston, Latimer, LeFlore, Love, Marshall, McCurtain, McIntosh, Murray, Muskogee, Okfuskee, Okmulgee, Pittsburg, Pontotoc, Pushmataha, Seminole, Sequoyah, and Wagoner.

The court is housed in the Ed Edmondson U.S. Courthouse in Muskogee.

The United States Attorney's Office of the Eastern District of Oklahoma represents the United States in civil and criminal litigation in the court. As of December 26, 2021 the United States attorney for the district is Christopher Wilson.

== History ==
Judge Frank Howell Seay, appointed to the court by President Jimmy Carter in 1979, was the first Native American (Seminole) appointed to any U.S. district court.

== Current judges ==
As of January 27, 2026:

#	Title	Judge	Duty station	Born	Term of service			Appointed by
#	Title	Judge	Duty station	Born	Active	Chief	Senior	Appointed by
18	Chief Judge	John F. Heil III (Note: Jointly appointed to the Eastern, Northern, and Western Districts of Oklahoma.)	Muskogee	1968	2020–present	2026–present	—	Trump
19	District Judge	vacant	—	—	—	—	—	—
17	Senior Judge	Ronald A. White	Muskogee	1961	2003–2026	2017–2026	2026–present	G.W. Bush

== Vacancies and pending nominations ==
Seat	Prior judge's duty station	Seat last held by	Vacancy reason	Date of vacancy	Nominee	Date of nomination
1	Muskogee	Ronald A. White	Senior status	January 27, 2026	Zach West	September 14, 2026

== Former judges ==
#	Judge	Born–died	Active service	Chief Judge	Senior status	Appointed by	Reason for termination
1	Ralph E. Campbell	1867–1921	1907–1918 (Note: Recess appointment; formally nominated on December 8, 1907, confirmed by the United States Senate on January 13, 1908, and received commission the same day.)	—	—	T. Roosevelt	resignation
2	Robert L. Williams	1868–1948	1919–1937	—	—	Wilson	elevation
3	Franklin Elmore Kennamer	1879–1960	1924–1925	—	—	Coolidge	reassignment
4	Alfred P. Murrah	1904–1975	1937–1940 (Note: Jointly appointed to the Eastern, Northern, and Western Districts of Oklahoma.)	—	—	F. Roosevelt	elevation
5	Eugene Rice	1891–1967	1937–1963	1949–1963	1963–1967	F. Roosevelt	death
6	Bower Slack Broaddus	1888–1949	1940–1949	—	—	F. Roosevelt	death
7	William Robert Wallace	1886–1960	1950–1960	—	—	Truman	death
8	Luther L. Bohanon	1902–2003	1961–1974	—	1974–2003	Kennedy	death
9	Frederick Alvin Daugherty	1914–2006	1961–1982 (Note: Recess appointment; formally nominated on January 15, 1962, confirmed by the Senate on February 7, 1962, and received commission on February 17, 1962. Jointly appointed to the Eastern, Northern, and Western Districts of Oklahoma.)	1973–1975	1982–2006	Kennedy	death
10	Orville Edwin Langley	1908–1973	1965–1973	1965–1973	—	L. Johnson	death
11	Joseph Wilson Morris	1922–2021	1974–1978	1975–1978	—	Nixon	resignation
12	H. Dale Cook	1924–2008	1974–1992	—	1992–2008	Ford	death
13	Frank Howell Seay	1938–2026	1979–2003	1980–1996	2003–2026	Carter	death
14	David Lynn Russell	1942–present	1981–1990	—	—	Reagan	reassignment
15	Michael Burrage	1950–present	1994–2001	1996–2001	—	Clinton	resignation
16	James H. Payne	1941–2025	2001–2017	2002–2017	2017–2025	G.W. Bush	death

== Chief judges ==
Chief judges have administrative responsibilities with respect to their district court. Unlike the Supreme Court, where one justice is specifically nominated to be chief, the office of chief judge rotates among the district court judges. To be chief, a judge must have been in active service on the court for at least one year, be under the age of 65, and have not previously served as chief judge.

A vacancy is filled by the judge highest in seniority among the group of qualified judges. The chief judge serves for a term of seven years, or until age 70, whichever occurs first. The age restrictions are waived if no members of the court would otherwise be qualified for the position.

When the office was created in 1948, the chief judge was the longest-serving judge who had not elected to retire, on what has since 1958 been known as senior status, or declined to serve as chief judge. After August 6, 1959, judges could not become or remain chief after turning 70 years old. The current rules have been in operation since October 1, 1982.

== Succession of seats ==
Seat 1
Seat established on November 16, 1907 by 34 Stat. 267
Campbell	1908–1918
Williams	1919–1937
Rice	1937–1963
Langley	1965–1973
Morris	1974–1978
Seay	1979–2003
White	2003–2026
vacant	2026–present

Seat 2
Seat established on September 14, 1922 by 42 Stat. 837 (temporary)
Kennamer	1924–1925
Seat reassigned to Northern District and made permanent on February 16, 1925 by 43 Stat. 945

Seat 3
Seat established on June 22, 1936 by 49 Stat. 1804 (concurrent with Northern and Western Districts)
Murrah	1937–1940
Broaddus	1940–1949
Wallace	1950–1960
Bohanon	1961–1974
Cook	1974–1992
Burrage	1994–2001
Payne	2001–2017
Heil III	2020–present

Seat 4
Seat established on May 19, 1961 by 75 Stat. 80 (concurrent with Northern and Western Districts)
Daugherty	1962–1982
Russell	1981–1990
Seat reassigned solely to Western District on December 1, 1990 by 104 Stat. 5089

== See also ==
- Courts of Oklahoma
- List of current United States district judges
- List of United States federal courthouses in Oklahoma
