= United States Post Office and Courthouse (Columbus, Ohio) =

Historic building in Columbus, Ohio

- U.S. Post Office and Courthouse
- U.S. National Register of Historic Places
- Columbus Register of Historic Properties
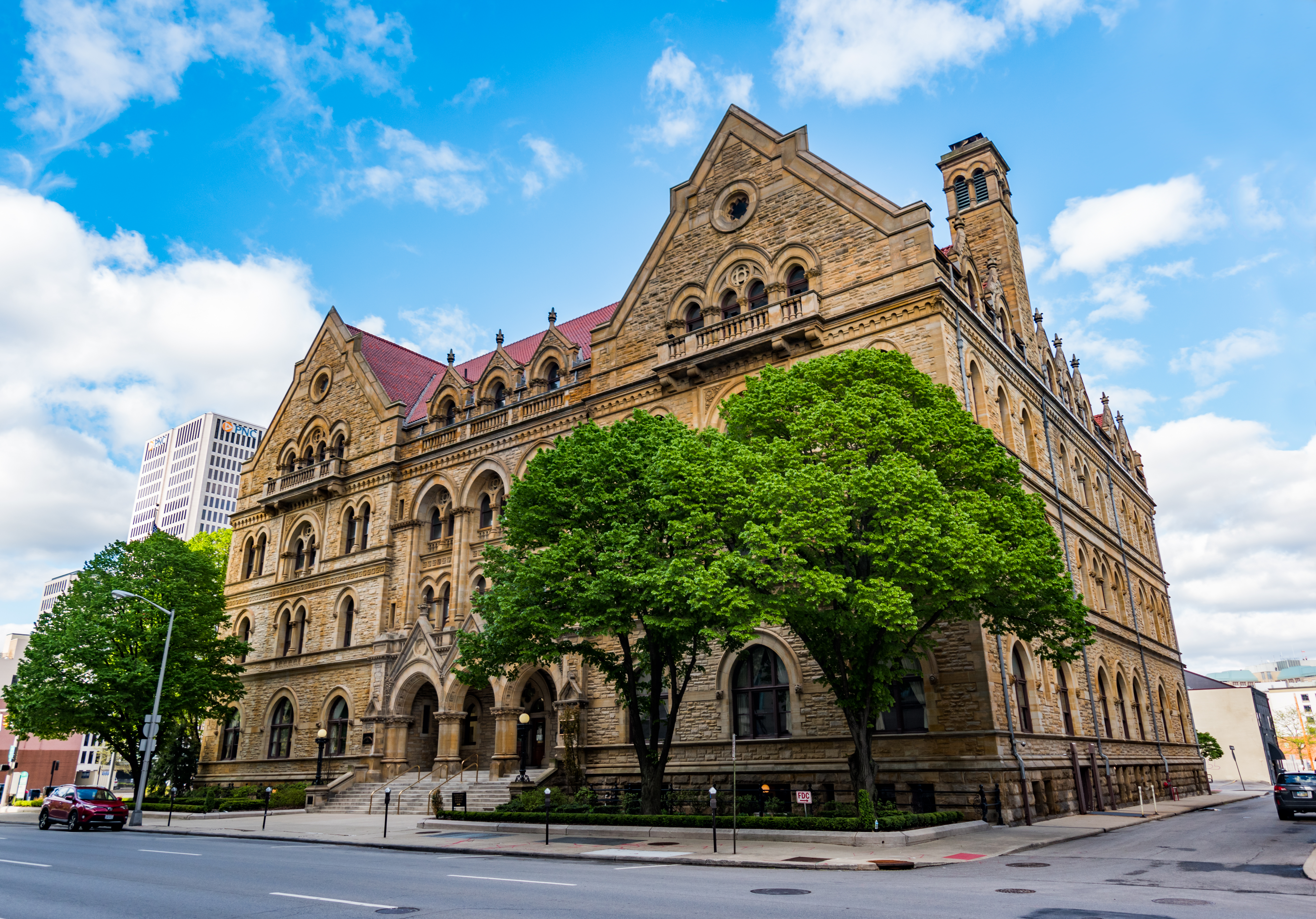
- Interactive map highlighting the building's location
- Location: 121 E. State St., Columbus, Ohio
- Coordinates: 39°57′36″N 82°59′49″W
- Area: 0.8 acres (0.32 ha)
- Built: 1884-1887
- Architect: John T. Harris, James Knox Taylor, Böhm-NBBJ
- Architectural style: Romanesque Revival, High Victorian Gothic
- NRHP reference No.: 73001441
- CRHP No.: CR-3

Significant dates
- Added to NRHP: April 11, 1973
- Designated CRHP: April 12, 1982

The United States Post Office and Courthouse is a historic building in Downtown Columbus, Ohio. The structure was built from 1884 to 1887 as the city's main post office. The building also served as a courthouse of the United States District Court for the Southern District of Ohio from its completion in 1887 until 1934, when the court moved to the Joseph P. Kinneary United States Courthouse. The building was tripled in size from 1907 to 1912, and was rehabilitated for use as the Bricker & Eckler law offices in 1986, and today houses the same law firm.

The building was listed on the National Register of Historic Places in 1973 and the Columbus Register of Historic Properties in 1982.

== Attributes ==
It is a three-and-a-half-story building, originally designed in the Romanesque Revival style by John T. Harris. It was expanded to three times its original size from 1907 to 1912, in a thorough process that unified old and new portions in the High Victorian Gothic style; the architect of record was James Knox Taylor. The building utilizes tan rock-faced Berea sandstone, with trim of smooth sandstone. The building has round-arched windows topped with heavy hoodmolds, and projecting stone bands between its floors. The 1900s addition was built to the south of the original structure, using the same type of stone. New elements added include pointed arches, buttresses, and Gothic ornamentation. The building has a red tile roof, replacing an original slate roof.

== History ==
The structure was built from 1884 to 1887 as the city's main post office. The building also served as a courthouse of the United States District Court for the Southern District of Ohio from its completion in 1887 until 1934, when the court moved to the Joseph P. Kinneary United States Courthouse. Federal offices and the post office moved to the Bricker Federal Building around 1977. The building was rehabilitated for use as the Bricker & Eckler law offices in 1986, designed by Böhm-NBBJ, and today houses the same law firm.

The building was listed on the National Register of Historic Places in 1973 and the Columbus Register of Historic Properties in 1982.

== Gallery ==
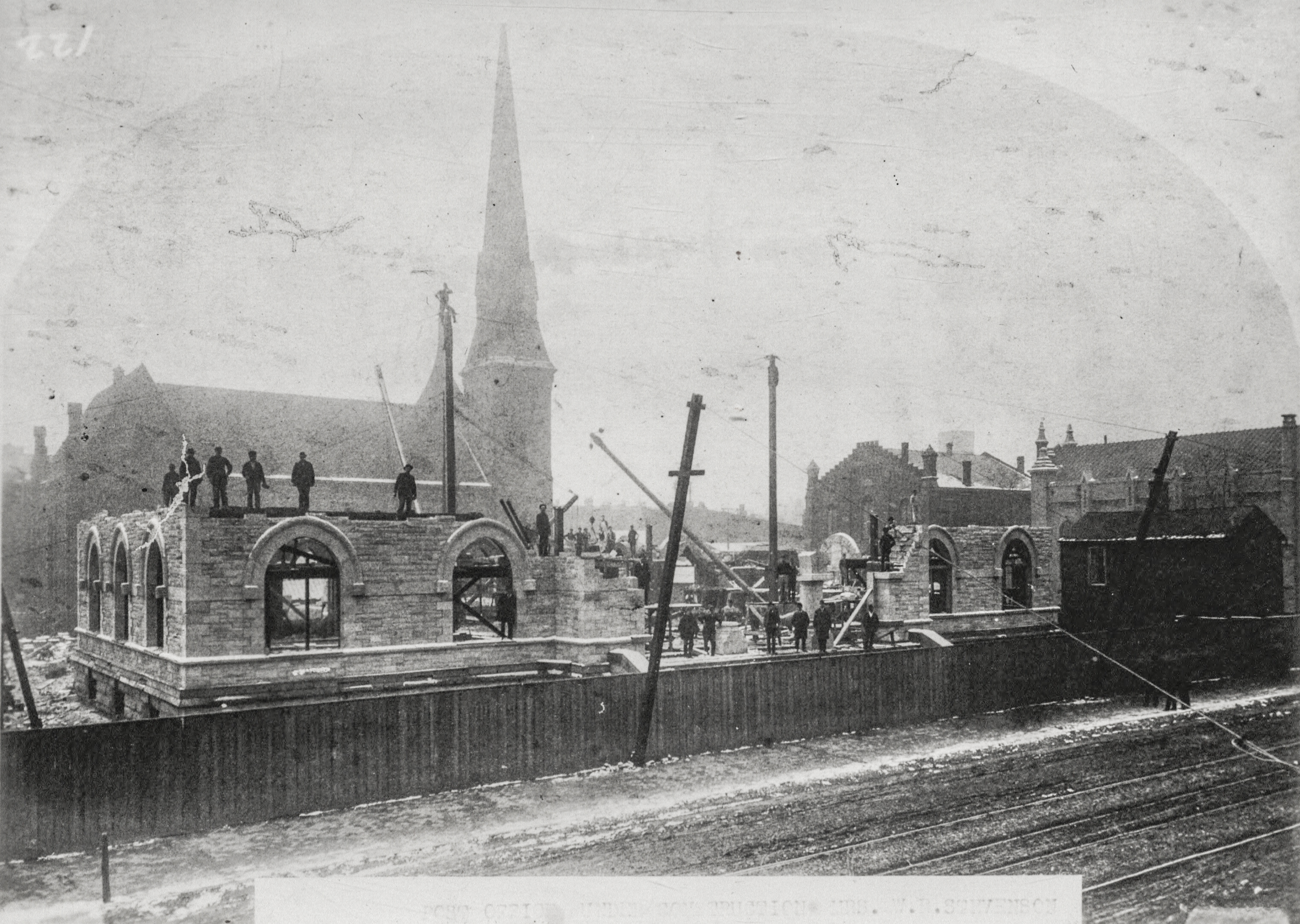
Constructing the building

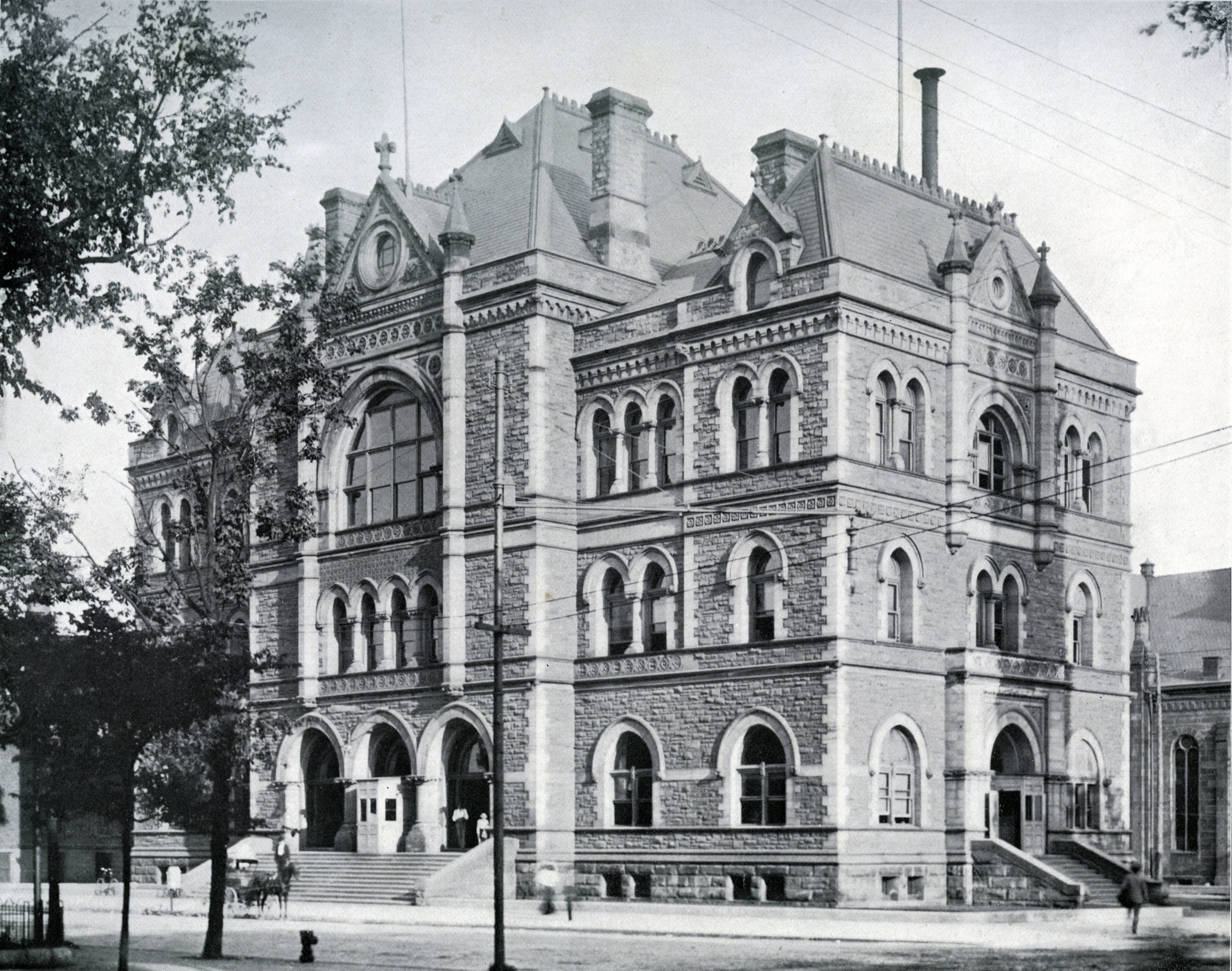
The building as originally built, c. 1900

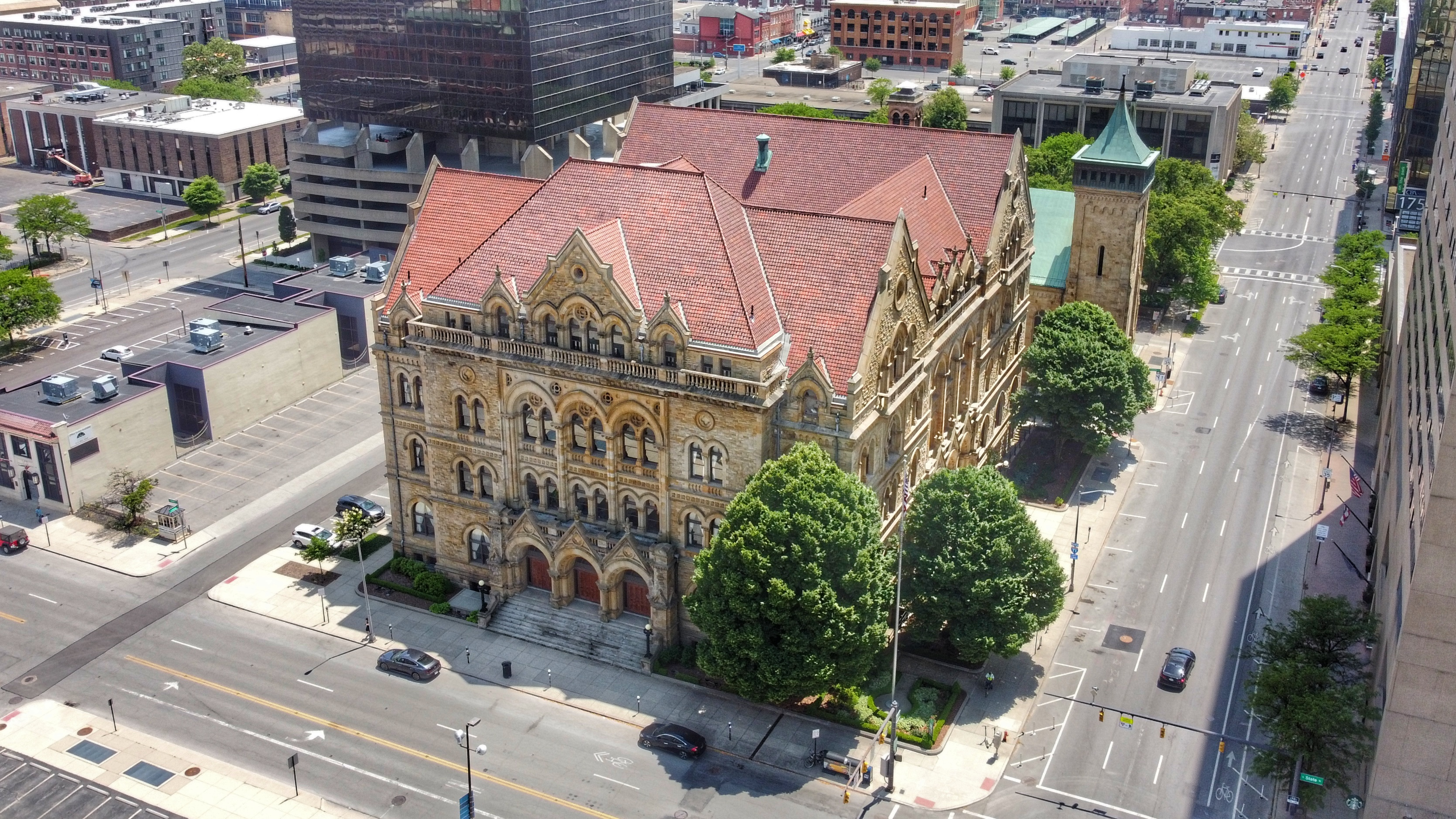
Aerial view

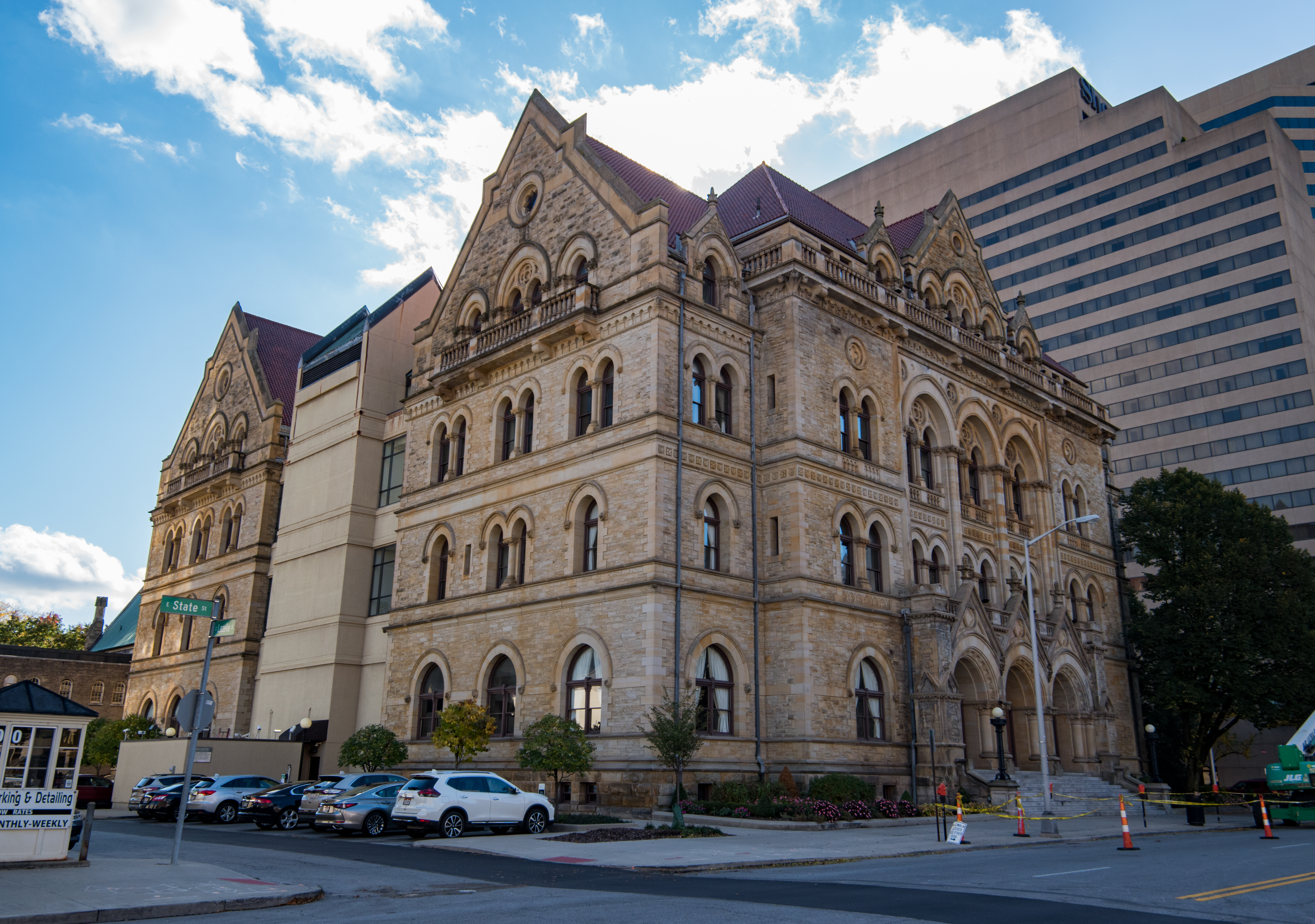
East side with 1986 addition

== See also ==
- List of United States federal courthouses in Ohio
- National Register of Historic Places listings in Columbus, Ohio
