= -ji =

Suffix in languages of the Indian subcontinent

-ji (जी ਜੀ جی IAST: -jī, Hindustani pronunciation: [dʒiː]) is a gender-neutral honorific used as a suffix in many languages of the Indian subcontinent, such as Hindustani (Hindi-Urdu), Nepali, Sindhi and Punjabi languages and their dialects prevalent in north India, northwest and central India.

Ji is gender-neutral and can be used for as a term of respect for person, relationships or inanimate objects as well. Its usage is similar, but not identical, to another subcontinental honorific, sāhab. It is similar to the gender-neutral Japanese honorific -san.

== Etymology ==
The origin of the ji honorific is uncertain. One suggestion is that it is a borrowing from an Austroasiatic language such as Sora. Another is that the term means "soul" or "life" or "sir" (similar to the jān suffix or śrī suffix) and is derived from Sanskrit. Harsh K. Luthar gives examples of ji in Master-ji, Guru-ji, and Mata-ji. The use of -ji is also used by Urdu speakers who associate with Indian culture and language.

== Variant spellings ==
- jee – Anglicised spelling, common in old publications.
- jii – example: Ánandamúrtijii, founder of Ánanda Márga.
- jiew – example: Shankari Mai Jiew in Yogananda's Autobiography of a Yogi.
- joo – example: Lakshman Joo of Kashmir.
- jiu – example: Radha Raman Jiu temples in Bengal and Uttar Pradesh.
- jyu – transliteration of Nepali ज्यू
- zi/zee – Eastern Bengali and Assamese pronunciation

== Usage ==
-ji can mean respect:

- With names, e.g. Gandhiji, Nehruji, Modiji, Rahulji, Sant Ji or Shivji
- With inanimate objects of respect, e.g. Gangaji or Kailashji
- For groups to whom respect is extended, e.g. Khalsa Ji, Sangat Ji
- To denote respect in any relation, e.g. Mata-ji ("respected mother"), Baba-ji or Pita-ji ("respected father"), Uncle-ji or Chacha-ji or Mama-ji, Behen-ji ("respected sister"), Devi-ji ("respected madam"), Bhabhi-ji ("respected sister-in-law"), Guru-ji ("respected master"), Pandit-ji ("Scholar Sir"), Hakim-ji ("respected doctor/Hakim")
- In conversation, e.g. Ji Nahi (No, said with respect)
- In polite conversation, e.g. Navraj Ji (Mr. Navraj, similar to how it would be said in Japanese, Navraj-san)
- As a shorthand for yes or to denote respectful attention, Ji
- To reassure that a request has been understood and will be complied with, Ji-Ji!
- To respectfully ask for clarification, Ji? (With a questioning tone. In idiom, similar to the English "I beg your pardon?")
- In Parsi (Zoroastrian) names, e.g. in Jamsetji Tata, or Field Marshal Sam Hormusji Framji Jamshedji Manekshaw

== Contrast with Ṣāḥib ==
Ṣāḥib (or Ṣāḥib or Ṣāḥeb) is always used for an individual, never for an inanimate object or group, though the plural term Ṣāḥibān exists as well for more than one person. Ṣāḥab is also never used as a shorthand to express agreement, disagreement or ask clarification (whereas "Ji" is, as in Ji, Ji Nahi or Ji?). Sometimes, the two terms can be combined to Ṣāḥab Jī to indicate a high degree of respect, roughly equivalent to Respected Sir.

One important exception where Ṣāḥab is used for inanimate objects is in connection with Sikh shrines, places and scripture, e.g. Harmandir Sahib and Adi Guru Granth Sahib.

== Contrast with Jān ==
Jān is also a commonly used suffix in the subcontinent, but it (and the variants, jānī and jānū) denotes endearment rather than respect and, in some contexts, can denote intimacy or even a romantic relationship. Due to these connotations of intimacy, the subcontinental etiquette surrounding jān is more complex than the usage of the same term in Persian, where it is used somewhat more liberally (though even there, restrictions apply).

As a standalone term, jān is the rough equivalent of darling, and is used almost exclusively for close relatives (such as spouses, lovers and children). In this context, sometimes colloquial forms such as jānū and jānā, or combination words such as Jān-i-man (my darling) and Jān-i-jān(a) (roughly, "love of my life"), are also used. When used with a name or a relation-term, it means "dear". So, bhāi-sāhab and bhāī-jī carry the meaning of respected brother, whereas bhāī-jān, bhaiyā-jānū or bhaiyā-jānī mean dear brother. The term mērī jān, roughly meaning my dear, can be used with friends of the same gender, or in intimate relationships with the opposite gender. In subcontinental etiquette, while bhāī-jān can be used by males to denote a brotherly relation with any other male of a roughly similar age including total strangers (the female equivalent between women is apā-jān or dīdī-jān), mērī jān is used only with friends with whom informality has been established. -jī, on the other hand, is appropriate in all these situations and across genders because it carries no connotations of intimacy.

== Popular conflation with the letter G ==
Because English usage is widespread in the Indian subcontinent, the fact that the honorific -ji is pronounced identically to the letter G is used extensively in puns. This is sometimes deliberately exploited in consumer marketing, such as with the popular "Parle-G Biscuits" (where the "G" ostensibly stands for 'Glucose'), which sounds like Parle Ji Biscuits (or, 'the respected Parle biscuits'). A pun popular with children in North India and Pakistan consists entirely of Latin letters BBG T PO G, which is pronounced very similarly to Bibi-ji, Tea pi-o ji, "respected ma'am, please have some tea". Some people add an "A" or "O" at the start as if a person is speaking to the Bibi-ji in a friendly way used in various regional types slangs of India: O BBG T PO G or ABBG T PO G. The Bibi-ji may answer PKIG, "I just had the tea". You can also see Gmail transliterated as जीमेल (Ji Mail, "respected mail").

Bengali names ending in -ji are sometimes rendered in Sanskrit as -ōpadhyay (-a-upādhyāya with sandhi, i.e. Mukherjee and Mukhōpādhyay). Upādhyāya is Sanskrit for "teacher" (also a surname).

== See also ==
- Shri
- Sahib
