= Mukherjee =

Indian surname

Origin
- Origin: Bengali Hindu
- Region of origin: Bengal

Other names
- Variant forms: Mukharjee, Mookerjea, Mukherji, Mukhujje

Mukherjee (Bengali: মূখার্জি), also Mukharjee, Mookerjea, Mookerjee, Mukerji, Mukherji, Mukhujje or Mookherjee, is a Bengali Hindu Kulin Brahmin surname originating from the Bengal region of the Indian subcontinent. The traditional Bengali version is Mukhopaddhae, which is sometimes written Mukhopadhyay.

== Origins ==
All Mukherjees belong to the Bharadvaja gotra or the clan of the rishi Bharadvaja. The Mukherjees belong to the Kulin Brahmin class and are also classified as Rarhi Brahmin group of Bengali Brahmin caste. The origins of most of the Brahmins in Southern Bengal can be traced back to the Gangetic plains of Northern India, from the ancient city of Kanyakubja (Kannauj). It is believed that in the 11th century CE, the ruler of Bengal, Adisara, summoned five Brahmins from Kanyakubja, who were known for their superior rank to the region. These Vedic Brahmins were supposed to have nine gunas (favoured attributes), among which was insistence on same rank marriages.

== Notable people with the last name Mukherjee ==
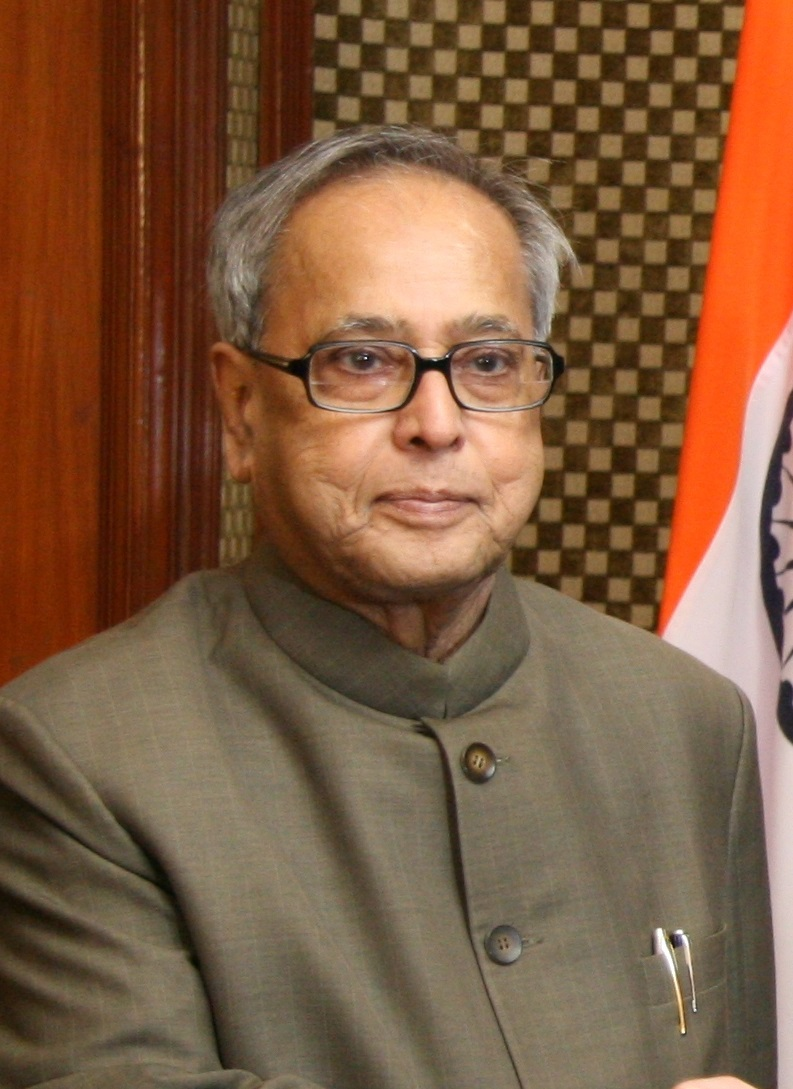
Pranab Mukherjee - 13th President of India

=== A ===
- Aarti Mukherji, singer
- Abaninath Mukherji, revolutionary and co-founder of the Communist Party of India
- Abhijit Mukherjee (born 1960), politician
- Abir Mukherjee, writer
- Ajoy Mukherjee, fourth chief minister of West Bengal, India
- Alok Mukherjee
- Ankit Mukherjee, footballer.
- Arko Pravo Mukherjee, Indian singer-songwriter
- Arindam Mukherjee, photojournalist
- Arundhati Mukherjee, actress
- Ashutosh Mukherjee, writer
- Anirban Mukhopadhyay, marketing scholar
- Asim Mukhopadhyay, historian
- Ayan Mukherjee, director
- Sir Ashutosh Mukherjee (1864–1924) Educationist, Vice-Chancellor of the University of Calcutta (1906–1924), and referred commonly as 'Bengal Tiger'.
- Asoke Kumar Mukerji, Indian Foreign Service (diplomat)

=== B ===
- Banaphool (Balaichand Mukherjee)
- Balaram Mukhopadhyay, chemist
- Banibrata Mukhopadhyay, astrophysicist
- Barun Mukherjee, politician
- Bela Mukhopadhyay, writer
- Benode Behari Mukherjee (1904–1980), painter
- Bharati Mukherjee (born 1940), writer
- Bhramar Mukherjee, Indian-American biostatistician, data scientist
- Bijan Kumar Mukherjea (1891–1956), judge
- Biswanath Mukherjee, computer scientist
- Budhaditya Mukherjee (born 1955), musician
- Bhasha Mukherjee - Miss England 2019

=== C ===
- Chandrani Mukherjee, singer
- Chayan Mukherjee, IPS officer

=== D ===
- Debashis Mukherjee, theoretical chemist
- Dhan Gopal Mukerji (1890–1936)
- Dwijen Mukherjee, Tagore song exponent

=== H ===
- Hemanta Kumar Mukhopadhyay (1920–1989), music director
- Hrishikesh Mukherjee (1922–2006), director
- Harendra Coomar Mookerjee, Vice-President of Constituent Assembly of India

=== I ===
- Indrani Mukherjea, former HR Consultant and media executive
- Indrani Mukherjee, actress

=== J ===
- Jadugopal Mukherjee (1886–1976), revolutionary
- Jaidip Mukerjea (born 1942), tennis player
- Jatindra Nath Mukherjee (Bagha Jatin) (1879–1915), Freedom Fighter and Revolutionary Leader
- Jiban Mukhopadhyay (died 2025), politician
- Joia Mukherjee (born 1964), physician
- Jolly Mukherjee, singer, songwriter, producer
- Joy Mukherjee (1939–2012), actor and director

=== K ===
- Kajol Mukherjee, Bollywood actress
- Kalyan Mukherjea, classical musician
- Kalyan Mukherjee, politician
- Kamaleshwar Mukherjee, director
- Kamalinee Mukherjee, actress
- Kashinath Mukherjee, classical musician
- Keshto Mukherjee, comedian and actor

=== L ===
- Leela Mukherjee (1916–2002), artist

=== M ===
- Maahi Mukherjee, singer and songwriter
- Madhabi Mukherjee, actor
- Manabendra Mukherjee, singer
- Mahua Mukherjee, dancer
- Manas Mukherjee, singer and composer
- Mani Shankar Mukherjee, writer
- Manoj Kumar Mukherjee, Indian jurist
- Mrinalini Mukherjee, sculptor
- Mithu Mukherjee (cricketer), former cricketer
- Mohua Mukherjee (born August 1952), author and activist
- Monu Mukhopadhyay (1930–2020), Indian film and television actor
- Mitali Mukherjee, Bangladeshi singer

=== N ===
- Nandini Mukherjee, computer scientist
- Neel Mukherjee, writer
- Nibaran Chandra Mukherjee, Brahmo reformer
- Nihar Mukherjee, former General Secretary of the Socialist Unity Centre of India party
- Nirmal Kumar Mukarji, former Cabinet Secretary of India and former Governor of Punjab (India)

=== P ===
- Pranab Mukherjee, 13th President of India
- Prasun Mukherjee, police commissioner
- Prasun Kumar Mukherjee, managing director of Sesa Goa Limited
- Prithwindra Mukherjee, author and researcher
- Pratul Mukherjee, Bengali-language singer and composer
- Pulok Mukherjee, pharmacist

=== R ===
- Raghu Mukherjee, film director and model
- Rahul Mukerjee, academic and statistician
- Raj Mukherji, American businessman, lawyer, and politician
- Rajendra Nath Mookerjee, industrialist
- Ram Kamal Mukherjee, journalist, historian, and author
- Ram Mukherjee, film director, producer, and screenwriter; Rani's father
- Rani Mukerji, Bollywood actress
- Reshmi Mukherjee, astrophysicist
- Robin Mukherjee, Indian cricketer
- Rudrangshu Mukherjee, historian and author
- Rwitobroto Mukherjee, film and theatre actor

=== S ===
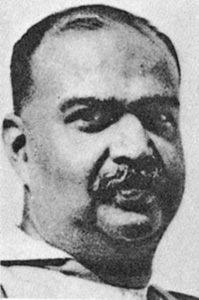
Syama Prasad Mookerjee: The founder Bharatiya Jana Sangh which would later evolve into Bharatiya Janata Party, the current ruling party of India.

- Sabyasachi Mukherjee (born 1974), fashion designer
- Sabyasachi Mukharji (born 1927), Chief Justice of India
- Sagarika Mukherjee (born 1970), singer and actress
- Samhita Mukhopadhyay (born 1978), writer and journalist
- Sandeep Mukherjee (born 1964), Indian-American artist
- Sandhya Mukhopadhyay (born 1931), singer and musician
- Sangram Mukherjee (born 1981), football player
- Sapna Mukherjee, singer
- Sarada Devi (Saradamani Mukhopadhyaya)
- Sarah Mukherjee (born 1967), correspondent
- Sashadhar Mukherjee (died 1990), producer
- Satish Chandra Mukherjee (1865–1948), educator
- Satyabrata Mookherjee (born 1932), politician
- Savitri Devi Mukherji (1905–1982), French-born Greek fascist, Nazi sympathizer, and spy
- Shantanu Mukherjee (born 1972), singer and actor
- Shantilal Mukherjee, actor in Bengali theatre and films
- Sharbani Mukherjee, actress
- Sharda Mukherjee (born 1919), Governor & w/o Subroto Mukerjee
- Shiboprosad Mukherjee (born 1974), film director, writer and actor
- Shirshendu Mukhopadhyay (born 1935), author
- Shomu Mukherjee, Kajol's Father, director
- Shyam Mukherjee, filmmaker
- Shyam Mukherjee, politician
- Syama Prasad Mukherjee (1901–1953), politician
- Shyamaprasad Mukherjee, statistician
- Syamadas Mukhopadhyaya, mathematician
- Siddhartha Mukherjee (born 1970), physician
- Sreelekha Mukherji, actress
- Srijit Mukherji, director
- Subhash Mukhopadhyay, poet
- Subhash Mukhopadhyay (physician) or Subhas Mukherjee
- Subodh Mukherjee (1921–2005), filmmaker
- Subrata Mukherjee (1946-2021), politician
- Subroto Mukerjee, first Air Chief Marshal of Independent India
- Sujit Mukherjee, cricketer and writer
- Sujan Mukhopadhyay, film, television and theatre actor
- Suman Mukhopadhyay, filmmaker and theatre director
- Suroopa Mukherjee, author
- Sushmita Mukherjee, actress
- Swastika Mukherjee (born 1980), actress

=== T ===
- Tanisha Mukherjee, Tanisha, actress, Kajol's sister
- Tanuja Mukherjee
- Tathagata Mukherjee (born 1985), actor
- Troilokyanath Mukhopadhyay

=== U ===
- Udayan Mukherjee, journalist

== See also ==
- 25629 Mukherjee
- Kulin Brahmins
- Mukherjee-Samarth family
- Mukherjee Commission
