= Mookerjee =

Mookerjee is a surname. Notable people with the surname include:

- Harendra Coomar Mookerjee (1877–1956), the Governor of West Bengal from 1951 to 1956
- Rajen Mookerjee, KCIE, KCVO, a pioneering Indian industrialist
- Syama Prasad Mookerjee (1901–1953), minister in Pandit Jawaharlal Nehru's Cabinet as a Minister for Industry and Supply

== See also ==
- Mukherjee, one of several alternative spellings, for a full discussion of the history of the name
