= List of United States federal courthouses in Ohio =

Following is a list of current and former courthouses of the United States federal court system located in Ohio. Each entry indicates the name of the building along with an image, if available, its location and the jurisdiction it covers, the dates during which it was used for each such jurisdiction, and, if applicable the person for whom it was named, and the date of renaming. Dates of use will not necessarily correspond with the dates of construction or demolition of a building, as pre-existing structures may be adapted or court use, and former court buildings may later be put to other uses. Also, the official name of the building may be changed at some point after its use as a federal court building has been initiated.

== Courthouses ==
Courthouse	City	Image	Street address	Jurisdiction	Dates of use	Named for
John F. Seiberling Federal Building & U.S. Courthouse	Akron		2 South Main Street	N.D. Ohio	1974–present	U.S. Rep. John F. Seiberling
Frank T. Bow Federal Building & U.S. Courthouse	Canton		201 Cleveland Avenue South	N.D. Ohio	1933–2010	U.S. Rep. Frank T. Bow
Ralph Regula Federal Building & U.S. Courthouse	Canton		401 McKinley Avenue SW	N.D. Ohio	2010–present	U.S. Rep. Ralph Regula
U.S. Custom House and Post Office	Cincinnati		100 East Fifth Street	S.D. Ohio; 6th Cir.	1885–1936; Razed in 1936.	n/a
Potter Stewart U.S. Courthouse^{†}	Cincinnati		100 East Fifth Street	S.D. Ohio	1938–present	Supreme Court Justice Potter Stewart (1994)
Howard M. Metzenbaum U.S. Courthouse†	Cleveland		201 Superior Avenue	N.D. Ohio	1911–present	U.S. Sen. Howard Metzenbaum
Carl B. Stokes Federal Court House Building	Cleveland		801 West Superior Avenue	N.D. Ohio	2002–present	Cleveland mayor Carl Stokes
U.S. Court House and Post Office^{†}	Columbus		121 East State Street	S.D. Ohio	1887–1934	n/a
Joseph P. Kinneary U.S. Courthouse	Columbus		85 Marconi Boulevard	S.D. Ohio	1934–present	District Court judge Joseph Peter Kinneary (1998)
U.S. Post Office	Dayton		?	S.D. Ohio	1907–? Demolished.	n/a
U.S. Post Office and Courthouse†	Dayton		120 West 3rd Street	S.D. Ohio	1915–ca. 1976; 1995–present	n/a
Walter H. Rice Federal Building and United States Courthouse	Dayton		200 West Second Street	S.D. Ohio	1976–present	Walter Herbert Rice
U.S. Post Office and Courthouse	Steubenville		North 4th and Washington Streets	S.D. Ohio	1925–?	n/a
U.S. Custom House and Post Office	Toledo		?	N.D. Ohio	1888–1932; Demolished in 1964.	n/a
James M. Ashley & Thomas W.L. Ashley U.S. Courthouse^{†}	Toledo		1716 Spielbusch	N.D. Ohio	1932–present	U.S. Rep. James Mitchell Ashley and U.S. Rep. Thomas W. L. Ashley
U.S. Post Office and Courthouse†	Youngstown		9 West Front Street	N.D. Ohio	1933–? Now used by the city.	n/a
Thomas D. Lambros Federal Building & U.S. Courthouse	Youngstown		125 Market Street	N.D. Ohio	1995–present	District Court judge Thomas Demetrios Lambros
Nathaniel R. Jones Federal Building & U.S. Courthouse	Youngstown		10 East Commerce Street	N.D. Ohio	2002–present	Court of Appeals judge Nathaniel R. Jones
U.S. Post Office & Federal Building†	Zanesville		65 South Fifth Street	S.D. Ohio	1904–? Still in use as a post office.	n/a

== Key ==
^{†}	Listed on the National Register of Historic Places (NRHP)
^{††}	NRHP-listed and also designated as a National Historic Landmark
