= J. Ramachandran =

Indian corporate strategist

- Born: India
- Occupations: Academic, corporate leader
- Title: Chairman & Non Executive Director at Redington Limited ; Senior Professor of Corporate Strategy (retired)
- Board member of: Redington Limited; Aditya Auto Products and Engineering; Reliance Communications; Sasken Technologies; MVA Group International; Allcargo Logistics; Antrix Corporation; Tejas Networks

Academic background
- Education: Indian Institute of Management Ahmedabad (Fellow); Institute of Chartered Accountants of India (ACA); Institute of Cost Accountants of India (ACMA)

Academic work
- Discipline: Strategic Management
- Institutions: Indian Institute of Management Bangalore
- Notable works: "Why Conglomerates Thrive (Outside the US)"

J. Ramachandran is an Indian academic and corporate leader. He is the chairman and non-executive director of Redington Limited and a former professor of corporate strategy at the Indian Institute of Management Bangalore (IIMB), where he taught for three decades. In 2006, Business Today included him in a list of leading business school professors in India.

Ramachandran's research focuses on corporate strategy, corporate governance, and the growth of firms in emerging economies. His work has been published in academic journals including the Harvard Business Review, Strategic Management Journal, Organization Science, Journal of International Business Studies, Journal of Management Studies, Global Strategy Journal, and Journal of Product Innovation and Management. He was listed amongst the Best Management Thinkers in India by Thinkers50 India List.

== Early life and education ==
Ramachandran qualified as a chartered accountant, cost accountant, and company secretary. He is an associate member of the Institute of Chartered Accountants of India (ICAI), the Institute of Cost Accountants of India (ICMAI), and the Institute of Company Secretaries of India (ICSI). He earned his doctoral degree as a Fellow of the Indian Institute of Management Ahmedabad.

== Academic career ==
Ramachandran joined IIM Bangalore in 1992 and taught corporate strategy and policy for over three decades, retiring as Senior Professor of Corporate Strategy. He has held visiting positions at INSEAD, the Wharton School of the University of Pennsylvania, and the Carlson School of Management, University of Minnesota.

== Research and publications ==
Ramachandran's research focuses on the growth and governance of firms in emerging economies. His paper on identity duality in multinational subsidiaries received the IMD FDC Award for Best Paper in Strategy/IB Theory from the Academy of Management. Another of his papers, which advocated for the use of case studies over variance studies in emerging markets research, was nominated for the Carolyn Dexter Best International Paper Award.

His 2013 Harvard Business Review article, "Why Conglomerates Thrive (Outside the US)," has been identified by the publisher as a top-selling title. In 2012, his research regarding the Indian software services industry was noted as being among the 100 most-cited papers in the Global Strategy Journal.

=== Teaching cases ===
Ramachandran has authored numerous teaching cases distributed through Harvard Business Publishing, several of which are used in business school curricula globally. He has received awards for his cases from the European Foundation for Management Development (EFMD), the Central and East European Management Development Association (CEEMAN), the Association of Management Development Institutions in South Asia (AMDISA), and the Association of Indian Management Schools (AIMS). His study of Fabindia received the Tata Steel Best Case Award.

In the field of executive education, Ramachandran has designed and directed leadership programs in collaboration with the MIT Sloan School of Management and the Tuck School of Business at Dartmouth. He has also served as a corporate trainer and consultant for several companies, including 3M India, Castrol India, Siemens India, Infosys, and Wipro.

== Corporate presence ==
=== Redington Limited ===
Ramachandran was appointed chairman of Redington Limited in 2006. He is credited with overseeing the company's transition from a founder-led to a board-led governance structure. During his chairmanship, the company went public in 2007 and expanded as a global distributor of information technology products.

=== Other board roles ===
He has served as a director on the boards of Reliance Communications, Sasken Communication Technologies, Allcargo Logistics, Antrix Corporation, and Tejas Networks. He was also chairman of Aditya Auto Products and Engineering. In the non-profit and academic sector, he has been on the Governance Council of the Mudra Institute of Communications, Ahmedabad (MICA) and the editorial board of the Journal of Entrepreneurship.

== Selected publications ==
=== Papers ===
- Ramachandran, J.; Gopal, S.; Manikandan, K. S. (2021). "Are there limits to diversification in emerging economies? Distinguishing between firm-level and business group strategies." Journal of Management Studies. 58 (6). doi:10.1111/joms.12680
- Ramachandran, J.; Patvardhan, S. (2020). "Shaping the Future: Strategy Making as Artificial Evolution." Organization Science. 31 (3). doi:10.1287/orsc.2019.1321
- Ramachandran, J.; Pant, A. (2017). "Navigating identity duality in multinational subsidiaries: A paradox lens on identity claims at Hindustan Unilever, 1959–2015." Journal of International Business Studies. 48: 664–692. doi:10.1057/s41267-017-0076-x
- Ramachandran, J.; Manikandan, K. S. (2015). "Beyond institutional voids: Business groups, incomplete markets, and organizational form." Strategic Management Journal. 36 (4): 598–617. doi:10.1002/smj.2226
- Ramachandran, J.; Manikandan, K. S.; Pant, A. (2013). "Why do conglomerates thrive (outside the U.S.)?" Harvard Business Review. 91 (12): 111–119.
- Ramachandran, J.; Pant, A. (2012). "Legitimacy beyond borders: Indian software services firms in the United States, 1984–2004." Global Strategy Journal. 2: 224–243. doi:10.1111/j.2042-5805.2012.01037.x
- Ramachandran, J.; Pant, A.; Pani, S. (2012). "Building the BOP producer ecosystem: The evolving engagement of Fabindia with Indian handloom artisans." Journal of Product Innovation Management. 29 (1): 33–51. doi:10.1111/j.1540-5885.2011.00877.x
- Ramachandran, J.; Manikandan, K. S. (2012). "Growth and persistence of business groups in emerging markets: Towards solving the puzzle." Academy of Management Proceedings. doi:10.5465/AMBPP.2012.93
- Ramachandran, J.; Pant, A. (2011). "How do subsidiaries confront institutional duality? Identity claims at Hindustan Lever, 1961–2009." Academy of Management Proceedings. doi:10.5465/ambpp.2011.65870610
- Ramachandran, J.; Pant, A. (2010). "The liabilities of origin: An emerging economy perspective on the costs of doing business abroad." In Devinney, T. M.; Pedersen, T.; Tihanyi, L. (eds.), Advances in International Management: The Past, Present and Future of International Business and Management, Vol. 23. New York: Emerald. doi:10.1108/S1571-5027(2010)00000230017
- Ramachandran, J.; Pant, A.; Gunta, S. (2008). "Research in emerging economies: Reading small type in dim light in a speeding train?" Academy of Management Proceedings. doi:10.5465/ambpp.2008.33662184

=== Teaching cases ===
- Ramachandran, J.; Ramesh, S.; Manikandan, K. S. (2021). The House of Tata: Governance Challenges (A). IIM Bangalore.
- Ramachandran, J.; Ramesh, S.; Manikandan, K. S. (2021). The House of Tata: Governance Challenges (B). IIM Bangalore.
- Ramachandran, J.; Ramesh, S.; Shah, P. (2021). Motherson Sumi Systems Limited: Rewiring the Ownership Structure. IIM Bangalore.
- Ramachandran, J.; Bajaj, N. (2021). The Art of Living: Celebrating Life. IIM Bangalore.
- Ramachandran, J.; Ramesh, S. (2020). Sun Pharmaceutical Industries Limited: Disclosure Practices. IIM Bangalore.
- Ramachandran, J.; Ramesh, S. (2020). Yes Bank Limited: Too Big to Fail?. IIM Bangalore.
- Ramachandran, J.; Dutta, S. (2020). Mindtree Limited: Hostile Acquisition. IIM Bangalore.
- Ramachandran, J.; Pradhan, D. (2020). Infosys Limited: Governance Imbroglio. IIM Bangalore.
- Ramachandran, J.; Garg, J. (2019). Asian Paints Limited: Painting History. IIM Bangalore.
- Ramachandran, J.; Garg, P. (2019). Hindustan Unilever Limited (A): Growing with India. IIM Bangalore.
- Ramachandran, J.; Garg, P.; Kashyap, B. (2019). Hindustan Unilever Limited (B): Winning in Many Indias. IIM Bangalore.
- Ramachandran, J.; Garg, P.; Kashyap, B. (2019). Hindustan Unilever Limited (C): Boosting Growth in India. IIM Bangalore.
- Ramachandran, J.; Manikandan, K. S.; Rajyalakshmi, K. (2016). Leading the Tata Group (A): The Ratan Tata Years. IIM Bangalore.
- Ramachandran, J.; Manikandan, K. S. (2016). Leading the Tata Group (B): The Cyrus Mistry Years. IIM Bangalore.
- Ramachandran, J.; Manukonda, S.; Awate, K. (2016). Ranbaxy Limited: Changing Aspirations. IIM Bangalore.
- Ramachandran, J.; Garg, P. (2016). i-flex Solutions (A): Winning Unconventionally. IIM Bangalore.
- Ramachandran, J.; Garg, P. (2016). i-flex Solutions (B): The Oracle Years. IIM Bangalore.
- Ramachandran, J.; Krishnamurthy, R.; Garg, P. (2016). Indian Software Services Industry: The Changing Landscape. IIM Bangalore.
- Ramachandran, J.; Gupta, S. (2016). DDB Mudra Group (A): Transformative Growth. IIM Bangalore.
- Ramachandran, J.; Gupta, S. (2016). DDB Mudra Group (B): Profitable Growth. IIM Bangalore.
- Ramachandran, J.; Gupta, S. (2013). "The Park Hotels: Communicating Experience." Asian Case Research Journal. 17 (2): 199–224.
- Ramachandran, J.; Manikandan, K. S. (2012). ITC Limited: India First. IIM Bangalore.
- Ramachandran, J.; Gupta, S. (2010). The Park Hotels: Designing Experience. IIM Bangalore.
