= Institute of Cost Accountants of India =

Professional Cost and Management Accounting body in India

The Institute of Cost Accountants of India
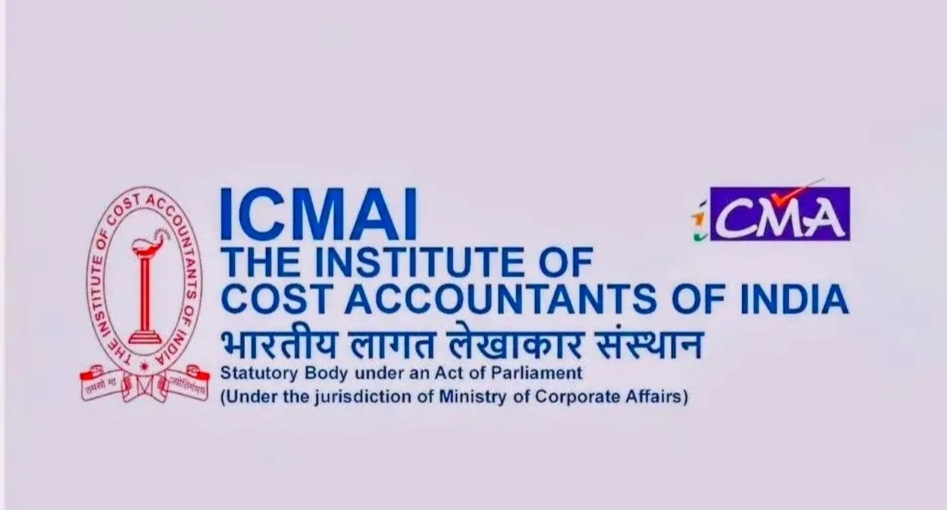
- Abbreviation: ICMAI
- Formation: 28 May 1959; 67 years ago
- Legal status: Established under the Cost and Works Accountants Act, 1959 Statutory body enacted by the Parliament of India
- Headquarters: CMA Bhawan, 12 Sudder Street, Kolkata – 700016, India. ( till 2024-25 ) CMA Bhawan 3, Institutional Area Lodhi Road, New Delhi - 110003, India (since 2025-26)
- Coordinates: 22.558103°N 88.353672°E
- Region served: India
- Members: 100,000
- President: CMA Chittaranjan Chattopadhyay
- Vice-President: CMA Manoj Kumar Anand
- Secretary: CMA Dr. Debaprosanna Nandy
- Parent organization: Ministry of Corporate Affairs, Government of India
- Students: 750,000 (Approx)
- Website: www.icmai.in
- Formerly called: The Institute of Cost & Works Accountants of India

The Institute of Cost Accountants of India (ICMAI), which was previously known as the Institute of Cost & Works Accountants of India (ICWAI), is a professional accountancy body under the Ministry of Corporate Affairs, Government of India. It has as its prime responsibility, as assigned by the Ministry, to promote and develop the cost and management accounting profession at the global level.

== History ==
The Institute of Cost Accountants of India was first formed as a registered limited company on 14 June 1944 under the provisions of the Companies Act of 1913. Post Independence, the Institute received statutory recognition when the Parliament of India enacted "The Cost and Works Accountants Act, 1959" (Act No.23rd of 1959), a special act, on 28 May 1959 to accord statutory recognition to ICWAI (now ICMAI) as an autonomous professional Institute.

The CWA Amendment bill of 2011 was passed by both Houses of the Indian Parliament, Lok Sabha and the Rajya Sabha, on 12 December 2011 and assented by the president of India on 12 January 2012. The changes were published in the Official Gazette of India on 13 January 2012. As of 2023, there are a total of 98,500 active members of ICMAI.

== International affiliations ==
The ICMAI is a Founding Member of the International Federation of Accountants (IFAC), Confederation of Asian and Pacific Accountants (CAPA) and South Asian Federation of Accountants (SAFA) and Associate member of ASEAN Federation of Accountants. ICMAI is also a member of the National Foundation of Corporate Governance (NFCG).

== Qualification and syllabus ==
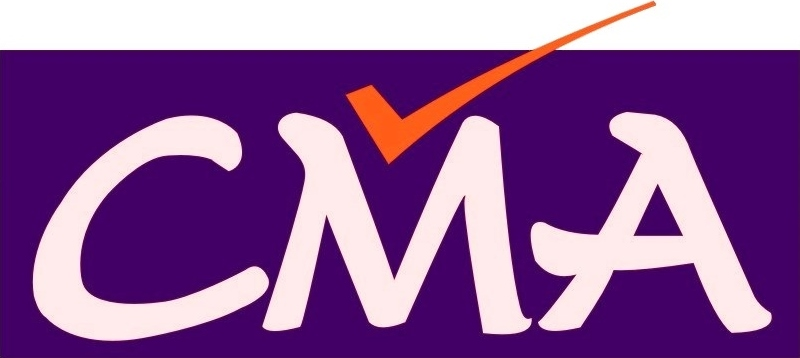
CMA Logo for exclusive use by Indian CMAs

This is the primary qualification of the ICMAI following completion of up to three levels (Foundation, Intermediate, and Final) examinations and three years of practical training in areas like Management Accounting, Cost Accounting, Financial Accounting, Taxation, Cost audits, GST audits, Internal audit, Corporate laws, etc. and enables an individual to become a CMA (Cost & Management Accountant).

- The institute has introduced new Syllabus 2022 which fulfills the requirements of the New Education Policy, 2020 and has increased the level of skill development and improved Course Learning objectives
- The old syllabus was introduced in August 2016 following the International Education Guidelines (IEG) of IFAC to get the advantages in the process of Mutual Recognition Agreement (MRA) among different member countries of the world under GATS in WTO.
- Subjects for examinations include Cost Accounting, Management Accounting, Corporate Law, Financial Accounting, Operations Management, Strategic Management, Taxation, Financial Management, Strategic Cost Management, Cost and Management Audit, Performance Management & Business valuation, etc.
- Students who have passed the degree examination of any recognized university or equivalent are eligible for admission directly to the Intermediate Level.
- Paper-wise exemptions on the basis of reciprocal arrangement are available to students who have passed Institute of Company Secretaries of India examinations.
- Examinations are held twice a year, in June and December, in various examination centers in India and overseas centers. The results are declared in August and February for the June term and December term exams respectively.

== Notable alumni ==
Name	Position	Organisation
Subhash Chandra Garg	Former Finance Secretary	Government of India
Chanda Kochhar	Former CEO	ICICI Bank
J Ramachandran	Professor	IIMB
Mrityunjay Athreya	Padma Bhushan, Management Advisor	
P. K. Mukherjee	Executive Director	Sesa Sterlite Limited
Kailasam Raghavendra Rao	Padma Shri, Entrepreneur	Orchid Chemicals & Pharmaceuticals Limited
B. B. Chakrabarti	Professor, Ex-Director	Indian Institute of Management Ranchi
B. B. Chakrabarti	Professor	Indian Institute of Management Calcutta; Indian Institute of Management Sirmaur
G. J. R. Krishnan	Musician	
T. V. Somanathan	Finance Secretary	Government of India
Sadanand Date (IPS)	Director General	National Investigation Agency
