= Mrityunjay Athreya =

Management advisor

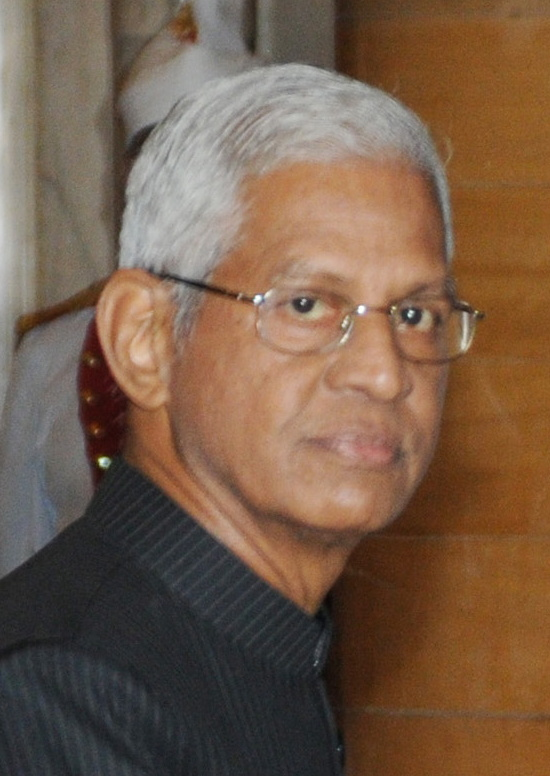
- Atreya in 2013
- Born: Tirunelveli, India
- Education: Institute of Cost Accountants of India, Loyola College, Chennai
- Occupations: Author, Educationist, Management adviser
- Awards: Padma Bhushan
- Website: Official web site of Sampradaan

Mrityunjay Athreya is an Indian author, educationist and management advisor, widely regarded as one of the founders and pioneers of Indian Management movement and education. A former professor at the Indian Institute of Management, Calcutta, the London Business School and the Strathclyde Business School, Scotland, and a known speaker at various international forums, he is the founder of Sampradaan Indian Centre for Philanthropy, a non-profit non governmental organization, serving as a platform for charity initiatives by high-net-worth individuals. The Government of India honored him, in 2014, by bestowing on him the third highest civilian award, the Padma Bhushan.

== Biography ==
The current global economic downturn takes me down memory lane. The first recession that I experienced and observed personally was in 1966-67 . Since then I have seen several, wrote Athreya, on the global recession of 2008, While there has been much pain in the various recessions, they have also helped to refine the Indian managerial competencies to the point where it can go for aggressive growth, and a global footprint.

Mritunjay Athreya was born in 1941, in Tirunelveli, Tamil Nadu to T.A. Balasundaram Iyer and Narayani Ammal. He was one of six sons and three daughters of his parents. They were of the Athreya Gotra, which would later be added to the name. His mother was of Bharadwaj Gotra from a clan that traced their lineage to Neelakanta Dikshitar. The young Mrityunjay was a bright student and graduated in Statistics from the Loyola College, University of Madras and followed it with the Cost Accountant qualification offered by the Institute of Cost Accountants of India (previously the Institute of Cost and Works Accountants of India) (ICWAI) with first rank and gold medal. He also qualified with the Chartered Institute of Management Accountants, UK. For further studies, he joined Stanford Business School, California, USA, on scholarship, spent one year there and, later, two years at the Harvard Business School to secure a PhD in Business Management before returning to India in 1967.

Pursuing his career as a management advisor, he currently lives in the Indian capital of New Delhi.

== Career ==
Indeed, the civil society has to create and sustain governance mechanisms to supervise the state and business, says Dr. Mrityunjay Atreya, and make them its servants, and not its masters.

Mrityunjay Athreya began his career as an executive in the Indian office of a multinational company which was short lived as he went over to the USA for his studies. On his return to India, he joined the Indian Institute of Management, Kolkata, in 1967, as the Assistant Professor and later, became the Professor. He also worked as visiting professor at London Business School and the Strathclyde Business School, Scotland.

Athreya's associations with various Government committees started with his involvement with the committee for restructuring Indian Airlines, in 1971, where he worked with Vijay Kelkar. This was followed by another committee, in 1972, for restructuring the State Enterprises of the Jammu and Kashmir.

In 1991, the Government of India invited Athreya to head the Telcom Restructuring Committee, which later came to be known as the Athreya Committee, heading a panel of eminent members such as Sam Pitroda; N. Vittal, IAS; V. Krishnamurthy and late M. R. Pai. The Committee made a set of proposals which are reported to have set India's communication revolution rolling.

Athreya has also been involved with many other committees, involved with the Reserve Bank of India, the Ministries of Coal and Civil Aviation and Nuclear power. He has also worked with C. Rangarajan, Montek Singh Ahluwalia, and Y. V. R. Reddy.

== Sampradaan Indian Centre for Philanthropy ==
Dr. Mrityunjay Athreya founded an NGO, Sampradaan Indian Centre for Philanthropy (SICP), a non-profit organization in 1996. The organization, registered as a society, has the objectives to promote philanthropy among Indian people, especially the high-net-worth individuals. It provides a platform for the philanthropists to channel their charity activities. The organization has a mandate to encourage research, documentation and dissemination of information, organize workshops and conferences and place itself as a premier resource centre.

== Awards and recognitions ==
- Padma Bhushan - 2014
- "Bhishma Pitamaha of Indian HR" by NHRDN and NDIM, New Delhi, 2021
- "Dharma Pracharak" by Sri Jagadguru Shankaracharya of Sringeri, 2021
- "Icon of the Year Award" by Institute of Cost Accountants of India, Kolkata, 2014
- Lifetime Achievement Award, Thinkers50 India, 2013

He has also been recognized with various fellowships.

- Ford Fellow, Harvard Business School, 1965-67
- Hoover Fellow, Stanford Business School, 1964-66
- Fellow, Institute of Cost and Works Accountants of India (ICAI)
- Fellow, Institute of Management Consultants of India (IMCI)
- Fellow, Human Resources Development Network (HRD Network)
- Fellow, Indian Society for Training and Development (ISTD)
- Fellow, All India Management Association (AIMA)
- Fellow, eInformation Systems, Security and Audit Association (EISA), 2005

== Works ==
- S. B. Budhiraja, M B Athreya (1 October 2002). Cases In Strategic Mgmt H/C. Tata McGraw-Hill Education. ISBN 9780074620977.
- Mrityunjay Athreya (October 1999). "In Defence of Civil Society". Rediff Business Special.
- Mrityunjay Athreya (January 2009). "Corporate Social Responsibility for Inclusive Growth". Indian Journal of Industrial Relations. 44 (3). Archived from the original on 8 August 2014 – via Questia.
- Mrityunjay Athreya (1998). "Indian Telecommunications Liberalisation:Halting but Inexorable". Home Magazine (India 1998).

== See also ==
- Indian Institute of Management Calcutta
