= Young India Skills University =

University in Hyderabad, India

- Type: Public
- Established: 2024; 2 years ago
- Affiliations: UGC
- Chancellor: Chief Minister of Telangana
- Vice-Chancellor: V.L.V.S.S. Subba Rao
- Location: Hyderabad, Telangana, India
- Campus: Urban
- Website: yisu.in

Young India Skills University was established in Hyderabad, India, under the public–private partnership model, to help generate employment opportunities and reducing the skill gap among youth.

== Establishment ==
Young India Skills University was established on 11 October 2024 and will start its operations on 4 November 2024. The university was set up to focus on generating the employment opportunities and improving the skill set of the individuals.

Anand Mahindra from Mahindra Group was appointed as first chairman of the university, for one year.

Adani Group donated a cheque of Rs 100 crores to the university.

Logistics company Redington Group invested around Rs 7 crore for the establishment of a logistics lab at a temporary campus.

== Memorandum of understanding ==
Young India Skill University had signed a memorandum of understanding with GMR Hyderabad International Airport Limited to build skill development programmes in the aviation sector.

== Courses ==
Young India Skills University launched with three schools: the School of Logistics and E-Commerce, the School of Healthcare, and the School of Pharmaceuticals and Life Sciences.

It started with six courses and currently has 17 specialised courses under below heads:

- Course for Warehouse Executive and Key Consignor Executive under Logistics and E-Commerce
- Course for Warehouse Finishing Skills in Nursing Excellence under Healthcare
- Course for the Warehouse the Pharma Associate Program under Pharmaceuticals and Life Sciences
- Courses in English and training on soft skills for final year graduate students

The university has additionally included four new courses in the field of logistics, medical, health, and pharmaceuticals.

Young India Skills University has tied up with EQUIPPP Social Impact Technologies Limited for skill development courses relating to Banking, Financial Services, and Insurance (BFSI).

== Logo ==
The university's logo shows 24 spokes surrounding an outline of India.

== See also ==
- Osmania University
