= B. B. Chakrabarti =

Indian academic

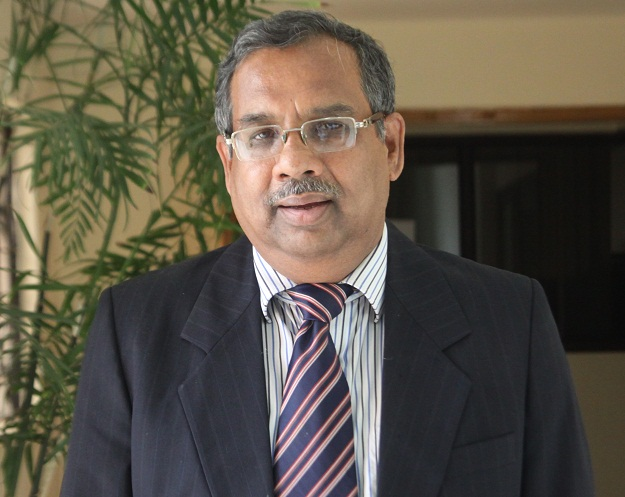
- Education: Institute of Cost Accountants of India, IIM Calcutta
- Scientific career
- Fields: Finance, management
- Workplaces: IIM Ranchi, IIM Calcutta

Binay Bhushan Chakrabarti, commonly known as B. B. Chakrabarti, is an Indian academic and professor of management and finance. He was the Director of Indian Institute of Management Ranchi (IIM Ranchi). His successor, Prof Shailendra Singh, was also an alumnus of IIM Lucknow.

Chakrabarti is a graduate of Jadavpur University and Indian Institute of Management Calcutta (IIM Calcutta). He is an Associate Member of the Institute of Cost and Works Accountants of India (ICWAI). He has taught finance at IIM Calcutta. He became the Director of IIM Ranchi in September 2013. He is a visiting faculty in the area of finance at IIM Calcutta, IIM Ranchi and IIM Sirmaur.
