= Gaudiya Nritya =

Bengali classical dance tradition

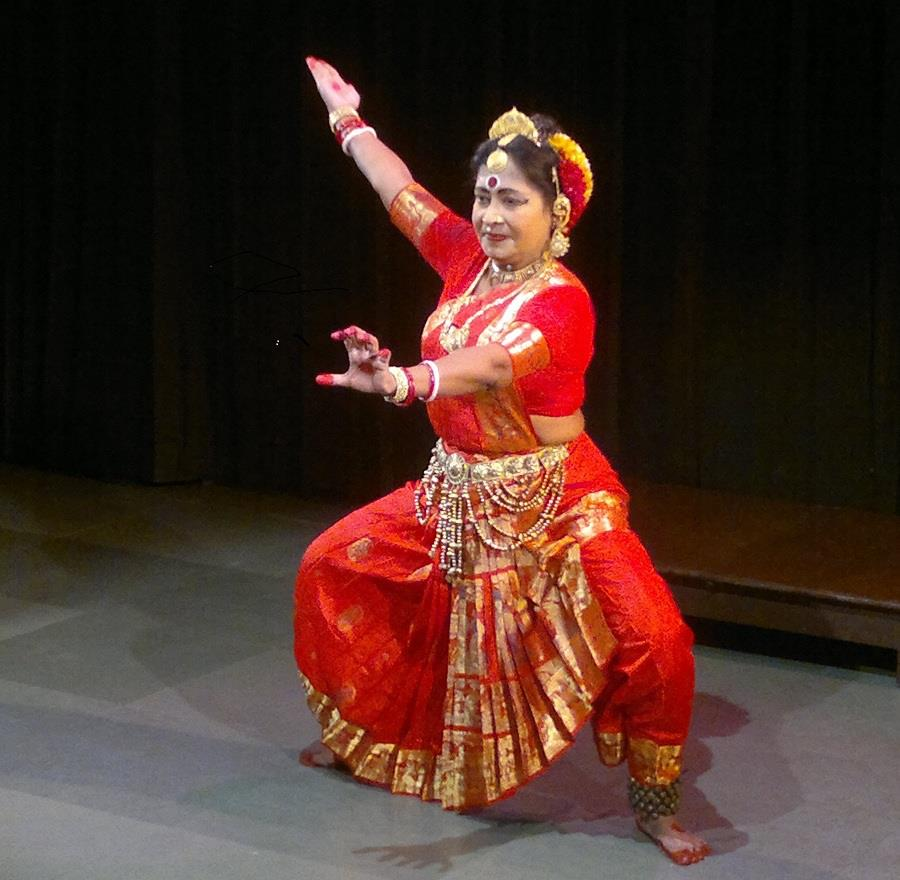
- Performance of Gaudiya Nritya by Mahua Mukherjee
- Genre: Indian classical dance
- Instrument(s): Ānaddha, Ghana, Suṣira and Tata
- Origin: Bengal

Gaudiya Nritya (Bengali: Gaur̤īẏa Nṛtya or Gour̤īyo Nrityo) is a classical dance form of Bengal. This dance expressed religious stories through songs written and composed to the ragas and talas of Gaudiya music by ancient poets, especially Vaishnavism. Gaudiya Nritya performances have also expressed ideas of other traditions related to the Hindu deities Shiva and Ganesha, as well as Shakta concepts. It was reconstructed by Mahua Mukherjee in the 1980s and a research scholarship has since been awarded for it by the Indian Ministry of Culture.

== Etymology ==
On 21 September 1994, The name Gaudiya Nritya was adopted on the advice of Indologist Bratindra Nath Mukhopadhyay. Reasons for this designation include: in ancient times – the reign of Shashanka and the Pala and Sena eras – the whole of Bengal was referred to as Gauda and the presence of the Gaudiya style in Indian music and literature. Also, in the seventeenth century, Sangeet Shastrakar Maheswara Mohapatra of Odisha mentions seven types of dance styles in his Sanskrit treatise Abhinaya Chandrika including Gaudiya dance.

== History ==
The theoretical foundations of Gaurika dance can be found in the ancient Sanskrit text Natyashastra; Its existence in ancient times is attested by dance poses in sculptures of the Gaudiya style temple and archaeological sites associated with Hinduism, Buddhism and Jainism and it is mentioned by ancient poets of Bengal. After India's independence from colonial rule, it underwent revival, reconstruction and expansion in the 1980s.

It has been reconstructed by Mahua Mukherjee, a Bengali researcher and dancer. A research scholarship was awarded by the Ministry of Culture for this dance-based research, which is mainly offered to recognize Indian classical dances. Rabindra Bharati University and University of Oklahoma have recognized it as a classical dance form.

== Music and instruments ==
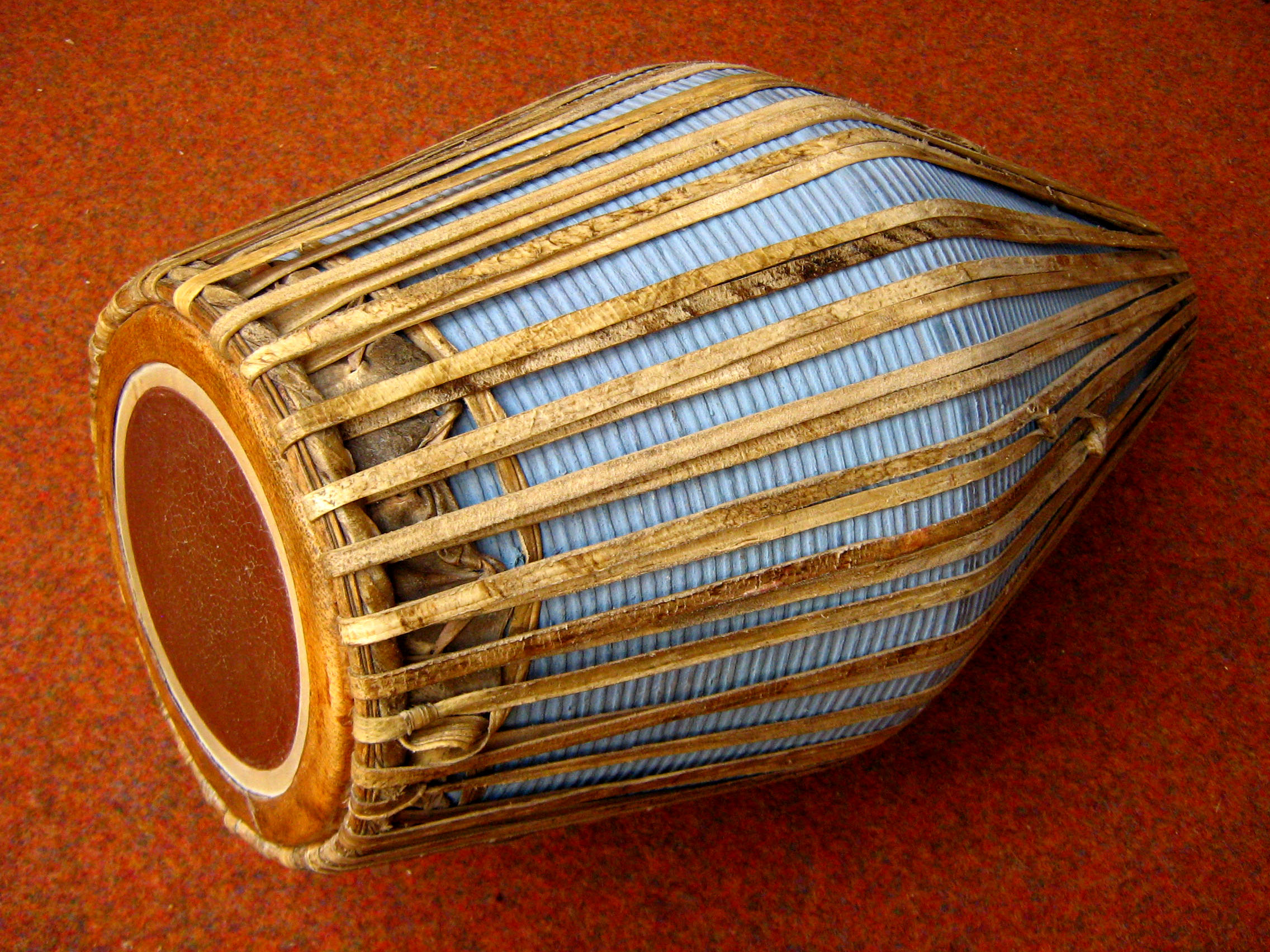
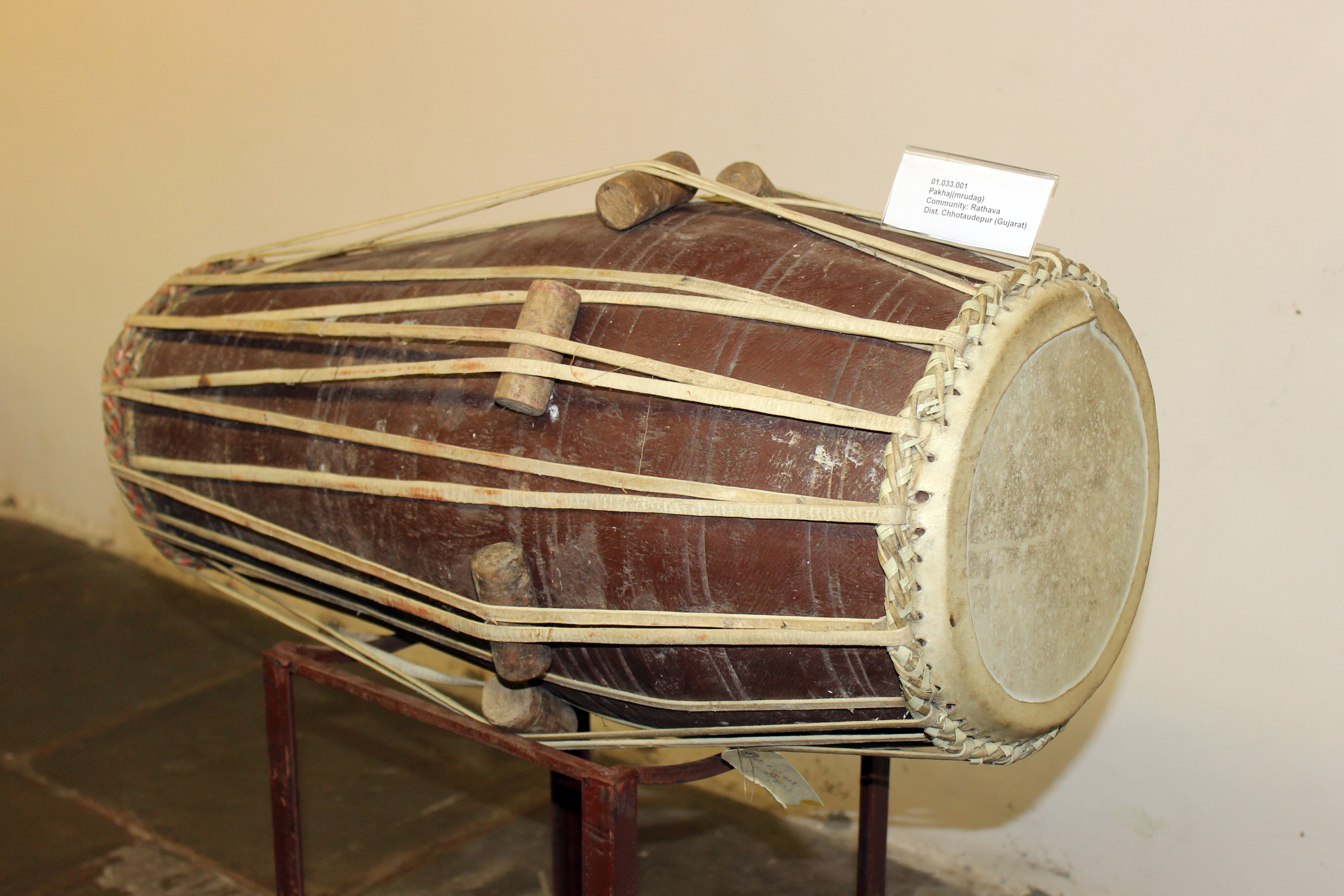
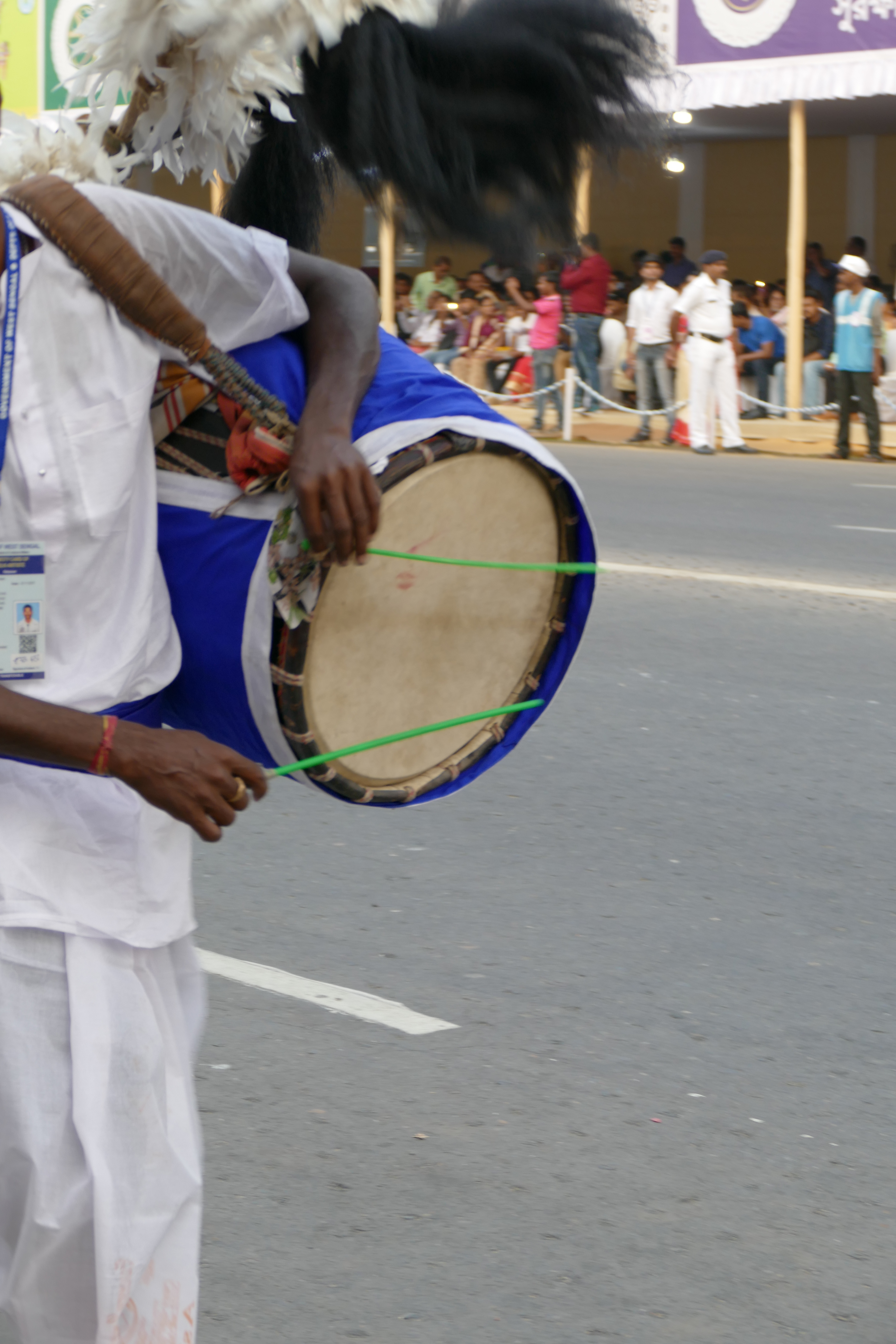
Three types of drums used in Gauḍīya Nṛtya: Shrikhol (left), Pakhavaj and Dhak (right)

Like other classical dances of India, the development of Gauḍīya Nṛtya is also based on religion and centered on deities. Therefore, naturally, its songs are also religious. Various types of Prabandha-gītis (essay songs), such as Kīrtana, Bhāvasaṅgīta, etc., are associated with Gauḍīya Nṛtya. The Prabandha-gīti has 6 angas to, and 5 jātis based on the number of angas. The angas are svara, viruda, pada, tenaka, pāṭa and tāla. Kīrtana is the mainstay of Gauḍīya Nṛtya. According to Svāmī Prajñānānanda, all six angas of the Prabandha-gīti are present in Kīrtana, and it is a Medinī type of Prabandha-gīti. Kīrtana song is a form of advanced Prabandha-gīti.

In Gauḍīya Nṛtya, tāla is measured by varṇakāla. This concept is referred to as akṣarakāla in Carnatic music and as mātrā in Hindustani music. Different tālas are formed through specific numerical combinations of varṇakālas; in Gauḍīya Nṛtya, there are various distinct tālas ranging from four varṇakālas up to sixty-eight varṇakālas. For example, four varṇakālas constitute Āditāla or Rāsatāla, whereas six or twelve varṇakālas constitute Lophā, whose other commonly known name is Japatāla. An eight-varṇakāla tāla features Cañcupuṭa or Kārphā, among others. In Gauḍīya Nṛtya, Āditāla or Rāsatāla is considered the foundation.

The main instruments in Gauḍīya Nṛtya are the Pakhavaj and the Shrikhol. In addition, other instruments are used at special times, in special roles, to create atmosphere and rasas.

== Bibliography ==
- Sengupta, Pallab; Banerjee, Manabendu; Mukherjee, Mahua, eds. (December 2005). Gaudiya Dance: A Coolection of Seminar Papers. 1 Park Street, Kolkata: The Asiatic Society.
- Mukherjee, Mahua (January 2000). Gaur̤īẏa Nṛtya গৌড়ীয় নৃত্য [Gaudiya Dance] (in Bengali). 1 Park Street, Kolkata: The Asiatic Society.
