= Sandeep Mukherjee =

American visual artist

- Born: 1964 (age 61–62); Pune, India
- Education: University of California Los Angeles, Otis College of Art and Design, University of California Berkeley Manipal Institute of Technology
- Known for: Painting, drawing, installation art, public art
- Awards: Guggenheim Fellowship, City of Los Angeles (COLA), California Community Foundation
- Website: sandeepmukherjeeart.com

Sandeep Mukherjee, Mutual Entanglements, acrylic on duralene, 7 ft × 50 ft (2.1 m × 15.2 m), 2015. Installation view, Chimento Contemporary, Los Angeles

Sandeep Mukherjee (born 1964) is an Indian-American artist based in Los Angeles who works in the areas of painting, drawing and installation art. His work engages with the discourses of process art, textile art, modernist abstract painting and traditional Eastern art, balancing emphases on materiality, the physicality of the performing body and viewer, architectural space, and image. He is most known for his process-oriented, improvisational abstract works—often paintings in acrylic inks and paints on textured or film-like surfaces—that seek to represent mutable, flowing matter and liminal realms between subjective experience and objective information. Mukherjee's early work was figurative; his later work, while abstract, is often likened to landscape and microscopic, natural or celestial phenomena. Los Angeles Times critic Christopher Knight described it as "ecstatic abstraction, built from color, line, movement and light. Like the dance done by a whirling dervish, who positions himself between material and cosmic worlds."

Mukherjee has received a Guggenheim Fellowship and awards from the City of Los Angeles and California Community Foundation, among others. He has exhibited internationally and his work belongs to public collections including those of the Museum of Modern Art (MoMA), Los Angeles County Museum of Art, Museum of Contemporary Art Los Angeles (MOCA), Kiran Nadar Museum of Art and Colección Jumex. He lives and works In Los Angeles and has been a Professor of Art at Pomona College in Claremont, California since 2006.

== Early life and career ==
Mukherjee was born in Pune, India, in 1964. He initially trained as an industrial engineer, earning degrees at Manipal Institute of Technology in Mangalore, India (BS, 1986) and University of California, Berkeley (MS, 1988). He worked for five years as an engineer at Texas Instruments in Tustin, California, while making art in his off-time. After taking art courses at a community college between 1991 and 1993, he enrolled at Otis College of Art and Design in Los Angeles, earning a BFA in 1996, and completed his studies at University of California, Los Angeles (MFA, 1999).

Mukherjee first received critical attention for solo exhibitions at Margo Leavin Gallery and the Pomona College Museum of Art, in Los Angeles, and group shows at California State University, MOCA Los Angeles ("Conversations," 2003), and the Hammer Museum. Since that time, he has had solo exhibitions in Bangladesh, Germany, India and the U.S., at Pitzer College, Sister and Chimento Contemporary (California), Brennan & Griffin (New York), Project 88 (Mumbai) and the Dhaka Art Summit, among others. He also appeared in group exhibitions at MoMA, BravinLee programs, and the MAK Center at the Schindler House.

== Work and reception ==
Since earning his MFA, Mukherjee has produced drawings and paintings on paper and Duralene—a translucent, vellum-like polymer film that simulates the slick luminosity of celluloid. This work has generally had both a sculptural presence, through surface manipulations (creases, folds, indents and pinpricks), and an architectural aspect, through multi-panel, mural-like works that traverse walls, turn corners and interact with the light of their spaces. Initially, these were minimal, finely drawn, embossed and incised drawings of nude figures floating in ethereal color fields, with erotic overtones that derived from both their subjects and skin-like surfaces. In the mid-2000s, he shifted to process-oriented abstractions applied and reworked with spontaneous, rhythmic gestures using brushes, concrete brooms, carved rolls, sponges and Q-tips; they evoke the physicality of the body and their own making while suggesting natural and geological phenomena, cosmological events and topographic maps. Author Claudia Rankine compared Mukherjee's "mode of erasure [that] peels back years of work … put aside, returned to and painted over" to the study of racial history, which creates depth of field by pulling forward texts and events "alive or dead to the imagination depending on where you are standing."

Sandeep Mukherjee, Untitled (One More Time), Detail 3, acrylic, color pencil and embossed drawing on duralene, 25 in × 300 in (64 cm × 762 cm) (entire work), 2002

Critics liken the organic intersecting and spiraling forms, complex surfaces and patterning, and deep saturated colors of Mukherjee's imagery to the work of experimental "direct" filmmakers (e.g., Oskar Fischinger, James Whitney and Len Lye) and his sculpting of light and phenomenological focus to the Southern California Light and Space movement. Writers also often attribute contemplative, spiritual or romantic dimensions to his work, due to its philosophical explorations of blurred boundaries between science and art, the subjective and objective, and space and time; he is often linked to the earlier "spiritual abstraction" of artists such as Lee Mullican, Jay DeFeo, Richard Pousette-Dart and Lee Bontecou.

=== Early figurative work (1999–2003) ===
Mukherjee's minimalist figurative work fused aspects of Asian art traditions with Western notions of subjectivity through shifting relations of figure and ground, light and space, and points of view. Art in America's Michael Duncan wrote that these drawings "suggest a fantastical, airy interior realm where rarified self-consciousness manifests as pure physicality." They consisted of multiple images of Mukherjee's own head and nude body meticulously rendered in pale colored-pencil contour lines, needle pricks and embossed or creased shapes, which floated through softly colored, monochrome fields incised with motifs of flowers, leaves, starbursts, and rippling water. The complex Duralene and paper surfaces—irregular planes of folds, creases and tattoo-like perforations—absorbed and reflected light, casting shadows that shifted as viewers changed position to create a visual push-pull between abstraction and figuration, painting and sculptural relief. Los Angeles Times critic David Pagel suggested the drawings "fuse the heightened perceptual acuity of classic Light and Space installations with the pleasures of classic figurative imagery, in a powerfully original fashion."

Mukherjee presented this work most notably in solo exhibitions at Margo Leavin Gallery in Los Angeles (2000, 2002) and the Pomona College Museum of Art (2004). The centerpiece of the 2002 show was a narrow, 110-foot (34 m) mural wrapping around four walls that featured self-portraits largely invisible at a distance, which were drawn, incised or creased on Duralene painted on the back with rich, flat pink, orange and yellow hues. Moving left to right, the piece progressed from delicate clusters of undulating heads to a large head and tumbling naked bodies growing to life-size on scored and folded fields of starbursts, stars and flowers, to wide-eyed, grinning heads. Critics suggest the work expresses a contemporary search for enlightenment and the self, with its indeterminate space evoking primal, prenatal memories or out-of-body experiences achieved through meditation, spiritual practice or sexual ecstasy; Christopher Knight called it "a gently epic narrative of sensual pleasure and extrasensory wonder."

=== Abstract work (2004– ) ===
Sandeep Mukherjee, Untitled (Panel 2), acrylic, acrylic ink and embossed drawing on duralene, 60 in × 102 in (150 cm × 260 cm), 2011.

In 2004, Mukherjee turned from figuration to complete abstraction, produced through varied, labor-intensive processes of brushing, dripping, daubing, dragging and erasing watery acrylic inks. He achieved a seemingly inexhaustible range of texture and pattern that suggested radiating mosaics, petrified stone, tree rings or mandalas, which he juxtaposed against largely white areas of linear rays and rippling forms sculpted in the Duralene surface. He presented this work in a solo exhibition at Sister in 2005, whose monumental centerpiece, Untitled (Centrifugal), was a five-panel, 8 ft × 25 ft (2.4 m × 7.6 m) work of monochrome jewel-toned, spiraled rings and fields of embossed, radiating lines that bent and buckled the surface into sharply etched mountains and valleys of shadow and light.

Between 2006 and 2010, Mukherjee continued to develop this work through several new cycles. His exhibitions at Sister and Cottage Home (2008) presented kaleidoscopic compositions of overlapping and intertwined spirals set against areas of black, creased Duralene. Critics likened them to lyrical, avant-garde film-still blow-ups, solar emanations and microscopic cells; LA Weekly critic Christopher Miles described their effect as "woozy, liberating and haunting." Mukherjee countered these hallucinatory works with minimalist works and series, such as Untitled (Black Valley) (2008)—which featured three glossy black embossed starburst forms flanked by two large matte-black shapes—and the dense but spare "landscapes" of his black-and-white "Thicket" series (2009–10).

Sandeep Mukherjee, Tree Skin, acrylic and acrylic ink on hand-molded aluminum panels, 4 panels 6 ft × 4 ft (1.8 m × 1.2 m) each, 2018. Installation view, The Kitchen & The Racial Imaginary Institute, New York.

The work in subsequent exhibitions at Project 88 (2011, 2014), Brennan & Griffin (2012) and Chimento Contemporary (2015) featured swirling, zigzagging and entwining sequences of ribbons that shifted between abstraction and suggestions of DNA strands and microscopic, botanic or cosmological forms. Their translucent green, brown, orange and yellow bands contained meticulously brushed striations dabbed in layered strokes and were set on black fields creased with webs of collapsing grids and protuberances (e.g., Splice, 2012; the "Tear" and "Palimpsest" series, 2014–5). The Chimento show featured Mutual Entanglements, an enveloping, 7 ft × 50 ft (2.1 m × 15.2 m), two-wall mural whose sprayed and dragged brown, green, purple and indigo colors and organic abstraction suggested a lush tropical jungle. The mural was unusual in that its construction and orientation was indeterminate and fluid, with panels that—per Mukherjee's gallery instructions—could be installed in any direction or order and yet retain cohesion, despite the lack of a repeating pattern.

In installations from 2016 to 2020, Mukherjee has extended the dimensionality of his work beyond relief to full sculpture. The 48-foot (15 m) wall-piece Elemental (2016) employed eight folded aluminum panels whose colors and painted forms call to mind molten lava or an evolving universe. In exhibitions at 68 Projects ("Molting the Fractured," Berlin, 2017) and The Kitchen ("On Whiteness," 2018) he presented hand-molded, human-sized aluminum works coated in acrylic that hung from the ceiling and reached the floor; the latter show's Tree Skin (2018) consisted of two pieces that reference oak tree trunks as a corporeal stand-in, evoking both callused and weathered flesh and the sites of lynching to address the violence perpetrated against non-white bodies.

== Recognition and collections ==
Mukherjee has received fellowships from the John Simon Guggenheim Memorial Foundation and Villa Aurora & Thomas Mann House e.V. (both in 2017), the City of Los Angeles Department of Cultural Affairs (COLA, 2015–6), and the California Community Foundation (2009). He has been awarded public art commissions for permanent installations in Los Angeles—at SoFi Stadium and the Facebook Headquarters in 2020—and in Toledo, Ohio, at the James M. Ashley and Thomas W.L. Ashley United States Courthouse, also in 2020.

Mukherjee's work belongs to the public collections of the Museum of Modern Art, Museum of Contemporary Art Los Angeles, Los Angeles County Museum of Art, Hammer Museum, Colección Jumex (Mexico City), Kiran Nadar Museum of Art (New Delhi), Nerman Museum of Contemporary Art, Orange County Museum of Art, Portland Art Museum, San Jose Museum of Art, and Weatherspoon Art Museum, in addition to several private, corporate and college collections.
