= Kailasam Raghavendra Rao =

Indian entrepreneur

- Born: 1958 (age 67–68); Chennai, Tamil Nadu, India
- Occupation: Entrepreneur
- Awards: Padma Shri

Kailasam Raghavendra Rao, is an Indian entrepreneur from Chennai and the founder of Orchid Chemicals & Pharmaceuticals Limited (currently Orchid Pharma Limited), a former top 500 Indian company on D and B listing, in terms of market capitalisation. The Government of India honoured Rao in 2011, with the fourth highest civilian award of Padma Shri.

== Bio ==
Raghavendra Rao was born in 1958 in Chennai, in the South Indian state of Tamil Nadu. His graduate studies were in Commerce which he completed in 1977 from Andhra University and continued his studies to obtain master's degree in management from the Indian Institute of Management, Ahmedabad in 1979.

Rao began his career in 1979 as the Financial Controller at Pure Ice Creams and later, moved to Ashok Leyland in 1981. A further move to Standard Medicals and Pharmaceuticals Limited, Hyderabad exposed him to the pharmaceutical industry. During these years, Rao obtained the cost accounting qualification of ICWAI of the Institute of Cost Accountants of India and Associateship Company Secretary (ACS). The next shift was to Muscat, Oman in 1982, where he worked for Al Buraim Group and returned to India in 1992 where he established his own venture, Orchid Chemicals & Pharmaceuticals Limited, a pharmaceutical company, which over the years, grew into one of the largest pharmaceutical companies in India.

Raghavendra Rao is a recipient of the India Young Business Achiever Award in 1997 and the Ernst and Young Entrepreneur of the Year Award in 1999. In 2011, the Government of India included Rao in the list of Republic Day honours for the award of Padma Shri. He is a Director at Orchid Laboratories Limited, Orchid Nutricare Limited, UK, BEXEL Pharmaceuticals Inc. and Al Buraimi Group.

== See also ==
- Orchid Pharma Limited
