= Mahua Mukherjee =

Indian choreographer

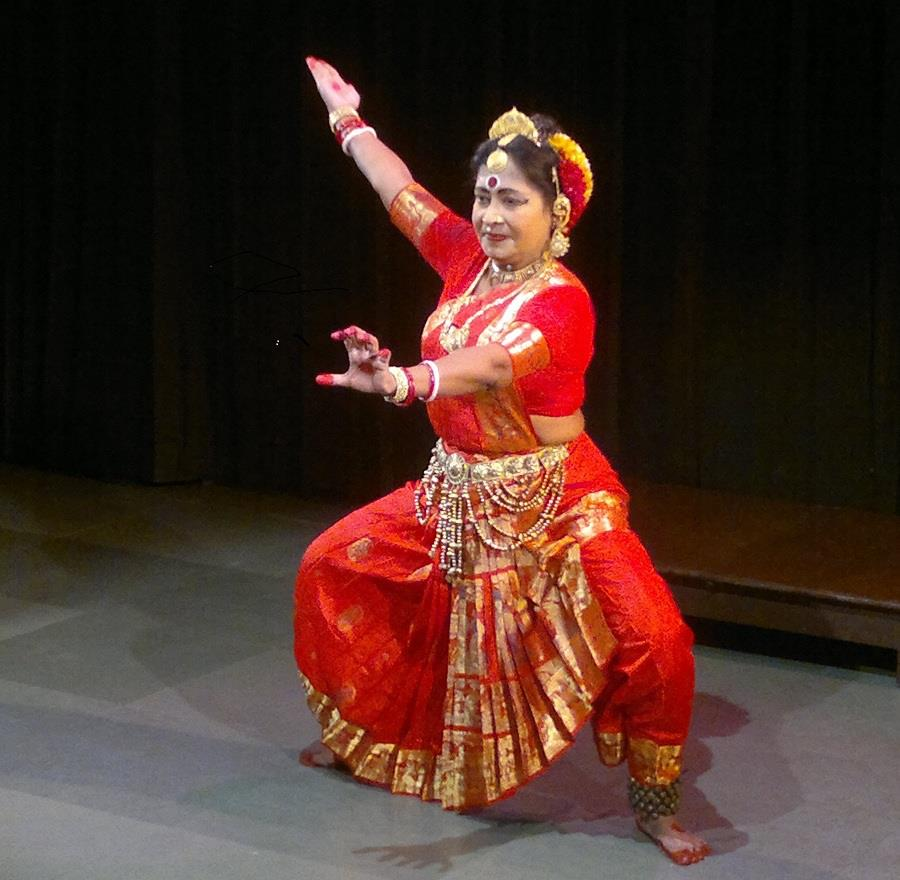
- Occupations: Dancer, researcher
- Career
- Dances: Gaudiya Nritya

Mahua Mukherjee^{[Note]} is an exponent of the Indian classical dance form Gaudiya Nritya. She is a researcher and teacher at Rabindra Bharati University and Dean of the faculty of fine arts as of January 2014. Along with her husband Amitava Mukherjee, she has been reviving the dance style through her career from 1980s. She has also given performances and lectures as visiting professor at the University of Oklahoma, USA. She has learned the dance from Bratindranath, Sashi Mahato, Narottam Sanyal, Gambhir Singh Mudha, Mukund Das Bhattacharya and other practitioners of the Chhau, Nachni, Kushan and Kirtaniya traditions.

Mukherjee is also the director of institutes Gaudiya Nritya Bharati and Mitrayan. She is M.Sc., Ph.D. in Botany. She had initially also taken training in Bharata Natyam. She is considered as the "fountainhead" of the dance. She has also been subject of a poem written by Nigerian writer Tanure Ojaide published in her collection "The Beauty I Have Seen: A Trilogy". She also features in the documentary film Geetmay Tanmay - Trance in Motion made by the Films Division of India.

== Books ==
She wrote a book on Bengal Classical Dance, Gaudiya Nritya. It was published from The Asiatic Society, Kolkata.

== Notes ==
^{^[Note]}Mukherjee is also credited as Mukhopadhyay. For further reading refer etymology of the surname.
