= P. K. Mukherjee =

Prasun K Mukherjee
- Born: 1 December 1955 (age 70); Calcutta, West Bengal, India
- Education: CA, ICWA
- Alma mater: Institute of Chartered Accountants of India; Calcutta University
- Occupation: Executive Director of Sesa Sterlite Limited
- Spouse: Subhra Mukherjee
- Children: Tathagatha (Son); Sarthak (Son)
- Website: www.sesagoa.com

Prasun Kumar Mukherjee (born 1 December 1955) is the Executive Director of Sesa Sterlite Limited, a subsidiary of Vedanta Resources plc.

== Education ==
Mukherjee completed his Bachelor of Commerce with Honours from Calcutta University. He is an Associate Member of the Institute of Cost Accountants of India, and a fellow of the Institute of Chartered Accountants of India.

== Career ==
Mukherjee has worked in various profiles including finance, accounts, costing, taxation, legal and management, at various organisations including CEAT Tyres and Bridge and Roof Company (India). He is presently the Managing director of Sesa Goa Limited, having taken up the position in 2006.

== Personal life ==
He is married to Subhra Mukherjee and they have two sons. The elder, Tathagatha is currently pursuing his MBA in China Europe International Business School and the younger, Sarthak is pursuing his CA. Mukherjee has a special interest in classical music and soccer. He is also the President of the Sesa Football Academy.

== Awards ==
Mukherjee was adjudged one of India’s Best Chief Financial Officers (CFOs) in the year 2005 by Business Today.

In November 2009, BusinessWorld declared him India’s most ‘Value’able CEO.

In July 2010, Star Ananda conferred on him the "Sera Bengali" award in the business arena.

== Associations ==
Mukherjee has been associated with various organisations in various capacities, including

- Former Co-chairman of the Mining Committee Federation of the Indian Chambers of Commerce and Industry(FICCI).
- Managing Committee Member & Member of Mentoring Committee of Goa Chamber of Commerce and Industry (GCCI).
- Chairperson of the Mineral Foundation of Goa.
- Executive Committee Member of the Goa Mineral Ore Exporters’ Association (GMOEA).
- Former President and Member of the Federation of Indian Mineral Industries (FIMI).
