= Mangalore Ranga Pai =

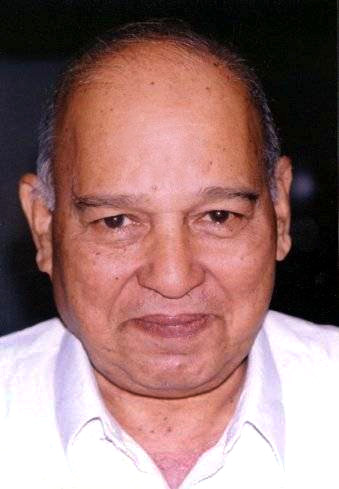
- Born: Manjeshwar, Kerala
- Occupations: Consumer Activist; Author

Mangalore Ranga Pai (7 May 1931 – 3 July 2003), or M. R. Pai, was an Indian journalist and business consultant. Pai was born in Manjeshwar, Kerala, a small village on the Karnataka-Kerala Border. He studied at Canara High School, Mangalore and later at Presidency College, Madras where he obtained an MA in political science at the top of his class and received the Candeth Gold Medal from Madras University.

== Degree in journalism ==
After his studies he went to Bombay, where he worked as an assistant editor with the Times of India. Two years later he went to the United States, where he obtained a master's degree in journalism from the University of California, Los Angeles. During his stay in the US, he had the opportunity of editing a newspaper at the Carlsbad Journal in a small town Carlsbad, California.

== Joins Forum of Free Enterprise ==
He returned to India and joined the New India Assurance Company Limited for a short while until it was nationalised, and then joined the Forum of Free Enterprise, which was launched on 18 July 1956 by the late A D Shroff. In 1957, along with Nani Palkhivala, the forum was developed into a national organisation which organised meetings on economic subjects across the country.

Through the forum he was responsible in corresponding with members of the Parliament of India, and other opinion leaders.

He left the forum in 1976 to become a business consultant. However, he continued to be its vice president till his death. In 2004, the All India Bank Depositors' Association, which he founded and headed, started the M. R. Pai Award.

== Meeting with Milton Friedman ==
When Milton Friedman visited India in 1963, Pai was responsible for his meetings in India. The friendship generated during this visit lasted till Pai's death. When the Friedmans published their book Free to Choose in 1982, an autographed copy was sent to Pai, with an offer to publish any portion as a booklet. The Forum obliged them by bringing a booklet Central Economic Planning in September 1982.

A few years later in 1998 in their autobiography Two Lucky People, the Friedmans made a mention of Pai.

He was the secretary of the forum till 1976, and its vice president till his death.

== Consumer activist ==
During the years of the controlled economy India, when almost all services where provided by a Government owned monopoly, the services that could be availed by a consumer was either appalling or even non existent.

It was during this time when the term consumer rights was yet to gain popularity, that Pai was able to make a big impact. Services offered by the Indian Telephones, Indian nationalised banks and Indian Airlines among others began to face his ire. He started demanding good services for the customer at every available forum.

He was an honorary secretary of the All-India Bank Depositors' Association, through which he published the book Depositors’ Rights and Customer Service in Banks which provided the customer of a bank with information required to deal with the various problems faced by them.

The Indian edition of Reader's Digest, featured him on the cover of their October 1995 issue under the title M. R. Pai - Champion of the Consumer.

== Books ==
He has written about five books

- An Indian Economic Miracle and Other Essays (1970)
- How to Arrange Programmes and Meetings
- How to Save and Invest
- Time Management
- The Legend of Nani Palkhivala (2002)
