= The Journal of Entrepreneurship =

- Discipline: Entrepreneurship
- Language: English
- Edited by: Sunil Shukla

Publication details
- History: 1992
- Publisher: Sage Publications India Pvt Ltd
- Frequency: Bi-annual
- Impact factor: 2.1

Standard abbreviations
- ISO 4: J. Entrep.

Indexing
- ISSN: 0971-3557 (print); 0973-0745 (web)

Links
- Journal homepage; Online access; Online archive

The Journal of Entrepreneurship is a forum for discussion of issues that bear upon and enfold the field of entrepreneurship. The journal advances the understanding of entrepreneurship phenomenon across different national and cultural contexts.

It is published twice a year by Sage Publications India Pvt Ltd in association with Entrepreneurship Development Institute of India. It is managed by editor-in-chief Sunil Shukla.

This journal is a member of the Committee on Publication Ethics (COPE).

== Abstracting and indexing ==
The Journal of Entrepreneurship is abstracted and indexed in:

- CABELLS Journalytics
- Chartered Association of Business Schools (CABS)
- Clarivate Analytics: Emerging Sources Citation Index (ESCI)
- Dutch-KB
- Indian Citation Index (ICI)
- UGC-CARE (GROUP II)
- ProQuest: International Bibliography of the Social Sciences (IBSS)
- EconLit
- SCOPUS
- DeepDyve
- Portico
- EBSCO
- OCLC
- Ohio
- Australian Business Deans Council
- J-Gate
