= Orchid Pharma =

Indian pharmaceutical company

- Formerly: Orchid Chemicals & Pharmaceuticals
- Company type: Public
- Industry: Pharmaceuticals
- Founded: July 1, 1992; 34 years ago
- Founder: Kailasam Raghavendra Rao
- Key People: Manish Dhanuka (Managing Director); Ram Gopal Agarwal (Chairman)
- Parent: Dhanuka Laboratories

Orchid Pharma Limited (formerly known as Orchid Chemicals & Pharmaceuticals Limited) is an Indian pharmaceutical company based in Chennai. It was founded by Kailasam Raghavendra Rao on 1 July 1992. Orchid Pharma is the only pharma company in India to have discovered a New Drug (NCE) Enmetazobactam which is now approved in United States, Europe and India.

== History ==
Established in 1992 as an export-oriented unit, Orchid transitioned into a large-scale pharmaceutical manufacturer over the following decades. During the 1990s and early 2000s, the company became a primary Indian producer of oral and sterile cephalosporins and obtained various international industry certifications, such as ISO, GMP, and GLP.

Orchid's growth strategy included entering the US, European, and Chinese markets. This period was marked by research collaborations with companies such as Merck and the acquisition of the US-based firm Bexel Biotechnology. By the mid-2000s, the company had expanded its operations into chronic therapy and drug discovery. During this time, its manufacturing facilities were also visited by then-President Dr. A.P.J. Abdul Kalam.

The late 2000s and early 2010s marked a period of high-value business transfers and strategic shifts, highlighted by a $400 million sale of its generic injectables business to Hospira in 2010. However, following a series of financial challenges and a Corporate Debt Restructuring (CDR) package in 2014, the company entered the Corporate Insolvency Resolution Process (CIRP) in 2017. This transitional period culminated in March 2020, when Dhanuka Laboratories Limited successfully implemented a resolution plan approved by the Supreme Court of India.

== Insolvency Resolution ==
In August 2017, Orchid Pharma was identified by the Reserve Bank of India as one of 28 large corporate defaulters and was subsequently referred for the Corporate Insolvency Resolution Process (CIRP) under the Insolvency and Bankruptcy Code (IBC). Following an initial failed bid by Ingen Capital, a second round of bidding led the Committee of Creditors (CoC) to approve a resolution plan from Dhanuka Laboratories for ₹1,116 crore. Although the National Company Law Appellate Tribunal (NCLAT) initially rejected the bid because it was lower than the company's liquidation value of ₹1,309 crore, the Supreme Court of India overturned this decision in 2020. The Court ruled that the IBC does not require a resolution bid to match or exceed the liquidation value, affirming the "commercial wisdom" of the creditors in accepting the settlement.

== Areas of focus ==
Orchid Pharma Ltd. operates as a vertically integrated pharmaceutical entity with operations spanning drug discovery, research, manufacturing, and global marketing. The company maintains a multi-therapeutic presence, producing treatments for the central nervous system (CNS) and cardiovascular segments (CVS), as well as anti-infectives, anti-inflammatories, and nutraceuticals. Its product range includes both active pharmaceutical ingredients (API) and finished dosage forms in oral and sterile varieties. By utilising an integrated business model, the firm manages the entire value chain from initial research to delivery, utilising a specialised product portfolio to compete within its active markets. The company further extends its reach through strategic alliances with approximately 50 global pharmaceutical organisations, focusing its future growth on the global generics and API sectors.
