= Mohua Mukherjee =

Indian activist

Mohua Mukherjee (born August 1952) is a social activist and an author from Kolkata, West Bengal. Her achievements include social activism, writing, documentary and short film making, artistry, theatre work and socio-economic research about tribes of India. She is the founder of the non-governmental organization Sanyog Audio Visual and Welfare Society.

== Early and personal life ==
She was schooled at Gokhale Memorial School, Kolkata. She married Alok Mukherjee in 1974.

== Career ==
After marriage she took a freelance job at Hotel Oberoi Grand–Kolkata as an interior decorator. She joined St. Thomas Kidderpore as an art teacher. She started an art school at home for children, named ‘Rekhae Chonde’. She combined the art school with Indian classical dancing, the combination called "Rekahe" (for painting) and "Chonde" (for dancing). She also created a ‘Dance Drama Group" in Kolkata named "Roopkatha"..

She started social work through projects in conjunction with UNICEF, United Nations Educational, Scientific and Cultural Organization, WILD, AIIPH, World Health Organization and India-Canada Environment Facility (ICEF) through her own NGO named Sanyog Audio Visual and Welfare Society, which focuses on issues such as homelessness and health. in urban and rural areas of West Bengal. She developed an interest on tribal life and joined the movement for the welfare of tribes in rural Bengal and adjacent areas.

She also began working in journalism and has been published in newspapers and magazines such as Ulto Rath, Shanonda, AnandaBazar Patrika, Bartaman and AajKaal.

Books written by Mukherjee include Lal Maati Shaal Bon, Gohin Manush He, Chandoi Birhor and Birhor towards next Millennium.

== Publications ==
=== Books ===
- Mohua Mukherjee (2008), Bhumi Kanya, Kolkata: Sahojatri Publications, OL 24334773M
- Mohua Mukherjee (1993), Gahin Manush He, Kolkata: Mohua Prakashani, OL 1251828M
- Mohua Mukherjee (1997), Laal Maati Shaal Bon, Kolkata: Sujan Paublications, ISBN 81-85549-15-X, OL 506618M, 818554915X
- Mohua Mukherjee (2000), The Birhor towards the next millennium (The Birhor towards the next millennium ed.), Kolkata: Sujan Publications, OL 170587M
- Mohua Mukherjee (2003), Chandoi Birhor aar Projaati Manushder Kotha, Kolkata: Sujan Publications, ISBN 81-85549-30-3, OL 3711400M, 8185549303
