= Redington Group =

Technology company group

- Industry: Mobile Handsets; Mobile Accessories; Information Technology; Supply Chain Management
- Predecessor: G. Kewalram Private Limited; Kewalram Private Limited
- Founded: May 2, 1961; 65 years ago
- Founder: R. Srinivasan
- Key people: J. Ramachandran (Chairman: 2006- )
- Website: www.redingtongroup.com

Redington or Redington Group is an organization of companies offering services and products in the field of mobile handsets, mobile accessories, information technology services, artificial intelligence, big data analysis, 5G communications, Internet of Things and supply chain management. The group operates through its three subsidiary companies viz. Redington India, Redington Gulf and Redington Singapore (Redington Distribution).

== History ==
=== Redington India ===
The organization officially started its operation in the year 1993 as R. Srinivasan co-founded Redington in the same year, whereas it was incorporated back in the year 1961 with its primary focus on functioning as the distributor of IT products. With the group's commencement of operation from 1993, the organization gradually started to operate in Middle East and Africa & other South Asian countries. The area of operation was expanded of logistic supply chain management system and broader IT and Telecom Products. Initially the company started to act as the distributor of IT products from Epson, Tripp Lite, Samsung etc. in India. In 1995, the company started to distribute Compaq and Philips products in India. Gradually in subsequent years Redington India started to distribute hardware and software products from Intel and Microsoft. It entered into a tie-up with IBM App Connect Enterprise and Canon in the year 1998. From 2002, the company started its operation in Call Centre segment. In 2007, Redington India started to distribute the Apple products. In 2008 Redington India became the distributor of Adobe products.

In 2008, Investcorp bought 26% stake of Redington International which they later sold in 2012 Redington India via its Gulf Opportunity Fund. In 2019, Redington has acquired 90% stake in Auroma Logistics. In September 2021, Arena Bilgisayar, the Turkish arm and subsidiary of Redington India acquired Brightstar Telekomünikasyon at $35 million.

In August 2023, Rajiv Srivastava resigned as the Managing Director of Redington citing personal reasons.

=== Redington Gulf ===
Redington Gulf FZE started its operation in 1999 as a subsidiary of Redington Mauritius Limited. In April 2004, the Redington group acquired the Redington Gulf FZE from Redington Mauritius. During this time, the Redington group also invested significantly in Redington Distribution Pte Ltd and Cadensworth. In 2006, the Redington group acquired 100% stake in both Redington Distribution Pte Ltd and Cadensworth.

Redington Gulf operates across Middle East, Africa, CIS region and, Turkey (via Arena Bilgisayar). Its core services remain around value and telecom distribution, distribution services, logistic services and support services. Redington Value is the "value-added distribution" division of Redington Gulf which is based in Dubai. In October 2015, Redington Value forged partnership with CyberArk through which Redington Value became enabled to distribute CyberArk's Privileged Account Security Platform throughout the middle east region. In November 2015, Redington group through Redington Gulf acquires 70% share of Linkplus. In September 2020, Redington Value signed partnership with CrowdStrike to distribute its falcon endpoint protection suite in the MENA region. In the same month Redington Value also entered into a tie-up with Gigamon.

== Further reads ==
- Srinivasan. R., The New Indian Industry: Structure and Key Players. India, Macmillan India, 2005.
