= Joseph P. Kinneary United States Courthouse =

Federal courthouse in Columbus, Ohio

- United States Post Office and Courthouse
- U.S. National Register of Historic Places
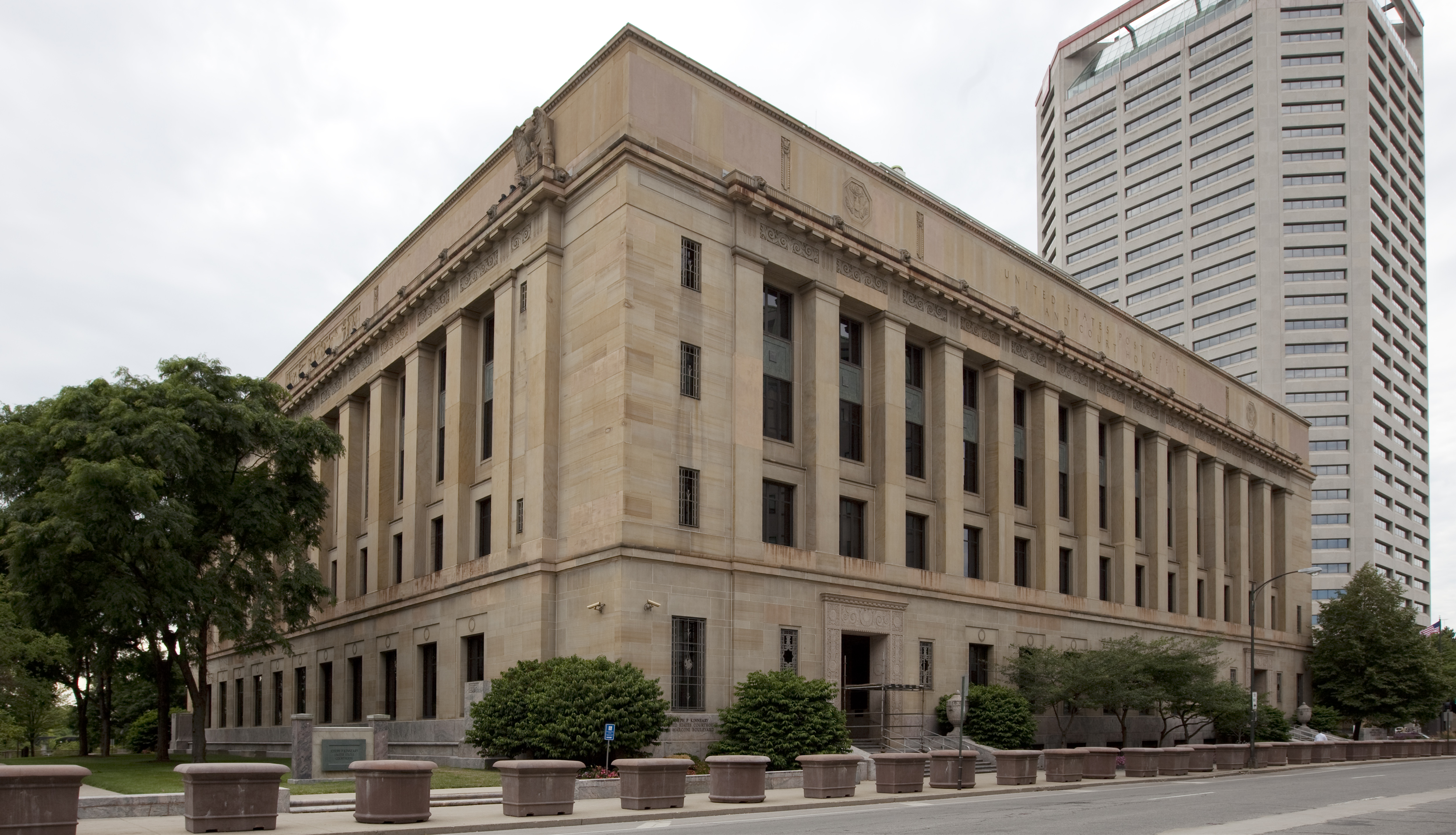
- Interactive map highlighting the building's location
- Location: 85 Marconi Boulevard, Columbus, Ohio
- Coordinates: 39°57′50″N 83°00′19″W
- Architect: Richards, McCarty & Bulford
- Architectural style: Neoclassical
- Restored: 2012-2014
- NRHP reference No.: 12000330
- Added to NRHP: June 6, 2012

The Joseph P. Kinneary United States Courthouse is a federal courthouse in Columbus, Ohio, in the city's downtown Civic Center. It was formerly known as the U.S. Post Office and Court House. It was designed by Richards, McCarty & Bulford and was completed in 1934. The supervising architect was James A. Wetmore. It was renamed for Joseph P. Kinneary in 1998. It is still in use by the U.S. District Court for the Southern District of Ohio.

== History ==
The building was constructed as a post office and courthouse in 1934. Renovations completed in July 2014 improved the interiors and exterior, and reduced water and electric usage. Installations included high-efficiency water boilers, air-handling units, a building automation system, a rainwater harvesting tank, light fixtures, occupancy and daylight harvesting sensors, and low-flow water fixtures. On the exterior, portions of the building's sandstone facade and chimney were repaired or replaced. Its windows were reglazed, and its penthouses were re-paneled.

== Attributes and design ==
The courthouse is located along the Scioto River by Battelle Riverfront Park (part of the Scioto Mile). It is named after Joseph Peter Kinneary, a former judge.

The building is mainly used by the U.S. District Court, Southern District of Ohio and the Sixth Circuit Court of Appeals. Other offices are used by the U.S. Marshals, attorneys, probation, and pretrial services.

The building is designed in the Neoclassical style. Its design includes cornices and a large colonnade spanning its northern facade. Its exterior is mainly composed of granite wainscot and Berea sandstone cladding, while the windows have Vermont marble panels and iron grill encasements.

== Gallery ==
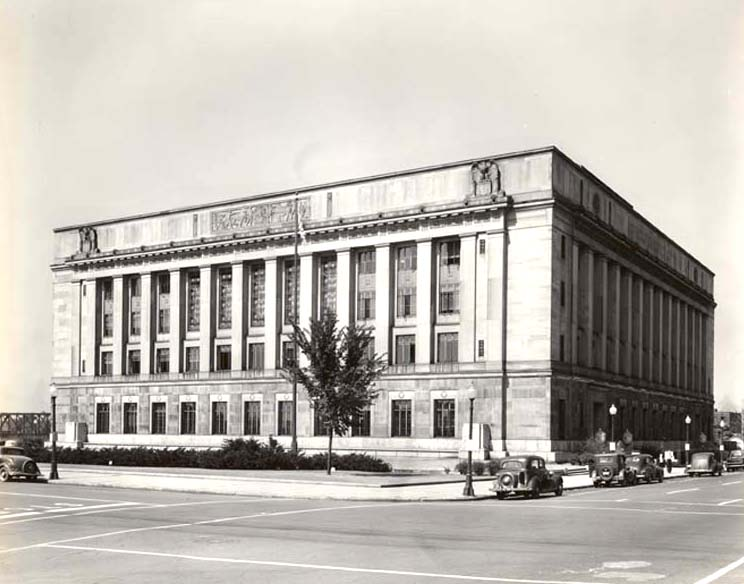
The courthouse in 1940

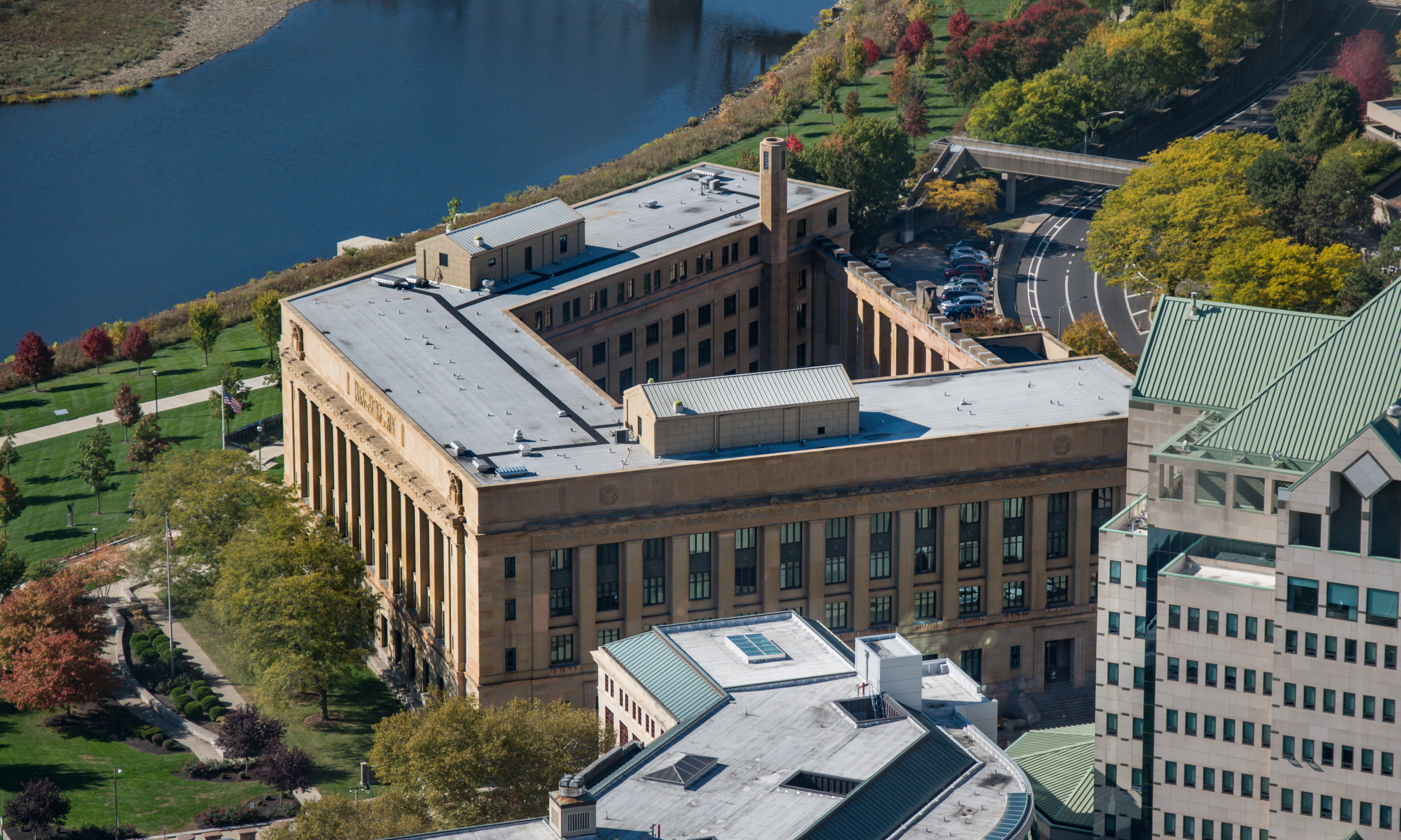
Aerial view

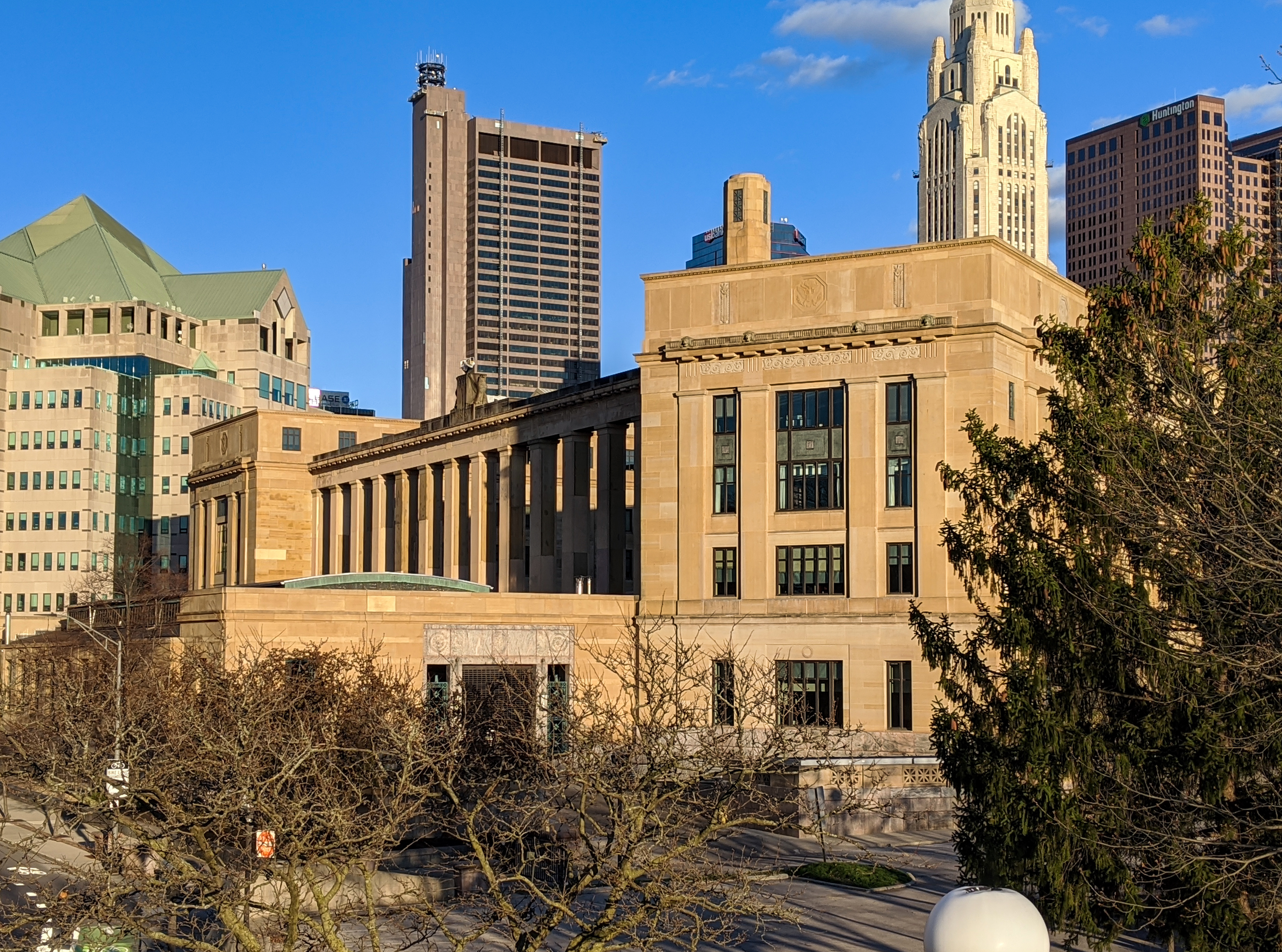
North facade

Main lobby

Courtroom

Courtroom

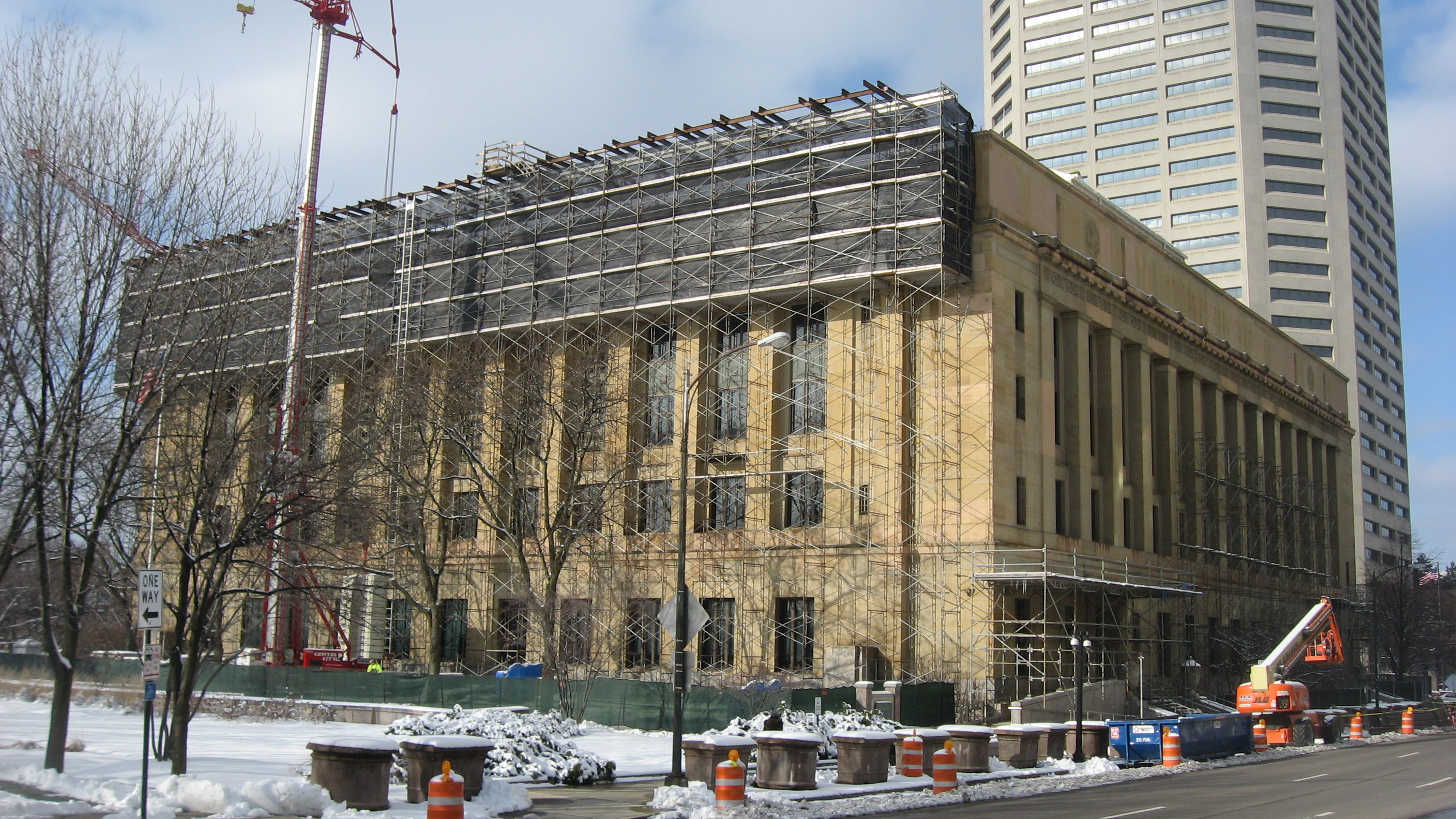
Restorative work in 2012

== See also ==
- List of United States federal courthouses in Ohio
- National Register of Historic Places listings in Columbus, Ohio
