= James M. Ashley and Thomas W.L. Ashley United States Courthouse =

Coordinates: 41.6575°N 83.5361°W

- United States Courthouse and Custom House
- U.S. National Register of Historic Places
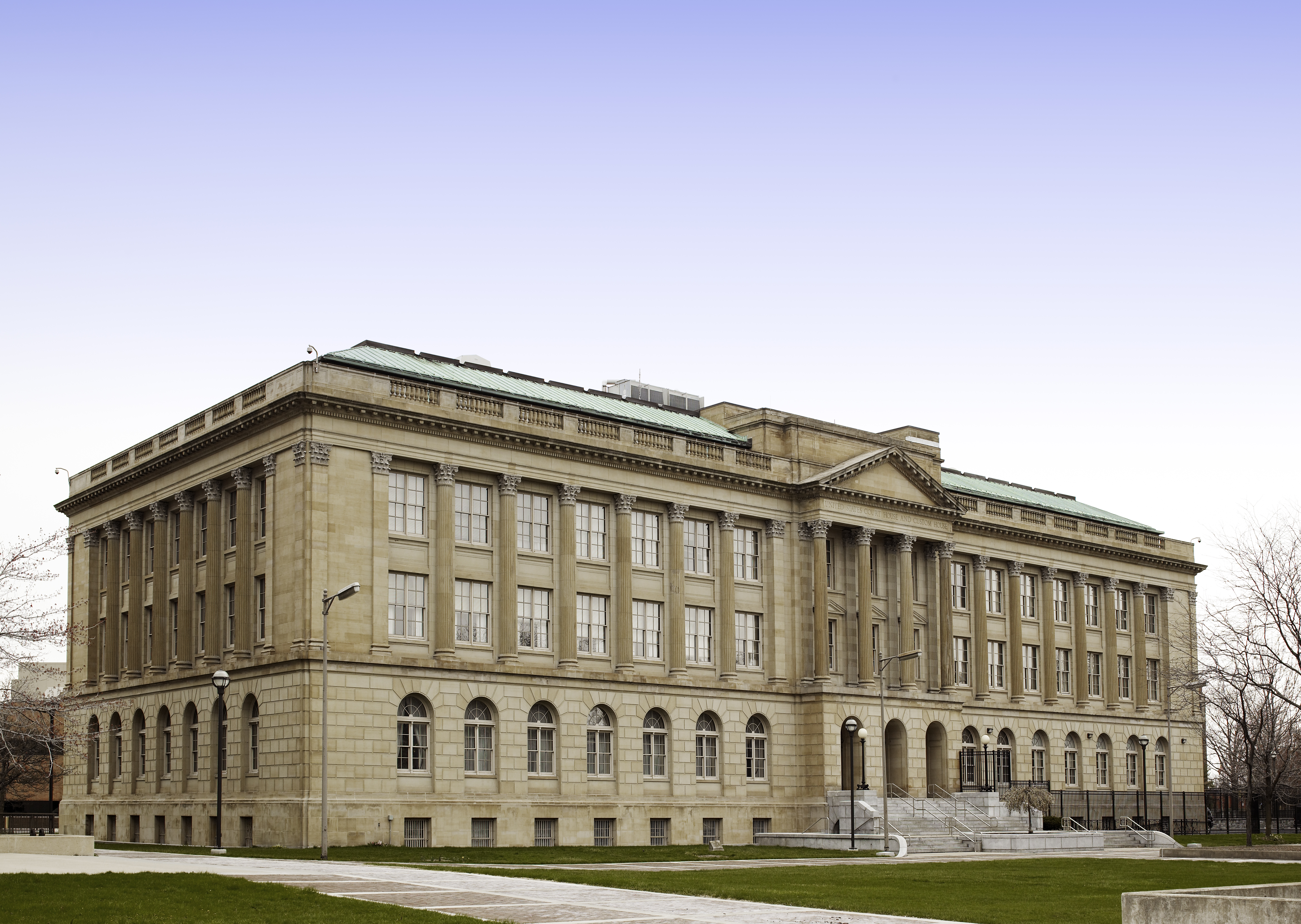

- Location within Ohio Location within the United States
- Location: 1716 Spielbusch Avenue, Toledo, Ohio
- Built: 1932
- Architect: James A. Wetmore
- Architectural style: Neoclassical Revival
- NRHP reference No.: 13000501
- Added to NRHP: July 17, 2013

The James M. Ashley and Thomas W.L. Ashley United States Courthouse, formerly the United States Courthouse, Toledo, Ohio, is a courthouse of the United States District Court for the Northern District of Ohio built in Toledo, Ohio, in 1932. It is named for two former Congressmen, Republican James M. Ashley, and his great grandson, Democrat Thomas W. L. Ashley.

== Building history ==
As early as 1909, Toledo's leaders explored the idea of developing a civic center within the city. Intrigued with the philosophy of the City Beautiful movement, officials determined that Beaux Arts planning principles suited their vision for a monumental government center. Toledo's 1924 master plan formalized the concept. By 1925, the city purchased the quadrangle bounded by Jackson, Erie, and Orange streets and Spielbusch Avenue. The civic center's first structure was constructed in 1926.

In 1929, architect Graham H. Woolfall presented Acting Supervising Architect of the U.S. Treasury James A. Wetmore's design for the spacious four-story United States Courthouse and Custom House to be located within the civic center. The new federal building would replace the overcrowded 1888 federal building located at Madison Avenue and St. Clair streets. Constructed between 1930 and 1932, the new building was celebrated as "a monument of efficiency" for combining all federal offices in Toledo under one roof. The building is a notable example of Neoclassical architecture in Toledo and was constructed during the ambitious public works program developed in response to the Great Depression. In the early 1940s, Toledo's civic center was extensively landscaped to include an expanse of open space, trees, and a glass-block fountain.

In 1962, several agencies relocated from the 1932 building to the newly constructed federal building on Summit Street. As a result, the building underwent renovations to accommodate the remaining departments, including installation of a central air-conditioning system. In the 1970s, the building underwent further renovations for the U.S. Bankruptcy Court. The customs service and FBI vacated the building in 1981.

In the 1990s, exterior window repair and replacement occurred as well as additional interior renovations for the District Courts and offices. The United States Courthouse is listed on the National Register of Historic Places.

== Architecture ==
The courthouse is a distinguished example of the Neoclassical architectural style that dominated public building design throughout the early twentieth century. The style incorporated elements of the Georgian, Federal, Early Classical Revival, and Greek Revival traditions. It is located at the northwest end of Toledo's extensively landscaped civic center. The exterior has remained largely intact since the building's completion in 1932. The rectangular, four-story building rests on a sandstone basement and contains two light courts that admit natural light into the structure. The first-story exterior is faced with rusticated, buff-colored limestone panels, and sandstone covers the exterior of the second and third stories. A standing-seam copper, hipped roof caps the building.

Exterior column detail.

On the west and east elevations, wide granite steps lead to projecting, three-bay, centrally located entrance pavilions topped with pediments. "United States Court House and Custom House" is carved into the frieze. The first story contains arched openings on each elevation. The doors and frames of the building are bronze and decorated with dentils and a flower motif. Engaged, fluted, Corinthian columns span the second and third floors of each elevation, and paired, Corinthian pilasters are located at each corner. A dentil course decorates the projecting cornice and pediments of the building. A granite balustrade lies within the parapet topped with coping, which conceals the fourth story.

Although the courthouse has accommodated various functions since its construction, it has remained in continuous use. These functional changes resulted in major renovations of the interior, most notably to office areas. Overall, the spaces retaining significant historic features and finishes are lobbies, corridors, and two courtrooms on the second floor.

The principal lobbies and corridors retain white and gray speckled terrazzo flooring inlaid with a marble border. The walls are clad with floor-to-ceiling, flat marble panels. The corridor retains its original plaster ceiling featuring recessed panels trimmed with gold-painted floral leaf moldings and pendant light fixtures. The two first-floor lobbies and corridor feature free-standing, octagonal-shaped, marble columns with decorative plaster capitals.

Elevator detail.

The east lobby includes the two elevators and main stairway for the building. The elevators are set into a marble surround and feature paneled bronze doors decorated with flower medallions. Each elevator surround includes a glazed, bronze-colored, plaster transom, inlaid with a floral motif. The partially enclosed, original stairway is located on the south end of the lobby opposite the two elevators. The stairway is made of marble treads, decorative bronze railing, and a simple wood handrail.

The second floor consists of a centrally located, two-story courtroom and a one-story courtroom located on the south end, each accessed by leather-clad, wood doors. The two-story courtroom was extensively renovated in 1998. The walls consist of gypsum board and plaster. Fluted pilasters divide the upper portion of the walls. New elevated benches and witness stands were also added in 1998. The smaller, one-story courtroom contains plaster walls with wood wainscoting and bronze grilles, and a decorative plaster ceiling. The ceiling consists of recessed panels and cross beams featuring decorative medallions. The furniture in the smaller courtroom was relocated from a federal building in Youngstown, Ohio.

== Significant events ==
- 1926 First civic center building constructed
- 1929 U.S. Courthouse and Custom House designed
- 1930-1932 Building constructed
- 1963-1964 U.S. Courthouse renovated
- 1980 Building determined eligible for listing in the National Register of Historic Places

== Building facts ==
- Location: 1716 Spielbusch Avenue
- Architect: James A. Wetmore
- Construction Dates: 1930-1932
- Architectural Style: Neoclassical
- Landmark Status: Eligible for listing in the National Register of Historic Places
