= Robert Nevin =

Robert Nevin may refer to:

- Robert M. Nevin (1850–1912), American lawyer and politician
- Robert Reasoner Nevin (1875–1952), United States federal judge
- Bob Nevin (born 1938), American ice hockey player
