= Château de Baronville =

- near Béville-le-Comte, Eure-et-Loir, Centre-Val de Loire, France
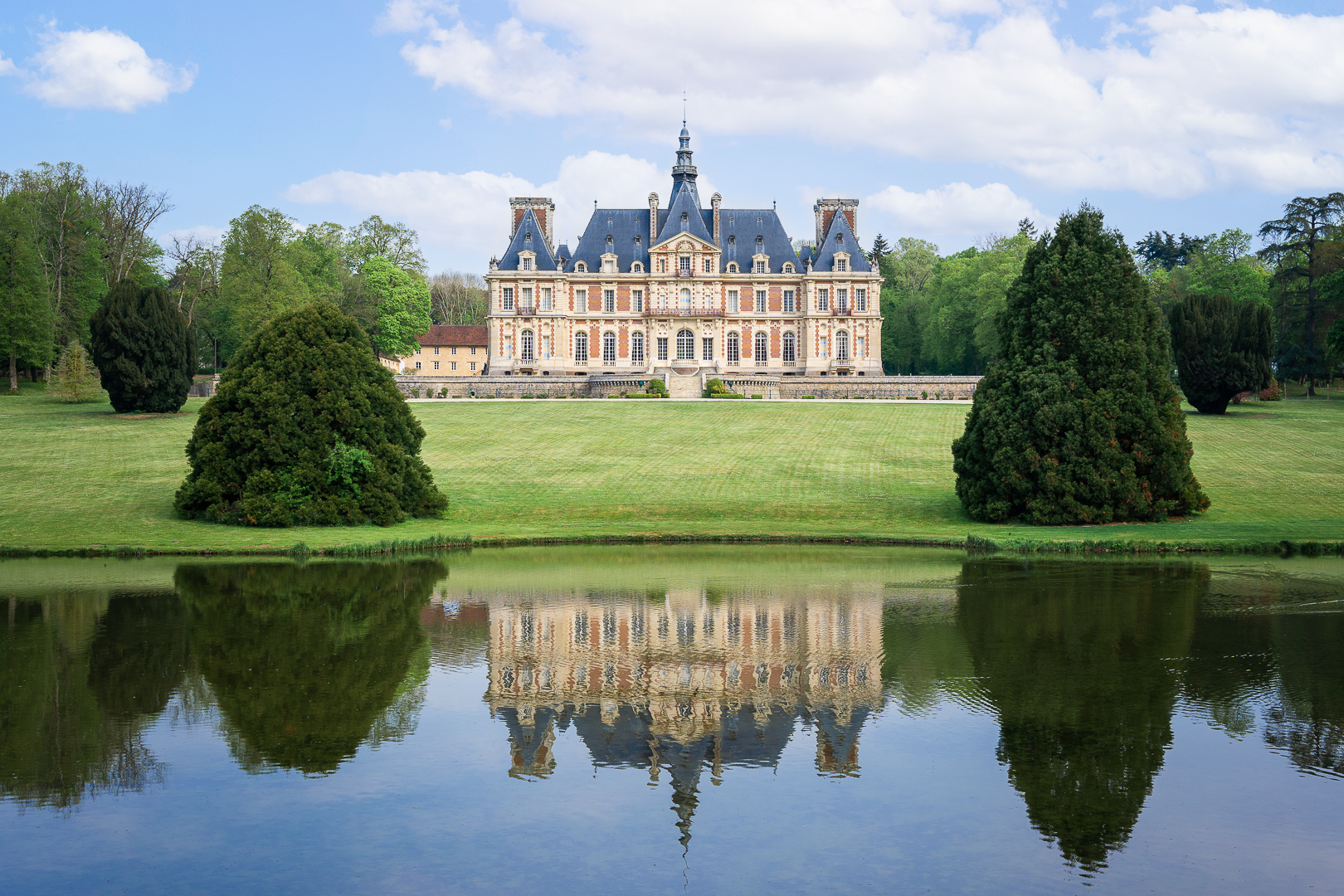

Site information
- Type: château

Location
- Location within France
- Coordinates: 48°26′53″N 1°43′52″E

The Château de Baronville is located between Paris and Chartres in France between the towns of Béville-le-Comte and Oinville-sous-Auneau, Eure-et-Loir.

It rises in the center of a vast park anchored with several lakes. The château was built for grand receptions during the Second Empire and hosted many prestigious guests. The harmonious architecture of the building is the result of a union between spaciousness and refinement in the classical style.

The palace can be visited in group visits and can be rented exclusively. At Baronville, you may celebrate your wedding, hold a seminar or a business meeting, launch a product, or use for a photo shoot or film setting.

== From the Roman Empire to the Counts de Rougé d’Aligre ==
Nowadays' Baronville is the third château built on the same place.

The name Baronville dates back to the Roman Empire. It was at this time that the place was called Baronis Villa, meaning 'house of the baron', itself a title held by 'hommes forts', who were charged with the protection of the empire's borders. In the Middle Ages, the château was a fortified manor house, of which there still remains a significant part of the drainage system, the foundations and cellars. Local legend has it that the Pucelle d'Orléans, or Saint Joan of Arc, saved Baronville and the surrounding countryside from English occupation during the Hundred Years' War.

Between 1620 and 1623, a Louis XIII château was built on the same site by Claude de Montescot and his son, Jacques.

In 1783, the d'Aligre family bought Baronville. Originally from Chartres, this family had already given two great chancellors of France and Gardes des Sceaux: Etienne Ist, Marquis d'Aligre, Chancellor of France from 1624 to 1635, and Etienne II, Marquis d'Aligre, Chancellor from 1674 to 1677. Etienne François, Marquis d'Aligre and Count de Marans spent a considerable part of his fortune in restoring the château and its former gardens.

The property of the d'Aligre family, as well as their name and titles, were transferred by marriage to the noble house of the marquess of Pomereu by royal command on 21 December 1825. Armand, marquis de Pomereu d'Aligre, demolished the second château in 1867 and commissioned the architect Léon de Sanges to design the present château, which was finished in 1868. The same talented workers worked on the roofs of Baronville, of Mont Saint-Michel (France) and on the Statue of Liberty in New York (USA).

During the First World War, Catherine de Clermont-Tonnerre, Viscountess de Pomereu d'Aligre, set up a military hospital on the estate. During World War II, Field-Marshal Friedrich Paulus made his headquarters in Baronville, and several other German units (including the Luftwaffe) occupied the Château. After decades of restorations of the park and the palace, it could be rented for exclusive events since 1980.

The Estate is now home of the Count and Countess de Rougé d’Aligre (see House of Rougé), since the last Pomereu d'Aligre of this line married Count Claude de Rougé.

In 2011, the Count Aymeric de Rougé d’Aligre, great-grandson of the Marquis de Pomereu d'Aligre, restored (or "rebuilt") most of the Carrousel de Baronville, in order to host events and seminars. This part opened in 2012, after one year of refurbishments. Aymeric de Rougé manages the entire estate. In 2020, the count de Rougé converts the entire estate into organic farming, making it one of the largest organic estates in the department of Eure-et-Loir and the Paris area. Count de Rougé is also owner of the Champagne Comte de Rougé.

As of 2022, the Baronville estate undergoes thorough renovation under the management of its owners, Count Aymeric and Countess Beatrice (granddaughter of US congressman Oliver P. Bolton) de Rougé d’Aligre.

== Famous guests ==
Among other famous guests, Baronville hosted Texas’ first lady Anita Thigpen Perry, Pippa Middleton, sister of the princess of Wales, Paul Pogba, Geoffrey Kondogbia, American model Hilary Rhoda, Korean actress Han Ye-seul, Chinese actress Angelababy, Brazilian footballer Ronaldo, French actress Audrey Tautou, Italian-American actor Alessandro Nivola, Daniela Cicarelli, Roger Hanin, Belgian filmstar Benoît Poelvoorde, Prince Jean of Luxembourg, Anne Fontaine, Abdullah bin Abdul Aziz Al Saud, King of Saudi Arabia, French actress Marie Gillain, Sir Elton John, Mr. Pierre Salinger, Michel Galabru, French actor, Emperor Bảo Đại, 13th and last emperor of Vietnam, Charlotte Casiraghi, Philippe Séguin, as well as a considerable number of French ministers, international diplomats and many others.

== See also ==
- Carrousel de Baronville
- List of châteaux in Eure-et-Loir

== Sources ==
- Official Website of the Chateau de Baronville
