= Carrousel de Baronville =

Group of buildings in Baronville, Eure-et-Loir, France

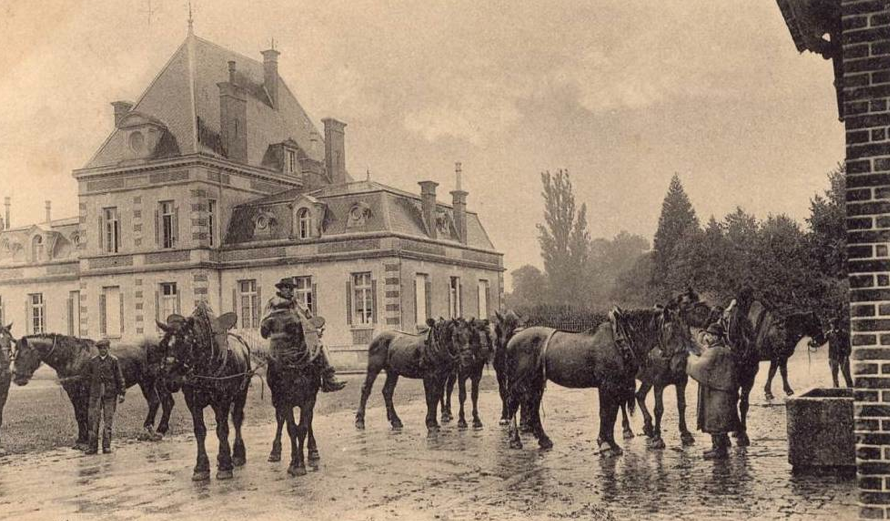
The Chatelet or "little chateau" of the Carrousel de Baronville, around 1900.

The Carrousel de Baronville is a group of buildings located in the hamlet of Baronville, close to the towns of Béville-le-Comte and Oinville-sous-Auneau, in France . The name refers to the château de Baronville, and to the equestrian vocation of the site.

== History ==
It was built in 1882 by the Marquis de Pomereu d'Aligre, who also rebuilt, a few years before, the château of the same name. In the end of the 19th century, the Carrousel de Baronville was considered to be one of the most modern and efficient farms of France, as well as a splendid ensemble, to host the numerous horses of the Marquis.

During the Second World War, a small part of the buildings was destroyed by fire.

In 2011, Count Aymeric de Rougé, great-grand son of the Marquis de Pomereu d'Aligre, restored (nearly "rebuilt") the Bretagne wing of the Carrousel de Baronville, in order to host weddings, events and seminars. It opened in 2012, after one year of refurbishments.

Since then, Aymeric de Rougé has been hosting charity events on a regular basis to raise funds for the local school "Ecole Saint Joseph d'Auneau", the national League against cancer "Ligue contre le cancer", the Fondation d'Aligre, or the local voluntary firefighters brigade.

== Links ==
- Official site of the Carrousel de Baronville
