= Harold K. Claypool =

American politician

Member of the U.S. House of Representatives from Ohio's 11th district
- In office January 3, 1937 – January 3, 1943
- Preceded by: Peter Francis Hammond
- Succeeded by: Walter E. Brehm

Personal details
- Born: Harold Kile Claypool; June 2, 1886 Bainbridge, Ross County, Ohio, U.S.
- Died: August 2, 1958 (aged 72) Chillicothe, Ohio, U.S.
- Resting place: Grandview Cemetery
- Party: Democratic
- Education: Ohio State University

Harold Kile Claypool (June 2, 1886 – August 2, 1958) was a 19th-century American businessman and politician who for three terms was a U.S. representative from Ohio from 1937 to 1943.

He was the son of Horatio Clifford Claypool and cousin of John B. Peterson.

== Biography ==
Born in Bainbridge, Ross County, Ohio, Claypool attended the public schools and Ohio State University at Columbus. He engaged in the publishing business at Columbus, Ohio, and published Hunter and Trader Magazine. He was deputy probate judge of Ross County, Ohio.

=== Congress ===
Claypool was elected as a Democrat to the Seventy-fifth, Seventy-sixth, and Seventy-seventh Congresses (January 3, 1937 – January 3, 1943).

He was an unsuccessful candidate for reelection in 1942 to the Seventy-eighth Congress.

=== Later career ===
He resumed the publishing and office supply business. He served as United States marshal for the southern district of Ohio from 1944 to 1953.

=== Death and burial ===
Claypool died in Chillicothe, Ohio, on August 2, 1958. He was interred in Grandview Cemetery, Chillicothe, Ross County, Ohio, USA.

== Sources ==
- United States Congress. "Harold K. Claypool (id: C000489)". Biographical Directory of the United States Congress.

U.S. House of Representatives
Preceded by Peter F. Hammond	Member of the U.S. House of Representatives from Ohio's 11th congressional district January 3, 1937 – January 3, 1943	Succeeded by Walter E. Brehm
