= John McCormack (Ohio politician) =

American politician

Member of the Ohio House of Representatives from the 18th district
- In office January 3, 1973 – December 31, 1974
- Preceded by: Edward Ryder
- Succeeded by: Dennis Eckart

Personal details
- Born: 1944 or 1945 (age 81–82)
- Party: Democratic

John McCormack is a former member of the Ohio House of Representatives.
