= Lester LeFevre Cecil =

American judge (1893–1982)

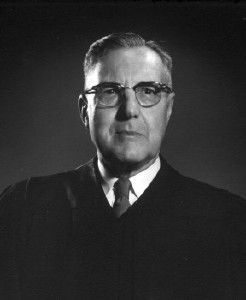

Senior Judge of the United States Court of Appeals for the Sixth Circuit
- In office August 1, 1965 – November 26, 1982

Chief Judge of the United States Court of Appeals for the Sixth Circuit
- In office 1962–1963
- Preceded by: Shackelford Miller Jr.
- Succeeded by: Paul Charles Weick

Judge of the United States Court of Appeals for the Sixth Circuit
- In office July 18, 1959 – August 1, 1965
- Appointed by: Dwight D. Eisenhower
- Preceded by: Potter Stewart
- Succeeded by: Anthony J. Celebrezze

Judge of the United States District Court for the Southern District of Ohio
- In office April 23, 1953 – July 28, 1959
- Appointed by: Dwight D. Eisenhower
- Preceded by: Robert Reasoner Nevin
- Succeeded by: Carl Andrew Weinman

Personal details
- Born: Lester LeFevre Cecil; November 21, 1893 Miami County, Ohio, U.S.
- Died: November 26, 1982 (aged 89)
- Education: University of Michigan Law School (LLB)

Lester LeFevre Cecil (November 21, 1893 – November 26, 1982) was a United States circuit judge of the United States Court of Appeals for the Sixth Circuit and previously was a United States district judge of the United States District Court for the Southern District of Ohio.

== Education and career ==
Born in Miami County, Ohio, Cecil received a Bachelor of Laws from the University of Michigan Law School in 1917. He was in private practice in Dayton, Ohio from 1917 to 1922, interrupted briefly by his service as a Sergeant in the United States Army during World War I, in 1918. He was prosecuting attorney for Dayton from 1922 to 1925. He was a Judge of the Municipal Court of Dayton from 1926 to 1929, and of the Montgomery County Court of Common Pleas from 1929 to 1953.

== Federal judicial service ==
Cecil was nominated by President Dwight D. Eisenhower on April 1, 1953, to a seat on the United States District Court for the Southern District of Ohio vacated by Judge Robert Reasoner Nevin. He was confirmed by the United States Senate on April 23, 1953, and received his commission the same day. His service terminated on July 28, 1959, due to his elevation to the Sixth Circuit.

Cecil was nominated by President Eisenhower on February 17, 1959, to a seat on the United States Court of Appeals for the Sixth Circuit vacated by Judge Potter Stewart. He was confirmed by the Senate on July 15, 1959, and received his commission on July 18, 1959. He served as Chief Judge and as a member of the Judicial Conference of the United States from 1962 to 1963. He assumed senior status on August 1, 1965. His service terminated on November 26, 1982, due to his death.

Legal offices
Preceded by Robert Reasoner Nevin	Judge of the United States District Court for the Southern District of Ohio; 1953–1959	Succeeded by Carl Andrew Weinman
Preceded by Potter Stewart	Judge of the United States Court of Appeals for the Sixth Circuit; 1959–1965	Succeeded by Anthony J. Celebrezze
Preceded by Shackelford Miller Jr.	Chief Judge of the United States Court of Appeals for the Sixth Circuit; 1962–1963	Succeeded by Paul Charles Weick
