= Carl Andrew Weinman =

American judge

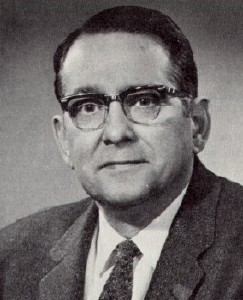

Senior Judge of the United States District Court for the Southern District of Ohio
- In office March 1, 1973 – February 5, 1979

Chief Judge of the United States District Court for the Southern District of Ohio
- In office 1962–1973
- Preceded by: Mell G. Underwood
- Succeeded by: Joseph Peter Kinneary

Judge of the United States District Court for the Southern District of Ohio
- In office September 8, 1959 – March 1, 1973
- Appointed by: Dwight D. Eisenhower
- Preceded by: Lester LeFevre Cecil
- Succeeded by: Robert Morton Duncan

Personal details
- Born: Carl Andrew Weinman; January 27, 1903 Steubenville, Ohio, US
- Died: February 5, 1979 (aged 76)
- Party: Republican
- Education: University of Michigan (A.B.); University of Michigan Law School (J.D.)

Carl Andrew Weinman (January 27, 1903 – February 5, 1979) was a United States district judge of the United States District Court for the Southern District of Ohio.

== Early life and education ==
Weinman was born in Steubenville, Ohio on January 27, 1903, the son of Andrew G. and Dorothea (Becker) Weinman. A musically talented trumpet player in his youth, he joined the musician's union at the age of 14 and worked his way through the University of Michigan, directing the marching band for two years. Weinman received his Artium Baccalaureus degree from the University of Michigan in 1924, and a Juris Doctor from the University of Michigan Law School in 1926.

== Career ==
Weinman was admitted to the Ohio bar in 1925 and commenced practice in Steubenville as an associate in the law firm of Cohen & Gardner. From 1932 to 1936, during the Great Depression, Weinman served two terms as Steubenville city solicitor, an elected post. In 1937, Weinman was elected Judge of the Court of Common Pleas for Jefferson County, Ohio. He served on the common pleas bench for 12 years before returning to private practice in 1949 as a partner and principal trial attorney in the firm of Beckman, Weinman and Anglin. During the 1950s, Weinman was a member of the state Republican committee. From 1956 to 1960, Weinman served as a member and later as chairman of the Ohio Board of Commissioners on Grievances and Discipline for the Government of the Bar of Ohio.

== Federal judicial service ==
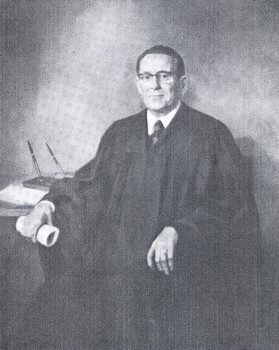
Judicial portrait of Weinman, 1976, by John M. King.

On July 28, 1959, Weinman was nominated by President Dwight D. Eisenhower to a seat on the United States District Court for the Southern District of Ohio vacated by Judge Lester LeFerve Cecil. Weinman was confirmed by the United States Senate on September 2, 1959, and received his commission on September 8, 1959, entering onto duty on September 28, 1959. Weinman served as Chief Judge from 1962 to 1973, assuming senior status on March 1, 1973, and continuing to hear criminal cases in that capacity until his death on February 5, 1979.

=== Notable cases ===
Among the notable cases heard by Weinman as a federal judge were the appeal of the murder conviction of Sam Sheppard; the antitrust case of Elder-Beerman Stores against the Federated Department Stores, and a lawsuit involving a mid-air collision of two airplanes which was among the first of its kind.

== Sources ==
Legal offices
Preceded by Lester LeFevre Cecil	Judge of the United States District Court for the Southern District of Ohio; 1959–1973	Succeeded by Robert Morton Duncan
Preceded by Mell G. Underwood	Chief Judge of the United States District Court for the Southern District of Ohio; 1962–1973	Succeeded by Joseph Peter Kinneary
