= Hezekiah S. Bundy =

American politician (1817–1895)

Hezekiah Sanford Bundy
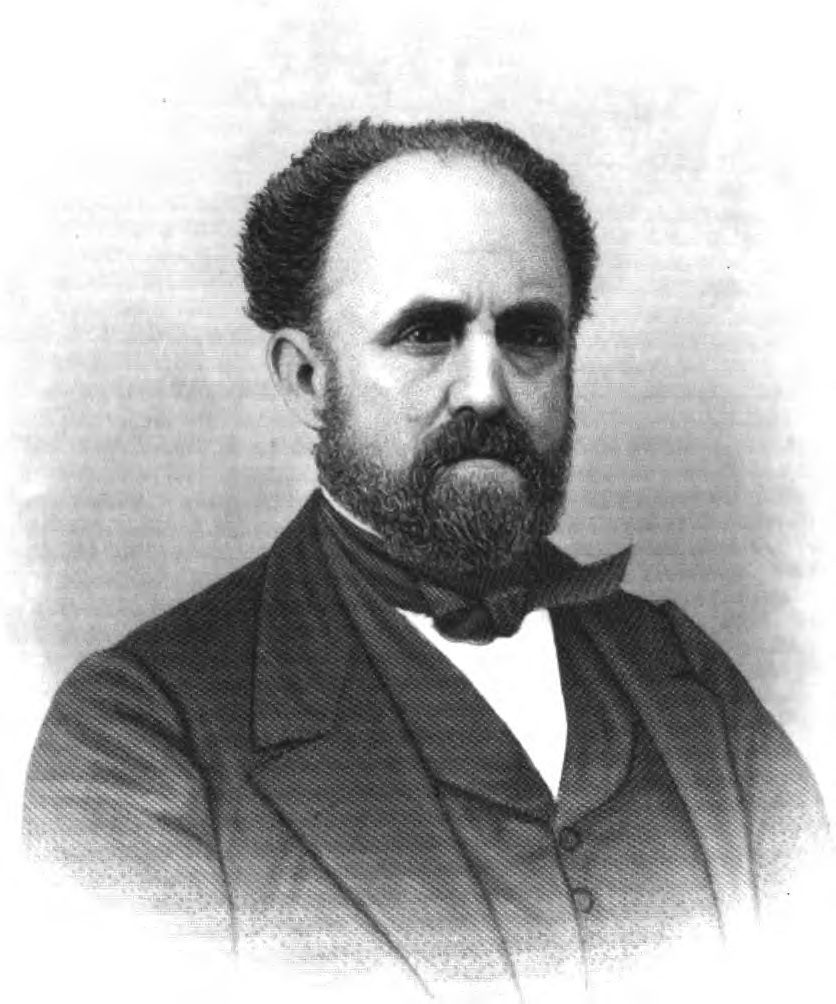
- 1874

Member of the U.S. House of Representatives from Ohio
- In office December 4, 1893 – March 3, 1895
- Preceded by: William H. Enochs
- Succeeded by: Lucien J. Fenton
- Constituency: 10th district
- In office March 4, 1873 – March 3, 1875
- Preceded by: John Thomas Wilson
- Succeeded by: John L. Vance
- Constituency: 11th district
- In office March 4, 1865 – March 3, 1867
- Preceded by: Wells A. Hutchins
- Succeeded by: John Thomas Wilson
- Constituency: 11th district

Member of the Ohio Senate from the 7th district
- In office January 7, 1856 – January 3, 1858
- Preceded by: Thomas McCauslin
- Succeeded by: George Corwine

Member of the Ohio House of Representatives from the Jackson County district
- In office December 4, 1848 – December 2, 1849 Serving with Anselm T. Holcomb
- Preceded by: Anselm T. Holcomb
- Succeeded by: Anselm T. Holcomb; Joseph M. Ross
- In office December 2, 1850 – January 4, 1852
- Preceded by: Anselm T. Holcomb; Joseph M. Ross
- Succeeded by: D. T. Hard

Personal details
- Born: August 15, 1817 Marietta, Ohio, U.S.
- Died: December 12, 1895 (aged 78) Wellston, Ohio, U.S.
- Party: Republican
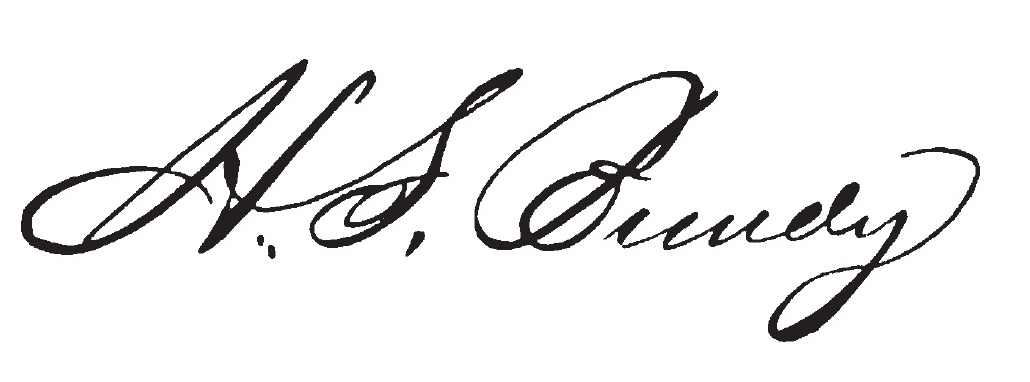
- Signature

Hezekiah Sanford Bundy (August 15, 1817 – December 12, 1895) was a U.S. representative from Ohio.

== Biography ==
Born in Marietta, Ohio, Bundy moved with his parents to Athens County in 1819. He attended the public schools. He engaged in agricultural pursuits. He studied law. He was admitted to the bar in 1850 and practiced until 1860 when he became engaged in the iron business. He served as member of the State house of representatives in 1848 and 1850. He served in the State senate in 1855. Presidential elector for Lincoln/Hamlin in 1860. He was an unsuccessful candidate for election in 1862 to the Thirty-eighth Congress.

Bundy was elected as a Republican to the Thirty-ninth Congress (March 4, 1865 – March 3, 1867). He declined to be a candidate for renomination in 1866.

Bundy was a trustee of Ohio University beginning in 1864. Bundy was elected to the Forty-third Congress (March 4, 1873 – March 3, 1875). He served as chairman of the Committee on Mileage (Forty-third Congress). He was an unsuccessful candidate for reelection in 1874 to the Forty-fourth Congress. He moved to Wellston, Jackson County, in 1887 and resumed the practice of law.

Bundy was elected to the Fifty-third Congress to fill the vacancy caused by the death of William H. Enochs and served from December 4, 1893, to March 3, 1895. He died in Wellston, Ohio, December 12, 1895. He was interred in the City Cemetery.

His daughter Julia Ann married Joseph B. Foraker, a prominent Ohio politician in the end of the 19th century and early 20th who served as governor of Ohio.

== Sources ==
- United States Congress. "Hezekiah S. Bundy (id: B001059)". Biographical Directory of the United States Congress.

- Smith, Joseph P, ed. (1898). History of the Republican Party in Ohio. Vol. I. Chicago: the Lewis Publishing Company.
- Walker, Charles M (1869). History of Athens County, Ohio And Incidentally of the Ohio Land Company and the First Settlement of the State at Marietta etc. Robert Clarke & Co. pp. 346–348. ISBN 9780608396323.

U.S. House of Representatives
Preceded by Wells A. Hutchins	Member of the U.S. House of Representatives from Ohio's 11th congressional district March 4, 1865-March 3, 1867	Succeeded by John T. Wilson
Preceded by John T. Wilson	Member of the U.S. House of Representatives from Ohio's 11th congressional district March 4, 1873-March 3, 1875	Succeeded by John L. Vance
Preceded by William H. Enochs	Member of the U.S. House of Representatives from Ohio's 10th congressional district December 4, 1893-March 3, 1895	Succeeded by Lucien J. Fenton
