= Joseph Peter Kinneary =

American judge (1905–2003)

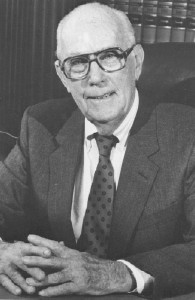

Senior Judge of the United States District Court for the Southern District of Ohio
- In office December 31, 1986 – February 14, 2003

Chief Judge of the United States District Court for the Southern District of Ohio
- In office 1973–1975
- Preceded by: Carl Andrew Weinman
- Succeeded by: Timothy Sylvester Hogan

Judge of the United States District Court for the Southern District of Ohio
- In office July 22, 1966 – December 31, 1986
- Appointed by: Lyndon B. Johnson
- Preceded by: Mell G. Underwood
- Succeeded by: George Curtis Smith

Personal details
- Born: Joseph Peter Kinneary; September 19, 1905 Cincinnati, Ohio, U.S.
- Died: February 14, 2003 (aged 97) Upper Arlington, Ohio, U.S.
- Education: University of Notre Dame (B.A.); University of Cincinnati College of Law (LL.B.)

Joseph Peter Kinneary (September 19, 1905 – February 14, 2003) was a United States district judge of the United States District Court for the Southern District of Ohio. The Joseph P. Kinneary U.S. Courthouse in Downtown Columbus is named for him.

== Education and career ==
Born in Cincinnati, Ohio, Kinneary graduated from St. Xavier High School in 1924, and received a Bachelor of Arts degree from the University of Notre Dame in 1928 and a Bachelor of Laws from the University of Cincinnati College of Law in 1935. He was in private practice in Cincinnati and in Columbus, Ohio, from 1935 to 1961. He was an assistant state attorney general of Ohio from 1937 to 1939. He served as a captain in the United States Army during World War II. He was a lecturer at the University of Cincinnati College of Law in 1948. He was a first assistant state attorney general of Ohio from 1949 to 1951. He was special counsel in the office of the Ohio Attorney General from 1959 to 1961. He was United States Attorney for the Southern District of Ohio from 1961 to 1966.

== Federal judicial service ==
Kinneary was nominated by President Lyndon B. Johnson on June 28, 1966, to a seat on the United States District Court for the Southern District of Ohio vacated by Judge Mell G. Underwood. He was confirmed by the United States Senate on July 22, 1966, received his commission on July 22, 1966, and took the oath of office on August 5, 1966. He served as Chief Judge from 1973 to 1975. He assumed senior status on December 31, 1986. He took inactive senior status on August 31, 2001, at which time he was the oldest actively serving federal judge. His service terminated on February 14, 2003, due to his death in Upper Arlington, Ohio.

== Sources ==
Legal offices
Preceded by Mell G. Underwood	Judge of the United States District Court for the Southern District of Ohio; 1966–1986	Succeeded by George Curtis Smith
Preceded by Carl Andrew Weinman	Chief Judge of the United States District Court for the Southern District of Ohio; 1973–1975	Succeeded by Timothy Sylvester Hogan
