= Edwin D. Ricketts =

American politician

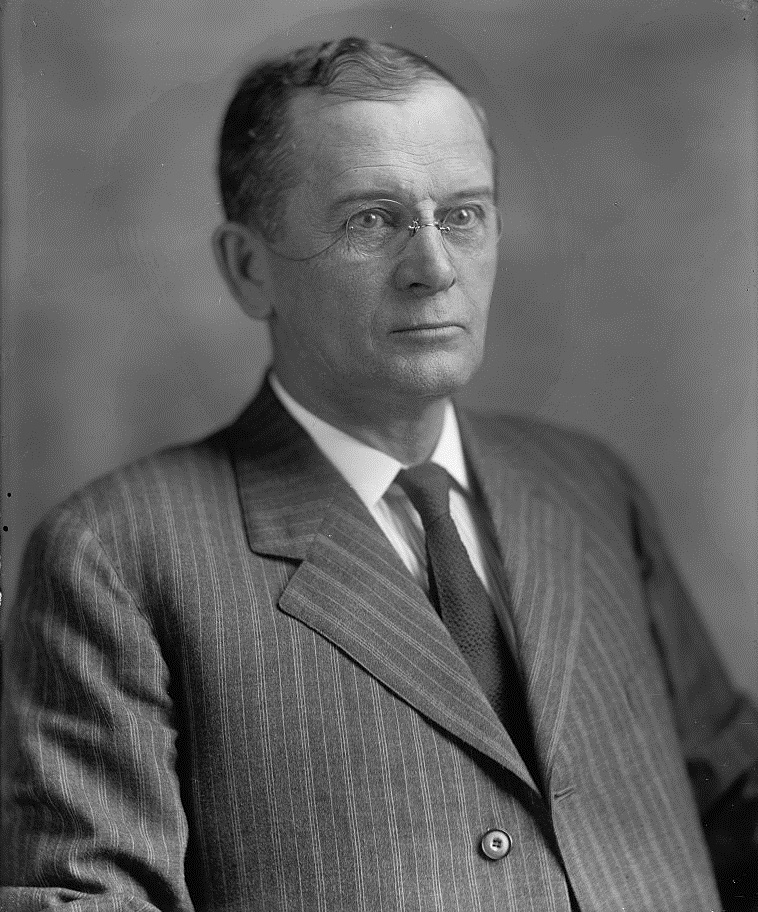

Member of the U.S. House of Representatives from Ohio's 11th district
- In office March 4, 1915 – March 3, 1917
- Preceded by: Horatio C. Claypool
- Succeeded by: Horatio C. Claypool
- In office March 4, 1919 – March 3, 1923
- Preceded by: Horatio C. Claypool
- Succeeded by: Mell G. Underwood

Personal details
- Born: Edwin Darlington Ricketts; August 3, 1867 Maxville, Ohio, U.S.
- Died: July 3, 1937 (aged 69) Logan, Ohio, U.S.
- Resting place: Oak Grove Cemetery, Logan
- Party: Republican

Edwin Darlington Ricketts (August 3, 1867 – July 3, 1937) was an American educator, lawyer and politician who served as a U.S. representative from Ohio for three terms in the early 20th century.

== Biography ==
Born near Maxville, Ohio, Ricketts attended the public schools. For twelve years, he was a teacher and superintendent of schools. He then studied law and was admitted to the bar in 1899 and commenced practice in Logan, Ohio.

=== Congress ===
Ricketts was elected as a Republican to the Sixty-fourth Congress (March 4, 1915 – March 3, 1917). He was an unsuccessful candidate for reelection in 1916 to the Sixty-fifth Congress.

Ricketts was elected to the Sixty-sixth and Sixty-seventh Congresses (March 4, 1919 – March 3, 1923). He was an unsuccessful candidate for reelection in 1922 to the Sixty-eighth Congress.

=== Later career and death ===
He then resumed the practice of law and served as delegate to the Republican National Convention in 1928.

Ricketts died in Logan, Ohio, on July 3, 1937, and was interred in Oak Grove Cemetery.

== Sources ==
- United States Congress. "Edwin D. Ricketts (id: R000236)". Biographical Directory of the United States Congress.

U.S. House of Representatives
Preceded by Horatio C. Claypool	Member of the U.S. House of Representatives from Ohio's 11th congressional district March 4, 1915 – March 3, 1917	Succeeded by Horatio C. Claypool
Preceded by Horatio C. Claypool	Member of the U.S. House of Representatives from Ohio's 11th congressional district March 4, 1919 – March 3, 1923	Succeeded by Mell G. Underwood
