= Oliver P. Bolton =

American politician (1917–1972)

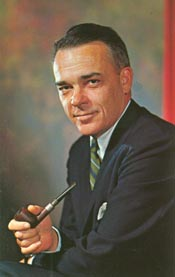

Member of the U.S. House of Representatives from Ohio's 11th district
- In office January 3, 1963 – January 3, 1965
- Preceded by: Robert E. Cook
- Succeeded by: J. William Stanton
- In office January 3, 1953 – January 3, 1957
- Preceded by: Walter E. Brehm
- Succeeded by: David S. Dennison

Personal details
- Born: Oliver Payne Bolton; February 22, 1917 Cleveland, Ohio, U.S.
- Died: December 13, 1972 (aged 55) Palm Beach, Florida, U.S.
- Resting place: Lake View Cemetery
- Party: Republican
- Spouse: Adelaide Brownlee (m. 1940)
- Relations: Henry B. Payne (great-grandfather); Charles B. Bolton (brother)
- Children: 3
- Parent(s): Chester C. Bolton (father); Frances P. Bingham (mother)
- Education: Harvard University; Case Western Reserve University School of Law

Military service
- Allegiance: United States
- Branch/service: United States Marine Corps
- Years of service: 1941–1946
- Unit: V Amphibious Corps
- Battles/wars: Pacific Theater of World War II

Oliver Payne Bolton (February 22, 1917 – December 13, 1972) was an American politician of the Republican Party who served in the United States House of Representatives from 1953 to 1957 and from 1963 to 1965. In 1953, he and his mother, Frances P. Bolton, became the first mother and son to serve simultaneously in Congress. His father, Chester C. Bolton, also served in Congress.

== Early life ==
Bolton was born in Cleveland, Ohio, on February 22, 1917. His father, Chester Castle Bolton, represented Ohio's 22nd congressional district in the House of Representatives from 1929 to 1939. Upon his father's death in office, his mother Frances P. Bolton won a special election to succeed Chester and served in Congress from 1940 to 1969. His great-grandfather Henry B. Payne also represented Ohio in both the House of Representatives and the United States Senate.

He graduated from Milton, Massachusetts Academy in 1935, and Harvard University in 1939 and Case Western Reserve University School of Law in 1947. He was admitted to the bar in 1947, and began practice in Cleveland.

== Career ==
After college, he served as a member of the Ohio National Guard in the 170th Cavalry. After the United States' entry into World War II. He went on active duty in the United States Army and served though 1946, including one year in the Pacific Theater of Operations in the V Amphibious Corps.

Bolton was chairman of the Ohio Young Republicans in 1948 and 1949. He was the Young Republicans national committeeman from Ohio in 1950 and 1951. From 1952 to 1963 he published the Lake County The News-Herald (Ohio) and Dover, Ohio Daily Reporter.

=== Political career ===
In 1952, congressional redistricting removed a part of his mother's congressional district and allocated it to Ohio's 11th congressional district. Bolton entered the race and won, which marked the first time a mother and son would serve together in Congress. He served two terms in the 83rd and 84th Congresses. After a heart attack in 1956, he declined to run for a third term. After leaving Congress, he was the director of commerce for the state of Ohio from February to August 1957.

In 1962, he returned to politics and defeated incumbent Robert E. Cook in the 1962 midterm elections but served only one term. Bolton voted for the Civil Rights Act of 1964. In 1964, he switched to run for Ohio's at-large seat that Robert Taft Jr. gave up to run for Senate. With President Lyndon B. Johnson defeating Senator Barry Goldwater in the 1964 presidential election by a then-record one million votes, Bolton lost his seat to Robert E. Sweeney.

After his political career, he joined the investment bank Prescott, Merrill, Turben & Co.

== Personal life ==
He married his wife, Adelaide Brownlee, on October 4, 1940. They had three children: two sons and one daughter.

His granddaughter Beatrice Gratry married Count Aymeric de Rougé d’Aligre, owner of the Chateau de Baronville, near Paris, France.

=== Death and burial ===
He died of heart failure December 13, 1972, at Palm Beach, Florida, and was buried at Lake View Cemetery, Cleveland.

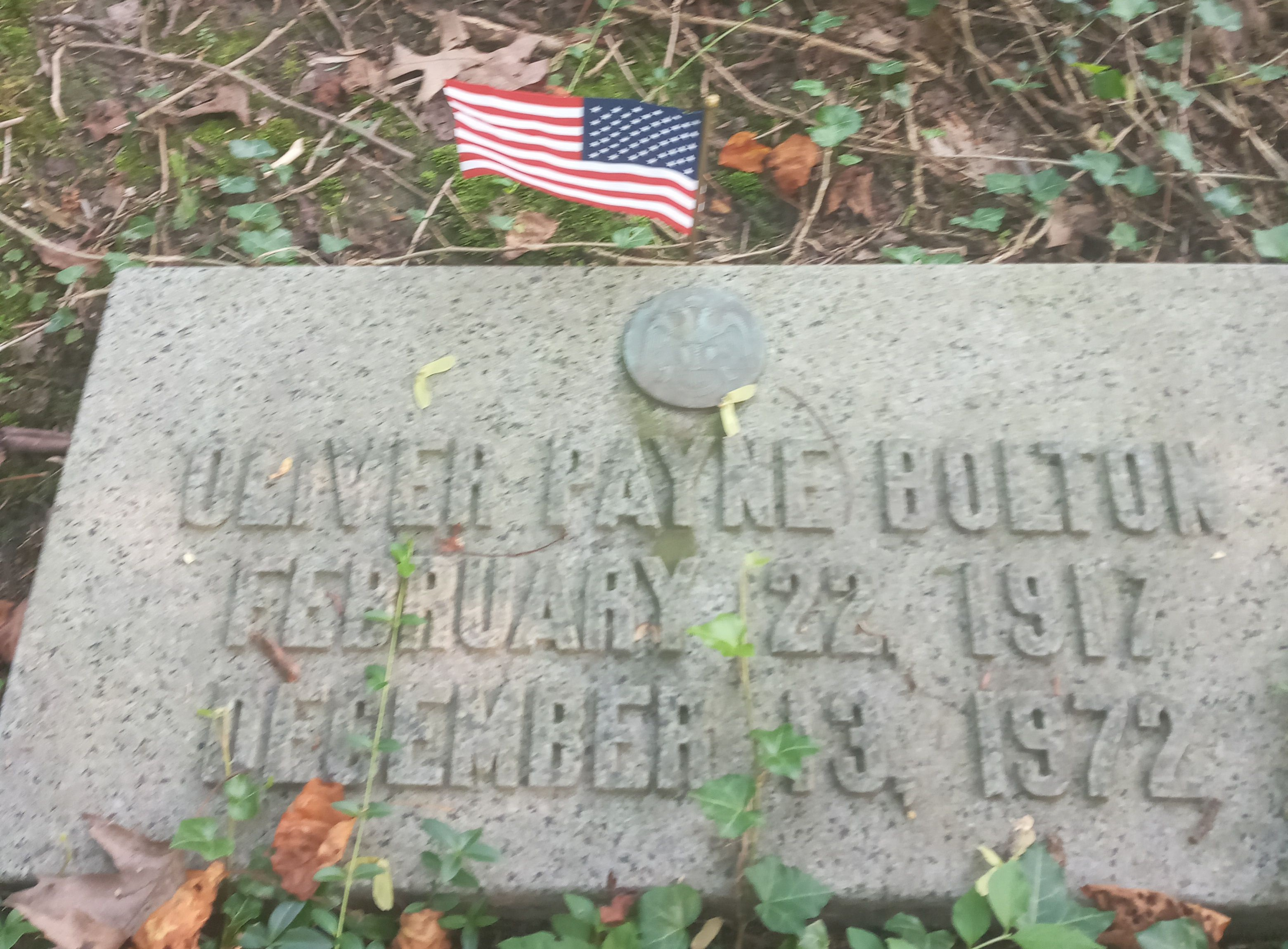
The gravesite of Congressman Oliver P. Bolton

== See also ==
- United States Congress. "Oliver P. Bolton (id: B000608)". Biographical Directory of the United States Congress.
- WATJ (a Chardon, Ohio radio station he co-founded under the WBKC calls in 1969)

U.S. House of Representatives
Preceded by Walter E. Brehm	Member of the U.S. House of Representatives from Ohio's 11th congressional district January 3, 1953 – January 3, 1957	Succeeded by David S. Dennison
Preceded by Robert E. Cook	Member of the U.S. House of Representatives from Ohio's 11th congressional district January 3, 1963 – January 3, 1965	Succeeded by J. William Stanton
