= Mell G. Underwood =

American judge

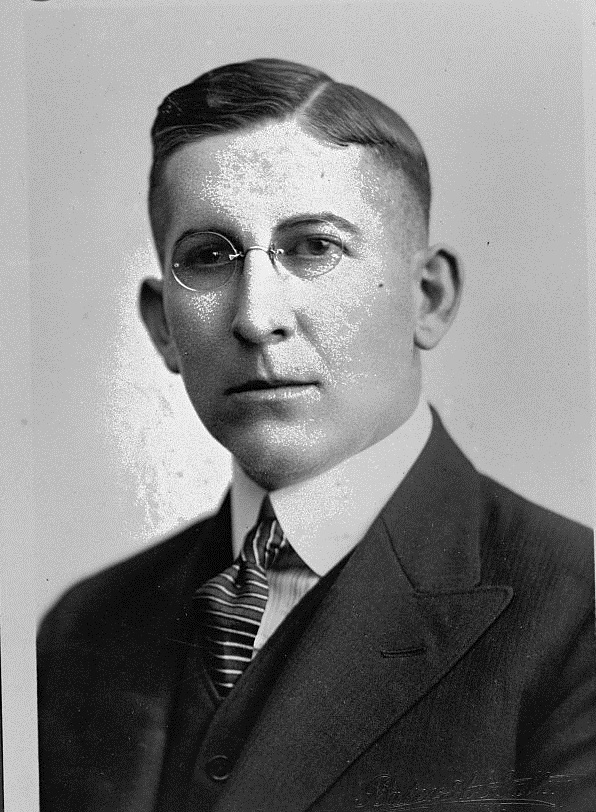
- Underwood in 1923

Senior Judge of the United States District Court for the Southern District of Ohio
- In office December 31, 1965 – March 8, 1972

Chief Judge of the United States District Court for the Southern District of Ohio
- In office 1953–1962
- Preceded by: Robert Reasoner Nevin
- Succeeded by: Carl Andrew Weinman

Judge of the United States District Court for the Southern District of Ohio
- In office February 12, 1936 – December 31, 1965
- Appointed by: Franklin D. Roosevelt
- Preceded by: Benson W. Hough
- Succeeded by: Joseph Peter Kinneary

Member of the U.S. House of Representatives from Ohio's 11th district
- In office March 4, 1923 – April 10, 1936
- Preceded by: Edwin D. Ricketts
- Succeeded by: Peter Francis Hammond

Personal details
- Born: Mell Gilbert Underwood; January 30, 1892 Rose Farm, Ohio, U.S.
- Died: March 8, 1972 (aged 80) New Lexington, Ohio, U.S.
- Resting place: Maplewood Cemetery
- Party: Democratic
- Education: Ohio State University Moritz College of Law read law

Mell Gilbert Underwood (January 30, 1892 – March 8, 1972) was an American educator and lawyer who served as a United States representative from Ohio and a United States district judge of the United States District Court for the Southern District of Ohio.

== Education and career ==
Born at Rose Farm in rural Morgan County, Ohio, Underwood attended the public schools. He was graduated from the New Lexington High School in 1911. He taught in the public schools of New Lexington for several years. Underwood studied at the Ohio State University Moritz College of Law at Columbus, and then read law to be admitted to the bar in 1915. He entered private practice in New Lexington from 1915 to 1923. He was a prosecuting attorney of Perry County, Ohio from 1917 to 1921.

== Congressional service ==
Underwood was an unsuccessful Democratic candidate for election in 1920 to the 67th United States Congress. Eventually elected as a Democrat to the United States House of Representatives of the 68th United States Congress and the six succeeding Congresses, he served from March 4, 1923, to April 10, 1936. He was Chairman of the Committee on Invalid Pensions for the 72nd through the 74th United States Congresses.

== Federal judicial service ==
On January 27, 1936, Underwood was nominated by President Franklin D. Roosevelt to a seat on the United States District Court for the Southern District of Ohio vacated by Judge Benson W. Hough. Underwood was confirmed by the United States Senate on February 4, 1936, and received his commission on February 12, 1936. He served as Chief Judge from 1953 to 1962, assuming senior status on December 31, 1965.

=== Death and burial ===
Underwood served in that capacity until his death on March 8, 1972, on his farm near New Lexington and was buried nearby in Maplewood Cemetery.

== Sources ==
- United States Congress. "Mell G. Underwood (id: U000012)". Biographical Directory of the United States Congress.

U.S. House of Representatives
Preceded by Edwin D. Ricketts	Member of the U.S. House of Representatives from Ohio's 11th congressional district 1923–1936	Succeeded by Peter Francis Hammond
Legal offices
Preceded by Benson W. Hough	Judge of the United States District Court for the Southern District of Ohio; 1936–1965	Succeeded by Joseph Peter Kinneary
Preceded by Robert Reasoner Nevin	Chief Judge of the United States District Court for the Southern District of Ohio; 1953–1962	Succeeded by Carl Andrew Weinman
