= J. William Stanton =

American politician (1924–2002)

John William Stanton
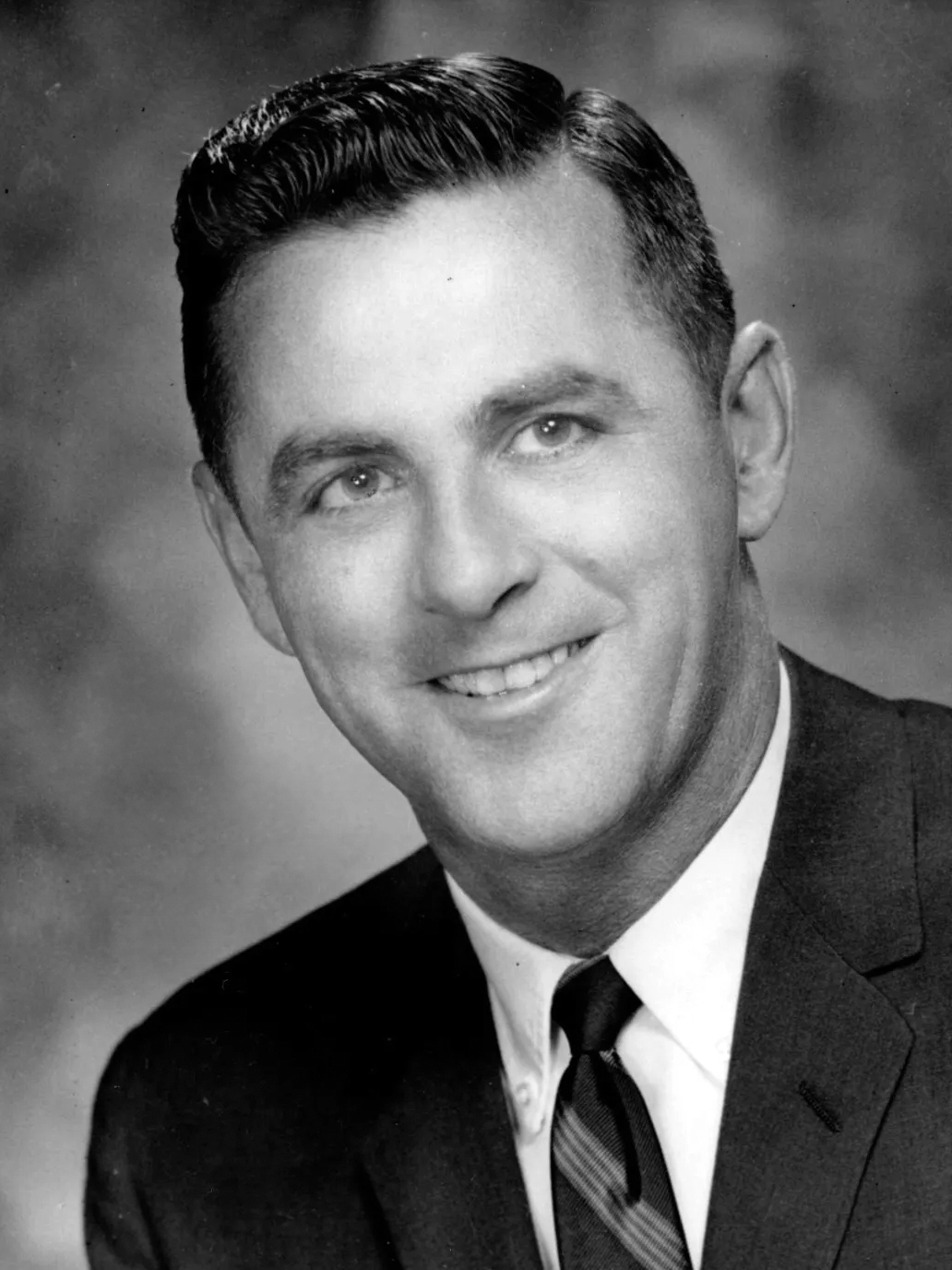

Member of the U.S. House of Representatives from Ohio's 11th district
- In office January 3, 1965 – January 3, 1983
- Preceded by: Oliver P. Bolton
- Succeeded by: Dennis E. Eckart

Personal details
- Born: February 20, 1924 Painesville, Ohio, U.S.
- Died: April 11, 2002 (aged 78) Jacksonville, Florida, U.S.
- Party: Republican
- Spouse: Peggy Stanton
- Education: Georgetown University
- Awards: Bronze Star, Purple Heart

John William Stanton (February 20, 1924 – April 11, 2002) was an American politician who served as a Republican U.S. representative from Ohio from 1965 to 1983. He was married to Peggy Stanton, a graduate of Marquette University, and ABC News' first female Washington correspondent.

== Biography ==
Stanton was born in Painesville, Ohio. His father, Francis Michael Stanton, was a World War I veteran who lived for many years in Cleveland, Ohio in the house next door to Jerry Siegal, the creator of Superman. Stanton's mother, Mary Callinan Stanton, was the daughter of Bridge (Delia) Sexton Callinan, an Irish immigrant who worked as an upstairs maid in the wealthy suburb of Bratenahl. His maternal grandfather, Matthew Callinan, a streetcar conductor, died on November 16, 1895, in what was then one of the largest transportation accidents in American history, when the streetcar he was riding on plunged over an open viaduct into the river. Stanton was one of six children, four of whom died before the age of 21. Stanton was an Eagle Scout, and was awarded the Distinguished Eagle Scout Award by the National Eagle Scout Association in March 2002. He graduated from Culver Military Academy in June 1942 and received his draft notice on Thanksgiving Day. He spent the next four years in Hawaii, New Guinea, and the Philippines with the 33rd Infantry Division Reconnaissance Troop, where he received the Bronze Star and the Purple Heart. He briefly considered attending the School of Foreign Service at Georgetown University but the line was too long, so he switched to business administration. In 1949, Stanton graduated from Georgetown University, having also been president of the senior class for that year.

Stanton was a businessman by profession. After college, he followed in his father's footsteps and opened his own Lincoln-Mercury dealership in Painesville, where one of his salespeople was Don Shula, who later became coach of the Miami Dolphins football team. The business grew into one of the largest Ford Motor Co. franchises. He decided to run for county commissioner after county-wide regulations prohibited a plant that was planning on locating in Painesville, Ohio to relocate in Lorain, Ohio. He was elected Lake County commissioner in 1956 and 1960.

Stanton often said he chose to be a Republican because it was the party of Abraham Lincoln, but he considered himself socially liberal and fiscally conservative. His New York Times obituary noted he was a friend to both business leaders and labor organizations. He was elected as a Republican to the 89th to 97th Congresses, (January 3, 1965 – January 3, 1983).

Stanton voted in favor of the Voting Rights Act of 1965, the Medicare program for the elderly (being one of six Ohio Republican representatives to do so), and the Civil Rights Act of 1968.

He did not seek election to the 98th United States Congress, and later served as an executive at the World Bank. He died in Jacksonville, Florida on April 11, 2002. Stanton is, to date, the last Republican to represent Ohio's 11th district in Congress.

U.S. House of Representatives
Preceded by Oliver P. Bolton	Member of the U.S. House of Representatives from Ohio's 11th congressional district January 3, 1965 – January 3, 1983	Succeeded by Dennis E. Eckart
Preceded by Albert W. Johnson	Ranking Member of the House Banking, Finance and Urban Affairs Committee; 1977–1983	Succeeded by Chalmers Wylie
