= Albert Douglas =

American politician

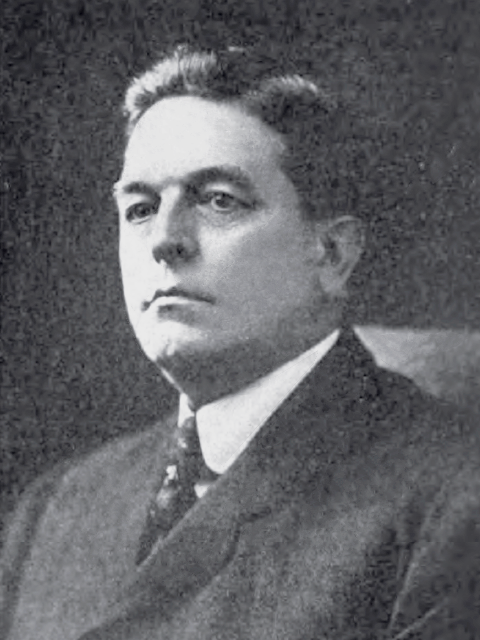

Member of the U.S. House of Representatives from Ohio's 11th district
- In office March 4, 1907 – March 3, 1911
- Preceded by: Charles H. Grosvenor
- Succeeded by: Horatio C. Claypool

Personal details
- Born: April 25, 1852 Chillicothe, Ohio, U.S.
- Died: March 14, 1935 (aged 82) Washington, D.C., U.S.
- Party: Republican

Albert Douglas (April 25, 1852 – March 14, 1935) was an American lawyer and politician who served two terms as a U.S. representative from Ohio from 1907 to 1911.

== Biography ==
Born in Chillicothe, Ohio, Douglas attended the public schools of Chillicothe and a preparatory school. He graduated from Kenyon College, Gambier, Ohio, in 1872 and from Harvard Law School in 1874. He was admitted to the bar in 1874 and commenced practice in Chillicothe, Ohio. He served as prosecuting attorney of Ross County 1877–1881. Presidential elector in 1896 for McKinley/Hobart.

Douglas was elected as a Republican to the Sixtieth and Sixty-first Congresses (March 4, 1907 – March 3, 1911). He was an unsuccessful candidate for reelection in 1910 to the Sixty-second Congress, and resumed the practice of law in Chillicothe, Ohio. He was appointed Ambassador Extraordinary to represent the United States at the centennial of the independence of Peru in 1921. He retired and resided in Washington, D.C., until his death in that city on March 14, 1935. He was interred in Grandview Cemetery, Chillicothe, Ross County, Ohio, USA.

== Sources ==
- United States Congress. "Albert Douglas (id: D000449)". Biographical Directory of the United States Congress.
- Taylor, William Alexander; Taylor, Aubrey Clarence (1899). Ohio statesmen and annals of progress: from the year 1788 to the year 1900 ... Vol. 2. State of Ohio. p. 136.

U.S. House of Representatives
Preceded by Charles H. Grosvenor	Member of the U.S. House of Representatives from Ohio's 11th congressional district March 4, 1907 – March 3, 1911	Succeeded by Horatio C. Claypool
