= Valentine B. Horton =

American politician (1802–1888)

Valentine Horton
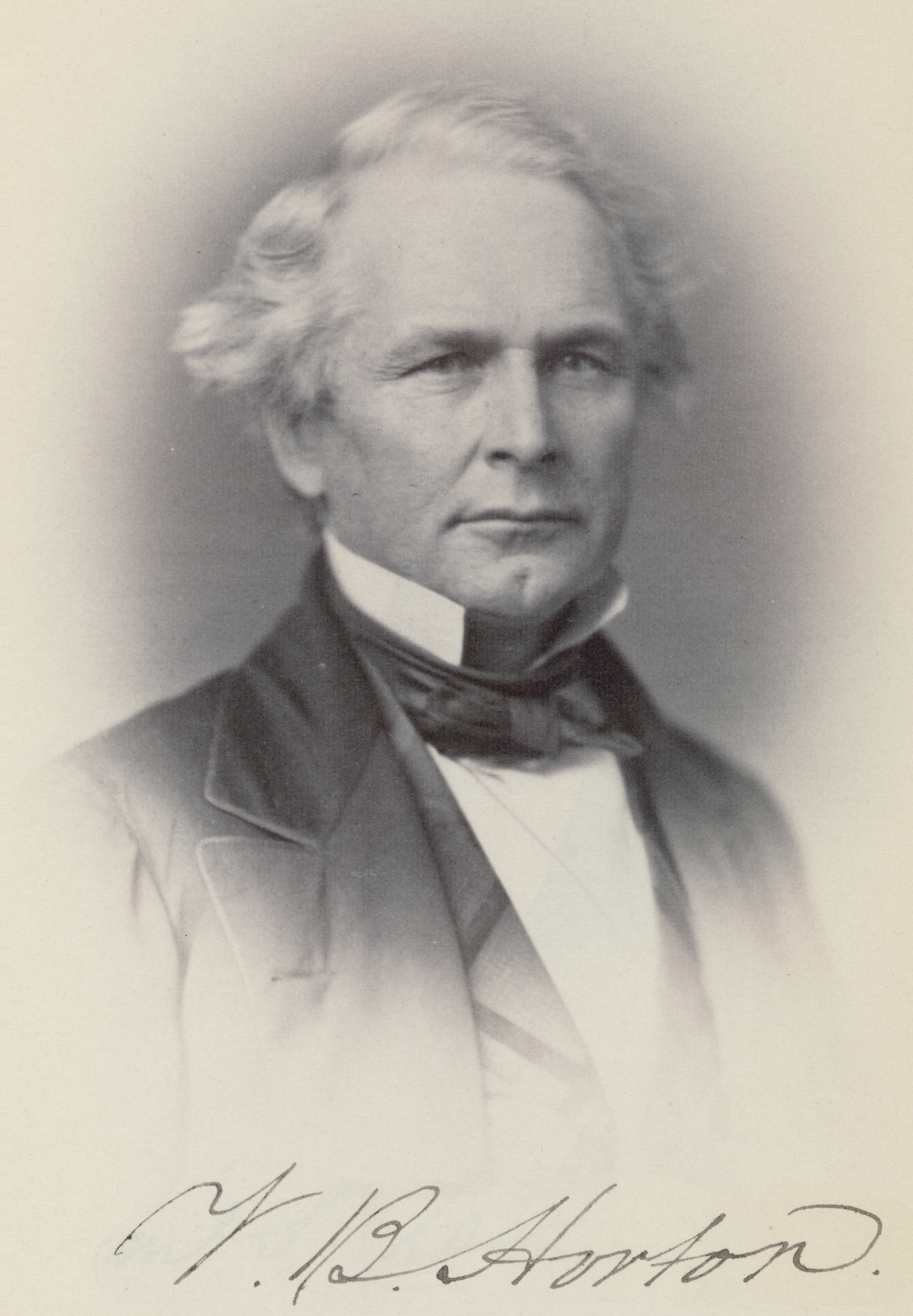
- in 35th Congress

Member of the U.S. House of Representatives from Ohio's 11th district
- In office March 4, 1855 – March 3, 1859
- Preceded by: Thomas Ritchey
- Succeeded by: Charles D. Martin
- In office March 4, 1861 – March 3, 1863
- Preceded by: Charles D. Martin
- Succeeded by: Wells A. Hutchins

Personal details
- Born: Valentine Baxter Horton; January 29, 1802 Windsor, Vermont, U.S.
- Died: January 14, 1888 (aged 85) Pomeroy, Ohio, U.S.
- Resting place: Beech Grove Cemetery
- Party: Anti-Nebraska, Republican
- Education: Partridge Military School
- Occupation: Lawyer and politician

Valentine Baxter Horton (January 29, 1802 – January 14, 1888) was a 19th-century American lawyer who was a three-term U.S. representative from Ohio around the time of the American Civil War.

== Biography ==
Born in Windsor, Vermont, Horton attended the Partridge Military School and afterward became one of its tutors. He studied law in Middletown, Connecticut, and was admitted to the bar in 1830.

=== Early career ===
He moved to Pittsburgh, Pennsylvania, where he practiced.

He moved to Cincinnati, Ohio, in 1833, and on to Pomeroy, Ohio, in 1835. He engaged in the sale and transportation of coal and the development of the salt industry.

He served as member of the State constitutional convention in 1850.

=== Congress ===
Horton was elected as an Anti-Nebraska candidate to the Thirty-fourth Congress, and was reelected as a Republican to the Thirty-fifth Congress (March 4, 1855 – March 3, 1859). He was not a candidate for renomination in 1858.

He served as member of the Peace Conference of 1861 held in Washington, D.C., in an effort to devise means to prevent the impending war. He engaged in coal mining.

Horton was elected as a Republican to the Thirty-seventh Congress (March 4, 1861–March 3, 1863). He was not a candidate for renomination in 1862 and returned to his home.

=== Death and burial ===
He died in Pomeroy, Ohio, January 14, 1888, and was interred in Beech Grove Cemetery.

U.S. House of Representatives
Preceded by Thomas Ritchey	Member of the U.S. House of Representatives from Ohio's 11th congressional district 1855–1859	Succeeded by Charles D. Martin
Preceded by Charles D. Martin	Member of the U.S. House of Representatives from Ohio's 11th congressional district 1861–1863	Succeeded by Wells A. Hutchins
