= Peter Francis Hammond =

American politician

Peter F. Hammond

Member of the U.S. House of Representatives from Ohio's 11th district
- In office November 3, 1936 – January 3, 1937
- Preceded by: Mell G. Underwood
- Succeeded by: Harold K. Claypool

Personal details
- Born: Peter Francis Hammond; June 30, 1887 Lancaster, Ohio, U.S.
- Died: April 2, 1971 (aged 83) Lancaster, Ohio, U.S.
- Resting place: St. Mary's Cemetery
- Party: Democratic
- Education: Pontifical College Josephinum

Peter Francis Hammond (June 30, 1887 – April 2, 1971) was a politician and member of the United States House of Representatives from Ohio for two months from November 1936 to January 1937.

== Biography ==
Born in Lancaster, Ohio, he attended a private Catholic high school and entered college in Columbus, Ohio at Josephinum College.

A tailor by trade, he opened his own clothing store in 1913.

=== Congress ===
On November 3, 1936, Hammond was victorious in a special election to fill the remaining term of Mell G. Underwood. He served as a Democrat for several months, but did not run in the election held the same day for the following term.

=== Later career ===
After leaving Congress, he briefly returned to his store, before becoming postmaster of Lancaster, Ohio in 1938. He retired from this position in 1954.

=== Death and burial ===
He died in Lancaster on April 2, 1971 at the age of 83.

U.S. House of Representatives
Preceded by Mell G. Underwood	Member of the U.S. House of Representatives from Ohio's 11th congressional district November 3, 1936 – January 3, 1937	Succeeded by Harold K. Claypool
