= Wells A. Hutchins =

American politician

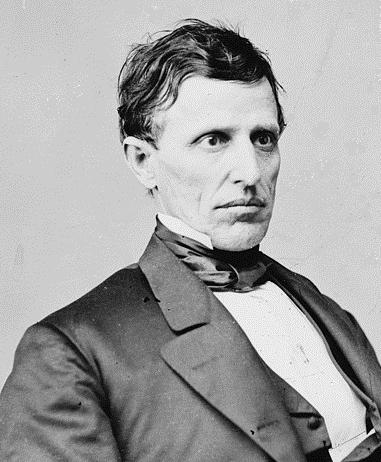

Member of the U.S. House of Representatives from Ohio's 11th district
- In office March 4, 1863 – March 3, 1865
- Preceded by: Valentine B. Horton
- Succeeded by: Hezekiah S. Bundy

Member of the Ohio House of Representatives from the Scioto County district
- In office January 5, 1852 – January 1, 1854
- Preceded by: Oscar F. Moore
- Succeeded by: Samuel J. Huston

Personal details
- Born: Wells Andrews Hutchins; October 8, 1818 Hartford, Ohio, U.S.
- Died: January 25, 1895 (aged 76) Portsmouth, Ohio, U.S.
- Resting place: Greenlawn Cemetery, Portsmouth
- Party: Whig; Democratic
- Spouse: Cornelia Robinson

Wells Andrews Hutchins (October 8, 1818 – January 25, 1895) was an American lawyer and politician who served as a U.S. representative from Ohio during the American Civil War.

== Early life and education ==
Born in Hartford, Ohio, Hutchins was a first cousin to future congressman John Hutchins. He attended public schools and then taught school. He later studied law and was admitted to the bar in 1841. He commenced practice in Warren, Ohio.

== Career ==
In 1842, Hutchins moved to Portsmouth, Ohio, where he served as a member of the State house of representatives in 1852 and 1853. He was a Whig while in Portsmouth. He was the city solicitor from 1857 to 1861. He was an unsuccessful candidate in 1860 to the Thirty-seventh Congress. During the early part of the Civil War, he was the United States provost marshal for the state of Ohio in 1862.

=== Congress ===
Hutchins was elected as a Democrat to the Thirty-eighth Congress (March 4, 1863 – March 3, 1865). A War Democrat, he supported Abraham Lincoln's agenda at critical moments. Hutchins called the proclamation Lincoln issued on September 15, 1863 under the authority of the Habeas Corpus Suspension Act of 1863 "necessary" in order to defeat the rebellion. He was one of only 16 Democrats in the House of Representatives who joined with the Republicans and voted to ratify the Thirteenth Amendment to the United States Constitution on January 31, 1865. That amendment abolished slavery in the United States. By doing so, he became one of a group who had "defied their party discipline, and had deliberately and with unfaltering faith marched to their political death", according to abolitionist Congressman James Mitchell Ashley.

He was an unsuccessful candidate in 1864 for reelection to the Thirty-ninth Congress, and again in 1880 to the Forty-seventh Congress.

== Later career and death ==
On February 23, 1843, Hutchins married Cornelia Robinson of Portsmouth.

Hutchins resumed the practice of law in Portsmouth. He died there January 25, 1895, and was interred in Greenlawn Cemetery. He died of kidney disease.

== Legacy ==
A Congressman loosely based on him is portrayed by actor Walton Goggins in the 2012 film Lincoln.

== Notes ==
U.S. House of Representatives
Preceded by Valentine B. Horton	Member of the U.S. House of Representatives from Ohio's 11th congressional district March 4, 1863 – March 3, 1865	Succeeded by Hezekiah S. Bundy
