= Edward Ryder =

American politician

Ed Ryder
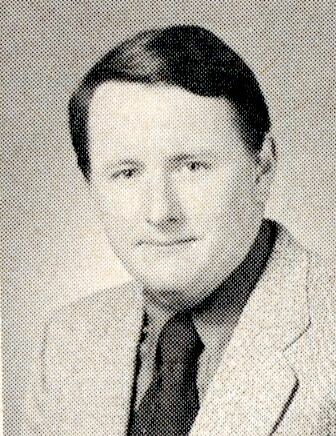

Member of the Ohio House of Representatives from the 53rd district
- In office December 15, 1971 – December 31, 1972
- Preceded by: George Voinovich
- Succeeded by: John McCormack

Personal details
- Born: May 4, 1948 Cleveland, Ohio, U.S.
- Died: April 7, 2024 (aged 75)
- Party: Republican

Edward Michael Ryder Jr. (May 4, 1948 – April 7, 2024) was an American politician who served as a Republican member of the Ohio House of Representatives.

Ryder was born in Cleveland, Ohio, the son of Edward M. Sr. and Elizabeth (née Freeman) Ryder. He graduated from Cleveland State University in 1970 and Cleveland-Marshall Law School in 1977. He served as the clerk of the Euclid City Council and also as the Newbury Township Trustee. When elected to the state house in 1970, he became its youngest member; he served on the Interstate Legislate Committee on Lake Erie, and opposed a jet port near Euclid that would have caused Euclid to be split by a new highway.

He moved to Geauga County, Ohio, in 1979, and he would later chair the county Republican party and sit on the county board of elections. He would serve as a trial attorney from 1984 to 2014, as a delegate to the 2012 Republican National Convention, and relocated to Boiling Springs, South Carolina in 2022. He died from cancer at the age of 75 on April 7, 2024.
