= Charles D. Martin (politician) =

American judge (1829–1911)

Charles Drake Martin
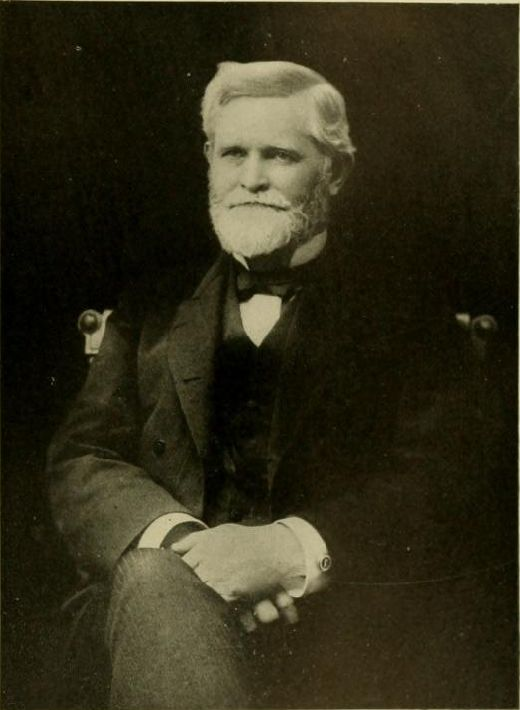

Member of the U.S. House of Representatives from Ohio's 11th district
- In office March 4, 1859 – March 3, 1861
- Preceded by: Valentine B. Horton
- Succeeded by: Valentine B. Horton

Personal details
- Born: August 5, 1829 Mount Vernon, Ohio, U.S.
- Died: August 25, 1911 (aged 82) Lancaster, Ohio, U.S.
- Resting place: Forest Rose Cemetery, Lancaster, Ohio
- Party: Democratic
- Education: Kenyon College

Charles Drake Martin (August 5, 1829 – August 27, 1911) was an American lawyer, jurist, and politician who served one term as a U.S. representative for Ohio from 1859 to 1861.

== Biography ==
Born in Mount Vernon, Ohio, Martin attended the public schools and Kenyon College, Gambier, Ohio. He studied law. He was admitted to the bar in 1850 and commenced practice in Lancaster, Ohio.

Martin was elected as a Democrat to the Thirty-sixth Congress (March 4, 1859 – March 3, 1861). He was an unsuccessful candidate for re-election in 1860 to the Thirty-seventh Congress. He resumed the practice of law. He served as member of the Supreme Court Commission of Ohio 1883–1885. He continued the practice of law in Lancaster, Ohio, until his death there August 27, 1911. He was interred in Forest Rose Cemetery.

== Sources ==
- United States Congress. "Charles D. Martin (id: M000171)". Biographical Directory of the United States Congress.

U.S. House of Representatives
Preceded by Valentine B. Horton	Member of the U.S. House of Representatives from Ohio's 11th congressional district March 4, 1859 – March 3, 1861	Succeeded by Valentine B. Horton
