= John Thomas Wilson =

American politician

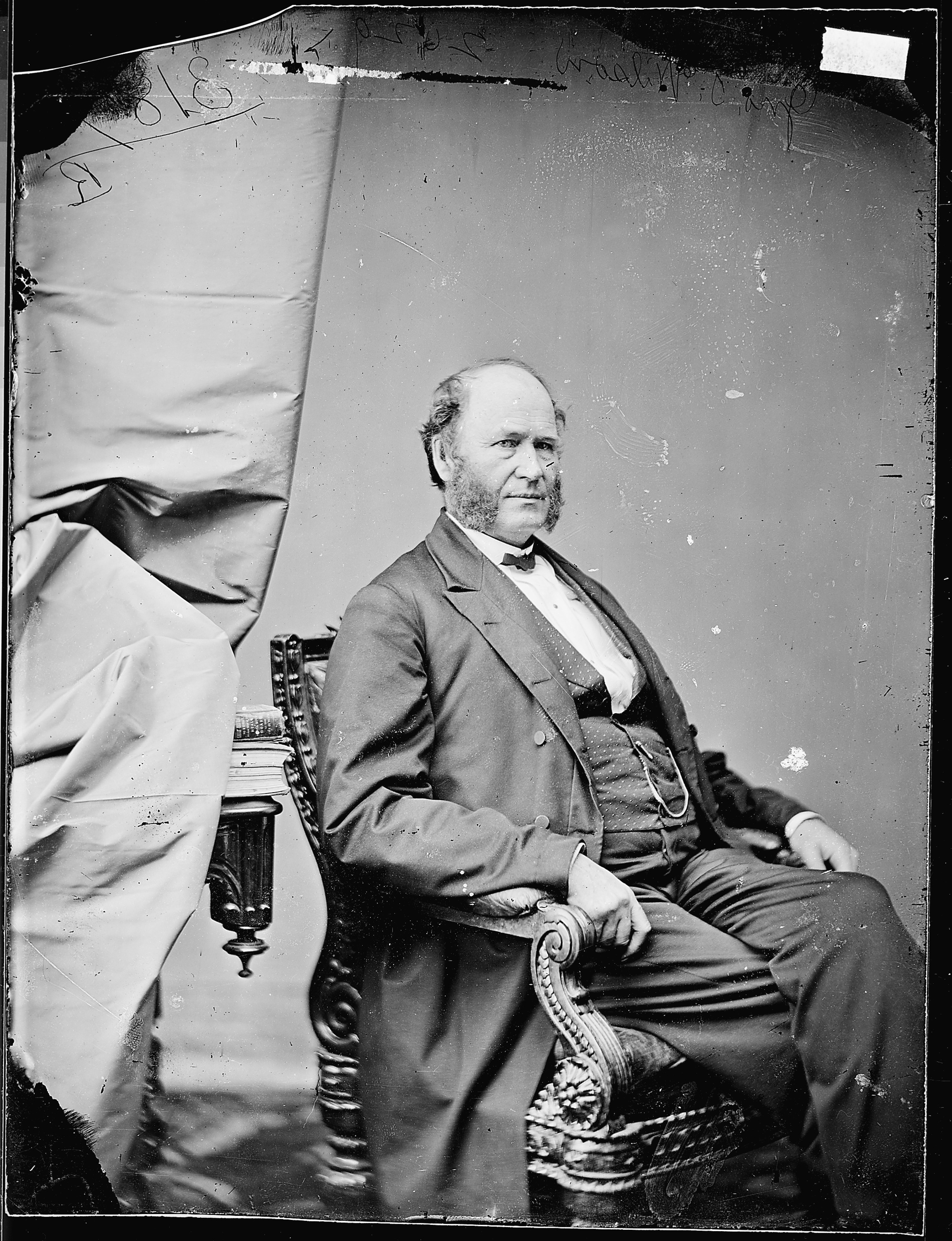

Member of the U.S. House of Representatives from Ohio's 11th district
- In office March 4, 1867 – March 3, 1873
- Preceded by: Hezekiah S. Bundy
- Succeeded by: Hezekiah S. Bundy

Member of the Ohio Senate from the 7th district
- In office January 4, 1864 – January 5, 1868
- Preceded by: Benjamin F. Coates
- Succeeded by: James Emmett

Personal details
- Born: April 16, 1811 Bell, Highland County, Ohio, U.S.
- Died: October 6, 1891 (aged 80) Tranquility, Ohio, U.S.
- Resting place: Tranquility Cemetery
- Party: Republican

Military service
- Allegiance: United States
- Branch/service: (United States) Union Army
- Years of service: 1861-1862
- Rank: Captain
- Unit: 70th Ohio Infantry

John Thomas Wilson (April 16, 1811 – October 6, 1891) was a soldier, attorney and U.S. Representative from Ohio, serving three terms from 1867 to 1873.

== Biography ==
Wilson was born in the village of Bell in rural Highland County, Ohio. As a child, he received a limited schooling and did not have a higher education. He engaged in mercantile and agricultural pursuits.

=== Civil War ===
During the American Civil War, he was appointed as the first lieutenant of Company E, Seventieth Regiment, Ohio Volunteer Infantry on November 2, 1861. He was discharged as a captain on November 27, 1862.

=== Congress ===
He was a member of the Ohio Senate from 1863 to 1866 and was elected as a Republican to the Fortieth, Forty-first, and Forty-second Congresses (serving from March 4, 1867 until March 3, 1873). He was also a chairman on the Committee on Agriculture (Forty-first and Forty-second Congresses). He was an unsuccessful candidate for reelection in 1872 to the Forty-third Congress.

=== Death ===
He died in the village of Tranquillity (near what is now known as Seaman), Adams County, Ohio, at the age of eighty. He is buried in Tranquillity Cemetery. Restored by Ralph and Patricia Alexander, The John T. Wilson Homestead Wilson built and lived in Tranquillity, Ohio still can be visited by the public.

U.S. House of Representatives
Preceded by Hezekiah S. Bundy	Member of the U.S. House of Representatives from Ohio's 11th congressional district March 4, 1867 – March 3, 1873	Succeeded by Hezekiah S. Bundy
