= Horatio C. Claypool =

American politician

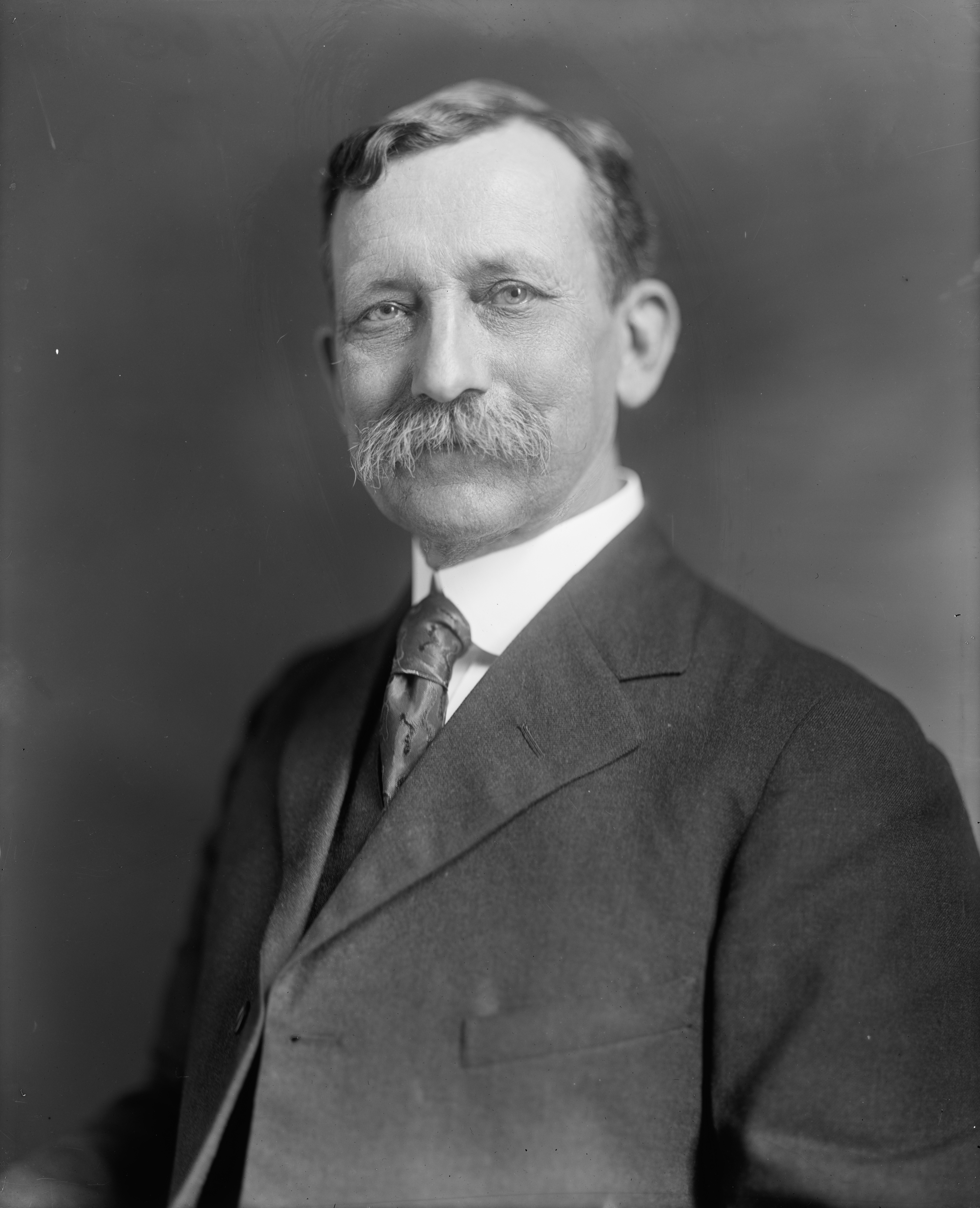

Member of the U.S. House of Representatives from Ohio's 11th district
- In office March 4, 1911 – March 3, 1915
- Preceded by: Albert Douglas
- Succeeded by: Edwin D. Ricketts
- In office March 4, 1917 – March 3, 1919
- Preceded by: Edwin D. Ricketts
- Succeeded by: Edwin D. Ricketts

Personal details
- Born: Horatio Clifford Claypool; February 9, 1859 McArthur, Ohio, U.S.
- Died: January 19, 1921 (aged 61) Columbus, Ohio, U.S.
- Resting place: Grandview Cemetery, Chillicothe, Ohio
- Party: Democratic
- Education: National Normal University

Horatio Clifford Claypool (February 9, 1859 – January 19, 1921) was an American lawyer and politician who served as a three-term U.S. representative from Ohio. He was the father of Harold Kile Claypool and cousin of John B. Peterson.

== Biography ==
Born in McArthur, Vinton County, Ohio, Claypool attended the common schools, and graduated from National Normal University in Lebanon, Ohio, in 1880.

=== Early career ===
He studied law and was admitted to the bar in 1882 and commenced practice in Chillicothe, Ohio. He served as prosecuting attorney of Ross County from 1899 to 1903 and as probate judge of the county from 1905 to 1910.

=== Congress ===
Claypool was elected as a Democrat to the Sixty-second and Sixty-third Congresses (March 4, 1911 – March 3, 1915). He was an unsuccessful candidate for reelection in 1914 to the Sixty-fourth Congress.

Claypool was elected to the Sixty-fifth Congress (March 4, 1917 – March 3, 1919). He was an unsuccessful candidate for reelection in 1918 to the Sixty-sixth Congress.

He resumed the practice of law in Chillicothe, Ohio.

== Death ==
He died in Columbus, Ohio on January 19, 1921. He was interred in Grandview Cemetery, Chillicothe, Ross County, Ohio, USA.

== Sources ==
- United States Congress. "Horatio C. Claypool (id: C000490)". Biographical Directory of the United States Congress.

U.S. House of Representatives
Preceded by Albert Douglas	Member of the U.S. House of Representatives from Ohio's 11th congressional district March 4, 1911 – March 3, 1915	Succeeded by Edwin D. Ricketts
Preceded by Edwin D. Ricketts	Member of the U.S. House of Representatives from Ohio's 11th congressional district March 4, 1917 – March 3, 1919	Succeeded by Edwin D. Ricketts
