= David S. Dennison Jr. =

American politician (1918–2001)

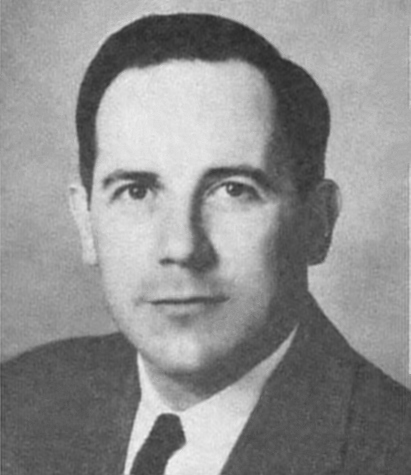

Member of the U.S. House of Representatives from Ohio's 11th district
- In office January 3, 1957 – January 3, 1959
- Preceded by: Oliver P. Bolton
- Succeeded by: Robert E. Cook

Personal details
- Born: David Short Dennison; July 29, 1918 Poland, Ohio
- Died: September 21, 2001 (aged 83) Warren, Ohio
- Party: Republican
- Education: Western Reserve Academy; Williams College; Western Reserve University School of Law

David Short Dennison Jr. (July 29, 1918 – September 21, 2001) was an American politician of the Republican party who served one term in the United States House of Representatives from 1957 to 1959.

== Biography ==
Dennison was born in Poland, Mahoning County, Ohio on July 29, 1918, and graduated from Western Reserve Academy, Hudson, Ohio, in 1936. He graduated from Williams College, Williamstown, Massachusetts, in 1940 and Western Reserve University School of Law, now Case Western Reserve University School of Law, Cleveland, Ohio in 1945.

=== Early career ===
Dennison worked for American Field Service 1942 to 1943, and was a lawyer in private practice. He was special counsel for Warren, Ohio from 1950 to 1951, and special assistant to the Ohio Attorney General from 1953 to 1956.

=== Congress ===
Dennison was elected as a Republican to the 85th United States Congress, (January 3, 1957 - January 3, 1959), and was unsuccessful for election to the 86th and 87th Congresses in 1958 and 1960.

=== Later career ===
After his service in Congress, Dennison was a consultant to the Civil Rights Commission in 1959, and a member of the Federal Trade Commission, 1970–1974. Dennison voted in favor of the Civil Rights Act of 1957. Dennison was later a business executive.

=== Death ===
He died in Warren, Ohio September 21, 2001.

== Sources ==
- United States Congress. "David S. Dennison Jr. (id: D000246)". Biographical Directory of the United States Congress.

U.S. House of Representatives
Preceded by Oliver P. Bolton	Member of the U.S. House of Representatives from Ohio's 11th congressional district January 3, 1957 – January 3, 1959	Succeeded by Robert E. Cook
