= Ohio's 11th congressional district =

U.S. House district for Ohio

Coordinates: 41°36′48″N 81°31′52″W

- Interactive map of district boundaries since January 3, 2023 (Note: The district includes the same census blocks as drawn for the 2020 redistricting cycle in 2022 and during mid-decade redistricting in 2025. As such, boundaries of the district will not change at the 2026 elections.)
- Representative: Shontel Brown; D–Warrensville Heights
- Distribution: 100.00% urban; 0.00% rural
- Population (2025): 755,984
- Median household income: $60,918
- Ethnicity: 44.0% Black; 40.7% White; 7.9% Hispanic; 3.7% Two or more races; 2.9% Asian; 0.7% other
- Cook PVI: D+28

Ohio's 11th congressional district (also known as "Ohio 11") encompasses portions of Cuyahoga County in the Northeast part of the state—including all of Cleveland. It has been represented by Democrat Shontel Brown since 2021.

Ohio has had at least 11 congressional districts since the 1820 census. The district's current general location dates from the 1990 census, when most of the old 21st District was combined with portions of the old 20th District to form the new 11th District centered around Cleveland. Parts of Akron were added to the district when the congressional map was redrawn after the 2010 census, when Ohio lost two seats in the House of Representatives. The district has a Cook Partisan Voting Index of D+28; it is the most Democratic district in Ohio.

It was one of several districts challenged in a 2018 lawsuit seeking to overturn Ohio's congressional map on the basis of unconstitutional gerrymandering. The lawsuit described the 11th District at the time as "a detached shoulder blade with a robotic arm" extending southward from Cleveland to grab its share of Akron. The current district, redistricted again following the 2020 Census and a variety of related constitutional and legislative initiatives and proposals, is a more compact district entirely in Cuyahoga County, including all of Cleveland. Any portion of the county that is not in the 11th is in the 7th.

Following Marcia L. Fudge's resignation on March 10, 2021, a special election was held, with a primary on August 3 and the general election on November 2, as mandated by Ohio law. Shontel Brown won the election, and was sworn in on November 4.

== History ==
The modern-era 11th district came to be as a result of redistricting following the 1990 census, and taking effect for the 1992 election. From then until 2023, it covered eastern Cleveland, including most of that city's majority-black precincts. From 2013 to 2023, it covered portions of Akron.

Following the retirement of Louis Stokes—who was redistricted from the now defunct 21st district to the redrawn 11th, and served three terms there—Stephanie Tubbs Jones served from 1999 through August 20, 2008, when she died in office. Ohio Governor Ted Strickland ordered a special election on November 18, 2008, to fill the remaining month of Jones's term. In addition, the seat was up for election during the November 4, 2008 general election, with the winner of that election to serve a full term beginning on January 3, 2009. Marcia Fudge—the mayor of Warrensville Heights (a Cleveland suburb)—won both the general and special elections and was sworn in on November 19, 2008.

Fudge served eight terms (the last month of Jones's fifth term, followed by six full terms, then three months of another) when she resigned on March 10, 2021, to join President Joe Biden's cabinet as HUD Secretary. In 2021 a special election was held to fill the vacancy, which Cuyahoga County Council member and Cuyahoga County Democratic Party chair Shontel Brown won.

== Composition ==
For the 118th and successive Congresses (based on redistricting following the 2020 census), the district contains all or portions of the following counties, townships, and municipalities:

Cuyahoga County (32)

Beachwood, Bedford, Bedford Heights, Bratenahl, Chagrin Falls (part; also 7th), Chagrin Falls Township, Cleveland, Cleveland Heights, Cuyahoga Heights, East Cleveland, Euclid, Garfield Heights, Gates Mills, Highland Heights, Highland Hills, Hunting Valley, Lakewood, Lyndhurst, Maple Heights, Mayfield, Mayfield Heights, Moreland Hills, Newburgh Heights, North Randall, Orange, Pepper Pike, Richmond Heights, Shaker Heights, South Euclid, University Heights, Warrensville Heights, Woodmere

== Recent election results from statewide races ==
Year	Office	Results
2008	President	Obama 80% - 19%
2012	President	Obama 82% - 18%
2016	President	Clinton 79% - 18%
2016	Senate	Strickland 70% - 25%
2018	Senate	Brown 83% - 17%
2018	Governor	Cordray 78% - 20%
2018	Secretary of State	Clyde 79% - 19%
2018	Treasurer	Richardson Jr. 79% - 21%
2018	Auditor	Space 78% - 18%
2018	Attorney General	Dettelbach 81% - 19%
2020	President	Biden 78% - 21%
2022	Senate	Ryan 80% - 20%
2022	Governor	Whaley 70% - 30%
2022	Secretary of State	Clark 74% - 25%
2022	Treasurer	Schertzer 75% - 25%
2022	Auditor	Sappington 75% - 25%
2022	Attorney General	Crossman 73% - 27%
2024	President	Harris 77% - 22%
2024	Senate	Brown 78% - 19%

== List of members representing the district ==
Member	Party	Years	Cong ress	Electoral history	Counties represented
District established March 4, 1823
John C. Wright (Steubenville)	Democratic-Republican	March 4, 1823 – March 3, 1825	18th 19th 20th	Elected in 1822. Reelected in 1824. Reelected in 1826. Lost reelection.	
John C. Wright (Steubenville)	Anti-Jacksonian	March 4, 1825 – March 3, 1829	18th 19th 20th	Elected in 1822. Reelected in 1824. Reelected in 1826. Lost reelection.	
John M. Goodenow (Steubenville)	Jacksonian	March 4, 1829 – April 9, 1830	21st	Elected in 1828. Resigned to become Judge the Supreme Court of Ohio.	
Vacant		April 9, 1830 – December 6, 1830	21st		
Humphrey H. Leavitt (Steubenville)	Jacksonian	December 6, 1830 – March 3, 1833	21st 22nd	Elected to finish Goodenow's term. Reelected in 1830. Redistricted to the 19th district.	
James M. Bell (Cambridge)	Anti-Jacksonian	March 4, 1833 – March 3, 1835	23rd	Elected in 1832. [data missing]	
William Kennon Sr. (St. Clairsville)	Jacksonian	March 4, 1835 – March 3, 1837	24th	Elected in 1834. [data missing]	
James Alexander Jr. (St. Clairsville)	Whig	March 4, 1837 – March 3, 1839	25th	Elected in 1836. [data missing]	
Isaac Parrish (Cambridge)	Democratic	March 4, 1839 – March 3, 1841	26th	Elected in 1838. [data missing]	
Benjamin S. Cowen (St. Clairsville)	Whig	March 4, 1841 – March 3, 1843	27th	Elected in 1840. [data missing]	
Jacob Brinkerhoff (Mansfield)	Democratic	March 4, 1843 – March 3, 1847	28th 29th	Elected in 1843. Reelected in 1844. [data missing]	
John K. Miller (Mount Vernon)	Democratic	March 4, 1847 – March 3, 1851	30th 31st	Elected in 1846. Reelected in 1848. [data missing]	
George H. Busby (Marion)	Democratic	March 4, 1851 – March 3, 1853	32nd	Elected in 1850. [data missing]	
Thomas Ritchey (Somerset)	Democratic	March 4, 1853 – March 3, 1855	33rd	Elected in 1852. [data missing]	
Valentine B. Horton (Pomeroy)	Anti-Nebraska	March 4, 1855 – March 3, 1857	34th	Elected in 1854. Reelected in 1856. [data missing]	
Valentine B. Horton (Pomeroy)	Republican	March 4, 1857 – March 3, 1859	35th	Elected in 1854. Reelected in 1856. [data missing]	
Charles D. Martin (Lancaster)	Democratic	March 4, 1859 – March 3, 1861	36th	Elected in 1858. [data missing]	
Valentine B. Horton (Pomeroy)	Republican	March 4, 1861 – March 3, 1863	37th	Elected in 1860. [data missing]	
Wells A. Hutchins (Portsmouth)	Democratic	March 4, 1863 – March 3, 1865	38th	Elected in 1862. [data missing]	
Hezekiah S. Bundy (Reeds Mill)	Republican	March 4, 1865 – March 3, 1867	39th	Elected in 1864. [data missing]	
John Thomas Wilson (Tranquility)	Republican	March 4, 1867 – March 3, 1873	40th 41st 42nd	Elected in 1866. Reelected in 1868. Reelected in 1870. [data missing]	
Hezekiah S. Bundy (Wellston)	Republican	March 4, 1873 – March 3, 1875	43rd	Elected in 1872. [data missing]	
John L. Vance (Gallipolis)	Democratic	March 4, 1875 – March 3, 1877	44th	Elected in 1874. [data missing]	
Henry S. Neal (Ironton)	Republican	March 4, 1877 – March 3, 1879	45th	Elected in 1876. Redistricted to the 12th district.	
Henry L. Dickey (Greenfield)	Democratic	March 4, 1879 – March 3, 1881	46th	Redistricted from the 7th district and reelected in 1878. [data missing]	
Henry S. Neal (Ironton)	Republican	March 4, 1881 – March 3, 1883	47th	Redistricted from the 12th district and reelected in 1880. [data missing]	
John W. McCormick (Gallipolis)	Republican	March 4, 1883 – March 3, 1885	48th	Elected in 1882. [data missing]	
William W. Ellsberry (Georgetown)	Democratic	March 4, 1885 – March 3, 1887	49th	Elected in 1884. [data missing]	
Albert C. Thompson (Portsmouth)	Republican	March 4, 1887 – March 3, 1891	50th 51st	Redistricted from the 12th district and reelected in 1886. Reelected in 1888. [data missing]	
John M. Pattison (Milford)	Democratic	March 4, 1891 – March 3, 1893	52nd	Elected in 1890. Lost reelection.	
Charles H. Grosvenor (Athens)	Republican	March 4, 1893 – March 3, 1907	53rd 54th 55th 56th 57th 58th 59th	Elected in 1892. Reelected in 1894. Reelected in 1896. Reelected in 1898. Reelected in 1900. Reelected in 1902. Reelected in 1904. [data missing]	
Albert Douglas (Chillicothe)	Republican	March 4, 1907 – March 3, 1911	60th 61st	Elected in 1906. Reelected in 1908. [data missing]	
Horatio C. Claypool (Chillicothe)	Democratic	March 4, 1911 – March 3, 1915	62nd 63rd	Elected in 1910; Reelected in 1912. [data missing]	
Edwin D. Ricketts (Logan)	Republican	March 4, 1915 – March 3, 1917	64th	Elected in 1914. [data missing]	
Horatio C. Claypool (Chillicothe)	Democratic	March 4, 1917 – March 3, 1919	65th	Elected in 1916. [data missing]	
Edwin D. Ricketts (Logan)	Republican	March 4, 1919 – March 3, 1923	66th 67th	Elected in 1918. Reelected in 1920. [data missing]	
Mell G. Underwood (New Lexington)	Democratic	March 4, 1923 – April 10, 1936	68th 69th 70th 71st 72nd 73rd 74th	Elected in 1922. Reelected in 1924. Reelected in 1926. Reelected in 1928. Reelected in 1930. Reelected in 1932. Reelected in 1934. Resigned to become Judge of the U.S. District Court for the Southern District of Ohio.	
Vacant		April 10, 1936 – November 3, 1936	74th		
Peter F. Hammond (Lancaster)	Democratic	November 3, 1936 – January 3, 1937	74th	Elected to finish Underwood's term. Retired.	
Harold K. Claypool (Chillicothe)	Democratic	January 3, 1937 – January 3, 1943	75th 76th 77th	Elected in 1936. Reelected in 1938. Reelected in 1940. Lost reelection.	
Walter E. Brehm (Millersport)	Republican	January 3, 1943 – January 3, 1953	78th 79th 80th 81st 82nd	Elected in 1942. Reelected in 1944. Reelected in 1946. Reelected in 1948. Reelected in 1950. Retired.	
Oliver P. Bolton (Mentor)	Republican	January 3, 1953 – January 3, 1957	83rd 84th	Elected in 1952. Reelected in 1954. Retired.	
David S. Dennison (Warren)	Republican	January 3, 1957 – January 3, 1959	85th	Elected in 1956. Lost reelection.	
Robert E. Cook (Ravenna)	Democratic	January 3, 1959 – January 3, 1963	86th 87th	Elected in 1958. Reelected in 1960. Lost reelection.	
Oliver P. Bolton (Mentor)	Republican	January 3, 1963 – January 3, 1965	88th	Elected in 1962. Redistricted to the at-large district and lost reelection.	
J. William Stanton (Painesville)	Republican	January 3, 1965 – January 3, 1983	89th 90th 91st 92nd 93rd 94th 95th 96th 97th	Elected in 1964. Reelected in 1966. Reelected in 1968. Reelected in 1970. Reelected in 1972. Reelected in 1974. Reelected in 1976. Reelected in 1978. Reelected in 1980. Retired.	
Dennis E. Eckart (Mentor)	Democratic	January 3, 1983 – January 3, 1993	98th 99th 100th 101st 102nd	Redistricted from the 22nd district and reelected in 1982. Reelected in 1984. Reelected in 1986. Reelected in 1988. Reelected in 1990. Redistricted to the 19th district and retired.	
Louis Stokes (Shaker Heights)	Democratic	January 3, 1993 – January 3, 1999	103rd 104th 105th	Redistricted from the 21st district and reelected in 1992. Reelected in 1994. Reelected in 1996. Retired.	
Stephanie Tubbs Jones (Cleveland)	Democratic	January 3, 1999 – August 20, 2008	106th 107th 108th 109th 110th	Elected in 1998. Reelected in 2000. Reelected in 2002. Reelected in 2004. Reelected in 2006. Ran for re-election, but died.	
Stephanie Tubbs Jones (Cleveland)	Democratic	January 3, 1999 – August 20, 2008	106th 107th 108th 109th 110th	Elected in 1998. Reelected in 2000. Reelected in 2002. Reelected in 2004. Reelected in 2006. Ran for re-election, but died.	2003–2013
Vacant		August 20, 2008 – November 18, 2008	110th		2003–2013
Marcia Fudge (Warrensville Heights)	Democratic	November 18, 2008 – March 10, 2021	110th 111th 112th 113th 114th 115th 116th 117th	Elected to finish Jones's term. Elected to full term in 2008. Reelected in 2010. Reelected in 2012. Reelected in 2014. Reelected in 2016. Reelected in 2018. Reelected in 2020. Resigned to become HUD Secretary.	2003–2013
Marcia Fudge (Warrensville Heights)	Democratic	November 18, 2008 – March 10, 2021	110th 111th 112th 113th 114th 115th 116th 117th	Elected to finish Jones's term. Elected to full term in 2008. Reelected in 2010. Reelected in 2012. Reelected in 2014. Reelected in 2016. Reelected in 2018. Reelected in 2020. Resigned to become HUD Secretary.	2013–2023
Vacant		March 10, 2021 – November 4, 2021	117th		2013–2023
Shontel Brown (Warrensville Heights)	Democratic	November 4, 2021 – present	117th 118th 119th	Elected to finish Fudge's term. Re-elected in 2022. Re-elected in 2024. Re-elected in 2026.	2013–2023
Shontel Brown (Warrensville Heights)	Democratic	November 4, 2021 – present	117th 118th 119th	Elected to finish Fudge's term. Re-elected in 2022. Re-elected in 2024. Re-elected in 2026.	2023–2027

== Election results ==
This is an incomplete list of historic election results.

Year	Democratic	Republican	Other
1920	Mell G. Underwood Sr.: 31,359	√ Edwin D. Ricketts (incumbent): 33,524	
1922	√ Mell G. Underwood Sr.: 29,058	Edwin D. Ricketts (incumbent): 27,162	
1924	√ Mell G. Underwood Sr. (incumbent): 35,696	Edwin D. Ricketts: 24,270	
1926	√ Mell G. Underwood Sr. (incumbent): 29,950	Walter S. Barrett: 18,300	
1928	√ Mell G. Underwood Sr. (incumbent): 34,257	Edwin D. Ricketts: 30,574	
1930	√ Mell G. Underwood Sr. (incumbent): 37,887	Ned Thacher: 21,339	
1932	√ Mell G. Underwood Sr. (incumbent): 44,380	David J. Lewis: 26,075	
1934	√ Mell G. Underwood Sr. (incumbent): 36,020	Renick W. Dunlap: 26,723	
1936	√ Harold K. Claypool (incumbent): 41,773	L. P. Mooney: 33,249	
1938	√ Harold K. Claypool (incumbent): 33,764	Tom P. White: 31,004	
1940	√ Harold K. Claypool (incumbent): 43,548	Ray W. Davis: 37,398	
1942	Harold K. Claypool (incumbent): 19,817	√ Walter E. Brehm: 31,385	
1944	Mell G. Underwood Jr.: 33,098	√ Walter E. Brehm (incumbent): 28,263	
1946	Lester S. Reid: 20,543	√ Walter E. Brehm (incumbent): 31,576	
1948	Joseph C. Allen: 32,667	√ Walter E. Brehm (incumbent): 33,796	
1950	Mell G. Underwood Jr.: 29,687	√ Walter E. Brehm (incumbent): 33,648	
1952	Robert J. Kilpatrick: 63,930	√ Oliver P. Bolton: 91,204	
1954	Edward C. Kaley: 39,404	√ Oliver P. Bolton (incumbent): 74,065	
1956	James P. Bennett: 68,831	√ David S. Dennison Jr.: 96,707	
1958	√ Robert E. Cook: 79,468	David S. Dennison Jr. (incumbent): 78,501	
1960	√ Robert E. Cook (incumbent): 104,183	David S. Dennison Jr.: 99,991	
1962	Robert E. Cook (incumbent): 72,936	√ Oliver P. Bolton: 74,573	
1964	C. D. Lambros: 82,728	√ J. William Stanton (incumbent): 102,619	
1966	James F. Henderson: 38,206	√ J. William Stanton (incumbent): 86,273	
1968	Alan D. Wright: 38,063	√ J. William Stanton (incumbent): 116,323	
1970	Ralph Rudd: 42,542	√ J. William Stanton (incumbent): 91,437	
1972	Dennis M. Callahan: 49,891	√ J. William Stanton (incumbent): 106,841	
1974	Michael D. Coffey: 52,017	√ J. William Stanton (incumbent): 79,756	
1976	Thomas R. West Jr.: 47,548	√ J. William Stanton (incumbent): 120,716	
1978	Patrick James Donlin: 37,131	√ J. William Stanton (incumbent): 89,327	Robert Dean Penny: 4,723
1980	Patrick James Donlin: 51,224	√ J. William Stanton (incumbent): 128,507	Harold V. Richard Jr.: 5,742
1982	√ Dennis E. Eckart (incumbent): 93,302	Glen W. Warner: 56,616	Jim Russell (L): 3,324
1984	√ Dennis E. Eckart (incumbent): 133,096	Dean Beagle: 66,278	
1986	√ Dennis E. Eckart (incumbent): 104,740	Margaret R. Mueller: 35,944	Werner J. Lange: 3,884
1988	√ Dennis E. Eckart (incumbent): 124,600	Margaret R. Mueller: 78,028	
1990	√ Dennis E. Eckart (incumbent): 111,923	Margaret R. Mueller: 58,372	
1992	√ Louis Stokes (incumbent): 154,718	Beryl E. Rothschild: 43,866	Edward Gudenas: 19,773; Gerald Henley: 5,267
1994	√ Louis Stokes (incumbent): 114,220	James J. Sykora: 33,705	
1996	√ Louis Stokes (incumbent): 153,546	James J. Sykora: 28,821	Sonja K. Glavina (N): 6,665
1998	√ Stephanie Tubbs Jones: 115,226	James D. Hereford: 18,592	Jean Murrell Capers: 9,477
2000	√ Stephanie Tubbs Jones (incumbent): 164,134	James J. Sykora: 21,630	Joel C. Turner (L): 4,230; Sonja K. Glavina (N): 3,525
2002	√ Stephanie Tubbs Jones (incumbent): 116,590	Patrick A. Pappano: 36,146	
2004	√ Stephanie Tubbs Jones (incumbent): 222,371	(Unopposed)	
2006	√ Stephanie Tubbs Jones (incumbent): 146,799	Lindsey N. String: 29,125	
2008	√ Marcia Fudge: 8,597	(Unopposed)	
2008	√ Marcia Fudge: 212,485	Thomas Pekarek: 36,705	Eric Johnson: 23; Craig Willis: 144
2010	√ Marcia Fudge (incumbent): 130,962	Thomas Pekarek: 27,872	
2012	√ Marcia Fudge (incumbent): 258,378	(Unopposed)	
2014	√ Marcia Fudge (incumbent): 132,396	Mark Zetzer: 34,769	
2016	√ Marcia Fudge (incumbent): 242,917	Beverly Goldstein: 59,769	
2018	√ Marcia Fudge (incumbent): 206,138	Beverly Goldstein: 44,486	
2020	√ Marcia Fudge (incumbent): 242,098	Laverne Gore: 60,323	
2021 (special)	√ Shontel Brown (incumbent): 81,636	Laverne Gore: 21,929	
2022	√ Shontel Brown (incumbent): 167,722	Eric Brewer: 47,988	
2024	√ Shontel Brown (incumbent): 236,883	Alan Rapoport: 59,394	

== See also ==
- Ohio's congressional districts
- List of United States congressional districts
