= William H. Enochs =

American politician

William H. Enoch’s
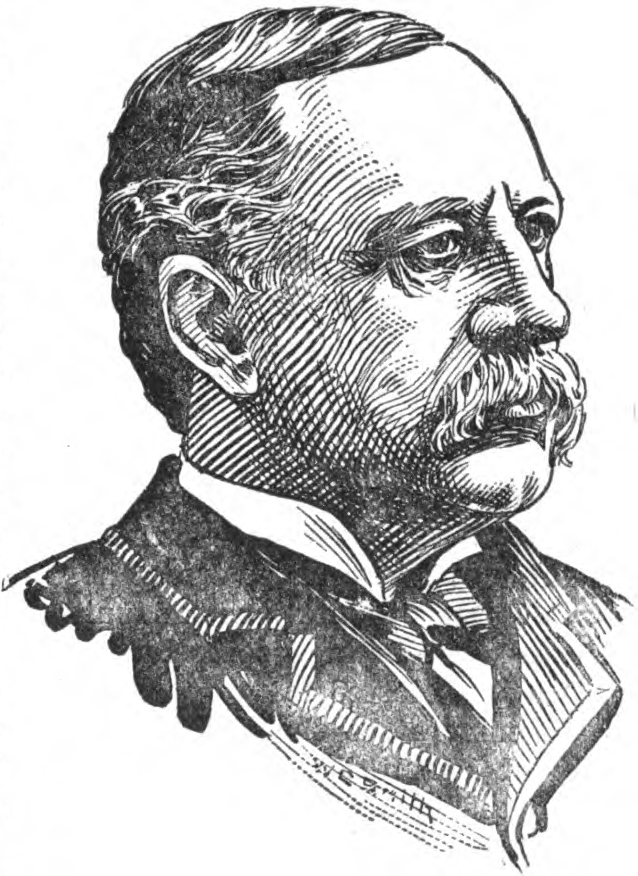

Member of the U.S. House of Representatives from Ohio
- In office March 4, 1891 – July 13, 1893
- Preceded by: Jacob J. Pugsley
- Succeeded by: Hezekiah S. Bundy
- Constituency: 12th district (1891-1893); 10th district (1893)

Member of the Ohio House of Representatives from the Lawrence County, Ohio district
- In office January 3, 1870 – December 31, 1871
- Preceded by: Ralph Leete
- Succeeded by: Henry Berkstresser

Personal details
- Born: William Henry Enochs; March 29, 1842 Middleburg, Ohio, US
- Died: July 13, 1893 (aged 51) Ironton, Ohio, US
- Resting place: Arlington National Cemetery
- Party: Republican
- Spouse: Annis Hamilton Enochs
- Education: Ohio University; Cincinnati Law School

Military service
- Allegiance: United States of America
- Branch/service: United States Army; Union Army
- Rank: Colonel; Bvt. Brigadier General
- Unit: 22nd Ohio Infantry
- Commands: 1st West Virginia Infantry

William Henry Enochs (March 29, 1842 – July 13, 1893) was an American lawyer, Civil War veteran, and politician who served one term as a U.S. representative from Ohio from 1891 to 1893.

== Biography ==
Born near Middleburg, Ohio, Enochs attended the common schools and Ohio University at Athens.

=== Civil War ===
When the American Civil War began he enlisted as a private in Company B, 22nd Ohio Infantry, April 17, 1861. Later he served as colonel of the 1st West Virginia Infantry and was brevetted brigadier general of Volunteers March 13, 1865.

=== Early career ===
After the war ended Enochs studied at the Cincinnati Law School, graduating in 1866. He was admitted to the bar and practiced law in Ironton, Ohio. He also became a member of the State house of representatives in 1870 and 1871.

=== Congress ===
Enochs was elected as a Republican to the Fifty-second and Fifty-third Congresses and served from March 4, 1891, until his death.

=== Death and burial ===
He died in Ironton, Ohio, July 13, 1893, and was interred in Arlington National Cemetery with his wife Annis Hamilton Enochs.

== See also ==
- List of members of the United States Congress who died in office (1790–1899)

== Sources ==
- United States Congress. "William H. Enochs (id: E000193)". Biographical Directory of the United States Congress.

U.S. House of Representatives
Preceded by Jacob J. Pugsley	Member of the U.S. House of Representatives from Ohio's 12th congressional district March 4, 1891-March 3, 1893	Succeeded by Joseph H. Outhwaite
Preceded by Robert E. Doan	Member of the U.S. House of Representatives from Ohio's 10th congressional district March 4, 1893–July 13, 1893	Succeeded by Hezekiah S. Bundy
