= Robert E. Doan =

American politician

Robert E. Dian

Member of the U.S. House of Representatives from Ohio's 10th district
- In office March 4, 1891 – March 3, 1893
- Preceded by: William E. Haynes
- Succeeded by: William H. Enochs

Personal details
- Born: Robert Eachus Doan; July 23, 1831 Wilmington, Ohio, U.S.
- Died: February 24, 1919 (aged 87) Wilmington, Ohio, U.S.
- Resting place: Sugar Grove Cemetery
- Party: Republican
- Education: Cincinnati Law School

Robert Eachus Doan (July 23, 1831 – February 24, 1919) was an American lawyer, newspaperman, and politician who served one term as a U.S. representative from Ohio for one term from 1891 to 1893.

== Biography ==
Born near Wilmington, Ohio, Doan attended common schools there and completed an academic course. He taught for three years in southern Ohio. He graduated from the Cincinnati Law School in 1857 and was admitted to the bar that same year, commencing practice in Wilmington, Ohio.

Doan was editor of the Wilmington Watchman in 1859 and 1860. He served as prosecuting attorney of Clinton County in 1862.

=== Congress ===
Doan was elected as a Republican to the Fifty-second Congress (March 4, 1891 – March 3, 1893). After his unsuccessful candidacy for renomination in 1892 he resumed the practice of law in Washington, D.C.

=== Death and burial ===
Doan died in Wilmington, Ohio on February 24, 1919. His remains are interred at the Sugar Grove Cemetery.

== Sources ==
- United States Congress. "Robert E. Doan (id: D000379)". Biographical Directory of the United States Congress.

U.S. House of Representatives
Preceded by William E. Haynes	Member of the U.S. House of Representatives from Ohio's 10th congressional district March 4, 1891–March 3, 1893	Succeeded by William H. Enochs
