= Jacob J. Pugsley =

American politician

Jacob Joseph Pugsley
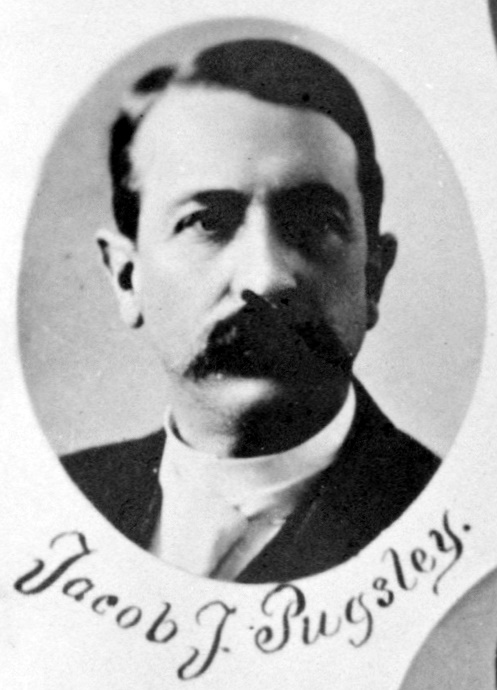

Member of the U.S. House of Representatives from Ohio's 12th district
- In office March 4, 1887 – March 3, 1891
- Preceded by: Albert C. Thompson
- Succeeded by: William H. Enochs

Member of the Ohio House of Representatives from Highland County
- In office January 4, 1886 – March 3, 1887
- Preceded by: William H. Reed
- Succeeded by: D. M. Massie

Member of the Ohio Senate from the 6th district
- In office January 4, 1880 – January 6, 1884
- Preceded by: Henry C. Dawson
- Succeeded by: David M. Barrett

Personal details
- Born: January 25, 1838 Dutchess County, New York, US
- Died: February 5, 1920 (aged 82) Hillsboro, Ohio, US
- Resting place: Hillsboro Cemetery
- Party: Republican
- Education: Miami University

Jacob Joseph Pugsley (January 25, 1838 – February 5, 1920) was an American lawyer and politician who served two terms as a U.S. representative from Ohio from 1887 to 1891.

== Biography ==
Born in Dutchess County, New York, Pugsley moved to Ohio with his parents in 1839. He graduated from Miami University, Oxford, Ohio. He studied law. He was admitted to the bar and commenced practice in Dayton, Ohio. He moved to Hillsboro, Ohio, and continued the practice of law.

In 1866, he married Cornelia Dabney Price. They had a daughter, Nannie Price Pugsley.

=== Political career ===
He served as a member of the State house of representatives 1880–1883. He served in the Ohio Senate in 1886 and 1887.

Pugsley was elected as a Republican to the Fiftieth and Fifty-first Congresses (March 4, 1887 – March 3, 1891). He was not a candidate for renomination in 1890.

=== Death ===
He died in Hillsboro, Ohio on February 5, 1920. He was interred in Hillsboro Cemetery.

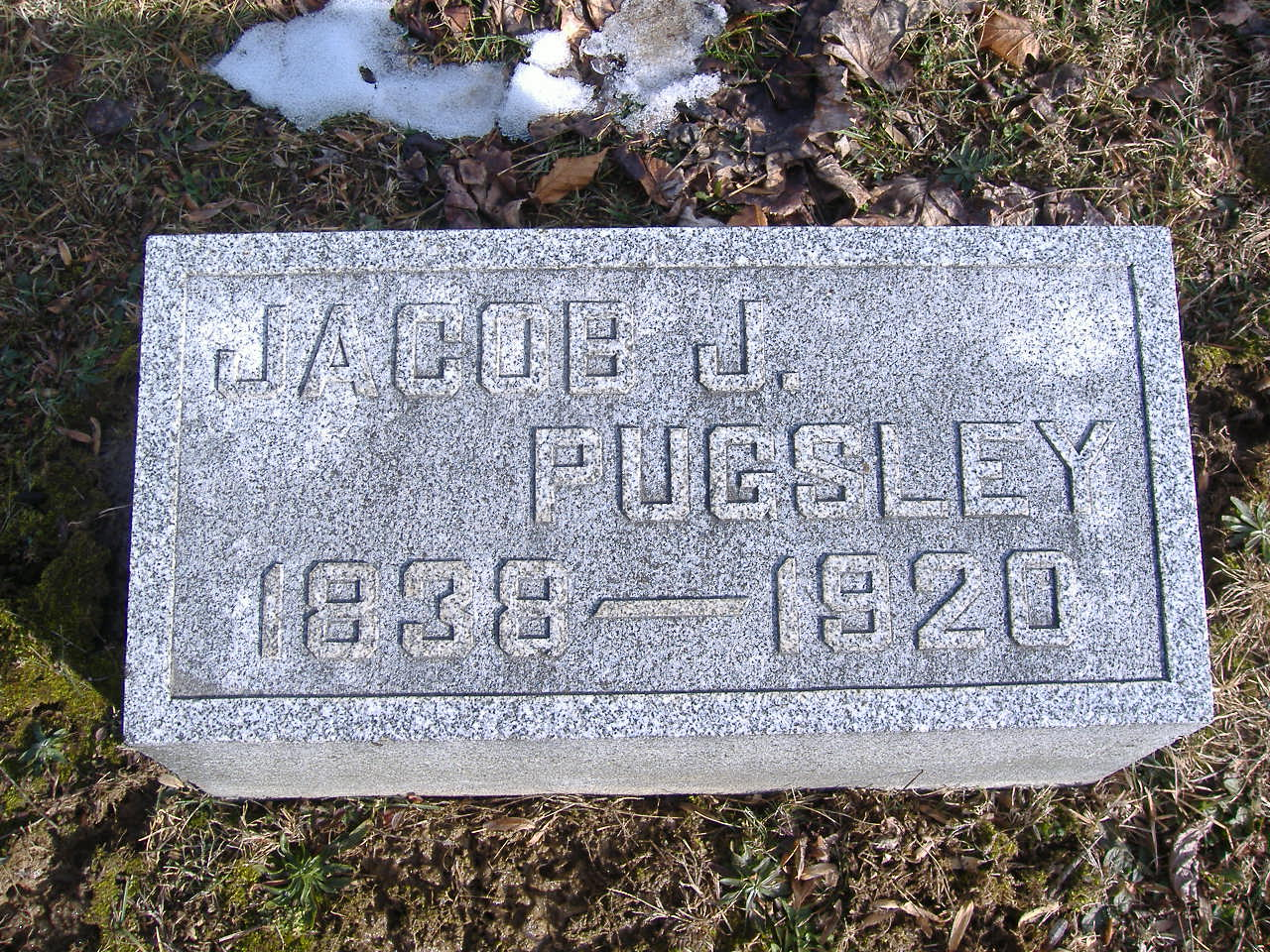
Gravestone of Jacob J. Pugsley at Hillsboro Cemetery in Hillsboro, Ohio.

== Sources ==
- United States Congress. "Jacob J. Pugsley (id: P000566)". Biographical Directory of the United States Congress.

U.S. House of Representatives
Preceded by Albert C. Thompson	United States Representative from Ohio's 12th congressional district March 4, 1887–March 3, 1893	Succeeded by William H. Enochs
Ohio House of Representatives
Preceded by Henry C. Dawson	Representative from Highland County; January 4, 1880-January 6, 1884	Succeeded by David M. Barrett
Ohio Senate
Preceded by William H. Reed	Senator from 6th District; January 4, 1886-March 3, 1887	Succeeded by D. M. Massie
