= Dennis E. Eckart =

American lawyer and politician

Dennis Eckart
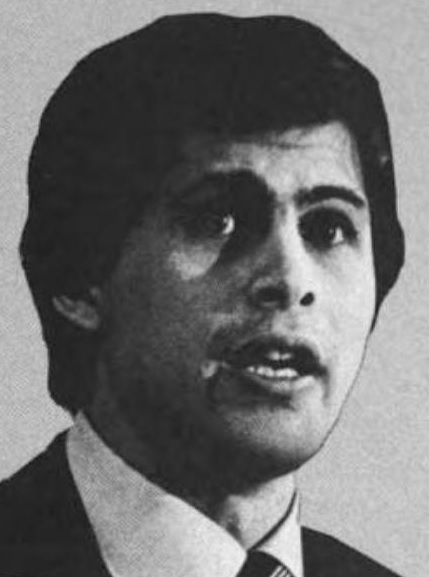

Member of the U.S. House of Representatives from Ohio
- In office January 3, 1981 – January 3, 1993
- Preceded by: Charles A. Vanik
- Succeeded by: Eric Fingerhut (redistricted)
- Constituency: 22nd district (1981–1983); 11th district (1983–1993)

Member of the Ohio House of Representatives from the 18th district
- In office January 3, 1975 – December 31, 1980
- Preceded by: John McCormack
- Succeeded by: Ron Suster

Personal details
- Born: Dennis Edward Eckart; April 6, 1950 (age 76) Cleveland, Ohio, U.S.
- Party: Democratic
- Education: Xavier University (BA); Cleveland State University (LLB)

Dennis Edward Eckart (born April 6, 1950) is an American lawyer and politician who is a former member of the United States House of Representatives. Eckart, a member of the Democratic Party, represented Ohio's 11th congressional district from 1983 to 1993, and Ohio's 22nd congressional district from 1981 to 1983. Before being elected to Congress, Eckart served in the Ohio House of Representatives from 1975 to 1980.

== Early life and career ==
Born into a Roman Catholic family in Cleveland, Ohio, with two brothers Gary and Edward, Dennis Eckart attended St Joseph High School (now VASJ) and Xavier University, receiving his Bachelor of Arts in 1971. He went on to earn a Bachelor of Laws from the Cleveland State University College of Law in 1974, and was admitted to the Ohio bar in 1974. Eckart began his law career practicing in Cleveland and served as the assistant prosecutor in the Lake County, Ohio prosecuting attorney's office. In 1974, he won a seat in the Ohio House of Representatives, where he served three terms from 1975 until 1980.

From 1978 until 1982 he served as a vice-president of the Slovene National Benefit Society.

== United States House of Representatives ==
In 1980, Eckart ran for the U.S. House to replace the vacant seat from retiring 13-term Congressman Charles Vanik. Eckart ran in Ohio's 11th congressional district, defeating State Senator Tim McCormack and State Representative Anthony O. Calabrese, Jr. with 40% of the vote in the Democratic primary. He went on to defeat Republican opponent Joseph Nahra with 55% of the vote in the general election. After the 1980 census, Eckart's district was redrawn, moving him to Ohio's 22nd congressional district. The one-term Congressman defeated State Representative Marcus Roberto in the Democratic primary and Republican Glen W. Warner in the general election.

Eckart served on the House Committee on Energy and Commerce, the House Committee on Education and the Workforce, and the House Committee on Small Business, where he served as Chairman of the Subcommittee for Antitrust, Deregulation and Ecology.

During his tenure in the House, Eckart supported improving standards on environmental protection. He sponsored the Safe Drinking Water Act Amendments of 1983, a bill aimed to improve enforcement and greater protection for underground sources of drinking water. He also sponsored the Great Lakes Emergency Shoreline Protection Act, which would have started a federal guaranteed-loan program to provide for the protection from shoreline erosion of the Great Lakes. He also sponsored the Price-Anderson Amendments Act of 1987, amending the Atomic Energy Act of 1954 to provide for unlimited liability in the event of an accident at a nuclear power plant, and the failed House Joint Resolution 617, establishing a balanced budget amendment the Constitution. Eckart gained notoriety for his portrayal of Dan Quayle in debate preparation with Lloyd Bentsen for the 1988 vice presidential debate.

Eckart was a noted opponent of the Superconducting Super Collider, sponsoring a 1992 amendment in the House to defund the project.

After the 1990 census, with an overall decline in Ohio's population and redistricting, Eckart's district was distributed to the 13th, 14th, 17th and 19th districts. He then decided not to run for reelection in the updated districts and was succeeded by Congressman Eric Fingerhut.

== Post congressional career ==
After his term in Congress, Eckart worked in the American Bar Association's Congressional Process Committee, and was also on the board of the American Institute of Certified Public Accountants. He also served as chair of the United States Delegation to the Conference on Security and Cooperation in Europe.

From 2000 to 2003 he served as president and CEO of the Greater Cleveland Growth Association. He practiced law as a partner of BakerHostetler, representing "a variety of clients before Congress, the Executive Branch, federal and state agencies and state legislatures" (see )until 2006, when he opened North Shore Associates, a consulting firm. Eckart's North Shore work includes many of his previous clients as well as some real estate development work.

Americans for Democratic Action lists his liberal quotient as 80% for the entirety of his service. In 2002 the National Center for Responsible Gaming, or NCRG, elected him as chairman. This is an organization that does scientific research on pathological gambling and youth gambling. In 2007 then Governor Ted Strickland appointed Eckart to the board of trustees for Kent State University.

== Personal life ==
Eckart and his wife Sandy, have one adult son, Eddy. They reside in Concord, Ohio. Eckart is a Roman Catholic.

U.S. House of Representatives
Preceded by Charles A. Vanik	Member of the U.S. House of Representatives from Ohio's 22nd congressional district 1981–1983	Constituency abolished
Preceded by J. William Stanton	Member of the U.S. House of Representatives from Ohio's 11th congressional district 1983–1993	Succeeded by Louis Stokes
U.S. order of precedence (ceremonial)
Preceded by Phil Roe as Former U.S. Representative	Order of precedence of the United States as Former U.S. Representative	Succeeded by Bob McEwen as Former U.S. Representative
