= Walter E. Brehm =

American politician (1892–1971)

Walter Brehm
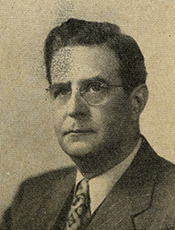

Member of the U.S. House of Representatives from Ohio's 11th district
- In office January 3, 1943 – January 3, 1953
- Preceded by: Harold K. Claypool
- Succeeded by: Oliver P. Bolton

Member of the Ohio House of Representatives
- In office 1938–1942

Personal details
- Born: Walter Ellsworth Brehm; May 25, 1892 Somerset, Ohio, U.S.
- Died: August 24, 1971 (aged 79) Columbus, Ohio, U.S.
- Party: Republican
- Education: Boston University; Ohio Wesleyan University; Ohio State University (DMD)

Walter Ellsworth Brehm (May 25, 1892 – August 24, 1971) was a U.S. representative from Ohio.

== Biography ==
Born in Somerset, Ohio, Brehm attended the public schools and worked in steel mills, rubber factories, and oil fields after graduation from high school. He graduated from the Ohio State University College of Dentistry in Columbus in 1917 and attended Boston University, and Ohio Wesleyan University at Delaware, Ohio.

Brehm was a private in Company D, Seventh Regiment, Ohio Infantry from 1908 to 1913.

He engaged in the practice of dentistry in Logan, Ohio, from 1921 to 1942.

== Politics ==
He served as the Treasurer of the Republican Executive Committee of Hocking County, Logan City Council from 1936 to 1938 and served then in the State House of Representatives 1938–1942.

Brehm was elected as a Republican to the Seventy-eighth and to the four succeeding Congresses (January 3, 1943 – January 3, 1953).

== Conviction ==
On December 20, 1950, Brehm was indicted by a federal grand jury in Washington, D.C., on charges that he accepted campaign contributions of $1000 from his clerk, Emma Craven, and from another clerk, Clara Soliday. On April 30, 1951, Brehm was convicted of taking the contribution from Craven, and acquitted of taking money from Soliday. On June 11, 1951, Federal Judge Burnita Shelton Matthews sentenced Brehm to five to fifteen months in prison, and fined him $5000. She suspended the sentence, saying that Brehm had led an exemplary life before the incident. He never served any time in prison.

== Later years ==
Brehm was not a candidate for reelection in 1952 to the Eighty-third Congress. He resumed the practice of dentistry and affiliated with a dental supply company after retirement from active practice. He resided in Columbus, Ohio, until his death there August 24, 1971.

== See also ==
- List of American federal politicians convicted of crimes
- List of federal political scandals in the United States

== Notes ==
U.S. House of Representatives
Preceded by Harold K. Claypool	Member of the U.S. House of Representatives from Ohio's 11th congressional district 1943–1953	Succeeded by Oliver P. Bolton
