= Robert Reasoner Nevin =

American judge (1875–1952)

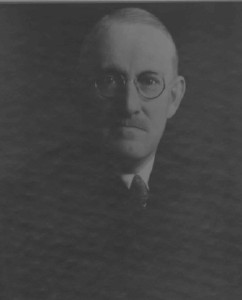

Chief Judge of the United States District Court for the Southern District of Ohio
- In office 1948–1952
- Preceded by: Office established
- Succeeded by: Mell G. Underwood

Judge of the United States District Court for the Southern District of Ohio
- In office January 21, 1929 – December 31, 1952
- Appointed by: Calvin Coolidge
- Preceded by: Smith Hickenlooper
- Succeeded by: Lester LeFevre Cecil

Personal details
- Born: Robert Reasoner Nevin; August 2, 1875 Dayton, Ohio, U.S.
- Died: December 31, 1952 (aged 77)
- Education: Ohio State University; Cincinnati Law School read law

Robert Reasoner Nevin (August 2, 1875 – December 31, 1952) was a United States district judge of the United States District Court for the Southern District of Ohio.

== Education and career ==
Born in Dayton, Ohio, Nevin attended Ohio State University and Cincinnati Law School (now the University of Cincinnati College of Law), but read law to enter the bar in 1898. He served as a lieutenant in the United States Army during the Spanish–American War, and was in private practice in Dayton from 1898 to 1903. He was prosecuting attorney of Montgomery County, Ohio from 1906 to 1919.

== Federal judicial service ==
On January 5, 1929, Nevin was nominated by President Calvin Coolidge to a seat on the United States District Court for the Southern District of Ohio vacated by Judge Smith Hickenlooper. Nevin was confirmed by the United States Senate on January 21, 1929, and received his commission the same day. He served as Chief Judge from 1948 until his death on December 31, 1952.

== Sources ==
Legal offices
Preceded by Smith Hickenlooper	Judge of the United States District Court for the Southern District of Ohio; 1929–1952	Succeeded by Lester LeFevre Cecil
Preceded by Office established	Chief Judge of the United States District Court for the Southern District of Ohio; 1948–1952	Succeeded by Mell G. Underwood
