= Oinville-sous-Auneau =

- Commune
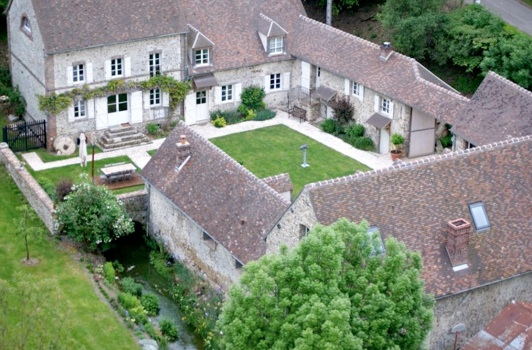
- Mill at Lonceux
- Location of Oinville-sous-Auneau
- Location within France Location within Centre-Val de Loire
- Coordinates: 48°27′59″N 1°43′42″E
- Country: France
- Region: Centre-Val de Loire
- Department: Eure-et-Loir
- Arrondissement: Chartres
- Canton: Auneau
- Intercommunality: CA Chartres Métropole

Government
  - Mayor (2020–2026): Christophe Lethuillier
- Area^{1}: 10.38 km^{2} (4.01 sq mi)
- Elevation: 155 m (509 ft)
- Highest elevation: 160 m (520 ft)
- Lowest elevation: 120 m (390 ft)
- Population (2023): 313
  - Density: 30.2/km^{2} (78.1/sq mi)
- Time zone: UTC+01:00 (CET)
  - Summer (DST): UTC+02:00 (CEST)
- INSEE/Postal code: 28285 /28700
- ^{1} French Land Register data, which excludes lakes, ponds, glaciers > 1 km^{2} (0.386 sq mi or 247 acres) and river estuaries.

Oinville-sous-Auneau (French pronunciation: [wɛ̃vil su.z‿ono], literally Oinville under Auneau) is a commune in the Eure-et-Loir department in northern France.

== Population ==
Historical population
Year	Pop.	±% p.a.
1968	161	—
1975	162	+0.09%
1982	188	+2.15%
1990	256	+3.93%
1999	279	+0.96%
2007	313	+1.45%
2012	341	+1.73%
2017	345	+0.23%
2023	313	−1.61%
Source: INSEE

== See also ==
- Communes of the Eure-et-Loir department
