= United States v. Stickrath =

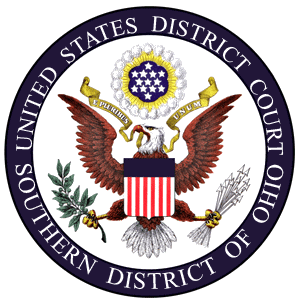
- Court: United States District Court for the Southern District of Ohio
- Full case name: United States v. Pemberton W. Stickrath
- Decided: June 22, 1917
- Docket nos.: No. 932
- Prosecution: Stuart R. Bolin

Court membership
- Judge sitting: John Elbert Sater

United States v. Stickrath, 242 F. 151 (S.D. Ohio 1917), is a case that was decided by the United States District Court for the Southern District of Ohio, in which it was ruled that threatening the president of the United States was akin to treason. It was also held that stating the president "ought" to be killed was more serious than saying that the president "should" be killed.
