= Edmund Sargus =

Edmund Sargus may refer to:

- Edmund A. Sargus (1911–1967), Ohio state senator
- Edmund A. Sargus Jr. (born 1953), his son, U.S. federal judge
