= Justice Hough =

Justice Hough may refer to:

- Benson W. Hough (1875–1935), associate justice of the Supreme Court of Ohio
- Warwick Hough (1836–1915), associate justice and chief justice of the Supreme Court of Missouri

== See also ==
- Judge Hough (disambiguation)
