= Judge Hough =

Judge Hough may refer to:

- Benson W. Hough (1875–1935), judge of the United States District Court for the Southern District of Ohio
- Charles Merrill Hough (1858–1927), judge of the United States Court of Appeals for the Second Circuit

== See also ==
- Justice Hough (disambiguation)
