= David M. DeVillers =

American attorney (born 1966)

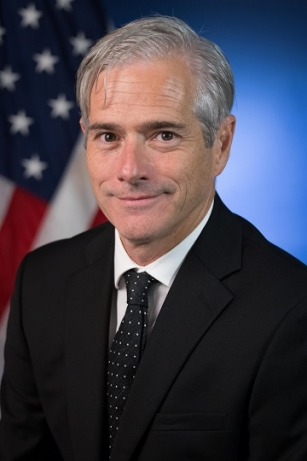

United States Attorney for the Southern District of Ohio
- In office November 1, 2019 – February 28, 2021
- President: Donald Trump; Joe Biden
- Preceded by: Carter M. Stewart
- Succeeded by: Vipal J. Patel (acting); Kenneth L. Parker

Personal details
- Born: c. 1966 (age 59–60)
- Education: State University of New York at Oswego (BA); Capital University (JD)

David Michael DeVillers (born c. 1966) is an American lawyer who served as the United States attorney for the Southern District of Ohio from 2019 to 2021. Before his nomination, he was an Assistant United States Attorney for the same district.

DeVillers served as director of the Franklin County Prosecutor's Office's Organized Crime/Gang Unit in Columbus before joining the Department of Justice. In September 2019, President Donald Trump nominated him as United States Attorney for the Southern District of Ohio. He was confirmed by the United States Senate in late October and sworn into office on November 1, 2019.

== Education ==
DeVillers received his Bachelor of Arts degree from the State University of New York at Oswego and his Juris Doctor from Capital University Law School.

== Career ==
DeVillers began his legal career in Franklin County as assistant county prosecutor for Ron O'Brien. He has twice served as a legal advisor with the Department of Justice's Office of Overseas Prosecutorial Development Assistance and Training. He later became an assistant United States attorney in the United States Attorney's Office for the Southern District of Ohio. While serving as an Assistant U.S. Attorney, DeVillers led numerous organized crime task forces involving the Federal Bureau of Investigation, Bureau of Alcohol, Tobacco, Firearms and Explosives, Drug Enforcement Administration, and Internal Revenue Service.

=== U.S. Attorney ===
On August 14, 2019, President Trump announced that he would nominate DeVillers as U.S. attorney for the United States District Court for the Southern District of Ohio. On September 9, his nomination was sent to the Senate. On October 28, the Senate confirmed his nomination by voice vote. In his new role, DeVillers said his priorities were to clamp down on gang activity, prevent illegal gun sales, and disrupt illegal drug trafficking.

On July 21, 2020, DeVillers announced the FBI's arrest of Speaker of the Ohio House of Representatives Larry Householder and four others on federal RICO charges in connection with a $60 million bribery case that involved the bailout of FirstEnergy's two nuclear plants in Ohio, Davis–Besse and Perry. DeVillers called it "likely the largest bribery scheme ever perpetrated against the state of Ohio".

On February 8, 2021, he along with 55 other Trump-era attorneys were asked to resign. DeVillers announced his resignation February 9, effective February 28, 2021, at which point the Office’s second-in-command, First Assistant United States Attorney Vipal J. Patel, took over as United States Attorney on an acting basis pursuant to the Federal Vacancies Reform Act of 1998.
