= Sarah D. Morrison =

American judge (born 1970)

Sarah Morrison
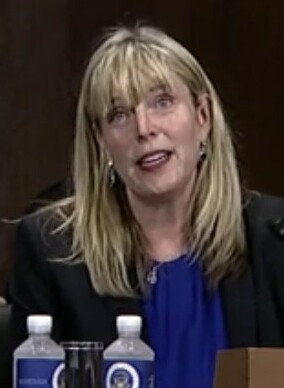

Chief Judge of the United States District Court for the Southern District of Ohio
- Incumbent
- Assumed office September 7, 2024
- Preceded by: Algenon L. Marbley

Judge of the United States District Court for the Southern District of Ohio
- Incumbent
- Assumed office June 14, 2019
- Appointed by: Donald Trump
- Preceded by: Gregory L. Frost

Personal details
- Born: Sarah Elizabeth Daggett; 1970 (age 55–56) Lufkin, Texas, U.S.
- Education: Ohio State University (BA); Capital University (JD)

Sarah Elizabeth Daggett Morrison (née Daggett; born 1970) is the chief United States district judge of the United States District Court for the Southern District of Ohio.

== Early life and education ==
Morrison was born in 1970, in Lufkin, Texas. She received her Bachelor of Arts from Ohio State University and her Juris Doctor, magna cum laude, from the Capital University Law School, where she was inducted into the Order of the Curia and served as an associate editor of the Capital University Law Review.

== Career ==
After graduation from law school, Morrison served as a law clerk to Judge John David Holschuh of the United States District Court for the Southern District of Ohio. Before entering state service, she was a partner in the Columbus, Ohio office of Taft Stettinius & Hollister, where she practiced complex civil and commercial litigation. Prior to her appointment as Administrator, she served for four years as the General Counsel and chief ethics officer of the Ohio Bureau of Workers' Compensation. From 2016 to 2019 she served as the Administrator and chief executive officer of the Ohio Bureau of Workers' Compensation, where she oversaw the investment of $25 billion and an agency staff of 1,800.

=== Federal judicial service ===
On April 10, 2018, President Donald Trump announced his intent to nominate Morrison to serve as a United States district judge of the United States District Court for the Southern District of Ohio. On April 12, 2018, her nomination was sent to the Senate. She was nominated to the seat vacated by Judge Gregory L. Frost, who retired on May 2, 2016. On October 10, 2018, a hearing on her nomination was held before the Senate Judiciary Committee.

On January 3, 2019, her nomination was returned to the president under Rule XXXI, Paragraph 6 of the Senate. On January 23, 2019, President Trump announced his intent to renominate Morrison for a federal judgeship. Her nomination was sent to the Senate later that day. On February 7, 2019, her nomination was reported out of committee by a voice vote. On June 10, 2019, the Senate invoked cloture on her nomination by a 89–7 vote. On June 11, 2019, her nomination was confirmed by a 89–7 vote. She received her judicial commission on June 14, 2019. She became the chief judge on September 7, 2024.

Legal offices
Preceded by Gregory L. Frost	Judge of the United States District Court for the Southern District of Ohio; 2019–present	Incumbent
Preceded by Algenon L. Marbley	Chief Judge of the United States District Court for the Southern District of Ohio; 2024–present	Incumbent
