= Michael J. Newman =

American judge (born 1960)

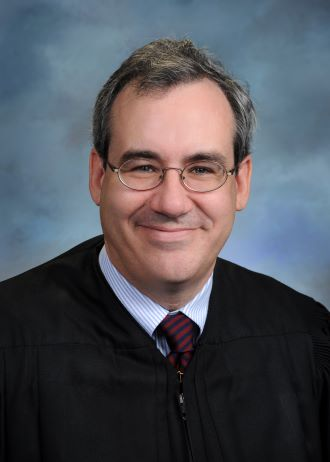

Judge of the United States District Court for the Southern District of Ohio
- Incumbent
- Assumed office November 12, 2020
- Appointed by: Donald Trump
- Preceded by: Michael R. Barrett

Magistrate Judge of the United States District Court for the Southern District of Ohio
- In office July 25, 2011 – November 12, 2020

Personal details
- Born: Michael Jay Newman; 1960 (age 65–66) Somerville, New Jersey, U.S.
- Education: New York University (BFA); American University (JD)

Michael Jay Newman (born 1960) is a United States district judge of the United States District Court for the Southern District of Ohio.

== Early life and education ==
Newman grew up in Hightstown, New Jersey. He received a Bachelor of Fine Arts from New York University and a Juris Doctor, with honors, from the American University's Washington College of Law. Newman has also attended the Advanced Mediation Program at Harvard Law School.

== Career ==
After graduating from law school, Newman served as a law clerk to Magistrate Judge Jack Sherman Jr. of the United States District Court for the Southern District of Ohio, and then to Judge Nathaniel R. Jones of the United States Court of Appeals for the Sixth Circuit.

Newman was a partner at the Cincinnati law firm Dinsmore & Shohl and practiced in the areas of labor & employment, business litigation, ERISA litigation, and appellate litigation. While in private practice, Newman represented clients ranging from individuals to Fortune 500 companies. He chaired the firm's Labor & Employment Appellate Practice Group, created a pro bono appellate program through which firm attorneys argued civil rights and criminal appeals cases in the Sixth Circuit, and served on the firm's diversity committee. Newman was recognized as a Leading Lawyer, an Ohio Super Lawyer, and one of the Best Lawyers in America in Labor & Employment Law.

=== Federal judicial service ===
Newman served as a United States magistrate judge of the United States District Court for the Southern District of Ohio, a position he was appointed to on July 25, 2011 and left in 2020 upon becoming a district judge.

From 2013 to 2014, Newman chaired the Federal Bar Association's national Magistrate Judge Task Force, which was responsible for the special issue of The Federal Lawyer devoted to Magistrate Judges and the FBA's White Paper on the history and role of Magistrate Judges. Newman wrote the introduction to the White Paper. Newman was recognized thereafter by the Federal Magistrate Judges Association for "valuable and dedicated service to all Magistrate Judges" in the United States.

As a magistrate judge, Newman led the effort to create the first Federal Veterans Treatment Court in the Southern District of Ohio, and has served as its presiding judge since the fall of 2015.

On February 26, 2020, President Donald Trump announced his intent to nominate Newman to a seat on the United States District Court for the Southern District of Ohio. On March 3, 2020, his nomination was sent to the Senate. President Trump nominated Newman to the seat vacated by Judge Michael R. Barrett, who assumed senior status on February 15, 2019. A hearing on his nomination before the Senate Judiciary Committee was held on July 29, 2020. On September 17, 2020, his nomination was reported out of committee by a 17–5 vote. On October 22, 2020, the United States Senate invoked cloture on his nomination by a 66–31 vote. His nomination was confirmed later that day by a 67–30 vote. He received his judicial commission on November 10, 2020. He was sworn in to office on November 12, 2020. The swearing-in ceremony took place at the Walter H. Rice Federal Building and United States Courthouse. The oath was administered by Judge Algenon L. Marbley.

== Memberships ==
Newman has been a member of the Federalist Society since 2008.

== Personal life ==
Newman and his wife, Rachel, have triplet daughters.

Legal offices
| Preceded by Michael R. Barrett | Judge of the United States District Court for the Southern District of Ohio; 2020–present | Incumbent |
