= Jeffery P. Hopkins =

American judge (born 1960)

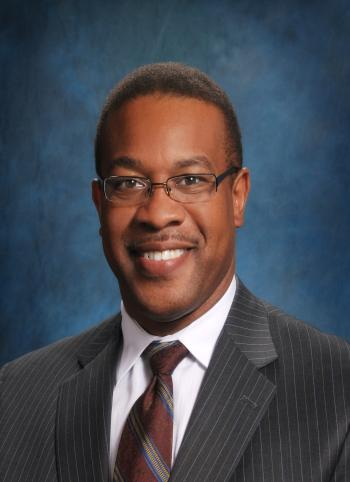

Judge of the United States District Court for the Southern District of Ohio
- Incumbent
- Assumed office December 16, 2022
- Appointed by: Joe Biden
- Preceded by: Timothy Black

Personal details
- Born: Jeffery Paul Hopkins; 1960 (age 65–66) Camilla, Georgia, U.S.
- Education: Bowdoin College (AB); Ohio State University (JD)

Jeffery Paul Hopkins (born 1960) is an American lawyer who is a United States district judge of the United States District Court for the Southern District of Ohio. He previously served as a United States bankruptcy judge of the same court.

== Education ==
Hopkins attended the Middlesex School. He received a Bachelor of Arts from Bowdoin College in 1982 and a Juris Doctor from the Ohio State University Moritz College of Law in 1985.

== Career ==
Hopkins served as a law clerk for Judge Alan Eugene Norris of the Ohio Court of Appeals from 1985 to 1986 and the United States Court of Appeals for the Sixth Circuit from 1986 to 1987. From 1987 to 1990, he was also an associate at Squire, Sanders & Dempsey LLP (now Squire Patton Boggs). From 1990 to 1993, he was an assistant United States attorney for the Southern District of Ohio. Intermittently, from 1998 to 2011, Hopkins was an adjunct professor at the University of Cincinnati College of Law.

=== Bankruptcy court ===
From 1996 to 2022, Hopkins has served as a United States bankruptcy judge of the United States District Court for the Southern District of Ohio. From 2014 to 2022, he served as Chief Judge.

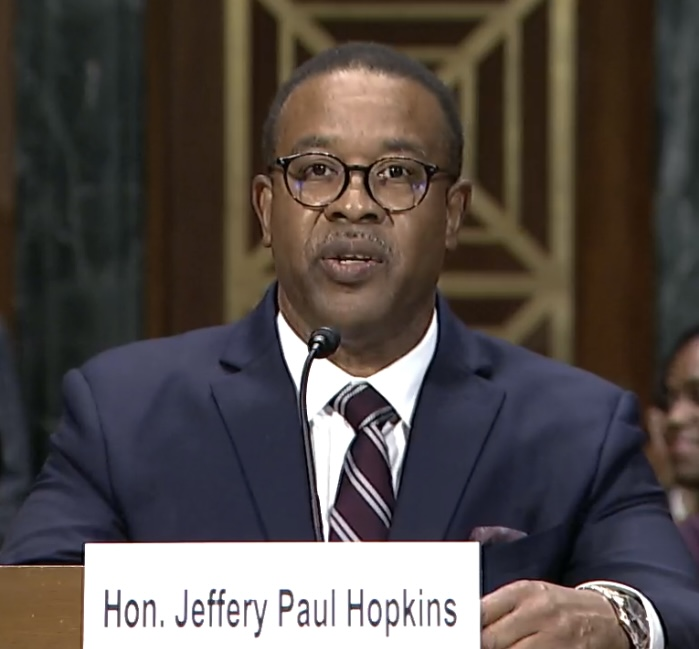
U.S. Senate Judiciary Committee hearing

=== District court ===
On July 29, 2022, President Joe Biden announced his intent to nominate Hopkins to serve as a United States district judge of the United States District Court for the Southern District of Ohio. On August 1, 2022, his nomination was sent to the Senate. President Biden nominated Hopkins to the seat vacated by Judge Timothy Black, who assumed senior status on May 18, 2022. Hopkins was recommended to the president by Senators Sherrod Brown and Rob Portman. On October 12, 2022, a hearing on his nomination was held before the Senate Judiciary Committee. On December 1, 2022, his nomination was reported out of committee by a 16–6 vote. On December 7, 2022, the United States Senate invoked cloture on his nomination by a 60–34 vote. On December 8, 2022, his nomination was confirmed by a 64–32 vote. He received his judicial commission on December 16, 2022.

== Personal life ==
Hopkins and his wife, Michelle, live in Cincinnati. They are the parents of two adult children.

On January 29, 1943, Hopkins' uncle, Robert "Bobby" Hall, was arrested at his home by Claude Screws, the sheriff of Baker County, Georgia. Hall had allegedly stolen a tire, and was alleged to have tried to fight back against Screws and two of his deputies during the arrest. Screws then beat Hall to death. The Supreme Court of the United States, in a 1945 decision, Screws v. United States, authored by William O. Douglas, ruled that the federal government had not shown that Screws had the intention of violating Hall's civil rights when he killed him.

== See also ==
- List of African-American federal judges
- List of African-American jurists

Legal offices
Preceded by Timothy Black	Judge of the United States District Court for the Southern District of Ohio; 2022–present	Incumbent
