= Michael H. Watson =

American judge (born 1956)

Michael Harrison Watson
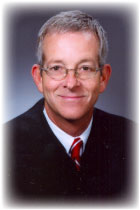

Senior Judge of the United States District Court for the Southern District of Ohio
- Incumbent
- Assumed office November 1, 2025

Judge of the United States District Court for the Southern District of Ohio
- In office September 10, 2004 – November 1, 2025
- Appointed by: George W. Bush
- Preceded by: James L. Graham
- Succeeded by: Matthew R. Byrne

Personal details
- Born: Michael Harrison Watson; November 7, 1956 (age 69) Akron, Ohio, U.S.
- Education: Ohio State University (BA); Capital University Law School (JD)

Michael Harrison Watson (born November 7, 1956) is a senior United States district judge of the United States District Court for the Southern District of Ohio.

== Education and career ==
Watson was born in Akron, Ohio. He received his Bachelor of Arts degree from Ohio State University in 1983 and his Juris Doctor from Capital University Law School in 1987. He was a member of the United States Air Force from 1975 to 1978 and was in the Ohio Air National Guard from 1978 to 1984. He rose to the rank of E5.

Watson was a bailiff/law clerk of the Franklin County Court of Common Pleas from 1983 to 1988. He was in private practice in Ohio from 1988 to 1991 and was chief legal counsel of the Ohio Department of Commerce from 1991 to 1992. He was a deputy chief legal counsel in the Office of the Governor of Ohio from 1992 to 1994 and was chief legal counsel from 1994 to 1995. Watson was a judge to the Franklin County Court of Common Pleas from 1996 to 2003. He was a judge to the Tenth District Ohio Court of Appeal from 2003 to 2004.

=== Federal judicial service ===
President George W. Bush nominated Watson to the United States District Court for the Southern District of Ohio on April 6, 2004, to the seat vacated by Judge James L. Graham. His nomination generated no controversy. He was confirmed by the Senate on September 7, 2004, by a voice vote and he received his commission on September 10, 2004. He assumed senior status on November 1, 2025.

==== Ohio State University abuse scandal lawsuits ====
Since 2018, Watson has presided over the Ohio State University abuse scandal lawsuits, which has stalled in mediation for over 3 years and favored OSU defendants

In September 2021, it was revealed that Judge Watson failed to disclose that his wife has a licensing agreement with the university to sell OSU flags; the judge offered to hear arguments requesting his recusal. Watson is also an adjunct faculty member at OSU, which would typically be a disqualification from presiding over his employer. The plaintiffs and Strauss survivors in these lawsuits are frustrated with the Judge and OSU. However, the Sixth Circuit later ruled that none of these grounds required Judge Watson's recusal. Ohio State appealed to the Supreme Court of the United States; the justices upheld the sixth circuit's ruling.

On February 11, 2026, Watson denied Les Wexner's January motion to quash a subpoena, and ordered him to attend a long-avoided deposition in the case regarding abuses by former Ohio State University staff physician Richard Strauss, who was implicated in the Ohio State University abuse scandal, before committing suicide in 2005.

== Sources ==
Legal offices
Preceded by James L. Graham	Judge of the United States District Court for the Southern District of Ohio; 2004–2025	Succeeded by Matthew R. Byrne
