= Douglas R. Cole =

American judge (born 1964)

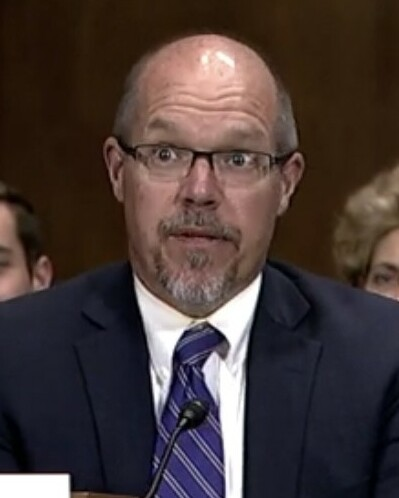

Judge of the United States District Court for the Southern District of Ohio
- Incumbent
- Assumed office December 5, 2019
- Appointed by: Donald Trump
- Preceded by: Susan J. Dlott

5th Solicitor General of Ohio
- In office 2003–2006
- Attorney General: Jim Petro
- Preceded by: David Gormley
- Succeeded by: Bill Marshall

Personal details
- Born: Douglas Russell Cole; 1964 (age 61–62) Janesville, Wisconsin, U.S.
- Party: Republican
- Education: Ripon College (BA); University of Wisconsin (BSEE); University of Chicago (JD)

Douglas Russell Cole (born 1964) is a United States district judge of the United States District Court for the Southern District of Ohio.

== Education ==
Cole earned his Bachelor of Arts from Ripon College and his Bachelor of Engineering, with honors, from the University of Wisconsin. He obtained his Juris Doctor, with high honors, from the University of Chicago Law School.

== Career ==
Upon graduation from law school, Cole served as a law clerk to Judge Frank H. Easterbrook of the United States Court of Appeals for the Seventh Circuit. From 2002 to 2006, he served as Solicitor General of Ohio in the Office of the Ohio Attorney General. In that role, he briefed and argued cases in front of the Supreme Court of the United States, the Ohio Supreme Court, and the United States Court of Appeals for the Sixth Circuit on behalf of the state of Ohio. From 2000 to 2003, Cole was a professor at the Ohio State University Moritz College of Law, where he taught courses in corporations, contracts, and law and economics.

From 2006 to 2019, he was a partner at Organ Cole LLP in Columbus, Ohio, where he represented clients in complex litigation and intellectual property matters.

=== Federal judicial service ===
On May 3, 2019, President Donald Trump announced his intent to nominate Cole to serve as a United States district judge of the United States District Court for the Southern District of Ohio. On May 13, 2019, President Trump nominated Cole to the seat vacated by Judge Susan J. Dlott, who assumed senior status on May 31, 2018. On June 26, 2019, a hearing on his nomination was held before the Senate Judiciary Committee. On July 18, 2019, his nomination was reported out of committee by a 16–6 vote. On December 3, 2019, the United States Senate invoked cloture on his nomination by a 62–29 vote. On December 4, 2019, his nomination was confirmed by a 63–30 vote. He received his judicial commission on December 5, 2019.

Legal offices
Preceded by Susan J. Dlott	Judge of the United States District Court for the Southern District of Ohio; 2019–present	Incumbent
