= George Read Sage =

American judge (1828–1898)

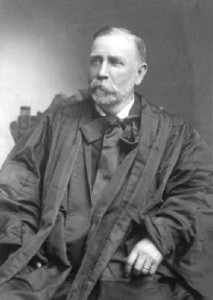

Judge of the United States District Court for the Southern District of Ohio
- In office March 20, 1883 – August 24, 1898
- Appointed by: Chester A. Arthur
- Preceded by: William White
- Succeeded by: Albert C. Thompson

Personal details
- Born: George Read Sage; August 24, 1828 Erie, Pennsylvania, U.S.
- Died: November 19, 1898 (aged 70) Lebanon, Ohio, U.S.
- Education: Denison University; Cincinnati Law School read law

George Read Sage (August 24, 1828 – November 19, 1898) was a United States district judge of the United States District Court for the Southern District of Ohio.

== Education and career ==
Born in Erie, Pennsylvania, Sage graduated from Granville College (now Denison University) in 1849 and attended Cincinnati Law School, but read law to enter the bar in 1852. He was in private practice in Cincinnati, Ohio from 1852 to 1857, and in Lebanon, Ohio from 1857 to 1865. After a brief stint as a prosecuting attorney of Warren County, Ohio, he returned to private practice in Cincinnati from 1867 to 1883.

== Federal judicial service ==
Sage received a recess appointment from President Chester A. Arthur on March 20, 1883, to a seat on the United States District Court for the Southern District of Ohio vacated by William White. He was nominated to the same position by President Arthur on December 18, 1883. He was confirmed by the United States Senate on January 7, 1884, and received his commission the same day. His service terminated on August 24, 1898, due to his retirement.

== Death ==
Sage died on November 19, 1898, in Lebanon.

Legal offices
Preceded by William White	Judge of the United States District Court for the Southern District of Ohio; 1883–1898	Succeeded by Albert C. Thompson
