= Vipal J. Patel =

American attorney (born 1967 or 1968)

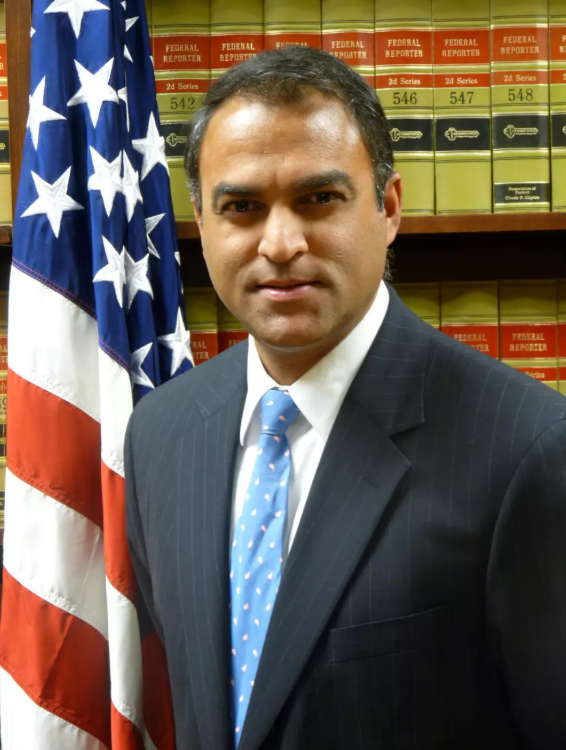

United States Attorney for the Southern District of Ohio
- In office February 28, 2021 – November 23, 2021
- President: Joe Biden
- Preceded by: David M. DeVillers
- Succeeded by: Kenneth L. Parker

Personal details
- Born: 1967 or 1968 (age 58–59)
- Education: Kent State University (BS); George Washington University (JD)

Vipal J. Patel (born 1967 or 1968), is an American lawyer who is the current First Assistant United States Attorney for the Southern District of Ohio, and who previously served as the acting United States attorney for the Southern District of Ohio from February 28, 2021 to November 23, 2021. He became acting attorney when David M. DeVillers resigned from the role. Patel served as Assistant United States Attorney for the district since 2005 (USAO CDCA 2000-2005), and was First Assistant from April 2016 to December 2021, and then again from January 2026 to the present.

== Early life ==
Patel immigrated to the United States with his parents in 1970 and was naturalized in 1981. He founded a soccer club in Dayton, where he lives.

== Career ==
Patel was the lead federal prosecutor in the first ever international terrorism case to go to trial in the Southern District of Ohio, and was also the lead federal prosecutor responding to the August 2019 mass shooting near downtown Dayton, Ohio. Patel has taught law at University of Dayton School of Law since 2008. He worked at an anti-corruption and anti-narcotics position in Afghanistan with DOJ in 2011 as a civilian Rule of Law senior advisor. After leaving the Southern District of Ohio office in 2022, Patel joined the law firm Squire Patton Boggs, where he practiced until returning to the United States Attorney's Office for the Southern District of Ohio in 2026 as its First Assistant U.S. Attorney.
