= List of federal judges appointed by Chester A. Arthur =

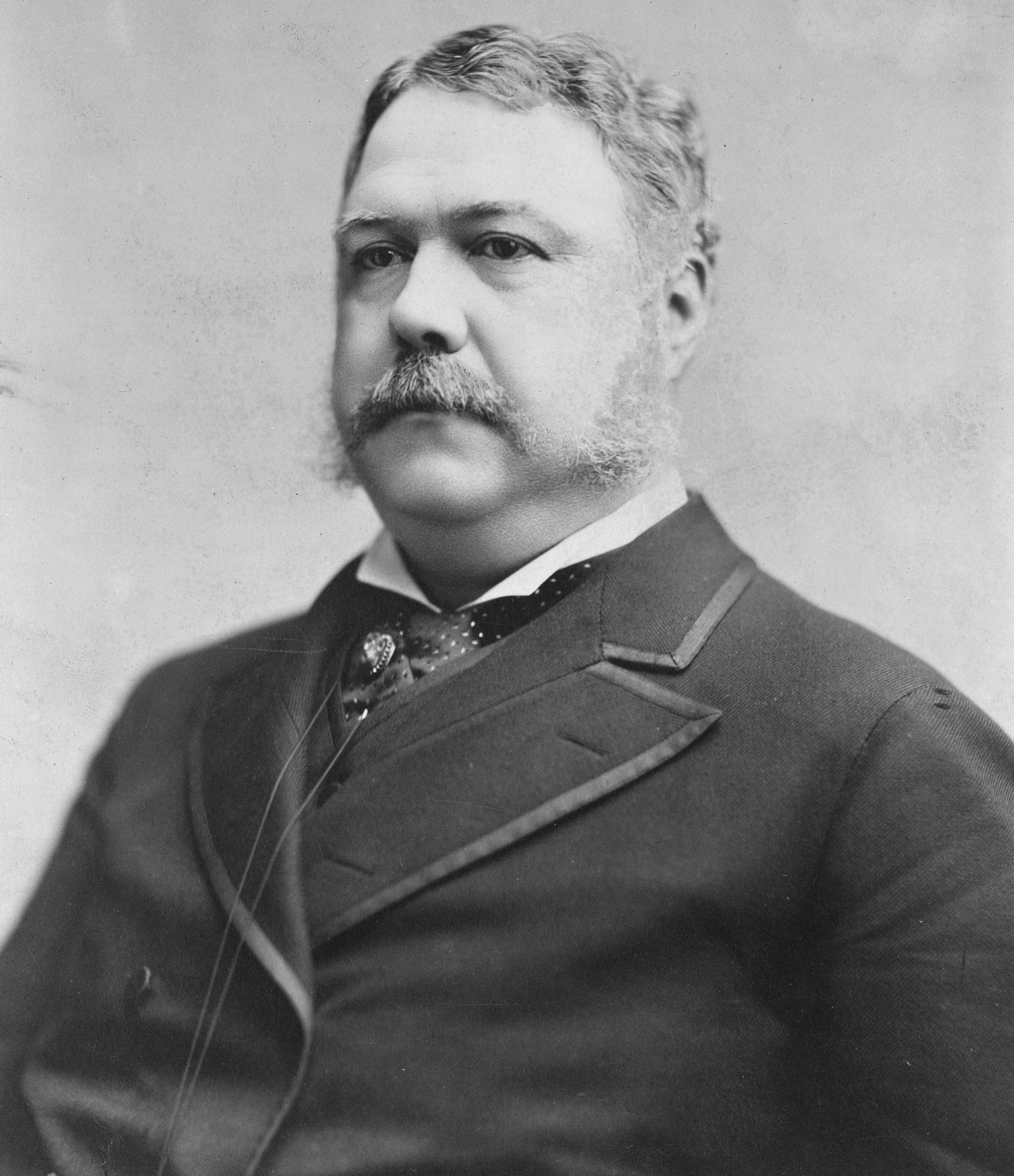
Chester A. Arthur

Following is a list of all Article III United States federal judges appointed by President Chester A. Arthur during his presidency. In total Arthur appointed 21 Article III federal judges, including 2 Justices to the Supreme Court of the United States, 4 judges to the United States circuit courts, and 15 judges to the United States district courts. Arthur shared the appointment of Addison Brown with his predecessor, James A. Garfield, with Garfield placing him on the bench via a recess appointment and Arthur later nominating him to the same seat and issuing his commission. William White was confirmed by the United States Senate and received his commission from President Arthur, but died before taking the oath of office or commencing service. Nevertheless, he is counted as a successful appointment.

Arthur appointed 4 judges to the United States Court of Claims, an Article I tribunal.

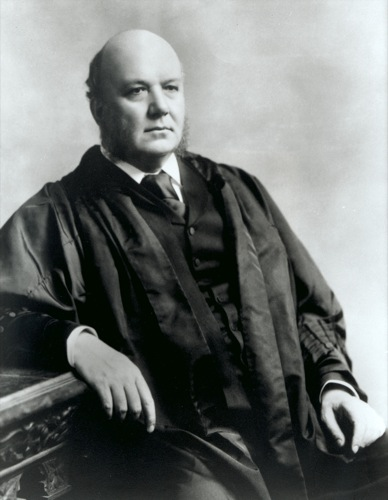
Justice Horace Gray, Arthur's first and longest serving appointee to the Supreme Court

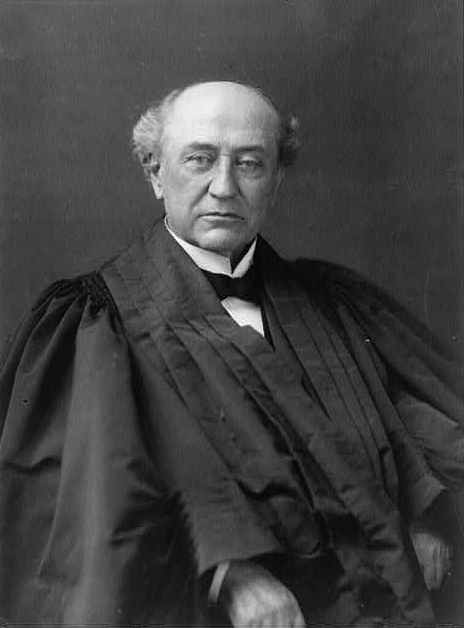
David Josiah Brewer, appointed to the Eighth Circuit Court by Arthur, was later elevated to the Supreme Court.

== United States Supreme Court justices ==
#	Justice	Seat	State	Former justice	Nomination date	Confirmation date	Began active service	Ended active service
1	Horace Gray	2	Massachusetts	Nathan Clifford	December 19, 1881	December 20, 1881	December 20, 1881	September 15, 1902
2	Samuel Blatchford	1	New York	Ward Hunt	March 13, 1882	March 22, 1882	March 22, 1882	July 7, 1893

== Circuit courts ==
#	Judge	Circuit	Nomination date	Confirmation date	Began active service	Ended active service
1	William James Wallace	Second	March 28, 1882	April 6, 1882	April 6, 1882	May 8, 1907
2	David J. Brewer	Eighth	March 25, 1884	March 31, 1884	March 31, 1884	January 6, 1890
3	LeBaron Bradford Colt	First	July 2, 1884	July 5, 1884	July 5, 1884	February 7, 1913
4	Walter Q. Gresham	Seventh	December 3, 1884	December 9, 1884	October 28, 1884	March 3, 1893

== District courts ==
#	Judge	Court (Note: See List of United States district and territorial courts)	Nomination date	Confirmation date	Began active service	Ended active service
1	Addison Brown	S.D.N.Y.	October 12, 1881	October 14, 1881	June 2, 1881	August 30, 1901
2	Nathan Webb	D. Me.	January 18, 1882	January 24, 1882	January 24, 1882	June 30, 1902
3	Augustus Sherrill Seymour	E.D.N.C.	February 14, 1882	February 21, 1882	February 21, 1882	February 19, 1897
4	Alfred Conkling Coxe Sr.	N.D.N.Y.	April 24, 1882	May 4, 1882	May 4, 1882	June 14, 1902
5	George Myron Sabin	D. Nev.	July 20, 1882	July 26, 1882	July 26, 1882	May 12, 1890
6	Henry Kent McCay	N.D. Ga.	August 3, 1882	August 4, 1882	August 4, 1882	July 30, 1886
7	Oliver Perry Shiras	N.D. Iowa	August 3, 1882	August 4, 1882	August 4, 1882	November 1, 1903
8	William White	S.D. Ohio	February 9, 1883	February 19, 1883	February 19, 1883	March 12, 1883
9	John Paul	W.D. Va.	February 27, 1883	March 3, 1883	March 3, 1883	November 1, 1901
10	George Read Sage	S.D. Ohio	December 18, 1883	January 7, 1884	March 20, 1883	August 24, 1898
11	William Allen Woods	D. Ind.	December 18, 1883	January 7, 1884	May 2, 1883	March 21, 1892
12	Leonard Eugene Wales	D. Del.	March 6, 1884	March 20, 1884	March 20, 1884	February 8, 1897
13	Chauncey Brewer Sabin	E.D. Tex.	March 25, 1884	April 5, 1884	April 5, 1884	March 30, 1890
14	George Moulton Carpenter Jr.	D.R.I.	December 16, 1884	December 18, 1884	December 18, 1884	July 31, 1896
15	Emory Speer	S.D. Ga.	January 19, 1885	February 18, 1885	February 18, 1885	December 13, 1918

== Specialty courts (Article I) ==
=== United States Court of Claims ===
#	Judge	Nomination date	Confirmation date	Began active service	Ended active service
1	Bancroft Davis	December 13, 1882	December 20, 1882	December 20, 1882	November 5, 1883
2	Lawrence Weldon	December 12, 1883	December 18, 1883	November 24, 1883	April 10, 1905
3	William Adams Richardson	January 15, 1885	January 20, 1885	January 20, 1885	October 19, 1896
4	John Davis	January 15, 1885	January 20, 1885	January 20, 1885	May 5, 1902

== Sources ==
- Federal Judicial Center
