= Carl Bernard Rubin =

American judge (1920–1995)

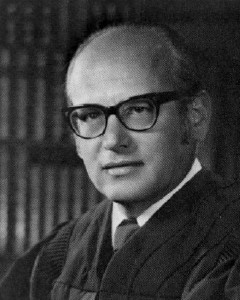

Chief Judge of the United States District Court for the Southern District of Ohio
- In office 1979–1990
- Preceded by: David Stewart Porter
- Succeeded by: John David Holschuh

Judge of the United States District Court for the Southern District of Ohio
- In office May 20, 1971 – August 2, 1995
- Appointed by: Richard Nixon
- Preceded by: Seat established by 84 Stat. 294
- Succeeded by: Edmund A. Sargus Jr.

Personal details
- Born: Carl Bernard Rubin; March 27, 1920 Cincinnati, Ohio, U.S.
- Died: August 2, 1995 (aged 75) Cincinnati, Ohio, U.S.
- Education: University of Cincinnati (BA, LLB)

Carl Bernard Rubin (March 27, 1920 – August 2, 1995) was a United States district judge of the United States District Court for the Southern District of Ohio.

== Education and career ==
Rubini was born in Cincinnati, Ohio. He received a Bachelor of Arts degree from the University of Cincinnati in 1942 and a Bachelor of Laws from the University of Cincinnati College of Law in 1944. He was in private practice in Cincinnati from 1944 to 1971, working as an assistant prosecuting attorney of Hamilton County, Ohio from 1950 to 1960.

=== Federal judicial service ===
On April 29, 1971, Rubin was nominated by President Richard Nixon to a new seat on the United States District Court for the Southern District of Ohio created by 84 Stat. 294. He was confirmed by the United States Senate on May 20, 1971, and received his commission the same day. He served as Chief Judge from 1979 to 1990. His service terminated on August 2, 1995, due to his death of cancer in Cincinnati.

== See also ==
- List of Jewish American jurists

Legal offices
| Preceded by Seat established by 84 Stat. 294 | Judge of the United States District Court for the Southern District of Ohio; 1971–1995 | Succeeded by Edmund A. Sargus Jr. |
| Preceded by David Stewart Porter | Chief Judge of the United States District Court for the Southern District of Ohio; 1979–1990 | Succeeded by John David Holschuh |
