= Albert C. Thompson =

American judge (1842–1910)

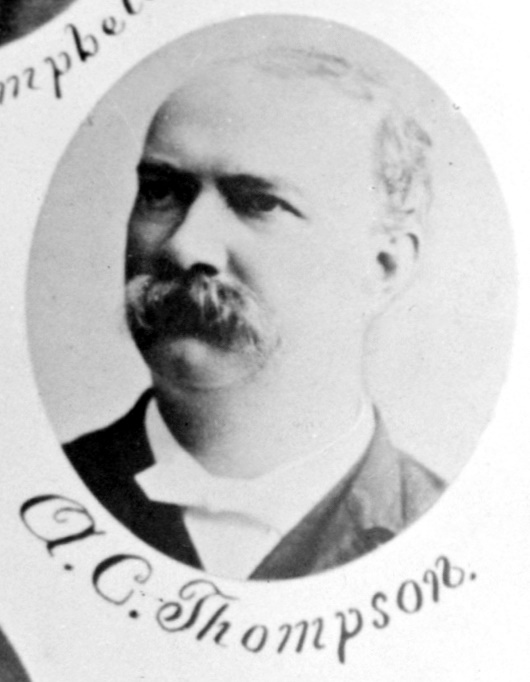
- c. 1887

Judge of the United States District Court for the Southern District of Ohio
- In office September 23, 1898 – January 26, 1910
- Appointed by: William McKinley
- Preceded by: George Read Sage
- Succeeded by: Seat abolished

Member of the U.S. House of Representatives from Ohio
- In office March 4, 1885 – March 3, 1891
- Preceded by: Alphonso Hart
- Succeeded by: John M. Pattison
- Constituency: 12th district (1885–1887); 11th district (1887–1891)

Personal details
- Born: Albert Clifton Thompson; January 23, 1842 Brookville, Pennsylvania, US
- Died: January 26, 1910 (aged 68) Cincinnati, Ohio, US
- Resting place: Greenlawn Cemetery; Portsmouth, Ohio, US
- Party: Republican
- Spouse: Ella A. Turley
- Education: Jefferson College read law

Military service
- Allegiance: United States
- Branch/service: (United States) Union Army
- Years of service: 1861–1863
- Rank: Captain
- Unit: 105th Pennsylvania Infantry
- Battles/wars: American Civil War

Albert Clifton Thompson (January 23, 1842 – January 26, 1910) was an American lawyer and Civil War veteran who served as a United States representative from Ohio and a United States district judge of the United States District Court for the Southern District of Ohio.

== Education and career ==
Born on January 23, 1842, in Brookville, Jefferson County, Pennsylvania, Thompson attended the common schools and Jefferson College in Canonsburg, Pennsylvania (now Washington & Jefferson College in Washington, Pennsylvania) and began the study of law.

=== Civil War ===
He served in the Union Army during the American Civil War as a second lieutenant of Company B, One Hundred and Fifth Regiment, Pennsylvania Volunteer Infantry. He was promoted to captain of Company K in the same regiment on November 28, 1861. He served until March 23, 1863, when he was discharged on account of wounds received in the Second Battle of Bull Run. After the war, he was elected as a companion of the Ohio Commandery of the Military Order of the Loyal Legion of the United States.

=== Lawyer and judge ===
He resumed the study of law and read law in 1864, being admitted to the bar on December 13, 1864. He entered private practice in Brookville in 1864. He continued private practice in Portsmouth, Ohio from 1865 to 1870. He was a Judge of the Scioto County, Ohio Probate Court from 1870 to 1873. He resumed private practice in Portsmouth from 1873 to 1881. He was a Judge of the Ohio Court of Common Pleas for the Seventh Judicial District from 1881 to 1884.

== Congressional service ==
Thompson was elected as a Republican to the United States House of Representatives of the 49th, 50th and 51st United States Congresses, serving from March 4, 1885, to March 3, 1891. He was elected from Ohio's 12th congressional district for his first term and from Ohio's 11th congressional district for his two subsequent terms. He was an unsuccessful candidate for renomination in 1890.

== Later career ==
He resumed private practice in Portsmouth from 1891 to 1898. He was appointed by President McKinley as chairman of the commission to revise and codify the criminal and penal laws of the United States on June 21, 1897.

== Federal judicial service ==
Thompson received a recess appointment from President William McKinley on September 23, 1898, to a seat on the United States District Court for the Southern District of Ohio vacated by Judge George Read Sage. He was nominated to the same position by President McKinley on December 13, 1898. He was confirmed by the United States Senate on December 20, 1898, and received his commission the same day.

== Death and burial ==
His service terminated on January 26, 1910, due to his death in Cincinnati, Ohio at the age of 68. He was interred in Greenlawn Cemetery in Portsmouth.

== Sources ==
- "Albert Clifton Thompson". Biographical Directory of the United States Congress.

U.S. House of Representatives
Preceded by Alphonso Hart	Member of the U.S. House of Representatives from Ohio's 12th congressional district 1885–1887	Succeeded by Jacob J. Pugsley
Preceded by William W. Ellsberry	Member of the U.S. House of Representatives from Ohio's 11th congressional district 1887–1891	Succeeded by John M. Pattison
Legal offices
Preceded by George Read Sage	Judge of the United States District Court for the Southern District of Ohio; 1898–1910	Succeeded by Seat abolished
