= Thomas M. Rose =

American judge (born 1948)

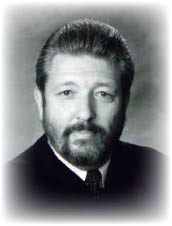

Senior Judge of the United States District Court for the Southern District of Ohio
- Incumbent
- Assumed office June 30, 2017

Judge of the United States District Court for the Southern District of Ohio
- In office May 10, 2002 – June 30, 2017
- Appointed by: George W. Bush
- Preceded by: Herman Jacob Weber
- Succeeded by: Matthew W. McFarland

Personal details
- Born: 1948 (age 77–78) Circleville, Ohio
- Education: Ohio University (BS); University of Cincinnati College of Law (JD)

Thomas Michael Rose (born 1948) is a senior United States district judge of the United States District Court for the Southern District of Ohio.

== Education and career ==
Rose was born in Circleville, Ohio and graduated from Laurelville High School in 1966. He received a Bachelor of Science degree from Ohio University in 1970, where he was a member of the Army Reserve Officers' Training Corps from 1966 to 1970. Upon graduation, he became a second lieutenant in the United States Army Ordnance Corps. He served in the army reserves from 1970 to 1978.

He received a Juris Doctor from the University of Cincinnati College of Law in 1973. He was in private practice in Ohio from 1973 to 1975. He was an Assistant prosecutor, Greene County Prosecutor's Office, Ohio from 1973 to 1975. He was in private practice in Ohio, 1975-1976 from 1978 to 1991. He was a Chief juvenile court referee, Juvenile Division, Greene County Common Pleas Court, Ohio from 1976 to 1977. He was a Chief assistant in charge, Civil Division, Greene County Prosecutor's Office, Ohio from 1978 to 1991. He was a judge on the Greene County Common Pleas Court, Ohio from 1991 to 2002.

== District court service ==
Rose is a United States District Judge of the United States District Court for the Southern District of Ohio. Rose was nominated by President George W. Bush on January 23, 2002, to a seat vacated by Herman Jacob Weber. He was confirmed by the United States Senate on May 9, 2002, and received his commission on May 10, 2002. He assumed senior status on June 30, 2017.

Legal offices
Preceded by Herman Jacob Weber	Judge of the United States District Court for the Southern District of Ohio; 2002–2017	Succeeded by Matthew W. McFarland
