= Herman Jacob Weber =

American judge (born 1927)

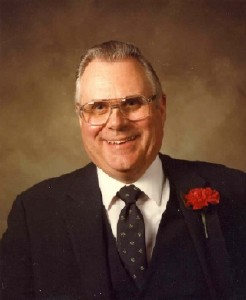

Senior Judge of the United States District Court for the Southern District of Ohio
- Incumbent
- Assumed office January 1, 2002

Judge of the United States District Court for the Southern District of Ohio
- In office April 4, 1985 – January 1, 2002
- Appointed by: Ronald Reagan
- Preceded by: Seat established by 98 Stat. 333
- Succeeded by: Thomas M. Rose

Personal details
- Born: 1927 (age 98–99) Lima, Ohio, U.S.
- Education: Otterbein University (BA); Ohio State University (JD)

Herman Jacob Weber (born 1927) is a senior United States district judge of the United States District Court for the Southern District of Ohio.

== Education and career ==
Herman Jacob Weber was born in 1927 Lima, Ohio. He was in the United States Navy just after World War II, from 1945 to 1946. He received a Bachelor of Arts degree from Otterbein University in 1949 and a Juris Doctor from the Ohio State University Moritz College of Law in 1952.

He was in private practice in Fairborn, Ohio from 1952 to 1961. He was the Deputy Mayor of the Fairborn Mayor's Court from 1955 to 1957. He was a Fairborn acting municipal judge (intermittently) from 1958 to 1960. He was a judge of the Common Pleas Court in Green County from 1961 to 1982. He was a judge of the Second District Court of Appeals from 1982 to 1985.

=== Federal judicial service ===
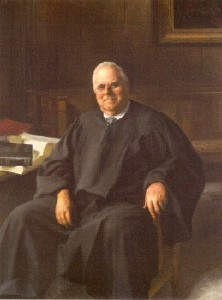
Judicial portrait of Weber, 2004, by James Michael Ostlund.

Weber was nominated by President Ronald Reagan on February 28, 1985, to the United States District Court for the Southern District of Ohio, to a new seat created by 98 Stat. 333. He was confirmed by the United States Senate on April 3, 1985, and received his commission on April 4, 1985. He assumed senior status on January 1, 2002.

Legal offices
Preceded by Seat established by 98 Stat. 333	Judge of the United States District Court for the Southern District of Ohio; 1985–2002	Succeeded by Thomas M. Rose
