= Susan J. Dlott =

American judge (born 1949)

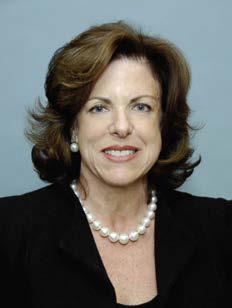

Senior Judge of the United States District Court for the Southern District of Ohio
- Incumbent
- Assumed office May 31, 2018

Chief Judge of the United States District Court for the Southern District of Ohio
- In office 2009–2015
- Preceded by: Sandra Beckwith
- Succeeded by: Edmund A. Sargus Jr.

Judge of the United States District Court for the Southern District of Ohio
- In office December 26, 1995 – May 31, 2018
- Appointed by: Bill Clinton
- Preceded by: S. Arthur Spiegel
- Succeeded by: Douglas R. Cole

Personal details
- Born: 1949 (age 76–77) Dayton, Ohio, U.S.
- Spouse: Stanley M. Chesley (m. 1991; died 2025)
- Education: University of Pennsylvania (BA); Boston University (JD)

Susan Judy Dlott (born in 1949) is a senior United States district judge of the United States District Court for the Southern District of Ohio.

== Early life and education ==
Dlott was born in Dayton, Ohio to Jewish Russian immigrant parents. Dlott received a Bachelor of Arts degree from the University of Pennsylvania in 1970 and a Juris Doctor from Boston University School of Law in 1973.

== Career ==
She was a law clerk to Alvin Krenzler and Jack Day of the Ohio Court of Appeals from 1973 to 1974, then became an Assistant United States Attorney for the Southern District of Ohio from 1975 to 1979. She entered private practice in Cincinnati, Ohio, in 1979. In 1981, Dlott became the first female partner at Graydon Head & Ritchey, a Cincinnati law firm.

=== Federal judicial service ===
On August 10, 1995, President Bill Clinton nominated Dlott to a seat on the United States District Court for the Southern District of Ohio vacated by S. Arthur Spiegel. Dlott was confirmed by the United States Senate on December 22, 1995, and received her commission on December 26, 1995. She served as chief judge of the court from 2009 to 2015. She assumed senior status on May 31, 2018.

=== Notable case ===
Dlott approved a landmark Cincinnati anti-racial profiling agreement in 2002.

== Personal life ==
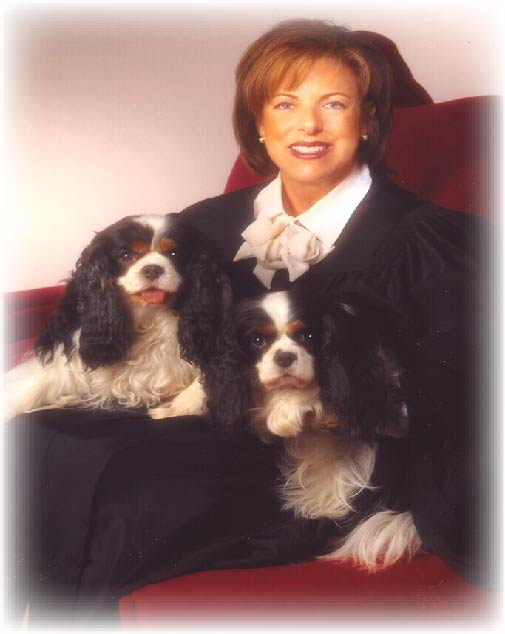
Dlott with her Cavalier King Charles Spaniels

Dlott's first husband was builder and developer Austin Eldon Knowlton. Her second husband was Stanley M. Chesley; they married in 1991. Chesley, a former trial lawyer, was disbarred by the Kentucky Supreme Court in 2013. Chesley died in 2025.

In 2004, Chesley purchased "what is believed to be the most expensive single-family home listed in Greater Cincinnati, possibly ever," a six-bedroom, seven-bathroom, French chateau-style home on 5.3 acres (21,000 m^{2}) nestled into 300 acres (1.2 km^{2}) of private green space with 27,000 square feet (2,500 m^{2}) of living space. The estate has a wine cellar and two four-car garages with apartments on top.

Dlott and her husband were victims of a violent, armed home invasion robbery by "three men with guns and masks", Terry Darnell Jackson, 21, Demetrius Williams, 20, and Darrell Joseph Kinney, 20, on December 4, 2015. Chesley and Dlott, who were held at gunpoint, both sustained injuries. The three perpetrators were apprehended and pleaded guilty, and in April 2016, the men were all sentenced to 34 years in prison. Dlott gave testimony at the sentencing hearing.

Dlott was described by the Cincinnati Enquirer in 2002 as "sometimes eccentric, often unconventional." Dlott has described herself as a "lenient judge". She is known for her fondness for Cavalier King Charles Spaniels.

== See also ==
- List of Jewish American jurists

Legal offices
Preceded by S. Arthur Spiegel	Judge of the United States District Court for the Southern District of Ohio; 1995–2018	Succeeded by Douglas R. Cole
Preceded by Sandra Beckwith	Chief Judge of the United States District Court for the Southern District of Ohio; 2009–2015	Succeeded by Edmund A. Sargus Jr.
