= John Weld Peck =

American judge (1874–1937)

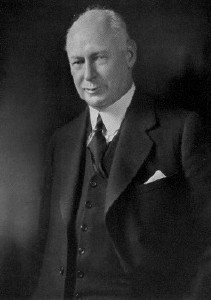

Judge of the United States District Court for the Southern District of Ohio
- In office November 5, 1919 – April 3, 1923
- Appointed by: Woodrow Wilson
- Preceded by: Howard Clark Hollister
- Succeeded by: Smith Hickenlooper

Personal details
- Born: John Weld Peck; February 5, 1874 Wyoming, Ohio
- Died: August 10, 1937 (aged 63)
- Education: Harvard University (A.B.); University of Cincinnati College of Law (LL.B.)

John Weld Peck (February 5, 1874 – August 10, 1937) was a United States district judge of the United States District Court for the Southern District of Ohio.

== Education and career ==
Born in Wyoming, Ohio, Peck received an Artium Baccalaureus degree from Harvard University in 1896 and a Bachelor of Laws from the University of Cincinnati College of Law in 1898. He was in private practice in Cincinnati, Ohio from 1898 to 1919.

== Federal judicial service ==
On October 30, 1919, Peck was nominated by President Woodrow Wilson to a seat on the United States District Court for the Southern District of Ohio vacated by Judge Howard Clark Hollister. Peck was confirmed by the United States Senate on November 5, 1919, and received his commission the same day. Peck served in that capacity until April 3, 1923, when he resigned.

== Later career and death ==
After his resignation from the federal bench, Peck returned to private practice in Cincinnati until his death on August 10, 1937.

== Family ==
Peck was the uncle and namesake of John Weld Peck II, also a United States federal judge.

== Sources ==
Legal offices
Preceded by Howard Clark Hollister	Judge of the United States District Court for the Southern District of Ohio; 1919–1923	Succeeded by Smith Hickenlooper
