= Michael R. Barrett =

American judge (born 1951)

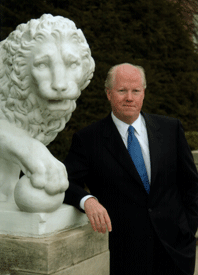

Senior Judge of the United States District Court for the Southern District of Ohio
- Incumbent
- Assumed office February 15, 2019

Judge of the United States District Court for the Southern District of Ohio
- In office May 5, 2006 – February 15, 2019
- Appointed by: George W. Bush
- Preceded by: Walter Herbert Rice
- Succeeded by: Michael J. Newman

Personal details
- Born: Michael Ryan Barrett; January 14, 1951 (age 75) Cincinnati, Ohio, U.S.
- Education: University of Cincinnati (BA, JD)

Michael Ryan Barrett (born January 14, 1951) is a senior United States district judge in Ohio. Barrett practiced law for nearly 30 years before he was nominated by President George W. Bush and approved by the Senate to the United States District Court for the Southern District of Ohio in 2006.

== Education ==
Barrett was born in Cincinnati, Ohio, on January 14, 1951. He graduated from St. Xavier High School in 1969. He then attended Wabash College in Crawfordsville, Indiana, from 1969 to 1970, prior to enrolling at the University of Cincinnati. Barrett received a Bachelor of Arts degree in history there in 1974 and a Juris Doctor from the University of Cincinnati College of Law in 1977. He was admitted to the bar in Ohio the same year.

== Career ==
Barrett served as a state administrative hearing officer from 1977 until 1978, when he joined the Hamilton County Prosecutor's Office as an assistant prosecuting attorney and chief assistant. In 1984, he joined the firm Grayden, Head & Ritchey. He began as an associate and became partner at Grayden Head. In 1995, Barrett joined his brother Francis Barrett's firm, Barrett & Weber, and became a shareholder. He practiced at Barrett & Weber until his appointment to the bench.

Barrett served as chairman of the Hamilton County Republican Party from 2001 to 2005 and was instrumental in President Bush's Ohio victory in the 2004 presidential election.

=== Federal judicial service ===
Barrett was nominated by President George W. Bush on December 16, 2005 to serve as a United States district judge of the United States District Court for the Southern District of Ohio. He was nominated to a seat vacated by Judge Walter Herbert Rice. He was confirmed by the United States Senate on May 1, 2006, and received his commission on May 5, 2006. He assumed senior status on February 15, 2019.

Legal offices
Preceded by Walter Herbert Rice	Judge of the United States District Court for the Southern District of Ohio; 2006–2019	Succeeded by Michael J. Newman
