= Senator Upson =

Senator Upson may refer to:

- Charles Upson (1821–1885), Michigan State Senate
- William H. Upson (1823–1910), Ohio State Senate
