= John H. Druffel =

American judge (1886–1967)

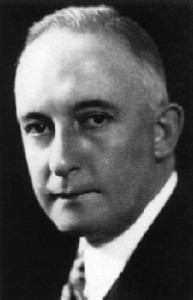

Senior Judge of the United States District Court for the Southern District of Ohio
- In office September 30, 1961 – May 16, 1967

Judge of the United States District Court for the Southern District of Ohio
- In office September 22, 1937 – September 30, 1961
- Appointed by: Franklin D. Roosevelt
- Preceded by: Seat established by 50 Stat. 805
- Succeeded by: Seat abolished

Personal details
- Born: John H. Druffel; February 6, 1886 Cincinnati, Ohio
- Died: May 16, 1967 (aged 81)
- Education: Salmon P. Chase College of Law

John H. Druffel (February 6, 1886 – May 16, 1967) was a United States district judge of the United States District Court for the Southern District of Ohio.

== Education and career ==
Born in Cincinnati, Ohio, Druffel attended the YMCA Law School (then located in Cincinnati, now the Salmon P. Chase College of Law at Northern Kentucky University) in 1911. He was in private practice in Cincinnati from 1912 to 1932. He was Vice Mayor and a member of the Cincinnati City Council from 1929 to 1932. He was a Judge of the Court of Common Pleas of Hamilton County, Ohio from 1933 to 1937.

== Federal judicial service ==
On September 22, 1937, Druffel received a recess appointment from President Franklin D. Roosevelt to a new seat on the United States District Court for the Southern District of Ohio created by 50 Stat. 805. Formally nominated to the same seat by President Roosevelt on November 16, 1937, he was confirmed by the United States Senate on December 8, 1937, and received his commission on December 14, 1937. He assumed senior status on September 30, 1961, serving in that capacity until his death on May 16, 1967.

== Sources ==
Legal offices
Preceded by Seat established by 50 Stat. 805	Judge of the United States District Court for the Southern District of Ohio; 1937–1961	Succeeded by Seat abolished
