= Sandra Beckwith =

American judge (born 1943)

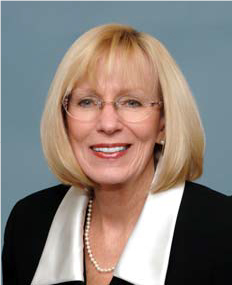

Senior Judge of the United States District Court for the Southern District of Ohio
- Incumbent
- Assumed office January 1, 2009

Chief Judge of the United States District Court for the Southern District of Ohio
- In office October 4, 2004 – January 1, 2009
- Preceded by: James L. Graham
- Succeeded by: Susan J. Dlott

Judge of the United States District Court for the Southern District of Ohio
- In office February 10, 1992 – January 1, 2009
- Appointed by: George H. W. Bush
- Preceded by: Seat established by 104 Stat. 5089
- Succeeded by: Timothy Black

Personal details
- Born: Sandra Lea Shank; December 4, 1943 (age 82) Norfolk, Virginia, U.S.
- Education: University of Cincinnati (BA, JD)

Sandra Lea Shank Beckwith, also known as Sandra L. Ammann, (born December 4, 1943) is a senior United States District Judge, the first woman to sit on the United States District Court for the Southern District of Ohio.

== Education and career ==
Beckwith was born in Norfolk, Virginia; she is the daughter of Charles Langdale and Lorraine (Sterneberg) Shank. She was married to James Beckwith from 1965 to their divorce in 1978. She married Thomas R. Ammann in 1979. Beckwith received her Bachelor of Arts degree in 1965 and her Juris Doctor in 1968, both from the University of Cincinnati. She was admitted to the Ohio bar in 1969, the Indiana bar in 1976, the Florida bar in 1979, and the Supreme Court of the United States bar in 1977. She practiced law in Harrison, Ohio from 1969 to 1977 and again from 1979 to 1981 with her father. Beckwith was a judge on the Hamilton County Municipal Court from 1977 to 1979 and again from 1981 to 1986. She was a judge of the Hamilton County Court of Common Pleas's domestic relations division from 1987 to 1989 when she was appointed to the Hamilton County Commission. In 1990, she was elected to Commission serving until her resignation in 1992. From 1989 to 1991 she was also an associate with the Cincinnati law firm of Graydon Head & Ritchey LLP.

=== Federal judicial service ===
Beckwith was nominated by President George H. W. Bush on July 26, 1991, to the United States District Court for the Southern District of Ohio, to a new seat authorized by 104 Stat. 5089. She was confirmed by the United States Senate on February 6, 1992, and received commission on February 10, 1992. She served as Chief Judge, from October 4, 2004, to January 1, 2009. She assumed senior status on January 1, 2009.

== Other service ==
She has served on commissions on lawyers' professional responsibility, prison overcrowding, death penalty appeals, and computerization of the courts. Since 1996, she has been a board member of the Cincinnati chapter of the American Red Cross.

Legal offices
| Preceded by Seat established by 104 Stat. 5089 | Judge of the United States District Court for the Southern District of Ohio; 1992–2009 | Succeeded by Timothy Black |
| Preceded by James L. Graham | Chief Judge of the United States District Court for the Southern District of Ohio; 2004–2009 | Succeeded by Susan J. Dlott |
