= William White (Ohio judge) =

American judge (1822–1883)

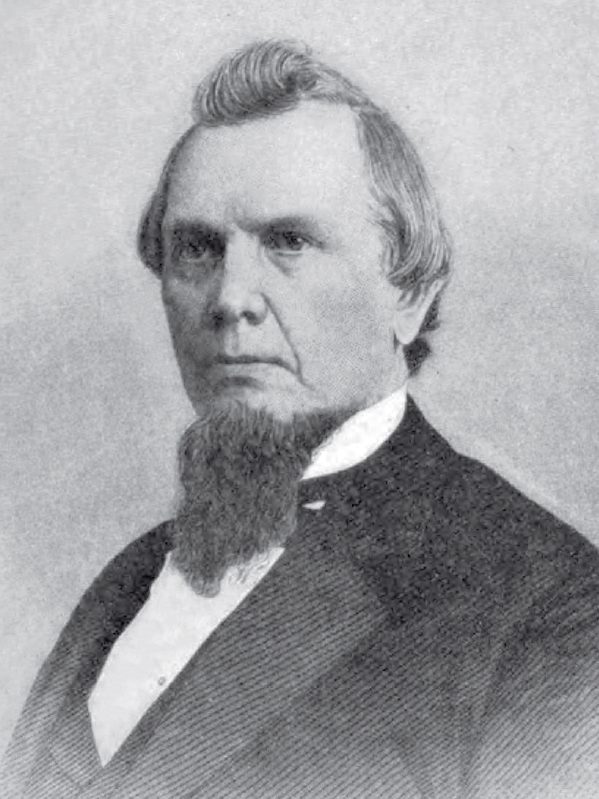

Judge of the United States District Court for the Southern District of Ohio
- In office February 19, 1883 – March 12, 1883
- Appointed by: Chester A. Arthur
- Preceded by: Philip Bergen Swing
- Succeeded by: George Read Sage

Justice of the Supreme Court of Ohio
- In office February 10, 1864 – March 12, 1883
- Appointed by: John Brough
- Preceded by: Hocking H. Hunter
- Succeeded by: William H. Upson

Personal details
- Born: William White; January 28, 1822 England
- Died: March 12, 1883 (aged 61) Springfield, Ohio, U.S.
- Resting place: Ferncliff Cemetery; Springfield, Ohio
- Party: Republican
- Education: read law

William White (January 28, 1822 – March 12, 1883) was an American justice of the Supreme Court of Ohio and was appointed as a United States district judge of the United States District Court for the Southern District of Ohio, but died without taking the oath of office or commencing service.

== Education and career ==
Born on January 28, 1822, in England, White's parents died, and White was brought to Springfield, Ohio in 1831 by an uncle. At age 12 he was apprenticed to a cabinetmaker for nine years. He purchased his contract after six years. After graduating from high school, he taught school, and read law in 1846. He entered private practice in Springfield, Ohio from 1846 to 1852. He was elected prosecutor for Clark County, Ohio in 1847 and reelected three times, serving from 1847 to 1856. He was a Judge of the Clark County Court of Common Pleas from 1856 to 1864. When Justice Hocking H. Hunter resigned February 9, 1864 from the Supreme Court of Ohio, White was appointed to the seat the next day. He won election to the remainder of the term in 1864, and won re-election to five year terms in 1868, 1873 and 1878, ultimately serving on the Supreme Court until his death.

== Federal judicial service ==
White was nominated by President Chester A. Arthur on February 9, 1883, to a seat on the United States District Court for the Southern District of Ohio vacated by Judge Philip Bergen Swing. He was confirmed by the United States Senate on February 19, 1883, and received his commission the same day. His service terminated on March 12, 1883, due to his death in Springfield. White died without taking the oath of office or commencing service on the district court and still was actively serving on the Supreme Court of Ohio at the time of his death. Funeral services were at his home and later at the Second Presbyterian Church, where he was a member. He was buried in Ferncliff Cemetery.

== Family ==
White was married to Rachel Stout of Springfield on October 21, 1847, and had one son and two daughters.

== Sources ==
- "White, William - Federal Judicial Center". www.fjc.gov.
- Smith, Joseph P, ed. (1898). History of the Republican Party in Ohio. Vol. I. Chicago: the Lewis Publishing Company.
- Randall, Emilius; Ryan, Daniel Joseph (1912). History of Ohio: the Rise and Progress of an American State. Vol. 5. New York: The Century History Company.

Legal offices
Preceded by Hocking H. Hunter	Justice of the Supreme Court of Ohio; 1864–1883	Succeeded by William H. Upson
Preceded by Philip Bergen Swing	Judge of the United States District Court for the Southern District of Ohio; 1883	Succeeded by George Read Sage
