= Matthew R. Byrne =

American judge (born 1981)

Matthew Richard Byrne

Judge of the United States District Court for the Southern District of Ohio
- Incumbent
- Assumed office September 30, 2026
- Appointed by: Donald Trump
- Preceded by: Michael H. Watson

Judge of the Ohio District Court of Appeals for the Twelfth District
- In office January 1, 2021 – September 2026

Personal details
- Born: Matthew Richard Byrne; 1981 (age 44–45) Evansville, Indiana, U.S.
- Education: Xavier University (BA); Ohio State University (JD)

Matthew Richard Byrne (born 1981) is an American lawyer who has served as a judge of the Ohio Twelfth District Court of Appeals since 2021. He serves as a United States district judge of the United States District Court for the Southern District of Ohio.

== Education ==
Byrne was born in 1981. He received a Bachelor of Arts degree from Xavier University magna cum laude, in 2003, and a Juris Doctor from the Moritz College of Law at Ohio State University, cum laude, in 2007.

== Career ==
Prior to entering law school Byrne served in the President George W. Bush administration as a member of the White House Office of Presidential Personnel. From 2007 to 2010 he was an associate at Taft Stettinius & Hollister LLP in Cincinnati. From January 2010 to December 2020, Byrne was a partner at Jackson Lewis P.C. at its Cincinnati office. At both firms, he focused on employment law. In 2020, Byrne was elected to be a judge on the Ohio Twelfth District Court of Appeals.

=== Nomination to district court ===
In late 2025, Byrne was recommended to serve on the federal court by Vice President JD Vance. On May 27, 2026, President Donald Trump announced his intention to nominate Byrne to an undesignated seat on the United States District Court for the Southern District of Ohio. On June 15, 2026, Trump nominated Byrne to the seat vacated by Judge Michael H. Watson. On June 24, 2026, Byrne had his confirmation hearing before the Senate Judiciary Committee. On July 23, 2026, his nomination was reported to the full Senate by a 12–10 vote. On September 15, 2026, his nomination was confirmed by a 52–45 vote. He received his judicial commission on September 30, 2026.

Legal offices
Preceded by Michael H. Watson	Judge of the United States District Court for the Southern District of Ohio; 2026–present	Incumbent
