= Timothy Black =

American judge (born 1953)

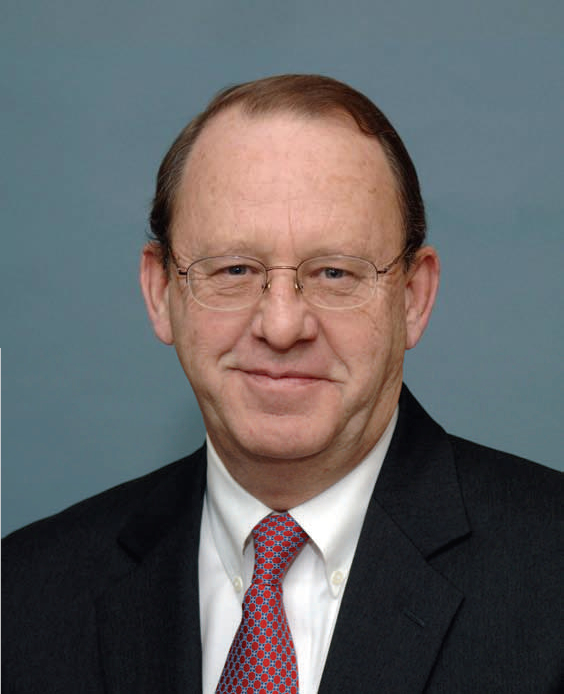

Senior Judge of the United States District Court for the Southern District of Ohio
- Incumbent
- Assumed office May 18, 2022

Judge of the United States District Court for the Southern District of Ohio
- In office May 13, 2010 – May 18, 2022
- Appointed by: Barack Obama
- Preceded by: Sandra Beckwith
- Succeeded by: Jeffery P. Hopkins

Magistrate Judge of the United States District Court for the Southern District of Ohio
- In office 2004 – May 13, 2010

Personal details
- Born: August 30, 1953 (age 72) Brookline, Massachusetts, U.S.
- Relatives: Jon Favreau (son-in-law)
- Education: Harvard University (AB); Northern Kentucky University (JD)

Timothy Seymour Black (born August 30, 1953) is a senior United States district judge of the United States District Court for the Southern District of Ohio.

== Education ==
Black earned a Bachelor of Arts from Harvard College in 1975 and then earned a Juris Doctor in 1983 from the Salmon P. Chase College of Law of Northern Kentucky University.

== Career ==
Black practiced law as a civil litigator for the Cincinnati law firm of Graydon Head & Ritchey from 1983 until 1993.

In 1991, Black unsuccessfully ran in a judicial election for the Hamilton County Municipal Court as a Republican. In 1993, he ran as a Democrat and defeated sitting judge David Albanese. He served as a Hamilton County Municipal Court judge from 1994–2004. He ran unsuccessfully for a seat on the Ohio Supreme Court in 2000 and 2002.

=== Federal judicial service ===
In 2004, the judges of the U.S. District Court for the Southern District of Ohio selected Black as a United States magistrate judge. In July 2009, a bipartisan commission in Ohio selected Black from a list of three finalists and recommended him to President Barack Obama to fill a vacancy on the United States District Court for the Southern District of Ohio. On December 24, 2009, Obama formally nominated Black to fill the district court vacancy, which was created by Judge Sandra Beckwith taking senior status on January 1, 2009. On May 11, 2010, the United States Senate confirmed Black in a unanimous voice vote. He received his commission on May 13, 2010. He assumed senior status on May 18, 2022.

==== Recognition of same-sex married couple ====
On July 22, 2013, Black ruled that Ohio must recognize the same sex marriage of John Arthur and James Obergefell. Arthur, who died on October 22, 2013, of Lou Gehrig's disease, and Obergefell were married in Maryland, where same-sex marriage is recognized, in a ceremony on an airplane on the airport tarmac. The ruling meant the pair can be buried next to each other in Arthur's family plot, located at a cemetery that only allows descendants and spouses. Black reasoned that because Ohio recognizes out-of-state heterosexual marriages that would be prohibited in Ohio, such as marriages between first cousins or minors – including those who married outside Ohio for the sole purpose of evading its marriage laws – the state cannot single out homosexual marriages as the sole category of out-of-state marriages to which it will not grant recognition.

In September 2013, Ohio State Representative John Becker sent a letter to a member of the Ohio Congressional delegation asking him to initiate impeachment proceedings against Black. On December 23, 2013, Black ordered Ohio to recognize same-sex marriages from other states on death certificates, deeming Ohio's ban on same-sex marriage unconstitutional.

== Personal life ==
On June 17, 2017, Black's daughter, Emily, married Jon Favreau, a political podcaster and former speechwriter for President Barack Obama, at the Black family's vacation home in Biddeford Pool, Maine.

== Sources ==
- Timothy Black at Ballotpedia

Legal offices
Preceded by Sandra Beckwith	Judge of the United States District Court for the Southern District of Ohio; 2010–2022	Succeeded by Jeffery P. Hopkins
