= Philip Bergen Swing =

American judge

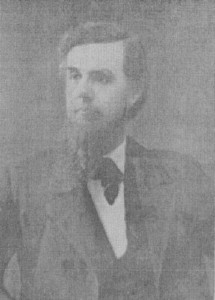

Judge of the United States District Court for the Southern District of Ohio
- In office March 30, 1871 – October 31, 1882
- Appointed by: Ulysses S. Grant
- Preceded by: Humphrey H. Leavitt
- Succeeded by: William White

Personal details
- Born: Philip Bergen Swing; October 23, 1820 Miami Township, Ohio, U.S.
- Died: October 31, 1882 (aged 62) Batavia, Ohio, U.S.
- Education: read law

Philip Bergen Swing (October 23, 1820 – October 31, 1882) was a United States district judge of the United States District Court for the Southern District of Ohio.

== Education and career ==
Born in Miami Township, Clermont County, Ohio, Swing read law to enter the bar in 1842. He was in private practice in Batavia, Ohio starting in 1842. He was a county prosecutor for Clermont County in 1847.

== Federal judicial service ==
On March 29, 1871, Swing was nominated by President Ulysses S. Grant to a seat on the United States District Court for the Southern District of Ohio vacated by Judge Humphrey H. Leavitt. Swing was confirmed by the United States Senate on March 30, 1871, and received his commission the same day. Swing served in that capacity until his death on October 31, 1882, in Batavia.

== Sources ==
Legal offices
Preceded by Humphrey H. Leavitt	Judge of the United States District Court for the Southern District of Ohio; 1871–1882	Succeeded by William White
