= Gregory L. Frost =

American judge (born 1949)

Gregory Lynn Frost
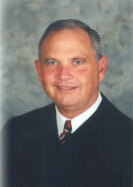

Judge of the United States District Court for the Southern District of Ohio
- In office March 11, 2003 – May 2, 2016
- Appointed by: George W. Bush
- Preceded by: George Curtis Smith
- Succeeded by: Sarah D. Morrison

Personal details
- Born: Gregory Lynn Frost; April 17, 1949 (age 76) Newark, Ohio, U.S.
- Education: Wittenberg University (BA); Claude W. Pettit College of Law (JD)

Gregory Lynn Frost (born April 17, 1949) is a former United States district judge of the United States District Court for the Southern District of Ohio.

== Education and career ==
Born in Newark, Ohio, Frost received a Bachelor of Arts degree from Wittenberg University in 1971 and a Juris Doctor from the Claude W. Pettit College of Law at Ohio Northern University in 1974. He was an Assistant prosecuting attorney of Licking County Prosecuting Attorney's Office, Ohio from 1974 to 1978, entering private practice in Ohio from 1978 to 1983. He was a judge on the Licking County Municipal Court from 1983 to 1990, and on the Licking County Common Pleas Court from 1990 to 2003.

== District court service ==
On January 7, 2003, Frost was nominated by President George W. Bush to a seat on the United States District Court for the Southern District of Ohio vacated by George Curtis Smith. Frost was confirmed by the United States Senate on March 10, 2003, and received his commission on March 11, 2003. He retired on May 2, 2016.

== Sources ==
Legal offices
Preceded by George Curtis Smith	Judge of the United States District Court for the Southern District of Ohio; 2003–2016	Succeeded by Sarah D. Morrison
