= Walter Herbert Rice =

American judge (born 1937)

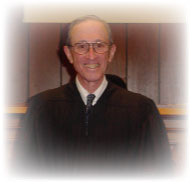

Senior Judge of the United States District Court for the Southern District of Ohio
- Incumbent
- Assumed office November 30, 2004

Chief Judge of the United States District Court for the Southern District of Ohio
- In office 1996–2003
- Preceded by: John David Holschuh
- Succeeded by: James L. Graham

Judge of the United States District Court for the Southern District of Ohio
- In office May 23, 1980 – November 30, 2004
- Appointed by: Jimmy Carter
- Preceded by: Timothy Sylvester Hogan
- Succeeded by: Michael R. Barrett

Personal details
- Born: 1937 (age 88–89) Pittsburgh, Pennsylvania, U.S.
- Children: 4
- Education: Northwestern University (BA); Columbia University (JD–MBA)

Walter Herbert Rice (born 1937) is a senior United States district judge of the United States District Court for the Southern District of Ohio.

== Education and career ==
Rice was born in Pittsburgh. He received a Bachelor of Arts degree from Northwestern University in 1958. He concurrently received a Master of Business Administration from Columbia University and Juris Doctor from Columbia Law School by way of participation in a JD–MBA program from Columbia in 1962. Rice was in private practice in Dayton in 1963 before serving as assistant county prosecutor of Montgomery County, Ohio from 1964 to 1966. Rice resumed private practice in Dayton from 1966 to 1969 and was first assistant county prosecutor of Montgomery County in 1969. Rice was a judge of the Dayton Municipal Court from 1970 to 1971. He was a judge of the Montgomery County Court of Common Pleas from 1971 to 1980. Additionally, Rice has served as an adjunct professor at the University of Dayton School of Law since 1976.

=== Federal judicial service ===
President Jimmy Carter nominated Rice to the United States District Court for the Southern District of Ohio on April 14, 1980, to the seat vacated by Judge Timothy Sylvester Hogan. He was confirmed by the United States Senate on May 21, 1980, and received his commission two days later. Rice served as chief judge from 1996 to 2003 before assuming senior status on November 30, 2004.

== Honor ==
On December 13, 2018, President Donald Trump signed legislation naming the federal building in Dayton the Walter H. Rice Federal Building and United States Courthouse. On September 6, 2019, The Walter H. Rice Federal Building and U.S. Courthouse was officially named at a ceremony, with Rice calling the event and the building's naming "the honor of a lifetime."

== See also ==
- List of United States federal judges by longevity of service

== Sources ==
Legal offices
Preceded by Timothy Sylvester Hogan	Judge of the United States District Court for the Southern District of Ohio; 1980–2004	Succeeded by Michael R. Barrett
Preceded by John David Holschuh	Chief Judge of the United States District Court for the Southern District of Ohio; 1996–2003	Succeeded by James L. Graham
