= James L. Graham =

American judge (born 1939)

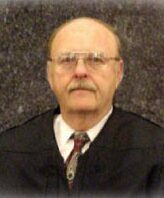

Senior Judge of the United States District Court for the Southern District of Ohio
- Incumbent
- Assumed office August 31, 2004

Chief Judge of the United States District Court for the Southern District of Ohio
- In office 2003–2004
- Preceded by: Walter Herbert Rice
- Succeeded by: Sandra Beckwith

Judge of the United States District Court for the Southern District of Ohio
- In office September 26, 1986 – August 31, 2004
- Appointed by: Ronald Reagan
- Preceded by: Robert Morton Duncan
- Succeeded by: Michael H. Watson

Personal details
- Born: 1939 (age 86–87) Columbus, Ohio, U.S.
- Education: Ohio State University (BA, JD)

James L. Graham (born 1939) is a senior United States district judge of the United States District Court for the Southern District of Ohio.

== Education and career ==
Graham was born in Columbus, Ohio. He received a Bachelor of Arts degree from Ohio State University in 1962 and a Juris Doctor from Ohio State University College of Law that same year. He was thereafter in private practice in Columbus until 1986.

=== Federal judicial service ===
On August 15, 1986, Graham was nominated by President Ronald Reagan to a seat on the United States District Court for the Southern District of Ohio vacated by Judge Robert Morton Duncan. Graham was confirmed by the United States Senate on September 25, 1986, and received his commission the following day. He served as chief judge from 2003 to 2004, assuming senior status on August 31, 2004.

=== Notable case ===
Like many district judges on senior status, Graham occasionally serves with the court of appeals on a rotating basis. While serving with the Sixth Circuit, he supplied a dissenting opinion on a decision upholding the Patient Protection and Affordable Care Act mandate to purchase health insurance.

Legal offices
Preceded by Robert Morton Duncan	Judge of the United States District Court for the Southern District of Ohio; 1986–2004	Succeeded by Michael H. Watson
Preceded by Walter Herbert Rice	Chief Judge of the United States District Court for the Southern District of Ohio; 2003–2004	Succeeded by Sandra Beckwith
