= Howard Clark Hollister =

American judge (1856–1919)

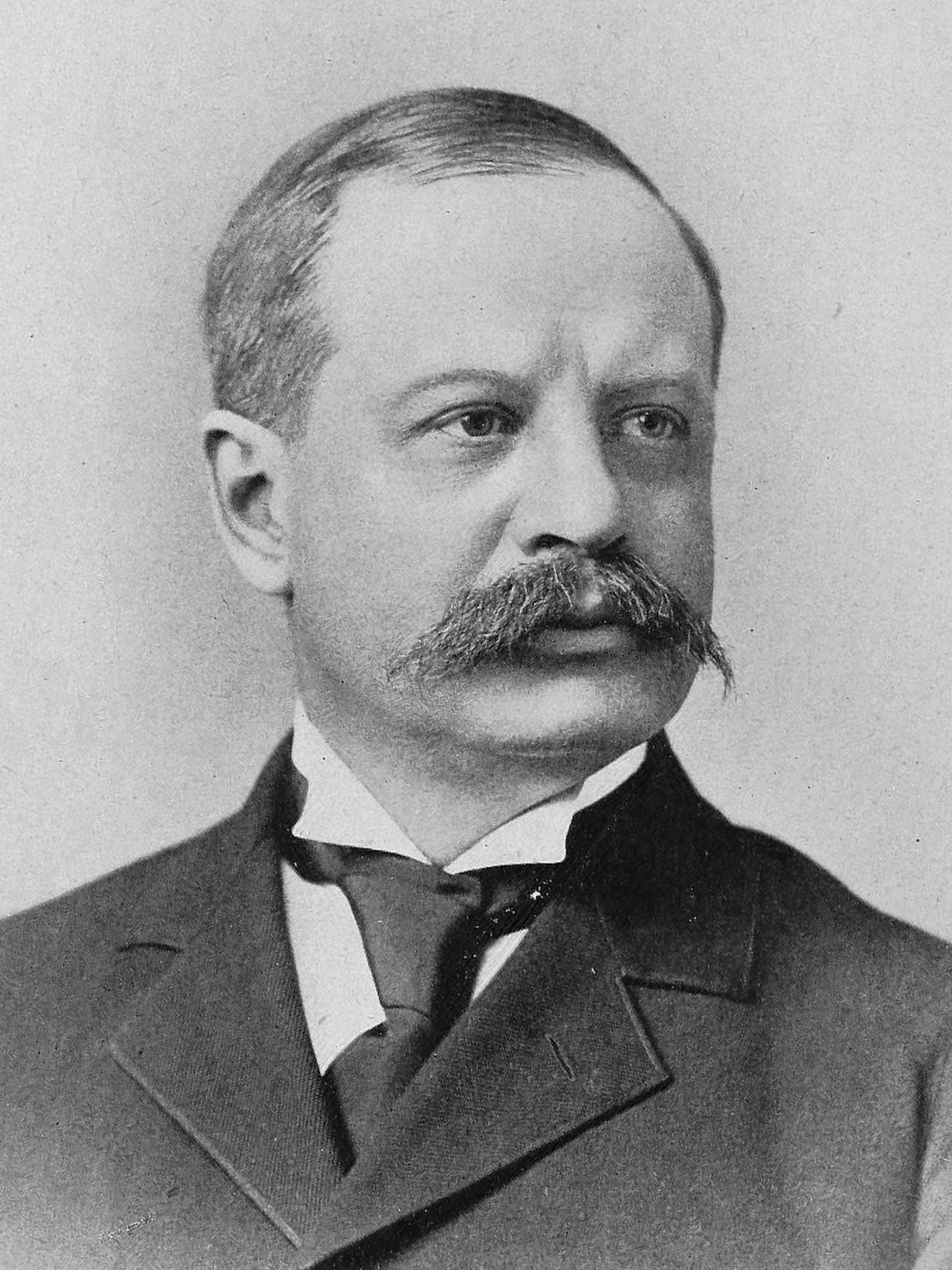
- circa 1897

Judge of the United States District Court for the Southern District of Ohio
- In office March 7, 1910 – September 24, 1919
- Appointed by: William Howard Taft
- Preceded by: Seat established by 36 Stat. 202
- Succeeded by: John Weld Peck

Personal details
- Born: Howard Clark Hollister; September 11, 1856 Cincinnati, Ohio
- Died: September 24, 1919 (aged 63)
- Party: Republican
- Education: Yale University (A.B.); Cincinnati Law School (LL.B.)
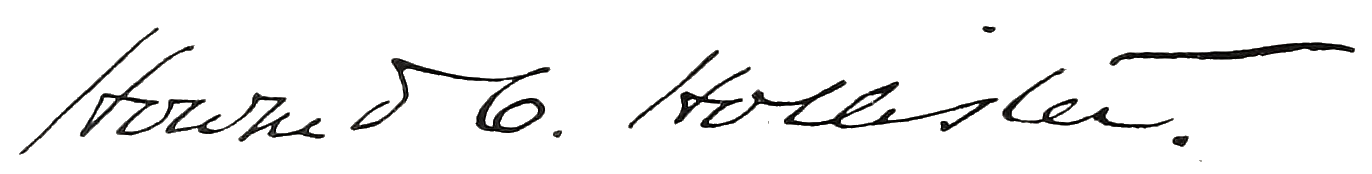
- Signature

Howard Clark Hollister (September 11, 1856 – September 24, 1919) was a United States district judge of the United States District Court for the Southern District of Ohio.

== Education and career ==
Born in Cincinnati, Ohio, Hollister received an Artium Baccalaureus degree from Yale University in 1878 and a Bachelor of Laws from the Cincinnati Law School (now the University of Cincinnati College of Law) in 1880. He was in private practice in Cincinnati from 1880 to 1893, and was an assistant prosecuting attorney of Hamilton County, Ohio from 1881 to 1882. He was a Judge of the Court of Common Pleas for the 1st Judicial District of Ohio from 1893 to 1903.

== Federal judicial service ==
On February 24, 1910, Hollister was nominated by President William Howard Taft to a new seat on the United States District Court for the Southern District of Ohio created by 36 Stat. 202. He was confirmed by the United States Senate on March 7, 1910, and received his commission the same day. Hollister served in that capacity until his death on September 24, 1919.

== Personal ==
Hollister was married to Alice Keys of Cincinnati on June 2, 1887. They had four children. Hollister was a Republican in national politics, but opposed to the local Republican political machine.

== Sources ==
- Media related to Howard Clark Hollister at Wikimedia Commons

Legal offices
Preceded by Seat established by 36 Stat. 202	Judge of the United States District Court for the Southern District of Ohio; 1910–1919	Succeeded by John Weld Peck
