= Stanley M. Chesley =

American lawyer (1936–2025)

- Born: March 26, 1936; Cincinnati, Ohio, U.S.
- Died: November 2, 2025 (aged 89); Cincinnati, Ohio, U.S.
- Education: University of Cincinnati Law School
- Occupation: Lawyer
- Spouse(s): Suellen Kaufman (m. 1959; div. 1981) Susan J. Dlott (m. 1991)
- Children: 2

Stanley Morris Chesley (March 26, 1936 – November 2, 2025) was an American disbarred trial lawyer. He was the husband of federal judge Susan J. Dlott.

== Early life and career ==
Chesley was born in Cincinnati, Ohio, on March 26, 1936, the son of Jewish Ukrainian immigrants, graduated from Walnut Hills High School, the University of Cincinnati and University of Cincinnati Law School. He first came to fame as a plaintiffs' lawyer in litigation arising from the 1977 Beverly Hills Supper Club fire, which killed 165 people (and two unborn infants). Rather than merely sue the nightclub, Chesley sued the entire aluminum electrical wire industry, blaming them for the fire. The aggressive and unprecedented tactic of seeking enterprise liability for an entire industry worked, winning $49 million in verdicts and settlements. Individual defendants settled for about a million dollars in the face of Chesley waving gruesome photos of fire victims rather than risk going to trial and losing much more, though those who did defend themselves often won.

Chesley won billions of dollars for his clients in other mass torts, representing clients suing Pan Am over the Lockerbie terrorist attack and clients suing Dow Corning in controversial breast implant litigation. Chesley was one of the "inner circle" of the plaintiffs' bar that negotiated the controversial $246 billion tobacco settlement on behalf of state governments, and settlements against the Roman Catholic Archdiocese of Cincinnati for sexual abuse.

He was Pro Bono Counsel in the Jewish material claims against German, Austrian, and Swiss financial institutions.

In May 2008, President George W. Bush appointed Chesley to serve on the Honorary Delegation to accompany him to Jerusalem for the celebration of the 60th anniversary of the State of Israel.

Chesley was a Life Board Member of the NAACP and was for five years chairman of the Board of Trustees of the University of Cincinnati.

== Self-dealing ==
Chesley was named in a lawsuit related to the settlement of fen-phen litigation in Kentucky. Former clients sued Chesley and three other plaintiffs' attorneys for allegedly breaching their duties by diverting most of a $200 million settlement fund to themselves with only one third to the plaintiffs. Judge Joseph F. Bamberger approved the settlement, but resigned when it was revealed that he was paid $5000 a month as a director of a charitable entity funded by the settlement and directed by the attorneys. Chesley, who collected a $20.5 million fee for negotiating the settlement, maintained that he was not co-counsel for the plaintiffs and was not aware that the attorneys were deceiving their clients and that he therefore owed no duty to the 440 plaintiffs.

== Disbarment and retirement ==
On February 22, 2011, Kentucky trial commissioner William L. Graham issued an order recommending Chesley be disbarred for his actions. The Kentucky Bar Association's board of governors accepted a trial commissioner's recommendation on June 14, which called for disbarment and restitution of $7.6 million to plaintiffs. It was determined that Chesley violated several ethic rules, namely, "charging unreasonable fees; failing to document his contingency fee arrangement in writing; improperly dividing legal fees with attorneys from different firms; ratifying the misconduct of his co-counsel; representing clients with conflicting interests; making false statements to courts; making false statements in disciplinary proceedings; and general deceit in the distribution of client funds." In the course of seeking to evade judgments against him, Chesley made several below-market transactions to his wife—acts the 6th Circuit described as "red flags."

The Kentucky Supreme Court disbarred Chesley on March 21, 2013, unanimously voting to uphold the 2011 recommendation. Chesley faced disbarment in Ohio due to reciprocal agreements between the two states, but he opted to voluntarily retire from the practice of law in Ohio instead of go through the state's disciplinary process. The practical effect of his retirement in Ohio is the same as if he had been disbarred – Chesley will never be able to practice law in the state again. On November 18, 2013, Chesley was removed from the list of attorneys allowed to practice law before the U.S. Supreme Court.

== Continuing litigation of client funds ==
As of 2017, Chesley was still allegedly trying to shield assets from former clients. In 2013, Chesley transferred $59 million in personal assets to his law firm, and then ostensibly gave up his ownership in the former firm, transferring his shares to a trust overseen by friend and employee Thomas Rehme. U.S. District Judge Robert Cleland oversaw a fraudulent conveyance case brought by former clients, preventing the disposition of Waite Schneider assets. In particular, the judge barred Chesley from receiving any money from the firm. In Kentucky, Boone County Circuit Court Judge James Schrand ordered Chesley in 2015 to transfer his interest in Waite Schneider to former fen-phen clients. Chesley's efforts to block this action through the Ohio courts was stopped by the Supreme Court of Ohio, which stated that Chesley and his former firm were serial abusers of the Ohio judicial process.

In 2018, Chesley's law firm, Waite Schneider Bayless and Chesley, solely owned by Chesley, agreed to pay $23.5 million to former clients, recognizing that there was "unjust enrichment" through the settlement money obtained for clients. This is separate from the legal obligation owed by Chesley himself for $42 million. The federal Sixth Circuit Court of Appeals criticized Chesley's "shell game", wherein he hid assets, sued the former clients and even sued a sheriff to avoid arrest after being found in contempt of court.

== Personal life and death ==
Chesley was married twice, first to Suellen Kaufman from 1959 to 1981, then to Susan J. Dlott in 1991. He had a son and daughter from his first marriage. Chesley died from complications of dementia in Cincinnati on November 2, 2025, at the age of 89.
