= Matthew W. McFarland =

American judge (born 1967)

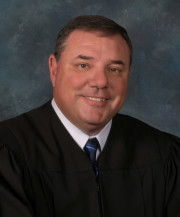

Judge of the United States District Court for the Southern District of Ohio
- Incumbent
- Assumed office December 31, 2019
- Appointed by: Donald Trump
- Preceded by: Thomas M. Rose

Judge of the Ohio Fourth District Court of Appeals
- In office February 9, 2005 – December 31, 2019
- Succeeded by: Kristy Wilkin

Personal details
- Born: Matthew Walden McFarland; 1967 (age 58–59) Portsmouth, Ohio, U.S.
- Education: Capital University (BA, JD)

Matthew Walden McFarland (born 1967) is a United States district judge of the United States District Court for the Southern District of Ohio and former Judge of the Ohio Fourth District Court of Appeals.

== Education ==
McFarland received his Bachelor of Arts, cum laude, from Capital University, and his Juris Doctor from Capital University Law School.

== Career ==
Prior to joining the bench, McFarland was a Scioto County assistant prosecutor and acted as special counsel for the Ohio Attorney General. He was also a Licking County assistant county prosecutor. He previously served as the magistrate in Scioto County Common Pleas Court Probate/Juvenile Division and as chairman of the Ohio Association of Magistrates, Juvenile Section. He is an adjunct professor for Shawnee State University and formerly taught constitutional law at Capital University.

=== Federal judicial service ===
On October 10, 2018, President Donald Trump announced his intent to nominate McFarland to serve as a United States district judge of the United States District Court for the Southern District of Ohio. On November 13, 2018, his nomination was sent to the Senate. President Trump nominated McFarland to the seat vacated by Judge Thomas M. Rose, who assumed senior status on June 30, 2017. On January 3, 2019, his nomination was returned to the president under Rule XXXI, Paragraph 6 of the United States Senate.

On January 23, 2019, President Trump announced his intent to renominate McFarland for a federal judgeship. His nomination was sent to the Senate later that day. On June 26, 2019, a hearing on his nomination was held before the Senate Judiciary Committee. On July 18, 2019, his nomination was reported out of committee by a 12–10 vote. On December 18, 2019, the Senate invoked cloture on his nomination by a 55–38 vote. His nomination was confirmed later that day by a 56–38 vote. He received his judicial commission on December 31, 2019.

=== Notable rulings ===
In July 2022, McFarland ruled that the U.S. Air Force's mandate of COVID-19 vaccinations for its members violated the First Amendment's free exercise clause. Later, the Sixth Circuit Court of Appeals upheld the decision. Not long after McFarland's ruling and the appellate decision upholding it, the U.S. Department of Defense rescinded the mandate for all troops.

== Memberships ==
He has been a member of the Federalist Society since 2017.

Legal offices
Preceded by Thomas M. Rose	Judge of the United States District Court for the Southern District of Ohio; 2019–present	Incumbent
