= Kenneth L. Parker =

American lawyer (born 1972)

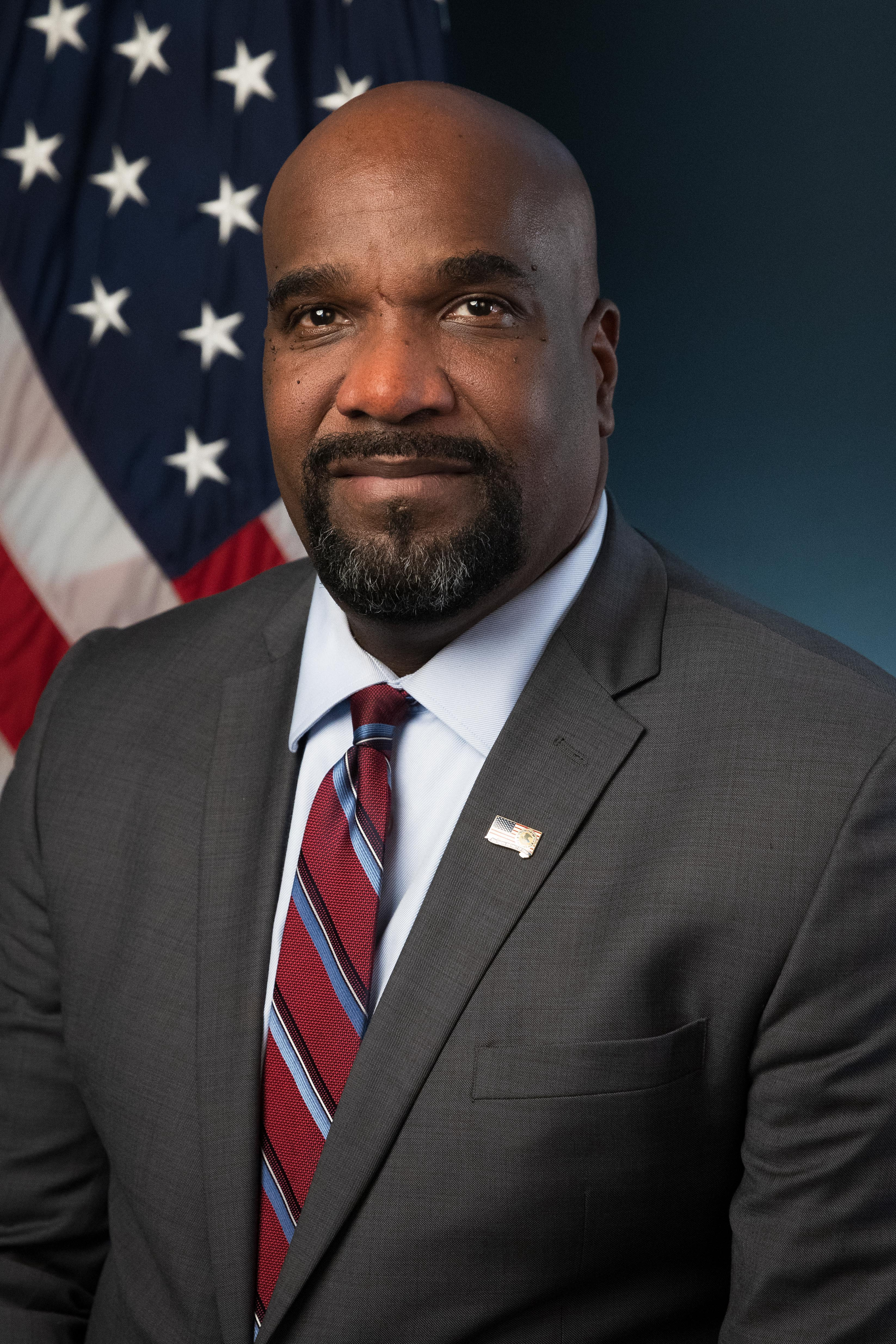

United States Attorney for the Southern District of Ohio
- In office November 23, 2021 – February 18, 2025
- President: Joe Biden; Donald Trump
- Preceded by: David M. DeVillers; Vipal J. Patel (acting)
- Succeeded by: Kelly A. Norris (acting); Dominick Gerace II

Personal details
- Born: Kenneth Lee Parker; 1972 (age 53–54) Cincinnati, Ohio, U.S.
- Education: Tuskegee University (BS); Indiana University (JD)

Kenneth Lee Parker (born 1972) is an American lawyer who served as the United States attorney for the Southern District of Ohio from 2021 to 2025.

== Education ==
Parker received his Bachelor of Science, magna cum laude, from Tuskegee University in 1994 and his Juris Doctor from the Indiana University Maurer School of Law in 1997.

== Career ==
From 1997 to 1999, Parker served as a law clerk for Judge S. Arthur Spiegel of the United States District Court for the Southern District of Ohio. From 2003 to 2005, he served as an adjunct professor of federal criminal practice at the University of Cincinnati College of Law. He served as chief of the criminal division from 2011 to 2019 and as chief of the organized crime drug enforcement task force from 2010 to 2011. From 1999 to 2021, he served as an Assistant United States Attorney in the United States Attorney’s office for the Southern District of Ohio.

=== U.S. attorney for the Southern District of Ohio ===
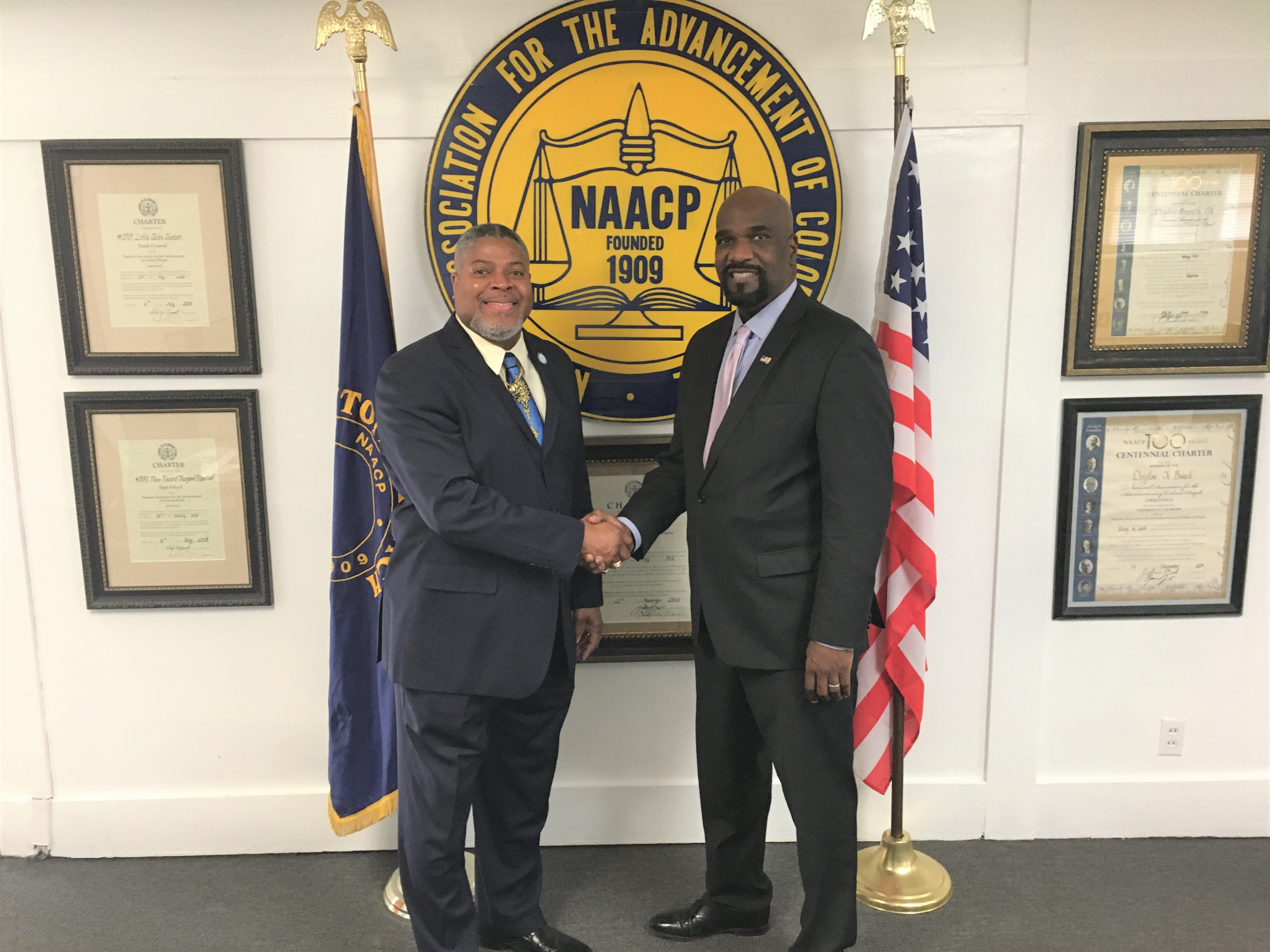
U.S. Attorney Kenneth L. Parker Meets Dayton NAACP President Derrick L. Foward shortly after being confirmed by the U.S. Senate.

On September 28, 2021, President Joe Biden nominated Parker to be the United States Attorney for the Southern District of Ohio. On November 4, 2021, his nomination was reported out of committee by voice vote. Senators Josh Hawley and Marsha Blackburn voted no record. On November 19, 2021, his nomination was confirmed in the United States Senate by voice vote. He was sworn into office on November 23, 2021, replacing Vipal J. Patel, who had been serving as Acting United States Attorney since David M. DeVillers' resignation on February 28, 2021. On February 18, 2025, Parker was fired by the Second Trump administration and replaced by his first assistant Kelly A. Norris.

Legal offices
Preceded by David M. DeVillers; Vipal J. Patel (acting)	United States Attorney for the Southern District of Ohio; 2021–2025	Succeeded by Kelly A. Norris (acting)
