= United States District Court for the Southern District of Ohio =

United States federal district court in Ohio

Coordinates: 39°06′06.8″N 84°30′38.4″W

- (S.D. Ohio)
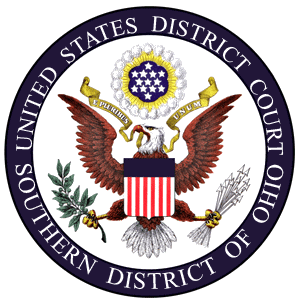

- Location: Joseph P. Kinneary United States Courthouse (Columbus) More locations: Potter Stewart United States Courthouse (Cincinnati); Walter H. Rice Federal Building and United States Courthouse (Dayton)
- Appeals to: Sixth Circuit
- Established: February 10, 1855
- Judges: 8
- Chief Judge: Sarah D. Morrison

Officers of the court
- U.S. Attorney: Dominick Gerace II
- www.ohsd.uscourts.gov

The United States District Court for the Southern District of Ohio (in case citations, S.D. Ohio) is the federal trial court for the southern half of Ohio. The district holds court in Columbus, Cincinnati, and Dayton. The district includes 48 of the state's 88 counties—everything from the Columbus area southward.

Appeals from this court are taken to the United States Court of Appeals for the Sixth Circuit in Cincinnati (except for patent claims and claims against the U.S. government under the Tucker Act, which are appealed to the Federal Circuit). The United States Attorney's Office of the Southern District of Ohio represents the United States in civil and criminal litigation in the court. As of December 2025, the United States attorney is Dominick Gerace II.

== Divisions ==
The court is divided into two divisions.

=== Eastern Division ===
The Eastern Division, which sits in the Joseph P. Kinneary United States Courthouse at Columbus, serves the counties of Athens, Belmont, Coshocton, Delaware, Fairfield, Fayette, Franklin, Gallia, Guernsey, Harrison, Hocking, Jackson, Jefferson, Knox, Licking, Logan, Madison, Meigs, Monroe, Morgan, Morrow, Muskingum, Noble, Perry, Pickaway, Pike, Ross, Union, Vinton, and Washington.

=== Western Division ===
The Western Division sits at both Cincinnati and Dayton. Cases from the counties of Adams, Brown, Butler, Clermont, Clinton, Hamilton, Highland, Lawrence, Scioto, and Warren are heard at Cincinnati in the Potter Stewart United States Courthouse. Cases from the counties of Champaign, Clark, Darke, Greene, Miami, Montgomery, Preble, and Shelby are heard at Dayton.

== History ==
The United States District Court for the District of Ohio was established on February 19, 1803, by 2 Stat. 201. The act of authorized one judgeship for the court. The district court in Ohio, not being assigned to a judicial circuit, was granted the same jurisdiction as U.S. circuit courts, except in appeals and writs of error, which were the jurisdiction of the Supreme Court. By the act of February 24, 1807, 2 Stat. 420, the authority of the Ohio district court to exercise the jurisdiction of a U.S. circuit court was repealed, and Ohio was assigned to the newly organized Seventh Circuit. It also provided for a U.S. circuit court for the District of Ohio. The District was subdivided into Northern and Southern Districts on February 10, 1855, by 10 Stat. 604. The district judge serving the District of Ohio, Humphrey H. Leavitt, was reassigned to the Southern District of Ohio.

On July 23, 1866, by 14 Stat. 209, Congress reorganized the circuits and assigned Ohio to the Sixth Circuit. Additional judgeships were created in 1910, 1937, 1966, 1970, 1978, 1984, and 1990.

== Current judges ==
As of September 30, 2026:

#	Title	Judge	Duty station	Born	Term of service			Appointed by
#	Title	Judge	Duty station	Born	Active	Chief	Senior	Appointed by
37	Chief Judge	Sarah D. Morrison	Columbus	1970	2019–present	2024–present	—	Trump
30	District Judge	Edmund A. Sargus Jr.	Columbus	1953	1996–present	2015–2019	—	Clinton
31	District Judge	Algenon L. Marbley	Columbus	1954	1997–present	2019–2024	—	Clinton
38	District Judge	Douglas R. Cole	Cincinnati; Columbus	1964	2019–present	—	—	Trump
39	District Judge	Matthew W. McFarland	Cincinnati	1967	2019–present	—	—	Trump
40	District Judge	Michael J. Newman	Dayton	1960	2020–present	—	—	Trump
41	District Judge	Jeffery P. Hopkins	Cincinnati	1960	2022–present	—	—	Biden
42	District Judge	Matthew R. Byrne	Cincinnati	1981	2026–present	—	—	Trump
23	Senior Judge	Walter Herbert Rice	Dayton	1937	1980–2004	1996–2003	2004–present	Carter
25	Senior Judge	Herman Jacob Weber	Cincinnati	1927	1985–2002	—	2002–present	Reagan
26	Senior Judge	James L. Graham	Columbus	1939	1986–2004	2003–2004	2004–present	Reagan
28	Senior Judge	Sandra Beckwith	Cincinnati	1943	1992–2009	2004–2009	2009–present	G.H.W. Bush
29	Senior Judge	Susan J. Dlott	Cincinnati	1949	1995–2018	2009–2015	2018–present	Clinton
32	Senior Judge	Thomas M. Rose	Dayton	1948	2002–2017	—	2017–present	G.W. Bush
34	Senior Judge	Michael H. Watson	Columbus	1956	2004–2025	—	2025–present	G.W. Bush
35	Senior Judge	Michael R. Barrett	Cincinnati	1951	2006–2019	—	2019–present	G.W. Bush
36	Senior Judge	Timothy Black	Cincinnati	1953	2010–2022	—	2022–present	Obama

== Former judges ==
#	Judge	Born–died	Active service	Chief Judge	Senior status	Appointed by	Reason for termination
1	Humphrey H. Leavitt	1796–1873	1855–1871 (Note: Reassigned from the District of Ohio.)	—	—	Jackson/Operation of law	retirement
2	Philip Bergen Swing	1820–1882	1871–1882	—	—	Grant	death
3	William White	1822–1883	1883 (Note: White was confirmed and received his commission, but died without taking the oath of office or commencing service.)	—	—	Arthur	death
4	George Read Sage	1828–1898	1883–1898 (Note: Recess appointment; formally nominated on December 18, 1883, confirmed by the United States Senate on January 7, 1884, and received commission the same day.)	—	—	Arthur	retirement
5	Albert C. Thompson	1842–1910	1898–1910 (Note: Recess appointment; formally nominated on December 13, 1898, confirmed by the Senate on December 20, 1898, and received commission the same day.)	—	—	McKinley	death
6	John Elbert Sater	1854–1937	1907–1924 (Note: Recess appointment; formally nominated on December 8, 1908, confirmed by the Senate on March 1, 1909, and received commission the same day.)	—	—	T. Roosevelt	retirement
7	Howard Clark Hollister	1856–1919	1910–1919	—	—	Taft	death
8	John Weld Peck	1874–1937	1919–1923	—	—	Wilson	resignation
9	Smith Hickenlooper	1880–1933	1923–1929	—	—	Harding	elevation
10	Benson W. Hough	1875–1935	1925–1935	—	—	Coolidge	death
11	Robert Reasoner Nevin	1875–1952	1929–1952	1948–1952	—	Coolidge	death
12	Mell G. Underwood	1892–1972	1936–1965	1953–1962	1965–1972	F. Roosevelt	death
13	John H. Druffel	1886–1967	1937–1961 (Note: Recess appointment; formally nominated on November 16, 1937, confirmed by the Senate on December 8, 1937, and received commission on December 14, 1937.)	—	1961–1967	F. Roosevelt	death
14	Lester LeFevre Cecil	1893–1982	1953–1959	—	—	Eisenhower	elevation
15	Carl Andrew Weinman	1903–1979	1959–1973	1962–1973	1973–1979	Eisenhower	death
16	John Weld Peck II	1913–1993	1961–1966 (Note: Recess appointment; formally nominated on January 15, 1962, confirmed by the Senate on April 11, 1962, and received commission on April 12, 1962.)	—	—	Kennedy	elevation
17	Joseph Peter Kinneary	1905–2003	1966–1986	1973–1975	1986–2003	L. Johnson	death
18	Timothy Sylvester Hogan	1909–1989	1966–1979	1975–1977	1979–1989	L. Johnson	death
19	David Stewart Porter	1909–1989	1966–1979	1977–1979	1979–1989	L. Johnson	death
20	Carl Bernard Rubin	1920–1995	1971–1995	1979–1990	—	Nixon	death
21	Robert Morton Duncan	1927–2012	1974–1985	—	—	Nixon	resignation
22	John David Holschuh	1926–2011	1980–1996	1990–1996	1996–2011	Carter	death
24	S. Arthur Spiegel	1920–2014	1980–1995	—	1995–2014	Carter	death
27	George Curtis Smith	1935–2020	1987–2002	—	2002–2020	Reagan	death
33	Gregory L. Frost	1949–present	2003–2016	—	—	G.W. Bush	retirement

== Chief judges ==
Chief judges have administrative responsibilities with respect to their district court. Unlike the Supreme Court, where one justice is specifically nominated to be chief, the office of chief judge rotates among the district court judges. To be chief, a judge must have been in active service on the court for at least one year, be under the age of 65, and have not previously served as chief judge.

A vacancy is filled by the judge highest in seniority among the group of qualified judges. The chief judge serves for a term of seven years, or until age 70, whichever occurs first. The age restrictions are waived if no members of the court would otherwise be qualified for the position.

When the office was created in 1948, the chief judge was the longest-serving judge who had not elected to retire, on what has since 1958 been known as senior status, or declined to serve as chief judge. After August 6, 1959, judges could not become or remain chief after turning 70 years old. The current rules have been in operation since October 1, 1982.

== Succession of seats ==
Seat 1
Seat reassigned from District of Ohio on February 10, 1855 by 10 Stat. 604
Leavitt	1855–1871
Swing	1871–1882
White	1883
Sage	1883–1898
Thompson	1898–1910
Seat abolished on January 26, 1910 (temporary judgeship expired)

Seat 2
Seat established on February 25, 1907 by 34 Stat. 928 (temporary)
Seat became permanent upon the abolition of Seat 1 on January 26, 1910
Sater	1909–1924
Hough	1925–1935
Underwood	1936–1965
Kinneary	1966–1986
Smith	1987–2002
Frost	2003–2016
Morrison	2019–present

Seat 3
Seat established on February 24, 1910 by 36 Stat. 202
Hollister	1910–1919
Peck	1919–1923
Hickenlooper	1923–1927
Nevin	1929–1952
Cecil	1953–1959
Weinman	1959–1973
Duncan	1974–1985
Graham	1986–2004
Watson	2004–2025
Byrne	2026–present

Seat 4
Seat established on August 25, 1937 by 50 Stat. 805
Druffel	1937–1961
Seat abolished on September 30, 1961 (temporary judgeship expired)

Seat 5
Seat established on May 19, 1961 by 75 Stat. 80 (temporary)
Seat became permanent upon the abolition of Seat 4 on September 30, 1961
Peck II	1961–1966
Hogan	1966–1979
Rice	1980–2004
Barrett	2006–2019
Newman	2020–present

Seat 6
Seat established on March 18, 1966 by 80 Stat. 75
Porter	1966–1979
Spiegel	1980–1995
Dlott	1995–2018
Cole	2019–present

Seat 7
Seat established on June 2, 1970 by 84 Stat. 294
Rubin	1971–1995
Sargus, Jr.	1996–present

Seat 8
Seat established on October 20, 1978 by 92 Stat. 1629
Holschuh	1980–1996
Marbley	1997–present

Seat 9
Seat established on July 10, 1984 by 98 Stat. 347
Weber	1985–2002
Rose	2002–2017
McFarland	2019–present

Seat 10
Seat established on December 1, 1990 by 104 Stat. 5089
Beckwith	1992–2009
Black	2010–2022
Hopkins	2022–present

== United States attorneys ==
Term start	Term end	United States Attorney
1855	1856	Hugh J. Jewett
1856	1858	John O'Neill
1858	1861	Stanley Matthews
1861	1865	Flamen Ball
1865	1866	Richard Corwine
1866	1869	Durbin Ward
1869	1877	Warner Bateman
1877	1885	Channing Richards
1885	1887	Philip Kumler
1887	1889	William Burnet
1889	1894	John Herron
1894	1898	Harlan Cleveland
1898	1903	William Bundy
1903	1916	Sherman McPherson
1916	1920	Stuart Bolin
1920	1922	James Clark
1922	1923	Thomas Morrow
1923	1925	Benson W. Hough
1925	1934	Haveth Mau
1934	1939	Francis Canny
1939	1939	James Cleveland
1939	1944	Leo Crawford
1944	1946	Byron B. Harlan
1946	1953	Ray O'Donnell
1953	1961	Hugh Martin
1961	1966	Joseph Peter Kinneary
1966	1969	Robert Draper
1969	1969	Roger Makley
1969	1977	William Milligan
1977	1978	James Rattan
1978	1982	James Cissell
1982	1985	Christopher Barnes
1985	1986	Anthony Nyktas
1986	1993	Michael Crites
1993	1993	Barbara Beran
1993	1996	Edmund A. Sargus Jr.
1996	1997	Dale Goldberg
1997	2001	Sharon Zealey
2001	2001	Salvador Dominguez
2001	2009	Gregory Lockhart
2009	2016	Carter M. Stewart
2016	2019	Benjamin C. Glassman (Acting)
2019	2021	David M. DeVillers
2021	2021	Vipal J. Patel (Acting)
2021	2025	Kenneth L. Parker
2025	2025	Kelly A. Norris (Acting)
2025		Dominick Gerace II

== See also ==
- Courts of Ohio
- List of current United States district judges
- List of United States federal courthouses in Ohio
- United States District Court for the Northern District of Ohio
- United States federal judicial district
