= Edmund A. Sargus =

American politician

Edmund A. Sargus, Sr. (June 27, 1911 – March 4, 1967) was an Ohio senator.

== Biography ==
He was born in Bellaire, Ohio on June 27, 1911, the son of Emily and Frank Sargus, both immigrants from Lebanon. Sargus was educated at the University of Notre Dame, where he received his undergraduate degree in 1932 and his law degree in 1950.

Sargus was elected to the Ohio Senate in 1960 and served through 1966. He was coauthor of a number of bills enacted into law, including a requirement that all new cars sold in Ohio include seat belts. He also championed the effort to require coal mining companies engaged in surface or strip mining to restore the land disturbed by these activities. Sargus was elected probate and juvenile judge of Belmont County, Ohio in 1966. After only four weeks in this position he died of a heart attack on March 4, 1967.

Because of his concern for juveniles, a multi-county juvenile detention facility located in St. Clairsville, Ohio was named in his honor. Sargus married Anne Elizabeth Kearney in 1946. The two met while Sargus was stationed in Newport, Rhode Island during World War II. Sargus attained the rank of Lieutenant Commander during his service. The couple had three children, Anne (Varian), a professor at the University of Akron, Joan (Donald) a guidance counsellor in the Northern Local School District in Perry County, Ohio and Edmund A. Sargus, Jr., who is a United States District Judge for the Southern District of Ohio and is married to Jennifer Sargus, who is a judge of the Belmont County Court of Common Pleas in St. Clairsville, Ohio.
