= Algenon L. Marbley =

American judge (born 1954)

Algenon Marbley
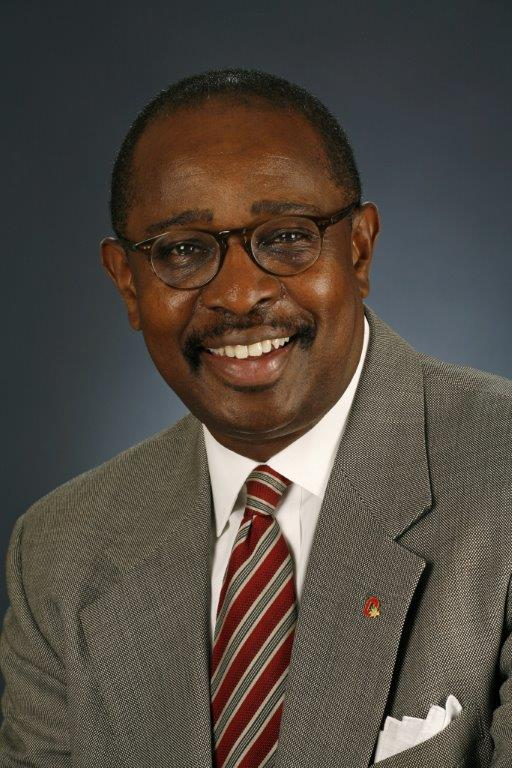

Chief Judge of the United States District Court for the Southern District of Ohio
- In office September 16, 2019 – September 7. 2024
- Preceded by: Edmund A. Sargus Jr.
- Succeeded by: Sarah D. Morrison

Judge of the United States District Court for the Southern District of Ohio
- Incumbent
- Assumed office November 7, 1997
- Appointed by: Bill Clinton
- Preceded by: John David Holschuh

Personal details
- Born: 1954 (age 71–72) Morehead City, North Carolina, U.S.
- Party: Democratic
- Education: University of North Carolina, Chapel Hill (BA); Northwestern University (JD)

Algenon Lamont Marbley (born 1954) is a United States district judge of the United States District Court for the Southern District of Ohio.

== Education and career ==
Born in Morehead City, North Carolina, Marbley received a Bachelor of Arts degree from the University of North Carolina at Chapel Hill in 1976 and a Juris Doctor from the Northwestern University School of Law in 1979. He was in private practice of law in Chicago, Illinois from 1979 to 1980. He was an assistant regional attorney of the United States Department of Health and Human Services from 1980 to 1986, returning to private practice in Columbus, Ohio, from 1986 to 1997 with Vorys, Sater, Seymour and Pease LLP.

=== Federal judicial service ===
On July 31, 1997, Marbley was nominated by President Bill Clinton to a seat on the United States District Court for the Southern District of Ohio vacated by Judge John David Holschuh. Marbley was confirmed by the United States Senate on October 27, 1997, and received his commission on November 7, 1997. He served as chief judge between September 16, 2019 and September 7, 2024.

On October 23, 2023, Marbley announced his intent to take senior status upon the confirmation of his successor. On November 8, 2024, Marbley reversed his decision to take senior status, citing the fact that no successor had been confirmed.

On April 25, 2024, Judge Marbley was inducted into The Ohio State University's Office of Diversity and Inclusion Hall of Fame. The Hall of Fame recognizes those who have made a lasting impact on The Ohio State University and society and has shown a lifelong commitment to justice, inclusion and diversity.

== See also ==
- List of African-American federal judges
- List of African-American jurists

== Sources ==
Legal offices
Preceded by John David Holschuh	Judge of the United States District Court for the Southern District of Ohio; 1997–present	Incumbent
Preceded by Edmund A. Sargus Jr.	Chief Judge of the United States District Court for the Southern District of Ohio; 2019–2024	Succeeded by Sarah D. Morrison
