= John David Holschuh =

American judge

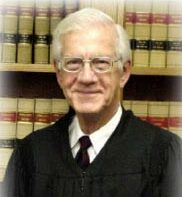

Senior Judge of the United States District Court for the Southern District of Ohio
- In office October 12, 1996 – January 26, 2011

Chief Judge of the United States District Court for the Southern District of Ohio
- In office 1990–1996
- Preceded by: Carl Bernard Rubin
- Succeeded by: Walter Herbert Rice

Judge of the United States District Court for the Southern District of Ohio
- In office May 23, 1980 – October 12, 1996
- Appointed by: Jimmy Carter
- Preceded by: Seat established by 92 Stat. 1629
- Succeeded by: Algenon L. Marbley

Personal details
- Born: John David Holschuh; October 12, 1926 Ironton, Ohio
- Died: January 26, 2011 (aged 84) Columbus, Ohio
- Education: Miami University (BA); University of Cincinnati College of Law (JD)

John David Holschuh (October 12, 1926 – January 26, 2011) was a United States district judge of the United States District Court for the Southern District of Ohio.

== Education and career ==
Born in Ironton, Ohio, Holschuh received a Bachelor of Arts degree from Miami University in 1948 and a Juris Doctor from the University of Cincinnati College of Law in 1951. He was in private practice in Columbus, Ohio from 1951 to 1952. He was a law clerk for Judge Mell G. Underwood of the United States District Court for the Northern District of Ohio from 1952 to 1954. He was in private practice in Columbus from 1954 to 1980. He was an adjunct professor of law at the Ohio State University Moritz College of Law from 1970 to 1977.

== Federal judicial service ==
On March 28, 1980, Holschuh was nominated by President Jimmy Carter to a new seat on the United States District Court for the Southern District of Ohio created by 92 Stat. 1629. He was confirmed by the United States Senate on May 21, 1980, and received his commission on May 23, 1980. He served as Chief Judge from 1990 to 1996, assuming senior status on October 12, 1996. He continued hearing cases until just two months before his death on January 26, 2011, in Columbus.

== Sources ==
- Kathy Lynn Gray, Revered federal judge was a model for others, The Columbus Dispatch (January 27, 2011).

Legal offices
Preceded by Seat established by 92 Stat. 1629	Judge of the United States District Court for the Southern District of Ohio; 1980–1996	Succeeded by Algenon L. Marbley
Preceded by Carl Bernard Rubin	Chief Judge of the United States District Court for the Southern District of Ohio; 1990–1996	Succeeded by Walter Herbert Rice
