= John Elbert Sater =

American judge (1854–1937)

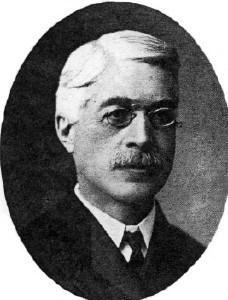

Judge of the United States District Court for the Southern District of Ohio
- In office May 30, 1908 – November 18, 1924
- Appointed by: Theodore Roosevelt
- Preceded by: himself
- Succeeded by: Benson W. Hough

Judge of the United States District Court for the Southern District of Ohio
- In office March 18, 1907 – May 30, 1908
- Appointed by: Theodore Roosevelt
- Preceded by: Seat established by 34 Stat. 928
- Succeeded by: himself

Personal details
- Born: John Elbert Sater; January 16, 1854 New Haven, Hamilton County, Ohio, U.S.
- Died: July 18, 1937 (aged 83)
- Education: Marietta College (A.B., A.M.) read law

John Elbert Sater (January 16, 1854 – July 18, 1937) was a United States district judge of the United States District Court for the Southern District of Ohio.

== Education and career ==
Born near New Haven, Hamilton County, Ohio, Sater entered Miami University in 1871, then transferred to and received an Artium Baccalaureus degree from Marietta College in 1875 and an Artium Magister degree from the same institution in 1878. He read law to enter the bar in 1884. He received Legum Doctor degrees from Marietta College in 1910 and from Miami University in 1911.

Sater was the Superintendent of Schools of Wauseon, Ohio from 1875 to 1881, also serving as a county school examiner for that jurisdiction. He was the chief clerk of the Office of State Commissioner of Common Schools from 1881 to 1884, and a member of the Board of Education in Columbus, Ohio from 1885 to 1890, serving as its President from 1888 to 1889. He went into private practice in Columbus starting in 1884, and returned to private practice after retirement as a federal judge in 1924.

== Federal judicial service ==
Sater received a recess appointment from President Theodore Roosevelt on March 18, 1907, to the United States District Court for the Southern District of Ohio, to a new seat authorized by 34 Stat. 928. He was nominated to the same position by President Roosevelt on December 3, 1907. His service terminated on May 30, 1908, after his nomination was not confirmed by the United States Senate, which never held a vote. Sater received a second recess appointment from President Roosevelt on May 30, 1908, to the same position. He was nominated to the same position by President Roosevelt on December 8, 1908. He was confirmed by the Senate on March 1, 1909, and received his commission the same day. His service terminated on November 18, 1924, due to his retirement.

== Sources ==
Legal offices
Preceded by Seat established by 34 Stat. 928	Judge of the United States District Court for the Southern District of Ohio; 1907–1908	Succeeded by himself
Preceded by himself	Judge of the United States District Court for the Southern District of Ohio; 1908–1924	Succeeded by Benson W. Hough
