= Carter M. Stewart =

American attorney (born 1969)

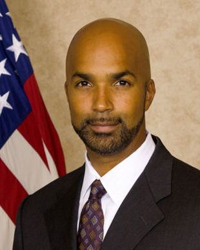

United States Attorney for the Southern District of Ohio
- In office September 30, 2009 – March 11, 2016
- President: Barack Obama
- Preceded by: Gregory Lockhart
- Succeeded by: Benjamin C. Glassman (acting)

Personal details
- Born: April 11, 1969 (age 56)
- Party: Democratic

Carter M. Stewart (born April 11, 1969) is an American attorney who served as the United States Attorney for the Southern District of Ohio from 2009 to 2016.

He graduated from Stanford University, Columbia University, and Harvard Law School. He also teaches at the Moritz College of Law.
