= Edmund A. Sargus Jr. =

American judge (born 1953)

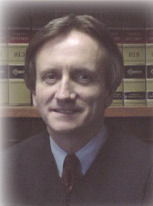

Chief Judge of the United States District Court for the Southern District of Ohio
- In office January 1, 2015 – September 16, 2019
- Preceded by: Susan J. Dlott
- Succeeded by: Algenon L. Marbley

Judge of the United States District Court for the Southern District of Ohio
- Incumbent
- Assumed office August 1, 1996
- Appointed by: Bill Clinton
- Preceded by: Carl Bernard Rubin

Personal details
- Born: Edmund Albert Sargus Jr. July 2, 1953 (age 73) Wheeling, West Virginia, U.S.
- Education: Brown University (AB); Case Western Reserve University (JD)

Edmund Albert Sargus Jr. (born July 2, 1953) is a United States district judge of the United States District Court for the Southern District of Ohio.

== Education and career ==
Sargus was born in Wheeling, West Virginia. He received an Artium Baccalaureus degree from Brown University in 1975 and a Juris Doctor from Case Western Reserve University School of Law in 1978. He was in private practice in Bellaire, Ohio and St. Clairsville, Ohio, in Belmont County from 1978 to 1993. Sargus served as the solicitor for a number of municipalities, including Bellaire, Powhatan Point, and Bethesda, and was a member of the City Council of St. Clairsville, Ohio from 1988 to 1991. He also served as Special Counsel to the Ohio Attorney General from 1979 through May 1993.

On May 23, 1993, Sargus became the United States attorney for the Southern District of Ohio. In this role, he headed the office which prosecuted all federal crimes in the district, which includes the cities of Columbus, Cincinnati and Dayton. Notable cases included the prosecution of a large Columbus-based gang known as the Short North Posse, indictment and conviction of Barry Kessler on charges of interstate murder for hire, and the conviction of Herbert Steinler of defrauding the United States in conjunction of the sale of F-16 jets to Israel.

=== Federal judicial service ===
On December 22, 1995, Sargus was nominated by President Bill Clinton to a seat on the United States District Court for the Southern District of Ohio vacated by Carl Bernard Rubin. Sargus was confirmed by the United States Senate on July 22, 1996, and received his commission on August 1, 1996. The district includes 48 of Ohio's 88 counties. Notable matters which he has handled include several major Clean Air Act cases brought by the United States government and several states against Ohio utilities regarding emissions from coal-burning power plants. He served as Chief Judge from January 1, 2015 to September 16, 2019.

== Personal life ==
Sargus resides in St. Clairsville and sits in Columbus, Ohio. His wife, Jennifer Sargus, was a Judge of the Belmont County Court of Common Pleas. The couple has two children, Edmund 3rd and Christopher. Sargus' father, Edmund A. Sargus, was an Ohio state senator and Probate and Juvenile Judge of Belmont County, Ohio.

Since 2005, Sargus has taught trial practice and a seminar in evidence in trial practice at the Ohio State University Moritz College of Law.

== Sources ==
Legal offices
Preceded by Carl Bernard Rubin	Judge of the United States District Court for the Southern District of Ohio; 1996–present	Incumbent
Preceded by Susan J. Dlott	Chief Judge of the United States District Court for the Southern District of Ohio; 2015–2019	Succeeded by Algenon L. Marbley
