= Benson W. Hough =

American judge

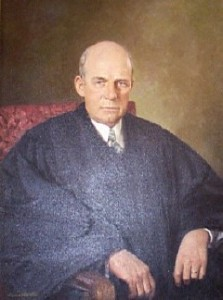
- Hough's court portrait by Lucian L. Breton

Judge of the United States District Court for the Southern District of Ohio
- In office February 9, 1925 – November 19, 1935
- Appointed by: Calvin Coolidge
- Preceded by: John Elbert Sater
- Succeeded by: Mell G. Underwood

Associate Justice of the Ohio Supreme Court
- In office December 7, 1920 – December 31, 1922
- Preceded by: Coleman W. Avery
- Succeeded by: Florence E. Allen

Personal details
- Born: Benson Walker Hough; March 5, 1875 Berkshire Township, Ohio, U.S.
- Died: November 19, 1935 (aged 60) Columbus, Ohio, U.S.
- Resting place: Berkshire Township, Ohio
- Education: Ohio Wesleyan University (M.A.); Ohio State University Moritz College of Law (LL.B.)

Benson Walker Hough (March 5, 1875 – November 19, 1935) was a United States district judge of the United States District Court for the Southern District of Ohio.

== Education and career ==
Born in Berkshire Township, Delaware County, Ohio, Hough received a Master of Arts degree from Ohio Wesleyan University in 1897 and a Bachelor of Laws from the Ohio State University Moritz College of Law in 1899. He entered private practice in Delaware, Ohio from 1900 to 1916. He was the Adjutant General of Ohio from 1915 to 1916, serving in the United States Army during World War I from 1917 to 1919. He voluntarily requested a demotion from General to Colonel in order to accompany the 4th Ohio Infantry, renamed the 166th US Infantry, and incorporated into the 42nd Infantry Division, to France. Hough was elected as a justice of the Supreme Court of Ohio, serving from 1920 to 1923. He was the United States Attorney for the Southern District of Ohio from 1923 to 1925.

== Federal judicial service ==
Hough was nominated by President Calvin Coolidge on January 31, 1925, to a seat on the United States District Court for the Southern District of Ohio vacated by Judge John Elbert Sater. He was confirmed by the United States Senate on February 9, 1925, and received his commission the same day. His service terminated on November 19, 1935, due to his death at a hospital in Columbus, Ohio. He was interred in Berkshire Township.

== Personal ==
Hough was married to Edith Markel on June 25, 1902, and had one child.

== Sources ==
Legal offices
Preceded by John Elbert Sater	Judge of the United States District Court for the Southern District of Ohio; 1925–1935	Succeeded by Mell G. Underwood
