= Electoral history of Warren G. Harding =

List of elections featuring Warren G. Harding as a candidate

Electoral history of Warren G. Harding, who served as the 29th president of the United States (1921-1923); a U.S. senator from Ohio (1915-1921); and the 28th lieutenant governor of Ohio (1904-1906).

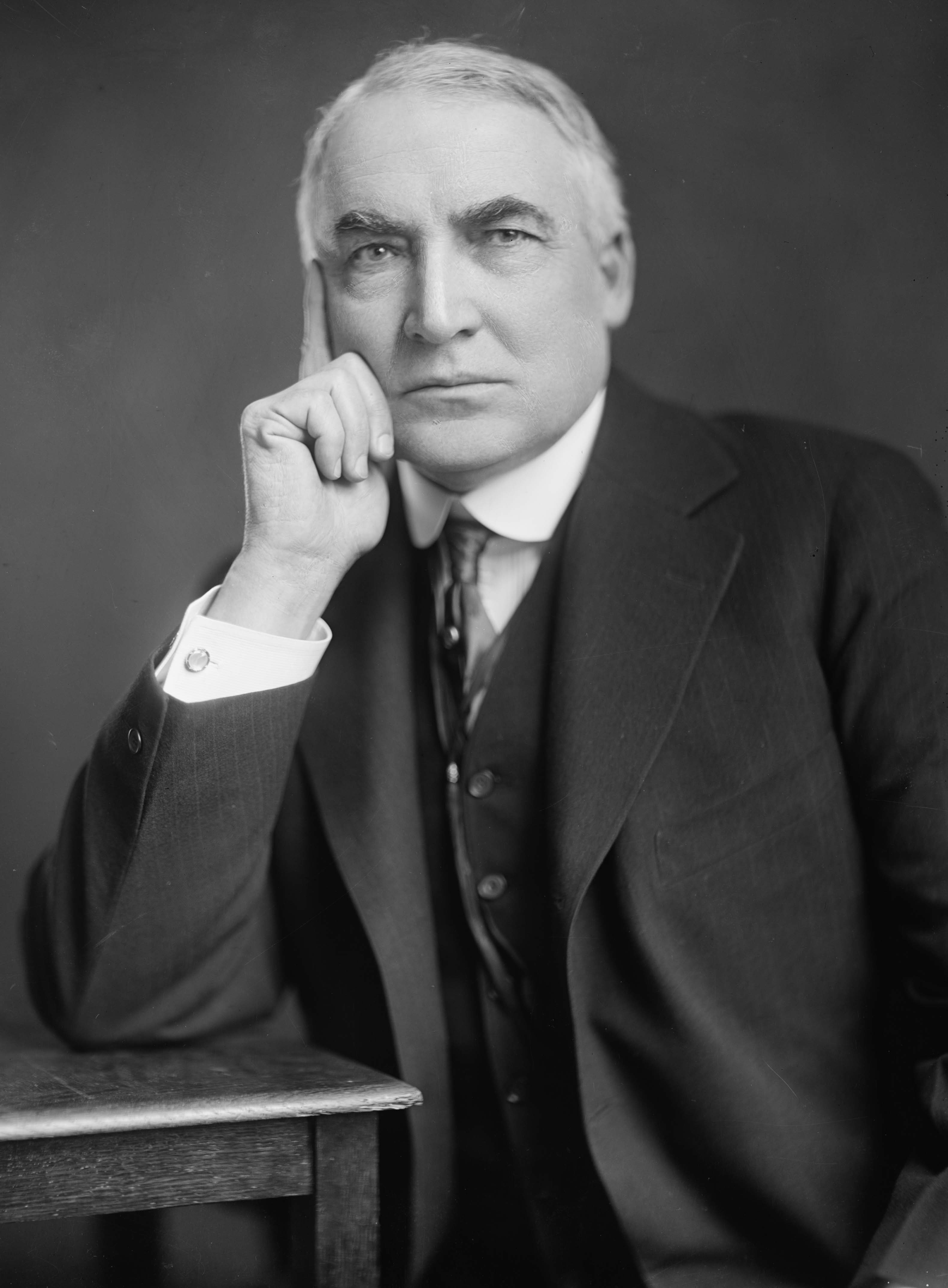
President Warren G. Harding

== Ohio gubernatorial races (1903-1910) ==
1903 Ohio gubernatorial election
| Party | Candidate | Votes | % |
|---|---|---|---|
| Republican | Myron T. Herrick / Warren G. Harding | 475,560 | 54.89% |
| Democratic | Tom L. Johnson / Frank B. Niles | 361,748 | 41.76% |
| Total votes | | 113,812 | 96.65% |

1910 Ohio gubernatorial election
| Party | Candidate | Votes | % |
|---|---|---|---|
| Democratic | Judson Harmon | 477,077 | 51.61% |
| Republican | Warren Gamaliel Harding | 376,700 | 40.75% |
| Socialist | Tom Clifford | 60,637 | 6.56% |
| Total votes | | 90,328 | 99.01% |

== United States Senate election (1914) ==
Ohio United States Senate Republican Primary, 1914
| Party | Candidate | Votes | % |
|---|---|---|---|
| Republican | Warren G. Harding | 88,540 | 40.69% |
| Republican | Joseph B. Foraker | 76,817 | 35.30% |
| Republican | Ralph D. Cole | 52,237 | 24.01% |
| Total votes | | 217,594 | 100% |

Ohio United States Senate election, 1914
| Party | Candidate | Votes | % |
|---|---|---|---|
| Republican | Warren G. Harding | 526,115 | 49.16% |
| Democratic | Timothy S. Hogan | 423,742 | 39.60% |
| Progressive | Arthur L. Garford | 67,509 | 6.31% |
| Socialist | E.K. Hitchens | 52,803 | 4.93% |
| Total votes | | 1,070,169 | 100% |
| Republican hold | | | |

== Presidential elections (1916-1920) ==
=== 1916 Republican National Convention ===
| Ballot | 1 | 2 | 3 |
| Charles Evans Hughes | 253.5 | 328.5 | 949.5 |
| John W. Weeks | 105 | 79 | 3 |
| Elihu Root | 103 | 98.5 | 0 |
| Charles W. Fairbanks | 74.5 | 88.5 | 0 |
| Albert B. Cummins | 85 | 85 | 0 |
| Theodore Roosevelt | 65 | 81 | 18.5 |
| Theodore E. Burton | 77.5 | 76.5 | 0 |
| Lawrence Yates Sherman | 66 | 65 | 0 |
| Philander C. Knox | 36 | 36 | 0 |
| Henry Ford | 32 | 0 | 0 |
| Martin Grove Brumbaugh | 29 | 0 | 0 |
| Robert M. La Follette | 25 | 25 | 3 |
| William Howard Taft | 14 | 0 | 0 |
| T. Coleman du Pont | 12 | 13 | 5 |
| Henry Cabot Lodge | 0 | 0 | 7 |
| John Wanamaker | 0 | 5 | 0 |
| Frank B. Willis | 4 | 1 | 0 |
| William Borah | 2 | 0 | 0 |
| Warren G. Harding | 0 | 1 | 0 |
| Samuel W. McCall | 1 | 1 | 0 |
| Leonard Wood | 0 | 1 | 0 |
| Absent | 2.5 | 2 | 1 |

Source -

=== 1920 United States presidential election ===
==== 1920 Republican National Convention ====
1920 Republican presidential balloting
| Ballot | 1 | 2 | 3 | 4 | 5 | 6 | 7 | 8 | 9 | 10 (Note: before shifts) | 10 (Note: after shifts) |
|---|---|---|---|---|---|---|---|---|---|---|---|
| Harding | 65.5 | 59.0 | 58.5 | 61.5 | 78.0 | 89.0 | 105.0 | 133.0 | 374.5 | 644.7 | 692.2 |
| Wood | 287.5 | 289.5 | 303.0 | 314.5 | 299.0 | 311.5 | 312.0 | 299.0 | 249.0 | 181.5 | 156.0 |
| Lowden | 211.5 | 259.5 | 282.5 | 289.0 | 303.0 | 311.5 | 311.5 | 307.0 | 121.5 | 28.0 | 11.0 |
| H. Johnson | 133.5 | 146.0 | 148.0 | 140.5 | 133.5 | 110.0 | 99.5 | 87.0 | 82.0 | 80.8 | 80.8 |
| Sproul | 84.0 | 78.5 | 79.5 | 79.5 | 82.5 | 77.0 | 76.0 | 76.0 | 78.0 | 0 | 0 |
| W.M. Butler | 69.5 | 41.0 | 25.0 | 20.0 | 4.0 | 4.0 | 2.0 | 2.0 | 2.0 | 2.0 | 2.0 |
| Coolidge | 34.0 | 32.0 | 27.0 | 25.0 | 29.0 | 28.0 | 28.0 | 30.0 | 28.0 | 5.0 | 5.0 |
| La Follette | 24.0 | 24.0 | 24.0 | 22.0 | 24.0 | 24.0 | 24.0 | 24.0 | 24.0 | 24.0 | 24.0 |
| Pritchard | 21.0 | 10.0 | 0 | 0 | 0 | 0 | 0 | 0 | 0 | 0 | 0 |
| Poindexter | 20.0 | 15.0 | 15.0 | 15.0 | 15.0 | 15.0 | 15.0 | 15.0 | 14.0 | 2.0 | 0 |
| Sutherland | 17.0 | 15.0 | 9.0 | 3.0 | 1.0 | 0 | 0 | 0 | 0 | 0 | 0 |
| Hoover | 5.5 | 5.5 | 5.5 | 5.0 | 6.0 | 5.0 | 4.0 | 5.0 | 6.0 | 10.5 | 9.5 |
| Scattering | 11.0 | 9.0 | 7.0 | 9.0 | 9.0 | 9.0 | 6.0 | 6.0 | 5.0 | 5.5 | 3.5 |

First Presidential Ballot

Second Presidential Ballot

Third Presidential Ballot

Fourth Presidential Ballot

Fifth Presidential Ballot

Sixth Presidential Ballot

Seventh Presidential Ballot

Eighth Presidential Ballot

Ninth Presidential Ballot

Tenth Presidential Ballot
Before Shifts

Tenth Presidential Ballot
After Shifts

==== Presidential election ====
1920 Presidential election electoral college result.

Electoral results
| Presidential candidate | Party | Home state | Popular vote | | Electoral vote | Running mate | | |
| Presidential candidate | Party | Home state | Count | Percentage | Electoral vote | Vice-presidential candidate | Home state | Electoral vote |
|---|---|---|---|---|---|---|---|---|
| Warren Gamaliel Harding | Republican | Ohio | 16,144,093 | 60.32% | 404 | John Calvin Coolidge Jr. | Massachusetts | 404 |
| James Middleton Cox | Democratic | Ohio | 9,139,661 | 34.15% | 127 | Franklin Delano Roosevelt | New York | 127 |
| Eugene Victor Debs | Socialist | Indiana | 913,693 | 3.41% | 0 | Seymour Stedman | Illinois | 0 |
| Parley Parker Christensen | Farmer-Labor | Illinois | 265,398 | 0.99% | 0 | Maximillian S. Hayes | Ohio | 0 |
| Aaron Sherman Watkins | Prohibition | Indiana | 188,787 | 0.71% | 0 | David Leigh Colvin | New York | 0 |
| James Edward Ferguson Jr. | American | Texas | 47,968 | 0.18% | 0 | William J. Hough | New York | 0 |
| William Wesley Cox | Socialist Labor | Missouri | 31,084 | 0.12% | 0 | August Gillhaus | New York | 0 |
| Robert Colvin Macauley | Single Tax | Pennsylvania | 5,750 | 0.02% | 0 | Richard C. Barnum | Ohio | 0 |
| Other | | | 28,746 | 0.11% | — | Other | | — |
| Total | | | 26,765,180 | 100% | 531 | | | 531 |
| Needed to win | | | | | 266 | | | 266 |

== Sources and references ==
Work cited

- Guide to U.S. Elections. SAGE Publications. 2010. ISBN 978-1-60426-536-1.
