= Timothy Hogan =

Timothy Hogan may refer to:

- Timothy Sylvester Hogan (judge) (1909–1989), United States federal judge
- Timothy Sylvester Hogan (politician) (1864–1926), Attorney General for the state of Ohio from 1911 to 1915
