= Studebaker-Garford =

Defunct American motor vehicle manufacturer

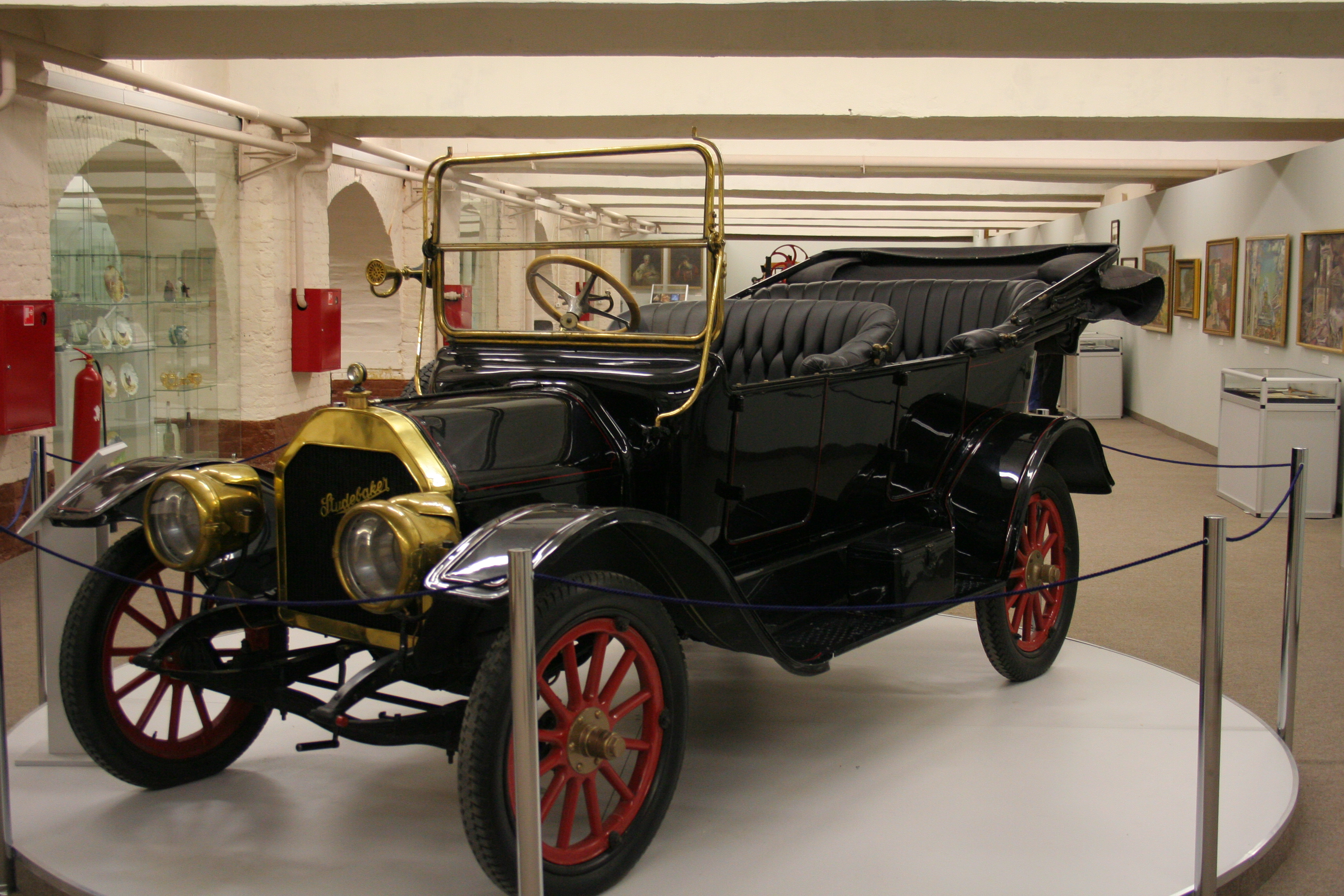

Overview
- Manufacturer: Studebaker
- Production: 1904–1911

Chronology
- Predecessor: Studebaker Electric
- Successor: Studebaker Light Four

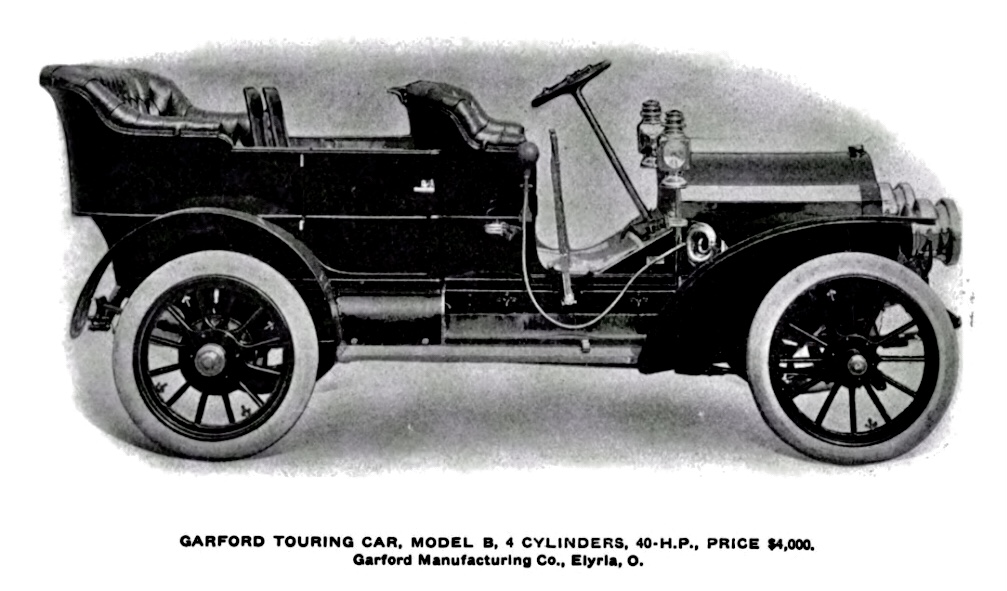
Garford Model B (1908)

Studebaker-Garford was an automobile produced and distributed jointly by the Garford Company of Elyria, Ohio, and the Studebaker Corporation of South Bend, Indiana, from 1904 through 1911. During its production, the car was sold as a Studebaker, per the marketing agreement between the two firms, but Studebaker collectors break the vehicles out under the Studebaker-Garford name because of the extent of Garford components.

Garford was a manufacturer of automobile components and chassis for a number of early automotive works. Studebaker, which had been in the wagon-making business since the 1850s, produced their first automobile in 1897, but did not go into full production until 1902 with the introduction of the Studebaker Electric.

Under the agreement, Garford would assemble each chassis, and then ship it to South Bend for completion. Studebaker-Garfords were powered by gasoline engines which initially produced 8bhp.

The first Studebaker-Garfords were designated Models “A” and “B”, and were listed as five-passenger touring cars with a detachable tonneau, which, once removed, converted the car into a two-person runabout. The Model “C” was also introduced in 1904 and is considered the first formal touring car, but did not come with a collapsible (convertible) top. Headlights for the cars were available at extra cost.

Until its final year, the car received a number of mechanical upgrades as technology advanced:

- 1905, Series 15HP was powered by a two-cylinder horizontal engine producing 15 bhp. Series 020HP introduced a four-cylinder engine, but the engine delivered 15 bhp, not the promised 20 bhp.
- 1906 Series E, F, and G were all four-cylinder cars with increased wheelbase, up two inches to 98” from the previous year. The Studebaker-Garford also introduced a town car body. Options for the open cars included a folding top and windshield. Prices listed for the Model G were $3,700 to $5,000 based on the body style used ($132,583 in today's dollars).

Note: Model G 30 was also built and sold as the Garford, beginning in 1908, after Studebaker took control of the E-M-F Company, with which it had also entered into a body-building, marketing, and distribution deal to sell E-M-F cars through Studebaker wagon dealerships. With the company no longer exclusively relying on Garford, Studebaker unofficially modified the agreement and allowed Garford to enter the automobile business on a limited basis.

- 1907–1911 Studebaker-Garfords from this period emerged with more refinements, and more body styles with each model year. The last Studebaker exclusive model was the G-10.

By 1910, however, chassis production was increasingly favoring Garford's own vehicle brand, and Studebaker was forced to take steps to reassert its contractual rights. Grudgingly, Garford accommodated Studebaker, but the relationship between the two companies became tense. However, by 1911, E-M-F's engine and chassis plant was bought out by Studebaker president Fred Fish and the two firms ended their tenuous relationship.

Garford would continue producing its own cars, but without a distribution network firm, failed to produce a volume sufficient to make the organization profitable. In 1913, Garford was purchased by John North Willys and merged into Willys-Overland.

== See also ==
Media related to Studebaker-Garford at Wikimedia Commons

- Arthur Lovett Garford
