= Alerding =

Alerding may refer to:

- Herman Joseph Alerding, Roman Catholic Bishop of Fort Wayne
- Alerding v. Ohio High School Athletic Association, a court case before the United States Court of Appeals for the Sixth Circuit
