= Frederick Fish =

Frederick Fish may refer to:

- Frederick Samuel Fish (1852–1936), American lawyer, politician and automotive executive at Studebaker
- Frederick Perry Fish (1855–1930), American lawyer and executive, president of American Telephone & Telegraph Corporation
- Fred Fish (1952–2007), American computer programmer known for GNU Debugger and free Fish disks for Amiga
- Freddi Fish, a series of computer games by Humongous Entertainment
