= Alerding v. Ohio High School Athletic Association =

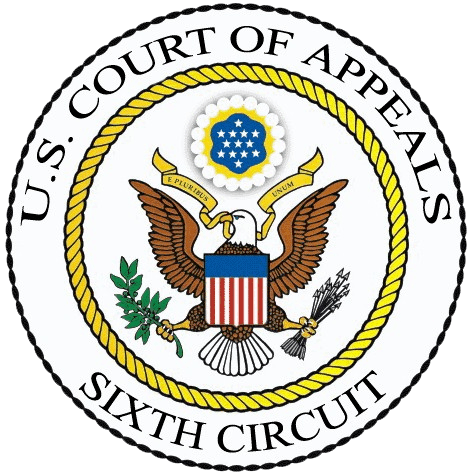
- Court: United States Court of Appeals for the Sixth Circuit
- Full case name: F. Dennis Alerding, individually and as next friend of Dennis C. Alerding, a minor; and Roger H. Moellering, individually and as next friend of David R. Moellering, Douglas R. Moellering and Gregory R. Moellering, minors, Plaintiffs-Appellants, v. Ohio High School Athletic Association; Richard L. Armstrong, Commissioner, Ohio High School Athletic Association and St. Xavier High School, Defendants-Appellees
- Decided: December 17, 1985
- Citation: 779 F.2d 315 (6th Cir. 1985)

Case history
- Prior action: The District court denied the plaintiffs' requests for relief.
- Appealed from: United States District Court for the Southern District of Ohio

Court membership
- Judges sitting: Albert J. Engel Jr., Robert B. Krupansky, John Weld Peck II

Case opinions
- The district court ruling was affirmed.
- Decision by: John Weld Peck II

Keywords
- Privileges and Immunities Clause

Alerding v. Ohio High School Athletic Association, 779 F.2d 315 (6th Cir. 1985) was a court case heard before the United States Court of Appeals for the Sixth Circuit which held that the right to participate in interscholastic sports is not a fundamental privilege protected by the Privileges and Immunities Clause of the United States Constitution. In particular, the court held that the Ohio High School Athletic Association could prohibit private high school athletic programs from recruiting students who live in neighboring states.

== Background ==
Virtually every secondary school in Ohio, whether public or private, is a member of the Ohio High School Athletic Association (OHSAA), which regulates interscholastic sports within the state. By the 1970s, private member schools often dominated state championships, even though they made up only about a quarter of OHSAA's 800 members. Public member schools complained that private schools in border cities were recruiting out-of-state students for varsity sports, giving them a competitive edge over public schools. The association's rule against recruiting or "school hopping" was difficult to enforce against private schools that could enroll students regardless of residence. There was a rule requiring transfer students to wait one year before joining a team, but that usually left three years of play.

On December 18, 1978, OHSAA's 661 member schools defeated a proposal that would have split schools into separate divisions for the 564 public schools and 97 parochial and private schools. Instead, they voted 65.1% in favor of adopting bylaw 4, section 6.4–6.10 (originally known as rule 92G), which states in part: "A student whose parents live in another state will be ineligible for athletics in an Ohio member school." The rule took effect for incoming ninth graders in July 1979. It primarily affected schools in Cincinnati and Toledo, where out-of-state athletes had traditionally competed. In the Cincinnati area, the new rule affected St. Xavier High School, Moeller High School, Summit Country Day School, Cincinnati Country Day School, and Seven Hills School, benefiting Northern Kentucky schools such as Covington Catholic High School. It was nicknamed the "Moeller rule", because head football coach Gerry Faust had made Moeller into a nationally renowned football program that would have been capable of recruiting out of state students.

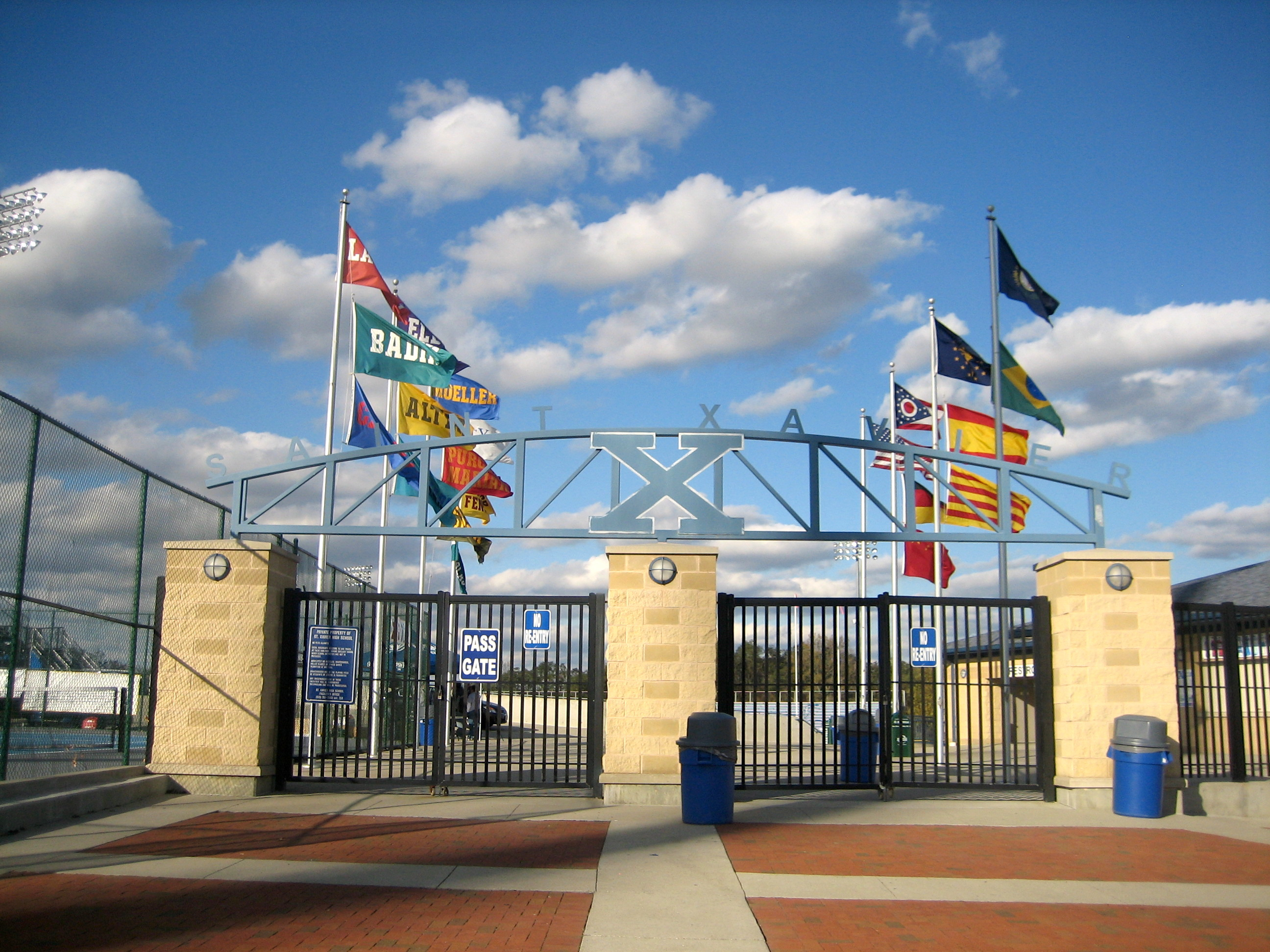
The flags of three states fly outside St. Xavier's football stadium.

Unlike the Archdiocese of Cincinnati's interparochial high schools, St. Xavier was a Jesuit school not subject to parochial boundaries; it drew students from nearby communities in Southeastern Indiana and Northern Kentucky in addition to Southwestern Ohio. In the 1950s, up to a third of St. Xavier students were Kentuckians. Some of St. Xavier's most best-known alumni were star athletes while living in Kentucky, including Jim Bunning, Bob Arnzen, and Charlie Wolf. By the 1980s, St. Xavier competed in several sports at the Division I level and had won numerous district football and tennis titles and several state swimming championships.

In 1980, the parents of eight Northern Kentucky students who had been admitted to St. Xavier, including Tom Menke and Danny Mueller, sued OHSAA in Hamilton County Court of Common Pleas because the students would be banned from competition under bylaw 4–6–10. The common pleas court let the rule stand, and a state appellate court upheld the decision in September 1981.

Dennis C. Alerding resided in Fort Thomas, Kentucky, and attended St. Xavier as a sophomore. Three Moellering brothers lived in Lakeside Park, Kentucky, and also attended St. Xavier: David R., a junior, Douglas R., a sophomore, and Gregory R., a freshman. All were ineligible to participate in the school's athletic programs due to bylaw 4–6–10. Alerding practiced with the wrestling team but could not participate in meets, while David Moellering had wanted to play baseball or basketball. In October 1983, their fathers, F. Dennis Alerding and Roger H. Moellering, filed suit against OHSAA and St. Xavier in the United States District Court for the Southern District of Ohio, alleging that the bylaw violated the four students' constitutional right to a complete education. They sought a temporary injunction before the end of the winter athletic season and a declaratory judgment against the ban. The plaintiffs noted that Menke did not concern the constitutionality of the bylaw and cited a passage in the OHSAA constitution, which read in part: "Competitive sports are an inherent part of the total education program for students in secondary schools."

== Legal proceedings ==
The case came before the United States District Court for the Southern District of Ohio. On November 23, 1983, Judge S. Arthur Spiegel denied the temporary restraining order because Alerding and Moellering would have known about the ban prior to enrolling their sons at St. Xavier, and because the order would have forced part of the 1983–84 season to be played under temporary rules. On June 5, 1984, Judge Spiegel heard the case for three hours, then asked attorneys for the plaintiffs to return with information on how Michigan, Indiana, Kentucky, West Virginia, and Pennsylvania treat out-of-state student-athletes.

On August 20, 1984, the district court found that the OHSAA bylaw could be considered a state action. However, citing San Antonio Independent School District v. Rodriguez and the recent Camden case, the court ruled that interscholastic high school athletics was not protected by the Privileges and Immunities Clause, reasoning that school athletics pales in comparison to the employment opportunities that the clause often concerns. Given that the courts had ruled educational opportunity not to be a fundamental privilege, extracurricular activities could not be considered fundamental either. The court acknowledged that educational opportunities may be a prerequisite for employment opportunities, but considered the impact of the bylaw to be a matter of degree. Based on these findings, the court denied the plaintiffs' requests for an injunction and declaratory judgment.

In response, State Representative Dave Karmol of Toledo introduced a bill that would have prohibited OHSAA from considering a student's state of residence in determining eligibility. Karmol said that Toledo-area schools, both public and private, supported the measure, but the bill did not advance.

Alerding and Moellering appealed to the United States Court of Appeals for the Sixth Circuit, arguing that Rodriguez pertained to the Equal Protection Clause rather than the Privileges and Immunities Clause, and that the court should consider instead whether the bylaw was related to OHSAA's objective of eliminating unfair recruiting. On December 17, 1985, the appellate court disagreed with both aspects of the appeal and affirmed the district court's ruling, allowing OHSAA's bylaw to stand. By then, St. Xavier had 1,250 students, and the number of students from Kentucky had fallen to 35. St. Xavier principal Michael Trainor predicted that the ruling would further weaken St. Xavier's Kentucky enrollment despite strong historical family loyalties to the school there.

Around the same time as the Alerding case, John W. and Judy Zeiler of Bedford Township, Monroe County, Michigan, sued OHSAA before the United States District Court for the Northern District of Ohio on behalf of their three children who attended Central Catholic High School in Toledo, along with 32 other Michigan children. John William Potter of the district court granted a temporary restraining order, but the court ultimately allowed bylaw 4-6-10 to stand; this ruling was upheld without comment by the United States Supreme Court in 1985.

== Impact ==
Alerding has been cited in later cases to show that the actions of state high school athletic associations, such as OHSAA, are considered to be state action.

OHSAA bylaw 4-6-10 barring out-of-state students remains in effect. A 2015 article in the Journal of Law and Education suggests that restrictions such as OHSAA's bylaw, as affirmed by the Sixth Circuit, should be revisited in light of the increasing importance of school athletics in future career prospects.

Despite the prohibition on out-of-state students, OHSAA's public member schools continued to complain that private schools and public open enrollment schools enjoyed an unfair advantage over public schools by drawing students from a broader geographic area than conventional school district boundaries. In May 2014, a majority of member school principals rejected a plan to hold separate district, regional, and state championships for public schools and private schools, similar to the proposal that failed in 1978. Instead, they voted to institute a "competitive balance" plan that took effect for six major sports during the 2017–18 school year.
