= Senator Fish =

Senator Fish may refer to:

- Erland F. Fish (1883–1942), Massachusetts State Senate
- Frederick Samuel Fish (1852–1936), New Jersey State Senate
- Hamilton Fish (1808–1893), U.S. Senator from New York from 1851 to 1857
