= Smoky Hollow (neighborhood) =

Neighborhood in Youngstown, Ohio, United States

Coordinates: 41°06′14″N 80°38′29″W

Smoky Hollow (also known as The Hollow) is a neighborhood in Youngstown, Ohio. Located northeast of Youngstown's downtown, Smoky Hollow is now part of the campus of Youngstown State University. The district has long been in a state of decline, but plans are now underway to transform Smoky Hollow into a large field built to serve the University.

== Neighborhood ==
The Smoky Hollow district runs along the west side of Crab Creek near the Mahoning River. The neighborhood's name derives from the fact that the area was often saturated with smoke from the nearby Mahoning Valley Iron Company. The area was originally owned by the James Wick family of Youngstown. By the late 1800s, however, immigrants begin building simple homes on this land, which was within walking distance of the mills that sat along Crab Creek. Smoky Hollow was a high-density housing neighborhood of immigrants from around the world. By the early 20th century, however, the neighborhood was dominated by Italian Americans. In 1910 there were 576 families living in the Hollow – a mix of Slovak, Irish, Italian, English, Jewish, German, and African-American. The area has produced many prominent residents, notably businessman and shopping mall pioneer Edward J. DeBartolo, Sr., who was born in Smoky Hollow in 1919. The neighborhood remained viable into the 1960s when it fell victim to suburban migration, university expansion, and real estate disinvestment.

While most of Smoky Hollow was laid out on a grid, the far northern section became a development known as Oak Park. In 1910, a group of wealthy Youngstowners formed the Modem Homes Company of Youngstown to build homes for Youngstown's working class. Eventually over a two-and- a-half year period, 110 homes were built. These homes were built of concrete, block, and stucco with tile roofs and modern conveniences. They were a mix of single-family homes and row houses centered on the 2.41-acre (9,800 m^{2}) Oak Park.

Smoky Hollow borders present-day Youngstown State University, and several YSU facilities are located in the Hollow. One landmark of the "old neighborhood" remains, however. The Mahoning Valley Restaurant (usually shortened to the MVR), an Italian bar and restaurant, has operated in the Hollow since the late 1920s. Also located in the vicinity of Smoky Hollow is the central branch of the Youngstown and Mahoning County library system, which contains rare archival data. Several traditional homes remain in the neighborhood, but the population has fallen dramatically.

== Redevelopment plan ==
Aside from the aforementioned, Smoky Hollow is a fairly vacant neighborhood, and its proximity to both a college campus and a central downtown area made it a fairly attractive area for redevelopment. In 2002, a non-profit group called Wick Neighbors Inc. was established to aide in the redevelopment. Aiming to reestablish the area as "a regionally competitive contemporary neighborhood", the group's goal is to build the neighborhood to make it a more livable area, with plans to create housing, green space, retail, and business space in an effort to lure people and businesses to Youngstown.

== Notable residents ==
- Edward J. DeBartolo, Sr. - Shopping Mall Developer, born in Smoky Hollow.
- Nathaniel R. Jones - Federal Judge, retired as judge of U.S. Court of Appeals for the Sixth Circuit; born in Smoky Hollow.
- Jack L. Warner - Movie Mogul, spent part of childhood and youth in Smoky Hollow.
- Dom Rosselli - Youngstown State University basketball, baseball, and football coach, born in Smoky Hollow.
