= David Stewart Porter =

American judge (1909–1989)

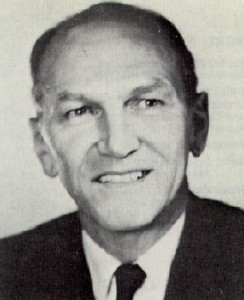

Senior Judge of the United States District Court for the Southern District of Ohio
- In office September 23, 1979 – January 5, 1989

Chief Judge of the United States District Court for the Southern District of Ohio
- In office 1977–1979
- Preceded by: Timothy Sylvester Hogan
- Succeeded by: Carl Bernard Rubin

Judge of the United States District Court for the Southern District of Ohio
- In office November 3, 1966 – September 23, 1979
- Appointed by: Lyndon B. Johnson
- Preceded by: Seat established by 80 Stat. 75
- Succeeded by: S. Arthur Spiegel

Personal details
- Born: David Stewart Porter; September 23, 1909 Cincinnati, Ohio, U.S.
- Died: January 5, 1989 (aged 79)
- Education: University of Cincinnati (A.B.); University of Cincinnati College of Law (J.D.)

David Stewart Porter (September 23, 1909 – January 5, 1989) was a United States district judge of the United States District Court for the Southern District of Ohio.

== Education and career ==
Born in Cincinnati, Ohio, Porter received an Artium Baccalaureus degree from the University of Cincinnati in 1932 and a Juris Doctor from the University of Cincinnati College of Law in 1934. He was an attorney for the Legal Department of the Tennessee Valley Authority from 1935 to 1936. He was in private practice in Troy, Ohio from 1936 to 1949. He was a judge of the Court of Common Pleas for Miami County, Ohio from 1949 to 1966.

== Federal judicial service ==
Porter was nominated by President Lyndon B. Johnson on September 30, 1966, to the United States District Court for the Southern District of Ohio, to a new seat created by 80 Stat. 75. He was confirmed by the United States Senate on October 20, 1966, and received his commission on November 3, 1966. He served as Chief Judge from 1977 to 1979. He assumed senior status on September 23, 1979. Porter served in that capacity until his death on January 5, 1989.

== Sources ==
Legal offices
Preceded by Seat established by 80 Stat. 75	Judge of the United States District Court for the Southern District of Ohio; 1966–1979	Succeeded by S. Arthur Spiegel
Preceded by Timothy Sylvester Hogan	Chief Judge of the United States District Court for the Southern District of Ohio; 1977–1979	Succeeded by Carl Bernard Rubin
