= 1912 Ohio gubernatorial election =

- November 5, 1912

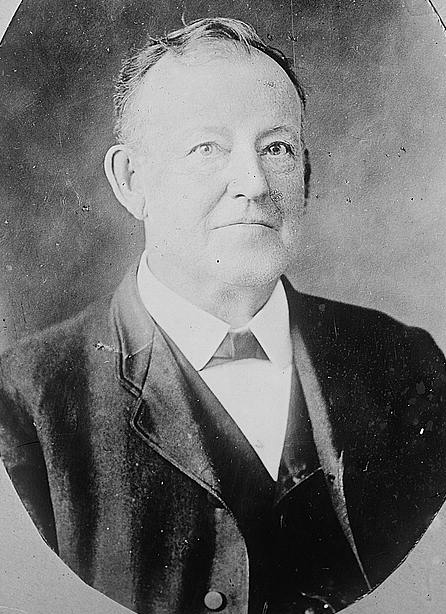

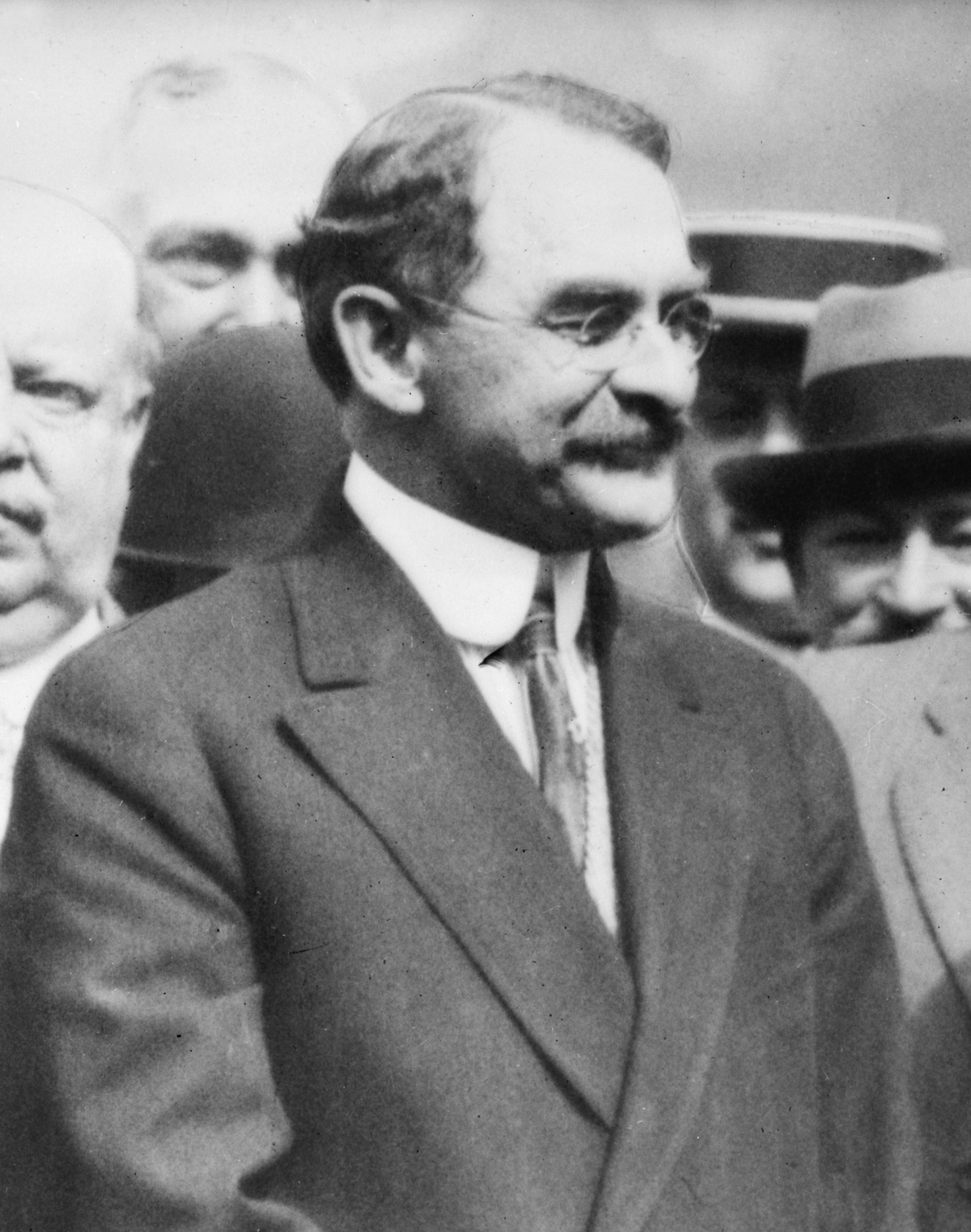

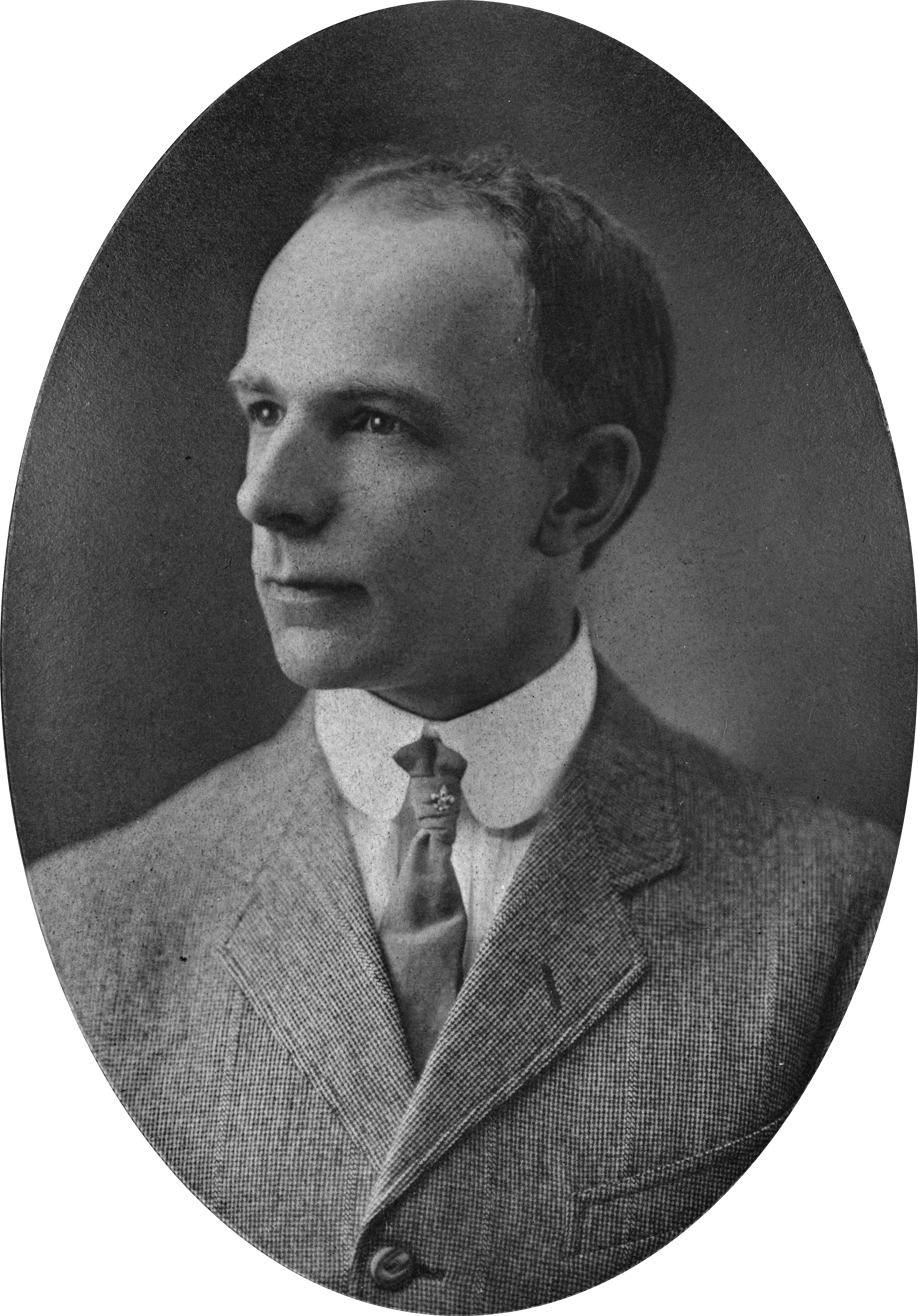
Nominee	James M. Cox	Robert B. Brown
Party	Democratic	Republican
Popular vote	439,323	272,500
Percentage	42.38%	26.29%
Nominee	Arthur Lovett Garford	C. E. Ruthenberg
Party	Progressive	Socialist
Popular vote	217,903	87,709
Percentage	21.02%	8.46%
County Results
Cox
30–40%
40–50%
50–60%
60–70%
Brown
30–40%
40–50%
Garford
30–40%
40–50%
50–60%
Governor before election
Judson Harmon
Democratic
Elected Governor
James M. Cox
Democratic

The 1912 Ohio gubernatorial election was held on November 5, 1912. Democratic nominee James M. Cox defeated Republican nominee Robert B. Brown with 42.38% of the vote.

== General election ==
=== Candidates ===
Major party candidates

- James M. Cox, Democratic
- Robert B. Brown, Republican

Other candidates

- Arthur Lovett Garford, Progressive
- C. E. Ruthenberg, Socialist
- Daniel A. Poling, Prohibition
- John Kircher, Socialist Labor

=== Results ===
1912 Ohio gubernatorial election
Party	Candidate	Votes	%	±%
Democratic	James M. Cox	439,323	42.38%	
Republican	Robert B. Brown	272,500	26.29%	
Progressive	Arthur Lovett Garford	217,903	21.02%	
Socialist	C. E. Ruthenberg	87,709	8.46%	
Prohibition	Daniel A. Poling	16,607	1.60%	
Socialist Labor	John Kircher	2,689	0.26%	
Majority		166,823		
Turnout				
Democratic hold		Swing		
