= Robert B. Brown =

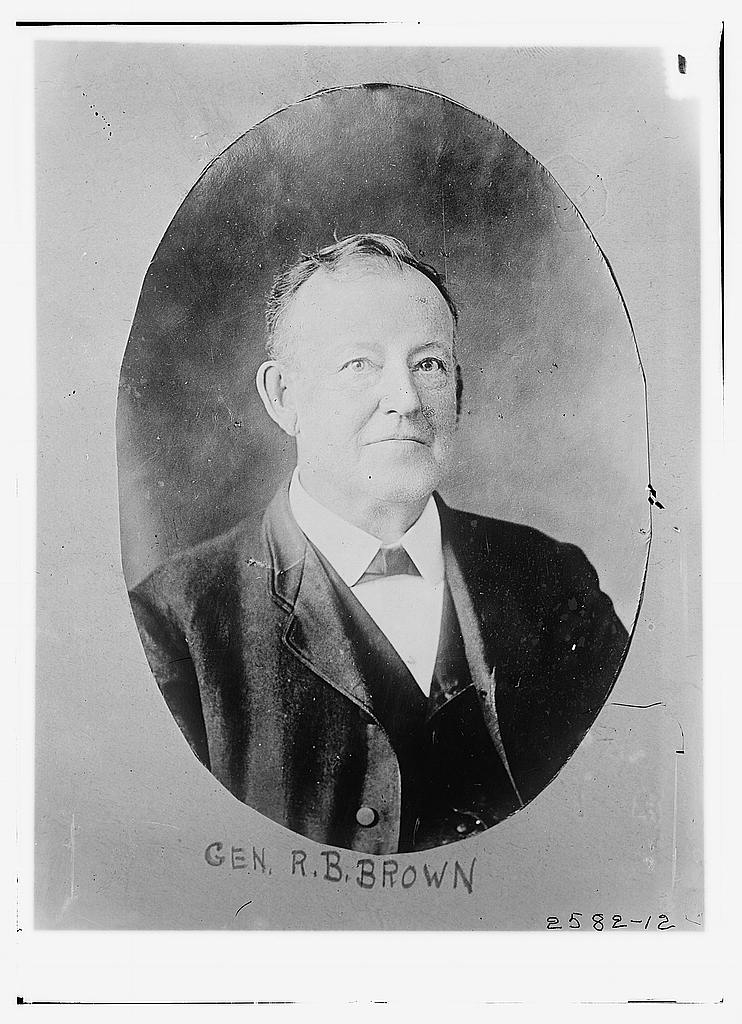

Personal details
- Born: October 2, 1844 New Concord, Ohio, U.S.
- Died: July 30, 1916 (aged 71) Zanesville, Ohio, U.S.
- Resting place: Zanesville, Ohio
- Party: Republican

Military service
- Allegiance: United States of America
- Branch/service: United States Army
- Rank: Private
- Unit: 15th Regiment Ohio Volunteer Infantry - Company A
- Battles/wars: Battle of Missionary Ridge
- Awards: Medal of Honor

Private Robert Burns Brown (October 2, 1844 – July 30, 1916) was an American soldier who fought in the American Civil War. Brown received the country's highest award for bravery during combat, the Medal of Honor, for his action during the Battle of Missionary Ridge in Tennessee on November 25, 1863. He was honored with the award on 27 March 1890.

== Biography ==
Brown was born in New Concord, Ohio on 2 October 1844. He enlisted into the 15th Ohio Infantry at Zanesville.

== Medal of Honor citation ==
Upon reaching the ridge through concentrated fire, he approached the color bearer of the 9th Mississippi Infantry (C.S.A.), demanded his surrender with threatening gesture and took him prisoner with his regimental flag.

== See also ==
- List of American Civil War Medal of Honor recipients: A–F

Party political offices
Preceded by Warren G. Harding	Republican Party nominee for Governor of Ohio; 1912	Succeeded by Frank B. Willis
