= Stephanie J. Jones =

American legal scholar

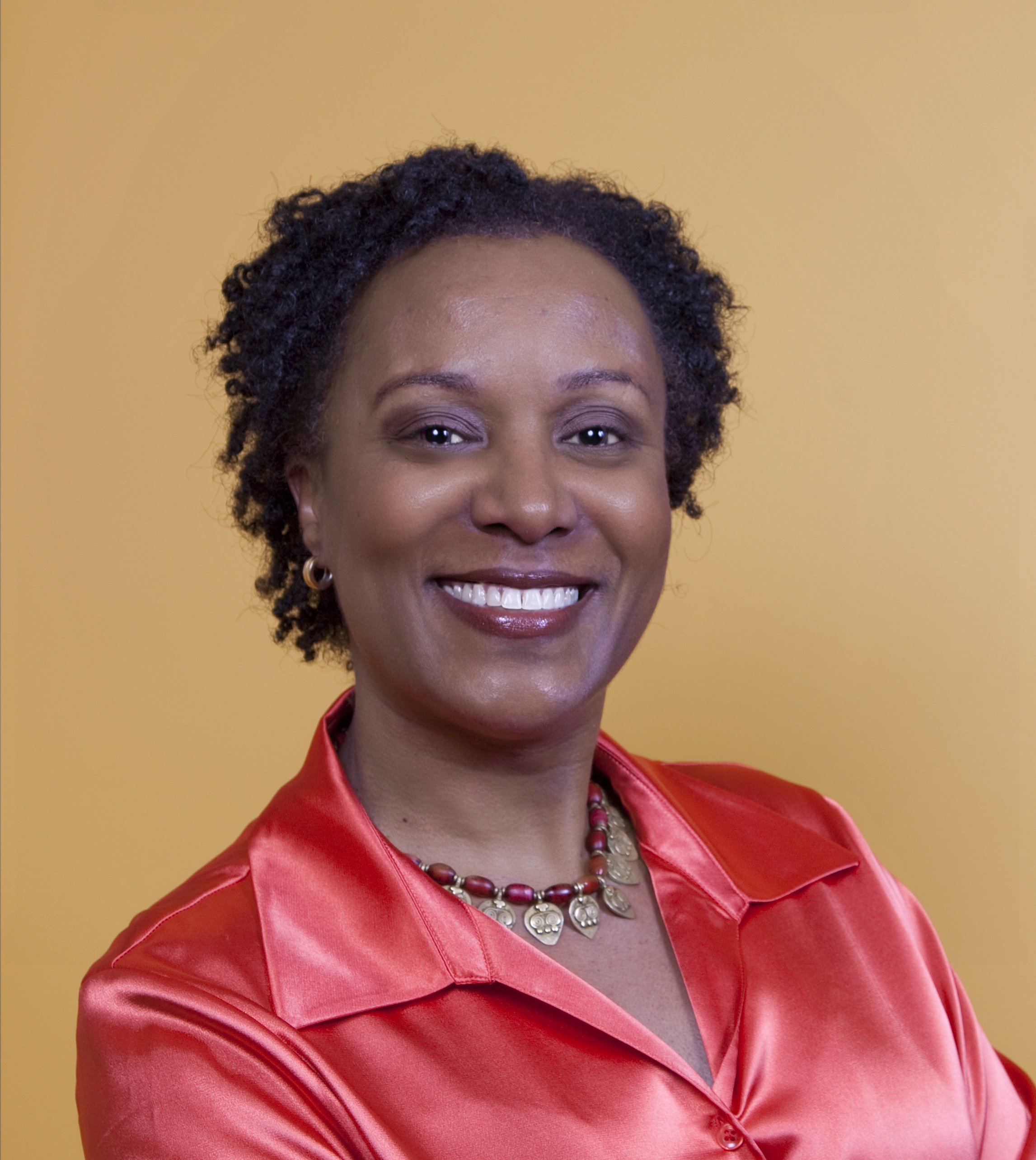
Jones in 2010

Stephanie J. Jones is an American lawyer, writer and former senior government official, and she is the President of the Nathaniel R. Jones Foundation. She was the federal government's first Chief Opportunities Officer and Editor-in-Chief of The State of Black America.

Jones is the creator and author of Sunday Morning Apartheid: A Diversity Study of the Sunday Morning Talk Shows.

== Early life and education ==
Stephanie Jones grew up in Youngstown, Ohio and later moved to Ridgewood, a village in New Jersey. She is the daughter of Nathaniel R. Jones, retired Sixth Circuit Court of Appeals judge and former general counsel of the National Association for the Advancement of Colored People (NAACP). She is the granddaughter of author Lorenz Graham and great-niece of Shirley Graham and W. E. B. DuBois.

Jones earned a bachelor's degree in English Literature and Afro-American studies from Smith College in Northampton, Massachusetts. She earned her Juris Doctor degree from the University of Cincinnati College of Law, where she was a fellow in the Urban Morgan Institute for Human Rights. She also attended Tuskegee Institute (now Tuskegee University).

== Career ==
Jones is the president and board member of the Nathaniel R. Jones Foundation, a non-profit devoted to advancing the civil rights legacy of her father, Nathaniel R. Jones. She was the first chief opportunities officer in the federal government, appointed by Transportation Secretary Anthony Foxx. She also served as deputy chief of staff and senior counsellor to the secretary at the U.S. Department of Transportation. Jones was the executive director of the National Urban League Policy Institute and editor-in-chief of The State of Black America.

Jones is the creator and author of Sunday Morning Apartheid: A Diversity Study of the Sunday Morning Talk Shows. Following the release of the study, cable and network executives substantially increased the diversity of their talk show host and guest line-ups.

She was previously chief counsel to Senator John Edwards from 2002 to 2005 and chief of staff to Representative Stephanie Tubbs Jones from 2000 to 2002. She served in the Clinton Administration as Secretary's Regional Representative in the U.S. Department of Education (Region V). She was a consultant to the January 6 Select Committee.

Before entering government service, Jones was an associate professor of Law at Northern Kentucky University's Salmon P. Chase College of Law, where she taught civil rights law, civil and criminal procedure, entertainment law, and trial advocacy. Jones has also served on the adjunct faculty of Northwestern University School of Law. She previously practiced law with the firm Graydon, Head & Ritchey in Cincinnati. Prior to her legal career, Jones was a staff reporter at the Cincinnati Post. During the early 1980s, she was personal assistant to Lionel Richie and The Commodores.
