= Studebaker Electric =

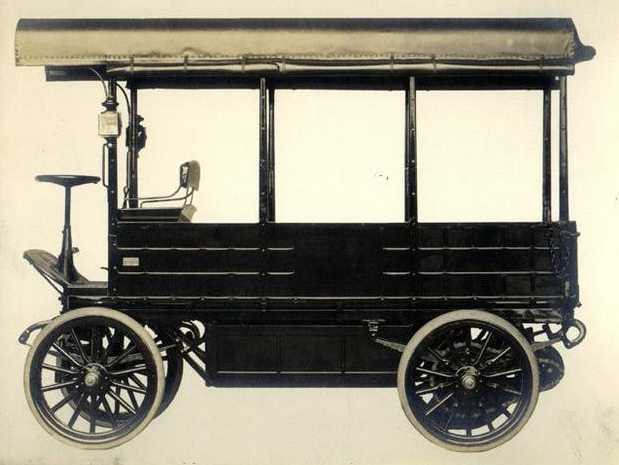

Overview
- Manufacturer: Studebaker
- Production: 1902–1912

Chronology
- Successor: Studebaker-Garford

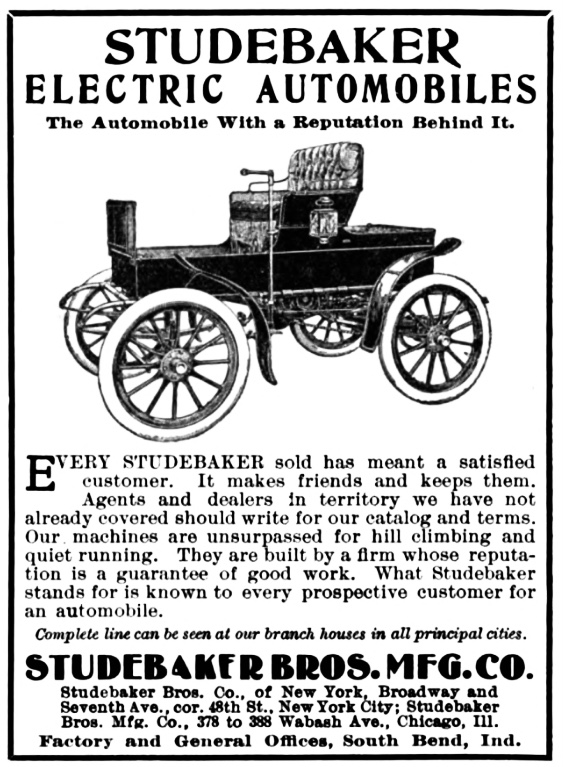
Studebaker Electric (1903)

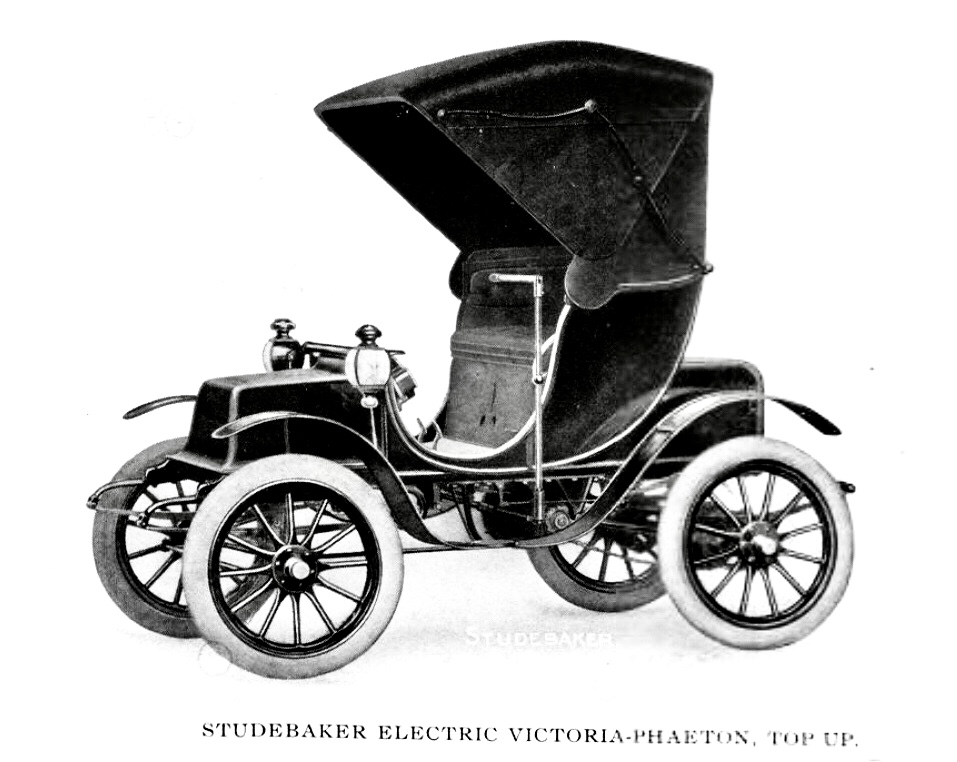
Studebaker Model 16

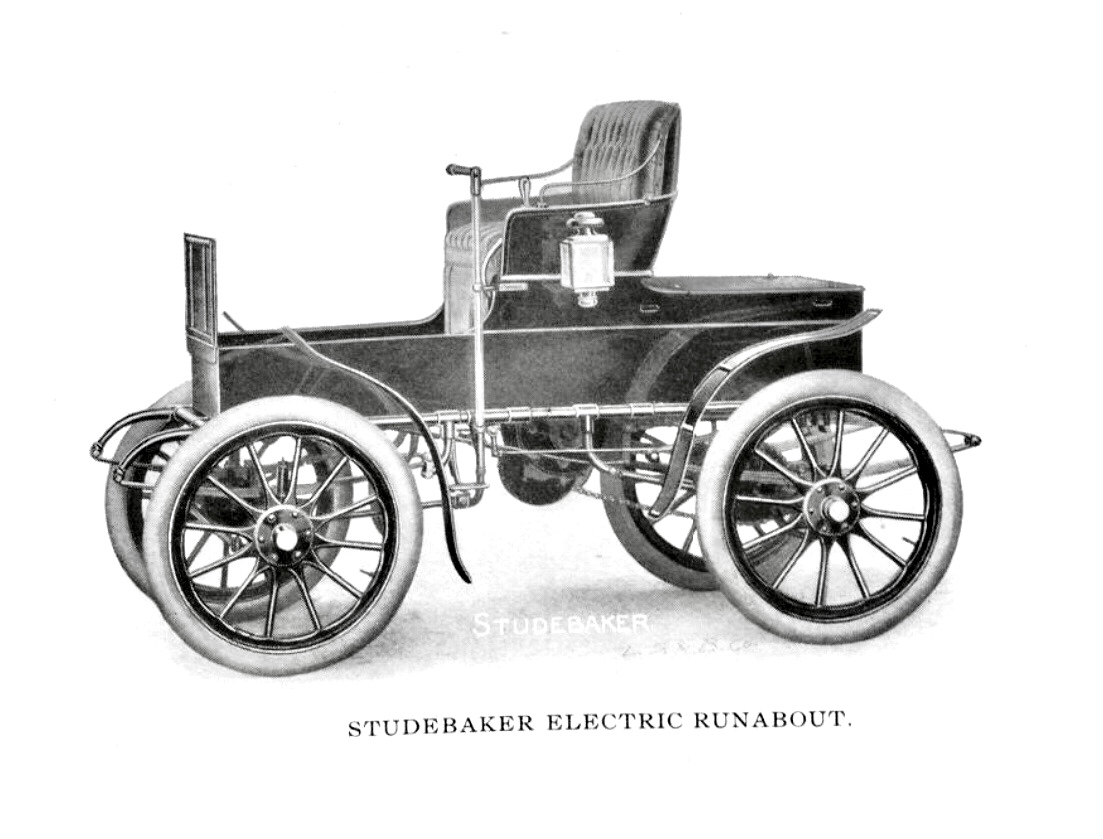
Studebaker Model 22 Runabout

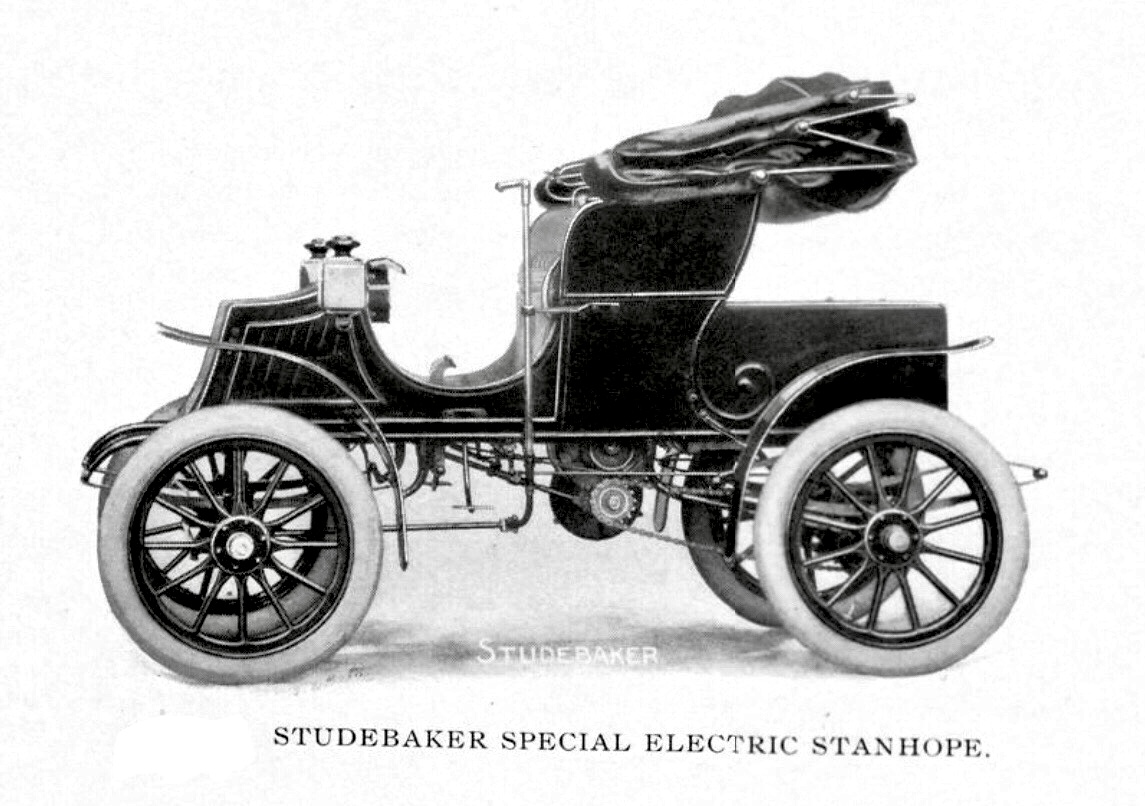
Studebaker Model 24 Stanhope (1904–1906)

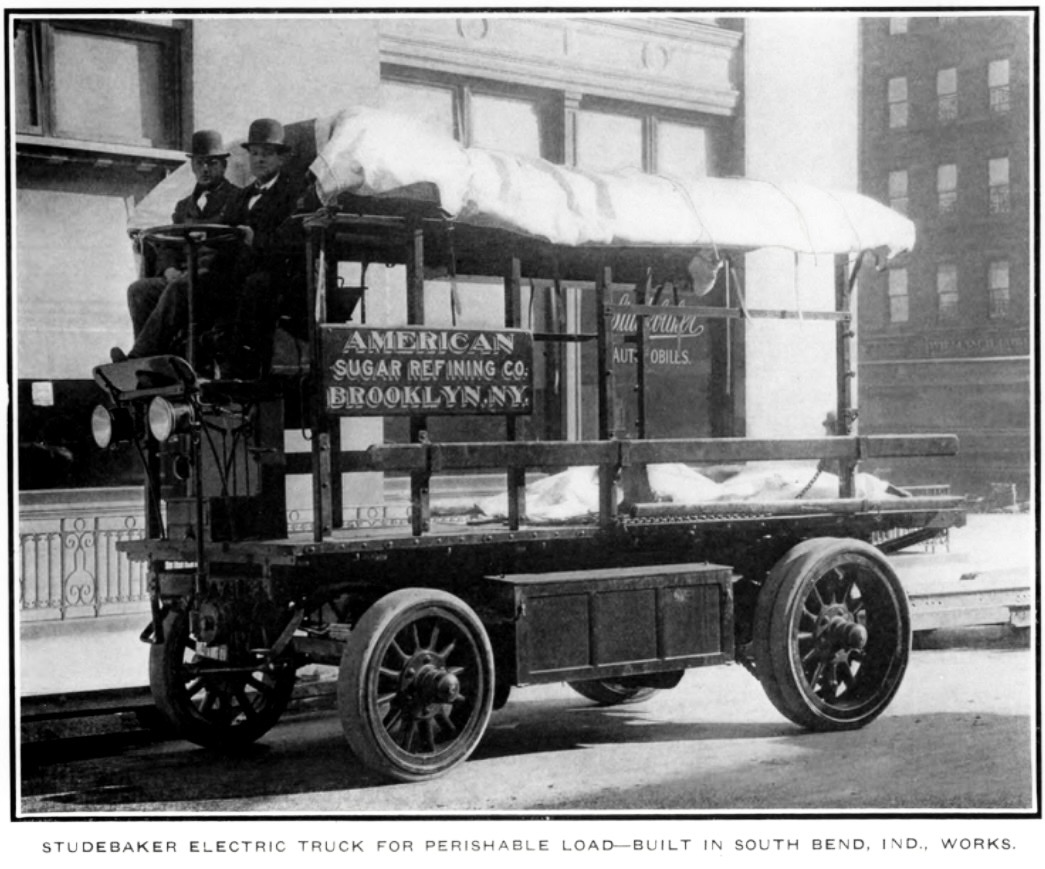
Studebaker Model 24 truck

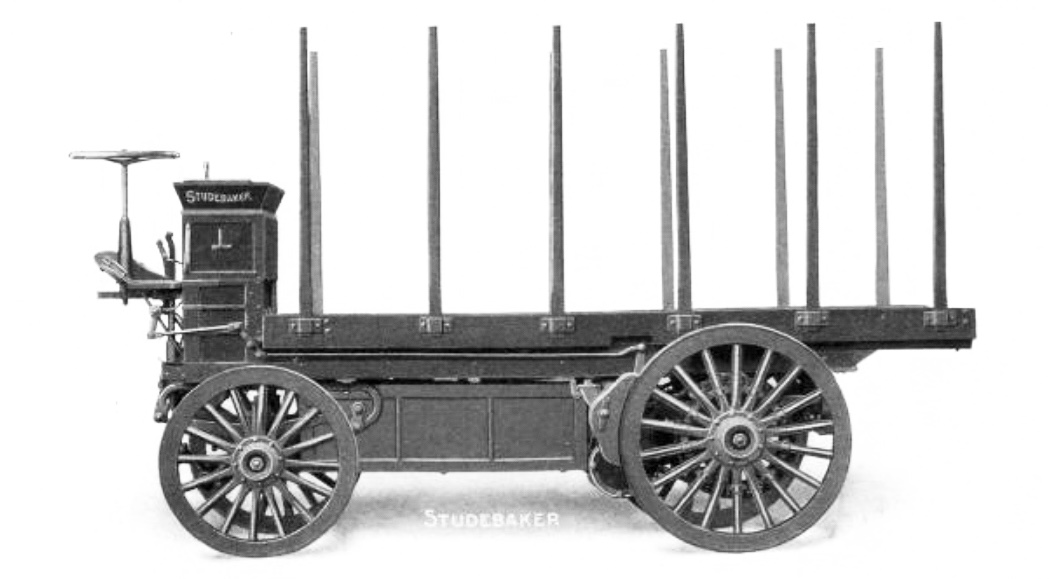
Studebaker Model 2013 Truck 3,5 t

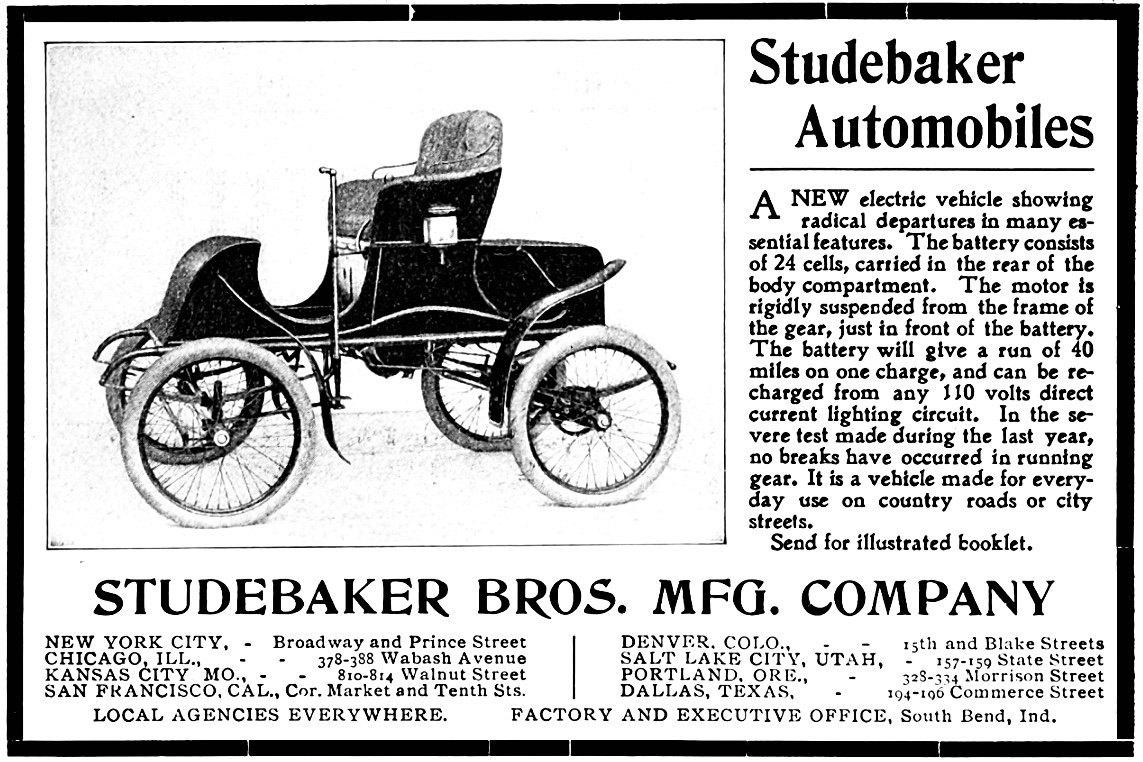
Studebaker; The first automobile ever produced by Studebaker was this electric vehicle. (1902) In 1902, twenty electric vehicles were produced. By 1912, 1,841 electric vehicles had been produced.

The Studebaker Electric was a car manufactured by the Studebaker Brothers Manufacturing Company of South Bend, Indiana, a forerunner of the Studebaker Corporation. The battery-powered cars were sold from 1902 to 1912.

Studebaker entered into the automobile manufacturing field in 1898 when Frederick S. Fish, as chairman of the executive committee, persuaded the board to supply $4,000, or $148,846 today, for the development of an electric vehicle. However, lacking the board's full support, the project yielded one car. The company did, however, enter into the field of producing bodies for electric taxis through Albert Augustus Pope’s Electric Vehicle Company.

Studebaker formally began production in earnest in 1902, and the company chose battery-powered electric vehicles because they were clean, easily recharged, and worked well in urban centers without ever needing to visit a refueling depot (gas stations).

Studebaker Electrics were available in a variety of body styles, many of which mimicked the bodies that the brand had long produced for its lucrative passenger carriage line. These included the Stanhope, Victoria, and Surrey. A four-passenger model was introduced in 1904.

Fish realized early on that Studebaker's future did not rest in the limited electric car, but in the gasoline-powered automobile. Studebaker's field of expertise was in body building and product distribution, not engine building. This realization led to the creation of the Studebaker-Garford automobile in 1904. The joint agreement worked well until 1909-1910, when Garford attempted to divert chassis to its own brand of automobile. Studebaker, looking for an affordable car to sell, entered into an agreement with the E-M-F Company of Detroit. E-M-F would build the entire car, which would then be distributed through Studebaker wagon dealers.

Still, Studebaker continued to build electric vehicles until Fish decided to begin the process of seizing control of E-M-F in 1909, which Studebaker completed by 1910.

By 1912, it became conventional wisdom that the future lay in gasoline-powered engines rather than heavy, sluggish electrics, and the limited production of electric cars stopped. An official announcement from the newly re-incorporated Studebaker Corporation stated:

The production of electric automobiles at South Bend has ended. . . It has been conducted for nine years without much success, and ultimately the superiority of the gasoline car (is) apparent.

== Overview of Electric Vehicles ==
Year	Model	Wheel base	Tread	Cells	Speed	Price
	Model 13	1854 mm	1372 mm	36	18 m.p.h.	1650 Dollar
	Model 15	1727 mm	1372 mm	28	13 m.p.h.	2200 Dollar
1906	Model 16	1727 mm	1372 mm	28	14 m.p.h.	1750 Dollar
1906	Model 20	mm	mm		m.p.h.	2800 Dollar
1906	Model 21	mm	mm		m.p.h.	3500 Dollar
1906	Model 22	1549 mm	1372 mm	24	13 m.p.h.	1050 Dollar
1904-1906	Model 24	1803 mm	1372 mm	36	18 m.p.h.	1200 Dollar
1906	Model 2000 Delivery Van	mm	mm		m.p.h.	2300 Dollar
1906	Model 2006 Delivery Van	mm	mm		m.p.h.	2400 Dollar
	Model 2011 Delivery Van	2134 mm	1372 mm	30	12 m.p.h.	1850 Dollar
1906	Model 2012 Omnibus	mm	mm		m.p.h.	2800 Dollar
1905-1906	Model 2013 Truck 3,5 t	3302 mm	1803 mm	40	8 m.p.h.	3500 Dollar
1906	Model 2017 Truck 5 t	mm	mm		m.p.h.	4250 Dollar
1906	Model 2024 Truck 2 t	mm	mm		m.p.h.	2000 Dollar

== See also ==
- Studebaker
- Studebaker National Museum
