= Nathaniel R. Jones =

American judge (1926–2020)

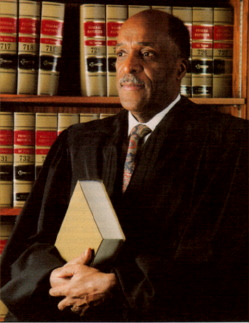

Senior Judge of the United States Court of Appeals for the Sixth Circuit
- In office May 13, 1995 – March 30, 2002

Judge of the United States Court of Appeals for the Sixth Circuit
- In office October 5, 1979 – May 13, 1995
- Appointed by: Jimmy Carter
- Preceded by: John Weld Peck II
- Succeeded by: R. Guy Cole Jr.

Personal details
- Born: Nathaniel Raphael Jones; May 12, 1926 Youngstown, Ohio, U.S.
- Died: January 26, 2020 (aged 93) Cincinnati, Ohio, U.S.
- Education: Youngstown State University (AB, LLB)

Nathaniel Raphael Jones (May 12, 1926 – January 26, 2020) was an American attorney, judge, and law professor. As general counsel of the NAACP, Jones fought to end school segregation, including in the northern United States. From 1979 until 1995, he served as a United States circuit judge of the United States Court of Appeals for the Sixth Circuit before assuming senior status, and in 2002 retired to resume a private legal practice.

== Early years ==
Jones was born in the Smoky Hollow district of Youngstown, Ohio, several blocks from a federal courthouse that now bears his name. Although he lived in an integrated neighborhood and attended an integrated public high school, his mother took him to the local segregated YMCA, where he heard and met national civil rights leaders. She also introduced him to J. Maynard Dickerson, a lawyer as well as publisher of the weekly black newspaper, The Buckeye Review, who became his mentor. Jones became active in the local NAACP's youth council and successfully organized a boycott of the local roller skating rink, which previously only allowed blacks to skate only on Monday nights. He graduated high school in 1945 and was inducted in the U.S. Army since World War II had not yet ended. He later recalled his shock at the segregated training facility at Camp Atterbury, Indiana, and those Italian prisoners of war received better treatment than black soldiers. Nonetheless, Jones served with the United States Army Air Corps.

After the war, using the GI Bill, Jones entered Youngstown College (now Youngstown State University). There, he continued working with the NAACP, and when nearby Warren, Ohio tried to bar blacks from the local swimming pool, he saw future Supreme Court justice Thurgood Marshall in action. After receiving his Artium Baccalaureus degree in 1951, he enrolled in law school, studying at nights while serving as director of Youngstown's Fair Employment Practices Commission. He graduated in 1956, receiving a Bachelor of Laws degree.

== Legal career ==
Jones was admitted to the bar in 1957, setting up his own private practice. In 1961, Attorney General Robert Kennedy nominated him as Assistant United States Attorney for the Northern District of Ohio in Cleveland. Thus in 1962, he became the first African American to serve in that position in the district. He held that position until his 1967 appointment as Assistant General Counsel to President Lyndon B. Johnson's National Advisory Commission on Civil Disorders (the Kerner Commission). Following his term with the Kerner Commission, Jones returned to private practice with the firm of Goldberg & Jones in Youngstown, the first integrated law firm in the city.

In 1969, he was asked to serve as general counsel of the NAACP by executive director Roy Wilkins. The following year, Jones was honored by more than 600 dignitaries at an NAACP recognition banquet held in Youngstown. In a keynote address, he described the situation of African Americans in the following terms: "We still live in the basement of the great society. We must keep plodding until we get what we are striving for". For the next nine years, Jones directed all NAACP litigation. In addition to personally arguing several cases in the United States Supreme Court, he coordinated national efforts to end northern school segregation, to defend affirmative action, and to inquire into discrimination against black servicemen in the United States military. He also successfully coordinated the NAACP's defense on First Amendment grounds in the Mississippi Boycott case and won Reed v. Rhodes, which desegregated Cleveland-area schools. He also argued on behalf of the NAACP in Milliken v. Bradley, a case that ultimately dealt a severe blow to desegregation efforts.

== Judicial career and beyond ==
President Jimmy Carter on August 28, 1979, nominated Jones, to a seat on the United States Court of Appeals for the Sixth Circuit vacated by Judge John Weld Peck II. The United States Senate confirmed his nomination on October 4, 1979, and he received his commission on October 5, 1979. He took his judicial oath on October 15, 1979. He assumed senior status on May 13, 1995. His service terminated on March 30, 2002, when he retired. While on the federal bench, in addition to hearing cases, Judge Jones taught at Harvard Law School and at the University of Cincinnati College of Law. He also made many trips to South Africa. He spoke against the legal underpinnings of apartheid, became one of the observers for the first democratic elections in 1993, and later consulted with drafters of the South African constitution.

After his retirement, Jones became a Senior Counsel in the Cincinnati office of Blank Rome LLP, also serving as its Chief Diversity and Inclusion officer. He also wrote a memoir, ''Answering the Call: An Autobiography of the Modern Struggle to End Racial Discrimination in America'' (2016), with a foreword by Harvard professor Evelyn Brooks Higgenbotham. On May 6, 2003, the second federal courthouse established in his hometown of Youngstown, Ohio was named in honor of Jones. Former U.S. Representative Louis B. Stokes of Cleveland was on hand for the naming ceremony. "This building, which will forever carry your name, will be a testament to outstanding public service by a local boy made good", Stokes said. Jones received the NAACP's Spingarn Medal in 2016, its highest honor. He received the Laurel Wreath, his fraternity Kappa Alpha Psi's highest honor, in 2009. The University of Cincinnati named its Center for Race, Gender, and Social Justice to honor Judge Jones in 2019. He also received 19 honorary degrees.

== Personal life ==
Jones was married to the late Jean Graham Jones, with whom he had a daughter, Stephanie J. Jones, and the late Lillian Hawthorne Jones (nee Graham), and had four stepchildren: Pamela L. Velez, William L. Hawthorne, Ricky B. Hawthorne, and Marc D. Hawthorne. Jones was a Prince Hall Freemason and a member of Kappa Alpha Psi fraternity. Jones died on January 26, 2020, at the age of 93 from congestive heart failure.

== See also ==
- List of African-American federal judges
- List of African-American jurists

Legal offices
Preceded by John Weld Peck II	Judge of the United States Court of Appeals for the Sixth Circuit; 1979–1995	Succeeded by R. Guy Cole Jr.
