= 1910 Ohio gubernatorial election =

- November 8, 1910
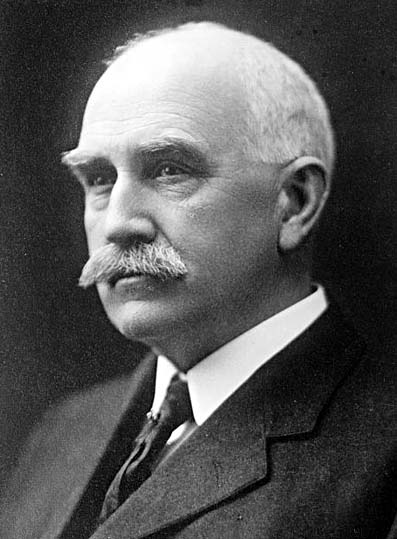

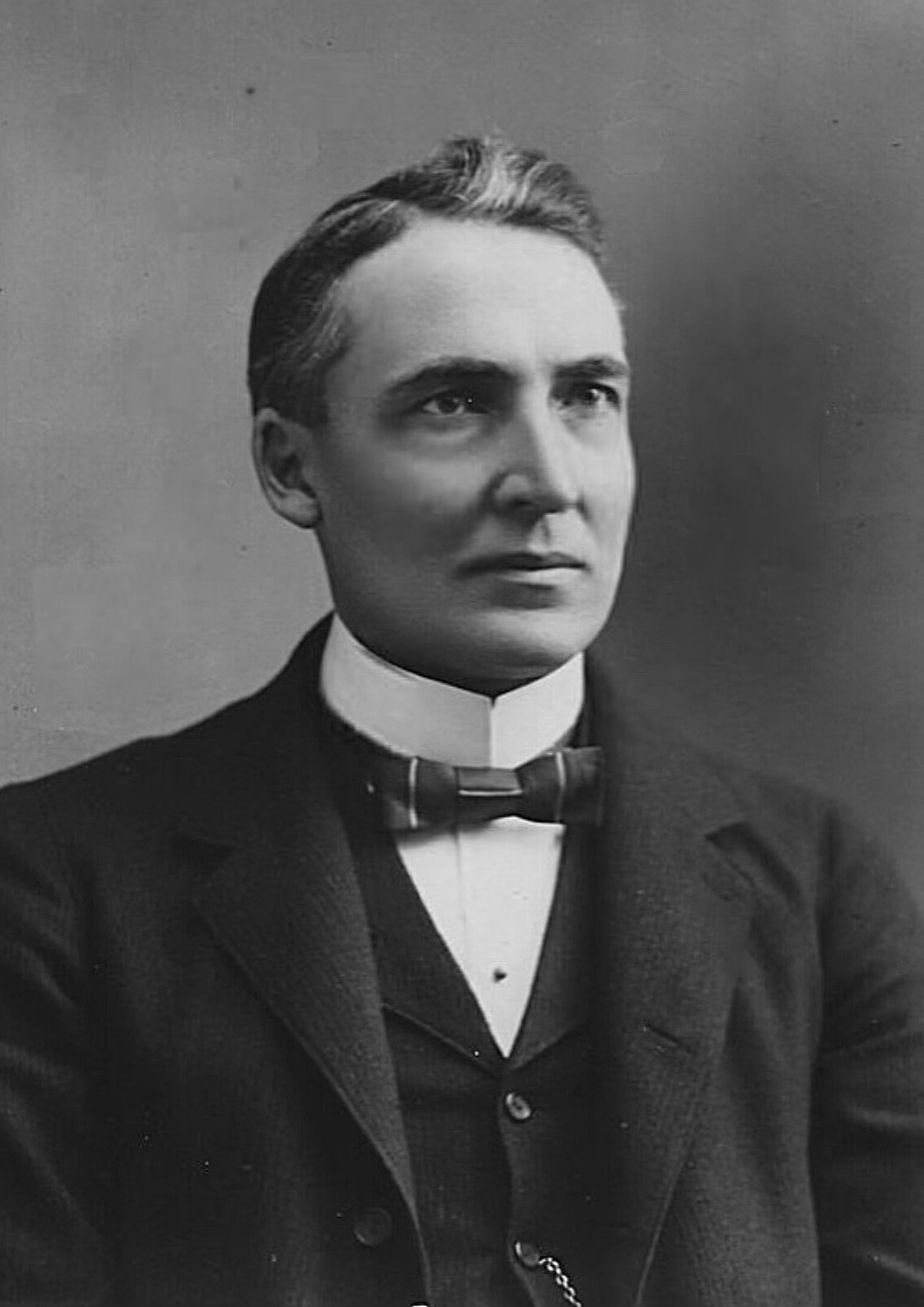

Nominee	Judson Harmon	Warren G. Harding	Tom Clifford
Party	Democratic	Republican	Socialist
Popular vote	477,077	376,700	60,637
Percentage	51.61%	40.75%	6.56%
- County results Harmon: 40–50% 50–60% 60–70% 70–80% Harding: 40–50% 50–60%
Governor before election
Judson Harmon
Democratic
Elected Governor
Judson Harmon
Democratic

The 1910 Ohio gubernatorial election was held on November 8, 1910. Incumbent Democrat Judson Harmon defeated Republican nominee Warren G. Harding with 51.61% of the vote.

Harding would be elected to the Senate in 1914, and then to the Presidency in 1920.

== General election ==
=== Candidates ===
Major party candidates

- Judson Harmon, Democratic
- Warren G. Harding, Republican

Other candidates

- Tom Clifford, Socialist
- Henry A. Thompson, Prohibition
- J.R. Malley, Socialist Labor

=== Results ===
1910 Ohio gubernatorial election
Party	Candidate	Votes	%	±%
Democratic	Judson Harmon (incumbent)	477,077	51.61%	
Republican	Warren G. Harding	376,700	40.75%	
Socialist	Tom Clifford	60,637	6.56%	
Prohibition	Henry A. Thompson	7,129	0.77%	
Socialist Labor	J.R. Malley	2,920	0.32%	
Majority		100,377		
Turnout				
Democratic hold		Swing		
