= Arthur Lovett Garford =

American inventor and politician (1858–1933)

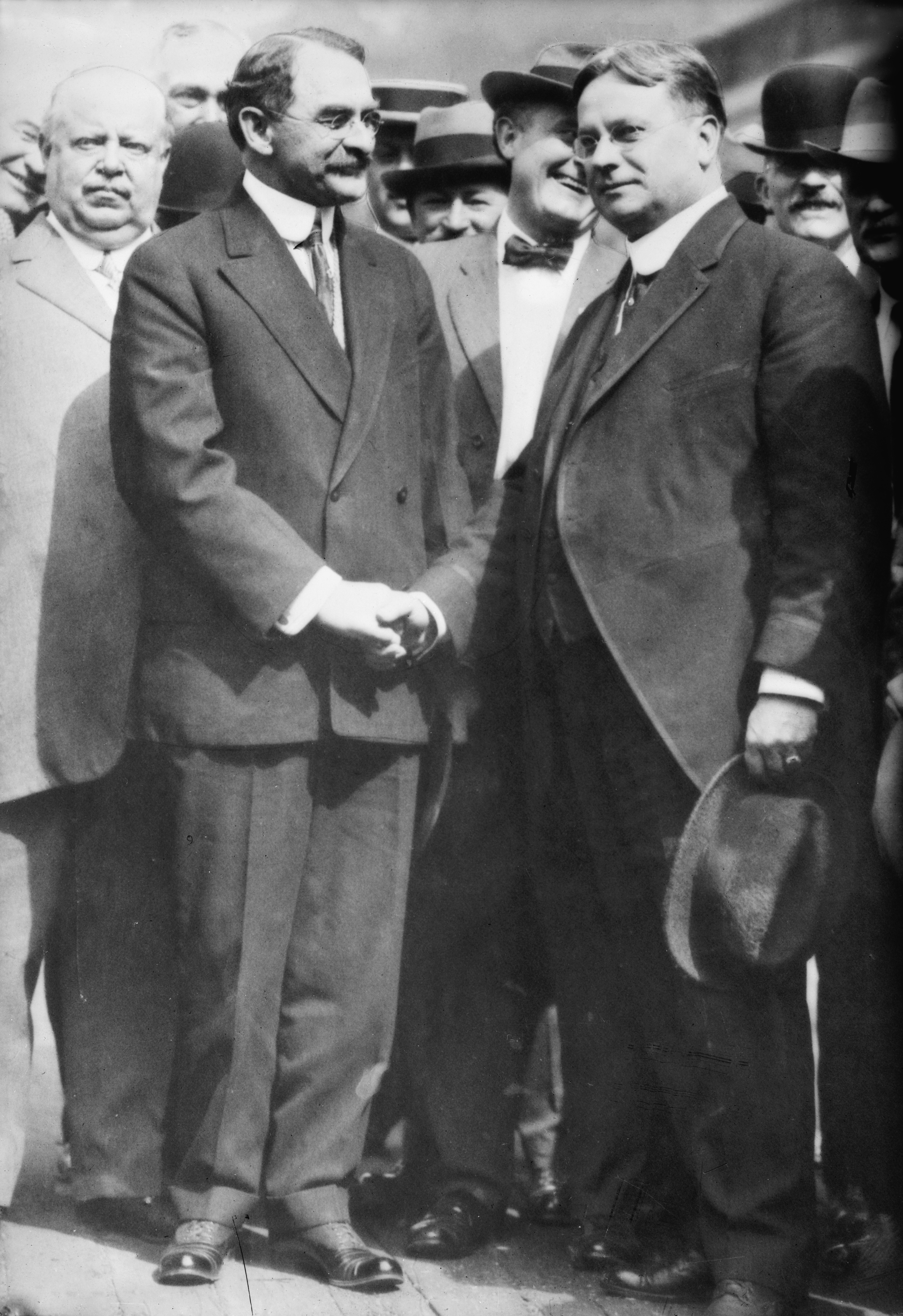
Arthur Lovett Garford (left) and Hiram Johnson (right) circa 1910-1913

Arthur Lovett Garford (August 4, 1858 – January 23, 1933) was an American industrialist, inventor, and politician. Today, Garford's home serves as the Hickories Museum and home of the Lorain County Historical Society.

== Biography ==
Garford was born on August 4, 1858, in Elyria, Ohio. As an 1875 graduate of Elyria High School, he began his career as a cashier and bookkeeper before he started the Garford Manufacturing Company in Elyria in 1892 and became the inventor of the first padded bicycle seat, known as the 'Garford Saddle'. Over 1 million saddles were sold in the first few years, which allowed Garford to form the American Saddle Company.

=== Automobile industry ===
After his success in the bicycle industry, Garford moved into automobiles and formed the Automobile and Cycle Parts Company in 1893. The company changed its name to Federal Manufacturing Company, and within a few years, Garford resigned his interest in it and went on to form the Garford Company. The Studebaker Company became interested in Garford's automobile parts company and together they formed a partnership. Garford engaged to become president or founder of several manufacturing firms including the American Lace Manufacturing Company, the Republican Printing Company, and the Cleveland Automatic Machine Company.

By the early 1900s, Garford had gained wealth and a reputation as a businessman. He helped found the first Chamber of Commerce in Elyria. In 1896 and again in 1908, Garford served as an Ohio delegate to the Republican National Convention. He ran and lost a bid for Ohio Governor in 1912 and the U.S. Senate in 1914 under the Progressive Party.

He died on January 23, 1933.

== See also ==
Media related to Arthur Lovett Garford at Wikimedia Commons

- Studebaker-Garford
- Garford Motor Truck Co.

Party political offices
First	Progressive (Bull Moose) nominee for Governor of Ohio; 1912	Succeeded by James Rudolph Garfield
First after direct election of Senators was adopted in 1913	Progressive (Bull Moose) nominee for U.S. Senator from Ohio (Class 3); 1914	Party dissolved
