= Timothy Sylvester Hogan (judge) =

United States federal judge

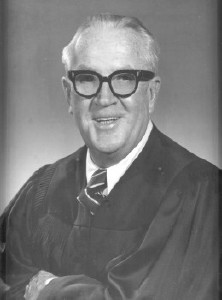

Senior Judge of the United States District Court for the Southern District of Ohio
- In office September 24, 1979 – January 30, 1989

Chief Judge of the United States District Court for the Southern District of Ohio
- In office 1975–1977
- Preceded by: Joseph Peter Kinneary
- Succeeded by: David Stewart Porter

Judge of the United States District Court for the Southern District of Ohio
- In office November 3, 1966 – September 24, 1979
- Appointed by: Lyndon B. Johnson
- Preceded by: John Weld Peck II
- Succeeded by: Walter Herbert Rice

Personal details
- Born: Timothy Sylvester Hogan; September 23, 1909 Wellston, Ohio, US
- Died: January 30, 1989 (aged 79)
- Resting place: Gate of Heaven Cemetery; Montgomery, Ohio, US
- Party: Democratic
- Parent: Timothy Sylvester Hogan (father)
- Education: Xavier University (A.B.); University of Cincinnati College of Law (J.D.)

Timothy Sylvester Hogan (September 23, 1909 – January 30, 1989) was a United States district judge of the United States District Court for the Southern District of Ohio.

== Education and career ==
Born in Wellston, Ohio, Hogan received an Artium Baccalaureus degree from Xavier University in 1930 and a Juris Doctor from the University of Cincinnati College of Law in 1931. He was in private practice in Cincinnati, Ohio from 1931 to 1941. He served as special counsel to the State Attorney General's Office of Ohio from 1937 to 1941. Hogan joined the United States Army Air Corps during World War II, serving from 1942 to 1946 and rising to the rank of lieutenant colonel. Upon discharge, he sought the office of Ohio Attorney General but lost. He returned to his private law practice and again served as special counsel to the State Attorney General from 1948 to 1950. He also began a long career as a lecturer at the University of Cincinnati Law School from 1950 to 1962.

== Federal judicial service ==
Hogan was nominated by President Lyndon B. Johnson on September 30, 1966, to a seat on the United States District Court for the Southern District of Ohio vacated by Judge John Weld Peck II. He was confirmed by the United States Senate on October 20, 1966, and received his commission on November 3, 1966. He served as Chief Judge from 1975 to 1977. He assumed senior status on September 24, 1979. Hogan served in that capacity until his death on January 30, 1989.

== Personal ==
Hogan was the son of Ohio Attorney General Timothy Sylvester Hogan.

== Sources ==
- History of the sixth district

Legal offices
Preceded by John Weld Peck II	Judge of the United States District Court for the Southern District of Ohio; 1966–1979	Succeeded by Walter Herbert Rice
Preceded by Joseph Peter Kinneary	Chief Judge of the United States District Court for the Southern District of Ohio; 1975–1977	Succeeded by David Stewart Porter
