= John Weld Peck II =

American judge (1913–1993)

Senior Judge of the United States Court of Appeals for the Sixth Circuit
- In office July 1, 1978 – September 7, 1993

Judge of the United States Court of Appeals for the Sixth Circuit
- In office July 22, 1966 – July 1, 1978
- Appointed by: Lyndon B. Johnson
- Preceded by: Seat established by 80 Stat. 75
- Succeeded by: Nathaniel R. Jones

Judge of the United States District Court for the Southern District of Ohio
- In office October 5, 1961 – August 4, 1966
- Appointed by: John F. Kennedy
- Preceded by: Seat established by 75 Stat. 80
- Succeeded by: Timothy Sylvester Hogan

Associate Justice of the Ohio Supreme Court
- In office April 16, 1959 – November 1960
- Appointed by: Michael DiSalle
- Preceded by: James Garfield Stewart
- Succeeded by: C. William O'Neill

Personal details
- Born: June 23, 1913 Cincinnati, Ohio, U.S.
- Died: September 7, 1993 (aged 80) Cincinnati, Ohio, U.S.
- Resting place: Oak Hill Cemetery
- Party: Democratic
- Education: Miami University (AB); University of Cincinnati College of Law (JD)

John Weld Peck II (June 23, 1913 – September 7, 1993) was a United States circuit judge of the United States Court of Appeals for the Sixth Circuit and previously was a United States district judge of the United States District Court for the Southern District of Ohio.

== Early life and education ==
Peck was born in Cincinnati, Ohio, the son of Arthur M. and Marguerite (Comstock) Peck. His grandfather Hiram D. Peck, was a judge of the old Superior Court of Cincinnati and a member of the Ohio Constitution Convention of 1912, which drafted the Ohio Constitution. Peck's uncle and namesake, John Weld Peck, was a Cincinnati city councilman and a United States district judge of the United States District Court for the Southern District of Ohio. Peck graduated from Wyoming High School in Wyoming, Ohio. He received his Artium Baccalaureus degree from Miami University in 1935 and his Juris Doctor from University of Cincinnati College of Law in 1938.

== Career ==
After graduating from law school in 1938, Peck was admitted to the bar in Ohio and entered private practice in Cincinnati with the firm of Peck, Shaffer and Williams from 1938 to 1942. Peck was married on March 25, 1942 to Barbara Moeser. One month later, he was drafted into the United States Army, serving four years on active duty in the European Theater. Toward the end of World War II, he was sent to France as a captain in the Judge Advocate General's Corps. After returning from the war in 1946, Peck returned to private practice at his law firm in Cincinnati. In 1949 Peck became executive secretary to the Ohio Governor Frank J. Lausche. In 1950, he was appointed a judge of the Hamilton County Court of Common Pleas; at the time, he was 36, the youngest judge to hold that office. Peck was a lecturer at the University of Cincinnati College of Law from 1948 to 1969. Peck served as Ohio Tax Commissioner in Columbus from 1951 to 1953 before returning to the Hamilton County Court of Common Pleas bench, on which he served from 1953 to 1954. Peck resumed private practice in Cincinnati from 1954 to 1959 before Governor Michael DiSalle appointed him a justice of the Supreme Court of Ohio in 1959. He served on the court until 1960, when he again resumed private practice in Cincinnati.

== Federal judicial service ==
Peck received a recess appointment from President John F. Kennedy on October 5, 1961, to the United States District Court for the Southern District of Ohio, to a new seat created by 75 Stat. 80. He was nominated to the same position on January 15, 1962. He was confirmed by the United States Senate on April 11, 1962, and received his commission on April 12, 1962. His service was terminated on August 4, 1966, due to elevation to the Sixth Circuit.

Peck was nominated by President Lyndon B. Johnson on June 13, 1966, to the United States Court of Appeals for the Sixth Circuit, to a new seat created by 80 Stat. 75. He was confirmed by the Senate on July 22, 1966, and received his commission the same day. He took the oath of office on August 4, 1966. He assumed senior status on July 1, 1978. His service was terminated on September 7, 1993, due to his death.

== Honor ==
In 1984, the federal office building in Cincinnati was named for Peck. At that time, Peck was one of only two living Americans to have a federal building named after him.

== Death ==
Peck died at his desk in the federal building bearing his name. His second wife, Janet Peck, and his three sons by his first wife survived him. He was interred at Oak Hill Cemetery.

Legal offices
Preceded by Seat established by 75 Stat. 80	Judge of the United States District Court for the Southern District of Ohio; 1961–1966	Succeeded by Timothy Sylvester Hogan
Preceded by Seat established by 80 Stat. 75	Judge of the United States Court of Appeals for the Sixth Circuit; 1966–1978	Succeeded by Nathaniel R. Jones
