= S. Arthur Spiegel =

American judge (1920–2014)

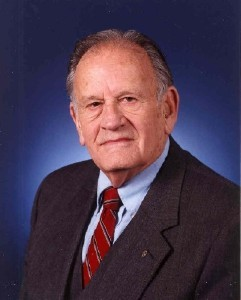

Senior Judge of the United States District Court for the Southern District of Ohio
- In office June 5, 1995 – December 31, 2014

Judge of the United States District Court for the Southern District of Ohio
- In office May 23, 1980 – June 5, 1995
- Appointed by: Jimmy Carter
- Preceded by: David Stewart Porter
- Succeeded by: Susan J. Dlott

Personal details
- Born: S. Arthur Spiegel; October 24, 1920 Cincinnati, Ohio, U.S.
- Died: December 31, 2014 (aged 94) Cincinnati, Ohio, U.S.
- Education: University of Cincinnati (BA); Harvard Law School (LLB)

S. Arthur Spiegel (October 24, 1920 – December 31, 2014) was a United States district judge of the United States District Court for the Southern District of Ohio.

== Education and career ==
Born in Cincinnati, Ohio, Spiegel received a Bachelor of Arts degree from the University of Cincinnati in 1942. He enlisted in the United States Marine Corps, serving in the Pacific during World War II from 1942 to 1946 and achieving the rank of captain. He received a Bachelor of Laws from Harvard Law School in 1948 and was in private practice in Cincinnati from 1948 to 1980.

== Federal judicial service ==
On April 14, 1980, Spiegel was nominated by President Jimmy Carter to a seat on the United States District Court for the Southern District of Ohio vacated by Judge David Stewart Porter. Spiegel was confirmed by the United States Senate on May 21, 1980, and received his commission on May 23, 1980. He assumed senior status on June 5, 1995.

In April 2005 a federal prison inmate named Tony Erpenbeck was indicted on federal charges that he had made attempts to have Spiegel and a prosecutor murdered. Spiegel had previously sentenced Erpenbeck to prison for obstruction of justice.

== Personal ==
Spiegel wrote a book titled A Trial On Its Merits, which was published in 2009, and he continued to hear cases until shortly before his death. Spiegel died on December 31, 2014, in Cincinnati. He and his wife had four sons.

== Sources ==
Legal offices
| Preceded by David Stewart Porter | Judge of the United States District Court for the Southern District of Ohio; 1980–1995 | Succeeded by Susan J. Dlott |
