= 1914 United States Senate election in Ohio =

- November 3, 1914

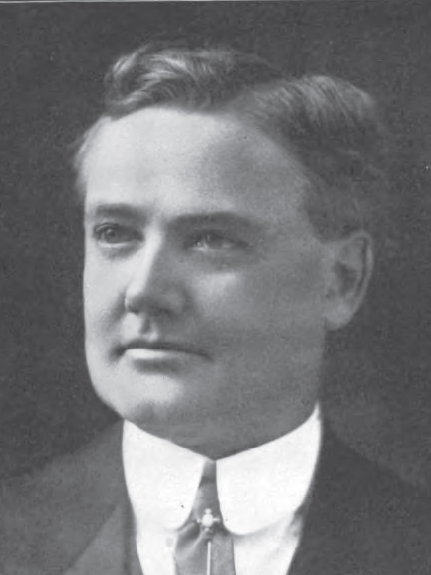

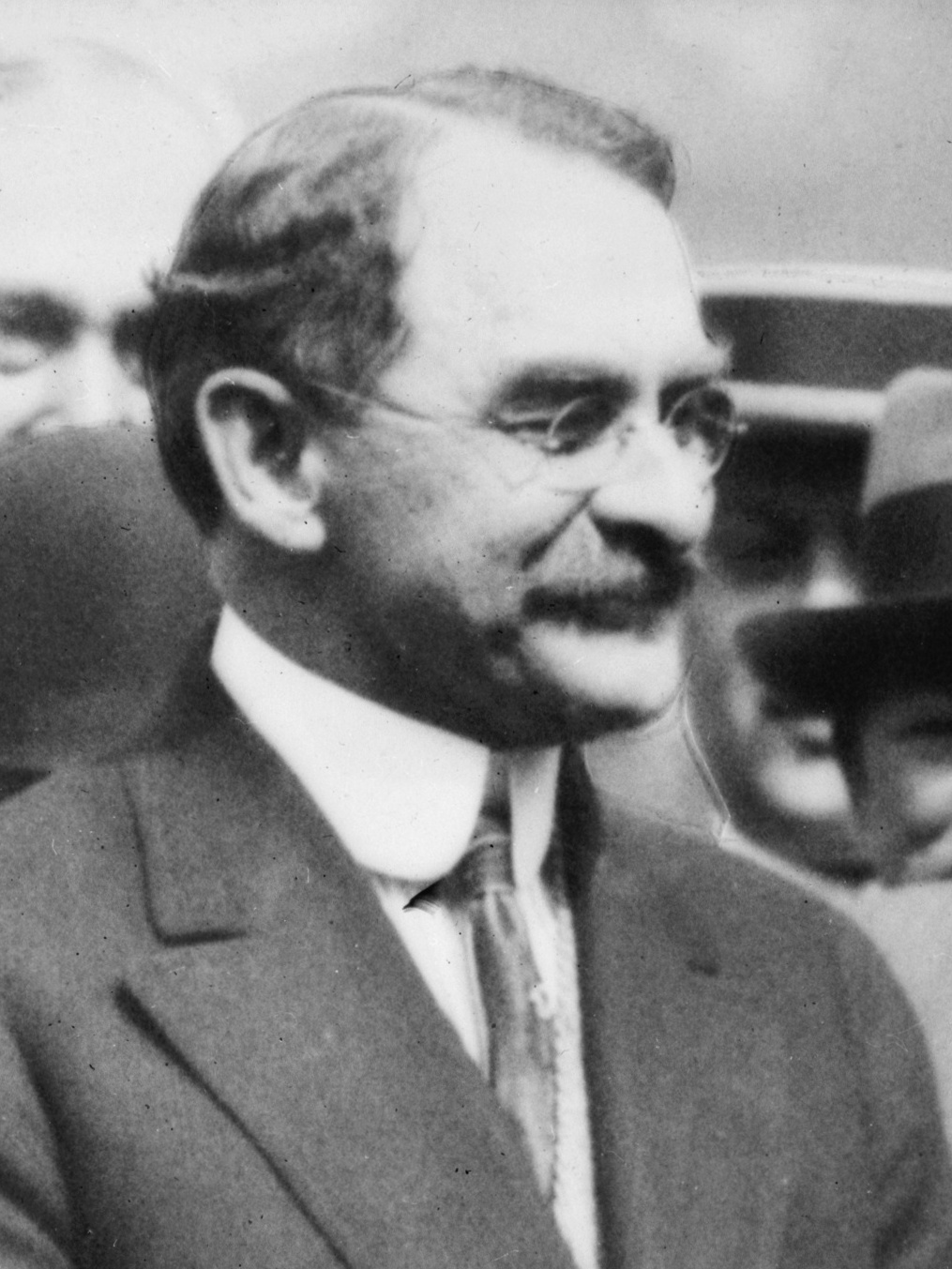
Nominee	Warren G. Harding	Timothy S. Hogan	Arthur L. Garford
Party	Republican	Democratic	Progressive
Popular vote	526,115	423,742	67,509
Percentage	49.16%	39.60%	6.31%
- County results Harding: 40–50% 50–60% 60–70% Hogan: 40–50% 50–60%
U.S. senator before election
Theodore E. Burton
Republican
Elected U.S. Senator
Warren G. Harding
Republican

The 1914 United States Senate election in Ohio was held on November 3, 1914. Republican nominee Warren G. Harding, future President of the United States, defeated Democratic nominee Timothy S. Hogan and Progressive Arthur L. Garford to succeed retiring incumbent Republican senator Theodore E. Burton.

== Republican primary ==
=== Candidates ===
- Ralph D. Cole, former U.S. Representative
- Warren G. Harding, former State Senator and Lieutenant Governor of Ohio
- Joseph B. Foraker, former governor of Ohio and U.S. Senator

==== Withdrew ====
- Theodore E. Burton, incumbent U.S. Senator since 1909

=== Campaign ===
Harding was initially not interested in a campaign for U.S. Senate, having been dissuaded by the divisive factionalism between the conservative and progressive wings of the Republican party which materialized during the 1912 elections. Harry Daugherty, an Ohio political boss, had entertained running for the seat himself, prompted by incumbent senator Theodore Burton's plans to retire upon the expiration of his term, but party leaders advised him not to run. Instead, Daugherty unsuccessfully attempted to stage a draft movement to convince Harding to run for the seat. In spite of the unsuccessful draft effort, Florence Harding herself convinced her husband to mount a campaign following the death of her father, Amos Kling. The personal circumstances underlying this development are not known, but some in Marion, the Hardings' home town, speculated that former state senator and lieutenant governor Harding had agreed not to seek higher office as part of a reuniting "truce" between Florence and her father, or that Kling had advised Harding that it would behoove Harding to further his business rather than run for further public office.

Although Daugherty claimed it was him who had convinced Harding to run for United States Senate, Harding's friend and attorney Hoke Donithen, who eventually became Harding's campaign manager, may have played a role in the decision. Retiring senator Theodore Burton also claimed credit, alleging to a biographer that Daugherty had not acquiesced in lending his support to Harding until after learning that the outgoing senator had backed him.

The Republican primary was a three-way contest, between Harding, Harding's former mentor and former U.S. Senator Joseph B. Foraker and Ralph Cole. Rather than campaigning directly against, and attempting to overtly differentiate himself from, Foraker and Cole, Harding notably employed a strategy of maintaining old, and forging new, alliances within the Republican party, to the chagrin of both of his opponents. At one point during the primary campaign, Cole asked, "If [Harding] is not going to fight someone, why did he enter the contest?" Harding eventually defeated both of his opponents in the primary, garnering 88,540 votes. Foraker finished in second with 76,817 votes, ahead of Cole with 52,237.

=== Results ===
Ohio United States Senate Republican Primary, 1914
Party	Candidate	Votes	%
Republican	Warren G. Harding	88,540	40.69%
Republican	Joseph B. Foraker	76,817	35.30%
Republican	Ralph D. Cole	52,237	24.01%
Majority		11,723	5.39%
Turnout		217,594	%

== General election ==
=== Candidates ===
- Arthur Lovett Garford, automotive engineer and nominee for Governor in 1912 (Progressive)
- Warren G. Harding, former State Senator and Lieutenant Governor of Ohio (Republican)
- E. K. Hitchens (Socialist)
- Timothy S. Hogan, Attorney General of Ohio (Democratic)

=== Campaign ===
In the general election campaign, Harding faced Democratic nominee Timothy Hogan, Progressive candidate Arthur Garford, and Socialist E.K. Hitchens. Hogan was the target of anti-Catholic sentiment amongst a large segment of voters; though Harding himself did not appear to outwardly embrace it during the course of the election, some of his supporters accused Hogan of wanting to "deliver Ohio to the Pope." Again favoring a conciliatory public stance, Harding also downplayed World War I as a campaign issue, which had begun in earnest months prior to the election, due to Ohio's significant German immigrant population.

Harding ultimately won the election and subsequently became the first United States Senator from Ohio to be popularly elected, following the ratification of the 17th Amendment to the Constitution. Harding's election to the United States Senate fueled speculation that he would again seek higher office, including the Presidency, though Harding himself did not publicly indicate any imminent interest in doing so; Harding had instead told family and friends, after being elected to the Senate, that he planned to return to his previous career in newspaper publishing at The Marion Daily Star after serving his term. Harding served in the Senate from 1921 until going on to be elected the 29th President of the United States in the 1920 election, and served as president until his death in office in August 1923.

=== Results ===
Ohio United States Senate election, 1914
Party	Candidate	Votes	%
Republican	Warren G. Harding	526,115	49.16%
Democratic	Timothy S. Hogan	423,742	39.60%
Progressive	Arthur L. Garford	67,509	6.31%
Socialist	E.K. Hitchens	52,803	4.93%
Majority		102,373	9.56%
Turnout		1,070,169	%
Republican hold			

== See also ==
- 1914 United States Senate elections
- List of United States senators from Ohio
