= Timothy Sylvester Hogan (politician) =

American lawyer

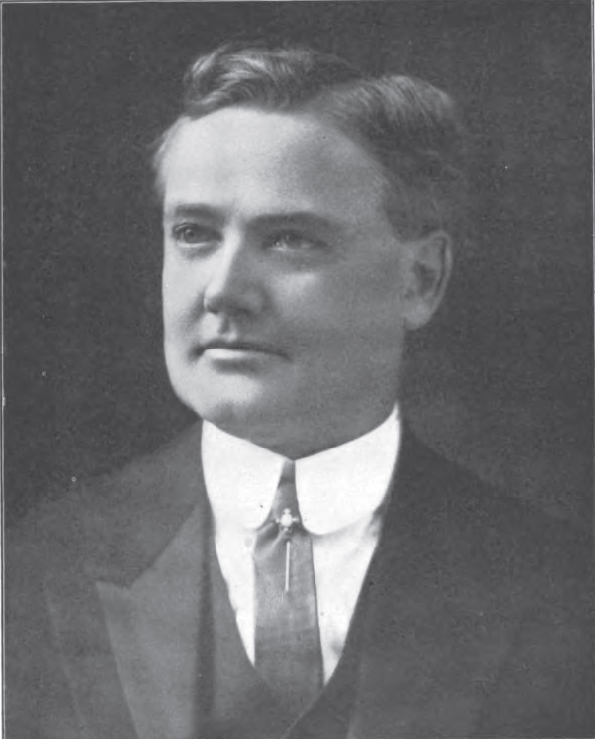
- Timothy Hogan, c. 1912

Ohio Attorney General
- In office 1911–1915
- Governor: Judson Harmon; James M. Cox
- Preceded by: Ulysses Denman
- Succeeded by: Edward Turner

Personal details
- Born: June 11, 1864 Jackson County, Ohio, U.S.
- Died: December 8, 1926 (aged 62) Columbus, Ohio, U.S.
- Party: Democratic
- Spouse(s): Mary Collins (1891–1905); Mary Deasy (1908–1925)
- Children: 6, including Timothy
- Education: Ohio University
- Occupation: Lawyer

Timothy Sylvester Hogan (June 11, 1864 – December 8, 1926) was an American Democratic politician in the U.S. state of Ohio who served as Ohio Attorney General from 1911–1915.

== Biography ==
Timothy S. Hogan was born on a farm in Jackson County, Ohio. Both his parents were born in County Kerry, Ireland, and immigrated to America in 1850. His father died in 1894 and his mother in 1897. Hogan attended the public schools of Jackson County, and the Ohio Normal University in Ada, Ohio. He graduated from Ohio University in Athens, Ohio in 1889, and taught school for fourteen years.

Hogan began home study of law after a fellow teacher presented him a copy of Blackstone. He was admitted to the bar in 1894, and began a practice at Wellston, Ohio. His first case was a man charged with murder. He gained an acquittal, and, at once, a lucrative practice. He lost one murder case in his career when he unsuccessfully defended John William Tracey in December 1910. Ironically this was his last case before becoming Ohio Attorney General.

In 1896, Hogan was a candidate for Ohio's 10th congressional district, but lost to Republican Lucien J. Fenton. In 1908, he was nominated for Ohio Attorney General, but failed in the general election. In 1910, and in 1912 by a larger plurality, he was elected Attorney General and re-elected. He lost election to the United States Senate in 1914; his Republican opponent was future president Warren G. Harding.

In 1891 Hogan married Mary Collins of Washington Court House, Ohio. They had two sons and two daughters. One child died prior to Mary Collins Hogan's death in 1905. Hogan married again in 1908, to Mary L. Deasy of Cincinnati, and they had two sons and a daughter. One of the two sons with Mary Deasy was Federal judge Timothy Sylvester Hogan, who was born in Wellston in 1909 and died in 1989.

Hogan died of pernicious anemia in 1926.

Party political offices
First	Democratic nominee for U.S. Senator from Ohio (Class 3); 1914	Succeeded by William Alexander Julian
Legal offices
Preceded by Ulysses G. Denman	Ohio Attorney General; 1911 – 1915	Succeeded by Edward C. Turner
