= Frederick Samuel Fish =

American politician (1852-1936)

Frederick S. Fish

Member of the New Jersey Senate from Essex County
- In office 1885–1888
- Preceded by: William Stainsby
- Succeeded by: Augustus F. R. Martin

Personal details
- Born: February 1852 Newark, New Jersey
- Died: August 11, 1936 (aged 84)
- Party: Republican

Frederick Samuel Fish (8 February 1852 – 13 August 1936), born in Newark, was an American lawyer, politician and automotive manufacturing executive. Originally a successful corporation lawyer, he entered the Studebaker corporation through marriage and became the corporation's president in 1909 and chairman of the board from 1915 to 1935. He is credited with introducing the manufacture of Studebaker cars, first electric, then gasoline-powered.

== Early life ==
His parents were the Rev. Henry Clay and Clarissa (Jones) Fish. He attended Newark Academy and entered the University of Rochester, graduating with a B.A. degree in 1873. He then studied law, was admitted to the New Jersey Bar in 1876, and practised in Newark and in New York City from 1876 to 1890.

== Political career ==
He was city attorney of Newark (1880–1884), a member of the New Jersey General Assembly (1884–85) and a member of the New Jersey Senate from Essex County (1885–1887), serving as president of that body during his last term.

== Career with Studebaker Corporation ==
In 1891, Fred Fish married Grace, the daughter of John Studebaker and entered the Studebakers' wagon-making firm as a director and general counsel. In 1897, he became chairman of the executive committee. However, he was more than a lawyer—he was an aviation enthusiast, even before the Wright brothers flew at Kitty Hawk. In 1895, he was talking about his ideas for a practical horseless carriage and, in 1897, the firm had an engineer working on a motor vehicle. He can therefore be identified as the first person to initiate production of motor vehicles at the world's largest maker of wagons and carriages at the end of the nineteenth century. In 1919, his son Frederick Studebaker Fish was listed as a Studebaker director in the company history written by president Albert Russel Erskine.

Political offices
Preceded by John W. Griggs	President of the New Jersey Senate; 1887	Succeeded by George H. Large
